= 2020 Cook County, Illinois, elections =

- November 3, 2020
- Turnout: 72.20%

The Cook County, Illinois, general election was held on November 3, 2020. Elections were held for Clerk of the Circuit Court, State's Attorney, Cook County Board of Review district 1, three seats on the Water Reclamation District Board, and judgeships on the Circuit Court of Cook County.

Primary elections, held using the open primary system, took place on March 17, 2020.

== Election information ==
The primaries and general elections for Cook County races coincided with those for federal races (President, House, and Senate) and those for state elections.

=== Voter turnout ===
==== Primary election ====
For the primaries, turnout was 33.54%, with 1,037,951 ballots cast. The ballots cast comprised 957,791 Democratic, 79,669 Republican, and 491 nonpartisan primary ballots. Turnout in the city of Chicago was 37.78%, while turnout in suburban Cook County was 29.42%.

Turnout in the primaries was considered to be low for a presidential primary. The low turnout was attributed by many to the ongoing COVID-19 pandemic. The potentially suppressed turnout of election-day voting as a result of virus concerns was partially offset by high in-person early voting and mail-in ballot numbers. 339,000 people cast early votes, a record number, with Chicago seeing 172,000, and the rest of Cook County seeing 167,000 early votes, a record for each jurisdiction. The election also saw a record number of requests made for mail-in ballots, with both Chicago and the rest of Cook County seeing numbers of requests surpassing any previous election. In Chicago there were 118,000 such requests, with over 80,000 mail-in ballots ultimately being returned and counted. In suburban Cook County, 47,652 mail-in ballots were returned, setting a record. In Chicago, 45% of votes cast were either early votes or votes by mail. In suburban Cook County, 56% of votes cast were either early votes or votes by mail.

The county's turnout was higher than the statewide turnout rate of 28.36%.

==== General election ====
For the general election, turnout was 72.20%, with 2,349,010 ballots cast. Turnout in the city of Chicago was 73.28%, while turnout in suburban Cook County was 71.18%.

The county, as a whole, saw a turnout that was slightly below the statewide turnout rate of 72.92%.

== Clerk of the Circuit Court ==
2020 Clerk of the Circuit Court of Cook County election
- November 3, 2020
- Turnout: 65.22%
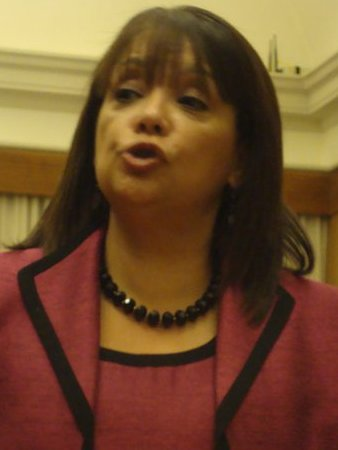

Candidate	Iris Martinez	Barbara Ruth Bellar
Party	Democratic	Republican
Popular vote	1,549,615	572,169
Percentage	73.03%	26.97%
Clerk before election
Dorothy A. Brown
Democratic
Elected Clerk
Iris Martinez
Democratic

The incumbent fifth-term clerk of the Circuit Court of Cook County, Dorothy Brown, announced in 2019 that she would not run for re-election. Brown had been the subject of a federal corruption investigation when she made the announcement. Democrat Iris Martinez was elected to succeed her.

The last Republican to hold this office was Brown's immediate predecessor Aurelia Pucinski, who, while elected a Democrat in each of her elections to the office, had switched parties in her final term.

=== Primaries ===
==== Democratic ====
Candidates

The following candidates ran for the Democratic Party nomination for Clerk of the Circuit Court:

Candidate	Experience	Campaign	Ref
Michael Cabonargi	Member of Cook County Board of Review for the 2nd district	Website	
Richard Boykin	Former member of Cook County Board of Commissioners for the 1st district	Website	
Iris Martinez	Illinois State Senator for the 20th district	Website	
Jacob Meister	Civil rights lawyer Candidate for Clerk of the Cook County Circuit Court in 2016; Candidate for U.S. Senate in 2010	Website	

Withdrew

- Theresa Siaw, candidate for 29th ward alderman in 2019
- Mariyana Spyropoulos, member of the Metropolitan Water Reclamation District of Greater Chicago Board of Commissioners
- Todd Stroger, former president of the Cook County Board of Commissioners –withdrew amid challenge to his ballot petitions

Results

Clerk of the Circuit Court of Cook County Democratic primary
Party	Candidate	Votes	%
Democratic	Iris Y. Martinez	269,578	33.67
Democratic	Michael M. Cabonargi	216,180	27.00
Democratic	Richard R. Boykin	199,526	24.92
Democratic	Jacob Meister	113,855	14.22
Write-in	Others	1,511	0.19
Total votes		800,650	100

==== Republican ====
Candidates

The following candidates ran for the Republican party nomination for Clerk of the Circuit Court:

Candidate	Experience	Campaign	Ref
Barbara Ruth Bellar	Candidate for Illinois State Senate in 2012; Candidate for Illinois House of Representatives in 2010		

Write-in candidates

- Richard Mayers, perennial candidate and alleged white supremacist, write-in candidate for Chicago Mayor, City Clerk, Treasurer, and alderman in 2019; congressional candidate in 2000, 2002, 2008, 2016, 2018, and 2020; 1998 State House candidate; 1993 Berwyn city clerk and city treasurer candidate; write-in candidate for U.S. Senator in 2020; write-in candidate in 2020 Illinois Republican presidential primary

Results

Clerk of the Circuit Court of Cook County Republican primary
Party	Candidate	Votes	%
Republican	Barbara Bellar	64,160	99.42
Write-in	Richard Mayers	1	0.00
Write-in	Others	374	0.58
Total votes		64,535	100

=== General election ===
Clerk of the Circuit Court of Cook County election
Party	Candidate	Votes	%	±%
Democratic	Iris Y. Martinez	1,549,615	73.03	+4.81
Republican	Barbara Bellar	572,169	26.97	−4.81
Total votes		2,121,784	100	

Martinez's 73.03% share of the vote was the most that any candidate had received for this office since the 2004. Bellar's 26.97% vote share was the worst performance by a major party (Democratic or Republican) nominee since that same election.

== State's Attorney ==
2020 Cook County State's Attorney election
- November 3, 2020
- Turnout: 67.72%
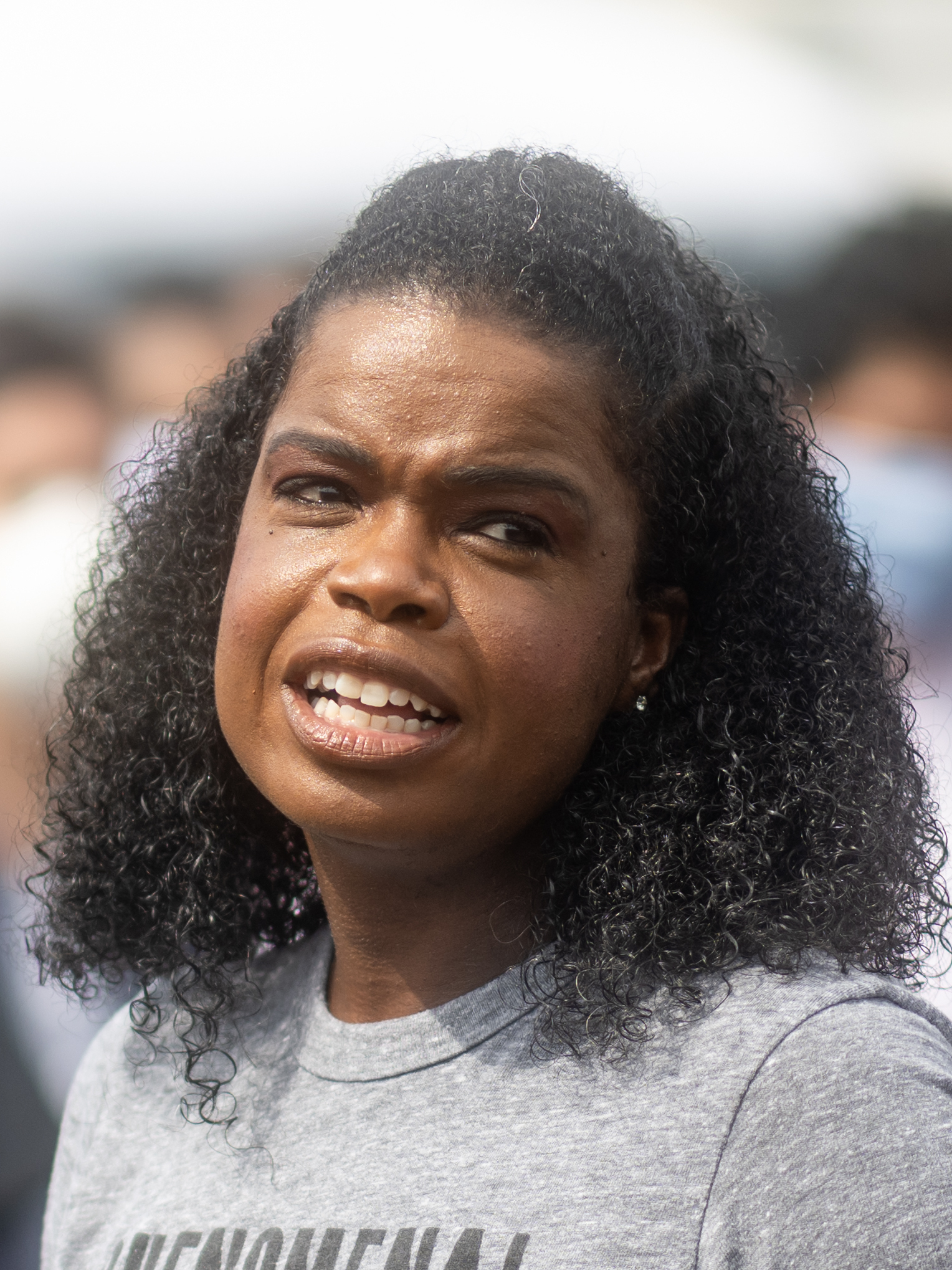

Candidate	Kim Foxx	Pat O'Brien	Brian Dennehy
Party	Democratic	Republican	Libertarian
Popular vote	1,194,299	861,108	147,769
Percentage	54.21%	39.08%	6.71%
- Results: Foxx: 40–50% 50–60% 60–70% 70–80% 80–90% >90% O'Brien: 40–50% 50–60% 60–70% 70–80% 80–90% >90%
State's Attorney before election
Kim Foxx
Democratic
Elected State's Attorney
Kim Foxx
Democratic

Incumbent Cook County state's attorney Kim Foxx won reelection to a second term.

Foxx defeated three opponents in the Democratic primary and Republican Pat O'Brien in the general election.

Only Democrats have held this office ever since Richard A. Devine unseated Republican Jack O'Malley in 1996.

=== Primaries ===
==== Democratic ====
Incumbent Kim Foxx faced three opponents in the, two former Assistant State's Attorneys, Bill Conway and Donna More, and former Chicago alderman Bob Fioretti.

The money spent in the Democratic primary made this the most expensive State's Attorney election in Cook County to date. Conway raised $11.9 million in campaign funds, most of which was from his father William E. Conway's cumulative donations of $10.5 million. Foxx raised $2.8 million, and her biggest donors include Fred Eychaner and the political action committee of SEIU Illinois. (Note: Foxx's campaign committee was created prior to her previous run for the office in the 2016 election. This amount counts all donations received by the committee after December 1, 2016, when Foxx first took office.) More raised $406,000 and Fioretti raised $20,000. (Note: Fioretti's campaign committee had been active for several of his prior runs for office. This amount counts all donations received by the committee since April 2019, after the end of the 2019 Chicago mayoral election where Fioretti last ran for office.)

Candidates

The following candidates ran for the Democratic Party nomination for State's Attorney:

Candidate	Experience	Campaign	Ref
Bill Conway	Former Navy Intelligence officer Former Cook County Assistant State's Attorney	Website	
Bob Fioretti	Former Chicago alderman for the 2nd ward Candidate for Mayor of Chicago in the 2015 and 2019 elections Candidate for Cook County Board President in 2018; Candidate for Illinois State Senate in 2016	Website	
Kim Foxx	Incumbent; Former Chief of Staff for Cook County Board President; Former Cook County Assistant State's Attorney	Website	
Donna More	Candidate for Cook County State's Attorney in 2016; Former U.S. Attorney and Cook County Assistant State's Attorney	Website	

Results

Cook County State's Attorney Republican primary
Party	Candidate	Votes	%
Republican	Patrick W. "Pat" O'Brien	51,610	72.53
Republican	Christopher E. K. Pfannkuche	19,122	26.87
Write-in	Richard Mayers	1	0.00
Write-in	Others	426	0.60
Total votes		71,159	100

=== General election ===
Results

Cook County State's Attorney election
Party	Candidate	Votes	%	±%
Democratic	Kim Foxx (incumbent)	1,194,299	54.21	−17.85
Republican	Patrick W. "Pat" O'Brien	861,108	39.08	+11.14
Libertarian	Brian Dennehy	147,769	6.71	N/A
Total votes		2,203,176	100	

Kim Fox's performance 54.21% vote share was the lowest performance by a Democratic nominee in a Cook County state's attorney election since 1996. It was also the worst that a re-nominated incumbent has performed in a general election for Cook County state's attorney since the same election, which saw Republican incumbent Jack O'Malley lose reelection. Conversely, O'Brien's 39.08% share of the vote was the best performance by a Republican since 1996 and Dennehy's 6.71% share of the vote was best performance by as third-party candidate since 1996.

== Cook County Board of Review ==
2020 Cook County Board of Review election
- November 3, 2020

1 of 3 seats on the Cook County Board of Review 2 seats needed for a majority
	First party	Second party
Party	Democratic	Republican
Seats before	2	1
Seats after	3	0
Seat change	▲1	▼1
Seats up	0	1
Races won	1	0

In the 2020 Cook County Board of Review election, one seat, Republican-held, out of its three seats, was up for election. Incumbent Dan Patlak was seeking reelection.

The Cook County Board of Review has its three seats rotate the length of terms. In a staggered fashion (in which no two seats have coinciding two-year terms), the seats rotate between two consecutive four-year terms and a two-year term.

=== 1st district ===
Incumbent second-term Cook County Board of Review Commissioner for the 1st district, Dan Patlak, a third-term Republican last reelected in 2016, was unseated by Democrat Tammy Wendt.

This election was to a two-year term.

==== Primaries ====
===== Democratic =====
Candidates

The following candidates ran for the Democratic Party nomination:

Candidate	Experience	Campaign	Ref
Abdelnasser Rashid	Former Deputy Chief of Staff for former Cook County Clerk David Orr; Former Chief Policy Officer for Cook County Assessor Fritz Kaegi; 2018 Democratic nominee for Cook County Board of Commissioners district 17	Website	
Tammy Wendt	Attorney and real estate agent Former Cook County assistant state's attorney Trial attorney for Jason Van Dyke in the Laquan McDonald case	Website	

Endorsements

Abdelnasser Rashid

Organizations

- Chicago Federation of Labor
- Cook County Democratic Party
- SEIU State Council

Individuals

- Alma Anaya, Cook County Board Commissioner
- Scott Britton, Cook County Board Commissioner
- Kelly Burke, Illinois State Representative for the 36th district and Assistant Majority Leader
- Jacqueline Collins, Illinois State Senator for the 16th district
- Bill Cunningham, Illinois State Senator for the 18th district and President Pro Tempore
- John Daley, Cook County Board Commissioner
- Will Davis, Illinois State Representative for the 30th district and Assistant Majority Leader
- Bridget Degnen, Cook County Board Commissioner
- Dick Durbin, U.S. Senator for Illinois
- Robyn Gabel, Illinois State Representative for the 18th district
- Jesús "Chuy" García, U.S. Representative for Illinois' 4th district
- Michael Hastings, Illinois State Senator for the 19th district
- Brandon Johnson, Cook County Board Commissioner
- Thaddeus Jones, Illinois State Representative for the 29th district
- Robin Kelly, U.S. Representative for Illinois' 2nd district
- Raja Krishnamoorthi, U.S. Representative for Illinois' 8th district
- Steve Landek, Illinois State Senator for the 12th district
- Kimberly Lightford, Illinois State Senator for the 4th district and Majority Leader
- Theresa Mah, Illinois State Representative for the 2nd district
- Donna Miller, Cook County Board Commissioner
- Marty Moylan, Illinois State Representative for the 55th district
- Michelle Mussman, Illinois State Representative for the 56th district
- David Orr, former Cook County Clerk
- Jan Schakowsky, U.S. Representative for Illinois' 9th district
- Ram Villivalam, Illinois State Senator for the 8th district
- Mark Walker, Illinois State Representative for the 53rd district
- Michael Zalewski, Illinois State Representative for the 23rd district
Tammy Wendt

Organizations

- Cook County Sheriff's Police FOP Lodge 4
- Fraternal Order of Police Chicago Lodge #7

Individuals

- Gary L'Heureux, Mayor of Midlothian
- Chief Michael McDonald, Palos Fire Protection District
- Lou Presta, Mayor of Crestwood
- Bob Straz, Mayor of Palos Heights

Results

Board of Review 1st district Democratic primary
Party	Candidate	Votes	%
Democratic	Tammy Wendt	110,559	54.45
Democratic	Abdelnasser Rashid	92,493	45.55
Total votes		203,052	

===== Republican =====
Candidates

The following candidates ran for the Republican party nomination:

Candidate	Experience	Campaign	Ref
Dan Patlak	Incumbent; Former Assessor of Wheeling Township	Website	

Results

Board of Review 1st district Republican primary
Party	Candidate	Votes	%
Republican	Dan Patlak (incumbent)	43,625	100
Total votes		43,625	100

==== General election ====
Endorsements

Dan Patlak (R)

Newspapers

- Chicago Sun-Times
- Chicago Tribune

Results

Board of Review 1st district election
Party	Candidate	Votes	%
Democratic	Tammy Wendt	394,202	50.75
Republican	Dan Patlak (incumbent)	382,509	49.25
Total votes		776,711	100

== Water Reclamation District Board ==
2020 Metropolitan Water Reclamation District of Greater Chicago election
- November 3, 2020

3 of 9 seats on the Metropolitan Water Reclamation District of Greater Chicago 5 seats needed for a majority
	First party	Second party
Party	Democratic	Green
Seats before	9	0
Seats after	9	0
Seat change	0	0
Popular vote	3,458,446	1,001,810
Percentage	77.54%	22.46%
Swing	▲0.78%	▲5.67%
Seats up	3	0
Races won	3	0

Three of the nine seats on the Metropolitan Water Reclamation District of Greater Chicago board were up for election in 2020. Each winning candidate was to serve a six-year term on the board. All candidates appeared together on the ballot, and voters could vote for up to three candidates (in both the primary and the general).

All three incumbents were Democrats. Incumbents Kimberly Neely du Buclet and Cam Davis won reelection, while Frank Avila lost renomination. Democrat Eira L. Corral also won election.

=== Primaries ===
==== Democratic ====
Candidates

The following candidates ran for the Democratic Party nomination:

- Frank Avila, incumbent Water Reclamation District Board commissioner
- Heather Boyle
- Mike Cashman
- Cam Davis, incumbent Water Reclamation District Board commissioner
- Deyon Dean
- Kimberly Neely du Buclet, incumbent Water Reclamation District Board commissioner, former member of the Illinois House of Representatives
- Patricia Theresa Flynn
- Michael Grace
- Shundar Lin
- Eira Corral Sepúlveda

The following candidates were removed from the ballot:

- Kisha McCaskill

Results

Water Reclamation District Board Democratic primary
Party	Candidate	Votes	%
Democratic	Kimberly Neely du Buclet (incumbent)	346,370	18.02
Democratic	M. Cameron "Cam" Davis (incumbent)	288,471	15.01
Democratic	Eira L. Corral Sepúlveda	242,055	12.59
Democratic	Patricia Theresa Flynn	222,191	11.56
Democratic	Heather Boyle	216,447	11.26
Democratic	Frank Avila (incumbent)	215,741	11.22
Democratic	Michael G. Grace	157,088	8.17
Democratic	Mike Cashman	99,319	5.17
Democratic	Shundar Lin	65,757	3.42
Democratic	Deyon Dean	61,102	3.18
Write-in	Others	7,627	0.40
Total votes		1,922,168	

==== Republican ====
No candidates were included on the ballot in the Republican primary. While two official write-in candidates did run, neither received a sufficient share of the vote to win nomination.

Write-in candidates

- Richard Mayers, perennial candidate and alleged white supremacist, write-in candidate for Chicago Mayor, City Clerk, Treasurer, and alderman in 2019; congressional candidate in 2000, 2002, 2008, 2016, 2018, and 2020; 1998 State House candidate; 1993 Berwyn city clerk and city treasurer candidate; write-in candidate for U.S. Senator in 2020; write-in candidate in 2020 Illinois Republican presidential primary
- Frank Rowder

Results

Water Reclamation District Board Republican primary
Party	Candidate	Votes	%
Write-in	Frank Rowder	7	0.21
Write-in	Richard Mayers	4	0.12
Write-in	Others	3,305	99.67
Total votes		3,316	100

==== Green ====
The Green Party nominated Troy Hernandez, Tammie Vinson, and Rachel Wales.

=== General election ===
Endorsements

Cam Davis (D)

Newspapers

- Chicago Sun-Times
- Chicago Tribune
Kimberly Neely Dubuclet (D)

Newspapers

- Chicago Sun-Times
- Chicago Tribune
Eira L. Corral Sepúlveda (D)

Newspapers

- Chicago Sun-Times
- Chicago Tribune

Results

Water Reclamation District Board election
Party	Candidate	Votes	%
Democratic	Kimberly Neely du Buclet (incumbent)	1,288,586	28.89
Democratic	M. Cameron "Cam" Davis (incumbent)	1,141,803	25.60
Democratic	Eira L. Corral Sepúlveda	1,028,057	23.05
Green	Tammie Felicia Vinson	324,905	7.28
Green	Troy Antonio Hernandez	339,633	7.61
Green	Rachel Wales	337,272	7.56
Total votes		4,460,256	100

== Judicial elections ==
Partisan elections were held to fill 13 judgeships in the Circuit Court of Cook County and 21 judgeships in subcircuits of the court. There were Democratic candidates for all 34 elections, whereas the Republican primary had been canceled for all but two vacancies. Retention elections were also held for judgeships on these courts.

== See also ==
- 2020 Illinois elections
- Illinois Fair Tax (statewide constitutional amendment on the 2020 ballot)

== Notes ==
Partisan clients
