= 2020 Clerk of the Cook County Circuit Court election =

2020 Clerk of the Circuit Court of Cook County election
- November 3, 2020
- Turnout: 65.22%
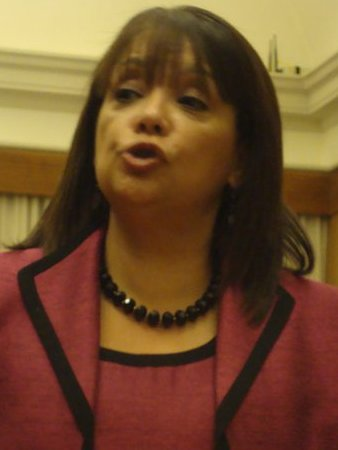

Candidate	Iris Martinez	Barbara Ruth Bellar
Party	Democratic	Republican
Popular vote	1,549,615	572,169
Percentage	73.03%	26.97%
Clerk before election
Dorothy A. Brown
Democratic
Elected Clerk
Iris Martinez
Democratic

In the 2020 Clerk of the Cook County Circuit Court election was held on November 3, 2020. Democratic nominee Iris Martinez was elected to succeed outgoing fifth-term clerk Dorothy A. Brown, a Democrat who did not seek re-election.

== Background ==
The incumbent fifth-term clerk of the Circuit Court of Cook County, Dorothy Brown, announced in 2019 that she would not run for re-election. Brown had been the subject of a federal corruption investigation when she made the announcement.

The last Republican to hold this office was Brown's immediate predecessor Aurelia Pucinski, who, while elected a Democrat in each of her elections to the office, had switched parties in her final term.

The election was a component of the 2020 Cook County, Illinois, elections. It coincided with the 2020 United States presidential election (including its primaries, which coincided with Illinois's Democratic, Republican presidential primaries), as well as the 2020 Illinois elections.

== Democratic primary ==
=== Candidates for Democratic primary ===
The following candidates ran for the Democratic Party nomination for Clerk of the Circuit Court:

Candidate	Experience	Campaign	Ref
Michael Cabonargi	Member of Cook County Board of Review for the 2nd district	Website	
Richard Boykin	Former member of Cook County Board of Commissioners for the 1st district	Website	
Iris Martinez	Illinois State Senator for the 20th district	Website	
Jacob Meister	Civil rights lawyer Candidate for Clerk of the Cook County Circuit Court in 2016; Candidate for U.S. Senate in 2010	Website	

Withdrew

- Theresa Siaw, candidate for 29th ward alderman in 2019
- Mariyana Spyropoulos, member of the Metropolitan Water Reclamation District of Greater Chicago Board of Commissioners
- Todd Stroger, former president of the Cook County Board of Commissioners –withdrew amid challenge to his ballot petitions

=== Endorsements in Democratic primary ===
Richard Boykin

Newspapers

- Chicago Tribune

Organizations

- Fraternal Order of Police Chicago Lodge #7

Elected officials

- Dorothy A. Brown, incumbent Clerk of the Cook County Circuit Court
- Danny K. Davis, U.S. Representative for Illinois' 7th district

Individuals

- Christopher G. Kennedy, Democratic candidate for Governor of Illinois in 2018
Michael Cabonargi

Newspapers

- Chicago Sun-Times

Organizations

- Chicago Federation of Labor
- Cook County Democratic Party

Elected officials

- Dick Durbin, United States Senator
- Toni Preckwinkle, Cook County Board President
- Jan Schakowsky, U.S. Representative for Illinois' 9th district
- Jesse White, Illinois Secretary of State
Jacob Meister

Newspapers

- Daily Herald

Organizations

- Chicago NOW PAC
- LGBTQ Victory Fund
- Northside Democracy for America
- Southside Democracy for America

Elected officials

- James Cappleman, alderman for Chicago's 46th ward
- Maria Hadden, alderman for Chicago's 49th ward
- Theresa Mah, Illinois State Representative for the 2nd district
- David Orr, former Cook County Clerk
- Andre Thapedi, Illinois State Representative for the 32nd district
- Scott Waguespack, alderman for Chicago's 32nd ward

=== Polls for Democratic primary ===
Poll source	Date(s) administered	Sample size	Margin of error	Richard Boykin	Michael Cabonargi	Iris Y. Martinez	Jacob Meister	Undecided
ALG Research	February 9–12, 2020	500	± 4.4	12%	4%	15%	3%	65%
Fako Research & Strategies (Boykin)	Late-January, 2020			13%	4%	11%	3%	69%

=== Campaign of Democratic primary ===
All four candidates in the Democratic Party primary for the office pledged to modernize the office and to address corruption.

=== Results of Democratic primary ===
Clerk of the Circuit Court of Cook County Democratic primary
Party	Candidate	Votes	%
Democratic	Iris Y. Martinez	269,578	33.67
Democratic	Michael M. Cabonargi	216,180	27.00
Democratic	Richard R. Boykin	199,526	24.92
Democratic	Jacob Meister	113,855	14.22
Write-in	Others	1,511	0.19
Total votes		800,650	100

== Republican primary ==
=== Candidates for Republican primary ===
The following candidates ran for the Republican party nomination for Clerk of the Circuit Court:

Candidate	Experience	Campaign	Ref
Barbara Ruth Bellar	Candidate for Illinois State Senate in 2012; Candidate for Illinois House of Representatives in 2010		

Write-in candidates

- Richard Mayers, perennial candidate and alleged white supremacist, write-in candidate for Chicago Mayor, City Clerk, Treasurer, and alderman in 2019; congressional candidate in 2000, 2002, 2008, 2016, 2018, and 2020; 1998 State House candidate; 1993 Berwyn city clerk and city treasurer candidate; write-in candidate for U.S. Senator in 2020; write-in candidate in 2020 Illinois Republican presidential primary

=== Results of Republican primary ===
Clerk of the Circuit Court of Cook County Republican primary
Party	Candidate	Votes	%
Republican	Barbara Bellar	64,160	99.42
Write-in	Richard Mayers	1	0.00
Write-in	Others	374	0.58
Total votes		64,535	100

== General election ==
=== Endorsements in general election ===
Iris Martinez (D)

Newspapers

- Chicago Sun-Times
- Chicago Tribune

=== Results of general election ===
Clerk of the Circuit Court of Cook County election
Party	Candidate	Votes	%	±%
Democratic	Iris Y. Martinez	1,549,615	73.03	+4.81
Republican	Barbara Bellar	572,169	26.97	−4.81
Total votes		2,121,784	100	

Martinez's 73.03% share of the vote was the most that any candidate had received for this office since the 2004. Bellar's 26.97% vote share was the worst performance by a major party (Democratic or Republican) nominee since that same election.
