= Kimberly du Buclet =

American politician

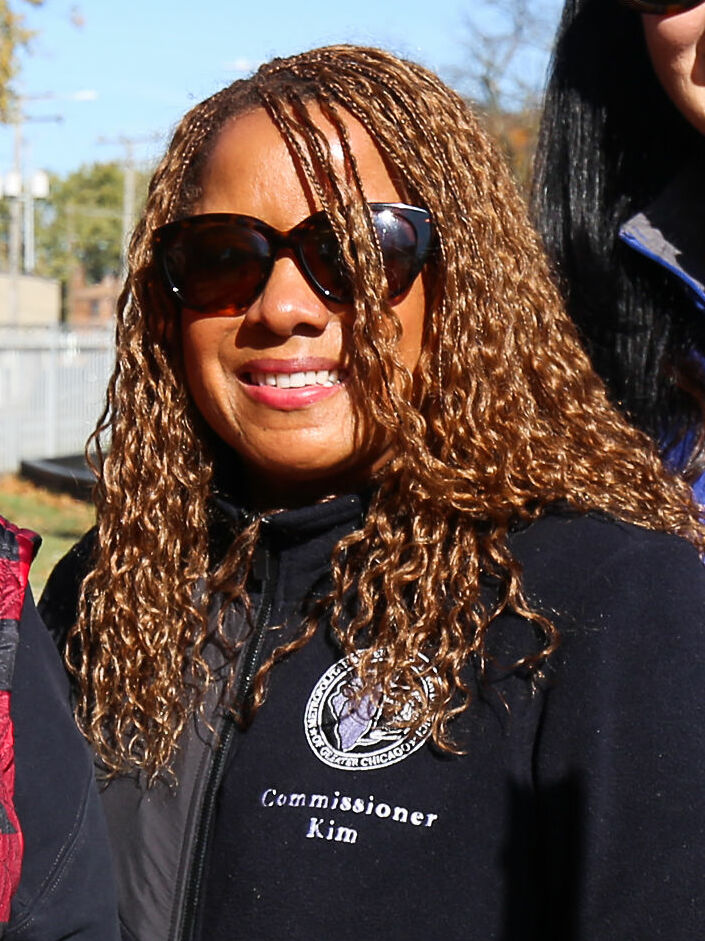
- du Buclet in 2022

Member of the Illinois House of Representatives from the 5th district
- Incumbent
- Assumed office May 13, 2023
- Preceded by: Lamont Robinson

Vice President of the Metropolitan Water Reclamation District of Greater Chicago Board of Commissioners
- In office January 5, 2023 – May 13, 2023
- Preceded by: Barbara McGowan
- Succeeded by: Patricia Flynn

Member of the Metropolitan Water Reclamation District of Greater Chicago Board of Commissioners
- In office December 2018 – May 13, 2023
- Preceded by: David Walsh
- Succeeded by: Precious Brady-Davis

Member of the Illinois House of Representatives from the 26th district
- In office March 2011 – January 2013
- Preceded by: William D. Burns
- Succeeded by: Christian Mitchell

Personal details
- Born: Chicago, Illinois, U.S.
- Party: Democratic
- Education: University of Illinois Urbana-Champaign (BA); University of Chicago (MBA)

Kimberly Neely du Buclet is a Democratic member of the Illinois House of Representatives, formerly serving on the board of commissioners for the Metropolitan Water Reclamation District of Greater Chicago (MWRD).

== Early life and education ==
du Buclet attended high school at University of Chicago Laboratory Schools. She also received a Bachelor of Science in marketing from the University of Illinois at Urbana–Champaign and a Master of Business Administration in marketing from the University of Chicago Booth School of Business.

== First tenure in the Illinois House of Representatives (2011–2013) ==
du Buclet represented the 26th District in the Illinois House of Representatives from 2011 to 2013. She was appointed to her seat in May 2011 after former incumbent William D. Burns stepped down to become Chicago's 4th Ward alderman. She did not run for a full term in the 2012 election.

du Buclet worked on sentencing reform passed in 2012 in the State Senate as Senate Bill 3349. The bill reduced the minimum time served before parole for certain felonies. During her term, du Buclet served on several legislative committees, including: Health Care Availability Access, Small Business Empowerment & Workforce, Higher Education, Appropriations-Human Services, Health & Healthcare Disparities, and Tourism & Conventions.

== MWRD Board of Commissioners (2018–2023) ==
In 2018, du Buclet won a special election to finish the remaining two years of an unexpired term on the Board of Commissioners of the Metropolitan Water Reclamation District of Greater Chicago. The seat had been vacated by Cynthia Santos, and had been held by interim appointee David Walsh prior to Neely's assumption of office. In 2020, du Buclet won the Democratic primary on March 17, 2020 for re-election to a full term on the board in an election to fill the three seats on the board with expiring terms. She was re-elected, winning the most votes of any candidate in the general election. On January 5, 2023, she was elected vice-president of the board of commissioners. Her tenure ended after she was appointed on May 13, 2023 to again serve in the Illinois House of Representatives.

In 2023, while serving on the board Du Buclet was appointed by the Environmental Protection Agency (EPA) to its 24-member Local Government Advisory Committee.

== Second tenure in the Illinois House of Representatives (2023–present) ==
On May 13, 2023, du Buclet was appointed the 5th district seat of the Illinois House of Representatives, vacated when Lamont Robinson became a Chicago alderman. Per Illinois law, her appointment was decided by Democratic committeepeople representing areas overlapping the district, since Robinson had been elected to the seat as a Democrat. The 5th district mainly represents portions of South Side neighborhoods (including Woodlawn, Washington Park, South Shore, and Englewood), and parts of The Loop, South Loop and River North.

In her appointed term, du Buclet introduced bills to hold corporations accountable for emissions, and a bill to create a state holiday memorializing Emmett Till.

du Buclet successfully sought re-election to a full term in 2024. In advance of the Democratic primary, she was endorsed by the Chicago Teachers Union and the Cook County College Teachers Union (both being local chapters of the American Federation of Teachers), as well as the endorsement of AFSCME Council 31. She won the primary, defeating her sole opponent 75.7% to 24.3%. She faced a Republican challenger in the general election, for which she was endorsed in the general election by the editorial board of the Chicago Tribune, Planned Parenthood Illinois Action, Equality Illinois and Giffords.

== Electoral history ==
Democratic primary for the 2018 MWRD Board of Commissioners special election for the seat vacated by Cynthia M. Santos
Party	Candidate	Votes	%
Democratic	Kimberly Neely du Buclet	561,695	96.48
Write-in	Others	20,473	3.52
Total votes		582,168	100

2018 MWRD Board of Commissioners special election for the seat vacated by Cynthia M. Santos
Party	Candidate	Votes	%
Democratic	Kimberly Neely du Buclet	1,173,498	77.07
Green	Rachel Wales	349,053	22.93
Total votes		1,522,551	100

2020 MWRD District Board of Commissioners Democratic primary
Party	Candidate	Votes	%
Democratic	Kimberly Neely du Buclet (incumbent)	346,370	18.02
Democratic	M. Cameron “Cam” Davis (incumbent)	288,471	15.01
Democratic	Eira L. Corral Sepúlveda	242,055	12.59
Democratic	Patricia Theresa Flynn	222,191	11.56
Democratic	Heather Boyle	216,447	11.26
Democratic	Frank Avila (incumbent)	215,741	11.22
Democratic	Michael G. Grace	157,088	8.17
Democratic	Mike Cashman	99,319	5.17
Democratic	Shundar Lin	65,757	3.42
Democratic	Deyon Dean	61,102	3.18
Write-in	Others	7,627	0.40
Total votes		1,922,168	

2020 MWRD Board of Commissioners election
Party	Candidate	Votes	%
Democratic	Kimberly Neely du Buclet (incumbent)	1,288,586	28.89
Democratic	M. Cameron “Cam” Davis (incumbent)	1,141,803	25.60
Democratic	Eira L. Corral Sepúlveda	1,028,057	23.05
Green	Tammie Felicia Vinson	324,905	7.28
Green	Troy Antonio Hernandez	339,633	7.61
Green	Rachel Wales	337,272	7.56
Total votes		4,460,256	100

2024 Illinois House of Representatives 5th district Democratic primary
Party	Candidate	Votes	%
Democratic	Kimberly Neely du Buclet (incumbent)	8,710	75.71
Democratic	Andre Smith	2,794	24.29
Total votes		11,504	100

2024 Illinois House of Representatives 5th district election
Party	Candidate	Votes	%
Democratic	Kimberly Neely du Buclet (incumbent)	32,549	88.73
Republican	Alan Rasho	5,133	13.99
Total votes		37,682	100
