= 2018 Cook County, Illinois, elections =

- November 6, 2018
- Turnout: 58.09%

The Cook County, Illinois, general election was held on November 6, 2018.

Primaries were held March 20, 2018.

Elections were held for Assessor, Clerk, Sheriff, Treasurer, President of the Cook County Board of Commissioners, all 17 seats of the Cook County Board of Commissioners, Cook County Board of Review districts 2 and 3, five seats on the Water Reclamation District Board, and judgeships on the Circuit Court of Cook County.

== Election information ==
2018 was a midterm election year in the United States. The primaries and general elections for Cook County races coincided with those for federal congressional races and those for state elections.

=== Voter turnout ===
Voter turnout in Cook County during the primaries was 30.84%, with 938,639 ballots cast. Among these, 795,427 Democratic, 137,286 Republican, 206 Green, and 5,720 nonpartisan primary ballots were cast. Turnout in the city of Chicago was 32.69%, and turnout in suburban Cook County was 29.05%.

The general election saw 58.09% turnout, with 1,795,518 ballots cast. Turnout in Chicago was 60.67%, and turnout in suburban Cook County was 55.65%. Turnout in Cook County exceeded the national average, which was 50.3%. Turnout was considered high in the United States during the 2018 midterm elections, with it being the highest national midterm turnout since 1914.

== Assessor ==
2018 Cook County Assessor election
- November 6, 2018
- Turnout: 54.04%
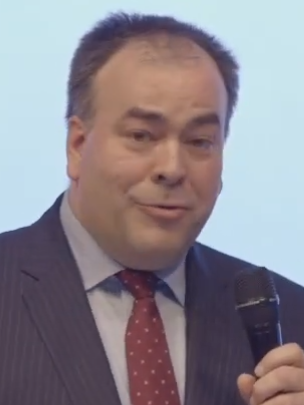

Nominee	Fritz Kaegi	Joseph Paglia
Party	Democratic	Republican
Popular vote	1,272,651	397,741
Percentage	76.19%	23.81%
Assessor before election
Joseph Berrios
Democratic
Elected Assessor
Fritz Kaegi
Democratic

In the 2018 Cook County Assessor election, incumbent second-term assessor Joseph Berrios, a Democrat, lost his bid for reelection, being unseated in the Democratic primary by Fritz Kaegi, who went on to win the general election.

=== Primaries ===
==== Democratic ====
Cook County Assesor Democratic primary
Party	Candidate	Votes	%
Democratic	Frederick "Fritz" Kaegi	327,769	45.53
Democratic	Joseph Berrios (incumbent)	243,425	33.81
Democratic	Andrea A. Raila	147,224	20.45
Write-in	Others	1,481	0.21
Total votes		719,899	100

==== Republican ====
No candidates, ballot-certified or formal write-in, ran in the Republican primary. However, the party ultimately nominated Joseph Paglia.

=== General election ===
Cook County Assessor election
Party	Candidate	Votes	%
Democratic	Frederick "Fritz" Kaegi	1,272,651	76.19
Republican	Joseph Paglia	397,741	23.81
Total votes		1,670,392	100

== Clerk ==
2018 Cook County Clerk election
- November 6, 2018
- Turnout: 46.22%
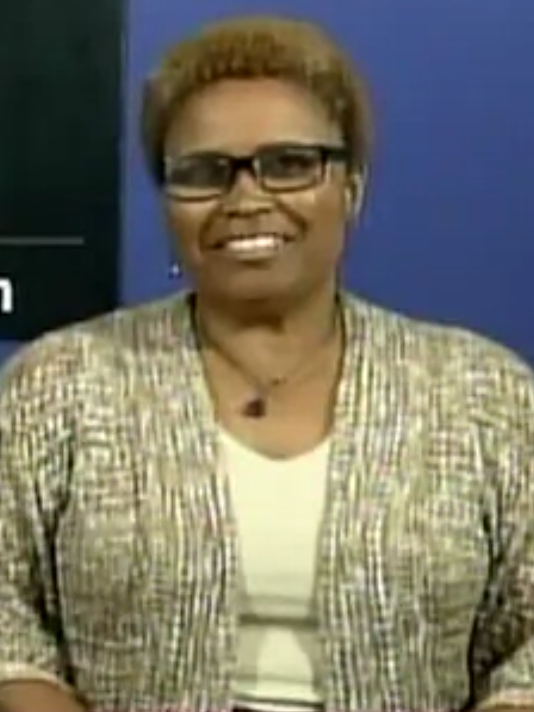
Candidate	Karen Yarbrough
Party	Democratic
Popular vote	1,415,244
Percentage	99.07%
Clerk before election
David Orr
Democratic
Elected Clerk
Karen Yarbrough
Democratic

In the 2018 Cook County Clerk election, incumbent seventh-term clerk David Orr, a Democrat, did not seek reelection. Democrat Karen Yarbrough won the election to replace him.

By winning the election, Yarbrough became the first woman to ever hold the office of Cook County Clerk.

=== Primaries ===
==== Democratic ====
Jan Kowalski McDonald was disqualified, and votes cast for her were not counted. However, due to ballot printing deadlines, her name was included on the ballot.

Cook County Clerk Democratic primary
Party	Candidate	Votes	%
Democratic	Karen A. Yarbrough	517,979	99.33
Write-in	Joy Jackson	290	0.06
Write-in	Others	3,215	0.62
Total votes		521,484	100

==== Republican ====
No candidates, ballot-certified or formal write-in, ran in the Republican primary.

=== General election ===
Cook County Clerk election
Party	Candidate	Votes	%
Democratic	Karen A. Yarbrough	1,415,244	99.07
Write-in	Eric J. Laster-Stewart	186	0.01
Write-in	Others	13,102	0.92
Total votes		1,428,532	100

== Sheriff ==
2018 Cook County Sheriff election
- November 6, 2018
- Turnout: 47.10%
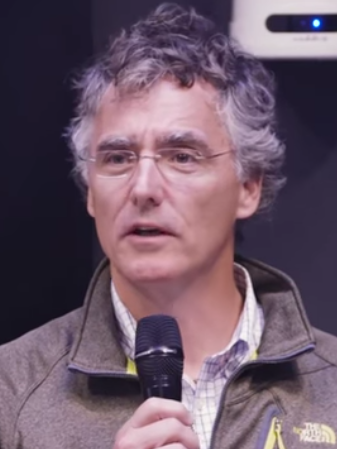
Candidate	Tom Dart
Party	Democratic
Popular vote	1,455,825
Percentage	100%
Sheriff before election
Tom Dart
Democratic
Elected Sheriff
Tom Dart
Democratic

In the 2018 Cook County Sheriff election, incumbent third-term Sheriff Tom Dart, a Democrat, was reelected.

=== Primaries ===
==== Democratic ====
Cook County Sheriff Democratic primary
Party	Candidate	Votes	%
Democratic	Thomas J. Dart (incumbent)	640,512	98.54
Write-in	Other	9,475	1.46
Total votes		649,987	100

==== Republican ====
No candidates, ballot-certified or formal write-in, ran in the Republican primary.

=== General election ===
Cook County Sheriff election
Party	Candidate	Votes	%
Democratic	Thomas J. Dart (incumbent)	1,455,825	100
Total votes		1,455,825	100

== Treasurer ==
2018 Cook County Treasurer election
- November 6, 2018
- Turnout: 47.17%
Candidate	Maria Pappas
Party	Democratic
Popular vote	1,447,145
Percentage	99.26%
Treasurer before election
Maria Pappas
Democratic
Elected Treasurer
Maria Pappas
Democratic

In the 2018 Cook County Treasurer election, incumbent fifth-term treasurer Maria Pappas, a Democrat, was reelected.

=== Primaries ===
==== Democratic ====
Cook County Treasurer Democratic primary
Party	Candidate	Votes	%
Democratic	Maria Pappas (incumbent)	579,453	82.29
Democratic	Peter Gariepy	124,742	17.71
Total votes		704,195	100

==== Republican ====
No candidates, ballot-certified or formal write-in, ran in the Republican primary.

=== General election ===
Cook County Treasurer election
Party	Candidate	Votes	%
Democratic	Maria Pappas (incumbent)	1,447,145	99.26
Write-in	Mary Arline Vann-Metcalf	142	0.01
Write-in	Others	10,638	0.73
Total votes		1,457,925	100

== President of the Cook County Board of Commissioners ==
2018 President of the Cook County Board of Commissioners election
- November 6, 2018
- Turnout: 45.63%
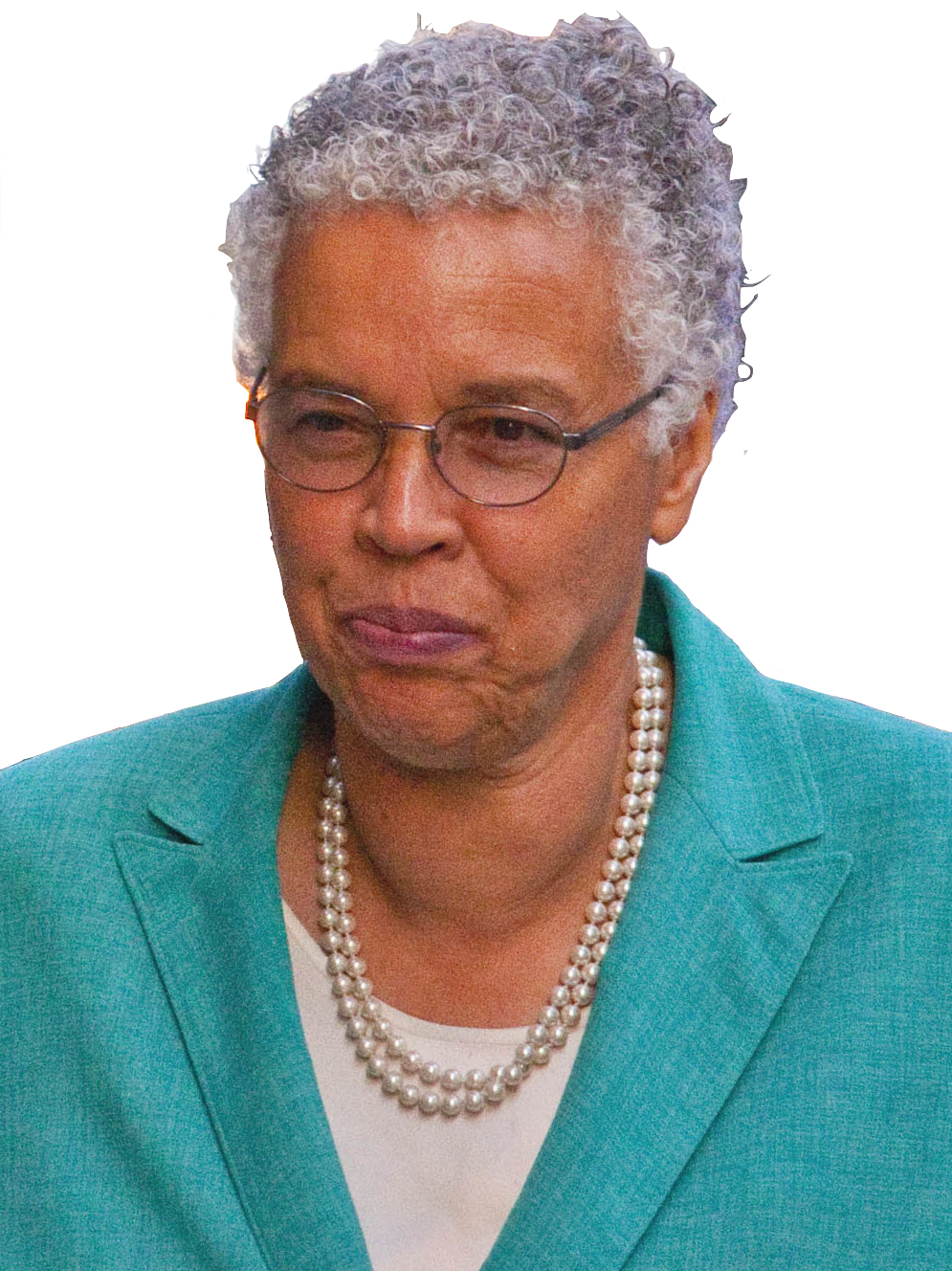
Nominee	Toni Preckwinkle
Party	Democratic
Popular vote	1,355,407
Percentage	96.11%
President before election
Toni Preckwinkle
Democratic
Elected President
Toni Preckwinkle
Democratic

In the 2018 President of the Cook County Board of Commissioners election, incumbent second-term president Toni Preckwinkle, a Democrat, was reelected.

=== Primaries ===
==== Democratic ====
President of the Cook County Board of Commissioners Democratic primary
Party	Candidate	Votes	%
Democratic	Toni Preckwinkle (incumbent)	444,943	60.82
Democratic	Bob Fioretti	286,675	39.18
Total votes		731,618	100

==== Republican ====
Only write-in candidates ran in the Republican primary. No certified write-in received enough votes to win the nomination.

President of the Cook County Board of Commissioners Republican primary
Party	Candidate	Votes	%
Write-in	Richard P. Munnich	101	1.14
Write-in	Others	8,801	98.87
Total votes		8,902	100

=== General election ===
President of the Cook County Board of Commissioners election
Party	Candidate	Votes	%
Democratic	Toni Preckwinkle (incumbent)	1,355,407	96.11
Write-in	Others	54,917	3.89
Total votes		1,410,324	100

== Cook County Board of Commissioners ==
2018 Cook County Board of Commissioners election
- November 6, 2018

All 17 seats on the Cook County Board of Commissioners 9 seats needed for a majority
	First party	Second party
Party	Democratic	Republican
Seats before	13	4
Seats won	15	2
Seat change	▲2	▼2
Popular vote	1,292,420	287,854
Percentage	81.79%	18.22%
Swing	▲4.67%	▼4.62%

The 2018 Cook County Board of Commissioners election saw all seventeen seats of the Cook County Board of Commissioners up for election to four-year terms.

Anticipating a potential wave election year for Democrats, President of the Cook County Board of Commissioners and Cook County Democratic Party Chairwoman Toni Preckwinkle made a focused effort to increase the Democrats' majority on the Cook County Board of Commissioners, focusing these efforts on three of the Board's four Republican-held seats. Preckwinkle-backed Democratic nominees ultimately succeeded in ousting Republican incumbents in the 14th and 15th districts, but fell roughly a mere 2,000 votes shy of unseating the 17th district's Republican incumbent. Preckwinkle did not target the Republican-held 9th district seat, as the incumbent Republican, Peter N. Silvestri, was both popular and a political centrist and had a reputation for being a peacemaker on the Board at times when conflict arose between its members.

Seven new members were elected, and ten incumbents were reelected. Three incumbents did not seek reelection. Four incumbents lost reelection, with two being defeated in primaries and the other two losing their general elections.

Two elections saw seats change party, in both instances seeing an incumbent Republican losing to a Democratic challenger, creating a net gain of two seats for Democrats and a net loss of two seats for Republicans. Nine races saw a Democrat unchallenged in the general election.

== Cook County Board of Review ==
2018 Cook County Board of Review election
- November 6, 2018

2 of 3 seats on the Cook County Board of Review 2 seats needed for a majority
	First party	Second party
Party	Democratic	Republican
Seats before	2	1
Seats after	2	1
Seat change	Steady	Steady
Seats up	2	0
Races won	2	0

In the 2018 Cook County Board of Review election, two seats, each Democratic-held, out of its three seats were up for election. Both incumbents won reelection, running unopposed in both their primary and general election races.

The Cook County Board of Review has its three seats rotate the length of terms. In a staggered fashion (in which no two seats have coinciding two-year terms), the seats rotate between two consecutive four-year terms and a two-year term.

=== 2nd district ===
Incumbent second-term member Michael Cabonargi, a Democrat last reelected in 2016, was reelected, running unopposed in both the Democratic primary and general election. This election was to a four-year term.

==== Primaries ====
===== Democratic =====
Cook County Board of Review 2nd district Democratic primary
Party	Candidate	Votes	%
Democratic	Michael Cabonargi (incumbent)	228,367	100
Total votes		228,367	100

===== Republican =====
No candidates, ballot-certified or formal write-in, ran in the Republican primary.

==== General election ====
Cook County Board of Review 2nd district election
Party	Candidate	Votes	%
Democratic	Michael Cabonargi (incumbent)	468,818	100
Total votes		468,818	100

=== 3rd district ===
Incumbent fourth-term member Larry Rogers, Jr., a Democrat last reelected in 2014, was reelected, running unopposed in both the Democratic primary and general election. This election was to a four-year term.

==== Primaries ====
===== Democratic =====
Cook County Board of Review 3rd district Democratic primary
Party	Candidate	Votes	%
Democratic	Larry Rogers, Jr. (incumbent)	228,367	100
Total votes		228,367	100

===== Republican =====
No candidates, ballot-certified or formal write-in, ran in the Republican primary.

==== General election ====
Cook County Board of Review 3rd district election
Party	Candidate	Votes	%
Democratic	Larry Rogers, Jr. (incumbent)	480,701	100
Total votes		480,701	100

== Water Reclamation District Board ==
2018 Metropolitan Water Reclamation District of Greater Chicago election
- November 6, 2018

5 of 9 seats on the Metropolitan Water Reclamation District of Greater Chicago 5 seats needed for a majority
	First party	Second party	Third party
Party	Democratic	Green	Republican
Seats before	7	0	1
Seats after	9	0	0
Seat change	▲2	Steady	▼1
Popular vote	5,290,709	1,158,045	595,929
Percentage	76.71%	16.79%	8.64%
Swing	▲4.78%	▼3.11%	▲0.46%
Seats up	3	0	0
Races won	5	0	0

In the 2018 Metropolitan Water Reclamation District of Greater Chicago election, five of the nine seats on the Metropolitan Water Reclamation District of Greater Chicago board were up for election. Three were regularly scheduled elections, and two were special elections due to a vacancies.

=== Regularly-scheduled election ===
Three six-year-term seats were up for a regularly scheduled election. Since three six-year seats were up for election, voters could vote for up to three candidates, and the top-three finishers would win.

Three of the incumbents for the three seats were seeking reelection: Kari Steele, Debra Shore, and Martin Durkan, all three Democrats. Steele and Shore won reelection to two of the seats, while Darkan lost renomination in the Democratic primary. Democrat Marcelino Garcia also won election was newly elected to the third seat.

==== Primaries ====
===== Democratic =====
Water Reclamation District Board election Democratic primary
Party	Candidate	Votes	%
Democratic	Marcelino Garcia	218,217	45.63
Democratic	Debra Shore (incumbent)	436,325	31.15
Democratic	Kari K. Steele (incumbent)	393,570	28.10
Democratic	Martin J. Durkan (incumbent)	259,701	18.54
Write-in	Others	24,602	1.76
Total votes		1,400,738	100

===== Republican =====
Water Reclamation District Board election Republican primary
Party	Candidate	Votes	%
Republican	R. Cary Capparelli	92,637	63.25
Republican	Shundar Lin	53,832	36.75
Total votes		146,469	100

===== Green =====
Water Reclamation District Board election Green primary
Party	Candidate	Votes	%
Green	Karen Roothaan	127	32.65
Green	Tammie Felicia Vinson	127	32.65
Green	Christopher Anthony	135	34.70
Total votes		146,469	100

==== General election ====
Water Reclamation District Board election
Party	Candidate	Votes	%
Democratic	Debra Shore (incumbent)	1,025,409	26.52
Democratic	Kari K. Steele (incumbent)	912,598	23.60
Democratic	Marcelino Garcia	841,193	21.75
Republican	R. Cary Capparelli	332,435	8.60
Republican	Shundar Lin	263,494	6.81
Green	Christopher Anthony	171,927	4.45
Green	Karen Roothaan	172,278	4.46
Green	Tammie Felicia Vinson	147,638	3.82
Total votes		3,866,972	100

=== Unexpired term, vacancy of Santos (2 years) ===
A special election was held to fill the seat vacated by Cynthia Santos following her 2016 appointment to the Illinois Pollution Control Board. The seat had been filled by interim appointee David Walsh (a Republican) up until the election.

==== Primaries ====
===== Democratic =====
Water Reclamation District Board unexpired term (vacancy of Santos) Democratic primary
Party	Candidate	Votes	%
Democratic	Kimberly Neely du Buclet	561,695	96.48
Write-in	Others	20,473	3.52
Total votes		582,168	100

===== Republican =====
No candidates, ballot-certified or formal write-in, ran in the Republican primary.

===== Green =====
Water Reclamation District Board unexpired term (vacancy of Santos) Green primary
Party	Candidate	Votes	%
Green	Rachel Wales	165	100
Total votes		165	100

==== General election ====
Water Reclamation District Board unexpired term (vacancy of Santos) election
Party	Candidate	Votes	%
Democratic	Kimberly Neely du Buclet	1,173,498	77.07
Green	Rachel Wales	349,053	22.93
Total votes		1,522,551	100

=== Unexpired term, vacancy of Bradford (2 years) ===
Three days before the candidate filing deadline, incumbent Water Reclamation District Board member Timothy Bradford's died, leaving his seat vacant. A special election was scheduled to fill his seat. No candidates filed in time to be included on the primary ballots, but Cam Davis won the Democratic Party nomination and Geoffrey Cubbage won the Green Party nomination, each as write-in candidates. Cam Davis won the general election.

==== Primaries ====
===== Democratic =====
Water Reclamation District Board unexpired term (vacancy of Bradford) Democratic primary
Party	Candidate	Votes	%
Write-in	M. Cameron “Cam” Davis	28,505	22.83
Write-in	Simon Gordon	1,681	1.35
Write-in	Frank Avila	515	0.41
Write-in	Karen Bond	316	0.25
Write-in	Sharon Waller	214	0.17
Write-in	Joe Cook	198	0.16
Write-in	Sergio Bocanegra	14	0.01
Write-in	Others	93,406	74.82
Total votes		124,849	100

===== Republican =====
No candidates, ballot-certified or formal write-in, ran in the Republican primary.

===== Green =====
Water Reclamation District Board unexpired term (vacancy of Bradford) Green primary
Party	Candidate	Votes	%
Write-in	Geoffrey Cubbage	76	88.37
Write-in	Others	10	11.63
Total votes		86	100

==== General election ====
Water Reclamation District Board unexpired term (vacancy of Bradford) election
Party	Candidate	Votes	%
Democratic	M. Cameron “Cam” Davis	1,189,922	78.96
Green	Geoffrey Cubbage	317,149	21.04
Total votes		1,507,071	100

== Judicial elections ==
10 judgeships on the Circuit Court of Cook County were up for partisan elections due to vacancies. In each of these races, Democratic nominees went unchallenged in the general election. Retention elections were also held for judgeships on the Circuit Court of Cook County. For the first time in three decades, a Circuit Court of Cook County judge (Matthew Coghlan) lost retention.

29 subcircuit courts judgeships were also up for partisan elections due to vacancies. Retention elections were also held for subcircuit courts judgeships.

== Ballot questions ==
Four ballot questions were included on ballots county-wide. One was included on primary ballots in March, while the other three were included on general election ballots in November.

=== March ===
==== Legalize Marijuana ====
A ballot question was referred by the Cook County Board of Commissioners to the voters of Cook County as to whether or not the county's voters advise the State of Illinois to legalize marijuana. All 17 members of the Board of Commissioners had unanimously approved holding this ballot question.

The question asked,

Shall the State of Illinois legalize the cultivation, manufacture, distribution, testing, and sale of marijuana and marijuana products for recreational use by adults 21 and older subject to state regulation, taxation and local ordinance?

Legalize Marijuana ballot question
Candidate	Votes	%
Yes	597,542	68.39
No	276,205	31.61
Total votes	873,747	100
Turnout	{{{votes}}}	28.71%

=== November ===
==== Earned Sick Time ====
A ballot question was created by a successful initiative petition which asked Cook County voters whether to empower each city in Cook County to establish a law that allows workers to earn up to 40 hours a year of sick time.

The ballot measure asked the question,

Shall your municipality match the Cook County earned sick time law which allows for workers to earn up to 40 hours (5 days) of sick time a year to take care of their own health or a family member’s health?

Earned Sick Time ballot question
Candidate	Votes	%
Yes	1,477,938	89.46
No	174,164	10.54
Total votes	1,652,102	100
Turnout	{{{votes}}}	53.45%

==== Gun Dealer Penalties ====
A ballot question was created by a successful initiative petition which asked Cook County voters whether they believed that Illinois should strengthen penalties for the illegal trafficking of firearms and require all gun dealers to be certified by the State.

The ballot measure asked the question,

Should the State of Illinois strengthen penalties for the illegal trafficking of firearms and require all gun dealers to be certified by the State?

Gun Dealer Penalties ballot question
Candidate	Votes	%
Yes	1,517,753	91.51
No	140,796	8.49
Total votes	1,658,549	100
Turnout	{{{votes}}}	53.66%

=== Min Wage 13 ===
A ballot question was created by a successful initiative petition which asked Cook County voters whether to empower each city in Cook County to establish a $13 per hour minimum wage.

The ballot measure asked the question,

Shall the minimum wage in your municipality match the $13 per hour Cook County minimum wage law for adults over the age of 18 by July 1, 2020, and be indexed to the consumer price index after that?

Min Wage 13 ballot question
Candidate	Votes	%
Yes	1,386,214	84.60
No	252,270	15.40
Total votes	1,638,484	100
Turnout	{{{votes}}}	53.01%

== Other elections ==
Coinciding with the primaries, elections were held to elect both the Democratic and Republican committeepeople for the suburban townships.

== See also ==
- 2018 Illinois elections
