= 2020 United States presidential election in Illinois =

- November 3, 2020
- Turnout: 72.92% (▲2.36 pp)

Nominee	Joe Biden	Donald Trump
Party	Democratic	Republican
Home state	Delaware	Florida
Running mate	Kamala Harris	Mike Pence
Electoral vote	20	0
Popular vote	3,471,915	2,446,891
Percentage	57.54%	40.55%

Biden
40–50%
50–60%
60–70%
70–80%
80–90%
90–100%
Trump
40–50%
50–60%
60–70%
70–80%
80–90%
90–100%
Tie/No Data
President before election
Donald Trump
Republican
Elected President
Joe Biden
Democratic

The 2020 United States presidential election in Illinois was held on Tuesday, November 3, 2020, as part of the 2020 United States presidential election in which all 50 states plus the District of Columbia participated. Illinois voters chose electors to represent them in the Electoral College via a popular vote, pitting the Republican Party's nominee, incumbent President Donald Trump of Florida, and his running mate, Vice President Mike Pence of Indiana, against Democratic Party nominee, former Vice President Joe Biden of Delaware, and his running mate, Senator Kamala Harris of California. Illinois had 20 votes in the Electoral College. Prior to the 2020 election, all news organizations predicted Illinois was a state that Biden would win, or otherwise considered a safe blue state.

Biden carried Illinois, winning 57.54% of the vote to Trump's 40.55%. Libertarian nominee Jo Jorgensen, a native of Grayslake, won 1.1% of the state's vote, with other minor candidates winning less than 1%. Illinois was one of five states in the nation in which Biden's victory margin was larger than one million raw votes, the others being California, Maryland, Massachusetts and New York.

Per exit polls by the Associated Press, Biden's strength came from a coalition of key Democratic constituencies: he garnered 92% of votes from Blacks; 70% from Latinos, including 69% of Latinos of Mexican heritage; 53% from union households; and 50% of Whites.

== Primary elections ==
Illinois held its primary elections as scheduled, despite concerns over the COVID-19 pandemic in the United States. Election officials in Illinois acknowledged that they believed turnout was unusually low.

In the state-run primaries (Democratic and Republican), turnout was 28.36%, with 2,279,439 votes cast. The 28.36% turnout marked an 18.2 percentage point decrease from the turnout in the 2016 state-run presidential primaries, but a similar turnout to the 2000, 2004, and 2012 presidential primaries.

The state-run primary elections for the Democratic and Republican parties were held on March 17, 2020. The Green Party had organized its own primary on March 14, 2020.

=== Democratic primary ===
The 2020 Illinois Democratic presidential primary was held on March 17, 2020, as one of the Democratic Party's state primaries ahead of the 2020 presidential election. Major candidates included Joe Biden and Senator Bernie Sanders of Vermont.

2020 Illinois Democratic presidential primary
Candidate	Votes	%	Delegates
Joe Biden	986,661	58.94	95
Bernie Sanders	605,701	36.18	60
Michael Bloomberg (withdrawn) (Note: Candidate withdrew after Super Tuesday during early voting.)	25,500	1.52	
Elizabeth Warren (withdrawn)	24,413	1.46	
Pete Buttigieg (withdrawn) (Note: Candidate withdrew shortly before Super Tuesday during early voting.)	9,729	0.58	
Tulsi Gabbard	9,642	0.58	
Andrew Yang (withdrawn) (Note: Candidate withdrew after the New Hampshire primary when early voting had already begun.)	4,021	0.24	
Cory Booker (withdrawn)	2,684	0.16	
Tom Steyer (withdrawn)	1,684	0.10	
Deval Patrick (withdrawn)	1,567	0.09	
Michael Bennet (withdrawn)	1,346	0.08	
John Delaney (withdrawn)	1,185	0.07	
Total	1,674,133	100%	155

=== Republican primary ===
The 2020 Illinois Republican presidential primary was held on March 17, 2020, in the U.S. state of Illinois as one of the Republican Party's state primaries ahead of the 2020 presidential election.

Incumbent president Donald Trump won the primary with over 96 percent of the vote. Joe Walsh, a former member of the House of Representatives from Illinois, announced the launch of his campaign in August 2019 and dropped out in February 2020. Rocky De La Fuente, a businessman from California, also challenged Trump, achieving 4% of the vote. Richard Mayers, a 2016 Green Party candidate, was a write-in candidate here.

2020 Illinois Republican Party presidential primary
Candidate	Popular vote		Delegates
Candidate	Count	Percentage	Delegates
Donald Trump (incumbent)	520,956	95.98%	67
Rocky De La Fuente	21,833	4.02%	0
Richard Mayers write-in	11	0.00%	0
Total:	542,800	100%	67

=== Green primary ===
2020 Illinois Green Party presidential primary
- March 14, 2020

27 Green National Convention delegates
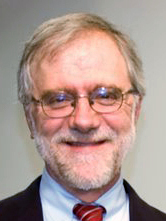

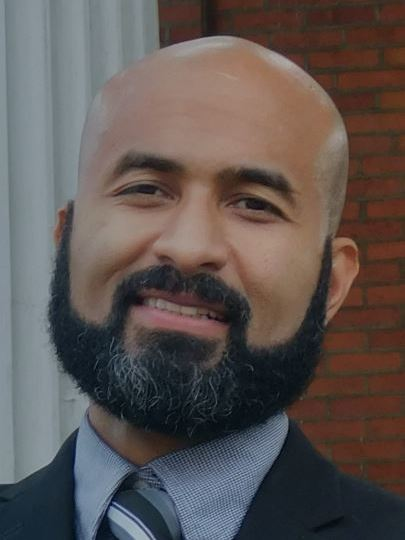
Candidate	Howie Hawkins	Dario Hunter
Party	Green	Green
Home state	New York	California
Delegate count	20	7
Popular vote	unknown	unknown
Percentage	73%	27%

The 2020 Illinois Green Party presidential primary was held from March 14, 2020, in the U.S. state of Illinois as one of the Green Party's state primaries ahead of the 2020 presidential election. It was run by the Green Party of Illinois.

Illinois Green Party presidential primary, March 14, 2020
Candidate	Votes	Percentage	National delegates
Howie Hawkins		73%	20
Dario Hunter		27%	7
Total		100.00%	27

== General election ==
=== Predictions ===
Source	Ranking	As of
The Cook Political Report	Safe D	November 3, 2020
Inside Elections	Safe D	November 3, 2020
Sabato's Crystal Ball	Safe D	November 3, 2020
Politico	Safe D	November 3, 2020
RCP	Likely D	November 3, 2020
Niskanen	Safe D	November 3, 2020
CNN	Safe D	November 3, 2020
The Economist	Safe D	November 3, 2020
CBS News	Likely D	November 3, 2020
270towin	Safe D	November 3, 2020
ABC News	Solid D	November 3, 2020
NPR	Safe D	November 3, 2020
NBC News	Likely D	November 3, 2020
538	Safe D	November 3, 2020

=== Polling ===
View source data.

==== Aggregate polls ====
Source of poll aggregation	Dates administered	Dates updated	Joe Biden Democratic	Donald Trump Republican	Other/ Undecided (Note: Calculated by taking the difference of 100% and all other candidates combined.)	Margin
270 to Win	October 17 – November 2, 2020	November 3, 2020	56.3%	37.7%	6.0%	Biden +18.6
FiveThirtyEight	until November 2, 2020	November 3, 2020	55.0%	39.0%	6.0%	Biden +16.0
Average			55.7%	38.4%	5.9%	Biden +17.3

==== Polls ====
Poll source	Date(s) administered	Sample size (Note: Key: A – all adults RV – registered voters LV – likely voters V – unclear)	Margin of error	Donald Trump Republican	Joe Biden Democratic	Jo Jorgensen Libertarian	Howie Hawkins Green	Other	Undecided
SurveyMonkey/Axios	Oct 20 – Nov 2, 2020	5,643 (LV)	± 2%	40% (Note: Overlapping sample with the previous SurveyMonkey/Axios poll, but more information available regarding sample size)	58%	-	-	–	–
Research Co.	Oct 31 – Nov 1, 2020	450 (LV)	± 4.6%	38%	55%	-	-	1% (Note: "Someone else" with 1%)	6%
Victory Research	Oct 28 – Nov 1, 2020	1,208 (LV)	± 2.82%	38%	54%	-	-	4%	4%
Swayable	Oct 27 – Nov 1, 2020	485 (LV)	± 6%	44%	55%	1%	0%	–	–
SurveyMonkey/Axios	Oct 1–28, 2020	8,056 (LV)	–	41%	57%	-	-	–	–
Swayable	Oct 23–26, 2020	424 (LV)	± 6.2%	43%	54%	2%	1%	–	–
SurveyMonkey/Axios	Sep 1–30, 2020	8,392 (LV)	–	36%	61%	-	-	–	3%
Victory Research	Sep 23–26, 2020	1,208 (LV)	± 2.82%	40%	53%	-	-	4%	3%
SurveyMonkey/Axios	Aug 1–31, 2020	6,773 (LV)	–	38%	60%	-	-	–	2%
SurveyMonkey/Axios	Jul 1–31, 2020	7,565 (LV)	–	38%	59%	-	-	–	2%
SurveyMonkey/Axios	Jun 8–30, 2020	3,000 (LV)	–	39%	59%	-	-	–	2%

=== Results ===
Results by community area: Biden 40–50% 50–60% 60–70% 70–80% 80–90% >90% / Trump 50–60% 60–70%

2020 United States presidential election in Illinois
Party	Candidate	Votes	%	±%
Democratic	Joe Biden Kamala Harris	3,471,915	57.54%	+1.71%
Republican	Donald Trump Mike Pence	2,446,891	40.55%	+1.79%
Libertarian	Jo Jorgensen Spike Cohen	66,544	1.10%	−2.69%
Green	Howie Hawkins Angela Walker	30,494	0.51%	−0.88%
American Solidarity	Brian Carroll Amar Patel	9,548	0.16%	N/A
Socialism and Liberation	Gloria La Riva Leonard Peltier (Note: Peltier was replaced in August 2020 by Sunil Freeman as the Party for Socialism and Liberation's nominee for Vice President. However, his name remains on the ballot in Illinois.)	8,046	0.13%	N/A
Write-in		306	0.01%	−0.23%
Total votes		6,033,744	100.00%	

==== By county ====
County	Joe Biden Democratic		Donald Trump Republican		Various candidates Other parties		Margin		Total votes cast
County	#	%	#	%	#	%	#	%	Total votes cast
Adams	8,633	25.75%	24,220	72.24%	674	2.01%	−15,587	−46.49%	33,527
Alexander	1,114	42.50%	1,486	56.70%	21	0.80%	−372	−14.20%	2,621
Bond	2,288	28.02%	5,625	68.89%	252	3.09%	−3,337	−40.87%	8,165
Boone	10,542	42.09%	13,883	55.43%	1,733	2.48%	−3,341	−13.34%	25,048
Brown	486	19.25%	1,931	76.48%	108	4.27%	−1,445	−57.23%	2,525
Bureau	6,669	38.12%	10,411	59.51%	414	2.37%	−3,742	−21.39%	17,494
Calhoun	677	24.41%	2,046	73.78%	50	1.81%	−1,369	−49.37%	2,773
Carroll	2,748	34.19%	5,105	63.52%	184	2.29%	−2,357	−29.33%	8,037
Cass	1,615	30.32%	3,625	68.06%	86	1.62%	−2,010	−37.74%	5,326
Champaign	57,067	59.71%	35,285	36.92%	3,221	3.37%	21,782	22.79%	95,573
Christian	4,335	26.71%	11,563	71.24%	333	2.05%	−7,228	−44.53%	16,231
Clark	1,993	23.81%	6,226	74.39%	150	1.80%	−4,233	−50.58%	8,369
Clay	1,129	16.36%	5,629	81.59%	141	2.05%	−4,500	−65.23%	6,899
Clinton	4,493	23.38%	14,304	74.45%	417	2.17%	−9,811	−51.07%	19,214
Coles	8,067	35.59%	14,037	61.92%	564	2.49%	−5,970	−26.33%	22,668
Cook	1,725,973	74.22%	558,269	24.01%	41,163	1.77%	1,167,704	50.21%	2,325,405
Crawford	2,202	23.32%	7,043	74.60%	196	2.08%	−4,841	−51.28%	9,441
Cumberland	1,142	19.52%	4,601	78.66%	106	1.82%	−3,459	−59.14%	5,849
DeKalb	24,643	51.35%	21,905	45.65%	1,441	3.00%	2,738	5.70%	47,989
DeWitt	2,191	27.25%	5,632	70.06%	216	2.69%	−3,441	−42.81%	8,039
Douglas	2,335	26.66%	6,227	71.08%	198	2.26%	−3,892	−44.42%	8,760
DuPage	281,222	57.66%	193,611	39.69%	12,930	2.65%	87,611	17.97%	487,763
Edgar	1,887	22.98%	6,193	75.41%	132	1.61%	−4,306	−52.43%	8,212
Edwards	488	14.49%	2,833	84.12%	47	1.39%	−2,345	−69.63%	3,368
Effingham	3,716	19.47%	15,006	78.64%	361	1.89%	−11,290	−59.17%	19,083
Fayette	1,826	18.12%	8,055	79.94%	195	1.94%	−6,229	−61.82%	10,076
Ford	1,754	25.18%	5,048	72.46%	165	2.36%	−3,294	−47.28%	6,967
Franklin	4,760	25.50%	13,622	72.97%	287	1.53%	−8,862	−47.47%	18,669
Fulton	6,503	38.88%	9,867	59.00%	354	2.12%	−3,364	−20.12%	16,724
Gallatin	622	23.25%	2,019	75.48%	34	1.27%	−1,397	−52.25%	2,675
Greene	1,349	21.63%	4,770	76.48%	118	1.89%	−3,421	−54.85%	6,237
Grundy	9,626	35.98%	16,523	61.75%	607	2.27%	−6,897	−25.77%	26,756
Hamilton	824	19.06%	3,432	79.39%	67	1.55%	−2,608	−60.33%	4,323
Hancock	2,315	24.62%	6,906	73.44%	182	1.94%	−4,591	−48.82%	9,403
Hardin	449	20.77%	1,691	78.21%	22	1.02%	−1,242	−57.44%	2,162
Henderson	1,187	32.47%	2,394	65.48%	75	2.05%	−1,207	−33.01%	3,656
Henry	9,797	38.12%	15,300	59.53%	604	2.35%	−5,503	−21.41%	25,701
Iroquois	2,908	20.71%	10,877	77.45%	258	1.84%	−7,969	−56.74%	14,043
Jackson	11,181	49.22%	10,890	47.94%	647	2.84%	291	1.28%	22,718
Jasper	1,007	18.03%	4,494	80.45%	85	1.52%	−3,487	−62.42%	5,586
Jefferson	4,608	26.43%	12,476	71.55%	352	2.02%	−7,868	−45.12%	17,436
Jersey	2,961	24.76%	8,712	72.84%	287	2.40%	−5,751	−48.08%	11,960
Jo Daviess	5,109	40.79%	7,166	57.21%	250	2.00%	−2,057	−16.42%	12,525
Johnson	1,281	19.86%	5,059	78.43%	110	1.71%	−3,778	−58.57%	6,450
Kane	130,166	56.14%	96,775	41.74%	4,935	2.12%	33,391	14.40%	231,876
Kankakee	20,271	40.51%	28,532	57.02%	1,237	2.47%	−8,261	−16.51%	50,040
Kendall	33,168	51.66%	29,492	45.93%	1,545	2.41%	3,676	5.73%	64,205
Knox	10,703	46.12%	12,009	51.75%	496	2.13%	−1,306	−5.63%	23,208
Lake	204,032	60.78%	123,594	36.82%	8,049	2.40%	80,438	23.96%	335,675
LaSalle	22,442	41.80%	30,113	56.09%	1,132	2.11%	−7,671	−14.29%	53,687
Lawrence	1,419	22.10%	4,886	76.08%	117	1.82%	−3,467	−53.98%	6,422
Lee	6,407	38.97%	9,630	58.58%	403	2.45%	−3,223	−19.61%	16,440
Livingston	4,615	26.81%	12,208	70.92%	391	2.27%	−7,593	−44.11%	17,214
Logan	3,840	28.81%	9,136	68.55%	351	2.64%	−5,296	−39.74%	13,327
Macon	19,847	40.07%	28,589	57.72%	1,098	2.21%	−8,742	−17.65%	49,534
Macoupin	7,365	30.60%	16,153	67.11%	552	2.29%	−8,788	−36.51%	24,070
Madison	57,836	42.04%	76,031	55.27%	3,691	2.69%	−18,195	−13.23%	137,558
Marion	4,524	25.86%	12,678	72.47%	292	1.67%	−8,154	−46.61%	17,494
Marshall	2,005	31.60%	4,197	66.15%	143	2.25%	−2,192	−34.55%	6,345
Mason	1,985	29.26%	4,654	68.59%	146	2.15%	−2,669	−39.33%	6,785
Massac	1,725	25.30%	4,997	73.29%	96	1.41%	−3,272	−47.99%	6,818
McDonough	4,992	40.50%	7,027	57.00%	308	2.50%	−2,035	−16.50%	12,327
McHenry	78,154	47.49%	82,260	49.98%	4,164	2.53%	−4,106	−2.49%	164,578
McLean	43,933	50.27%	40,502	46.35%	2,952	3.38%	3,431	3.92%	87,387
Menard	2,022	29.08%	4,764	68.51%	168	2.41%	−2,742	−39.43%	6,954
Mercer	3,280	36.80%	5,418	60.78%	216	2.42%	−2,138	−23.98%	8,914
Monroe	6,569	30.98%	14,142	66.69%	495	2.33%	−7,573	−35.71%	21,206
Montgomery	3,905	28.38%	9,544	69.36%	312	2.26%	−5,639	−40.98%	13,761
Morgan	5,076	33.11%	9,950	64.89%	307	2.00%	−4,874	−31.78%	15,333
Moultrie	1,662	24.60%	4,964	73.48%	130	1.92%	−3,302	−48.88%	6,756
Ogle	9,428	35.79%	16,248	61.69%	664	2.52%	−6,820	−25.90%	26,340
Peoria	43,578	51.90%	38,252	45.55%	2,143	2.55%	5,326	6.35%	83,973
Perry	2,612	25.94%	7,313	72.61%	146	1.45%	−4,701	−46.67%	10,071
Piatt	3,329	33.79%	6,248	63.43%	274	2.78%	−2,919	−29.64%	9,851
Pike	1,484	18.63%	6,332	79.50%	149	1.87%	−4,848	−60.87%	7,965
Pope	433	19.90%	1,722	79.14%	21	0.96%	−1,289	−59.24%	2,176
Pulaski	891	33.87%	1,699	64.58%	41	1.55%	−808	−30.71%	2,631
Putnam	1,338	39.41%	1,993	58.70%	64	1.89%	−655	−19.29%	3,395
Randolph	3,592	24.09%	11,076	74.29%	242	1.62%	−7,484	−50.20%	14,910
Richland	1,830	22.66%	6,089	75.39%	158	1.95%	−4,259	−52.73%	8,077
Rock Island	36,691	54.81%	28,603	42.72%	1,653	2.47%	8,088	12.09%	66,947
Saline	2,789	25.15%	8,103	73.07%	197	1.78%	−5,314	−47.92%	11,089
Sangamon	48,917	46.52%	53,485	50.87%	2,740	2.61%	−4,568	−4.35%	105,142
Schuyler	1,068	27.26%	2,773	70.78%	77	1.96%	−1,705	−43.52%	3,918
Scott	572	20.85%	2,114	77.07%	57	2.08%	−1,542	−56.22%	2,743
Shelby	2,504	20.67%	9,426	77.80%	185	1.53%	−6,922	−57.13%	12,115
St. Clair	68,325	53.17%	57,150	44.47%	3,930	2.36%	11,175	8.70%	128,505
Stark	815	28.24%	2,004	69.44%	67	2.32%	−1,189	−41.20%	2,886
Stephenson	9,055	40.95%	12,521	56.63%	535	2.42%	−3,466	−15.68%	22,111
Tazewell	24,819	35.83%	42,513	61.37%	1,944	2.80%	−17,694	−25.54%	69,276
Union	2,579	28.96%	6,161	69.19%	164	1.85%	−3,582	−40.23%	8,904
Vermilion	10,323	32.62%	20,725	65.50%	594	1.88%	−10,402	−32.88%	31,642
Wabash	1,253	22.35%	4,237	75.57%	117	2.08%	−2,984	−53.22%	5,607
Warren	3,090	39.00%	4,676	59.01%	158	1.99%	−1,586	−20.01%	7,924
Washington	1,641	20.72%	6,115	77.20%	165	2.08%	−4,474	−56.48%	7,921
Wayne	1,187	13.97%	7,176	84.43%	136	1.60%	−5,989	−70.46%	8,499
White	1,517	20.41%	5,791	77.93%	123	1.66%	−4,274	−57.52%	7,431
Whiteside	12,253	44.67%	14,527	52.95%	653	2.38%	−2,274	−8.28%	27,433
Will	183,915	53.11%	155,116	44.80%	7,235	2.09%	28,799	8.31%	346,266
Williamson	10,206	30.26%	22,801	67.60%	723	2.14%	−12,595	−37.34%	33,730
Winnebago	64,056	49.98%	60,861	47.49%	3,243	2.53%	3,195	2.49%	128,160
Woodford	6,160	28.65%	14,799	68.83%	543	2.52%	−8,639	−40.18%	21,502
Totals	3,471,915	57.54%	2,446,891	40.55%	114,938	2.16%	1,025,024	16.99%	6,033,744

Counties that flipped from Republican to Democratic

- McLean (largest municipality: Bloomington)
- Kendall (largest municipality: Oswego)

==== By congressional district ====
Biden won 12 of the 18 congressional districts, with the remaining six going to Trump, including one that elected a Democrat.

District	Biden	Trump	Representative
1st	74%	25%	Bobby Rush
2nd	77%	21%	Robin Kelly
3rd	56%	43%	Dan Lipinski
3rd	56%	43%	Marie Newman
4th	81%	17%	Chuy García
5th	72%	26%	Mike Quigley
6th	55%	43%	Sean Casten
7th	86%	12%	Danny Davis
8th	59%	39%	Raja Krishnamoorthi
9th	71%	27%	Jan Schakowsky
10th	64%	34%	Brad Schneider
11th	62%	36%	Bill Foster
12th	42%	56%	Mike Bost
13th	47%	50%	Rodney Davis
14th	50%	48%	Lauren Underwood
15th	26%	72%	Mary Miller
16th	41%	57%	Adam Kinzinger
17th	48%	50%	Cheri Bustos
18th	37%	61%	Darin LaHood

== Analysis ==
The election was not close with Biden winning by a nearly 17-point margin. Biden only won 14 of the state's 102 counties; however, those 14 counties account for more than half the state's total electorate. Key to Biden's landslide victory was heavily populated Cook County, home of Chicago, which he won with over 74% of the vote. Biden also did well in the suburban (collar) counties of Chicago, winning all of them easily except for McHenry County. Biden also did well in St. Clair County, located in the St Louis metropolitan area. Biden also made history by earning the most votes ever cast in an Illinois presidential election. Biden received 3,471,915 votes. This is more than then-Senator Obama in 2008 when he received 3,419,348, but less than Senator Dick Durbin's 3,615,844 votes in the 2008 Senate race.

Biden flipped McLean County (Bloomington-Normal) and Kendall County (in the Chicago metropolitan area), both of which had voted for Barack Obama in 2008, but then for Mitt Romney in 2012 and Trump in 2016. Biden became the first Democrat since Franklin D. Roosevelt in 1944 to be elected president without winning formerly Democratic leaning Alexander County, solidifying its rural shift towards Republicans in elections; he also became the first to do so without carrying Fulton, Henderson, Henry, Knox, Mercer, Putnam, Warren, or Whiteside counties since Jimmy Carter in 1976.

Illinois was one of seven states, and the District of Columbia, where Trump received a larger percentage of the two-party vote than he did in 2016. (Note: The other six were Arkansas, Florida, Hawaii, Nevada, Utah, and California.) On December 14, Illinois's 20 electors met in the Illinois State Capitol to cast their votes for Biden and Harris formally.

== See also ==
- United States presidential elections in Illinois
- 2020 Illinois elections
- Illinois Fair Tax (2020 ballot referendum)
- 2020 United States elections
  - 2020 United States presidential election
    - 2020 Democratic Party presidential primaries
    - 2020 Republican Party presidential primaries
