= Fritz Kaegi =

American politician

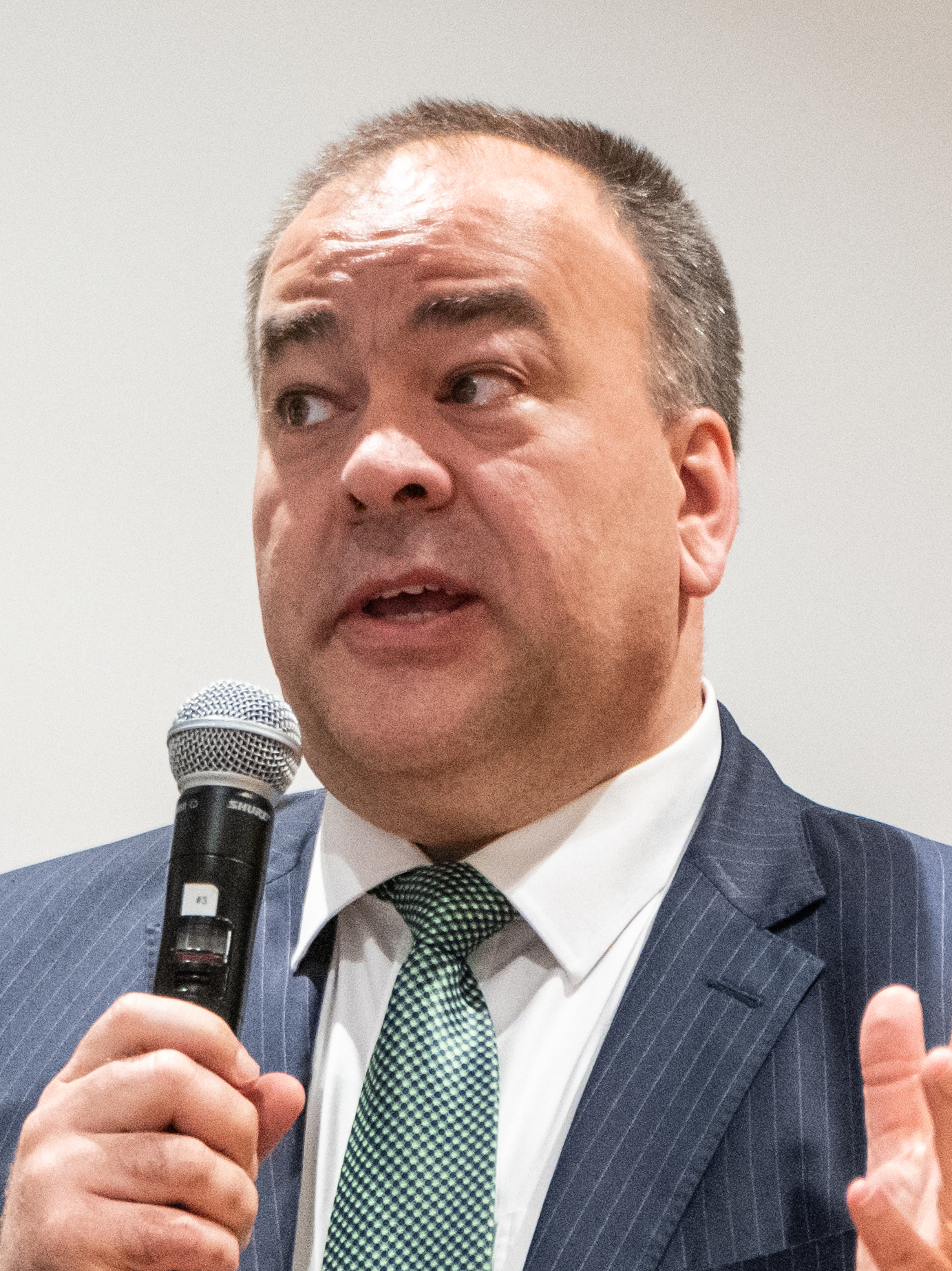
- Kaegi in 2025

10th Assessor of Cook County
- Incumbent
- Assumed office December 3, 2018
- Preceded by: Joseph Berrios

Personal details
- Born: November 1971 (age 53); Chicago, Illinois, U.S.
- Political party: Democratic
- Spouse: Rebecca
- Children: 3
- Education: Haverford College (BA); Stanford University (MBA)

Fredrick "Fritz" Kaegi is an American politician who has served as Cook County assessor since 2018.

== Early life ==
Kaegi was born in November 1971 in Chicago, the son of Louise and University of Chicago Byzantine Empire historian Walter Kaegi. He grew up in the Hyde Park neighborhood of Chicago.

He graduated from Haverford College and went on to get his Master of Business Administration from Stanford University.

== Career ==
For more than twenty years, Kaegi worked as an asset manager. This included 13 years spent working at Columbia Wagner Asset Management.

Kaegi holds the designations of Chartered Financial Analyst and Certified Illinois Assessment Officer. He also is a member of the International Association of Assessing Officers.

=== Cook County Assessor ===
==== 2018 campaign ====
A first-time candidate for public office, Kaegi ran for Cook County assessor in 2018. He largely self-financed his campaign. Kaegi ran as a reformer under the slogan, "No favoritism, just fairness." In the Democratic primary, he defeated embattled incumbent Joseph Berrios. Kaegi originally had appeared to have successfully challenged the ballot petitions of Andrea Raila, kicking her out of the race, thus making the primary a one-on-one race between Kaegi and Berrios. However, Raila still appeared on ballots, as they had already been printed, but no votes were cast for her would be counted. However, after a lawsuit, judges made it so that Raila would be allowed to run, making it a three-person race once again. Berrios was the powerful chairman of the Cook County Democratic Party. During the primary election, Kaegi received the endorsements of the Chicago Sun-Times, Chicago Tribune, and Daily Herald, as well as politicians such as Danny Davis, Bill Foster, Robin Kelly, Mike Quigley, Bobby Rush, and Jan Schakowsky. The Chicago Tribune described his victory against Berrios as a "rare topping of the machine." After defeating Berrios to be the Democratic nominee, Kaegi won the general election against Republican Joseph Paglia.

==== Tenure ====
As assessor, Kaegi began the process of reassessing all of the county's properties, to be done over a three-year period. Kaegi reassessments have been seen as shifting the tax burden from residential to commercial properties. His predecessor, Berrios, had undervalued many commercial properties. Kaegi has received pushback from localities for the increased value assessments he has given to many commercial properties, as localities worry that if commercial property owners successfully appeal to the Cook County Board of Review, there is a risk that local tax bodies will need to give tax refunds to the ownership properties in question.

Amid the COVID-19 pandemic, Kaegi moved to reduce the tax burden on most commercial and residential properties, to account for the pandemic's impact.

== Personal life ==
Kaegi lives in Oak Park, Illinois. He and his wife, Rebecca, have three children.

== Electoral history ==
2018 Cook County Assesor Democratic primary
Party	Candidate	Votes	%
Democratic	Frederick "Fritz" Kaegi	327,769	45.53
Democratic	Joseph Berrios (incumbent)	243,425	33.81
Democratic	Andrea A. Raila	147,224	20.45
Write-in	Others	1,481	0.21
Total votes		719,899	100

2018 Cook County Assessor election
Party	Candidate	Votes	%
Democratic	Frederick "Fritz" Kaegi	1,272,651	76.19
Republican	Joseph Paglia	397,741	23.81
Total votes		1,670,392	100
