= 2020 Illinois elections =

- November 3, 2020
- Turnout: 72.92%

The Illinois general election was held on November 3, 2020. Primary elections, held using an open primary system, took place on March 17, 2020.

== Election information ==
=== Impact of COVID-19 ===
Illinois held its primary elections as scheduled despite concerns over the COVID-19 pandemic in the United States. State election officials believed that this depressed voter turnout.

On June 16, 2020, Governor JB Pritzker signed a bill aimed at making it safer to vote in the November election. To encourage voting by mail, citizens who voted in the primary election, the 2019 local elections, or the 2018 general election were to be sent applications for mail-in ballots by August 1, 2020. The bill also made November 3 a state holiday for schools and government offices, to reduce the number of people present at voting sites.

=== Turnout ===
==== Primary election ====
In the primary election, turnout was 28.36%, with 2,279,439 votes cast. Democratic ballots accounted for 74.80% of ballots, while Republican ballots accounted for 24.72%. Data shows that mail-in ballots likely accounted for roughly 10% of votes cast. Over 636,000 of votes cast were done so as early votes.

Primary election voting occurred amid concerns over the COVID-19 pandemic in the United States, and election officials in Illinois acknowledged that they believed the turnout was unusually low. The turnout rate was an 18.20 percentage point decrease from the turnout in 2016 primaries. However, the turnout was not extraordinarily low, as four out of the past ten Illinois primaries in presidential election years had seen turnout under 30%, with 2000 having seen an even lower primary election turnout than 2020.

Primary election turnout by county

County	Registration	Votes cast	Turnout
Adams	44,360	13,640	30.75%
Alexander	5,296	885	16.71%
Bond	10,614	2,692	25.36%
Boone	33,736	7,525	22.31%
Brown	3,546	1,164	32.83%
Bureau	23,217	4,650	20.03%
Calhoun	3,390	688	20.29%
Carroll	10,480	2,304	21.98%
Cass	7,738	1,506	19.46%
Champaign	119,538	34,497	28.86%
Christian	21,336	4,801	22.50%
Clark	10,928	3,518	32.19%
Clay	9,140	3,353	36.68%
Clinton	25,349	5,207	20.54%
Coles	28,924	7,993	27.63%
Cook (Note: For more on Cook County primary turnout, see 2020 Cook County, Illinois elections#Primary election)	3,094,725	1,037,951	33.54%
Crawford	12,279	3,765	30.66%
Cumberland	7,388	2,412	32.65%
DeKalb	61,419	15,940	25.95%
DeWitt	10,694	3,419	31.97%
Douglas	11,626	3,569	30.70%
DuPage	603,823	157,316	26.05%
Edgar	12,169	3,101	25.48%
Edwards	4,430	1,630	36.79%
Effingham	23,736	8,116	34.19%
Fayette	12,936	3,640	28.14%
Ford	8,760	2,688	30.68%
Franklin	28,986	7,408	25.56%
Fulton	25,362	5,304	20.91%
Gallatin	3,711	1,275	34.36%
Greene	9,104	2,413	26.50%
Grundy	33,335	6,940	20.82%
Hamilton	5,669	2,086	36.80%
Hancock	11,672	4,758	40.76%
Hardin	3,052	837	27.42%
Henderson	4,596	1,318	28.68%
Henry	34,956	6,471	18.51%
Iroquois	17,756	4,563	25.70%
Jackson	30,889	9,497	30.75%
Jasper	6,885	2,799	40.65%
Jefferson	23,277	7,324	31.46%
Jersey	15,020	3,145	20.94%
Jo Daviess	15,882	5,024	31.63%
Johnson	8,519	3,604	42.31%
Kane	305,471	76,969	25.20%
Kankakee	66,206	18,048	27.26%
Kendall	79,468	24,079	30.30%
Knox	32,888	7,362	22.39%
Lake	464,259	109,709	23.63%
LaSalle	70,553	15,987	22.66%
Lawrence	8,912	2,622	29.42%
Lee	22,160	4,690	21.16%
Livingston	21,189	6,126	28.91%
Logan	17,951	5,993	33.39%
Macon	71,263	15,511	21.77%
Macoupin	31,534	7,423	23.54%
Madison	178,321	40,894	22.93%
Marion	24,791	7,611	30.70%
Marshall	8,112	2,332	28.75%
Mason	9,201	2,627	28.55%
Massac	11,117	2,518	22.65%
McDonough	17,800	3,979	22.35%
McHenry	231,610	54,775	23.65%
McLean	109,093	32,418	29.72%
Menard	9,203	1,948	21.17%
Mercer	12,475	2,725	21.84%
Monroe	26,610	5,249	19.73%
Montgomery	16,680	4,222	25.31%
Morgan	22,030	4,483	20.35%
Moultrie	8,422	2,390	28.38%
Ogle	32,659	10,084	30.88%
Peoria	114,952	25,502	22.18%
Perry	14,836	3,524	23.75%
Piatt	12,115	3,447	28.45%
Pike	10,984	2,908	26.47%
Pope	2,987	840	28.12%
Pulaski	4,503	1,455	32.31%
Putnam	4,099	1,071	26.13%
Randolph	20,889	4,186	20.04%
Richland	10,961	4,284	39.08%
Rock Island	87,209	21,052	24.14%
Saline	15,945	4,263	26.74%
Sangamon	134,694	30,127	22.37%
Schuyler	5,099	1,279	25.08%
Scott	3,519	1,583	44.98%
Shelby	14,659	4,714	32.16%
Stark	3,948	782	19.81%
St. Clair	190,075	40,300	21.20%
Stephenson	32,670	6,709	20.54%
Tazewell	91,567	19,035	20.79%
Union	12,551	3,462	27.58%
Vermilion	45,667	13,051	28.58%
Wabash	7,535	2,708	35.94%
Warren	11,918	2,905	24.37%
Washington	9,671	3,105	32.11%
Wayne	10,974	4,296	39.15%
White	10,604	2,758	26.01%
Whiteside	37,330	7,329	19.63%
Will	453,582	115,241	25.41%
Williamson	45,233	10,601	23.44%
Winnebago	179,658	45,303	25.22%
Woodford	25,874	6,109	23.61%
Total	8,036,534	2,279,439	28.36%

==== General election ====
General election turnout was 72.92%. Every county in the state had more than a majority of registered voters cast ballots.

General election turnout by county

County	Registration	Votes cast	Turnout
Adams	44,842	33,795	75.36%
Alexander	5,008	2,641	52.74%
Bond	10,867	8,232	75.75%
Boone	33,455	25,176	75.25%
Brown	3,574	2,545	71.21%
Bureau	23,651	17,609	74.45%
Calhoun	3,453	2,802	81.15%
Carroll	10,424	8,096	77.67%
Cass	7,772	5,358	68.94%
Champaign	127,848	96,185	75.23%
Christian	21,935	16,331	74.45%
Clark	11,188	8,407	75.14%
Clay	9,372	6,929	73.93%
Clinton	26,491	19,317	72.92%
Coles	30,157	22,778	75.53%
Cook (Note: For more on Cook County general election turnout, see 2020 Cook County, Illinois elections#General election)	3,253,333	2,349,010	72.20%
Crawford	12,586	9,497	75.46%
Cumberland	7,599	5,881	77.39%
DeKalb	65,009	48,258	74.23%
DeWitt	10,853	8,083	74.48%
Douglas	11,940	8,808	73.77%
DuPage	641,503	491,067	76.55%
Edgar	12,355	8,251	66.78%
Edwards	4,433	3,391	76.49%
Effingham	24,465	19,186	78.42%
Fayette	13,499	10,169	75.33%
Ford	9,359	7,007	74.87%
Franklin	29,195	18,790	64.36%
Fulton	25,766	16,813	65.25%
Gallatin	3,809	2,701	70.91%
Greene	9,117	6,299	69.09%
Grundy	33,656	26,895	79.91%
Hamilton	5,615	4,372	77.86%
Hancock	11,974	9,467	79.06%
Hardin	3,078	2,186	71.02%
Henderson	4,680	3,705	79.17%
Henry	35,273	25,878	73.36%
Iroquois	17,887	14,121	78.95%
Jackson	31,693	22,895	72.24%
Jasper	6,919	5,623	81.27%
Jefferson	24,196	17,563	72.59%
Jersey	15,587	12,031	77.19%
Jo Daviess	16,537	12,609	76.25%
Johnson	8,576	6,498	75.77%
Kane	318,506	234,751	73.70%
Kankakee	67,051	50,303	75.02%
Kendall	84,165	64,552	76.70%
Knox	33,379	23,401	70.11%
Lake	487,186	337,976	69.37%
LaSalle	73,034	54,087	74.06%
Lawrence	9,122	6,475	70.98%
Lee	22,291	16,547	74.23%
Livingston	22,044	17,334	78.63%
Logan	18,980	13,427	70.74%
Macon	72,049	49,814	69.14%
Macoupin	31,892	24,206	75.9%
Madison	186,358	138,306	74.22%
Marion	25,034	17,600	70.3%
Marshall	8,289	6,382	76.99%
Mason	9,204	6,823	74.13%
Massac	11,070	6,854	61.92%
McDonough	17,771	12,414	69.86%
McHenry	237,640	165,515	69.65%
McLean	115,886	87,968	75.91%
Menard	9,371	6,996	74.66%
Mercer	12,694	8,982	70.76%
Monroe	26,961	21,321	79.08%
Montgomery	16,496	13,870	84.08%
Morgan	22,037	15,430	70.02%
Moultrie	8,657	6,796	78.50%
Ogle	31,786	26,535	83.48%
Peoria	117,380	85,167	72.56%
Perry	14,700	10,146	69.02%
Piatt	12,391	9,934	80.17%
Pike	10,692	8,001	74.83%
Pope	3,014	2,194	72.79%
Pulaski	4,524	2,647	58.51%
Putnam	4,191	3,419	81.58%
Randolph	20,876	15,017	71.93%
Richland	11,028	8,133	73.75%
Rock Island	90,615	67,337	74.31%
Saline	16,063	11,167	69.52%
Sangamon	140,667	106,037	75.38%
Schuyler	5,147	3,945	76.65%
Scott	3,551	2,758	77.67%
Shelby	14,997	12,165	81.12%
Stark	3,988	2,910	72.97%
St. Clair	193,473	129,278	66.82%
Stephenson	33,376	22,251	66.67%
Tazewell	94,022	69,677	74.11%
Union	12,907	8,991	69.66%
Vermilion	46,303	31,881	68.85%
Wabash	7,780	5,641	72.51%
Warren	11,872	7,992	67.32%
Washington	9,971	7,967	79.90%
Wayne	11,193	8,539	76.29%
White	10,010	7,470	74.63%
Whiteside	38,436	27,623	71.87%
Will	463,465	348,071	75.10%
Williamson	47,393	33,909	71.55%
Winnebago	183,378	128,895	70.29%
Woodford	27,214	21,647	79.54%
Total	8,364,099	6,098,729	72.92%

== Federal elections ==
=== United States President ===
Illinois was won by the Democratic ticket of Joe Biden and Kamala Harris.

This was the eighth consecutive presidential election in which Illinois had voted for the Democratic ticket.

=== United States Senate ===
Illinois' Class 2 United States Senate seat was up for election. Incumbent Democrat Dick Durbin won a fifth term.

=== United States House ===
All eighteen of Illinois' congressional seats were up for reelection.

== State elections ==
=== State House of Representatives ===
Elections were held for all 118 seats in the Illinois House of Representatives. Democrats maintained their majority.

=== State senate ===
Elections were held for 22 out of 59 seats in the Illinois Senate. Democrats maintained their supermajority.

=== Judicial elections ===
Elections were held for three seats in the Supreme Court of Illinois and 10 seats in the Illinois Appellate Court.

=== Ballot measure ===
==== Illinois Fair Tax ====
Illinois voters rejected the Illinois Fair Tax amendment, known formally as the "Allow for Graduated Income Tax Amendment", an amendment that appeared on ballots statewide in the general election. This was placed on the ballot by the state legislature in June 2019, and was a key campaign issue in Governor J. B. Pritzker's 2018 election. In order to be approved, the measure had been required to receive either 60% support among those specifically voting on the amendment or 50% support among all ballots cast in the state's election. If it had been approved, the measure would have amended the Constitution of Illinois to allow for a graduated income tax in the state.

Allow for Graduated Income Tax Amendment
Option	Votes	% of votes on measure	% of all ballots cast
For	2,683,490	46.73	44.00
Against	3,059,411	53.27	50.17
Total votes	5,742,901	100	94.17
Voter turnout	68.66%		

== Local elections ==
Local elections are also being held. These include county elections.

=== Cook County ===
In Cook County, elections was held for State's Attorney, Clerk of the Circuit Court, one seat on the Board of Review, 3 seats on the Water Reclamation District Board, and several judgeships in the Circuit Court of Cook County and its subcircuits.

== See also ==
- 2018 Illinois elections
- 2016 Illinois elections
