= Cameron Davis (lawyer) =

American policy expert

Cam Davis
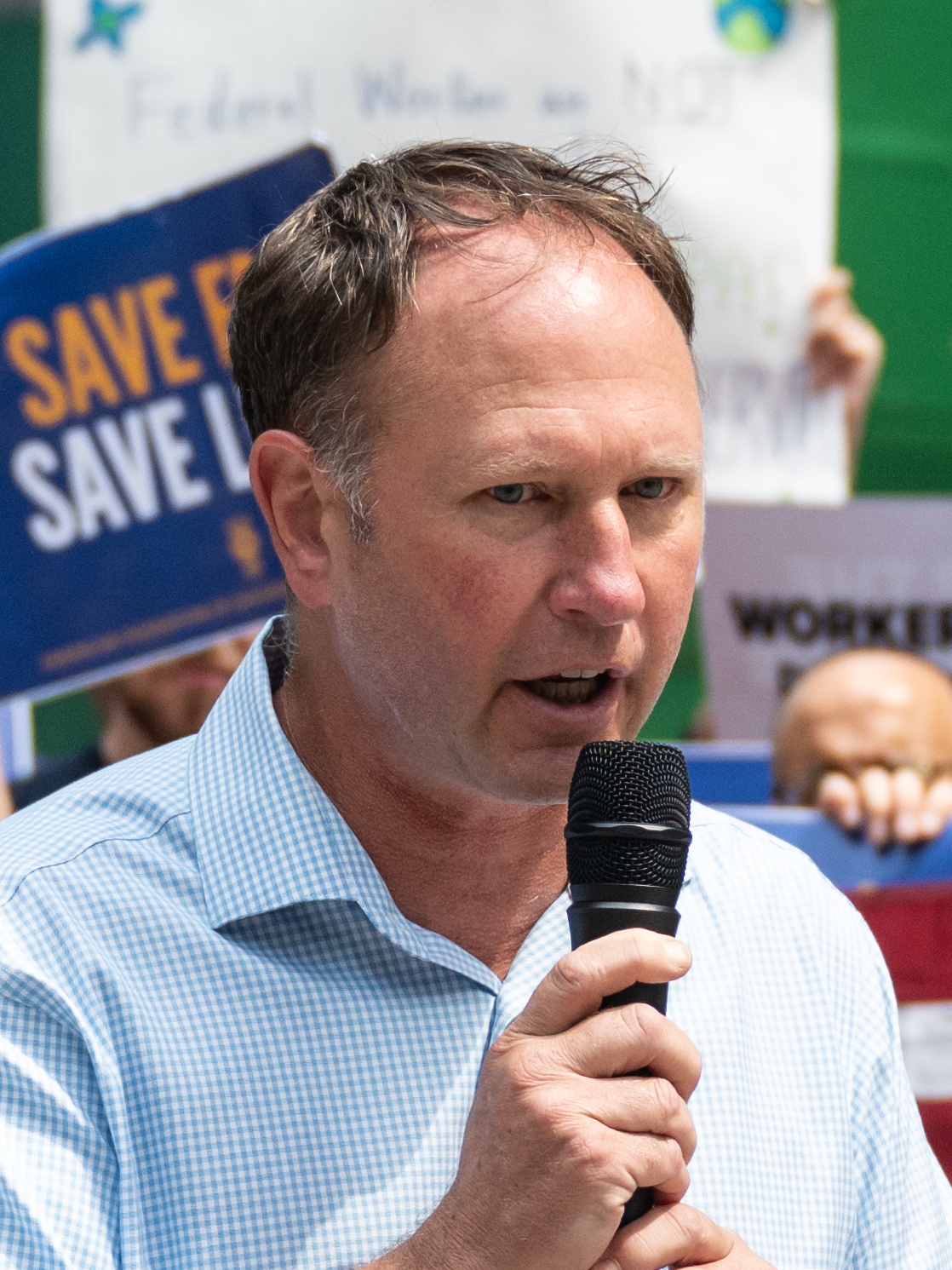
- Davis in 2025

Member of the Metropolitan Water Reclamation District of Greater Chicago Board of Commissioners
- Incumbent
- Assumed office 2018

Personal details
- Born: April 1, 1964 (age 62)
- Party: Democratic
- Education: Boston University (BA); Illinois Institute of Technology (JD)

Cameron "Cam" Davis (born April 1, 1964) served as President Barack Obama's "Great Lakes Czar," is a leading environmental policy expert and lawyer, having served in prominent roles in Chicago and Washington, D.C., including the United States Environmental Protection Agency and Metropolitan Water Reclamation District of Greater Chicago.

== Early life and education ==
Cameron Davis graduated from New Trier High School and Boston University, where he received a Bachelor of Arts degree, majoring in International Relations, with an interest in international environmental affairs. He worked during the day and put himself through night school at Chicago-Kent College of Law, earning his J.D. and certification from the law school's Program in Environmental and Energy Law.

== Early career ==
After college, Davis volunteered for the Lake Michigan Federation as an organizer. As a volunteer, he worked on coastal cleanups and, with the guidance of prominent national environmentalist Lee Botts, organized and participated in public meetings for a stronger Great Lakes Water Quality Agreement between the U.S. and Canada. The two countries amended the Agreement in 1987 to clean up toxic hotspot "Areas of Concern".

From 1992 to 1998, he served as a litigating attorney with the National Wildlife Federation and Adjunct Clinical Assistant professor at the University of Michigan Law School in Ann Arbor.

In 1998, the Lake Michigan Federation's Board of Directors invited Davis to serve the organization in Chicago as executive director. Davis led the effort to strengthen the organization's mission to work on the entire ecosystem and, in 2005, changed the organization to the Alliance for the Great Lakes with unanimous support from the board of directors. The Board appointed him to be president and CEO. In 2007, Davis worked with volunteers to challenge oil giant BP's plans to increase pollution to Lake Michigan, and won. He helped write and pass the Great Lakes Legacy Act to fund Area of Concern cleanups, forge the Great Lakes Water Resources Compact to establish water conservation standards and establish the Adopt-a-Beach program for schools, communities and families, which grew to nearly 10,000 volunteers. Because of these and other efforts during his tenure, the Alliance for the Great Lakes also won the American Bar Association's Distinguished Award in Environmental Law & Policy, the first time for a public interest organization in the honor's history.

== "Great Lakes Czar" ==
After the Brookings Institution produced analyses in 2007 showing at least a 2:1 return on investment for restoring the Great Lakes, in September 2008, the Obama-Biden campaign pledged to establish a $5 billion Great Lakes restoration trust fund and appoint a federal agency coordinator to advance Great Lakes restoration. In June 2009, the Obama Administration announced Davis's appointment to serve as Senior Advisor to the Administrator at the U.S. Environmental Protection Agency to fill the coordinator pledge.

Because of the appointment's importance, the media dubbed the position as a "czar" for cleaning up the Great Lakes and he was immediately attacked by Republicans and other commentators, claiming Davis had been an ACORN Board member with no water management experience. The claims, while repeated often, were false. Meanwhile, industrial leaders praised Davis as "willing to consider the region's business interests" and The Economist deemed him a "respected advocate." Still, in 2010, there was an attempt by representatives outside the Great Lakes region to kill Davis's position and those of other "czars" through legislation.

=== Great Lakes Restoration Initiative ===
In his FY2010 budget, President Obama had established the Great Lakes Restoration Initiative to fund the work of 16 federal agencies within 11 Interagency Task Force departments. Shortly after his appointment, Davis helped write the Action Plan guiding some $300 million per year under this presidential program to clean up Areas of Concern, prevent invasive species, restore habitat, reduce land-based pollution and ensure accountability. The Task Force, including the White House Council on Environmental Quality, Department of Interior, Department of Agriculture, and others, along with several of the region's governors, released the Action Plan, which received praise from Washington Post commentator David Broder.

Also at this time, he helped establish the Invasive Carp Regional Coordinating Committee to create a strategy and guided the Initiative to fund work to address the imminent threat of the fish showing signs of moving toward the Great Lakes. He also helped develop an Administration policy on offshore wind energy and the National Ocean Policy Implementation Plan.

In September 2012, EPA Administrator Lisa P. Jackson signed an updated U.S.-Canada Great Lakes Water Quality Agreement, which continued efforts to clean up Great Lakes Areas of Concern and included new provisions on invasive species, helping communities prepare for changes in the climate, and rebuilding habitat. Davis served as a lead negotiator with the U.S. EPA and U.S. State Department.

In 2012, he began working to build support within the Administration for another five years and, in March 2013, the White House announced its commitment, with Davis coordinating the effort to unify stakeholders around development of a new Action Pan. In September 2014, during a meeting of Great Lakes mayors about drinking water following the shutdown of Toledo's water system the month before, the Administration unveiled its second Great Lakes Restoration Initiative action plan. The program has been praised as a model bipartisan, results-oriented federal conservation initiative.

== Post-federal service ==
As an appointee, Davis left federal service with outgoing President Obama, on January 20, 2017, having served as a "lifer" (serving in both of Obama's presidential terms). In February, he founded www.genoir.com as a small business to help families tell their stories and joined GEI Consultants as vice president, in charge of business development, assistance to tech start-ups and agency-related services to clients in the Midwest.

== Elected office ==
On January 21, 2018, Davis announced he was running for office, seeking the Democratic nomination for one of the nine commissioner positions at the Metropolitan Water Reclamation District of Greater Chicago in the March 20, 2018, primary. Political pundits opined that no one could win, as the race was a "write-in" race, which had never been conducted on a countywide basis in recent memory. The Chicago Sun-Times, Chicago Tribune, Sierra Club, and several prominent elected officials endorsed him within weeks. On April 10, 2018, the Cook County Clerk's Office certified Davis as the winner of the race, with eight opponents (eight fellow Democrats, one Green candidate. The Republican Party did not field or nominate any candidates). Davis won 89% of all valid write-in votes, with 54,183 votes total, beating the previous statewide record for a write-in candidate set in 1944 by Franklin Delano Roosevelt, with 47,561 write-ins.

Three days after the primary, however, Illinois Gov. Bruce Rauner made an appointment until November 2020 for the same office sought by Davis. Critics, including the Chicago Sun-Times contended that the appointment was only valid until the "next regular election," November 2018.

On September 21, 2018, the Metropolitan Water Reclamation District of Greater Chicago filed a lawsuit seeking declaratory judgment about whether the voters should decide in the November general election who should represent them or whether a governor's appointee should get two additional years to serve until November 2020. Attorney Ed Mullen represented Davis. On October 24, Judge Patrick Stanton of the Cook County Circuit Court ruled that Gov. Rauner's appointment was unlawful and that voters were entitled to decide who should fill the seat. On November 6, Cook County voters elected Davis with 1.1 million votes, garnering 75% of returns for the seat. Cook County voters re-elected Davis in 2020 for another six-year term. Since joining the board, Davis has pushed to elevate environmental equity within the agency, led efforts to bring green infrastructure to suburban Cook County schoolyards, and insisted on the "polluter pays principle" for protecting public health from PFAS, also known as forever chemicals.
