= Metropolitan Water Reclamation District of Greater Chicago =

Special-purpose district in Illinois, US

Coordinates: 41°50′N 87°50′W

Agency overview
- Formed: May 29, 1889
- Jurisdiction: Chicago Metropolitan Area
- Headquarters: 100 E Erie St Chicago, IL 60611
- Employees: 2,000
- Website: mwrd.org

The Metropolitan Water Reclamation District of Greater Chicago (MWRD), originally known as the Sanitary District of Chicago, is a special-purpose district chartered to operate in Cook County, Illinois, since 1889. Although its name may imply otherwise, it is not a part of the City of Chicago's local government and, as with all other local agencies, is created by Illinois state government with an elected Board of Commissioners. The MWRD's main purposes are the reclamation and treatment of wastewater and flood water abatement in Cook County to protect the health and safety of citizens and of area waterways. In 1900, the District notably reversed the flow of the Chicago River, and it is currently involved in the large multi-decade construction of the "Deep Tunnel", Tunnel and Reservoir Plan (TARP).

== Organization and administration ==
The MWRD is governed by a nine-member Board of Commissioners elected at large from throughout Cook County, Illinois for six-year terms. Terms are staggered so that three commission chairs are open every two years. Bi-annually the board elects from its members a President, Vice President, and Chairman of Finance. All of the commissioners receive $70,000 per year, except the Vice President and Chairman of Finance receive $75,000, and the President receives $80,000.

Commissioners act as the MWRD's legislative branch establishing policies and procedures for meeting the goals of the District.

=== Board of Commissioners ===
==== Current members ====
Name	Party	Start	End
Kari Steele (President)	Democratic	2012	2030
Patricia Theresa Flynn (Vice President)	Democratic	2022	2028
Marcelino Garcia (Finance Chair)	Democratic	2018	2030
Precious Brady-Davis	Democratic	2023	2030
Yumeka Brown	Democratic	2022	2028
Cam Davis	Democratic	2020	2026
Beth McElroy Kirkwood	Democratic	2024	2030
Eira Corral Sepúlveda	Democratic	2020	2026
Sharon Waller	Democratic	2024	2030

==== Presidents of the board ====
Individuals who served as board presidents with the dates of their tenure listed:

- Murray Nelson (Feb. 1, 1890–Dec. 2, 1890)
- Richard Prendergast (Dec. 2, 1890–Dec. 8, 1891)
- Frank Wenter (Dec. 8, 1891–Dec. 3, 1895)
- Bernard A. Eckhart (Dec. 3, 1895–Dec. 8, 1896)
- Thomas Kelly (Dec. 8, 1896–Dec. 8, 1897)
- William Boldenweck (Dec. 7, 1897–Dec 4, 1900)
- Alexander J. Jones (Dec. 4., 1900–Dec. 3, 1901)
- Thomas A. Smyth first tenure (Dec. 3, 1901–Dec. 8, 1903)
- Zina R. Carter (Dec. 8, 1903–Dec. 4, 1905)
- Robert R. McCormick (Dec. 4, 1905–Dec. 6, 1910)
- Thomas A. Smyth second tenure (Dec. 6, 1910–Dec. 5, 1916)
- Charles H. Sergel (Dec. 5, 1916–Apr. 16, 1920)
- William J. Healy first tenure (Apr. 16, 1920–Dec 30, 1920)
- Lawrence F. King first tenure (Dec. 30, 1920–May 10, 1921)
- William J. Healy second tenure (May 10, 1921–Jul 7, 1921)
- Lawrence F. King second tenure (Jul. 7, 1921–Dec. 7, 1922)
- William J. Healy third tenure (Dec. 7, 1922–Sep. 2, 1924)
- Lawrence F. King third tenure (Sep. 11, 1924–Dec. 7, 1926)
- Timothy J. Crowe (Dec. 7, 1926–Dec. 7, 1928)
- Howard W. Elmore (Dec. 6, 1928–Dec. 2, 1930)
- Thomas J. Boweler (Dec. 2, 1930–Dec. 4, 1934)
- Ross A. Woodhull (Dec. 4, 1936–May 26, 1944)
- James M. Whalen (Jun 29, 1944–Dec. 2, 1926)
- A. F. Maciejewski (Dec. 2, 1946–Dec. 2, 1948)
- J. L. Friedman (Dec 7, 1948–Dec. 5, 1950)
- Anthony A. Olis (Dec. 5, 1950–Jun 3, 1958)
- William F. Patterson (Jun. 12, 1958–Dec. 2, 1958)
- Frank W. Chesrow (Dec. 2, 1958–Dec. 6, 1966)
- John E. Egan (Dec. 6, 1966–Dec. 3, 1974)
- Nicholas J. Melas (Jan. 2, 1975–Dec. 8, 1992)
- Thomas S. Fuller (Jan. 7, 1993–Dec. 3, 1996)
- Kathleen Therese Meaney first tenure (Dec. 3, 1996–Jan. 9, 1997)
- Terrence J. O'Brien (Jan. 9, 1997–Nov. 30, 2012)
- Barbara J. McGowan first tenure (acting president Nov. 30, 2012–Jan 3, 2013)
- Kathleen Therese Meany second tenure (Jan. 2, 2013–Nov. 30, 2014)
- Barbara J. McGowan second tenure (acting president Nov. 30, 2014–Jan 8, 2015)
- Mariyana T. Spyropoulos (Jan. 8, 2015–Jan. 10, 2019)
- Kari K. Steele (Jan 10, 2019–present)

==== Vice presidents of the board ====
Individuals who served as board vice-presidents with the dates of their tenure listed:

- William H. Baker (Dec. 4, 1900–Dec. 3, 1901)
- Frank X. Cloidt (Dec. 3, 1901–Dec. 8, 1903)
- William Legner (Dec. 8, 1903–Dec. 4, 1905)
- Casimer Griglik (Dec. 7, 1948–Dec. 3, 1859)
- Micael J. Rudnick (Dec. 5, 1950–May 17, 1954)
- William S. Nordberg (Jun. 12, 1958–Dec. 2, 1958)
- William F. Patterson (May 19, 1955–Jun. 12, 1958)
- John A. Cullerton (Dec. 3, 1959–Aug. 27, 1961)
- Vincent D. Garrrity (Sept. 7, 1961–Dec. 6, 1966)
- Earl E. Strayhorn (Dec. 6, 1966–Dec. 8, 1970)
- Nicholas J. Melas (Jan. 7, 1971–Jan. 2, 1975)
- Valentine Janicki (Jan. 2, 1975–Dec. 7, 1976)
- William A. Jaskula (Jan. 6, 1977–Jun. 17, 1983)
- Richard J. Troy (Jul. 15, 1983–Dec. 6, 1988)
- Nancy Drew Sheen (Jan 5, 1989–Jan 7, 1993)
- Frank E. Gardner (Jan 7, 1993–Jan. 5, 1995)
- Kathleen Therese Meany (Jan. 5, 1995–Jan. 6, 2011)
- Barbara J. McGowan (Jan. 6, 2011–Nov 30, 2022)
- Kimberly du Buclet (Jan. 5, 2023–May 13, 2023)
- Patricia Flynn (June 15, 2023 – present)

=== Executive leadership ===
The Treasurer is the MWRD's chief financial officer and reports directly to the Board. The Treasurer is charged with maximizing investment interest, issuing bonds to meet capital requirements, managing any debts, and providing general financial management.

The Executive Director also reports directly to the Board and manages the MWRD's day-to-day operations. There are eight departments: Engineering, Finance, Human Resources, Information Technology, Law, Maintenance and Operations, Monitoring and Research, and Procurement and Materials Management. Heads of these departments report to the Executive Director as do the staff and support units of Administrative Services which includes the Diversity, Environmental Justice, Management and Budget, and Public Affairs sections.

The Executive Director is Brian A. Perkovich.

== Public participation ==
Public meetings are held twice per month (except during July and August) in the board room at 100 E. Erie Street, Chicago, IL. An electronic copy of the agenda is available via the MWRD's website about three days prior to each meeting.

At least one public hearing is held between 10 and 20 days after new tentative budgets are made available to the public.

== History ==
Originally established as the Sanitary District of Chicago, the Metropolitan Water Reclamation District of Greater Chicago (MWRD) has played a vital role in the history and health of the city of Chicago and 125 surrounding suburbs of Cook County, Illinois. The Sanitary District Enabling Act of May 29, 1889, established the District with the purpose of managing water supply and wastewater issues. Two important early projects included the reversal of the Chicago River, designed to carry wastewater away from Lake Michigan, and the construction of the Chicago Sanitary and Ship Canal in 1900 which aided in the flow of water away from Lake Michigan, the source of the region's drinking water. The Sanitary and Ship Canal was so successful that two more canals were built. In 1910, the North Shore Channel was completed to provide drainage for the marshy areas north of the city and to direct lake water into the North Branch of the Chicago River for dilution. The Cal-Sag Channel was ready for operation in 1922, which also was the year the first treatment plant of the Sanitary District of Chicago was completed. The Cal-Sag Channel reversed the flow of the Calumet Rivers.

Although the District's first assignment in reversing the flow of the river and constructing a vast network of waterways was clear, establishing itself was the first hurdle. There was a sense of urgency creating a sanitary district due to a booming population, the fear of waterborne illness, the quality of the drinking water supply in Lake Michigan and a contaminated river, but two previous attempts at legislation in the Illinois General Assembly had been stalled over concerns of discharging used water downstream. A special commission consisting of Chicago Mayor John Roche, two members of the Illinois House and two members of the Illinois Senate were appointed to gather public opinion and then buy-in for another round of legislation. The committee proposed constructing a canal wide enough to accommodate steamboat traffic, satisfying downstate interests. The chance to promote economic development linking the Great Lakes to the Gulf of Mexico ultimately persuaded the rest of the state to adopt legislation. On May 29, 1889, the General Assembly approved "an Act to Create Sanitary Districts and to Remove Obstructions in the Des Plaines and Illinois Rivers." The Enabling Act required a referendum establishing the boundaries of the District, roughly covering 185 square miles from the lakefront west to Harlem Avenue and from Devon Avenue on the north to 87th Street on the south. The District's services were in such demand that the residents living in the proposed area voted in a landslide 70,958 to 242 in favor of its creation.

As the District established a new Chicago Area Waterway System (CAWS), new advancements in water treatment technology were made, leading to the creation of treatment plants and interceptor sewers that conveyed water from local collection systems to the plants for treatment. The MWRD constructed 560 miles of intercepting sewers and force mains ranging in size from 6 inches to 27 feet in diameter. The intercepting sewers are fed by approximately 10,000 local sewer system connections and are critical in managing stormwater and preserving the waterways.

From 1955 through 1988, the District was called The Metropolitan Sanitary District of Greater Chicago. In order to provide a more accurate perception of the District's current functions and responsibilities, the name was changed effective, January 1, 1989, to Metropolitan Water Reclamation District of Greater Chicago by the Metropolitan Water Reclamation District Act. Archives of the construction and repair of Chicago's sewers are stored both physically and digitally as the Chicago Sewers Collection at the Harold Washington Library Center.

== Lockport Powerhouse ==
The Lockport Powerhouse, located on the Main Channel Extension, Lockport, Illinois, was built in 1907 and marks the southwestern extent of the MWRD-managed Chicago Area Waterway System (CAWS). The Powerhouse is located right before the Chicago Sanitary and Ship Canal connects with the Des Plaines River. The facility is an integral part of the MWRD's task of managing the CAWS and reducing the risk of flooding throughout the MWRD service area. The Lockport Powerhouse enables the MWRD to control the levels of the canal. In addition to its role in managing the waterways, the Lockport Powerhouse also provides financial benefits from hydroelectric power generation. The water flowing through the facility is harnessed by 2 turbines to provide a safe and environmentally friendly hydroelectric energy source that is sold back to Commonwealth Edison. Lockport generates over $1 million worth of electricity annually. Annual power generation (in kilowatt hours) and revenue amounts for the Lockport Powerhouse by year:

2022	21,929,152 kWh	$836,182.59
2021	32,499,834 kWh	$779,450.48
2020	37,608,633 kWh	$868,630.58
2019	41,131,268 kWh	$1,093,794.89
2018	42,004,233 kWh	$1,135,079.84
2017	37,583,707 kWh	$1,041,780.24
2016	35,595,896 kWh	$990,097.68
2015	41,595,703 kWh	$1,299,793.17
2014	41,518,650 kWh	$1,390,418.00
2013	33,070,255 kWh	$1,012,462.00
2012	23,589,171 kWh	$ 686,081.00*
2011	42,412,425 kWh	$1,341,578.13
2010	36,333,757 kWh	$1,093,103.26
2009	50,638,344 kWh	$1,978,605.23
2008	49,021,024 kWh	$2,728,545.44
2007	44,586,717 kWh	$1,759,241.20
2006	40,946,609 kWh	$1,742,566.04
2005	38,014,571 kWh	$1,741,079,14
2004	38,677,031 kWh	$1,769,698.61
2003	36,352,051 kWh	$1,658,073.69
2002	42,389,222 kWh	$1,949,350.25

*No recorded rainfall in 2012.

== Responsibilities and programs ==
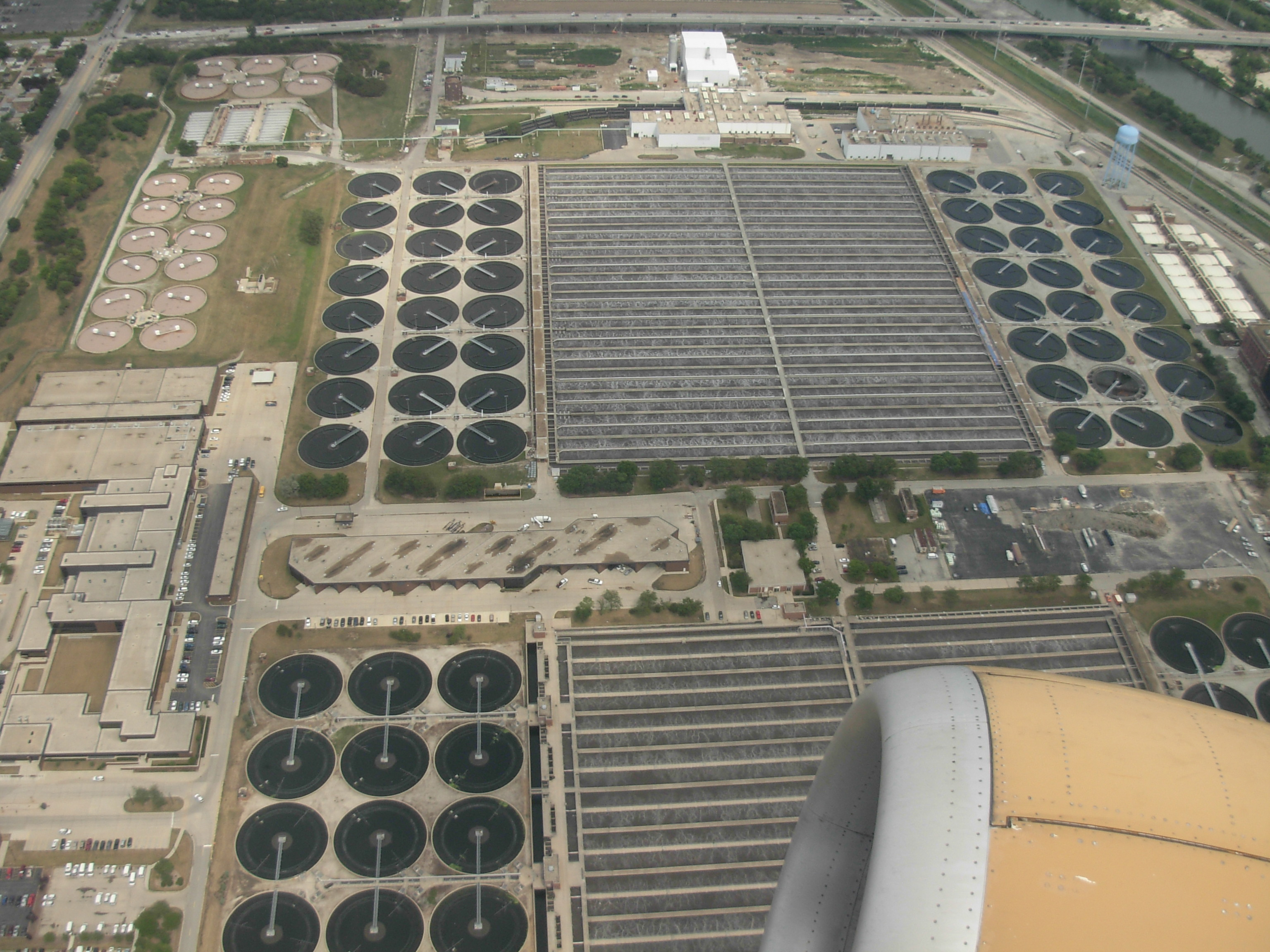
Stickney Water Reclamation Plant

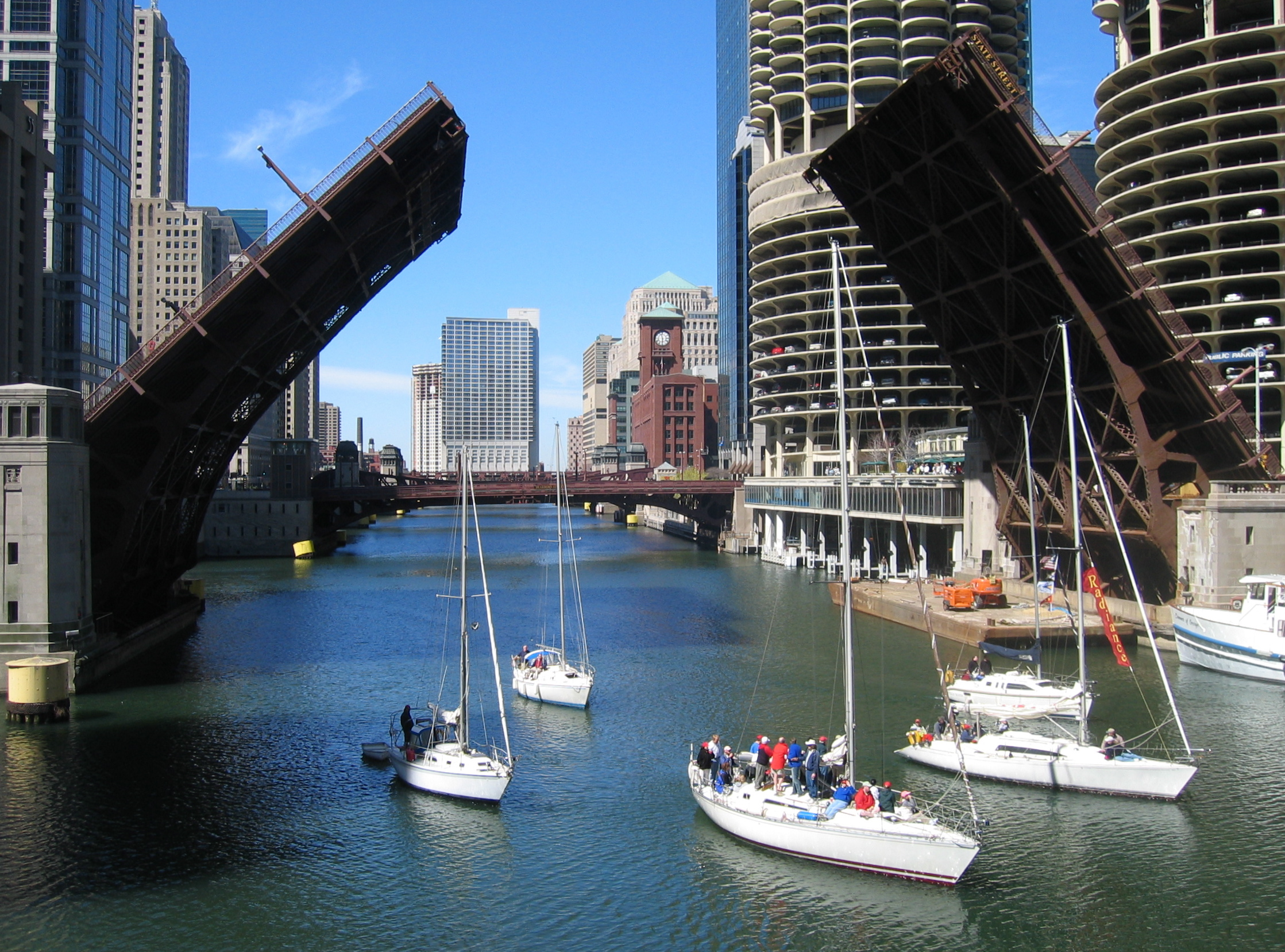
State Street Bridge

The District's territory covers approximately 91% of land area and 98% of the valuation of Cook County, Illinois; and, unlike other sanitary districts, the district has the power to operate facilities outside its boundaries. It serves an area of 883 square miles (2,290 km^{2}) which covers the City of Chicago and 128 suburban municipalities. The District's 560 miles (900 km) of intercepting sewer mains are linked to approximately 10,000 local connections. The MWRD employs nearly 2,000 people.

=== Water reclamation ===
In 1919, the Board of Commissioners passed an ordinance committing the MWRD to construct and operate sewage treatment plants to protect and preserve Lake Michigan, the source of drinking water for six million people living in Chicago, Cook County communities, and neighboring counties. The MWRD operates the largest water reclamation plant in the United States, the Stickney Water Reclamation Plant in Cicero, Illinois, in addition to six other plants and 23 pumping stations. These seven plants range in capacity from 1.44 billion gallons per day at the Stickney Plant to 4 million gallons per day at the Lemont Plant.

A water reclamation facility usually contains two treatment plants. One is for processing the wastewater while the other is for treating the solids captured during the first process.

Approximately 454 billion US gallons (1.72×10^{9} m^{3}) were treated at the District plants during 2017. These plants have been very successful in meeting their National Pollutant Discharge Elimination System (NPDES) permit limits. These limits are designed to protect and enhance the quality of surface waters.

The 2017 average plant flow, effluent values, and permit compliance for each plant are presented below in Table 1.

Table 1. Water Reclamation in 2017
Plant	Flow (MGD)	Effluent (mg/L)			Permit Violations	Permit Compliance
Plant	Flow (MGD)	CBOD	SS	NH4-N	Permit Violations	Permit Compliance
Stickney WRP	677	2	5	0.5	1	99.94%
Calumet WRP	256	3	6	0.4	0	100%
O'Brien WRP	232	2	6	0.6	0	100%
Kirie WRP	41.77	2	2	0.3	0	100%
Egan WRP	23.9	2	2	0.1	0	100%
Hanover Park WRP	9.50	3	5	0.3	0	100%
Lemont WRP	2.56	4	8	-	0	100%
CBOD: Carbonaceous biochemical oxygen demand. SS: Suspended Solids. NH4-N: Ammonia nitrogen.

The MWRD treats an average 1.5 billion US gallons (5,700,000 m^{3}) of wastewater each day. It also shares responsibility with the Army Corps of Engineers for the Chicago Area Waterway System (CAWS), including the Chicago Sanitary and Ship Canal and approximately 76 miles (122 km) of waterways, part of a national system connecting the Atlantic Ocean, Great Lakes, and the Gulf of Mexico.

=== Tunnel and Reservoir Plan ===
The MWRD oversees one of the largest civil engineering projects ever undertaken—the Tunnel and Reservoir Plan (TARP), better known as the "Deep Tunnel Project". It includes over one hundred miles of tunnels, 9 to 33 feet (10 m) in diameter, each part of an extensive flood mitigation and pollution control project. The first phase of TARP was completed in 2006 and consists of 109.4 miles of deep, large diameter tunnels that have a total storage capacity of 2.3 billion gallons; the tunnels have provided millions of dollars in flood protection benefits. TARP's large tunnels and reservoirs are designed to reduce the amount of combined sewer overflows (CSOs) and hold the polluted water until it can be fully treated at MWRD water reclamation plants. Since the TARP tunnels went online, the average annual number of days with CSOs has been reduced to 50 from 100. The second phase of TARP involves the construction of three reservoirs which, when completed in 2029, will provide more than 18 billion gallons of storage capacity. Since 1998, when the MWRD executed an agreement with the owner of the Thornton quarry to mine the north lobe of the quarry for use as a component of TARP, over 152 billion pounds of 400 million year old dolomite limestone was blasted and removed. Located along interstate 80 in southern Cook County, the Thornton Composite Reservoir, an important component of the MWRD's TARP, went into operation on December 31, 2015. The Thornton Composite Reservoir came online at the same time as disinfection facilities at the MWRD's Calumet Water Reclamation Plant in Chicago, which also serves the southern area of the county. Working in tandem, the combination maximize water quality while minimizing flooding. The third and final piece of TARP is the McCook Reservoir. Stage 1 of McCook Reservoir was completed on December 31, 2017, and adds 3.5 billion gallons of storage capacity. Stage 2 of McCook Reservoir will add 6.5 billion gallons of storage capacity when it comes online in 2029.

=== Stormwater management authority ===
In 2004, the Illinois General Assembly granted the MWRD stormwater management authority for Cook County, and since that time, the MWRD has been working to address regional flooding issues. In October 2013, the MWRD Board of Commissioners unanimously approved the Cook County Watershed Management Ordinance (WMO). The WMO provides uniform stormwater management regulations for Cook County in order to prevent future commercial, municipal, and residential development and redevelopment projects from exacerbating flooding. The WMO can be downloaded at http://wmo.mwrd.org.

=== Disinfection ===
In June 2011, the MWRD Board of Commissioners voted to implement disinfection technology at the Calumet WRP in Chicago and the North Side (O'Brien) WRP in Skokie. By March, 2012, the MWRD selected the optimal technology for disinfecting the treated water at the Calumet and O'Brien Water Reclamation Plants after a blue ribbon task force evaluated all available disinfection technologies using a triple bottom line approach that considered economic, environmental and social criteria. On September 16, 2013, former U.S. Environmental Protection Agency Region 5 Administrator Susan Hedman, former Illinois Environmental Protection Agency Director Lisa Bonnett, State Rep. Robyn Gabel, Skokie Mayor George Van Dusen and other area representatives joined the MWRD Board of Commissioners to break ground on the disinfection facility at the O'Brien WRP. Significant support for these projects came from local, state and federal leadership. In 2011, U.S. Senators Richard Durbin and Mark Kirk and Congressman Mike Quigley toured the Chicago area waterways and announced their support for the disinfection projects. In April 2012, Chicago Mayor Rahm Emanuel, former Illinois Governor Pat Quinn, and the U.S. EPA awarded the MWRD $10 million through the Illinois Jobs Now! capital program. That funding supplemented the $21 million in engineering and design costs needed to make the MWRD's disinfection facilities possible. In addition to directly improving the water environment, the two disinfection projects created 750 construction, operations and support jobs. Construction was completed by December 2015 and disinfection was in service for the 2016 recreational season.

=== Resource recovery ===
Since its inception, the MWRD has worked to improve the environment and protect public health, but the way it views its work has evolved since 1889. Sewage is no longer a waste product but instead a collection of resources to be recovered and reused. The MWRD is implementing several innovations in renewable energy, while also recovering and developing reuse opportunities for algae, biosolids, water, phosphorus and other nutrients collected during the water treatment process.

==== Algae ====
Algae naturally uptakes phosphorus and nitrogen from water to support its growth through photosynthesis, utilizing the sun as its energy source. This same approach can be applied to wastewater treatment as a means to remove phosphorus from the waste stream without the use of inorganic chemicals or additional energy, which is the current means of nutrient removal. The MWRD is researching the sustainability of growing algae in a "vertical revolving" fashion; this would reduce the footprint to grow an equivalent algae biomass in a surface pond and simplify the harvesting process. The algae could remove at least 50 percent of phosphorus from wastewater and can be harvested and commoditized for production of bioplastics, biochemicals, biofuels, pharmaceuticals and dyes; or used as fertilizer or as aquaculture feed. The MWRD is also experimenting with algae as a nutrient remover at the O'Brien WRP. It can be used as fertilizer, in a digester, or as aquaculture feed, which returns the phosphorus to the nutrient cycle. The MWRD can produce 24 tons of algae a day. This could potentially stimulate the Chicago regional economy by locating a plastics partner near the treatment plant and reduce reliance on petroleum. The MWRD is supporting leading-edge research in this field to help make algae technology a practical and sustainable approach to nutrient management for urban wastewater treatment plants. During the water treatment process, the greenhouse research facility at the O'Brien WRP employs a technology called revolving algae biofilm reactors designed by Iowa State University scientists who originally applied it for agricultural applications.

==== Biosolids ====
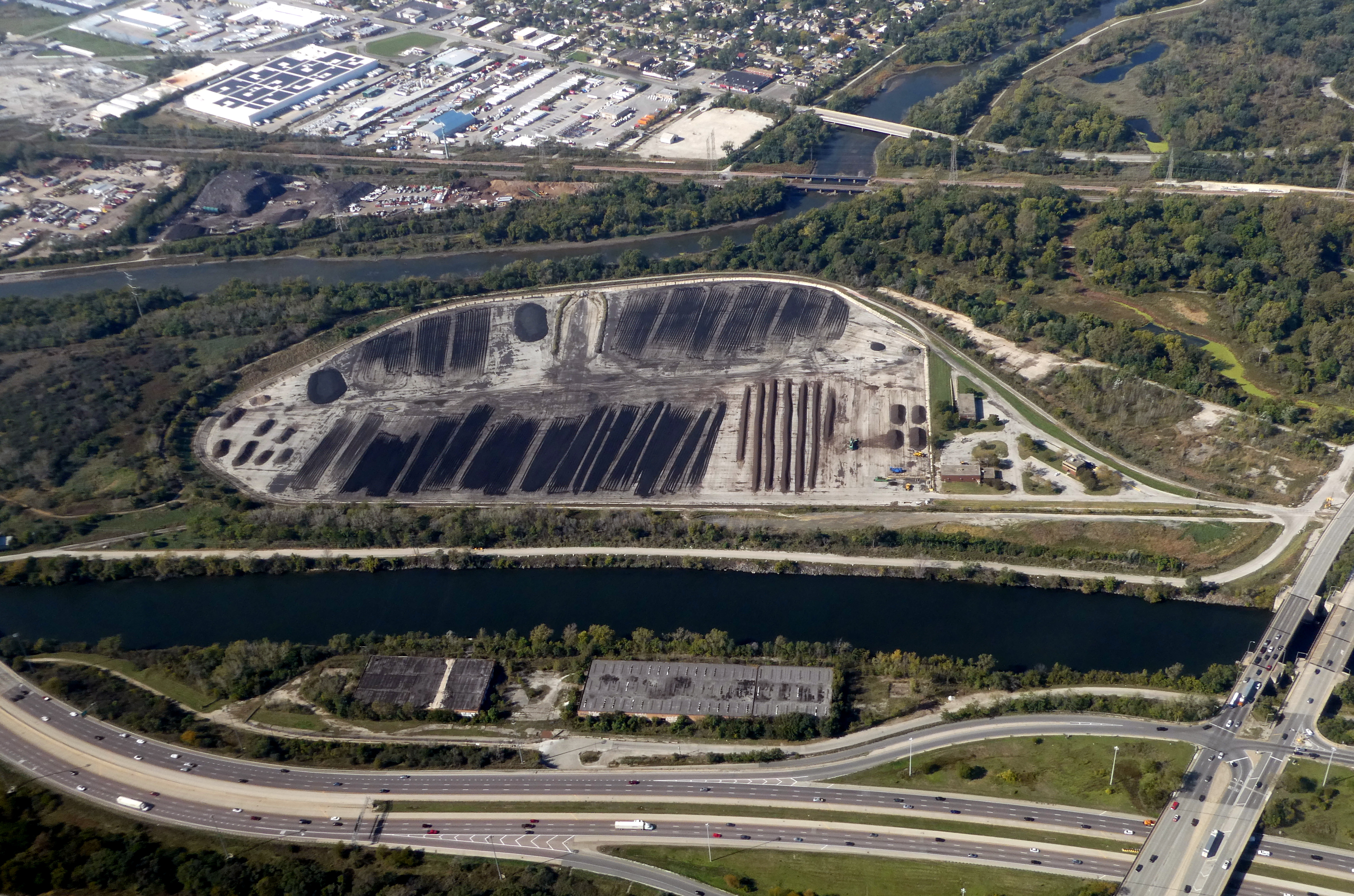
Harlem Avenue Solids Management Area

Biosolids are an environmentally friendly product of the water treatment process that supplies organic matter and improves soil structure and porosity to allow plants to more effectively utilize nutrients. Under the Illinois Environmental Protection Act, signed into law in 2015, biosolids were formally recognized as a safe, beneficial and renewable resource that should be used locally. Rather than being hauled miles to distant farms and landfills as in years past, the biosolids are now beneficially reused in Cook County. Air-dried biosolids look and feel like dark, fine-textured topsoil, and are used on turfgrass at golf courses, athletic fields, parks and other recreational areas, and for restoration of brownfields and other disturbed lands. To create a value-enhanced product, the MWRD partnered with the city of Chicago to co-compost woodchips from the city's routine tree trimming program and woodchips collected from ash trees lost due to the emerald ash-borer devastation to create a compost ratio of 3:1 woodchips to biosolids. The compost is produced in windrows that are maintained at a temperature of at least 131 degrees for a minimum of 15 days and are turned five times during the period as required in USEPA protocol. The active composting period is followed by four months of curing after which the product is screened through a half-inch screen to remove large pieces of woodchips and tested.

==== Water reuse ====
The MWRD produces 1.2 billion gallons of clean water each day. Draining freshwater resources from Lake Michigan is not always necessary for industrial use. In 2017, the MWRD Board of Commissioners established an introductory price of $1 per thousand gallons for the clean water they produce with the flexibility to adjust the price based on market conditions. They partnered with American Water and set a goal of supplying reused water to the industrial sector at the rate of about 10 million gallons per day. Industrial users pay higher prices for fresh Lake Michigan water. The MWRD believes water can be used more than once and provide value. Less energy is also used to deliver that water, and more fresh water from the region's drinking supply in Lake Michigan is also conserved. In addition to being harnessed, water itself is also reused directly by the treatment process. Every day, 15.1 million gallons are reused in pipeline flushing, blower motor cooling, post-centrifuge centrate flushing, and tank cleaning. At the Stickney Water Reclamation Plant, 6 million gallons of treated water per day is used, saving energy and money and reducing demand on drinking water. In addition, the MWRD is pursuing additional reuse applications for the high quality water produced at water reclamation plants. Working with large industrial users in the Calumet and Stickney corridors to find reuse opportunities could provide cost savings to the industrial users and increase fresh water availability for communities.

==== Sewerthermal energy ====
The MWRD and University of Illinois at Chicago developed a new energy source using an $87,500 grant provided by the Illinois Clean Energy Community Foundation in 2010; the funding helps to cover the total $175,000 cost. The partnership resulted in significant energy and cost savings at the Kirie Water Reclamation Plant (WRP). Savings include a 25 to 50 percent reduction in electricity usage for heating and cooling needs as well as reductions in maintenance expenses and pollutants associated with separate heating and cooling systems.University of Illinois news The Kirie WRP has a daily average flow of 52 million gallons per day (MGD), a capacity of 100 MGD and operates 24 hours per day, 7 days a week, 52 weeks per year. The Kirie WRP serves 65.2 square miles and approximately 217,000 people. The MWRD originally embarked on the project due to increases in energy costs and the desire to become more environmentally friendly.

The Kirie system is one of the first to use wastewater for heat recovery and provides the MWRD with the opportunity to evaluate both open and closed loop systems for efficiency and overall performance. The MWRD and UIC worked to develop a feasibility study for the Kirie WRP, including system design, equipment requirements, historical system data, space requirements and installation.

The sewerthermal heat and cooling system harnesses energy from treated water and supplies the Kirie WRP with up to 40 percent of its heating and cooling energy needs. This plan provides a model for heating and cooling energy needs at other MWRD facilities. The sewerthermal system will take advantage of relatively constant high temperatures of effluent water and will use only 20 percent or less power than what is needed for a traditional, direct heating system. Rather than extracting heat from the ground as is common for geothermal systems, the MWRD's system is designed to extract heat from the effluent water, which holds a steady minimum temperature of 55 degrees Fahrenheit.

== See also ==
- Centennial Fountain
- Illinois and Michigan Canal
- Jardine Water Purification Plant
- Lockport Powerhouse
- Chicago 1885 cholera epidemic myth
