= 2026 United States House of Representatives elections in Illinois =

- November 3, 2026

All 17 Illinois seats to the United States House of Representatives
	Majority party	Minority party
Party	Democratic	Republican
Last election	14	3
Seats won	14	3
Seat change	Steady	Steady
Popular vote	2,622,224	1,528,910
Percentage	62.85%	36.65%
Swing	▲10.07%	▼10.32%

Democratic:
50–60%
60–70%
70–80%
80–90%
Republican:
50–60%
60–70%
70–80%
80–90%

The 2026 United States House of Representatives elections in Illinois were held on November 3, 2026, to elect the 17 U.S. representatives from the state of Illinois, one from each of the state's congressional districts. The elections coincided with other elections to the House of Representatives, elections to the United States Senate, and various state and local elections. Primary elections were held on March 17, 2026.

== District 1 ==
2026 Illinois's 1st congressional district election

Nominee	Jonathan Jackson	Christian Maxwell
Party	Democratic	Republican
- Jackson: 80–90% Maxwell: 50–60%
Incumbent U.S. Representative
Jonathan Jackson
Democratic

The 1st district is based in the South Side of Chicago, including portions of Bronzeville, Hyde Park, Grand Crossing, Morgan Park, and Roseland, but also reaches down to the southwest and takes in a collection of exurban and rural areas in Cook County, Will County, and Kankakee County, including New Lenox and Homer Glen. The incumbent is Democrat Jonathan Jackson, who was elected with 65.8% of the vote in 2024.

=== Democratic primary ===
==== Nominee ====
- Jonathan Jackson, incumbent U.S. representative

==== Endorsements ====
Endorsements in bold were made after the primary elections.

Jonathan Jackson

Labor unions

- American Federation of Government Employees
- Chicago Federation of Labor
- Chicago Teachers Union
- Illinois AFL-CIO
- International Union of Operating Engineers Locals 150 and 399
- Plumbers Local 130
- SEIU Healthcare
- SEIU Illinois State Council

Organizations

- Citizen Action Illinois
- **Giffords**
- J Street
- Planned Parenthood Action Fund
- Progressive Democrats of America

==== Fundraising ====
Campaign finance reports as of February 25, 2026
Candidate	Raised	Spent	Cash on hand
Jonathan Jackson (D)	$311,224	$269,895	$95,017
Source: Federal Election Commission

==== Results ====
Democratic primary results
Party	Candidate	Votes	%
**Democratic**	**Jonathan Jackson (incumbent)**	**89,662**	**100.0**
Total votes		**89,662**	**100.0**

=== Republican primary ===
==== Nominee ====
- Christian Maxwell, entrepreneur

==== Eliminated in primary ====
- Marcus Lewis, postal worker and nominee for this district in 2024

==== Endorsements ====
Declined to endorse

Newspapers

- Chicago Tribune

==== Fundraising ====
Campaign finance reports as of December 31, 2025
Candidate	Raised	Spent	Cash on hand
Christian Maxwell (R)	$20,729	$328	$24,483
Source: Federal Election Commission

==== Results ====
Republican primary results
Party	Candidate	Votes	%
**Republican**	**Christian Maxwell**	**12,472**	**64.5**
Republican	Marcus Lewis	6,858	35.5
Total votes		**19,330**	**100.0**

=== General election ===
==== Predictions ====
Source	Ranking	As of
Decision Desk HQ	Safe D	July 14, 2026
The Cook Political Report	Solid D	February 6, 2025
Inside Elections	Solid D	December 5, 2025
Sabato's Crystal Ball	Safe D	July 15, 2025

==== Fundraising ====
Campaign finance reports as of April 25, 2026
Candidate	Raised	Spent	Cash on hand
Jonathan Jackson (D)	$352,025	$316,332	$89,382
Christian Maxwell (R)	$32,135	$1,066	$35,123
Source: Federal Election Commission

==== Results ====
2026 Illinois 1st congressional district election
Party	Candidate	Votes	%	±%
Democratic	Jonathan Jackson (incumbent)			
Republican	Christian Maxwell			
Total votes				

== District 2 ==
2026 Illinois's 2nd congressional district election
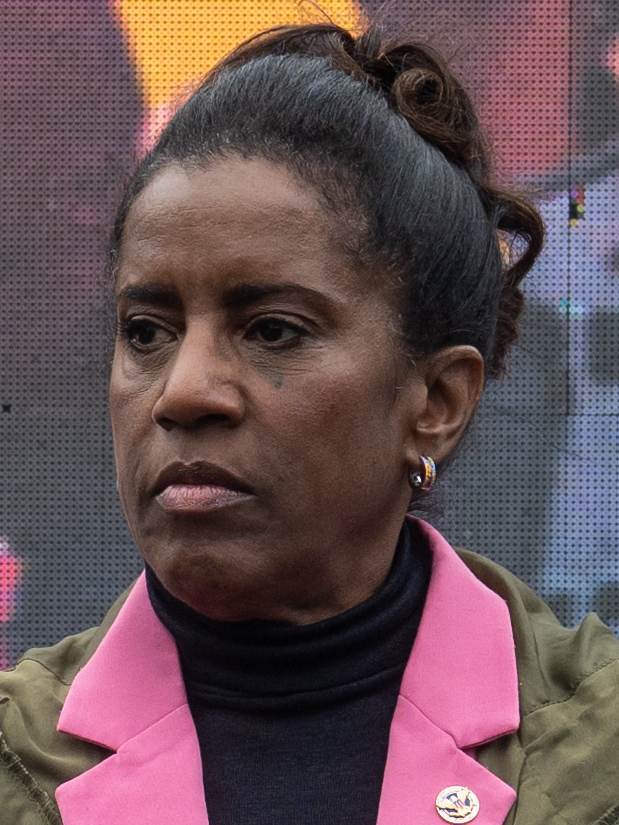

Nominee	Donna Miller	Michael Noack
Party	Democratic	Republican
- Miller: 60–70% 90–100% Noack: 50–60% 60–70% 70–80%
Incumbent U.S. Representative
Robin Kelly
Democratic

The 2nd district includes the far southeast portion of Chicago and part of its southern suburbs, as well as portions of Will, Kankakee, Iroquois, and Vermillion counties along the Indiana border. The incumbent is Democrat Robin Kelly, who was re-elected with 67.6% of the vote in 2024. Kelly retired to unsuccessfully run for the concurrently-held U.S. senate election.

=== Democratic primary ===
==== Nominee ====
- Donna Miller, Cook County commissioner from the 6th district (2018–present)

==== Eliminated in primary ====
- Toni Brown, general contractor
- Yumeka Brown, Metropolitan Water Reclamation District of Greater Chicago commissioner (2022–present)
- Eric France, management consultant
- Jesse Jackson Jr., former U.S. representative (1995–2012)
- Patrick Keating, attorney
- Sidney Moore, non-profit founder, social worker, and candidate for Illinois Secretary of State in 2022
- Robert Peters, state senator from the 13th district (2019–present)
- Willie Preston, state senator from the 16th district (2023–present)
- Adal Regis, nonprofit executive

==== Declined ====
- Robin Kelly, incumbent U.S. representative (ran for U.S. Senate)

==== Endorsements ====
Endorsements in bold were made after the primary elections.

Yumeka Brown

State legislators

- Michael Hastings, state senator from the 19th district (2013–present)
- Debbie Meyers-Martin, state representative from the 38th district (2019–present)

Local officials

- Cam Davis, Metropolitan Water Reclamation District of Greater Chicago commissioner (2020–present)
- 6 other Metropolitan Water Reclamation District of Greater Chicago commissioners
Jesse Jackson Jr.

U.S. representatives

- Bobby Rush, former IL-01 (1993–2023)

Statewide officials

- James Meeks, former chair of the Illinois State Board of Education (2015–2019)

State legislators

- Will Davis, state representative from the 30th district (2003–present)

Local officials

- Roger Agpawa, mayor of Markham (2018–present)
- Kisha McCaskill, Cook County commissioner from the 5th district (2025–present)

Individuals

- Jacqueline Jackson, activist (candidate's mother)

Organizations

- Leading the Future
- March On PAC

Newspapers

- The Chicago Crusader
Donna Miller

Executive branch officials

- Carol Moseley Braun, former ambassador to New Zealand (1999–2001) and Samoa (2000–2001) and U.S. senator (1993–1999)

U.S. representatives

- Troy Carter, LA-06 (2021–present)
- Lois Frankel, FL-22 (2013–present)
- ~~Jan Schakowsky, IL-09 (1993–present)~~ (endorsement rescinded)
- Brad Schneider, IL-10 (2013–2015, 2017–present)
- Terri Sewell, AL-07 (2011–present)

State legislators

- Julie Hamos, former state representative from the 18th district (1998–2010)
- Karen May, former state representative from the 58th district (2001–2012)
- Carol Ronen, former state senator from the 7th district (2000–2008)
- William Marovitz, former state senator from the 3rd district (1981–1993)

Local officials

- Frank Aguilar, Cook County commissioner from the 16th district (2020–present)
- Scott Britton, Cook County commissioner from the 14th district (2018–present)
- John Daley, Cook County commissioner from the 11th district (1992–present)
- Bridget Degnen, Cook County commissioner from the 12th district (2018–present)
- Bridget Gainer, Cook County commissioner from the 10th district (2009–present)
- Lori Lightfoot, former mayor of Chicago (2019–2023)
- Stanley Moore, Cook County commissioner from the 4th district (2013–present)
- Michael Scott Jr., Cook County commissioner from the 2nd district (2024–present)
- Debra Silverstein, Chicago alder from the 50th ward (2011–present)
- Tara Stamps, Cook County commissioner from the 1st district (2023–present)
- Maggie Trevor, Cook County commissioner from the 9th district (2022–present)
- Anna Valencia, Chicago City Clerk (2017–present)

Individuals

- Ertharin Cousin, former executive director of the World Food Programme (2012–2017)

Labor unions

- **American Federation of Government Employees**

Organizations

- AIPAC
- Democratic Majority for Israel
- Divine Nine PAC
- Elect Democratic Women
- Giffords
- Joint Action Committee for Political Affairs (co-endorsement with Preston)
- Jewish Democratic Council of America

Newspapers

- Chicago Tribune
Robert Peters

U.S. senators

- Bernie Sanders, Vermont (2007–present) (Independent)
- Elizabeth Warren, Massachusetts (2013–present)

U.S. representatives

- Greg Casar, TX-35 (2023–present)
- Maxwell Frost, FL-10 (2023–present)
- Pramila Jayapal, WA-07 (2017–present)
- Ro Khanna, CA-17 (2017–present)
- Delia Ramirez, IL-03 (2023–present)
- Lateefah Simon, CA-12 (2025–present)

State legislators

- Christopher Belt, state senator from the 57th district (2019–present)
- Mattie Hunter, state senator from the 3rd district (2003–present)
- Adriane Johnson, state senator from the 30th district (2020–present)
- Abdelnasser Rashid, state representative from the 21st district (2023–present)
- Donne Trotter, former state senator from the 17th district (1993–2018)
- Doris Turner, state senator from the 48th district (2021–present)
- Maurice West, state representative from the 67th district (2019–present)

Local officials

- Anthony Beale, Chicago alder from the 9th ward (1999–present)
- Matt Martin, Chicago alder from the 47th ward (2019–present)
- Toni Preckwinkle, President of the Cook County Board of Commissioners (2010–present)
- Lamont Robinson, Chicago alder from the 4th ward (2023–present)
- Jeanette Taylor, Chicago alder from the 20th ward (2019–present)
- Desmon Yancy, Chicago alder from the 5th ward (2023–present)

Party officials

- David Hogg, former vice chair of the Democratic National Committee (2025)

Labor unions

- Amalgamated Transit Union
- Amalgamated Transit Union Local 241
- Amalgamated Transit Union Local 308
- Cook County College Teachers Union Local 1600
- International Association of Heat and Frost Insulators and Allied Workers Local 17
- International Association of Machinists and Aerospace Workers
- Iron Workers District Council
- International Union of Bricklayers and Allied Craftworkers Administrative District Council 1
- National Nurses United
- UNITE HERE Local 1
- United Food and Commercial Workers Local 881

Organizations

- Bend the Arc
- Christopher Street Project
- Citizen Action Illinois
- College Democrats of America
- Congressional Progressive Caucus PAC
- End Citizens United
- Food & Water Action
- IfNotNow
- Indivisible Chicago South Side
- J Street
- Jewish Council on Urban Affairs
- Jewish Voice for Peace Action
- Our Revolution
- Progressive Democrats of America
- Sierra Club Illinois
- Sunrise Movement
- Track AIPAC

Political parties

- Working Families Party
Willie Preston

State legislators

- Javier Cervantes, state senator from the 1st district (2022–present)
- ~~Lakesia Collins, state senator from the 5th district (2023–present)~~ (endorsement rescinded)
- Rachel Ventura, state senator from the 43rd district (2023–present)

Local officials

- Howard Brookins, former Chicago alder from the 21st ward (2003–2023)
- Monica Gordon, Cook County Clerk (2024–present)
- Gregory Mitchell, Chicago alder from the 7th ward (2015–present)

Individuals

- Willie Wilson, businessman

Labor unions

- Chicago Fire Fighters Union Local 2
- Chicago Fraternal Order of Police
- Illinois Fraternal Order of Police

Organizations

- Joint Action Committee for Political Affairs (co-endorsement with Miller)
Adal Regis

Executive branch officials

- David Axelrod, former Senior Advisor to the President (2009–2011)

Individuals

- Van Jones, political analyst
Declined to endorse

Local officials

- Bill Lowry, Cook County commissioner from the 3rd district (2018–present)

Individuals

- Larry Snelling, Chicago Police Superintendent (2023–present)

Labor unions

- Chicago Federation of Labor
- Illinois AFL-CIO
- Plumbers Local 130

Organizations

- Congressional Black Caucus PAC

==== Fundraising ====
Campaign finance reports as of February 25, 2026
Candidate	Raised	Spent	Cash on hand
Yumeka Brown (D)	$106,684	$62,660	$44,023
Eric France (D)	$22,079	$22,298	$0
Jesse Jackson Jr. (D)	$288,250	$239,393	$48,857
Patrick Keating (D)	$14,695	$9,733	$4,962
Donna Miller (D)	$1,971,084	$1,505,780	$465,304
Robert Peters (D)	$1,130,677	$942,167	$188,509
Willie Preston (D)	$138,048	$126,351	$11,697
Adal Regis (D) (Note: As last reported on December 31, 2025)	$71,090	$58,253	$806
Source: Federal Election Commission

==== Polling ====
Poll source	Date(s) administered	Sample size (Note: Key: A – all adults RV – registered voters LV – likely voters V – unclear)	Margin of error	Yumeka Brown	Jesse Jackson Jr.	Donna Miller	Robert Peters	Willie Preston	Other	Undecided
Global Strategy Group (D) (Note: This poll was sponsored by Miller's campaign)	December 1–3, 2025	400 (LV)	± 4.9%	9%	**24%**	9%	5%	6%	2% (Note: Keating with 2%)	**45%**
Lester & Associates (D) (Note: This poll was sponsored by Jackson's exploratory committee)	July 21–24, 2025	500 (LV)	–	11%	**21%**	10%	4%	3%	8% (Note: Regis with 5%; France with 3%)	**43%**

==== Results ====
Results by county: Miller—40–50% Miller—30–40%

Democratic primary results
Party	Candidate	Votes	%
**Democratic**	**Donna Miller**	**34,034**	**40.4**
Democratic	Jesse Jackson Jr.	24,321	28.9
Democratic	Robert Peters	10,490	12.4
Democratic	Yumeka Brown	8,534	10.1
Democratic	Willie Preston	2,463	2.9
Democratic	Patrick Keating	1,093	1.3
Democratic	Toni Brown	979	1.2
Democratic	Sidney Moore	860	1.0
Democratic	Eric France	837	1.0
Democratic	Adal Regis	685	0.8
Total votes		**84,296**	**100.0**

=== Republican primary ===
==== Nominee ====
- Michael Noack, truck driver

==== Results ====
Republican primary results
Party	Candidate	Votes	%
**Republican**	**Michael Noack**	**20,598**	**100.0**
Total votes		**20,598**	**100.0**

=== Independents and third-party candidates ===
==== Declared (did not qualify) ====
- Ashley Banks (Independent), photographer

=== General election ===
==== Predictions ====
Source	Ranking	As of
Decision Desk HQ	Safe D	July 14, 2026
The Cook Political Report	Solid D	February 6, 2025
Inside Elections	Solid D	December 5, 2025
Sabato's Crystal Ball	Safe D	July 15, 2025

==== Fundraising ====
Campaign finance reports as of April 25, 2026
Candidate	Raised	Spent	Cash on hand
Donna Miller (D)	$2,331,833	$2,262,109	$69,724
Michael Noack (R)	$0	$0	$0
Ashley Banks (R)	$0	$0	$0
Source: Federal Election Commission

==== Results ====
2026 Illinois 2nd congressional district election
Party	Candidate	Votes	%	±%
Democratic	Donna Miller			
Republican	Michael Noack			
Independent	Ashley Banks			
Total votes				

== District 3 ==
2026 Illinois's 3rd congressional district election
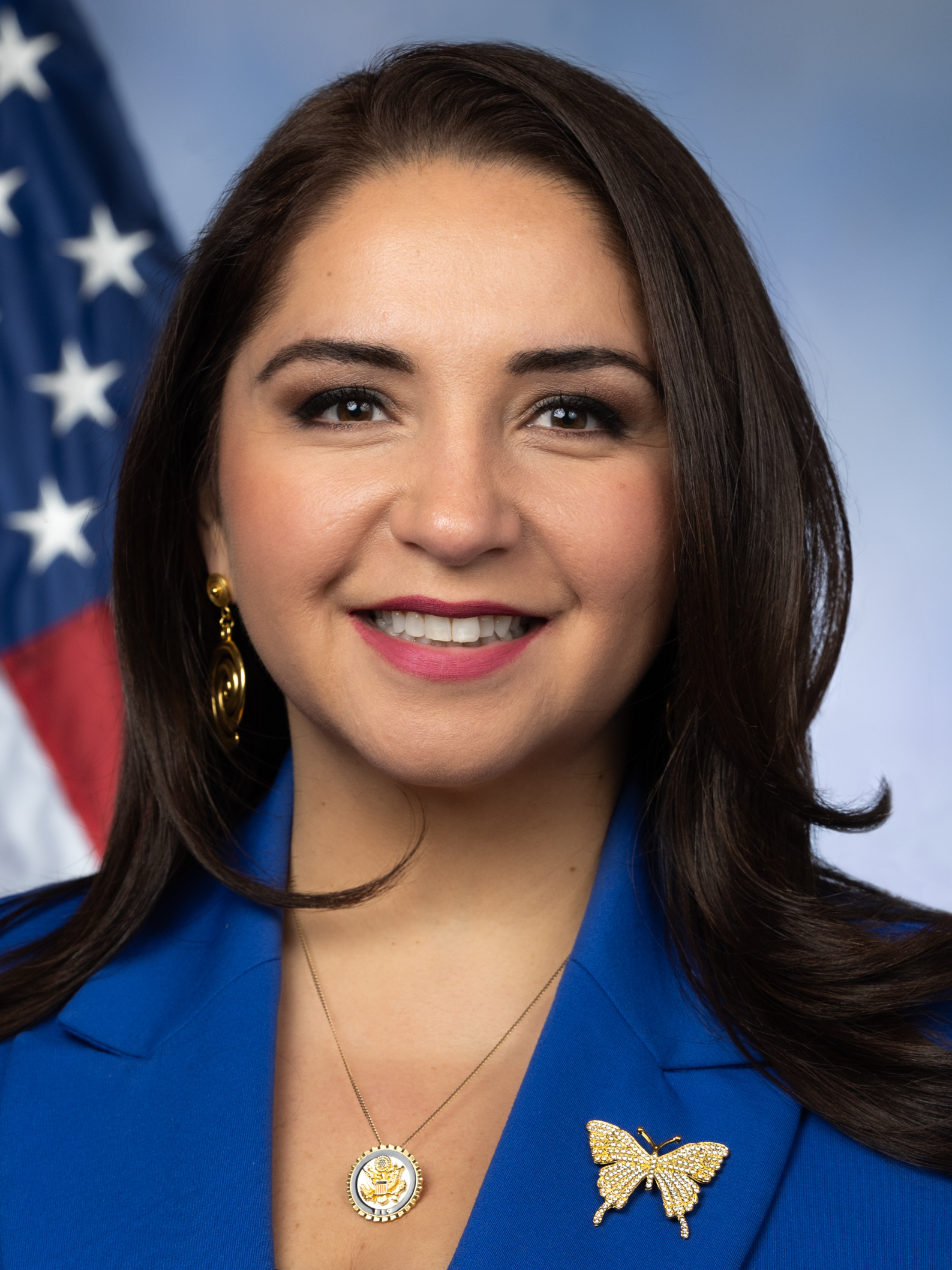

Nominee	Delia Ramirez	Angel Oakley
Party	Democratic	Republican
- Ramirez: 60–70% 80–90%
Incumbent U.S. Representative
Delia Ramirez
Democratic

The 3rd district is based in northwestern Chicago, including the neighborhoods of Albany Park, Belmont Cragin, Dunning, Humboldt Park, Irving Park, Logan Square, Montclare, Portage Park, and West Town. It also includes parts of the DuPage County suburbs, taking in all or parts of Addison, Bartlett, Bensenville, Elgin, Elk Grove Village, Elmwood Park, Franklin Park, Glendale Heights, Hanover Park, River Grove, Wayne, West Chicago, Wheaton, and Wood Dale. The incumbent is Democrat Delia Ramirez, who was elected with 67.3% of the vote in 2024.

=== Democratic primary ===
==== Nominee ====
- Delia Ramirez, incumbent U.S. representative

==== Endorsements ====
Endorsements in bold were made after the primary elections.

Delia Ramirez

Labor unions

- American Federation of Government Employees
- Chicago Federation of Labor
- Chicago Teachers Union
- Illinois AFL-CIO
- International Union of Operating Engineers Locals 150 and 399
- Plumbers Local 130
- SEIU Healthcare
- SEIU Illinois State Council

Organizations

- Center for Freethought Equality PAC
- End Citizens United
- **Giffords**
- J Street
- Justice Democrats
- Our Revolution
- PAL PAC
- Planned Parenthood Action Fund
- Progressive Democrats of America
- Track AIPAC

==== Fundraising ====
Campaign finance reports as of February 25, 2026
Candidate	Raised	Spent	Cash on hand
Delia Ramirez (D)	$1,200,156	$717,982	$949,745
Source: Federal Election Commission

==== Results ====
Democratic primary results
Party	Candidate	Votes	%
**Democratic**	**Delia Ramirez (incumbent)**	**72,443**	**100.0**
Total votes		**72,443**	**100.0**

=== Republican primary ===
==== Nominee ====
- Angel Oakley, cannabis business consultant and write-in candidate for this district in 2024

==== Results ====
Republican primary results
Party	Candidate	Votes	%
**Republican**	**Angel Oakley**	**13,991**	**100.0**
Total votes		**13,991**	**100.0**

=== General election ===
==== Predictions ====
Source	Ranking	As of
Decision Desk HQ	Safe D	July 14, 2026
The Cook Political Report	Solid D	February 6, 2025
Inside Elections	Solid D	December 5, 2025
Sabato's Crystal Ball	Safe D	July 15, 2025

==== Fundraising ====
Campaign finance reports as of April 25, 2026
Candidate	Raised	Spent	Cash on hand
Delia Ramirez (D)	$1,296,911	$783,478	$971,005
Angel Oakley (R)	$5,039	$1,657	$3,382
Source: Federal Election Commission

==== Results ====
2026 Illinois 3rd congressional district election
Party	Candidate	Votes	%	±%
Democratic	Delia Ramirez (Incumbent)			
Republican	Angel Oakley			
Total votes				

== District 4 ==
2026 Illinois's 4th congressional district election
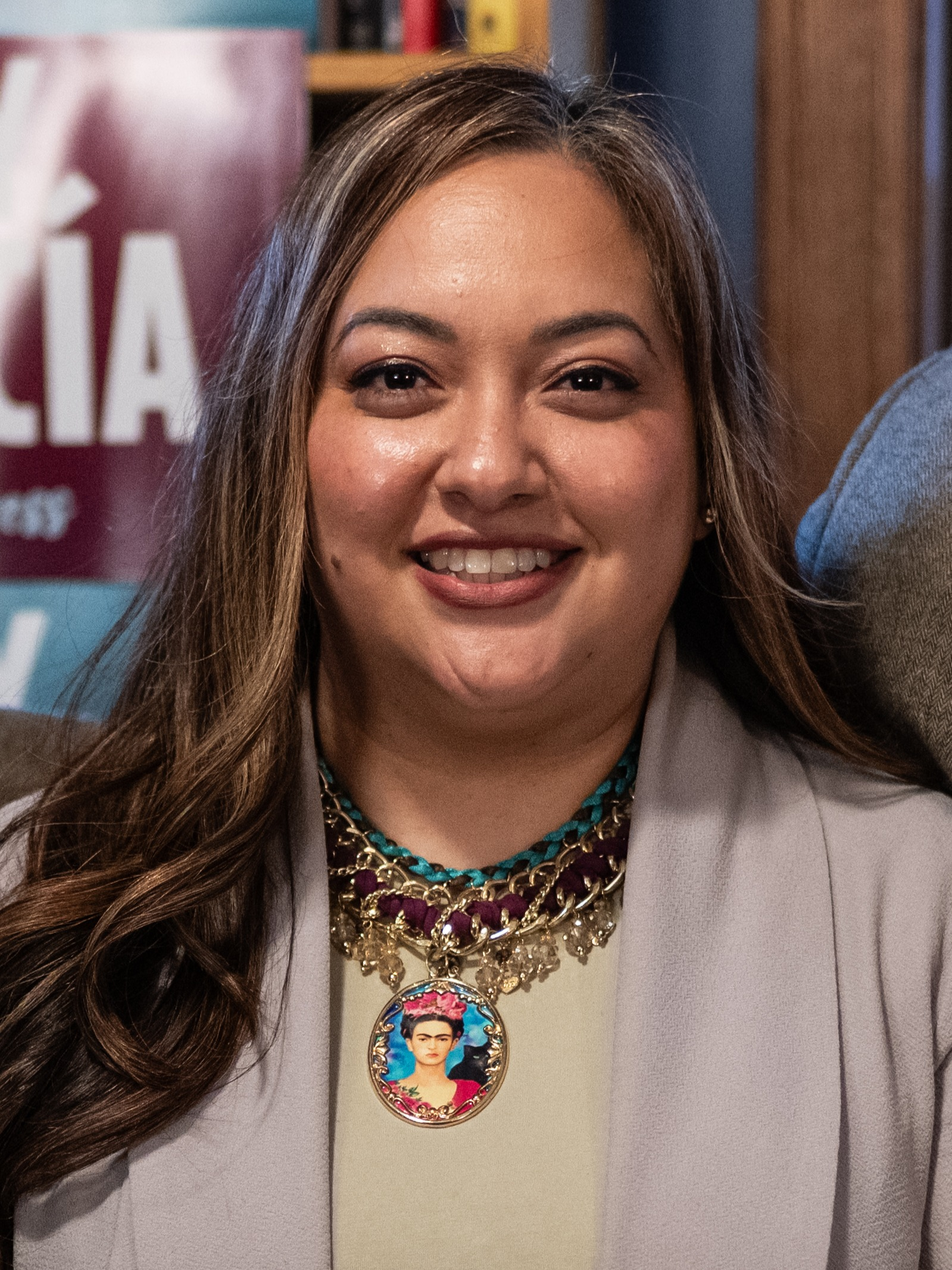

Nominee	Patty Garcia	Lupe Castillo	Chris Getty
Party	Democratic	Republican	Independent
Popular vote	113,041	25,531	14,718
Percentage	71.1%	16.1%	9.3%
- Garcia: 50–60% 70–80%
U.S. Representative before election
Chuy García
Democratic
Elected U.S. Representative
Patty García
Democratic

The 4th district is based in southwest Chicago, including Ashburn, Brighton Park, Clearing, Gage Park, Garfield Ridge, South Lawndale, West Elsdon, and West Lawn, and in the western Chicago suburbs, including Cicero and Berwyn. The incumbent is retiring-Democrat Chuy García, who was last elected with 67.5% of the vote.

=== Democratic primary ===
Incumbent Chuy García, initially filed to run for another term but withdrew his nomination after the deadline to file a nomination passed. This left only one candidate on the Democratic primary ballot; his Chief of Staff, Patty Garcia (no relation). García said he was retiring for health reasons after consulting his doctor, and his wife asking him to retire. Democratic strategist David Axelrod, slammed García's move as Chicago-style "machine tactics" and "election denial of another kind." Democratic representative Marie Gluesenkamp Perez of Washington introduced a motion of disapproval against García for the alleged scheme. House Democratic Leader Hakeem Jeffries urged members to oppose the rebuke, calling García "a progressive champion" and "a good man". The motion passed 238-186 with mostly Republican votes.

Several Democrats ran as independents in response to García's actions, though only Chris Getty made the ballot.

==== Nominee ====
- Patty Garcia, chief of staff of incumbent Chuy García

==== Withdrawn ====
- Chuy García, incumbent U.S. representative

==== Endorsements ====
Patty Garcia

U.S. representatives

- Chuy García, IL-04 (2019–present)
- Delia Ramirez, IL-03 (2023–present)

Statewide officials

- Alexi Giannoulias, secretary of state of Illinois (2023–present)

State legislators

- Don Harmon, president of the Illinois Senate (2020–present) from the 39th district (2003–present)
- Chris Welch, speaker of the Illinois House of Representatives (2021–present) from the 7th district (2013–present)

Labor unions

- Air Line Pilots Association, International
- Amalgamated Transit Union
- Brotherhood of Locomotive Engineers and Trainmen
- Brotherhood of Maintenance of Way Employes
- Brotherhood of Railroad Signalmen
- Chicago Federation of Labor
- Illinois AFL-CIO
- International Association of Machinists and Aerospace Workers
- International Union of Operating Engineers Locals 150 and 399
- Laborers' Local 4
- Mid-America Carpenters Regional Council
- National Nurses United
- Plumbers Local 130
- SEIU Healthcare
- SMART Transportation Division
- Teamsters Joint Council 25

Organizations

- Citizen Action Illinois
- Our Revolution
- Track AIPAC
Chuy García (declined)

Organizations

- Track AIPAC

==== Fundraising ====
Campaign finance reports as of February 25, 2026
Candidate	Raised	Spent	Cash on hand
Patty Garcia (D)	$192,292	$30,206	$162,086
Source: Federal Election Commission

==== Results ====
Democratic primary results
Party	Candidate	Votes	%
Democratic	Patty Garcia	52,616	100.0
Total votes		52,616	100.0

=== Republican primary ===
==== Nominee ====
- Lupe Castillo, pharmacy technician and candidate for this district in 2024

==== Results ====
Republican primary results
Party	Candidate	Votes	%
Republican	Lupe Castillo	8,336	100.0
Total votes		8,336	100.0

=== Independents and third-party candidates ===
==== Declared ====
- Chris Getty (Independent (Note: Getty is a registered Democrat, but is running as an independent.)), mayor of Lyons
- Ed Hershey (Working Class Party), high school teacher and nominee for this district in 2022 and 2024

==== Failed to qualify ====
- Lindsay Church (Independent), nonprofit executive
- Mayra Macías (Independent (Note: Macías is a registered Democrat, but is running as an independent.)), former executive director of the Latino Victory Project
- Byron Sigcho-Lopez (Independent (Note: Sigcho-Lopez is a registered Democrat, but is running as an independent.)), Chicago alder from the 25th ward (2019–present)

==== Endorsements ====
Chris Getty

Local officials

- Raymond Lopez, Chicago alder (2015–present)

Individuals

- Garry McCarthy, Chicago Police Superintendent (2011-2015)
- Krist Novoselic, rock musician
Byron Sigcho-Lopez (disqualified)

Organizations

- Chicago Democratic Socialists of America

=== General election ===
==== Predictions ====
Source	Ranking	As of
Decision Desk HQ	Safe D	July 14, 2026
The Cook Political Report	Solid D	February 6, 2025
Inside Elections	Solid D	December 5, 2025
Sabato's Crystal Ball	Safe D	July 15, 2025

==== Fundraising ====
Campaign finance reports as of April 25, 2026
Candidate	Raised	Spent	Cash on hand
Patty Garcia (D)	$270,042	$74,690	$195,352
Lupe Castillo (R)	$0	$0	$0
Ed Hershey (WCP)	$0	$0	$0
Lindsay Church (I)	$0	$0	$0
Chris Getty (I)	$0	$0	$0
Mayra Macías (I)	$227,698	$68,571	$159,126
Byron Sigcho-Lopez (I)	$148,519	$43,945	$104,574
Source: Federal Election Commission

==== Post-primary endorsements ====
Patty Garcia (D)

U.S. representatives

- Greg Casar, TX-35 (2023–present)
- Maxwell Frost, FL-10 (2023–present)
- Pramila Jayapal, WA-07 (2017–present)

Organizations

- Congressional Progressive Caucus PAC
- Progressive Democrats of America
Mayra Macías (I) (disqualified)

U.S. representatives

- Nydia Velázquez, NY-07 (1993–present) (Democratic)

Organizations

- End Citizens United
- Planned Parenthood Action Fund
Byron Sigcho-Lopez (I) (disqualified)

Organizations

- Chicago Democratic Socialists of America
- Party for Socialism and Liberation Chicago

==== Forum ====
2026 Illinois' 4th congressional district candidate forum
No.	Date	Host	Moderator	Link	Democratic	Republican	Working Class	Independent	Independent	Independent	Independent
Key: P Participant A Absent N Not invited I Invited W Withdrawn											
Key: P Participant A Absent N Not invited I Invited W Withdrawn					Patty Garcia	Lupe Castillo	Ed Hershey	Lindsay Church	Chris Getty	Mayra Macias	Byron Sigcho-Lopez
1	Apr. 29, 2026	University of Illinois Chicago; College Democrats at UIC; College Democrats of Illinois	James Beatley; Roberto Gomez-Valadez		N	N	P	P	P	P	P
2	Sep. 29, 2026	FOX 32 Chicago	Anita Blanton		P	P	P	W	P	W	W

==== Polling ====
Poll source	Date(s) administered	Sample size	Margin of error	Lupe Castillo (R)	Patty Garcia (D)	Chris Getty (I)	Ed Hershey (WCP)	Other	Undecided
Independent Center Voice (Note: Poll sponsored by the Bullfinch Group)	July 31 – August 1, 2026	653 (RV)	± 3.8%	15%	34%	9%	4%	1% (Note: "I would not vote" with 1%)	37%

==== Results ====
2026 Illinois 4th congressional district election
Party	Candidate	Votes	%	±%
Democratic	Patty Garcia			
Republican	Lupe Castillo			
Working Class	Ed Hershey			
Independent	Chris Getty			
Independent	Lindsay Church			
Total votes				

== District 5 ==
2026 Illinois's 5th congressional district election
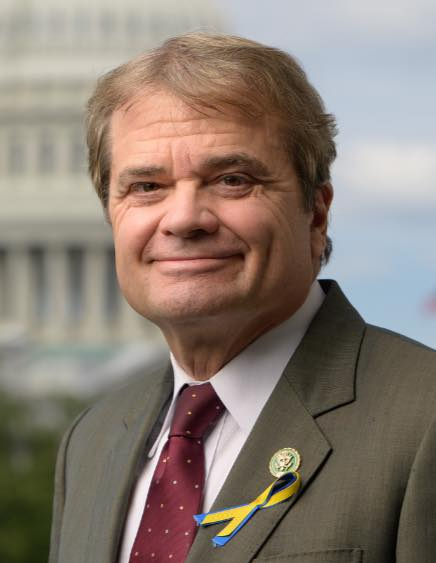

Nominee	Mike Quigley	Tommy Hanson
Party	Democratic	Republican
- Quigley: 50–60% 70–80%
Incumbent U.S. Representative
Mike Quigley
Democratic

The 5th district includes portions of northern Chicago, including Albany Park, Forest Glen, Lake View, Lincoln Park, Lincoln Square, Norwood Park, North Center, North Park, O'Hare, and West Ridge. It also takes in the northwest Chicago suburbs, including Arlington Heights and Palatine. The incumbent is Democrat Mike Quigley, who was re-elected with 69.0% of the vote in 2024.

=== Democratic primary ===
==== Nominee ====
- Mike Quigley, incumbent U.S. representative

==== Eliminated in primary ====
- Matt Conroy, learning and development specialist
- Ellen Corley, marketing consultant and former teacher
- Anthony Tamez, member of the Chicago Community Commission for Public Safety and Accountability (2023–present)

==== Withdrawn ====
- Jonny Bishop, high school teacher and candidate for this district in 2024

==== Endorsements ====
Matt Conroy

Organizations

- Progressive Victory
- Track AIPAC
Mike Quigley

Labor unions

- American Federation of Government Employees
- Chicago Federation of Labor
- Illinois AFL-CIO
- International Union of Operating Engineers Locals 150 and 399
- Plumbers Local 130
- SEIU Healthcare
- SEIU Illinois State Council

Organizations

- AIPAC
- Humane World Action Fund
- Joint Action Committee for Political Affairs
- J Street PAC
- Planned Parenthood Action Fund
- Population Connection

Newspapers

- Chicago Tribune
Declined to endorse

Labor unions

- Cook County College Teachers Union Local 1600

==== Fundraising ====
Campaign finance reports as of February 25, 2026
Candidate	Raised	Spent	Cash on hand
Mike Quigley (D)	$540,562	$499,809	$1,221,936
Source: Federal Election Commission

==== Results ====
Democratic primary results
Party	Candidate	Votes	%
Democratic	Mike Quigley (incumbent)	75,319	64.8
Democratic	Matt Conroy	28,988	24.9
Democratic	Ellen Corley	8,537	7.3
Democratic	Anthony Tamez	3,344	2.9
Total votes		116,188	100.0

=== Republican primary ===
==== Nominee ====
- Tommy Hanson, real estate broker and perennial candidate

==== Eliminated in primary ====
- Kimball Ladien, psychiatrist and perennial candidate
- Barry Wicker, commodities broker

==== Endorsements ====
Declined to endorse

Newspapers

- Chicago Tribune

=== Results ===
Republican primary results
Party	Candidate	Votes	%
Republican	Tommy Hanson	11,921	72.0
Republican	Barry Wicker	2,781	16.8
Republican	Kimball Ladien	1,864	11.3
Total votes		16,566	100.0

=== Independents ===
==== Formed exploratory committee ====
- Steve Schwartzberg, church business manager and Democratic candidate for this district in 2018

=== General election ===
==== Predictions ====
Source	Ranking	As of
Decision Desk HQ	Safe D	July 14, 2026
The Cook Political Report	Solid D	February 6, 2025
Inside Elections	Solid D	December 5, 2025
Sabato's Crystal Ball	Safe D	July 15, 2025

==== Fundraising ====
Campaign finance reports as of April 25, 2026
Candidate	Raised	Spent	Cash on hand
Mike Quigley (D)	$621,679	$584,763	$1,218,099
Tommy Hanson (R)	$0	$0	$0
Source: Federal Election Commission

==== Results ====
2026 Illinois 5th congressional district election
Party	Candidate	Votes	%	±%
Democratic	Mike Quigley (Incumbent)			
Republican	Tommy Hanson			
Total votes				

== District 6 ==
2026 Illinois's 6th congressional district election

Nominee	Sean Casten	Niki Conforti
Party	Democratic	Republican
- Casten: 60–70%
Incumbent U.S. Representative
Sean Casten
Democratic

The 6th district is based in the southwest Chicago suburbs, including Oak Lawn and Downers Grove, as well as parts of the eastern DuPage County suburbs. The incumbent is Democrat Sean Casten, who was re-elected with 54.2% of the vote in 2024. The 2026 election will be a rematch of the 2024 election.

=== Democratic primary ===
==== Nominee ====
- Sean Casten, incumbent U.S. representative

==== Eliminated in primary ====
- Joey Ruzevich, software engineer

==== Endorsements ====
Endorsements in bold were made after the primary elections.

Sean Casten

Labor unions

- American Federation of Government Employees
- Chicago Federation of Labor
- Cook County College Teachers Union Local 1600
- Illinois AFL-CIO
- International Union of Operating Engineers Locals 150 and 399
- Illinois Federation of Teachers
- Plumbers Local 130
- SEIU Healthcare
- SEIU Illinois State Council

Organizations

- 314 Action
- Citizen Action Illinois
- **Giffords**
- Humane World Action Fund
- Jewish Democratic Council of America
- Joint Action Committee for Political Affairs
- J Street
- League of Conservation Voters Action Fund
- Planned Parenthood Action Fund
- Sierra Club

Newspapers

- Chicago Tribune (Democratic primary only)
- Daily Herald
Joey Ruzevich

U.S. representatives

- Marie Newman, former IL-03 (2021–2023)

Labor unions

- National Association of Letter Carriers Branch 4016

Organizations

- Peace Action
- Track AIPAC
- West Suburban Illinois Democratic Socialists of America

==== Fundraising ====
Campaign finance reports as of February 25, 2026
Candidate	Raised	Spent	Cash on hand
Sean Casten (D)	$1,585,448	$1,085,985	$1,193,605
Joey Ruzevich (D)	$168,973	$108,899	$0
Source: Federal Election Commission

==== Results ====
Democratic primary results
Party	Candidate	Votes	%
**Democratic**	**Sean Casten (incumbent)**	**69,579**	**75.8**
Democratic	Joey Ruzevich	22,181	24.2
Total votes		**91,760**	**100.0**

=== Republican primary ===
==== Nominee ====
- Niki Conforti, energy consultant and nominee for this district in 2024 and candidate in 2022

==== Eliminated in primary ====
- Skylar Duensing, political activist

==== Endorsements ====
Endorsements in bold were made after the primary elections.

Niki Conforti

Organizations

- **Maggie's List**

Newspapers

- Chicago Tribune (Republican primary only)
- Daily Herald

==== Fundraising ====
Campaign finance reports as of February 25, 2026
Candidate	Raised	Spent	Cash on hand
Niki Conforti (R)	$253,222	$222,212	$36,212
Skylar Duensing (R)	$8,939	$7,800	$1,139
Source: Federal Election Commission

==== Results ====
Republican primary results
Party	Candidate	Votes	%
**Republican**	**Niki Conforti**	**26,783**	**82.2**
Republican	Skylar Duensing	5,791	17.8
Total votes		**32,574**	**100.0**

=== General election ===
==== Predictions ====
Source	Ranking	As of
Decision Desk HQ	Safe D	September 25, 2026
The Cook Political Report	Solid D	February 6, 2025
Inside Elections	Solid D	December 5, 2025
Sabato's Crystal Ball	Safe D	July 15, 2025

==== Fundraising ====
Campaign finance reports as of April 25, 2026
Candidate	Raised	Spent	Cash on hand
Sean Casten (D)	$1,794,624	$1,307,540	$1,181,227
Niki Conforti (R)	$274,391	$246,162	$31,168
Source: Federal Election Commission

==== Results ====
2026 Illinois 6th congressional district election
Party	Candidate	Votes	%	±%
Democratic	Sean Casten (Incumbent)			
Republican	Niki Conforti			
Total votes				

== District 7 ==
2026 Illinois's 7th congressional district election
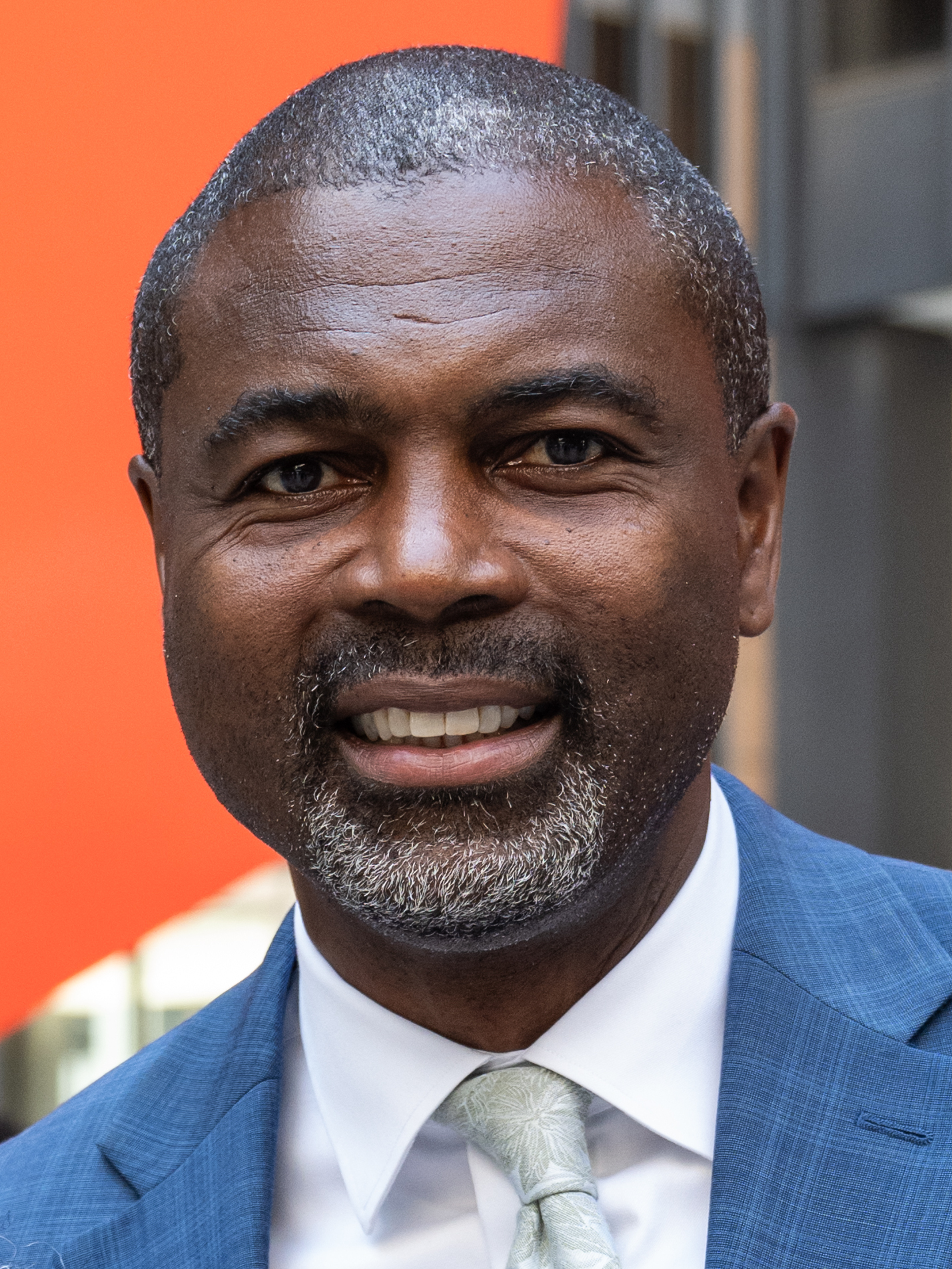

Nominee	La Shawn Ford	Chad Koppie
Party	Democratic	Republican
- Ford: 80–90%
Incumbent U.S. Representative
Danny Davis
Democratic

The 7th district is based in the West Side and downtown of Chicago, including Austin, East Garfield Park, the Loop, the Near North Side, the Near South Side, the Near West Side, North Lawndale, West Garfield Park, and West Town. It also takes in the villages of Oak Park and Maywood. The incumbent is Democrat Danny Davis, who was re-elected with 83.3% of the vote in 2024, however did not run for re-election in 2026.

=== Democratic primary ===
==== Nominee ====
- La Shawn Ford, state representative from the 8th district (2007–present) and candidate for mayor of Chicago in 2019

==== Eliminated in primary ====
- Richard Boykin, former Cook County commissioner from the 1st district (2014–2018), candidate for Cook County Circuit Court Clerk in 2020, and candidate for County Commission president in 2022
- Kina Collins, political organizer and candidate for this district in 2020, 2022, and 2024
- Melissa Conyears Ervin, Chicago City Treasurer (2019–present) and candidate for this district in 2024
- Anthony Driver Jr., executive director of the SEIU Illinois State Council, president of the Chicago Community Commission for Public Safety and Accountability, and candidate for Chicago's 20th ward in 2019
- David Ehrlich
- Thomas Fisher, emergency physician
- Jason Friedman, development executive
- Rory Hoskins, mayor of Forest Park
- Anabel Mendoza, immigration advocate
- Jazmin Robinson, HR professional
- Reed Showalter, antitrust attorney
- Felix Tello, business consultant

==== Withdrawn ====
- Danica Leigh, healthcare worker
- John McCombs, standup comedian (endorsed Collins)

==== Declined ====
- Kam Buckner, speaker pro tempore of the Illinois House of Representatives (2025–present) from the 26th district (2019–present) and candidate for mayor of Chicago in 2023 (running for re-election, endorsed Ford)
- Walter Burnett Jr., former vice mayor of Chicago (2023–2025) and alder from the 27th ward (1995–2025) (endorsed Ford)
- Danny Davis, incumbent U.S. Representative (endorsed Ford)

==== Endorsements ====
Endorsements in bold were made after the primary elections.

Richard Boykin

State legislators

- William Marovitz, former state senator from the 3rd district (1981–1993)

Local officials

- Raymond Lopez, Chicago alder from the 15th ward (2015–present)
- Maria Pappas, Cook County Treasurer (1998–present)
- Silvana Tabares, Chicago alder from the 23rd ward (2018–present)

Individuals

- Paul Vallas, former CEO of Chicago Public Schools (1995–2001)
- Willie Wilson, businessman

Organizations

- J Street PAC (co-endorsement with Fisher, Ford, and Friedman)
- National Baptist Convention, USA

Newspapers

- The Chicago Crusader
Kina Collins

U.S. representatives

- Marie Newman, former IL-03 (2021–2023)

Individuals

- John McCombs, standup comedian and former candidate for this district

Organizations

- Peace Action
- Track AIPAC (co-endorsement with Mendoza and Showalter)
- College Democrats at UIC
Anthony Driver Jr.

U.S. representatives

- Greg Casar, TX-35 (2023–present)
- Maxwell Frost, FL-10 (2023–present)
- Chuy García, IL-04 (2019–present)
- Pramila Jayapal, WA-07 (2017–present)
- Delia Ramirez, IL-03 (2023–present)

State legislators

- Lakesia Collins, state senator from the 5th district (2023–present)

Labor unions

- Chicago Laborers' District Council
- International Association of Machinists and Aerospace Workers
- International Brotherhood of Electrical Workers Local 134
- Mid-America Carpenters Regional Council
- SEIU Healthcare
- SEIU Illinois State Council (candidate's employer)

Organizations

- Collective PAC
- Congressional Progressive Caucus PAC
- Our Revolution
- Sierra Club
Melissa Conyears Ervin

U.S. representatives

- Lois Frankel, FL-22 (2013–present)

Local officials

- Stephanie Coleman, Chicago alder from the 16th ward (2019–present)
- Lori Lightfoot, former mayor of Chicago (2019–2023)
- Bill Lowry, Cook County commissioner from the 3rd district (2018–present)
- David Moore, Chicago alder from the 17th ward (2015–present)
- Monique Scott, Chicago alder from the 24th ward (2022–present)
- Chris Taliaferro, Chicago alder from the 29th ward (2015–present)
- Anna Valencia, Chicago City Clerk (2017–present)
- William Hall, Chicago alder from the 6th ward (2022–present)

Labor unions

- Chicago Fire Fighters Union Local 2
- Chicago Teachers Union
- Illinois Federation of Teachers

Organizations

- AIPAC
- Elect Democratic Women
- Joint Action Committee for Political Affairs (co-endorsement with Friedman)
Thomas Fisher

U.S. representatives

- Ami Bera, CA-06 (2013–present)
- Herb Conaway, NJ-03 (2025–present)
- Ro Khanna, CA-17 (2017–present)
- Lauren Underwood, IL-14 (2019–present)

Individuals

- Martin Nesbitt, businessman

Organizations

- 314 Action
- American College of Physicians
- American Academy of Emergency Medicine
- J Street PAC (co-endorsement with Boykin, Ford, and Friedman)

Newspapers

- Chicago Tribune
La Shawn Ford

U.S. senators

- Roland Burris, Illinois (2009–2010)

U.S. representatives

- Danny Davis, IL-07 (1997–present)
- Bobby Rush, former IL-01 (1993–2023)

Statewide officials

- Pat Quinn, former Governor of Illinois (2009–2015)
- Jesse White, former Illinois Secretary of State (1999–2023)

State legislators

- Carol Ammons, state representative from the 103rd district (2015–present)
- Diane Blair-Sherlock, state representative from 46th district (2022–present)
- Kam Buckner, speaker pro tempore of the Illinois House of Representatives (2025–present) from the 26th district (2019–present)
- Michael Crawford, state representative from the 31st district (2025–present)
- Fred Crespo, state representative from the 44th district (2007–present)
- Lisa Davis, state representative from the 32nd district (2025–present)
- Anthony DeLuca, state representative from the 80th district (2009–present)
- Daniel Didech, state representative from the 59th district (2019–present)
- Robyn Gabel, Majority Leader of the Illinois House of Representatives (2023–present) from the 18th district (2010–present)
- Jehan Gordon-Booth, former speaker pro tempore of the Illinois House of Representatives (2021–2025) from the 92nd district (2009–present)
- Jay Hoffman, state representative from the 113th district (1991–1997, 1997–2011, 2013–present)
- Mattie Hunter, state senator from the 3rd district (2003–present)
- Emil Jones, former President of the Illinois Senate (2003–2009) from the 14th district (1983–2009)
- Thaddeus Jones, state representative from the 29th district (2011–present) and mayor of Calumet City (2021–present)
- Michael Kelly, state representative from the 15th district (2021–present)
- Kimberly Lightford, Majority Leader of the Illinois Senate (2019–present) from the 4th district (1998–present)
- Camille Lilly, state representative from the 78th district (2010–present)
- Natalie Manley, state representative from the 98th district (2013–present)
- Rita Mayfield, state representative from the 60th district (2010–present)
- Debbie Meyers-Martin, state representative from the 38th district (2019–present)
- Anna Moeller, state representative from the 43rd district (2014–present)
- Suzanne Ness, state representative from the 66th district (2021–present)
- Bob Rita, state representative from 28th district (2003–present)
- Justin Slaughter, state representative from the 27th district (2017–present)
- Nicholas Smith, state representative from the 34th district (2018–present)
- Chris Welch, Speaker of the Illinois House of Representatives (2021–present) from the 7th district (2013–present)
- Maurice West, state representative from the 67th district (2019–present)
- Jawaharial Williams, state representative from the 10th district (2019–present)

Local officials

- Walter Burnett Jr., former vice mayor of Chicago (2023–2025) and alder from the 27th ward (1995–2025)
- Derrick Curtis, Chicago alder from the 18th ward (2015–present)
- Emma Mitts, Chicago alder from the 37th ward (2000–present)

Labor unions

- **American Federation of Government Employees**
- Cook County College Teachers Union Local 1600
- Chicago Fraternal Order of Police
- Illinois Fraternal Order of Police

Organizations

- **Giffords**
- J Street (co-endorsement with Boykin, Fisher, and Friedman)
Jason Friedman

Local officials

- Brian Hopkins, Chicago alder from the 2nd ward (2015–present)

Organizations

- J Street PAC (co-endorsement with Boykin and Ford)
- Joint Action Committee for Political Affairs(co-endorsement with Conyears Ervin)
Anabel Mendoza

Organizations

- Gen-Z for Change
- Track AIPAC (co-endorsement with Collins and Showalter)
Reed Showalter

Executive branch officials

- Jonathan Kanter, former U.S. Assistant Attorney General for the Antitrust Division (2021–2024)

Individuals

- Qasim Rashid, attorney

Organizations

- Center for Freethought Equality PAC
- Independent Voters of Illinois-Independent Precinct Organization
- Track AIPAC (co-endorsement with Collins and Mendoza)
Danny Davis (declined)

State legislators

- Rickey Hendon, former state senator from the 5th district (1993–2011)
Declined to endorse

Labor unions

- Chicago Federation of Labor
- Illinois AFL-CIO
- Plumbers Local 130

Organizations

- Congressional Black Caucus PAC
- Democratic Party of Oak Park

==== Fundraising ====
Italics indicate a withdrawn candidate.

Campaign finance reports as of February 25, 2026
Candidate	Raised	Spent	Cash on hand
Richard Boykin (D)	$383,261	$322,621	$60,640
Kina Collins (D)	$54,853	$52,440	$2,412
Melissa Conyears Ervin (D)	$620,821	$462,435	$167,119
Anthony Driver Jr. (D)	$224,180	$203,557	$20,623
David Ehrlich (D)	$8,213	$7,843	$369
Thomas Fisher (D)	$799,662	$538,789	$260,872
La Shawn Ford (D)	$494,774	$355,660	$139,113
Jason Friedman (D)	$2,507,058	$2,121,254	$385,804
Rory Hoskins (D)	$200,084	$184,443	$15,641
Danica Leigh (D)	$9,830	$9,830	$0
John McCombs (D)	$9,315	$9,315	$0
Anabel Mendoza (D)	$228,238	$149,087	$79,150
Jazmin Robinson (D) (Note: As last reported on December 31, 2025)	$21,214	$16,315	$4,899
Reed Showalter (D)	$331,528	$271,085	$60,443
Felix Tello (D) (Note: As last reported on September 30, 2025)	$8,410	$1,897	$6,512
Source: Federal Election Commission

==== Forum ====
2026 Illinois' 7th congressional district Democratic primary candidate forum
No.	Date	Host	Moderator	Link	Democratic	Democratic	Democratic	Democratic	Democratic	Democratic	Democratic	Democratic	Democratic	Democratic	Democratic	Democratic	Democratic
Key: P Participant A Absent N Not invited I Invited W Withdrawn																	
Key: P Participant A Absent N Not invited I Invited W Withdrawn					Richard Boykin	Kina Collins	Melissa Conyears-Ervin	Anthony Driver	Dave Ehrlich	Thomas Fisher	Jason Friedman	La Shawn Ford	Rory Hoskins	Anabel Mendoza	Jazmin Robinson	Reed Showalter	Felix Tello
1	Feb. 20, 2026	University of Illinois Chicago; College Democrats at UIC; College Democrats of Illinois; Young Democrats of Illinois; Cook County Young Democrats; Cook County Latino Democrats; Young Democrats of Chicago	Roberto Gomez-Valadez; Dominic Maino		**P**	**P**	**P**	**P**	**P**	**P**	**I**	**P**	**P**	**P**	**P**	**P**	**P**

==== Polling ====
Poll source	Date(s) administered	Sample size	Margin of error	Richard Boykin	Kina Collins	Melissa Conyears–Ervin	Thomas Fisher	La Shawn Ford	Jason Friedman	Other	Undecided
Upswing Research (D) (Note: Poll sponsored by Fisher's campaign)	January 7–10, 2026	401 (LV)	± 4.9%	4%	12%	15%	4%	**23%**	10%	13% (Note: "Someone else" with 11%; Showalter and Driver Jr. with 1%)	18%

==== Results ====
Democratic primary results
Party	Candidate	Votes	%
**Democratic**	**La Shawn Ford**	**24,408**	**23.7**
Democratic	Melissa Conyears Ervin	21,120	20.5
Democratic	Anthony Driver Jr.	11,943	11.6
Democratic	Kina Collins	9,735	9.5
Democratic	Thomas Fisher	7,865	7.6
Democratic	Jason Friedman	7,559	7.3
Democratic	Anabel Mendoza	5,610	5.5
Democratic	Reed Showalter	4,620	4.5
Democratic	Richard Boykin	4,173	4.1
Democratic	Jazmin Robinson	2,760	2.7
Democratic	Rory Hoskins	1,990	1.9
Democratic	David Ehrlich	756	0.7
Democratic	Felix Tello	355	0.3
Total votes		**102,894**	**100.0**

=== Republican primary ===
==== Nominee ====
- Chad Koppie, member of Kane County Regional Board of Schools and perennial candidate

==== Eliminated in primary ====
- Patricia Easley, investment advisor

==== Endorsements ====
Declined to endorse

Newspapers

- Chicago Tribune

==== Results ====
Republican primary results
Party	Candidate	Votes	%
**Republican**	**Chad Koppie**	**3,416**	**65.0**
Republican	Patricia Easley	1,843	35.0
Total votes		**5,259**	**100.0**

=== Independents ===
==== Filed paperwork ====
- Nathan Billips
- Anita Rao, physician
- Emelia Rosie Washington Soviegn

=== General election ===
==== Predictions ====
Source	Ranking	As of
Decision Desk HQ	Safe D	July 14, 2026
The Cook Political Report	Solid D	February 6, 2025
Inside Elections	Solid D	December 5, 2025
Sabato's Crystal Ball	Safe D	July 15, 2025

==== Fundraising ====
Campaign finance reports as of April 25, 2026
Candidate	Raised	Spent	Cash on hand
La Shawn Ford (D)	$653,462	$567,052	$86,410
Chad Koppie (R)	$0	$0	$0
Source: Federal Election Commission

==== Results ====
2026 Illinois 7th congressional district election
Party	Candidate	Votes	%	±%
Democratic	La Shawn Ford			
Republican	Chad Koppie			
Total votes				

== District 8 ==
2026 Illinois's 8th congressional district election
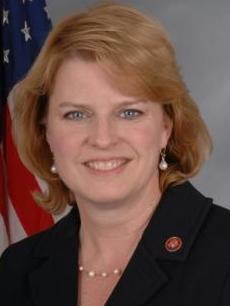

Nominee	Melissa Bean	Jennifer Davis
Party	Democratic	Republican
- Bean: 60–70%
Incumbent U.S. Representative
Raja Krishnamoorthi
Democratic

The 8th district is based in the western outer suburbs of Chicago, including Elgin, Schaumburg, and Des Plaines. The incumbent is Democrat Raja Krishnamoorthi, who was re-elected with 57.1% of the vote in 2024. Krishnamoorthi did not seek re-election, instead running unsuccessfully for the U.S. Senate in 2026.

=== Democratic primary ===
==== Nominee ====
- Melissa Bean, former U.S. representative (2005–2011)

==== Eliminated in primary ====
- Junaid Ahmed, tech consultant and candidate for this district in 2022
- Yasmeen Bankole, Hanover Park trustee
- Sanjyot Dunung, former member of the UNICEF USA Board of Directors
- Neil Khot, small business owner
- Kevin Morrison, Cook County commissioner from the 15th district (2018–present)
- Dan Tully, attorney and former legal advisor at the U.S. Department of Commerce
- Ryan Vetticad, former U.S. Department of Justice National Security Division employee

==== Withdrawn ====
- Christ Kallas, branding expert (endorsed Ahmed)

==== Declined ====
- Raja Krishnamoorthi, incumbent U.S. representative (ran for U.S. Senate)
- Anna Moeller, state representative from the 43rd district (2014–present) (running for re-election, endorsed Bankole)
- Cristina Castro, state senator from the 22nd district (2017–present) (running for re-election, endorsed Ahmed)

==== Endorsements ====
Endorsements in bold were made after the primary elections.

Junaid Ahmed

U.S. senators

- Bernie Sanders, Vermont (2007–present) (Independent)
- Elizabeth Warren, Massachusetts (2013–present)

U.S. representatives

- Jamaal Bowman, former NY-16 (2021–2025)
- Maxwell Frost, FL-10 (2023–present)
- Chuy García, IL-04 (2019–present)
- Pramila Jayapal, WA-07 (2017–present)
- Ro Khanna, CA-17 (2017–present)
- Alexandria Ocasio-Cortez, NY-14 (2019–present)
- Delia Ramirez, IL-03 (2023–present)

State legislators

- Cristina Castro, state senator from the 22nd district (2017–present)
- Rachel Ventura, state senator from the 43rd district (2023–present)

Individuals

- Christ Kallas, branding expert and former candidate for this district

Organizations

- Congressional Progressive Caucus PAC
- Emgage Action
- IfNotNow
- End Citizens United
- Justice Democrats
- Our Revolution
- Peace Action
- Progressive Democrats of America
- Sunrise Movement
- Track AIPAC
- West Suburban Illinois Democratic Socialists of America
- PAL PAC
Yasmeen Bankole

U.S. senators

- Dick Durbin, Illinois (1997–present)

U.S. representatives

- Bobby Rush, former IL-01 (1993–2023)

State legislators

- Anna Moeller, state representative from the 43rd district (2014–present)
- Diane Pappas, former state senator from the 23rd district (2022–2023)

Local officials

- Donna Miller, Cook County commissioner from the 6th district (2018–present)
- Anna Valencia, Chicago City Clerk (2017–present)
- 4 DuPage County Board members

Labor union

- Associated Fire Fighters of Illinois
- Elgin Professional Firefighters Union Local 439
- International Association of Fire Fighters Local 2061
- International Association of Fire Fighters Local 2340
- National Association of Letter Carriers Branch 2076

Organizations

- College Democrats of America
- Congressional Black Caucus PAC
Melissa Bean

U.S. senators

- Tammy Duckworth, Illinois (2017–present)

U.S. representatives

- Bill Foster, IL-11 (2008–2011, 2013–present)
- Lois Frankel, FL-22 (2013–present)
- Steny Hoyer, MD-05 (1981–present)
- Greg Landsman, OH-01 (2023–present)
- Nancy Pelosi, former Speaker of the House (2007–2011, 2019–2023) from CA-11 (1987–present)
- Scott Peters, CA-50 (2013–present)
- Brad Schneider, IL-10 (2013–2015, 2017–present)
- Debbie Wasserman Schultz, FL-25 (2005–present)
- Greg Stanton, AZ-04 (2019–present)

Labor unions

- **American Federation of Government Employees**
- Chicago Fire Fighters Union Local 2
- Chicago Laborers' District Council

Organizations

- AIPAC
- Democratic Majority for Israel
- Elect Democratic Women
- **Giffords**
- **J Street**
- **Jewish Democratic Council of America**
- Joint Action Committee for Political Affairs (co-endorsement with Morrison)
- National Committee to Preserve Social Security and Medicare PAC
- NewDem Action Fund

Newspapers

- Chicago Tribune
- Daily Herald
Sanjyot Dunung

U.S. representatives

- Susie Lee, NV-03 (2019–present)
- Marilyn Strickland, WA-10 (2021–present)

Organizations

- ASPIRE PAC
- Vote Common Good
Neil Khot

U.S. representatives

- Danny Davis, IL-07 (1997–present)
- Shri Thanedar, MI-13 (2023–present)

State legislators

- Fred Crespo, state representative from the 44th district (2007–present)
- Stephanie Kifowit, state representative from the 84th district (2013–present)
Kevin Morrison

U.S. representatives

- Becca Balint, VT-AL (2023–present)
- Mike Quigley, IL-05 (2009–present)
- Jan Schakowsky, IL-09 (1993–present)
- Eric Sorensen, IL-17 (2023–present)
- Mark Takano, CA-39 (2013–present)
- Ritchie Torres, NY-15 (2021–present)
- Joe Walsh, former IL-08 (2011–2013) (former Republican)

State legislators

- Kimberly du Buclet, state representative from the 5th district (2023–present)
- Kelly Cassidy, state representative from the 14th district (2011–present)
- James Clayborne Jr., former majority leader of the Illinois Senate (2009–2019) from the 57th district (1995–2019)
- Lakesia Collins, state senator from the 5th district (2023–present)
- Barbara Flynn Currie, former Majority Leader of the Illinois House of Representatives (1997–2019) from the 25th district (1979–2019)
- Mary Edly-Allen, state senator from the 31st district (2023–present)
- Robyn Gabel, House Majority Leader (2023–present) from the 18th district (2010–present)
- Lauren Beth Gash, former state representative from the 60th district (1993–2001) and Lake County Democratic chair
- Nicolle Grasse, state representative from the 53rd district (2024–present)
- Greg Harris, former Majority Leader of the Illinois House of Representatives (2019–2023) from the 13th district (2006–2023)
- Barbara Hernandez, state representative from the 61st district (2019–present)
- Adriane Johnson, state senator from the 30th district (2020–present)
- Dan Kotowski, former state senator from the 28th district (2007–2015)
- Theresa Mah, state representative from the 24th district (2017–present)
- Robert Martwick, state senator from the 10th district (2019–present)
- Joyce Mason, state representative from the 83rd district (2019–present)
- Mike Simmons, state senator from the 7th district (2021–present)
- Mark Walker, state senator from the 27th district (2024–present)

Local officials

- Frank Aguilar, Cook County commissioner from the 16th district (2020–present)
- Charles Bernardini, Chicago alder from the 43rd ward (1993–1999)
- Scott Britton, Cook County commissioner from the 14th district (2018–present)
- George Cardenas, member of the Cook County Board of Review from the 1st district (2022–present)
- Thomas Chiola, former judge of the Circuit Court of Cook County from the 8th subcircuit (1994–2009)
- Angela Clay, Chicago alder from the 46th ward (2023–present)
- John Daley, Cook County commissioner from the 11th district (1992–present)
- Bridget Gainer, Cook County commissioner from the 10th district (2009–present)
- Maria Hadden, Chicago alder from the 49th ward (2019–present)
- Fritz Kaegi, Cook County Assessor (2018–present)
- Timmy Knudsen, Chicago alder from the 43rd ward (2022–present)
- Bennett Lawson, Chicago alder from the 44th ward (2023–present)
- Nicole Lee, Chicago alder from the 11th ward (2022–present)
- Bill Lowry, Cook County commissioner from the 3rd district (2018–present)
- Kisha McCaskill, Cook County commissioner from the 5th district (2025–present)
- Stanley Moore, Cook County commissioner from the 4th district (2013–present)
- Josina Morita, Cook County commissioner from the 13th district (2022–present)
- Lamont Robinson, Chicago alder from the 4th ward (2023–present)
- Michael Scott Jr., Cook County commissioner from the 2nd district (2024–present)
- Peter Silvestri, former Cook County commissioner from the 9th district (1994–2022)
- Tara Stamps, Cook County commissioner from the 1st district (2023–present)
- Maggie Trevor, Cook County commissioner from the 9th district (2022–present)
- 5 Metropolitan Water Reclamation District of Greater Chicago commissioners

Labor unions

- Cook County College Teachers Union Local 1600
- Illinois Federation of Teachers
- Northwest Suburban Teachers Union Local 1211
- West Suburban Teachers Union Local 571

Organizations

- Equality PAC
- Illinois National Organization for Women PAC
- Independent Voters of Illinois-Independent Precinct Organization
- Indivisible Elk Grove Township
- Joint Action Committee for Political Affairs (co-endorsement with Bean)
- LGBTQ+ Victory Fund
- National Restaurant Association

Newspapers

- Journal & Topics
Dan Tully

Executive branch officials

- Patrick Murphy, former Under Secretary of the Army (2016–2017)

State legislators

- Marty Moylan, state representative from the 55th district (2011–present)
- Mike Porfirio, state senator from the 11th district (2023–present)

Local officials

- Bill Conway, Chicago alder from the 34th Ward (2023–present)
- Gil Villegas, Chicago alder from the 36th ward (2015–present)

Labor unions

- Gasworkers Local 18007
- International Union of Elevator Constructors Local 2

Organizations

- With Honor Fund
Declined to endorse

Labor unions

- Chicago Federation of Labor
- Illinois AFL-CIO
- Plumbers Local 130

==== Fundraising ====
Italics indicate a withdrawn candidate.

Campaign finance reports as of February 25, 2026
Candidate	Raised	Spent	Cash on hand
Junaid Ahmed (D)	$1,367,125	$1,131,262	$235,862
Yasmeen Bankole (D)	$447,366	$326,551	$120,815
Melissa Bean (D)	$1,642,587	$1,233,975	$408,612
Sanjyot Dunung (D)	$362,734	$343,367	$19,366
Christ Kallas (D)	$12,725	$12,725	$0
Neil Khot (D)	$1,983,578	$1,814,812	$168,765
Kevin Morrison (D)	$626,019	$565,978	$60,041
Dan Tully (D)	$705,085	$453,371	$251,714
Ryan Vetticad (D)	$121,961	$33,951	$88,009
Source: Federal Election Commission

==== Polling ====
Poll source	Date(s) administered	Sample size	Margin of error	Junaid Ahmed	Melissa Bean	Neil Khot	Kevin Morrison	Other	Undecided
Global Eye Magazine	March 14–15, 2026	677 (V)	–	23%	**28%**	18%	14%	3% (Note: Dan Tully with 3%)	14%
Normington Petts (D) (Note: Poll sponsored by Bean's campaign)	August 18–21, 2025	400 (RV)	± 4.9%	8%	**10%**	1%	5%	7% (Note: Yasmeen Bankole and Dan Tully with 3%; "Other candidates" with 1%)	**68%**

==== Results ====
Democratic primary results
Party	Candidate	Votes	%
**Democratic**	**Melissa Bean**	**22,279**	**31.6**
Democratic	Junaid Ahmed	18,954	26.9
Democratic	Dan Tully	8,906	12.6
Democratic	Yasmeen Bankole	6,752	9.6
Democratic	Kevin Morrison	6,377	9.0
Democratic	Neil Khot	4,683	6.6
Democratic	Sanjyot Dunung	1,773	2.5
Democratic	Ryan Vetticad	794	1.1
Total votes		**70,518**	**100.0**

=== Republican primary ===
==== Nominee ====
- Jennifer Davis, service technology company founder

==== Eliminated in primary ====
- Kevin Ake, accountant and candidate for Cook County Board of Commissioners 15th district in 2022
- Herbert Hebein, nominee for Illinois's 35th House of Representatives district in 2024
- Mark Rice, investor and nominee for this district in 2024

==== Endorsements ====
Jennifer Davis

State legislators

- Dan McConchie, former minority leader of the Illinois Senate (2021–2023) from the 26th district (2016–2025)

Organizations

- Illinois Young Republicans

Newspapers

- Chicago Tribune
- Daily Herald
- Journal & Topics
Mark Rice

Organizations

- Illinois Family Action

==== Fundraising ====
Campaign finance reports as of February 25, 2026
Candidate	Raised	Spent	Cash on hand
Jennifer Davis (R)	$621,895	$411,026	$210,868
Mark Rice (R)	$139,699	$123,334	$117,979
Source: Federal Election Commission

==== Forum ====
2026 Illinois' 8th congressional district Republican primary candidate forum
No.	Date	Host	Moderator	Link	Republican	Republican	Republican	Republican
Key: P Participant A Absent N Not invited I Invited W Withdrawn								
Key: P Participant A Absent N Not invited I Invited W Withdrawn					Kevin Ake	Jennifer Davis	Herbert Hebein	Mark Rice
1	Feb. 7, 2026	Harper College; Illinois Muslim Action Network; League of Women Voters of the Palatine, Barrington and Schaumburg Areas	Samantha Horia		**P**	**P**	**N**	**P**

==== Results ====
Republican primary results
Party	Candidate	Votes	%
**Republican**	**Jennifer Davis**	**14,635**	**51.4**
Republican	Mark Rice	11,437	40.2
Republican	Kevin Ake	1,263	4.4
Republican	Herbert Hebein	1,111	3.9
Total votes		**28,446**	**100.0**

=== General election ===
==== Predictions ====
Source	Ranking	As of
Decision Desk HQ	Safe D	September 8, 2026
The Cook Political Report	Solid D	February 6, 2025
Inside Elections	Solid D	December 5, 2025
Sabato's Crystal Ball	Safe D	July 15, 2025

==== Fundraising ====
Campaign finance reports as of April 25, 2026
Candidate	Raised	Spent	Cash on hand
Melissa Bean (D)	$1,764,192	$1,716,674	$47,518
Jennifer Davis (R)	$938,039	$520,656	$417,383
Source: Federal Election Commission

==== Results ====
2026 Illinois 8th congressional district election
Party	Candidate	Votes	%	±%
Democratic	Melissa Bean			
Republican	Jennifer Davis			
Total votes				

== District 9 ==
2026 Illinois's 9th congressional district election
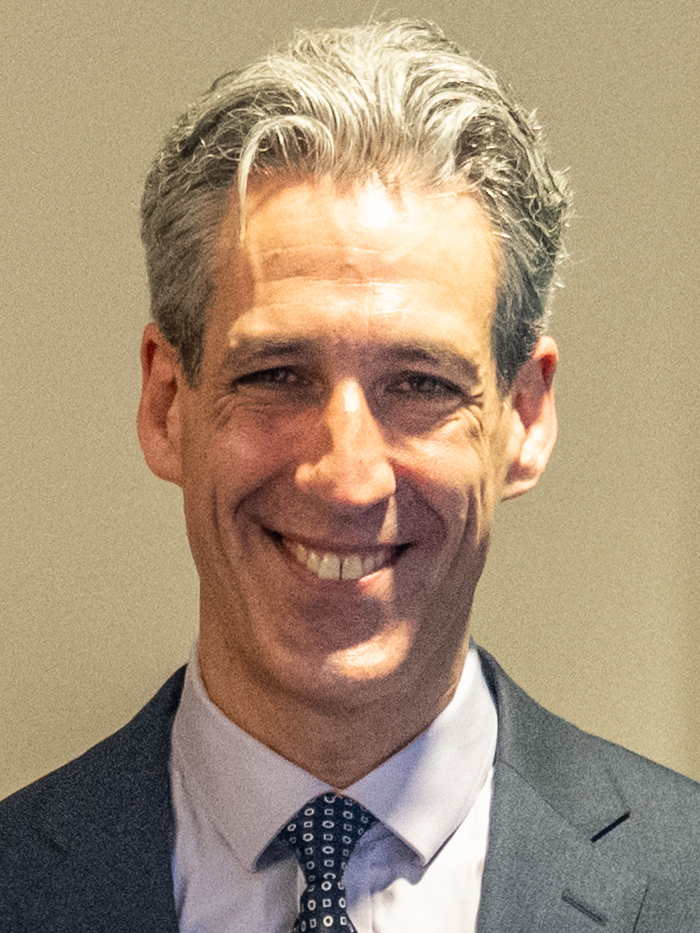

Nominee	Daniel Biss	John Elleson
Party	Democratic	Republican
- Biss: 60–70% 80–90%
Incumbent U.S. Representative
Jan Schakowsky
Democratic

The 9th district is based in northern Chicago and the North Shore, taking in Evanston and Skokie. The longtime incumbent is Democrat Jan Schakowsky, who was initially elected to the seat in 1998, and re-elected with 68.4% of the vote in 2024. Schakowsky is not running for re-election.

=== Democratic primary ===
==== Nominee ====
- Daniel Biss, mayor of Evanston (2021–present), state senator from the 9th district (2013–2019), and candidate for governor in 2018

==== Eliminated in primary ====
- Kat Abughazaleh, journalist and social media influencer
- Bushra Amiwala, member of the Skokie School District 73½ Board of Education (2019–present) and candidate for the Cook County Board of Commissioners 13th district in 2018
- Phil Andrew, former FBI agent, survivor of the 1988 Winnetka spree
- Patricia Brown
- Jeff Cohen, economist
- Laura Fine, state senator from the 9th district (2019–present)
- Justin Ford, environmental health and safety professional
- Mark Fredrickson
- Hoan Huynh, state representative from the 13th district (2023–present) and candidate for the 5th district in 2022
- Bethany Johnson, data analyst
- Sam Polan, former policy adviser with the North American Aerospace Defense Command
- Nick Pyati, former teacher and federal prosecutor
- Howard Rosenblum, member of the Illinois Human Rights Commission and former CEO of the National Association of the Deaf
- Mike Simmons, state senator from the 7th district (2021–present)

==== Withdrawn ====
- David Abrevaya, mathematics teacher
- Miracle Jenkins, community organizer (endorsed Amiwala)
- Bruce Leon, Chicago 50th Ward committeeperson and candidate for the Chicago Board of Education in 2024 (endorsed Andrew)
- Jill Manrique, labor organizer and former member of the Niles Township High School District 219 Board of Education

==== Declined ====
- Kelly Cassidy, state representative from the 14th district (2011–present) (endorsed Biss)
- Daniel Didech, state representative from the 59th district (2019–present)
- Jennifer Gong-Gershowitz, state representative from the 17th district (2019–present)
- Jan Schakowsky, incumbent U.S. representative (endorsed Biss)

==== Endorsements ====
Endorsements in bold were made after the primary elections.

Kat Abughazaleh

U.S. representatives

- Jamaal Bowman, former NY-16 (2021–2025)
- Ro Khanna, CA-17 (2017–present)
- Ilhan Omar, MN-05 (2019–present)
- Rashida Tlaib, MI-12 (2019–present)

State legislators

- Abdelnasser Rashid, state representative from the 21st district (2023–present)

Individuals

- Mark Ruffalo, actor and producer

Labor unions

- Illinois Nurses Association

Organizations

- CAIR Action
- Gen-Z for Change
- High School Democrats of America (LGBTQ+ Caucus)
- IfNotNow Chicago
- Justice Democrats
- PAL PAC
- Patriotic Millionaires (co-endorsement with Biss)
- Peace Action
- Progressive Victory
- Sunrise Movement
- Track AIPAC (co-endorsement with Amiwala and Simmons)
- Voters of Tomorrow
Bushra Amiwala

U.S. representatives

- Marie Newman, former IL-03 (2021–2023)

Local officials

- Ras Baraka, mayor of Newark (2014–present)

Individuals

- Miracle Jenkins, community organizer and former candidate for this district

Organizations

- Indivisible Skokie–Morton Grove–Lincolnwood
- Track AIPAC (co-endorsement with Abughazaleh and Simmons)

Newspapers

- Journal & Topics
Phil Andrew

State legislators

- Dan Kotowski, former state senator from the 28th district (2007–2015)

Local officials

- Richard Devine, former Cook County State's Attorney (1996–2008)
- Steve Hagerty, former mayor of Evanston (2017–2021)
- Bruce Leon, Chicago 50th ward committeeperson and former candidate for this seat

Individuals

- Steve Kerr, coach of the Golden State Warriors

Labor unions

- Mount Prospect Firefighters Local 4119

Organizations

- Brady PAC
- Joint Action Committee for Political Affairs (co-endorsement with Biss and Fine)
Daniel Biss

U.S. senators

- Tammy Duckworth, Illinois (2017–present)
- Elizabeth Warren, Massachusetts (2013–present)

U.S. representatives

- Sean Casten, IL-06 (2019–present)
- Greg Casar, TX-35 (2023–present)
- Bill Foster, IL-11 (2008–2011, 2013–present)
- Maxwell Frost, FL-10 (2023–present)
- Chuy García, IL-04 (2019–present)
- Pramila Jayapal, WA-07 (2017–present)
- Sarah McBride, DE-AL (2025–present)
- Jamie Raskin, MD-08 (2017–present)
- Jan Schakowsky, IL-09 (1999–present)

Statewide officials

- Kwame Raoul, attorney general of Illinois (2019–present)

State legislators

- Mary Beth Canty, state representative from the 54th district (2023–present)
- Kelly Cassidy, state representative from the 14th district (2011–present)
- Sharon Chung, state representative from the 91st district (2023–present)
- Robyn Gabel, House Majority Leader (2023–present) from the 18th district (2010–present)
- Nicolle Grasse, state representative from the 53rd district (2024–present)
- Julie Hamos, former state representative from the 18th district (1998–2010)
- Suzanne Ness, state representative from the 66th district (2021–present)
- Heather Steans, former state senator from the 7th district (2008–2021)
- Mark Walker, state senator from the 27th district (2024–present)

Local officials

- Holly Kim, Lake County Treasurer (2018–present)
- Timmy Knudsen, Chicago alder from the 43rd ward (2022–present)
- James Lytle, former mayor of Evanston (1977–1985)
- Matt Martin, Chicago alder from the 47th ward (2019–present)
- David Orr, former Cook County Clerk (1990–2018)
- Maria Pappas, Cook County Treasurer (1998–present)
- Dick Simpson, former Chicago alder from the 44th ward (1971–1979)
- Elizabeth Tisdahl, former mayor of Evanston (2009–2017)
- Tom Tunney, former vice mayor of Chicago (2019–2023) and alder from the 44th ward (2003–2023)
- Andre Vasquez, Chicago alder from the 40th ward (2019–present)

Labor unions

- **American Federation of Government Employees**
- Chicago Federation of Labor
- Chicago Teachers Union
- Chicago Laborers' District Council
- Illinois AFL-CIO
- Illinois Federation of Teachers
- Illinois Painters District Council 14
- International Association of Fire Fighters Local 742
- Iron Workers District Council of Chicago & Vicinity
- International Brotherhood of Electrical Workers Local 134
- International Union of Bricklayers and Allied Craftworkers District Council 1
- International Union of Operating Engineers Local 150
- Mid-America Carpenters Regional Council
- International Union of Operating Engineers Local 150
- National Nurses United
- Plumbers Local 130
- SEIU Healthcare
- SEIU Illinois State Council
- UNITE HERE Local 1
- United Food and Commercial Workers Local 881

Organizations

- 314 Action
- Christopher Street Project
- Citizen Action Illinois
- Congressional Progressive Caucus PAC
- **End Citizens United**
- **Giffords**
- **Jewish Democratic Council of America**
- Joint Action Committee for Political Affairs (co-endorsement with Andrew and Fine)
- J Street
- League of Conservation Voters
- Natural Resources Defense Council
- Patriotic Millionaires (co-endorsement with Abughazaleh)
- Sierra Club
Laura Fine

U.S. representatives

- Cheri Bustos, former IL-17 (2013–2023)
- Lois Frankel, FL-22 (2013–present)
- Brad Schneider, IL-10 (2013–2015, 2017–present)
- Norma Torres, CA-35 (2015–present)

State legislators

- Christopher Belt, state senator from the 57th district (2019–present)
- Meg Loughran Cappel, state senator from the 49th district (2020–present)
- Margaret Croke, state representative from the 12th district (2021–present)
- Barbara Flynn Currie, former majority leader of the Illinois House of Representatives (1997–2019) from the 25th district (1979–2019)
- Mary Edly-Allen, state senator from the 31st district (2023–present)
- Laura Ellman, state senator from the 21st district (2019–present)
- Marcus Evans, state representative from the 33rd district (2012–present)
- Paul Faraci, state senator from the 52nd district (2023–present)
- Sara Feigenholtz, state senator from the 6th district (2020–present)
- Lauren Beth Gash, former state representative from the 60th district (1993–2001) and Lake County Democratic chair
- Suzy Glowiak, state senator from the 19th district (2013–present)
- Michael Hastings, state senator from the 24th district (2019–present)
- Jay Hoffman, state representative from the 113th district (1991–1997, 1997–2011, 2013–present)
- Linda Holmes, state senator from the 42nd district (2007–present)
- Adriane Johnson, state senator from the 30th district (2020–present)
- Gregg Johnson, state representative from the 72nd district (2023–present)
- Natalie Manley, state representative from the 98th district (2013–present)
- Joyce Mason, state representative from the 61st district (2019–present)
- Karen May, former state representative from the 58th district (2001–2012)
- Rita Mayfield, state representative from the 60th district (2010–present)
- Anna Moeller, state representative from the 43rd district (2014–present)
- Julie Morrison, state senator from the 29th district (2013–present)
- Marty Moylan, state representative from the 55th district (2013–present)
- Laura Murphy, state senator from the 28th district (2015–present)
- Tracy Katz Muhl, state representative from the 57th district (2024–present)
- Mike Porfirio, state senator from the 11th district (2023–present)
- Jeffrey Schoenberg, former state senator from the 9th district (2003–2013)
- Carol Sente, former state representative from the 59th district (2009–2019)
- Kathleen Willis, former state representative from the 77th district (2013–2023)

Local officials

- Scott Britton, Cook County commissioner from the 14th district (2018–present)
- Deb Conroy, chair of the DuPage County Board (2022–present)
- Atour Sargon, Lincolnwood trustee (2019–present)
- Debra Silverstein, Chicago alder from the 50th ward (2011–present)
- Larry Suffredin, former Cook County commissioner from the 13th district (2002–2022)

Labor unions

- International Union of Operating Engineers Local 150

Organizations

- AIPAC
- Elect Democratic Women
- Joint Action Committee for Political Affairs (co-endorsement with Andrew and Biss)

Newspapers

- Chicago Tribune
- Daily Herald
Hoan Huynh

U.S. representatives

- Dave Min, CA-47 (2025–present)

State legislators

- Gene Wu, minority leader of the Texas House of Representatives (2025–present) from the 137th district (2013–present)

Local officials

- Leni Manaa-Hoppenworth, Chicago alder from the 48th ward (2023–present)
Howard Rosenblum

Individuals

- Marlee Matlin, actress
Mike Simmons

U.S. representatives

- Mark Takano, CA-39 (2013–present)
- Ritchie Torres, NY-15 (2021–present)

Statewide officials

- Kate Brown, former Governor of Oregon (2015–2023)

State legislators

- Lakesia Collins, state senator from the 5th district (2023–present)
- Greg Harris, former Majority Leader of the Illinois House of Representatives (2019–2023) from the 13th district (2006–2023)
- Keturah Herron, Kentucky state senator from the 35th district (2025–present)
- Ian Mackey, Missouri state representative from the 99th district (2019–present)
- Brianna Titone, Colorado state representative from the 27th district (2019–present)
- Rachel Ventura, state senator from the 43rd district (2023–present)

Local officials

- Angela Clay, Chicago alder from the 46th ward (2023–present)
- Maria Hadden, Chicago alder from the 49th ward (2019–present)
- Harry Osterman, former Chicago alder from the 48th ward (2011–2023)

Labor unions

- Amalgamated Transit Union Locals 241 and 308
- Cook County College Teachers Union Local 1600
- Chicago Fire Fighters Union Local 2

Organizations

- Collective PAC
- Congressional Black Caucus PAC
- Equality PAC
- Indivisible Niles Maine Township
- LGBTQ+ Victory Fund
- Track AIPAC (co-endorsement with Abughazaleh and Amiwala)
Declined to endorse

Labor unions

- International Union of Operating Engineers Local 399

Organizations

- Democratic Party of Evanston
- New Trier Democrats

==== Fundraising ====
Italics indicate a withdrawn candidate.

Campaign finance reports as of February 25, 2026
Candidate	Raised	Spent	Cash on hand
Kat Abughazaleh (D)	$3,359,875	$2,977,254	$382,621
Bushra Amiwala (D)	$1,134,018	$949,350	$184,667
Phil Andrew (D)	$1,339,123	$1,166,047	$173,075
Daniel Biss (D)	$2,539,961	$1,894,041	$645,919
Jeff Cohen (D)	$788,225	$270,048	$518,176
Laura Fine (D)	$2,556,808	$2,095,128	$461,679
Justin Ford (D)	$28,078	$27,370	$341
Hoan Huynh (D)	$1,017,941	$640,503	$372,812
Miracle Jenkins (D)	$29,445	$27,184	$2,261
Bethany Johnson (D)	$2,723	$486	$2,237
Bruce Leon (D)	$901,579	$263,990	$637,588
Jill Manrique (D)	$5,397	$5,323	$73
Sam Polan (D)	$371,106	$327,023	$44,082
Nick Pyati (D)	$262,443	$216,441	$46,001
Howard Rosenblum (D) (Note: As last reported on December 31, 2025)	$129,474	$69,402	$36,844
Mike Simmons (D)	$414,048	$278,898	$135,150
Source: Federal Election Commission

==== Polling ====
Poll source	Date(s) administered	Sample size	Margin of error	Kat Abughazaleh	Bushra Amiwala	Phil Andrew	Daniel Biss	Laura Fine	Hoan Huynh	Mike Simmons	Other	Undecided
Public Policy Polling (D) (Note: Poll sponsored by the Evanston RoundTable)	March 9–10, 2026	741 (LV)	± 3.6%	20%	6%	7%	24%	14%	1%	10%	1% (Note: Ford with 4%)	17%
Public Policy Polling (D)	February 20–21, 2026	501 (LV)	± 4.4%	17%	4%	5%	24%	16%	2%	6%	4% (Note: "Someone else" with 4%)	22%
Community Pulse/Molitico (D) (Note: Poll sponsored by CAIR Action)	February 15–20, 2026	638 (RV)	± 3.9%	13%	7%	4%	31%	14%	2%	9%	1% (Note: Cohen with 1%; Polan with 0%)	21%
Impact Research (D) (Note: Poll sponsored by Biss's campaign)	February 5–10, 2026	500 (LV)	± 4.4%	18%	4%	7%	31%	18%	3%	7%	2% (Note: "Someone else" with 2%)	11%
GBAO Strategies (D) (Note: Poll sponsored by Fine's campaign)	January 26–29, 2026	500 (LV)	± 4.4%	14%	4%	4%	21%	**21%**	2%	7%	7% (Note: "Other" with 3%)	**23%**
Impact Research (D)	November 4–9, 2025	500 (LV)	± 4.4%	17%	3%	3%	31%	10%	4%	6%	4% (Note: Leon and "Someone Else" with 2%)	**21%**
Data for Progress (D) (Note: Poll sponsored by The Justice Coalition PAC, an organization seeking to improve U.S.-Palestine relations)	October 29 – November 3, 2025	569 (LV)	± 4.0%	**18%**	6%	1%	18%	10%	5%	6%	5% (Note: "Another candidate" with 4%; Polan with 1%; Cohen and Leon with 0%)	**31%**
MDW Communications (D) (Note: Poll sponsored by Abughazaleh's campaign)	October 14–16, 2025	917 (LV)	± 3.4%	13%	2%	2%	18%	9%	3%	4%	1% (Note: Leon with 1%; Cohen, Ford, Johnson, Manrique, Polan, Pyati, and Rosenblum with 0%)	**48%**
MDW Communications (D)	June 12–15, 2025	899 (LV)	–	10%	2%	0%	17%	8%	3%	4%	3% (Note: Villivalam with 3%; Ford, Jenkins, and Pyati with 0%)	**53%**

==== Results ====
Results by county: Biss: 20–30%; 30–40%; Abughazaleh: 30–40%

Results by precinct: Biss: 20–30%; 30–40%; 40–50%; Abughazaleh: 20–30%; 30–40%; 40–50%; 50–60%; 80–90%; Fine: 20–30%; 30–40%; 40–50%; 50–60%; 60–70%; 70–80%; Andrew: 30–40%; 40–50%; 50-60%; Amiwala: 20–30%; 30–40%; Tie: 20–30%; No Votes

Biss won the primary election, securing 29.6% of the vote to Abughazaleh's 25.9%. He led the polls in the portions of Cook County and Lake County, while Abughazaleh placed first in the portion of McHenry County.

Democratic primary results
Party	Candidate	Votes	%
**Democratic**	**Daniel Biss**	**38,804**	**29.4**
Democratic	Kat Abughazaleh	34,707	26.3
Democratic	Laura Fine	26,384	20.0
Democratic	Mike Simmons	9,419	7.1
Democratic	Phil Andrew	7,997	6.1
Democratic	Bushra Amiwala	6,692	5.1
Democratic	Hoan Huynh	2,343	1.8
Democratic	Patricia Brown	1,675	1.3
Democratic	Jeff Cohen	1,078	0.8
Democratic	Justin Ford	793	0.6
Democratic	Bethany Johnson	635	0.5
Democratic	Sam Polan	528	0.4
Democratic	Howard Rosenblum	312	0.2
Democratic	Nick Pyati	241	0.2
Democratic	Mark Fredrickson	232	0.2
Total votes		**131,840**	**100.0**

=== Republican primary ===
==== Nominee ====
- John Elleson, pastor and nominee for this district in 2018

==== Eliminated in primary ====
- Rocío Cleveland, educational paraprofessional and interpreter
- Paul Friedman
- Mark Su, news website publisher

==== Endorsements ====
John Elleson

Newspapers

- Chicago Tribune
- Journal & Topics
Declined to endorse

Newspapers

- Daily Herald

==== Fundraising ====
Campaign finance reports as of December 31, 2025
Candidate	Raised	Spent	Cash on hand
Paul Friedman (R)	$2,700	$0	$2,700
Mark Su (R)	$19,868	$12,029	$7,839
Source: Federal Election Commission

==== Results ====
Republican primary results
Party	Candidate	Votes	%
**Republican**	**John Elleson**	**7,545**	**48.9**
Republican	Paul Friedman	5,185	33.6
Republican	Rocío Cleveland	1,469	9.5
Republican	Mark Su	1,245	8.1
Total votes		**15,444**	**100.0**

=== Independents ===
==== Filed paperwork ====
- Delila Barrera, behavioral technician and activist

=== General election ===
==== Predictions ====
Source	Ranking	As of
Decision Desk HQ	Safe D	July 14, 2026
The Cook Political Report	Solid D	February 6, 2025
Inside Elections	Solid D	December 5, 2025
Sabato's Crystal Ball	Safe D	July 15, 2025

==== Post-primary endorsements ====
Daniel Biss (D)

Labor unions

- Actors' Equity Association
- International Brotherhood of Teamsters Joint Council 25

Organizations

- Our Revolution
- Progressive Change Campaign Committee

==== Fundraising ====
Campaign finance reports as of April 25, 2026
Candidate	Raised	Spent	Cash on hand
Daniel Biss (D)	$2,830,829	$2,563,666	$267,163
John Elleson (R)	$0	$0	$0
Source: Federal Election Commission

==== Results ====
2026 Illinois 9th congressional district election
Party	Candidate	Votes	%	±%
Democratic	Daniel Biss			
Republican	John Elleson			
Total votes				

== District 10 ==
2026 Illinois's 10th congressional district election
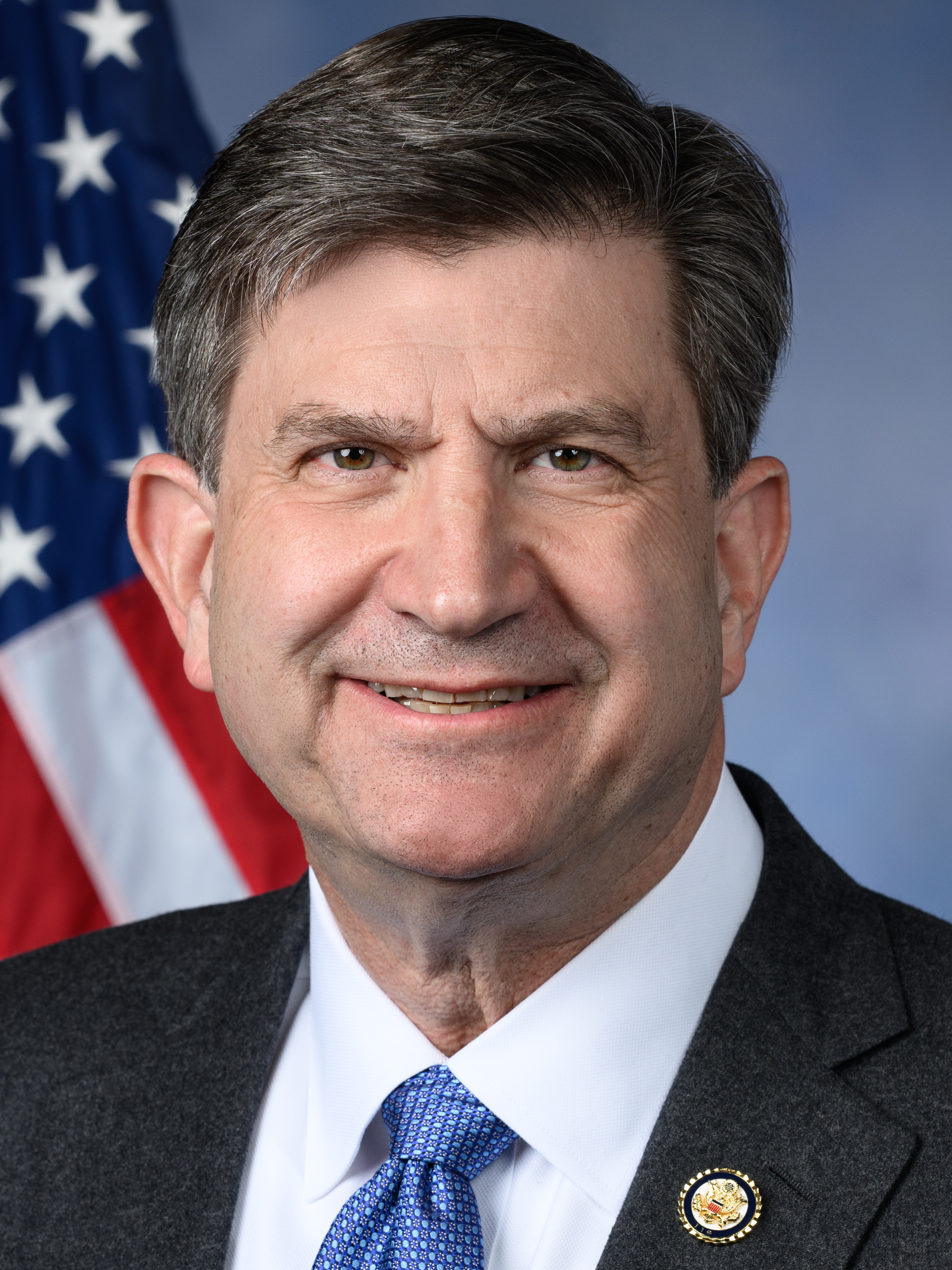

Nominee	Brad Schneider	Carl Lambrecht
Party	Democratic	Republican
- Schneider: 70–80% Lambrecht: 50–60%
Incumbent U.S. Representative
Brad Schneider
Democratic

The 10th district is based in the northern suburbs and exurbs of Chicago, including Mundelein, Northbrook, and Waukegan. The incumbent is Democrat Brad Schneider, who was re-elected with 60.0% of the vote in 2024.

=== Democratic primary ===
==== Nominee ====
- Brad Schneider, incumbent U.S. representative

==== Eliminated in primary ====
- Morgan Coghill, plywood importer

==== Disqualified ====
- John Minarcik, pathologist

==== Withdrawn ====
- Thomas Rudd, former Lake County coroner

==== Endorsements ====
Morgan Coghill

Organizations

- CAIR Action Midwest
- Track AIPAC
Brad Schneider

U.S. senators

- Tammy Duckworth, Illinois (2017–present)
- Dick Durbin, Illinois (1997–present)

U.S. representatives

- Nikki Budzinski, IL-13 (2023–present)
- Bill Foster, IL-11 (2008–2011, 2013–present)
- Sean Casten, IL-06 (2019–present)
- Mike Quigley, IL-05 (2009–present)
- Eric Sorensen, IL-17 (2023–present)

Statewide officials

- Mike Frerichs, Illinois Treasurer (2015–present)
- Alexi Giannoulias, Illinois Secretary of State (2023–present)
- Susana Mendoza, Illinois Comptroller (2016–present)
- JB Pritzker, Governor of Illinois (2019–present)

State legislators

- Daniel Didech, state representative from the 59th district (2019–present)
- Mary Edly-Allen, state senator from the 31st district (2023–present)
- Robyn Gabel, Majority Leader of the Illinois House of Representatives (2023–present) from the 18th district (2010–present)
- Lauren Beth Gash, former state representative from the 60th district (1993–2001) and Lake County Democratic chair
- Jennifer Gong-Gershowitz, state representative from the 17th district (2019–present)
- Adriane Johnson, state senator from the 30th district (2020–present)
- Joyce Mason, state representative from the 61st district (2019–present)
- Rita Mayfield, state representative from the 60th district (2010–present)
- Bob Morgan, state representative from the 58th district (2019–present)
- Julie Morrison, state senator from the 29th district (2013–present)
- Tracy Katz Muhl, state representative from the 57th district (2024–present)
- Ram Villivalam, state senator from the 8th district (2019–present)
- Mark Walker, state senator from the 24th district (2024–present)

Local officials

- Scott Britton, Cook County commissioner from the 14th district (2018–present)
- Fritz Kaegi, Cook County Assessor (2018–present)
- Toni Preckwinkle, President of the Cook County Board of Commissioners (2010–present)
- 14 Lake County Board members

Labor unions

- American Federation of Government Employees
- Chicago Federation of Labor
- Illinois AFL-CIO
- Illinois Federation of Teachers
- International Union of Operating Engineers Locals 150 and 399
- Plumbers Local 130
- SEIU Healthcare
- SEIU Illinois State Council

Organizations

- 314 Action
- AIPAC
- Democratic Majority for Israel
- Giffords
- Humane World Action Fund
- Jewish Democratic Council of America
- Joint Action Committee for Political Affairs
- New Trier Democrats
- Planned Parenthood Action Fund
- Population Connection
- Sierra Club

Newspapers

- Chicago Tribune
- Daily Herald

==== Fundraising ====
Campaign finance reports as of February 25, 2026
Candidate	Raised	Spent	Cash on hand
Morgan Coghill (D)	$93,662	$88,158	$5,504
Brad Schneider (D)	$2,343,264	$1,667,725	$1,646,965
Source: Federal Election Commission

==== Results ====
Democratic primary results
Party	Candidate	Votes	%
Democratic	Brad Schneider (incumbent)	56,353	78.8
Democratic	Morgan Coghill	15,152	21.2
Total votes		71,505	100.0

=== Republican primary ===
==== Nominee ====
- Carl Lambrecht, optics manufacturer and nominee for Illinois's 58th House of Representatives district in 2024

==== Results ====
Republican primary results
Party	Candidate	Votes	%
Republican	Carl Lambrecht	18,857	100.0
Total votes		18,857	100.0

=== Independents ===
==== Filed paperwork ====
- Austin Mink

=== General election ===
==== Predictions ====
Source	Ranking	As of
Decision Desk HQ	Safe D	July 14, 2026
The Cook Political Report	Solid D	February 6, 2025
Inside Elections	Solid D	December 5, 2025
Sabato's Crystal Ball	Safe D	July 15, 2025

==== Fundraising ====
Campaign finance reports as of April 25, 2026
Candidate	Raised	Spent	Cash on hand
Brad Schneider (D)	$2,681,267	$1,889,965	$1,762,728
Carl Lambrecht (R)	$0	$0	$0
Source: Federal Election Commission

==== Results ====
2026 Illinois 10th congressional district election
Party	Candidate	Votes	%	±%
Democratic	Brad Schneider (Incumbent)			
Republican	Carl Lambrecht			
Total votes				

== District 11 ==
2026 Illinois's 11th congressional district election
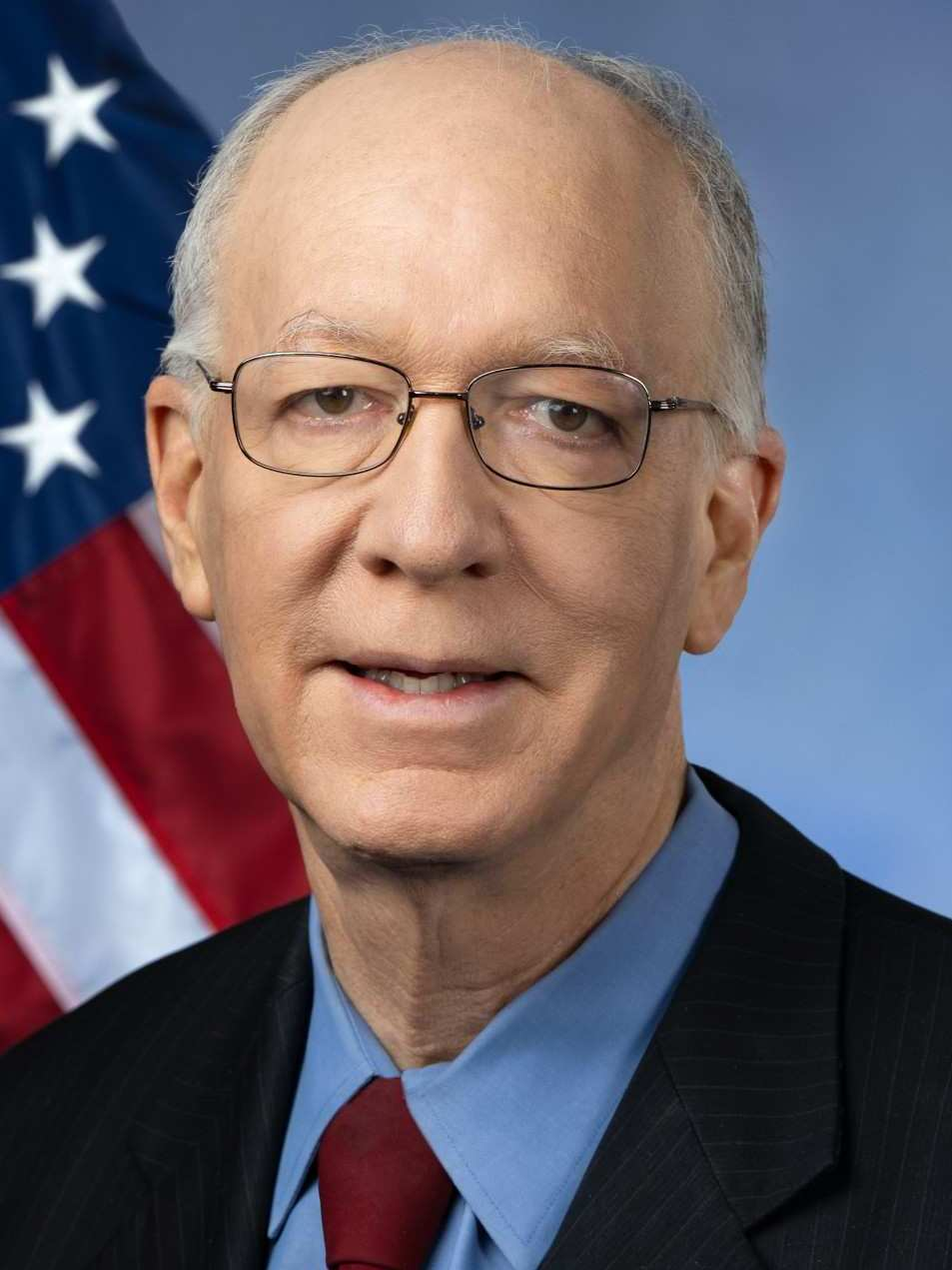

Nominee	Bill Foster	Jeff Walter
Party	Democratic	Republican
- Foster: 50–60% 60–70% 70–80% Walter: 50–60%
Incumbent U.S. Representative
Bill Foster
Democratic

The 11th district is based in the western suburbs and exurbs of Chicago, including Aurora, Naperville, and Belvidere. The incumbent is Democrat Bill Foster, who was re-elected with 55.6% of the vote in 2024.

=== Democratic primary ===
==== Nominee ====
- Bill Foster, incumbent U.S. representative

==== Endorsements ====
Bill Foster

Labor unions

- American Federation of Government Employees
- Chicago Federation of Labor
- Illinois AFL-CIO
- International Union of Operating Engineers Locals 150 and 399
- Plumbers Local 130
- SEIU Healthcare
- SEIU Illinois State Council

Organizations

- J Street PAC
- Planned Parenthood Action Fund

==== Fundraising ====
Campaign finance reports as of February 25, 2026
Candidate	Raised	Spent	Cash on hand
Bill Foster (D)	$1,518,157	$878,754	$2,189,967
Source: Federal Election Commission

==== Results ====
Democratic primary results
Party	Candidate	Votes	%
Democratic	Bill Foster (incumbent)	69,637	100.0
Total votes		69,637	100.0

=== Republican primary ===
==== Nominee ====
- Jeff Walter, mayor of Elburn

==== Eliminated in primary ====
- Tedora Brown, home building contractor
- Charles Kim, businessman and candidate for the 14th district in 2024
- Michael Pierce, defense contractor

==== Endorsements ====
Jeff Walter

Newspapers

- Chicago Tribune
- Daily Herald

==== Fundraising ====
Campaign finance reports as of February 25, 2026
Candidate	Raised	Spent	Cash on hand
Charles Kim (R)	$106,224	$27,325	$66,365
Michael Pierce (R)	$94,182	$61,817	$32,365
Jeff Walter (R)	$166,310	$151,682	$14,628
Source: Federal Election Commission

==== Results ====
Republican primary results
Party	Candidate	Votes	%
Republican	Jeff Walter	13,877	42.6
Republican	Michael Pierce	12,653	38.8
Republican	Charles Kim	4,197	12.9
Republican	Tedora Brown	1,856	5.7
Total votes		32,583	100.0

=== General election ===
==== Predictions ====
Source	Ranking	As of
Decision Desk HQ	Safe D	July 14, 2026
The Cook Political Report	Solid D	February 6, 2025
Inside Elections	Solid D	December 5, 2025
Sabato's Crystal Ball	Safe D	July 15, 2025

==== Fundraising ====
Campaign finance reports as of April 25, 2026
Candidate	Raised	Spent	Cash on hand
Bill Foster (D)	$1,769,713	$1,043,650	$2,276,627
Jeff Walter (R)	$186,262	$177,186	$9,075
Source: Federal Election Commission

==== Results ====
2026 Illinois 11th congressional district election
Party	Candidate	Votes	%	±%
Democratic	Bill Foster (Incumbent)			
Republican	Jeff Walter			
Total votes				

== District 12 ==
2026 Illinois's 12th congressional district election
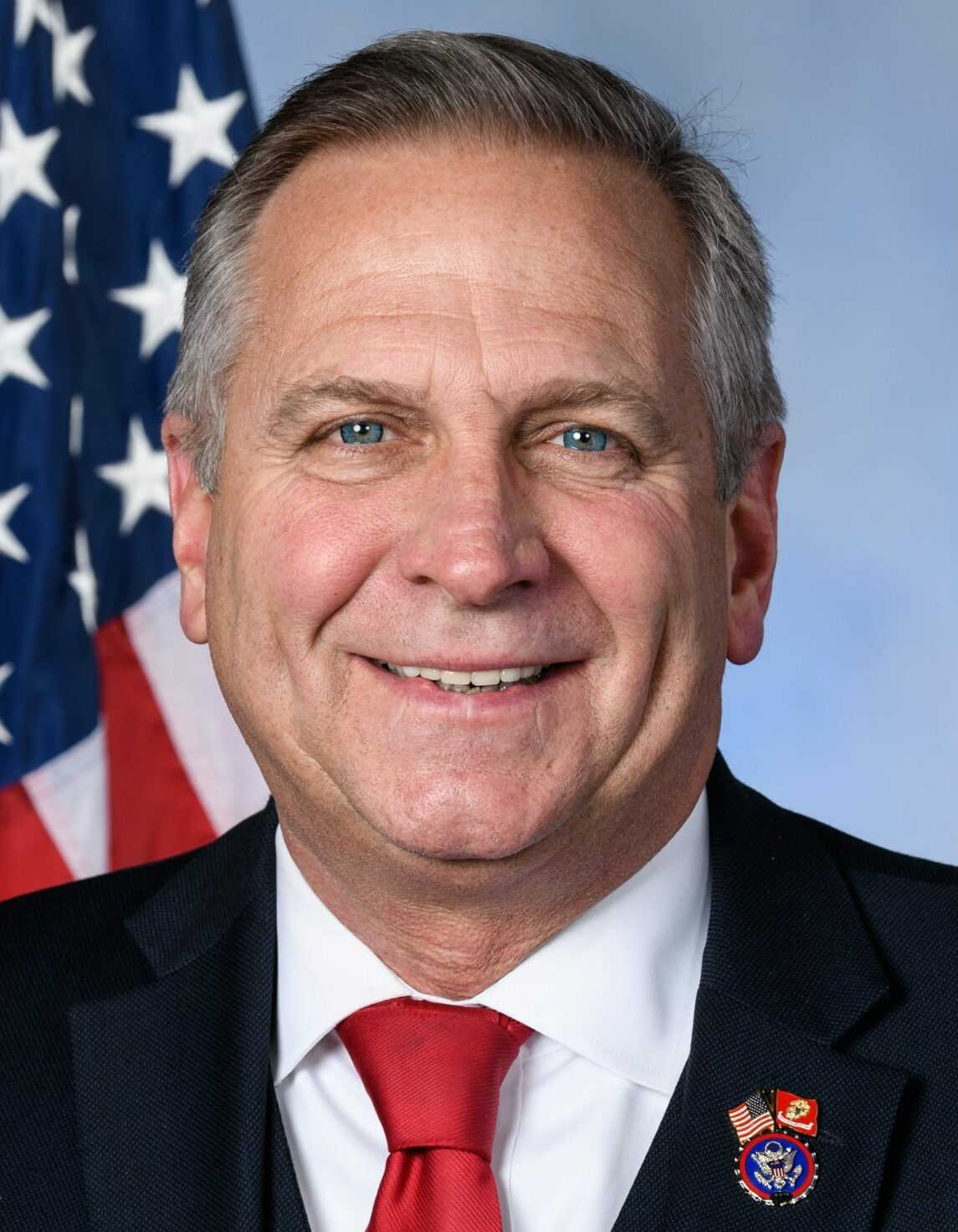

Nominee	Mike Bost	Julie Fortier
Party	Republican	Democratic
- Bost: 50–60% 60–70% 70–80% 80–90% Fortier: 50–60%
Incumbent U.S. Representative
Mike Bost
Republican

The 12th district is based in southern Illinois, taking in the southeastern St. Louis exurbs. It includes Carbondale, Centralia, Marion, and O'Fallon. The incumbent is Republican Mike Bost, who was re-elected with 74.2% of the vote in 2024.

=== Republican primary ===
==== Nominee ====
- Mike Bost, incumbent U.S. representative

==== Endorsements ====
Mike Bost

Executive Branch officials

- Donald Trump, 45th and 47th president of the United States (2017–2021, 2025–present)

Labor unions

- Illinois Fraternal Order of Police

Organizations

- AIPAC

==== Fundraising ====
Campaign finance reports as of February 25, 2026
Candidate	Raised	Spent	Cash on hand
Mike Bost (R)	$806,127	$677,604	$480,818
Source: Federal Election Commission

==== Results ====
Republican primary results
Party	Candidate	Votes	%
**Republican**	**Mike Bost (incumbent)**	**81,400**	**100.0**
Total votes		**81,400**	**100.0**

=== Democratic primary ===
==== Nominee ====
- Julie Fortier, research microbiologist and Air Force veteran

==== Endorsements ====
Endorsements in bold were made after the primary elections.

Julie Fortier

Labor unions

- Illinois AFL-CIO
- International Union of Operating Engineers Local 399

Organizations

- Citizen Action Illinois
- **Progressive Democrats of America**

==== Fundraising ====
Campaign finance reports as of February 25, 2026
Candidate	Raised	Spent	Cash on hand
Julie Fortier (D)	$27,301	$7,569	$19,732
Source: Federal Election Commission

==== Results ====
Democratic primary results
Party	Candidate	Votes	%
**Democratic**	**Julie Fortier**	**26,791**	**100.0**
Total votes		**26,791**	**100.0**

=== General election ===
==== Predictions ====
Source	Ranking	As of
Decision Desk HQ	Safe R	October 10, 2026
The Cook Political Report	Solid R	October 7, 2026
Inside Elections	Solid R	October 5, 2026
Sabato's Crystal Ball	Safe R	October 2, 2026

==== Fundraising ====
Campaign finance reports as of April 25, 2026
Candidate	Raised	Spent	Cash on hand
Mike Bost (R)	$1,107,544	$753,405	$706,435
Julie Fortier (D)	$40,820	$13,514	$27,307
Source: Federal Election Commission

==== Results ====
2026 Illinois 12th congressional district election
Party	Candidate	Votes	%	±%
Republican	Mike Bost (Incumbent)			
Democratic	Julie Fortier			
Total votes				

== District 13 ==
2026 Illinois's 13th congressional district election
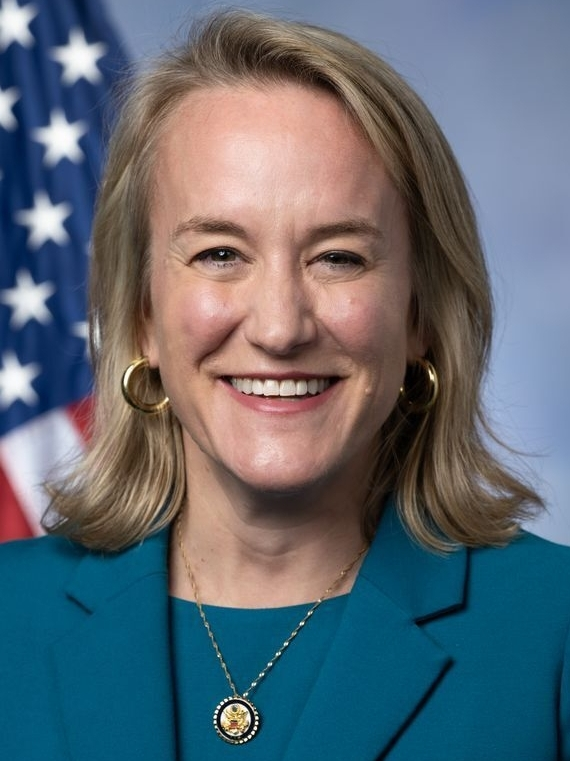

Nominee	Nikki Budzinski	Jeff Wilson
Party	Democratic	Republican
- Budzinski: 50–60% 70–80% Wilson: 50–60% 60–70%
Incumbent U.S. Representative
Nikki Budzinski
Democratic

The 13th district is based in central Illinois, stretching from the Champaign–Urbana metropolitan area to the eastern St. Louis suburbs and taking in Decatur as well as the state capital, Springfield. The incumbent is Democrat Nikki Budzinski, who was re-elected with 58.1% of the vote in 2024.

=== Democratic primary ===
==== Nominee ====
- Nikki Budzinski, incumbent U.S. representative

==== Eliminated in primary ====
- Dylan Blaha, medical research scientist

==== Endorsements ====
Endorsements in bold were made after the primary elections.

Nikki Budzinski

Labor unions

- American Federation of Government Employees
- American Federation of State, County and Municipal Employees Council 31
- Associated Fire Fighters of Illinois
- Illinois AFL-CIO
- Illinois Federation of Teachers
- Illinois Pipe Trades Association
- International Union of Operating Engineers Locals 150 and 399
- Ironworkers District Council of St. Louis & Vicinity
- Mid-America Carpenters Regional Council
- Midwest Region Laborers
- SEIU Healthcare
- SEIU Illinois State Council
- United Auto Workers
- United Food and Commercial Workers Local 881
- United Mine Workers COMPAC Council
- United Steelworkers District 7

Organizations

- AIPAC
- Citizen Action Illinois
- Democratic Majority for Israel
- Equality PAC
- **Giffords**
- Humane World Action Fund
- Illinois Alliance for Retired Americans
- Jewish Democratic Council of America
- Joint Action Committee for Political Affairs
- J Street PAC
- League of Conservation Voters
- National Organization for Women PAC
- Natural Resources Defense Council Action Fund
- Planned Parenthood Action Fund

Party chapters

- Madison County Democrats

Newspapers

- Chicago Tribune
Dylan Blaha

Organizations

- 50501
- Peace Action
- Progressive Democrats of America
- Track AIPAC

==== Fundraising ====
Campaign finance reports as of February 25, 2026
Candidate	Raised	Spent	Cash on hand
Dylan Blaha (D)	$89,622	$82,792	$6,830
Nikki Budzinski (D)	$2,140,637	$1,376,983	$2,548,387
Source: Federal Election Commission

==== Results ====
Results by county: Budzinski—80–90% Budzinski—70–80% Budzinski—60–70%

Democratic primary results
Party	Candidate	Votes	%
**Democratic**	**Nikki Budzinski (incumbent)**	**44,763**	**75.1**
Democratic	Dylan Blaha	14,850	24.9
Total votes		**59,613**	**100.0**

=== Republican primary ===
==== Nominee ====
- Jeff Wilson, Champaign County Board member

==== Eliminated in primary ====
- Joshua Loyd, businessman and nominee for this district in 2024

==== Endorsements ====
Joshua Loyd

Newspapers

- Chicago Tribune

==== Fundraising ====
Campaign finance reports as of February 25, 2026
Candidate	Raised	Spent	Cash on hand
Joshua Loyd (R)	$16,776	$14,321	$2,824
Jeff Wilson (R)	$203,585	$154,273	$49,311
Source: Federal Election Commission

==== Results ====
Results by county: Wilson—70–80% Wilson—60–70%

Republican primary results
Party	Candidate	Votes	%
**Republican**	**Jeff Wilson**	**22,291**	**67.5**
Republican	Joshua Loyd	10,733	32.5
Total votes		**33,024**	**100.0**

=== General election ===
==== Predictions ====
Source	Ranking	As of
Decision Desk HQ	Safe D	July 14, 2026
The Cook Political Report	Solid D	February 6, 2025
Inside Elections	Solid D	December 5, 2025
Sabato's Crystal Ball	Safe D	July 15, 2025

==== Fundraising ====
Campaign finance reports as of April 25, 2026
Candidate	Raised	Spent	Cash on hand
Nikki Budzinski (D)	$2,458,602	$1,633,383	$2,609,951
Jeff Wilson (R)	$218,883	$192,345	$26,538
Source: Federal Election Commission

==== Results ====
2026 Illinois 13th congressional district election
Party	Candidate	Votes	%	±%
Democratic	Nikki Budzinski (Incumbent)			
Republican	Jeff Wilson			
Total votes				

== District 14 ==
2026 Illinois's 14th congressional district election
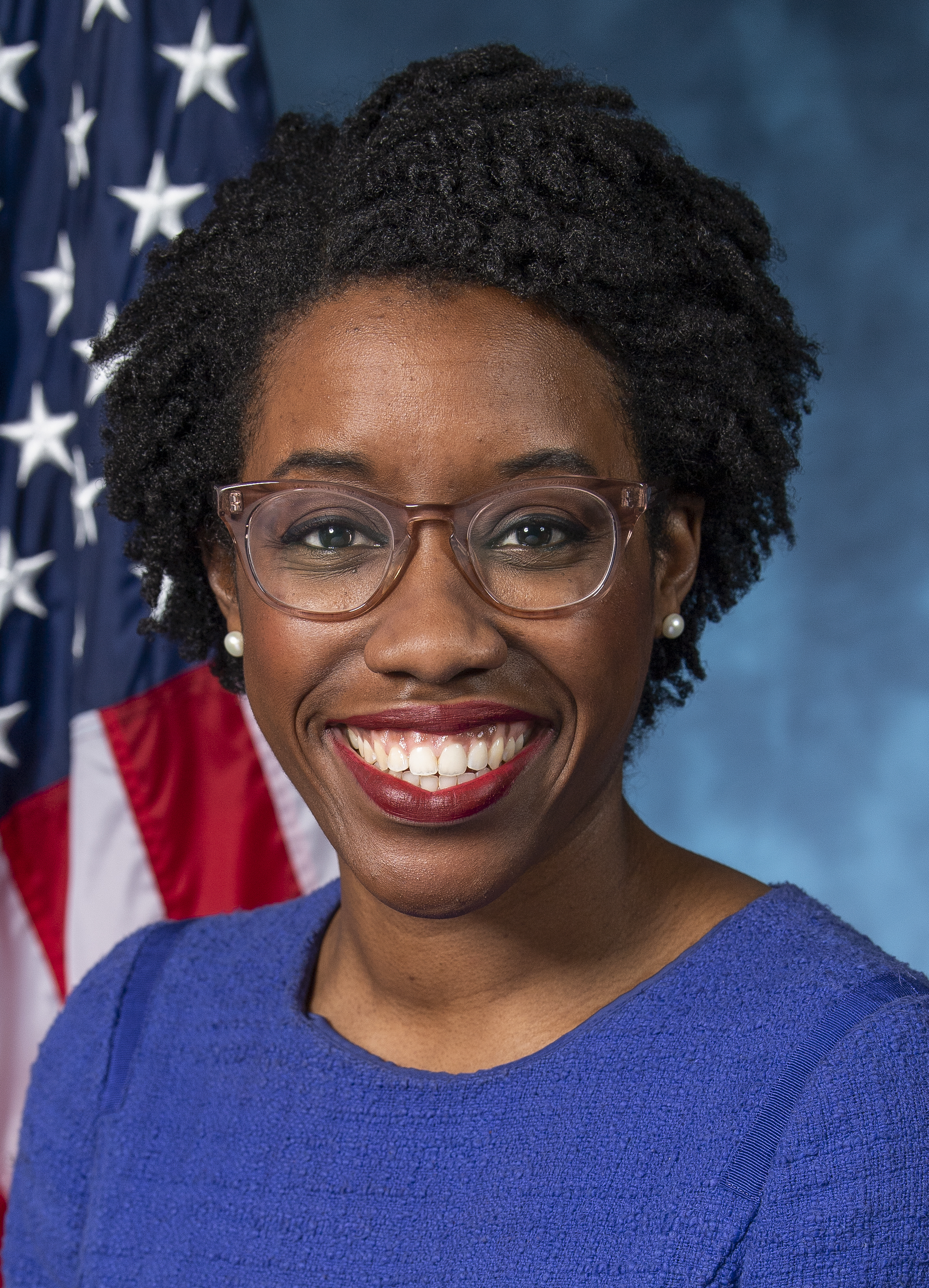

Nominee	Lauren Underwood	James Marter
Party	Democratic	Republican
- Underwood: 50–60% 60–70% Marter: 50–60%
Incumbent U.S. Representative
Lauren Underwood
Democratic

The 14th district is based in the western exurbs of Chicago, including all or parts of Aurora, DeKalb, Granville, Joliet, Montgomery, Naperville, Oswego, Ottawa, Peru, Plainfield, Shorewood, Spring Valley, Sugar Grove, and Sycamore. The incumbent is Democrat Lauren Underwood, who was re-elected with 55.1% of the vote in 2024.

=== Democratic primary ===
==== Nominee ====
- Lauren Underwood, incumbent U.S. representative

==== Endorsements ====
Endorsements in bold were made after the primary elections.

Lauren Underwood

U.S. representatives

- Hakeem Jeffries, House Minority Leader (2023–present) from NY-08 (2013–present)

Labor unions

- American Federation of Government Employees
- Illinois AFL-CIO
- International Union of Operating Engineers Locals 150 and 399
- SEIU Healthcare
- SEIU Illinois State Council

Organizations

- **Black Economic Alliance PAC**
- Jewish Democratic Council of America
- Joint Action Committee for Political Affairs
- **National Women's Political Caucus**
- Planned Parenthood Action Fund
- Population Connection
- Sierra Club

==== Fundraising ====
Campaign finance reports as of February 25, 2026
Candidate	Raised	Spent	Cash on hand
Lauren Underwood (D)	$1,719,428	$1,600,517	$1,174,012
Source: Federal Election Commission

==== Results ====
Democratic primary results
Party	Candidate	Votes	%
**Democratic**	**Lauren Underwood (incumbent)**	**56,414**	**100.0**
Total votes		**56,414**	**100.0**

=== Republican primary ===
==== Nominee ====
- James Marter, Oswego Public Library Board member and perennial candidate

==== Eliminated in primary ====
- Gary Vician, realtor and former Naperville township supervisor

==== Declined ====
- Jed Davis, state representative from the 75th district (2023–present) (running for re-election)

==== Endorsements ====
Declined to endorse

Newspapers

- Chicago Tribune

==== Fundraising ====
Campaign finance reports as of February 25, 2026
Candidate	Raised	Spent	Cash on hand
James Marter (R)	$84,832	$54,956	$33,920
Gary Vician (R)	$67,895	$65,793	$3,101
Source: Federal Election Commission

==== Results ====
Republican primary results
Party	Candidate	Votes	%
**Republican**	**James Marter**	**23,312**	**74.9**
Republican	Gary Vician	7,794	25.1
Total votes		**31,106**	**100.0**

=== General election ===
==== Predictions ====
Source	Ranking	As of
Decision Desk HQ	Safe D	October 1, 2026
The Cook Political Report	Solid D	February 6, 2025
Inside Elections	Solid D	December 5, 2025
Sabato's Crystal Ball	Safe D	July 15, 2025

==== Fundraising ====
Campaign finance reports as of April 25, 2026
Candidate	Raised	Spent	Cash on hand
Lauren Underwood (D)	$1,960,791	$1,690,021	$1,325,871
James Marter (R)	$99,287	$89,717	$13,613
Source: Federal Election Commission

==== Results ====
2026 Illinois 14th congressional district election
Party	Candidate	Votes	%	±%
Democratic	Lauren Underwood (Incumbent)			
Republican	James Marter			
Total votes				

== District 15 ==
2026 Illinois's 15th congressional district election
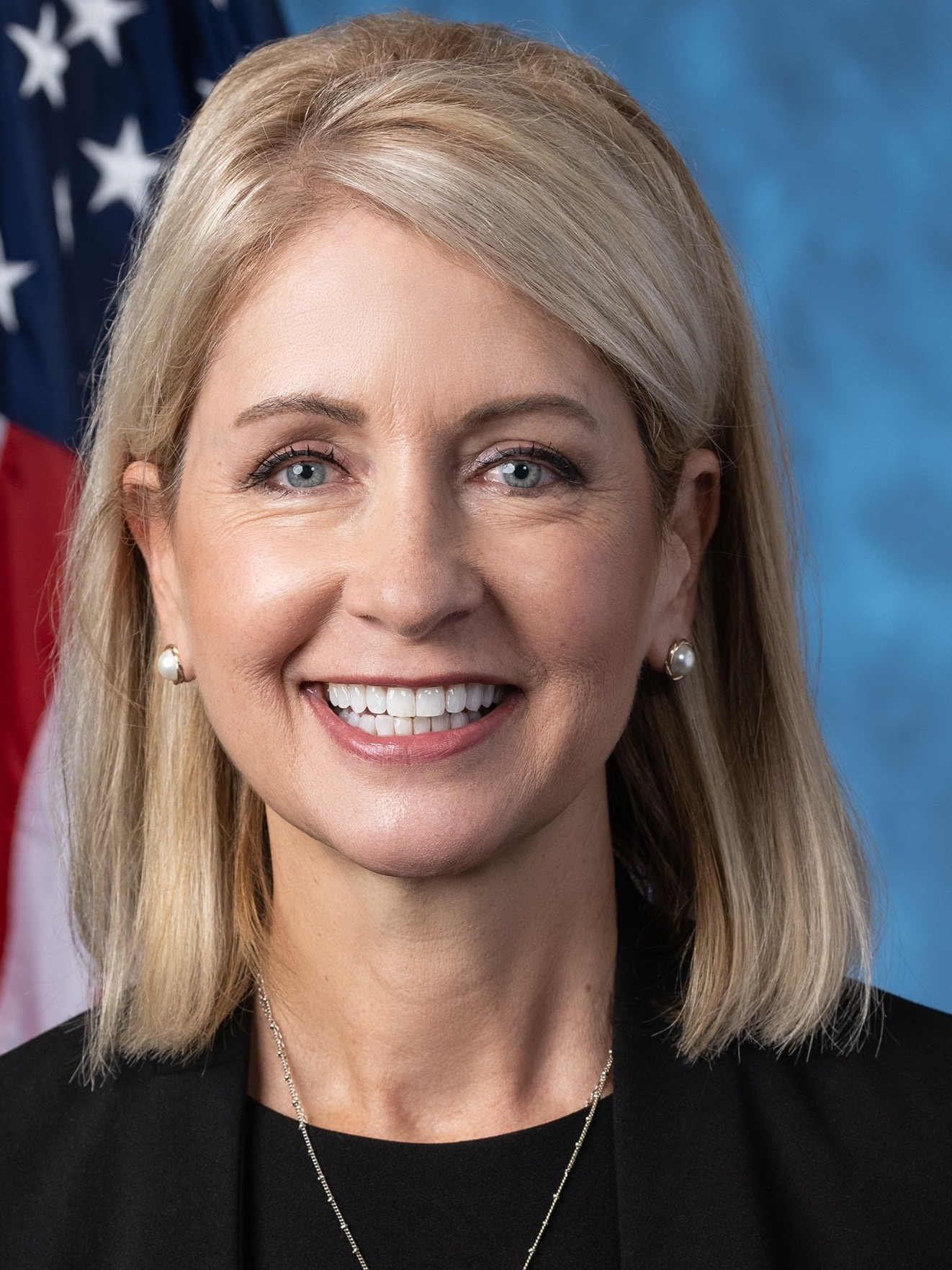

Nominee	Mary Miller	Jennifer Todd
Party	Republican	Democratic
- Miller: 50–60% 60–70% 70–80% 80–90%
Incumbent U.S. Representative
Mary Miller
Republican

The 15th district is based in the rural areas of central Illinois, stretching from the Champaign–Urbana metropolitan area to the eastern St. Louis suburbs and taking in Quincy. The incumbent is Republican Mary Miller, who was re-elected unopposed in 2024.

=== Republican primary ===
==== Nominee ====
- Mary Miller, incumbent U.S. representative

==== Eliminated in primary ====
- Judy Bowlby, lobbyist
- Ryan Tebrugge, IT professional

==== Endorsements ====
Endorsements in bold were made after the primary elections.

Judy Bowlby

Newspapers

- Chicago Tribune (Republican primary only)
Mary Miller

Organizations

- AIPAC
- Freedom Caucus Fund
- **Maggie's List**

==== Fundraising ====
Campaign finance reports as of February 25, 2026
Candidate	Raised	Spent	Cash on hand
Judy Bowlby (R)	$23,953	$19,269	$4,683
Mary Miller (R)	$976,300	$840,153	$782,403
Ryan Tebrugge (R)	$5,469	$3,308	$2,374
Source: Federal Election Commission

==== Results ====
Republican primary results
Party	Candidate	Votes	%
**Republican**	**Mary Miller (incumbent)**	**64,855**	**73.6**
Republican	Ryan Tebrugge	13,045	14.8
Republican	Judy Bowlby	10,194	11.6
Total votes		**88,094**	**100.0**

=== Democratic primary ===
==== Nominee ====
- Jennifer Todd, former nurse

==== Eliminated in primary ====
- Paul Davis, veterinarian
- Kyle Nudo, theater producer
- Randy Raley, retired radio host

==== Endorsements ====
Endorsements in bold were made after the primary elections.

Paul Davis

Newspapers

- Chicago Tribune
Kyle Nudo

Labor unions

- Illinois AFL-CIO
- International Union of Operating Engineers Local 399
Jennifer Todd

Labor unions

- **American Federation of Government Employees**
- Illinois Federation of Teachers

Organizations

- **National Women's Political Caucus**

==== Fundraising ====
Campaign finance reports as of February 25, 2026
Candidate	Raised	Spent	Cash on hand
Paul Davis (D)	$78,103	$74,228	$3,874
Jennifer Todd (D)	$42,424	$40,088	$0
Source: Federal Election Commission

==== Results ====
Democratic primary results
Party	Candidate	Votes	%
**Democratic**	**Jennifer Todd**	**13,708**	**45.7**
Democratic	Paul Davis	10,117	33.7
Democratic	Randy Raley	3,422	11.4
Democratic	Kyle Nudo	2,734	9.1
Total votes		**29,981**	**100.0**

=== General election ===
==== Predictions ====
Source	Ranking	As of
Decision Desk HQ	Safe R	July 14, 2026
The Cook Political Report	Solid R	February 6, 2025
Inside Elections	Solid R	December 5, 2025
Sabato's Crystal Ball	Safe R	July 15, 2025

==== Fundraising ====
Campaign finance reports as of April 25, 2026
Candidate	Raised	Spent	Cash on hand
Mary Miller (R)	$1,104,319	$917,339	$833,236
Jennifer Todd (D)	$57,553	$42,358	$9,224
Source: Federal Election Commission

==== Results ====
2026 Illinois 15th congressional district election
Party	Candidate	Votes	%	±%
Republican	Mary Miller (Incumbent)			
Democratic	Jennifer Todd			
Total votes				

== District 16 ==
2026 Illinois's 16th congressional district election
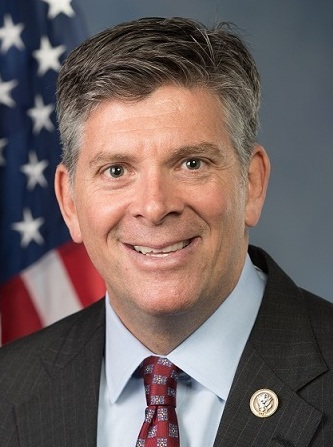

Nominee	Darin LaHood	Paul Nolley
Party	Republican	Democratic
- LaHood: 50–60% 60–70% 70–80% Nolley: 50–60%
Incumbent U.S. Representative
Darin LaHood
Republican

The 16th district is based in the rural areas of northern Illinois. The incumbent is Republican Darin LaHood, who was re-elected unopposed in 2024.

=== Republican primary ===
==== Nominee ====
- Darin LaHood, incumbent U.S. representative

==== Endorsements ====
Darin LaHood

Labor unions

- Illinois Fraternal Order of Police

Organizations

- AIPAC

==== Fundraising ====
Campaign finance reports as of February 25, 2026
Candidate	Raised	Spent	Cash on hand
Darin LaHood (R)	$2,641,274	$1,778,842	$6,383,714
Source: Federal Election Commission

==== Results ====
Republican primary results
Party	Candidate	Votes	%
**Republican**	**Darin LaHood (incumbent)**	**52,914**	**100.0**
Total votes		**52,914**	**100.0**

=== Democratic primary ===
==== Nominee ====
- Paul Nolley, nonprofit executive

==== Endorsements ====
Endorsements in bold were made after the primary elections.

Paul Nolley

U.S. representatives

- Ro Khanna, CA-17 (2017–present)

Labor unions

- **American Federation of Government Employees**
- Illinois AFL-CIO
- International Union of Operating Engineers Local 399
- United Auto Workers

Organizations

- Citizen Action Illinois
- **Progressive Democrats of America**
- Track AIPAC

==== Fundraising ====
Campaign finance reports as of February 25, 2026
Candidate	Raised	Spent	Cash on hand
Paul Nolley (D)	$118,335	$53,580	$64,754
Source: Federal Election Commission

==== Results ====
Democratic primary results
Party	Candidate	Votes	%
**Democratic**	**Paul Nolley**	**38,665**	**100.0**
Total votes		**38,665**	**100.0**

=== General election ===
==== Predictions ====
Source	Ranking	As of
Decision Desk HQ	Safe R	July 14, 2026
The Cook Political Report	Solid R	February 6, 2025
Inside Elections	Solid R	December 5, 2025
Sabato's Crystal Ball	Safe R	July 15, 2025

==== Fundraising ====
Campaign finance reports as of April 25, 2026
Candidate	Raised	Spent	Cash on hand
Darin LaHood (R)	$3,113,808	$1,952,628	$6,682,463
Paul Nolley (D)	$236,891	$77,336	$159,555
Source: Federal Election Commission

==== Results ====
2026 Illinois 16th congressional district election
Party	Candidate	Votes	%	±%
Republican	Darin LaHood (Incumbent)			
Democratic	Paul Nolley			
Total votes				

== District 17 ==
2026 Illinois's 17th congressional district election
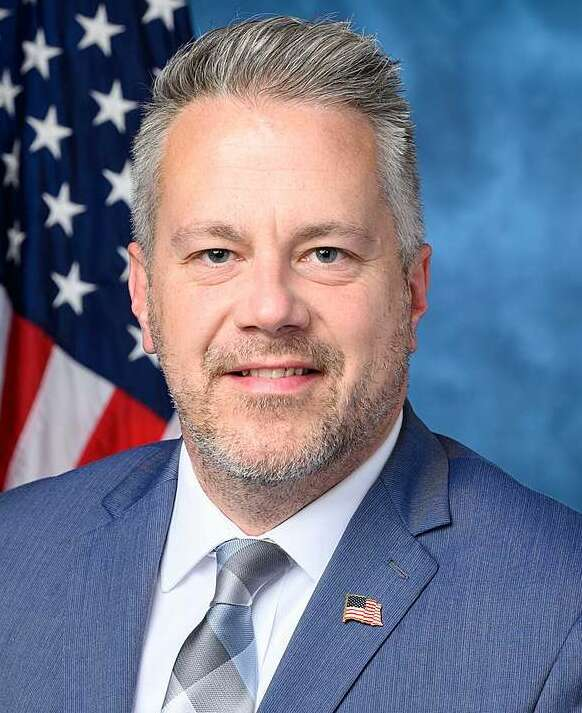

Nominee	Eric Sorensen	Dillan Vancil
Party	Democratic	Republican
- Sorensen: 50–60% 60–70% 70–80% Vancil: 50–60% 60–70%
Incumbent U.S. Representative
Eric Sorensen
Democratic

The 17th district is based in north-central Illinois, stretching from Rockford to the Quad Cities metropolitan area to Bloomington, also taking in Peoria. The incumbent is Democrat Eric Sorensen, who was elected with 54.4% of the vote in 2024.

=== Democratic primary ===
==== Nominee ====
- Eric Sorensen, incumbent U.S. representative

==== Endorsements ====
Endorsements in bold were made after the primary elections.

Eric Sorensen

Labor unions

- American Federation of Government Employees
- Illinois AFL-CIO
- International Union of Operating Engineers Locals 150 and 399
- SEIU Healthcare
- SEIU Illinois State Council

Organizations

- 314 Action
- AIPAC
- Bend the Arc
- Democratic Majority for Israel
- **Giffords**
- Jewish Democratic Council of America
- Joint Action Committee for Political Affairs
- J Street
- LGBTQ+ Victory Fund
- Planned Parenthood Action Fund

==== Fundraising ====
Campaign finance reports as of February 25, 2026
Candidate	Raised	Spent	Cash on hand
Eric Sorensen (D)	$1,571,205	$723,755	$960,243
Source: Federal Election Commission

==== Results ====
Democratic primary results
Party	Candidate	Votes	%
**Democratic**	**Eric Sorensen (incumbent)**	**47,743**	**100.0**
Total votes		**47,743**	**100.0**

=== Republican primary ===
==== Nominee ====
- Dillan Vancil, coffee shop owner

==== Eliminated in primary ====
- Julie Bickelhaupt, chair of the Carroll County Board

==== Endorsements ====
Dillan Vancil

Organizations

- Log Cabin Republicans

Newspapers

- Chicago Tribune

==== Fundraising ====
Campaign finance reports as of February 25, 2026
Candidate	Raised	Spent	Cash on hand
Julie Bickelhaupt (R)	$75,288	$25,047	$50,241
Dillan Vancil (R)	$177,204	$156,318	$41,207
Source: Federal Election Commission

==== Results ====
Republican primary results
Party	Candidate	Votes	%
**Republican**	**Dillan Vancil**	**19,535**	**58.4**
Republican	Julie Bickelhaupt	13,903	41.6
Total votes		**33,438**	**100.0**

=== General election ===
==== Predictions ====
Source	Ranking	As of
Decision Desk HQ	Safe D	October 30, 2026
The Cook Political Report	Solid D	January 15, 2026
Inside Elections	Solid D	December 5, 2025
Sabato's Crystal Ball	Safe D	March 26, 2026

==== Fundraising ====
Campaign finance reports as of April 25, 2026
Candidate	Raised	Spent	Cash on hand
Eric Sorensen (D)	$1,850,945	$784,997	$1,178,742
Dillan Vancil (R)	$196,391	$202,712	$14,001
Source: Federal Election Commission

==== Results ====
2026 Illinois 17th congressional district election
Party	Candidate	Votes	%	±%
Democratic	Eric Sorensen (Incumbent)			
Republican	Dillan Vancil			
Total votes				

== See also ==
- 2026 United States House of Representatives elections

== Notes ==
Partisan clients
