= Lauren Beth Gash =

American lawyer and politician

Member of the Illinois House of Representatives from the 60th district
- In office January 13, 1993 – January 11, 2001
- Preceded by: William E. Peterson
- Succeeded by: Karen May

Personal details
- Born: June 11, 1960 (age 66) Summit, New Jersey, U.S.
- Party: Democratic
- Spouse: Gregg Garmisa
- Children: 2
- Education: Clark University (BA); Georgetown University (JD)
- Profession: Politician, lawyer

Lauren Beth Gash (born June 11, 1960) is an American lawyer and Democratic Party politician who served in the Illinois House of Representatives from 1993 to 2001. She was the Democratic nominee for Congress in the 10th congressional district of Illinois in 2000, but was narrowly defeated by Republican Mark Kirk.

Born in Summit, New Jersey, and raised in Berkeley Heights, New Jersey, Gash received her bachelor's degree in psychology from Clark University and her J.D. degree from Georgetown University Law Center. Gash is admitted to the Illinois bar and lives in Highland Park, Illinois. Gash is involved with the Democratic Party. Gash served in the Illinois House of Representatives from 1993 to 2001. Gash has a general practice, with a focus on not-for-profit organizations, civil rights, election law and public policy.

== Career ==
Gash has served as a Commissioner with the Illinois Human Rights Commission. Prior to that, she served four terms in the Illinois House of Representatives, where she chaired the Judiciary Committee. She was also vice-chair of the Elections and Campaign Reform Committee. Gash previously worked in Washington, D.C., and has served on the staffs of U.S. Senators Alan Dixon and Paul Simon.

She is the founding chair of the Tenth Congressional District Democrats (Tenth Dems), a grassroots organization dedicated to building Democratic infrastructure in Illinois's 10th congressional district, and chair of Lake County Democrats. Gash was a member of the Electoral College in 2008, 2012 and 2016. She was an elected delegate to the Democratic National Convention several times.

Gash has served on numerous not-for-profit boards, including the League of Women Voters, PTA and the Anti-Defamation League. She is a former volunteer attorney at Prairie State Legal Services.

Gash regularly organizes Election Protection teams, CLE (continuing legal education) seminars, job interview workshops, expungement and sealing events with volunteer attorneys, and an annual student Poetry and Prose contest.

== Personal life and education ==
Gash lives in Highland Park and is married to Gregg Garmisa. They have two adult children – Sarah, who uses her MBA and Master of Public Policy degrees to work toward social justice with not-for-profit organizations, and Ben, who serves as the communications director for U.S. Senator Tammy Duckworth in Washington, D.C.

Gash holds a Juris Doctor degree from Georgetown University Law Center, where she served as associate editor of the American Criminal Law Review. As an undergraduate at Clark University, she majored in psychology. She is Jewish.
