= John Minarcik =

- Born: 1947 (age 78–79); United States
- Education: Loyola University of Chicago, University of Illinois, Northwestern University
- Known for: Global Online Medical School Pathology Course, Shotgun Histology
- Scientific career
- Fields: Medicine, Pathologist
- Workplaces: International American University

Professor John R. Minarcik (/mɪˈnɑːrsɪk/ min-AR-sik) is an American pathologist, creator of the Global Online Medical School Pathology Course. He is the author of Shotgun histology and Histopathology. Minarcik is professor of pathology at the International American University, Visiting Clinical Professor of Pathology, American University of Antigua Medical School, Professor of Pathology at the Destiny University School of Medicine Visiting Professor of Pathology at the University of Medicine and Health Sciences, St. Kitts, and served as a Workshop Director at the ASCP World Congress XXVI, Las Vegas Nevada, October 20, 2011, Teach An Entire Global Pathology Course, Lecture and Lab, Online!
