= International American University =

Private, for-profit university in California

Coordinates: 34.0611°N 118.2987°W

- Type: Private for-profit university
- Established: 2005
- Location: Los Angeles, California, United States
- Website: www.iaula.edu

International American University (IAU) is a private for-profit university in Palmdale and Los Angeles, California. It started operations in 2005 in Los Angeles, as the Management Institute of America, Inc.

== History ==
IAU started operations in 2005 in Los Angeles as the Management Institute of America. It currently operates from facilities in Palmdale, California and Los Angeles, California. According to its newsletter, the university received its initial approval for the name change on July 6, 2006, and conducted its first graduation ceremony in Malaysia on April 1, 2007. This was only 8 months after its temporary approval. During its commencement ceremony, 85 students received their degrees.

March 2009: IAU received its approval by the United States Immigration and Customs Enforcement (ICE) of the Department of Homeland Security (DHS) to accept and enroll foreign, non-immigrant F-1 students for academic degrees.

January 2008: IAU relocated its administrative office from Los Angeles to Palmdale, CA. IAU establishes CAS Academy, a department under the School of Business and Technology.

September 2006: Management Institute of America, Inc. legally changed its name to the International American University.

July 2006: Management Institute of America, Inc sought California State approval to legally change its name to the International American University (IAU) in 2006.

August 2005: Management Institute of America, Inc. is incorporated in the State of California as a private proprietary corporation, duly formed and organized under the laws and regulations of the Secretary of State for the State of California.

== Approval and Accreditation ==
IAU is approved to operate as a private postsecondary educational institution in the State of California by the Bureau for Private Postsecondary Education (BPPE).

According to its catalog and its website, IAU offers certificate, associate, bachelor's, masters, and doctoral degree programs. It is accredited by the Transnational Association of Christian Colleges and Schools. IAU has entered into an agreement with Harvard Business School (HBS) Online. This collaboration provides IAU students the opportunity to take courses from Harvard through IAU and receive credit.
