= Karen May =

American politician from Illinois (born 1944)

Member of the Illinois House of Representatives from the 58th district
- In office 2001–2012
- Succeeded by: Scott Drury

Personal details
- Born: August 2, 1944 (age 82) Highland Park, Illinois
- Party: Democratic
- Spouse: Morton May

Karen May (born 1944) is a former Democratic member of the Illinois House of Representatives for the 58th District, serving from 2001 to 2012. The district includes parts of Bannockburn, Deerfield, Glencoe, Highland Park, Highwood, Lake Bluff, Lake Forest, Northbrook, and Riverwoods.

May received her Bachelor of Arts in Communication from the University of Illinois at Urbana-Champaign. She and her husband live in Highland Park where they brought up their two children. A Chicago Tribune article in 2010 cited May as the third most frequent flyer on state owned aircraft in the Illinois General Assembly. May's explanation for her use of state aviation was that driving is painful for her previously injured neck and back. The "controversial" nature of air travel, according to the same article, is that the Illinois Auditor General has determined that their cost to the taxpayers is higher than other forms of transportation.

As of 2019, May is a member of the Statewide Compliance Advisory Panel. The panel renders advisory opinions on the effectiveness of SBEAP and difficulties encountered by small businesses as required by Section 507 of the 1990 Clean Air Act.
