= Dennis Deer =

Cook County Commissioner (1972–2024)

Member of the Cook County Board of Commissioners from the 2nd district
- In office July 13, 2017 – June 23, 2024
- Preceded by: Robert Steele
- Succeeded by: Michael Scott Jr.

Personal details
- Born: August 7, 1972 Chicago, Illinois, U.S.
- Died: June 23, 2024 (aged 51)
- Party: Democratic
- Spouse: Barbara Deer
- Children: 3
- Education: Jackson State University (BA, MS); Agape Theological Institute (PhD)
- Website: Cook County Board of Commissioners website

Dennis Deer (August 7, 1972 – June 23, 2024) was an American politician who served as the Cook County Commissioner for the 2nd district from 2017 until his death. He represented many neighborhoods in Chicago, including portions of the Loop, Near West Side, Near South Side, North Lawndale, Englewood, and Washington Park community areas. He was a member of the Democratic Party.

== Early life and career ==
Deer was born on August 7, 1972, and raised in the North Lawndale neighborhood of Chicago. He attended Collins High School in Chicago. After high school, he left the Chicago area to attend Jackson State University and obtained his Bachelor of Science in elementary/special education and Master of Science in rehabilitation psychology. Deer became interested in studying behavioral health after witnessing a murder at the age of 10 and suffering from post-traumatic stress disorder. He later obtained his Ph.D. in Christian psychology from Agape Theological Institute. He also earned certifications as a Licensed Clinical Professional Counselor, forensic counselor, rehabilitation counselor, corrective thinking therapist, and Illinois law enforcement standards and training instructor.

Deer returned to Chicago after university and founded Deer Rehabilitation Services, a therapy services provider in North Lawndale with a specialty in rehabilitating ex-offenders. He also co-founded and served on the executive committee of the North Lawndale Community Coordinating Council, a group of community stakeholders working to guide comprehensive planning and implementation in North Lawndale. In his capacity as president of Deer Rehabilitation Services, Deer graduated from the Goldman Sachs 10,000 Small Businesses program and the Chicago Urban League nextONE business acceleration program.

In 2018, Deer became the Vice-President of Organizational Health and Management for the Lawndale Christian Legal Center, a nonprofit provider of holistic legal services to people 24 years or younger that utilizes restorative justice. As of 2020, Deer was also a landlord.

== Political career ==
=== Early political involvement ===
In 2003, Deer ran for 24th ward Alderman in Chicago against two-term incumbent, Michael Chandler. After failing to challenge the nomination papers of Chandler, Deer went on to come in third place behind Alderman Chandler and Joe Ann Bradley, a co-founder of Citizen's Action Group which worked towards eliminating prostitution in North Lawndale.

In 2007, Deer filed to run for 24th ward Democratic Committeeman in the 2008 primary, but withdrew as a candidate after facing a challenge to his nominating papers.

Deer served as the president of County Commissioner Robert Steele's fundraising committee until Steele's death in 2017 and considered Steele to be a mentor. He was also the chairman of an anti-violence task force that Steele's 2nd County District Community Advisory Council created with U.S. Representative Danny K. Davis.

=== 2017 appointment ===
2nd district Cook County Commissioner Robert Steele died on June 19, 2017, due to complications related to diabetes. On July 13, 2017, a committee chaired by 24th ward Alderman and Democratic Committeeman, Michael Scott Jr., and made up of the Chicago Democratic ward committeepeople for all wards that made up the 2nd district was convened to select Steele's replacement to fill the rest of his term. Votes for the successor were weighted based on how many constituents of each ward committeeperson were also a constituent of the 2nd district.

Deer and 12 other candidates applied, including 20th ward Democratic Committeeman Kevin Bailey (a member of the selection committee), Reyahd Kazmi (the husband of City Clerk Anna M. Valencia), and State Representative and future City Treasurer Melissa Conyears. Conyears was also the wife of a selection committee member, 28th ward Alderman and Democratic Committeeman Jason Ervin. After appearing as a candidate, Conyears ultimately left prior to interviewing.

Deer received endorsements from the chairman of the replacement committee, Alderman Scott Jr., and from the Steele family. The Steele family endorsement carried weight as Robert Steele had held the seat since 2006 and before that his mother, Bobbie L. Steele, held the seat from 1986–2006. Deer won over the committee as a life-long community member who could build on the work of Robert Steele. As the former president of Steele's fundraising committee, he said "We already know how to raise money. We know how to win elections and we're ready to hit ground running." After three rounds of voting, Deer won the fourth and final round unanimously.

=== 2018 campaign ===
In 2018, Deer ran to be elected to his first full term as 2nd district Cook County Commissioner. Deer won the Democratic nomination in the March 20 Democratic primary, in which he faced four opponents. Deer stated that his priorities were "Fiscal Responsibility, Economic Development, Healthcare, and Public Safety." His opponents included Eddie Johnson III, a Chicago Public Schools educator, Paul J. Montes II, attorney and entrepreneur, Lupe Aguirre, a Chicago police officer and attorney, and Darryl D. Smith, community volunteer. During the primary campaign, Deer was endorsed by U.S. Representative Danny Davis, Alderman Michael Scott Jr., Alderman David Moore, former Cook County Board President and 2nd district Commissioner Bobbie Steele, the Chicago Sun-Times and the Chicago Tribune.

After winning the primary, Deer won the November 6, 2018, general election unopposed. He was sworn in for his first full term on December 3, 2018.

== Cook County Commissioner ==
=== Tenure ===
==== 2017 sweetened beverage tax repeal ====
Shortly after Deer took office, the Board of Commissioners considered the repeal of the controversial penny-an-ounce tax on sugar- and artificially sweetened beverages that was supported by President of the Cook County Board of Commissioners Toni Preckwinkle. After initially supporting the tax at the time of his appointment, Deer ultimately voted for the successful repeal of the tax on October 11, 2017.

==== Racial justice ====
On July 25, 2019, the Board of Commissioners passed Deer's resolution declaring racism and racial inequalities a public health crisis in Cook County. The resolution was intended to encourage growth in public health support networks to work towards decreases in racial disparities in health outcomes. Supporters of the bill believed it was important since communities of color are disproportionately affected by things such as exposure to lead, poor air quality, a lack of safe spaces, and inadequate health education.

On July 7, 2020, Deer along with fellow Commissioners Deborah Sims, Stanley Moore, Brandon Johnson, Bill Lowry and Donna Miller released a statement calling for passage of the Justice for Black Lives resolution. In referring to the changes demanded by recent Black Lives Matter protests the statement said, "As Black members of the Cook County Board we are determined to be the catalyst for that transformation in our county and beyond. The first step in that process is passage of the Justice for Black Lives Resolution, which would seek to redirect funds from our criminal justice system into systems and programs that support human needs and promote the health and welfare of the Black community." The non-binding resolution passed in a 15–1 vote on July 30, 2020. In July 2020, Commissioners Deer and Moore withdrew their separate resolutions and combined their resolutions to make Juneteenth a holiday in Cook County. The measure was unanimously passed in December 2020.

==== 2020 census ====
Deer served as one of the Vice-Chairs of the Cook County Complete Count Census Commission for the 2020 United States Census. In this capacity, he worked to help ensure everyone in Cook County was properly counted to make sure Cook County receives proper legislative representation and government funding in areas such as social services and infrastructure. On August 18, 2020, Deer co-hosted an event in Englewood giving out prizes to those who filled out the census with Alderman Stephanie Coleman and various local organizations.

==== Housing ====
Deer supported the Just Housing Amendment that was passed by the Board of Commissioners on April 25, 2019, and went into effect January 1, 2020. The amendment prohibited landlords from denying housing applications based on arrest records or convictions that are more than 3 years old and required an individualized assessment of convictions less than 3 years old for otherwise qualified applicants. Deer decided he wanted to champion this issue as someone who is both a landlord and works with ex-incarcerated men and women. He stated, "There's no room for double jeopardy. People should not be required to pay over and over and over again for a crime they committed when they were 19."

=== Committee assignments ===
As a member of the Cook County Board of Commissioners, Deer served on multiple committees of both the Board of Commissioners and the Forest Preserve District Board.

==== Cook County Board of Commissioners committee memberships ====
- Asset Management
- Business and Economic Development
- Criminal Justice
- Contract Compliance
- Emergency Management and Regional Security
- Environment and Sustainability (Chairman)
- Finance
- Health and Hospitals (Chairman)
- Human Relations (Chairman)
- Legislation and Intergovernmental Relations
- Rules and Administration
- Technology and Innovation
- Transportation
- Veterans
- Zoning and Building

==== Cook County Forest Preserve District Board committee memberships ====
- Botanic Garden
- Capital Development
- Contract Compliance
- Environment and Sustainability (Vice Chairman)
- Finance (Vice Chairman)
- Legislation and Intergovernmental Relations
- Real Estate
- Recreation
- Rules
- Zoological

== Personal life ==
Deer and his wife, Barbara, had three children. He was also a member of Omega Psi Phi fraternity.

=== Health and death ===
Deer had situs inversus, meaning his visceral organs were reversed from their normal locations. In 2022, he was diagnosed with COVID-19, and experienced a number of health complications around this time, including polymyositis and interstitial lung disease. The following year, he underwent a double lung transplant.

Deer died on June 23, 2024, at the age of 51. Former Alderman Michael Scott Jr. was appointed to succeed him.

== Electoral history ==
24th Ward Chicago Alderman General Election, 2003
Party	Candidate	Votes	%
Nonpartisan	Michael D. Chandler	4,498	52.41
Nonpartisan	Joe Ann Bradley	1,550	18.06
Nonpartisan	Dennis Deer	1,166	13.58
Nonpartisan	Shirley A. Johnson	675	7.86
Nonpartisan	Bruce L. Jackson	475	5.53
Nonpartisan	Michael Outley	219	2.55
Total votes		8,583	100

2nd District Cook County Commissioner Democratic Primary, 2018
Party	Candidate	Votes	%
Democratic	Dennis Deer	11,522	32.59
Democratic	Eddie Johnson III	7,482	21.16
Democratic	Darryl D. Smith	6,824	19.30
Democratic	Lupe Aguirre	5,353	15.15
Democratic	Paul J. Montes II	3,976	11.25
Democratic	Write-in candidates	196	0.55
Total votes		35,353	100

2nd District Cook County Commissioner Election, 2018
Party	Candidate	Votes	%
Democratic	Dennis Deer	78,380	100.00
Total votes		78,380	100
