= Cook County Board of Commissioners =

Unicameral legislature of Cook County, Illinois

Type
- Type: Unicameral

Leadership
- President: Toni Preckwinkle since December 6, 2010

Structure
- Seats: 17
- Political groups: Majority: Democratic (16); Minority: Republican (1)
- Length of term: 4 years

Elections
- Last election: 2022
- Next election: 2026

Meeting place
- City Hall-County Building; 118 N Clark St; Chicago, Illinois, U.S.

Website
- cookcountyil.gov

The Cook County Board of Commissioners is a legislative body made up of 17 commissioners who are elected by district, and a president who is elected county-wide, all for four-year terms. Cook County is the United States' second most populous county, with a population of 5.2 million residents, and the city of Chicago as the county seat. The county board sets policy and laws for the county regarding property, public health services, public safety, and maintenance of county highways. It is presided over by its president and the county's chief executive, currently Toni Preckwinkle.

The commissioners, president, county clerk (who serves as clerk of the board) and county treasurer, hold the same offices ex officio on the separate governmental taxing body, the Cook County Forest Preserve District Board of Commissioners.

== History ==
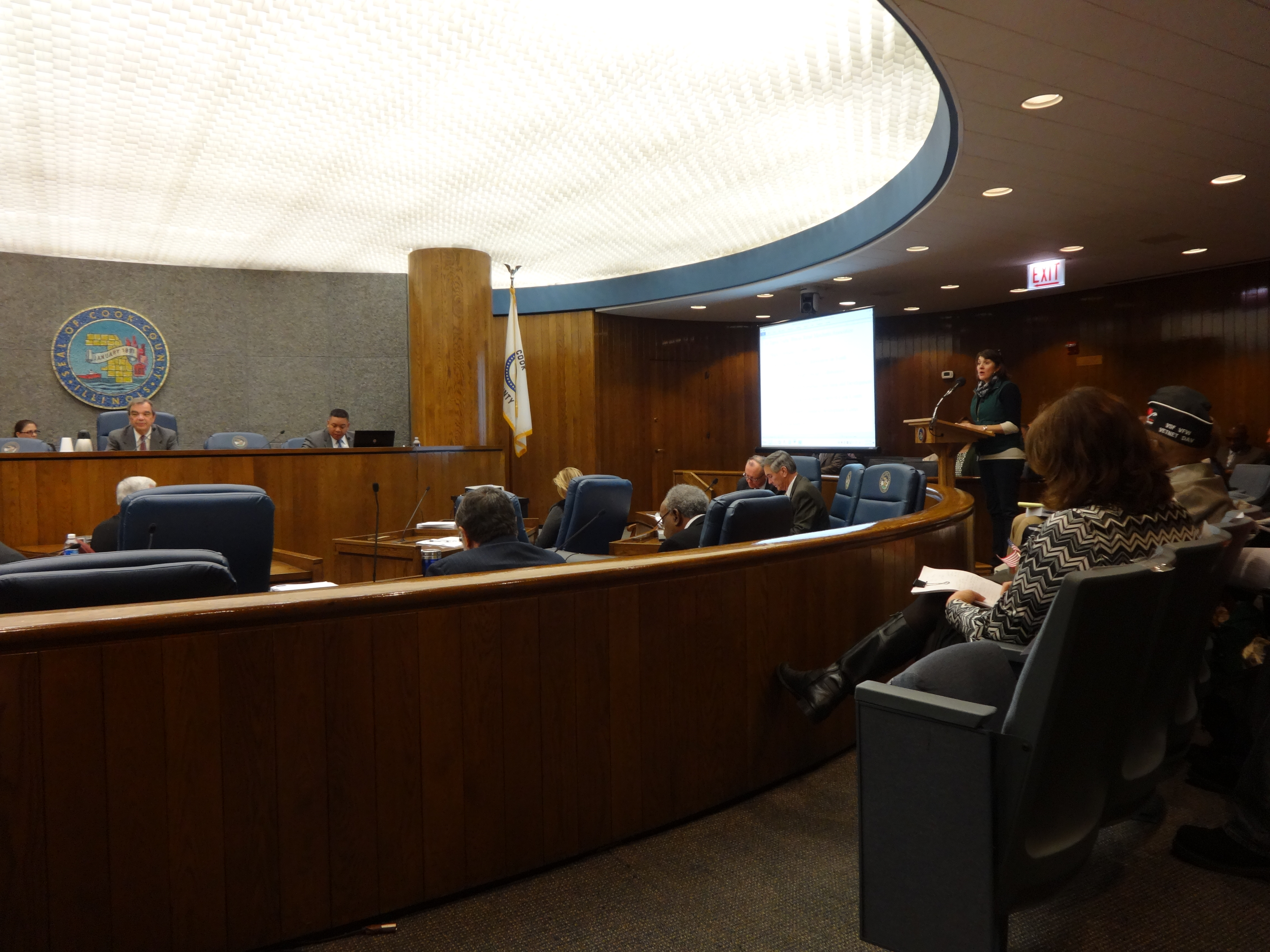
October 8, 2013 meeting of the Cook County Board of Commissioners in the City Hall-County Building

Until 1870, Cook County had been governed under the "township supervisor" system, under which each Chicago ward elected a supervisor, and each township elected one or more as well depending on population, creating a board of 50 members, less than half from Chicago. In the wake of a scandal involving then board chairman J. J. Kearney (who was eventually unseated and expelled from the board), the new commission was created pursuant to an amendment to the state constitution, initially with ten Chicago commissioners elected from groups of wards within the city, and five members elected from groups of townships outside the city, presided over by a chairman elected by the board from among their own number. The commissioners were elected for three-year terms, on a staggered basis. The first meeting of the new board took place December 4, 1871; they elected businessman and Civil War general Julius White of Evanston as their chairman.

=== Transition to single-member constituencies ===
The 1870 version of the Illinois Constitution had established the Board of Commissioners as having fifteen members in total, with ten representing the municipal boundaries of City of Chicago and five from the suburban portions of the county. The separation of the seats into ones elected from the city and ones elected from the suburban county was meant to prevent the city from dominating county board elections, as the suburbs had far less overall population than the city in 1870. In 1870, the city had approximately two-thirds of the county's population, hence why they were given two-thirds of the seats. By the 1970s, the suburban share of the county's population was significantly higher. However, since the 1870 constitution including no clause for county reapportionment, the number of suburban seats had remained stagnant since 1870 causing malapportionment.

In light of the malapportionment concerns, at the 1970 Constitutional Convention (which produced the current constitution of the state, ultimately ratified in December 1970), county board members Carl R. Hansen and Floyd Fulle presented a proposal that the new constitution expand the board initially from fifteen to twenty-one members (13 city seats, 8 suburban seats) with reapportionment of those twenty-one seats after every decennial United States Census. Hansen's rationale for increasing the size of the body was that, he believed, it would create a "more workable legislative body" able to have commissioners carry-out the workload of five or six major committees.

Ultimately, the constitutional convention instead approved a different proposal, which permitted the board to (by passing an ordinance) abolish its two multi-member districts (one city, one suburban), and instead divide itself into single-member districts which could straddle across the city's municipal boundaries (allowing some seats to include both suburban and city constituents). Some suburban Cook County delegates, however, expressed concern that a switch to single-member districts could ultimately weaken Republican representation by allowing the Democratic majority to gerrymander the seats. One Republican suburban Cook County delegate, Joseph Tescon, sought to add language that would only allow a switch to single-member districts to occur if first approved by voters in a countywide referendum, but the convention's delegates voted 54–31 to reject Tescon's clause. A switch to single-member constituencies ultimately did not occur until the 1990s.

== Elections ==
The board's seventeen commissioners are elected from individual constituencies for four year terms, with elections for all constituencies held during United States midterm elections. Its president is elected at-large to a four-year term in elections held during United States midterm elections.

Up through 1990, commissioners were elected through two sets of elections, one held in Chicago to elect ten commissioners and another held in suburban Cook County to elect the remaining seven commissioners. In 1994, the board switched to having commissioners elected from individual constituencies.

== Commissioners ==
Graph of the progression of the partisan seat share won at each election since 1986

=== Current ===
This is a list of the Cook County Commissioners in order by district. This list is current as of December 2022.

District	Commissioner	Residence	Start	Party
President (at large)	Toni Preckwinkle	Chicago	2010	Democratic
1	Tara Stamps	Chicago	2023	Democratic
2	Michael Scott Jr.	Chicago	2024	Democratic
3	Bill Lowry	Chicago	2018	Democratic
4	Stanley Moore	Chicago	2013	Democratic
5	Kisha McCaskill	Harvey	2025	Democratic
6	Donna Miller	Lynwood	2018	Democratic
7	Alma Anaya	Chicago	2018	Democratic
8	Jessica Vasquez	Chicago	2025	Democratic
9	Maggie Trevor	Rolling Meadows	2022	Democratic
10	Bridget Gainer	Chicago	2009	Democratic
11	John Daley	Chicago	1992	Democratic
12	Bridget Degnen	Chicago	2018	Democratic
13	Josina Morita	Skokie	2022	Democratic
14	Scott Britton	Glenview	2018	Democratic
15	Kevin Morrison	Mount Prospect	2018	Democratic
16	Frank Aguilar	Cicero	2020	Democratic
17	Sean Morrison	Palos Park	2015	Republican

=== Past ===
==== Before 1994 ====
Individuals who, before 1994, served as president of the Cook County Board of Commissioners included J. Frank Aldrich, Edward J. Brundage, Anton Cermak, George Dunne, Richard B. Ogilvie, Richard Phelan, Dan Ryan Jr. Charles C. P. Holden, and Seymour Simon. The first county board chairman (a role which preceded the creation of the president position) was Julius White.

Individuals who served as commissioners before the move to individual constituencies in 1994 included George Marquis Bogue, Jerry Butler, Carl R. Chindblom, Marco Domico, Martin Emerich, Carter Harrison III, John Humphrey, John Jones, Walter J. LaBuy, Lillian Piotrowski, Francis Cornwall Sherman, Seymour Simon, Horace M. Singer, Alanson Sweet, and William Hale Thompson. Others included suburban members Allan C. Carr, Carl R. Hansen, Herb Schumann; and Chicago members Charles Bernardini, Charles S. Bonk, Jerry Butler, John P. Daley, Danny K. Davis, Ted Lechowicz, Mary McEnerney, Maria Pappas, Oscar Stanton De Priest, Harry H. Semrow, and Bobbie L. Steele.

==== Since 1994 ====
Members serving (by term)
Term	Members	Party balance
1994–1998	President: John Stroger (D); 1st district: Danny Davis (D); 2nd district: Bobbie L. Steele (D); 3rd district: Jerry Butler (D); 4th district: John Stroger (D); 5th district: Deborah Sims (D); 6th district: Barclay "Bud" Fleming (R); 7th district: Joseph Mario Moreno (D); 8th district: Roberto Maldonado (D); 9th district: Peter N. Silvestri (R); 10th district: Maria Pappas (D); 11th district: John P. Daley (D); 12th district: Ted Lechowicz (D); 13th district: Calvin Sutker (D); 14th district: Richard Seibel (R); 15th district: Carl R. Hansen (R); 16th district: Allan C. Carr (R); 17th district: Herb Schumann (R)	President: Democrat; Commissioners: 11 (D), 6 (R)
1998–2002	President: John Stroger (D); 1st district: Danny Davis (D) through Jan. 1999; Darlena Williams–Burnett (D) beginning in 1999; 2nd district: Bobbie L. Steele (D); 3rd district: Jerry Butler (D); 4th district: John Stroger (D); 5th district: Deborah Sims (D); 6h district: William Moran (D); 7th district: Joseph Mario Moreno (D); 8th district: Roberto Maldonado (D); 9th district: Peter N. Silvestri (R); 10th district: Mike Quigley (D); 11th district: John P. Daley (D); 12th district: Ted Lechowicz (D); 13th district: Calvin Sutker (D); 14th district: Gregg Goslin (R); 15th district: Carl R. Hansen (R); 16th district: Allan C. Carr (R); 17th district: Herb Schumann (R)	President: Democrat; Commissioners: 12 (D), 5 (R)
2002–2006	President: John Stroger (D) through Aug. 2006; Bobbie L. Steele (D) beginning in Aug. 2006; 1st district: Earlean Collins (D); 2nd district: Bobbie L. Steele (D); 3rd district: Jerry Butler (D); 4th district: John Stroger (D) through Nov. 2006; William Beavers (D) beginning in Nov. 2006; 5th district: Deborah Sims (D); 6th district: Joan Patricia Murphy (D); 7th district: Joseph Mario Moreno (D); 8th district: Roberto Maldonado (D); 9th district: Peter N. Silvestri (R); 10th district: Mike Quigley (D); 11th district: John P. Daley (D); 12th district: Forrest Claypool (D); 13th district: Larry Suffredin (D); 15th district: Gregg Goslin (R); 15th district: Carl R. Hansen (R); 16th district: Tony Peraica (R); 17th district: Elizabeth Ann Doody Gorman (R)	President: Democrat; Commissioners: 12 (D), 5 (R)
2006–2010	President: Todd Stroger; 1st district: Earlean Collins (D); 2nd district: Robert Steele (D); 3rd district: Jerry Butler (D); 4th district: William Beavers (D); 5th district: Deborah Sims (D); 6th district: Joan Patricia Murphy (D); 7th district: Joseph Mario Moreno (D); 8th district: Roberto Maldonado (D) through Aug. 2009; Edwin Reyes (D) since Aug. 2009; 9th district: Peter N. Silvestri (R); 10th district: Mike Quigley (D) through Apr. 2009; Bridget Gainer (D) since Apr. 2009; 11th district: John P. Daley (D); 12th district: Forrest Claypool (D); 13th district:Larry Suffredin(D); 14th district: Gregg Goslin (R); 15th district: Tim Schneider (R); 16th district: Tony Peraica (R); 17th district: Elizabeth Ann Doody Gorman (R)	President: Democrat; Commissioners: 12 (D), 5 (R)
2010–2014	President: Toni Preckwinkle (D); 1st district: Earlean Collins (D); 2nd district: Robert Steele (D); 3rd district: Jerry Butler (D); 4th district: William Beavers (D) through Mar. 2013; Stanley Moore (D) beginning in Apr. 2013; 5th district: Deborah Sims (D); 6th district: Joan Patricia Murphy (D); 7th district: Chuy García (D); 8th district: Edwin Reyes (D); 9th district: Peter N. Silvestri (R); 10th district: Bridget Gainer (D); 11th district: John P. Daley (D); 12th district: John Fritchey (D); 13th district: Larry Suffredin (D); 14th district: Gregg Goslin (R); 15th district: Tim Schneider (R); 16th district: Jeff Tobolski (D); 17th district: Elizabeth Ann Doody Gorman (R)	President: Democrat; Commissioners: 13 (D), 4 (R)
2014–2018	President: Toni Preckwinkle (D); 1st district: Richard Boykin (D); 2nd district: Robert Steele (D) through June 2017; Dennis Deer (D) beginning in July 2017; 3rd district: Jerry Butler (D); 4th district: Stanley Moore (D); 5th district: Deborah Sims (D); 6th district: Joan Patricia Murphy (D) through Sep. 2016; Edward Moody (D) beginning in Oct. 2016; 7th district: Chuy García (D); 8th district: Luis Arroyo Jr. (D); 9th district: Peter N. Silvestri (R); 10th district: Bridget Gainer (D); 11th district: John P. Daley (D); 12th district: John Fritchey (D); 13th district: Larry Suffredin (D); 14th district: Gregg Goslin (R); 15th district: Tim Schneider (R); 16th district: Jeff Tobolski (D); 17th district: Elizabeth Ann Doody Gorman (R) through July 2015; Sean M. Morrison (R) beginning in July 2015	President: Democrat; Commissioners: 13 (D), 4 (R)
2018–2022	President: Toni Preckwinkle (D); 1st district: Brandon Johnson (D); 2nd district: Dennis Deer (D); 3rd district: Bill Lowry (D); 4th district: Stanley Moore (D); 5th district: Deborah Sims (D); 6th district: Donna Miller (D); 7th district: Alma E. Anya (D); 8th district: Luis Arroyo Jr. (D); 9th district: Peter N. Silvestri (R); 10th district: Bridget Gainer (D); 11th district: John P. Daley (D); 12th district: Bridget Degenen (D); 13th district: Larry Suffredin (D); 14th district: Scott R. Britton (D); 15th district: Kevin B. Morrison (D); 16th district: Jeff Tobolski (D) until Mar. 2020; Frank Aguilar (D) since Apr. 2020; 17th district: Sean M. Morrison (R)	President: Democrat; Commissioners: 15 (D), 2 (R)
2022–present	President: Toni Preckwinkle (D); 1st district: Brandon Johnson (D) through May 2023; Tara Stamps (D) beginning in June 2023; 2nd district: Dennis Deer (D) through July 2024; Michael Scott Jr. beginning in July 2024; 3rd district: Bill Lowry (D); 4th district: Stanley Moore (D); 5th district: Monica Gordon (D) through January 2025; Kisha McCaskill beginning in January 2025; 6th district: Donna Miller (D); 7th district: Alma E. Anya (D); 8th district: Anthony Quezada (D) through May 2025; Jessica Vasquez beginning in May 2025; 9th district: Maggie Tevor (D); 10th district: Bridget Gainer (D); 11th district: John P. Daley (D); 12th district: Bridget Degenen (D); 13th district: Josina Morita (D); 14th district: Scott R. Britton (D); 15th district: Kevin B. Morrison (D); 16th district: Frank Aguilar (D); 17th district: Sean M. Morrison (R)	President: Democrat; Commissioners: 16 (D), 1 (R)

1st district
Name	Party	Tenure	Terms served
Danny Davis	Democratic	Dec. 1994–Jan. 1997	1/2 term
Darlena Williams-Burnett	Democratic	1997–Dec. 1998	1/2 term
Earlean Collins	Democratic	Dec. 1998–Dec. 2014	4 terms
Richard Boykin	Democratic	Dec. 2014–Dec. 2018	1 term
Brandon Johnson	Democratic	Dec. 2018–May 2023	1 1/3 terms
Tara Stamps	Democratic	June 2023–present	

2nd district
Name	Party	Tenure	Terms served
Bobbie L. Steele	Democratic	Dec. 1994–Dec. 2006	3 terms
Robert Steele	Democratic	Dec. 2006–June 2017	
Dennis Deer	Democratic	July 2017–July 2024	
Michael Scott Jr.	Democratic	July 2024–present	

3rd district
Name	Party	Tenure	Terms served
Jerry Butler	Democratic	Dec. 1994–Dec. 2018	6 terms
Bill Lowry	Democratic	Dec. 2018–present	

4th district
Name	Party	Tenure	Terms served	Notes
John Stroger	Democratic	Dec. 1994–Aug. 2006	3 terms	Also coincidingly served as board president
William Beavers	Democratic	Nov. 2006–March 2013		
Stanley Moore	Democratic	Apr. 2013–present		

5th district
Name	Party	Tenure	Terms served
Deborah Sims	Democratic	Dec. 1994–Dec. 2022	7 terms
Monica Gordon	Democratic	Dec. 2022–Jan. 2025	
Kisha McCaskill	Democratic	Jan. 2025–present	

6th district
Name	Party	Tenure	Terms served
Barclav "Bud" Fleming	Republican	Dec. 1994–Dec. 1998	1 term
William Moran	Democratic	Dec. 1998–Dec. 2002	1 term
Joan Patricia Murphy	Democratic	Dec. 2002–Sep. 2016	3 1/2 terms
Edward Moody	Democratic	Oct. 2016–Dec. 2018	1/2 term
Donna Miller	Democratic	Dec. 2018–present	

7th district
Name	Party	Tenure	Terms served
Joseph Mario Moreno	Democratic	Dec. 1994–Dec. 2010	4 terms
Chuy García	Democratic	Dec. 2010–Dec. 2018	2 terms
Alma E. Anya	Democratic	Dec. 2018–present	

8th district
Name	Party	Tenure	Terms served
Roberto Maldonado	Democratic	Dec. 1994–Aug. 2009	
Edwin Reyes	Democratic	Aug. 2009–Dec. 2014	
Luis Arroyo Jr.	Democratic	Dec. 2014–Dec. 2022	3 terms
Anthony Quezada	Democratic	Dec. 2022–May 2025	
Jessica Vasquez		May 2025–present	

9th district
Name	Party	Tenure	Terms served
Peter N. Silvestri	Republican	Dec. 1994–present	

10th district
Name	Party	Tenure	Terms served
Peter N. Silvestri	Republican	Dec. 1994–2022	7 terms
Maggie Trevor	Democratic	Dec. 2022–present	

11th district
Name	Party	Tenure	Terms served
John P. Daley	Democratic	Dec. 1994–present	

12th district
Name	Party	Tenure	Terms served
Ted Lechowicz	Democratic	Dec. 1994–Dec. 2002	2 terms
Forrest Claypool	Democratic	Dec. 2002–Dec. 2010	2 terms
John Fritchey	Democratic	Dec. 2010–Dec. 2018	2 terms
Bridget Degnen	Democratic	Dec. 2018–present	

13th district
Name	Party	Tenure	Terms served
Calvin Sutker	Democratic	Dec. 1994–Dec. 2002	2 terms
Larry Suffredin	Democratic	Dec. 2002–Dec. 2022	5 terms
Josina Morita	Democratic	Dec. 2022–present	

14th district
Name	Party	Tenure	Terms served
Richard Seibel	Republican	Dec. 1994–Dec. 2002	1 term
Gregg Goslin	Republican	Dec. 1998–Dec. 2018	5 terms
Scott R. Britton	Democratic	Dec. 2018–present	

15th district
Name	Party	Tenure	Terms served
Carl R. Hansen	Republican	Dec. 1994–Dec. 2006	3 terms
Tim Schneider	Republican	Dec. 2006–Dec. 2018	3 terms
Kevin B. Morrison	Democratic	Dec. 2018–present	

16th district
Name	Party	Tenure	Terms served
Allan C. Carr	Republican	Dec. 1994–Dec. 2002	2 terms
Tony Peraica	Republican	Dec. 2002–Dec. 2010	2 terms
Jeff Tobolski	Democratic	Dec. 2010–Mar. 2020	
Frank Aguilar	Democratic	Aug. 2020–present	

17th district
Name	Party	Tenure	Terms served
Herb Schumann	Republican	Dec. 1994–Dec. 2002	2 terms
Elizabeth Ann Doody Gorman	Republican	Dec. 2002–July 20, 2015	
Sean M. Morrison	Republican	July 2015–present	

== See also ==
- Cook County Board of Review
- Chicago City Council
