= Robert Steele (Illinois politician) =

American politician (1961–2017)

Robert B. Steele
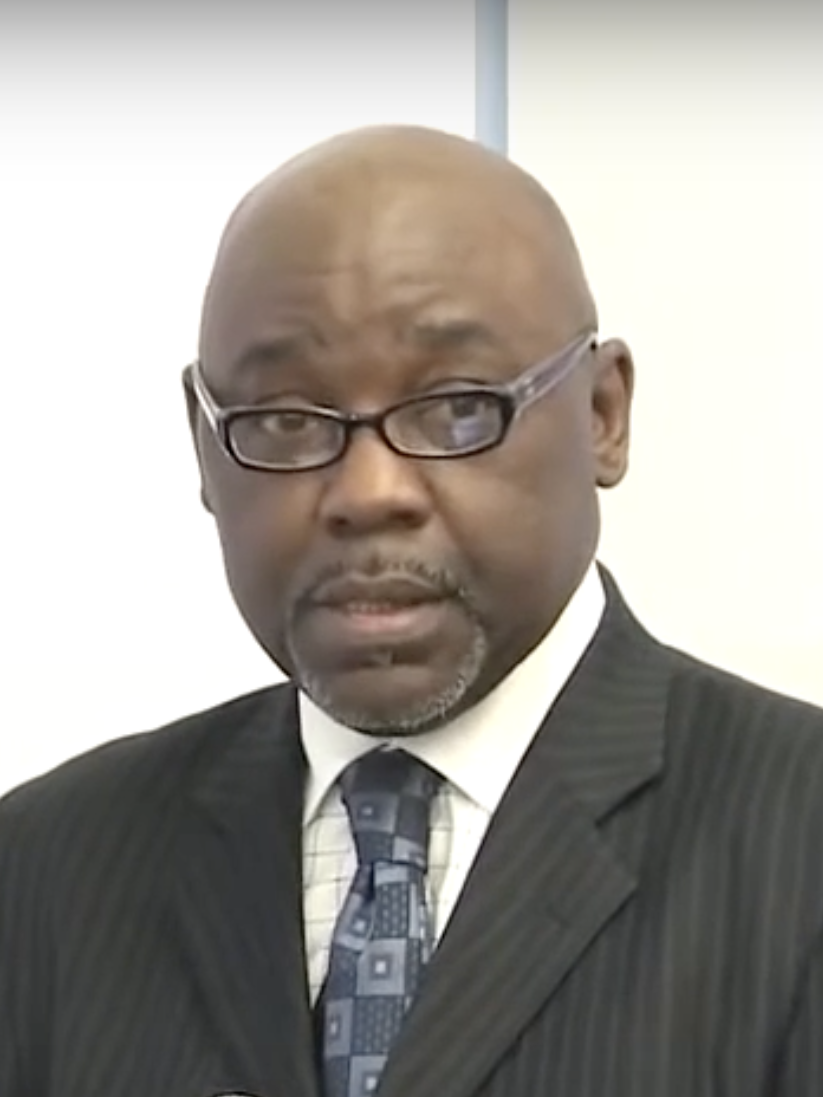
- Steele in 2015

Cook County Commissioner from the 2nd district
- In office 2006–2017
- Preceded by: Bobbie L. Steele
- Succeeded by: Dennis Deer

Personal details
- Born: June 29, 1961
- Died: June 19, 2017 (aged 55)
- Party: Democratic
- Education: Morgan State University

Robert Steele was Commissioner and President Pro Tempore for the 2nd district of Cook County, Illinois, covering the West Side of Chicago. As Cook County Board Commissioner, Steele voted to uphold a 1.5% 2008 Cook County sales tax increase, remaining the highest in the nation which led the Chicago Tribune to encourage voters to vote against him in the 2010 elections.

Until his death in 2017, Steele was chairman of board of Frazier Preparatory Academy.

== Early life ==
He was born in Cook County Hospital, Chicago, Illinois on June 29, 1961, to Robert and Bobbie L. Steele. His mother had previously been both Cook County Commissioner and Board President. Steele is a graduate of the Morgan State University in Maryland. In the mid-1990s, he was the executive director of the Lawndale Business and Local Development Corporation.

== Political career ==
Shortly after her successful reelection in 2006, incumbent Bobbie L. Steele resigned effective November 30, 2006. To fill the subsequent vacancy, local Democratic committeemen appointed Robert B. Steele for the term to which she was elected. Robert Steele was appointed by the Cook County Board of Commissioners and took office on December 6, 2006. Dennis Deer was appointed to fill the vacancy left by Steele's death.

== Death ==
Steele died on June 19, 2017, due to complications related to diabetes.
