= Tim Schneider =

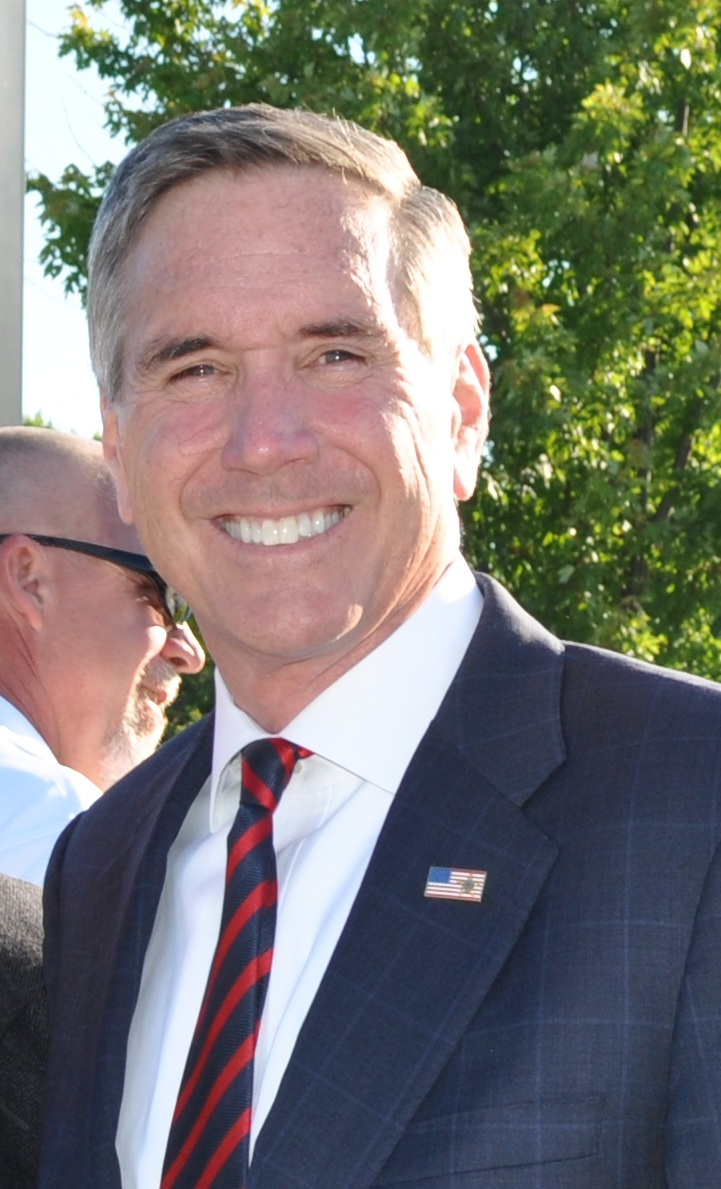
- Schneider in 2013

Chair of the Illinois Republican Party
- In office May 17, 2014 – February 6, 2021
- Preceded by: Jack Dorgan
- Succeeded by: Don Tracy

Member of the Cook County Board of Commissioners from the 15th district
- In office December 2006 – December 2018
- Preceded by: Carl R. Hansen
- Succeeded by: Kevin Morrison

Hanover Township Trustee
- In office 1984–1997

Personal details
- Born: November 11, 1955 (age 70)
- Party: Republican
- Education: University of Illinois Urbana-Champaign (BS)
- Website: Official website

Timothy O. Schneider (born 11 November 1955) is the former chairman of the Illinois Republican Party and a former member of the Cook County Board of Commissioners representing the 15th district, which includes all or parts of Arlington Heights, Barrington, Barrington Hills, Bartlett, Elgin, Elk Grove Village, Hanover Park, Hoffman Estates, Inverness, Mount Prospect, Rolling Meadows, Roselle, Schaumburg, South Barrington and Streamwood.

== Education and personal life ==
Schneider graduated from the University of Illinois with a Bachelor of Science degree. Schneider serves as general partner/owner of The Golf Club of Illinois in Algonquin, and Waterwerks Car Wash in Elgin, Illinois.

== Political career ==
=== Cook County Board of Commissioners ===
In 2006, Schneider was elected to the 15th district seat on the Cook County Board of Commissioners. He was reelected in 2010 and 2014. In 2018, Schneider was defeated in his re-election bid by Democrat Kevin Morrison. CBS News regarded Schneider's defeat by Morrison to be a significant upset victory for the Democratic Party in what was regarded to be a strong year for Democrats.

As a member of the Cook County Board of Commissioners, he was also a de facto member of the board of the Forest Preserve District of Cook County.

==== Commissioner from the 15th District of Cook County, Illinois ====
Upon election he quickly established himself as a strong advocate for the taxpayers of Cook County. The Chicago Tribune called Schneider "a strong and absolutely unwavering voice for streamlining county government" and "an extraordinary member of a Board that could use many more like him."

According to his constituency site, during his first term as commissioner, Schneider lead the fight to repeal President Todd Stroger's sales tax increase. Schneider authored legislation that reduced campaign contribution limits for companies doing business with Cook County in half. As Chairman of the Finance Subcommittee on Workers Compensation, Schneider championed legislation that combats workers compensation fraud by requiring injured employees to submit to recorded interviews detailing each workplace accident.

In 2015, Schneider sponsored a resolution opposing a property tax increase to fill the 2016 budget gap. The resolution was prevented from coming to a vote by political maneuvering at the April 1, 2015 Cook County Board meeting.

Schneider opposed the positions of Toni Preckwinkle (the county board president) and Chuy García (who served as Preckwinkle's floor leader) to a significantly greater extent than his colleagues on the board. However, the county board tended to very few divided votes.

==== Forest Preserve District of Cook County ====
As a member of the Cook County Board of Commissioners, Schneider also served as a commissioner for the Forest Preserve District of Cook County. The Forest Preserves encompass approximately 68,000 acres (275 km²) of open space throughout the county. It contains facilities for recreation and camping, as well as a zoo and a botanic garden.

In 2009, the Cook County Forest Preserve District purchased land owned by Schneider's family for over $10 million. Schneider was called out by many board members, even ones in his own party, for violating ethics.

=== Illinois Republican Party ===
In 2013, Schneider expressed interest in running for Chairman of the Republican Party of Illinois, but pulled out before the vote.

In 2014, Illinois Republican Party Chairman Jack Dorgan decided to resign as chairman so he could join Bruce Rauner's campaign for governor. Both Dorgan and Rauner threw their support behind Schneider to be the next state chairman. Schneider was elected Chairman of the Illinois Republican Party on May 17, 2014 with little opposition.

When beginning his tenure as party chairman, Schneider said that uniting the Republican Party of Illinois, which had been divided geographically and ideologically, as a top goal.

Schneider announced in early December 2020 that he would step down as chairman. On Feb. 6 2021, the Republican State Central Committee elected Don Tracy of Springfield to be chairman.

=== Other public offices ===
Prior to serving on the Cook County Board of Commissioners, Schneider served as Hanover Township Trustee from 1984 to 1997. Additionally, Schneider served as Hanover Township Highway Commissioner from 1997-2006. As highway commissioner, he embarked on an extensive program to improve township roads without impacting the highway commission's bottom line, and he left office with a $2,000,000 surplus of funds.

== Political positions ==
Schneider is a self-described social moderate and fiscal conservative. He supported the 2013 immigration reform bill which was mainly backed by Democrats, but also received some Republican backing.

Party political offices
Preceded by Jack Dorgan	Chair of the Illinois Republican Party; 17 May 2014 – 6 February 2021	Succeeded by Don Tracy
