= Michael Scott Jr. =

American politician

Michael Scott

Member of the Cook County Board of Commissioners from the 2nd district
- Incumbent
- Assumed office July 30, 2024
- Preceded by: Dennis Deer

Member of the Chicago City Council from the 24th ward
- In office May 18, 2015 – June 3, 2022
- Preceded by: Michael Chandler
- Succeeded by: Monique Scott

Personal details
- Born: December 24, 1975 (age 50) Chicago, Illinois, U.S.
- Party: Democratic
- Spouse: Natashee
- Children: 3
- Relatives: Monique Scott (sister)
- Education: Morehouse College (BA)

Michael Scott Jr. is an American politician, business executive, and member of the Cook County Board of Commissioners. From 2015 to 2022, he served as an alderman in the Chicago City Council representing the 24th ward, which includes portions of North Lawndale, South Austin and West Garfield Park. He is a member of the Democratic Party and was a member of the Chicago Aldermanic Black Caucus while in City Council.

== Early life and career ==
Prior to serving on City Council, Scott worked for the Chicago Park District, Chicago Public Schools, the Public Building Commission, and After School Matters.

== Chicago City Council ==
Scott was first elected the alderman for the 24th ward in 2015, replacing outgoing alderman Michael Chandler. Scott served on the following City Council committees: Budget and Government Operations; Rules and Ethics; Economic, Capital and Technology Development; Education and Child Development; Housing and Real Estate; License and Consumer Protection; and Special Events, Cultural Affairs and Recreation.

In the runoff of the 2019 Chicago mayoral election, Scott endorsed Lori Lightfoot. Scott was a City Council ally of Lightfoot after she became mayor.

On May 24, 2022, Scott announced that he would retire from the City Council and join Cinespace Chicago Film Studios as the company's "Head of Industry and Community Relations." His resignation was effective on June 3, 2022. On June 21, Mayor Lori Lightfoot announced that she had nominated Scott's sister, Monique Scott, to fill the position for the remainder of his term, pending confirmation by the City Council. One July 15, Lightfoot announced her appointment of Michael Scott to the Chicago Board of Education.

== Cook County Board of Commissioners ==
After the death of incumbent Dennis Deer, Scott was appointed to succeed him as the commissioner from the 2nd district. In November 2024, Scott won reelection in the special election for the remainder of Deer's term, which runs through December 2026. In March 2026, Scott won the primary election for an additional four-year term as county commissioner.

== Personal life ==
Scott's father, Michael Scott Sr., served as Chicago Board of Education President under Mayor Richard M. Daley.
