= Monique Scott =

American politician

Member of the Chicago City Council from the 24th ward
- Incumbent
- Assumed office June 22, 2022
- Preceded by: Michael Scott Jr.

Personal details
- Born: 1971 or 1972 (age 54–55)
- Party: Democratic
- Relatives: Michael Scott Jr. (brother)
- Education: Jackson State University (BA); National Louis University (MA)

Monique Scott (born 1971/1972) is an American politician, currently serving as an alderman in the Chicago City Council representing the 24th ward, which includes portions of North Lawndale, South Austin and West Garfield Park. She was appointed to the position to replace retiring alderman (and her brother), Michael Scott, on June 22, 2022.

== See also ==
- List of Chicago alderpersons since 1923
