= Cook County Board of Commissioners 2nd district =

- District
- District 2
- Current Board of Commissioners map, 2nd district highlighted in red
- Country: United States
- State: Illinois
- County: Cook
- Municipalities: list: Chicago

Government
  - Type: District
  - Body: Cook County Board of Commissioners
  - Commissioner: Michael Scott Jr. (D)

Cook County Board of Commissioners 2nd district is a single-member electoral district for the Cook County Board of Commissioners. It is currently represented by Michael Scott Jr., a Democrat.

== History ==
The district was established in 1994, when the board transitioned from holding elections in individual districts, as opposed to the previous practice of having two multi-member districts: one for ten members from the city of Chicago and another for seven members from suburban Cook County.

== Geography ==
=== 1994 boundaries ===
When the district was first established, it represented central Chicago.

=== 2001 redistricting ===
New boundaries were adopted in August 2001, with redistricting taking place following the 2000 United States census.

The district continued to entirely lay within the city of Chicago. It represented parts of the central city, West Side, and South Side of the city.

=== 2012 redistricting ===
The district, as redistricted in 2012 following the 2010 United States census, continued to lay entirely within the city of Chicago. It represents parts of the central city, West Side, and South Side of the city.

The district was 24.91 square miles (15,942.15 acres).

=== 2022 redistricting ===
The district, as redistricted in 2022 following the 2020 United States census, continues to lay entirely within the city of Chicago.

== Politics ==
All commissioners representing this district, since its inception, have been Democrats.

== List of commissioners representing the district ==
Commissioner	Party	Years	Electoral history
Bobbie L. Steele	Democratic	December 1994–December 2006	Previously served two terms as commissioner from Chicago at-large; elected in 1994, 1998, 2002
Robert Steele	Democratic	December 2006–June 19, 2017	Elected in 2006, 2010, 2014; died in office on June 19, 2017
Dennis Deer	Democratic	July 13, 2017 – June 23, 2024	Appointed in July 2017; elected in 2018 and 2022; died in office on June 23, 2024
Michael Scott Jr.	Democratic	July 30, 2024–present	Appointed in 2024

== Election results ==
Cook County Board of Commissioners 2nd district general elections
Year	Winning candidate	Party	Vote (pct)	Opponent	Party	Vote (pct)
1994	Bobbie L. Steele	Democratic	41,541	David Whitehead	Harold Washington Party	
1998	Bobbie L. Steele	Democratic	61,487 (100%)			
2002	Bobbie L. Steele	Democratic	59,011 (100%)			
2006	Robert B. Steele	Democratic	59,668 (88.18%)	Michael Smith	Green	7,996 (11.82%)
2010	Robert B. Steele	Democratic	61,499 (87.53%)	Michael Smith	Green	8,761 (12.47%)
2014	Robert B. Steele	Democratic	57,091 (100%)			
2018	Dennis Deer	Democratic	78,380 (100%)			
2022	Dennis Deer	Democratic	53,053 (87.92%)	Evan Kasal	Republican	7,292 (12.08%)
