= Mary McEnerney =

American labor leader (1888–1946)

- McEnerney, from a 1920 publication
- Born: 1888; Chicago, Illinois, U.S.
- Died: April 14, 1946 (aged 57–58); Chicago, Illinois, U.S.
- Occupations: Labor leader, county commissioner

Mary McEnerney (1888 – April 14, 1946) was an American labor leader, suffragist, and county official from Chicago. She organized the Bindery Women's Union Local No. 30, was vice president of the Illinois Federation of Labor from 1922, and served on the Cook County Board of Commissioners from 1930 to 1946.

== Biography ==
McEnerney was born in Chicago. She went to work in a book-binding factory as a child, and organized the Bindery Women's Union when she was still a teenager.

McEnerney chaired the women's suffrage committee of the Chicago Women's Trade Union League (WTUL). She was elected to the Executive Council of the International Brotherhood of Bookbinders in 1914. She was vice president of the Illinois Federation of Labor from 1922, was an officer of the Chicago Allied Printing Trades Council, and represented labor on the State Health Insurance Commission. She was a delegate-at-large to the 1928 Democratic National Convention.

She served for almost 16 years on the Cook County Board of Commissioners, after she was first elected in 1930. In 1942, McEnerney's was the sole vote on the board against banning women from bars. "I fought for woman suffrage and equal rights for women and I'm not going to turn around and vote for this silly discrimination," she declared.

McEnerney died in 1946, at the age of 57, at her nephew's house in Chicago.

== Publications ==
- "Women and the Bindery Trade" (1919)
