= Lillian Piotrowski =

American politician and probation officer

Lillian Piotrowski (July 12, 1911 – April 30, 1974) was an American politician and probation officer.

Born in Chicago, Illinois, Piotrowski went to the Harrison High School in Chicago. She also went to the Chicago Teachers College and then received her bachelor's degree from Loyola University Chicago. Piotrowski was an adult and juvenile probation officer, a deputy sheriff, and a truant officer for the Chicago Board of Education. She was involved with the Democratic Party and in 1969, Piotrowski became the first woman in Chicago named a Democratic ward committeeman. Piotroski served in the Illinois House of Representatives from 1951 to 1964. Piotroski then served on the Cook County Board of Commissioners from 1964 until her death in 1974. Piotrowski died from a heart attack at a hospital in Chicago, Illinois.
