= Charles S. Bonk =

American businessman and politician

Charles Stanley Bonk (May 26, 1920 – April 20, 1976) was an American businessman and politician.

Bonk was born in Chicago, Illinois. He attended Chicago parochial and public schools, and served in the United States Army during World War II. Bonk was involved in the insurance business and with real estate investments. Bonk was involved with the Democratic Party. Bonk served in the Illinois House of Representatives in 1953 and 1954. He also served on the Chicago City Council and the Cook County Board of Commissioners. In 1975, Bonk was found not guilty in the United States District Court on charges concerning extortion and income tax evasion. Bonk died from a heart attack at his home in Chicago, Illinois.
