= George Marquis Bogue =

American politician

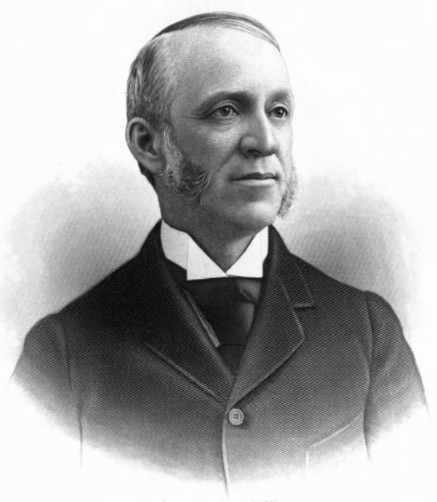

Member of the Illinois House of Representatives from the 2nd district
- In office 1874 – 1876

Member of the Cook County Board of Commissioners
- In office 1872 – 1874

Personal details
- Born: January 21, 1842 Norfolk, New York
- Died: December 30, 1903 (aged 61) Hinsdale, Illinois
- Resting place: Rosehill Cemetery
- Party: Republican
- Profession: Real estate agent
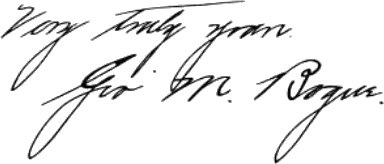
- Signature

George Marquis Bogue (January 21, 1842 – December 30, 1903) was an American politician and real estate agent from New York. Bogue came to Chicago when he was fourteen and soon found employment with his brother. He was elected to the Board of County Commissioners of Cook County in 1872, then served a two-year term in the Illinois House of Representatives two years later. In 1883, he co-founded the Bogue & Hoyt real estate firm, later known as Bogue & Co. He was an early settler to Hyde Park, Illinois, and often represented the town in political positions. Late in his life, Bogue was an arbitrator for several railroad traffic associations.

== Biography ==
George Marquis Bogue was born in Norfolk, New York, on January 21, 1842. When he was fourteen, his family moved west to Chicago, where his brother Hamilton B. had moved four years earlier. Bogue attended public schools there for a year and then found work with his brother with the Merchant Dispatch Fast Freight Line. He moved to Hyde Park, Illinois, in 1858; he was one of the first eight families to settle in the suburb. In April 1859, he matriculated at the Cayuga Lake Academy in Aurora, New York, studying for two years. He returned to his brother's office in 1864, then joined the Land Department of the Illinois Central Railroad. From 1864 to 1868, he served as Hyde Park town clerk.

In October 1867, Bogue joined the office of Ogden, Sheldon & Co., the oldest land agency in Chicago. In his free time, Bogue invested in real estate interests with his brother. He was named Hyde Park treasurer in 1869 and served in this capacity for three years. He was then elected to the Board of County Commissioners of Cook County. Bogue served for two years until he was elected to the Illinois House of Representatives in 1874. He served one two-year term there. When Shelby Moore Cullom was elected governor in 1877, he named Bogue to the Board of Railroad & Warehouse Commissioners. Bogue served on the board until March 1883.

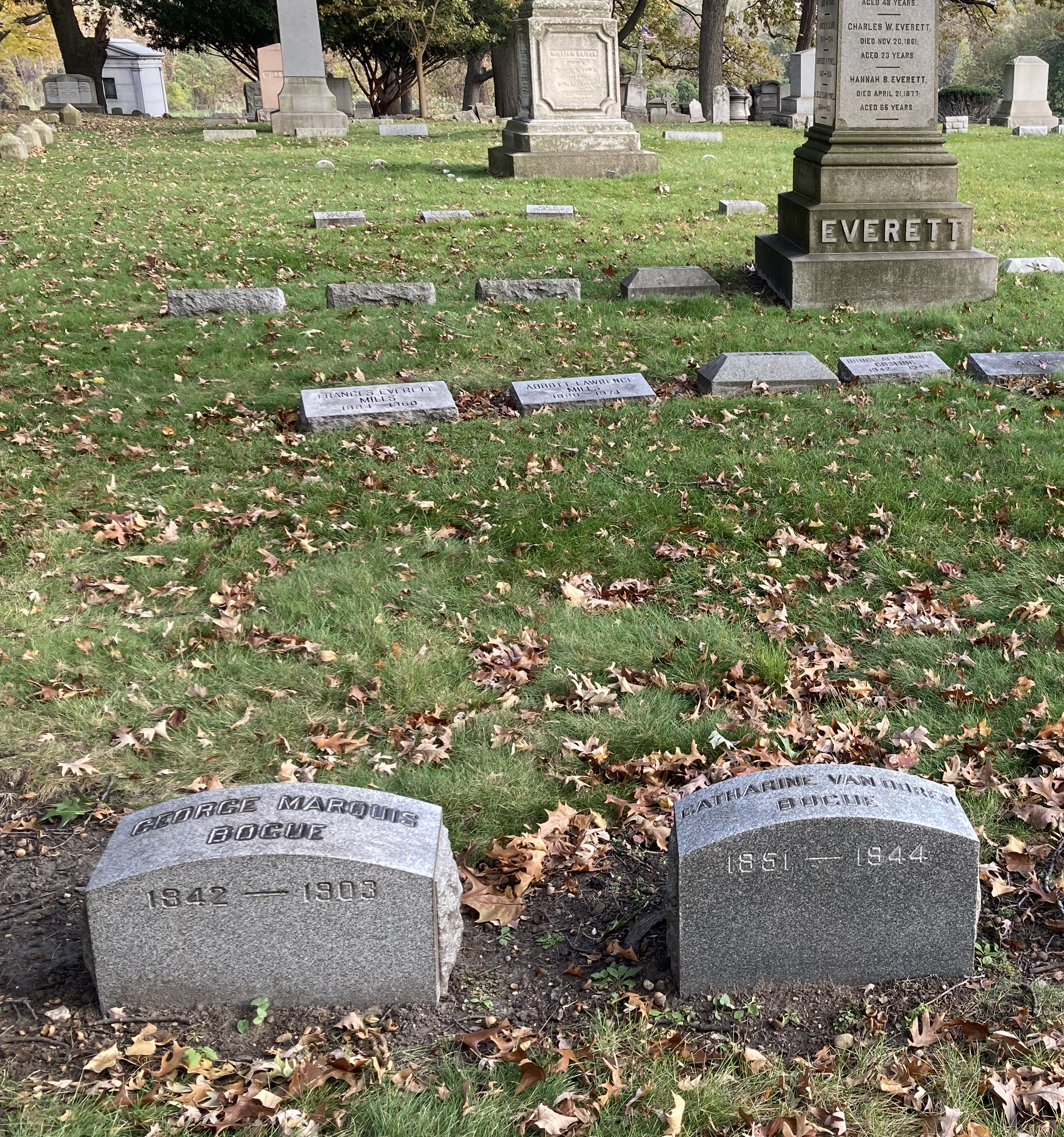
Bogue's grave (left) at Rosehill Cemetery

In 1883, he founded Bogue & Hoyt with his brother and Henry W. Hoyt. The partnership lasted until Hoyt died eight years later, whereupon the company was renamed Bogue & Co. with junior partner Harry W. Christian. Also in 1883, Bogue was elected Arbitrator of the Southwestern Railroad Traffic Association, the Northwestern Traffic Association, and the Colorado Traffic Association, serving for two years. He moved to Hinsdale, Illinois, in 1888. Bogue retired July 1, 1893, though he still maintained personal real estate interests.

Bogue married Catherine M. Van Doren on January 26, 1871. They had six children, three surviving to adulthood. The Bogues were Presbyterians and attended the Hyde Park Presbyterian Church. From 1864 to 1892, Bogue was a member of the church's board of trustees. He was on the board of managers for the Presbyterian Hospital from its 1882 organization and served four years as its president. He was also on the boards of directors for the Home for Incurables and Lake Forest University. He was a member of the executive committee of the Presbyterian League of Chicago.

Bogue died in Hinsdale on December 30, 1903, and was buried in Rosehill Cemetery in Chicago.
