= Todd Stroger =

American politician (born 1963)

Todd H. Stroger

President of the Cook County Board of Commissioners
- In office December 4, 2006 – December 6, 2010
- Preceded by: Bobbie L. Steele
- Succeeded by: Toni Preckwinkle

Chicago Alderman from the 8th ward
- In office September 5, 2001 – December 4, 2006
- Preceded by: Lorraine Dixon
- Succeeded by: Michelle A. Harris

Member of the Illinois House of Representatives from the 31st district
- In office 1992–2001

Village Administrator of Robbins, Illinois
- In office May 2021 – October 2021
- Appointed by: Darren E. Bryant
- Succeeded by: Jasmine Washington

Personal details
- Born: January 14, 1963 (age 63)
- Party: Democratic
- Occupation: Politician

Todd H. Stroger (born January 14, 1963) is the former president of the Cook County, Illinois Board and a former alderman for the 8th ward in Chicago. Stroger is a member of the Democratic Party. In 2001, he was appointed to the Chicago City Council by Richard M. Daley. He is the son of John Stroger, who himself had served as Cook County Board president for 12 years until his death.

On February 2, 2010, Stroger finished last in the Democratic primary for President of the Cook County Board behind Dorothy A. Brown, Terrence J. O'Brien and Toni Preckwinkle (who won the primary), putting him in a lame duck stage for the remainder of his board presidency. Preckwinkle would go on to win the general election and assume office on December 6, 2010.

In 2021, Stroger served as village administrator of Robbins, Illinois.

== Early life ==
Stroger was raised in the Chatham-Avalon neighborhood, located on Chicago's South Side. He attended Gordon Tech and later received his bachelor's degree from Xavier University in New Orleans. Before becoming an alderman he worked as an investment banker for SBK Brooks Investment Corporation.

== Political career ==
In 1992, Stroger was elected as State Representative for the 31st District of Illinois. Stroger worked as a statistician for the Office of the Chief Judge of Cook County; later he was also a jury supervisor with the Cook County Jury Commissioners. He worked for the Chicago Park District during the tenure of Forrest Claypool.

Stroger is an active fundraiser for the United Negro College Fund and a member of the Young Democrats.

=== Aldermanic career ===
In 2001 Stroger was appointed by Mayor Richard M. Daley to replace Lorraine Dixon, who had died while in office. Stroger served on seven committees: Budget and Government Operations; Committees, Rules, and Ethics; Housing and Real Estate; Human Relations; Police and Fire; Special Events and Cultural Affairs; and Traffic Control and Safety.

=== 2006 County Board Presidential nomination ===
On March 14, 2006, John Stroger, Cook County Board of Commissioners president since 1994 and Todd Stroger's father, suffered a serious stroke one week before the Democratic primary. John Stroger eventually won the Democratic nomination, winning about 53 percent of the votes cast, defeating Forrest Claypool. For months after the elder Stroger's stroke he did not appear in public, and his family provided little information about his condition.

Shortly after the stroke, Todd Stroger gave noncommittal responses about the likelihood that his father would remain on the ballot. But in May, he reversed his previous stance, saying his father would return to office. Ultimately, John Stroger would submit his resignation. At the same time that John Stroger submitted his resignation, it was announced that alderman William Beavers would assume the County Commissioner seat while Todd Stroger, if elected, would take over the County Board presidency. This announcement came four days after the deadline for third-party candidates to file for the Board presidency race.

In the aftermath of his father's resignation, Todd Stroger emerged as the front-runner for his father's presidential seat. His main opponent was U.S. Representative Danny K. Davis. Another opponent, County Commissioner Bobbie Steele, dropped out of the race shortly before party leaders chose a new candidate.

On July 18, 2006, the Cook County Democratic Central Committee (a collection of 80 county Democratic party leaders also known as "ward committeemen" or "township committeemen") overwhelmingly chose Todd Stroger to replace his father as the Democratic candidate for Cook County Board president for the Nov. 7, 2006 election. The following day, Steele was unanimously elected by the Board as interim president.

According to state election officials, in July 2008, Stroger's campaign paid almost $27,000 in fines for failing to file paperwork in a timely manner. Paperwork was not filed on time for the 2006 election contributions it received along with late organization papers that were sent to the election board. The campaign also filed incomplete and late reports to the State Board of Elections during the week of July 21, 2008, so more fines are expected to be brought forth.

== Later political and government career ==
Stroger was a candidate in the Democratic primary of the 2020 Cook County clerk of courts election. However, he withdrew his candidacy once a challenge to his ballot petitions had disqualified enough signatures to have him removed from the ballot.

After Darren E. Bryant was elected the mayor of Robbins, Illinois in April 2021, he announced his intention to appoint Stroger as village administrator (city manager). On October 5, 2021, Stroger was moved from his position as village administrator to the position of executive assistant to Bryant, switching places with Jasmine Washington (who became village administrator).

== Criticism and response ==
=== Hiring ===
Stroger drew fire for perceived nepotism, including promoting his cousin Donna Dunnings, who had worked in the County's budget office for 16 years, to the position of the County's chief financial officer. Dunnings and Stroger received additional criticism when she received a $17,000 raise after she initially agreed to not accept a pay hike (in an attempt to help county finances). Dunnings stated that critics could have blocked the pay raise by submitting an amendment to the proposed budget "if they were so concerned about the salary of the first African-American female CFO".

Dunnings was later forced to resign her position after the press reported that she had posted bail for Tony Cole, a former University of Georgia basketball player and busboy whom Stroger had hired to a $60,000/year Cook County position despite Cole's having an extensive felony record. On April 16, 2009, Dunnings resigned at Stroger's request over the scandal involving the hiring of Cole as a human resources assistant in the County Highway Department. Stroger had earlier fired Cole (in Cook County Jail in connection with a domestic violence case at the time Dunnings resigned) for concealing his felony record.

=== Tax increase ===
Stroger also drew criticism when he began raising certain taxes in an effort to balance the county budget and resolve staffing issues. In September 2007, he voiced his support for a proposal to raise the county-wide sales tax to 11 percent (an additional two cents on the dollar) to remedy a $307 million budget deficit, which would force public facilities such as Stroger Hospital to cut services or even close. Critics of the plan included fellow Commissioners Claypool, Gorman, Peraica, and Mike Quigley who argued that spending cuts would accomplish the same purpose. Peraica additionally responded that Cook County's poorest citizens, who the tax hike is ultimately designed to serve, would find it to be the most unaffordable. Peraica's argument was seconded by then-Governor Rod Blagojevich, who expressed his opposition to the plan. Gorman was instrumental, however, in refusing to back down and she introduced a resolution to repeal the sales tax on three separate occasions, finally winning board majority support on the third effort.

On February 29, 2008, the Cook County Board, by a measure of 10-7, passed a budget initiated by Stroger. Stroger's budget contained a tax increase of 1 percentage point, the largest ever passed by Cook County, with the intent of creating more than 1,000 new County jobs. As a result of Stroger's bill, on July 1 the County sales tax increased from 0.75 percent to 1.75 percent bringing Chicago's overall sales tax to 10.25 percent, which was the highest of any major U.S. city, while the sales tax was a minimum of 8.75 percent in suburban Cook County. All five Republican members of the County Board voted against the tax increase and they were joined by two of the twelve Democrats. Commissioners who voted against the tax increase were Peter N. Silvestri, Quigley, Claypool, Gregg Goslin, Timothy Schneider, Peraica, and Elizabeth Ann Doody Gorman. Despite the 133% increase, Dunnings stated on March 31, 2008, that the budget shortfall resolved that year is expected to return. She explained that the expected cost increase would be the result of what she described as a 'structural deficit', meaning increases in revenue being unable to match increases in expense, citing runaway health care costs among other problems. A county spokesman indicated that it would most likely happen in three or four years, well into the next county presidential term.

Because of a number of unanswered questions and unresolved issues surrounding the county tax increase, Cook County's outlying communities, particularly Palatine, IL, considered secession and threatened to do so unless an explanation was provided. To avoid this schism, officials from Palatine and Cook County, including Stroger initially, agreed to hold a town hall meeting at Harper College on April 30 to discuss details of the hike that remain unclear. However, on April 29, Stroger announced that he would not attend, accusing Palatine officials of using the meeting for political grandstanding indicating that he "[would] not debate local Palatine elected officials who expect to exploit this opportunity to further their own political agendas". Eventually, Stroger did attend the Town Hall, which resulted in heavy press coverage and several Daily Herald articles refuting the claims he made while presenting there.

The tax increase was later partially rolled back by 0.5%. Chicago's overall sales tax is 9.75% and suburban Cook County is at minimum 8.25%.

Political offices
Preceded by Bobbie L. Steele	Cook County Board President; 2006–2010	Succeeded by Toni Preckwinkle
