= Toni Preckwinkle =

American politician (born 1947)

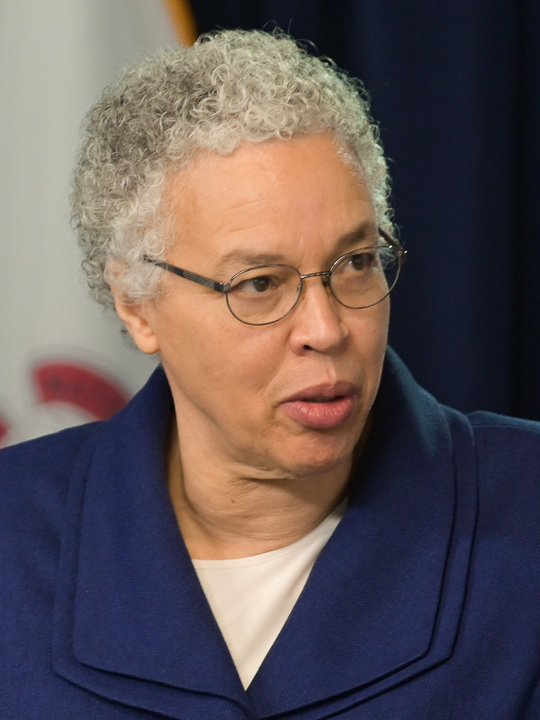
- Preckwinkle in 2021

President of the Cook County Board of Commissioners
- Incumbent
- Assumed office December 6, 2010
- Preceded by: Todd Stroger

Chair of the Cook County Democratic Party
- Incumbent
- Assumed office April 18, 2018
- Preceded by: Joseph Berrios

Member of the Chicago City Council from the 4th ward
- In office April 2, 1991 – December 6, 2010
- Preceded by: Timothy C. Evans
- Succeeded by: Shirley Newsome

Personal details
- Born: Toni Lynn Reed; March 17, 1947 (age 79) Saint Paul, Minnesota, U.S.
- Party: Democratic
- Spouse: Zeus Preckwinkle (m. 1969; div. 2013)
- Children: 2
- Education: University of Chicago (BA, MA)

Toni Lynn Preckwinkle (née Reed; born March 17, 1947) is an American politician and the incumbent County Board president in Cook County, Illinois, United States. She was elected to her first term as president of the Cook County Board of Commissioners, the executive branch of Cook County government, in November 2010, becoming the first woman elected to that position.

Preckwinkle previously served as a five-term alderman in the Chicago City Council, representing Chicago's 4th ward centered in Hyde Park. During her tenure, she emerged as the council's prominent defender of affordable housing. She was also the runner-up in the 2019 election for mayor of Chicago.

Among other issues, she is known for championing the county's controversial sweetened beverage tax, sponsorship of living wage ordinances, concerns about the costs and benefits of the Chicago bid for the 2016 Summer Olympics, and her strong stance against police brutality and the use of excessive force.

== Early life, education, and career ==
Toni Lynn Reed was born in St. Paul, Minnesota, and attended local schools there. She graduated from Washington High School in St. Paul in 1965. During high school, she worked on the campaign of Katie McWatt, who was the first African American person to run for St. Paul City Council. She moved to Chicago to study at the University of Chicago in the Hyde Park community area, where she earned her bachelor's in 1969, and later a master's degree in 1977.

After college, Preckwinkle taught history for ten years in several high schools in the Chicago metropolitan area, including Calumet High School, the Visitation School, and Aquinas.

In 1985 and 1986, Preckwinkle served as President of the Disabled Adult Residential Enterprises (DARE). She was active in community organizations, serving as a member of the board of directors of the Illinois Council Against Handgun Violence, and Political Action Director of the Near South Chapter of the Independent Voters of Illinois (IVI-IPO).

During and after her 1987 aldermanic election campaign, she worked as a planner for the Chicago Department of Economic Development. By 1990, she was working as executive director of the Chicago Jobs Council and become allied with civil rights attorney R. Eugene Pincham.

== Unsuccessful 1983 and 1987 Chicago City Council campaigns ==
Chicago's fourth ward is on the South Side of Chicago, adjacent to the Lake Michigan lakefront. It includes all of the Kenwood and Oakland community areas, and portions of Hyde Park, Washington Park, Grand Boulevard, Douglas and the South Loop community areas. The northern part of the ward (North of 45th Street) is predominantly African American, while the more racially diverse southern half is predominantly middle and upper middle-class.

In her first two aldermanic campaigns for the 4th ward, in 1983 and 1987, Preckwinkle lost to the incumbent, Timothy C. Evans, who had been in office since 1973. Evans was Chicago Mayor Harold Washington's City Council floor leader and lieutenant. In 1983, Preckwinkle, supported by many independent voters, received enough support in the preliminary election to force a runoff election (Chicago Aldermen are elected without regard to political party affiliation, but must earn a majority of votes or the top two candidates have a runoff election). In the runoff, Preckwinkle carried traditionally "independent" precincts in Hyde-Park, but Evans carried the precincts in the north of the Ward.

In the 1987 elections, Evans defeated Preckwinkle by a 77% to 21% margin. In 1987, although both the Chicago Tribune and Chicago Sun-Times endorsed Evans, they praised Preckwinkle for qualities including her intelligence and independence, and expressed hopes she would continue in politics. Preckwinkle was endorsed by then state Rep. Carol Moseley Braun and also by the Independent Voters of Illinois-Independent Precinct Organization. Mayor Harold Washington endorsed Evans.

== Chicago City Council (1991–2010) ==
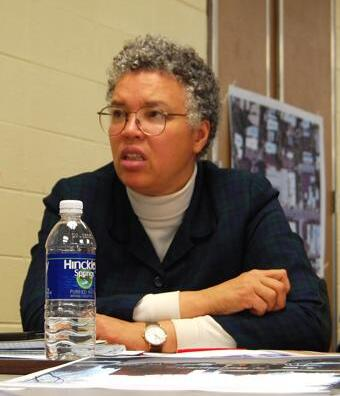
Preckwinkle in 2008

=== 1991 election ===
In 1991, Preckwinkle and four others challenged Evans for the 4th ward alderman's position. In the first round of voting on February 26, 1991, she won nearly one-third popular vote in the ward by winning 20 of 58 precincts (all in the Hyde Park-Kenwood community). Evans and Preckwinkle again advanced to a runoff election, as they had in 1983. This time the majority of the eliminated candidates endorsed Preckwinkle. On April 2, 1991, Preckwinkle performed better in the northern part of the ward and was elected by a 109-vote margin, defeating the 17-year incumbent alderman Evans.

=== Overview of tenure ===
Preckwinkle was initially sworn into office in 1991, and was reelected to four-year terms in 1995, 1999, 2003, and 2007.

In City Council, Preckwinkle developed a reputation for progressiveness. She was known as being independent of then-Mayor Richard M. Daley, with whom she dissented more often than any other alderman. In addition, Preckwinkle was one of the few aldermen on the City Council occasionally critical of the policies of former Chicago Mayor Richard J. Daley.

In 2004, she and Dorothy Tillman were the only aldermen to vote against the mayor's city budget, and in 2005, Preckwinkle was the lone dissenter on the mayor's budget. Preckwinkle has supported the majority of legislation advanced by the mayor and his allies, including most of Daley's annual budget proposals; his controversial use of tax increment financing, an economic development program in which tax revenues are funneled into accounts controlled almost exclusively by the mayor; and, ultimately, his quest to host the 2016 Summer Olympics.

=== Affordable housing ===
Preckwinkle championed set-asides for affordable housing as her signature issue. The municipal ordinances she sponsored in 1993 and 1999 for affordable housing increased city expenditures on low and moderate income housing by 50 percent. In 2007, she pushed for increases in the existing Affordable Requirements Ordinance. This mandates that housing developers using land bought at a discount from the city, must reserve at least 10 percent of their housing units as "affordable", or to contribute money to an affordable-housing fund that would be equivalent to increasing the percentage to 15 percent. Affordable housing is considered a key element in the debate about ending homelessness in Chicago.

Preckwinkle's depth of knowledge of public housing has been recognised in the national press, which cited her defense of the maligned Vince Lane when the federal government took over Chicago's public housing projects.

=== Police accountability ===
Preckwinkle was outspoken in support of the city settling the Jon Burge police torture case, rather than continuing to spend money in the litigation process. She was also proactive in the effort to pursue compensation for victims of police brutality in the related Burge cases, and sought hearings on the initial special prosecutor's report. She has been a critic of the decades-long delay in settling the case, and supported the settlement.

In 2007, Preckwinkle pursued disclosure of Chicago Police Department officers who were accused of using excessive force. The United States District Court had ruled that the records be unsealed and made available to the public. However, on July 13, 2007, the city filed an emergency motion to stay the judge's order. When the city argued in the 7th Circuit Court of Appeals against disclosure, it said that aldermen would have access to the information, but Preckwinkle's August 23, 2007, request for the data was denied.

=== Economic policy ===
Preckwinkle was a co-sponsor of the living wage ordinances that passed the city council in 1998 and 2002. On July 26, 2006, Preckwinkle was one of 35 aldermen who voted to approve the 2006 Chicago Big Box Ordinance sponsored by Alderman Joe Moore (49th). For 7 weeks, until the law was overturned, Chicago was the largest United States city to require big-box retailers to pay a "living wage."

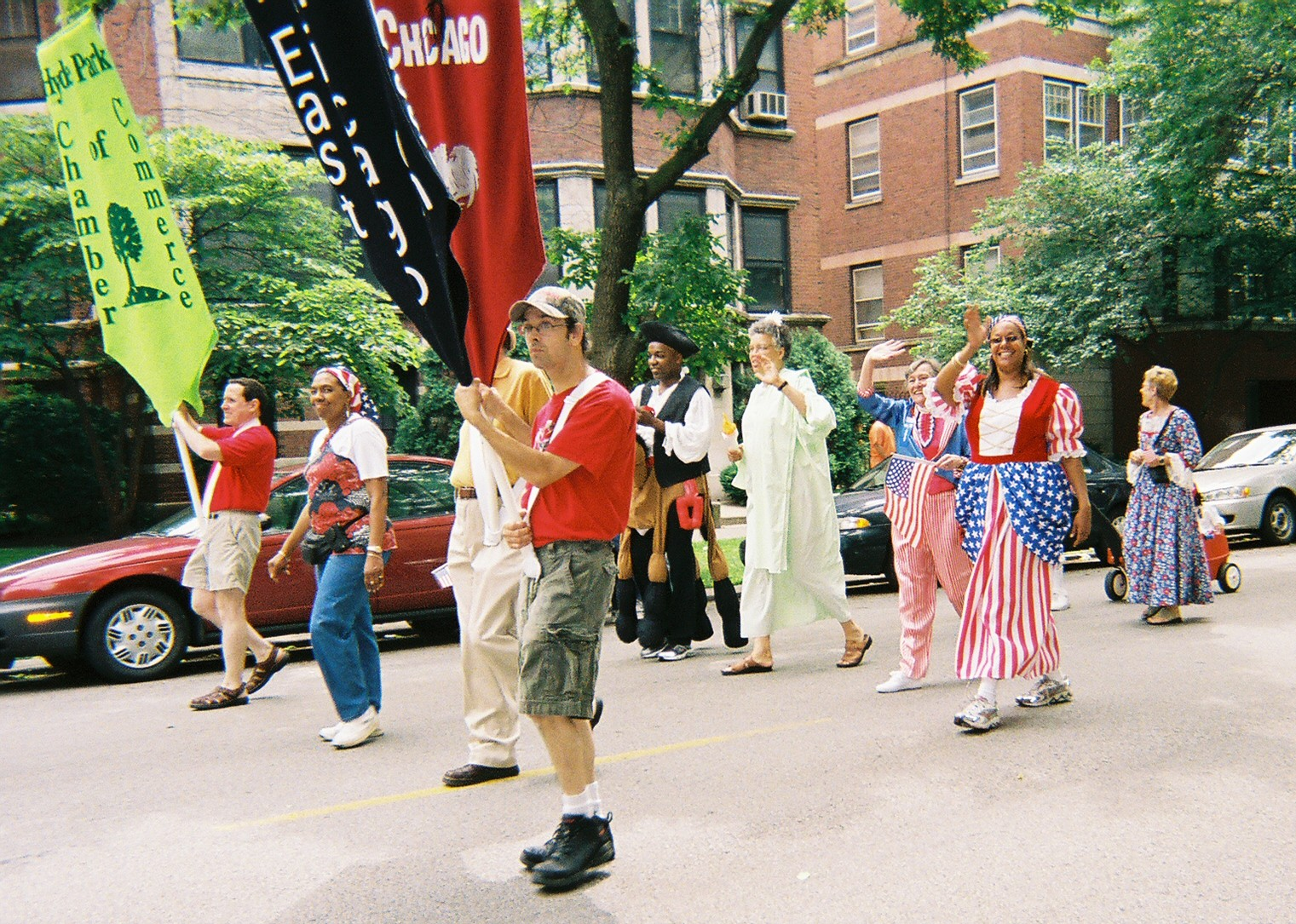
Hyde Park 2006 Independence Day parade (left to right starting at center in light green): Preckwinkle as the Statue of Liberty, Illinois State Representative Barbara Flynn Currie as Uncle Sam, and Chicago City Council Alderman Leslie Hairston as Betsy Ross

=== Ward-level issues ===
In October 2007, Preckwinkle opposed naming a landmark in the 4th ward for Saul Bellow, the 1976 Nobel literature laureate, reportedly because Bellow had made remarks that Preckwinkle considered racist. She also opposed the renaming of a stretch of street near the original Playboy Club as "Hugh Hefner Way."

In 2006, Preckwinkle decided to paint over two 36-year-old, neglected and severely damaged public murals in the 47th Street Metra underpass. The murals had been created by graffiti artists, working with permission from the Chicago Department of Cultural Affairs, and had represented themes that included Latin-American, African, Mayan, Indian, and Native American spiritual practices. The walls were later covered with murals that were newly commissioned by the city: one is made up of a series of ceramic tiles and the other is a traditional painted mural, featuring the city and important historical South Side figures, including former Alderman Dorothy Tillman.

==== Chicago 2016 Olympic bid ====
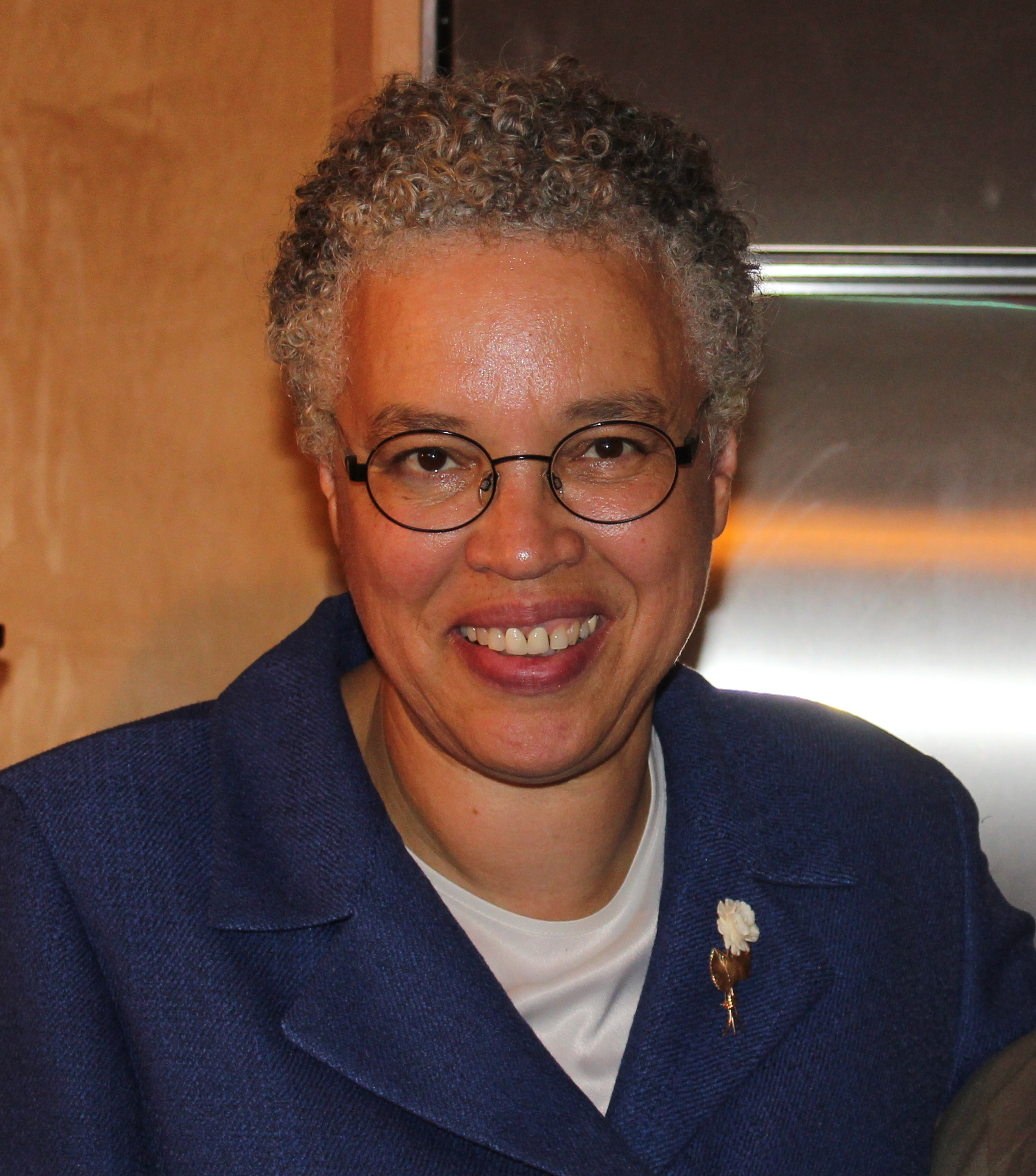
Preckwinkle in 2012

The Chicago 2016 Olympic bid would have placed the main site of the $1.1 billion residential complex in the 4th Ward, to accommodate athletes in an Olympic Village. Chicago was not chosen. Preckwinkle expressed her reservations about the initial plan, and was involved in plan revisions.

Since the construction was planned almost entirely in her ward, she expressed concern that her constituents had not been offered a chance to voice their concerns with the plan. She was an early advocate of moving what would have been the Olympic Village from the McCormick Place truck yard to the Michael Reese Hospital site.

She also had concerns about how the proposed project would be financed. On March 14, 2007, Preckwinkle joined four other South Side aldermen in voting against a $500 million public-funded guarantee to back up Chicago's Olympics bid. But on September 9, 2009, Preckwinkle voted to authorize Mayor Richard Daley to sign the International Olympic Committee's host city contract, which included financial guarantees putting full responsibility for the Olympics and its proposed $4.8 billion operating budget on taxpayers.

== Cook County Board president (2010–present) ==
Since December 2010, Preckwinkle has served as president of the Cook County Board of Commissioners. Her tenure has seen her wield a great amount of top-down control on what has been a rather unified legislative body. This is in contrast to the discord that the Board saw in its four years under her immediate predecessor, Todd Stroger. John Byrne and Alice Yin of the Chicago Tribune have characterized Preckwinkle as pursuing and implementing a "progressive agenda" as Board president.

=== 2010 election ===
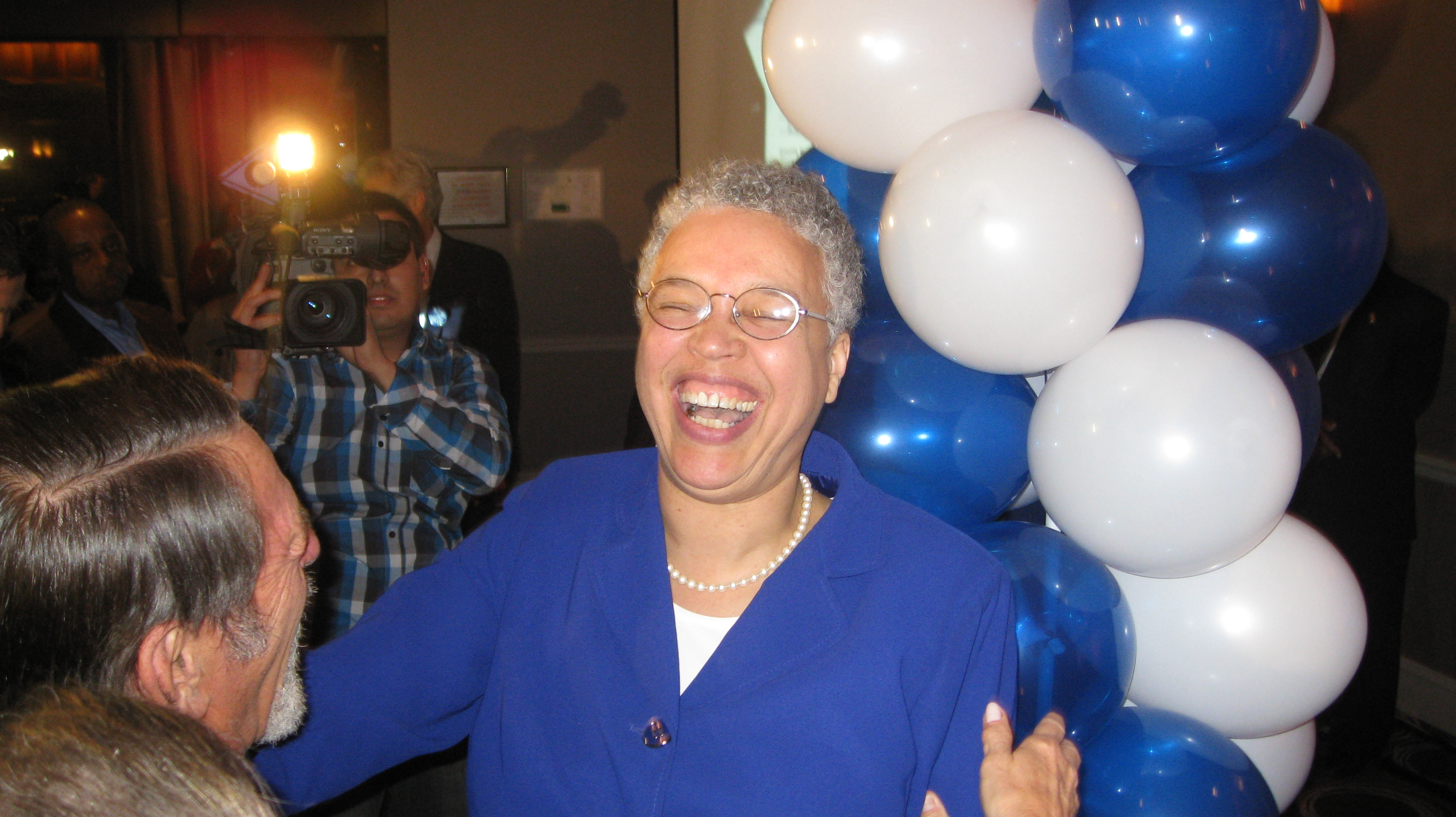
Preckwinkle celebrating her 2010 Democratic primary election win

Preckwinkle announced in January 2009, that she would run for president of the Cook County Board of Commissioners. She launched her campaign website on June 18, 2009. On February 2, 2010, she won a strong victory in the Democratic Party primary election, defeating the incumbent Board President Todd Stroger and fellow challengers Dorothy Brown (the clerk of the Cook County Circuit Court) and Terrence J. O'Brien, as well as Green Party nominee Thomas Dresser. Preckwinkle received 48.99% in the primary despite there being a four-way race. Preckwinkle received 69.54% of the vote in the general election. Preckwinkle faced Republican nominee Roger A. Keats in the November general election.

The four years prior to the 2010 election had seen the county government endure some of the greatest tumult that it had experienced in decades. As a candidate, Preckwinkle pledged that she would reform the Cook County government stability and repair the county's finances.

Winning the general election, Preckwinkle became the first woman elected as president of the Cook County Board of Commissioners. She won over two-thirds of the vote. After her Republican opponent received 26% of the vote, he moved out of the state.

=== First term ===
Resigning as alderman in order to take the office of County Board president, Preckwinkle recommended that Chicago Mayor Richard M. Daley appoint William D. Burns to succeed her as fourth ward alderman, but Burns preferred to run in an open primary. Mayor Daley appointed Shirley Newsome as a "caretaker" alderman on January 12, 2011. Preckwinkle had urged this appointment. Burns handily won the election for the seat a month later.

After taking office as the chief executive of the United States' second-most-populous county, Preckwinkle made newly elected Cook County Commissioner Chuy García her floor leader on the county board.

At the time she first took office, Cook County had the largest jail population of any county in the United States. The county was also considered to have a high level of political corruption in its government.

In her first term, Preckwinkle saw all of her initiatives enacted by the county board, with the Board effectively resembling a "rubber stamp" to Preckwinkle. This was in major contrast to the preceding tenure of Todd Stroger, under whom the council saw intense infighting. On the few matters where Preckwinkle did not prevail on matters, the motivating factor for dispute was typically based upon political feuds between members of the Board rather than policy disagreements with Preckwinkle's position. Very few votes were divided. However, on the votes that did see division, the most frequent opposition to Preckwinkle's position arose from three Democratic members that had been allies of Todd Stroger: Earlean Collins, Joan Patricia Murphy, and William Beavers (prior to his November 2012 departure from the Board). These three were more frequent opponents to Preckwinkle's positions than the four Republican members of the Cook County Board of Commissioners were.

Fiscal issues that Preckwinkle inherited included an overgrown county payroll and a county government pension crisis. Preckwinkle's first three budgets each passed with no more than a single opposing vote. Preckwinkle championed a 1% decrease to the county's sales tax that was passed by the county board. Cook County had had what was, at the time, the highest sales tax rate of any county in the United States.

On September 7, 2011, the county board voted (aligned with Preckwinkle's position) to pass an ordinance that would have the county disregard a request by the federal government that the county jails detain suspects for an additional two days if there were questions about their immigration status in order to allow time to verify their immigration status. Preckwinkle's position had been that she would be unwilling to heed this request unless the federal government would reimburse the county for the expenses it incurred from such extended detentions, and the federal government had refused to compensate the county. Preckwinkle faced criticism for proclaiming that the ordinance to ignore the federal governments' request would actually enhance public safety. Four Republican members of the United States Senate's Committee on the Judiciary wrote a letter to Janet Napolitano, the secretary of homeland security, decrying the county ordinance as a "serious threat to public safety". This generated national news coverage of the ordinance.

In August 2012, Dr. Nancy Jones, former head of the Cook County Morgue, referred to Preckwinkle as "evil" in criticizing her handling of the management and budgeting of the Morgue. Jones alleged that bodies had piled up and conditions were filthy. Also in August 2012, Preckwinkle defended Chicago's action to decriminalize possession of small amounts of cannabis by allowing police to write tickets. She asserted that drug laws had unfairly resulted in more minorities being incarcerated for minor offenses.

=== Second term ===
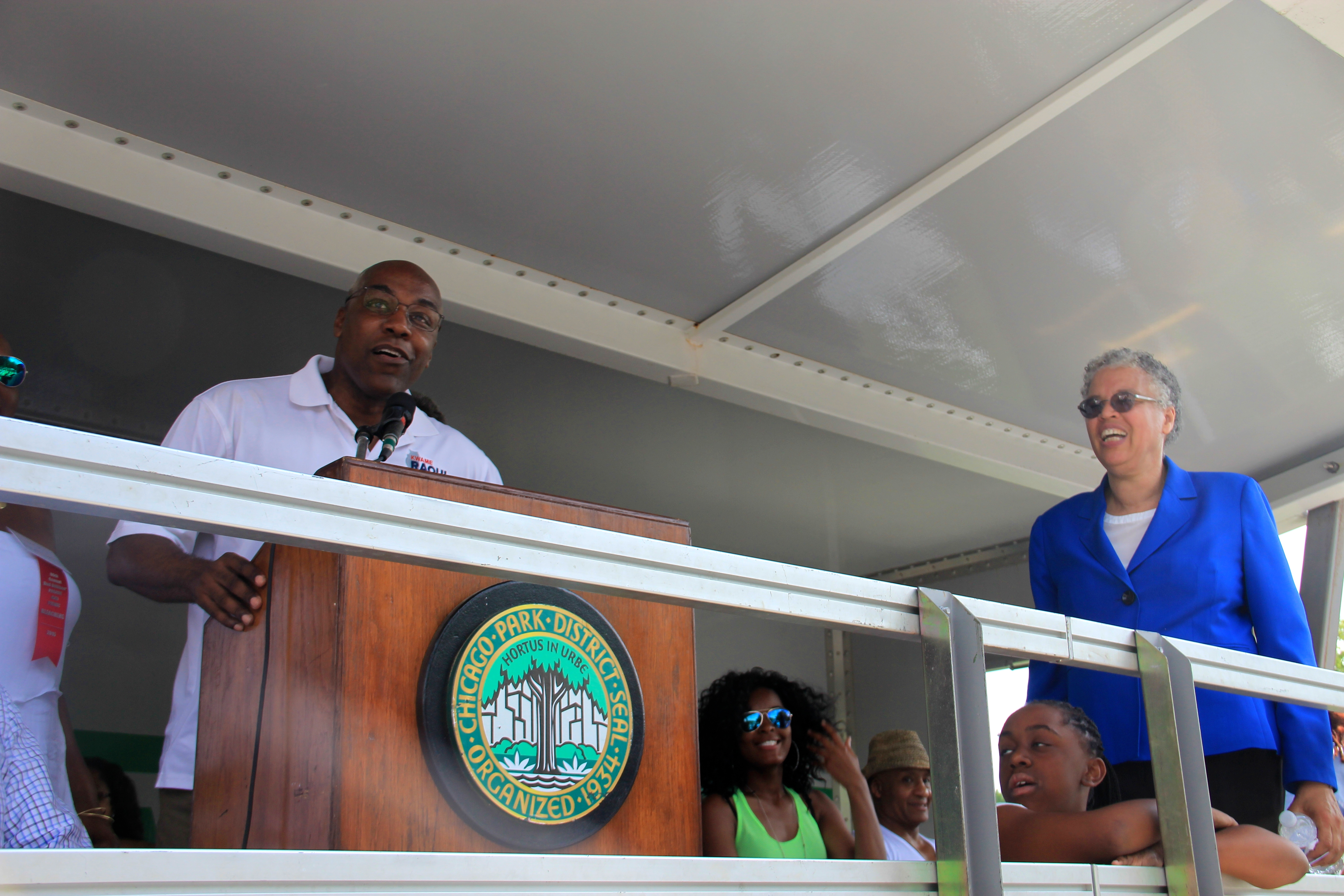
Preckwinkle (right) with then-state senator Kwame Raoul at the 2015 Bud Billiken Parade and Picnic

Preckwinkle was reelected in November 2014, going unchallenged on the ballot in both the Democratic primary and the general election. This lack of any challenger was unusual. Her two immediate elected predecessors, John Stroger and Todd Stroger, had usually faced primary election opponents during their reelection campaigns.

During her second term, Preckwinkle saw nearly all of the legislation she supported get passed by the county board. By January 2018, Preckwinkle had only seen two votes by the board go against a position she and her floor leader, Chuy García, had supported, with these two votes being a resolution about "stop and frisk" procedures by the Chicago Police Department and the repeal of the county's "soda tax". Very few votes by the County Board saw any division among its commissioners. The matters that tended to see the most divided votes were regarding budgeting and taxes. By January 2018, the board had seen any dissent on only 140 votes. This lack of divided votes came despite the fact that the board had four Republican members during this term, including Illinois Republican Party Chairman Tim Schneider and Cook County Republican Party Chair Sean M. Morrison. However, the frequency of divided votes was still greater than it had been Preckwinkle's previous term. The 70 divided votes seen in the first year of Preckwinkle's second term alone eclipsed the mere 70 which had occurred in the first three years of her previous term.

In Preckwinkle's second term, the county reached a number of benchmarks she had set as goals. This included seeing a decrease in residents' cost of healthcare, coinciding with an increase in enrollment in health coverage provided through the Affordable Care Act (ACA) which increased state and federal healthcare funding to the county. Preckwinkle had placed great effort in increasing the county's enrollment in the ACA. This also included a 3,800 person decrease in the daily inmate population in the county's jails by the start of 2018 as well as a decrease to the per-inmate cost of operating the prisons. It also included an 11% decrease of county government debt by the start of 2018. The county government had decreased its spending while increasing the taxes it imposed.

Despite being regularly mentioned as a possible challenger to incumbent Rahm Emanuel for the Chicago mayoralty, Preckwinkle declined to run in the 2015 Chicago mayoral election. Preckwinkle declined to make an endorsement in that election, despite the fact that her own county board floor leader, Chuy García, was Emanuel's prime challenger.

In order to balance increased spending and significant pension debt owed by the county, the Cook County Board of Commissioners voted on July 15, 2015, to pass a measure proposed by Preckwinkle which raised the county's sales tax to the level that it had been prior to her earlier 1% decrease.

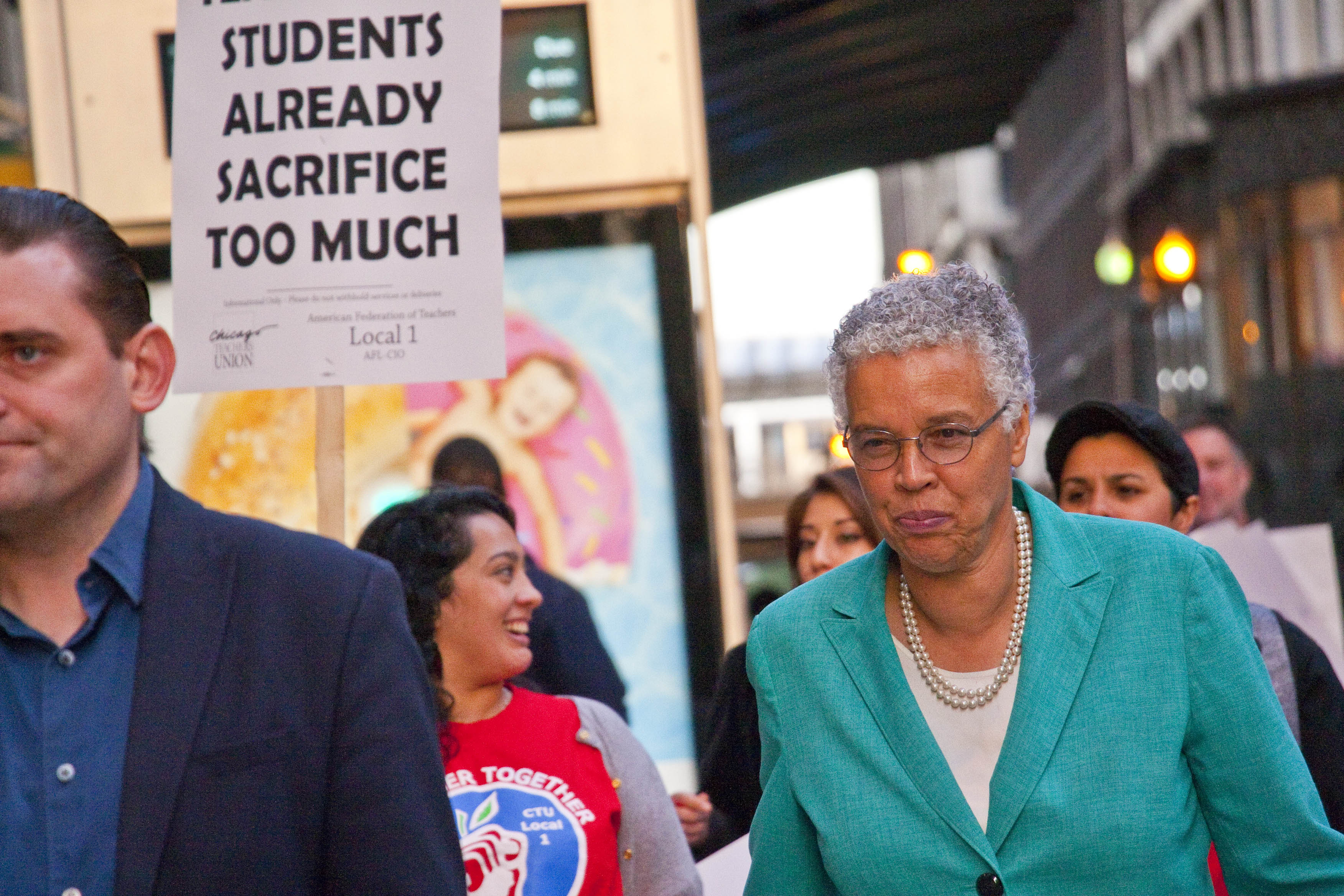
Preckwinkle (right) at a 2018 protest organized by the Chicago Teachers Union

On March 22, 2016, Preckwinkle announced that she had selected Brian Hamer, who served as the state's revenue director under Gov. Rod Blagojevich and then Quinn, to replace Tasha Green Cruzat as her chief of staff.

Preckwinkle championed a "soda tax" taxing all retail sales of sweetened beverages made in the county at a rate of once cent per ounce. The tax was adopted by the county board on November 10, 2016. Exempted from the tax were purchases that were made using Supplemental Nutrition Assistance Program (SNAP) benefits since federal law prohibited state and local taxes from being imposed on purchases made with SNAP benefits. 870,000 Cook County residents received SNAP benefits at the time. The "soda tax" was unpopular with Cook County residents. A poll commissioned by the Illinois Manufacturer's Association conducted shortly after the adoption of the tax found 87% disapproval of the tax by Cook County residents. Preckwinkle remained steadfast in her support for the tax. In defense of the tax, Preckwinkle argued that it was a justified means of achieving the public health goal of decreasing Cook County residents' consumption of sugar. She would, after its repeal, admit that health concerns had not been the sole motivation behind adopting the tax, remarking, that the greater motivation for its adoption was the generation of revenue for the county. In October 2017, against Preckwinkle's wishes, the county board repealed the tax by a vote of 15–2. The repeal of the tax created a $200 million hole in the county's budget for 2018.

=== Third term ===
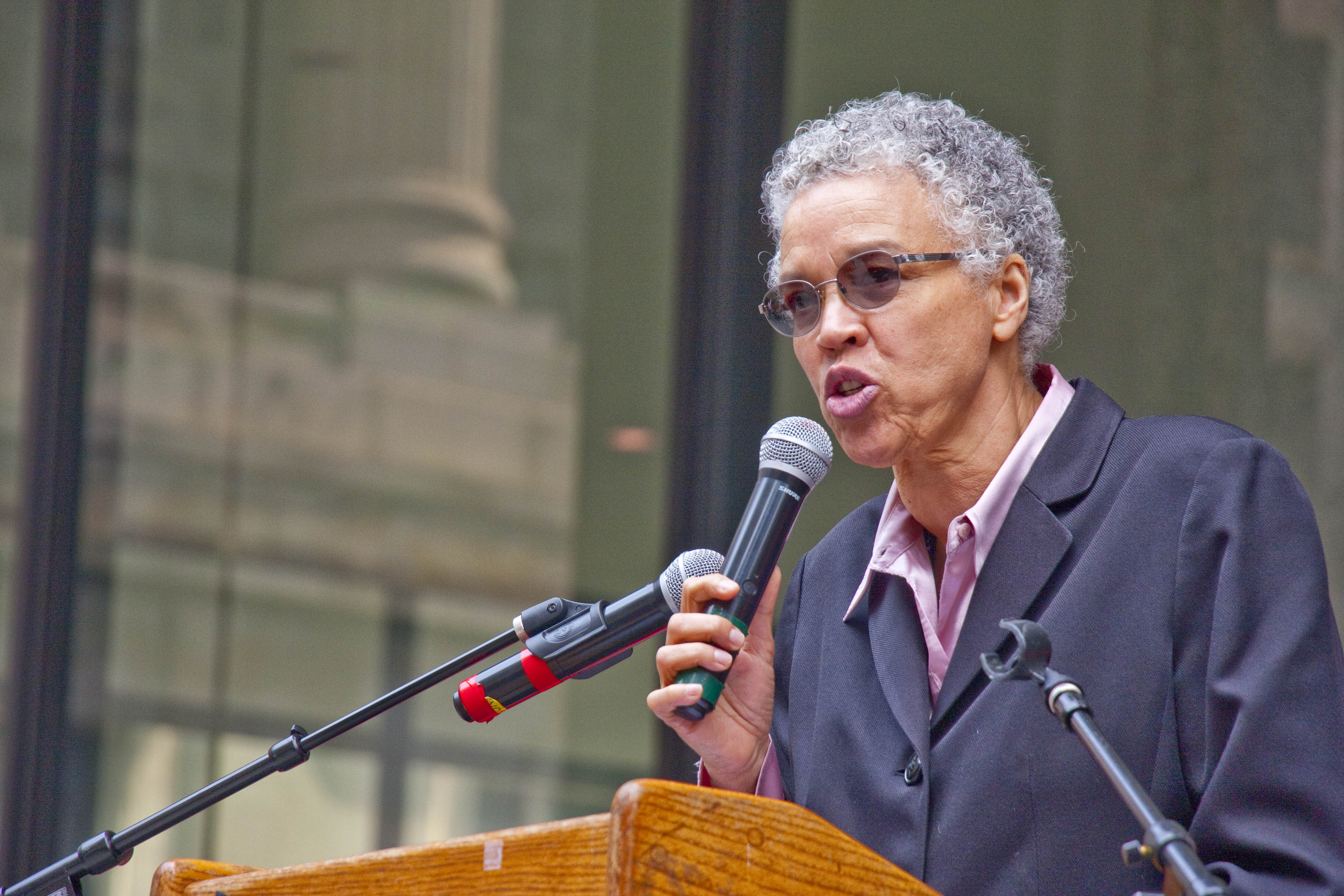
Preckwinkle speaking at the March 2019 "Equal Pay for Women" rally

Preckwinkle was reelected to a third term in 2018. Preckwinkle had been challenged by Bob Fioretti, a former Chicago alderman who attempted to capitalize on the unpopularity of the "soda tax". Preckwinkle easily defeated Fioretti, winning 60.82% of the vote to Fioretti's 39.18%. Preckwinkle was unchallenged on the ballot in the general election. During the 2018 elections, anticipating a potential wave election year for Democrats, Preckwinkle made a concerted effort to increase the Democrats' majority on the Cook County Board of Commissioners, focusing her efforts on three of the Board's four Republican-held seats. Preckwinkle-backed Democratic nominees succeeded in ousting Republican incumbents in the 14th and 15th districts, but fell roughly a mere 2,000 votes shy of unseating the 17th district's Republican incumbent. Preckwinkle did not target the Republican-held 9th district seat, as the incumbent Republican, Peter N. Silvestri, was both popular and a political centrist and had a reputation for being a peacemaker on the Board at times when conflict arose between its members.

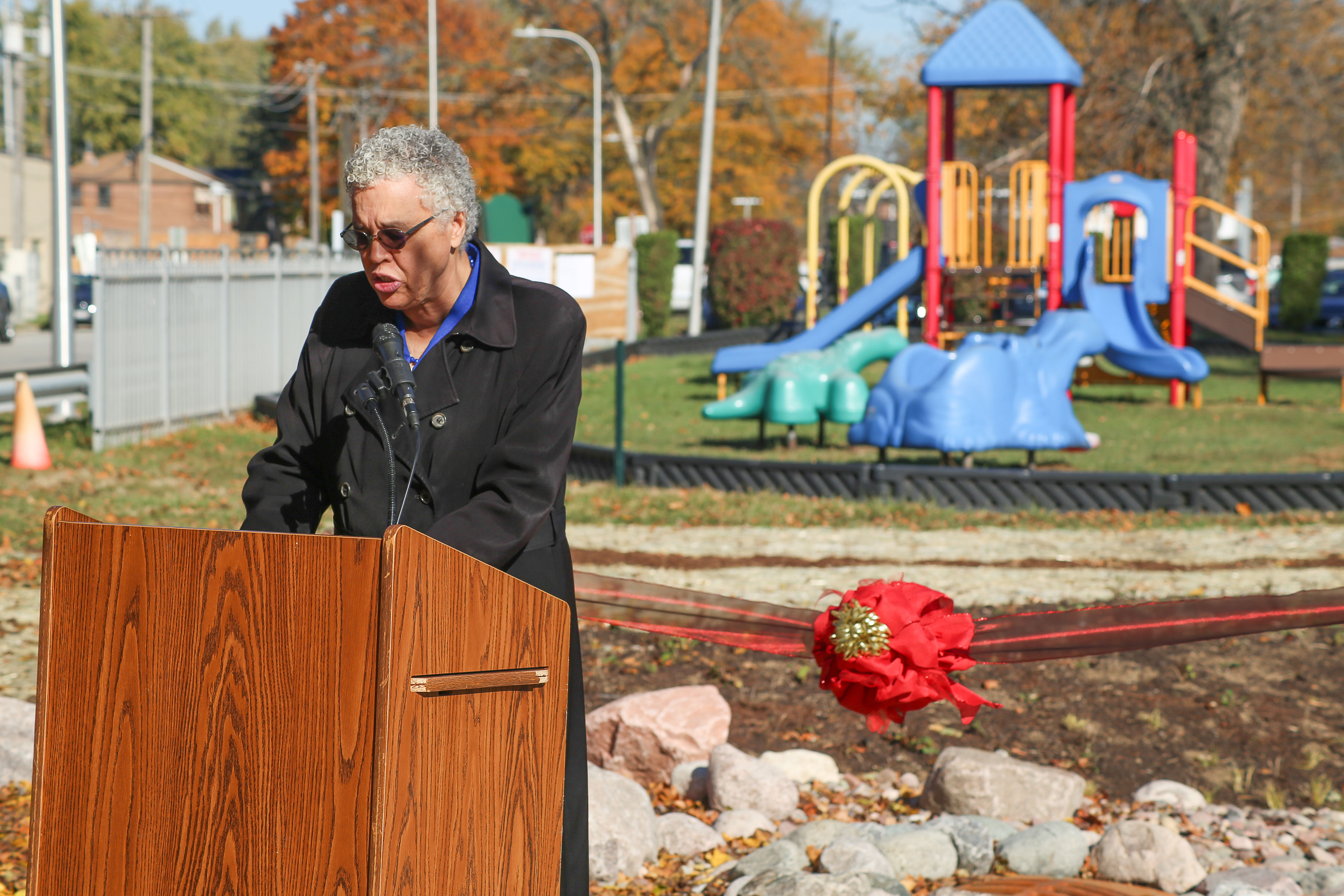
Preckwinkle speaking at a ribbon cutting ceremony for a rain garden at a public park in October 2022

In 2018, under Preckwinkle's leadership, Cook County controversially requested an easement to build a road at taxpayer expense (~$750K-$1M) to pave public green space and the 10th hole of the Canal Shores Golf Course in the northern suburbs, which benefited of State Senators President John Cullerton and a private developer. The easement was approved by the Metropolitan Water Reclamation District of Greater Chicago despite strong opposition by local residents and the Wilmette Park District.

In 2018, Preckwinkle launched an unsuccessful candidacy for mayor of Chicago. She advanced to the runoff of the 2019 Chicago mayoral election, but suffered a landslide defeat against Lori Lightfoot.

Preckwinkle did not make an endorsement ahead of the 2020 Illinois Democratic presidential primary.

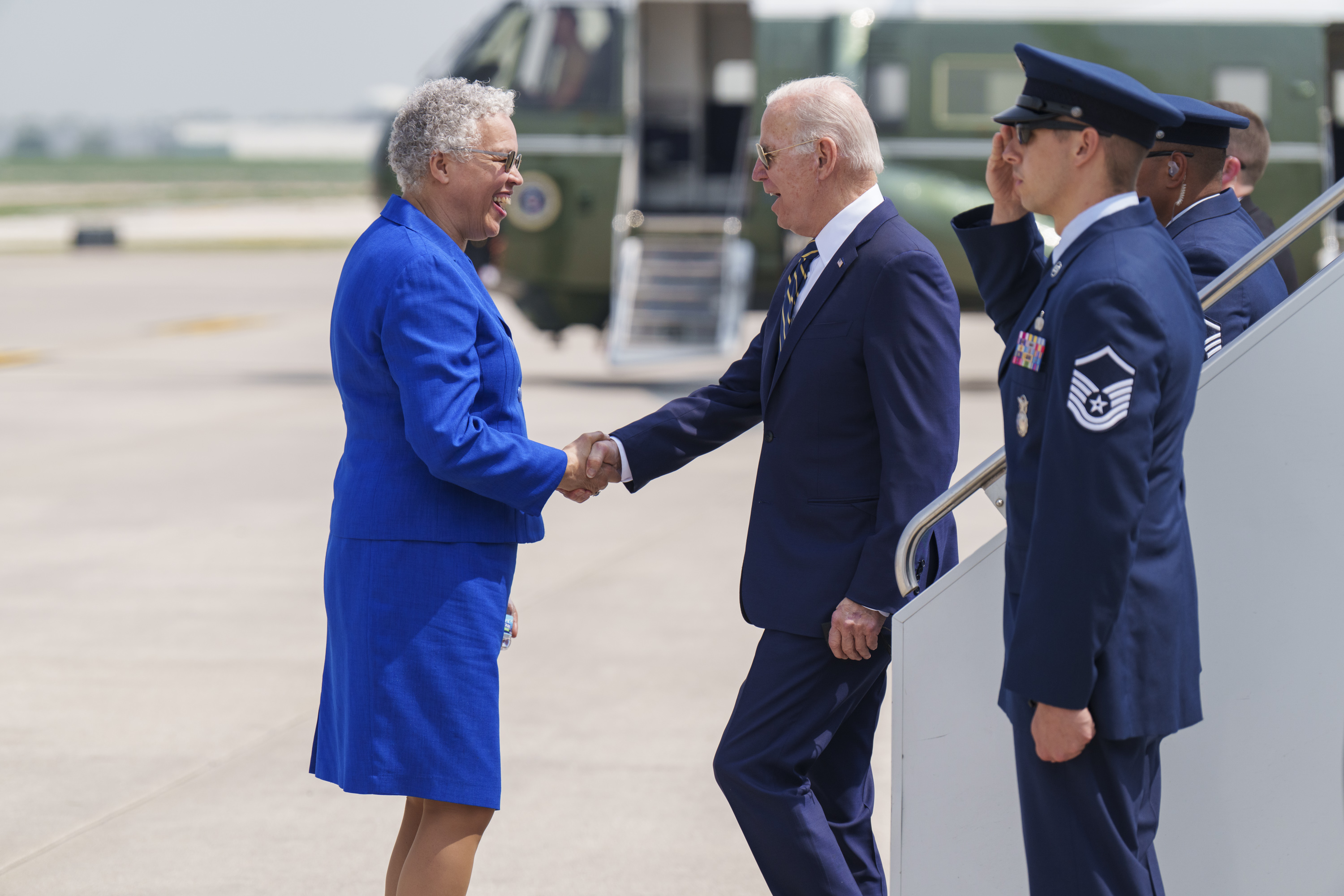
Preckwinkle (left) greets President Joe Biden in May 2022

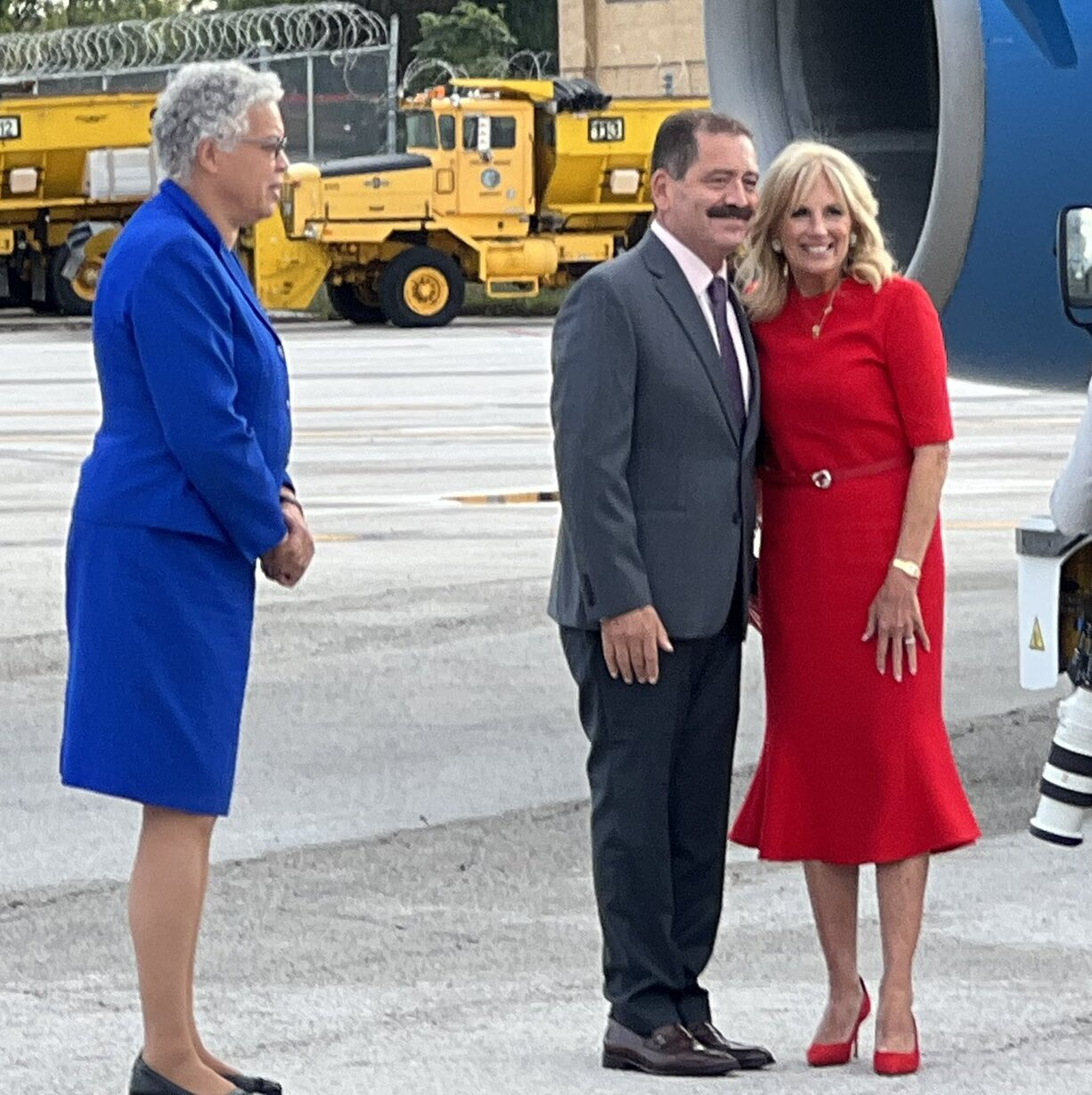
Preckwinkle (left) and Congressman Chuy García greet First Lady Jill Biden in October 2021

In January 2021, the "Fair Transit South Cook" pilot program was launched. The three-year pilot program halves the standard fares on Metra's Electric District and Rock Island District commuter services. It also expands service and frequency on Pace's Halsted 352 bus route, which provides a connection between the 95th Street CTA station and the Chicago Heights, Illinois Pace bus terminal. The effort to launch this program had been led by Preckwinkle. It is targeted at making transit more affordable and available to those residing in the southern suburbs of Chicago as well as those traveling to those suburbs. The program had an aim of addressing problems of transit access in southern Chicago communities. A mobility study had previous shown that a sizable share of residents of Southern Cook County did not have a personal automobile, spend in excess of half of their income on transit costs, and had work commutes in excess of two hours round-trips. Preckwinkle had been advancing the program since 2019. Chicago Mayor Lightfoot opposed the pilot program, alleging that it draws ridership away from the CTA Red Line. An initially cited primary goal of the program had been to increase ridership on the transit services targeted. In 2022, the pilot program's first annual report claimed that the effort had been successful. While it had not generated the increase in overall ridership than had been hoped for on the Metra services, Cook County leadership touted it as providing an important improvement in transit access for thousands of residents residing in "transit deserts". Additionally, despite an overall decline in ridership on the Metra services involved, the study showed that stations in low-income areas along the services saw an increase in ridership.

Preckwinkle advocated for adopting an integrated fare between Metra and Pace services and Chicago Transit Authority services.

=== Fourth term ===
On 25 June 2019, during a fundraiser held at the Chicago Cultural Center, Preckwinkle reversed a decision she made not to run for another term and announced that she would seek a fourth term as Cook County Board President in 2022. She was reelected to a fourth term. In the Democratic primary, Preckwinkle won a landslide victory over former Cook County Commissioner Richard Boykin. In his single term on the County Board (from 2014 through 2018), Boykin had previously fought with Preckwinkle on the matter of the "soda tax", with Boykin leading the effort that ultimately led to the tax's repeal. In 2018, Preckwinkle supported Brandon Johnson's successful campaign to unseat Boykin. In the general election, Preckwinkle again faced Bob Fioretti (who this time ran as the Republican Party's nominee) as well as Libertarian Party nominee Thea Tsatsos. Preckwinkle won 68.54% of the vote to Fioretti's 28.30% and Tsatsos's 3.16%.

For the runoff election of the 2023 Chicago mayoral election, Preckwinkle endorsed the successful candidacy of Cook County Commissioner Brandon Johnson. Johnson was generally allied with Preckwinkle as a member of the Cook County Board of Commissioners, and his initial county board campaign in 2018 also received Preckwinkle's backing.

In February 2023, Preckwinkle became co-chair of the new national organization Counties for Guaranteed Income, a group which advocates for the federal government to support universal basic income programs. In 2024, Preckwinkle personally endorsed Mariyana Spyropoulos's campaign to unseat incumbent Democrat Iris Martinez in the election for Cook County clerk of courts. The Cook County Democratic Party also endorsed Spyropoulos, who defeated Martinez in the primary for the Democratic nomination.

With Preckwinkle's support, the county board unanimously approved a resolution in December 2023 that requires most employers in suburban Cook County to provide up to 40 hours of paid leave annually to their employees. The ordinance allowed for suburban municipalities to individually opt-out of this policy. The ordinance went into effect in January 2024.

== 2019 Chicago mayoral candidacy ==
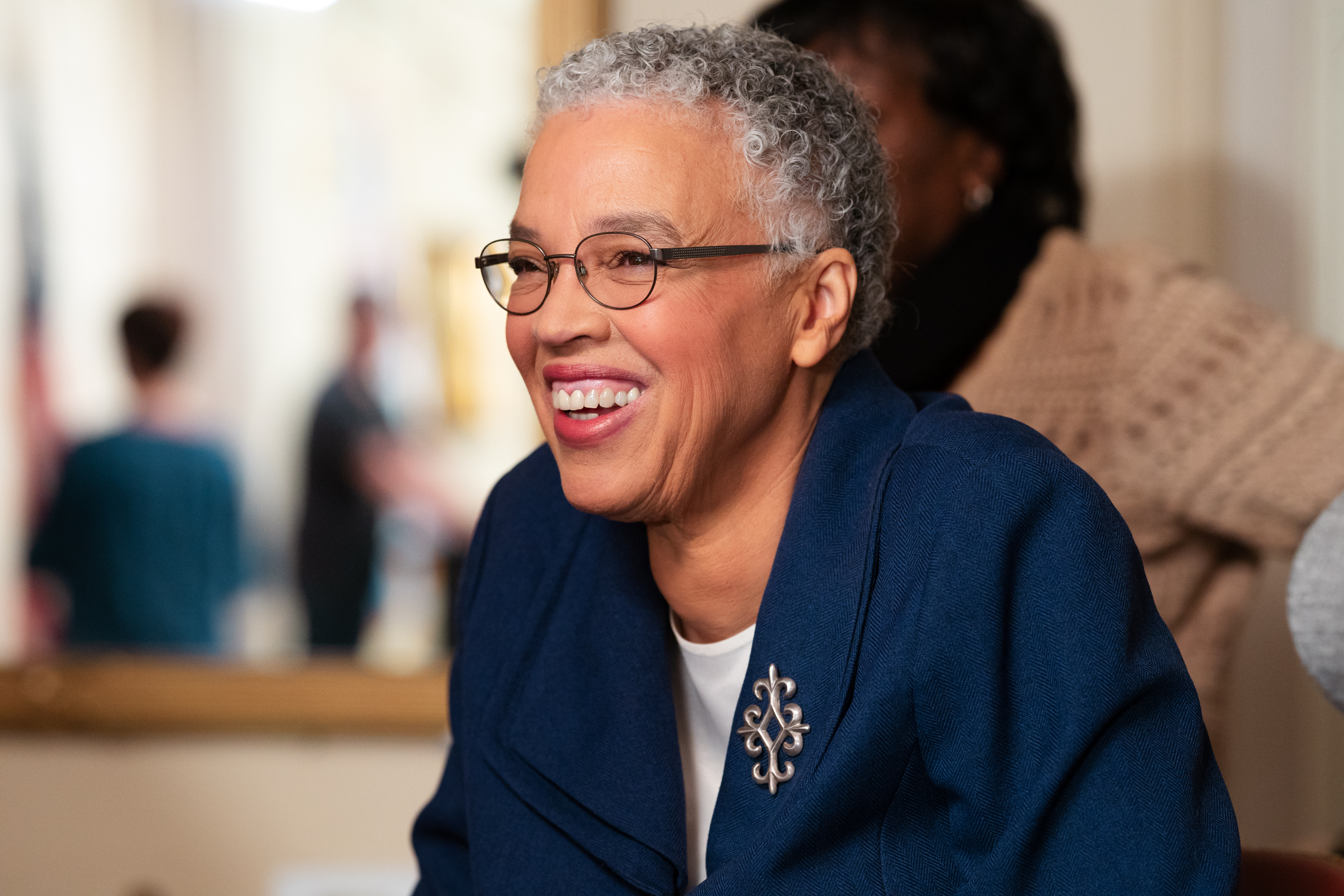
Preckwinkle in February 2019

On September 20, 2018, Preckwinkle announced her candidacy for mayor of Chicago in the 2019 election to replace Rahm Emanuel, who had recently announced his decision to not seek reelection.

Preckwinkle launched a number of challenges to the petitions of several candidates. She received criticism from other candidates for choosing to challenge candidates that were female and people of color. She launched five challenges against candidates who were women.

Preckwinkle was recognized by the public as being connected to alderman Edward M. Burke. This proved problematic for her candidacy following Burke's January 2019 indictment for corruption by the FBI. Burke had allegedly pressured fast-food executive Shoukat Dhanani to make an illegal $10,000 donation to Preckwinkle's campaign. Preckwinkle ultimately returned over $100,000 that had been raised for her campaign committee by Burke. She also called for Burke to resign from the city council. Despite denials by Preckwinkle of allegations that she had hired Burke's son as a six-figure county employee as part of a quid pro quo, Preckwinkle was proven to have previously met with Burke just prior hiring his son.

Ahead of the first round, Chicago magazine predicted that many progressive voters, expecting Bill Daley to advance to runoff and wanting a strong progressive opponent to him, might tactically vote for Preckwinkle, even those progressive voters that might also like candidates Lori Lightfoot and Amara Enyia.

Preckwinkle placed second in the primary election, narrowly behind Lightfoot and narrowly ahead of third-place finisher Daley. Because no candidate reached the necessary 50% of the vote needed to win the election outright, Preckwinkle and Lori Lightfoot advanced to a runoff election. In the runoff, both the Chicago Sun-Times and the Chicago Tribune endorsed Lightfoot. Several former candidates, including Mendoza, Chico, Paul Vallas, and fourth-place finisher Willie Wilson also endorsed Lightfoot in the runoff. In an additional blow to Preckwinkle, Chuy García, who had been previously an ally of Preckwinkle's and floor leader for her on the Cook County County Board of Commissioners, endorsed Lightfoot. Preckwinkle herself had declined to endorse García's own candidacy in the runoff of the previous 2015 Chicago Mayoral election. Lightfoot held a substantial lead over Preckwinkle in polls conducted during the runoff campaign.

In the runoff, Preckwinkle highlighted her depth of government experience and sought to emphasize a contrast with Lightfoot's lack of experience in elected office.

Lightfoot won the April 2, 2019, runoff election with more than 73% of the vote. Lightfoot won every ward of the city. Preckwinkle had only managed to beat Lightfoot in a mere 20 of the city's 2,069 voting precincts, carrying less than 1% of the city's precincts. At the request of Rev. Jesse Jackson, both Preckwinkle and Lightfoot held a unity press conference at the Rainbow/PUSH headquarters on April 3, 2019, pledging to work together and not to get in the way of each other's political careers.

== Democratic Party roles ==
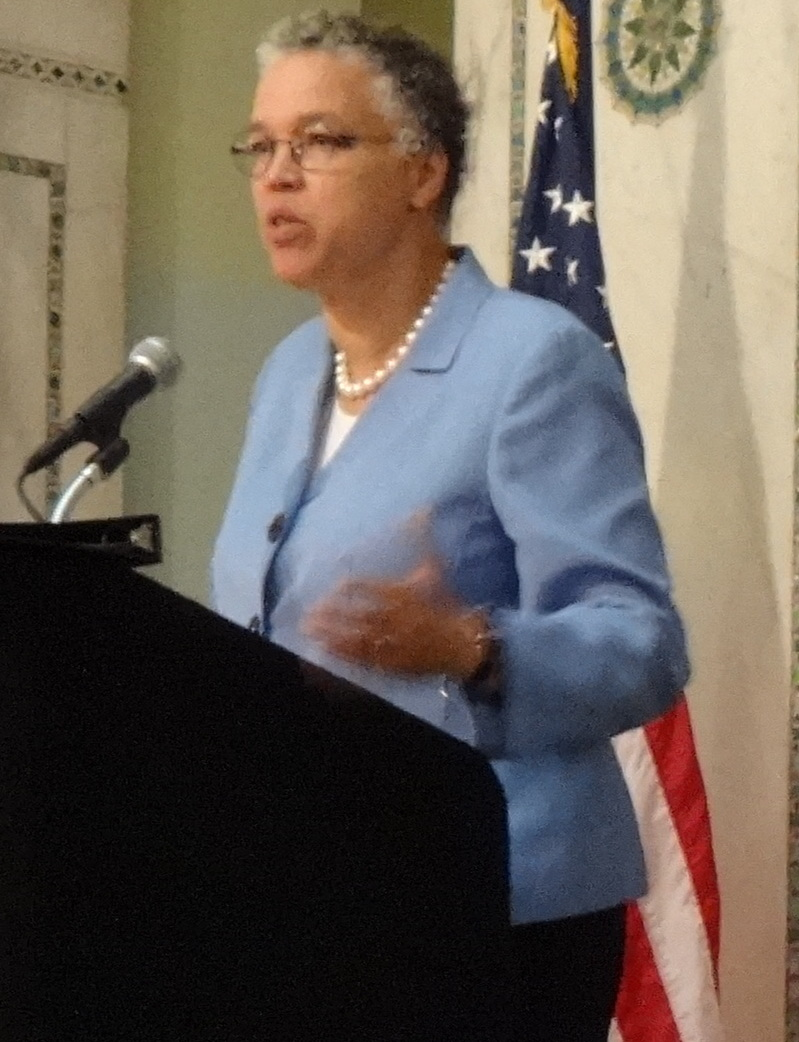
Preckwinkle speaking in 2013

=== Democratic Party Committeeman for the 4th ward (1992–2018) ===
Each of the 50 wards of the city and the 30 townships of Cook County elect a Democratic Committeeman to the Cook County Central Committee. These committeemen form the official governing body of the Cook County Democratic Party which, among other purposes, endeavors to attract, endorse, and support qualified Democratic candidates for office.

Preckwinkle succeeded Evans as 4th Ward Democratic committeeman in 1992, defeating former Evans administrative assistant Johnnie E. Hill by 6,227 to 2,327 votes in the March 17, 1992, primary election. Evans had filed nominating petitions to run for re-election as committeeman and run for judge of the Cook County Circuit Court, but withdrew his name from the ballot for committeeman in order to concentrate on the judgeship (to which he was elected). Preckwinkle was re-elected as 4th Ward Democratic committeeman on March 19, 1996, running unopposed on the ballot after her successful challenges to the nominating petitions of Charles S. Williams and her 1995 and 1999 aldermanic challenger Kwame Raoul. They were each a few dozen signatures short of the number required to earn a place on the ballot. Preckwinkle was re-elected, again running unopposed on the ballot, as 4th Ward Democratic committeeman in March 2000, March 2004, and February 2008.

On November 6, 2004, the 10 Democratic ward committeemen whose wards make up parts of the 13th Illinois legislative district, voted to appoint Kwame Raoul to the state senate seat vacated two days earlier by U.S. Senator-elect Barack Obama. 4th Ward Democratic committeeman Preckwinkle and 5th Ward Democratic committeeman Leslie Hairston had the largest says in the appointment, with 29% and 27%, respectively, of the weighted-vote based on the percentage of votes cast in each ward in the 13th legislative district for Obama in the November 5, 2002, general election.

Preckwinkle chairs the ward organization, the Fourth Ward Democratic Organization. It was among 16 Chicago Democratic ward organizations named in a complaint filed on August 31, 2005, with the Illinois State Board of Elections by the Cook County Republican Party, charging that Democratic Party ward organizations are illegally housed in city-funded neighborhood ward offices. Taxpayers fund aldermanic service centers, which are open to the general public, but state law prohibits the use of public funds by any candidate for political or campaign purposes. The complaint against Preckwinkle's ward organization was one of nine that a Hearing Officer appointed by the Board recommended proceeding to the next step of the hearing process, an Open Preliminary Hearing. On October 17, 2005, at a regularly scheduled meeting of the Board of Elections, the Board entered an executive session and voted, in a 4–4 tie, along strict party lines. It failed to adopt the recommendation of the Hearing Officer, and ordered the complaints dismissed.

The complaint against Preckwinkle's ward organization was among eight that the Cook County Republican Party appealed to the Supreme Court of Illinois. On January 23, 2009, the Illinois Supreme Court unanimously ordered the Illinois appellate court to conduct a judicial review of the Board's dismissals of the complaints.

Preckwinkle nominated Joseph Berrios for re-election as Chairman of the Democratic Party of Cook County at a meeting of the Cook County Democratic Central Committee on March 3, 2010. At the time Berrios was the incumbent chairman as well as a commissioner with the Cook County Board of Review and the Democratic candidate for Cook County Assessor. Berrios was re-elected.

In 2016, Preckwinkle was a presidential elector from Illinois.

=== Chair of the Cook County Democratic Party (2018–present) ===
Preckwinkle was elected Chair of the Cook County Democratic Party by acclamation on April 18, 2018, after then chair Joseph Berrios lost in a primary challenge as Cook County Assessor.

== Political relationship with Barack Obama ==
Preckwinkle supported Barack Obama in his political pursuits. She endorsed him in his campaigns for Illinois Senate in 1995–96, U.S. House in 1999–2000, and U.S. Senate in 2004. She was among those who encouraged Obama to make his first run for the United States Congress in 2000, taking a political risk in supporting his unsuccessful challenge to incumbent congressman Bobby Rush. She was also an early supporter when he ran for United States Senate in 2004.

When Obama was elected in 2004 as a United States Senator, Preckwinkle had a large say in his Illinois State Senate replacement. She became Obama's alderman when he moved from Hyde Park to South Kenwood in June 2005.

Preckwinkle's views on Obama were prominently featured in a July 2008 New Yorker cover story on then-presidential candidate Barack Obama's political origins. The article begins by recounting a 1995 meeting between Preckwinkle and Obama in which he discussed a possible run for the Illinois Senate seat then held by Alice Palmer. According to The New Yorker, Preckwinkle "soon became an Obama loyalist, and she stuck with him in a State Senate campaign that strained or ruptured many friendships but was ultimately successful."

In 1997, she successfully challenged the signatures of Obama's opponents in the Democratic Primary for the Illinois Senate, allowing Obama to run unopposed. According to the New Yorker article, Preckwinkle became "disenchanted" with Obama. The article's author suggested that Preckwinkle's "grievances" against Obama were motivated by her perception that Obama was disloyal. Preckwinkle still served as an Obama delegate at the 2008 Democratic National Convention.

Ahead of the Democratic Party primary in 2018 reelection election for president of the County Board of Commissioners, Obama endorsed Preckwinkle's reelection campaign. However, the following year, Obama opted not to endorse any candidate in the 2019 Chicago mayoral election. It had been reported that, during her campaign in runoff of the election, Preckwinkle had unsuccessfully sought to persuade both Barack Obama and his wife Michelle Obama to endorse her faltering candidacy. Barack Obama had not stayed neutral in the city's previous mayoral election, having endorsed Rahm Emanuel's 2015 reelection campaign.

== Electoral history ==
1983 Chicago 4th Ward aldermanic election
| Candidate | General election | | Runoff election | |
| Candidate | Votes | % | Votes | % |
|---|---|---|---|---|
| Timothy C. Evans (incumbent) | 9,396 | 46.06 | 11,023 | 56.45 |
| Toni Preckwinkle | 4,797 | 23.52 | 8,503 | 43.55 |
| Michael W. Smith | 3,389 | 16.61 | | |
| Maurice Perkins | 1,520 | 7.45 | | |
| Betty B. Booker | 501 | 2.46 | | |
| Excell Jones | 348 | 1.71 | | |
| Muhusl Fahara | 285 | 1.40 | | |
| Ronnie Terry | 162 | 0.79 | | |
| Total | 20,398 | 100 | 19,526 | 100 |
General election result is an uncertified result published in the Chicago Tribune on Feb. 24, 1983; Runoff election result is an incomplete result published in the Chicago Tribune on Apr. 13, 1983

1987 Chicago 4th Ward aldermanic election
| Candidate | Votes | % |
|---|---|---|
| Timothy C. Evans (incumbent) | 10,632 | 77.5 |
| Toni Preckwinkle | 2,771 | 20.2 |
| Excell Jones | 322 | 2.4 |
| Total votes | 13,735 | 100 |

*Uncertified results published in the Chicago Tribune on February 25, 1987

1991 Chicago 4th Ward aldermanic election
| Candidate | General election | | Runoff election | |
| Candidate | Votes | % | Votes | % |
|---|---|---|---|---|
| Toni Preckwinkle | 3,082 | 30.4 | 6,175 | 50.50 |
| Timothy C. Evans (incumbent) | 4,486 | 44.3 | 3,224 | 49.50 |
| Robert L. Lucas | 1,114 | 11.0 | | |
| William Powell | 1,068 | 10.5 | | |
| Eva Jean Jackson | 201 | 2.0 | | |
| James Fitzhugh | 175 | 1.7 | | |

1995 Chicago 4th Ward aldermanic election
| Candidate | Votes | % |
|---|---|---|
| Toni Preckwinkle (incumbent) | 6,027 | 56.6 |
| Kwame Raoul | 2,259 | 21.2 |
| Maurice Perkins | 1,795 | 16.9 |
| Brian Marshall | 563 | 5.3 |

1999 Chicago 4th Ward aldermanic election
| Candidate | Votes | % |
|---|---|---|
| Toni Preckwinkle (incumbent) | 7,069 | 60.5 |
| Charles S. Williams | 2,540 | 21.7 |
| Kwame Raoul | 2,082 | 17.8 |

2003 Chicago 4th Ward aldermanic election
| Candidate | Votes | % |
|---|---|---|
| Toni Preckwinkle (incumbent) | 6,612 | 67.90 |
| Norman H. Bolden | 3,126 | 32.10 |
| Total votes | 9,738 | 100 |

2007 Chicago 4th Ward aldermanic election
| Candidate | Votes | % |
|---|---|---|
| Toni Preckwinkle (incumbent) | 7,601 | 75.98 |
| Norman H. Bolden | 2,403 | 24.02 |
| Total votes | 10,004 | 100 |

2010 president of the Cook County Board of Commissioners Democratic primary
| Party | Candidate | Votes | % |
|---|---|---|---|
| Democratic | Toni Preckwinkle | 281,905 | 48.99 |
| Democratic | Terrence J. O'Brien | 131,896 | 22.92 |
| Democratic | Dorothy A. Brown | 83,150 | 14.45 |
| Democratic | Todd H. Stroger (incumbent) | 78,532 | 13.65 |
| Total votes | | 575,483 | 100 |

2010 President of the Cook County Board of Commissioners election
| Party | Candidate | Votes | % |
|---|---|---|---|
| Democratic | Toni Preckwinkle | 939,056 | 69.54 |
| Republican | Roger A. Keats | 357,070 | 26.44 |
| Green | Thomas Tresser | 54,273 | 4.02 |
| Total votes | | 1,350,399 | 100 |

2014 president of the Cook County Board of Commissioners Democratic primary
| Party | Candidate | Votes | % |
|---|---|---|---|
| Democratic | Toni Preckwinkle (incumbent) | 240,831 | 100 |
| Total votes | | 240,831 | 100 |

2014 President of the Cook County Board of Commissioners election
| Party | Candidate | Votes | % |
|---|---|---|---|
| Democratic | Toni Preckwinkle (incumbent) | 1,072,886 | 100 |
| Total votes | | 1,072,886 | 100 |

2018 president of the Cook County Board of Commissioners Democratic primary
| Party | Candidate | Votes | % |
|---|---|---|---|
| Democratic | Toni Preckwinkle (incumbent) | 444,943 | 60.82 |
| Democratic | Bob Fioretti | 286,675 | 39.18 |
| Total votes | | 731,618 | 100 |

2018 President of the Cook County Board of Commissioners election
| Party | Candidate | Votes | % |
|---|---|---|---|
| Democratic | Toni Preckwinkle (incumbent) | 1,355,407 | 100 |
| Total votes | | 1,355,407 | 100 |

2019 Chicago mayoral election
| Candidate | General election | | Runoff election | |
| Candidate | Votes | % | Votes | % |
|---|---|---|---|---|
| Lori Lightfoot | 97,667 | 17.54 | 386,039 | 73.70 |
| Toni Preckwinkle | 89,343 | 16.04 | 137,765 | 26.30 |
| William Daley | 82,294 | 14.78 | | |
| Willie Wilson | 59,072 | 10.61 | | |
| Susana Mendoza | 50,373 | 9.05 | | |
| Amara Enyia | 44,589 | 8.00 | | |
| Jerry Joyce | 40,099 | 7.20 | | |
| Gery Chico | 34,521 | 6.20 | | |
| Paul Vallas | 30,236 | 5.43 | | |
| Garry McCarthy | 14,784 | 2.66 | | |
| La Shawn K. Ford | 5,606 | 1.01 | | |
| Robert "Bob" Fioretti | 4,302 | 0.77 | | |
| John Kolzar | 2,349 | 0.42 | | |
| Neal Sales-Griffin | 1,523 | 0.27 | | |
| Write-ins | 86 | 0.02 | | |
| Total | 556,844 | 100 | 523,804 | 100 |

2022 president of the Cook County Board of Commissioners Democratic primary
| Party | Candidate | Votes | % |
|---|---|---|---|
| Democratic | Toni Preckwinkle (incumbent) | 374,699 | 75.76 |
| Democratic | Richard Boykin | 119,915 | 24.24 |
| Total votes | | 494,614 | 100 |

2022 President of the Cook County Board of Commissioners election
| Party | Candidate | Votes | % |
|---|---|---|---|
| Democratic | Toni Preckwinkle (incumbent) | 967,062 | 68.54 |
| Republican | Bob Fioretti | 399,339 | 28.30 |
| Libertarian | Thea Tsatsos | 44,615 | 3.16 |
| Total votes | | 1,441,016 | 100 |

== Personal life ==
From 1969 to 2013, she was married to Zeus Preckwinkle, then a seventh- and eighth-grade teacher at Ancona Montessori School. They have two children. Her former husband is European-American, and as "a lightly complexioned black woman," when she ran for city council against Evans in the 1980s, Evans and Luella Young (his precinct captain) used Preckwinkle's interracial marriage against her. Both Evans and Young are African-American.

Political offices
| Preceded by Todd Stroger | President of the Cook County Board of Commissioners; 2010–present | Incumbent |
