= Bobbie L. Steele =

President of the Cook County Board of Commissioners
- In office August 1, 2006 – December 4, 2006
- Preceded by: John Stroger
- Succeeded by: Todd Stroger

Member of the Cook County Board of Commissioners from the 2nd district
- In office 1994–2006
- Preceded by: constituency established
- Succeeded by: Robert Steele

Member of the Cook County Board of Commissioners from Chicago
- In office 1986–1994

Personal details
- Born: October 18, 1937 (age 88) Cleveland, Mississippi
- Party: Democratic
- Occupation: Politician

Bobbie L. Steele (born October 18, 1937) was sworn in as the 32nd president of the Cook County Board of Commissioners on August 1, 2006. She had been commissioner for the 2nd district of Cook County, Illinois for 20 years and served out the remainder of the current presidential term through December 4, 2006.

== Early life ==
Steele was born in Cleveland, Mississippi where she lived until she completed high school in 1954. She later attended Alabama A&M University in Huntsville, Alabama for two years.

Steele moved to Chicago's Westside in 1956 with the intention of finishing her education. In 1966, she graduated from Chicago's Teacher's College with a degree in Elementary Education. She went on to Roosevelt University where she earned her master's degree in Supervision and Administration of Education. For twenty years, Steele worked for the Chicago Public Schools.

== Public service ==
Steele was the president of the National Association of Black County Officials and Chairperson of the National Association of County Officials Deferred Compensation Advisory committee.

She is a member of the National Council of Negro Women, League of Women Voters, Lake Shore Links, Incorporated, and United Missionary Baptist Church.

== Cook County Commissioner ==
In 1986, after an urging from the late Mayor Harold Washington, Steele decided on a career change and ran successfully for the Cook County Board of Commissioners.

Her major accomplishments include introducing an amendment to Cook County's Purchasing Ordinance, which established a goal of 25% participation for minorities and 10% for women on all county purchases. She also co-sponsored Cook County's Human Rights and Ethics Ordinances. Steele introduced the ordinance renaming Cook County Hospital after then board president John H. Stroger Jr. Hospital. Early in her career, Steele had a vision to establish an on-site daycare center for county employees. This daycare center is now up and running.

More recently, Steele introduced the Cook County Re-Entry Employment Project Ordinance. This ordinance seeks to reinforce the evidence that formerly incarcerated individuals can succeed if they are employed. This ordinance is designed to provide jobs for adults who are first time non-violent offenders through Cook County government.

Steele is the longest serving African American woman in the history of Cook County. She is the only woman to serve as chairperson of the Finance Committee of the Forest Preserve District of Chicago. She is also chairperson of the Department of Corrections, Education, Contract Compliance, and Estate and Rules Committees.

In 1993, Steele was inducted into the Chicago Women's Hall of Fame.

== Cook County President ==
Steele was appointed interim Cook County Board President after former President, John Stroger suffered a severe stroke one week before the March 2006 democratic primary. Her term began on August 1, 2006 and expired on December 4, 2006. This four-month stint as interim president, and her subsequent retirement while in that position earned her an extra $67,500/year for her retirement income. Steele was quoted as saying, "I made the decision based on the fact that it was time for me to move on." John Stroger was replaced on the November ballot by his son, Todd Stroger, who won the election and succeeded Steele as President.

Steele's new position made her the first female Cook County Board President.

== Personal life ==
Commissioner Steele and her husband, Robert, have seven children and thirteen grandchildren.

Preceded by John H. Stroger	Cook County Board President; 2006	Succeeded by Todd Stroger
