= Cook County Board of Commissioners 6th district =

- District
- District 6th
- Current Board of Commissioners map, 6th district highlighted in red
- Country: United States
- State: Illinois
- County: Cook
- Townships: list: Bloom; Bremen; Bloom; Bremen; Lyons; Orland; Palos; Rich; Rich; Thornton; Worth

Government
  - Type: District
  - Body: Cook County Board of Commissioners
  - Commissioner: Donna Miller (D)

Cook County Board of Commissioners 6th district is a single-member electoral district for the Cook County Board of Commissioners. It is currently represented by Donna Miller, a Democrat.

== History ==
The district was established in 1994, when the board transitioned from holding elections in individual districts, as opposed to the previous practice of having two multi-member districts: one for ten members from the city of Chicago and another for seven members from suburban Cook County.

== Geography ==
Throughout its existence, the district has represented areas of Chicago Southland.

=== 1994 boundaries ===
When the district was first established, it represented parts of the southern suburbs of Cook County.

=== 2001 redistricting ===
New boundaries were adopted in August 2001, with redistricting taking place following the 2000 United States census.

In regards to townships, the district's redistricted boundaries included portions of the Bloom, Bremen, Lyons, Palos, Rich, Thornton, and Worth townships.

=== 2012 redistricting ===
The district, as redistricted in 2012 following the 2010 United States census, strongly resembled the geography it took in its previous, 2001, redistricting.

The district included parts of Alsip, Bedford Park, Blue Island, Bridgeview, Chicago Heights, Chicago Ridge, Country Club Hills, Crestwood, Dolton, Flossmoor, Ford Heights, Frankford, Glenwood, Homewood, Justice, Lansing, Lynwood, Matteson, Midlothian, Oak Forest, Oak Lawn, Orland Park, Orland Hills, Palos Heights, Palos Hills, Park Forest, Richton Park, Robbins, Sauk Village, South Chicago Heights, South Holland, Steger, Thornton, Tinley Park, and Worth.

In regards to townships and equivalent jurisdictions, it included portions of the Bloom, Bremen, Lyons, Orland, Palos, Rich, Thornton, and Worth townships.

The district was 119.73 square miles (76,625.33 acres).

=== 2022 redistricting ===
The district, as redistricted in 2022 following the 2020 United States census includes portions of the Bloom, Bremen, Lyons, Orland, Palos, Rich, Thornton, and Worth townships.

== Politics ==
The district, at inception, was originally regarded as a potential "swing district", feasible for either major party to win.

== List of commissioners representing the district ==
Commissioner	Party	Years	Electoral history
Barclay "Bud" Fleming	Republican	December 1994–December 1998	Elected in 1994; lost reelection in 1998,
William Moran	Democratic	December 1998–December 2002	Elected in 1998; lost reelection in 2002
Joan Patricia Murphy	Democratic	December 2002–September 18, 2016	Elected in 2002, 2006, 2010 and 2014; died in office on September 18, 2016
Edward Moody	Democratic	October 2016–December 2018	Appointed in October 2016
Donna Miller	Democratic	December 2018–present	Elected in 2018 and 2022

== Election results ==
Cook County Board of Commissioners 6th district general elections
Year	Winning candidate	Party	Vote (pct)	Opponent	Party	Vote (pct)
1994	Barclay "Bud" Fleming	Republican		Joan Patricia Murphy	Democratic	
1998	William Moran	Democratic	36,771 (50.40%)	Barclay "Bud" Fleming	Republican	36,186 (49.60%)
2002	Joan Patricia Murphy	Democratic	66,238 (100%)			
2006	Joan Patricia Murphy	Democratic	56,814 (73.93%)	Michael Hawkins	Republican	20,038 (26.07%)
2010	Joan Patricia Murphy	Democratic	54,227 (65.37%)	Sandra K Czyznikiewicz	Republican	28,727 (34.63%)
2014	Joan Patricia Murphy	Democratic	65,796 (100%)			
2018	Donna Miller	Democratic	82,556 (100%)			
2022	Donna Miller	Democratic	55,250 (68.28%)	Ana Biedrzycki	Republican	25,664 (31.72%)
