= 1994 Cook County Board of Commissioners election =

- November 8, 1994

All 17 seats on the Cook County Board of Commissioners 9 seats needed for a majority
| | First party | Second party | Third party |
|---|---|---|---|
| Party | Democratic | Republican | Harold Washington |
| Seats before | 11 | 6 | 0 |
| Seats won | 11 | 6 | 0 |
| Seat change | Steady | Steady | Steady |

The 1994 Cook County Board of Commissioners election was held on November 9, 1994. It was preceded by a primary election held on March 15, 1994. It coincided with other 1994 Cook County, Illinois, elections (including the election for president of the Cook County Board of Commissioners). It saw all seventeen seats of the Cook County Board of Commissioners up for election to four-year terms.

This was the first election for the Cook County Board of Commissioners conducted with individual districts, as previous elections had been conducted through two sets of at-large elections (one for ten seats from the city of Chicago and another for seven seats from suburban Cook County).

Six of those elected were new to the Cook County Board of Commissioners, though the number of seats that each party held remained unchanged. As of 2026, this remains the last instance in which the Democratic Party won less than 12 seats, and the last instance in which the Republican Party won more than 5 seats.

== Background and overview ==
This was the first election for the Cook County Board of Commissioners that had members elected from single-member districts. Previous elections had been conducted through two sets of at-large elections (one for ten seats from the city of Chicago and another for seven seats from suburban Cook County).

Ninety candidates filed run ahead of the primaries. Six of those that won election were new to the Cook County Board of Commissioners. The number of seats that each party won remained unchanged.

== 1st district ==
Danny K. Davis, an incumbent Democrat who had served a single term as a commissioner from Chicago at-large, was elected to the 1st district.

=== Primaries ===
==== Democratic ====
Davis faced no opponents in the Democratic primary.

Cook County Board of Commissioners 1st district Democratic primary
| Party | Candidate | Votes | % |
|---|---|---|---|
| Democratic | Danny K. Davis (redistricted incumbent) | 32,505 | 100 |
| Total votes | | 32,505 | 100 |

==== Republican ====
No candidates ran in the Republican Party primary.

==== Harold Washington Party ====
Cook County Board of Commissioners 1st district Harold Washington Party primary
| Party | Candidate | Votes | % |
|---|---|---|---|
| Harold Washington | Gwendolyn Stanford-Jones | 362 | 100 |
| Total votes | | 362 | 100 |

=== General election ===
Cook County Board of Commissioners 1st district election
| Party | Candidate | Votes | % |
|---|---|---|---|
| Democratic | Danny K. Davis (redistricted incumbent) | 42,530 | |
| Harold Washington | Gwendolyn Stanford-Jones | | |
| Total votes | | | 100 |

== 2nd district ==
Bobbie L. Steele, an incumbent Democrat who had served two-terms as a commissioner from Chicago at-large, was elected to the 2nd district.

=== Primaries ===
==== Democratic ====
Cook County Board of Commissioners 2nd district Democratic primary
| Party | Candidate | Votes | % |
|---|---|---|---|
| Democratic | Bobbie L. Steele (redistricted incumbent) | 20,954 | 69.78 |
| Democratic | James C. Taylor | 9,075 | 30.22 |
| Total votes | | 30,029 | 100 |

==== Republican ====
No candidates ran in the Republican primary.

==== Harold Washington Party ====
Cook County Board of Commissioners 2nd district Harold Washington Party primary
| Party | Candidate | Votes | % |
|---|---|---|---|
| Harold Washington | David Whitehead | 272 | 100 |
| Total votes | | 272 | 100 |

=== General election ===
Cook County Board of Commissioners 2nd district election
| Party | Candidate | Votes | % |
|---|---|---|---|
| Democratic | Bobbie L. Steele (redistricted incumbent) | 41,541 | |
| Harold Washington | David Whitehead | | |
| Total votes | | | 100 |

== 3rd district ==
Jerry Butler, an incumbent Democrat who had served as a commissioner from Chicago at-large for two terms, was elected to the 3rd district.

=== Primaries ===
==== Democratic ====
Cook County Board of Commissioners 3rd district Democratic primary
| Party | Candidate | Votes | % |
|---|---|---|---|
| Democratic | Jerry "Iceman" Butler (redistricted incumbent) | 44,085 | 100 |
| Total votes | | 44,085 | 100 |

==== Republican ====
The Republican primary was won by Clara Simms-Johnson, a child protective investigator for the Department of Children and Family Services, who ran unopposed.

Cook County Board of Commissioners 3rd district Republican primary
| Party | Candidate | Votes | % |
|---|---|---|---|
| Republican | Clara Simms-Johnson | 1,492 | 100 |
| Total votes | | 1,492 | 100 |

==== Harold Washington Party ====
No candidates ran in the Harold Washington Party primary.

=== General election ===
Cook County Board of Commissioners 3rd district election
| Party | Candidate | Votes | % |
|---|---|---|---|
| Democratic | Jerry "Iceman" Butler (redistricted incumbent) | | |
| Republican | Clara Simms-Johnson | | |
| Total votes | | | 100 |

== 4th district ==
John Stroger, an incumbent Democrat who had served six terms as a commissioner from Chicago at-large, was elected to the 4th district.

=== Primaries ===
==== Democratic ====
Cook County Board of Commissioners 4th district Democratic primary
| Party | Candidate | Votes | % |
|---|---|---|---|
| Democratic | John H. Stroger, Jr. (redistricted incumbent) | 59,209 | 100 |
| Total votes | | 59,209 | 100 |

==== Republican ====
No candidates ran in the Republican primary.

==== Harold Washington Party ====
The Harold Washington Party primary was won by Bruce Crosby, a community activist.

Cook County Board of Commissioners 4th district Harold Washington Party primary
| Party | Candidate | Votes | % |
|---|---|---|---|
| Harold Washington | Bruce Crosby | 502 | 100 |
| Total votes | | 502 | 100 |

=== General election ===
Cook County Board of Commissioners 4th district election
| Party | Candidate | Votes | % |
|---|---|---|---|
| Democratic | John H. Stroger, Jr. (redistricted incumbent) | | |
| Harold Washington | Bruce Crosby | | |
| Total votes | | | 100 |

== 5th district ==
Deborah Sims, a Democrat, was elected to the 5th district.

=== Primaries ===
==== Democratic ====
Deborah Sims defeated Governors State University political science professor Robert Donaldson in the Democratic primary.

Cook County Board of Commissioners 5th district Democratic primary
| Party | Candidate | Votes | % |
|---|---|---|---|
| Democratic | Deborah Sims | 22,959 | 63.70 |
| Democratic | Robert B. Donaldson | 13,083 | 36.30 |
| Total votes | | 36,042 | 100 |

==== Republican ====
Lawrence Ragland, an accountant, won the Republican primary.

Cook County Board of Commissioners 5th district Republican primary
| Party | Candidate | Votes | % |
|---|---|---|---|
| Republican | Lawrence M. Ragland, Jr. | 2,214 | 100 |
| Total votes | | 2,214 | 100 |

==== Harold Washington Party ====
Cook County Board of Commissioners 5th district Harold Washington Party primary
| Party | Candidate | Votes | % |
|---|---|---|---|
| Harold Washington | Elliott M. Fourte | 509 | 100 |
| Total votes | | 509 | 100 |

=== General election ===
Cook County Board of Commissioners 4th district election
| Party | Candidate | Votes | % |
|---|---|---|---|
| Democratic | Deborah Sims | | |
| Republican | Lawrence Ragland | | |
| Harold Washington | Elliott Fourte | | |
| Total votes | | | 100 |

== 6th district ==
Barclay "Bud" Fleming, a Republican, was elected to the 6th district.

=== Primaries ===
==== Democratic ====
Worth Township supervisor Joan Patricia Murphy won the Democratic primary. Joan Patricia Murphy had defeated state senator Richard F. Kelly in the Democratic primary.

Cook County Board of Commissioners 6th district Democratic primary
| Party | Candidate | Votes | % |
|---|---|---|---|
| Democratic | Joan Patricia Murphy | 10,713 | 56.21 |
| Democratic | Richard F. Kelly, Jr. | 8,347 | 43.79 |
| Total votes | | 19,060 | 100 |

==== Republican ====
Barclay "Bud" Fleming, an engineer who was the village president of Lynwood, won the Republican primary, defeating lawyer Helen Elizabeth Kelly as well as lawyer and East Hazel Crest village president Thomas Brown in the Republican primary.

Cook County Board of Commissioners 6th district Republican primary
| Party | Candidate | Votes | % |
|---|---|---|---|
| Republican | Barclay "Bud" Fleming | 6,373 | 52.55 |
| Republican | Helen Elizabeth Kelley | 3,265 | 26.92 |
| Republican | Thomas A. Brown | 7,309 | 20.53 |
| Total votes | | 16,947 | 100 |

==== Harold Washington Party ====
Cook County Board of Commissioners 6th district Harold Washington Party primary
| Party | Candidate | Votes | % |
|---|---|---|---|
| Harold Washington | Ronald Doyle | 509 | 100 |
| Total votes | | 509 | 100 |

=== General election ===
The district was regarded as a potential "swing district", with both major parties seeing a potential for victory in its election.

Cook County Board of Commissioners 6th district election
| Party | Candidate | Votes | % |
|---|---|---|---|
| Republican | Barclay "Bud" Fleming | | |
| Democratic | Joan Patricia Murphy | | |
| Total votes | | | 100 |

== 7th district ==
Joseph Mario Moreno, a Democrat, was elected to the 7th district.

=== Primaries ===
==== Democratic ====
Cook County Board of Commissioners 7th district Democratic primary
| Party | Candidate | Votes | % |
|---|---|---|---|
| Democratic | Joseph Mario Moreno | 8,550 | 38.06 |
| Democratic | Diane Rincon Carli | 6,604 | 28.62 |
| Democratic | Gary Baranowski | 4,459 | 19.33 |
| Democratic | August Sallas | 1,936 | 8.39 |
| Democratic | Gilbert G. Jimenez | 950 | 4.12 |
| Democratic | Ronald J. "Jesus" Moraza | 572 | 2.48 |
| Total votes | | 23,071 | 100 |

==== Republican ====
No candidates ran in the Republican primary.

==== Harold Washington Party ====
No candidates ran in the Harold Washington Party primary.

=== General election ===
Cook County Board of Commissioners 7th district election
| Party | Candidate | Votes | % |
|---|---|---|---|
| Democratic | Joseph Mario Moreno | | |
| Total votes | | | 100 |

== 8th district ==
Roberto Maldonado, a Democrat, was elected to the 8th district.

=== Primaries ===
==== Democratic ====
Cook County Board of Commissioners 8th district Democratic primary
| Party | Candidate | Votes | % |
|---|---|---|---|
| Democratic | Roberto Maldonado | 10,632 | 44.38 |
| Democratic | Marcial L. Torres | 5,938 | 24.79 |
| Democratic | Judith Klipowicz-Bush | 2,336 | 9.75 |
| Democratic | Philip G. Greco | 2,228 | 9.30 |
| Democratic | Margaret Cerda-Bradley | 2,137 | 8.92 |
| Democratic | Randy Scott Dienethal | 686 | 2.86 |
| Total votes | | 23,957 | 100 |

==== Republican ====
No candidates ran in the Republican primary.

==== Harold Washington Party ====
No candidates ran in the Harold Washington Party primary.

=== General election ===
Cook County Board of Commissioners 8th district election
| Party | Candidate | Votes | % |
|---|---|---|---|
| Democratic | Roberto Maldonado | | |
| Total votes | | | 100 |

== 9th district ==
Peter N. Silvestri, a Republican, was elected to the 9th district.

Domico had beaten five other candidates in the Democratic primary.

Silvestri faced no opponents in the Republican primary.

=== Primaries ===
==== Democratic ====
Marco Domico, who had served two terms as a commissioner from Chicago at-large, won the Democratic primary over seven opponents.

Cook County Board of Commissioners 9th district Democratic primary
| Party | Candidate | Votes | % |
|---|---|---|---|
| Democratic | Marco Domico (redistricted incumbent) | 11,614 | 27.22 |
| Democratic | Joan A. Sullivan | 8,928 | 20.92 |
| Democratic | Daniel E. (Dan) Burke | 7,596 | 17.80 |
| Democratic | Patricia Ann Kuta | 6,677 | 15.65 |
| Democratic | Ray Willas | 3,647 | 8.55 |
| Democratic | Kevin J. McCarthy | 3,549 | 8.32 |
| Democratic | John Lawson | 660 | 1.55 |
| Total votes | | 42,671 | 100 |

==== Republican ====
Elmwood Park village president Peter N. Silvestri won the Republican primary, running unopposed.

Cook County Board of Commissioners 9th district Republican primary
| Party | Candidate | Votes | % |
|---|---|---|---|
| Republican | Peter N. Silvestri | 7,827 | 100 |
| Total votes | | 7,827 | 100 |

==== Harold Washington Party ====
No candidates ran in the Harold Washington Party primary.

=== General election ===
This district had been regarded as a "swing district", with both major parties being seen as having a chance of winning it.

Cook County Board of Commissioners 9th district election
| Party | Candidate | Votes | % |
|---|---|---|---|
| Republican | Peter N. Silvestri | | |
| Democratic | Marco Domico (redistricted incumbent) | | |
| Total votes | | | 100 |

== 10th district ==
Maria Pappas, an incumbent Democrat who had served a single term as a commissioner from Chicago at-large, was elected to the 10th district.

=== Primaries ===
==== Democratic ====
Pappas defeated three opponents to win the Democratic primary.

Cook County Board of Commissioners 10th district Democratic primary
| Party | Candidate | Votes | % |
|---|---|---|---|
| Democratic | Maria Pappas (redistricted incumbent) | 24,029 | 61.31 |
| Democratic | Bill O'Donaghue | 8,922 | 22.76 |
| Democratic | James Patton | 4,367 | 11.14 |
| Democratic | Peter Miller | 1,875 | 4.78 |
| Total votes | | 39,193 | 100 |

==== Republican ====
Republican Party nominee John McNeal, an attorney and 48th Ward Republican committeeman, won the Republican primary, running unopposed.

Cook County Board of Commissioners 10th district Republican primary
| Party | Candidate | Votes | % |
|---|---|---|---|
| Republican | John E. McNeal | 2,868 | 100 |
| Total votes | | 2,868 | 100 |

==== Harold Washington Party ====
Cook County Board of Commissioners 10th district Harold Washington Party primary
| Party | Candidate | Votes | % |
|---|---|---|---|
| Harold Washington | Willie D. Adams | 146 | 100 |
| Total votes | | 146 | 100 |

=== General election ===
Cook County Board of Commissioners 10th district election
| Party | Candidate | Votes | % |
|---|---|---|---|
| Democratic | Maria Pappas (redistricted incumbent) | | |
| Republican | John E. McNeal | | |
| Harold Washington | Willie D. Adams | | |
| Total votes | | | 100 |

== 11th district ==
John P. Daley, an incumbent Democrat that had been appointed a commissioner from Chicago at-large in 1992, was elected to the 11th district.

=== Primaries ===
==== Democratic ====
John P. Daley defeated communications consultant Dennis Baker in the Democratic primary.

Cook County Board of Commissioners 11th district Democratic primary
| Party | Candidate | Votes | % |
|---|---|---|---|
| Democratic | John P. Daley (redistricted incumbent) | 56,083 | 85.26 |
| Democratic | Dennis Baker | 9,694 | 14.74 |
| Total votes | | 65,777 | 100 |

==== Republican ====
No candidates ran in the Republican primary.

==== Harold Washington Party ====
No candidates ran in the Harold Washington Party primary.

=== General election ===
Cook County Board of Commissioners 11th district election
| Party | Candidate | Votes | % |
|---|---|---|---|
| Democratic | John P. Daley (redistricted incumbent) | | |
| Total votes | | | 100 |

== 12th district ==
Ted Lechowicz, an incumbent Democrat who had served two terms as a commissioner from Chicago at-large, was elected to the 12th district.

=== Primaries ===
==== Democratic ====
Ted Lechowicz defeated two opponents in the Democratic primary.

Cook County Board of Commissioners 12th district Democratic primary
| Party | Candidate | Votes | % |
|---|---|---|---|
| Democratic | Thaddeus "Ted" Lechowicz (redistricted incumbent) | 28,625 | 71.53 |
| Democratic | Richard T. Bradley | 7,311 | 18.27 |
| Democratic | Amie Antero Parisi | 4,083 | 10.20 |
| Total votes | | 40,019 | 100 |

==== Republican ====
No candidates ran in the Republican primary.

==== Harold Washington Party ====
No candidates ran in the Harold Washington Party primary.

=== General election ===
Cook County Board of Commissioners 12th district election
| Party | Candidate | Votes | % |
|---|---|---|---|
| Democratic | Thaddeus "Ted" Lechowicz (redistricted incumbent) | | |
| Total votes | | | 100 |

== 13th district ==
Calvin Sutker, a Democrat, was elected to the 13th district.

=== Primaries ===
==== Democratic ====
Former state representative Calvin Sutker defeated two opponents in the Democratic primary.

Cook County Board of Commissioners 13th district Democratic primary
| Party | Candidate | Votes | % |
|---|---|---|---|
| Democratic | Calvin R. Sutker | 16,692 | 51.95 |
| Democratic | Jeff Smith | 9,875 | 30.73 |
| Democratic | Vera Tikva Paktor | 5,565 | 17.32 |
| Total votes | | 32,132 | 100 |

==== Republican ====
Lourdes Gagui Mon, an educator, won Republican primary.

Cook County Board of Commissioners 13th district Republican primary
| Party | Candidate | Votes | % |
|---|---|---|---|
| Republican | Lourdes Gagui Mon | 6,070 | 100 |
| Total votes | | 6,070 | 100 |

==== Harold Washington Party ====
No candidates ran in the Harold Washington Party primary.

=== General election ===
Cook County Board of Commissioners 13th district election
| Party | Candidate | Votes | % |
|---|---|---|---|
| Democratic | Calvin R. Sutker | | |
| Republican | Lourdes Gagui Mon | | |
| Total votes | | | 100 |

== 14th district ==
Richard Siebel, an incumbent Republican who had served several terms as a commissioner from suburban Cook County at-large, was elected to the 14th district. He defeated Democratic nominee Kelly Ann Sheehan.

In the Republican primary, Siebel defeated Palatine village president Rita Mullins.

=== Primaries ===
==== Democratic ====
No candidates ran in the Democratic primary. The Democratic Party ultimately nominated Kelly Ann Sheehan.

==== Republican ====
Cook County Board of Commissioners 14th district Republican primary
| Party | Candidate | Votes | % |
|---|---|---|---|
| Republican | Richard A. Siebel (redistricted incumbent) | 11,258 | 56.34 |
| Republican | Rita L. Mullins | 8,723 | 43.66 |
| Total votes | | 14,992 | 100 |

==== Harold Washington Party ====
No candidates ran in the Harold Washington Party primary.

=== General election ===
Cook County Board of Commissioners 14th district election
| Party | Candidate | Votes | % |
|---|---|---|---|
| Republican | Richard A. Siebel (redistricted incumbent) | 49,280 | 66.08 |
| Democratic | Kelly Ann Sheehan | 25,302 | 33.93 |
| Total votes | | 74,582 | 100 |

== 15th district ==
Carl R. Hansen, an incumbent Republican who had served five terms as a commissioner from suburban Cook County at-large, was elected to the 15th district.

=== Primaries ===
==== Democratic ====
No candidates ran in the Democratic primary.

==== Republican ====
Cook County Board of Commissioners 15th district Republican primary
| Party | Candidate | Votes | % |
|---|---|---|---|
| Republican | Carl R. Hansen (redistricted incumbent) | 10,153 | 67.72 |
| Republican | Kenneth D. Dubinski | 4,839 | 32.28 |
| Total votes | | 14,992 | 100 |

==== Harold Washington Party ====
No candidates ran in the Harold Washington Party primary.

=== General election ===
Cook County Board of Commissioners 15th district election
| Party | Candidate | Votes | % |
|---|---|---|---|
| Republican | Carl R. Hansen (redistricted incumbent) | | |
| Total votes | | | 100 |

== 16th district ==
Allan C. Carr, an incumbent Republican who had served as a commissioner from suburban Cook County at-large.

=== Primaries ===
==== Democratic ====
Attorney Tony Peraica won the Democratic primary, running unopposed.

Cook County Board of Commissioners 16th district Democratic primary
| Party | Candidate | Votes | % |
|---|---|---|---|
| Democratic | Anthony J. Peraica | 11,935 | 100 |
| Total votes | | 11,935 | 100 |

==== Republican ====
Cook County Board of Commissioners 16th district Republican primary
| Party | Candidate | Votes | % |
|---|---|---|---|
| Republican | Allan C. Carr (redistricted incumbent) | 15,839 | 100 |
| Total votes | | 15,839 | 100 |

==== Harold Washington Party ====
No candidates ran in the Harold Washington Party primary.

=== General election ===
Cook County Board of Commissioners 16th district election
| Party | Candidate | Votes | % |
|---|---|---|---|
| Republican | Allan C. Carr (redistricted incumbent) | | |
| Democratic | Anthony J. Peraica | | |
| Total votes | | | 100 |

== 17th district ==
Herb Schumann, an incumbent Republican who had served two terms as a commissioner from suburban Cook County at-large, was elected to the 17th district.

=== Primaries ===
==== Democratic ====
William Hurley, an insurance agent, won the Democratic primary, running unopposed.

Cook County Board of Commissioners 17th district Democratic primary
| Party | Candidate | Votes | % |
|---|---|---|---|
| Democratic | William M. Hurley | 5,057 | 100 |
| Total votes | | 5,057 | 100 |

==== Republican ====
Herb Schumann defeated lawyer Teressa Nuccio in the Republican primary.

Cook County Board of Commissioners 17th district Republican primary
| Party | Candidate | Votes | % |
|---|---|---|---|
| Republican | Herbert T. Schumann, Jr. (redistricted incumbent) | 9,069 | 65.53 |
| Republican | Teresa Nuccio | 4,770 | 34.47 |
| Total votes | | 13,839 | 100 |

==== General election ====
Cook County Board of Commissioners 17th district election
| Party | Candidate | Votes | % |
|---|---|---|---|
| Republican | Herbert T. Schumann, Jr. (redistricted incumbent) | 54,502 | 65.85 |
| Democratic | William M. Hurley | 28,267 | 34.15 |
| Total votes | | 82,769 | 100 |

== Summarizing statistics ==
Contest summary
| Party | Seats held before | Seats contested | Seats won |
|---|---|---|---|
| Democratic | 11 | 16 | 11 |
| Republican | 6 | 10 | 6 |
| Harold Washington | 0 | 5 | 0 |
| Total | 17 | 31 | 17 |

Contests by parties contesting
| Parties contesting | Total | Democratic wins | Republicans wins |
|---|---|---|---|
| Seats contested by Democratic, Republican, and Harold Washington nominees | 2 | 2 | 0 |
| Seats contested by Democratic and Republican nominees (no Harold Washington) | 7 | 2 | 5 |
| Seats contested by Democratic and Harold Washington nominees (no Republican) | 3 | 3 | —N/a |
| Seats contested only by Democratic nominees | 4 | 4 | —N/a |
| Seats contested only by Republican nominees | 1 | —N/a | 1 |
| Total | 17 | 11 | 6 |

Fate of incumbents
| Party | Total incumbents | Incumbents that sought reelection/retired | Incumbents that won/lost re-nomination in primaries | Incumbents that were renominated |
|---|---|---|---|---|
| Democratic | 11 | 8 sought reelection 3 retired | 8 won re-nomination 0 lost re-nomination | 7 won reelection 1 lost |
| Republican | 6 | 4 sought reelection 2 retired | 4 won re-nomination 0 lost re-nomination | 4 won reelection 0 lost |
| Harold Washington | There were no Harold Washington Party incumbents | | | |
| Total | 17 | 12 sought reelection 5 retired | 12 won re-nomination 0 lost re-nomination | 11 won reelection 1 lost |

Composition of elected board (returning/newly elected members)
| Party | Returning members | Newly elected members | Total members |
|---|---|---|---|
| Democratic | 7 | 4 | 11 |
| Republican | 4 | 2 | 6 |
| Harold Washington | 0 | 0 | 0 |
| Total | 11 | 6 | 17 |
