= Allan C. Carr =

American politician (died 2021)

Member of the Cook County Board of Commissioners from the 16th district
- In office December 1994 – December 2002
- Preceded by: Constituency established
- Succeeded by: Tony Peraica

Member of the Cook County Board of Commissioners from Suburban Cook County
- In office August 1988 – December 1994
- Preceded by: Joseph Woods
- Succeeded by: Constituency abolished

Personal details
- Born: 1929 or 1930
- Died: November 12, 2021
- Party: Republican

Allan C. Carr (c.1929–November 12, 2021) was an American politician who served as Cook County commissioner from 1988 to 2002, serving from suburban Cook County at-large from 1988–1994 and from the 16th district from 1994–2002. Before this, he served as Cicero city clerk, as well as its committeeman.

== Business career ==
Carr became a wealthy restaurant operator. He started the Steak-N-Egger chain.

== Political career ==
Carr began to engage in Cicero's politics in 1976. In 1976, he backed Christy Berkos for town president (mayor). She won as an independent, defeating the candidate of John Kimbark's Republican organization. Carr became a Cicero town trustee.

Carr later served as Cicero town clerk. He was also the head of the regular Republican organization of Cicero as its committeeman. He had been the successor of John Kimbark in these positions, and was Kimbark's chosen successor, named two days before Kimbark's death, which surprised many as they had long been strong enemies. Carr also served as Cicero's library director during this time.

In 1988, Carr was appointed to the Cook County Board of Commissioners from suburban Cook County. The six Republican commissioners from the suburbs appointed Carr to succeed retiring Commissioner Joseph Woods of Oak Park. He was reelected in 1990. He was elected to the 16th district in 1994 when the board switched to single-member constituencies, and was reelected in 1998. In 2002 he was defeated for reelection in the Republican primary by Tony Peraica. Peraica had been supported by Betty Loren-Maltese and Edward Vrdolyak, each of whom held grudges against Carr. Peraica had previously run against Carr unsuccessfully in 1994 as a Democrat.

In 1994, Betty Loren-Maltese made Carr, who up until then had been considered an ally of her and to whom she arguably owed her original election as Cicero town president, step down from his position as committeeman so that she could take his place and consolidate her control over the Town of Cicero Republican Organization.

In 2010, Carr and his family supported Democrat Jeff Tobolski's successful campaign to unseat Peraica in Carr's former seat on the Cook County Board of Commissioners.

== Personal life ==
Carr's son Terrence M. "Terry" Carr, Sr. served as the longtime mayor of Willow Springs, IllinoisAs of 2020, he was a trustee of Willow Springs and a member of the board of Pace. In April 2020, Terry's own son, Terrance M. "Terry" Carr, Jr., was sworn-in as acting mayor of McCook, Illinois.

== Electoral history ==
=== Cook County Board of Commissioners ===
1990

1990 Cook County Board of Commissioners suburban Cook County Republican primary
Party	Candidate	Votes	%
Republican	Carl R. Hansen (incumbent)	101,223	14.11
Republican	Mary M. McDonald (incumbent)	99,894	13.93
Republican	Allan C. Carr (incumbent)	95,978	13.38
Republican	Richard A. Siebel (incumbent)	94,638	13.19
Republican	Aldo A. DeAngelis	85,395	11.90
Republican	Harold L. Tyrell (incumbent)	85,003	11.85
Republican	Herbert T. Schumann, Jr. (incumbent)	84,087	11.72
Republican	William L. Russ	71,120	9.91

1990 Cook County Board of Commissioners suburban Cook County election
Party	Candidate	Votes	%
Republican	Mary M. McDonald (incumbent)	326,865	8.78
Republican	Aldo A. DeAngelis	314,466	8.44
Republican	Carl R. Hansen (incumbent)	313,917	8.43
Democratic	Richard J. Phelan	298,067	8.00
Republican	Richard A. Siebel (incumbent)	294,886	7.92
Republican	Herbert T. Schumann, Jr. (incumbent)	273,368	7.34
Republican	Allan C. Carr (incumbent)	268,823	7.22
Democratic	Patricia Kane McLaughlin	256,494	6.89
Republican	Angelo "Skip" Saviano	252,373	6.78
Democratic	Sheila H. Schultz	246,986	6.63
Democratic	Pat Capuzzi	233,521	6.27
Democratic	Thomas M. O'Donnell	225,171	6.05
Democratic	Ervin F. Kozicki	210,196	5.64
Democratic	Edward C. Reinfranck	209,290	5.62

1994

1994 Cook County Board of Commissioners 16th district Republican primary
Party	Candidate	Votes	%
Republican	Allan C. Carr (redistricted incumbent)	15,839	100
Total votes		15,839	100

1994 Cook County Board of Commissioners 16th district election
Party	Candidate	Votes	%
Republican	Allan C. Carr (redistricted incumbent)		
Democratic	Anthony J. Peraica		
Total votes			100

1998

1998 Cook County Board of Commissioners 16th district Republican primary
Party	Candidate	Votes	%
Republican	Allan C. Carr (incumbent)	13,934	100
Total votes		13,934	100

1998 Cook County Board of Commissioners 16th district election
Party	Candidate	Votes	%
Republican	Allan C. Carr (incumbent)	53,453	100
Total votes		53,453	100

2002

2002 Cook County Board of Commissioners 16th district Republican primary
Party	Candidate	Votes	%
Republican	Tony Peraica	11,813	57.46
Republican	Allan C. Carr (incumbent)	8,746	42.54
Total votes		20,559	100

=== Cicero Township committeeman ===
1986 Cicero Township Republican committeeman
Party	Candidate	Votes	%
Republican	Allan C. Carr	5,865	100
Total votes		5,865	100

1990 Cicero Township Republican committeeman
Party	Candidate	Votes	%
Republican	Allan C. Carr (incumbent)	7,358	100
Total votes		7,358	100
