= Donna Miller =

American politician (born 1965)

Member-elect of the U.S. House of Representatives from Illinois's 2nd district
- Assuming office January 3, 2027
- Succeeding: Robin Kelly

Member of the Cook County Board of Commissioners from the 6th district
- Incumbent
- Assumed office December 2018
- Preceded by: Edward Moody

Personal details
- Born: Donna Lynne Black; September 7, 1965 (age 61)
- Party: Democratic
- Spouse: David E. Miller (m. 2001)
- Children: 2
- Education: Howard University (BBA); Pepperdine University (attended)
- Website: Campaign website

Donna Lynne Miller (née Black; born September 7, 1965) is an American politician currently serving as a Cook County commissioner, representing the board's 6th district. Miller, the Democratic nominee for Illinois's 2nd congressional district, won the seat in the 2026 general election.

== Early life and career ==
Miller was born on September 7, 1965. She spent most of her youth living in Chicago.

Miller attended Ogden Elementrary in Chicago. She graduated from Lane Technical High School in 1983. She graduated from Howard University in 1987 with a bachelor degree in business administration. She later took graduate business courses at Pepperdine University in 1992.

In the fall of 2001, Miller married David E. Miller at St. Thomas Episcopal Church in Chicago. She adopted his surname.

Miller worked as a health care consultant, and account specialist. She has decades of experience in the biotech pharmaceutical healthcare industry.

Miller served on the board of Planned Parenthood Illinois beginning in 2012, serving as its board chair in 2017 and 2018. She was also a board member of Planned Parenthood Illinois Action beginning in 2012, and its board chair from 2015 through 2017.

She worked with congresswoman Robin Kelly, serving on her 2nd Congressional District Healthcare Task Force and co-chairing the Robin Kelly Annual Golf Event from 2014 through 2017.

She served as vice-president of Illinois Democratic Women, and as a legislative liaison to the Alliance of Illinois State Dental Society.

She served as a board member for the Christian Community Health Center, and as a mentor for Jobs for Youth and the MIKVA Challenge.

Miller served as a member of the Walgreens HIV Task Force, Healthcare Business Women's Association, League of Women Voters, National Sales Network, and Professional Women's Network.

She worked as director of Multi Cultural Markets with the American Heart Association.

She supported Hillary Clinton in her campaign for president in 2016, serving with Hillary Clinton Super Volunteers in from 2014 through 2016 and serving on the Illinois Clinton Leadership Team in 2015 and 2016. Miller was a member of the Democratic National Committee Rules Committee for the 2016 Democratic National Convention.

== 2012 state senate campaign ==
In 2012, Miller ran for the Democratic nomination for the 15th district of Illinois State Senate to replace outgoing state senator James Meeks. Her opponents were businessman and former NFL player Napoleon Harris and South Holland deputy village manager Patricia Mahon.

Miller received the endorsements of the Illinois AFL–CIO, two major teacher's unions, and the Democratic organizations of the Bloom and Crete townships.

Napoleon Harris ultimately won the Democratic nomination, with Miller placing second. Harris went on to win the general election unopposed.

== Cook County commissioner ==
In 2018, Miller ran for the 6th district seat on the Cook County Board of Commissioners. The seat had been filled by Edward Moody following the 2016 death in office of commissioner Joan Patricia Murphy. Moody opted not to seek election to a full term.

Miller's opponents in the Democratic primary were the deceased commissioner Murphy's daughter, Patricia Joan Murphy, and Crestwood mayor Lou Presta.

In the Democratic primary, Miller's candidacy received the endorsements of the Chicago Tribune, Chicago Sun-Times, SEIU, United Food and Commercial Workers, Democracy for America, National Association of Social Workers-Illinois Council, Danny K. Davis, Robin Kelly, Jan Schakowsky, and Raja Krishnamoorthi.

Miller's opponent Presta was endorsed by the Chicago Federation of Labor, nine democratic committeepeople, and 25 of the district's 31 mayors. Presta attracted criticism for proposing the sale of Cook County Forest Preserves land to fix the county's budget, and also attracted negative press for personal debt owed to the Internal Revenue Service.

Miller won the primary, and went on to win the general election unopposed.

In 2022 Miller was elected to a second term as Cook County commissioner, serving the 6th district.

== 2026 U.S. congressional campaign ==
On March 17, 2026, Miller secured the Democratic nomination in the Illinois' 2nd congressional district primary after defeating Jesse Jackson Jr., Robert Peters, Willie Preston and six other Democratic candidates

== Personal life ==
Miller is married to Dr. David E. Miller and has two children, sons Daniel and Donovan. Miller's husband spent a decade as an Illinois state representative. She resides in Lynwood, Illinois.

== Electoral history ==
=== Illinois State Senate ===
2012 Illinois State Senate 15th district Democratic primary
Party	Candidate	Votes	%
Democratic	Napoleon Harris	10,172	43.64
Democratic	Donna Miller	8,209	35.22
Democratic	Patricia "Pat" Mahon	4,928	21.14
Total votes		23,309	100

=== Cook County Board of Commissioners ===
2018 Cook County Board of Commissioners 6th district Democratic primary
Party	Candidate	Votes	%
Democratic	Donna Miller	17,907	43.38
Democratic	Patricia Joan Murphy	16,762	40.61
Democratic	Louis Presta	6,611	16.02
Total votes		41,280	100

2018 Cook County Board of Commissioners 6th district election
Party	Candidate	Votes	%
Democratic	Donna Miller	82,556	100
Total votes		82,556	100

U.S. House of Representatives
Preceded by Robin Kelly	Member of the U.S. House of Representatives from Illinois's 2nd congressional district Taking office 2027	Elect
