= Anita Alvarez =

American politician (born 1960)

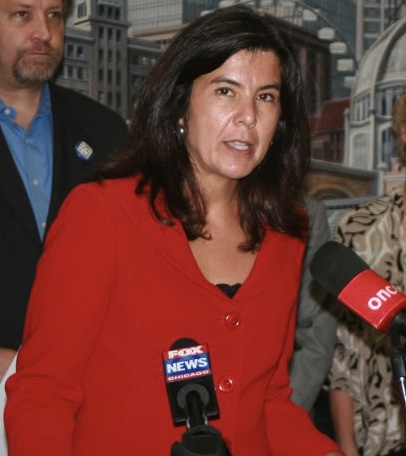

Cook County State's Attorney
- In office December 1, 2008 – December 1, 2016
- Preceded by: Dick Devine
- Succeeded by: Kim Foxx

Personal details
- Born: January 16, 1960 (age 66) Chicago, Illinois, U.S.
- Party: Democratic
- Education: Loyola University Chicago (BS); Illinois Institute of Technology (JD)

Anita M. Alvarez (born January 16, 1960) is the former State's Attorney for Cook County, Illinois, United States. Alvarez was the first Hispanic woman elected to this position, after being the first Latina to win the Democratic nomination for state's attorney of Cook County.

== Background ==
A Chicago native, Alvarez was born and raised in the Pilsen neighborhood. She attended Maria High School and received her undergraduate degree from Loyola University of Chicago in 1982. She earned her J.D. degree from Chicago-Kent College of Law in 1986.

Alvarez began her career as an Assistant State's Attorney in 1986. She has argued before the Illinois Appellate Court and tried more than 50 felony jury trials. Prior to entering the race for Cook County State's Attorney, she served as Chief Deputy State's Attorney; Chief of Staff to the Cook County State's Attorney; Chief of the Special Prosecutions Bureau; Deputy Chief of the Narcotics Bureau, and Supervisor of the Public Integrity Unit. She also spent 3½ years in the Gang Crimes Unit where she prosecuted gang-related homicides.

Alvarez was promoted to the Supervisor of the Public Integrity Unit in 1996, where she was responsible for prosecuting city, county, and state employees who committed felonies and violated the public trust. She claimed to have tried police officers on corruption charges. In 1999, she was promoted to Deputy Chief of the Narcotics Bureau where she supervised the prosecution of drug cases as well as long-term narcotics investigations in conjunction with Chicago and suburban police departments.

In 2001, Alvarez tried the case of the People of the State of Illinois v. Patrick Sykes, which was referred to in the media as the "Girl X Case". Alvarez's successful prosecution of Sykes resulted in his conviction for the predatory criminal sexual assault of a 9-year-old girl who was left paralyzed, blind, and without speech after the brutal attack in the Cabrini Green housing project. Alvarez was elected Cook County State's Attorney in 2008. She was the first female, first Hispanic and first career prosecutor ever elected to this position.

== State's Attorney ==
Alvarez was elected Cook County State's Attorney in 2008. She won reelection in 2012. She ran for reelection again in 2016, but was defeated in the primary election by Kim Foxx.

During her first five years in office, Alvarez drafted a law that increased criminal penalties for gang members arrested with guns. Gang members convicted under the new law face a mandatory prison sentence and are no longer eligible for parole.

She created a Human Trafficking Initiative that works closely with local, state and federal law enforcement agencies to crack down on individuals and human trafficking groups. Alvarez also authored the Illinois Safe Children Act, a sweeping new law that enhanced protections for juveniles caught in the sex trade and provides new legal tools for police and prosecutors to target those who prostitute children.

Alvarez was interviewed in a 2012 60 Minutes segment "Chicago: The False Confession Capital", in which she defended police conduct in two cases involving false confessions which were vacated by the courts which issued certificates of innocence to the defendants. Despite the courts' actions and the lack of DNA evidence, Alvarez said in the interview, "I don't know whether he committed the crime or not. There are still unanswered questions in both of these cases that I couldn't sit here and tell you today that they're all guilty or they're all innocent." She admits that in one of the rape cases, they did not find any of the boys' DNA on the victim or in the basement of the house where the crime occurred. In the other case, that of the Dixmoor 5, the DNA found was matched to a convicted rapist. Peter Neufeld, of The Innocence Project says prosecutors rejected the new evidence and suggested necrophilia (having sex with a dead person) as a possible explanation for why a convicted rapist's DNA may have come in contact with the victim, to which Alvarez replied, "It's possible. We have seen cases like that."

Alvarez defended Cook County Assessor Joseph Berrios in a suit against Berrios filed in 2001 by Cook County Inspector General Patrick Blanchard. Blanchard was seeking a response from Berrios to a subpoena requesting documents related to a manager in Berrios' office obtaining two exemptions intended for a primary residence. Berrios ignored the subpoena, claiming that the County Inspector General had no authority over him.

=== Eavesdropping prosecutions ===
While in office, Alvarez more than once prosecuted citizens with felony eavesdropping for recording encounters with police.

In 2009, Chris Drew recorded his non-violent arrest for street peddling of art. The peddling charge was dropped and Alvarez pursued the much harsher charge of recording police officers' voices without their permission.

In 2010, Tiawanda Moore sought to file a complaint against a police officer for groping her, and secretly recorded an interview with investigators on her smartphone, on the grounds that they were trying to intimidate her. Alvarez charged her with a Class 1 felony eavesdropping. Moore was acquitted in 2011, with one juror saying that the trial had been "a waste of time".

Both defendants faced a sentence of up to 15 years in prison.

Judge Stanley Sacks dismissed Drew's case on March 2, 2012, stating the eavesdropping law was unconstitutional and that it was too broad and criminalized innocent behavior. Alvarez announced she would appeal the ruling. The American Civil Liberties Union of Illinois successfully sued Alvarez and she was ordered to cease prosecuting ACLU employees and their agents under the Illinois Eavesdropping Act.

Judge Sharon Johnson Coleman ruled that the Illinois Eavesdropping Act, 720 ILCS 5/14, violated the First Amendment of the United States Constitution when used as a method to prevent the open recording of law enforcement's audible communications in public places while performing official duties, or the communications of others that are incidentally captured. It was ruled that Cook County would have to pay the ACLU's legal fees, which amounted to $645,549.

In 2013, during a routine review of his case, she concluded that Lathierial Boyd, a man who had already served 23 years for murder, should never have been charged.

=== Rekia Boyd controversy ===
In 2013, Alvarez's office charged Dante Servin, the police officer who shot Rekia Boyd, with involuntary manslaughter. In 2015, Servin was cleared of all charges by the presiding judge, who pointed to the inconsistent charges as the reason for his decision. Alavarez was heavily criticized for undercharging Servin, and his consequent acquittal, which some critics alleged was an attempt by Alvarez to curry favor with the police department.

=== Laquan McDonald controversy ===
In the wake of the release of video of the murder of Laquan McDonald, protestors and Chicago politicians called on Alvarez to resign for having waited 13 months to prosecute police officer Jason Van Dyke.

The video shows officer Jason Van Dyke shooting a black teenager 16 times as the teenager walks away. Based on the video, it is believed that at least three of the shots struck McDonald's body as he lay motionless on the ground, conflicting with police reports of the incident. Alvarez refused to resign, but on March 15, 2016, lost her re-election bid in the Democratic primary.

=== Minors in solitary confinement controversy ===
Another controversial case was a Wicker Park shooting of a homeless man, Sammy Tate, involving two falsely accused black minors. Alvarez approved the keeping of a 15-year-old minor (Deandre Washington) in solitary confinement in Cook County Jail for 4 years pending trial. The trial lasted 45 minutes in 2003 where both defendants were acquitted. Alvarez also refused to resign when asked, yet settled suit against the city in 2012 for malicious prosecution by local Cochran offices for $1 million. At a 2018 Chicago City Club event, Alvarez's then-press agent still defended the ex-Cook County State's Attorney for not knowing how many minors were kept in solitary confinement during her term in office.

== Electoral history ==
- 2008 Democratic Primary

2008 Democratic Primary for the Office for Cook County State's Attorney
Candidate	Votes	Percentage
Anita Alvarez	244,538	25.73%
Tom Allen	234,976	24.72%
Howard B. Brookins Jr.	172,746	18.18%
Larry Suffredin	210,381	22.14%
Robert J. Milan	55,350	5.82%
Tommy H. Brewer	32,430	3.41%

- 2008 General Election

Anita Alvarez was elected as Cook County State's Attorney in November 2008. Alvarez faced two challengers from both the Republican and Green Party in November 2008's general election. The two challengers were Cook County Commissioner for the 16th district Tony Peraica, and the Green Party's Thomas O'Brien.

- 2012 General Election

Alvarez was reelected to a second term as Cook County State's Attorney in 2012 after defeating Republican challenger Lori Yokoyama. Alvarez won 77% of the vote.

- 2016 Democratic primary

Alvarez ran for reelection in 2016. Her opponents in the Democratic primary included former Cook County assistant state's attorney Kim Foxx and former federal and state prosecutor Donna More. On January 14, the Cook County Democratic Party endorsed Foxx for state's attorney. Alvarez lost the Democratic primary for state's attorney's race to Foxx on March 15, 2016 and called Foxx and conceded at approximately 9:00 p.m.

2016 Democratic Primary for the Office for Cook County State's Attorney

=== Results ===
Democratic primary results
Party	Candidate	Votes	%
Democratic	Kim Foxx	645,738	58.3%
Democratic	Anita Alvarez (Incumbent)	317,594	28.7%
Democratic	Donna More	144,063	13.8%
Total votes		1,107,395	100.0%

== Personal life ==
Alvarez was married to Dr. James Gomez until May 2021. She has four children. Alvarez resides with her family in River Forest, Illinois.
