= Frank Aguilar =

American politician

Member of the Cook County Board of Commissioners from the 16th district
- Incumbent
- Assumed office April 20, 2020
- Preceded by: Jeff Tobolski

Member of the Illinois House of Representatives from the 24th district
- In office January 2003 – January 2005
- Preceded by: Donne Trotter (redistricted)
- Succeeded by: Michelle Chavez

Personal details
- Born: November 26, 1960 (age 65) Chicago, Illinois, U.S.
- Party: Republican (before 2020); Democratic (2020–present)
- Education: Loyola University Chicago (BA); Roosevelt University (MPA); DePaul University (attended)

Frank J. Aguilar is a politician currently serving as the member of the Cook County Board of Commissioners from the 16th district. Currently a Democrat, he previously was a member of the Republican Party, under which he served as a member of the Illinois House of Representatives representing the 24th district from 2002 to 2004.

== Career ==
Aguilar served as a Republican member of the Illinois House of Representatives representing the 24th district from 2002 to 2004, becoming the only Hispanic American of his party in the General Assembly. Aguilar was defeated in 2004 by Democrat Michelle Chavez in a race that was thought to be non-competitive. It has been alleged that Aguilar had originally asked Chavez, a friend of his, to run for the Democratic so that she could be a "ghost candidate" as Aguilar's general election opponent, hoping to ensure that Aguilar would have an easy reelection race. Chavez unexpectedly beat Aguilar in the general election.

Aguilar later served as an elected member of the Morton College Board of Trustees.

On April 16, 2020, now a Democrat, he was appointed to the Cook County Board of Commissioners to succeed Jeff Tobolski.

== Personal life ==
His brother, John Aguilar, is also active in Republican politics in the northern Illinois area, and has served as a Township Trustee in Aurora Township, Illinois.

== Electoral history ==
- 2002 General election
  - Frank Aguilar (R) 53.59%
  - Elizabeth "Lisa" Hernandez (D) 46.41%
- 2004 General election
  - Michelle Chavez (D) 53.24%
  - Frank Aguiar (R) 46.76%
