= Flora Ciarlo =

American politician

Member of the Illinois House of Representatives from the 80th district
- In office 1995–1996

Personal details
- Born: September 2, 1936 (age 90) Harvey, Illinois, U.S.
- Party: Republican
- Children: 3
- Education: National College of Education (BS)
- Profession: Politician

Flora L. Ciarlo (born September 2, 1936) was an American politician.

Ciarlo was born September 2, 1936, in Harvey, Illinois. Ciarlo received her bachelor's degree in education from the National College of Education. She worked as a teacher for Steger School District 194 and a program manager for Bloom Township High School District 206. She was a member of the Board of Trustees for Prairie State College.

Ciarlo, a resident of Steger, Illinois, was elected as a Republican to the Illinois House of Representatives from the 80th District in 1994. She served on the Committees on Aging; Cities & Villages; Commerce, Industry & Labor; Elementary & Secondary Education. She was defeated for reelection by Democratic candidate George F. Scully, Jr. in the 1996 general election. After the election, Ciarlo was hired by the Illinois Department of Commerce and Economic Opportunity. In 1998, Ciarlo ran for the Illinois Senate against incumbent Democrat Debbie Halvorson.

Flora Ciarlo now lives in Sarasota, Florida along with two of her children, and two of her grandchildren.
