= Cook County Board of Commissioners 16th district =

- District
- District 16
- Current Board of Commissioners map, 16th district highlighted in red
- Country: United States
- State: Illinois
- County: Cook
- Townships: list: Berwyn; Cicero; Leyden; Lyons; Riverside; Stickney

Government
  - Type: District
  - Body: Cook County Board of Commissioners
  - Commissioner: Frank Aguilar (D)

Cook County Board of Commissioners 16th district is a single-member electoral district for the Cook County Board of Commissioners. It is currently represented by Frank Aguilar, a Democrat.

== History ==
The district was established in 1994, when the board transitioned from holding elections in individual districts, as opposed to the previous practice of having two multi-member districts: one for ten members from the city of Chicago and another for seven members from suburban Cook County.

== Geography ==
=== 1994 boundaries ===
When the district was first established, it covered part of the western suburbs of Cook County and a small portion of Chicago.

The district was bizarrely shaped. It stretched from Wheeling Township (about ten miles north of O'Hare International Airport) to the county line with Will County, the two points being 42 miles apart. For much of its length, the district was only one-mile wide. At some points it was narrower. The small portion of Chicago in the district contained O'Hare International Airport.

=== 2001 redistricting ===
New boundaries were adopted in August 2001, with redistricting taking place following the 2000 United States census.

In regards to townships, the district's redistricted boundaries included portions of Berwyn, Cicero, Leyden, Lyons, Proviso, Stickney townships.

=== 2012 redistricting ===
The district, as redistricted in 2012 following the 2010 United States census, included parts of Beford Park, Bellwood, Berkely, Berwyn, Bridgeview, Broadview, Brookfield, Chicago, Cicero, Countryside, Forest View, Franklin Park, Hodgkins, Hillside, Justice, La Grange, La Grange Park, Lyons, Maywood, McCook, Melrose Park, North Riverside, Stickney, Northlake, Riverside, Stone Park, Summit, and Westchester.

In regards to townships and equivalent jurisdictions, it included portions of the city of Chicago, as well as portions of Berwyn, Cicero, Leyden, Lyons, Proviso, Riverside, Stickney townships.

The district was 46.77 square miles (29,932.44 acres).

=== 2022 redistricting ===
The district as redistricted in 2022, following the 2020 United States census, contains portions of Berwyn, Cicero, Leyden, Lyons, Riverside, and Stickney Townships.

== List of commissioners representing the district ==
| Commissioner | Party | Years | Electoral history |
|---|---|---|---|
| Allan C. Carr | Republican | December 1994–December 2002 | Previously served as commissioner from suburban Cook County at-large; elected in 1994 and 1998; lost reelection in 2002 |
| Tony Peraica | Republican | December 2002–December 2010 | Elected in 2002 and 2006; lost reelection in 2010 |
| Jeff Tobolski | Democratic | December 2010–March 31, 2020 | Elected in 2010, 2014, 2018; resigned in March 2020 |
| Frank Aguilar | Democratic | April 20, 2020–present | Appointed in April 2020; elected in 2022 |

== Election results ==
Cook County Board of Commissioners 16th district general elections
| Year | Winning candidate | Party | Vote (pct) | Opponent | Party | Vote (pct) | Opponent | Party | Vote (pct) |
| 1994 | Allan C. Carr | Republican | | Tony Peraica | Democratic | | | | |
| 1998 | Allan C. Carr | Republican | 53,453 (100%) | | | | | | |
| 2002 | Tony Peraica | Republican | 38,858 (53.14%) | Ronald M. Serpico Sr. | Democratic | 34,262 (46.86%) | | | |
| 2006 | Tony Peraica | Republican | 35,605 (51.04%) | William Edward Gomolinski | Democratic | 34,154 (48.96%) | | | |
| 2010 | Jeff Tobolski | Democratic | 34,298 (50.67%) | Tony Peraica | Republican | 28,661 (42.34%) | Alejandro Reyes | Green | 4,735 (6.99%) |
| 2014 | Jeff Tobolski | Democratic | 34,910 (100%) | | | | | | |
| 2018 | Jeff Tobolski | Democratic | 54,322 (100%) | | | | | | |
| 2022 | Frank J. Aguilar | Democratic | 38,100 (67.75%) | Kimberly Jagielski | Republican | 18,138 (32.25%) | | | |
