= Elim Christian Services =

Christian organization

Elim Christian Services, is a Christian ministry, based in the southwest suburbs of Chicago, Illinois, that serves individuals with disabilities. Elim's east campus and west campus are located in Crestwood, Illinois, and its South campus is located in Orland Park, Illinois. Elim's Christ-centered programs include a special education program, a vocational and day program for adults with disabilities, and a learning program that trains Elim staff and partners with other educational organizations or ministries serving individuals with disabilities nationally and internationally. The school was founded in 1948 by Dutch Reformed church members. Elim holds an annual Dutch festival and fundraiser.
