= Crestwood Public Library =

Library in Crestwood, Illinois, US

- 41°38′47.76″N 87°44′39.12″W
- Established: 1969

Access and use
- Population served: 9,842

Other information
- Director: Dan Powers
- Website: www.crestwoodlibrary.org

Crestwood Public Library is located in the village of Crestwood, Illinois, a south suburb of Chicago.

The Crestwood Public Library was first located at the old Willow Creek School in District 129. The Willow Creek School was popular in the early 1900s, holding many elementary school graduations, but had become abandoned and neglected as the years passed.

In 1969, the building was leased from School District 130, and renovated with the help of a number of volunteers and generous donations from the Village businessmen and organizations. The building was officially dedicated by Lt. Governor Paul Simon and operated by the Village residents. Known as "The Little School House", it served as the Village library until January 16, 1973, when 2/3 of the building and a total of 4,000 books were destroyed due to a suspected act of arson. The library reopened two more times following the fire: once in November 1973 in the Public Works Building, and a second time in April 1974 in the Council Chambers in the Crestwood Village Hall.

It remained there for a period of time until it moved once again to a more established location on 135th street between Central Avenue and Cicero Avenue in August 1987. The first renovation and expansion of this building was completed in January 1995. There are, however, current plans to make more renovation and expansion changes to the library in 2011.

The Crestwood Public Library is a member of the Metropolitan Library System and enables registered patrons to borrow books, films, music, and other materials. There are also a variety of programs for children and families to participate in and attend.
