= Edward Moody =

American politician

Cook County Recorder of Deeds
- In office December 4, 2018 – December 7, 2020
- Preceded by: Karen Yarbrough
- Succeeded by: Office abolished

Cook County Commissioner from the 6th district
- In office October 2016 – December 2018
- Preceded by: Joan Patricia Murphy
- Succeeded by: Donna Miller

Personal details
- Born: 1964 or 1965
- Political party: Democratic

Edward M. Moody is an American politician who formerly served as Cook County recorder of deeds. He was appointed in December 2018, and served until the office was abolished in December 2020. From October 2016 through December 2018, he served as Cook County Commissioner from the 6th district. Before 2016, he served as a Worth Township highway commissioner.

== Early life ==
Moody and twin brother Fred were born in either 1964 or 1965. When they were 14 years old, their mother died. Their father was an alcoholic.

== Early political career ==
Moody and his twin brother Fred joined the 13th Ward Democrats, where they campaigned for Michael Madigan and other candidates. Over the years, the Moody twins would come to be considered to be among Michael Madigan's most effective and loyal operatives. The twins said, in a 2016 interview, that they regarded Madigan as a father figure.

Moody worked as a precinct captain under Worth Township committeeperson and Illinois state representative Harry Yourell.

Moody served as president of Chicago Ridge School District 127.5, and president of the governing board for the Eisenhower Special Education Co-op. Moody served as a Worth Township highway commissioner. Moody served as the chairman of the Worth Township Fair Housing Committee. He also served as a court coordinator for the office of Chief Judge of the Circuit Court of Cook County Timothy C. Evans.

== Cook County Board of Commissioners ==
After the death in office of Joan Patricia Murphy, Moody was appointed in October 2016 to replace her by a vote of the democratic committee of the 6th district of the Cook County Board of Commissioners. He was unanimously chosen by the committee. He had been one of seven individuals that had put themselves forward as candidates to fill the vacancy.

Moody did not seek election to a full term in 2018. Before he dropped-out, he had already seen challengers since announced by three individuals, largely due to his support of president of the Cook County Board of Commissioners Toni Preckwinkle's controversial tax on sweetened beverages.

== Cook County Recorder of Deeds ==
After Karen Yarbrough resigned December 3, 2018 as Cook County recorder of deeds in order to assume the office of Cook County clerk, Moody was appointed by the Cook County Board of Commissioners on December 4, 2018 to replace her as Cook County recorder of deeds. His appointment had been backed by Michael Madigan.

Moody served until December 7, 2020, when the office ceased to exist, having been formally merged with the office of Cook County clerk, as per a 2016 referendum.

== ComEd scandal ==
In 2020, Moody's became one of a number of Michael Madigan allies that were implicated as beneficiaries of a bribery scheme involving Commonwealth Edison (ComEd). Internal emails released by ComEd on November 25, showed Moody to have had secret communications with the energy provider that were arranged by two lobbyists that had been indicted.
