= Ronnie Mosley =

American politician

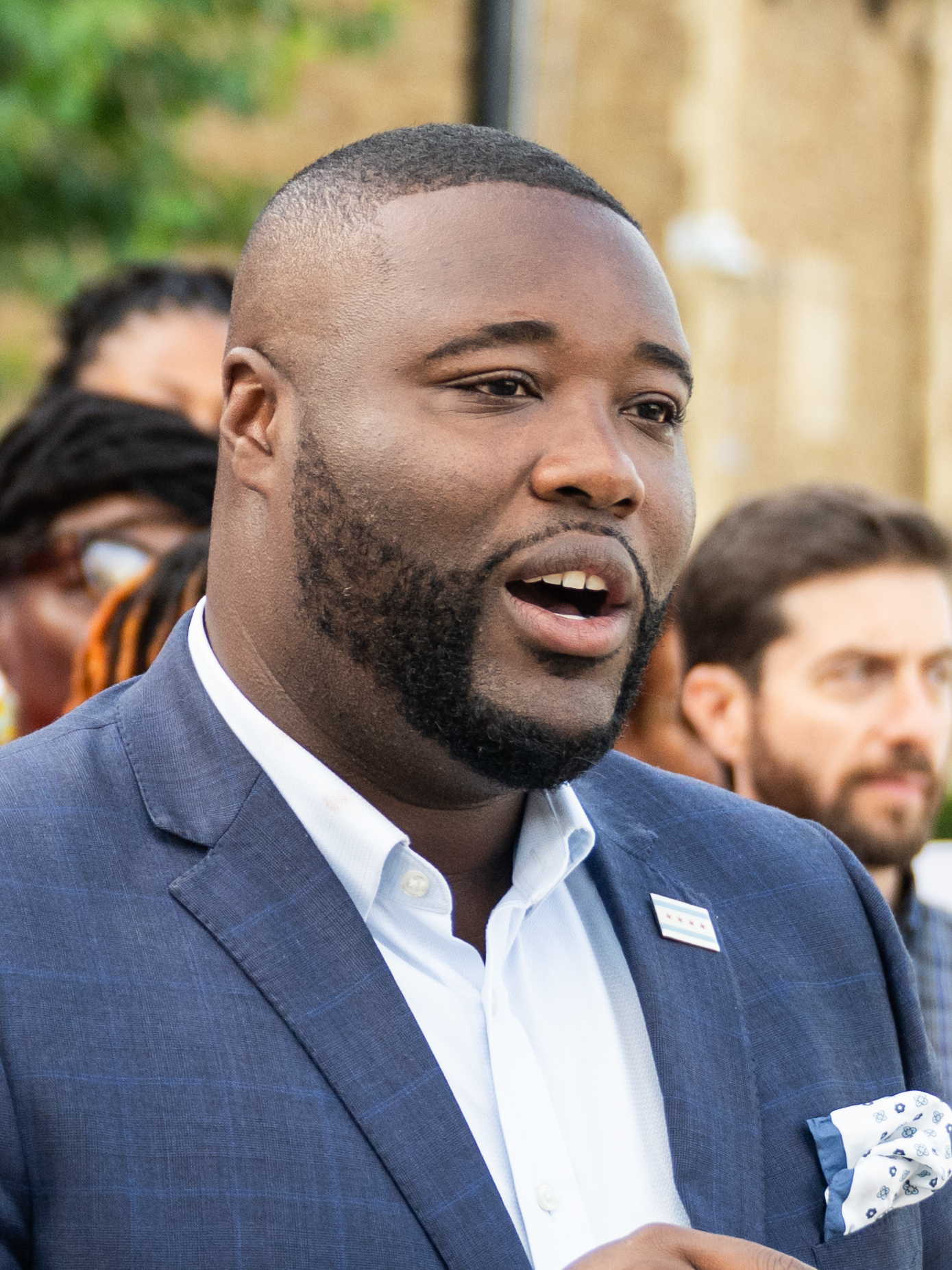
- Mosley in 2025

Member of the Chicago City Council from the 21st ward
- Incumbent
- Assumed office May 15, 2023
- Preceded by: Howard Brookins

Personal details
- Born: August 21, 1991 (age 34)
- Party: Democratic
- Education: Morehouse College

Ronnie Mosley (born August 21, 1991) is an American politician from Chicago. He is the alderperson for Chicago City Council's 21st ward, having won the 2023 election to the office. The 21st ward includes parts of the Washington Heights, West Pullman, and Morgan Park neighborhoods.

== Early life, education, and career ==
Mosley grew up in the Auburn Gresham neighborhood of Chicago, and attended Simeon High School. After his friend was shot and killed in 2007, he began organizing protests on the issue of gun violence. In 2009, he enrolled in Morehouse College, but did not complete his undergraduate degree after several years of on-and-off attendance due to struggles with tuition. At Morehouse, he was involved in a unionization effort among cafeteria workers.

Mosley worked in 8th ward Alderwoman Michelle A. Harris's office from 2015 to 2017. In 2017, he launched a consulting firm.

In 2022, Mosley launched his campaign in the 2023 election for 21st ward alderperson, to replace the retiring Howard Brookins. Mosley received endorsements from Brookins, Alderwoman Michelle A. Harris, Governor J. B. Pritzker, and City Clerk Anna M. Valencia. He placed first in the general election in February 2023, winning 24.7% of the vote, and proceeded to the runoff election against Cornell Dantzler. He won the April runoff election against Dantzler with 52% of the vote. Upon his election, he became the youngest member of City Council at age 31.

== Personal life ==
Mosley has lived in Washington Heights since 2018. He and his wife, Taylor, were married in 2019.

== See also ==
- List of Chicago alderpersons since 1923
