= George Scully Jr. =

American politician

Judge of the Circuit Court of Cook County from the 15th Judicial Subcircuit
- In office February 27, 2009 – July 2016
- Succeeded by: Michael B. Barrett

Member of the Illinois House of Representatives from the 80th district
- In office January 8, 1997 – February 26, 2009
- Preceded by: Flora Ciarlo
- Succeeded by: Anthony DeLuca

Personal details
- Born: February 28, 1952 (age 74) Evergreen Park, Illinois
- Party: Democratic
- Spouse: Barbara
- Education: Northern Illinois University (B.S.); John Marshall Law School (J.D.)
- Profession: Judge

George F. Scully Jr. (born February 28, 1952) is an Assistant Professor of Business Law and Business Ethics in the College of Business at the University of Illinois Chicago; he was a judge on the Illinois Circuit Court of Cook County, having been sworn in February 27, 2009, and retiring from the bench in July, 2016. Scully was a Democratic member of the Illinois House of Representatives, representing the 80th District for twelve years after defeating Flora Ciarlo in the 1996 general election. The district was located in southern Cook County, including parts of Park Forest, Olympia Fields, Flossmoor, Lansing, Lynwood, Glenwood, Beecher, University Park, and all of Chicago Heights, South Chicago Heights, Steger, Crete, and Sauk Village.

Michael B. Barrett was elected to the vacancy created by Scully's resignation.
