= Chester Stranczek =

American politician

- Pitcher
- Born: November 19, 1929; Cook County, Illinois, US
- Died: September 5, 2015 (aged 85); Crestwood, Illinois, US
- Batted: Right Threw: Right

Career statistics
- Games: 84
- Win–loss record: 16-26
- Earned run average: 4.36
- Stats at Baseball Reference

Teams
- Iola Indians (1951); El Dorado Oilers (1954); Burlington Bees (1954); Baton Rouge Red Sticks (1954–1955); Baton Rouge Rebels (1956)

Chester K. Stranczek (November 19, 1929 – September 5, 2015) was an American businessman, politician, and former Minor League Baseball player who was the mayor of Crestwood, Illinois, for 39 years, from 1969 to 2007. He drew national attention during his tenure for cutting expenses in part by privatizing city services, and for refunding residents' property taxes for more than a decade. He was also known as a colorful character with outspoken views on political and social issues, sometimes using a personal billboard posted near the town entrance to express his political and religious beliefs.

Stranczek was born in Cook County, Illinois, on November 19, 1929. He was the first of eight children born to Polish immigrants Josephine & Kanty Stranczek. Only Polish was spoken at home, and Stranczek began to speak English in first grade. He died in 2015.

== Baseball career ==
Stranczek worked on his family's farm until graduation from high school in 1949, when he joined the Salina Blue Jays as a pitcher in the Kansas Oklahoma Missouri League. In 1951, he was drafted into the Army. During the Korean War, Stranczek spent 17 months on the Army's baseball team, which was headquartered in Tokyo and toured the Far East. He returned to minor league baseball in 1954, playing with the Burlington Bees before joining the Baton Rouge Red Sticks. In 1955, Stranczek tore the ligament in his right knee, which ended his baseball career.

== Business and political career ==
After his injury, Stranczek returned to Illinois, and worked for a trucking company before starting his own business, Crest Fuel & Materials, in May 1959. He married Diane Buksa in 1961 and they had two sons, Michael (born 1961) and Robert (born 1964).

In 1969, Stranczek ran as a Republican for mayor of the village of Crestwood. It was a post he would hold for nearly forty years until his retirement in 2007. He declared his intention to run the town like a business, and through a series of privatizations raised enough business revenue for residential property tax rebates. Those began in 1993 with a total $1 million rebate and increased annually until 2009, when city officials were sued for providing drinking water from a contaminated well. It was found that since the early 1980s the mayor and other officials had opted to tap water from a contaminated source rather than fix a leaky water main.

Stranczek retired mid-term in 2007, at age 78. He was succeeded as mayor by his son, Robert Stranczek.

== Later life and death ==
After stepping down as mayor, Chester Stranczek retired to Boca Raton, Florida. He developed Parkinson's disease and died September 5, 2015, at the age of 85. He is buried at the St. Benedict Catholic Cemetery in Crestwood.

== Water contamination scandal ==
In April 2009, the Chicago Tribune reported that for 40 years the city had been drawing drinking water from a well contaminated with toxic chemicals. By secretly drawing water from their contaminated well, Crestwood officials saved $380,000 a year that otherwise would have been spent maintaining the water system, and avoided routine testing that would have alerted authorities to toxic chemicals in the village's drinking water.

In April 2013, Crestwood police chief Theresa Neubauer, who was also the city's water commissioner, and certified water operator Frank Scaccia were both found guilty of lying to environmental regulators about water quality. They were sentenced to two years' probation each. Chester Stranczek had by then been diagnosed with Parkinson's disease, and was found not competent to face charges or testify in the case.
