= 2008 Cook County State's Attorney election =

- November 4, 2008
- Turnout: 73.71% (ballots cast) (Note: share of registered voters casting a ballot in Cook County); 67.23% (votes cast) (Note: share of registered voters casting a vote for State's Attorney; this statistic excludes ballots which undervoted by leaving a "blank vote" for State's Attorney)
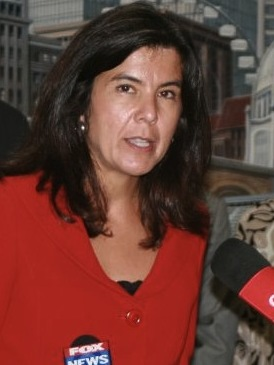

| Candidate | Anita Alvarez | Tony Peraica | Thomas O'Brien |
| Party | Democratic | Republican | Green |
| Popular vote | 1,378,452 | 494,611 | 99,101 |
| Percentage | 69.90% | 25.08% | 5.03% |
State's Attorney before election
Richard A. Devine
Democratic
Elected State's Attorney
Anita Alvarez
Democratic

In the 2008 Cook County State's Attorney election, held on November 4, 2008, Democratic nominee Anita Alvarez defeated Republican nominee Tony Peraica and Green nominee Thomas O'Brien. Alvarez became the first Hispanic/Latina woman elected to the office.

The general election was preceded by primary elections held on February 5. After third-term Democratic incumbent Richard A. Devine opted to forgo seeking an additional term, Alvarez (a prosecutor in the State's Attorney's Office) narrowly won a crowded six-candidate Democratic primary with 25.73% of the vote. She won 9,562 (1.01%) more votes than runner-up Thomas R. Allen (a member of the Chicago City Council), who won 24.72% of the vote. In the primary, Larry Suffredin (a member of the Cook County Board of Commissioners) received 22.14% of the vote, Howard Brookins (a member of the Chicago City Council) received 18.18% of the vote, Robert J. Milan (an Assistant State's Attorney) received 5.82% of the vote, and Tommy H. Brewer received 3.41% of the vote. In the crowded contest, Alvarez benefited from the an endorsement by Chicago's police union, the Fraternal Order of Police Lodge #7. In contrast to the crowded Democrati primary, the Republican primary saw Peraica run unopposed, and the Green Party nominated O'Brien without a primary contest.

== Democratic primary ==
Incumbent third-term State's Attorney Richard A. Devine, a Democrat, did not seek reelection. The Democratic primary was won by Anita Alvarez, who was at the time the third-highest ranked prosecutor in the State's Attorneys office. She was the first Hispanic/Latina woman to have ever won the party's nomination for Cook County State's Attorney.

The Democratic primary had six candidates, among whom the leading contenders were Alvarez (Assistant State's Attorney), Thomas R. Allen (a member of the Chicago City Council), Larry Suffredin (a member of the Cook County Board of Commissioners), and Howard Brookins (a member of the Chicago City Council).

=== Candidates in the Democratic primary ===
Ran

- Thomas R. Allen, Chicago City Council alderman from the 38th ward since 1993 and former Cook County public defender
- Anita Alvarez, Assistant State's Attorney
- Tommy H. Brewer
- Howard Brookins, Chicago City Council alderman from the 21st ward since 2003
- Robert J. Milan, Assistant State's Attorney
- Larry Suffredin, member the Cook County Board of Commissioners from the 13th district since 2002

Declined

- Richard A. Devine, incumbent State's Attorney since 1996

=== Campaigning in the Democratic primary ===
No front-runner emerged from the crowded field, resulting in a tense campaign in which each of the candidates critiqued the rest of the field.

The rest of the candidates criticized both Alvarez and Milan, who had worked as deputies under incumbent State's Attorney Divine, for wrongful convictions by the State's Attorney office and for the office's failure to bring criminal charges against Jon Burge (a Chicago Police Department commander who tortured criminal suspects into making confessions. Allen characterized Alvarez's candidacy as promising to continue the status quo of the department that had generated these and other scandals. Alvarez refuted the implication that she was connected to the scandals and status quo of the office, claiming, "despite being a 21-year prosecutor, I am not the status quo."

Alvarez characterized her top opponents (Allen, Brookins, Sufferdin) as political insiders who were likely to be tempted to use the office of State's Attorney to punish political rivals and shield corrupt political allies. All three were far more integrated into local politics than Alvarez, holding elected offices. Alvarez characterized their candidacies as posing the, "true danger in handing [the office of State's Attorney] over to someone who will make charging decisions for political reasons".

Sufferdin sought to position himself as a candidate aligned with reform efforts, and received the endorsement of several prominent local liberals (including Congressman Jesse Jackson Jr. and fellow County Board member Forrest Claypool). However, his opponents claimed that his alignment with reform was a hallow facade, noting that Sufferdin had previously worked as a lobbyist for the tobacco industry and casino industry.

Alvarez benefited from the an endorsement by Chicago's police union, the Fraternal Order of Police Lodge #7. The Fraternal Order of Police criticized Sufferdin, seizing on his representation in the 1970s of a client that had been seeking early release from prison after being convicted of murdering a police officer.

Brookins, himself African-American, centered his candidacy on the view that Cook County's criminal justice system had mistreated Black people. His candidacy received the endorsement of noted civil rights activist Jesse Jackson Sr.

During the primary, a large portion of Alvarez's campaigns funds were from $640,000 in loans given to her committee by her husband (a gynecologist and obstetrician).

Alvarez expressed her belief that the differentiator of her gender and hispanic ethnicity played a role in benefiting her campaign for the nomination, but also believed that her professional experience as a prosecutor was a major factor in her success.

=== Results of the Democratic primary ===
The primary utilized a first-past-the-post (single-round plurality) method. Alvarez narrowly won, with 25.73% of the vote –a percentage-point greater than the runner-up

Cook County State’s Attorney Democratic primary
| Party | Candidate | Votes | % |
|---|---|---|---|
| Democratic | Anita Alvarez | 244,538 | 25.73 |
| Democratic | Tom Allen | 234,976 | 24.72 |
| Democratic | Larry Suffredin | 210,381 | 22.14 |
| Democratic | Howard B. Brookins, Jr. | 172,746 | 18.18 |
| Democratic | Robert J. Milan | 55,350 | 5.82 |
| Democratic | Tommy H. Brewer | 32,430 | 3.41 |
| Total votes | | 950,421 | 100 |

== Republican primary ==
Tony Peraica, a Republican member of the Cook County Board of Commissioners, ran unopposed in the Republican primary.

Cook County State’s Attorney Republican primary
| Party | Candidate | Votes | % |
|---|---|---|---|
| Republican | Tony Peraica | 137,767 | 100 |
| Total votes | | 137,767 | 100 |

== Green nomination ==
While the Green Party of Illinois (a third party) had a publicly-run primary coinciding with those of the major party, there were no ballot-certified or formal write-in candidates in its primary seeking the office of State's Attorney. The Green Party ultimately nominated Thomas O'Brien.

== General election ==
Alvarez won the general election, becoming the first Hispanic/Latina woman elected to the office.

Cook County State’s Attorney election
| Party | Candidate | Votes | % | ±% |
|---|---|---|---|---|
| Democratic | Anita Alvarez | 1,378,452 | 69.90 | −9.63 |
| Republican | Tony Peraica | 494,611 | 25.08 | +4.51 |
| Green | Thomas O'Brien | 99,101 | 5.03 | N/A |
| Total votes | | 1,972,164 | 100 | |

== See also ==
- 2008 Cook County, Illinois, elections
- 2008 Illinois elections
