= Debbie Halvorson =

American politician (born 1958)

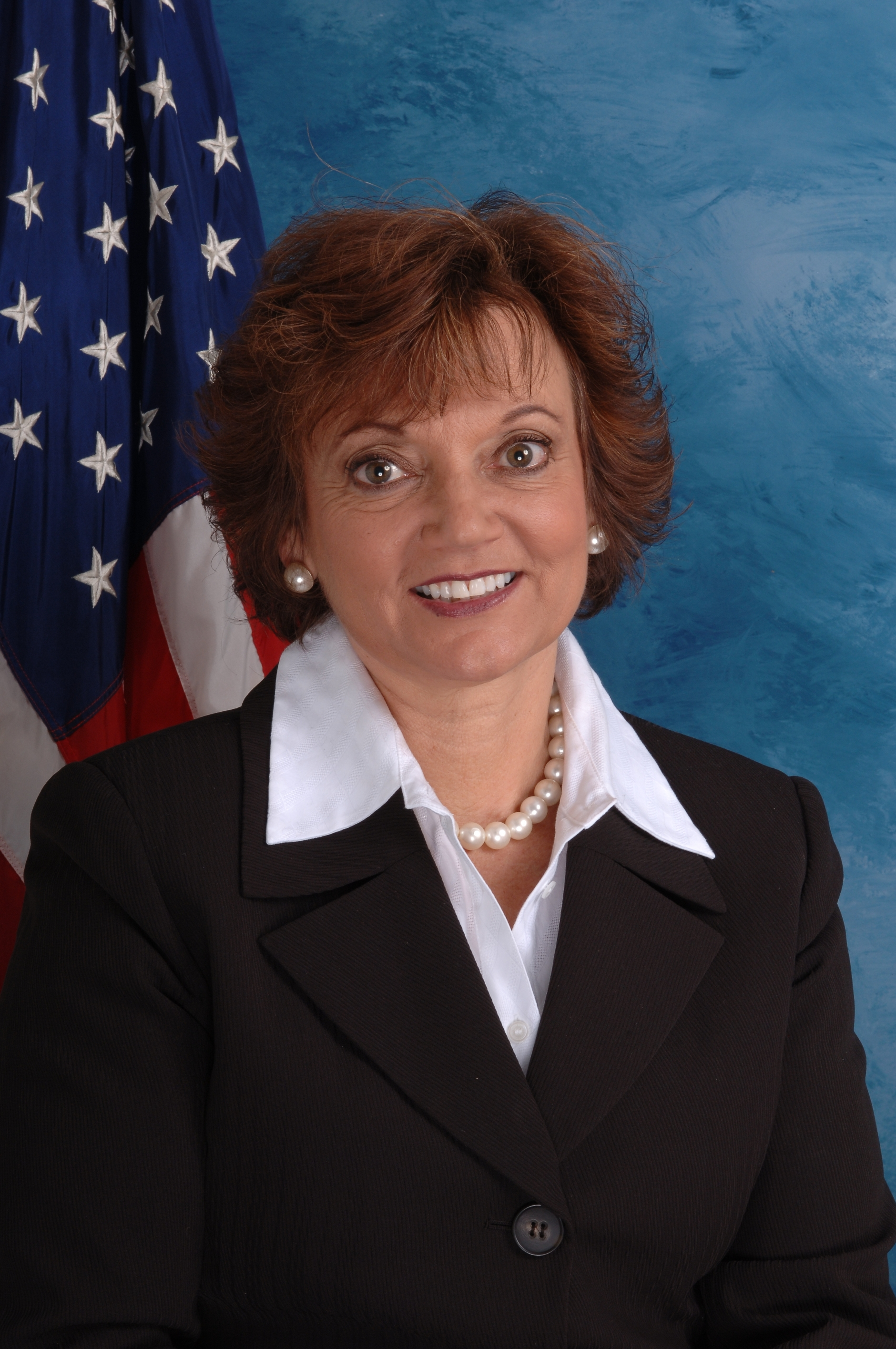

Member of the U.S. House of Representatives from Illinois's 11th district
- In office January 3, 2009 – January 3, 2011
- Preceded by: Jerry Weller
- Succeeded by: Adam Kinzinger

Member of the Illinois Senate from the 40th district
- In office January 8, 1997 – January 3, 2009
- Preceded by: Aldo DeAngelis
- Succeeded by: Toi Hutchinson

Personal details
- Born: March 1, 1958 (age 68) Chicago Heights, Illinois, U.S.
- Party: Democratic
- Spouse: Jim Bush
- Education: Robert Morris College; Prairie State College (AA); Governors State University (BA, MA)

Deborah L. Halvorson (born March 1, 1958) is an American politician who served as the U.S. representative for Illinois's 11th congressional district from 2009 until 2011. Previously, she served in the Illinois Senate from 1997 through 2009. She is a member of the Democratic Party.

After losing her congressional seat in the 2010 election, she ran in the newly redistricted 2nd congressional district in the 2012 election, but was defeated in the Democratic primary by incumbent Jesse Jackson Jr. She made another attempt to win the seat in the 2013 special election, but lost the primary to Robin Kelly.

== Early life, education, and early career ==
Halvorson grew up in Steger, Illinois and graduated from Bloom High School. She and her husband Jim Bush live in Crete and have four children and four grandchildren. She worked 13 years as a cosmetics saleswoman for Mary Kay before entering public service. She has degrees from Robert Morris College, Prairie State College and Governors State University (Bachelor of Arts and Master's in Communication). She became a sales representative, Crete Township Clerk, and an educator at the Governors State University.

== Illinois Senate (1997–2009) ==
=== Elections ===
Halvorson first ran for the Illinois State Senate in November 1996, defeating incumbent Republican State Senator Aldo DeAngelis 56%–44% in Illinois' 40th Senate District. In 1998, she won re-election to a second term defeating State Representative Flora Ciarlo 66%–34%. In 2002, she won re-election to a third term unopposed. In 2006, she won re-election to a fourth term with 70% of the vote.

=== Tenure ===
In 2005, Halvorson became the first female Majority Leader of the Illinois State Senate.

After being diagnosed as a high risk for cervical cancer due to HPV, Halvorson gained special notoriety and controversy by creating a program intended to broaden access to HPV testing and vaccination.

Halvorson had a public dispute with Jesse Jackson, Jr., over the proposed Peotone airport, which led Jackson to attempt to tie Halvorson to Tony Rezko. The airport has never been in Jackson's district.

Following Halvorson's election to the House, there was an ongoing process, narrowed to three possible candidates, for Halvorson's successor in the Illinois Senate; she was eventually replaced by Toi Hutchinson. Just before Halvorson was set to officially resign from her seat, Governor Rod Blagojevich was arrested. Halvorson said, "As frustrated and disappointed as I was, I was not surprised." She also called for Blagojevich to resign.

=== Committee assignments ===
- Senate Committee of the Whole
- Senate Committee on Agriculture & Conservation
- Senate Committee on Transportation
  - Senate Subcommittee on Airports (Chairperson)
  - Senate Subcommittee on Tollways (Chairperson)
  - Subcommittee on Railroad Safety
- Senate Taskforce on Alcoholic Beverages

== U.S. House of Representatives (2009–2011) ==
=== Elections ===
2008

In September 2007, incumbent Republican U.S. Congressman Jerry Weller announced that he would not seek another term, citing the need to spend more time with his family. On October 2, 2007, Halvorson announced her decision to run for the seat. EMILY's List endorsed Halvorson in November. In February 2008, Republican nominee, New Lenox Mayor Tim Baldermann, withdrew from the race, citing other obligations. He was replaced by businessman Marty Ozinga. Halvorson easily won the general election with 58% of the vote, while Ozinga only got 34%. In 2020, Ozinga's son, Tim Ozinga, was elected to the Illinois House of Representatives.

2010

Halvorson lost to Republican nominee Adam Kinzinger 58%–42%. Despite her landslide victory two years earlier, this was the fifth-largest margin of defeat for a Democratic house incumbent in 2010.

2012

In September 2011, Halvorson filed a candidacy with the FEC to run in the newly redistricted Illinois's 2nd congressional district, against incumbent Democrat Jesse Jackson, Jr. “He (Jackson) lives in D.C. He doesn’t come home on weekends. His kids go to school in D.C." She also said that “They should be fearing me becoming a congresswoman. I represent the people who live in the (current) 11th district. He’s just nervous that I’m going to become a congresswoman because then his control is over.” The newly drawn district is just 54% African American. Jackson defeated her 71%–29%.

2013

On November 21, 2012, Jesse Jackson Jr. resigned from office. Halvorson announced her candidacy on November 26 but lost the primary election to Robin Kelly on February 26, 2013.

=== Tenure ===
Halvorson was appointed to the powerful Steering and Policy Committee as well as a member of Veterans, Small Business and Agriculture. One of her true loves is Economic Development and Transportation. During her time in office she said that one of her main focuses were constituent services. She has agreed with the 2009 Economic Stimulus Act, Cap and Trade of Emissions, and the Federal Health Care Bill.

=== Committee assignments ===
- Committee on Agriculture
  - Subcommittee on Conservation, Credit, Energy, and Research
  - Subcommittee on General Farm Commodities and Risk Management
- Committee on Small Business
  - Subcommittee on Finance and Tax
  - Subcommittee on Contracting and Technology
- Committee on Veterans' Affairs
  - Subcommittee on Disability Assistance and Memorial Affairs

== Electoral history ==
Illinois's 11th congressional district: Results
2008	Debbie Halvorson	185,652	58.4%	Marty Ozinga	109,608	34.5%	Jason Wallace	22,635	7.1%
2010	Debbie Halvorson	94,939	42.5%	Adam Kinzinger	128,250	57.5%			

== See also ==
- Women in the United States House of Representatives

U.S. House of Representatives
Preceded by Jerry Weller	Member of the U.S. House of Representatives from Illinois's 11th congressional district 2009–2011	Succeeded by Adam Kinzinger
U.S. order of precedence (ceremonial)
Preceded by Michael Patrick Flanagan as Former U.S. Representative	Order of precedence of the United States as Former U.S. Representative	Succeeded by Joe Walsh as Former U.S. Representative
