= Jeff Tobolski =

American politician (1964–2025)

Member of the Cook County Board of Commissioners from the 16th district
- In office December 2010 – March 31, 2020
- Preceded by: Tony Peraica
- Succeeded by: Frank Aguilar

Mayor of McCook, Illinois
- In office 2007 – 2020 (acting 2007–2009)
- Succeeded by: Terry Carr (acting)

Personal details
- Born: September 14, 1964 McCook, Illinois, U.S.
- Died: November 9, 2025 (aged 61)
- Party: Democratic
- Spouse: Cathleen Patterson
- Children: 1
- Education: Knox College (BA)

Jeff Tobolski (September 14, 1964 – November 9, 2025) was an American politician who was a member of the Cook County Board of Commissioners, representing the 16th district of the City of Chicago. and also served as mayor of McCook, Illinois from 2007 to 2020.

== Early life ==
Tobolski was born and raised in McCook, Illinois, where he lived with his wife and daughter. He graduated from both St. Hugh School in Lyons, Illinois and St. Joseph High School in Westchester. He played basketball for head coach Gene Pingatore during his time at St. Joseph. He later earned a Bachelor of Arts in history at Knox College. Jeff served as a Trustee for the McCook Park District and then as president. He then served as a Village of McCook Trustee for six years, and was appointed interim Mayor of McCook in 2007. In 2009, he was elected Mayor of McCook to a full four-year term. Prior to becoming Mayor, he worked as a claim's adjuster for Fireman's Fund Insurance Company for fifteen years as a claim's adjuster, including five years investigating insurance fraud in the Special Investigations Unit and as a Field Claims Adjuster for Standard Mutual Insurance Company.

== Cook County Commissioner ==
In the Democratic primary, he was endorsed by the Chicago Sun Times and the Chicago Tribune over Bill Russ, the Village President of Brookfield and Northlake Alderman Eddy Garcia. He won the Democratic nomination with 55% of the vote to his opponents 23% and 22% respectively.

During the election, he was endorsed by Chicago Federation of Labor, Service Employees International Union, Local 73, Chicago Firefighters Union, Local 2, LIUNA, Local 225, the Italian American Political Coalition and the Hispanic Illinois State Law Enforcement Association (HISLEA). Additionally, he received endorsements from numerous other officials in the district including U.S. Representative Dan Lipinski State Senators Don Harmon, Tony Munoz, and Martin Sandoval, State Representatives Elizabeth Hernandez, Karen Yarbrough, and Michael Zalewski, President of the Metropolitan Water Reclamation District Terrence J. O'Brien and twelve local mayors. On Election Day, he defeated incumbent Tony Peraica with 50% of the vote to Peraica's 43%.

As a member of the Cook County Board of Commissioners he served as the Chair Homeland Security & Emergency Management Committee and Vice Chair of the Veterans Committee. His other committee assignments were Capital Improvements, Finance - Litigation, Finance - Pension, Finance - Tax Delinquency, Finance - Workers' Compensation, Law Enforcement and Workforce, Job Development & Training Development. Like all commissioners, he was a member of the board for the Forest Preserve District of Cook County which is responsible for the management of 68,000 acres of forest preserves and is the chairman of that board's Zoological Committee.

On March 6, 2020, Tobolski turned in his resignation from his Cook County Commissioner role, effective at the end of the month, amid a federal probe. Local Democratic Committeepersons appointed Frank Aguilar, a former Republican member of the Illinois House of Representatives from Cicero to succeed Tobolski.

== Convictions ==
In 2020, Tobolski pled guilty to extortion conspiracy, related to the extortion of a local restaurant owner and filing a false tax return, but also agreed to cooperate with the government and would not be sentenced.

In August 2025, Tobolski was convicted of bribery and extortion and sentenced to four years in prison, with his jail time at this point in time set to begin in January 2026, due to his health issues. However, he would die before he could serve this prison sentence.

== Death ==
Tobloski died following a short illness on November 9, 2025, at the age of 61.
