= Tony Peraica =

American politician (born 1957)

Member of the Cook County Board of Commissioners from the 16th district
- In office 2002–2010
- Preceded by: Allan C. Carr
- Succeeded by: Jeff Tobolski

Personal details
- Born: April 14, 1957 (age 69) Croatia
- Party: Republican
- Other political affiliations: Democratic
- Occupation: Attorney

Anthony J. "Tony" Peraica (born April 14, 1957) is an American politician from Chicago, Illinois. He was the Cook County Commissioner for the 16th district, and was the unsuccessful Republican nominee for Cook County treasurer in 1998, for president of the Cook County Board of Commissioners in 2006, for Cook County state's attorney in 2008, and for Cook County clerk in 2022.

== Early life, education, and career ==
Peraica was born in Croatia in 1957, and was orphaned at the age of 11. He came to the United States when he was 13. He lived in Bridgeport, Chicago with his aunt and uncle. He attended the University of Illinois at Chicago, where he earned his B.A. in political science. He went on to earn his J.D. from the John Marshall Law School. He was admitted to the Illinois Bar in 1984, and continues to work as a lawyer in private practice at Anthony J. Peraica & Associates.

== Political career ==
In 1994, Peraica was the Democratic nominee for the 16th district election to the Cook County Board of Commissioners, losing to Republican Allan C. Carr.

In 1998, Peraica switched parties and was the Republican nominee for Cook County Treasurer, this time losing an open race to Democrat Maria Pappas.

He was elected to the Cook County Board of Commissioners in 2002 as a Republican, after defeating Al Carr in the Republican primary.

Peraica served as the Lyons Township Republican committeeman from 2002 to December 31, 2012.

In 2006, Peraica secured the Republican nomination for board president. Democrat Forrest Claypool challenged incumbent John Stroger in the Democratic primary. Stroger fell ill in the days leading up the primary, but defeated Claypool narrowly. Stroger withdrew from the general election, and the Democratic Party selected his son, Todd Stroger, to take his place on the ballot. Peraica ran a strong campaign in the heavily Democratic county, but ultimately lost in a close race to the younger Stroger. Peraica did, however, secure reelection to the county board.

In November 2008, Peraica lost the race for Cook County State's Attorney to Anita Alvarez, who was backed by the Chicago Democratic Party. In his 2010 Republican primary election for County Board, Peraica defeated his opponent 75% to 25%. During the 2010 election for the Cook County 16th District Commissioner, he was arrested for tearing up signs of his Democratic opponent Jeffery Tobolski in McCook.

On November 2, 2010, Peraica lost his bid for re-election to the County Board, being unseated by Democrat Jeffery Tobolski. Peraica received 42.3% of the vote to Tobolski's 50.6%.

On December 4, 2012, Peraica was found guilty of criminal damage to property for defacing the former rival's campaign signs prior to the 2010 election, and he was sentenced to four months of court supervision.

During the 2016 Republican Party presidential primaries, Peraica served on the Illinois leadership team of the presidential campaign of Senator Ted Cruz.

Peraica was the Republican nominee in the 2022 Cook County Clerk election.

== Personal life ==
Peraica and wife Nilofar live in Riverside.
