= Michelle Chavez =

American politician

Michelle Chavez was the Illinois State Representative for the 24th district which includes all of Cicero, Illinois and part of Berwyn, Illinois from 2005 to 2007.

Chavez, a Democrat, was elected in 2004, defeating incumbent Republican Frank Aguilar in what was thought to be a non-competitive race. She had run in the primary, allegedly at the behest of Aguilar, and won the Democratic nomination, after which she did very little campaigning, for the general election.

Chavez was defeated in her bid for re-election on March 21, 2006 in the Democratic primary by Elizabeth "Lisa" Hernandez in a three way race. Chavez had previously defeated Hernandez for the Democratic nomination in 2004.

== Electoral history ==
- 2004 Democratic Primary
  - Michelle Chavez 45.71%
  - Elizabeth "Lisa" Hernandez 33.37%
  - Isamael Vargas 20.92%
- 2004 General Election
  - Michelle Chavez (D) 53.24%
  - Frank Aguilar (R) 46.76%
- 2006 Democratic primary
  - Elizabeth "Lisa" Hernandez 56.74%
  - Michelle Chavez 27.52%
  - Roberto Garcia 15.74%

Committee assignments: Human Services; Approp-Elementary & Secondary Educ; Mass Transit; State Government Administration; Health Care Availability Access; Higher Education; Govt. Accountability and Streamlini; Committee of the Whole.

== Sources ==
- Profile

Preceded by Frank Aguilar	24th District Illinois State Representative; 2005-2006	Succeeded by Elizabeth "Lisa" Hernandez
