= Steger School District 194 =

School district in Illinois, United States

Address
- 3753 Park Avenue Steger, Illinois, 60475; United States

District information
- Type: Public
- Grades: PreK–8
- NCES District ID: 1737680

Students and staff
- Students: 1,403

Other information
- Website: www.sd194.org

Steger School District 194 is a school district based in the village of Steger, Illinois, a Chicago suburb located in the extreme southern reaches of Cook County, and the northern portion of Will County. The district is composed of one middle school and three elementary schools; all schools are located in Steger with the exception of one. District students in grades that range between kindergarten and fourth grade attend one of the three elementary schools. Two elementary schools, named Eastview Elementary School and Parkview Elementary School, are located in the village of Steger; they are directed by, respectively, principals Janet Inglese and Stephanie Winborn. A third elementary school, Saukview Elementary School, is located in the nearby village South Chicago Heights and is headed by principal Jeff Nelson. All three elementary schools feed their graduates into Columbia Central School, where the students will remain between grades six and eight under jurisdiction of principal Mike Smith. The district superintendent is Jeff Stawick.
