= McCook station (Illinois) =

McCook

General information
- Location: McCook, Illinois
- Coordinates: 41°47′22″N 87°50′04″W
- System: Former ATSF passenger rail station
- Owner: none (destroyed)
- Platforms: 1
- Tracks: 2

Construction
- Structure type: at-grade

History
- Closed: 1971

Former services
Preceding station	Atchison, Topeka and Santa Fe Railway	Following station
Willow Springs toward Los Angeles	Main Line	Nerska toward Chicago
Location

McCook station was an Atchison, Topeka and Santa Fe Railway station in McCook, Illinois. The station was next to the McCook Junction, where BNSF and Indiana Harbor Belt/CSXT tracks interchange. The station closed in 1971 when Amtrak took over United States passenger rail, although freight service still runs on the double-tracked line.

This station was in operation until 1982 when it was closed along with GM Yard in Willow Springs, and the employees of both stations were laid off unless they could bump elsewhere.
