= Anthony DeLuca (Illinois politician) =

American politician

Anthony J. DeLuca

Member of the Illinois House of Representatives from the 80th district
- Incumbent
- Assumed office March 2009
- Preceded by: George Scully, Jr.

Mayor of Chicago Heights
- In office May 2003 – May 2009
- Preceded by: Angelo "Sam" Ciambrone
- Succeeded by: Alex Lopez

Personal details
- Born: July 25, 1970 (age 56) Chicago Heights, Illinois, U.S.
- Party: Democratic
- Education: Elmhurst College
- Profession: Businessman

Anthony J. DeLuca (born July 25, 1970) is a member of the Illinois House of Representatives who has represented the 80th district since his appointment in March 2009 to succeed George Scully, who was appointed to the Illinois Circuit Court of Cook County. The Southland based district includes all or parts of Homewood, Flossmoor, Chicago Heights, Park Forest, South Chicago Heights, University Park, Frankfort, Manhattan and Olympia Fields, Manhattan, Frankfort, Mokena, New Lenox, Glenwood, Symerton, Illinois.

Before being appointed to that position, he served as mayor of Chicago Heights, Illinois, since 2003. Some controversy was created as DeLuca is known to many to be a member of the Republican Party, whereas Scully is a Democrat. DeLuca has stated, "If I am appointed to a Democratic seat, I am a Democrat."

As of July 3, 2022, Representative DeLuca is a member of the following Illinois House committees:

- (Chairman of) Cities & Villages Committee (HCIV)
- Cybersecurity, Data Analytics, & IT Committee (HCDA)
- Insurance Committee (HINS)
- (Co-chairman of) Insurance Review Subcommittee (HINS-INSU)
- (Chairman of) Local Government Subcommittee (HCIV-LOCA)
- Prescription Drug Affordability Committee (HPDA)
