= Howard Brookins =

American politician

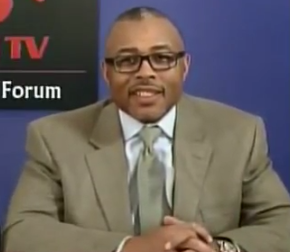

Member of the Chicago City Council from the 21st ward
- In office May 2003 – May 15, 2023
- Preceded by: Leonard DeVille
- Succeeded by: Ronnie Mosley

Personal details
- Born: Howard Beamon Brookins Jr. October 21, 1963 (age 63)
- Party: Democratic
- Education: Southern Illinois University, Carbondale (BA); Northern Illinois University (JD)

Howard Beamon Brookins Jr. (born October 21, 1963) is an American politician who served as the Alderman of the 21st Ward of the City of Chicago. Originally elected in 2003, Brookins declined to seek reelection in 2023 and was succeeded by Ronnie Mosley.

== Early life ==
Brookins, the son of legislator Howard B. Brookins Sr., attended Mendel Catholic High School, Southern Illinois University, and received his JD from Northern Illinois University.

== Public service ==
Brookins is a former Assistant Defender, Assistant States Attorney, and Special Assistant Attorney General. Brookins serves on the Board of Directors for Community Media Workshop and he is active with the 9100 South Union Block Club. Brookins is currently a partner in Brookins and Wilson Law Firm.

In 2008, Brookins unsuccessfully ran for the Democratic nomination in the Cook County State's Attorney election.

On March 14, 2016, Brookins lost a Democratic congressional primary to Bobby Rush.

== Aldermanic career ==
Brookins was elected as alderman in 2003 after he defeated incumbent Leonard DeVille. He has been reelected in 2007, 2011, 2015, and 2019. He serves on sixteen committees, and chairs two:

Committee on Aviation	Member
Committee on Budget and Government Operations	Member
Committee on Committees, Rules and Ethics	Member
Committee on Economic, Capital and Technology Development	Member
Committee on Education and Child Development	Chairman
Committee on Finance	Member
Committee on Pedestrian and Traffic Safety	Member
Committee on Workforce Development and Audit	Member
Committee on Zoning, Landmarks and Building Standards	Member
Joint Committee: Budget and Government Operations; Public Safety	Member
Joint Committee: Economic, Capital and Technology Development; Finance	Member
Joint Committee: Education and Child Development; Health and Environmental Protection	Chairman
Joint Committee: Finance; Budget and Government Operations	Member
Joint Committee: Finance; License and Consumer Protection	Member
Joint Committee: Finance; Public Safety	Member
Joint Committee: Housing and Real Estate; Zoning, Landmarks and Building Standards	Member
Joint Committee: Workforce Development and Audit; Committees, Rules and Ethics	Member
Joint Committee; Finance; Public Safety (inactive)	Member

Although he was not able to achieve a majority of votes in the February 27, 2007 general election, he was re-elected in the April 17 runoff election against his challenger Leroy Jones.

Brookins made $114,913 as a part-time alderman in 2011, making him one of the 19 highest paid alderman. While others chose not to accept annual pay raises while city employees were laid off, Brookins did stating, "Once it's out there, I think for me to give it back to the city for someone else to waste it somewhere else in the city doesn't make sense, and it doesn't help me with my obligations to my family." An additional source of revenue for Alderman Brookins is his law firm.

On February 28, 2014, Brookins' chief of staff, Curtis V. Thompson Jr. was charged with accepting a $7,500 bribe as part of an undercover corruption probe, and sentenced to 15 months in prison by U.S. district Judge Samuel Der-Yeghiayan. The Chicago Sun reports that "Thompson helped a federal informant land Brookins' essential support for a liquor license in the 21st Ward in 2013. In exchange, the informant handed Thompson 75 $100 bills stuffed into a Christmas card during a party at Brookins' office, court records show."

On November 13, 2016, Brookins was biking along Cal-Sag Trail when a squirrel jumped into the spokes, and crashed the bike. This left Brookins with a fractured skull, broke his nose, and knocked out a few teeth. The attack came after Brookins had given a series of speeches denouncing squirrels in Chicago saying "It's a pet peeve. It does invoke some giggles. But we are spending too much money on replacing garbage carts because the squirrels continue to eat through 'em," and "I get calls [with residents saying], 'I need a new garbage can.' I just gave you a garbage can. [And the caller says], 'Well, the squirrels ate through it in two days and nobody wants trash throughout the community. So they keep asking us for garbage cans." A survey found that 11% of the cities garbage carts are damaged, costing $300,000 in repairs. At least some of that damage does come from squirrels.

On December 1, 2017, Brookins announced that he was circulating petitions to challenge U.S. Congressman Bobby L. Rush of Chicago's Second Congressional District, but Brookins later withdrew his petitions when Rush ultimately filed to keep his seat, on December 4, 2017. But three days later, on December 7, 2017, Brookins announced his intent to "leave public service" by circulating petitions to fill a vacancy on the Circuit Court of Cook County when the Illinois Courts Commission forced former-judge Valarie Turner into retirement. On January 30, 2018, the Cook County Electoral Board removed Brookins from the ballot for that judicial vacancy after it was determined that Brookins was between 250 and 398 short of the required signatures to get on the ballot.

In the runoff of the 2019 Chicago mayoral election, Brookins endorsed Toni Preckwinkle.

== Personal life ==
Brookins is married to Ebony Taylor-Brookins and has two children: Howard Beamon Brookins III and Harihson B. Brookins.
