= Aldo DeAngelis =

American politician and businessman

- official portrait photograph, circa 1980s

Member of the Illinois Senate from the 40th district
- In office January 1979 – January 1997
- Preceded by: Robert Lane
- Succeeded by: Debbie Halvorson

Personal details
- Born: March 25, 1931 Chicago Heights, Illinois, U.S.
- Died: February 13, 2004 (aged 72) Olympia Fields, Illinois, U.S.
- Party: Republican
- Spouse: Meredith Roberts
- Children: 4
- Education: Knox College

Aldo A. DeAngelis (March 13, 1931 – February 13, 2004) was an American politician and businessman who served as a member of the Illinois State Senate.

== Early life, education, and career ==
DeAngelis was born on March 25, 1931, in Chicago Heights, Illinois. He graduated from Bloom High School. He served as a public information officer in the United States Army from 1954 to 1956. DeAngelis graduated from Knox College in Galesburg, Illinois. He also went to University of Chicago and Governors State University. He moved to Texas and started a steel and tube company. He then moved back to Chicago Heights, Illinois, and started the Vulcan Tube and Metals Company.

== Illinois Senate ==
DeAngelis was elected to the Illinois Senate in the 1978 general election as a Republican. In the Republican primary, DeAngelis defeated State Representative Thomas Miller, the preferred candidate of Governor James R. Thompson. In the general election, DeAngelis defeated Democratic incumbent Robert Lane. DeAngelis served in the Illinois State Senate from 1979 to 1997. DeAngelis then sold his business. During the 1990s, DeAngelis served as a member of the Illinois Republican Party Central Committee from Illinois's 4th congressional district.

For a portion of his tenure in the Illinois Senate, DeAngelis was the chamber's assistant minority leader. DeAngelis served on various committees, including those on the Executive; Executive Appointments, Veterans' Affair and Administrations; Revenue. He served as co-chairman of Legislative Audit Commission.

In 1990, DeAngelis was the Republican nominee for President of the Cook County Board of Commissioners. While he lost that election, he was elected a member of the Cook County Board of Commissioners in the coinciding election for the board's members. DeAngelis opted against taking the office. After a quick turnaround between swearing in and resignation, former mayor of Homewood Robert T. Gooley was sworn in to the seat that DeAngelis had won on the county board.

In the 1996 general election for Illinois Senate, Democratic candidate Debbie Halvorson, the Crete Township Clerk, defeated DeAngelis.

== Later life and death ==
After he left the Illinois Senate, DeAngelis worked as a lobbyist and consultant.. On February 13, 2004, DeAngelis died of a heart attack at his home in Olympia Fields, Illinois.

== Personal life ==
DeAngelis and his wife, Meredith Roberts, had four children.

== Notes ==
Illinois Senate
Preceded by Robert Lane	Member of the Illinois Senate from the 10th district 1979–1983	Succeeded by John A. D'Arco Jr.
Preceded by James Philip	Member of the Illinois Senate from the 40th district 1983–1997	Succeeded by Debbie Halvorson
