= Joan Patricia Murphy =

American politician

Member of the Cook County Board of Commissioners from the 6th district
- In office December 2002 – September 18, 2016
- Preceded by: William Moran
- Succeeded by: Edward Moody

Personal details
- Born: Joan Patricia O'Malley; 1936/1937 South Boston, Massachusetts, U.S.
- Died: September 18, 2016 (aged 79) Crestwood, Illinois, U.S.
- Party: Democratic
- Spouse: Donald Francis Murphy (m. 1973–2016)
- Children: 4
- Education: University of Massachusetts

Joan Patricia Murphy (née O'Malley; 1936/1937 – September 18, 2016) was an American Democratic politician and member of the Cook County Board of Commissioners, representing the 6th district which is located in the Chicago Southland.

== Biography ==
Murphy was born Joan Patricia O'Malley in South Boston, Massachusetts, one of four siblings born to Concetta (née Fama) and Michael O'Malley. She graduated from State Teachers College (now University of Massachusetts, Boston).

From 1965 to 1969 she was the elected clerk of the Village of Crestwood, and later the elected clerk for Worth Township. She went on to be the elected Supervisor for Worth Township. In 1986, Murphy ran in the election to be a member of the Cook County Board of Commissioners from suburban Cook County. While successful in winning the primary to be one of the Democratic Party's nominees, she failed to win election in the general election.

In 1994, when the Cook County Board of Commissioners switched to single-member districts, she ran unsuccessfully to represent its 6th district, losing to Republican Bud Fleming.

In 2002 she won election to represent the 6th district of the Cook County Board of Commissioners. She was reelected in 2006, 2010, and 2014.

Murphy was Chairperson of the Labor Committee and of the Finance-Labor Committee. She was Vice-Chairperson of the Finance-Real Estate Committee and the Zoning and Building Committee. Additionally, Murphy served on 13 committees: Administration, Business and Economic Development, Education, Litigation, Tax Delinquency, Stroger and Cermak Hospitals, Oak Forest Hospital, Provident Hospital, Legislation and Intergovernmental Relations, Health and Hospitals, Finance, Zoning and Buildings, and Roads and Bridges. Murphy led a fight against supervisors taking mandated, unpaid furlough leave.

== Death ==
Murphy died on September 18, 2016, from breast cancer. She was 79 years old.
