= Elizabeth Hernandez (politician) =

American politician (born 1961)

Lisa Hernandez

Chair of the Illinois Democratic Party
- Incumbent
- Assumed office July 30, 2022
- Preceded by: Robin Kelly

Member of the Illinois House of Representatives
- Incumbent
- Assumed office January 10, 2007
- Preceded by: Michelle Chavez
- Constituency: 24th district (2007–2023); 2nd district (2023–present)

Personal details
- Born: July 14, 1961 (age 65) Fort Leonard Wood, Missouri, U.S.
- Party: Democratic
- Spouse: Charles Hernandez
- Education: Morton College (AA); Northeastern Illinois University (BA)

Elizabeth "Lisa" Hernandez (born July 14, 1961) is a member of the Illinois House of Representatives for the 2nd district. The 2nd district, located in the Chicago area, includes parts of Berwyn, Brookfield, Cicero, Riverside, and Stickney and includes parts of the Chicago neighborhood of South Lawndale. Hernandez was born in Fort Leonard Wood, Missouri in 1961 and lives in Cicero with her husband Charles and their three children.

== Electoral career ==
Hernandez was first elected as State Representative in 2006.

On July 30, 2022, Hernandez was elected chairperson of the Democratic Party of Illinois by the Illinois Democratic State Central Committee. She unseated incumbent chairperson Robin Kelly. Hernandez had been endorsed by Illinois Governor J. B. Pritzker and Jesús "Chuy" García prior to the election.

== Illinois House of Representatives ==
=== Committees ===
As of July 3, 2022, Representative Hernandez is a member of the following Illinois House committees:

- Appropriations - Elementary & Secondary Education Committee
- Appropriations - Higher Education Committee
- Consumer Protection Committee
- Executive Committee
- Immigration & Human Rights Committee
- Income Tax Subcommittee
- Labor & Commerce Committee
- Redistricting Committee (Chairperson)
- Revenue & Finance Committee
- Rules Committee

== Electoral history ==
Illinois 24th Representative District Democratic Primary, 2006
Party	Candidate	Votes	%
Democratic	Elizabeth "Lisa" Hernandez	3,111	56.74
Democratic	Michelle Chavez (incumbent)	1,509	27.52
Democratic	Roberto Garcia	863	15.74
Total votes		5,483	100.0

Illinois 24th Representative District General Election, 2006
Party	Candidate	Votes	%
Democratic	Elizabeth "Lisa" Hernandez	10,041	78.30
Republican	John Paul Ledvina	2,782	21.70
Total votes		12,823	100.0

Illinois 24th Representative District General Election, 2008
Party	Candidate	Votes	%
Democratic	Elizabeth "Lisa" Hernandez (incumbent)	17,165	100.0
Total votes		17,165	100.0

Illinois 24th Representative District General Election, 2010
Party	Candidate	Votes	%
Democratic	Elizabeth "Lisa" Hernandez (incumbent)	9,699	100.0
Total votes		9,699	100.0

Illinois 24th Representative District Democratic Primary, 2012
Party	Candidate	Votes	%
Democratic	Elizabeth "Lisa" Hernandez (incumbent)	3,754	63.02
Democratic	Robert R. Reyes	1,907	32.01
Democratic	Neftalie Gonzalez	296	4.97
Total votes		5,957	100.0

Illinois 24th Representative District General Election, 2012
Party	Candidate	Votes	%
Democratic	Elizabeth "Lisa" Hernandez (incumbent)	19,249	100.0
Total votes		19,249	100.0

Illinois 24th Representative District General Election, 2014
Party	Candidate	Votes	%
Democratic	Elizabeth "Lisa" Hernandez (incumbent)	12,382	100.0
Total votes		12,382	100.0

Illinois 24th Representative District General Election, 2016
Party	Candidate	Votes	%
Democratic	Elizabeth "Lisa" Hernandez (incumbent)	23,079	79.45
Republican	Andy Kirchoff	5,969	20.55
Total votes		29,048	100.0

Illinois 24th Representative District Democratic Primary, 2018
Party	Candidate	Votes	%
Democratic	Elizabeth "Lisa" Hernandez (incumbent)	6,308	57.67
Democratic	Robert Rafael Reyes	4,630	42.33
Total votes		10,938	100.0

Illinois 24th Representative District General Election, 2018
Party	Candidate	Votes	%
Democratic	Elizabeth "Lisa" Hernandez (incumbent)	19,329	100.0
Total votes		19,329	100.0

Illinois 24th Representative District General Election, 2020
Party	Candidate	Votes	%
Democratic	Elizabeth "Lisa" Hernandez (incumbent)	26,824	100.0
Total votes		26,824	100.0

Illinois 2nd Representative District General Election, 2022
Party	Candidate	Votes	%
Democratic	Elizabeth "Lisa" Hernandez	16,412	100.0
Total votes		16,412	100.0

Party political offices
Preceded by Robin Kelly	Chair of the Illinois Democratic Party; 2022–present	Incumbent
