= Steger, Illinois =

- Village
- logo

- Location of Steger in Cook County, Illinois.

- Location of Illinois in the United States
- Coordinates: 41°28′20″N 87°37′04″W
- Country: United States
- State: Illinois
- Counties: Will, Cook
- Townships: Bloom (Cook), Crete (Will)
- Founded: 1896

Government
  - Village President/Mayor: William Joyce

Area
  - Total: 3.41 sq mi (8.82 km^{2})
  - Land: 3.41 sq mi (8.82 km^{2})
  - Water: 0 sq mi (0.00 km^{2})
- Elevation: 702 ft (214 m)

Population (2020)
  - Total: 9,584
  - Density: 2,815.5/sq mi (1,087.08/km^{2})
- Time zone: UTC-6 (CST)
  - Summer (DST): UTC-5 (CDT)
- ZIP Code(s): 60475
- Area code: 708
- FIPS code: 17-72520
- Wikimedia Commons: Steger, Illinois
- Website: villageofsteger.org

Steger is a village in Cook County and Will County, Illinois, United States. It is 35 miles (56 km) south of Chicago and had a population of 9,584 at the 2020 census.

== History ==
The settlement was founded in 1891 by Chicago real estate interests and initially named Columbia Heights in honor of the 1893 World's Columbian Exposition which the City of Chicago had been preparing to host since 1889.

John Valentine Steger built a piano factory there on a parcel of land south of Chicago Heights that was sited immediately west of the Chicago and Eastern Illinois Railroad tracks and bordered by the tracks, Vincennes Avenue (now Chicago Road) and 33rd and 34th Streets. By 1904, the factory covered 23 acres (9.3 ha) and had a capacity of sixteen thousand pianos per year.

Steger was incorporated in 1896 with 324 residents, at which time John Steger agreed to pay $400 toward incorporation costs with the understanding that the town would change its name to Steger, and he subsequently served two terms as the village's board president. He avoided the issues that had plagued George Pullman in his "model town" by encouraging private home ownership and commerce. By 1920, Steger was called the "piano capital of the world", producing more than a hundred pianos a day. After demand diminished for pianos, the plant closed in 1928.

In 1973, Louis Sherman was elected Village President (Mayor) of the Village of Steger. Sherman was the longest serving Mayor in the history of Steger serving 40 years from 1973 to 2013 having completed his 10th term. Sherman died August 9, 2020, at the age of 92. He was succeeded by Kenneth Peterson Jr. who was elected in 2013.

Peterson served as the 21st Village President/Mayor from 2013 until his death on September 16, 2024. Following Peterson's death the Village had not acting Village President/Mayor until after the April 1, 2025 election when William Joyce, a long-time Village Trustee won. On April 7, 2025, Joyce was selected as "Interim" Village President/Mayor. Joyce was sworn in as the Village of Steger's 22nd Village President/Mayor on May 1, 2025.

== Geography ==
According to the 2010 census, Steger has a total area of 3.45 square miles (8.94 km^{2}), all land.

== Demographics ==
Historical population
Census	Pop.	Note	%±
1900	712		—
1910	2,161		203.5%
1920	2,304		6.6%
1930	2,985		29.6%
1940	3,369		12.9%
1950	4,358		29.4%
1960	6,432		47.6%
1970	8,104		26.0%
1980	9,269		14.4%
1990	8,584		−7.4%
2000	9,682		12.8%
2010	9,570		−1.2%
2020	9,584		0.1%
U.S. Decennial Census; 2010 2020

=== Racial and ethnic composition ===
Steger village, Illinois – Racial and ethnic composition Note: the US Census treats Hispanic/Latino as an ethnic category. This table excludes Latinos from the racial categories and assigns them to a separate category. Hispanics/Latinos may be of any race.
Race / Ethnicity (NH = Non-Hispanic)	Pop 2000	Pop 2010	Pop 2020	% 2000	% 2010	% 2020
White alone (NH)	8,053	6,103	4,536	83.17%	63.77%	47.33%
Black or African American alone (NH)	606	1,818	2,481	6.26%	19.00%	25.89%
Native American or Alaska Native alone (NH)	28	8	12	0.29%	0.08%	0.13%
Asian alone (NH)	46	96	74	0.48%	1.00%	0.77%
Native Hawaiian or Pacific Islander alone (NH)	6	0	2	0.06%	0.00%	0.02%
Other race alone (NH)	16	7	56	0.17%	0.07%	0.58%
Mixed race or Multiracial (NH)	146	181	388	1.51%	1.89%	4.05%
Hispanic or Latino	781	1,357	2,035	8.07%	14.18%	21.23%
Total	9,682	9,570	9,584	100.00%	100.00%	100.00%

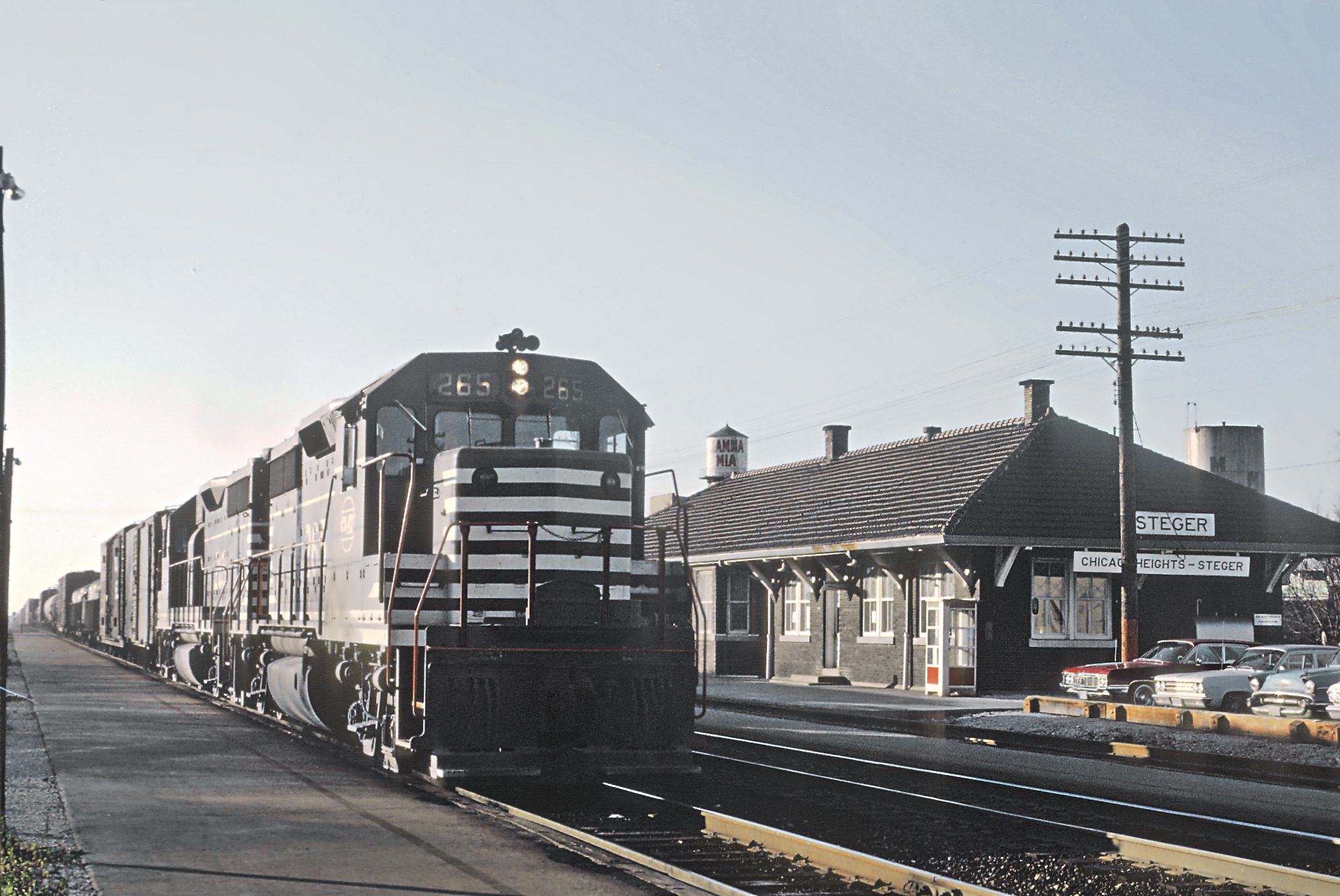
Steger depot, 1965

=== 2020 census ===
As of the 2020 census, Steger had a population of 9,584, with 3,924 households and 2,351 families residing in the village.

The population density was 2,815.51 inhabitants per square mile (1,087.07/km^{2}). There were 4,293 housing units, of which 8.6% were vacant; the homeowner vacancy rate was 2.3% and the rental vacancy rate was 9.3%.

The median age was 37.5 years. 21.8% of residents were under the age of 18 and 15.2% were 65 years of age or older. For every 100 females, there were 92.0 males, and for every 100 females age 18 and over, there were 90.0 males.

Of all households, 28.0% had children under the age of 18 living in them, 36.2% were married-couple households, 22.9% were households with a male householder and no spouse or partner present, and 33.3% were households with a female householder and no spouse or partner present. About 33.4% of all households were made up of individuals, and 12.0% had someone living alone who was 65 years of age or older. 100.0% of residents lived in urban areas, while 0.0% lived in rural areas.

=== Income and poverty ===
The median income for a household in the village was $49,492, and the median income for a family was $67,639. Males had a median income of $48,100 versus $29,272 for females. The per capita income for the village was $26,564. About 8.4% of families and 12.9% of the population were below the poverty line, including 18.0% of those under age 18 and 5.0% of those age 65 or over.

== Parks and recreation ==
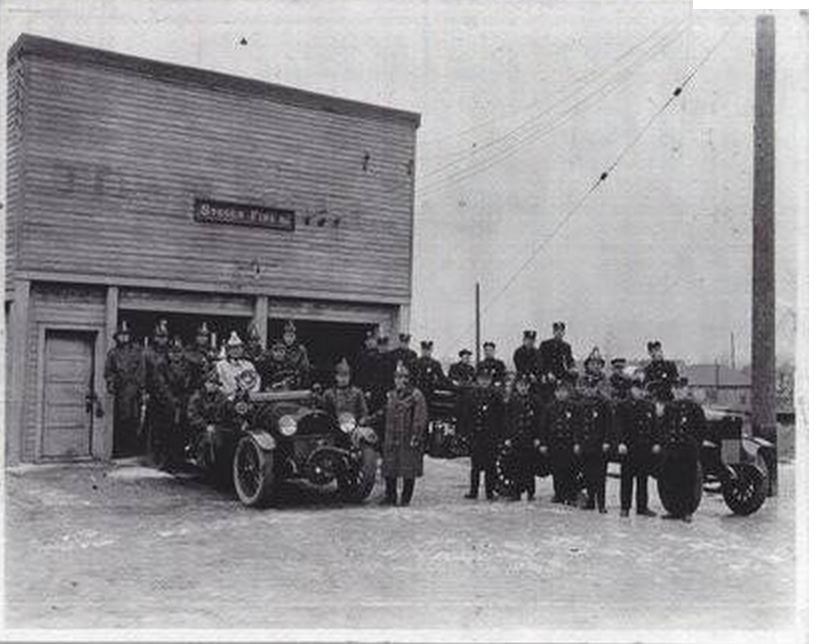
Steger Fire Department, circa 1920

Steger has two main parks: Harold Hecht (Fireman's) Park and Veteran's Park.

== Government ==
The Village of Steger is governed by an elected six-member Board of Trustees and Mayor. The Mayor/Village President is a "part-time" position and he appoints the Village Administrator, currently Joseph Wiszowaty, Treasurer, All Department Heads, Directors and Officers as well as other members of Committees and Commissions with the "advice and consent" of the Village Board of Trustees pursuant to Illinois law.

The mayor is William Joyce. Village Trustees are part-time positions and serve as liaisons for Departments.

The Village's 2024 Annual Audit Report

Steger has one congressional districts. The area in Cook and Will Counties is in Illinois's 2nd congressional district.

== Transportation ==
Pace provides bus service on Route 358 connecting Steger to downtown Chicago Heights and other destinations. Steger is a planned stop on Metra's SouthEast Service, which has been unserved by commuter rail since 1935.

== Notable people ==
- Terry Boers, sports columnist and talk show host
- Luke Butkus, assistant coach for NFL's Jacksonville Jaguars and University of Illinois
- Flora Ciarlo, Illinois state legislator
- Mike Downey, Los Angeles and Chicago newspaper columnist
- Debbie Halvorson, former United States Congresswoman
- John Holecek, linebacker for NFL's Buffalo Bills and San Diego Chargers
