= Crestwood, Illinois =

Village in the United States

- Village
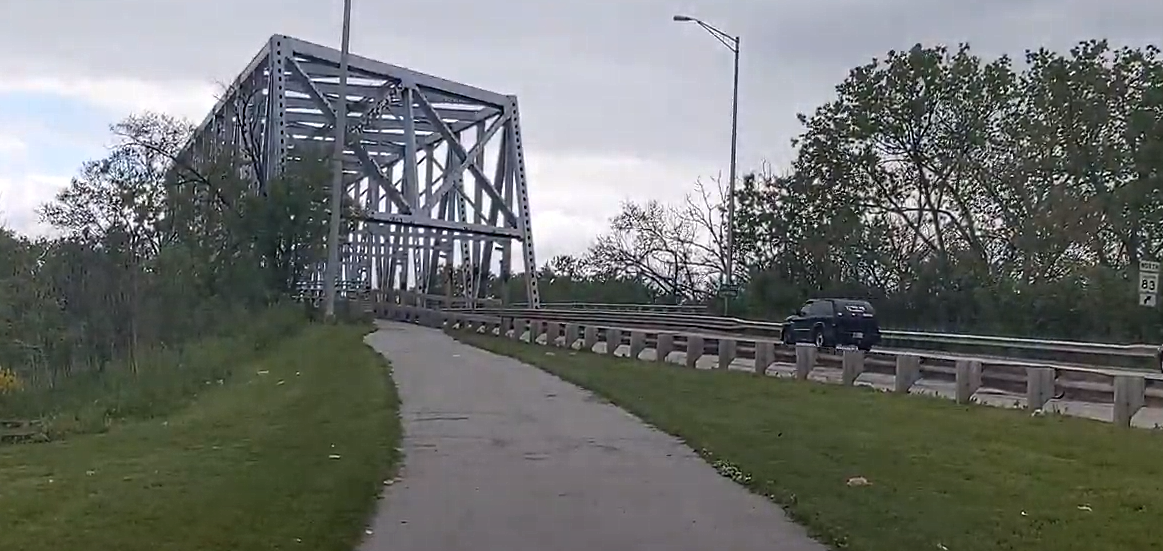
- A bridge over the Cal-Sag Channel on 127th Street

- logo

- Location of Crestwood in Cook County, Illinois.

- Location within Greater Chicago Location within Illinois Location within the United States
- Coordinates: 41°38′43″N 87°44′37″W
- Country: United States
- State: Illinois
- County: Cook
- Townships: Worth, Bremen
- Incorporated: 1928

Government
  - Type: Trustee-village
  - Mayor: Kenneth Klein

Area
  - Total: 3.08 sq mi (7.97 km^{2})
  - Land: 3.05 sq mi (7.90 km^{2})
  - Water: 0.027 sq mi (0.07 km^{2}) 0.98%

Population (2020)
  - Total: 10,826
  - Density: 3,550.5/sq mi (1,370.84/km^{2})

Standard of living (2017-2021)
  - Per capita income: $32,093
  - Median home value: $165,200
- ZIP code(s): 60418
- Area code(s): 708/464
- Geocode: 17-17497
- FIPS code: 17-17497
- Website: crestwood.illinois.gov

Crestwood is a village 23 miles (37 km) southwest of downtown Chicago in Cook County, Illinois, United States. Per the 2020 census, the population was 10,826.

== Geography ==
According to the 2021 census gazetteer files, Crestwood has a total area of 3.08 square miles (7.98 km^{2}), of which 3.05 square miles (7.90 km^{2}) (or 99.09%) is land and 0.03 square miles (0.08 km^{2}) (or 0.91%) is water.

== Demographics ==
Historical population
Census	Pop.	Note	%±
1940	458		—
1950	739		61.4%
1960	1,213		64.1%
1970	5,770		375.7%
1980	10,852		88.1%
1990	10,823		−0.3%
2000	11,251		4.0%
2010	10,950		−2.7%
2020	10,826		−1.1%
U.S. Decennial Census; 2010 2020

=== Racial and ethnic composition ===
Crestwood village, Illinois – Racial and ethnic composition Note: the US Census treats Hispanic/Latino as an ethnic category. This table excludes Latinos from the racial categories and assigns them to a separate category. Hispanics/Latinos may be of any race.
Race / Ethnicity (NH = Non-Hispanic)	Pop 2000	Pop 2010	Pop 2020	% 2000	% 2010	% 2020
White alone (NH)	10,139	9,073	7,710	90.12%	82.86%	71.22%
Black or African American alone (NH)	498	740	1,084	4.43%	6.76%	10.01%
Native American or Alaska Native alone (NH)	12	13	2	0.11%	0.12%	0.02%
Asian alone (NH)	82	105	186	0.73%	0.96%	1.72%
Pacific Islander alone (NH)	0	1	0	0.00%	0.01%	0.00%
Other race alone (NH)	4	10	30	0.04%	0.09%	0.28%
Mixed race or Multiracial (NH)	102	116	266	0.91%	1.06%	2.46%
Hispanic or Latino (any race)	414	892	1,548	3.68%	8.15%	14.30%
Total	11,251	10,950	10,826	100.00%	100.00%	100.00%

=== 2020 census ===
As of the 2020 census, Crestwood had a population of 10,826 people. The population density was 3,518.36 inhabitants per square mile (1,358.45/km^{2}). The median age was 48.5 years. 15.1% of residents were under the age of 18 and 24.7% of residents were 65 years of age or older. For every 100 females there were 87.9 males, and for every 100 females age 18 and over there were 84.2 males age 18 and over.

100.0% of residents lived in urban areas, while 0.0% lived in rural areas.

There were 4,931 households in Crestwood, including 2,281 families. Of all households, 19.6% had children under the age of 18 living in them, 34.7% were married-couple households, 21.8% were households with a male householder and no spouse or partner present, and 37.6% were households with a female householder and no spouse or partner present. About 41.1% of all households were made up of individuals and 18.1% had someone living alone who was 65 years of age or older.

There were 5,202 housing units at an average density of 1,690.61 per square mile (652.75/km^{2}). 5.2% of housing units were vacant. The homeowner vacancy rate was 1.3% and the rental vacancy rate was 7.8%.

=== Income and poverty ===
The median income for a household in the village was $60,541, and the median income for a family was $69,965. Males had a median income of $55,303 versus $31,707 for females. The per capita income for the village was $30,003. About 3.1% of families and 11.0% of the population were below the poverty line, including 9.4% of those under age 18 and 16.8% of those age 65 or over.

== Government and politics ==
=== Government ===
Crestwood is a Council–manager village. The mayor with the approval of the village board appoints a village manager to oversee the daily affairs of the village. The current village manager is William Graffeo, who has served in that role since 2010.

Crestwood's government used to rebate to its residents a portion of their property and other municipal tax payments. It was praised by proponents of small government for its low taxes and cheap government. Crestwood's rebates ended in 2009 so that the village could pay the legal fees associated with the contaminated water scandal.

Crestwood is home to several units of the Illinois National Guard, including Battery B, 2nd Battalion 122 Field Artillery; Company B, 404th Brigade Support Battalion; Company G, 634th Brigade Support Battalion; 108th Signal Company; and the 1744th Transportation Company.

Crestwood Elected Officials
Name	Elected position	Party affiliation
Kenneth Klein	Mayor	Crestwood United Party
Catherine M. Johnson	Village Clerk	Crestwood United Party
Anthony J. Benigno	Trustee	Crestwood United Party
Linda M. Madlener	Trustee	Crestwood United Party
Kevin Wasag	Trustee	Crestwood United Party
Frank Caldario	Trustee	Crestwood United Party
Brian Skala	Trustee	Crestwood United Party
Denise M. Pietrucha	Trustee	Crestwood United Party

On November 17, 2021, Mayor Louis Presta resigned after pleading guilty to a federal bribery case regarding red light cameras installed in the village.

Robert Stranczek, son of former mayor Chester Stranczek. Chester retired in October 2007, and it was then announced that Robert would be taking over his father's role as mayor.

=== Politics ===
Crestwood is currently governed by the Crestwood United Party. The Crestwood United Party is composed of members from both the Republican Party and Democratic Party.

Crestwood is considered competitive on the state and federal level. It has been won by both democrats and republicans in recent years.

==== Political districts ====
Crestwood Political Districts
Level	Name	Position	Party
Federal	Dick Durbin	US Senator	Democratic
Federal	Tammy Duckworth	US Senator	Democratic
Federal	Jonathan Jackson	US Rep IL-1	Democratic
Federal	Sean Casten	US Rep IL-6	Democratic
State	Bill Cunningham	State Sen IL-18	Democratic
State	Emil Jones III	State Sen IL-14	Democratic
State	Mary Gill	State Rep IL-35	Democratic
State	Justin Slaughter	State Rep IL-27	Democratic
State	Bob Rita	State Rep Il-28	Democratic
County	Monica Gordon	Commissioner District 5	Democratic
County	Donna Miller	Commissioner District 6	Democratic
County	Sean Morrison	Commissioner District 17	Republican

== Transportation ==
Crestwood is served by Pace routes 383 and 385. Routes 383 and 385 terminate at Midway station, the terminus of the CTA Orange Line.

While Crestwood does not have rail service, it is in close proximity to Midlothian station which is served by Metra's Rock Island District to LaSalle Street.

== Sports teams ==
The Windy City ThunderBolts, a professional baseball team playing in the Frontier League (FL), play at Ozinga Field in Crestwood since 1995. They are the only professional sport team located in Crestwood.

== Education ==
Delia M. Turner Elementary School, a Pre-K - Kindergarten school of the Posen-Robbins School District 143½, is within Crestwood.

Nathan Hale Elementary School is another elementary school in the area.Nathan Hale Elementary School

Kolmar Elementary School Midlothian School District 143 - Midlothian School District 143

== Notable people ==
- Ron Mahay, pitcher for eight Major League Baseball teams
- Joan Patricia Murphy, Illinois politician
- Chester Stranczek, former mayor

== Water contamination ==
In April 2009, the Chicago Tribune in an investigative article titled "Poison in the Well", reported that the water from a well used to supply residents with drinking water had been contaminated with chemicals (including two linked to the known carcinogen perchloroethylene) from dry cleaning solvents. Village of Crestwood officials, including Mayor Robert Stranczek, and the former mayor Chester Stranczek, were accused of secretly and illegally using the well and lying to regulatory authorities in order to cover that up. The ensuing investigation has generated three class-action lawsuits, two wrongful death lawsuits, and several federal raids. Tricia Krause, a mother of a son who had leukemia for six years and a daughter who had a brain tumor alerted the USEPA of the wrongdoings of the Village of Crestwood officials.

In April 2013, certified water operator Frank Scaccia pleaded guilty to one count of making a false statement. Crestwood's police chief and former water supervisor, Theresa Neubauer, was also found guilty of making false statements to regulators. Former Mayor Chester Stranczek was declared not fit to stand trial due to dementia.

== See also ==
- Crestwood Public Library
