= McCook, Illinois =

- Village
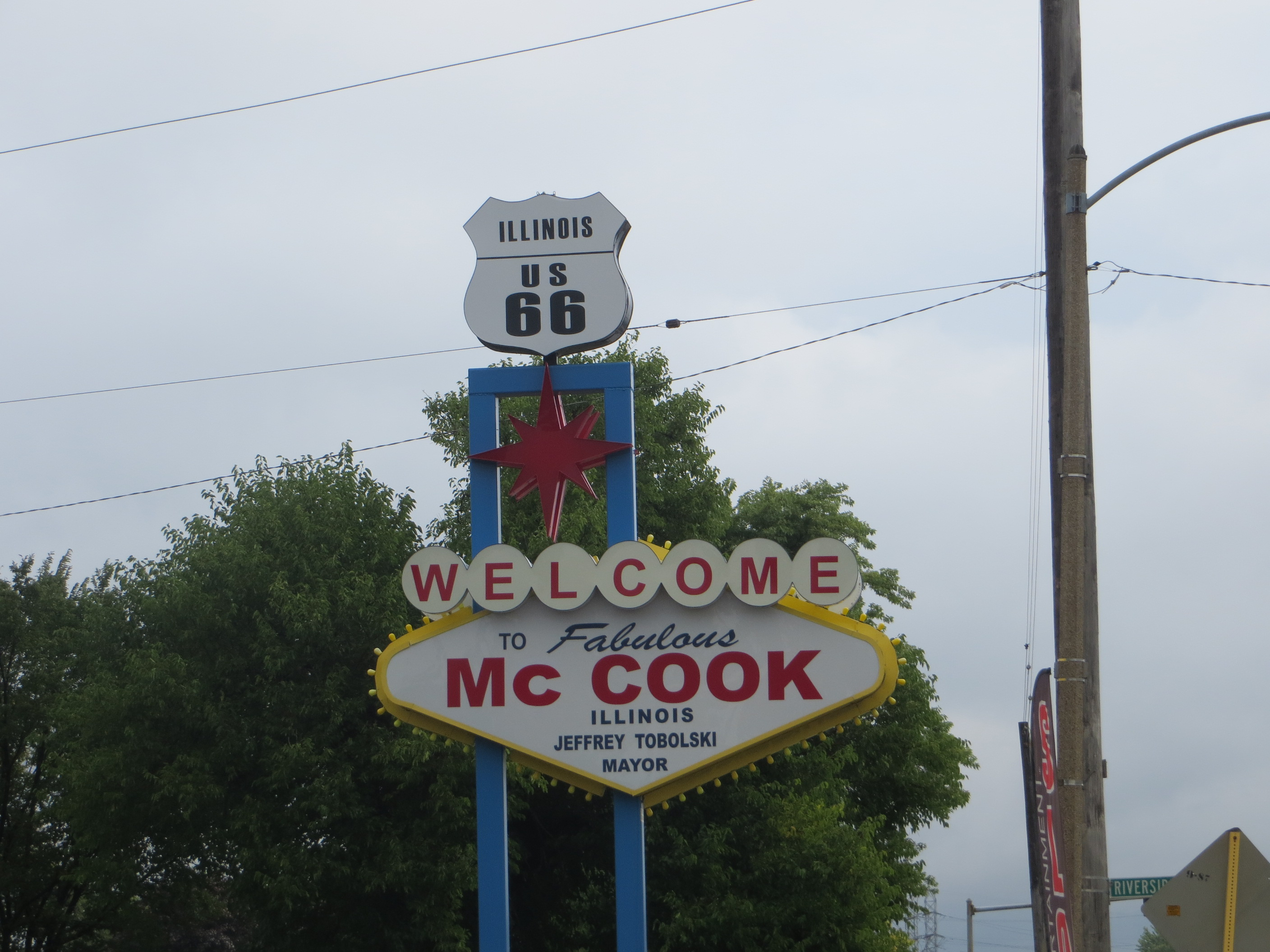
- McCook welcome sign, inspired by the Welcome to Fabulous Las Vegas sign

- Seal

- Location of McCook in Cook County, Illinois.

- Location within Greater Chicago Location within Illinois Location within the United States
- Coordinates: 41°47′55″N 87°49′57″W
- Country: United States
- State: Illinois
- County: Cook

Government
  - Mayor: Terrance M. Carr, Jr. (acting mayor)

Area
  - Total: 2.64 sq mi (6.83 km^{2})
  - Land: 2.61 sq mi (6.77 km^{2})
  - Water: 0.019 sq mi (0.05 km^{2})

Population (2020)
  - Total: 249
  - Density: 95.3/sq mi (36.78/km^{2})
- Time zone: UTC-6 (CST)
  - Summer (DST): UTC-5 (CDT)
- ZIP Code(s): 60525
- Area code: 708
- FIPS code: 17-45564
- Wikimedia Commons: McCook, Illinois
- Website: www.villageofmccook.org

McCook is a village in Cook County, Illinois, United States, and is an industrial suburb of Chicago. As of the 2020 census, the village population was 249, which is the lowest population of all municipalities in the county.

== History ==
McCook was named for John J. McCook, a late 19th-century director of the Santa Fe Railroad and a former Civil War officer. McCook station was served by the railroad in the town. The Outlaws Motorcycle Club was established in McCook in 1935 when Old Route 66 passed through the town. In 1958, six people were killed in an explosion at a Reynolds Metals plant. In 1995, the former Universal Oil Products Riverside Laboratory in McCook was awarded with National Historic Chemical Landmark status.

In October 2019 the village offices were raided by the FBI in search of evidence that the village willingly conducted business with contractors they knew to be fronts for Mike Madigan's racketeering operation. In exchange, Madigan killed a bill that would have blocked sitting mayors from serving on the Cook County Board of Commissioners in order that McCook's mayor Jeff Tobolski could keep his office. Tobolski would plead guilty to extortion conspiracy in 2020 but was not prosecuted until 2025, when he was sentenced to 4 years in prison to start in January 2026, but died before he could be incarcerated.

McCook offered to become the site of a new stadium for the Chicago Bears in 2026. The village's mayor Terrance Carr submitted a formal proposal to the Bears to construct a new stadium and entertainment district on a former quarry to the bemusement of the nearly 250 residents. The proposal would have been entirely financed by a private developer Carr refused to disclose. In April 2026 Carr was elected chairman of the Cook County Republican Party.

== Geography ==
McCook is located at 41°47′55″N 87°49′57″W (41.798542, -87.832432).

McCook has a total area of 2.64 square miles (6.84 km^{2}), of which 2.61 square miles (6.76 km^{2}) (or 99.20%) is land and 0.02 square miles (0.05 km^{2}) (or 0.80%) is water.

McCook is home to a small population but a large amount of heavy industry, resulting in a large tax base.

== Demographics ==
Historical population
Census	Pop.	Note	%±
1930	367		—
1940	315		−14.2%
1950	361		14.6%
1960	441		22.2%
1970	333		−24.5%
1980	303		−9.0%
1990	235		−22.4%
2000	254		8.1%
2010	228		−10.2%
2020	249		9.2%
U.S. Decennial Census

As of the 2020 census there were 249 people, 107 households, and 87 families residing in the village. The population density was 94.50 inhabitants per square mile (36.49/km^{2}). There were 113 housing units at an average density of 42.88 per square mile (16.56/km^{2}). The racial makeup of the village was 64.26% White, 1.20% Asian, 10.44% from other races, and 24.10% from two or more races. Hispanic or Latino of any race were 36.55% of the population.

There were 107 households, out of which 41.1% had children under the age of 18 living with them, 50.47% were married couples living together, 22.43% had a female householder with no husband present, and 18.69% were non-families. 16.82% of all households were made up of individuals, and 11.21% had someone living alone who was 65 years of age or older. The average household size was 3.18 and the average family size was 2.96.

The village's age distribution consisted of 24.9% under the age of 18, 13.6% from 18 to 24, 21.7% from 25 to 44, 17% from 45 to 64, and 22.7% who were 65 years of age or older. The median age was 31.4 years. For every 100 females, there were 108.6 males. For every 100 females age 18 and over, there were 101.7 males.

The median income for a household in the village was $75,417, and the median income for a family was $65,417. Males had a median income of $50,714 versus $33,750 for females. The per capita income for the village was $28,757. About 3.4% of families and 5.0% of the population were below the poverty line, including 3.8% of those under age 18 and 5.6% of those age 65 or over.

McCook village, Illinois – Racial and ethnic composition Note: the US Census treats Hispanic/Latino as an ethnic category. This table excludes Latinos from the racial categories and assigns them to a separate category. Hispanics/Latinos may be of any race.
Race / Ethnicity (NH = Non-Hispanic)	Pop 2000	Pop 2010	Pop 2020	% 2000	% 2010	% 2020
White alone (NH)	229	161	141	90.16%	70.61%	56.63%
Black or African American alone (NH)	0	0	0	0.00%	0.00%	0.00%
Native American or Alaska Native alone (NH)	0	0	0	0.00%	0.00%	0.00%
Asian alone (NH)	0	0	3	0.00%	0.00%	1.20%
Pacific Islander alone (NH)	0	0	0	0.00%	0.00%	0.00%
Other race alone (NH)	5	0	3	1.97%	0.00%	1.20%
Mixed race or Multiracial (NH)	0	2	11	0.00%	0.88%	4.42%
Hispanic or Latino (any race)	20	65	91	7.87%	28.51%	36.55%
Total	254	228	249	100.00%	100.00%	100.00%

== Government ==
McCook is located in Illinois's 4th congressional district.

== Economy ==
McCook is home to a large amount of heavy industry, including portions of Vulcan Materials Company McCook Quarry, UOP, and the Electro-Motive Diesel (EMD) railroad locomotive plant. Known as the LaGrange plant for its mailing address (McCook does not have its own post office), EMD produced most of their locomotives there from 1935 to 1991, when parent company General Motors moved all final-assembly operations to London, Ontario. The LaGrange plant continues to manufacture locomotive parts and engines, and also serves as the EMD U.S. headquarters.

== Education ==
A part of McCook is served by the Lyons School District 103 and J. Sterling Morton High School District 201's Morton West High School located in Berwyn.

Another part of McCook is served by Lyons Township High School in Western Springs/LaGrange.

== Transportation ==
Pace provides bus service on Route 330 connecting McCook to destinations across the region.
