= 2002 Cook County Board of Commissioners election =

- November 5, 2002

All 17 seats on the Cook County Board of Commissioners 9 seats needed for a majority
	First party	Second party
Party	Democratic	Republican
Seats before	12	5
Seats won	12	5
Seat change	Steady	Steady
Popular vote	877,738	299,652
Percentage	74.55%	25.45%
Swing	▲4.16%	▼4.16%
- Results: Democratic hold Republican hold Vote Share: 60–70% 70–80% 80–90% >90% 50–60% 60–70% >90%

The 2002 Cook County Board of Commissioners election was held on November 5, 2002. It was preceded by a primary election held on March 19, 2002. It coincided with other 2002 Cook County, Illinois, elections (including the election for president of the Cook County Board of Commissioners). It saw all seventeen seats of the Cook County Board of Commissioners up for election to four-year terms.

As these were the first elections held following the 2000 United States census, the seats faced redistricting before this election.

== 1st district ==
Incumbent first-term Commissioner Earlean Collins, a Democrat, was reelected.

=== Primaries ===
==== Democratic ====
Cook County Board of Commissioners 1st district Democratic primary
Party	Candidate	Votes	%
Democratic	Earlean Collins (incumbent)	31,784	66.18
Democratic	Iola McGowan	9,737	20.28
Democratic	Ivan V. Williams	3,765	7.84
Democratic	Luther Franklin Spence	2,738	5.70
Total votes		48,024	100

==== Republican ====
No candidates, ballot-certified or formal write-in, ran in the Republican primary. The Republican Party ultimately nominated Robin Lee Meyer.

=== General election ===
Cook County Board of Commissioners 1st district election
Party	Candidate	Votes	%
Democratic	Earlean Collins (incumbent)	68,055	89.83
Republican	Robin Lee Meyer	7,707	10.17
Total votes		75,762	100

== 2nd district ==
Incumbent fourth-term Commissioner Bobbie L. Steele, a Democrat, was reelected, running unopposed in both the primary and general election.

=== Primaries ===
==== Democratic ====
Cook County Board of Commissioners 2nd district Democratic primary
Party	Candidate	Votes	%
Democratic	Bobbie L. Steele (incumbent)	35,617	100
Total votes		35,617	100

==== Republican ====
No candidates, ballot-certified or formal write-in, ran in the Republican primary.

=== General election ===
Cook County Board of Commissioners 2nd district election
Party	Candidate	Votes	%
Democratic	Bobbie L. Steele (incumbent)	59,011	100
Total votes		59,011	100

== 3rd district ==
Incumbent Commissioner Jerry Butler, a Democrat who first assumed the office in 1985, was reelected, running unopposed in both the primary and general election.

=== Primaries ===
==== Democratic ====
Cook County Board of Commissioners 3rd district Democratic primary
Party	Candidate	Votes	%
Democratic	Jerry "Iceman" Butler (incumbent)	52,307	100
Total votes		52,307	100

==== Republican ====
No candidates, ballot-certified or formal write-in, ran in the Republican primary.

=== General election ===
Cook County Board of Commissioners 3rd district election
Party	Candidate	Votes	%
Democratic	Jerry "Iceman" Butler (incumbent)	76,883	100
Total votes		76,883	100

== 4th district ==
Incumbent Commissioner John Stroger, a Democrat, was reelected.

=== Primaries ===
==== Democratic ====
Cook County Board of Commissioners 4th district Democratic primary
Party	Candidate	Votes	%
Democratic	John H. Stroger, Jr. (incumbent)	63,687	100
Total votes		63,687	100

==== Republican ====
Cook County Board of Commissioners 4th district Republican primary
Party	Candidate	Votes	%
Republican	Nathan Peoples	1,434	100
Total votes		1,434	100

=== General election ===
Cook County Board of Commissioners 4th district election
Party	Candidate	Votes	%
Democratic	John H. Stroger, Jr. (incumbent)	86,415	93.12
Republican	Nathan Peoples	6,385	6.88
Total votes		92,800	100

== 5th district ==
Incumbent second-term Commissioner Deborah Sims, a Democrat, was reelected.

=== Primaries ===
==== Democratic ====
Cook County Board of Commissioners 5th district Democratic primary
Party	Candidate	Votes	%
Democratic	Deborah Sims (incumbent)	35,249	66.67
Democratic	Earl B. King	6,344	12.00
Democratic	Robert E. Fox Jr.	6,093	11.53
Democratic	Carolyn Alexander Croswell	5,182	9.80
Total votes		52,868	100

==== Republican ====
Cook County Board of Commissioners 5th district Republican primary
Party	Candidate	Votes	%
Republican	Daniel "Dan" Wooten	3,957	
Total votes		3,957	100

=== General election ===
Republican primary winner Daniel "Dan" Wooten withdrew and was not replaced on the ballot.

Cook County Board of Commissioners 5th district election
Party	Candidate	Votes	%
Democratic	Deborah Sims (incumbent)	76,702	100
Total votes		76,702	100

== 6th district ==
Incumbent first-term Commissioner William Moran, a Democrat, unsuccessfully sought reelection. Joan Patricia Murphy defeated him for the Democratic nomination, and won the general election unopposed.

Incumbent Moran had been a perennial candidate who, in the 1998 general election, had won an upset victory over incumbent then-Republican Barclay "Bud" Fleming.

Barclay "Bud" Fleming, who had been ousted in 1998, also unsuccessfully sought the Democratic nomination for this election.

=== Primaries ===
==== Democratic ====
Cook County Board of Commissioners 6th district Democratic primary
Party	Candidate	Votes	%
Democratic	Joan Patricia Murphy	9,905	29.85
Democratic	John A. Daly	7,846	23.65
Democratic	Jerry Hurckes	6,756	20.36
Democratic	Karla Ostantowski Fiaoni	3,024	9.11
Democratic	Barclay "Bud" Fleming	2,843	8.57
Democratic	William R. Moran (incumbent)	2,807	8.46
Total votes		33,181	100

==== Republican ====
No candidates, ballot-certified or formal write-in, ran in the Republican primary.

=== General election ===
Cook County Board of Commissioners 6th district election
Party	Candidate	Votes	%
Democratic	Joan Patricia Murphy	66,238	100
Total votes		66,238	100

== 7th district ==
Incumbent second-term Commissioner Joseph Mario Moreno, a Democrat, was reelected.

=== Primaries ===
==== Democratic ====
Cook County Board of Commissioners 7th district Democratic primary
Party	Candidate	Votes	%
Democratic	Joseph Mario Moreno (incumbent)	19,417	100
Total votes		19,417	100

==== Republican ====
No candidates, ballot-certified or formal write-in, ran in the Republican primary. The Republican Party ultimately nominated Juan Moreno.

=== General election ===
Cook County Board of Commissioners 7th district election
Party	Candidate	Votes	%
Democratic	Joseph Mario Moreno (incumbent)	26,491	83.13
Republican	Juan Moreno	5,377	16.87
Total votes		31,868	100

== 8th district ==
Incumbent second-term Commissioner Roberto Maldonado, a Democrat, was reelected, running unopposed in both the primary and general election.

=== Primaries ===
==== Democratic ====
Cook County Board of Commissioners 8th district Democratic primary
Party	Candidate	Votes	%
Democratic	Roberto Maldonado (incumbent)	26,514	100
Total votes		26,514	100

==== Republican ====
No candidates, ballot-certified or formal write-in, ran in the Republican primary.

=== General election ===
Cook County Board of Commissioners 8th district election
Party	Candidate	Votes	%
Democratic	Roberto Maldonado (incumbent)	38,741	100
Total votes		38,741	100

== 9th district ==
Incumbent second-term Commissioner Peter N. Silvestri, a Republican, was reelected.

=== Primaries ===
==== Democratic ====
Cook County Board of Commissioners 9th district Democratic primary
Party	Candidate	Votes	%
Democratic	Robert Martwick	26,796	72.04
Democratic	Fred Marshall	10,399	27.96
Total votes		37,195	100

==== Republican ====
Cook County Board of Commissioners 9th district Republican primary
Party	Candidate	Votes	%
Republican	Peter N. Silvestri (incumbent)	14,098	100
Total votes		14,098	100

=== General election ===
Cook County Board of Commissioners 9th district election
Party	Candidate	Votes	%
Republican	Peter N. Silvestri (incumbent)	50,343	53.67
Democratic	Robert Martwick	43,452	46.33
Total votes		93,795	100

== 10th district ==
Incumbent first-term Commissioner Mike Quigley, a Democrat, was reelected.

=== Primaries ===
==== Democratic ====
Cook County Board of Commissioners 10th district Democratic primary
Party	Candidate	Votes	%
Democratic	Mike Quigley (incumbent)	22,357	72.04
Democratic	Mary Ellen E. Daly	12,127	27.96
Total votes		34,484	100

==== Republican ====
No candidates, ballot-certified or formal write-in, ran in the Republican primary.

=== General election ===
Cook County Board of Commissioners 10th district election
Party	Candidate	Votes	%
Democratic	Mike Quigley (incumbent)	60,457	100
Total votes		60,457	100

== 11th district ==
Incumbent Commissioner John P. Daley, a Democrat in office since 1992, was reelected.

=== Primaries ===
==== Democratic ====
Cook County Board of Commissioners 11th district Democratic primary
Party	Candidate	Votes	%
Democratic	John P. Daley (incumbent)	55,926	100
Total votes		55,926	100

==== Republican ====
Cook County Board of Commissioners 11th district Republican primary
Party	Candidate	Votes	%
Republican	William J. Walsh	5,150	100
Total votes		5,150	100

=== General election ===
Cook County Board of Commissioners 11th district election
Party	Candidate	Votes	%
Democratic	John P. Daley (incumbent)	69,422	75.85
Republican	William J. Walsh	22,099	24.15
Total votes		91,521	100

== 12th district ==
Incumbent fourth-term Commissioner Ted Lechowicz, a Democrat, sought reelection, but was defeated in the Democratic primary by Forrest Claypool who went on to win the general election.

=== Primaries ===
==== Democratic ====
Cook County Board of Commissioners 12th district Democratic primary
Party	Candidate	Votes	%
Democratic	Forrest Claypool	20,663	51.13
Democratic	Thaddeus "Ted" Lechowicz (incumbent)	19,748	48.87
Total votes		40,411	100

==== Republican ====
No candidates, ballot-certified or formal write-in, ran in the Republican primary.

=== General election ===
Cook County Board of Commissioners 12th district election
Party	Candidate	Votes	%
Democratic	Forrest Claypool	53,457	100
Total votes		53,457	100

== 13th district ==
Incumbent second-term Commissioner Calvin Sutker, a Democrat, sought reelection, but was defeated in the Democratic primary by Larry Suffredin, who went on to win the general election.

=== Primaries ===
==== Democratic ====
In what was regarded to be an upset, Sutker unseated incumbent Suffredin.

Cook County Board of Commissioners 13th district Democratic primary
Party	Candidate	Votes	%
Democratic	Larry Suffredin	20,994	55.89
Democratic	Calvin R. Sutker (incumbent)	16,567	44.11
Total votes		37,561	100

==== Republican ====
No candidates, ballot-certified or formal write-in, ran in the Republican primary. The Republican Party ultimately nominated Robert D. Shearer, Jr.

=== General election ===
Cook County Board of Commissioners 13th district election
Party	Candidate	Votes	%
Democratic	Larry Suffredin (incumbent)	59,151	69.92
Republican	Robert D. Shearer, Jr.	25,450	30.08
Total votes		84,601	100

== 14th district ==
Incumbent first-term Commissioner Gregg Goslin, a Republican, was reelected.

=== Primaries ===
==== Democratic ====
Cook County Board of Commissioners 14th district Democratic primary
Party	Candidate	Votes	%
Democratic	Allan M. Monat	15,269	100
Total votes		15,269	100

==== Republican ====
Cook County Board of Commissioners 14th district Republican primary
Party	Candidate	Votes	%
Republican	Gregg Goslin (incumbent)	21,288	100
Total votes		21,288	100

=== General election ===
Cook County Board of Commissioners 14th district election
Party	Candidate	Votes	%
Republican	Gregg Goslin (incumbent)	51,691	61.15
Democratic	Allan M. Monat	32,836	38.85
Total votes		84,527	100

== 15th district ==
Incumbent seventh-term Commissioner Carl Hansen, a Republican, was reelected.

=== Primaries ===
==== Democratic ====
Cook County Board of Commissioners 15th district Democratic primary
Party	Candidate	Votes	%
Democratic	Brian J. McPartlin	11,611	100
Total votes		11,611	100

==== Republican ====
Cook County Board of Commissioners 15th district Republican primary
Party	Candidate	Votes	%
Republican	Carl R. Hansen (incumbent)	7,698	43.45
Republican	Michael S. Olszewski	5,837	32.95
Republican	Timothy O. Schneider	4,181	23.60
Total votes		17,716	100

=== General election ===
Cook County Board of Commissioners 15th district election
Party	Candidate	Votes	%
Republican	Carl R. Hansen (incumbent)	38,530	59.56
Democratic	Brian J. McPartlin	26,165	40.44
Total votes		64,695	100

== 16th district ==
Incumbent Commissioner Allan C. Carr, a Republican, sought reelection, but was defeated in the Republican primary by Tony Peraica, who went on to win the general election.

=== Primaries ===
==== Democratic ====
Melrose Park Village President Ronald M. Serpico won the Democratic primary, defeating lawyer William Edward Gomolinski, Patrick "Chico" Hernandez and Stephen J. Mazur.

Cook County Board of Commissioners 16th district Democratic primary
Party	Candidate	Votes	%
Democratic	Ronald M. Serpico, Sr.	9,865	37.58
Democratic	William Edward Gomolinski	8,634	32.89
Democratic	Patrick "Chico" Hernandez	4,648	17.71
Democratic	Stephen J. Mazur	3,105	11.83
Total votes		26,252	100

==== Republican ====
Cook County Board of Commissioners 16th district Republican primary
Party	Candidate	Votes	%
Republican	Tony Peraica	11,813	57.46
Republican	Allan C. Carr (incumbent)	8,746	42.54
Total votes		20,559	100

=== General election ===
Cook County Board of Commissioners 16th district election
Party	Candidate	Votes	%
Republican	Tony Peraica	38,858	53.14
Democratic	Ronald M. Serpico, Sr.	34,262	46.86
Total votes		73,120	100

== 17th district ==
Incumbent fourth-term Commissioner Herb Schumann, a Republican, sought reelection, but was defeated in the Republican primary by Elizabeth Ann Doody Gorman, who went on to win the general election.

=== Primaries ===
==== Democratic ====
Cook County Board of Commissioners 17th district Democratic primary
Party	Candidate	Votes	%
Democratic	Candice Marie Morrison	20,630	100
Total votes		20,630	100

==== Republican ====
Cook County Board of Commissioners 17th district Republican primary
Party	Candidate	Votes	%
Republican	Elizabeth "Liz" Doody Gorman	11,345	51.41
Republican	Herbert T. Schumann, Jr. (incumbent)	10,721	48.59
Total votes		22,066	100

=== General election ===
Democratic primary winner Candice Marie Morrison withdrew before the election.

Cook County Board of Commissioners 17th district election
Party	Candidate	Votes	%
Republican	Elizabeth "Liz" Doody Gorman	53,212	100
Total votes		53,212	100

== Summarizing statistics ==
Contest summary
Party	Seats held before	Nominees	Seats won
Democratic	12	16	12
Republican	5	10	5
Total	—N/a	26	—N/a

Contests by parties contesting
Parties contesting	Total	Democratic wins	Republicans wins
Seats contested by Democratic and Republican nominees	9	5	4
Seats contested only by Democratic nominees	7	7	—N/a
Seats contested only by Republican nominees	1	—N/a	1
Total	17	12	5

Vote summary
Party	Popular vote	Seats won
Democratic	877,738 (74.55%)	12
Republican	299,652 (25.45%)	5
Total	1,177,390	—N/a

Fate of incumbents
Party	Total incumbents	Incumbents that sought reelection/retired	Incumbents that won/lost re-nomination in primaries	Incumbents that won/lost general election
Democratic	12	12 sought reelection 0 retired	9 won re-nomination 3 lost re-nomination	9 won 0 lost
Republican	5	5 sought reelection 0 retired	3 won re-nomination 2 lost re-nomination	3 won 0 lost

Composition of elected board (returning/newly elected members)
Party	Returning members	Newly elected members	Total members
Democratic	9	3	12
Republican	3	2	5
Total	12	5	17
