= Cook County Board of Commissioners 1st district =

- District
- District 1
- Current Board of Commissioners map, 1st district highlighted in red
- Country: United States
- State: Illinois
- County: Cook
- Townships and equal jurisdictions: list: Chicago; Oak Park; Proviso Township

Government
  - Type: District
  - Body: Cook County Board of Commissioners
  - Commissioner: Tara Stamps (D)

Cook County Board of Commissioners 1st district is a single-member electoral district for the Cook County Board of Commissioners currently represented by Tara Stamps, a Democrat.

== History ==
The district was established in 1994, when the board transitioned to holding elections in single-member districts, as opposed to the previous arrangement of having two multi-member districts: one for ten members from the city of Chicago and another for seven members from suburban Cook County.

== Geography ==
Since its inception, the district has covered parts of the West Side of Chicago and parts of the western suburbs of Cook County.

=== 1994 boundaries ===
In its initial 1994 iteration, the district encompassed parts of the West Side of Chicago as well as the western suburbs of Cook County.

=== 2001 redistricting ===
1st district (highlighted in red) as redistricted in 2001

New boundaries were adopted in August 2001, with redistricting taking place following the 2000 United States census.

In regards to townships and equivalent jurisdictions, the district's redistricted boundaries included portions of the city of Chicago, as well as portions of Oak Park and Proviso Townships.

The parts of Chicago which the district encompassed were on the West Side, including the neighborhood of Austin. Other municipalities included Bellwood, Broadview, Maywood, and Oak Park.

=== 2012 redistricting ===
1st district (highlighted in red), as redistricted in 2012

The district, as redistricted in 2012 following the 2010 United States census, included parts of Bellwood, Broadview, Chicago, Forest Park, Hillside, Maywood, North Riverside, Oak Park, and Westchester.

In regards to townships and equivalent jurisdictions, it included portions of the city of Chicago and portions of Oak Park and Proviso Townships.

The parts of Chicago encompassed were on the city's West Side.

The district was 28.93 square miles (18,516.79 acres).

=== 2022 redistricting ===
The district, as redistricted in 2022 following the 2020 United States census, continues to include portions of the city of Chicago and portions of Oak Park and Proviso Townships. Of these three divisions, the largest part of the district is in Oak Park Township. The district contains large segments of Chicago's 27th, 28th, 29th, and 37th wards and small segments of Chicago's 1st, 24th, 32nd, and 36th wards.

The 2022 boundaries include all of the Austin neighborhood of Chicago, the majority of Chicago's West Garfield Park neighborhood, parts of East Garfield Park and Humboldt Park. Small portions of the Northwest Side of Chicago are located in the district. The district also includes the entirety of the suburbs of Bellwood, Forest Park, Maywood, Oak Park, nearly all of the suburb of Broadview, half of the suburb of Westchester, and tiny portions of Hillside and North Riverside.

== Politics ==
All commissioners representing this district, since its inception, have been Democrats.

The district has strongly favored Democrats.

== List of commissioners representing the district ==
| Commissioner | Party | Years | Electoral history |
|---|---|---|---|
| Danny Davis | Democratic | December 1994–January 1997 | Previously served one term as commissioner from Chicago at-large; elected in 1994; resigned in January 1997 to serve in United States House of Representatives |
| Darlena Williams-Burnett | Democratic | 1997–December 1998 | Appointed in 1997; lost reelection in 1998 |
| Earlean Collins | Democratic | December 1998–December, 2014 | Elected in 1998, 2002, 2006, 2010 |
| Richard Boykin | Democratic | December 2014–December 2018 | Elected in 2014; lost reelection in 2018 |
| Brandon Johnson | Democratic | December 2018– May 2023 | Elected in 2018 and 2022; resigned May 15, 2023 to become mayor of Chicago |
| Tara Stamps | Democratic | June 2023–present | Appointed on June 21, 2023; won election in 2024 |

== Election results ==
Cook County Board of Commissioners 1st district general elections
| Year | Winning candidate | Party | Vote (pct) | Opponent | Party | Vote (pct) |
| 1994 | Danny K. Davis | Democratic | 42,530 | Gwendolyn Stanford-Jones | Harold Washington Party | |
| 1998 | Earlean Collins | Democratic | 62,134 (88.80%) | Luther Franklin Spence | Republican | 7,835 (11.20%) |
| 2002 | Earlean Collins | Democratic | 68,055 (89.83%) | Robin Lee Meyer | Republican | 7,707 (10.17%) |
| 2006 | Earlean Collins | Democratic | 69,621 (91.68%) | Henrietta S. Butler | Republican | 6,320 (8.32%) |
| 2010 | Earlean Collins | Democratic | 68,890 (86.13%) | Ronald Lawless | Green | 11,095 (13.87%) |
| 2014 | Richard Boykin | Democratic | 68,305 (99.36%) | Others | Write-ins | 441 (0.64%) |
| 2018 | Brandon Johnson | Democratic | 88,590 (100%) | | | |
| 2022 | Brandon Johnson | Democratic | 71,077 (92.87%) | James Humay | Libertarian | 5,457 (7.13%) |
| 2024 | Tara Stamps | Democratic | 94,353 (89.71%) | James Humay | Libertarian | 10,828 (10.29%) |
| 2026 | Tara Stamps | Democratic | 76,629 (100%) | | | |
