= 2014 Cook County Board of Commissioners election =

- November 4, 2014

All 17 seats on the Cook County Board of Commissioners 9 seats needed for a majority
	First party	Second party
Party	Democratic	Republican
Seats before	13	4
Seats won	13	4
Seat change	Steady	Steady
Popular vote	809,692	239,746
Percentage	77.12%	22.84%
Swing	▲9.82%	▼4.58%
- Results: Democratic hold Republican hold Vote Share: 60–70% >90% 50–60% 60–70% >90%

The 2014 Cook County Board of Commissioners election was held on November 4, 2014. It was preceded by a primary election held on March 18, 2014. It coincided with other 2014 Cook County, Illinois, elections (including the election for president of the Cook County Board of Commissioners). It saw all seventeen seats of the Cook County Board of Commissioners up for election to four-year terms. As these were the first elections held following the 2010 United States census, the seats faced redistricting before this election.

Fifteen members were reelected. One member did not seek reelection and one member was defeated in their party's primary, which meant that a total of two individuals were newly elected. Democrats ran nominees in races for fifteen of the seventeen seats. Republicans ran nominees in races for five seats. In races for twelve seats, Democratic nominees faced no opponents on the ballot. In races for two seats, Republican nominees faced no opponents on the ballot. As a result, only three general election races were contested between Democratic and Republican nominees. As of 2026, this is the most recent election in which Democrats did not run nominees for every seat, and the most recent instance in which the Democratic Party received less than 1 million cumulative votes in regularly-scheduled elections for Cook County Board of Commissioners. It also is the most recent instance in which the Democratic Party won less than fifteen seats and the Republican Party won more than two. It is also the most recent instance where no seats switched parties, as Democrats have gained seats in each of the subsequent three elections.

== Redistricting ==
As these were the first elections held following the 2010 United States census, the seats faced redistricting before this election.

== 1st district ==
Incumbent fourth-term Commissioner Earlean Collins, a Democrat, did not seek reelection. Democrat Richard Boykin was elected to succeed him.

=== Primaries ===
==== Democratic ====
Cook County Board of Commissioners 1st district Democratic primary
Party	Candidate	Votes	%
Democratic	Richard R. Boykin	7,288	30.38
Democratic	Blake Sercye	6,118	25.51
Democratic	Isaac "Ike" Carothers	5,602	23.35
Democratic	Brenda Smith	4,111	17.14
Democratic	Ronald Lawless	868	3.62
Total votes		23,987	100

==== Republican ====
No candidates, ballot-certified or formal write-in, ran in the Republican primary.

=== General election ===
Cook County Board of Commissioners 1st district election
Party	Candidate	Votes	%
Democratic	Richard R. Boykin	68,305	99.36
Write-in	Others	441	0.64
Total votes		68,746	100

== 2nd district ==
Incumbent second-term commissioner Robert Steele, a Democrat, was reelected, running unopposed in both the Democratic primary and general election.

=== Primaries ===
==== Democratic ====
Cook County Board of Commissioners 2nd district Democratic primary
Party	Candidate	Votes	%
Democratic	Robert B. Steele (incumbent)	13,365	100
Total votes		13,365	100

==== Republican ====
No candidates, ballot-certified or formal write-in, ran in the Republican primary.

=== General election ===
Cook County Board of Commissioners 2nd district election
Party	Candidate	Votes	%
Democratic	Robert B. Steele (incumbent)	57,091	100
Total votes		57,091	100

== 3rd district ==
Incumbent Commissioner Jerry Butler, a Democrat who first assumed the office in 1985, was reelected.

=== Primaries ===
==== Democratic ====
Cook County Board of Commissioners 3rd district Democratic primary
Party	Candidate	Votes	%
Democratic	Jerry "Iceman" Butler (incumbent)	19,830	81.79
Democratic	Rosemary Reeves	4,415	18.21
Total votes		24,245	100

==== Republican ====
No candidates, ballot-certified or formal write-in, ran in the Republican primary.

=== General election ===
Cook County Board of Commissioners 3rd district election
Party	Candidate	Votes	%
Democratic	Jerry "Iceman" Butler (incumbent)	77,354	100
Total votes		77,354	100

== 4th district ==
Incumbent Commissioner Stanley Moore, a Democrat who was appointed to the office in 2013, was reelected to a full term.

=== Primaries ===
==== Democratic ====
Cook County Board of Commissioners 4th district Democratic primary
Party	Candidate	Votes	%
Democratic	Stanley S. Moore (incumbent)	15,649	65.24
Democratic	Nicholas "Nick" Smith	4,930	20.55
Democratic	Robert R. McKay	3,290	13.72
Write-in	Others	116	0.48
Total votes		23,985	100

==== Republican ====
No candidates, ballot-certified or formal write-in, ran in the Republican primary.

=== General election ===
Cook County Board of Commissioners 4th district election
Party	Candidate	Votes	%
Democratic	Stanley S. Moore (incumbent)	75,192	100
Total votes		75,192	100

== 5th district ==
Incumbent fifth-term Commissioner Deborah Sims, a Democrat, was reelected.

=== Primaries ===
==== Democratic ====
Cook County Board of Commissioners 5th district Democratic primary
Party	Candidate	Votes	%
Democratic	Deborah Sims (incumbent)	17,320	84.21
Democratic	Timothy "Tim" Parker	3,203	15.57
Write-in	Others	4	0.21
Total votes		20,567	100

==== Republican ====
No candidates, ballot-certified or formal write-in, ran in the Republican primary.

=== General election ===
Cook County Board of Commissioners 5th district election
Party	Candidate	Votes	%
Democratic	Deborah Sims (incumbent)	70,542	100
Total votes		70,542	100

== 6th district ==
Incumbent third-term Commissioner Joan Patricia Murphy, a Democrat, was reelected.

=== Primaries ===
==== Democratic ====
Cook County Board of Commissioners 6th district Democratic primary
Party	Candidate	Votes	%
Democratic	Joan Patricia Murphy (incumbent)	12,359	100
Total votes		12,359	100

==== Republican ====
No candidates, ballot-certified or formal write-in, ran in the Republican primary.

=== General election ===
Cook County Board of Commissioners 6th district election
Party	Candidate	Votes	%
Democratic	Joan Patricia Murphy (incumbent)	65,796	100
Total votes		65,796	100

== 7th district ==
Incumbent first-term Commissioner Jesús "Chuy" García, a Democrat, was reelected.

=== Primaries ===
==== Democratic ====
Cook County Board of Commissioners 7th district Democratic primary
Party	Candidate	Votes	%
Democratic	Jesus G. Garcia (incumbent)	6,416	100
Total votes		6,416	100

==== Republican ====
No candidates, ballot-certified or formal write-in, ran in the Republican primary.

=== General election ===
Cook County Board of Commissioners 7th district election
Party	Candidate	Votes	%
Democratic	Jesus G. Garcia (incumbent)	25,320	100
Total votes		25,320	100

== 8th district ==
Incumbent Commissioner Edwin Reyes, a Democrat, lost reelection, being unseated in the Democratic primary by Luis Arroyo Jr., who went on to win the general election unopposed.

Reyes had first been appointed in 2009 (after Roberto Maldonado resigned to serve a Chicago alderman), and had been elected to a full term in 2010.

=== Primaries ===
==== Democratic ====
Cook County Board of Commissioners 8th district Democratic primary
Party	Candidate	Votes	%
Democratic	Luis Arroyo Jr.	8,084	54.91
Democratic	Edwin "Eddie" Reyes (incumbent)	6,560	44.56
Write-in	Others	77	0.52
Total votes		14,721	100

==== Republican ====
No candidates, ballot-certified or formal write-in, ran in the Republican primary.

=== General election ===
Cook County Board of Commissioners 8th district election
Party	Candidate	Votes	%
Democratic	Luis Arroyo Jr.	37,529	100
Total votes		37,529	100

== 9th district ==
Incumbent fifth-term Commissioner Peter N. Silvestri, a Republican, was reelected.

=== Primaries ===
==== Democratic ====
Cook County Board of Commissioners 9th district Democratic primary
Party	Candidate	Votes	%
Democratic	Frank L. Mc Partlin	8,392	100
Total votes		8,392	100

==== Republican ====
Cook County Board of Commissioners 9th district Republican primary
Party	Candidate	Votes	%
Republican	Peter N. Silvestri (incumbent)	15,178	100
Total votes		15,178	100

=== General election ===
Cook County Board of Commissioners 9th district election
Party	Candidate	Votes	%
Republican	Peter N. Silvestri (incumbent)	51,290	63.06
Democratic	Frank L. Mc Partlin	30,040	36.94
Total votes		81,330	100

== 10th district ==
Incumbent Commissioner Bridget Gainer, a Democrat first appointed in 2009 and elected outright to a full-term in 2010, was reelected, running unopposed in both the Democratic primary and general election.

=== Primaries ===
==== Democratic ====
Cook County Board of Commissioners 10th district Democratic primary
Party	Candidate	Votes	%
Democratic	Bridget Gainer (incumbent)	12,640	100
Total votes		12,640	100

==== Republican ====
No candidates, ballot-certified or formal write-in, ran in the Republican primary.

=== General election ===
Cook County Board of Commissioners 10th district election
Party	Candidate	Votes	%
Democratic	Bridget Gainer (incumbent)	64,914	100
Total votes		64,914	100

== 11th district ==
Incumbent Commissioner John P. Daley, a Democrat in office since 1992, was reelected.

=== Primaries ===
==== Democratic ====
Cook County Board of Commissioners 11th district Democratic primary
Party	Candidate	Votes	%
Democratic	John P. Daley (incumbent)	18,443	100
Total votes		18,443	100

==== Republican ====
Cook County Board of Commissioners 11th district Republican primary
Party	Candidate	Votes	%
Republican	Carl Segvich	7,178	100
Total votes		7,178	100

=== General election ===
Cook County Board of Commissioners 11th district election
Party	Candidate	Votes	%
Democratic	John P. Daley (incumbent)	54,093	68.61
Republican	Carl Segvich	24,744	31.39
Total votes		78,837	100

== 12th district ==
Incumbent first-term Commissioner John Fritchey, a Democrat, was reelected, running unopposed in both the Democratic primary and general election.

=== Primaries ===
==== Democratic ====
Cook County Board of Commissioners 12th district Democratic primary
Party	Candidate	Votes	%
Democratic	John Fritchey (incumbent)	10,709	100
Total votes		10,709	100

==== Republican ====
No candidates, ballot-certified or formal write-in, ran in the Republican primary.

=== General election ===
Cook County Board of Commissioners 12th district election
Party	Candidate	Votes	%
Democratic	John Fritchey (incumbent)	51,499	100
Total votes		51,499	100

== 13th district ==
Incumbent third-term Commissioner Larry Suffredin, a Democrat, was reelected, running unopposed in both the Democratic primary and general election.

=== Primaries ===
==== Democratic ====
Cook County Board of Commissioners 13th district Democratic primary
Party	Candidate	Votes	%
Democratic	Larry Suffredin (incumbent)	16,065	100
Total votes		16,065	100

==== Republican ====
No candidates, ballot-certified or formal write-in, ran in the Republican primary.

=== General election ===
Cook County Board of Commissioners 13th district election
Party	Candidate	Votes	%
Democratic	Larry Suffredin (incumbent)	68,715	100
Total votes		68,715	100

== 14th district ==
Incumbent fourth-term Commissioner Gregg Goslin, a Republican, was reelected, running unopposed in both the Republican primary and general election.

=== Primaries ===
==== Democratic ====
No candidates, ballot-certified or formal write-in, ran in the Democratic primary.

==== Republican ====
Cook County Board of Commissioners 14th district Republican primary
Party	Candidate	Votes	%
Republican	Gregg Goslin (incumbent)	16,258	100
Total votes		16,258	100

=== General election ===
Cook County Board of Commissioners 14th district election
Party	Candidate	Votes	%
Republican	Gregg Goslin (incumbent)	66,217	100
Total votes		66,217	100

== 15th district ==
Incumbent second-term Commissioner Tim Schneider, a Republican, was reelected.

=== Primaries ===
==== Democratic ====
Cook County Board of Commissioners 15th district Democratic primary
Party	Candidate	Votes	%
Democratic	Michael A Urban	4,165	100
Total votes		4,165	100

==== Republican ====
Cook County Board of Commissioners 15th district Republican primary
Party	Candidate	Votes	%
Republican	Timothy O. Schneider (incumbent)	13,332	100
Total votes		13,332	100

=== General election ===
Cook County Board of Commissioners 15th district election
Party	Candidate	Votes	%
Republican	Timothy O. Schneider (incumbent)	40,569	58.83
Democratic	Michael A Urban	28,392	41.17
Total votes		68,961	100

== 16th district ==
Incumbent first-term Commissioner Jeff Tobolski, a Democrat, was reelected, running unopposed in both the Democratic primary and general election.

=== Primaries ===
==== Democratic ====
Cook County Board of Commissioners 16th district Democratic primary
Party	Candidate	Votes	%
Democratic	Jeff Tobolski (incumbent)	9,183	100
Total votes		9,183	100

==== Republican ====
No candidates, ballot-certified or formal write-in, ran in the Republican primary.

=== General election ===
Cook County Board of Commissioners 16th district election
Party	Candidate	Votes	%
Democratic	Jeff Tobolski (incumbent)	34,910	100
Total votes		34,910	100

== 17th district ==
Incumbent third-term Commissioner Elizabeth Ann Doody Gorman, a Republican, was reelected.

=== Primaries ===
==== Democratic ====
Cook County Board of Commissioners 17th district Democratic primary
Party	Candidate	Votes	%
Democratic	Jim Hickey	7,693	100
Total votes		7,693	100

==== Republican ====
Cook County Board of Commissioners 17th district Republican primary
Party	Candidate	Votes	%
Republican	Elizabeth "Liz" Doody Gorman (incumbent)	13,292	59.25
Republican	Barbara Bellar	9,142	40.75
Total votes		22,434	100

=== General election ===
Cook County Board of Commissioners 17th district election
Party	Candidate	Votes	%
Republican	Elizabeth "Liz" Doody Gorman (incumbent)	56,926	100
Total votes		56,926	100

== Summarizing statistics ==
Contest summary
Party	Seats held before	Seats contested	Seats won
Democratic	13	15	13
Republican	4	5	4

Contests by parties contesting
Parties contesting	Total	Democratic wins	Republicans wins
Seats contested by Democratic and Republican nominees	3	1	2
Seats contested only by Democratic nominees	12	12	—N/a
Seats contested only by Republican nominees	2	—N/a	2

Vote summary
Party	Popular vote	Seats won
Democratic	809,692 (77.12%)	13
Republican	239,746 (22.84%)	4
Other (write-in)	441 (0.04%)	0
Total	1,049,879	—N/a

Fate of incumbents
Party	Total incumbents	Incumbents that sought reelection/retired	Incumbents that won/lost re-nomination in primaries	Incumbents that won/lost general election
Democratic	13	11 sought reelection 2 retired	11 won re-nomination 0 lost renomination	11 won 0 lost
Republican	4	4 sought reelection 0 retired	4 won re-nomination 0 lost renomination	4 won 0 lost

Composition of elected board (returning/newly elected members)
Party	Returning members	Newly elected members
Democratic	11	2
Republican	4	0
