= 2006 Cook County Board of Commissioners election =

- November 7, 2006

All 17 seats on the Cook County Board of Commissioners 9 seats needed for a majority
	First party	Second party
Party	Democratic	Republican
Seats before	12	5
Seats won	12	5
Seat change	Steady	Steady
Popular vote	924,939	276,925
Percentage	76.45%	22.89%
Swing	▲1.90%	▼2.56%
- Results: Democratic hold Republican hold Vote Share: 70–80% 80–90% >90% 50–60%

The 2006 Cook County Board of Commissioners election was held on November 7, 2006. It was preceded by a primary election held on March 21, 2006. It coincided with other 2006 Cook County, Illinois, elections (including the election for president of the Cook County Board of Commissioners). It saw all seventeen seats of the Cook County Board of Commissioners up for election to four-year terms.

Fifteen members were reelected. One incumbent Democrat withdrew from their election after being renominated, while one incumbent Republican lost his primary. No seat changed parties. As of 2026, this remains the last instance in which the Democratic Party won less than 13 seats, and the last instance in which the Republican Party won more than 4 seats.

Democrats ran nominees in the races for all seventeen seats. Republicans ran nominees in ten races, while the Green Party ran a nominee in a single race. Five Democratic nominees faced no opponents in the general election, four of whom had also faced no opponents in their Democratic Party primary.

== 1st district ==
Incumbent second-term Commissioner Earlean Collins, a Democrat, was reelected.

=== Primaries ===
==== Democratic ====
Cook County Board of Commissioners 1st district Democratic primary
Party	Candidate	Votes	%
Democratic	Earlean Collins (incumbent)	39,232	100
Total votes		39,232	100

==== Republican ====
No candidates, ballot-certified or formal write-in, ran in the Republican primary. The Republican Party ultimately nominated Henrietta S. Butler.

=== General election ===
Cook County Board of Commissioners 1st district election
Party	Candidate	Votes	%
Democratic	Earlean Collins (incumbent)	69,621	91.68
Republican	Henrietta S. Butler	6,320	8.32
Total votes		75,941	100

== 2nd district ==
Incumbent commissioner Robert Steele, a Democrat, was reelected. He had been appointed to succeed his mother Bobbie L. Steele, after they were appointed President of the Cook County Board of Commissioners.

=== Primaries ===
==== Democratic ====
Cook County Board of Commissioners 2nd district Democratic primary
Party	Candidate	Votes	%
Democratic	Robert B. Steele (incumbent)	15,777	56.71
Democratic	Desiree Grode	7,852	28.23
Democratic	Frank M. Bass	3,461	12.44
Democratic	Erold Elysee	729	2.62
Total votes		27,819	100

==== Republican ====
No candidates, ballot-certified or formal write-in, ran in the Republican primary. The Republican Party ultimately nominated Scott W. Kummer.

=== General election ===
Cook County Board of Commissioners 2nd district election
Party	Candidate	Votes	%
Democratic	Robert B. Steele (incumbent)	59,668	88.18
Green	Scott W. Kummer	7,996	11.82
Total votes		67,664	100

== 3rd district ==
Incumbent Commissioner Jerry Butler, a Democrat who first assumed the office in 1985, was reelected.

=== Primaries ===
==== Democratic ====
Cook County Board of Commissioners 3rd district Democratic primary
Party	Candidate	Votes	%
Democratic	Jerry "Iceman" Butler (incumbent)	46,216	100
Total votes		46,216	100

==== Republican ====
No candidates, ballot-certified or formal write-in, ran in the Republican primary. The Republican Party ultimately nominated Maurice Perkins.

=== General election ===
Cook County Board of Commissioners 3rd district election
Party	Candidate	Votes	%
Democratic	Jerry "Iceman" Butler (incumbent)	73,932	89.86
Republican	Marie J. "Jenny" Wohadlo	8,340	10.14
Total votes		82,272	100

== 4th district ==
Then-incumbent Commissioner John Stroger originally sought reelection, winning the Democratic primary, but backed-out due to health issues (and also resigned his seat), and was replaced as Democratic nominee by William Beavers, who went to win the general election.

=== Primaries ===
==== Democratic ====
Cook County Board of Commissioners 4th district Democratic primary
Party	Candidate	Votes	%
Democratic	John Stroger, Jr. (incumbent)	55,244	100
Total votes		55,244	100

==== Republican ====
No candidates, ballot-certified or formal write-in, ran in the Republican primary. Ultimately, the Republican Party nominated Ann Rochelle Hunter.

=== General election ===
Cook County Board of Commissioners 4th district election
Party	Candidate	Votes	%
Democratic	William Beavers	78,252	91.54
Republican	Ann Rochelle Hunter	7,234	8.46
Total votes		85,486	100

== 5th district ==
Incumbent third-term Commissioner Deborah Sims, a Democrat, was reelected.

=== Primaries ===
==== Democratic ====
Cook County Board of Commissioners 5th district Democratic primary
Party	Candidate	Votes	%
Democratic	Deborah Sims (incumbent)	32,103	
Democratic	Dian M. Powell	12,156	
Total votes		44,259	100

==== Republican ====
No candidates, ballot-certified or formal write-in, ran in the Republican primary.

=== General election ===
Cook County Board of Commissioners 5th district election
Party	Candidate	Votes	%
Democratic	Deborah Sims (incumbent)	74,988	100
Total votes		74,988	100

== 6th district ==
Incumbent first-term Commissioner Joan Patricia Murphy, a Democrat, was reelected.

=== Primaries ===
==== Democratic ====
Cook County Board of Commissioners 6th district Democratic primary
Party	Candidate	Votes	%
Democratic	Joan Patricia Murphy (incumbent)	16,338	56.52
Democratic	Nicholas K. Chambers	7,013	24.26
Democratic	Robert L. Ryan, Jr.	5,558	19.23
Total votes		28,909	100

==== Republican ====
Cook County Board of Commissioners 6th district Republican primary
Party	Candidate	Votes	%
Republican	Michael Hawkins	7,190	100
Total votes		7,190	100

=== General election ===
Cook County Board of Commissioners 6th district election
Party	Candidate	Votes	%
Democratic	Joan Patricia Murphy (incumbent)	56,814	73.93
Republican	Michael Hawkins	20,038	26.07
Total votes		76,852	100

== 7th district ==
Incumbent third-term Commissioner Joseph Mario Moreno, a Democrat, was reelected.

=== Primaries ===
==== Democratic ====
Cook County Board of Commissioners 7th district Democratic primary
Party	Candidate	Votes	%
Democratic	Joseph Mario Moreno (incumbent)	13,320	69.87
Democratic	Albert Martinez	2,894	15.17
Democratic	Leonard "Len" Dominguez	2,867	15.03
Total votes		19,081	100

==== Republican ====
No candidates, ballot-certified or formal write-in, ran in the Republican primary.

=== General election ===
Cook County Board of Commissioners 7th district election
Party	Candidate	Votes	%
Democratic	Joseph Mario Moreno (incumbent)	29,779	100
Total votes		29,779	100

== 8th district ==
Incumbent third-term Commissioner Roberto Maldonado, a Democrat, was reelected.

=== Primaries ===
==== Democratic ====
Cook County Board of Commissioners 8th district Democratic primary
Party	Candidate	Votes	%
Democratic	Roberto Maldonado (incumbent)	18,409	100
Total votes		18,409	100

==== Republican ====
No candidates, ballot-certified or formal write-in, ran in the Republican primary.

=== General election ===
Cook County Board of Commissioners 8th district election
Party	Candidate	Votes	%
Democratic	Roberto Maldonado (incumbent)	38,795	100
Total votes		38,795	100

== 9th district ==
Incumbent third-term Commissioner Peter N. Silvestri, a Republican, was reelected.

=== Primaries ===
==== Democratic ====
Cook County Board of Commissioners 9th district Democratic primary
Party	Candidate	Votes	%
Democratic	Jodi L. Biancalana	16,485	58.41
Democratic	Bruce Best	11,738	41.59
Total votes		28,223	100

==== Republican ====
Cook County Board of Commissioners 9th district Republican primary
Party	Candidate	Votes	%
Republican	Peter N. Silvestri (incumbent)	11,474	85.48
Republican	Daniel S. Kollman	1,949	14.52
Total votes		13,423	100

=== General election ===
Cook County Board of Commissioners 9th district election
Party	Candidate	Votes	%
Republican	Peter N. Silvestri (incumbent)	47,881	56.61
Democratic	Jodi L. Biancalana	36,701	43.39
Total votes		84,582	100

== 10th district ==
Incumbent second-term Commissioner Mike Quigley, a Democrat, was reelected, running unopposed in both the Democratic primary and general election.

=== Primaries ===
==== Democratic ====
Cook County Board of Commissioners 10th district Democratic primary
Party	Candidate	Votes	%
Democratic	Mike Quigley (incumbent)	26,207	100
Total votes		26,207	100

==== Republican ====
No candidates, ballot-certified or formal write-in, ran in the Republican primary.

=== General election ===
Cook County Board of Commissioners 10th district election
Party	Candidate	Votes	%
Democratic	Mike Quigley (incumbent)	62,905	100
Total votes		62,905	100

== 11th district ==
Incumbent Commissioner John P. Daley, a Democrat in office since 1992, was reelected.

=== Primaries ===
==== Democratic ====
Cook County Board of Commissioners 11th district Democratic primary
Party	Candidate	Votes	%
Democratic	John P. Daley (incumbent)	45,864	100
Total votes		45,864	100

==== Republican ====
Cook County Board of Commissioners 11th district Republican primary
Party	Candidate	Votes	%
Republican	Carl Segvich	4,046	100
Total votes		4,046	100

=== General election ===
Cook County Board of Commissioners 11th district election
Party	Candidate	Votes	%
Democratic	John P. Daley (incumbent)	65,846	79.49
Republican	Carl Segvich	16,986	20.51
Total votes		82,832	100

== 12th district ==
Incumbent first-term Commissioner Forrest Claypool, a Democrat, was reelected.

=== Primaries ===
==== Democratic ====
Cook County Board of Commissioners 12th district Democratic primary
Party	Candidate	Votes	%
Democratic	Forrest Claypool (incumbent)	26,567	100
Total votes		26,567	100

==== Republican ====
No candidates, ballot-certified or formal write-in, ran in the Republican primary.

=== General election ===
Cook County Board of Commissioners 12th district election
Party	Candidate	Votes	%
Democratic	Forrest Claypool (incumbent)	57,709	100
Total votes		57,709	100

== 13th district ==
Incumbent first-term Commissioner Larry Suffredin, a Democrat, was reelected, running unopposed in both the Democratic primary and general election.

=== Primaries ===
==== Democratic ====
Cook County Board of Commissioners 13th district Democratic primary
Party	Candidate	Votes	%
Democratic	Larry Suffredin (incumbent)	28,280	
Total votes		28,280	100

==== Republican ====
No candidates, ballot-certified or formal write-in, ran in the Republican primary.

=== General election ===
Cook County Board of Commissioners 13th district election
Party	Candidate	Votes	%
Democratic	Larry Suffredin (incumbent)	71,801	100
Total votes		71,801	100

== 14th district ==
Incumbent second-term Commissioner Gregg Goslin, a Republican, was reelected.

=== Primaries ===
==== Democratic ====
No candidates, ballot-certified or formal write-in, ran in the Democratic primary. The Democratic Party ultimately nominated Michelene "Mickie" Polk.

==== Republican ====
Cook County Board of Commissioners 14th district Republican primary
Party	Candidate	Votes	%
Republican	Gregg Goslin (incumbent)	17,523	100
Total votes		17,523	100

=== General election ===
Cook County Board of Commissioners 14th district election
Party	Candidate	Votes	%
Republican	Gregg Goslin (incumbent)	49,400	53.80
Democratic	Michelene "Mickie" Polk	42,426	46.20
Total votes		91,826	100

== 15th district ==
Incumbent eighth-term Commissioner Carl Hansen, a Republican, sought reelection, but was defeated in the Republican primary by Tim Schneider, who went on to win the general election.

=== Primaries ===
==== Democratic ====
Cook County Board of Commissioners 15th district Democratic primary
Party	Candidate	Votes	%
Democratic	Jim Steven Dasakis	10,345	100
Total votes		10,345	100

==== Republican ====
Cook County Board of Commissioners 15th district Republican primary
Party	Candidate	Votes	%
Republican	Timothy O. Schneider	7,293	51.08
Republican	Carl R. Hansen (incumbent)	6,984	48.92
Total votes		14,277	100

=== General election ===
Cook County Board of Commissioners 15th district election
Party	Candidate	Votes	%
Republican	Timothy O. Schneider	35,696	52.67
Democratic	Jim Steven Dasakis	32,075	47.33
Total votes		67,771	100

== 16th district ==
Incumbent first-term Commissioner Tony Peraica, a Republican, was reelected.

=== Primaries ===
==== Democratic ====
Cook County Board of Commissioners 16th district Democratic primary
Party	Candidate	Votes	%
Democratic	William Edward Gomolinski	17,570	100
Total votes		17,570	100

==== Republican ====
Cook County Board of Commissioners 16th district Republican primary
Party	Candidate	Votes	%
Republican	Tony Peraica (incumbent)	12,035	100
Total votes		12,035	100

=== General election ===
Cook County Board of Commissioners 16th district election
Party	Candidate	Votes	%
Republican	Tony Peraica (incumbent)	35,605	51.04
Democratic	William Edward Gomolinski	34,154	48.96
Total votes		69,759	100

== 17th district ==
Incumbent first-term Commissioner Elizabeth Ann Doody Gorman, a Republican, was reelected.

=== Primaries ===
==== Democratic ====
Cook County Board of Commissioners 17th district Democratic primary
Party	Candidate	Votes	%
Democratic	Thomas "Tommy" Kraus	18,900	100
Total votes		18,900	100

==== Republican ====
Cook County Board of Commissioners 17th district Republican primary
Party	Candidate	Votes	%
Republican	Elizabeth "Liz" Doody Gorman (incumbent)	12,035	100
Total votes		12,035	100

=== General election ===
Cook County Board of Commissioners 17th district election
Party	Candidate	Votes	%
Republican	Elizabeth "Liz" Doody Gorman (incumbent)	49,425	55.60
Democratic	Thomas "Tommy" Kraus	39,473	44.40
Total votes		88,898	100

== Summarizing statistics ==
Contest summary
Party	Seats held before	Nominees	Seats won
Democratic	12	17	12
Republican	5	10	5
Green	0	1	0
Total	—N/a	28	—N/a

Contests by parties contesting
Parties contesting	Total	Democratic wins	Republicans wins
Seats contested by Democratic and Republican nominees	10	5	5
Seats contested by Democratic and Green nominees	1	1	—N/a
Seats contested only by Democratic nominees	6	6	—N/a
Total	17	12	5

Vote summary
Party	Popular vote	Seats won
Democratic	924,939 (76.45%)	12
Republican	276,925 (22.89%)	5
Green	7,996 (0.66%)	0
Total	1,209,860	—N/a

Fate of incumbents
Party	Total incumbents	Incumbents that sought reelection/retired	Incumbents that won/lost re-nomination in primaries	Incumbents that won/lost general election
Democratic	12	12 sought reelection 0 retired	12 won re-nomination 0 lost re-nomination	11 won 0 lost 1 withdrew
Republican	5	5 sought reelection 0 retired	4 won re-nomination 1 lost re-nomination	4 won 0 lost
Green	No Green incumbents			
Total	17	17 sought re-election 0 retired	16 won re-nomination 1 lost re-nomination	14 won 0 lost 1 withdrew

Composition of elected board (returning/newly elected members)
Party	Returning members	Newly elected members	Total members
Democratic	11	1	12
Republican	4	1	5
Total	15	2	17
