= 2010 Cook County Board of Commissioners election =

- November 2, 2010

All 17 seats on the Cook County Board of Commissioners 9 seats needed for a majority
	First party	Second party	Third party
Party	Democratic	Republican	Green
Seats before	12	5	0
Seats won	13	4	0
Seat change	▲1	▼1	Steady
Popular vote	875,019	356,573	68,644
Percentage	67.30%	27.42%	5.28%
Swing	▼9.15%	▲4.53%	▲4.62%
- Results: Democratic gain Democratic hold Republican hold Vote Share: 50–60% 60–70% 70–80% 80–90% >90% 50–60% 60–70%

The 2010 Cook County Board of Commissioners election was held on November 2, 2010. It was preceded by a primary election held on February 5, 2010. It coincided with other 2010 Cook County, Illinois, elections (including the election for president of the Cook County Board of Commissioners). It saw all seventeen seats of the Cook County Board of Commissioners up for election to four-year terms.

The Democratic Party ran candidates in races for all seventeen seats, while the Republican Party contested eleven seats. The Green Party contested ten races (an increase from the single seat they contested in 2006). Democrats increased their majority, flipping a control of a previously-Republican seat. However, Democrats also saw a more than 9-point decline in their share of the cumulative popular vote: with Republicans and Greens each seeing a more than 4.5-point increase.

As of 2026, this remains the most recent instance in which a third party received more than 5% and the most recent instance that the Democratic Party received less than 70% of the overall popular vote. It is also the most recent instance in which the Green Party nominated candidates for the Cook County Board of Commissioners.

== Background ==
The previous elections to the board had been held in 2006. The 2006 elections had been a wave election for Democrats nationally. The 2010 elections, by contrast, were a wave election for the Republicans nationally, with impacts of that wave seen in Illinois elections.

== 1st district ==
Incumbent third-term Commissioner Earlean Collins, a Democrat, was reelected.

=== Primaries ===
==== Democratic ====
Cook County Board of Commissioners 1st district Democratic primary
Party	Candidate	Votes	%
Democratic	Earlean Collins (incumbent)	16,909	47.41
Democratic	Adekunle "Ade" B. Onayemi	10,599	29.71
Democratic	Derrick Smith	5,370	15.06
Democratic	Chris Harris	2,791	7.82
Total votes		35,669	100

==== Republican ====
No candidates, ballot-certified or formal write-in, ran in the Republican primary.

==== Green ====
Cook County Board of Commissioners 1st district Green primary
Party	Candidate	Votes	%
Green	Ronald Lawless	96	100
Total votes		96	100

=== General election ===
Cook County Board of Commissioners 1st district election
Party	Candidate	Votes	%
Democratic	Earlean Collins (incumbent)	68,890	86.13
Green	Ronald Lawless	11,095	13.87
Total votes		79,985	100

== 2nd district ==
Incumbent first-term commissioner Robert Steele, a Democrat, was reelected.

=== Primaries ===
==== Democratic ====
Cook County Board of Commissioners 2nd district Democratic primary
Party	Candidate	Votes	%
Democratic	Robert B. Steele (incumbent)	15,777	56.71
Democratic	Desiree Grode	7,852	28.23
Democratic	Frank M. Bass	3,461	12.44
Democratic	Erold Elysee	729	2.62
Total votes		27,819	100

==== Republican ====
No candidates, ballot-certified or formal write-in, ran in the Republican primary.

==== Green ====
Cook County Board of Commissioners 2nd district Green primary
Party	Candidate	Votes	%
Green	Michael Smith	82	100
Total votes		82	100

=== General election ===
Cook County Board of Commissioners 2nd district election
Party	Candidate	Votes	%
Democratic	Robert B. Steele (incumbent)	61,499	87.53
Green	Michael Smith	8,761	12.47
Total votes		70,260	100

== 3rd district ==
Incumbent Commissioner Jerry Butler, a Democrat who first assumed the office in 1985, was reelected.

=== Primaries ===
==== Democratic ====
Cook County Board of Commissioners 3rd district Democratic primary
Party	Candidate	Votes	%
Democratic	Jerry "Iceman" Butler (incumbent)	33,128	74.43
Democratic	Monica Torres-Linares	8,216	18.46
Democratic	Ronald Oliver	3,163	7.11
Total votes		44,507	100

==== Republican ====
No candidates, ballot-certified or formal write-in, ran in the Republican primary.

==== Green ====
No candidates, ballot-certified or formal write-in, ran in the Green primary. The Green Party ultimately nominated Marie J. "Jenny" Wohadlo.

=== General election ===
Cook County Board of Commissioners 3rd district election
Party	Candidate	Votes	%
Democratic	Jerry "Iceman" Butler (incumbent)	78,106	88.84
Green	Marie J. "Jenny" Wohadlo	9,809	11.16
Total votes		87,915	100

== 4th district ==
Incumbent first-term Commissioner William Beavers, a Democrat, was reelected.

=== Primaries ===
==== Democratic ====
Cook County Board of Commissioners 4th district Democratic primary
Party	Candidate	Votes	%
Democratic	William Beavers (incumbent)	26,025	55.32
Democratic	Elgie R. Sims, Jr.	21,016	44.68
Total votes		47,041	100

==== Republican ====
No candidates, ballot-certified or formal write-in, ran in the Republican primary.

==== Green ====
Cook County Board of Commissioners 4th district Green primary
Party	Candidate	Votes	%
Green	Joseph A. Barton	88	100
Total votes		88	100

=== General election ===
Cook County Board of Commissioners 4th district election
Party	Candidate	Votes	%
Democratic	William Beavers (incumbent)	81,046	90.58
Green	Joseph A. Barton	8,431	9.42
Total votes		89,477	100

== 5th district ==
Incumbent fourth-term Commissioner Deborah Sims, a Democrat, was reelected.

=== Primaries ===
==== Democratic ====
Cook County Board of Commissioners 5th district Democratic primary
Party	Candidate	Votes	%
Democratic	Deborah Sims (incumbent)	29,923	74.96
Democratic	Sheila Y. Chalmers-Currin	9,998	25.04
Total votes		39,921	100

==== Republican ====
Cook County Board of Commissioners 5th district Republican primary
Party	Candidate	Votes	%
Republican	Miriam Shabo	1,170	51.98
Republican	James Thigpen	1,081	48.02
Total votes		2,251	100

==== Green ====
No candidates, ballot-certified or formal write-in, ran in the Green primary.

=== General election ===
Cook County Board of Commissioners 5th district election
Party	Candidate	Votes	%
Democratic	Deborah Sims (incumbent)	79,566	90.38
Republican	Miriam Shabo	8,471	9.62
Total votes		88,037	100

== 6th district ==
Incumbent second-term Commissioner Joan Patricia Murphy, a Democrat, was reelected.

=== Primaries ===
==== Democratic ====
Cook County Board of Commissioners 6th district Democratic primary
Party	Candidate	Votes	%
Democratic	Joan Patricia Murphy (incumbent)	16,449	53.69
Democratic	Nick Valadez	9,248	30.19
Democratic	John Fairman	4,939	16.12
Total votes		30,636	100

==== Republican ====
Sandra Czyznikiewicz defeated former 6th district Commissioner William Moran and Michael Hawkins in the Republican primary.

Cook County Board of Commissioners 6th district Democratic primary
Party	Candidate	Votes	%
Republican	Sandra K Czyznikiewicz	4,330	46.19
Republican	William R. Moran	3,062	32.66
Republican	Michael Hawkins	1,982	21.14
Total votes		9,374	100

==== Green ====
No candidates, ballot-certified or formal write-in, ran in the Green primary.

=== General election ===
Cook County Board of Commissioners 6th district election
Party	Candidate	Votes	%
Democratic	Joan Patricia Murphy (incumbent)	54,227	65.37
Republican	Sandra K Czyznikiewicz	28,727	34.63
Total votes		82,954	100

== 7th district ==
Incumbent fifth-term Commissioner Joseph Mario Moreno, a Democrat, lost reelection, being unseated in the Democratic primary by Jesús "Chuy" García, who went on to win the general election.

=== Primaries ===
==== Democratic ====
Cook County Board of Commissioners 7th district Democratic primary
Party	Candidate	Votes	%
Democratic	Jesus G. Garcia	9,651	54.68
Democratic	Joseph Mario Moreno (incumbent)	8,000	45.32
Total votes		17,651	100

==== Republican ====
No candidates, ballot-certified or formal write-in, ran in the Republican primary.

==== Green ====
Cook County Board of Commissioners 7th district Green primary
Party	Candidate	Votes	%
Green	Paloma Andrade	102	100
Total votes		102	100

=== General election ===
Cook County Board of Commissioners 7th district election
Party	Candidate	Votes	%
Democratic	Jesus G. Garcia	24,820	86.26
Green	Paloma Andrade	3,952	13.74
Total votes		28,772	100

== 8th district ==
Incumbent Commissioner Edwin Reyes, a Democrat, who been appointed in 2009 after Roberto Maldonado resigned to serve a Chicago alderman, was elected to a full term.

=== Primaries ===
==== Democratic ====
Cook County Board of Commissioners 8th district Democratic primary
Party	Candidate	Votes	%
Democratic	Edwin Reyes (incumbent)	9,256	51.21
Democratic	Javier "Xavier" Nogueras	6,075	33.61
Democratic	Ariel Rosa	2,742	15.17
Total votes		18,073	100

==== Republican ====
No candidates, ballot-certified or formal write-in, ran in the Republican primary.

==== Green ====
No candidates, ballot-certified or formal write-in, ran in the Green primary.

=== General election ===
Cook County Board of Commissioners 8th district election
Party	Candidate	Votes	%
Democratic	Edwin Reyes (incumbent)	37,147	100
Total votes		37,147	100

== 9th district ==
Incumbent fourth-term Commissioner Peter N. Silvestri, a Republican, was reelected.

=== Primaries ===
==== Democratic ====
Cook County Board of Commissioners 9th district Democratic primary
Party	Candidate	Votes	%
Democratic	Cary Capparelli	24,898	100
Total votes		24,898	100

==== Republican ====
Cook County Board of Commissioners 9th district Republican primary
Party	Candidate	Votes	%
Republican	Peter N. Silvestri (incumbent)	13,196	100
Total votes		13,196	100

==== Green ====
Cook County Board of Commissioners 9th district Green primary
Party	Candidate	Votes	%
Green	Brock Merck	151	100
Total votes		151	100

=== General election ===
Cook County Board of Commissioners 9th district election
Party	Candidate	Votes	%
Republican	Peter N. Silvestri (incumbent)	47,333	55.29
Democratic	Cary Capparelli	31,186	36.43
Green	Brock Merck	7,084	8.28
Total votes		85,603	100

== 10th district ==
Incumbent Commissioner Bridget Gainer, a Democrat first appointed in 2009 (to fill the vacancy left after Mike Quigley resigned to assume office as the United States congressman), was elected to a full term.

=== Primaries ===
==== Democratic ====
Cook County Board of Commissioners 10th district Democratic primary
Party	Candidate	Votes	%
Democratic	Bridget Gainer (incumbent)	24,957	100
Total votes		24,957	100

==== Republican ====
No candidates, ballot-certified or formal write-in, ran in the Republican primary. The Republican Party ultimately nominated Wes Fowler.

==== Green ====
No candidates, ballot-certified or formal write-in, ran in the Republican primary.

=== General election ===
Cook County Board of Commissioners 10th district election
Party	Candidate	Votes	%
Democratic	Bridget Gainer (incumbent)	56,723	74.65
Republican	Wes Fowler	19,264	25.35
Total votes		75,987	100

== 11th district ==
Incumbent Commissioner John P. Daley, a Democrat in office since 1992, was reelected.

=== Primaries ===
==== Democratic ====
Cook County Board of Commissioners 11th district Democratic primary
Party	Candidate	Votes	%
Democratic	John P. Daley (incumbent)	37,222	100
Total votes		37,222	100

==== Republican ====
Cook County Board of Commissioners 11th district Republican primary
Party	Candidate	Votes	%
Republican	Carl Segvich	5,519	100
Total votes		5,519	100

==== Green ====
No candidates, ballot-certified or formal write-in, ran in the Republican primary.

=== General election ===
Cook County Board of Commissioners 11th district election
Party	Candidate	Votes	%
Democratic	John P. Daley (incumbent)	56,711	69.97
Republican	Carl Segvich	24,340	30.03
Total votes		81,051	100

== 12th district ==
Incumbent second-term Commissioner Forrest Claypool, a Democrat, did not seek reelection. John Fritchey was elected to succeed him.

=== Primaries ===
==== Democratic ====
Cook County Board of Commissioners 12th district Democratic primary
Party	Candidate	Votes	%
Democratic	John A. Fritchey	19,878	75.32
Democratic	Ted Matlak	6,512	24.68
Total votes		26,390	100

==== Republican ====
No candidates, ballot-certified or formal write-in, ran in the Republican primary. The Republican Party ultimately nominated William C. "Bill" Miceli.

==== Green ====
No candidates, ballot-certified or formal write-in, ran in the Green primary.

=== General election ===
Cook County Board of Commissioners 12th district election
Party	Candidate	Votes	%
Democratic	John A. Fritchey	50,219	74.72
Republican	William C. "Bill" Miceli	16,987	25.28
Total votes		67,206	100

== 13th district ==
Incumbent second-term Commissioner Larry Suffredin, a Democrat, was reelected.

=== Primaries ===
==== Democratic ====
Cook County Board of Commissioners 13th district Democratic primary
Party	Candidate	Votes	%
Democratic	Larry Suffredin (incumbent)	28,751	78.21
Democratic	John Michael Keefe	8,012	21.79
Total votes		36,763	100

==== Republican ====
Cook County Board of Commissioners 13th district Republican primary
Party	Candidate	Votes	%
Republican	Linda Thompson LaFianza	9,866	100
Total votes		9,866	100

==== Green ====
Cook County Board of Commissioners 13th district Green primary
Party	Candidate	Votes	%
Green	George E. Milkowski	165	100
Total votes		165	100

=== General election ===
Cook County Board of Commissioners 13th district election
Party	Candidate	Votes	%
Democratic	Larry Suffredin (incumbent)	62,562	67.71
Republican	Linda Thompson LaFianza	24,597	26.62
Green	George E. Milkowski	5,241	5.67
Total votes		92,400	100

== 14th district ==
Incumbent third-term Commissioner Gregg Goslin, a Republican, was reelected.

=== Primaries ===
==== Democratic ====
Cook County Board of Commissioners 14th district Democratic primary
Party	Candidate	Votes	%
Democratic	Jennifer Bishop Jenkins	17,605	100
Total votes		17,605	100

==== Republican ====
Cook County Board of Commissioners 14th district Republican primary
Party	Candidate	Votes	%
Republican	Gregg Goslin (incumbent)	15,583	63.82
Republican	Patrick O'Donoghue	8,836	36.18
Total votes		24,419	100

==== Green ====
No candidates, ballot-certified or formal write-in, ran in the Green primary.

=== General election ===
Cook County Board of Commissioners 14th district election
Party	Candidate	Votes	%
Republican	Gregg Goslin (incumbent)	60,664	61.89
Democratic	Jennifer Bishop Jenkins	37,357	38.11
Total votes		98,021	100

== 15th district ==
Incumbent first-term Commissioner Tim Schneider, a Republican, was reelected.

=== Primaries ===
==== Democratic ====
Cook County Board of Commissioners 15th district Democratic primary
Party	Candidate	Votes	%
Democratic	Jim Steven Dasakis	12,629	100
Total votes		12,629	100

==== Republican ====
Cook County Board of Commissioners 15th district Republican primary
Party	Candidate	Votes	%
Republican	Timothy O. Schneider (incumbent)	13,405	100
Total votes		13,405	100

==== Green ====
No candidates, ballot-certified or formal write-in, ran in the Green primary. The Green Party ultimately nominated Laura Ehorn.

=== General election ===
Cook County Board of Commissioners 15th district election
Party	Candidate	Votes	%
Republican	Timothy O. Schneider (incumbent)	41,106	57.55
Democratic	Jim Steven Dasakis	25,976	36.37
Green	Lara Ehorn	4,342	6.08
Total votes		71,424	100

== 16th district ==
Incumbent second-term Commissioner Tony Peraica, a Republican, lost reelection to Democrat Jeff Tobolski.

=== Primaries ===
==== Democratic ====
Cook County Board of Commissioners 16th district Democratic primary
Party	Candidate	Votes	%
Democratic	Jeff Tobolski	10,635	54.88
Democratic	Eddy Garcia	4,262	21.99
Democratic	Bill Russ	4,482	23.13
Total votes		19,379	100

==== Republican ====
Cook County Board of Commissioners 16th district Republican primary
Party	Candidate	Votes	%
Republican	Tony Peraica (incumbent)	9,290	75.07
Republican	Brian A. Sloan	3,085	24.93
Total votes		12,375	100

=== Green ===
Cook County Board of Commissioners 16th district Green primary
Party	Candidate	Votes	%
Green	Alejandro Reyes	65	59.63
Green	Alex Matos	44	40.37
Total votes		109	100

=== General election ===
Cook County Board of Commissioners 16th district election
Party	Candidate	Votes	%
Democratic	Jeff Tobolski	34,298	50.67
Republican	Tony Peraica (incumbent)	28,661	42.34
Green	Alejandro Reyes	4,735	6.99
Total votes		67,694	100

== 17th district ==
Incumbent second-term Commissioner Elizabeth Ann Doody Gorman, a Republican, was reelected.

=== Primaries ===
==== Democratic ====
Cook County Board of Commissioners 17th district Democratic primary
Party	Candidate	Votes	%
Democratic	Patrick Maher	12,535	52.05
Democratic	Victor A. Forys	6,360	26.41
Democratic	Donna Sanders	5,187	21.54
Total votes		24,082	100

==== Republican ====
Cook County Board of Commissioners 17th district Republican primary
Party	Candidate	Votes	%
Republican	Elizabeth "Liz" Doody Gorman (incumbent)	11,955	56.18
Republican	Mark Thompson	9,323	43.82
Total votes		21,278	100

=== Green ===
Cook County Board of Commissioners 17th district Green primary
Party	Candidate	Votes	%
Green	Matthew J. Ogean	57	52.78
Green	Richard Dalka	51	47.22
Total votes		108	100

=== General election ===
Cook County Board of Commissioners 17th district election
Party	Candidate	Votes	%
Republican	Elizabeth "Liz" Doody Gorman (incumbent)	56,423	58.59
Democratic	Patrick Maher	34,686	36.02
Green	Matthew J. Ogean	5,194	5.39
Total votes		96,303	100

== Summarizing statistics ==
Contest summary
Party	Seats held before	Nominees	Seats won
Democratic	12	17	13
Republican	5	11	4
Green	0	10	0
Total	—N/a	38	—N/a

Contests by parties contesting
Parties contesting	Total	Democratic wins	Republicans wins
Seats contested by Democratic, Republican, and Green nominees	5	2	3
Seats contested by Democratic and Republican nominees (no Green)	6	5	1
Seats contested by Democratic and Green nominees (no Republican)	5	5	—N/a
Seats contested only by Democratic nominees	1	1	—N/a
Total	17	13	4

Vote summary
Party	Popular vote	Seats won
Democratic	875,019 (67.30%)	13
Republican	356,573 (27.42%)	4
Green	68,644 (5.28%)	0
Total	1,300,236	—N/a

Fate of incumbents
Party	Total incumbents	Incumbents that sought reelection/retired	Incumbents that won/lost re-nomination in primaries	Incumbents that won/lost general election
Democratic	12	11 sought reelection 1 retired	10 won re-nomination 1 lost re-nomination	10 won 0 lost
Republican	5	5 sought reelection 0 retired	5 won re-nomination 0 lost re-nomination	4 won 1 lost
Green	No Green incumbents			
Total	17	16 sought reelection 1 retired	15 won re-nomination 1 lost re-nomination	14 won 1 lost

Composition of elected board (returning/newly elected members)
Party	Returning members	Newly elected members	Total members
Democratic	10	3	13
Republican	4	0	4
Total	14	3	17
