= 1998 Cook County Board of Commissioners election =

- November 3, 1998

All 17 seats on the Cook County Board of Commissioners 9 seats needed for a majority
| | First party | Second party |
|---|---|---|
| Party | Democratic | Republican |
| Seats before | 11 | 6 |
| Seats won | 12 | 5 |
| Seat change | ▲1 | ▼1 |
| Popular vote | 791,445 | 332,957 |
| Percentage | 70.39% | 29.61% |

The 1998 Cook County Board of Commissioners election was held on November 3, 1998. It was preceded by a primary election held on March 17, 1998. It coincided with other 1998 Cook County, Illinois, elections (including the election for president of the Cook County Board of Commissioners). It saw all seventeen seats of the Cook County Board of Commissioners up for election to four-year terms.

== 1st district ==
Incumbent commissioner Darlena Williams-Burnett, a Democrat appointed in 1997 after fellow Democrat Danny K. Davis resigned to serve in the United States House of Representatives, lost renomination in the Democratic primary to Earlean Collins. Collins would go on to win the general election.

=== Primaries ===
==== Democratic ====
Cook County Board of Commissioners 1st district Democratic primary
| Party | Candidate | Votes | % |
|---|---|---|---|
| Democratic | Earlean Collins | 15,001 | 45.26 |
| Democratic | Darlena Williams-Burnett (incumbent) | 11,968 | 36.11 |
| Democratic | Lori L. Jordan | 3,271 | 9.87 |
| Democratic | Brenetta Howell Barrett | 2,901 | 8.75 |
| Total votes | | 33,141 | 100 |

==== Republican ====
Cook County Board of Commissioners 1st district Republican primary
| Party | Candidate | Votes | % |
|---|---|---|---|
| Republican | Luther Franklin Spence | 1,583 | 100 |
| Total votes | | 1,583 | 100 |

=== General election ===
Cook County Board of Commissioners 1st district election
| Party | Candidate | Votes | % |
|---|---|---|---|
| Democratic | Earlean Collins | 62,134 | 88.80 |
| Republican | Luther Franklin Spence | 7,835 | 11.20 |
| Total votes | | 69,969 | 100 |

== 2nd district ==
Incumbent third-term commissioner Bobbie L. Steele, a Democrat, was reelected, running unopposed in both the primary and general election.

=== Primaries ===
==== Democratic ====
Cook County Board of Commissioners 2nd district Democratic primary
| Party | Candidate | Votes | % |
|---|---|---|---|
| Democratic | Bobbie L. Steele (incumbent) | 26,141 | 100 |
| Total votes | | 26,141 | 100 |

==== Republican ====
No candidates ran in the Republican primary.

=== General election ===
Cook County Board of Commissioners 2nd district election
| Party | Candidate | Votes | % |
|---|---|---|---|
| Democratic | Bobbie L. Steele (incumbent) | 61,487 | 100 |
| Total votes | | 61,487 | 100 |

== 3rd district ==
Incumbent commissioner Jerry Butler, a Democrat who first assumed office in 1985, was reelected.

=== Primaries ===
==== Democratic ====
Cook County Board of Commissioners 3rd district Democratic primary
| Party | Candidate | Votes | % |
|---|---|---|---|
| Democratic | Jerry "Iceman" Butler (incumbent) | 38,266 | 100 |
| Total votes | | 38,266 | 100 |

==== Republican ====
Cook County Board of Commissioners 3rd district Republican primary
| Party | Candidate | Votes | % |
|---|---|---|---|
| Republican | Nathan Peoples | 1,385 | 100 |
| Total votes | | 1,385 | 100 |

=== General election ===
Cook County Board of Commissioners 3rd district election
| Party | Candidate | Votes | % |
|---|---|---|---|
| Democratic | Jerry "Iceman" Butler (incumbent) | 72,279 | 91.25 |
| Republican | Nathan Peoples | 6,928 | 8.75 |
| Total votes | | 79,207 | 100 |

== 4th district ==
Incumbent commissioner John Stroger, a Democrat, was reelected, running unopposed in both the Democratic primary and general election.

=== Primaries ===
==== Democratic ====
Cook County Board of Commissioners 4th district Democratic primary
| Party | Candidate | Votes | % |
|---|---|---|---|
| Democratic | John H. Stroger, Jr. (incumbent) | 51,551 | 100 |
| Total votes | | 51,551 | 100 |

==== Republican ====
No candidates ran in the Republican primary.

=== General election ===
Cook County Board of Commissioners 4th district election
| Party | Candidate | Votes | % |
|---|---|---|---|
| Democratic | John H. Stroger, Jr. (incumbent) | 91,847 | 100 |
| Total votes | | 91,847 | 100 |

== 5th district ==
Incumbent first-term commissioner Deborah Sims, a Democrat, was reelected.

=== Primaries ===
==== Democratic ====
Cook County Board of Commissioners 5th district Democratic primary
| Party | Candidate | Votes | % |
|---|---|---|---|
| Democratic | Deborah Sims (incumbent) | 20,457 | 55.04 |
| Democratic | William "Bill" Lockhart | 16,711 | 44.96 |
| Total votes | | 37,168 | 100 |

==== Republican ====
No candidates ran in the Republican primary.

=== General election ===
Cook County Board of Commissioners 5th district election
| Party | Candidate | Votes | % |
|---|---|---|---|
| Democratic | Deborah Sims (incumbent) | 75,008 | 100 |
| Total votes | | 75,008 | 100 |

== 6th district ==
Incumbent first-term commissioner Bud Fleming, a Republican, unsuccessfully sought reelection, being unseated by Democratic nominee William Moran. Moran's victory of Flemming was considered an upset victory. Before winning this race, Moran had been regarded as a perennial candidate.

=== Primaries ===
==== Democratic ====
William Moran, who had never held office, defeated John David Desimone, who had served as President of the Chicago Heights Park District since 1995.

Cook County Board of Commissioners 6th district Democratic primary
| Party | Candidate | Votes | % |
|---|---|---|---|
| Democratic | William Moran | 10,089 | 58.26 |
| Democratic | John David Desimone | 7,229 | 41.74 |
| Total votes | | 17,318 | 100 |

==== Republican ====
Cook County Board of Commissioners 6th district Republican primary
| Party | Candidate | Votes | % |
|---|---|---|---|
| Republican | Barclav "Bud" Fleming (incumbent) | 7,670 | 51.21 |
| Republican | Cindy Panayotovich | 7,309 | 48.79 |
| Total votes | | 14,979 | 100 |

=== General election ===
Cook County Board of Commissioners 6th district election
| Party | Candidate | Votes | % |
|---|---|---|---|
| Democratic | William Moran | 36,771 | 50.40 |
| Republican | Barclav "Bud" Fleming (incumbent) | 36,186 | 49.60 |
| Total votes | | 72,957 | 100 |

== 7th district ==
Incumbent first-term commissioner Joseph Mario Moreno, a Democrat, was reelected.

=== Primaries ===
==== Democratic ====
Cook County Board of Commissioners 7th district Democratic primary
| Party | Candidate | Votes | % |
|---|---|---|---|
| Democratic | Joseph Mario Moreno (incumbent) | 15,120 | 100 |
| Total votes | | 15,120 | 100 |

==== Republican ====
Cook County Board of Commissioners 7th district Republican primary
| Party | Candidate | Votes | % |
|---|---|---|---|
| Republican | Irma C. Lopez | 1,156 | 100 |
| Total votes | | 1,156 | 100 |

=== General election ===
Republican primary winner Irma C. Lopez was replaced on the ballot by Alberto Alva.

Cook County Board of Commissioners 7th district election
| Party | Candidate | Votes | % |
|---|---|---|---|
| Democratic | Joseph Mario Moreno (incumbent) | 25,587 | 84.27 |
| Republican | Alberto Alva | 4,962 | 15.73 |
| Total votes | | 30,549 | 100 |

== 8th district ==
Incumbent first-term commissioner Roberto Maldonado, a Democrat, was reelected, running unopposed in both the primary and general election.

=== Primaries ===
==== Democratic ====
Incumbent Roberto Maldono was challenged by Francisco Duprey, who had served as the director of school services for Chicago Public Schools and had also led Chicago's Department of Economic Development.

Cook County Board of Commissioners 8th district Democratic primary
| Party | Candidate | Votes | % |
|---|---|---|---|
| Democratic | Roberto Maldonado (incumbent) | 12,619 | 64.97 |
| Democratic | Francisco Duprey | 6,803 | 35.03 |
| Total votes | | 19,422 | 100 |

==== Republican ====
No candidates ran in the Republican primary.

=== General election ===
Cook County Board of Commissioners 8th district election
| Party | Candidate | Votes | % |
|---|---|---|---|
| Democratic | Roberto Maldonado (incumbent) | 31,356 | 100 |
| Total votes | | 31,356 | 100 |

== 9th district ==
Incumbent first-term commissioner Peter N. Silvestri, a Republican, was reelected.

=== Primaries ===
==== Democratic ====
Cook County Board of Commissioners 9th district Democratic primary
| Party | Candidate | Votes | % |
|---|---|---|---|
| Democratic | Joan A. Sullivan | 17,569 | 63.66 |
| Democratic | Frank Nino | 10,029 | 36.34 |
| Total votes | | 27,598 | 100 |

==== Republican ====
Cook County Board of Commissioners 9th district Republican primary
| Party | Candidate | Votes | % |
|---|---|---|---|
| Republican | Peter N. Silvestri (incumbent) | 8,534 | 100 |
| Total votes | | 8,534 | 100 |

=== General election ===
Cook County Board of Commissioners 9th district election
| Party | Candidate | Votes | % |
|---|---|---|---|
| Republican | Peter N. Silvestri (incumbent) | 47,720 | 55.76 |
| Democratic | Joan A. Sullivan | 37,854 | 44.24 |
| Total votes | | 85,574 | 100 |

== 10th district ==
Incumbent second-term commissioner Maria Pappas, a Democrat, did not seek reelection, instead opting to run for Cook County Treasurer. Democrat Mike Quigley was elected to succeed her in office.

=== Primaries ===
==== Democratic ====
Cook County Board of Commissioners 10th district Democratic primary
| Party | Candidate | Votes | % |
|---|---|---|---|
| Democratic | Mike Quigley | 11,185 | 44.78 |
| Democratic | Ralph Martire | 6,799 | 27.22 |
| Democratic | Peter Miller | 2,604 | 10.43 |
| Democratic | Brian J. Berg | 2,536 | 10.15 |
| Democratic | Stefanos "Scott" Venable | 1,854 | 7.42 |
| Total votes | | 24,978 | 100 |

==== Republican ====
No candidates ran in the Republican primary.

=== General election ===
Cook County Board of Commissioners 10th district election
| Party | Candidate | Votes | % |
|---|---|---|---|
| Democratic | Mike Quigley | 56,208 | 100 |
| Total votes | | 56,208 | 100 |

== 11th district ==
Incumbent commissioner John P. Daley, a Democrat in office since 1992, was reelected.

=== Primaries ===
==== Democratic ====
Cook County Board of Commissioners 11th district Democratic primary
| Party | Candidate | Votes | % |
|---|---|---|---|
| Democratic | John P. Daley (incumbent) | 42,616 | 100 |
| Total votes | | 42,616 | 100 |

==== Republican ====
Cook County Board of Commissioners 11th district Republican primary
| Party | Candidate | Votes | % |
|---|---|---|---|
| Republican | William Walsh | 3,541 | 100 |
| Total votes | | 3,541 | 100 |

=== General election ===
Cook County Board of Commissioners 11th district election
| Party | Candidate | Votes | % |
|---|---|---|---|
| Democratic | John P. Daley (incumbent) | 70,457 | 76.49 |
| Republican | William Walsh | 21,654 | 23.51 |
| Total votes | | 92,111 | 100 |

== 12th district ==
Incumbent third-term commissioner Ted Lechowicz, a Democrat, was reelected.

=== Primaries ===
==== Democratic ====
Cook County Board of Commissioners 12th district Democratic primary
| Party | Candidate | Votes | % |
|---|---|---|---|
| Democratic | Thaddeus "Ted" Lechowicz (incumbent) | 22,785 | 48.87 |
| Total votes | | 22,785 | 100 |

==== Republican ====
No candidates, ballot-certified or formal write-in, ran in the Republican primary.

=== General election ===
Cook County Board of Commissioners 12th district election
| Party | Candidate | Votes | % |
|---|---|---|---|
| Democratic | Thaddeus "Ted" Lechowicz (incumbent) | 47,588 | 100 |
| Total votes | | 47,588 | 100 |

== 13th district ==
Incumbent first-term Commissioner Calvin Sutker, a Democrat, was reelected.

=== Primaries ===
==== Democratic ====
Cook County Board of Commissioners 13th district Democratic primary
| Party | Candidate | Votes | % |
|---|---|---|---|
| Democratic | Calvin R. Sutker (incumbent) | 22,650 | 100 |
| Total votes | | 22,650 | 100 |

==== Republican ====
No candidates ran in the Republican primary.

=== General election ===
Cook County Board of Commissioners 13th district election
| Party | Candidate | Votes | % |
|---|---|---|---|
| Democratic | Calvin R. Sutker (incumbent) | 53,277 | 70.74 |
| Republican | Ellen R. Schrodt | 22,037 | 29.26 |
| Total votes | | 75,314 | 100 |

== 14th district ==
Incumbent commissioner Richard Siebel, a Republican, did not seek reelection. Republican Gregg Goslin was elected to succeed him.

=== Primaries ===
==== Democratic ====
No candidates ran in the Democratic primary.

==== Republican ====
Cook County Board of Commissioners 14th district Republican primary
| Party | Candidate | Votes | % |
|---|---|---|---|
| Republican | Gregg Goslin | 10,539 | 51.38 |
| Republican | Delores Stephan | 9,974 | 48.62 |
| Total votes | | 20,513 | 100 |

=== General election ===
Cook County Board of Commissioners 14th district election
| Party | Candidate | Votes | % |
|---|---|---|---|
| Republican | Gregg Goslin | 45,781 | 59.27 |
| Democratic | Joyce Thompson Fitzgerald | 31,458 | 40.73 |
| Total votes | | 77,239 | 100 |

== 15th district ==
Incumbent sixth-term commissioner Carl R. Hansen, a Republican, was reelected.

=== Primaries ===
==== Democratic ====
Cook County Board of Commissioners 15th district Democratic primary
| Party | Candidate | Votes | % |
|---|---|---|---|
| Democratic | Bridget Mary White | 3,955 | 63.24 |
| Democratic | Ronald G. Bobkowski | 2,299 | 36.76 |
| Total votes | | 11,611 | 100 |

==== Republican ====
Cook County Board of Commissioners 15th district Republican primary
| Party | Candidate | Votes | % |
|---|---|---|---|
| Republican | Carl R. Hansen (incumbent) | 8,047 | 50.72 |
| Republican | Michael S. Olszewski | 5,431 | 34.23 |
| Republican | Kenneth B. Dubinsky | 2,388 | 15.05 |
| Total votes | | 15,866 | 100 |

=== General election ===
Cook County Board of Commissioners 15th district election
| Party | Candidate | Votes | % |
|---|---|---|---|
| Republican | Carl R. Hansen (incumbent) | 35,681 | 61.00 |
| Democratic | Bridget Mary White | 22,810 | 39.00 |
| Total votes | | 58,491 | 100 |

== 16th district ==
Incumbent Commissioner Allan C. Carr, a Republican, was reelected.

=== Primaries ===
==== Democratic ====
Cook County Board of Commissioners 16th district Democratic primary
| Party | Candidate | Votes | % |
|---|---|---|---|
| Democratic | John E. Bertone | 9,970 | 100 |
| Total votes | | 9,970 | 100 |

==== Republican ====
Cook County Board of Commissioners 16th district Republican primary
| Party | Candidate | Votes | % |
|---|---|---|---|
| Republican | Allan C. Carr (incumbent) | 13,934 | 100 |
| Total votes | | 13,934 | 100 |

=== General election ===
Democratic nominee John E. Bertone withdrew and was not replaced on the ballot.

Cook County Board of Commissioners 16th district election
| Party | Candidate | Votes | % |
|---|---|---|---|
| Republican | Alan C. Carr (incumbent) | 53,453 | 100 |
| Total votes | | 53,453 | 100 |

== 17th district ==
Incumbent third-term commissioner Herb Schumann, a Republican, was reelected.

=== Primaries ===
==== Democratic ====
Cook County Board of Commissioners 17th district Democratic primary
| Party | Candidate | Votes | % |
|---|---|---|---|
| Democratic | John K. Murphy | 10,227 | 100 |
| Total votes | | 10,227 | 100 |

==== Republican ====
Cook County Board of Commissioners 17th district Republican primary
| Party | Candidate | Votes | % |
|---|---|---|---|
| Republican | Herbert T. Schumann, Jr. (incumbent) | 15,613 | 100 |
| Total votes | | 15,613 | 100 |

=== General election ===
Cook County Board of Commissioners 17th district election
| Party | Candidate | Votes | % |
|---|---|---|---|
| Republican | Herbert T. Schumann, Jr. (incumbent) | 50,720 | 56.82 |
| Democratic | John K. Murphy | 38,545 | 43.18 |
| Total votes | | 89,265 | 100 |

== Summarizing statistics ==
Contest summary
| Party | Seats held before | nominees | Seats won |
|---|---|---|---|
| Democratic | 11 | 16 | 12 |
| Republican | —N/a | 11 | —N/a |
| Total | 17 | 27 | 17 |

Contests by parties contesting
| Parties contesting | Total | Democratic wins | Republicans wins |
|---|---|---|---|
| Seats contested by Democratic and Republican nominees | 10 | 6 | 4 |
| Seats contested only by Democratic nominees | 6 | 6 | —N/a |
| Seats contested only by Republican nominees | 1 | —N/a | 1 |
| Total | 17 | 12 | 5 |

Vote summary
| Party | Popular vote | Seats won |
|---|---|---|
| Democratic | 791,445 (70.39%) | 12 |
| Republican | 332,957 (29.61%) | 5 |
| Total | 1,124,402 | —N/a |

Fate of incumbents
| Party | Total incumbents | Incumbents that sought reelection/retired | Incumbents that won/lost re-nomination in primaries | Incumbents that won/lost general election |
|---|---|---|---|---|
| Democratic | 11 | 10 sought reelection 1 retired | 9 won re-nomination 1 lost re-nomination | 9 won 0 lost |
| Republican | 6 | 5 sought reelection 1 retired | 5 won re-nomination 0 lost re-nomination | 4 won 1 lost |
| Total | 17 | 15 sought reelection 2 retired | 14 won re-nomination 1 lost re-nomination | 13 won 1 lost |

Composition of elected board (returning/newly elected members)
| Party | Returning members | Newly elected members | Total members |
|---|---|---|---|
| Democratic | 9 | 3 | 12 |
| Republican | 4 | 1 | 5 |
| Total | 13 | 4 | 17 |
