= 2022 Cook County Board of Commissioners election =

- November 8, 2022

All 17 seats on the Cook County Board of Commissioners 9 seats needed for a majority
| | First party | Second party |
|---|---|---|
| Party | Democratic | Republican |
| Seats before | 15 | 2 |
| Seats won | 16 | 1 |
| Seat change | ▲1 | ▼1 |
| Popular vote | 1,013,467 | 299,095 |
| Percentage | 74.88% | 22.10% |
| Swing | ▼6.91% | ▲3.88% |
- Results: Democratic gain Democratic hold Republican hold Vote Share: 50–60% 60–70% 80–90% >90% 50–60%

The 2022 Cook County Board of Commissioners election saw all seventeen seats of the Cook County Board of Commissioners up for election to four-year terms. The election coincided with other 2022 Cook County, Illinois, elections (including an election for the president of the Board of Commissioners) with the primary elections held on June 28, 2022 and the general election held on November 8, 2022.

As this was the first elections held following the 2020 United States census, the seats faced redistricting before this election. A new map was unanimously adopted by the Cook County Board of Commissioners in September 2021.

Democrats won an increased majority with 16 seats, while Republicans won only a single seat (a net gain of one seat for Democrats and net loss of one seat for Republicans). Thirteen incumbent members won reelection (12 Democrats and 1 Republican). Three incumbent members did not seek reelection (2 Democrats and 1 Republican). One member (a Democrat) was unseated in their primary. A single seat, held by a retiring Republican, changed parties. The Democratic Party ran nominees for all seventeen seats. The Republican Party ran nominees for eleven seats, an increase from the eight seats they ran nominees for in 2018. The Libertarian Party, which had run no nominees in the 2018 election, ran nominees for three seats in 2022.

== 1st district ==
Incumbent 1st district commissioner Brandon Johnson, a Democrat, was reelected to a second term.

=== Democratic primary ===
2022 Cook County Board of Commissioners 1st district Democratic primary
| Party | Candidate | Votes | % |
|---|---|---|---|
| Democratic | Brandon Johnson (incumbent) | 30,702 | 100 |
| Total votes | | 30,702 | 100 |

=== Republican primary ===
No candidate ran in the Republican primary.

=== Libertarian primary ===
2022 Cook County Board of Commissioners 1st district Libertarian primary
| Party | Candidate | Votes | % |
|---|---|---|---|
| Libertarian | James Humay | 108 | 100 |
| Total votes | | 108 | 100 |

=== General election ===
2022 Cook County Board of Commissioners 1st district election
| Party | Candidate | Votes | % |
|---|---|---|---|
| Democratic | Brandon Johnson (incumbent) | 71,077 | 92.87 |
| Libertarian | James Humay | 5,457 | 7.13 |
| Total votes | | 76,534 | 100 |

== 2nd district ==
The incumbent 2nd district commissioner Dennis Deer, a Democrat who was first appointed in 2017, was reelected to a second full term and third overall term.

=== Democratic primary ===
2022 Cook County Board of Commissioners 2nd district Democratic primary
| Party | Candidate | Votes | % |
|---|---|---|---|
| Democratic | Dennis Deer (incumbent) | 11,852 | 55.01 |
| Democratic | Andre Smith | 9,678 | 44.99 |
| Total votes | | 21,510 | 100 |

=== Republican primary ===
No candidate ran in the Republican primary. The Republican Party ultimately nominated Evan Kasal.

=== General election ===
2022 Cook County Board of Commissioners 2nd district election
| Party | Candidate | Votes | % |
|---|---|---|---|
| Democratic | Dennis Deer (incumbent) | 53,053 | 87.92 |
| Republican | Evan Kasal | 7,292 | 12.08 |
| Total votes | | 60,345 | 100 |

== 3rd district ==
Incumbent 3rd district commissioner Bill Lowry, a Democrat, was reelected to a second term. He was unopposed in both the Democratic primary and general election.

=== Democratic primary ===
2022 Cook County Board of Commissioners 3rd district Democratic primary
| Party | Candidate | Votes | % |
|---|---|---|---|
| Democratic | Bill Lowry (incumbent) | 34,896 | 100 |
| Total votes | | 34,896 | 100 |

=== Republican primary ===
No candidate ran in the Republican primary.

=== General election ===
2022 Cook County Board of Commissioners 3rd district election
| Party | Candidate | Votes | % |
|---|---|---|---|
| Democratic | Bill Lowry (incumbent) | 75,868 | 100 |
| Total votes | | 75,868 | 100 |

== 4th district ==
The incumbent 4th District commissioner Stanley Moore, a Democrat, was reelected to a third full (fourth overall) term.

=== Democratic primary ===
2022 Cook County Board of Commissioners 4th district Democratic primary
| Party | Candidate | Votes | % |
|---|---|---|---|
| Democratic | Stanley Moore (incumbent) | 34,408 | 100 |
| Total votes | | 34,408 | 100 |

=== Republican primary ===
No candidate ran in the Republican primary. Republicans ultimately nominated Lynn Franco.

=== General election ===
2022 Cook County Board of Commissioners 4th district election
| Party | Candidate | Votes | % |
|---|---|---|---|
| Democratic | Stanley Moore (incumbent) | 67,481 | 90.56 |
| Republican | Lynn Franco | 7,036 | 9.44 |
| Total votes | | 74,517 | 100 |

== 5th district ==
Democrat Monica Gordon was elected to the 5th district seat. The incumbent 5th district commissioner was Deborah Sims, a seventh-term Democrat who did not seek reelection.

=== Democratic primary ===
Monica Gordon, a trustee of Prairie State College, won the primary. She was endorsed by retiring incumbent Debora Sims.

2022 Cook County Board of Commissioners 5th district Democratic primary
| Party | Candidate | Votes | % |
|---|---|---|---|
| Democratic | Monica M. Gordon | 10,465 | 35.54 |
| Democratic | Kierra Williams | 7,533 | 25.58 |
| Democratic | Jaylin D. McClinton | 5,739 | 19.49 |
| Democratic | Vernard L. Alsberry Jr. | 5,712 | 19.40 |
| Total votes | | 26,449 | 100 |

=== Republican primary ===
No candidate ran in the Republican primary.

=== Libertarian nomination ===
The Libertarian Party nominated Jason Decker.

=== General election ===
2022 Cook County Board of Commissioners 5th district election
| Party | Candidate | Votes | % |
|---|---|---|---|
| Democratic | Monica M. Gordon | 63,385 | 91.35 |
| Libertarian | Jason Decker | 6,005 | 8.65 |
| Total votes | | 69,390 | 100 |

== 6th district ==
Incumbent 6th district commissioner Donna Miller, a Democrat, was reelected to a second term.

=== Democratic primary ===
2022 Cook County Board of Commissioners 7th district Democratic primary
| Party | Candidate | Votes | % |
|---|---|---|---|
| Democratic | Donna Miller (incumbent) | 22,628 | 100 |
| Total votes | | 22,628 | 100 |

=== Republican primary ===
No candidate ran in the Republican primary, but the party nominated Anna Biedrzycki.

=== General election ===
2022 Cook County Board of Commissioners 6th district election
| Party | Candidate | Votes | % |
|---|---|---|---|
| Democratic | Donna Miller (incumbent) | 55,250 | 62.28 |
| Republican | Anna Biedrzycki | 25,664 | 31.72 |
| Total votes | | 80,914 | 100 |

== 7th district ==
Incumbent 7th district commissioner Alma Anaya, a Democrat, was reelected to a second term. She was unopposed in both the Democratic primary and the general election.

=== Democratic primary ===
2022 Cook County Board of Commissioners 7th district Democratic primary
| Party | Candidate | Votes | % |
|---|---|---|---|
| Democratic | Alma E. Anaya (incumbent) | 10,439 | 100 |
| Total votes | | 10,439 | 100 |

=== Republican primary ===
No candidate ran in the Republican primary.

=== General election ===
2022 Cook County Board of Commissioners 7th district election
| Party | Candidate | Votes | % |
|---|---|---|---|
| Democratic | Alma E. Anaya (incumbent) | 29,480 | 100 |
| Total votes | | 29,480 | 100 |

== 8th district ==
Anthony Joel Quezada was elected to the 8th district seat, being unopposed in the general election. Incumbent 8th district commissioner is Luis Arroyo Jr., a second-term Democrat, was defeated for renomination in the Democratic primary by Quezada.

=== Democratic primary ===
2022 Cook County Board of Commissioners 8th district Democratic primary
| Party | Candidate | Votes | % |
|---|---|---|---|
| Democratic | Anthony Joel Quezada | 8,882 | 35.00 |
| Democratic | Luis Arroyo Jr. (incumbent) | 4,902 | 19.31 |
| Democratic | Natalie Toro | 4,130 | 16.27 |
| Democratic | Rory McHale | 3,890 | 15.33 |
| Democratic | Edwin Reyes | 3,576 | 14.09 |
| Total votes | | 25,380 | 100 |

=== Republican primary ===
No candidate ran in the Republican primary.

=== General election ===
2022 Cook County Board of Commissioners 8th district election
| Party | Candidate | Votes | % |
|---|---|---|---|
| Democratic | Anthony Joel Quezada | 53,400 | 100 |
| Total votes | | 53,400 | 100 |

== 9th district ==
Democratic nominee Maggie Trevor won the 9th district seat, flipping the longtime Republican seat to the Democratic Party. Incumbent 9th district commissioner is Peter N. Silvestri, a seventh-term Republican, did not seek reelection.

=== Democratic primary ===
Maggie Trevor won the Democratic nomination. Trevor had previously been the unsuccessful Democratic 2018 and 2020 Democratic nominee for the 54th district seat in the Illinois House of Representatives.

2022 Cook County Board of Commissioners 9th district Democratic primary
| Party | Candidate | Votes | % |
|---|---|---|---|
| Democratic | Maggie Trevor | 9,053 | 38.56 |
| Democratic | Sam Kukadia | 7,184 | 30.60 |
| Democratic | Heather Anne Boyle | 5,111 | 21.77 |
| Democratic | Frank L. McPartlin | 2,131 | 9.08 |
| Total votes | | 23,479 | 100 |

=== Republican primary ===
2022 Cook County Board of Commissioners 9th district Republican primary
| Party | Candidate | Votes | % |
|---|---|---|---|
| Republican | Matt Podgorski | 12,804 | 73.32 |
| Republican | Mark Hosty | 2,403 | 13.76 |
| Republican | Frank L. Cocante | 2,255 | 12.91 |
| Total votes | | 17,462 | 100 |

=== General election ===
2022 Cook County Board of Commissioners 9th district election
| Party | Candidate | Votes | % |
|---|---|---|---|
| Democratic | Maggie Trevor | 53,531 | 50.32 |
| Republican | Matt Podgorski | 52,851 | 49.68 |
| Total votes | | 106,382 | 100 |

== 10th district ==
Incumbent 10th district commissioner Bridget Gainer, a Democrat, was reelected to a third full (fourth overall) term.

=== Democratic primary ===
2022 Cook County Board of Commissioners 10th district Democratic primary
| Party | Candidate | Votes | % |
|---|---|---|---|
| Democratic | Bridget Gainer (incumbent) | 41,891 | 100 |
| Total votes | | 41,891 | 100 |

=== Republican primary ===
No candidates ran in the Republican primary. The Republican Party ultimately nominated Laura Mary Kotelman.

=== General election ===
2022 Cook County Board of Commissioners 10th district election
| Party | Candidate | Votes | % |
|---|---|---|---|
| Democratic | Bridget Gainer (incumbent) | 90,627 | 80.76 |
| Republican | Laura Mary Kotelman | 21,587 | 19.24 |
| Total votes | | 112,214 | 100 |

== 11th district ==
Incumbent 11th district commissioner John P. Daley, a Democrat, was reelected to a seventh full (eighth overall) term.

=== Democratic primary ===
2022 Cook County Board of Commissioners 11th district Democratic primary
| Party | Candidate | Votes | % |
|---|---|---|---|
| Democratic | John P. Daley (incumbent) | 22,207 | 100 |
| Total votes | | 22,207 | 100 |

=== Republican primary ===
2022 Cook County Board of Commissioners 11th district Republican primary
| Party | Candidate | Votes | % |
|---|---|---|---|
| Republican | Declan J. Smith | 6,997 | 100 |
| Total votes | | 6,997 | 100 |

=== Libertarian primary ===
2022 Cook County Board of Commissioners 11th district Libertarian primary
| Party | Candidate | Votes | % |
|---|---|---|---|
| Libertarian | Brandon Sizelove | 114 | 100 |
| Total votes | | 114 | 100 |

=== General election ===
2022 Cook County Board of Commissioners 11th district election
| Party | Candidate | Votes | % |
|---|---|---|---|
| Democratic | John P. Daley (incumbent) | 48,435 | 62.68 |
| Republican | Declan J. Smith | 26,029 | 33.68 |
| Libertarian | Brandon Sizelove | 2,815 | 3.64 |
| Total votes | | 77,279 | 100 |

== 12th district ==
Incumbent 12th district commissioner Bridget Degnen, a Democrat, was reelected to a second term.

=== Democratic primary ===
2022 Cook County Board of Commissioners 12th district Democratic primary
| Party | Candidate | Votes | % |
|---|---|---|---|
| Democratic | Bridget Dengen (incumbent) | 32,879 | 100 |
| Total votes | | 32,879 | 100 |

=== Republican primary ===
No candidates ran in the Republican primary. Republicans ultimately nominated Alice Hu.

=== General election ===
2022 Cook County Board of Commissioners 12th district election
| Party | Candidate | Votes | % |
|---|---|---|---|
| Democratic | Bridget Dengen (incumbent) | 80,278 | 81.21 |
| Republican | Xiaoli "Alice" Hu | 18,571 | 18.79 |
| Total votes | | 98,849 | 100 |

== 13th district ==
Democratic nominee Josina Morita was elected to the 13th district seat. Incumbent 13th district commissioner Larry Suffredin, a fifth-term Democrat, did not seek reelection.

=== Democratic primary ===
2022 Cook County Board of Commissioners 13th district Democratic primary
| Party | Candidate | Votes | % |
|---|---|---|---|
| Democratic | Josina Morita | 30,379 | 100 |
| Total votes | | 30,379 | 100 |

=== Republican primary ===
No candidates ran in the Republican primary. Republicans ultimately nominated Andrew Border.

=== General election ===
2022 Cook County Board of Commissioners 13th district election
| Party | Candidate | Votes | % |
|---|---|---|---|
| Democratic | Josina Morita | 70,431 | 80.16 |
| Republican | Andrew Border | 17,435 | 19.84 |
| Total votes | | 87,867 | 100 |

== 14th district ==
Incumbent 14th district commissioner Scott R. Britton, a Democrat, was reelected to a second term.

=== Democratic primary ===
2022 Cook County Board of Commissioners 14th district Democratic primary
| Party | Candidate | Votes | % |
|---|---|---|---|
| Democratic | Scott R. Britton (incumbent) | 24,976 | 100 |
| Total votes | | 24,976 | 100 |

=== Republican primary ===
2022 Cook County Board of Commissioners 14th district Republican primary
| Party | Candidate | Votes | % |
|---|---|---|---|
| Republican | Benton Howser | 11,869 | 100 |
| Total votes | | 11,869 | 100 |

=== General election ===
2022 Cook County Board of Commissioners 14th district election
| Party | Candidate | Votes | % |
|---|---|---|---|
| Democratic | Scott R. Britton (incumbent) | 67,575 | 61.28 |
| Republican | Benton Howser | 42,703 | 38.72 |
| Total votes | | 110,278 | 100 |

== 15th district ==
Incumbent 15th district commissioner Kevin B. Morrison, was reelected to a second term.

=== Democratic primary ===
2022 Cook County Board of Commissioners 15th district Democratic primary
| Party | Candidate | Votes | % |
|---|---|---|---|
| Democratic | Kevin B. Morrison (incumbent) | 16,286 | 100 |
| Total votes | | 16,286 | 100 |

=== Republican primary ===
2022 Cook County Board of Commissioners 15th district Republican primary
| Party | Candidate | Votes | % |
|---|---|---|---|
| Republican | Chuck Cerniglia | 7,367 | 70.53 |
| Republican | Kevin A. Ake | 3,078 | 29.47 |
| Total votes | | 10,445 | 100 |

=== General election ===
2022 Cook County Board of Commissioners 15th district election
| Party | Candidate | Votes | % |
|---|---|---|---|
| Democratic | Kevin B. Morrison (incumbent) | 43,858 | 57.80 |
| Republican | Chuck Cerniglia | 32,027 | 42.20 |
| Total votes | | 75,885 | 100 |

== 16th district ==
Incumbent 16th district commissioner Frank Aguilar, a Democrat who was appointed in 2020, was elected to a full term.

=== Democratic primary ===
2022 Cook County Board of Commissioners 16th district Democratic primary
| Party | Candidate | Votes | % |
|---|---|---|---|
| Democratic | Frank J. Aguilar (incumbent) | 9,715 | 54.27 |
| Democratic | Leticia "Letty" Garcia | 8,185 | 45.73 |
| Total votes | | 17,900 | 100 |

=== Republican primary ===
2022 Cook County Board of Commissioners 16th district Republican primary
| Party | Candidate | Votes | % |
|---|---|---|---|
| Republican | Kimberly Jagielski | 4,852 | 100 |
| Total votes | | 4,852 | 100 |

=== General election ===
2022 Cook County Board of Commissioners 16th district election
| Party | Candidate | Votes | % |
|---|---|---|---|
| Democratic | Frank J. Aguilar (incumbent) | 38,100 | 67.75 |
| Republican | Kimberly Jagielski | 18,138 | 32.25 |
| Total votes | | 56,238 | 100 |

== 17th district ==
Incumbent 17th district commissioner Sean M. Morrison, a Republican, was reelected to a second full (third overall) term. He was the only Republican nominee to win any Cook County partisan elections in 2022.

=== Democratic primary ===
2022 Cook County Board of Commissioners 17th district Democratic primary
| Party | Candidate | Votes | % |
|---|---|---|---|
| Democratic | Daniel T. Calandriello | 11,501 | 53.90 |
| Democratic | Lou Gale | 9,836 | 46.10 |
| Total votes | | 21,337 | 100 |

=== Republican primary ===
2022 Cook County Board of Commissioners 17th district Republican primary
| Party | Candidate | Votes | % |
|---|---|---|---|
| Republican | Sean M. Morrison (incumbent) | 11,615 | 57.05 |
| Republican | Elizabeth "Liz" Doody Gorman | 8,745 | 42.95 |
| Total votes | | 20,360 | 100.0 |

=== General election ===
2022 Cook County Board of Commissioners 17th district election
| Party | Candidate | Votes | % |
|---|---|---|---|
| Republican | Sean M. Morrison (incumbent) | 55,426 | 51.29 |
| Democratic | Daniel T. Calandriello | 52,638 | 48.71 |
| Total votes | | 108,064 | 100 |

== Summarizing statistics ==
Contest summary
| Party | Seats held before | Seats contested | Seats won |
|---|---|---|---|
| Democratic | 15 | 17 | 16 |
| Republican | 2 | 11 | 1 |
| Libertarian | 0 | 3 | 0 |

Contests by parties contesting
| Parties contesting | Total | Democratic wins | Republicans wins |
|---|---|---|---|
| Seats contested by Democratic, Republican, and Libertarian nominees | 1 | 1 | 0 |
| Seats contested by Democratic and Republican nominees (no Libertarian) | 10 | 9 | 1 |
| Seats contested by Democratic and Libertarian nominees (no Republican) | 2 | 2 | —N/a |
| Seats contested only by Democratic nominees | 4 | 4 | —N/a |

Vote summary
| Party | Popular vote | Seats won |
|---|---|---|
| Democratic | 1,013,467 (74.88%) | 16 |
| Republican | 299,095 (22.10%) | 1 |
| Libertarian | 39,491 (2.88%) | 0 |
| Total | 1,352,053 | —N/a |

Fate of incumbents
| Party | Total incumbents | Incumbents that sought reelection/retired | Incumbents that won/lost re-nomination in primaries | Incumbents that were renominated |
|---|---|---|---|---|
| Democratic | 15 | 13 sought reelection 2 retired | 12 won re-nomination 1 lost renomination | 12 won reelection 0 lost |
| Republican | 2 | 1 sought reelection 1 retired | 1 won re-nomination 0 lost renomination | 1 won reelection 0 lost |
| Libertarian | There were no Libertarian incumbents | | | |

Composition of elected board (returning/newly elected members)
| Party | Returning members | Newly elected members |
|---|---|---|
| Democratic | 12 | 4 |
| Republican | 1 | 0 |
| Libertarian | 0 | 0 |
