= Cook County Board of Commissioners 13th district =

- District
- District 13
- Current Board of Commissioners map, 13th district highlighted in red
- Country: United States
- State: Illinois
- County: Cook
- Townships and equivalent jurisdictions: list: Chicago; Evanston; Jefferson Township; Niles Township

Government
  - Type: District
  - Body: Cook County Board of Commissioners
  - Commissioner: Josina Morita (D)

Cook County Board of Commissioners 13th district is a single-member electoral district for the Cook County Board of Commissioners. It is currently represented by Josina Morita, a Democrat.

== History ==
The district was established in 1994, when the board transitioned from holding elections in individual districts, as opposed to the previous practice of having two multi-member districts: one for ten members from the city of Chicago and another for seven members from suburban Cook County.

== Geography ==
=== 1994 boundaries ===
When the district was first established, it covered parts of the North Side of Chicago and the northern suburbs of Cook County.

=== 2001 redistricting ===
New boundaries were adopted in August 2001, with redistricting taking place following the 2000 United States census.

In regards to townships and equivalent jurisdictions, the district's redistricted boundaries included portions of the city of Chicago and portions of the Evanston, Maine, New Trier, Niles, and Northfield townships.

=== 2012 redistricting ===
The district, as redistricted in 2012 following the 2010 United States census, largely resembled its 2001 form. It included the West Ridge and Rogers Park areas of the City of Chicago as well as Evanston, Glencoe, Glenview, Kenilworth, Lincolnwood, Morton Grove, Northbrook, Northfield, Skokie, Wilmette, and Winnetka in the north suburbs. In regards to townships and equivalent jurisdictions, it included portions of the cities of Chicago, Evanston, as well as Niles, Northfield, and New Trier townships. With Evanston and New Trier Township, the district covered their entirety. It also covered the majority of Niles Township. Only a small segment of Northfield township was included in the district. Evanston was in Evanston Township, until it dissolved in 2014.

The district was 47.75 square miles (30,562.12 acres).

=== 2022 redistricting ===
The district as redistricted in 2022, following the 2020 United States census, contains the entirety of Evanston, the entirety of Niles and Rogers Park Townships, and small portions of the Lake View and Rogers Park neighborhoods of Chicago.

== Politics ==
The district has leaned strongly Democratic in its elections to the Cook County Board of Commissioners.

== List of commissioners representing the district ==
Commissioner	Party	Years	Electoral history
Calvin Sutker	Democratic	December 1994–December 2002	Elected in 1994 and 1998; lost reelection in 2002
Larry Suffredin	Democratic	December 2002–December 5, 2022	Elected in 2002, 2006, 2010, 2014, 2018
Josina Morita	Democratic	December 5, 2022–present	Elected in 2022

== Election results ==
Cook County Board of Commissioners 13th district general elections
Year	Winning candidate	Party	Vote (pct)	Opponent	Party	Vote (pct)	Opponent	Party	Vote (pct)
1994	Calvin Sutker	Democratic		Lourdes Gagui Mon	Republican				
1998	Calvin Sutker	Democratic	53,277 (70.74%)	Ellen R. Schrodt	Republican	22,037 (29.26%)			
2002	Larry Suffredin	Democratic	59,151 (69.92%)	Robert D. Shearer Jr.	Republican	25,450 (30.08%)			
2006	Larry Suffredin	Democratic	71,801 (100%)						
2010	Larry Suffredin	Democratic	62,562 (67.71%)	Linda Thompson LaFianza	Republican	24,597 (26.62%)	George E. Milkowski	Green	5,241 (5.67%)
2014	Larry Suffredin	Democrat	68,715 (100%)						
2018	Larry Suffredin	Democratic	95,500 (77.54%)	Chris J. Hanusiak	Republican	27,662 (22.46%)			
2022	Josina Morita	Democratic	70,431 (80.16%)	Andrew Border	Republican	17,435 (19.84%)			
