= Richard Boykin =

American politician (born 1968)

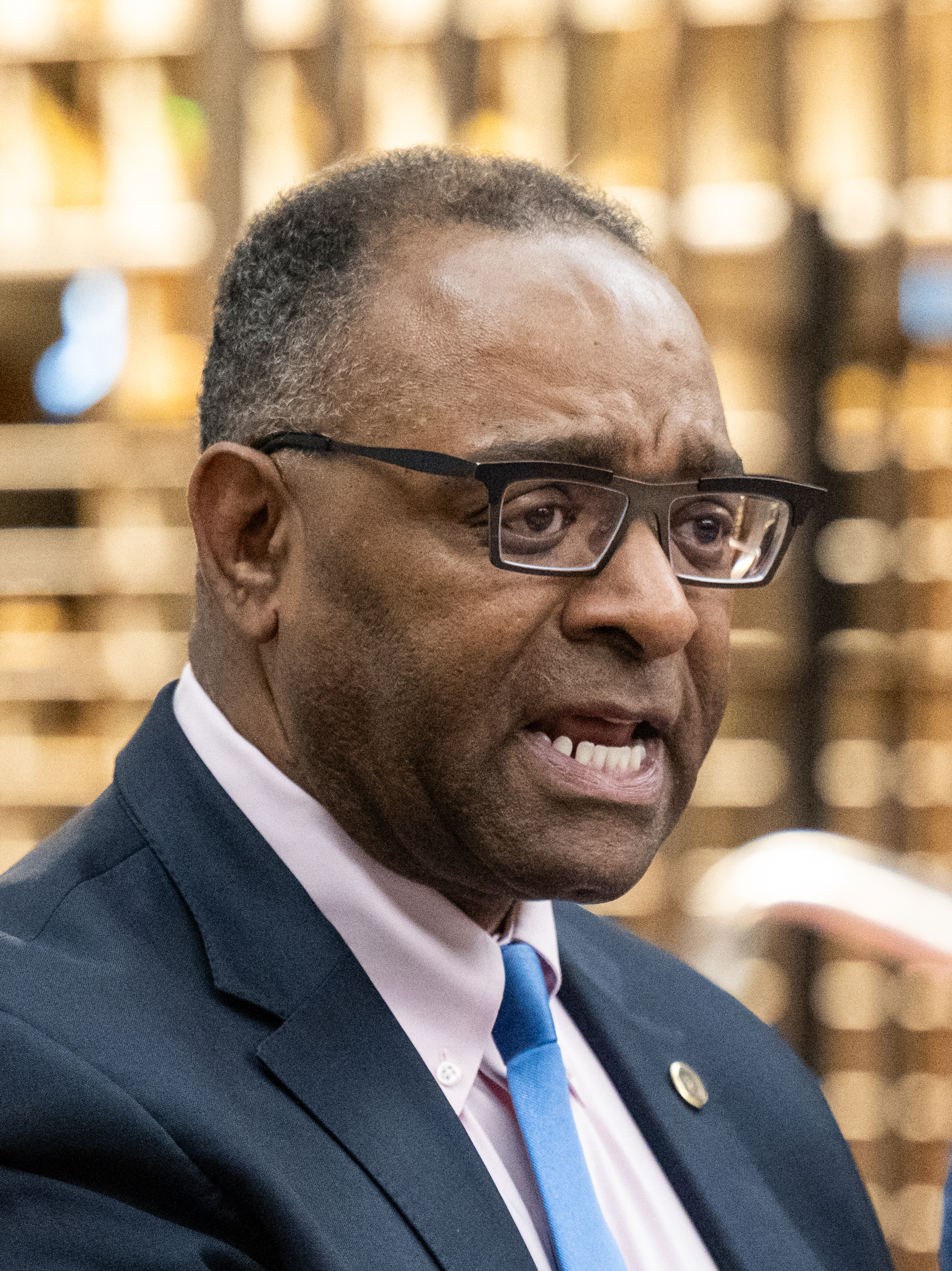
- Boykin in 2026

Member of the Cook County Board of Commissioners from the 1st district
- In office December 1, 2014 – November 28, 2018
- Preceded by: Earlean Collins
- Succeeded by: Brandon Johnson

Personal details
- Born: September 9, 1968 (age 57) Jackson, Mississippi, U.S.
- Party: Democratic
- Education: Central State University (BS); University of Dayton (JD)

Richard R. Boykin (born September 9, 1968) is an American politician who served on the Cook County Board of Commissioners, representing the 1st district from December 2014 until December 2018.

== Political career ==
Boykins in 2012

Boykin was elected in 2014 to represent the 1st district on the Cook County Board of Commissioners. The 1st district covers both Chicago and its suburbs. It includes the Chicago neighborhoods of Garfield Park, and Humboldt Park, and the suburbs of Broadview, Maywood, Bellwood, Forest Park, Oak Park, and Elmwood Park.

On the Cook County Board of Commissioners, Boykin opposed the controversial "soda tax". Boykin came into conflict with the County Board President Toni Preckwinkle on this matter. Boykin took the lead against the tax, and succeeded in getting the Board to repeal it in 2017. On the infrequent votes by the Board that saw division by its members, Boykin was among the Board members who most regularly voted against the positions of County Board President Preckwinkle and her floor leader, Chuy García.

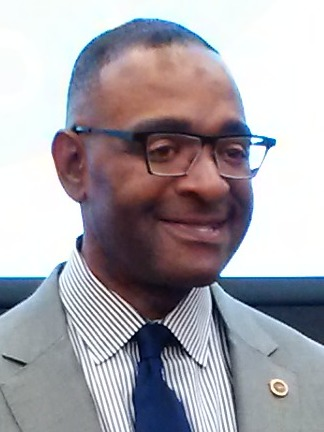
Boykins in 2017

Per a 2018 analysis by the Chicago Sun-Times, Boykin had a high rate of attendance at board meetings, with the analysis finding him to have only missed 2% of meetings during a period from 2014 through 2017. The study found only John P. Daley to have a greater rate of attendance.

In 2018, Boykin narrowly lost reelection in the Democratic primary to Brandon Johnson, who had been endorsed against Boykin by Toni Preckwinkle.

In 2020, Boykin unsuccessfully ran for the Democratic nomination for Clerk of the Circuit Court of Cook County. Boykin unsuccessfully challenged President of the Cook County Board of Commissioners Toni Preckwinkle in that office's 2022 Democratic Party primary.

Boykin ran for the U.S. House of Representatives in 2026, unsuccessfully seeking the Democratic nomination in Illinois's 7th congressional district.

== Electoral history ==
2014 Cook County Board of Commissioners 1st district Democratic primary
Party	Candidate	Votes	%
Democratic	Richard R. Boykin	7,288	30.38
Democratic	Blake Sercye	6,118	25.51
Democratic	Isaac "Ike" Carothers	5,602	23.35
Democratic	Brenda Smith	4,111	17.14
Democratic	Ronald Lawless	868	3.62
Total votes		23,987	100

2014 Cook County Board of Commissioners 1st district election
Party	Candidate	Votes	%
Democratic	Richard R. Boykin	68,305	99.36
Write-in	Others	441	0.64
Total votes		68,746	100

2018 Cook County Board of Commissioners 1st district Democratic primary
Party	Candidate	Votes	%
Democratic	Brandon Johnson	24,863	50.44
Democratic	Richard Boykin (incumbent)	24,426	49.56
Total votes		49,289	100

2020 Clerk of the Circuit Court of Cook County Democratic primary
Party	Candidate	Votes	%
Democratic	Iris Y. Martinez	269,578	33.67
Democratic	Michael M. Cabonargi	216,180	27.00
Democratic	Richard R. Boykin	199,526	24.92
Democratic	Jacob Meister	113,855	14.22
Write-in	Others	1,511	0.19
Total votes		800,650	100

2022 President of the Cook County Board of Commissioners Democratic primary
Party	Candidate	Votes	%
Democratic	Toni Preckwinkle (incumbent)	374,699	75.76
Democratic	Richard Boykin	119,915	24.24
Total votes		494,614	100
