= Herb Schumann =

American politician

Herbert T. Schumann, Jr.

Cook County Commissioner from the 17th district
- In office December 1994 – December 2002
- Preceded by: Constituency established
- Succeeded by: Liz Gorman

Cook County Commissioner from suburban Cook County
- In office 1990 – December 1994
- Preceded by: Harold Tyrrell
- Succeeded by: constituency abolished

Personal details
- Born: 1951 or 1952
- Party: Republican
- Spouse: Colleen
- Children: 2
- Education: Governors State University (B.A.); DePaul University (MBA)

Herbert T. Schumann, Jr. is an American politician who formerly served as a Cook County commissioner from 1990 to 2002.

== Early life and education ==
Schumann was born in either 1951 or 1952.

Shumann's father, Herb Schumann Sr., was one of the incorporators of Palos Hills, Illinois and was, for 18 years until his 1990 death, a Palos Township supervisor.

Schumann earned a Bachelor of Arts from Governors State University. Schumann then earned a Master of Business Administration in finance from DePaul University.

== Career ==
From 1974 to 1977, Schumann served as a trustee of Moraine Valley Community College.

In 1982, Schumann ran unsuccessfully for the Cook County Board of Commissioners.

From 1986 through 2002, he served as Palos Township Republican committeeman chairing the Palos Township Republican Organization, and having been elected in 1986, 1990, 1994, and 1998.

In 1992, he was the Republican nominee for Clerk of the Circuit Court of Cook County, losing the election to Democrat Aurelia Pucinski.

He served for a time as the Chairman of the Cook County Republican Party.

=== Cook County Board of Commissioners ===
From 1990 through 2002, Shumann served as Cook County commissioner. He was appointed in 1990 as a member from suburban Cook County, filling the vacancy left by the death in office of Harold Tyrrell. He was reelected in 1990. In 1994, when the board switched to single-member districts, he was elected to represent the 17th district. He was subsequently reelected in 1998. In 2002 he lost reelection in the Republican primary to Elizabeth Ann Doody Gorman. During his campaign against Gorman, he had criticized her connections with Edward Vrdolyak, while she criticized him for "voting with" board president John Stroger.

In 1991, he and president of the Cook County Board of Commissioners Richard Phelan proposed a plan to levy a tax on non-hazardous solid waste accepted by landfill operators.

In 1992, he and three other Republican suburban Cook County commissioners filed a lawsuit to stop board president Richard Phelan's executive order to allow elective abortions at county hospitals.

He and Maria Pappas were the only two members to vote against the districting map adopted when the Board of Commissioners switched to single-member districts in 1994.

During part of his tenure, he chaired the board's environment committee.

Ahead of the 1993 township elections in Palos Township, he partnered with some Democrats to form the Palos Township Independent Party. The party would, in the following years, see success in township elections.

In the mid-1990s, Schumann was critical towards the expense of county's purchase and renovation of the Brunswick Building to serve as a new location for county offices.

During part of his tenure on the Cook County Board of Commissioners, he served as a member of the Northeastern Illinois Planning Commission appointed by the County Board. This included serving as the commission's president.

=== Later career ===
After losing his seat, he began working many years as a finance director under president of the Cook County Board of Commissioners John Stroger and his successors Bobbie L. Steele and Todd Stroger.

Schumann worked as a property tax analyst employed by the Cook County Board of Review.

Schumann served on the Palos Lions Cal Sag Watershed Council.

In 2014, Schumann ran unsuccessfully for a seat on the Water Reclamation District of Greater Chicago board.

In 2016, Schumann ran unsuccessfully as the Republican nominee for the seat on the Water Reclamation District of Greater Chicago board vacated when Patrick Daley Thompson resigned to assume office as a Chicago alderman. The seat had been filled with an interim appointment by Governor Bruce Rauner of Republican David J. Walsh, however Walsh did not seek reelection and Schumann had won the Republican nomination unopposed. He received the endorsements of the Chicago Sun-Times and Chicago Tribune in the general election.

== Personal life ==
Schumann and his wife Colleen have a son named Lucas and daughter named Mackenzi. When he first joined the Cook County Board of Commissioners in 1990, he resided in Palos Hills, Illinois. As of 2014, he lived in Palos Heights, Illinois.

Schumann's wife Colleen Schumann became a Palos Township supervisor in 2005, an office she held for many years thereafter.

== Electoral history ==
=== Cook County Board of Commissioners ===
1982

1990

1990 Cook County Board of Commissioners suburban Cook County Republican primary
Party	Candidate	Votes	%
Republican	Carl R. Hansen (incumbent)	101,223	14.11
Republican	Mary M. McDonald (incumbent)	99,894	13.93
Republican	Allan C. Carr (incumbent)	95,978	13.38
Republican	Richard A. Siebel (incumbent)	94,638	13.19
Republican	Aldo A. DeAngelis	85,395	11.90
Republican	Harold L. Tyrell (incumbent)	85,003	11.85
Republican	Herbert T. Schumann, Jr. (incumbent)	84,087	11.72
Republican	William L. Russ	71,120	9.91

1990 Cook County Board of Commissioners suburban Cook County election
Party	Candidate	Votes	%
Republican	Mary M. McDonald (incumbent)	326,865	8.78
Republican	Aldo A. DeAngelis	314,466	8.44
Republican	Carl R. Hansen (incumbent)	313,917	8.43
Democratic	Richard J. Phelan	298,067	8.00
Republican	Richard A. Siebel (incumbent)	294,886	7.92
Republican	Herbert T. Schumann, Jr. (incumbent)	273,368	7.34
Republican	Allan C. Carr (incumbent)	268,823	7.22
Democratic	Patricia Kane McLaughlin	256,494	6.89
Republican	Angelo "Skip" Saviano	252,373	6.78
Democratic	Sheila H. Schultz	246,986	6.63
Democratic	Pat Capuzzi	233,521	6.27
Democratic	Thomas M. O'Donnell	225,171	6.05
Democratic	Ervin F. Kozicki	210,196	5.64
Democratic	Edward C. Reinfranck	209,290	5.62

1994

1994 Cook County Board of Commissioners 17th district Republican primary
Party	Candidate	Votes	%
Republican	Herbert T. Schumann, Jr. (redistricted incumbent)	9,069	65.53
Republican	Teresa Nuccio	4,770	34.47
Total votes		13,839	100

1994 Cook County Board of Commissioners 17th district election
Party	Candidate	Votes	%
Republican	Herbert T. Schumann, Jr. (redistricted incumbent)	54,502	65.85
Democratic	William M. Hurley	28,267	34.15
Total votes		82,769	100

1998

1998 Cook County Board of Commissioners 17th district Republican primary
Party	Candidate	Votes	%
Republican	Herbert T. Schumann, Jr. (incumbent)	15,613	100
Total votes		15,613	100

1998 Cook County Board of Commissioners 17th district election
Party	Candidate	Votes	%
Republican	Herbert T. Schumann, Jr. (incumbent)	50,720	56.82
Democratic	John K. Murphy	38,545	43.18
Total votes		89,265	100

2002

2002 Cook County Board of Commissioners 17th district Republican primary
Party	Candidate	Votes	%
Republican	Elizabeth "Liz" Doody Gorman	11,345	51.41
Republican	Herbert T. Schumann, Jr. (incumbent)	10,721	48.59
Total votes		22,066	100

=== Palos Township Republican Committeeman ===
1986 Palos Township Republican Committeeman election
Party	Candidate	Votes	%
Republican	Herbert T. Schaumann, Jr.	875	50.52
Republican	Bruce W. Barnes	857	49.48
Total votes		1,732	100

1990 Palos Township Republican Committeeman election
Party	Candidate	Votes	%
Republican	Herbert T. Schaumann, Jr.	2,484	62.43
Republican	Bruce W. Barnes	1,495	37.57
Total votes		3,979	100

1994 Palos Township Republican Committeeman election
Party	Candidate	Votes	%
Republican	Herbert T. Schaumann, Jr.	1,828	100
Total votes		1,828	100

1998 Palos Township Republican Committeeman election
Party	Candidate	Votes	%
Republican	Herbert T. Schaumann, Jr.	2,151	100
Total votes		2,151	100

=== Clerk of the Circuit Court of Cook County ===
1992

Clerk of the Circuit Court of Cook County Republican primary
Party	Candidate	Votes	%
Republican	Herbert T. Schumann, Jr.	146,046	100
Total votes		146,046	100

Clerk of the Circuit Court of Cook County election
Party	Candidate	Votes	%
Democratic	Aurelia Marie Pucinski	1,349,837	68.39
Republican	Herbert T. Schumann, Jr.	486,185	24.63
Harold Washington	Deloris "Dee" Jones	137,642	6.97
Total votes		1,973,664	100

=== Metropolitan Water Reclamation District of Greater Chicago board ===
2014

2014 Metropolitan Water Reclamation District of Greater Chicago board Republican primary
Party	Candidate	Votes	%
Republican	James "Jim" Parrilli	87,164	33.81
Republican	Herb Schumann	85,504	33.16
Republican	R. Cary Capparelli	85,161	33.03
Total votes		257,829	100

2014 Metropolitan Water Reclamation District of Greater Chicago board election
Party	Candidate	Votes	%
Democratic	Cynthia M. Santos (incumbent)	691,880	22.49
Democratic	Frank Avila (incumbent)	617,361	20.06
Democratic	Timothy "Tim" Bradford	593,522	19.29
Republican	James "Jim" Parrill	290,138	9.43
Republican	Herb Schumann	279,855	9.10
Republican	R. Cary Capparelli	254,142	8.26
Green	Karen Roothaan	130,319	4.24
Green	George Milkowski	108,888	3.54
Green	Michael Smith	110,851	3.60
Total votes		3,076,956	100

2016

2016 Water Reclamation District Board unexpired term Republican primary
Party	Candidate	Votes	%
Republican	Herb Schumann	194,158	100
Total votes		194,158	100

2016 Water Reclamation District Board unexpired term election
Party	Candidate	Votes	%
Democratic	Martin J. Durkan	1,220,944	64.13
Republican	Herb Schumann	482,277	25.33
Green	Christopher Anthony	200,706	10.54
Total votes		1,903,927	100
