= Elizabeth Ann Doody Gorman =

American politician

Liz Gorman
- Gorman in 2002

Member of the Cook County Board of Commissioners from the 17th district
- In office December 2002 – July 20, 2015
- Preceded by: Herb Schumann
- Succeeded by: Sean M. Morrison

Chair of the Cook County Republican Party
- In office 2007–2008
- Preceded by: Gary Skoien
- Succeeded by: Lee Roupas

Personal details
- Born: February 19, 1968 (age 58) Chicago
- Party: Republican
- Spouse: Gerald
- Education: Saint Mary's University; University of Notre Dame

Elizabeth "Liz" Doody Gorman (born February 19, 1968) is a Republican member of the Cook County Board of Commissioners from 2002 until her resignation in 2015 to accept a job in the private sector. Gorman served as Chairman of the Cook County Republican Party from 2007 to 2008, and was the Orland Township Republican Committeeman, until she was defeated by Cindy Katsenes in 2022.

Gorman is the owner of Gorman Insurance Group.

== Early life ==
Gorman was born February 19, 1968, at Englewood Hospital in Chicago. She was raised in the Beverly neighborhood. Gorman is a graduate of Mother McAuley High School and Saint Mary's University of Minnesota where she received her B.A. in marketing. Gorman graduated from the University of Notre Dame Executive MBA program with a Master of Business Administration on May 18, 2008.

== Cook County Commissioner ==
First elected in November 2002, re-elected in 2006 and 2010, on March 18, 2014, Gorman fought off a primary challenge, defeating her opponent by nearly 60% of the vote to advance to the general election on November 7, 2014, where she was re-elected to her fourth term. When the new term began on December 1, 2014, Gorman was chosen as the Committee Chairperson of the Environmental Control Committee and Vice Chairperson of the Roads and Bridges Committee, Rules and Administration Committee and the Technology and Innovation Committee. Gorman is also the Chairman of the Suburban Caucus of the County board and a member of 10 additional committees: Audit; Criminal Justice; Business and Economic Development; Finance; Health and Hospitals, Homeland Security; Legislation; North Suburban METRA Nominating Committee; Northwest Suburban METRA Nominating Committee; Southwest Suburban METRA Nominating Committee and Zoning and Building.

During her time on the Cook County Board, Gorman opposed the "Hotel Occupancy Tax" and the "Food and Beverage Tax" in 2003, the 150% cigarette tax increase in 2004 and the additional 100% increase in 2006. She opposed the "Food and Beverage Tax" and the "Hotel Occupancy Tax" again in 2007, and she opposed the "Sanctuary County" resolution for illegal immigrants in 2007 and sponsored a repeal of the ordinance later that year and most recently she voted against Board President Todd Stroger's 2008 budget and opposed the increase in the Cook County sales tax.

During the 2008 Republican Party presidential primaries, Gorman ran to be a delegate to the 2008 Republican National Convention from Illinois's 13th congressional district for the presidential campaign of former Governor Mitt Romney.

On December 1, 2009, Commissioner Gorman successfully led the effort to roll back Cook County's sales tax increase and override County Board President Todd Stroger's veto, cutting the county sales tax from 1.75% to 1.25%.

== Later career ==
On February 22, 2018, Gorman was appointed as executive director of the Illinois State Toll Highway Authority. In 2021, she was appointed to the RTA board. Gorman challenged her successor and Republican incumbent Sean M. Morrison in the 2022 Republican primary for her former seat on the Cook County Board. She was defeated, 57%-43%. She is running again in 2026.

== Family ==
Gorman is an Orland Park resident where she resides with her husband Gerald and three young sons, Conor, Liam and Shane.

Political offices
Preceded by Herbert T. Schumann, Jr.	Cook County Commissioner - 17th District; 2002–present	Incumbent
Preceded by William Maher	Orland Township Republican Committeeman; 2003–present	Incumbent
Party political offices
Preceded by Gary Skoien	Cook County Republican Party Chairman; 2007-2008	Succeeded by Lee Roupas
