= Larry Suffredin =

American politician (born 1947)

Member of the Cook County Board of Commissioners from the 13th district
- In office December 2002 – December 5, 2022
- Preceded by: Calvin Sutker
- Succeeded by: Josina Morita

Personal details
- Born: October 5, 1947 (age 79) Evergreen Park, Illinois, U.S.
- Party: Democratic
- Spouse: Gloria Callaci
- Children: 2
- Education: Loyola University Chicago (BA); Georgetown University (JD)

Lawrence J. Suffredin (born October 5, 1947) is an American politician who formerly served as a member of the Cook County Board of Commissioners representing the 13th district.

== Early life and education ==
Suffredin was born October 5, 1947 in Evergreen Park, Illinois, and grew up in Westchester, Illinois. He was the first of eight children born to Lawrence J. Suffredin Sr., a World War II combat veteran, and Patricia Mulrainey Suffredin. His father worked as a Chicago policeman and then became the "Printer to South Water Market" as the owner of Chicago Produce Publishing Company which reported on the local fruit and vegetable market.

After studies at Archbishop Quigley Preparatory Seminary, he received his bachelor's degree from Loyola University Chicago in 1969 and his Juris Doctor degree from Georgetown University in 1972.

== Public service ==
Suffredin worked at the United States Department of Justice in Washington, DC 1969-1970 while in law school. He was an officer in the United States Air Force 1972-1973. He served as an Assistant Public Defender in Cook County from May 15, 1973 to June 30, 1975. He tried 32 juries to verdict as an Assistant Public Defender. He served Missouri Governor Mel Carnahan as special counsel for gaming issues and was the first executive for the new Missouri Gaming Board from 1992-1994. He served as special counsel for the City of Detroit on gaming issues. Suffredin is currently the Chairperson of the Board of Directors of Harbor Quest, Inc., a nonprofit staffing and placement services agency, and serves on the board of the Illinois Council Against Handgun Violence.

== Professional career ==
Suffredin is an attorney; he has argued before the Illinois and United States Supreme Court as well as the United States Court of Appeals and the Illinois Appellate Court. He has tried 136 juries to verdicts.

Suffredin has been in private law practice from 1975 to present, and beginning in 2002, he was elected to the County Board as well. In 2002, he won election as a Cook County Commissioner for the 13th district, of northern suburbs and two neighborhoods on the north side of Chicago. The commissioner is considered a part-time position. He won re-election in the next four elections. He announced that he will not run for re-election in the 2022 election.

Suffredin is a partner in the law firm of Shefsky & Froelich with practices in the areas of lobbying, gaming, government regulation, and securities law. Suffredin served as lead counsel in filing successful gaming applications with the Illinois Gaming Board for riverboat gaming operations. Suffredin has represented the following public entities: Cook County Forest Preserve, Chicago Transit Authority, and the Cities of Chicago, Elgin and Evanston.

Suffredin is a registered lobbyist with Cook County, the City of Chicago, and the State of Illinois. Suffredin's lobbyist clients include or have included resort and casino company MGM Mirage, owners of the Grand Victoria Casino in Elgin, Illinois, and Penn National Gaming, owners of the Hollywood Casino, Aurora, Illinois, the Illinois Alliance of Competitive Telephone Companies, the Donors Forum of Chicago, the Illinois Arts Alliance, and Illinois Citizens for Handgun Control, the Chicago Bar Association, and Kankakee Regional Landfill LLC. He is also a registered lobbyist for Abbott Laboratories, Nursepower Services Corporation, and Quest Diagnostics.

== Cook County Commissioner ==
Suffredin has served part-time as a Commissioner on the Cook County Board for the 13th district since 2002; he was re-elected four times and will not run in 2022. Suffredin is Chairperson of the Legislation and Intergovernmental Relations and Veterans Committee A committee of the whole, which recommends county positions on state and federal legislation, tracking state and federal funds earmarked for the county; reviews appointments to county boards and commissions, and reviews programs to benefit military veterans. He also serves on the Litigation, Tax and Revenue, Rules and Administration, and the Botanic Garden Committees.

On February 29, 2008 Suffredin voted for, and on July 22, 2008 voted to uphold, a historic Cook County sales tax increase, remaining the highest sales tax rate in the nation. The Chicago Tribune editorialized that Suffredin "caved to pressure from public employee unions...and he provided the winning vote for this bureaucracy-friendly tax hike" and encouraged constituents to contact Suffredin to "acknowledge the error" by co-sponsoring its repeal.

On October 11, 2017 Suffredin was one of two Commissioners voting to keep Cook County's tax on sweetened beverages. This final vote followed a 15-1 vote of the County Board's finance committee, where Suffredin was the only Commissioner voting to keep the tax.

== Personal life ==
Suffredin and his wife, Gloria Callaci, live in Evanston, Illinois, and have two adult children, Tom and Elizabeth. Tom is the alderman of the 6th Ward of Evanston.

== 2008 Cook County State's Attorney campaign ==
In February 2008, Suffredin lost to Anita Alvarez in the primary for the Democratic Party nomination for Cook County State's Attorney.
