= Roberto Maldonado =

American politician

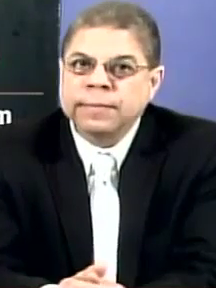

Member of the Chicago City Council from the 26th ward
- In office July 28, 2009 – May 15, 2023
- Preceded by: Billy Ocasio
- Succeeded by: Jessie Fuentes

Member of the Cook County Board of Commissioners from the 8th district
- In office December 1994 – July 2009
- Preceded by: Constituency established
- Succeeded by: Edwin Reyes

Personal details
- Born: August 28, 1951 (age 75) New York City, New York, U.S.
- Party: Democratic
- Education: University of Puerto Rico, Río Piedras (BA, MA); Loyola University Chicago

Roberto Maldonado is an American politician who served as the alderman of the 26th Ward of the City of Chicago, Illinois from 2009 to 2023.

== Early life, education, career and family ==
Maldonado earned both his undergraduate degree and master's degree from the University of Puerto Rico. After moving to Chicago, he continued his studies at Loyola University Chicago, where he pursued doctoral studies in clinical psychology.

Maldonado worked as a school psychologist and later as a research analyst for the Mayor's Commission on Latino Affairs. He was also involved in the 1986 aldermanic campaign of Luis Gutiérrez and in Gutiérrez's 1987 re-election campaign.

In 1988, Maldonado served as Director of Management Services for the Mayor's Office of Employment Training. In that role, he was the agency's chief purchasing official and oversaw an annual purchasing budget of about $1 million. According to reporting by the Chicago Sun-Times, contracts from the office were awarded to companies owned by people connected to Gutiérrez's Puerto Rican political circle, and Maldonado later sought campaign contributions for Gutiérrez from some of those vendors. Maldonado resigned from the city position days after the publication of the report.

Maldonado was married to Nancy Y. Franco Maldonado, who died of pancreatic cancer in 2016. They had three children: René, Roberto II and Raquel.

== Cook County commissioner ==
Maldonado’s election in 1994 as Cook County Commissioner made him the first Puerto Rican in the nation to serve as a county commissioner.

As a commissioner, Maldonado was the chairperson of the Stroger and Cermak Hospitals, and Law Enforcement and Corrections Committees. Additionally, he served on nine committees: Business and Economic Development, Contract Compliance, Labor, Real Estate, Department of Corrections, Health and Hospitals, Finance, Zoning and Buildings, and Roads and Bridges.

== Abandoned 2008 congressional candidacy ==
Maldonado announced in 2007 his intention to run in 2008 for the congressional seat expected to be vacated by U.S. Rep. Luis Gutiérrez (D-Ill.). He raised $230,000 before Gutiérrez decided to run again. Maldonado bowed out of the race and said he'd keep the money for a 2010 congressional bid.

== Chicago alderman ==
On July 28, 2009, Maldonado was appointed by Chicago Mayor Daley as the alderman for Chicago's 26th Ward.

As of 2009, Maldonado owned more real estate than any other alderman, owning 16 properties (including ten in the 26th Ward) according to financial disclosure statements.

In 2013, Maldonado generated controversy through his efforts to convert Ames Middle School into a Marines academy. The school board ultimately approved the proposal despite significant local opposition.

In 2015, despite majority local support of the Riot Fest music festival, Maldonado vocally opposed allowing the event to continue using Humboldt Park. The festival ultimately relocated to North Lawndale.

In 2017, a video surfaced of Maldonado confronting police officers at a crime scene in his neighborhood, and attempting to use his status as an alderman to have police allow him to drive through an active crime scene. In the video, the alderman's response to the officers not allowing him to drive through the crime scene was “You know what? This why the Police Department in such bad shape with the citizens.” Maldonado later filed a complaint accusing the officers of "rude and discourteous" behavior towards him.

In 2019, he was selected as the chairman of the Council's Latino Caucus by his fellow caucus members.

In January 2023, the month before the first round of the 2023 Chicago aldermanic election, Maldonado withdrew his candidacy for reelection.

== Electoral history ==
=== Cook County Board of Commissioners elections ===
1994 Cook County Board of Commissioners 8th district election
Party	Candidate	Votes	%
Democratic	Roberto Maldonado (incumbent)		
Total votes			100

1998 Cook County Board of Commissioners 8th district Democratic primary
Party	Candidate	Votes	%
Democratic	Roberto Maldonado (incumbent)	12,619	64.97
Democratic	Francisco Duprey	6,803	35.03
Total votes		19,422	100

1998 Cook County Board of Commissioners 8th district election
Party	Candidate	Votes	%
Democratic	Roberto Maldonado (incumbent)	31,356	100
Total votes		31,356	100

2002 Cook County Board of Commissioners 8th district Democratic primary
Party	Candidate	Votes	%
Democratic	Roberto Maldonado (incumbent)	26,514	100
Total votes		26,514	100

2002 Cook County Board of Commissioners 8th district election
Party	Candidate	Votes	%
Democratic	Roberto Maldonado (incumbent)	38,741	100
Total votes		38,741	100

2006 Cook County Board of Commissioners 8th district Democratic primary
Party	Candidate	Votes	%
Democratic	Roberto Maldonado (incumbent)	18,409	100
Total votes		18,409	100

2006 Cook County Board of Commissioners 8th district election
Party	Candidate	Votes	%
Democratic	Roberto Maldonado (incumbent)	38,795	100
Total votes		38,795	100

=== Aldermanic elections ===
2011 Chicago 26th ward aldermanic election
Party	Candidate	Votes	%
Nonpartisan	Roberto Maldonado (incumbent)	6,126	82.36
Nonpartisan	Devon Reid	1,312	17.64
Total votes		7,438	100

2015 Chicago 26th ward aldermanic election
Party	Candidate	Votes	%
Nonpartisan	Roberto Maldonado (incumbent)	3,466	52.25
Nonpartisan	Juanita Irizarry	2,248	33.89
Nonpartisan	Adam Corona	919	13.85
Total votes		6,633	100

2019 Chicago 26th ward aldermanic election
Party	Candidate	Votes	%
Nonpartisan	Roberto Maldonado (incumbent)	4,431	50.53
Nonpartisan	Theresa Siaw	2,462	28.13
Nonpartisan	David Herrera	1,866	21.28
Write-in	Mirko "Limo Mike Z" Zaplatic, Jr	5	0.06
Total votes		8,764	100
