= Earlean Collins =

American politician

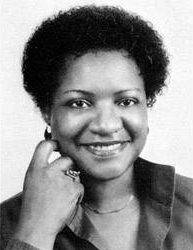
- official portrait, circa 1981

Member of the Cook County Board of Commissioners from the 1st district
- In office December 1998 – December 2014
- Preceded by: Darlena Williams-Burnett
- Succeeded by: Richard Boykin

Illinois State Senator
- In office 1976–1998
- Succeeded by: Kimberly Lightford

Personal details
- Born: September 4, 1937 (age 89) Rolling Fork, Mississippi, U.S.
- Party: Democratic
- Education: University of Illinois Chicago
- Profession: Attorney

Earlean Collins (born September 4, 1937) is an American politician. In 1976, Collins became the first African-American woman elected to the Illinois Senate, where she rose to leadership positions. In 1994, she was the Democratic Party candidate for comptroller of Illinois.

Collins left the Illinois Senate to run for the Cook County Board of Commissioners in the 1998 election. From 1998 to 2014, she was the member of the County Board from the 1st district, representing an area that included the Humboldt Park, West Garfield Park, Austin and Montclare areas of the City of Chicago as well as the surrounding suburbs of Oak Park, Forest Park, Maywood, Broadview, Westchester, Bellwood and Hillside.

== Early life ==
Collins was born in Rolling Fork, Mississippi as one of fourteen children, and moved to Chicago, Illinois. She was married to Otis G. Collins who also served in the Illinois General Assembly. They separated and Collins then remarried. Collins was a graduate of the University of Illinois Chicago.

== Public service ==
Before her election as a commissioner, Collins served as Assistant Minority Leader in the Illinois Senate and an Assistant Administrator of Children and Family Services. Collins was the first African-American woman elected to the Illinois Senate.

In 1994, she ran for Illinois Comptroller. After narrowly prevailing in the Democratic primary against Kane County Coroner Mary Lou Kearns, she was defeated in the general election by Republican Loleta Didrickson.

== Cook County Commissioner ==
Collins was elected to the 1st district of the Cook County Board of Commissioners in 1998, and was reelected in 2002, 2006, and 2010. She did not seek reelection in 2014.

As a Cook County Commissioner, Collins is Chairperson of the Business and Economic Development, Public Health, and Family Court and Juvenile Detention Center Committees. Additionally, Collins is a member of nine committees: Construction, Litigation, Tax Delinquency, Legislation and Intergovernmental Relations, Rules, Health and Hospitals, Finance, Zoning and Building, and Roads and Bridges.

Her top issues are improving conditions for the mentally ill in Cook County Jail and improving community-based mental health treatment. She also wants to increase affordable housing in the county and to train people to repair houses.

As Cook County Board Commissioner, Collins voted to uphold a historic 2008 Cook County sales tax increase, remaining the highest in the nation. As a result, the Chicago Tribune has encouraged voters to vote against her in the 2010 elections.

Party political offices
Preceded by Dawn Clark Netsch	Democratic nominee for Illinois Comptroller; 1994	Succeeded by Daniel Hynes
