= Peter N. Silvestri =

American lawyer

Peter Silvestri

Member of the Cook County Board of Commissioners from the 9th district
- In office December 1994 – December 5, 2022
- Preceded by: Constituency established
- Succeeded by: Maggie Trevor

Elmwood Park, Illinois Village President
- In office 1989–2013
- Preceded by: Richard G. Torpe
- Succeeded by: Angelo "Skip" Saviano

Personal details
- Born: January 12, 1957 (age 69) Brantford, Canada
- Party: Republican
- Education: DePaul University (B.A.); DePaul College of Law (J.D.)
- Profession: Attorney; Politician

Peter N. Silvestri (born January 12, 1957) is a Canadian-American attorney and politician who served as a member of the Cook County Board of Commissioners from the 9th district, which includes the Norwood Park and Dunning areas of the City of Chicago as well as the surrounding suburbs of Des Plaines, Elmwood Park, Harwood Heights, Morton Grove, Mount Prospect, Niles, Norridge, Park Ridge, River Forest, River Grove, Rosemont and Schiller Park. He was also the village president (mayor) of Elmwood Park, Illinois from 1989 to 2013.

In January 2022, Silvestri announced his retirement from the Cook County Board of Commissioners.

== Early life and education ==
Silvestri was born in Brantford, Canada. As a child, Silvestri lived with his parents in Chicago. Silvestri has lived in Elmwood Park since 1971, and is a graduate of Elmwood Park High School. He earned a Bachelor of Arts degree from DePaul University and a Juris Doctor from the DePaul University College of Law.

== Career ==
In 1977, at the age of twenty, Silvestri became the then-youngest person in Illinois elected to a local school board when he won a seat on the Elmwood Park Community Unit School District 401. He served on that board for two years, and was president of the board when he left to serve in other offices. Following Silvestri's exit from the school board, he served on the Zoning Board, Plan Commission, Civic Foundation, and as village trustee before his election to village president.

=== Village president of Elmwood Park ===
Silvestri succeeded Richard G. Torpe as Village President, defeating Jo Ann Serpico and Jeanne Ohr. While village president, Silvestri oversaw numerous beautification projects in the village, as well as efforts to modernize the police, fire, and public works departments. Silvestri also holds a good financial track record with the village, which is seen through the village's high bond rating, minimal debt and a reduced tax levy during his final year. Other accomplishments while in office include an expanded recreation center, the creation of Mills, Torpe and Central Parks and an expanded Bambi Park.

=== Cook County Commissioner ===
In 1993, the Cook County Board of Commissioners announced a move from two multi-member districts that elect ten members from Chicago and seven from the suburbs to seventeen single member districts. Silvestri was first elected to the Cook County Board of Commissioners in November 1994 over Commissioner Marco Domico who had been elected as part of the at-large election in 1990. As a member of the Cook County Board of Commissioners he served at one time as the chair for the Finance-Litigation and Zoning & Building committees as well as the vice chair of the committees for Contract Compliance, Human Relations and Law Enforcement as well as a member of the committees for Capital Improvements, Environmental Control, Rules & Administration and Technology. Additionally, like all commissioners, he was a member of the board for the Forest Preserve District of Cook County which is responsible for the management of 68,000 acres of forest preserves.

Silvestri had a reputation of being a peacemaker on the Board when tensions would arise between its members.

By the 2010s, the county board had only a small number of remaining Republican commissioners. This group formed an occasional opposition bloc that voted against the position preferred by County Board President Toni Preckwinkle on select matters, particularly on matters related to taxes and budgets. Nevertheless, very few votes by the county board saw any division. As a political centrist, Silvestri often voted for the positions supported by Toni Preckwinkle and her floor leader, Chuy García. Silvestri voted for the positions of Preckwinkle and García more frequently than his Republican colleagues on the Board. From 2014 through 2017, there were even four Democratic members of the Board that voted against Preckwinkle and García's positions at a greater frequency than Silvestri. Due to his popularity with his constituents and his moderate politics, in the 2018 elections, Silvestri was the only Republican incumbent that County Board President Preckwinkle did not make an effort to have a Democratic challenger unseat.

In January 2022, Silvestri announced his retirement from the Cook County Board of Commissioners.
