= 2026 Cook County Board of Commissioners election =

- November 3, 2026

All 17 seats on the Cook County Board of Commissioners 9 seats needed for a majority
	First party	Second party
Party	Democratic	Republican
Seats before	16	1
Seats after	17	0
Seat change	▲1	▼1
Popular vote	1,151,134	168,100
Percentage	87.25%	12.74%
Swing	▲12.37%	▼10.36%
- Results: Democratic gain Democratic hold Vote Share: 50–60% 60–70% 70–80% 80–90% >90%

The 2026 Cook County Board of Commissioners election saw all seventeen seats of the Cook County Board of Commissioners up for election to four-year terms. The election coinsides with other 2026 Cook County, Illinois, elections (including an election for the president of the Board of Commissioners) with the primary elections held on March 17, 2026, and the general election held on November 3, 2026.

The Republican Party ran nominees for only 8 of the 17 Board of Commissioners districts. Sean Morrison, the board's only Republican member, did not seek re-election. Democrats ultimately won all seats.

== 1st district ==
Incumbent 1st district commissioner Tara Stamps, a Democrat who was first appointed in 2023, is seeking re-election to a second full term.

=== Democratic primary ===
==== Candidates ====
===== Declared =====
- Tara Stamps, incumbent commissioner

==== Endorsements ====
Tara Stamps

Labor unions

- Chicago Federation of Labor
- Chicago Teachers Union
- Cook County College Teachers Union Local 1600
- International Union of Operating Engineers Locals 150 and 399
- Plumbers Local 130
- SEIU Healthcare
- SEIU Illinois State Council

Newspapers

- The Chicago Crusader

==== Results ====
2026 Cook County Board of Commissioners 1st district Democratic primary
Party	Candidate	Votes	%
Democratic	Tara Stamps (incumbent)		
Total votes			100

=== General election ===
2026 Cook County Board of Commissioners 1st district election
Party	Candidate	Votes	%
Democratic	Tara Stamps (incumbent)	76,629	100
Total votes		76,629	100

== 2nd district ==
The incumbent 2nd district commissioner Michael Scott Jr., a Democrat who was first appointed in 2024, is seeking re-election to a second full term.

=== Democratic primary ===
==== Candidates ====
- Michael Scott Jr., incumbent commissioner
- Andre Smith, activist, perennial candidate, and candidate for this district in 2022

==== Endorsements ====
Michael Scott Jr.

Labor unions

- American Federation of State, County and Municipal Employees Council 31
- Chicago Federation of Labor
- International Union of Operating Engineers Locals 150 and 399
- Plumbers Local 130
- SEIU Healthcare
- SEIU Illinois State Council

Organizations

- Citizen Action Illinois

Newspapers

- Chicago Tribune
Andre Smith

Newspapers

- The Chicago Crusader

==== Results ====
2026 Cook County Board of Commissioners 2nd district Democratic primary
Party	Candidate	Votes	%
Democratic	Michael Scott Jr. (incumbent)		
Democratic	Andre Smith		
Total votes			100

=== General election ===
2026 Cook County Board of Commissioners 2nd district election
Party	Candidate	Votes	%
Democratic	Michael Scott Jr. (incumbent)	57,516	100
Total votes		57,516	100

== 3rd district ==
Incumbent 3rd district commissioner Bill Lowry, a Democrat, is running for re-election. No candidate filed to run against him in the Democratic primary, while no candidate filed for the Republican primary, meaning he will be unopposed in the general election.

=== Democratic primary ===
==== Candidates ====
- Bill Lowry, incumbent commissioner

==== Endorsements ====
Bill Lowry

Labor unions

- Chicago Federation of Labor
- Chicago Teachers Union
- International Union of Operating Engineers Locals 150 and 399
- Plumbers Local 130
- SEIU Healthcare
- SEIU Illinois State Council

Organizations

- Citizen Action Illinois
- Sierra Club Illinois

Newspapers

- The Chicago Crusader

==== Results ====
2026 Cook County Board of Commissioners 3rd district Democratic primary
Party	Candidate	Votes	%
Democratic	Bill Lowry (incumbent)		
Total votes			100.0

=== General election ===
2026 Cook County Board of Commissioners 3rd district election
Party	Candidate	Votes	%
Democratic	Bill Lowry (incumbent)	75,713	100
Total votes		75,713	100

== 4th district ==
The incumbent 4th district commissioner Stanley Moore, a Democrat, is seeking re-election to a fourth full term.

=== Democratic primary ===
==== Candidates ====
- Stanley Moore, incumbent commissioner

==== Endorsements ====
Stanley Moore

Labor unions

- Chicago Federation of Labor
- International Union of Operating Engineers Locals 150 and 399
- Plumbers Local 130
- SEIU Healthcare
- SEIU Illinois State Council

Organizations

- Citizen Action Illinois

Newspapers

- The Chicago Crusader

==== Results ====
2026 Cook County Board of Commissioners 4th district Democratic primary
Party	Candidate	Votes	%
Democratic	Stanley S. Moore (incumbent)		
Total votes			100

=== General election ===
2026 Cook County Board of Commissioners 4th district election
Party	Candidate	Votes	%
Democratic	Stanley S. Moore (incumbent)	74,980	100
Total votes		74,980	100

== 5th district ==
The incumbent 5th district commissioner Kisha McCaskill, a Democrat who was first appointed in 2025, is seeking re-election to her first full term.

=== Democratic primary ===
==== Candidates ====
- Kiana Belcher, Dolton trustee
- Kisha McCaskill, incumbent commissioner

==== Endorsements ====
Kiana Belcher

U.S. representatives

- Robin Kelly, IL-02 (2013–present)

State legislators

- Will Davis, state representative from the 30th district (2003–present)

Labor unions

- SEIU Healthcare
- SEIU Illinois State Council

Organizations

- Sierra Club Illinois
Kisha McCaskill

State legislators

- Napoleon Harris, state senator from the 15th district (2013–present) and supervisor of Thornton Township (2025–present)
- Debbie Meyers-Martin, state representative from the 38th district (2019–present)
- Bob Rita, state representative from 28th district (2003–present)
- Justin Slaughter, state representative from the 27th district (2017–present)
- Chris Welch, speaker of the Illinois House of Representatives (2021–present) from the 7th district (2013–present)

Local officials

- Anthony Beale, Chicago alder from the 9th ward (1999–present)
- Howard Brookins, former Chicago alder from the 21st ward (2003–2023)
- Peter Chico, Chicago alder from the 10th ward (2023–present)
- Ronnie Mosley, Chicago alder from the 21st ward (2023–present)
- Toni Preckwinkle, President of the Cook County Board of Commissioners (2010–present)
- Deborah Sims, former Cook County commissioner from the 5th district (1994–2022)

Labor unions

- American Federation of State, County and Municipal Employees Council 31
- Chicago Federation of Labor
- Chicago Fire Fighters Union Local 2
- International Brotherhood of Electrical Workers Local 134
- International Union of Operating Engineers Locals 150 and 399
- Plumbers Local 130

Newspapers

- The Chicago Crusader
- Chicago Tribune

==== Results ====
2026 Cook County Board of Commissioners 5th district Democratic primary
Party	Candidate	Votes	%
Democratic	Kisha McCaskill (incumbent)		
Democratic	Kiana Belcher		
Total votes			100

=== Republican primary ===
==== Candidates ====
- Richard Nolan, former Riverdale trustee

==== Results ====
2026 Cook County Board of Commissioners 5th district Republican primary
Party	Candidate	Votes	%
Republican	Richard Nolan		
Total votes			100

2026 Cook County Board of Commissioners 5th district election
Party	Candidate	Votes	%
Democratic	Kisha McCaskill (incumbent)	69,369	89.87
Republican	Richard Nolan	7,817	10.13
Total votes		77,186	100

== 6th district ==
Incumbent 6th district commissioner Donna Miller, a Democrat, is retiring to run for Congress.

=== Democratic primary ===
==== Candidates ====
- Antoine Bass, realtor
- Veronica Bolling-Franklin, Elementary School District 159 school board member
- Sylvester Fulcher, senior administrator to the Illinois Department of Children and Family Services
- Patricia Joan Murphy, Worth Township supervisor, daughter of former Cook County commissioner Joan Patricia Murphy, and candidate for this district in 2018
- Wesam Shahed, former prosecutor

===== Declined =====
- Donna Miller, incumbent commissioner (running for U.S. House)

==== Endorsements ====
Patricia Joan Murphy

Statewide officials

- Alexi Giannoulias, Illinois Secretary of State (2023–present)

Local officials

- Frank Aguilar, Cook County commissioner from the 16th district (2020–present)
- John Daley, Cook County commissioner from the 11th district (1992–present)
- Tom Dart, Cook County Sheriff (2006–present)
- Monica Gordon, Cook County Clerk (2024–present)
- Kisha McCaskill, Cook County commissioner from the 5th district (2025–present)
- Stanley Moore, Cook County commissioner from the 4th district (2013–present)
- Josina Morita, Cook County commissioner from the 13th district (2022–present)
- Kevin Morrison, Cook County commissioner from the 15th district (2018–present)
- Mariyana Spyropoulos, Clerk of the Circuit Court of Cook County (2024–present)

Labor unions

- Chicago Federation of Labor
- Chicago Fraternal Order of Police
- Cook County College Teachers Union Local 1600
- International Union of Operating Engineers Locals 150 and 399
- Plumbers Local 130

Newspapers

- Chicago Tribune
Wesam Shahed

U.S. representatives

- Chuy García, IL-04 (2019–present)
- Robin Kelly, IL-02 (2013–present)

Statewide officials

- Kwame Raoul, Illinois Attorney General (2019–present)
- Jesse White, former Illinois Secretary of State (1999–2023)

Local officials

- Alma Anaya, Cook County commissioner from the 7th district (2018–present)
- Jessica Vasquez, Cook County commissioner from the 8th district (2025–present)

Labor unions

- American Federation of State, County and Municipal Employees Council 31
- American Postal Workers Union Local 604-605
- Brotherhood of Locomotive Engineers and Trainmen
- Brotherhood of Railroad Signalmen
- Dolton Firefighters Local 3766
- International Association of Machinists and Aerospace Workers
- National Association of Letter Carriers Branch 4016
- SEIU Healthcare
- SEIU Illinois State Council
- Teamsters Local 700

Organizations

- Citizen Action Illinois
- Sierra Club Illinois

==== Results ====
2026 Cook County Board of Commissioners 6th district Democratic primary
Party	Candidate	Votes	%
Democratic	Patricia Joan "Tish" Murphy		
Democratic	Antoine Bass		
Democratic	Veronica Bolling-Franklin		
Democratic	Sylvester Fulcher		
Democratic	Wesam Shahed		
Total votes			100

=== General election ===
2026 Cook County Board of Commissioners 6th district election
Party	Candidate	Votes	%
Democratic	Patricia Joan "Tish"	70,600	100
Total votes		70,600	100

== 7th district ==
Incumbent 7th district commissioner Alma Anaya, a Democrat, is running for re-election to a third term.

=== Democratic primary ===
==== Candidates ====
- Alma Anaya, incumbent commissioner

==== Endorsements ====
Alma Anaya

Labor unions

- Chicago Federation of Labor
- Chicago Teachers Union
- Cook County College Teachers Union Local 1600
- International Union of Operating Engineers Locals 150 and 399
- Plumbers Local 130
- SEIU Healthcare
- SEIU Illinois State Council

Organizations

- Citizen Action Illinois
- Sierra Club Illinois

==== Results ====
2026 Cook County Board of Commissioners 7th district Democratic primary
Party	Candidate	Votes	%
Democratic	Alma E. Anaya (incumbent)		
Total votes			100

=== General election ===
2026 Cook County Board of Commissioners 7th district election
Party	Candidate	Votes	%
Democratic	Alma E. Anaya (incumbent)	40,917	100
Total votes		40,917	100

== 8th district ==
Incumbent 8th district commissioner Jessica Vasquez, a Democrat who was first appointed in 2025, is seeking re-election to her first full term.

=== Democratic primary ===
==== Candidates ====
- Nicholas Cade, U.S. Navy veteran
- Jessica Vasquez, incumbent commissioner

==== Endorsements ====
Nicholas Cade

Organizations

- VoteVets
Jessica Vasquez

Labor unions

- American Federation of State, County and Municipal Employees Council 31
- Chicago Federation of Labor
- Chicago Teachers Union
- Cook County College Teachers Union Local 1600
- International Union of Operating Engineers Locals 150 and 399
- Plumbers Local 130
- SEIU Healthcare
- SEIU Illinois State Council

Organizations

- Citizen Action Illinois
- Run for Something
- Sierra Club Illinois

Newspapers

- Chicago Tribune

==== Results ====
2026 Cook County Board of Commissioners 8th district Democratic primary
Party	Candidate	Votes	%
Democratic	Jessica Vasquez (incumbent)		
Democratic	Nicholas Cade		
Total votes			100

=== General election ===
2026 Cook County Board of Commissioners 8th district election
Party	Candidate	Votes	%
Democratic	Jessica Vasquez (incumbent)	61,332	88.28
Republican	Ramona Bonilla-Anaiel	8,140	11.72
Total votes		69,472	100

== 9th district ==
Incumbent 9th district commissioner Maggie Trevor, a Democrat, is running for re-election to a third term.

=== Democratic primary ===
==== Candidates ====
- Maggie Trevor, incumbent commissioner

==== Endorsements ====
Maggie Trevor

Labor unions

- Chicago Federation of Labor
- International Union of Operating Engineers Locals 150 and 399
- Plumbers Local 130
- SEIU Healthcare
- SEIU Illinois State Council

Organizations

- Citizen Action Illinois
- Equality Illinois

==== Results ====
2026 Cook County Board of Commissioners 9th district Democratic primary
Party	Candidate	Votes	%
Democratic	Maggie Trevor (incumbent)		
Total votes			100

=== Republican primary ===
==== Candidates ====
- Ammie Kessem, police officer and nominee for Illinois's 19th house district in 2018

==== Results ====
2026 Cook County Board of Commissioners 9th district Republican primary
Party	Candidate	Votes	%
Republican	Ammie Kessem		
Total votes			100

=== General election ===
2026 Cook County Board of Commissioners 9th district election
Party	Candidate	Votes	%
Democratic	Maggie Trevor (incumbent)	65,045	63.89
Republican	Jon Luers	36,767	36.11
Total votes		101,812	100

== 10th district ==
Incumbent 10th district commissioner Bridget Gainer, a Democrat, is seeking re-election to a fourth full term.

=== Democratic primary ===
==== Candidates ====
- Bridget Gainer, incumbent commissioner
- Drake Warren, engineer

==== Endorsements ====
Bridget Gainer

Labor unions

- Chicago Federation of Labor
- International Union of Operating Engineers Locals 150 and 399
- Plumbers Local 130
- SEIU Healthcare
- SEIU Illinois State Council

Newspapers

- The Chicago Crusader
- Chicago Tribune
Drake Warren

Local officials

- James Cappleman, former Chicago alder from the 46th ward (2011–2023)
- Leni Manaa-Hoppenworth, Chicago alder from the 48th ward (2023–present)
- Dick Simpson, former Chicago alder from the 44th ward (1971–1979)

Organizations

- Equality Illinois
- Sierra Club Illinois

==== Results ====
2026 Cook County Board of Commissioners 10th district Democratic primary
Party	Candidate	Votes	%
Democratic	Drake Warren	31,718	56.3
Democratic	Bridget Gainer (incumbent)	24,604	43.7
Total votes			100

=== General election ===
2026 Cook County Board of Commissioners 10th district election
Party	Candidate	Votes	%
Democratic	Drake Warren	95,389	100
Total votes		95,389	100

== 11th district ==
Incumbent 11th district commissioner John Daley, a Democrat, won re-election to an eighth full term.

=== Democratic primary ===
==== Candidates ====
- John Daley, incumbent commissioner

==== Endorsements ====
John Daley

Labor unions

- Chicago Federation of Labor
- Chicago Teachers Union
- International Union of Operating Engineers Locals 150 and 399
- Plumbers Local 130

==== Results ====
2026 Cook County Board of Commissioners 11th district Democratic primary
Party	Candidate	Votes	%
Democratic	John P. Daley (incumbent)		
Total votes			100

=== General election ===
2026 Cook County Board of Commissioners 11th district election
Party	Candidate	Votes	%
Democratic	John P. Daley (incumbent)	53,189	74.51
Republican	Charles Spizzirri	18,194	25.49
Total votes		71,383	100

== 12th district ==
Incumbent 12th district commissioner Bridget Degnen, a Democrat is retiring.

=== Democratic primary ===
==== Candidates ====
- Elizabeth Granato, bureau chief of the Cook County Bureau of Asset Management and wife of state senator Ram Villivalam
- Isaiah White, teacher
- Che-Che Wilson, director of civic engagement for Equality Illinois

===== Withdrawn =====
- Cat Sharp, chief of staff to Chicago alder Andre Vasquez

===== Declined =====
- Bridget Degnen, incumbent commissioner (endorsed Sharp)

==== Endorsements ====
Elizabeth Granato

U.S. representatives

- Chuy García, IL-04 (2019–present)
- Raja Krishnamoorthi, IL-08 (2017–present)
- Mike Quigley, IL-05 (2009–present)
- Delia Ramirez, IL-03 (2023–present)
- Jan Schakowsky, IL-09 (1993–present)

State legislators

- Omar Aquino, state senator from the 2nd district (2016–present)
- John D'Amico, former state representative from the 15th district (2004–2021)
- Mattie Hunter, state senator from the 3rd district (2003–present)
- Michael Kelly, state representative from the 15th district (2021–present)
- Robert Martwick, state senator from the 10th district (2019–present)
- Kevin Olickal, state representative from the 16th district (2023–present)
- Robert Peters, state senator from the 13th district (2019–present)
- Ram Villivalam, state senator from the 8th district (2019–present) (candidate's husband)

Local officials

- Scott R. Britton, Cook County commissioner from the 12th district (2018–present)
- Daniel La Spata, Chicago alder from the 1st ward (2019–present)
- Bill Lowry, Cook County commissioner from the 3rd district (2018–present)
- Stanley Moore, Cook County commissioner from the 4th district (2013–present)
- Josina Morita, Cook County commissioner from the 13th district (2022–present)
- Samantha Nugent, president pro tempore of the Chicago City Council (2023–present) from the 39th ward (2019–present)
- Ameya Pawar, former Chicago alder from the 47th ward (2011–2019)

Labor unions

- Amalgamated Transit Union Local 241
- Bricklayers and Allied Craftworkers Administrative District Council 1
- Brotherhood of Locomotive Engineers and Trainmen Illinois State Legislative Board
- Brotherhood of Maintenance of Way Employes
- Brotherhood of Railroad Signalmen
- Chicago Federation of Labor
- Chicago Fire Fighters Union Local 2
- Cook County College Teachers Union Local 1600
- Heat and Frost Insulators Local 17
- International Association of Machinists
- International Association of Sheet Metal, Air, Rail and Transportation Workers - Transportation Division
- International Brotherhood of Electrical Workers Local 9
- International Union of Operating Engineers Locals 150 and 399
- Ironworkers District Council of Chicago and Vicinity
- Mid-America Carpenters Regional Council
- Plumbers Local 130
- SEIU Healthcare
- SEIU Illinois State Council
- Teamsters Local 700

Organizations

- Citizen Action Illinois
- Sierra Club Illinois

Newspapers

- Chicago Tribune
Che-Che Wilson

State legislators

- Lakesia Collins, state senator from the 5th district (2023–present)

Local officials

- Timmy Knudsen, Chicago alder from the 43rd ward (2022–present)
- Bennett Lawson, Chicago alder from the 44th ward (2023–present)
- Michele Smith, former Chicago alder from the 43rd ward (2011–2022)
- Scott Waguespack, Chicago alder from the 32nd ward (2007–present) (previously endorsed Sharp)

Organizations

- Equality Illinois (candidate's employer)
- LGBTQ Victory Fund
- Run for Something (previously endorsed Sharp)
Cat Sharp (withdrawn)

State legislators

- Lindsey LaPointe, state representative from the 19th district (2019–present)

Local officials

- Bridget Degnen, Cook County commissioner from the 12th district (2018–present)
- Brian Hopkins, Chicago alder from the 2nd ward (2015–present)
- Timmy Knudsen, Chicago alder from the 43rd ward (2022–present)
- David Orr, former Cook County Clerk (1990–2018)
- Andre Vasquez, Chicago alder from the 40th ward (2019–present)
- ~~Scott Waguespack, Chicago alder from the 32nd ward (2007–present)~~ (switched endorsement to Wilson after Sharp withdrew)

Organizations

- ~~Run for Something~~ (switched endorsement to Wilson after Sharp withdrew)

==== Results ====
2026 Cook County Board of Commissioners 12th district Democratic primary
Party	Candidate	Votes	%
Democratic	Elizabeth Granato		
Democratic	Isaiah White		
Democratic	Che-Che Wilson		
Total votes			100

=== Republican primary ===
==== Candidates ====
- Alice Hu, small business owner and nominee for this district in 2022

==== Results ====
2026 Cook County Board of Commissioners 12th district Republican primary
Party	Candidate	Votes	%
Republican	Xiaoli "Alice" Hu		
Total votes			100

=== General election ===
2026 Cook County Board of Commissioners 12th district election
Party	Candidate	Votes	%
Democratic	Elizabeth Granato	79,193	84.84
Republican	Xiaoli "Alice" Hu	14,151	15.16
Total votes		93,344	100

== 13th district ==
Incumbent 13th district commissioner Josina Morita, a Democrat, is running for re-election to a second term.

=== Democratic primary ===
==== Candidates ====
- Josina Morita, incumbent commissioner

==== Endorsements ====
Josina Morita

Labor unions

- Chicago Federation of Labor
- Chicago Teachers Union
- International Union of Operating Engineers Locals 150 and 399
- Plumbers Local 130
- SEIU Healthcare
- SEIU Illinois State Council

Organizations

- Sierra Club Illinois

==== Results ====
2026 Cook County Board of Commissioners 13th district Democratic primary
Party	Candidate	Votes	%
Democratic	Josina Morita (incumbent)		
Total votes			100

=== General election ===
2026 Cook County Board of Commissioners 13th district election
Party	Candidate	Votes	%
Democratic	Josina Morita (incumbent)	78,176	85.29
Republican	Aasi Siddique	13,483	14.71
Total votes		91,659	100

== 14th district ==
Incumbent 14th district commissioner Scott Britton, a Democrat, is running for re-election to a third term.

=== Democratic primary ===
==== Candidates ====
- Scott R. Britton, incumbent commissioner

==== Endorsements ====
Scott Britton

Labor unions

- Chicago Federation of Labor
- International Union of Operating Engineers Locals 150 and 399
- Plumbers Local 130

Organizations

- Citizen Action Illinois
- New Trier Democrats

==== Results ====
2026 Cook County Board of Commissioners 14th district Democratic primary
Party	Candidate	Votes	%
Democratic	Scott R. Britton (incumbent)		
Total votes			100

=== General election ===
2026 Cook County Board of Commissioners 14th district election
Party	Candidate	Votes	%
Democratic	Scott R. Britton (incumbent)	81,103	100
Total votes		81,103	100

== 15th district ==
Incumbent 15th district commissioner Kevin Morrison, a Democrat, is retiring to run for Congress.

=== Democratic primary ===
==== Candidates ====
- Ted Mason, chief of staff to Cook County commissioner Kevin Morrison

===== Declined =====
- Kevin B. Morrison, incumbent commissioner (running for U.S. House, endorsed Mason)

==== Endorsements ====
Ted Mason

U.S. representatives

- Raja Krishnamoorthi, IL-08 (2017–present)
- Mike Quigley, IL-05 (2009–present)
- Delia Ramirez, IL-03 (2023–present)
- Jan Schakowsky, IL-09 (1993–present)

Statewide officials

- Mike Frerichs, Illinois Treasurer (2015–present)

State legislators

- Laura Murphy, state senator from the 28th district (2015–present)

Local officials

- Kevin Morrison, Cook County commissioner from the 15th district (2018–present)
- Toni Preckwinkle, President of the Cook County Board of Commissioners (2010–present)

Labor unions

- Chicago Federation of Labor
- Cook County College Teachers Union Local 1600
- International Union of Operating Engineers Locals 150 and 399
- Plumbers Local 130
- SEIU Healthcare
- SEIU Illinois State Council

Organizations

- Citizen Action Illinois
- Sierra Club Illinois

==== Results ====
2026 Cook County Board of Commissioners 15th district Democratic primary
Party	Candidate	Votes	%
Democratic	Ted Mason		
Total votes			100

=== Republican primary ===
==== Candidates ====
===== Declared =====
- Gabriella Hoxie, vice chair of the North Cook Young Republicans
- Daniel Lee, small business owner

==== Endorsements ====
Gabriella Hoxie

Newspapers

- Chicago Tribune
- Daily Herald

==== Results ====
2026 Cook County Board of Commissioners 15th district Republican primary
Party	Candidate	Votes	%
Republican	Daniel Lee		
Republican	Gabriella Hoxie		
Total votes			100

=== General election ===
2026 Cook County Board of Commissioners 15th district election
Party	Candidate	Votes	%
Democratic	Ted Mason	53,480	66.89
Republican	Daniel Lee	26,475	33.11
Total votes		79,955	100

== 16th district ==
Incumbent 16th district commissioner Frank Aguilar, a Democrat, is running for a second full term.

=== Democratic primary ===
==== Candidates ====
- Frank Aguilar, incumbent commissioner
- Letty Garcia, nurse, and candidate for this district in 2022
- Miranda Hernandez, attorney and daughter of state representative and Democratic Party of Illinois chair Elizabeth Hernandez

==== Endorsements ====
Frank Aguilar

U.S. representatives

- Luis Gutiérrez, former IL-04 (1993–2019)

Local officials

- Scott Britton, Cook County commissioner from the 14th district (2018–present)
- John Daley, Cook County commissioner from the 11th district (1992–present)
- Bridget Degnen, Cook County commissioner from the 12th district (2018–present)
- Bridget Gainer, Cook County commissioner from the 10th district (2009–present)
- Bill Lowry, Cook County commissioner from the 3rd district (2018–present)
- Kisha McCaskill, Cook County commissioner from the 5th district (2025–present)
- Donna Miller, Cook County commissioner from the 6th district (2018–present)
- Stanley Moore, Cook County commissioner from the 4th district (2013–present)
- Kevin Morrison, Cook County commissioner from the 15th district (2018–present)
- Toni Preckwinkle, president of the Cook County Board of Commissioners (2010–present)
- Michael Scott Jr., Cook County commissioner from the 2nd district (2024–present)
- Mariyana Spyropoulos, Clerk of the Circuit Court of Cook County (2024–present)
- Tara Stamps, Cook County commissioner from the 1st district (2023–present)
- Maggie Trevor, Cook County commissioner from the 9th district (2022–present)

Labor unions

- American Federation of State, County and Municipal Employees Council 31
- Chicago Teachers Union
- International Brotherhood of Electrical Workers Local 134
- International Brotherhood of Teamsters Local 700
- International Union of Painters and Allied Trades District Council 14
- Ironworkers Local 63
- SEIU Healthcare
- SEIU Illinois State Council
- Service Employees International Union Local 1
- Sprinkler Fitters Local 281

Organizations

- Arab American Chamber of Commerce
- Citizen Action Illinois
Miranda Hernandez

U.S. senator

- Cory Booker, New Jersey (2013–present)

State legislators

- Steven Landek, state senator from the 12th district (2011–2023)
- Michael Zalewski, former state representative from 23rd district (2008–2023)

Labor unions

- Chicago Federation of Labor
- International Union of Operating Engineers Locals 150 and 399
- Plumbers Local 130

Organizations

- Sierra Club Illinois

Newspapers

- Chicago Tribune

==== Results ====
2026 Cook County Board of Commissioners 16th district Democratic primary
Party	Candidate	Votes	%
Democratic	Miranda Hernandez		
Democratic	Frank Aguilar (incumbent)		
Democratic	Letty Garcia		
Total votes			100

=== General election ===
2026 Cook County Board of Commissioners 16th district election
Party	Candidate	Votes	%
Democratic	Miranda Hernandez	59,731	100
Total votes		59,731	100

== 17th district ==
Incumbent 17th district commissioner Sean Morrison, a Republican, is retiring.

=== Republican primary ===
==== Candidates ====
- Liz Gorman, former commissioner (2002–2015) and candidate for this district in 2022

===== Declined =====
- Sean Morrison, incumbent commissioner

==== Results ====
2026 Cook County Board of Commissioners 17th district Republican primary
Party	Candidate	Votes	%
Republican	Elizabeth "Liz" Doody Gorman		
Total votes			100.0

=== Democratic primary ===
==== Candidates ====
- Elyse Hoffenberg, Lyons Township clerk

==== Endorsements ====
Elyse Hoffenberg

Labor unions

- Chicago Federation of Labor
- International Brotherhood of Electrical Workers Local 134
- International Union of Operating Engineers Locals 150 and 399
- Plumbers Local 130

Organizations

- Sierra Club Illinois

==== Results ====
2026 Cook County Board of Commissioners 17th district Democratic primary
Party	Candidate	Votes	%
Democratic	Elyse Hoffenberg		
Total votes			100

=== General election ===
2026 Cook County Board of Commissioners 17th district election
Party	Candidate	Votes	%
Democratic	Elyse Hoffenberg	58,772	57.71
Republican	Elizabeth "Liz" Doody Gorman	43,073	42.29
Total votes		101,845	100

== Summarizing statistics ==
Contest summary
Party	Seats held before	Seats contested	Seats won
Democratic	16	17	17
Republican	1	8	0
Total	17	25	17

Contests by parties contesting
Parties contesting	Total	Democratic wins	Republicans wins
Seats contested by Democratic and Republican nominees	8	8	0
Seats contested only by Democratic nominees	9	9	—N/a
Total	17	17	0

Vote summary
Party	Popular vote	Seats won
Democratic	1,151,134 (87.25%)	17
Republican	168,100 (12.74%)	0
Total	1,319,234	—N/a

Fate of incumbents
Party	Total incumbents	Incumbents that sought reelection/retired	Incumbents that won/lost re-nomination in primaries	Incumbents that were renominated
Democratic	16	14 sought reelection 2 retired	12 won re-nomination 2 lost re-nomination	12 won reelection 0 lost
Republican	1	0 sought reelection 1 retired	—N/a	—N/a
Total	17	14 sought reelection 3 retired	12 won re-nomination 2 lost re-nomination	12 won reelection 0 lost

Composition of elected board (returning/newly elected members)
Party	Returning members	Newly elected members	Total members
Democratic	12	5	17
Republican	0	0	0
Total	12	5	17
