= 2018 Cook County Board of Commissioners election =

- November 6, 2018

All 17 seats on the Cook County Board of Commissioners 9 seats needed for a majority
	First party	Second party
Party	Democratic	Republican
Seats before	13	4
Seats won	15	2
Seat change	▲2	▼2
Popular vote	1,292,420	287,854
Percentage	81.79%	18.22%
Swing	▲4.67%	▼4.62%
- Results: Democratic gain Democratic hold Republican hold Vote Share: 50–60% 70–80% 80–90% >90% 50–60%

The 2018 Cook County Board of Commissioners election was held on November 6, 2018, and was preceded by primary elections held on March 20, 2018. It saw all seventeen seats of the Cook County Board of Commissioners up for election to four-year terms and coincided with other 2018 Cook County, Illinois, elections (including the election for president of the Cook County Board of Commissioners).

Anticipating a probable wave election year for Democrats, President of the Cook County Board of Commissioners and Cook County Democratic Party Chairwoman Toni Preckwinkle made a focused effort to increase the Democrats' majority on the Cook County Board of Commissioners, focusing these efforts on three of the Board's four Republican-held seats. Preckwinkle-backed Democratic nominees ultimately succeeded in ousting Republican incumbents in the 14th and 15th districts, but fell roughly a mere 2,000 votes shy of unseating the 17th district's Republican incumbent. Preckwinkle did not target the Republican-held 9th district seat, as the incumbent Republican, Peter N. Silvestri, was both popular and a political centrist and had a reputation for being a peacemaker on the Board at times when conflict arose between its members.Democrats ran candidates for all seventeen seats, compared to the fifteen seats that the party had contested in the preceding 2014 election. Meanwhile, Republicans ran candidates for eight seats, and increase from the five seats they had contested in the 2014 election.

Seven new members were elected, and ten incumbents were reelected. Three incumbents did not seek reelection. Four incumbents lost reelection, with two being defeated in primaries and the other two losing their general elections.

Two races saw seats change party, in both instances seeing an incumbent Republican losing to a Democratic challenger, creating a net gain of two seats for Democrats and a net loss of two seats for Republicans. Nine races saw a Democrat unchallenged in the general election.

== Campaign ==
Anticipating a potential wave election year for Democrats, President of the Cook County Board of Commissioners and Cook County Democratic Party Chairwoman Toni Preckwinkle made a focused effort to increase the Democrats' majority on the Cook County Board of Commissioners, focusing these efforts on three of the Board's four Republican-held seats. Preckwinkle-backed Democratic nominees ultimately succeeded in ousting Republican incumbents in the 14th and 15th districts, but fell roughly a mere 2,000 votes shy of unseating the 17th district's Republican incumbent. Preckwinkle did not target the Republican-held 9th district seat, as the incumbent Republican, Peter N. Silvestri, was both popular and a political centrist and had a reputation for being a peacemaker on the Board at times when conflict arose between its members.

Preckwinkle personally backed Brandon Johnson in his successful primary challenge against Democratic incumbent Richard Boykin. Boykin had been a critic of Preckwinkle, particularly over the a controversial soda tax measure, and had considered challenging her in her primary for board president.

== 1st district ==
Incumbent first-term Commissioner Richard Boykin, a Democrat, lost reelection, being unseated in the Democratic primary by Brandon Johnson by a margin of 0.88%. Johnson went on to win the general election unopposed.

=== Primaries ===
==== Democratic ====
Cook County Board of Commissioners 1st district Democratic primary
Party	Candidate	Votes	%
Democratic	Brandon Johnson	24,863	50.44
Democratic	Richard Boykin (incumbent)	24,426	49.56
Total votes		49,289	100

==== Republican ====
Only write-in candidates ran in the Republican primary. No certified write-in received enough votes to win the nomination.

Cook County Board of Commissioners 1st district Republican primary
Party	Candidate	Votes	%
Write-in	Others	74	100
Total votes		74	100

=== General election ===
Cook County Board of Commissioners 1st district election
Party	Candidate	Votes	%
Democratic	Brandon Johnson	88,590	100
Total votes		88,590	100

== 2nd district ==
Incumbent Commissioner Dennis Deer, who was appointed in 2017 to fill the vacancy left by the death in office of Robert Steele, won election to his first full term.

=== Primaries ===
==== Democratic ====
Cook County Board of Commissioners 2nd district Democratic primary
Party	Candidate	Votes	%
Democratic	Dennis Deer (incumbent)	11,522	32.59
Democratic	Eddie Johnson III	7,482	21.16
Democratic	Darryl D. Smith	6,824	19.30
Democratic	Lupe Aguirre	5,353	15.14
Democratic	Paul J. Montes II	3,976	11.25
Write-in	Others	196	0.55
Total votes		35,353	100

==== Republican ====
No candidates, ballot-certified or formal write-in, ran in the Republican primary.

=== General election ===
Cook County Board of Commissioners 2nd district election
Party	Candidate	Votes	%
Democratic	Dennis Deer (incumbent)	78,380	100
Total votes		78,380	100

== 3rd district ==
Incumbent Commissioner Jerry Butler, a Democrat who first assumed the office in 1985, did not seek reelection. Democrat Bill Lowry was elected to succeed him.

=== Primaries ===
==== Democratic ====
Cook County Board of Commissioners 3rd district Democratic primary
Party	Candidate	Votes	%
Democratic	Bill Lowry	17,814	33.29
Democratic	Patricia Horton	11,518	21.52
Democratic	Charise A. Williams	9,373	17.51
Democratic	Joshua Gray	5,145	9.61
Democratic	Horace "Washington" Howard	4,774	8.92
Democratic	Steven R. Wolfe	4,124	7.71
Democratic	Erick M. Nickerson	769	1.44
Total votes		53,517	100

==== Republican ====
No candidates, ballot-certified or formal write-in, ran in the Republican primary. Republicans ultimately nominated George Blakemore.

=== General election ===
Cook County Board of Commissioners 3rd district election
Party	Candidate	Votes	%
Democratic	Bill Lowry	101,576	89.57
Republican	George Blakemore	11,834	10.43
Total votes		113,410	100

== 4th district ==
Incumbent Commissioner Stanley Moore, a Democrat who was appointed to the office in 2013 and was elected outright to a full term in 2014, won reelection to a second full term.

=== Primaries ===
==== Democratic ====
Cook County Board of Commissioners 4th district Democratic primary
Party	Candidate	Votes	%
Democratic	Stanley S. Moore (incumbent)	24,117	48.11
Democratic	Maria M. Barlow	17,951	35.81
Democratic	Marcel Bright	4,730	9.44
Democratic	Gaylon Alcaraz	3,326	6.64
Total votes		50,124	100

==== Republican ====
No candidates, ballot-certified or formal write-in, ran in the Republican primary.

=== General election ===
Cook County Board of Commissioners 4th district election
Party	Candidate	Votes	%
Democratic	Stanley S. Moore (incumbent)	88,736	100
Total votes		88,736	100

== 5th district ==
Incumbent sixth-term Commissioner Deborah Sims, a Democrat, was reelected.

=== Primaries ===
==== Democratic ====
Cook County Board of Commissioners 5th district Democratic primary
Party	Candidate	Votes	%
Democratic	Deborah Sims (incumbent)	33,790	76.69
Democratic	Timothy "Tim" Parker	6,732	15.28
Democratic	Audrey Lynn Tanksley	3,427	7.78
Write-in	Others	113	0.26
Total votes		44,062	100

==== Republican ====
No candidates, ballot-certified or formal write-in, ran in the Republican primary.

=== General election ===
Cook County Board of Commissioners 5th district election
Party	Candidate	Votes	%
Democratic	Deborah Sims (incumbent)	81,711	100
Total votes		81,711	100

== 6th district ==
Incumbent Commissioner Edward Moody, a Democrat who was appointed to the seat in 2016 following the death in office of Joan Patricia Murphy, did not seek reelection. Democrat Donna Miller was elected to succeed him.

=== Primaries ===
==== Democratic ====
Donna Miller defeated Patricia Joan Murphy, the daughter of deceased former 6th district commissioner Joan Patricia Murphy and Crestwood mayor Louis Presta.

Cook County Board of Commissioners 6th district Democratic primary
Party	Candidate	Votes	%
Democratic	Donna Miller	17,907	43.38
Democratic	Patricia Joan Murphy	16,762	40.61
Democratic	Louis Presta	6,611	16.02
Total votes		41,280	100

==== Republican ====
No candidates, ballot-certified or formal write-in, ran in the Republican primary.

=== General election ===
Cook County Board of Commissioners 6th district election
Party	Candidate	Votes	%
Democratic	Donna Miller	82,556	100
Total votes		82,556	100

== 7th district ==
Incumbent second-term Commissioner Jesús "Chuy" García, a Democrat, did not seek reelection, instead opting to run for election to Illinois's 4th congressional district. Democrat Alma Anaya was elected to succeed him.

=== Primaries ===
==== Democratic ====
Cook County Board of Commissioners 7th district Democratic primary
Party	Candidate	Votes	%
Democratic	Alma E. Anaya	14,159	56.85
Democratic	Angeles Sandoval	10,664	42.81
Write-in	Others	85	0.34
Total votes		24,908	100

==== Republican ====
No candidates, ballot-certified or formal write-in, ran in the Republican primary.

=== General election ===
Cook County Board of Commissioners 7th district election
Party	Candidate	Votes	%
Democratic	Alma E. Anaya	41,759	100
Total votes		41,759	100

== 8th district ==
Incumbent first-term Commissioner Luis Arroyo Jr., a Democrat, was reelected.

=== Primaries ===
==== Democratic ====
Cook County Board of Commissioners 8th district Democratic primary
Party	Candidate	Votes	%
Democratic	Luis Arroyo Jr. (incumbent)	30,512	99.11
Write-in	Others	273	0.89
Total votes		30,785	100

==== Republican ====
Cook County Board of Commissioners 8th district Republican primary
Party	Candidate	Votes	%
Republican	Walter Zarnecki	1,253	67.80
Republican	Renne "Tex" Chavez	595	32.20
Total votes		1,848	100

=== General election ===
Cook County Board of Commissioners 8th district election
Party	Candidate	Votes	%
Democratic	Luis Arroyo Jr. (incumbent)	73,296	89.29
Republican	Walter Zarnecki	8,792	10.71
Total votes		82,088	100

== 9th district ==
Incumbent sixth-term Commissioner Peter N. Silvestri, a Republican, was reelected.

=== Primaries ===
==== Democratic ====
Cook County Board of Commissioners 9th district Democratic primary
Party	Candidate	Votes	%
Democratic	Frank L. McPartlin	28,673	100
Total votes		28,673	100

==== Republican ====
Cook County Board of Commissioners 9th district Republican primary
Party	Candidate	Votes	%
Republican	Peter N. Silvestri (incumbent)	13,988	100
Total votes		13,988	100

=== General election ===
Cook County Board of Commissioners 9th district election
Party	Candidate	Votes	%
Republican	Peter N. Silvestri (incumbent)	55,612	52.24
Democratic	Frank L. McPartlin	50,839	47.76
Total votes		106,451	100

== 10th district ==
Incumbent Commissioner Bridget Gainer, a Democrat first appointed in 2009 and elected outright to two full-terms, was reelected.

=== Primaries ===
==== Democratic ====
Cook County Board of Commissioners 10th district Democratic primary
Party	Candidate	Votes	%
Democratic	Bridget Gainer (incumbent)	37,529	74.22
Democratic	Mary Ann Kosiak	13,034	25.78
Total votes		50,563	100

==== Republican ====
No candidates, ballot-certified or formal write-in, ran in the Republican primary.

=== General election ===
Cook County Board of Commissioners 10th district election
Party	Candidate	Votes	%
Democratic	Bridget Gainer (incumbent)	113,803	100
Total votes		113,803	100

== 11th district ==
Incumbent Commissioner John P. Daley, a Democrat in office since 1992, was reelected.

=== Primaries ===
==== Democratic ====
Cook County Board of Commissioners 11th district Democratic primary
Party	Candidate	Votes	%
Democratic	John P. Daley (incumbent)	44,236	100
Total votes		44,236	100

==== Republican ====
Cook County Board of Commissioners 11th district Republican primary
Party	Candidate	Votes	%
Republican	Steven S. Graves	3,381	51.70
Republican	Carl Segvich	3,159	48.30
Total votes		6,540	100

=== General election ===
Cook County Board of Commissioners 11th district election
Party	Candidate	Votes	%
Democratic	John P. Daley (incumbent)	71,997	73.56
Republican	Steven S. Graves	25,872	26.44
Total votes		97,869	100

== 12th district ==
Incumbent second-term Commissioner John Fritchey, a Democrat, lost reelection, being unseated in the Democratic primary by Bridget Degnen, who went on to win the general election unopposed.

=== Primaries ===
==== Democratic ====
Cook County Board of Commissioners 12th district Democratic primary
Party	Candidate	Votes	%
Democratic	Bridget Degnen	23,703	55.36
Democratic	John Fritchey (incumbent)	19,113	44.64
Total votes		42,816	100

==== Republican ====
No candidates, ballot-certified or formal write-in, ran in the Republican primary.

=== General election ===
Cook County Board of Commissioners 12th district election
Party	Candidate	Votes	%
Democratic	Bridget Degnen	93,561	100
Total votes		93,561	100

== 13th district ==
Incumbent fourth-term Commissioner Larry Suffredin, a Democrat, was reelected.

=== Primaries ===
==== Democratic ====
Cook County Board of Commissioners 13th district Democratic primary
Party	Candidate	Votes	%
Democratic	Larry Suffredin (incumbent)	30,009	57.00
Democratic	Bushra Amiwala	13,988	26.57
Democratic	Daniel Foster	8,653	16.43
Total votes		52,650	100

==== Republican ====
Cook County Board of Commissioners 13th district Republican primary
Party	Candidate	Votes	%
Republican	Chris J. Hanusiak	6,708	100
Total votes		6,708	100

=== General election ===
Cook County Board of Commissioners 13th district election
Party	Candidate	Votes	%
Democratic	Larry Suffredin (incumbent)	95,500	77.54
Republican	Chris J. Hanusiak	27,662	22.46
Total votes		123,162	100

== 14th district ==
Incumbent fifth-term Commissioner Gregg Goslin, a Republican, lost reelection to Democrat Scott R. Britton.

=== Primaries ===
==== Democratic ====
Cook County Board of Commissioners 14th district Democratic primary
Party	Candidate	Votes	%
Democratic	Scott R. Britton	26,728	100
Total votes		26,728	100

==== Republican ====
Cook County Board of Commissioners 14th district Republican primary
Party	Candidate	Votes	%
Republican	Gregg Goslin (incumbent)	15,330	100
Total votes		15,330	100

=== General election ===
Cook County Board of Commissioners 14th district election
Party	Candidate	Votes	%
Democratic	Scott R. Britton	62,792	54.19
Republican	Gregg Goslin (incumbent)	53,079	45.81
Total votes		115,871	100

== 15th district ==
Incumbent third-term Commissioner Tim Schneider, a Republican, lost reelection to Democrat Kevin B. Morrison.

=== Primaries ===
==== Democratic ====
Cook County Board of Commissioners 15th district Democratic primary
Party	Candidate	Votes	%
Democratic	Kevin B. Morrison	11,756	50.02
Democratic	Ravi Raju	11,746	49.98
Total votes		23,502	100

==== Republican ====
Cook County Board of Commissioners 15th district Republican primary
Party	Candidate	Votes	%
Republican	Timothy Owen Schneider (incumbent)	13,157	100
Total votes		13,157	100

=== General election ===
Cook County Board of Commissioners 15th district election
Party	Candidate	Votes	%
Democratic	Kevin B. Morrison	52,807	54.93
Republican	Timothy Owen Schneider (incumbent)	43,331	45.07
Total votes		96,138	100

== 16th district ==
Incumbent second-term Commissioner Jeff Tobolski, a Democrat, was reelected, running unopposed in both the Democratic primary and general election.

=== Primaries ===
==== Democratic ====
Cook County Board of Commissioners 16th district Democratic primary
Party	Candidate	Votes	%
Democratic	Jeff Tobolski (incumbent)	22,117	100
Total votes		22,117	100

==== Republican ====
No candidates, ballot-certified or formal write-in, ran in the Republican primary.

=== General election ===
Cook County Board of Commissioners 16th district election
Party	Candidate	Votes	%
Democratic	Jeff Tobolski (incumbent)	54,322	100
Total votes		54,322	100

== 17th district ==
Incumbent Commissioner Sean M. Morrison, a Republican appointed in 2015 following the resignation of Elizabeth Ann Doody Gorman, was reelected, defeating his Democratic opponent, Abdelnasser Rashid, by a narrow 1.14% margin in the general election.

=== Primaries ===
==== Democratic ====
Cook County Board of Commissioners 17th district Democratic primary
Party	Candidate	Votes	%
Democratic	Abdelnasser Rashid	29,154	100
Total votes		29,154	100

==== Republican ====
Cook County Board of Commissioners 17th district Republican primary
Party	Candidate	Votes	%
Republican	Sean M. Morrison (incumbent)	16,189	100
Total votes		16,189	100

=== General election ===
Cook County Board of Commissioners 17th district election
Party	Candidate	Votes	%
Republican	Sean M. Morrison (incumbent)	61,572	50.57
Democratic	Abdelnasser Rashid	60,195	49.43
Total votes		121,767	100

== Summarizing statistics ==
Contest summary
Party	Seats held before	Seats contested	Seats won
Democratic	13	17	15
Republican	4	8	2

Contests by parties contesting
Parties contesting	Total	Democratic wins	Republicans wins
Seats contested by Democratic and Republican nominees	8	6	2
Seats contested only by Democratic nominees	9	9	—N/a

Vote summary
Party	Popular vote	Seats won
Democratic	1,292,420 (81.79%)	15
Republican	287,854 (18.22%)	2
Total	1,580,274	—N/a

Fate of incumbents
Party	Total incumbents	Incumbents that sought reelection/retired	Incumbents that won/lost re-nomination in primaries	Incumbents that won/lost general election
Democratic	13	10 sought reelection 3 retired	8 won re-nomination 2 lost renomination	8 won 0 lost
Republican	4	4 sought reelection 0 retired	4 won re-nomination 0 lost renomination	2 won 2 lost

Composition of elected board (returning/newly elected members)
Party	Returning members	Newly elected members
Democratic	8	7
Republican	2	0
