= John P. Daley =

American politician (born 1946)

John Daley
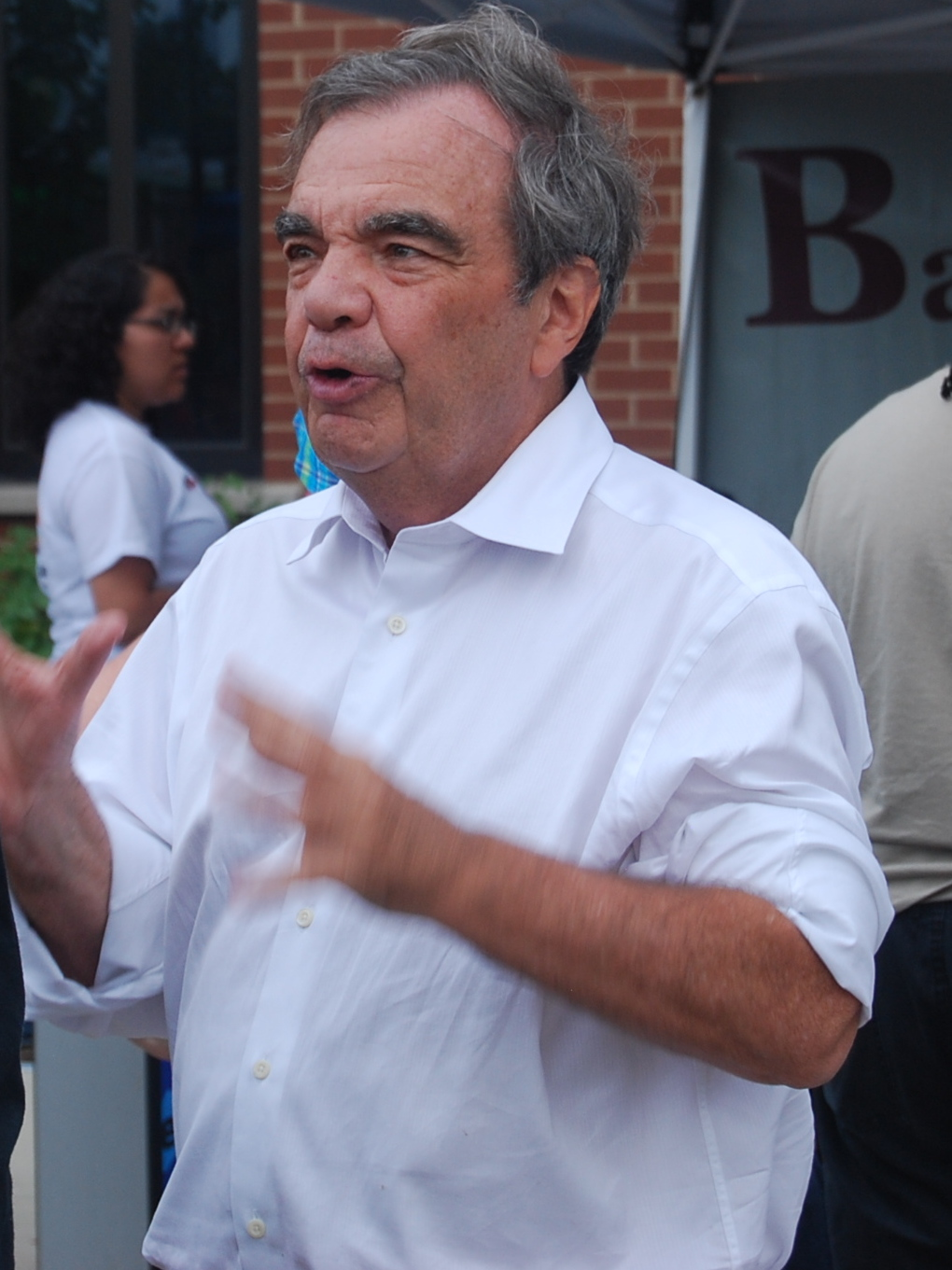
- Daley in 2013

Member of the Cook County Board of Commissioners
- Incumbent
- Assumed office February 3, 1992
- Preceded by: Charles Bernardini
- Constituency: 11th (1994–present); Chicago at-large (1992–94)

Member of the Illinois Senate from the 11th district
- In office January 11, 1989 – February 3, 1992
- Preceded by: Timothy F. Degnan
- Succeeded by: Pamela Munizzi

Member of the Illinois House of Representatives from the 21st district
- In office January 9, 1985 – January 11, 1989
- Preceded by: John Vitek
- Succeeded by: Pamela Munizzi

Personal details
- Born: December 5, 1946 (age 79) Chicago, Illinois, U.S.
- Party: Democratic
- Spouse: Mary Lou Briatta (m. 1975)
- Children: 3
- Parent(s): Richard J. Daley; Sis Daley
- Relatives: Richard M. Daley (brother); William M. Daley (brother)
- Education: Loyola University Chicago (BA)

John P. Daley (born December 5, 1946) is an American politician and insurance broker. He is the 11th Ward Democratic Committeeman in Chicago, Illinois, a member of the Cook County Board of Commissioners (11th district), and the Chair of the Cook County Board Finance Committee. He has previously served in both the Illinois State Senate and the Illinois House of Representatives, as well as being employed as a school teacher. He is the son of former Chicago Mayor Richard J. Daley and brother of former Mayor Richard M. Daley, as well as William M. Daley, former White House Chief of Staff under President Obama and United States Secretary of Commerce under President Bill Clinton. Unlike his brothers, he continues to live in the neighborhood the family was raised in.

== Early life and education ==
Daley was born in Mercy Hospital and raised in the Bridgeport neighborhood on Chicago's South Side. He is the second youngest child of former six-term Chicago Mayor Richard J. Daley and Eleanor "Sis" Daley. Daley is an alumnus of St. Ignatius College Preparatory School and Loyola University. He was about eight years old when his father was first elected mayor and grew up at 3536 South Lowe with Chicago Police Department patrol cars famously stationed out front at all times, however the Daley children walked to school unescorted.

== Personal life ==
When John's wedding to Mary Lou Briatta was announced in the April 24, 1975, edition of the Chicago Tribune, the headline read: "Daley's son to wed hood's daughter" due to his fiancees' father, Louis Briatta, linked to connections with organized crime. The two have three children: John R., Mikey, and Christine.

Daley is currently the only son of the former mayor who still lives in Bridgeport.

== Political career ==
Daley serves as the Ward Democratic Committeeman for the same 11th Ward that his father and brother served before him in the same capacity. He assumed the position in 1980 from his brother who left the post to become Cook County's State's Attorney. Daley oversees the ward's 50 precincts and their captains as well as assistants year round. Among the duties of the ward committeemen are to determine Democratic endorsed nominees for office in their region. For example, when a United States Congressman such as Bill Lipinski leaves an unexpired term of office, Daley and other Ward Committeemen from affected districts such as Edward M. Burke and Michael Madigan meet to endorse a new candidate such as Dan Lipinski.

John Vitek resigned from the Illinois House of Representatives on September 19, 1985 for health reasons, which made way for Daley's appointment. In the Illinois House of Representatives, Daley served the 21st District.

In 1989, when his brother Mayor-elect Richard Daley named Timothy F. Degnan to his cabinet, John was able to move from the Illinois House of Representatives into Degnan's seat in the Illinois Senate that Degnan had assumed when Richard Daley went on to become Cook County states attorney nine years earlier. In 1991, the Republican Party controlled the decennial redistricting and the Illinois State Senate districts were drawn to place John Daley into an unfavorable majority Black district. In 1991, Charles Bernardini vacated a seat on the Cook County Board. On February 3, 1992, after a few months of political dealings, Daley was voted in as the new 10th Chicago member of the Board by the other nine. Pamela Munizzi was Daley's successors in both moves from Illinois General Assembly posts.

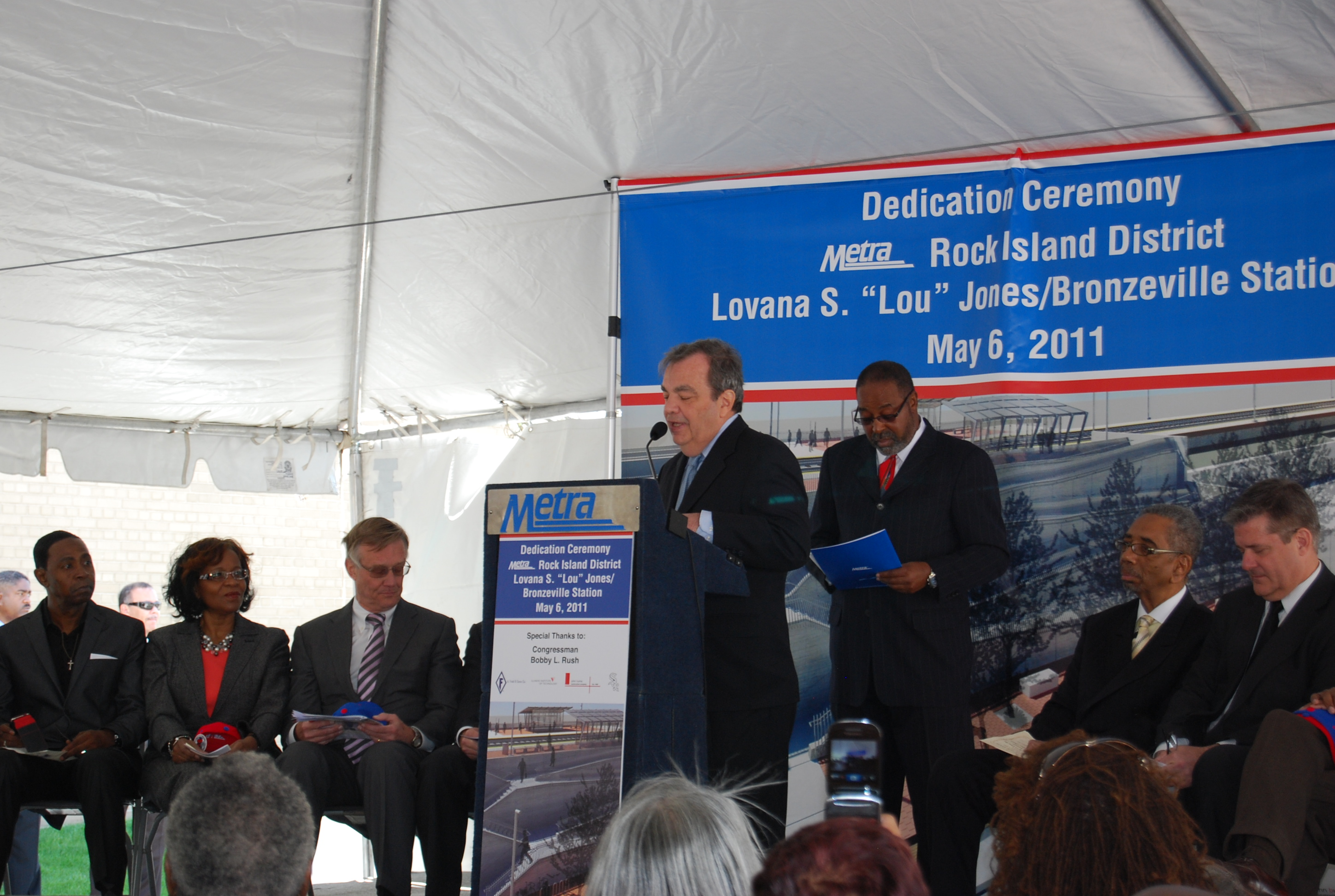
Daley speaking at the dedication ceremony of the 35th Street station in 2011

When John Stroger, who was first elected to the Cook County Board of Commissioners in 1970 and who served three terms as President beginning in 1994, suffered a stroke on March 14, 2006, Daley was mentioned as a likely fill-in who could be trusted until Stroger's son, Todd Stroger, could run to replace his father as President and William Beavers could run for his seat in the November 2006 elections. Time described Daley as the second most powerful person on the board at the time. In 2001, U.S. News & World Report felt Daley might rise to the presidency of the board himself on more than an interim basis.

On the Cook County Board, he serves as chairman of the Audit and Finance committees. He is a member of the Health & Hospital, Information Technology & Automation, and Rules & Administration committees.

== Insurance career ==
In 1973 when he was 26, Daley first met with controversy involving his insurance career. At that time, the press made an issue of his father's decision to shift some of the city's insurance business to the Evanston, Illinois, insurance firm with which John had business ties.

In 2003, Daley confirmed that he earned US$400,000 annually from insurance commissions. In 2005, a hired truck scandal involved a client of Daley who plead guilty in the bribes-for-work scandal. Several of Daley's 11th Ward organization political operatives were charged or accused of being involved in the situation. Daley, however, escaped direct involvement in the ordeal, which was investigated by United States Attorney Patrick Fitzgerald in a federal investigation.

Daley's business causes him many conflicts of interests in the course of business as a Commissioner on the Cook County Board. He frequently recuses himself or abstains from voting on various matters of business because of his extensive insurance network. Several of his clients do millions of dollars of business with the city and some are active in the city's hired truck program. In addition to his own clients, he is an officer in another insurance company that has no city government business.
