= Munizzi =

Munizzi (pronounced [muˈnittsi]) is an Italian surname. Notable people with the name include:

- Martha Munizzi (born 1968), American singer, songwriter, author and Christian pastor
- Pamela Munizzi (born 1954), American politician
