= Forrest Claypool =

American politician (born 1958)

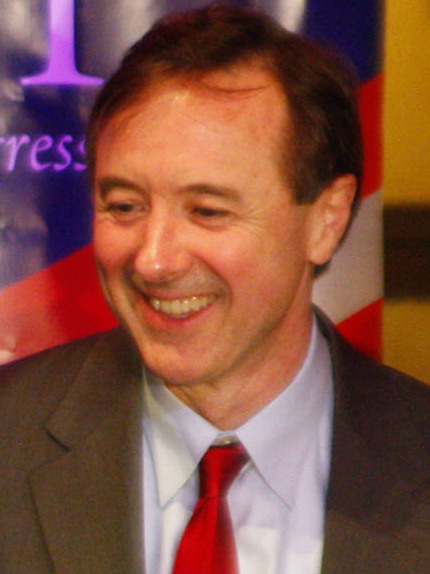
- Claypool in 2009

6th CEO of Chicago Public Schools
- In office July 27, 2015 – December 8, 2017
- Appointed by: Rahm Emanuel
- Preceded by: Barbara Byrd-Bennett; Jesse Ruiz (interim)
- Succeeded by: Janice K. Jackson

President of the Chicago Transit Authority
- In office 2011–2015
- Preceded by: Richard L. Rodriguez
- Succeeded by: Dorval Carter

Member of the Cook County Board of Commissioners from the 12th district
- In office December 2002 – December 2010
- Preceded by: Ted Lechowicz
- Succeeded by: John Fritchey

Personal details
- Born: Forrest Edward Claypool; 1958 (age 67–68) Vandalia, Illinois, U.S.
- Party: Democratic
- Spouse: Has a wife
- Children: Three
- Education: Southern Illinois University (B.A.); University of Illinois (J.D.)
- Profession: Attorney
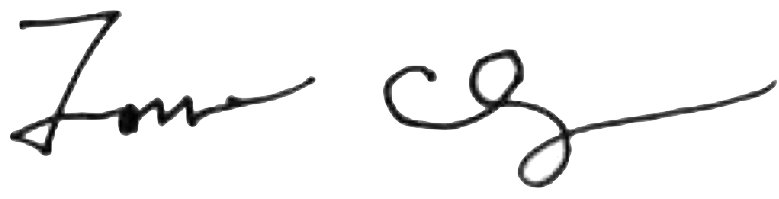
- Signature

Forrest Edward Claypool is an American politician who has held several positions in the governments of Chicago, Cook County, and the State of Illinois. He was the Chief Executive Officer of Chicago Public Schools from July 27, 2015, until December 8, 2017. Previous offices held by Claypool include Superintendent of the Chicago Park District from 1993 to 1998, Chief of Staff to Chicago Mayor Rahm Emanuel, and President of the Chicago Transit Authority. In 2007–2008, Claypool served as a key member of Barack Obama campaign's media team, in his capacity as a longtime partner of David Axelrod.

An attorney, he lives in the Lakeview neighborhood of Chicago. Claypool is twice married and has three children.

== Education and early career ==
Born in Vandalia, Illinois in 1958, Claypool grew up in downstate in the nearby town of St. Elmo, Illinois. Claypool received his bachelor's degree from Southern Illinois University in Carbondale, and in 1981, graduated with a J.D. degree from the University of Illinois College of Law, where he was editor of the school's law review. After school, Claypool worked as an attorney and served in several non-elected positions in state and county government, including deputy commissioner of the Cook County Board of Appeals and as Deputy State Treasurer.

In 1984, he helped his friend David Axelrod, a Democratic political consultant, found the firm Axelrod and Associates (now AKPD Message & Media). Claypool served as the firm's managing partner until 1989 when he left to serve in the administration of Mayor Richard M. Daley.

== Chicago Park District ==
In 1989, Claypool began working for Mayor Daley, serving for two years as his first Chief of Staff. In 1993, Daley asked Claypool to take on the task of overhauling the Chicago Park District after allegations of the hired truck scandal that made public while he was the mayor's chief of staff.

When Claypool became the CEO and Superintendent of the CPD, the District had a budget of $300 million as well as a payroll of 4,100 full-time employees and roughly an equal number of seasonal employees. Despite this extraordinarily large payroll, many basic services were not being performed. Under Claypool's tenure and Daley's command, many of the politically appointed positions were eliminated and many employees were forced to reapply for their jobs. By 1996, the payroll had fallen to 3,000 full-time employees while services improved according to many groups that studied the parks.

When Claypool took over the District in 1993 it was also in financial disorder. For example, the District had outlays of $65 million for capital improvements but it had only $15 million in cash; it had also reached the maximum on its debt ceiling. Using the money saved from staff attrition and layoff, as well as from canceling projects he felt were wasteful, Claypool began to downsize and privatize some of the park district's services instead of performing them in-house.

"In 1993, Kemper Golf Management, Chicago, took over the operation of the district's six golf courses and two driving ranges. The contract guarantees the park district about $250,000 a year up front for capital improvements, and the remaining revenues are divided equally. In 1992, the district suffered a $530,000 operating deficit; in 1994, that was turned into a $550,000 profit." (Kelly 1995, American City and County) The CPD also began experimenting with the partial privatization of Soldier Field and its parking lots. In 1994, Soldier Field turned a profit for the first time in its history. Due to the success of the partial privatization, the Soldier Field Joint Venture started managing the stadium in late 1994.

Claypool left the CPD in 1996 to serve a second term as Chief of Staff to Daley. In 1998, he managed the mayor's successful reelection campaign, one in which he received over 75% of the vote and won majorities of the white, black, Hispanic, and Asian votes.

== Cook County Board ==
Casting himself as a "reformer", Claypool made a run for the Cook County Board in 2002. Waging a fierce campaign in which he attacked what he saw as patronage and a bloated bureaucracy in the county government, Claypool went on to upset incumbent Commissioner Ted Lechowicz 51–49% in the March 19 Democratic primary. (Lechowicz was a strong supporter of Cook County Board President John Stroger Jr.) Because Claypool's district (the 12th district) is overwhelmingly Democratic, he faced only nominal opposition in the general election.

Claypool quickly allied himself with fellow freshmen Commissioners Larry Suffredin (D) and Tony Peraica (R). The three were joined by sophomore Commissioner Mike Quigley (D). When, in December 2003, the four reformers garnered enough swing votes to defeat Stroger's FY 2004 budget (the first time such a thing had happened to a Cook County Board President in three decades), Stroger gave Claypool a backhanded compliment, saying, "The media has prevailed, along with Mr. Claypool." This quote ran under the banner headline, "Hell Freezes Over: Cook County Board rejects Stroger's budget" in the Chicago Sun-Times. The following year (FY 2005), the County Board rejected Stroger's tax increases again.

== County Board president election ==
Claypool declared in December that he would run for the Democratic nomination for County Board President in 2006. John Stroger, who was a Democrat, announced earlier that he would seek a fourth term, setting up a race among Claypool, Stroger, and Quigley for the Democratic nomination. Quigley dropped out in mid-December, saying "I am throwing my full effort and support to help elect Forrest Claypool as the next County Board President."

Claypool raised more campaign funds than every other candidate in 2005, ending the first half of the year with over $900,000. Most pundits agreed that the Democratic primary was the real election, as Cook County is one of the most Democratic counties in the entire nation. Claypool won the support of many newspapers, including the Chicago Tribune, the Chicago Sun-Times, Crain's Chicago Business, the Daily Herald, the Daily Southtown, and others. In addition, he was endorsed by Rep. Rahm Emanuel and Lt. Gov. Pat Quinn.

Despite the endorsements, and the fact that Stroger suffered a stroke a week before, Claypool still lost to Stroger in the primary. The Cook County Democratic Party appointed Stroger's son Todd Stroger as the nominee to run against Tony Peraica in the general election. Todd Stroger won the election. Claypool refused to endorse Stroger and was chastised heavily by Democratic politicians and stalwarts including Mayor Daley.

== County Assessor election ==
On Tuesday, April 6, 2010, Claypool announced he would enter the Cook County Assessor election as an independent candidate. He officially qualified to be entered onto the general election ballot on June 28, after collecting more than three times the number of voter signatures required for independent candidates seeking office in Illinois. Claypool ran against Democrat Joseph Berrios, Green Robert Grota and Republican Sharon Strobeck-Eckersall. He was the first independent candidate to run in the history of the Cook County Assessor's office. Berrios won the race with 47.9 percent of the vote, against 31.8 percent for Claypool, 17.7 percent for Strobeck-Eckersall, and 2.6 percent for Grota.

== Post-electoral government career ==
On Tuesday, April 19, 2011, Chicago Mayor Rahm Emanuel—a longtime political ally of Claypool—appointed him president of the Chicago Transit Authority Claypool was named Chief of Staff to mayor Rahm Emanuel in April 2015.

=== CEO of Chicago Public Schools ===
Mayor Rahm Emanuel announced on July 16, 2015, that Claypool would assume the role of chief executive officer of Chicago Public Schools on July 27, 2015. His appointment, affective July 27, was formally approved by the Chicago Board of Education on July 22. Claypool resigned as CEO on December 8, 2017, after the school district's inspector general accused him of engineering a "full-blown cover-up" during an ethics investigation concerning the school system's chief attorney.
