= Fred J. Smith =

American politician (1899–1988)

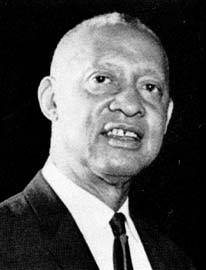
- Smith, circa 1971

Member of the Illinois Senate
- In office 1956–1979
- Constituency: 3rd district (1955–1963); 11th district (1963–1971); 22nd district (1971–1979)

Member of the Illinois House of Representatives from the 3rd district
- In office 1943–1955

Personal details
- Born: Chattanooga, Tennessee or Kosse, Texas
- Died: October 19, 1988 Chicago, Illinois
- Party: Democratic
- Spouse: Margaret
- Education: Roger Williams University; Fisk University

Fred J. Smith (July 4, 1899 – October 19, 1988) was an American state legislator in Illinois. He served numerous terms in the Illinois House and them the Illinois Senate.

== Early life ==
His date and place of birth are contended. According to his obituary Smith was born Chattanooga, Tennessee and born circa 1898 or 1899 being aged 89 at his death in 1988. Another source claims that he was born April 14, 1892 on a farm near Kosse, Texas and both of his parents were enslaved. The Journal of the Senate in 1989 says he was born in Chattanooga but on July 4, 1893. The 1971 Illinois Blue Book listed his birth as being on July 4, 1899 in Chattanooga.

Smith was educated in public schools in Chattanooga. He was further educated at the Christian Institute at Roger Williams University and at Fisk University.

In 1930, he became a deputy clerk of the Municipal Court of Chicago, a job that he would hold through the 1970s.

== Political career ==
A Democrat, Smith was first elected to the Illinois House of Representatives in 1942 to serve the 3rd district and served from 1943 to 1955.

He was elected to the Illinois Senate in 1954 serving from 1955 to 1979 representing the 3rd, then 11th and finally the 22nd districts.

== Personal life and death ==
Fisk was a catholic. He was married to Margaret Smith who was also a member of the Illinois Senate.

Smith died at his home in Illinois, on October 19, 1988, at the age of 89.
