= Margaret Smith (Illinois politician) =

American politician (died 2005)

official portrait, circa 1987

Margaret Smith (died May 16, 2005) was an American politician who served as a Democratic Party member of the Illinois House of Representatives and the Illinois Senate.

== Early life ==
A native of Chicago, Smith attended Tennessee State University. She was heavily involved with the Baptist Church serving President of the Women's Department of the Progressive National Baptist Convention, the Baptist State Convention of Illinois, as Midwest field representative for the Baptist Foreign Mission Bureau, and as a member of the board of trustees of the Chicago Baptist Institute. Her husband, Fred J. Smith was a long-serving member of the Illinois Senate and died in October 22, 1988.

== Illinois General Assembly ==
In the 1980 general election, Smith was elected to the Illinois House of Representatives. After the 1991 Republican-controlled decennial reapportionment, Smith and Pamela Munizzi were drawn into the same district. In the 1992 Democratic primary, Smith defeated Pamela Munizzi for the Democratic nomination to the Illinois Senate from the 3rd district. In 1999, she became the Chair of the Senate Democratic Caucus. After winning re-election in 2002, Smith resigned from both her role as a Senator in the 92nd General Assembly and her role as Senator-elect in the 93rd General Assembly. The Democratic Legislative Committee for the 3rd Legislative District appointed Elga Jefferies to serve the remainder of Smith's term in the 92nd General Assembly and Mattie Hunter to serve Smith's term in the 93rd General Assembly.

== Death ==
On May 16, 2005, Margaret Smith died at her home in Chicago.
