= Cook County Board of Commissioners 3rd district =

- District
- District 3
- Current Board of Commissioners map, 3rd district highlighted in red
- Country: United States
- State: Illinois
- County: Cook
- Townships and equal jurisdictions: list: Chicago; Worth Township

Government
  - Type: District
  - Body: Cook County Board of Commissioners
  - Commissioner: Bill Lowry (D)

Cook County Board of Commissioners 3rd district is a single-member electoral district for the Cook County Board of Commissioners. It is currently represented by Bill Lowry, a Democrat.

== History ==
The district was established in 1994, when the board transitioned from holding elections in individual districts, as opposed to the previous practice of having two multi-member districts: one for ten members from the city of Chicago and another for seven members from suburban Cook County.

== Geography ==
=== 1994 boundaries ===
When the district was first established, it covered parts of the South Side of Chicago and southwest suburbs of Cook County.

=== 2001 redistricting ===
New boundaries were adopted in August 2001, with redistricting taking place following the 2000 United States census.

In regards to townships and equivalent jurisdictions, the district's redistricted boundaries included portions of the city of Chicago, as well as portions of Worth Township.

=== 2012 redistricting ===
The district, as redistricted in 2012 following the 2010 United States census, laid entirely within the city of Chicago, including part of the central city and the South Side.

The district was 21.95 square miles (14,046.55 acres).

=== 2022 redistricting ===
The district, as redistricted in 2022 following the 2020 United States census, continues to lay primary within the city of Chicago. It now also contains a small portion of Worth Township.

== Politics ==
All commissioners representing this district, since its inception, have been Democrats. The district has voted strongly Democratic in its Cook County Board of Commissioners elections.

== List of commissioners representing the district ==
Commissioner	Party	Years	Electoral history
Jerry Butler	Democratic	December 1994–December 2018	Previously served two terms as commissioner from Chicago at-large; elected in 1994, 1998, 2002, 2006, 2010, 2014
Bill Lowry	Democratic	December 2018–present	Elected in 2018 and 2022

== Election results ==
Cook County Board of Commissioners 3rd district general elections
Year	Winning candidate	Party	Vote (pct)	Opponent	Party	Vote (pct)
1994	Jerry "Iceman" Butler	Democratic		Clara Simms-Johnson	Republican	
1998	Jerry "Iceman" Butler	Democratic	72,279 (91.25%)	Nathan Peoples	Republican	6,928 (8.75%)
2002	Jerry "Iceman" Butler	Democratic	76,883 (100%)			
2006	Jerry "Iceman" Butler	Democratic	73,932 (89.86%)	Marie J. "Jenny" Wohadlo	Republican	8,340 (10.14%)
2010	Jerry "Iceman" Butler	Democratic	78,106 (88.84%)	Marie J. "Jenny" Wohadlo	Green	9,809 (11.16%)
2014	Jerry "Iceman" Butler	Democratic	77,354 (100%)			
2018	Bill Lowry	Democratic	101,576 (89.57%)	George Blakemore	Republican	11,834 (10.43%)
2022	Bill Lowry	Democratic	75,868 (100%)			
