= Elizabeth Coulson =

American politician

Member of the Illinois House of Representatives from the 17th district
- In office 1997 - 2011
- Preceded by: Gregg Goslin
- Succeeded by: Daniel Biss

Personal details
- Born: September 8, 1954 (age 71) Hastings, Nebraska
- Party: Republican
- Spouse: William
- Profession: Physical Therapist

Elizabeth Coulson (born September 8, 1954) is a former Republican member of the Illinois House of Representatives, representing the 17th district from 1997 to 2011.

== Personal background ==
Born in Hastings, Nebraska, Coulson received a B.S. in education from the University of Kansas in 1976, an ACPT in Physical Therapy from the Northwestern University Medical School in 1977 and an MBA from the Keller Graduate School of Management of DeVry University in 1985. From 1981 until 2002, she was an associate professor in the Department of Physical Therapy at the Chicago Medical School and rose to become the department chair. Coulson also received an ABD in Health Policy and Administration from the University of Illinois in 2004.

== Political career ==
Coulson was elected to the Illinois House of Representatives in 1996. She succeeded Gregg Goslin who was appointed as a caretaker after Kevin Hanrahan resigned during his first term. She ran for the Illinois's 10th congressional district seat being vacated by Mark Kirk, but lost to Bob Dold in the February 2nd, 2010, primary election. She backed Republican candidate Hamilton Chang, in his unsuccessful bid to replace her in the Illinois House of Representatives in the 17th district. On March 5, 2021, Illinois Governor J. B. Pritzker appointed Coulson to the Illinois Human Rights Commission for a term ending January 16, 2025. Her appointment was confirmed by the Illinois Senate on March 8, 2022.
