= Ted Lechowicz =

American politician

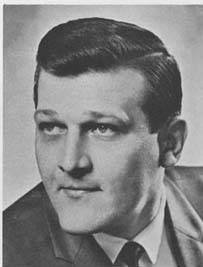
- Lechowicz, circa 1973

Member of the Cook County Board of Commissioners
- In office 1994–2002
- Preceded by: district established
- Succeeded by: Forrest Claypool
- Constituency: 12th district
- In office 1990–1994
- Succeeded by: district disestablished
- Constituency: Chicago

Member of the Illinois Senate
- In office 1983–1993

Member of the Illinois House of Representatives
- In office 1969–1983

Personal details
- Born: December 20, 1938 Chicago, Illinois, U.S.
- Died: January 5, 2009 (age 70) Chicago, Illinois, U.S.
- Party: Democratic
- Education: Wright Junior College; North Park University

Military service
- Allegiance: United States
- Branch/service: United States Army
- Rank: First lieutenant

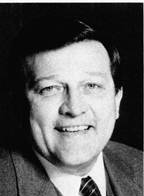
Lechowicz in the 1980s

Thaddeus S. "Ted" Lechowicz (December 20, 1938 – January 5, 2009) was an American politician and businessman.

== Biography ==
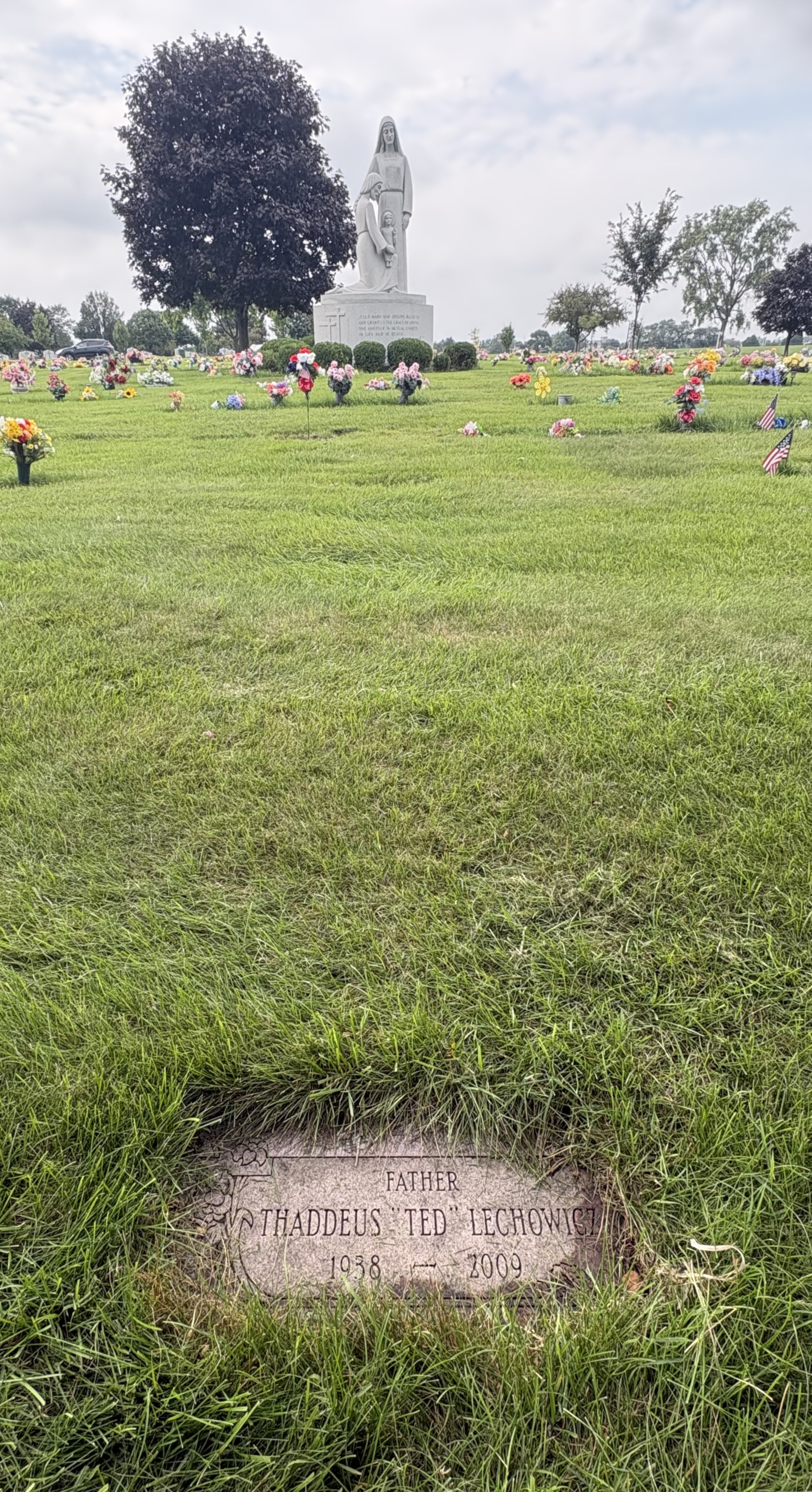
Lehowicz's grave at Maryhill Catholic Cemetery

Born in Chicago, Illinois, Lechowicz went to Weber High School in Chicago. He received his associate degree from Wright Junior College and then in 1960 received his bachelor's degree in economics from North Park University. Lechowicz also did graduate work at DePaul University. Lechowicz served in the United States Army and was a first lieutenant. He worked in systems analysis and programming for the Cook County, Illinois Circuit Courts and was involved with the Democratic Party. Lechowicz served in the Illinois House of Representatives from 1969 to 1983. He then served in the Illinois Senate from 1983 to 1993. Lechowicz also served in the Cook County Board of Commissioners from 1990 to 2002. Lechowicz died at his home in Chicago, Illinois from heart failure, and was buried at Maryhill Catholic Cemetery in Niles.
