= Gregg Goslin =

American politician

Member of the Cook County Board of Commissioners from the 14th district
- In office December 1998 – December 2018
- Preceded by: Richard Siebel
- Succeeded by: Scott R. Britton

Member of the Illinois House of Representatives from the 57th district
- In office February 1996 – January 1997
- Preceded by: Kevin Hanrahan
- Succeeded by: Elizabeth Coulson

Personal details
- Party: Republican
- Education: Southern Illinois University
- Profession: Real Estate Broker
- Website: Official Website

Gregg Goslin was a member of the Cook County Board of Commissioners for the 14th district which includes parts of Barrington, Inverness, Palatine, Rolling Meadows, Arlington Heights, Wheeling, Northbrook, Northfield and Glenview.

== Early life ==
Goslin received his bachelor's degree in political science and secondary education from Southern Illinois University in 1975 and completed postgraduate study in real estate.

== Early political career ==
In 1985, Goslin was elected the Township Supervisor for Northfield Township. He was elected in 1989 and 1993. He was elected Republican Committeemen for Northfield Township in 1994. During the 89th General Assembly, Republican incumbent Kevin Hanrahan resigned and Goslin was appointed to hold the seat for the remainder of his term in a caretaker capacity. The Republican candidate in the 1996 election, Elizabeth Coulson, succeeded him.

== Cook County Commissioner ==
Goslin was elected to the Board of Commissioners on November 3, 1998, to succeed Richard Siebel. He served for 20 years on the board before being defeated for reelection in November 2018 by Democrat Scott Britton. He was on multiple committees for both the Board of Commissioners and Forest Preserve District. In addition to his role as chairman of the Finance Committee for the Forest Preserve District of Cook County and chairman for the Botanic Garden committee, Goslin participated on the following committees:

- County Audit (Vice Chair)
- County Pension (Vice Chair)
- County Tax Delinquency (Vice Chair)
- County Criminal Justice
- County Finance
- Health and Hospitals
- County Homeland Security and Emergency Management
- County Law Enforcement
- County Legislation and Intergovernmental Relations
- County Roads & Bridges
- County Technology & Innovation
- County Zoning & Building
- FPD Audit
- FPD Capital Development
- FPD Law Enforcement
- FPD Legislation and Intergovernmental Relations
- FPD Real Estate
- FPD Recreation
- FPD Workers' Compensation
- FPD Zoological

== Post political career ==
Currently, Goslin is active member of the Glenview Chamber of Commerce, Independence Day Celebration Commission, Glenview Optimist Club, Glenview Naval Air Station Rescue Task Force and a board member at Thomas Place Senior housing. He is also a former officer of the Northwest Municipal Conference.
