= John Stroger =

American politician (1929–2008)

President of the Cook County Board of Commissioners
- In office December 5, 1994 – August 1, 2006
- Preceded by: Richard Phelan
- Succeeded by: Bobbie L. Steele

President of the National Association of Counties
- In office 1992–1993

Member of the Cook County Board of Commissioners
- In office December 1994 – August 1, 2006
- Preceded by: district established
- Succeeded by: William Beavers
- Constituency: 4th district
- In office December 1970 – December 1994
- Succeeded by: constituency abolished
- Constituency: Chicago

Personal details
- Born: May 19, 1929
- Died: January 18, 2008 (aged 78)
- Party: Democratic
- Occupation: Politician

John H. Stroger Jr. (May 19, 1929 – January 18, 2008) was an American politician who served from 1994 until 2006 as the first African-American president of the Cook County Board of Commissioners (the primary executive officer of Cook County, Illinois). A member of the Democratic Party. Stroger also served as a member of the Cook County Board of Commissioners (the legislative body of the county) from 1970 until 2006. He additionally served as president of the National Association of Counties from 1992 through 1993.

Cook County's Stroger Hospital was renamed in his honor.

== Early life ==
John Stroger was born May 19, 1929, in Helena, Arkansas. In 1953, he graduated from Xavier University in Louisiana with a B.S. in business administration.

== Early political career ==
In 1953, Stroger relocated to Chicago and became active in the Democratic Party organization in the South Side of Chicago. After only a year, Stroger was appointed as an assistant auditor in the Municipal Court of Chicago. Stroger then served as personnel director at the Cook County Jail from 1955 to 1961. Stroger attended law school at the DePaul University College of Law and graduated in 1965. While earning a law degree he worked for the financial director of the State of Illinois. In 1968, Stroger was elected 8th Ward committeeman.

== First six terms on the Cook County Board of Commissioners (1970–1994) ==
In 1970, Stroger was elected to the Cook County Board of Commissioners as one of several members representing Chicago. (at the time, ten members were elected to represent Chicago at-large, while another seven members were elected to represent suburban Cook County at-large).

In his time on the county board, Stroger spent time as a chair of every major committee (including finance, health, building and zoning). He sponsored legislation on the committee aimed at assisting minority- and female-owned businesses.

In 1980, Stroger unsuccessfully ran for the Democratic nomination in Illinois's 1st congressional district against incumbent Bennett Stewart. Both lost to Harold Washington.

Stroger served as president of the National Association of Counties from 1992 through 1993.

== County presidency and additional terms on the county board ==
In 1994, Stroger was both elected county board president while also winning re-election to the board. He would hold both positions simultaneously until 2006. The 1994 election was the first in which board members were elected to represent single-member districts, and Stroger was elected to represent the 4th district.

As president, ultimately Stroger completed much of what he set out to do when he campaigned in 1994. This included balancing the county's $2.9 billion budget. He also instituted a Juvenile Drug Court, appointed a Commission on Women's Issues and opened a new AIDS treatment and research facility. Stroger served on the Chicago Metropolitan Healthcare Council and the board of South Shore Hospital. The new Cook County Hospital was renamed the John H. Stroger Jr. Cook County Hospital after Stroger while he was serving as county board president.

In the 1990s, he was appointed by U.S. President Bill Clinton to serve as a member of the U.S. Advisory Commission on Intergovernmental Relations.

=== First term as president (1994–1998) ===
In the Democratic primary of the 1994 county board presidential election, Stroger defeated two opponents. Incumbent president Richard Phelan had forgone re-election that year in order to unsuccessfully run for Democratic nomination for governor, which left the county president race open. In the general election, Stroger trounced Republican Aurelia Pucinski. To the surprise of many "machine" watchers, he even beat her in many of Chicago's white ethnic wards.

Stroger successfully advocated for the county's purchase of the Brunswick Building, arguing that consolidating many county offices into the building would save the county money in the long-term.

=== Second term as president (1998–2002) ===
In the 1998 Democratic primary, he defeated a suburban challenger, Cook County commissioner Calvin Sutker.

=== Third term as president (2002–2006) ===
In 2002, Stroger had no Democratic primary challenger and went on to rout Republican challenger Christopher Bullock by a margin of more than two to one.

Stroger came under increased fire in the later years of his presidency for what his critics call a scandal- and patronage-ridden administration. Stroger supporters counterclaimed that he dedicated his public career to providing quality and affordable health care for the poorer residents of Cook County.

==== 2006 election, withdrawal, and resignation ====
In 2006, Stroger initially sought a fourth term as county president and as a board member. For president, was challenged in the Democratic primary by Cook County Commissioner Forrest Claypool. Claypool who ran as a reform candidate, and accused Stroger of presiding over a "bloated" government.

The 2006 election was among the most controversial in the colorful history of Cook County politics. Despite suffering a severe stroke just a week before the primary election and falling into brain death, John Stroger still managed to secure his party's support by a final margin of 53 percent to 47 percent over Claypool. The severity of Stroger's condition was concealed from voters both before the primary election and for three months thereafter, possibly allowing his primary victory and preventing independent opposition to the replacement Democratic candidate in the general election. Although he had overcome health complications in the past, questions still lingered regarding his ability to serve another term as Cook County Board President.

However, after securing the Democratic nomination, Stroger's health became an issue. Stroger had an extensive history of medical complications. He was a diabetic, had battled prostate cancer and underwent a quadruple bypass in 2001. In March 2006, he suffered a severe stroke which caused him to suffer partial paralysis. Other neurological complications also occurred. After the stroke, Stroger never again appeared in public. Details about Stroger's condition was released to the public through indirect disclosures. In July 2006, WBBM-TV reported that he was back in the hospital after suffering seizures. Stroger's son Todd broke a long public silence in December 2007, telling the Chicago Sun-Times that his father had been improving until the seizures began. Todd said, "it's [now] just a matter of making sure he's comfortable." He stated that, "he's not been better since [he began experiencing seizures].,"

Due to his health issues, in late-June Stroger withdrew and was replaced by his son Todd as the Democratic nominee for county president and by William Beavers as the Democratic nominee for the 4th district seat on the county board. Many Republicans and some Democrats characterized the nomination of Stroger's son as nepotism, and Claypool even told the Chicago Sun-Times that he would not vote in the November general election. In the general election, Todd Stroger faced a challenge in from Republican Tony Peraica –a vocal critic of the John Stroger administration. Chicago Mayor Richard M. Daley blasted Claypool (who was previously Daley's own chief of staff) for refusing to support Todd Stroger, and warned that in his refusal Claypool risked "destroying [his] political career". Todd Stroger received strong support from Mayor Daley and the Cook County Democratic Party. While Peraica did very well in suburban Cook County, Todd Stroger's strength among Chicago voters allowed him to win the election with 54% of the total vote.

In addition to ending his re-election campaigns, Stroger also resigned from his county offices effective August 1. He was replaced as president by Bobbie L. Steele (appointed as interim president).

== Personal life ==
John Stroger was a longtime member of St. Felicitas Catholic Church on the South Side of Chicago. He and his wife, Yonnie, were the parents of three children, two of whom survive him: son Todd and daughter Yonnie Lynn. Another son, Hans Eric, died a year after graduating from his father's alma mater, Xavier University of Louisiana. Todd Stroger succeeded John as Cook County Board president.

=== Death ===
John Stroger died on January 18, 2008, age 78. He cast an absentee ballot for Barack Obama in the Illinois Democratic Presidential Primary before he died.

Preceded by Richard Phelan	Cook County Board President; 1994–2006	Succeeded by Bobbie L. Steele
