= Bill Lowry =

American politician & lawyer

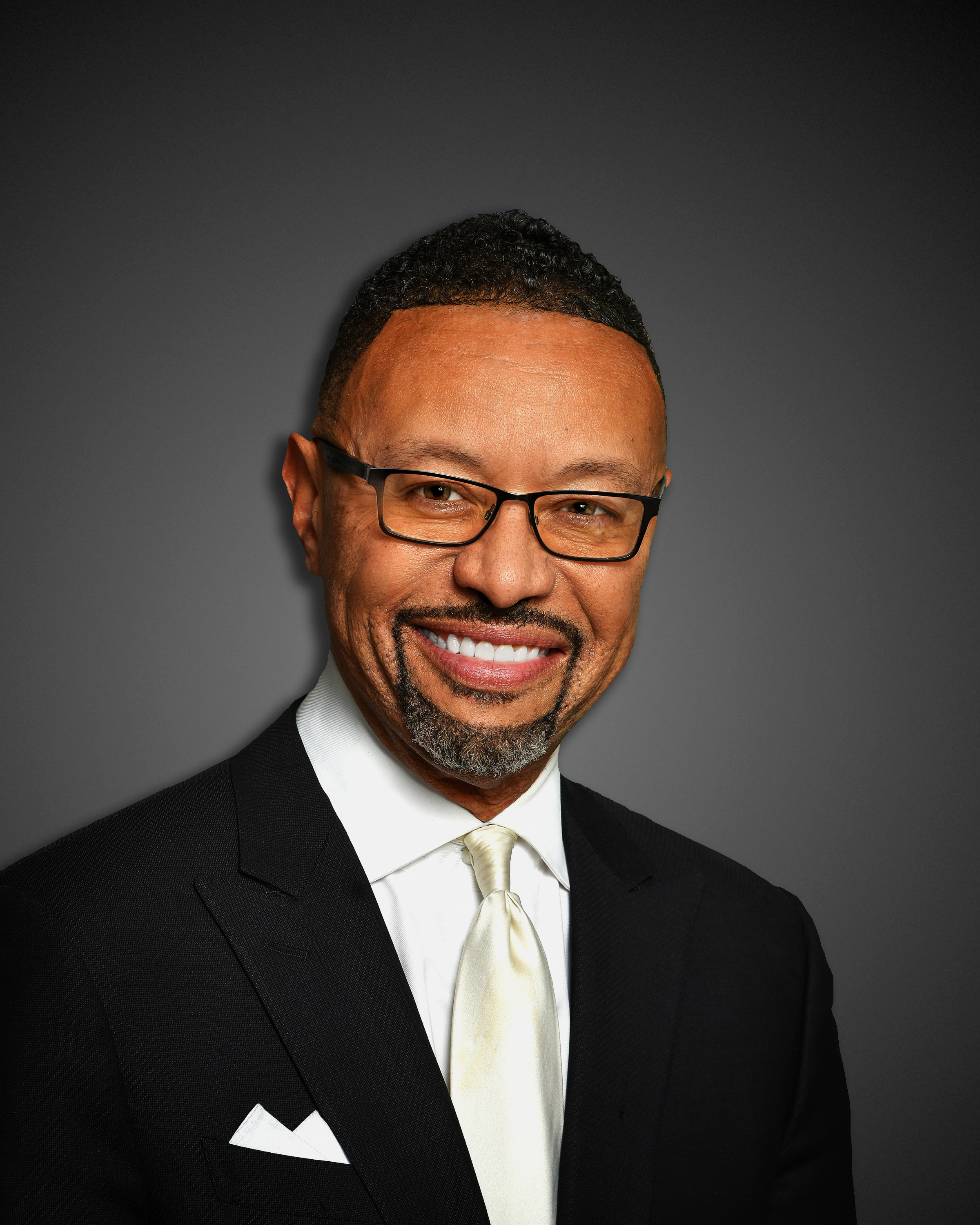
- Lowry, 2024

Member of the Cook County Board of Commissioners from the 3rd district
- Incumbent
- Assumed office December 3, 2018
- Preceded by: Jerry Butler

Personal details
- Born: October 21, 1962 (age 63) Chicago, Illinois, U.S.
- Party: Democratic
- Spouse: Cheryl Watson
- Children: 3
- Education: Lake Forest College (BA); Loyola University Chicago (JD)
- Website: Official website

William A. "Bill" Lowry (born October 21, 1962) is an American politician and lawyer. He is a member of the Democratic Party and currently serves as a commissioner for the 3rd district of Cook County. Lowry is also the president of Nyhan, Bambrick, Kinzie & Lowry, P.C., a law firm based in the Midwest.

In 2013, following the shooting of Hadiya Pendleton, a high school student who was killed near his home, Lowry founded The It's Time Organization (TITO), an anti-violence group specifically focused on addressing youth violence in the 3rd, 4th, and 5th Wards.

== Early life and education ==
Lowry was born and raised on the South Side of Chicago. He is the son of William E. Lowry Jr., a business executive and community leader, and Reverend Lil Lowry-Manning (1936–2018), a former educator and minister. He has a sister, Kim M. Pilcher, who works as an immigration analyst.

== Education ==
Lowry attended St. Francis De Sales High School, where he played point guard on the basketball team. Following a gunfire incident, he transferred to Francis W. Parker School. He later enrolled at Lake Forest College, majoring in history with a minor in political science, and earned his undergraduate degree in 1984. Subsequently, Lowry attended Loyola University Law School, where he graduated with a Juris Doctor degree in 1987. During his time at Lake Forest College, he became involved in local politics, joining a youth coalition that supported the 1983 mayoral campaign of former Chicago Mayor Harold Washington, where he participated in canvassing neighborhoods to engage with voters.

== Career ==
=== Legal career ===
Upon graduation from law school Lowry started his career in employer liability and workers' compensation law. Currently, Lowry serves as president and shareholder of Nyhan, Bambrick, Kinzie & Lowry, P.C., a law firm in downtown Chicago.

=== Political career ===
In 2017, Lowry announced his candidacy for the 3rd district seat on the Cook County Board of commissioners and emerged as the Democratic Party's nominee for the 3rd district seat. His opponent in the general election was George Blakemore, who represented the Republican Party. Lowry won the election with 89.57% of the total votes. He also won the 2022 election cycle, without opposition.

== Personal life ==
Lowry is married to Dr. Cheryl D. Watson-Lowry, a dentist. They have three children.

== Electoral history ==
General Election November 8, 2022 General Election for Cook County Board of Commissioners District 3
Party	Candidate	Votes	%
Democratic	Bill Lowry	75,868	100.00
Total votes		75,868	100

Democratic Primary Election June 28, 2022 Democratic Primary for Cook County Board of Commissioners District 3
Party	Candidate	Votes	%
Democratic	Bill Lowry	34,896	100.00
Total votes		34,896	100

General Election November 6, 2018 General Election for Cook County Board of Commissioners District 3
Party	Candidate	Votes	%
Democratic	Bill Lowry	101,576	89.6
Republican	George Blakemore	11,834	10.4
Total votes		113,410	100

Democratic Primary Election March 20, 2018 Democratic Primary for Cook County Board of Commissioners District 3
Party	Candidate	Votes	%
Democratic	Bill Lowry	17,814	33.3
Democratic	Patricia Horton	11,518	21.5
Democratic	Charise Williams	9,373	17.5
Democratic	Joshua Gray	5,145	9.6
Total votes		53,517	100

Republican Primary Election March 20, 2018 Democratic Republican Primary for Cook County Board of Commissioners District 3
Party	Candidate	Votes	%
Republican	George Blakemore	2,030	100.00
Total votes		2,030	100
