= Cook County Board of Commissioners 11th district =

- District
- District 11
- Current Board of Commissioners map, 11th district highlighted in red
- Country: United States
- State: Illinois
- County: Cook
- Townships and equivalent jurisdictions: list: Chicago; Stickney Township; Worth Township

Government
  - Type: District
  - Body: Cook County Board of Commissioners
  - Commissioner: John P. Daley (D)

Cook County Board of Commissioners 11th district is a single-member electoral district for the Cook County Board of Commissioners. Since its inception in 1994, the district has been represented by John P. Daley, a Democrat.

== History ==
The district was established in 1994, when the board transitioned from holding elections in individual districts, as opposed to the previous practice of having two multi-member districts: one for ten members from the city of Chicago and another for seven members from suburban Cook County.

== Geography ==
=== 1994 boundaries ===
When the district was first established, it represented parts of the Southwest Side of Chicago and the southwest suburbs of Cook County.

=== 2001 redistricting ===
New boundaries were adopted in August 2001, with redistricting taking place following the 2000 United States census.

In regards to townships and equivalent jurisdictions, the district's redistricted boundaries included portions of the city of Chicago and portions of the Stickney and Worth townships.

=== 2012 redistricting ===
The district, as redistricted in 2012 following the 2010 United States census, included Bedford Park, Bridgeview, Burbank, Chicago, Evergreen Park, Hometown, and Oak Lawn.

In regards to townships and equivalent jurisdictions, it included portions of the city of Chicago and portions of the Stickney and Worth townships.

The district was 42.59 square miles (27,259.26 acres).

=== 2022 redistricting ===
The district as redistricted in 2022, following the 2020 United States census, includes portions of the city of Chicago and portions of the Stickney and Worth townships.

== Politics ==
The district has only ever been represented by Democrat John P. Daley. He was won all of his elections by large margins.

== List of commissioners representing the district ==
Commissioner	Party	Years	Electoral history
John P. Daley	Democratic	December 1994–present	Previously served as commissioner from Chicago at-large; elected in 1994, 1998, 2002, 2006, 2010, 2014, 2018, 2022

== Election results ==
Cook County Board of Commissioners 11th district general elections
Year	Winning candidate	Party	Vote (pct)	Opponent	Party	Vote (pct)	Opponent	Party	Vote (pct)
1994	John P. Daley	Democratic							
1998	John P. Daley	Democratic	70,457 (76.49%)	William Walsh	Republican	21,654 (23.51%)			
2002	John P. Daley	Democratic	69,422 (75.85%)	William Walsh	Republican	22,099 (24.15%)			
2006	John P. Daley	Democratic	65,846 (79.49%)	Carl Segvich	Republican	16,986 (20.51%)			
2010	John P. Daley	Democratic	56,711 (69.97%)	Carl Segvich	Republican	24,340 (30.03%)			
2014	John P. Daley	Democratic	54,093 (68.61%)	Carl Segvich	Republican	24,744 (31.39%)			
2018	John P. Daley	Democratic	71,997 (73.56%)	Steven S. Graves	Republican	25,872 (26.44%)			
2022	John P. Daley	Democratic	48,435 (62.68%)	Declan J. Smith	Republican	26,029 (33.68%)	Brandon Sizelove	Libertarian	2,815 (3.64%)
