= Cook County Board of Commissioners 4th district =

- District
- District 4
- Current Board of Commissioners map, 4th district highlighted in red
- Country: United States
- State: Illinois
- County: Cook
- Townships and equivalent jurisdictions: list: Bloom Township; Chicago; Thorton Township; Worth Township

Government
  - Type: District
  - Body: Cook County Board of Commissioners
  - Commissioner: Stanley Moore (D)

Cook County Board of Commissioners 4th district is a single-member electoral district for the Cook County Board of Commissioners. It is currently represented by Stanley Moore, a Democrat.

== History ==
The district was established in 1994, when the board transitioned from holding elections in individual districts, as opposed to the previous practice of having two multi-member districts: one for ten members from the city of Chicago and another for seven members from suburban Cook County.

== Geography ==
Since its inception, the district has represented parts of the South Side of Chicago and the southwest suburbs of Cook County.

=== 1994 boundaries ===
In its initial 1994 iteration, the district encompassed parts of the South Side of Chicago as well as the southwest suburbs of Cook County.

=== 2001 redistricting ===
New boundaries were adopted in August 2001, with redistricting taking place following the 2000 United States census.

In regards to townships and equivalent jurisdictions, the district's redistricted boundaries included portions of the city of Chicago and portions of Thornton Township.

=== 2012 redistricting ===
The district, as redistricted in 2012 following the 2010 United States census, included parts of Burnham, Calumet City, Chicago, Dolton, Evergreen, Lansing, South Holland.

In regards to townships and equivalent jurisdictions, it included portions of the city of Chicago and portions of Bloom, Thornton and Worth townships.

The portion of Chicago represented by the district was in the extreme southwest edge of the city, including the Lake Calumet region.

The district was 57.57 square miles (36,844.00 acres).

=== 2022 redistricting ===
The district, as redistricted in 2022 following the 2020 United States census covers similar boundaries as its previous incarnation. It includes portions of the city of Chicago and portions of Bloom, Thornton, and Worth townships. The portion located in the Worth Township is an exceptionally small sliver of area.

== Politics ==
All commissioners representing this district, since its inception, have been Democrats. The district has voted strongly Democratic in its Cook County Board of Commissioners elections.

== List of commissioners representing the district ==
Commissioner	Party	Years	Electoral history
John Stroger	Democratic	December 1994–August 1, 2006	Elected in 1994, 1998, 2002; resigned on August 1, 2006
William Beavers	Democratic	November 2006–March 2013	Elected in 2006 and 2010; resigned in March 2013
Stanley Moore	Democratic	April 2013–present	Appointed in April 2013; elected in 2014, 2018, 2022

== Election results ==
Cook County Board of Commissioners 4th district general elections
Year	Winning candidate	Party	Vote (pct)	Opponent	Party	Vote (pct)
1994	John H. Stroger, Jr.	Democratic		Bruce Crosby	Harold Washington Party	
1998	John H. Stroger, Jr.	Democratic	91,847 (100%)			
2002	John H. Stroger, Jr.	Democratic	86,415 (93.12%)	Nathan Peoples	Republican	6,385 (6.88%)
2006	William Beavers	Democratic	78,252 (91.54%)	Ann Rochelle Hunter	Republican	7,234 (8.46%)
2010	William Beavers	Democratic	81,046 (90.58%)	Joseph A. Barton	Green	8,431 (9.42%)
2014	Stanley Moore	Democratic	75,192 (100%)			
2018	Stanley Moore	Democratic	88,736 (100%)			
2022	Stanley Moore	Democratic	67,481 (90.56%)	Lynn Franco	Republican	7,036 (9.44%)
