= Pamela Munizzi =

American politician (born 1954)

Pamela A. Munizzi (born June 16, 1954) is an American politician.

Born in Evergreen Park, Illinois, Munizzi received her bachelor's degree in criminal justice and law enforcement from the University of Illinois at Chicago. She also did graduate work at DePaul University and Illinois Institute of Technology. Munizzi was a Democrat and lived in Chicago, Illinois. In 1989, Munizzi was appointed to the Illinois House of Representatives when John P. Daley resigned from office. Then in 1992, she appointed to the Illinois Senate when John P. Daley again resigned from office. Munizzi was defeated in the 1992 primary by Margaret Smith. Munizzi served in the Illinois Senate until 1993.
