= William Beavers =

American politician (1935–2024)

Cook County Commissioner from the 4th district
- In office 2006–2013
- Preceded by: John Stroger
- Succeeded by: Stanley Moore

Member of the Chicago City Council from the 7th ward
- In office 1983–2006
- Succeeded by: Darcel Beavers

Personal details
- Born: February 21, 1935 Chicago, Illinois, U.S.
- Died: October 26, 2024 (aged 89)
- Party: Democratic
- Education: Harold Washington College

William M. Beavers (February 21, 1935 – October 26, 2024) was an American Democratic politician from Illinois. He served as a Chicago alderman, and later as a County Commissioner for the 4th district of Cook County, Illinois, which encompasses part of Chicago's South Side and southern suburbs. He has been convicted of federal tax evasion.

== Early life ==
Beavers was born and raised in Chicago's Kenwood-Oakland neighborhood, one of six children in an African-American family. Beavers' mother worked in retail and as a waitress. Beavers' father was a steel mill worker. Later, Beavers' father worked for a wrecking company and died in an accident on the job. Beavers was educated in the Chicagos and attended Harold Washington College. Beavers was a Chicago police officer for 21 years.

== Chicago alderman ==
Beavers was an alderman of the 7th Ward in Chicago's far south side. A member of the Democratic Party, he served in the Chicago City Council from 1983 to 2006. At the time of his death in October 2024, his family spokesperson Sean Howard noted that Beavers was "one of the most progressive African American Alderman in the Chicago City Council."

As a Chicago alderman, Beavers was appointed chairman of the Police and Fire Committee and later the Budget Committee. Among the most notable accomplishments of Beavers during his time on the Chicago City Council was his role in the creation of subcircuit judicial districts which allowed Black lawyers to run for judgeships on the city’s South Side, West Side and southern suburbs of the county.

Beavers said he had read Linda Lovelace's autobiography Ordeal, and had visited a topless beach and a nude beach, but had never visited a nudist camp, speaking on April 11, 2000 during testimony at a public hearing before the Finance Committee of the Chicago City Council on a proposed designation of a part of Walton Street in Chicago's Streeterville neighborhood, the location of the first Playboy Club, as "Hugh Hefner Way" in honor of Playboy founder Hugh Hefner.

== Cook County Commissioner ==
In 2006, Beavers reportedly engineered a complex deal concerning the retirement of Cook County Board President John Stroger, who suffered a stroke in March of that year. The deal called for Beavers to assume Stroger's County Commissioner seat, Stroger's son, Todd Stroger, to replace his father on the November 2006 ballot as County Board president, and for Chicago Mayor Richard M. Daley to appoint Beavers' daughter and chief of staff, Darcel Beavers, to her father's 7th Ward seat.

== Tax evasion conviction ==
On February 23, 2012, Beavers was indicted on four federal charges alleging he filed false tax returns and "endeavoring to obstruct and impede" the Internal Revenue Service. Following the indictment, he lashed out against the federal prosecutor. On March 21, 2013, Beavers was found guilty of tax evasion and faced a maximum three-year prison term on each of the four tax counts he was found guilty of. Beavers was sentenced to six months in jail, a $10,000 fine, and ordered to pay almost $31,000 in back taxes. In June 2014, the 7th Circuit Court of Appeals upheld his conviction.

== Personal life and death ==
Beavers had a son and two daughters. One daughter, Darcel, was his aldermanic chief of staff and was appointed to succeed Beavers as alderman. His son David served as an investigator for the Cook County State's Attorney's Office.

"I like to go to the gambling boats, maybe twice a week. Play the slots. That's my relaxation," Beavers said in profile in the Chicago Tribune Sunday Magazine in 2006.

Beavers died on October 26, 2024, at the age of 89.
