= Mariyana Spyropoulos =

American lawyer and politician

Clerk of the Circuit Court of Cook County
- Incumbent
- Assumed office December 4, 2024
- Preceded by: Iris Martinez

President of the Metropolitan Water Reclamation District of Greater Chicago Board of Commissioners
- In office January 2015 – January 2019
- Preceded by: Barbara McGowan (acting)
- Succeeded by: Kari Steele

Member of the Metropolitan Water Reclamation District of Greater Chicago Board of Commissioners
- In office August 5, 2009 – December 4, 2024
- Preceded by: Patricia Young
- Succeeded by: Beth McElroy Kirkwood; Sharon Waller

Personal details
- Born: Chicago, Illinois, U.S.
- Party: Democratic
- Education: Trinity Washington University (BA); Georgetown University (attended); University of Illinois, Chicago (JD); Loyola University Chicago (MBA)

Mariyana Spyropoulos is an American lawyer and politician currently serving as the clerk of the Circuit Court of Cook County. She was previously a member of the Metropolitan Water Reclamation District of Greater Chicago Board of Commissioners.

== Family and early life ==
Spyropoulos is the daughter of Erika and Ted Spyropoulos. Her father was a notable businessman, and a prominent member of the Greek American community. Her mother has served on the Illinois Arts Council.

Spyropoulos received her bachelor's from Trinity Washington University and did graduate work in American government at Georgetown University before eventually coming back to Chicago for her Juris Doctor from the John Marshall Law School (now known as the University of Illinois Chicago School of Law) in 1996 and later earned a Masters in Business Administration from Loyola University Chicago in 2007.

== Legal career ==
Spyropoulos first practiced law as a prosecutor, working as an assistant state's attorney in Cook County. She subsequently left this career and in 2005 opened the Chicago law firm of Miriyana Spyropoulos & Associates. Her legal work has involved environmental advocacy.

Spyropoulos has been a member of the American Bar Association, Illinois State Bar Association, Chicago Bar Association, Hellenic Bar Association, and Women's Bar Association.

== MWRD Board of Commissioners ==
In 2008, Spyropoulos unsuccessfully ran for a seat on the Metropolitan Water Reclamation District of Greater Chicago (MWRD) Board of Commissioners. Her candidacy had been endorsed by then-lieutenant governor Pat Quinn. On August 5, 2009, Quinn (now the governor) appointed Spyropoulos to a seat vacated by Patricia Young. She was elected to a full term in 2010, and re-elected in 2016 and 2022.

Spyropoulos served as the MWRD chairperson of finance from January 2013 through January 2015. She served as president of the board from January 2015 through 2019. She has served as a trustee of the MWRD Retirement Fund. She has served chairperson of the judiciary committee; chairperson of the Pension, Human Resources, and Civil Service Committee; chairperson of the finance committee; chairperson of the real estate development committee; vice chairperson of the ethics committee; vice chairperson of the public health and welfare committee. She was also the MWRD representative to the Public Building Commission, to which she was appointed by the board in January 2011. She was elected to the finance chairmanship in January 2013, and was elected board president January 2015.

Spyropoulos advocated for decreasing administrative costs and implementing resource recovery involving the conversion of waste into fertilizer.

In 2018, it was alleged that Spyropoulos had received $60,000 in campaign donations from contractors who did business with the MWRD.

In 2018, Spyropoulos gave her support to the creation of an inspector general position at the MWRD, instructing the agency's law department to draft a proposal. This position was ultimately created.

== Clerk of the Circuit Court of Cook County ==
=== Abandoned 2020 candidacy ===
Spyropoulos launched a campaign for the Democratic nomination in the 2020 Cook County Clerk of Courts election. Incumbent clerk Dorothy Brown was not seeking re-election, creating an open race. Spyropoulos withdrew from the race in September 2019, citing family reasons.

=== 2024 election ===
Spyropoulos successfully challenged incumbent Cook County Clerk of Courts Iris Martinez in the Democratic primary for the 2024 Cook County Clerk of Courts election.

Ahead of the primary, Spyropoulos was endorsed by the Cook County Democratic Party. She also received the endorsement of the editorial board of the Chicago Tribune. Spyropolous' campaign finances benefited from her family's wealth. Ahead of the primary, she personally loaned $1.2 million to her campaign committee. Her mother made an independent expenditure totally $78,000 to purchase billboard advertisements in support of the campaign.

Spyropolous won the general election in November 2024.

=== Tenure ===
Spyropolous was sworn-in on December 4, 2024.

== Awards and recognition ==
- 2017 Illinois Water Environment Association "Public Service Award"

== Electoral history ==
=== MWRD ===
2008

2008 MWRD Democratic primary
Party	Candidate	Votes	%
Democratic	Frank Avila (incumbent)	367,867	17.01
Democratic	Kathleen Therese Meany (incumbent)	336,047	15.54
Democratic	Cynthia M. Santos (incumbent)	334,427	15.47
Democratic	Mariyana T. Spyropolous	307,067	14.20
Democratic	Daine Jones	284,623	13.16
Democratic	Dean T. Maragos	212,967	9.85
Democratic	Derrick David Stinson	188,506	8.72
Democratic	Matthew Podgorski	130,748	6.05

2010

2010 MWRD Democratic primary
Party	Candidate	Votes	%
Democratic	Mariyana T. Spyropoulos (incumbent)	180,730	14.78
Democratic	Barbara McGowan (incumbent)	179,955	14.72
Democratic	Michael A. Alvarez	158,172	12.94
Democratic	Kari K. Steele	141,649	11.59
Democratic	Todd Connor	130,383	10.66
Democratic	Maureen Kelly	123,590	10.11
Democratic	Kathleen Mary O'Reilley	110,810	9.06
Democratic	Wallace Davis, III	98,694	8.07
Democratic	Stella B. Black	98,588	8.06
Total votes		1,222,571	100

2016 MWRD election
Party	Candidate	Votes	%
Democratic	Michael A. Alvarez	679,058	23.10
Democratic	Mariyana T. Spyropoulos (incumbent)	669,036	22.76
Democratic	Barbara McGowan (incumbent)	659,353	22.43
Republican	Paul Chialdikas	380,787	12.95
Republican	Jimmy Lee Tillman II	227,549	7.74
Green	Diana Horton	141,943	4.83
Green	John "Jack" Ailey	93,301	3.17
Green	Nadine Bopp	88,834	3.02
Total votes		2,939,861	100

2016

2016 MWRD Democratic primary
Party	Candidate	Votes	%
Democratic	Barbara McGowan (incumbent)	517,239	24.42
Democratic	Mariyana T. Spyropoulos (incumbent)	423,313	19.99
Democratic	Josina Morita	388,766	18.36
Democratic	Kevin McDevit	303,170	14.32
Democratic	Joseph Daniel Cook	321,814	15.20
Democratic	R. Cary Capparelli	163,482	7.72
Total votes		2,117,784	100

2016 MWRD election
Party	Candidate	Votes	%
Democratic	Barara McGowan (incumbent)	1,150,063	28.79
Democratic	Mariyana T. Spyropoulos (incumbent)	951,773	23.83
Democratic	Josina Morita	919,714	23.03
Green	Karen Roothaan	343,930	8.61
Green	George Milkowski	308,576	7.73
Green	Michael Smith	320,162	8.02
Total votes		3,994,218	100

2022

2022 MWRD Democratic primary
Party	Candidate	Votes	%
Democratic	Mariyana T. Spyropoulos (incumbent)	257,580	22.24
Democratic	Patricia Theresa Flynn	201,003	17.35
Democratic	Yumeka Brown	185,222	15.99
Democratic	Sharon Waller	149,165	12.88
Democratic	Precious W. Brady-Davis	126,672	10.94
Democratic	Frank Avila	99,815	8.62
Democratic	Rick Garcia	76,019	6.56
Democratic	Cristina P. Nonato	62,738	5.42
Total votes		1,158,214	100

2022 MWRD election
Party	Candidate	Votes	%
Democratic	Mariyana T. Spyropoulos (incumbent)	865,103	29.56
Democratic	Patricia Theresa Flynn	766,291	26.18
Democratic	Yumeka Brown	710,037	24.26
Republican	R. Cary Capparelli	365,671	12.49
Green	Mark E. Buettner	219,771	7.51
Total votes		2,926,813	100

=== Clerk of Courts ===
2024

Clerk of the Circuit Court of Cook County Democratic primary
Party	Candidate	Votes	%
Democratic	Mariyana T. Spyropoulos	329,635	65.17
Democratic	Iris Y. Martinez (incumbent)	176,195	34.83
Total votes		505,830	100.0

Cook County Clerk of the Circuit Court election
Party	Candidate	Votes	%
Democratic	Mariyana T. Spyropoulos	1,322,315	67.99
Republican	Lupe Aguirre	498,205	25.62
Libertarian	Michael Murphy	124,368	6.39
Total votes		1,944,888	100.0
Democratic hold			
