= Timothy F. Degnan =

American politician (1940–2022)

Timothy F. "Tim" Degnan (February 23, 1940 – November 20, 2022) was an American politician from Illinois.

== Early life and education ==
Born in Chicago, Illinois, Degnan went to St. Ignatius College Prep. He then went to University of Illinois and Illinois Institute of Technology.

== Political career ==
After Richard M. Daley was elected Cook County State's Attorney in the 1980 general election, Degnan was appointed by the 23rd District Democratic Legislative Committee to succeed Daley in the 81st General Assembly. Degnan served in the Illinois Senate from 1980 to 1989 and was a Democrat. In 1989, he served as intergovernmental affairs director for the mayor of Chicago, Richard M. Daley.

== Personal ==
Degnan died at his home in Oak Brook, Illinois on November 20, 2022.
