= Cook County Board of Commissioners 12th district =

Cook County Board of Commissioners 12th District
- District
- District 12
- Current Board of Commissioners map, 12th district highlighted in red
- Country: United States
- State: Illinois
- County: Cook
- Townships and equivalent jurisdictions: list: Chicago

Government
  - Type: District
  - Body: Cook County Board of Commissioners
  - Commissioner: Bridget Degnen (D)

Cook County Board of Commissioners 12th district is a single-member electoral district for the Cook County Board of Commissioners. The district is located entirely within the municipal boundaries of the city of Chicago. It is currently represented by Democrat Bridget Degnen.

== History ==
The district was established in 1994, when the board transitioned from holding elections in individual districts, as opposed to the previous practice of having two multi-member districts: one for ten members from the city of Chicago and another for seven members from suburban Cook County.

== Geography ==
=== 1994 boundaries ===
When the district was first established, it was located entirely within the city of Chicago, representing parts of the North and Northwest sides of the city.

=== 2001 redistricting ===
New boundaries were adopted in August 2001, with redistricting taking place following the 2000 United States census.

The district's new boundaries still were fully laid within the city of Chicago. It represented parts of the North and Northwest sides of the city.

=== 2012 redistricting ===
The district currently, as redistricted in 2012 following the 2010 United States census, in large part resembled the general geography it had in its previous, 2001, redistricting. It continued to lay entirely within the city of Chicago, representing parts of the city's North Side and Northwest Side.

The district was 19.11 square miles (12,229.79 acres).

=== 2022 redistricting ===
The district as redistricted in 2022, following the 2020 United States census, contains a portion of the city of Chicago.

== Politics ==
The district has only had Democratic commissioners. Only twice has another party run a nominee in an election for the district.

== List of commissioners representing the district ==
Commissioner	Party	Years	Electoral history
Ted Lechowicz	Democratic	December 1994–December 2002	Previously served two terms as commissioner from Chicago; elected in 1994 and 1998; lost reelection in 2002
Forrest Claypool	Democratic	December 2002–December 2010	Elected in 2002 and 2006
John Fritchey	Democratic	December 2010–December 2018	Elected in 2010 and 2014; lost reelection in 2018
Bridget Degnen	Democratic	December 2018–present	Elected in 2018 and 2022

== Election results ==
Cook County Board of Commissioners 12th district general elections
Year	Winning candidate	Party	Vote (pct)	Opponent	Party	Vote (pct)
1994	Thaddeus "Ted" Lechowicz	Democratic				
1998	Thaddeus "Ted" Lechowicz	Democratic	47,588 (100%)			
2002	Forrest Claypool	Democratic	53,457 (100%)			
2006	Forrest Claypool	Democratic	57,709 (100%)			
2010	John Fritchey	Democratic	50,219 (74.72%)	William C. "Bill" Miceli	Republican	16,987 (25.28%)
2014	John Fritchey	Democratic	51,499 (100%)			
2018	Bridget Degnen	Democratic	93,561 (100%)			
2022	Bridget Degnen	Democratic	80,278 (81.21%)	Xiaoli "Alice" Hu	Republican	18,571 (18.78%)
