= John Fritchey =

American politician

Member of the Cook County Board of Commissioners from the 12th district
- In office 2010 – 2018
- Preceded by: Forrest Claypool
- Succeeded by: Bridget Degnen

Member of the Illinois House of Representatives from the 11th district
- In office 1996–2010
- Preceded by: Rod Blagojevich
- Succeeded by: Kathleen C. Moore

Personal details
- Born: March 2, 1964 (age 62) Bossier City, Louisiana, U.S.
- Party: Democratic
- Education: University of Michigan (B.A.); Northwestern University (J.D.)
- Profession: Attorney

John Alden Fritchey IV (born March 2, 1964) is a former Democratic Cook County Commissioner of the Cook County Board of Commissioners who represented the 12th district in Chicago from 2010 until 2018 and was a Democratic State Representative in the Illinois House of Representatives, representing the 11th District in Chicago from 1997 to 2010. He additionally served as the elected Democratic Committeeman for Chicago's 32nd Ward from 2008 to 2012. According to the Arab-American Institute, Fritchey was one of the longest-serving Arab-American officials in the United States. He is presently President of F4 Consulting, Ltd. In 1998, he created the John Fritchey Youth Foundation, designed to create educational and recreational opportunities for local children through the sponsorship of academic and sports programs. He has additionally supported the Chicago Special Olympics as a repeated participant in the annual Polar Plunge. He presently serves on the Board of Directors of Chicago Gateway Green, a non-profit, public-private partnership dedicated to the greening and beautification of Chicago's expressways, gateways and neighborhoods through landscape enhancement, litter and graffiti removal and the installation of public art.

== Early life and education ==
John Fritchey was born at Barksdale Air Force Base in Bossier City, Louisiana. His father, John Alden Fritchey III, was a United States Air Force Vietnam veteran and a native of Olney, Illinois, home to three generations of his family, while his mother emigrated from Oujda, Morocco.

Fritchey and his mother moved to Chicago where he attended grammar school and high school at The Latin School of Chicago on a hardship scholarship. He then earned his bachelor's degree in Economics in 1986 from the University of Michigan before returning to Chicago to earn his J.D. degree from Northwestern University Pritzker School of Law in 1989.

== Professional career ==
After graduating from law school, Fritchey accepted a position as an Illinois Assistant Attorney General representing the State of Illinois in both state and federal court from 1989 to 1991. Fritchey is an attorney in private practice Fritchey also taught as an adjunct lecturer in political science at Northwestern University. Fritchey is a lobbyist registered with the State of Illinois and the City of Chicago.

On February 18, 2021, WBEZ reported that Fritchey was one of 246 applicants for ten associate judgeships with the Cook County Circuit Court.

== Illinois State Representative ==
In 1996, Fritchey was elected to the Illinois House of Representatives at age 32 becoming the first Moroccan-American elected official in the State of Illinois and likely the first Moroccan-American elected official in the Country. From the moment he entered the General Assembly in Springfield, he began pushing for serious, common sense reforms that brought the respect of good government and consumer's rights groups from all over the ideological spectrum. In 2003, John worked with then-State Senator Barack Obama to pass the most comprehensive ethics bill in the history of Illinois. He was a champion of many issues, from ethics reform to consumer protection to health care to fairer taxes who consistently showed that he was not afraid to buck party leadership and stand up for his constituents and all of Illinois.

He additionally helped pass legislation that strengthened environmental preservation laws, expanded protected wilderness areas, and increased investment in renewable energy. The Illinois Environment Council honored John for his 100% voting record on environmental issues impacting the community and its resources.

In 2000, as a result of his effective leadership and centrist views, the national Democratic Leadership Council, a national voice for a reform movement reshaping American politics by moving it beyond the old left-right debate, named John as one of their "100 Rising Stars to Watch" in the country. In 2003, John was one of a select group to receive this honor for a second time.

Fritchey was Chairman of the Consumer Protection Committee from 1999 to 2002. John later served as the Chairman of the Civil Judiciary Committee and as Vice-Chairman of the Business & Occupational Licenses Committee. In addition to serving in these leadership positions, John sat on the Financial Institutions, Insurance, and Mass Transit Committees and was appointed to the Joint Committee on Administrative Rules.

As State Representative, Fritchey addressed a variety of issues on behalf of Illinois residents. These included:

- In 2002, as Chairman of the Consumer Protection, Fritchey took on the financial institutions by introducing legislation to rein in escalating ATM fees.
- In response to continuing corruption scandals in state politics involving pay-to-play dealmaking, Fritchey introduced House Bill 1, legislation to prevent politicians from receiving campaign donations from people or businesses interested in securing state grants or contracts.
- In a first of its kind in the United States, Fritchey drafted and passed legislation creating a registry for anyone found guilty of violent offenses toward children as a way to reduce future acts of violence by convicted offenders.
- With the support of Planned Parenthood and the ACLU, Fritchey introduced legislation to repeal Illinois Parental Notice Act and replace it with the Adolescent Health Care Safety Act.
- Fritchey wrote and passed legislation ending the pension abuse by elected officials that was costing Cook County residents millions of dollars, stating that "taxpayers in Cook County deserve the same accountability from their elected officials as do the taxpayers in every other county in Illinois. Closing this loophole is one step in that direction."
- Following the arrest of former Illinois Governor Rod Blagojevich, Fritchey was the first to openly call for the impeachment of Blagojevich and was a member of the Special Investigative Committee that ultimately drafted the impeachment resolution against Blagojevich.

== Democratic campaign for U.S. House of Representatives ==
Fritchey was one of many candidates who ran for former US Representative Rahm Emanuel's seat in 2009 Illinois's 5th congressional district special election. In the primary election on March 3, 2009, Fritchey finished second to Mike Quigley in the 12-way race for the Democratic Party nomination.

== Chicago ward committeeman ==
On February 5, 2008, Fritchey was elected as the Democratic Committeeman for Chicago's 32nd Ward, responsible for handling the Party political operations (voter registration, election day operations, etc.) within the ward.

== Cook County Commissioner ==
In 2010, Fritchey left the Illinois General Assembly in order to run for a seat on the Cook County Board of Commissioners, formerly held by Forrest Claypool. Fritchey was endorsed by both Claypool and Congressman Mike Quigley. Fritchey won the election with 75 percent of the vote.

As commissioner of the 12th district, Fritchey addressed a variety of issues on behalf of Cook County residents. These included:

- Opposition to the sales tax and sugary beverage tax - Fritchey sponsored legislation to roll back the County sales tax and voted against County Board President Toni Preckwinkle's legislation to later increase the sales tax again. He was also the first commissioner to come out against the proposed sugary drink tax and helped lead the fight to repeal it.
- Property tax/sales tax freezes to 2020 - In 2020, Fritchey drafted and helped pass the Cook County Taxation Predictability and Long-Term Fiscal Forecasting Amendment, which froze the county's property and sales tax rates until January 1, 2020.
- Consolidated offices of the Recorder of Deeds and the County Clerk - Fritchey drafted and passed legislation that gave voters the option to eliminate the office of the Recorder of Deeds and merge its functions into the office of the County Clerk. In the November 2016 general election, voters overwhelmingly approved the ballot referendum, and the two offices will be merged by 2020. This historic legislation was the first of its kind in Cook County in over 40 years.
- City/County collaboration - Fritchey was selected to serve on a city/county joint-collaboration committee assembled by Mayor Rahm Emanuel and Board President Toni Preckwinkle, created to increase government efficiency. After analyzing and reporting on duplicative spending, the committee paved the way for collaborations between the two governments that have secured almost $70 million in savings.
- Parental Leave Reform - Fritchey's legislation to update the county's parental leave policy allows new mothers and fathers to claim disability in order to receive paid parental leave, enabling them to focus on the needs of their families. Fritchey fought to provide paid parental leave for county employees and thought the current policy was an antiquated notion and was not one that was aligned with where policy setters wanted to be, where employers should strive to be, and did not support the nature of attracting and retaining qualified employees.
- Government transparency - As chairman of the board's Technology and Innovation Committee, Fritchey passed a major initiative to bring meaningful transparency reforms to Cook County. The Open Cook County Plan is aimed at making county government data and information publicly available so residents can more effectively understand, interact with and improve government.
- Commonsense marijuana policies - During his tenure in the Legislature, Fritchey co-sponsored the bill that created Illinois' recently enacted medical cannabis programs. Fritchey led the successful call for the City of Chicago to enact an ordinance allowing Chicago police officers to issue tickets for possession of small amounts of marijuana rather than arresting offenders. In 2017, Fritchey drafted and passed legislation placing a referendum on the ballot to allow voters to weigh in on the legalization of recreational use of cannabis in Illinois. The measure received the support of 63% of voters.
- Animal welfare - A tireless animal rights advocate, Fritchey wrote and introduced the ordinance that bans retail sales of puppy mill dogs, ordered an audit of the Cook County Animal Care & Control department and passed legislation that created a countywide Animal Abuse Registry.

Fritchey left the office upon the swearing-in of his successor, attorney and successful 2018 Democratic primary challenger Bridget Degnen.
