= John Vitek =

American politician and businessman

Member of the Illinois House of Representatives

Personal details
- Party: Democratic

John M. Vitek (July 8, 1907 – February 24, 1989) was an American politician and businessman.

Born in Chicago, Illinois, Vitek went to Tilden Technical High School. He was in the real estate and insurance business. From 1961 to 1967 and from 1975 to 1987, Vitek served in the Illinois House of Representatives. Vitek was a Democrat. Vitek died at a nursing facility in Park Ridge, Illinois.
