= Scott R. Britton =

American local government official

Scott Britton

Member of the Cook County Board of Commissioners from the 14th district
- Incumbent
- Assumed office December 3, 2018
- Preceded by: Gregg Goslin

Personal details
- Born: Macon, Illinois, U.S.
- Party: Democratic
- Education: Millikin University (BA); University of Illinois, Urbana-Champaign (JD)

Scott R. Britton is an elected American local government official in Cook County, Illinois.

He is currently a member of the Cook County Board of Commissioners representing the 14th District of Cook County which includes Arlington Heights, Barrington, Glencoe, Glenview, Inverness, Kenilworth, Northbrook, Northfield, Palatine, Prospect Heights, Rolling Meadows, Wheeling, Wilmette and Winnetka, as well as parts of Buffalo Grove, Deer Park and Deerfield. Prior to his tenure on the Board of Commissioners, Britton served as a village trustee in Glenview.

== Personal life ==
Britton grew up in Macon, Illinois. He received his B.A. at Millikin University, followed by his J.D. at the University of Illinois at Urbana-Champaign. Following his law school graduation in 1985, Britton moved to Chicago. In 1999, Britton moved to the Glenview area. He served on numerous boards of charitable organizations including North Suburban United Way and Youth Services of Glenview/Northbrook.

In addition to his position as commissioner, Britton is a practicing lawyer at his law firm Ford & Britton PC.

== Public service ==
In 2002, Britton was appointed to the Glenview's District 34 Board of Education and in 2003 was elected to a full term. Following his exit from the school board, Britton was elected as a trustee on Glenview's village board in 2007. He served as a trustee for three terms, before resigning to begin his role at Cook County Commissioner.

== Cook County Commissioner ==
Britton was sworn in on December 3, 2018 after beating Republican incumbent Gregg Goslin. Britton shares district office space in Glenview with Illinois State Senator Laura Fine and Illinois State Representative Jennifer Gong-Gershowitz.

He is chairman of the Finance Subcommittee on Litigation and Legislation and Intergovernmental Relations for both Cook County and Forest Preserve District, and chairman of the Botanic Garden committee, Legislation Intergovernmental Relations committee (Cook County and Forest Preserve District), and the Chicago Botanic Garden committee. Additionally, he is a member of the county's Asset Management, Audit, Business and Economic Development, Criminal Justice, Environment & Sustainability, Finance, Litigation, Health and Hospitals, Homeland Security and Emergency Management, Law Enforcement, Rules and Administration, Transportation, Veterans, and Zoning & Building committees. For the Forest Preserve District, Britton serves as a member of the Capital Development, Environment & Sustainability, Litigation, Law Enforcement and Real Estate committees.

Britton's first piece of legislation, co-sponsored by Larry Suffredin, Cook County Board was Tobacco 21. Passing unanimously, the legislation bars the sale of tobacco products - including e-cigarettes and vaping products - to anyone under the age of 21 in unincorporated areas in and non-home rule municipalities.

Britton also came out in support of Cook County Assessor Fritz Kaegi's legislation urging data modernization for property tax assessments, asserting that the passage of SB1379 and HB2217 would mean more certainty for the county's smaller taxing bodies from having to pay large refunds if numerous assessment appeals are filed. Britton hosted a listening session in Palatine with Assessor Kaegi, where residents were able to discuss data modernization, appeals and the upcoming triennial reassessment. Both Britton and Kaegi have committed to making the property tax assessment process more fair and transparent.

In April 2019, Cook County Health opened a new, state of the art facility in Arlington Heights, long supported by Britton as a major step toward health equity and parity for Cook County residents.

In October 2019, Commissioner Britton sponsored the Voting Opportunity and Translation Equity (VOTE) Ordinance. The ordinance requires the county clerk to offer fully translated ballots Korean, Tagalog, Polish, Russian, Ukrainian, Arabic, Gujarati, and Urdu.

Commissioner Britton was a main sponsor of the Cook County Residential Tenant Landlord Ordinance. It was passed unanimously by the Cook County Board of Commissioners at the January board meeting. Commissioner Britton's legislation offers protections similar to those that exist for renters in the City of Chicago.

In November 2022, Commissioner Britton bested Benton Howser to earn a second term representing the 14th District.

In November 2026, Commissioner Britton ran uncontested, securing a third term representing the 14th District.
