= Cook County Board of Commissioners 14th district =

- District
- District 14
- Current Board of Commissioners map, 14th district highlighted in red
- Country: United States
- State: Illinois
- County: Cook
- Townships: list: New Trier; Northfield; Palatine; Wheeling

Government
  - Type: District
  - Body: Cook County Board of Commissioners
  - Commissioner: Scott R. Britton (D)

Cook County Board of Commissioners 14th district is a single-member electoral district for the Cook County Board of Commissioners. It is currently represented by Scott R. Britton, a Democrat.

== History ==
The district was established in 1994, when the board transitioned to holding elections in individual districts, as opposed to the previous practice of having two multi-member districts: one for ten members from the city of Chicago and another for seven members from suburban Cook County.

== Geography ==
=== 1994 boundaries ===
When the district was first established, it covered parts of the north and northwest suburbs of Cook County.

=== 2001 redistricting ===
New boundaries were adopted in August 2001, with redistricting taking place following the 2000 United States census.

In regards to townships, the district's redistricted boundaries included parts of Barrington, Niles, Northfield, Palatine, and Wheeling townships. The district contained the entirety of both the Barrington and Palatine townships

=== 2012 redistricting ===
The district, as redistricted in 2012 following the 2010 United States census, included parts of Arlington Heights, Barrington, Buffalo Grove, Deerfield, Deer Park, Glencoe, Glenview, Golf, Hoffman Estates, Inverness, Mount Prospect, Northfield, Northbrook, Palatine, Prospect Heights, Rolling Meadows, Schaumburg, Wheeling, and Wilmette.

In regards to townships, the district's boundaries included parts of Niles, Northfield, Palatine, and Wheeling townships. It is located in northern Cook County.

The district was 90.32 square miles (57,806.14 acres).

=== 2022 redistricting ===
The district as redistricted in 2022, following the 2020 United States census, covers the entirety of New Trier and Northfield Townships, as well as large portions of Palatine and Wheeling Townships.

== Politics ==
From 1994 until 2018, the district was represented by Republicans. The district was considered to be a Republican stronghold during this time. In the 2016 United States presidential election, the Democratic ticket of Hillary Clinton and Tim Kaine won a strong victory in the district over the Republican ticket of Donald Trump and Mike Pence. The commissioner of the district flipped to the Democratic Party in 2018, a year which saw an overall strong performance by the Democratic Party in that year's elections in Illinois and an unprecedentedly strong and well-funded effort by the Cook County Democratic Party to target the district.

== List of commissioners representing the district ==
Commissioner	Party	Years	Electoral history
Richard Siebel	Republican	December 1994–December 1998	Previously served as commissioner from suburban Cook County at-large; elected in 1994
Gregg Goslin	Republican	December 1998–December 2018	Elected in 1998, 2002, 2006, 2010, 2014; lost reelection in 2018
Scott R. Britton	Democratic	December 2018–present	Elected in 2018 and 2022

== Election results ==
Cook County Board of Commissioners 14th district general elections
Year	Winning candidate	Party	Vote (pct)	Opponent	Party	Vote (pct)
1994	Richard Siebel	Republican	49,280 (66.08%)	Kelly Ann Sheehan	Democratic	25,302 (33.93%)
1998	Gregg Goslin	Republican	45,781 (59.27%)	Joyce Thompson Fitzgerald	Democratic	31,458 (40.73%)
2002	Gregg Goslin	Republican	51,691 (61.15%)	Allan M. Monat	Democratic	32,836 (38.85%)
2006	Gregg Goslin	Republican	49,400 (53.80%)	Michelene "Mickie" Polk	Democratic	42,426 (46.20%)
2010	Gregg Goslin	Republican	60,664 (61.89%)	Jennifer Bishop Jenkins	Democratic	37,357 (38.11%)
2014	Gregg Goslin	Republican	66,217 (100%)			
2018	Scott R. Britton	Democratic	62,792 (54.19%)	Gregg Goslin	Republican	53,079 (45.81%)
2022	Scott R. Britton	Democratic	67,575 (61.28%)	Benton Howser	Republican	42,703 (38.72%)
