= Stanley Moore (politician) =

American politician

Member of the Cook County Board of Commissioners from the 4th district
- Incumbent
- Assumed office April 11, 2013
- Preceded by: William Beavers

Personal details
- Party: Democratic
- Spouse: Lisa
- Children: 2
- Education: Southern Illinois University, Carbondale (BA)

Stanley Moore is a member of the Cook County Board of Commissioners who has represented the 4th district since his appointment on April 11, 2013. The 4th district covers both Chicago and its suburbs. It includes the Chicago neighborhoods of Auburn Gresham, Avalon Park, Calumet Heights, Chatham, East Side, Hegewisch, Pullman, Roseland, South Chicago, South Deering, and the suburbs of Burnham, Calumet City, Evergreen Park, and Lansing. Stanley Moore developed vital experience as an executive in government that included the oversight of major construction, transportation, and urban planning initiatives. As a Project Director with the Cook County Office of Capital Planning and Policy, he managed several construction projects and led the planning and development process on initiatives that were vital to the success of the county’s Capital Improvement Program. Moore also served as Director with the Illinois Department of Transportation (IDOT) and worked to ensure that diversity guidelines were implemented in all of IDOT’s projects, programs, and contractual services.

In addition to his work in the public sector, Stanley Moore has spent considerable time working for several community-based organizations. While serving as Assistant Area Development Director of the United Negro College Fund (UNCF) Inc., he was an integral part of organizing special events, fundraising, and expanding the alumni network of the organization. He also worked at the Henry Booth House as the Director of Development, where he was able to impact the community by ensuring the continuation of essential social services in targeted areas of Chicago. Prior to this, he served as the Division Director of the United Way of Chicago, where he managed more than $10 million in charitable giving, established new funding initiatives for the organization, and developed educational workshops for corporate sponsors which became the “in-house” model for soliciting corporations throughout the city.

Stanley Moore began his career as the Legislative Budget Analyst for Illinois Senate President Emil Jones, Jr. While working for the Senate leader, his chief responsibility was researching and reviewing background data for the Senate Appropriations and Substantive Committees. He earned his B.A. in Political Science from Southern Illinois University and is a member of Alpha Phi Alpha fraternity, Illinois Masonic Lodge, and a member of Third Baptist Church and Pilgrim Baptist Church. A native Chicagoan, Stanley Moore currently resides in the Washington Heights community with his wife Lisa and daughters Alexis and Tyler.

On the Cook County Board of Commissioners, in collaboration with fellow commissioner Dennis Deer, Moore wrote legislation which was passed in December 2020 to make Juneteenth a paid holiday in Cook County.
