= Bridget Degnen =

American politician

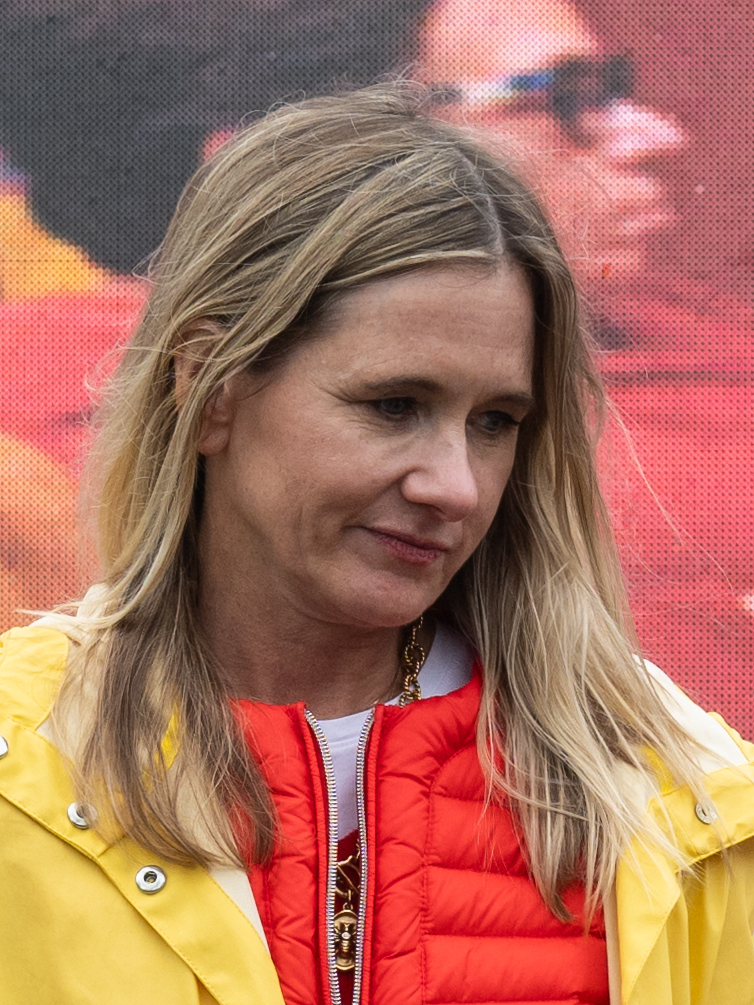
- Degnen in 2025

Member of the Cook County Board of Commissioners from the 12th district
- Incumbent
- Assumed office December 3, 2018
- Preceded by: John Fritchey

Personal details
- Born: September 6, 1972 (age 52); Chicago, Illinois, U.S.
- Political party: Democratic
- Spouse: Mark Degnen
- Children: 1
- Education: University of Dayton (BS); Loyola University Chicago (JD)

Bridget Degnen (born September 6, 1972) is an American politician serving as a member of the Cook County Board of Commissioners representing the 12th District. She was elected to the position in 2018. The 12th District is entirely within the city of Chicago, representing parts of the city's North Side and Northwest Side.

== Early life and education ==
Degnen was born and raised in the Edgebrook neighborhood on Chicago's northwest side. In 1994, she graduated from University of Dayton with an engineering degree, having majored in environmental engineering and minored in industrial engineering. Following two years of service in the United States Peace Corps in Mali, West Africa, she returned to Chicago and earned her Juris Doctor from the Loyola University Chicago School of Law.

== Career ==
Degnen was elected to the Cook County Board of Commissioners following the 2018 Election after defeating incumbent Commissioner John Fritchey in the March 20, 2018 primary election. She was unopposed in the November 6, 2018 general election.

== Personal life ==
Bridget Degnen is married to Mark Degnen and has one child.
