= Samantha Steele (politician) =

American politician (born 1979)

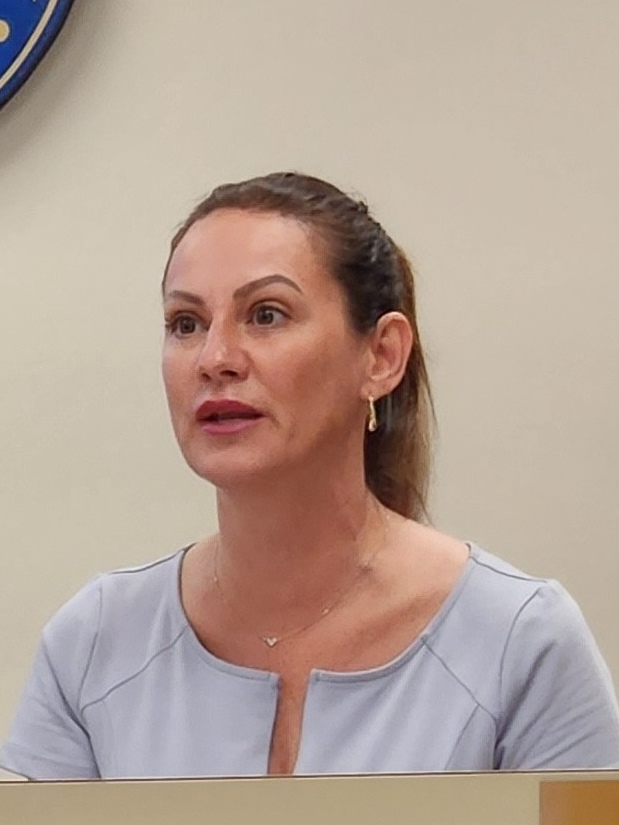
- Steele, in 2023

Member of the Cook County Board of Review from the 2nd district
- Incumbent
- Assumed office December 5, 2022
- Preceded by: Michael Cabonargi

Personal details
- Born: March 31, 1979 (age 47)
- Party: Democratic
- Education: Purdue University (attended); Kent Institute of Art and Design (BA)

Samantha Steele (born March 31, 1979) is an American politician serving as the Commissioner for the 2nd District of the Cook County Board of Review in Illinois since 2022. A member of the Democratic Party, she previously served on the Lake County Property Tax Assessment Board of Appeals in Indiana from 2020 to 2025, and as the Assessor of Tippecanoe County, Indiana from 2007 to 2010.

== Early life and education ==
Steele graduated from McCutcheon High School in Lafayette, Indiana, in 1997. She later attended Purdue University and earned a bachelor's degree from the Kent Institute of Art & Design.

== Political career ==
Samantha Steele served one term as Tippecanoe County Assessor in Indiana, elected in 2006 and served from January 1, 2007, to December 31, 2010. In the 2010 general election, Steele lost re-election as Tippecanoe County Assessor to Republican Linda Phillips, receiving 34.34% of the vote to Phillips's 46.31%.

In 2022, Steele was elected as the Commissioner for the 2nd District of the Cook County Board of Review in Illinois. Her tenure in this role has been marked by multiple public controversies.

Samantha Steele served on the Lake County, Indiana Property Tax Assessment Board of Appeals from 2020 until January 2025, when she left the tax appeal board while Indiana lawmakers were considering a residency requirement for Indiana PTABOA members. Steele was living in Illinois at the time while she was serving on the Indiana tax board. The law passed, and now Indiana tax board of appeals members must reside in Indiana.

In April 2025, Steele announced her intention to run for Cook County Assessor. In July 2025, she instead decided to seek re-election to the Board of Review. Steele sought the endorsement of the Cook County Democratic Party for reelection, but was defeated by challenger Liz Nicholson.

== Controversies ==
=== Hiring of Jon Snyder ===
In December 2022, Steele hired Jon Snyder, a former Portage, Indiana assessor, as an analyst for commercial property tax appeals. Snyder had recently pleaded guilty to a federal misdemeanor tax-related charge. Steele initially defended the hiring, but after Snyder's background was publicly revealed, he was placed on unpaid leave. Steele ultimately fired Snyder from his position in December 2024.

=== Wrongful termination lawsuit ===
On July 2, 2024, Frank Calabrese, an appeals analyst and communications director in Steele's office, filed a federal whistleblower lawsuit against the Cook County Board of Review, Steele, and her chief of staff. Calabrese alleged he was terminated on May 20, 2024, shortly after twice meeting with investigators from the county's Office of the Independent Inspector General about Steele and her aide, and after he declined to reveal to Steele what he had told investigators. He further alleged he was pressured “to engage in political activity” against the other two Board of Review commissioners and was punished for seeking legal guidance from the board's general counsel after Steele directed him to draft and distribute a memo to elected officials about the Chicago Bears’ Arlington Heights tax appeal. According to board records cited in reporting, Calabrese earned nearly $89,000 annually at the time. His attorney characterized the matter as a “classic whistleblower case.”

Context around the Bears matter had already drawn formal warnings from the Board of Review's top lawyer. In March 2024, general counsel and chief ethics officer Cristin Duffy admonished Steele in a letter to the Chicago Bears, calling it “premature and inappropriate” for Steele to have discussed pending deliberations with media before a final vote—after Steele publicly asserted analysts had agreed to a $138 million valuation (a claim a fellow commissioner's office denied). In October 2024, the county inspector general recommended ethics training after finding that “BOR Official A” (identified in reporting as Steele) violated board ethics rules and state property-tax impartiality requirements by disclosing confidential information about the Bears’ appeal and making comments indicative of bias; the same report noted interviews with a Steele office employee whose identity reporting tied to Calabrese and his subsequent lawsuit.

In January, 2025, the Cook County Board of Commissioners approved a $180,000 settlement to resolve Calabrese's lawsuit, with 14 commissioners voting in favor, none opposed and one abstention. County records showed more than $125,000 would be paid directly to Calabrese, with the remainder to his counsel. Calabrese said he felt vindicated by the outcome; the agreement included no admission of wrongdoing by the parties and was paid by the county. News coverage noted the settlement stemmed from claims that Steele pressured Calabrese to leak confidential information and retaliated after he cooperated with investigators.

Separately, in June 2025 the Cook County Board of Ethics issued a Notice of Determination finding that Steele violated §2-577 of the Cook County Ethics Ordinance by disclosing confidential information about the Bears’ Arlington Park appeals on three occasions in 2023–2024, imposing maximum civil penalties for each violation.

=== DUI arrest ===
In November 2024, Steele was arrested and charged with driving under the influence in Chicago. According to police reports, Steele allegedly made derogatory comments to the arresting officers, including repeatedly asking one officer, "Is your penis that small?" A subsequent WBEZ story reported a 911 caller said the driver tried to leave the scene of the crash; the caller also said the driver appeared intoxicated. The incident led to calls for her resignation from some political figures. The Chicago Sun-Times editorial board also called for her resignation.

Steele's driver's license was initially suspended but was reinstated in December 2024 following a court hearing. Despite a nurse, four policemen and a civilian witness testifying that Steele was intoxicated, in 2026 she was found not guilty.

=== Failure to disclose economic interests ===
In a July 2025 report, the Cook County Office of the Independent Inspector General (OIIG) found that Steele had failed to disclose her position with another state government, as well as contractual relationships her consulting firm had with several municipalities, on her Statements of Economic Interests for 2022, 2023, and 2024. The OIIG concluded that these omissions violated the Cook County Ethics Ordinance and constituted a breach of her fiduciary duty. The OIIG recommended that Steele file amended statements to correct the omissions.

=== Board of Ethics fines against Steele and her staff ===
At its June 25, 2025 meeting, the Cook County Board of Ethics approved multiple Notices of Determination concerning Steele's office.

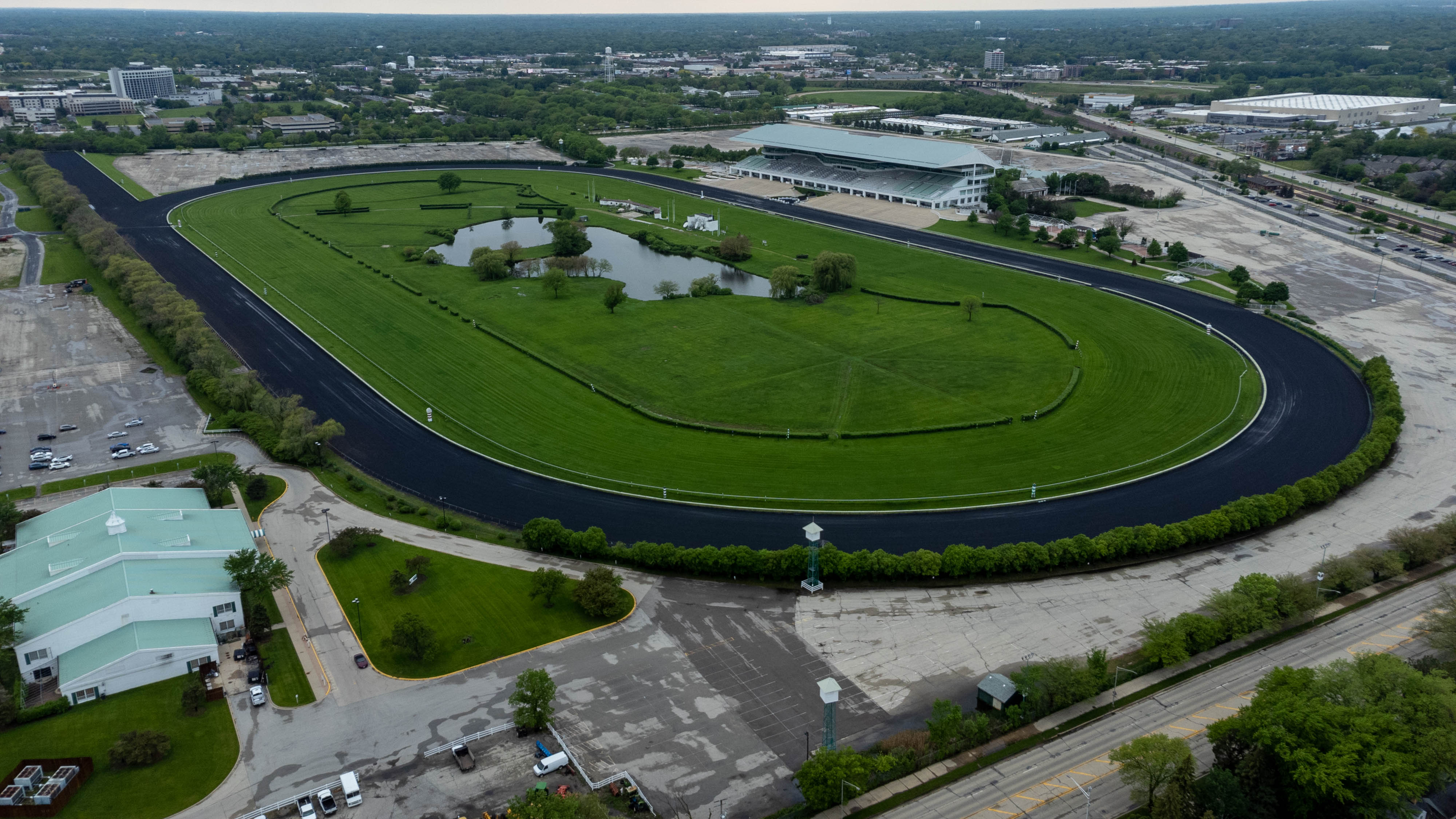
Arlington International Racecourse in Arlington Heights, the site of a Chicago Bears property-tax appeal reviewed by the Board of Review.

In Notice of Determination 25I001, the Board found that Steele violated §2-577 of the Cook County Ethics Ordinance by disclosing confidential information about the Chicago Bears’ Arlington Park tax appeals on three separate occasions in 2023 and 2024. The Notice identifies (1) statements attributed to Steele that relayed an intervenors’ appraisal figure while settlement talks were still pending in early May 2023; (2) a statement quoted on February 20, 2024, indicating there was a preliminary agreement on valuation; and (3) a February 21, 2024 television interview in which she discussed the Board of Review's decision-making process while the appeal remained pending. The Board stated it relied in part on the Cook County Office of the Independent Inspector General's Summary Report No. IIG24-0144 and on a March 13, 2025 interview with Steele, and it imposed the maximum civil penalty of $3,000 for each instance, payable within 30 days.

In a separate Notice of Determination, 23I001, the Board found that Steele's Director of Special Projects, Daniel C. Balanoff (formerly her First Assistant), violated §2-573 (dual employment) and §2-576 (misuse of County time). According to the Notice, Balanoff worked on three private real estate matters during County hours; attended Chicago Cubs games during the workday on August 4, 2023, and April 1, 2024 (using sick time for the latter); and traveled for personal reasons during work hours on September 13, 2023, and March 29, 2024, including joining a Board of Review meeting from an airplane, without taking leave. The Board ordered $1,000 in fines for dual employment plus $3,500 for four misuse-of-time incidents, and recorded his resignation effective June 5, 2025.

A third notice (Case No. 2024I001) detailed findings against Steele's executive director/scheduler, Ryan McIntyre, for misusing County time by attending a political conference in Washington, D.C., while on the County clock without charging leave. The Board of Ethics imposed fines on McIntyre for his conduct. The Board also fined Steele $1,000 and Balanoff $750 for permitting McIntyre to attend the political conference on County time and approving related County resources.

== Personal life ==
Steele lives in Evanston, Illinois with her family.

== Electoral history ==
=== Tippecanoe County, Indiana Assessor ===
2010 Tippecanoe County Assessor election
Party	Candidate	Votes	%
Republican	Linda Phillips	16,387	46.31
Democratic	Samantha Steele (incumbent)	12,151	34.34
Libertarian	Georgia Jones	6,846	19.35
Total votes		35,384	100

=== Cook County Board of Review ===
2022 Cook County Board of Review 2nd district Democratic primary
Party	Candidate	Votes	%
Democratic	Samantha Steele	90,293	52.42
Democratic	Michael Cabonargi (incumbent)	81,970	47.58
Total votes		172,263	100

2022 Cook County Board of Review 2nd district election
Party	Candidate	Votes	%
Democratic	Samantha Steele	413,835	100
Total votes		413,835	100

2026 Cook County Board of Review 2nd district Democratic primary
Party	Candidate	Votes	%
Democratic	Elizabeth Nicholson	141,362	62.3
Democratic	Samantha Steele (incumbent)	85,444	37.7
Total votes		226,806	100
