= Michael Cabonargi =

American politician & lawyer (born 1971)

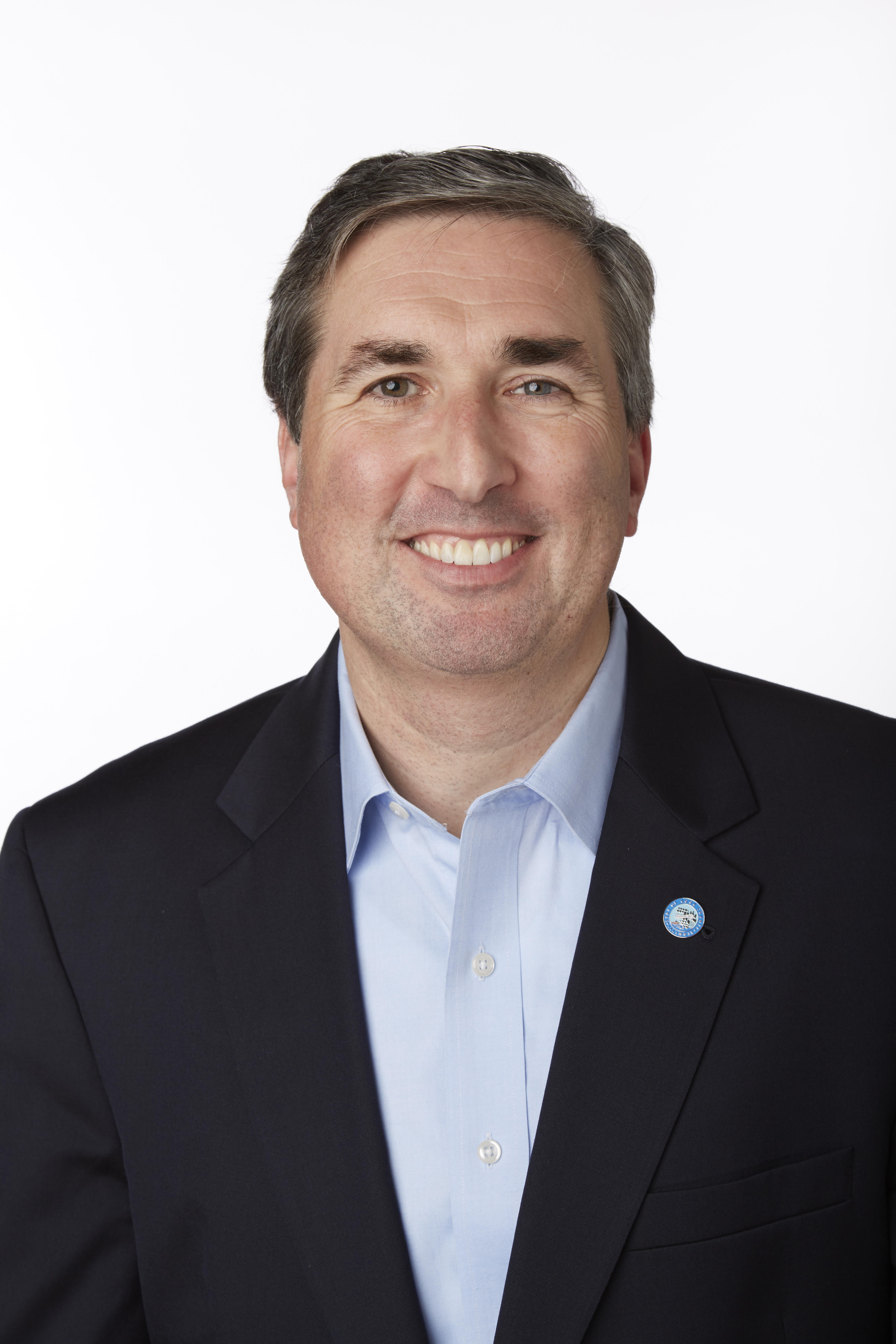
- Carbonargi, in 2019

Judge on the Circuit Court of Cook County
- Incumbent
- Assumed office June 13, 2025
- Appointed by: Supreme Court of Illinois
- Preceded by: Mary Ellen Coglan
- Constituency: at-large

Region 5 Director of the U.S. Department of Health and Human Services
- In office March 13, 2023 – 2025
- President: Joe Biden
- Preceded by: Janine Boyd
- Succeeded by: vacant

Commissioner of Cook County Board of Review from the 2nd district
- In office February 10, 2011 – December 5, 2022
- Preceded by: Joseph Berrios
- Succeeded by: Samantha Steele

Personal details
- Born: January 29, 1971 (age 55)
- Party: Democratic
- Education: Miami University (B.A.); University of Illinois College of Law (J.D.)

Michael M. Cabonargi (born January 29, 1971) is an American politician and attorney who has served as a judge on the Circuit Court of Cook County since 2025. He formerly held the offices of commissioner of the Cook County Board of Review from the 2nd district (2011–2022), vice-chair of the Democratic Party of Illinois (2019–2023), and Region 5 of the Department of Health and Human Services (2023–2025).

In his early career, Cabonargi worked on the staffs of Illinois U.S. senators Paul Simon and Dick Durbin. He then worked as a law clerk to U.S. District Court judge William J. Hibbler. Thereafter, he entered the private sector, working as a lawyer concentrating in complex commercial and regulatory litigation.

From 2005, until being appointed to serve on the Cook County Board of Review in 2011, Cabonargi worked as senior attorney and prosecutor at the U.S. Securities and Exchange Commission.

Cabonargi also held leadership roles within the Democratic Party of Illinois, and served as a 2020 presidential elector. In 2020, he unsuccessfully ran in the Democratic primary for clerk of the Cook County Circuit Court.

== Early life and career ==
Cabonargi was born January 29, 1971.

Cabonargi graduated from Loyola Academy high school in 1989.

In 1993, Cabonargi graduated from Miami University with Bachelor of Arts in both political science and foreign affairs.

From 1993 to 1997, Cabonargi worked as a staff assistant and economic development advisor in the Chicago office of U.S. senator Paul Simon. In 1997, Cabonargi worked as a staff assistant in the Chicago office of U.S. senator Dick Durbin.

In 2000, Cabonorgi received his Juris Doctor from the University of Illinois College of Law with honors.

From 2000 to 2002, Cabonargi worked as a law clerk to U.S. District Court judge William J. Hibbler. During his time in this position, he initiated and helped to establish the courts first help desk for pro se litigants. For this, he was given the Award for Excellence in Public Interest Service from the Federal Bar Association and the U.S. District Court.

From 2002 to 2004, Cabonargi worked as a lawyer at the law firm of Gardner Carton and Douglas LLP, where he concentrated on complex commercial litigation. During his time at this firm, he defended the City of Chicago in both federal and state litigation related to the closure of Meigs Field. From 2004 to 2005, he worked at the law firm of Bell, Boyd, and Lloyd, LLC, where he concentrated on complex commercial and regulatory litigation. While working here, he was also appointed Special Assistant Cook County State's Attorney, defending the Cook County Sheriff's Department against claims of police misconduct.

From 2003 to 2005, he served on the Illinois Comptroller's Ethics Commission.

== U.S. Securities and Exchange Commission ==
From 2005 until 2011, Cabonargi worked as a senior attorney and prosecutor in the Division of Enforcement at the Chicago Regional Office of the U.S. Securities and Exchange Commission. He brought a $2.8 billion private offering fraud case, at the time the largest private offering fraud case filed by the Commission. For this he was bestowed the Chairman's Award. In 2008, for his work against financial fraud targeting seniors, he was bestowed the SEC Director's Award for Excellence.

== Cook County Board of Review ==
Cabonargi was appointed by Chief Justice of the Circuit Court of Cook County Timothy C. Evans to serve as commissioner of Cook County Board of Review from the 2nd district, after the position was vacated by Joseph Berrios, who had been elected Cook County Assessor. Cabonargi had been selected over several other people who had also expressed interest in the position, including Joseph Mario Moreno and Eugene Schulter. Evans had picked Cabonargi from among 11 candidates. Cabonargi was sworn in on February 10, 2011.

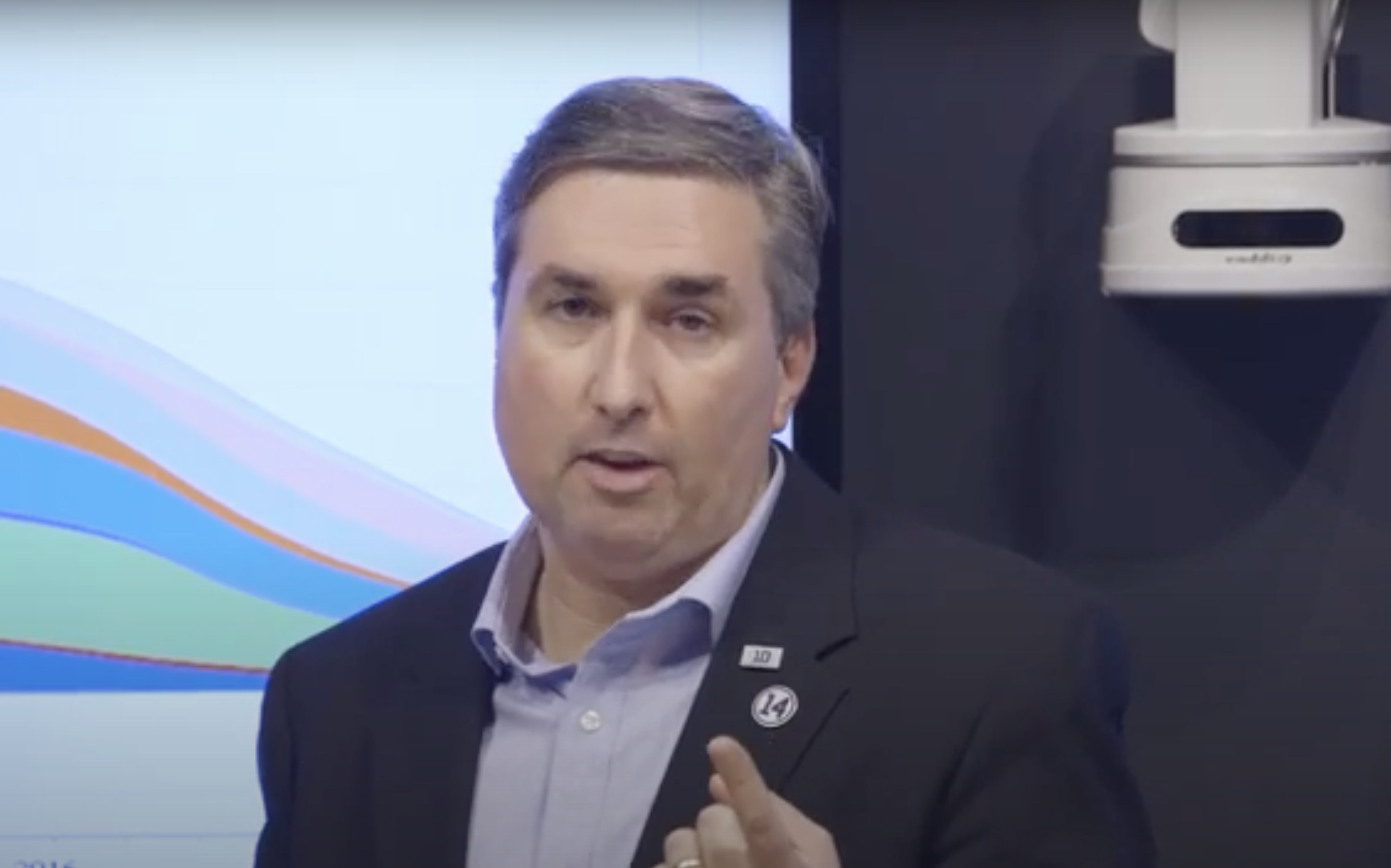
Cabonargi giving a speech in 2016

Cabonargi was reelected, unopposed, in 2012, 2016, and 2018.

In March 2018, Cabonargi's campaign was asked by the Board of Ethics to return $68,950 in funds received from 97 contributions that were in excess of limits. Cabonargi complied with the Board of Ethics ruling and returned the $68,950 in donations and cited the multiple changes in county reporting measures.

In 2020, Cabonargi voiced disagreement with a notion expressed by former Cook County clerk David Orr that the Cook County Board of Review has a "longtime pay-to-play culture" and needed reform. Cabonargi said "the Board of Review has ethics protocols in place to ensure transparency and professionalism..."

In 2022, Cabonargi lost his bid for reelection to the Cook County Board of Review. His loss to political newcomer Samantha Steele was considered an upset to the incumbent Cabonargi. His tenure on the Board of Review ended on December 5, 2022.

=== 2020 Clerk of the Circuit Court of Cook County campaign ===
In 2020, Cabonargi ran to replace outgoing Clerk of the Circuit Court of Cook County Dorothy A. Brown.

Cabonargi received the endorsement of the Cook County Democratic Party. He also was endorsed by the Chicago Federation of Labor and Chicago Sun-Times. He additionally received endorsements from Dick Durbin, Toni Preckwinkle, and Jesse White.

Cabonargi pledged, if elected, to modernize the office.

Meiseter filed an ethics complaint against Cabonargi in mid-January 2020 alleging that Cabonargi had accepted $120,000 in improper campaign donations from individuals who had argued property tax appeals before him at the Cook County Board of Review. Cabonargi's campaign claimed the allegations in the ethics complaint were false.

Cabonargi placed second, losing to Iris Martinez.

== Democratic Party leadership roles (2018–2023) ==
In 2018, Cabonargi was elected as the Illinois Democratic state central committeeman for Illinois's 9th congressional district. Per the Chicago Tribune's Rick Pearson, as of 2021, Cabonargi was one of the more politically progressive members of the Illinois Democratic State Central Committee.

In 2019, Cabonargi was appointed a vice-chair of the Democratic Party of Illinois. In 2021, Cabonargi supported Robin Kelly in her successful bid to become the chair of the Democratic Party of Illinois.

Cabornargi was a delegate to both the 2012 and 2016 Democratic National Conventions.

Ahead of the 2020 United States presidential election, Cabonargi, with Chicago government affairs consultant Mike Alexander, organized for more than 120 lawyers and other legal professions to travel to the swing state of Michigan, with the goal of helping to assist in enabling a potential victory for the Democratic presidential ticket of Joe Biden and Kamala Harris in the state's vote.

On January 27, 2023, Cabornargi departed his role as a state central committeeman in the Illinois' Democratic State Central Committee in order to accept the position of regional director for the U.S. Department of Health and Human Services.

== Regional Director of the Department of Health and Human Services (2023–2025) ==
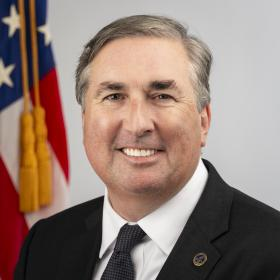
official portrait, 2023

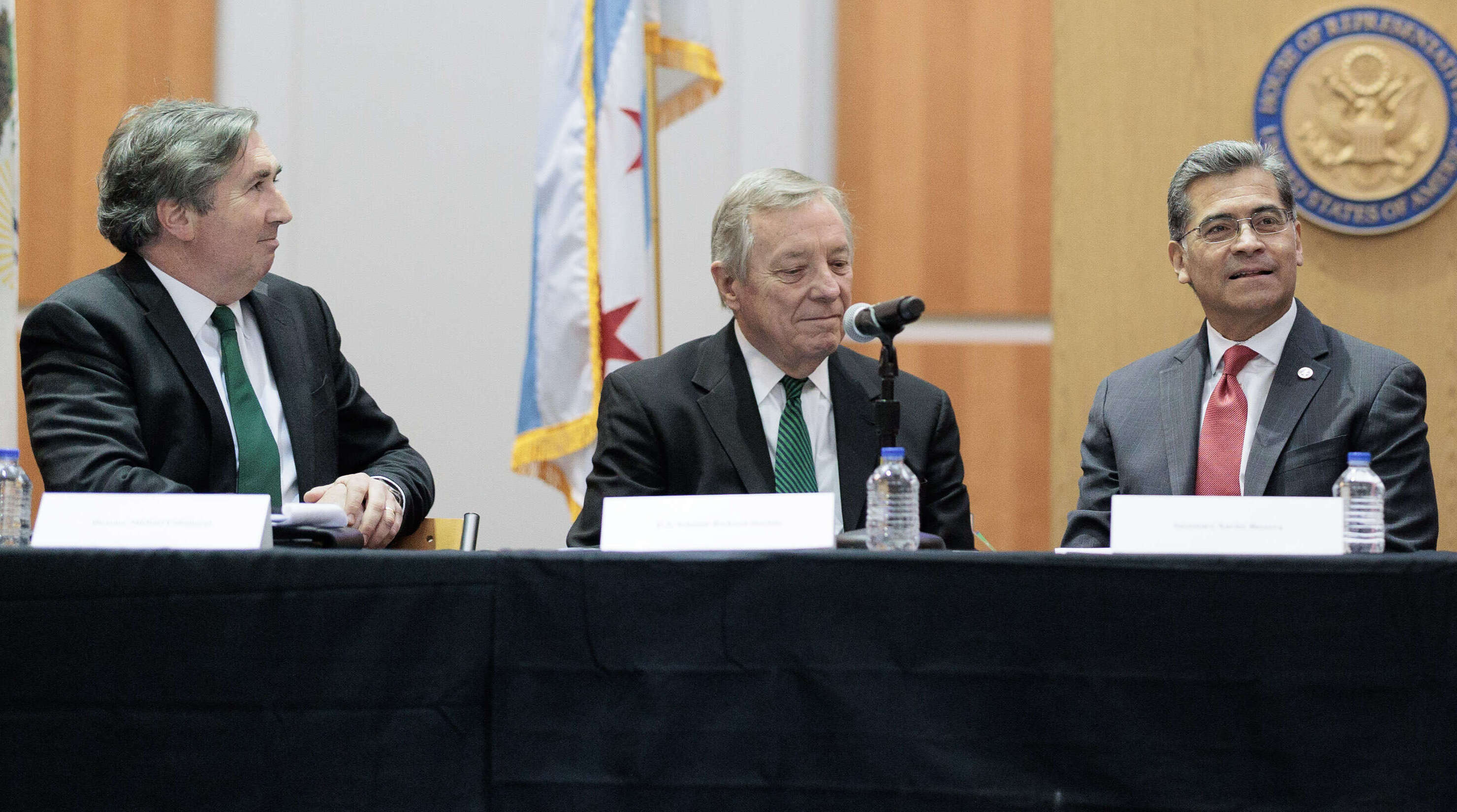
Cabonargi (left) in 2023 with Senator Dick Durbin (center) and HHS Secretary Xavier Becerra

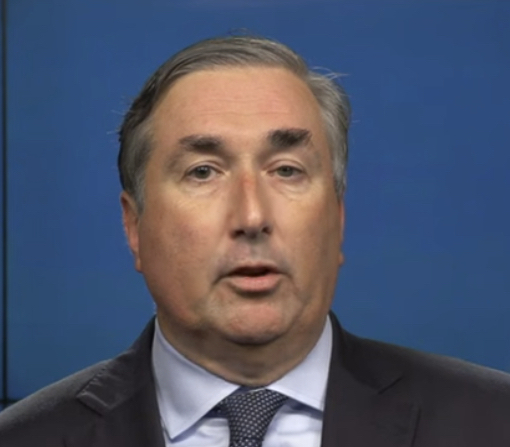
Cabornargi in 2023

In early 2023, Cabornargi sent an email to colleagues within the Democratic Party to inform them that he would be departing his role in Illinois' State Democratic Central Committee in order to accept an appointment by President Joe Biden to serve as a regional director for the Department of Health and Human Services. He was formally appointed to this role on March 13, 2023.

== County judge (2025–present) ==
In June 2025, Justice Joy V. Cunningham announced that the Illinois Supreme Court would appoint Cabornargi as an at-large judge of the Circuit Court of Cook County effective June 13. His appointment to the court filled a vacancy created by the retirement of Judge Ellen Coglan. Cabornargi's appointed term will expire December 7, 2026. Cabonargi was assigned to hear traffic court cases.

Cabonargi ran for a full term in 2026, being challenged in the Democratic primary by attorney Ashonta C. Rice. Cabonargi was included on the slate of candidates endorsed by the Cook County Democratic Party. In February, the organization Injustice Watch published a profile which flagged ethics concerns about campaign donations Cabonargi and his fellow Board of Review commissioners had accepted in 2017 and 2018 from real estate professionals with business before the board. Cabonargi was ultimately defeated by Rice in the primary.

== Other work ==
Cabonargi served on the local school council of the Brentano Elementary School from 2006 to 2008. From 2007 to 2009, he served on the 35th Ward's Zoning Advisory Committee. Cabonargi also formerly served as a member of the University of Illinois College of Law Alumni Board.

After the 2018 Illinois gubernatorial election, Cabonargi was a member of J. B. Pritzker's Governor Elect's Budget and Innovation Transition Committee.

In 2012, Cabonargi was selected to be a fellow with Leadership Greater Chicago.

Cabonargi serves as a board member of the Loyola Academy Bar Association, District 39 Educational Foundation, Joint Civic Committee of Italian Americans, and Milan Committee of Chicago’s Sister Cities Program.

Cabonargi served as a 2020 Democratic United States Electoral College elector from Illinois, casting his votes for Joe Biden as president and Kamala Harris as vice-president.

Between January and June 2025, Cabonargi served as the Democratic Party counsel to U.S. Senate Judiciary Committee. In this role, he researched the backgrounds of various nominees put forward by Donald Trump for his second presidency ahead of their Senate conformation hearings, including Kash Patel his nomination for FBI director was still pending.

== Personal life ==
Cabonargi is married to Erin Lavin Cabonargi and has two sons. His wife previously served as head of Chicago's Public Building Commission. She more recently served as director of construction at Sterling Bay, before leaving in 2018 to start Hibernian Advisors and Hibernian Real Estate Development, a consulting firm and a development firm.

As of 2011, Cabonargi lived in the Logan Square neighborhood of Chicago. As of 2020, he lived in the Chicago suburb of Wilmette.

== Electoral history ==
=== Cook County Board of Review ===
2012

2012 Cook County Board of Review 2nd district Democratic primary
Party	Candidate	Votes	%
Democratic	Michael Cabonargi (incumbent)	88,990	100
Total votes		88,990	100

2012 Cook County Board of Review 2nd district election
Party	Candidate	Votes	%
Democratic	Michael Cabonargi (incumbent)	404,100	100
Total votes		404,100	100

2016

2016 Cook County Board of Review 2nd district Democratic primary
Party	Candidate	Votes	%
Democratic	Michael Cabonargi (incumbent)	275,406	100
Total votes		275,406	100

2016 Cook County Board of Review 2nd district election
Party	Candidate	Votes	%
Democratic	Michael Cabonargi (incumbent)	508,321	100
Total votes		508,321	100

2018

2018 Cook County Board of Review 2nd district Democratic primary
Party	Candidate	Votes	%
Democratic	Michael Cabonargi (incumbent)	228,367	100
Total votes		228,367	100

2018 Cook County Board of Review 2nd district election
Party	Candidate	Votes	%
Democratic	Michael Cabonargi (incumbent)	468,818	100
Total votes		468,818	100

2022

2022 Cook County Board of Review 2nd district Democratic primary
Party	Candidate	Votes	%
Democratic	Samantha Steele	90,293	52.42
Democratic	Michael Cabonargi (incumbent)	81,970	47.58
Total votes		172,263	100

=== Illinois Democratic State Central Committeeman for the ninth congressional district ===
2018 Illinois Democratic State Central Committeeman for the ninth congressional district election
Party	Candidate	Votes	%
Democratic	Michael Cabonargi	94,423	100
Total votes		94,423	100

=== Clerk of the Circuit Court of Cook County ===
2020 Clerk of the Circuit Court of Cook County Democratic primary
Party	Candidate	Votes	%
Democratic	Iris Y. Martinez	269,578	33.67
Democratic	Michael M. Cabonargi	216,180	27.00
Democratic	Richard R. Boykin	199,526	24.92
Democratic	Jacob Meister	113,855	14.22
Write-in	Others	1,511	0.19
Total votes		800,650	100
