= 2024 Cook County, Illinois, elections =

- November 5, 2024

The Cook County, Illinois, general election were held on November 5, 2024. Elections were held for Clerk of the Circuit Court, State's Attorney, Board of Commissioners district 1, Cook County Board of Review district 1, four seats on the Water Reclamation District Board, and judgeships on the Circuit Court of Cook County.

Primary elections, held using the open primary system, took place on March 19, 2024.

== Clerk of the Circuit Court ==
2024 Clerk of the Circuit Court of Cook County election
- November 5, 2024
Candidate	Mariyana Spyropoulos	Lupe Aguirre	Michael Murphy
Party	Democratic	Republican	Libertarian
Popular vote	1,322,315	498,205	124,368
Percentage	67.99%	25.62%	6.39%
Clerk before election
Iris Martinez
Democratic
Elected Clerk
Mariyana T. Spyropoulos
Democratic

The incumbent first-term clerk of the Circuit Court of Cook County, Iris Martinez, ran for re-election, but was defeated for re-nomination by Mariyana T. Spyropoulos. In the Republican and Libertarian party primaries, one candidate each ran uncontested. Spyropoulos won the general election with 68% of the vote.

=== Democratic party primary ===
In the Democratic primary election, Martinez faced a challenge from Mariyana Spyropoulos, who had served as Metropolitan Water Reclamation District commissioner since 2016.

==== Candidates ====
Candidate	Experience	Campaign	Ref
Iris Martinez	Incumbent	Website	
Mariyana T. Spyropoulos	Metropolitan Water Reclamation District commissioner (2016-present)	Website	

Results

Clerk of the Circuit Court of Cook County Democratic primary
Party	Candidate	Votes	%
Democratic	Mariyana T. Spyropoulos	329,635	65.17
Democratic	Iris Y. Martinez (incumbent)	176,195	34.83
Total votes		505,830	100.0

=== Republican party primary ===
Lupe Aguirre ran uncontested in the Republican primary election.

=== Libertarian party primary ===
Michael Murphy ran uncontested in the Libertarian primary election.

=== General election ===
Results

Cook County Clerk of the Circuit Court election
Party	Candidate	Votes	%	±%
Democratic	Mariyana T. Spyropoulos	1,322,315	67.99	−5.04%
Republican	Lupe Aguirre	498,205	25.62	−1.35%
Libertarian	Michael Murphy	124,368	6.39	N/A
Total votes		1,944,888	100.0	
Democratic hold				

== State's Attorney ==
Incumbent second-term Cook County State's Attorney, Kim Foxx, retired at the end of her term on December 1, 2024. Two candidates were running in the Democratic primary election, and one candidate each is running uncontested in the Republican and Libertarian primary elections.

2024 Cook County State's Attorney election
- November 5, 2024
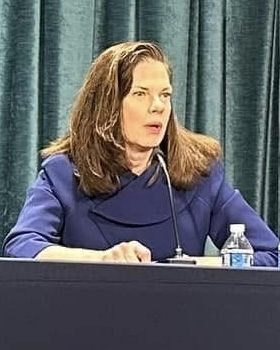

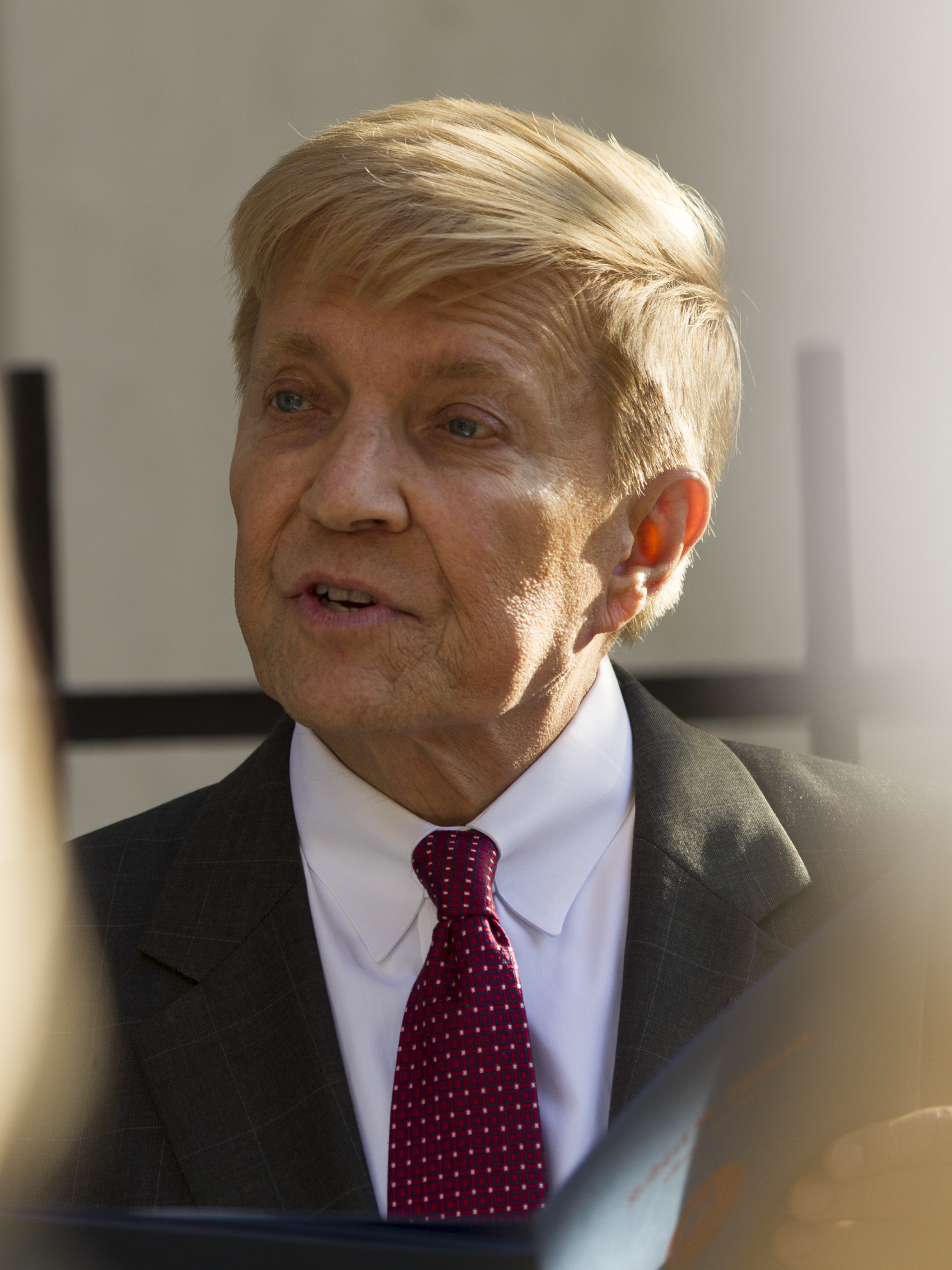
Candidate	Eileen O'Neill Burke	Bob Fioretti
Party	Democratic	Republican
Popular vote	1,315,970	551,617
Percentage	67.36%	28.23%
State's Attorney before election
Kim Foxx
Democratic
Elected State's Attorney
Eileen O'Neill Burke
Democratic

=== Democratic party primary ===
==== Candidates ====
Candidate	Experience	Campaign	Ref
Clayton Harris III	Lecturer in public policy at the University of Chicago; Former assistant state's attorney	Website	
Eileen O'Neill Burke	Former judge on the Illinois First District Appellate Court (2016-2023) and Cook County Circuit Court (2008-2016)	Website	

Results

Cook County State’s Attorney election Democratic primary
Party	Candidate	Votes	%
Democratic	Eileen O'Neill Burke	264,428	50.15
Democratic	Clayton Harris III	262,857	49.85
Total votes		527,285	100.0

=== Republican party primary ===
Bob Fioretti, former Chicago City Council member and perennial candidate, was running uncontested in the Republican primary election.

=== Libertarian party primary ===
Andrew Charles Kopinski is running uncontested in the Libertarian primary election.

=== General election ===
Results

Cook County State’s Attorney election
Party	Candidate	Votes	%	±%
Democratic	Eileen O'Neill Burke	1,315,970	67.36	+13.15%
Republican	Bob Fioretti	551,617	28.23	−10.85%
Libertarian	Andrew Charles Kopinski	86,154	4.41	−2.30%
Total votes		1,953,761	100.0	
Democratic hold				

== Clerk ==
2024 Cook County Clerk special election
- November 5, 2024
Nominee	Monica Gordon	Michelle Pennington
Party	Democratic	Republican
Popular vote	1,320,946	530,680
Percentage	68.30%	27.44%
Clerk before election
Cedric Giles
Democratic
Elected Clerk
Monica Gordon
Democratic

=== General election ===
2024 Cook County Clerk special election
Party	Candidate	Votes	%	±%
Democratic	Monica Gordon	1,320,946	68.30	−3.28
Republican	Michelle Pennington	530,680	27.44	+1.18
Libertarian	Joseph Schreiner	82,526	4.26	+2.10
Total votes		1,934,152	100.0	

== Board of Commissioners, 1st district (special election) ==
2024 Cook County Board of Commissioners 1st district special election
- November 5, 2024
Candidate	Tara Stamps	James Humay
Party	Democratic	Libertarian
Popular vote	94,353	10,828
Percentage	89.71%	10.29%
Commissioner before election
Tara Stamps
Democratic
Elected Commissioner
Tara Stamps
Democratic

In the 2022 election, Brandon Johnson was re-elected as commissioner for the 1st district on the Cook County Board of Commissioners. After his election as Mayor of Chicago in 2023, Tara Stamps was appointed to replace him. Stamps is running for re-election to a full term, and faces a challenger in the Democratic primary election.

=== Democratic party primary ===
==== Candidates ====
Candidate	Experience	Campaign	Ref
Tara Stamps	Incumbent	Website	
Zerlina Smith-Members	Political consultant and perennial candidate	Website	

==== Results ====
2024 Cook County Board of Commissioners 1st district special election Democratic primary
Party	Candidate	Votes	%
Democratic	Tara Stamps (incumbent)	28,000	84.04
Democratic	Zerlina Smith	5,001	15.2
Total votes		33,001	100

=== General election ===
2024 Cook County Board of Commissioners 1st district special election
Party	Candidate	Votes	%	±%
Democratic	Tara Stamps (incumbent)	94,353	89.71	−3.16
Libertarian	James Humay	10,828	10.29	+3.16
Total votes		105,181	100	

== Water Reclamation District Board ==
2024 Metropolitan Water Reclamation District of Greater Chicago election
- November 5, 2024

4 of 9 seats on the Metropolitan Water Reclamation District of Greater Chicago 5 seats needed for a majority
	First party	Second party	Third party
Party	Democratic	Republican	Green
Seats before	9	0	0
Seats after	9	0	0
Seat change	0	0	0
Popular vote	4,523,932	1,810,583	185,130
Percentage	69.39%	27.77%	2.84%
Swing	▼10.49%	▲16.22%	▼8.7%
Seats up	4	0	0
Races won	4	0	0

In the 2024 Metropolitan Water Reclamation District of Greater Chicago election, three six-year term seats were up for a regularly scheduled election and an additional seat was upon for election to a partial term in a special election.

=== Regular election ===
Three seats with six-year terms were up for election in the regular election, with voters able to vote for up to three candidates. In both the primaries and general election, the top-three finishers were the winners.

==== Democratic primary ====
===== Candidates =====
- Marcelino Garcia, incumbent commissioner
- Daniel Pogorzelski, incumbent commissioner
- Kari Steele, incumbent commissioner
- Sharon Waller

====== Withdrawn or disqualified ======
- Eddie Ngozi Nwosu

===== Results =====
2024 Metropolitan Water Reclamation District of Greater Chicago regular election Democratic primary
Party	Candidate	Votes	%
Democratic	Kari K. Steele (incumbent)	366,070	31.15
Democratic	Marcelino Garcia (incumbent)	320,883	27.30
Democratic	Sharon Waller	249,745	21.25
Democratic	Daniel "Pogo" Pogorzelski (incumbent)	238,575	20.30
Total votes		1,175,273	100

==== Republican primary ====
2024 Metropolitan Water Reclamation District of Greater Chicago regular election Republican primary
Party	Candidate	Votes	%
Republican	Claire Connelly	65,116	35.6
Republican	Richard Dale	62,073	34.0
Republican	Brendan Ehlers	55,497	30.4
write-in	George Blakemore	32	0.0
Total votes		182,718	100

==== General election ====
2024 Metropolitan Water Reclamation District of Greater Chicago regular election
Party	Candidate	Votes	%
Democratic	Kari K. Steele (incumbent)	1,147,395	24.58
Democratic	Marcelino Garcia (incumbent)	1,053,366	22.57
Democratic	Sharon Waller	1,038,968	22.26
Republican	Claire Connelly	450,926	9.66
Republican	Richard F. Dale	424,890	9.10
Republican	Brendan Ehlers	366,856	7.86
Green	Toneal M. Jackson	185,130	3.97
Total votes		4,667,531	100

=== Special election ===
A special election was held for the remaining two years in an unexpired term.

==== Democratic primary ====
===== Candidates =====
- Precious Brady-Davis, incumbent commissioner

===== Results =====
2024 Metropolitan Water Reclamation District of Greater Chicago special election Democratic primary
Party	Candidate	Votes	%
Democratic	Precious Brady-Davis (incumbent)	425,160	100
Total votes		425,160	100

==== Republican primary ====
===== Candidates =====
- R. Cary Capparelli, former member of the Illinois International Port District Board (2000–2009); owner of a management and marketing firm; geography teacher at South Dakota State University; perennial candidate (including for past MWRD commissioner elections and for U.S. senate in 2026

===== Results =====
2024 Metropolitan Water Reclamation District of Greater Chicago special election Republican primary
Party	Candidate	Votes	%
Republican	R. Cary Capparelli	76,809	100
Total votes		76,809	100

==== General election ====
2024 Metropolitan Water Reclamation District of Greater Chicago special election
Party	Candidate	Votes	%
Democratic	Precious Brady-Davis (incumbent)	1,284,203	69.34
Republican	R. Cary Capparelli	567,911	30.66
Total votes		1,862,114	100
