= Cook County Board of Commissioners 5th district =

- District
- District 5th
- Current Board of Commissioners map, 5th district highlighted in red
- Country: United States
- State: Illinois
- County: Cook
- Townships and equivalent jurisdictions: List: Chicago; Bloom Township; Bremen Township; Calumet Township; Lake Township; Rich Township; Thornton Township; Worth Township

Government
  - Type: District
  - Body: Cook County Board of Commissioners
  - Commissioner: Kisha McCaskill (D)

Cook County Board of Commissioners 5th district is a single-member electoral district for the Cook County Board of Commissioners. It is currently represented by Kisha McCaskill, a Democrat.

== History ==
The district was established in 1994, when the board transitioned from holding elections in individual districts, as opposed to the previous practice of having two multi-member districts: one for ten members from the city of Chicago and another for seven members from suburban Cook County.

== Geography ==
In every incarnation since its inception, the district has covered portions of the South Side of Chicago and portions of its southern suburbs.

=== 1994 boundaries ===
When the district was first established, the district represented parts of the South Side and Southwest Side of Chicago, as well as parts of the southern suburbs of Cook County.

=== 2001 redistricting ===
New boundaries were adopted in August 2001, with redistricting taking place following the 2000 United States census.

In regards to townships and equivalent jurisdictions, the district's redistricted boundaries included portions of the city of Chicago and portions of the Bloom, Bremen, Calumet, Rich, Thornton, and Worth townships.

=== 2012 redistricting ===
The district, as redistricted in 2012 following the 2010 United States census, strongly resembled the geography it took in its previous, 2001, redistricting.

The district included parts of Alsip, Blue Island, Calumet Park, Chicago, Chicago Heights, Country Club Hills, Dixmoor, Dolton, East Hazel Crest, Flossmoor, Ford Heights, Glenwood, Harvey, Hazel Crest, Homewood, Lynwood, Marhkam, Merrionette Park, Midlothian, Oak Forest, Olympia Fields, Park Forest, Phoenix, Posen, Riverdale, Robbins, and Sauk Village.

In regards to townships and equivalent jurisdictions, it included portions of the city of Chicago and portions of Bloom, Bremen, Calumet, Rich, Thornton, and Worth townships.

The district was 76.68 square miles (49,076.30 acres).

=== 2022 redistricting ===
The district was redistricted in 2022 following the 2020 United States census. The district remained a majority Black district spanning across parts of the South Side of Chicago and parts of the city's southern suburbs. The district, as redistricted, includes portions of the city of Chicago and portions of the Chicago, Bloom, Bremen, Calumet, Lake, Rich, Thornton, and Worth Townships.

== Politics ==
The district was represented from its inception in 1994 through 2022 by Democratic commissioner Deborah Sims. She was succeeded in December 2022 by Democrat Monica Gordon.

== List of commissioners representing the district ==
Commissioner	Party	Years	Electoral history
Deborah Sims	Democratic	December 1994–December 5, 2022	Elected in 1994, 1998, 2002, 2006, 2010, 2014, 2018
Monica Gordon	Democratic	December 5, 2022–December 2024	Elected in 2022; resigned in order to take office as Cook County clerk
Kisha McCaskill	Democratic	January 2025	Appointed in 2025

== Election results ==
Cook County Board of Commissioners 5th district general elections
Year	Winning candidate	Party	Vote (pct)	Opponent	Party	Vote (pct)	Opponent	Party	Vote (pct)
1994	Deborah Sims	Democratic		Lawrence Ragland	Republican		Elliott Fourte	Harold Washington Party	
1998	Deborah Sims	Democratic	75,008 (100%)						
2002	Deborah Sims	Democratic	76,702 (100%)						
2006	Deborah Sims	Democratic	74,988 (100%)						
2010	Deborah Sims	Democratic	79,566 (90.38%)	Miriam Shabo	Republican	8,471 (9.62%)			
2014	Deborah Sims	Democratic	70,542 (100%)						
2018	Deborah Sims	Democratic	81,711 (100%)						
2022	Monica M. Gordon	Democratic	163,385 (91.35%)	Jason Decker	Libertarian	6,005 (8.65%)			
