= 2026 Cook County, Illinois, elections =

- November 3, 2026

The Cook County, Illinois general elections were held on November 3, 2026. Primaries were held on March 17, 2026.

Elections were held for assessor, clerk, sheriff, treasurer, president of the Cook County Board of Commissioners, all 17 seats of the Cook County Board of Commissioners, two seats of the Cook County Board of Review, four seats on the Water Reclamation District Board, and judgeships on the Circuit Court of Cook County.

== Assessor ==
2026 Cook County Assessor election
- November 3, 2026
Nominee	Pat Hynes	Nico Tsatsoulis
Party	Democratic	Libertarian
Popular vote	1,235,371	196,522
Percentage	86.28%	13.72%
Assessor before election
Fritz Kaegi
Democratic
Elected Assessor
Pat Hynes
Democratic

Second-term incumbent Fritz Kaegi, a Democrat, was defeated in his party's primary by Pat Hynes. Hynes won the general election.

=== Democratic primary ===
==== Candidates ====
===== Nominee =====
- Pat Hynes, Lyons Township assessor and nephew of former Cook County assessor Thomas Hynes

===== Eliminated in primary =====
- Fritz Kaegi, incumbent assessor

===== Withdrawn =====
- Samantha Steele, Cook County Board of Review member from the 2nd district (2022–present) (unsuccessfully ran for re-election)

==== Endorsements ====
Pat Hynes

U.S. representatives

- Bobby Rush, former IL-01 (1993–2023)

Statewide officials

- Kwame Raoul, Illinois Attorney General (2019–present)
- Jesse White, former Illinois Secretary of State (1999–2023)

State legislators

- Napoleon Harris, state senator from the 15th district (2013–present) and supervisor of Thornton Township (2025–present)
- Chris Welch, Speaker of the Illinois House of Representatives (2021–present) from the 7th district (2013–present)

Local officials

- Red Burnett, Chicago alder from the 27th ward (2025–present)
- Stephanie Coleman, Chicago alder from the 16th ward (2019–present)
- Jason Ervin, Chicago alder from the 28th ward (2011–present)
- Monica Gordon, Cook County Clerk (2024–present)
- David Moore, Chicago alder from the 17th ward (2015–present)
- Anna Valencia, Chicago City Clerk (2017–present)
- 3 Chicago School Board members

Labor unions

- Chicago Federation of Labor
- Chicago Fire Fighters Union Local 2
- International Union of Bricklayers and Allied Craftworkers District Council 1
- International Union of Operating Engineers Locals 150 and 399
- Plumbers Local 130
- SEIU Healthcare
- SEIU Illinois State Council
- Teamsters Joint Council 25

Organizations

- Cook County Democratic Party
Fritz Kaegi

U.S. senators

- Tammy Duckworth, Illinois (2017–present)
- Dick Durbin, Illinois (1997–present)

U.S. representatives

- Danny Davis, IL-07 (1997–present)
- Bill Foster, IL-11 (2008–2011, 2013–present)
- Chuy García, IL-04 (2019–present)
- Jonathan Jackson, IL-01 (2023–present)
- Robin Kelly, IL-02 (2013–present)
- Delia Ramirez, IL-03 (2023–present)
- Jan Schakowsky, IL-09 (1993–present)
- Brad Schneider, IL-10 (2013–2015, 2017–present)

State legislators

- Mary Beth Canty, state representative from the 54th district (2023–present)
- Kelly Cassidy, state representative from the 14th district (2011–present)
- Javier Cervantes, state senator from the 1st district (2022–present)
- Fred Crespo, state representative from the 44th district (2007–present)
- Will Davis, state representative from the 30th district (2003–present)
- Robyn Gabel, Majority Leader of the Illinois House of Representatives (2023–present) from the 18th district (2010–present)
- Edgar Gonzalez Jr., state representative from the 23rd district (2020–present)
- Nicolle Grasse, state representative from the 53rd district (2024–present)
- Graciela Guzmán, state senator from the 20th district (2024–present)
- Will Guzzardi, state representative from the 39th district (2015–present)
- Norma Hernandez, state representative from the 77th district (2023–present)
- Lindsey LaPointe, state representative from the 19th district (2019–present)
- Theresa Mah, state representative from the 24th district (2017–present)
- Tracy Katz Muhl, state representative from the 57th district (2024–present)
- Michelle Mussman, state representative from the 56th district (2011–present)
- Aaron Ortiz, state representative from the 1st district (2019–present)
- Abdelnasser Rashid, state representative from the 21st district (2023–present)
- Nabeela Syed, state representative from the 51st district (2023–present)
- Mark Walker, state senator from the 27th district (2024–present)

Local officials

- Anthony Beale, Chicago alder from the 9th ward (1999–present)
- Pat Dowell, Chicago alder from the 3rd ward (2007–present)
- Jeylú Gutiérrez, Chicago alder from the 14th ward (2023–present)
- Maria Hadden, Chicago alder from the 49th ward (2019–present)
- Timmy Knudsen, Chicago alder from the 43rd ward (2022–present)
- Daniel La Spata, Chicago alder from the 1st ward (2019–present)
- Leni Manaa-Hoppenworth, Chicago alder from the 48th ward (2023–present)
- Anthony Quezada, Chicago alder from the 35th ward (2025–present)
- Julia Ramirez, Chicago alder from the 12th ward (2023–present)
- Michael Rodriguez, Chicago alder from the 22nd ward (2019–present)
- Michele Smith, former Chicago alder from the 43rd ward (2011–2022)
- Chris Taliaferro, Chicago alder from the 29th ward (2015–present)
- Maggie Trevor, Cook County commissioner from the 9th district (2022–present)
- Andre Vasquez, Chicago alder from the 40th ward (2019–present)
- Scott Waguespack, Chicago alder from the 32nd ward (2007–present)

Labor unions

- American Federation of State, County and Municipal Employees Council 31
- Cook County College Teachers Union Local 1600

Organizations

- Citizen Action Illinois
- Equality Illinois

Newspapers

- The Chicago Crusader
- Chicago Tribune
- Daily Herald
Declined to endorse

Organizations

- New Trier Democrats

==== Polling ====
Poll source	Date(s) administered	Sample size (Note: Key: A – all adults RV – registered voters LV – likely voters V – unclear)	Margin of error	Fritz Kaegi	Pat Hynes	Other	Undecided
Impact Research (D) (Note: This poll was sponsored by Hynes's campaign)	October 31 – November 5, 2025	600 (LV)	± 4.0%	31%	24%	–	45%
Change Research (Note: This poll was sponsored by Kaegi's campaign)	June 24 – July 2, 2025	1,052 (LV)	± 3.1%	19%	6%	15% (Note: "Would not vote" with 6%; Steele with 5%; Pointer and Burruss with 2%)	60%

==== Results ====
2026 Cook County Assessor Democratic primary
Party	Candidate	Votes	%
Democratic	Pat Hynes	341,841	51.95
Democratic	Fritz Kaegi (incumbent)	316,177	48.05
Total votes		658,018	100

=== Republican primary ===
No candidate ran in the Republican primary.

=== Libertarian primary ===
Nico Tsatsoulis was the only candidate in the Libertarian primary. He also ran as the party's nominee in 2022. He had received over 200,000 votes in the 2022 general election.

2026 Cook County Assessor Libertarian primary
Party	Candidate	Votes	%
Libertarian	Nico Tsatsoulis	2,391	100
Total votes		2,391	100

=== General election ===
2026 Cook County Assessor election
Party	Candidate	Votes	%
Democratic	Pat Hynes	1,235,371	86.28
Libertarian	Nico Tsatsoulis	196,522	13.72
Total votes		1,431,893	100

== Clerk ==
2026 Cook County Clerk election
- November 3, 2026
Nominee	Monica Gordon
Party	Democratic
Popular vote	1,284,987
Percentage	100%
Clerk before election
Monica Gordon
Democratic
Elected Clerk
Monica Gordon
Democratic

Incumbent clerk Monica Gordon won re-election, running unopposed.

=== Democratic primary ===
==== Candidates ====
- Monica Gordon, incumbent clerk

==== Endorsements ====
Monica Gordon

Labor unions

- Chicago Federation of Labor
- Chicago Teachers Union
- International Union of Operating Engineers Locals 150 and 399
- Plumbers Local 130
- SEIU Illinois State Council

Organizations

- Cook County Democratic Party
- Equality Illinois
- New Trier Democrats

Newspapers

- The Chicago Crusader

==== Results ====
2026 Cook County Clerk Democratic primary
Party	Candidate	Votes	%
Democratic	Monica Gordon (incumbent)	602,809	100
Total votes		602,809	100

=== Republican primary ===
No candidate ran in the Republican primary.

=== Libertarian primary ===
Hontas Farmer ran as a write-in in the Libertarian Party primary.

2026 Cook County Clerk Libertarian primary
Party	Candidate	Votes	%
write-in	Hontas Farmer	40	100
Total votes		40	100

=== General election ===
2026 Cook County Clerk election
Party	Candidate	Votes	%
Democratic	Monica Gordon	1,284,987	100
Total votes		1,284,987	100

== Sheriff ==
2026 Cook County Sheriff election
- November 3, 2026
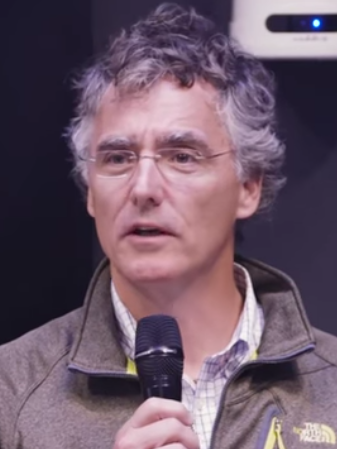

Nominee	Tom Dart	Brad Sandefur
Party	Democratic	Libertarian
Popular vote	1,219,028	193,856
Percentage	86.28%	13.72%
Sheriff before election
Tom Dart
Democratic
Elected Sheriff
Tom Dart
Democratic

Incumbent sheriff Tom Dart was re-elected to a sixth term.

=== Democratic primary ===
==== Candidates ====
- Tom Dart, incumbent sheriff

==== Endorsements ====
Tom Dart

Labor unions

- International Union of Operating Engineers Local 150

Organizations

- Cook County Democratic Party
- New Trier Democrats

Newspapers

- The Chicago Crusader

==== Results ====
2026 Cook County Sheriff Democratic primary
Party	Candidate	Votes	%
Democratic	Thomas J. Dart (incumbent)	612,500	100
Total votes		612,500	100

=== Republican primary ===
No candidate ran in the Republican primary.

=== Libertarian primary ===
Brad Sandefur, who ran as the Libertarian nominee for Sheriff in 2022, was the only candidate in the primary, therefore advancing to the general election.

2026 Cook County Sheriff Libertarian primary
Party	Candidate	Votes	%
Libertarian	Brad Sandefur	2,422	100
Total votes		2,422	100

=== General election ===
2026 Cook County Sheriff election
Party	Candidate	Votes	%
Democratic	Thomas J. Dart (incumbent)	1,219,028	86.28
Libertarian	Brad Sandefur	193,856	13.72
Total votes		1,412,884	100

== Treasurer ==
2026 Cook County Treasurer election
- November 3, 2026
Candidate	Maria Pappas
Party	Democratic
Popular vote	1,319,497
Percentage	100%
Treasurer before election
Maria Pappas
Democratic
Elected Treasurer
Maria Pappas
Democratic

Incumbent treasurer Maria Pappas, a Democrat, was reelected to an eighth term.

=== Democratic primary ===
==== Candidates ====
- Maria Pappas, incumbent treasurer

==== Endorsements ====
Maria Pappas

Labor unions

- Chicago Federation of Labor
- International Union of Operating Engineers Locals 150 and 399
- Plumbers Local 130

Organizations

- Cook County Democratic Party
- New Trier Democrats

Newspapers

- The Chicago Crusader

==== Results ====
2026 Cook County Treasurer Democratic primary
Party	Candidate	Votes	%
Democratic	Maria Pappas (incumbent)	624,514	100
Total votes		624,514	100

=== Republican and Libertarian primaries ===
No candidates ran in either the Republican or Libertarian primaries.

=== General election ===
2026 President of the Cook County Treasurer election
Party	Candidate	Votes	%
Democratic	Maria Pappas (incumbent)	1,319,497	100
Total votes		1,319,497	100

== President of the Cook County Board of Commissioners ==
2026 President of the Cook County Board of Commissioners election
- November 3, 2026
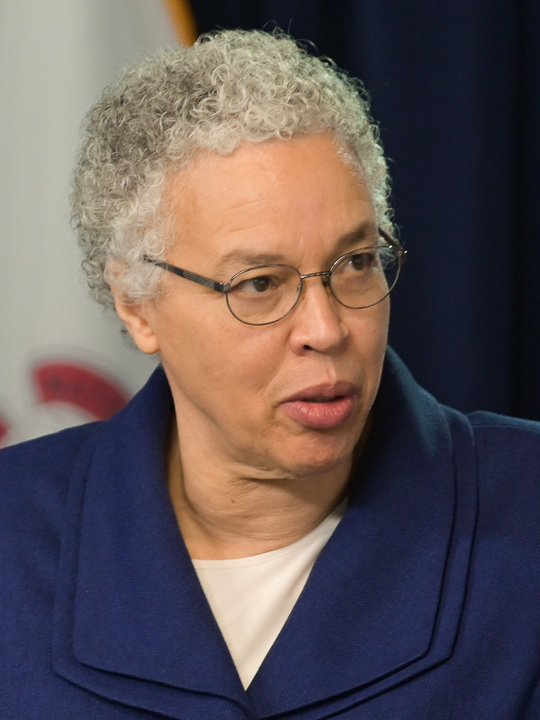

Nominee	Toni Preckwinkle	Michael Murphy
Party	Democratic	Libertarian
Popular vote	1,154,601	291,861
Percentage	79.82%	20.18%
President before election
Toni Preckwinkle
Democratic
Elected President
Toni Preckwinkle
Democratic

Incumbent Toni Preckwinkle, a Democrat, won re-election to a fifth term as county board president.

=== Democratic primary ===
Preckwinkle won re-nomination by her party for a fifth term as county board president.

==== Candidates ====
- Toni Preckwinkle, incumbent president
- Brendan Reilly, former president pro tempore of the Chicago City Council (2019–2023) from the 42nd ward (2007–present)

===== Declined =====
- Bridget Degnen, Cook County commissioner from the 12th district (2018–present)
- Bill Lowry, Cook County commissioner from the 3rd district (2018–present) (ran for re-election)

==== Endorsements ====
Toni Preckwinkle

U.S. senators

- Dick Durbin, Illinois (1997–present)

U.S. representatives

- Danny Davis, IL-07 (1997–present)
- Chuy García, IL-04 (2019–present)
- Jonathan Jackson, IL-01 (2023–present)
- Delia Ramirez, IL-03 (2023–present)
- Jan Schakowsky, IL-09 (1993–present)

Statewide officials

- JB Pritzker, governor of Illinois (2019–present)

Labor unions

- American Federation of State, County and Municipal Employees Council 31
- Chicago Federation of Labor
- Cook County College Teachers Union Local 1600
- International Union of Operating Engineers Locals 150 and 399
- SEIU Healthcare
- SEIU Illinois State Council
- Plumbers Local 130

Organizations

- Citizen Action Illinois
- Cook County Democratic Party
- Equality Illinois
- New Trier Democrats
- Sierra Club Illinois

Newspapers

- Daily Herald
Brendan Reilly

State legislators

- Michael Kelly, state representative from the 15th district (2021–present)

Local officials

- Felix Cardona Jr., Chicago alder from the 31st ward (2019–present)
- Bill Conway, Chicago alder from the 34th Ward (2023–present)
- Jim Gardiner, Chicago alder from the 45th ward (2015–present)
- Brian Hopkins, Chicago alder from the 2nd ward (2015–present)
- Anthony Napolitano, Chicago alder from the 41st ward (2015–present) (Independent)
- Matthew O'Shea, Chicago alder from the 19th ward (2011–present)
- Harry Osterman, former Chicago alder from the 48th ward (2011–2023)
- Eugene Schulter, former Chicago alder from the 47th ward (1975–2011)
- Debra Silverstein, Chicago alder from the 50th ward (2011–present)
- Silvana Tabares, Chicago alder from the 23rd ward (2018–present)
- Tom Tunney, former vice mayor of Chicago (2019–2023) and alder from the 44th ward (2003–2023)
- Scott Waguespack, Chicago alder from the 32nd ward (2007–present)

Individuals

- Willie Wilson, businessman

Labor unions

- Chicago Fire Fighters Union Local 2
- Chicago Fraternal Order of Police
- Illinois Fraternal Order of Police

Newspapers

- Chicago Tribune
Declined to endorse

Newspapers

- The Chicago Crusader

==== Polling ====
Poll source	Date(s) administered	Sample size	Margin of error	Toni Preckwinkle	Brendan Reilly	Undecided
M3 Strategies	March 14–15, 2026	465 (LV)	± 4.5%	55%	35%	10%
Tulchin Research (Note: This poll was sponsored by Preckwinkle's campaign)	October 27 – November 2, 2025	500 (LV)	± 4.4%	53%	22%	25%

Hypothetical polling

Toni Preckwinkle vs. "Someone Else"

Poll source	Date(s) administered	Sample size	Margin of error	Toni Preckwinkle	Someone Else	Undecided
Tulchin Research	February 20–25, 2025	500 (LV)	± 4.4%	58%	29%	13%

==== Results ====
2026 President of the Cook County Board of Commissioners Democratic primary
Party	Candidate	Votes	%
Democratic	Toni Preckwinkle (incumbent)	470,960	69.03
Democratic	Brendan Reilly	211,278	30.97
Total votes		682,238	100

=== Republican primary ===
In the Republican primary for county board president, one candidate filed for the ballot, but was removed from the ballot before the primary. Max Rice and Eric Wallace ran as write-in candidates.

2026 President of the Cook County Board of Commissioners Republican primary
Party	Candidate	Votes	%
write-in	Eric Wallace	1,727	94.58
write-in	Maxwell Rice	99	5.42
Total votes		1,826	100

=== Libertarian primary ===
Michael Murphy and write-in candidate Justin Tucker contested the Libertarian primary. Michael Murphy, a Chicago resident, prevailed.

2026 President of the Cook County Board of Commissioners Libertarian primary
Party	Candidate	Votes	%
Libertarian	Michael Murphy	2,512	99.92
write-in	Justin Tucker	2	0.08
Total votes		2,514	100

=== General election ===
2026 President of the Cook County Board of Commissioners election
Party	Candidate	Votes	%
Democratic	Thomas J. Dart (incumbent)	1,154,601	79.82
Libertarian	Michael Murphy	291,861	20.18
Total votes		1,446,462	100

== Cook County Board of Commissioners ==
2026 Cook County Board of Commissioners election
- November 3, 2026

All 17 seats on the Cook County Board of Commissioners 9 seats needed for a majority
	First party	Second party
Party	Democratic	Republican
Seats before	16	1
Seats after	17	0
Seat change	▲1	▼1
Popular vote	1,151,134	168,100
Percentage	87.25%	12.74%
Swing	▲12.37%	▼10.36%
- Results: Democratic gain Democratic hold Vote Share: 50–60% 60–70% 70–80% 80–90% >90%

The 2026 Cook County Board of Commissioners election saw all seventeen seats of the Cook County Board of Commissioners up for election to four-year terms. The election coinsides with other 2026 Cook County, Illinois, elections (including an election for the president of the Board of Commissioners) with the primary elections held on March 17, 2026, and the general election held on November 3, 2026.

The Republican Party ran nominees for only 8 of the 17 Board of Commissioners districts. Sean Morrison, the board's only Republican member, did not seek re-election. Democrats ultimately won all seats.

== Cook County Board of Review ==
2026 Cook County Board of Review election
- November 3, 2026

2of 3 seats on the Cook County Board of Review 2 seats needed for a majority
	First party
Party	Democratic
Seats before	3
Seats after	3
Seat change	Steady
Seats up	2
Races won	2

In the 2026 Cook County Board of Review election, two seats, both of which were Democratic-held, were up for reelection.

=== 1st district ===
==== Democratic primary ====
===== Candidates =====
- George Cardenas, incumbent commissioner
- Juanita Irizarry, former executive director of Friends of the Parks and candidate for Chicago's 26th ward in 2015

===== Endorsements =====
George Cardenas

State legislators

- Mary Beth Canty, state representative from the 54th district (2023–present)
- William Cunningham, President pro tempore of the Illinois Senate (2020–present) from the 18th district (2013–present)
- Frances Ann Hurley, former state representative from the 35th district (2013–2023)
- Laura Murphy, state senator from the 28th district (2015–present)
- Chris Welch, Speaker of the Illinois House of Representatives (2021–present) from the 7th district (2013–present)
- Michael Zalewski, former state representative from 23rd district (2008–2023)

Local officials

- Felix Cardona Jr., Chicago alder from the 31st ward (2019–present)
- John Daley, Cook County commissioner from the 11th district (1992–present)
- Jason Ervin, Chicago alder from the 28th ward (2011–present)
- Monica Gordon, Cook County Clerk (2024–present)
- Emma Mitts, Chicago alder from the 37th ward (2000–present)
- Kevin Morrison, Cook County commissioner from the 15th district (2018–present)
- Matthew O'Shea, Chicago alder from the 19th ward (2011–present)
- Marty Quinn, Chicago alder from the 13th ward (2011–present)
- Monique Scott, Chicago alder from the 24th ward (2022–present)
- Silvana Tabares, Chicago alder from the 23rd ward (2018–present)
- Gil Villegas, Chicago alder from the 36th ward (2015–present)

Labor unions

- International Union of Operating Engineers Local 150

Organizations

- Cook County Democratic Party
- Proviso Township Democrats
Juanita Irizarry

U.S. representatives

- Danny Davis, IL-07 (1997–present)
- Chuy García, IL-04 (2019–present)
- Marie Newman, former IL-03 (2021–2023)
- Delia Ramirez, IL-03 (2023–present)

State legislators

- Nicolle Grasse, state representative from the 53rd district (2024–present)
- Will Guzzardi, state representative from the 39th district (2015–present)
- Lilian Jiménez, state representative from the 4th district (2022–present)
- Lindsey LaPointe, state representative from the 19th district (2019–present)
- Abdelnasser Rashid, state representative from the 21st district (2023–present)
- Mark Walker, state senator from the 27th district (2024–present)

Local officials

- Scott Britton, Cook County commissioner from the 14th district (2018–present)
- Fritz Kaegi, Cook County Assessor (2018–present)
- Jessica Vasquez, Cook County commissioner from the 8th district (2025–present)

Labor unions

- American Federation of State, County and Municipal Employees Council 31

Organizations

- Citizen Action Illinois
- United Working Families

Newspapers

- Chicago Tribune
Declined to endorse

Labor unions

- Chicago Federation of Labor
- International Union of Operating Engineers Local 399
- Plumbers Local 130

Organizations

- New Trier Democrats

===== Results =====
2026 Cook County Board of Review 1st district Democratic primary
Party	Candidate	Votes	%
Democratic	George Cardenas (incumbent)	79,891	51.77
Democratic	Juanita Irizarry	74,428	48.23
Total votes		154,319	100

==== Republican primary ====
No candidate ran in the Republican primary.

==== General election ====
2026 Cook County Board of Review 1st district election
Party	Candidate	Votes	%
Democratic	George Cardenas (incumbent)	353,560	100
Total votes		353,560	100

=== 2nd district ===
==== Democratic primary ====
===== Candidates =====
- Liz Nicholson, consultant and wife of former NFL player Gerry Sullivan
- Samantha Steele, incumbent commissioner

===== Endorsements =====
Liz Nicholson

U.S. representatives

- Mike Quigley, IL-05 (2009–present)
- Jan Schakowsky, IL-09 (1993–present)

Statewide officials

- Jesse White, former Illinois Secretary of State (1999–2023)

State legislators

- Eva-Dina Delgado, state representative from the 3rd district (2019–present)
- Sara Feigenholtz, state senator from the 6th district (2020–present)
- La Shawn Ford, state representative from the 8th district (2007–present)
- Napoleon Harris, state senator from the 15th district (2013–present) and supervisor of Thornton Township (2025–present)
- Michael Hastings, state senator from the 19th district (2013–present)
- Mattie Hunter, state senator from the 3rd district (2003–present)
- Hoan Huynh, state representative from the 13th district (2023–present)
- Dan Kotowski, former state senator from the 28th district (2007–2015)
- Robert Martwick, state senator from the 10th district (2019–present)
- Antonio Munoz, former state senator from the 1st district (1999–2012)
- Laura Murphy, state senator from the 28th district (2015–present)
- Elgie Sims, state senator from the 17th district (2018–present)
- Ram Villivalam, state senator from the 8th district (2019–present)

Local officials

- Precious Brady-Davis, Metropolitan Water Reclamation District of Greater Chicago commissioner (2020–present)
- Walter Burnett Jr., former vice mayor of Chicago (2023–2025) and alder from the 27th ward (1995–2025)
- George Cardenas, Cook County Board of Review commissioner from the 1st district (2022–present)
- Felix Cardona Jr., Chicago alder from the 31st ward (2019–present)
- Stephanie Coleman, Chicago alder from the 16th ward (2019–present)
- Bill Conway, Chicago alder from the 34th Ward (2023–present)
- Jim Gardiner, Chicago alder from the 45th Ward (2019–present)
- Brian Hopkins, Chicago alder from the 2nd ward (2015–present)
- Bennett Lawson, Chicago alder from the 44th ward (2023–present)
- Matt Martin, Chicago alder from the 47th ward (2019–present)
- Samantha Nugent, president pro tempore of the Chicago City Council (2023–present) from the 39th ward (2019–present)
- Maria Pappas, Cook County Treasurer (1998–present)
- Toni Preckwinkle, President of the Cook County Board of Commissioners (2010–present)
- Brendan Reilly, former president pro tempore of the Chicago City Council (2019–2023) from the 42nd ward (2007–present)
- Larry Rogers Jr., Cook County Board of Review commissioner from the 3rd district (2004–present)
- Debra Silverstein, Chicago alder from the 50th ward (2011–present)
- Nicholas Sposato, Chicago alder from the 38th ward (2011–present)
- Chris Taliaferro, Chicago alder from the 29th ward (2015–present)
- Tom Tunney, former vice mayor of Chicago (2019–2023) and alder from the 44th ward (2003–2023)
- Anna Valencia, Chicago City Clerk (2017–present)

Labor unions

- Chicago Fraternal Order of Police
- Plumbers Local 130

Organizations

- Cook County Democratic Party
Samantha Steele

Labor unions

- American Federation of State, County and Municipal Employees Council 31
- International Union of Operating Engineers Locals 150 and 399

Newspapers

- The Chicago Crusader
Declined to endorse

Labor unions

- Chicago Federation of Labor

Organizations

- New Trier Democrats

Newspapers

- Chicago Tribune

===== Results =====
2026 Cook County Board of Review 2nd district Democratic primary
Party	Candidate	Votes	%
Democratic	Elizabeth "Liz" Nicholson	141,362	62.33
Democratic	Samantha Steele (incumbent)	85,444	37.67
Total votes		226,806	100

==== Republican primary ====
No candidate ran in the Republican primary.

==== General election ====
2026 Cook County Board of Review 2nd district election
Party	Candidate	Votes	%
Democratic	Elizabeth "Liz" Nicholson	330,183	100
Total votes		330,183	100

== Water Reclamation District Board ==
2026 Metropolitan Water Reclamation District of Greater Chicago election
- November 3, 2026

4 of 9 seats on the Metropolitan Water Reclamation District of Greater Chicago 5 seats needed for a majority
	First party	Second party
Party	Democratic	Republican
Seats before	9	0
Seats after	9	0
Seat change	0	0
Popular vote	4,166,330	752,674
Percentage	84.70%	15.30%
Swing	▲15.31%	▼12.47%
Seats up	4	0
Races won	4	0

In the 2026 Metropolitan Water Reclamation District of Greater Chicago election, three six-year term seats were up for a regularly scheduled election and an additional seat was upon for election to a partial term in a special election.

=== Regular election ===
Three seats with six-year terms were up for election in the regular election, with voters able to vote for up to three candidates. In both the primaries and general election, the top-three finishers were the winners.

==== Democratic primary ====
===== Candidates =====
- Precious Brady-Davis, incumbent commissioner
- Sarah Bury, attorney
- Beth McElroy Kirkwood, incumbent commissioner
- Eira Corral Sepúlveda, incumbent commissioner

===== Endorsements =====
Precious Brady-Davis

Statewide officials

- Alexi Giannoulias, Illinois Secretary of State (2023–present) (co-endorsement with McElroy Kirkwood and Corral Sepúlveda)

Labor unions

- Chicago Federation of Labor (co-endorsement with McElroy Kirkwood and Corral Sepúlveda)
- Chicago Teachers Union (co-endorsement with McElroy Kirkwood and Corral Sepúlveda)
- Cook County College Teachers Union Local 1600 (co-endorsement with McElroy Kirkwood and Corral Sepúlveda)
- International Union of Operating Engineers Locals 150 and 399 (co-endorsement with McElroy Kirkwood and Corral Sepúlveda)
- Plumbers Local 130 (co-endorsement with McElroy Kirkwood and Corral Sepúlveda)
- SEIU Healthcare (co-endorsement with McElroy Kirkwood and Corral Sepúlveda)
- SEIU Illinois State Council (co-endorsement with McElroy Kirkwood and Corral Sepúlveda)

Organizations

- Citizen Action Illinois (co-endorsement with McElroy Kirkwood and Corral Sepúlveda)
- Cook County Democratic Party (co-endorsement with McElroy Kirkwood and Corral Sepúlveda)
- Equality Illinois
- New Trier Democrats (co-endorsement with McElroy Kirkwood and Corral Sepúlveda)
- Sierra Club Illinois (co-endorsement with Bury and Corral Sepúlveda)

Newspapers

- The Chicago Crusader (co-endorsement with McElroy Kirkwood and Corral Sepúlveda)
- Chicago Tribune (co-endorsement with McElroy Kirkwood and Corral Sepúlveda)
Sarah Bury

Organizations

- LGBTQ Victory Fund
- Sierra Club Illinois (co-endorsement with Brady-Davis and Corral Sepúlveda)
Beth McElroy Kirkwood

Statewide officials

- Alexi Giannoulias, Illinois Secretary of State (2023–present) (co-endorsement with Brady-Davis and Corral Sepúlveda)

Labor unions

- Chicago Federation of Labor (co-endorsement with Brady-Davis and Corral Sepúlveda)
- Chicago Teachers Union (co-endorsement with Brady-Davis and Corral Sepúlveda)
- Cook County College Teachers Union Local 1600 (co-endorsement with Brady-Davis and Corral Sepúlveda)
- International Union of Operating Engineers Locals 150 and 399 (co-endorsement with Brady-Davis and Corral Sepúlveda)
- Plumbers Local 130 (co-endorsement with Brady-Davis and Corral Sepúlveda)
- SEIU Healthcare (co-endorsement with Brady-Davis and Corral Sepúlveda)
- SEIU Illinois State Council (co-endorsement with Brady-Davis and Corral Sepúlveda)

Organizations

- Citizen Action Illinois (co-endorsement with Brady-Davis and Corral Sepúlveda)
- Cook County Democratic Party (co-endorsement with Brady-Davis and Corral Sepúlveda)
- New Trier Democrats (co-endorsement with Brady-Davis and Corral Sepúlveda)
- Sierra Club Illinois (co-endorsement with Brady-Davis and Bury)

Newspapers

- The Chicago Crusader (co-endorsement with Brady-Davis and Corral Sepúlveda)
- Chicago Tribune (co-endorsement with Brady-Davis and Corral Sepúlveda)
Eira Corral Sepúlveda

Statewide officials

- Alexi Giannoulias, Illinois Secretary of State (2023–present) (co-endorsement with Brady-Davis and McElroy Kirkwood)

Labor unions

- Chicago Federation of Labor (co-endorsement with Brady-Davis and McElroy Kirkwood)
- Chicago Teachers Union (co-endorsement with Brady-Davis and McElroy Kirkwood)
- Cook County College Teachers Union Local 1600 (co-endorsement with Brady-Davis and McElroy Kirkwood)
- International Union of Operating Engineers Locals 150 and 399 (co-endorsement with Brady-Davis and McElroy Kirkwood)
- Plumbers Local 130 (co-endorsement with Brady-Davis and McElroy Kirkwood)
- SEIU Healthcare (co-endorsement with Brady-Davis and McElroy Kirkwood)
- SEIU Illinois State Council (co-endorsement with Brady-Davis and McElroy Kirkwood)

Organizations

- Citizen Action Illinois (co-endorsement with Brady-Davis and McElroy Kirkwood)
- Cook County Democratic Party (co-endorsement with Brady-Davis and McElroy Kirkwood)
- New Trier Democrats (co-endorsement with Brady-Davis and McElroy Kirkwood)
- Sierra Club Illinois (co-endorsement with Brady-Davis and McElroy Kirkwood)

Newspapers

- The Chicago Crusader (co-endorsement with Brady-Davis and McElroy Kirkwood)
- Chicago Tribune (co-endorsement with Brady-Davis and McElroy Kirkwood)

===== Results =====
2026 Metropolitan Water Reclamation District of Greater Chicago regular election Democratic primary
Party	Candidate	Votes	%
Democratic	Precious Brady-Davis (incumbent)	426,591	28.89
Democratic	Eira Corral Sepúlveda (incumbent)	411,072	27.84
Democratic	Beth McElroy Kirkwood (incumbent)	356,008	24.11
Democratic	Sarah Bury	283,080	19.17
Total votes		1,476,751	100

==== Republican primary ====
Only a single write-in candidate ran in the Republican primary.

2026 Metropolitan Water Reclamation District of Greater Chicago regular election Republican primary
Party	Candidate	Votes	%
write-in	Frank Rowder	727	100
Total votes		727	100

==== General election ====
2026 Metropolitan Water Reclamation District of Greater Chicago regular election
Party	Candidate	Votes	%
Democratic	Precious Brady-Davis (incumbent)	1,005,744	
Democratic	Eira Corral Sepúlveda (incumbent)	964,357	
Democratic	Beth McElroy Kirkwood (incumbent)	960,794	
Republican	Michelle Pennington	273,020	
Republican	Timothy E. Rueckert	243,311	
Republican	Jill B. Shestokas	236,343	
Total votes		3,683,569	100

=== Special election ===
A seat with a partial unexpired term was up for election.

==== Democratic primary ====
===== Candidates =====
- Cam Davis, incumbent commissioner

===== Endorsements =====
Cam Davis

Labor unions

- Cook County College Teachers Union Local 1600
- SEIU Healthcare
- SEIU Illinois State Council

Organizations

- Citizen Action Illinois
- Cook County Democratic Party
- New Trier Democrats
- Sierra Club Illinois

Newspapers

- The Chicago Crusader
Declined to endorse

Labor unions

- Chicago Federation of Labor
- International Union of Operating Engineers Locals 150 and 399
- Plumbers Local 130

===== Results =====
2026 Metropolitan Water Reclamation District of Greater Chicago special election Democratic primary
Party	Candidate	Votes	%
Democratic	Cam Davis (incumbent)	577,863	100
Total votes		577,863	100

==== Republican primary ====
No candidate ran in the Republican primary.

==== General election ====
2026 Metropolitan Water Reclamation District of Greater Chicago special election
Party	Candidate	Votes	%
Democratic	Cam Davis (incumbent)	1,235,435	100
Total votes		1,235,435	100

== Circuit Court of Cook County ==
Judicial elections to the Circuit Court of Cook County were also held.

== Other elections ==
Coinciding with the primaries, elections were held to elect both the Democratic and Republican committeepeople for the suburban townships.

== See also ==
- 2026 Illinois elections

== Notes ==
Partisan clients
