= 2022 Cook County, Illinois, elections =

- November 8, 2022

The Cook County, Illinois, general elections were held on November 8, 2022. Primaries were held on June 28, 2022.

Elections were held for Assessor, Clerk, Sheriff, Treasurer, President of the Cook County Board of Commissioners, all 17 seats of the Cook County Board of Commissioners, all three seats of the Cook County Board of Review, three seats on the Water Reclamation District Board, and judgeships on the Circuit Court of Cook County.

The Republican Party saw its representation on the Cook County Board of Commissioners reduced from two seats to a single seat. Cook County Commissioner Sean M. Morrison's victory by a margin of 2.58% in his district marked the only victory in a partisan county race for a Republican nominee, with Democrats winning all other partisan elections.

== Election information ==
2022 was a midterm election year in the United States. The primaries and general elections for Cook County races coincided with those for federal (House and Senate) and those for state elections.

In the primary, turnout among registered voters was 21.14%. Turnout among registered voters in suburban Cook County was 19.61%, with 319,825 ballots cast. Turnout among registered voters in the City of Chicago was 22.81%, with 341,901 ballots cast.

== Assessor ==
2022 Cook County Assessor election
- November 8, 2022
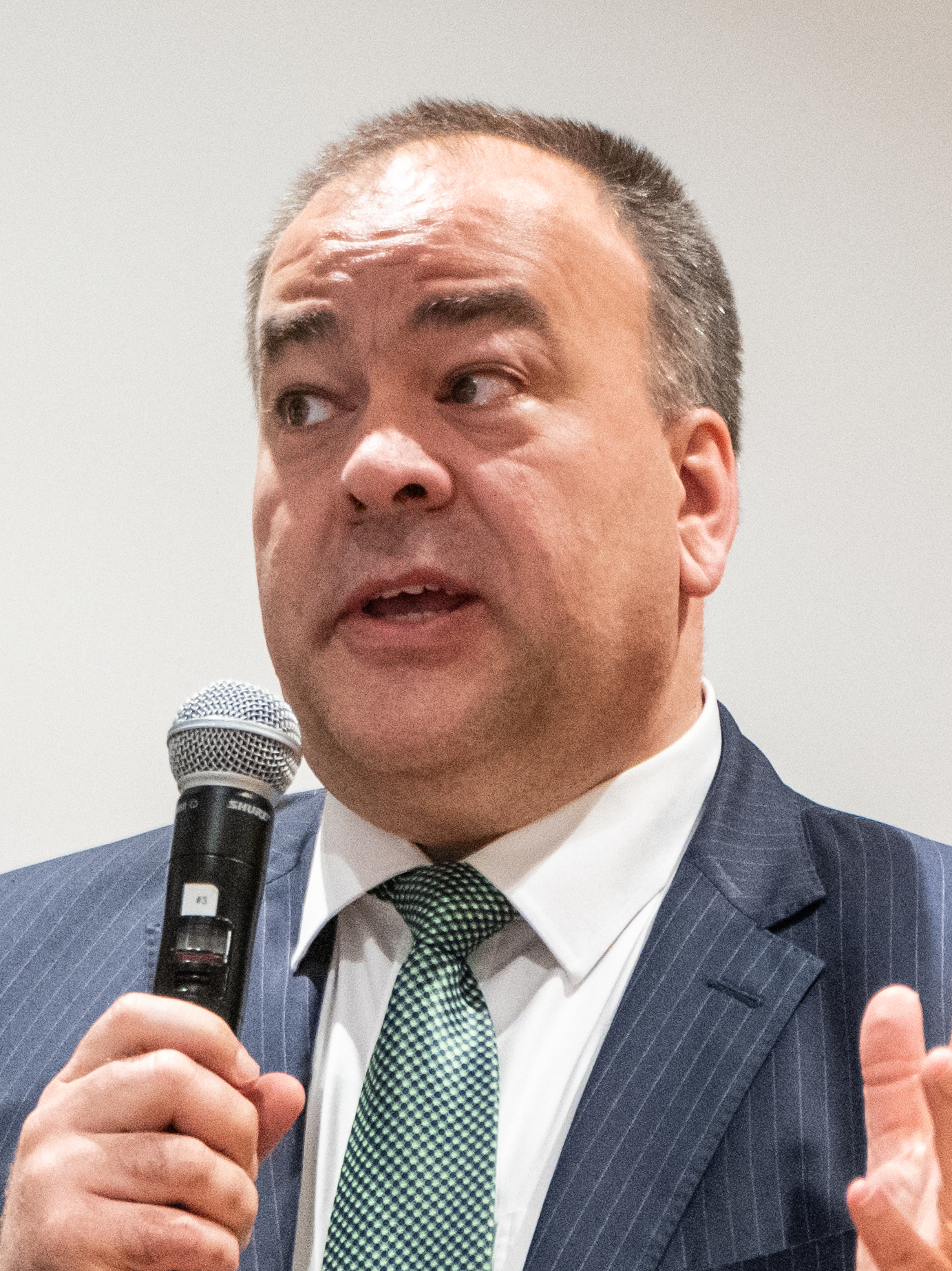

Nominee	Fritz Kaegi	Nico Tsatsoulis
Party	Democratic	Libertarian
Popular vote	1,063,188	228,425
Percentage	82.31%	17.69%
Assessor before election
Fritz Kaegi
Democratic
Elected Assessor
Fritz Kaegi
Democratic

First-term incumbent assessor Fritz Kaegi, a Democrat, was reelected to a second term.

=== Democratic primary ===
In the Democratic primary, the incumbent Kaegi was challenged by Metropolitan Water Reclamation District President Kari Steele.

==== Polling ====
Poll source	Date(s) administered	Sample size (Note: Key: A – all adults RV – registered voters LV – likely voters V – unclear)	Margin of error	Fritz Kaegi	Kari Steele	Undecided
Impact Research (D)	August 16–19, 2021	500 (LV)	± 4.4%	22%	21%	56%

==== Endorsements ====
Fritz Kaegi

State representatives

- Daniel Didech, state representative from the 59th district (2019–)
- Jennifer Gong-Gershowitz, state representative from the 17th district (2019–)
- Bob Morgan, state representative from the 58th district (2019–)

County officials

- Toni Preckwinkle, president of the Cook County Board of Commissioners

Mayors

- Roger Agpawa, mayor of Markham

Organizations

- Cook County Democratic Party
- Equality Illinois
Kari Steele

Statewide officials

- Jesse White, Illinois Secretary of State

County officials

- Karen Yarbrough, Cook County Clerk

Mayors

- Tiffany Henyard, mayor of Dolton

==== Results ====
2022 Cook County Assessor Democratic primary
Party	Candidate	Votes	%
Democratic	Fritz Kaegi	258,848	53.79
Democratic	Kari K. Steele	222,371	46.21
Total votes		481,219	100

=== Republican nomination ===
No candidates ran in the Republican primary.

=== Libertarian primary ===
Nico Tsatsoulis ran uncontested in the Libertarian primary for assessor.

2022 Cook County Assessor Libertarian primary
Party	Candidate	Votes	%
Libertarian	Nico Tsatsoulis	1,931	53.79
Total votes		1,931	100

=== General election ===
2022 Cook County Assessor election
Party	Candidate	Votes	%
Democratic	Fritz Kaegi	1,063,188	82.31
Libertarian	Nico Tsatsoulis	228,425	17.69
Total votes		1,291,613	100

== Clerk ==
2022 Cook County Clerk election
- November 8, 2022
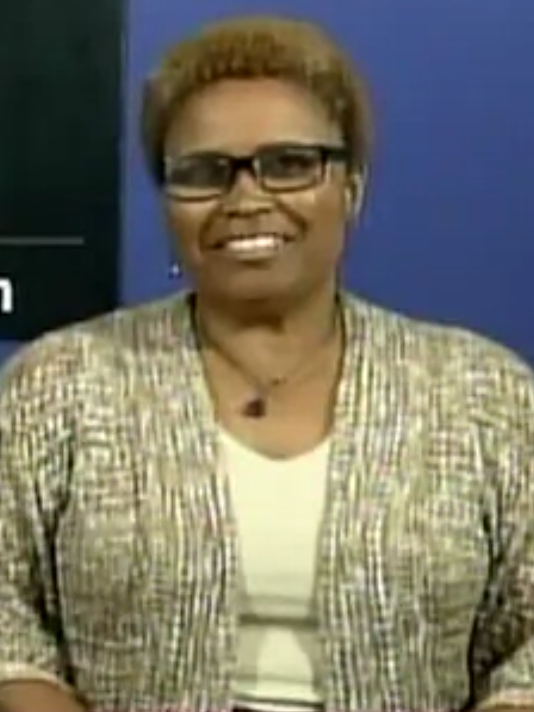

Nominee	Karen Yarbrough	Tony Peraica
Party	Democratic	Republican
Popular vote	1,003,854	368,095
Percentage	71.58%	26.25
Clerk before election
Karen Yarbrough
Democratic
Elected Clerk
Karen Yarbrough
Democratic

Incumbent clerk Karen Yarbrough, a Democrat, was reelected to a second term.

=== Democratic primary ===
Yarbrough ran uncontested in the Democratic primary.

2022 Cook County Clerk Democratic primary
Party	Candidate	Votes	%
Democratic	Karen A. Yarbrough (incumbent)	450,832	100
Total votes		450,832	100

=== Republican nomination ===
No candidate ran in the Republican primary. The Republican Party ultimately nominated former Cook County Commissioner Tony Peraica.

=== Libertarian primary ===
Joseph Schreiner, an occasional candidate for office and 2020 Illinois House of Representatives Libertarian candidate in District 19, ran uncontested in the Libertarian primary.

Marco Gomez expressed interest, but did not run.

2022 Cook County Clerk Libertarian primary
Party	Candidate	Votes	%
Libertarian	Joseph Schreiner	1,930	100
Total votes		1,930	100

=== General election ===
2022 Cook County Clerk election
Party	Candidate	Votes	%
Democratic	Karen A. Yarbrough (incumbent)	1,003,854	71.58
Republican	Tony Peraica	368,095	26.26
Libertarian	Joseph Schreiner	30,514	2.18
Total votes		1,402,463	100

== Sheriff ==
2022 Cook County Sheriff election
- November 8, 2022
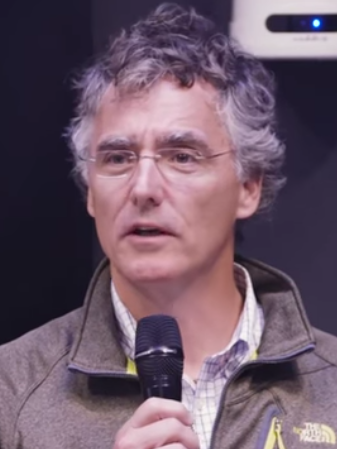

Nominee	Tom Dart	Lupe Aguirre
Party	Democratic	Republican
Popular vote	1,041,525	321,252
Percentage	74.21%	22.89%
Sheriff before election
Tom Dart
Democratic
Elected Sheriff
Tom Dart
Democratic

The incumbent sheriff Tom Dart, a Democrat, was reelected to a fifth term.

Only Democrats have held this office ever since Michael F. Sheahan unseated Republican James E. O'Grady in 1990.

=== Democratic primary ===
Dart was challenged in the Democratic primary by Noland Rivera, Carmen Navarro Gercone, LaTonya Ruffin, and Kirk Ortiz. Only Rivera made the ballot.

2022 Cook County Sheriff Democratic primary
Party	Candidate	Votes	%
Democratic	Thomas Dart (incumbent)	314,427	86.17
Democratic	Noland Rivera	50,455	13.83
Total votes		364,882	100

=== Republican nomination ===
No candidates ran in the Republican Party primary. The Republican Party later nominated Lupe Aguirre.

=== Libertarian primary ===
Cook County Sheriff's Department Deputy Brad Sandefur ran uncontested in the Libertarian primary after perennial candidate Richard Mayers was disqualified and removed from the ballot. Jack Kozlowski had expressed interest, but did not run.

2022 Cook County Sheriff Libertarian primary
Party	Candidate	Votes	%
Libertarian	Brad Sandefur	1,957	100
Total votes		1,957	100

=== General election ===
2022 Cook County Sheriff election
Party	Candidate	Votes	%
Democratic	Thomas Dart (incumbent)	1,041,525	74.21
Republican	Lupe Aguirre	321,252	22.89
Libertarian	Brad Sandefur	40,752	2.90
Total votes		1,403,529	100

== Treasurer ==
2022 Cook County Treasurer election
- November 8, 2022

Candidate	Maria Pappas	Peter Kopsaftis
Party	Democratic	Republican
Popular vote	1,063,160	314,013
Percentage	75.41%	22.27%
Treasurer before election
Maria Pappas
Democratic
Elected Treasurer
Maria Pappas
Democratic

Incumbent treasurer Maria Pappas, a Democrat, was reelected to a seventh term.

=== Democratic primary ===
Pappas ran unchallenged in the Democratic primary.

2022 Cook County Treasurer Democratic primary
Party	Candidate	Votes	%
Democratic	Maria Pappas (incumbent)	468,247	100
Total votes		468,247	100

=== Republican primary ===
No candidates ran in the Republican primary. The Republican Party later nominated Peter Kopsaftis.

=== Libertarian primary ===
Michael Murphy ran unchallenged in the Libertarian primary.

2022 Cook County Treasurer Libertarian primary
Party	Candidate	Votes	%
Libertarian	Michael Murphy	1,968	100
Total votes		1,968	100

=== General election ===
2022 Cook County Treasurer election
Party	Candidate	Votes	%
Democratic	Maria Pappas (incumbent)	1,063,160	75.41
Republican	Peter Kopsaftis	314,013	22.27
Libertarian	Michael Murphy	32,577	2.31
Total votes		1,409,750	100

== President of the Cook County Board of Commissioners ==
2022 President of the Cook County Board of Commissioners election
- November 8, 2022
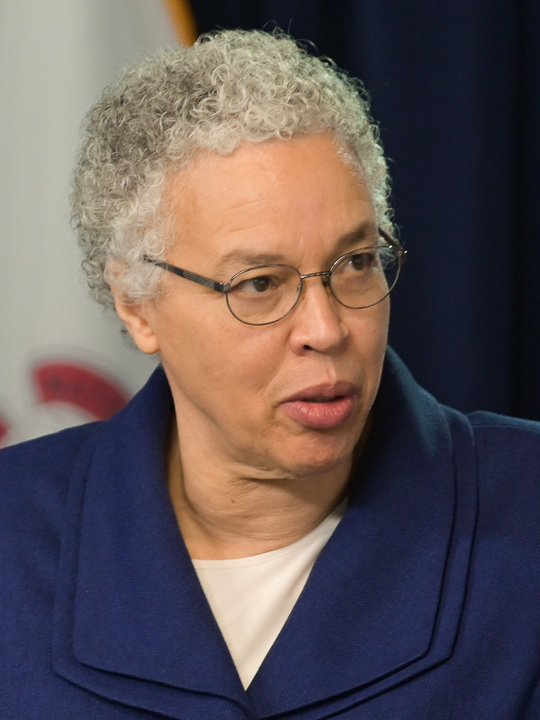

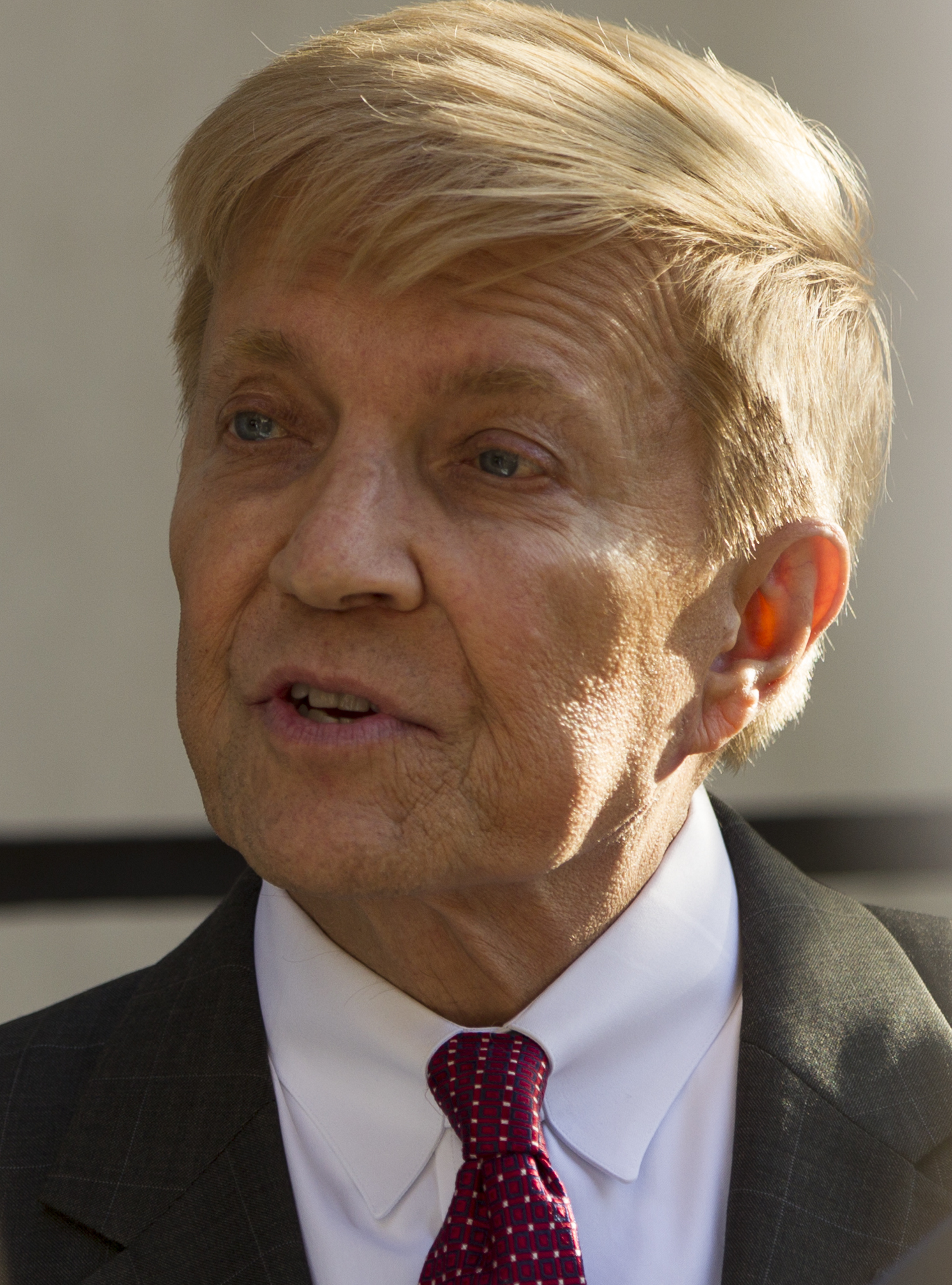
Nominee	Toni Preckwinkle	Bob Fioretti
Party	Democratic	Republican
Popular vote	967,062	399,339
Percentage	68.54%	28.30%
President before election
Toni Preckwinkle
Democratic
Elected President
Toni Preckwinkle
Democratic

Incumbent president Toni Preckwinkle, a Democrat, was elected to a fourth term.

=== Democratic primary ===
Community activist Zerlina Smith-Members and former Cook County Commissioner Richard Boykin challenged Preckwinkle in the Democratic primary. Only Boykins made the ballot.

2022 President of the Cook County Board of Commissioners Democratic primary
Party	Candidate	Votes	%
Democratic	Toni Preckwinkle (incumbent)	374,699	75.76
Democratic	Richard Boykin	119,915	24.24
Total votes		494,614	100

=== Republican primary ===
No candidates ran in the Republican primary. Subsequently, Bob Fioretti, who previously ran for the office in the Democratic primary in 2018, was nominated by the Republican Party.

=== Libertarian primary ===
Thea Tsatsos, a 2002 candidate for U.S. House of Representatives in District 1, ran unchallenged in the Libertarian primary.

Ruben Pantoja considered running, but did not file.

2022 President of the Cook County Board of Commissioners Libertarian primary
Party	Candidate	Votes	%
Libertarian	Thea Tsatsos	1,992	100
Total votes		1,992	100

=== General election ===
2022 President of the Cook County Board of Commissioners election
Party	Candidate	Votes	%
Democratic	Toni Preckwinkle (incumbent)	967,062	68.54
Republican	Bob Fioretti	399,339	28.30
Libertarian	Thea Tsatsos	44,615	3.16
Total votes		1,441,016	100

== Cook County Board of Commissioners ==
2022 Cook County Board of Commissioners election
- November 8, 2022

All 17 seats on the Cook County Board of Commissioners 9 seats needed for a majority
	First party	Second party
Party	Democratic	Republican
Seats before	15	2
Seats won	16	1
Seat change	▲1	▼1
Popular vote	1,013,467	299,095
Percentage	74.88%	22.10%
Swing	▼6.91%	▲3.88%

The 2022 Cook County Board of Commissioners election saw all 17 seats of the Cook County Board of Commissioners up for election to four-year terms.

As this was the first election held following the 2020 United States census, the seats faced redistricting before this election. A new map was unanimously adopted by the Cook County Board of Commissioners in September 2021.

Democrats won 16 seats, while Republicans won only a single seat.

== Cook County Board of Review ==
2022 Cook County Board of Review election
- November 8, 2022

3 of 3 seats on the Cook County Board of Review 2 seats needed for a majority
	First party
Party	Democratic
Seats before	3
Seats after	3
Seat change	Steady

in In the 2022 Cook County Board of Review election, all three seats, all of which were Democratic-held, were up for reelection.

The Cook County Board of Review has its three seats rotate the length of terms. In a staggered fashion (in which no two seats have coinciding two-year terms), the seats rotate between two consecutive four-year terms and a two-year term. This was the first year since 2012 that all three seats were coincidingly up for election.

The seats faced redistricting before this election.

=== 1st district ===
Democratic nominee George Cardenas, a Chicago alderman, won the general election without an opponent. First-term Commissioner Tammy Wendt, a Democrat first elected in 2020, had been defeated for renomination by Cardenas. This election was for a four-year term.

==== Democratic primary ====
Candidates

- George Cardenas Chicago Alderman, 12th ward, 2003–present
- Tammy Wendt, incumbent commissioner of the Board of Review

Results

2022 Cook County Board of Review 1st district Democratic primary
Party	Candidate	Votes	%
Democratic	George A. Cardenas	61,278	57.24
Democratic	Tammy Wendt (incumbent)	45,781	42.76
Total votes		107,059	100

==== Republican primary ====
No candidates ran in the Republican primary.

==== General election ====
2022 Cook County Board of Review 1st district election
Party	Candidate	Votes	%
Democratic	George A. Cardenas	289,067	100
Total votes		289,067	100

=== 2nd district ===
Democratic nominee Samantha Steele won election to the 2nd district seat. Incumbent second-term Commissioner Michael Cabonargi, a Democrat, was defeated for renomination by Steele in the Democratic primary. This election was for a four-year term.

==== Democratic primary ====
2022 Cook County Board of Review 2nd district Democratic primary
Party	Candidate	Votes	%
Democratic	Samantha Steele	90,293	52.42
Democratic	Michael Cabonargi (incumbent)	81,970	47.58
Total votes		172,263	100

==== Republican primary ====
No candidates ran in the Republican primary.

==== General election ====
2022 Cook County Board of Review 2nd district election
Party	Candidate	Votes	%
Democratic	Samantha Steele	413,835	100
Total votes		413,835	100

=== 3rd district ===
Incumbent commissioner Larry Rogers, Jr., a Democrat, was reelected to a sixth term. He was unopposed in both the Democratic primary and the general election. This election was for a two-year term.

==== Democratic primary ====
2022 Cook County Board of Review 3rd district Democratic primary
Party	Candidate	Votes	%
Democratic	Larry Rogers, Jr. (incumbent)	160,923	100
Total votes		160,923	100

==== Republican primary ====
No candidates ran in the Republican primary.

==== General election ====
2022 Cook County Board of Review 3rd district election
Party	Candidate	Votes	%
Democratic	Larry Rogers Jr. (incumbent)	375,518	100
Total votes		375,518	100

== Water Reclamation District Board ==
2022 Metropolitan Water Reclamation District of Greater Chicago election
- November 8, 2022

4 of 9 seats on the Metropolitan Water Reclamation District of Greater Chicago 5 seats needed for a majority
	First party	Second party	Third party
Party	Democratic	Green	Republican
Seats before	9	0	0
Seats after	9	0	0
Seat change	Steady	Steady	Steady
Popular vote	3,315,769	479,394	365,671
Percentage	79.88%	11.55%	8.81%
Swing	▲2.34%	▼10.91%	new
Seats up	4	0	0
Races won	4	0	0

In the 2022 Metropolitan Water Reclamation District of Greater Chicago election, three six-year term seats were up for a regularly scheduled election and an additional seat was upon for election to a partial term in a special election.

=== Regular election ===
Three seats with six-year terms were up for election in the regular election, with voters able to vote for up to three candidates. In both the primaries and general election, the top-three finishers were the winners.

Incumbent Democrat Mariyana Spyropoulos was reelected alongside New Democratic members Yumeka Brown and Patricia Theresa Flynn. Incumbent Democrats Josina Morita and Barbara McGowan did not seek reelection.

==== Democratic primary ====
Incumbent Mariyana Spyropoulos was renominated. Among the unsuccessful candidates was former commissioner Rick Avila.

2022 Metropolitan Water Reclamation District of Greater Chicago regular election Democratic primary
Party	Candidate	Votes	%
Democratic	Mariyana T. Spyropoulos (incumbent)	257,580	22.24
Democratic	Patricia Theresa Flynn	201,003	17.35
Democratic	Yumeka Brown	185,222	15.99
Democratic	Sharon Waller	149,165	12.88
Democratic	Precious W. Brady-Davis	126,672	10.94
Democratic	Frank Avila	99,815	8.62
Democratic	Rick Garcia	76,019	6.56
Democratic	Cristina P. Nonato	62,738	5.42
Total votes		1,158,214	100

==== Republican primary ====
Only one candidate, R. Cary Capparelli, ran in the Republican primary.

2022 Metropolitan Water Reclamation District of Greater Chicago regular election Republican primary
Party	Candidate	Votes	%
Republican	R. Cary Capparelli	100,427	100
Total votes		100,427	100

==== Green nomination ====
The Green Party nominated only one candidate, Mark E. Buettner.

=== General election ===
2022 Metropolitan Water Reclamation District of Greater Chicago regular election
Party	Candidate	Votes	%
Democratic	Mariyana T. Spyropoulos (incumbent)	865,103	29.56
Democratic	Patricia Theresa Flynn	766,291	26.18
Democratic	Yumeka Brown	710,037	24.26
Republican	R. Cary Capparelli	365,671	12.49
Green	Mark E. Buettner	219,771	7.51
Total votes		2,926,813	100

=== Special election ===
A seat with a partial unexpired term was up for election. Incumbent Perry D. Chakena, who had been appointed to fill the vacancy, unsuccessfully sought the Democratic Party nomination to finish the partial term that she had been appointed to.

==== Democratic primary ====
2022 Metropolitan Water Reclamation District of Greater Chicago special election Democratic primary
Party	Candidate	Votes	%
Democratic	Daniel "Pogo" Pogorzelski	156,746	35.99
Democratic	Elizabeth Joyce	154,754	35.54
Democratic	Chakena D. Perry (incumbent)	123,993	28.47
Total votes		435,493	100

==== Republican nomination ====
No candidate ran in the Republican primary

==== Green nomination ====
The Green Party nominated Toneal M. Jackson.

2022 Metropolitan Water Reclamation District of Greater Chicago special election
Party	Candidate	Votes	%
Democratic	Daniel "Pogo" Pogorzelski	974,338	78.96
Green	Toneal M. Jackson	259,623	21.04
Total votes		1,223,961	100

== Circuit Court of Cook County ==
Judicial elections to the Circuit Court of Cook County were also held. All 61 justices up for retention elections were retained. There were 29 partisan elections to fill judicial vacancies. Democratic nominees won all of these, with only one judicial race having a competitive general election (featuring a Republican Party opponent).

== Other elections ==
Coinciding with the primaries, elections were held to elect both the Democratic and Republican committeepeople for the suburban townships.

== See also ==
- 2022 Illinois elections
