= Iris Martinez =

American politician

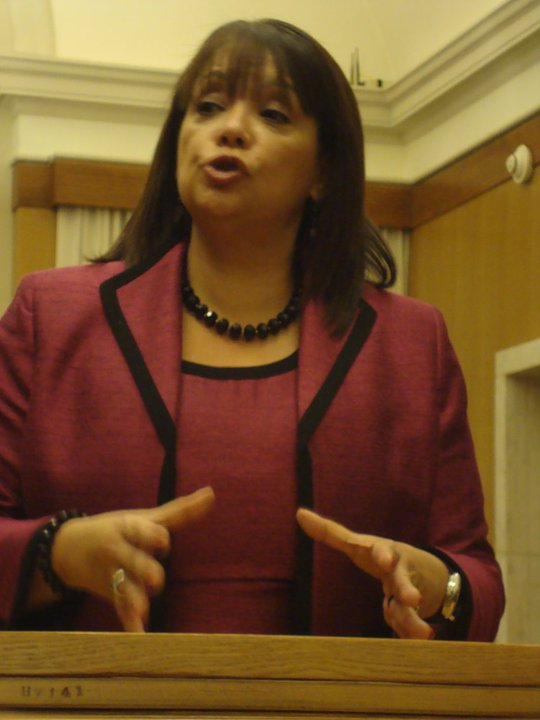
- Martinez in 2011

Clerk of the Circuit Court of Cook County
- In office December 1, 2020 – December 1, 2024
- Preceded by: Dorothy Brown
- Succeeded by: Mariyana Spyropoulos

Member of the Illinois Senate from the 20th district
- In office January 8, 2003 – November 2020
- Preceded by: Peter Roskam (redistricted)
- Succeeded by: Cristina Pacione-Zayas

Personal details
- Born: February 25, 1956 (age 70) Chicago, Illinois, U.S.
- Party: Democratic
- Education: Northeastern Illinois University (BA); University of Illinois, Chicago (attended)

Iris Y. Martinez (born February 25, 1956) is a former American politician and administrator. In 2020, she was elected clerk of the Circuit Court of Cook County. She previously served as a member of the Illinois Senate, representing the 20th district from 2003 until becoming clerk. A member of the Democratic Party, she rose to Assistant Majority Leader in the State Senate. She was the first Latina to have held either the office of court clerk or Illinois state senator.

== Early life ==
Martinez is a graduate of Northeastern Illinois University and the University of Illinois at Chicago.

== Senate career ==
Martinez was the first Latina woman to be elected to the Illinois State Senate. In her first year in Springfield, Martinez ensured that community agencies like the Children's Place, an agency that works with children and families affected by HIV and AIDS, and Concordia Avondale Community Center, which provides daycare, after-school programs and a center for seniors, received state funding to continue their programming. In 2003 Martinez sponsored legislation, introduced by then-Representative Sara Feigenholtz and later signed into law by Governor Rod Blagojevich, that requires health insurance companies to provide women with contraceptive coverage. In recognition of this legislation, Martinez received the Profile in Courage Award from Planned Parenthood. Martinez targeted Illinois drivers with out of state reckless homicide and DUI convictions with the passage of a new law. This law ensures that convictions received in other states are included in Illinois driving records and subject to state laws regarding further prosecution of these offences. To help protect consumers from becoming victims of identity theft, Martinez helped pass a law that requires all insurance cards be issued without a Social Security number.

In 2004, Martinez was awarded the Hillary Clinton Leadership Award, presented to an elected official by the Illinois Democratic Women's organization. Martinez was the Chairperson of the Pensions Committee and Vice Chairperson of the Housing and Community Affairs Committee, and was a member of three additional committees: Commerce, Health and Human Services, and Insurance.

In 2006, Martinez endorsed judicial candidate Ramon Ocasio III over the Cook County Democratic Party endorsed candidate, Ed Lechowicz, the son of former State Senator Ted Lechowicz, saying she did so to increase the number of Latinos on the Cook County judiciary.

In 2008, Martinez faced a primary challenge from state representative Richard T. Bradley, who represented half of her district in the House. Bradley had originally announced his intention to seek re-election to his former seat in the Illinois House but decided instead to challenge Martinez when Deb Mell announced her candidacy for his House seat. Martinez was re-elected, defeating Bradley and another candidate.

In 2018, J. B. Pritzker appointed Martinez to Powering Illinois' Future transition committee, which is responsible for infrastructure and clean energy policies.

After her election to serve as the Clerk of the Circuit Court, local party leaders appointed Cristina Pacione-Zayas to the seat.

== Clerk of the Circuit Court of Cook County ==
On August 14, 2019, Cook County Circuit Clerk Dorothy Brown announced that she would not seek reelection in 2020. Martinez later announced that she would seek the Democratic nomination for Circuit Clerk. Despite not being endorsed by the Cook County Democratic Party, Martinez won the primary with 33.73% of the vote and 50,000 more votes than party-endorsed candidate Michael Cabonargi. In addition to failing to receive the party's endorsement in the primary, she had also failed to receive other notable endorsements. Consequentially, her primary victory was regarded as an upset.

Martinez won the general election and was sworn in on December 1, 2020. She is the first Latina to serve in the position, and the second woman of color to hold the position.

Soon after taking office, Martinez complained about the state of the office she inherited from Dorothy Brown. In response, Brown released a statement that was highly critical of Martinez.

In November 2022, Martinez announced that the office of the clerk of courts had been relieved of federal oversight of its hiring and employment practices. The office had been under this oversight since August 2018 during the tenure of her predecessor.

Since assuming the office of Clerk of the Circuit Court of Cook County, Martinez has come under fire for her office's hiring practices and use of political patronage. In March 2022, WBEZ reported that Martinez's office hired a former City of Evanston human resources director who was facing disciplinary review for "mishandling of sexual misconduct complaints from teenage girls and young women who worked at the city's beaches" and was found to be "primarily at fault for Evanston's yearlong delay in looking into the "pervasive" harassment and abuse suffered by lifeguards and other beach workers."

In December 2022, the Chicago Tribune reported that 23 employees of the Clerk of the Circuit Court of Cook County's office hired by Iris Martinez performed political work for the 33rd Ward aldermanic campaign of Samie Martinez, a political protégé of Martinez, raising concerns about machine influence on the race.

In March 2022, Martinez hosted Chicago Fraternal Order of Police (FOP) Lodge 7 president John Catanzara, a vocal supporter of former president Donald Trump, at a fundraiser for her ward political organization. Martinez also accepted $7,000 in campaign contributions from Catanzara's FOP Lodge 7. Later that year, she endorsed Erin Jones, a Northwest Side GOP Club committeeman and supporter of Donald Trump's effort to overturn the 2020 election, in a Democratic party primary for State Senate as part of a slate of candidates backed by both Martinez and the FOP. Martinez's support from and for MAGA Republican figures running in Democratic primaries drew sharp criticism from local progressive organizations. In June 2022, the FOP slate suffered "landslide" losses in the Democratic primaries, and Martinez lost her Democratic Party State Central Committee seat to Delia Ramirez.

In January 2023, the Chicago Sun-Times reported that "more than 50 employees of Cook County Clerk of Court Iris Martinez" were under investigation for allegedly defrauding the federal Paycheck Protection Program loan program "intended to help small businesses struggling during the COVID-19 pandemic." By April, "dozens" of these employees had been fired or otherwise resigned.

In May 2023, WBEZ reported that the Clerk's office under Martinez had been erroneously putting felonies on the records of people who had successfully completed diversion programs for a period of at least 3 years, resulting in losses of housing, employment, and education opportunities for victims of the mistakes. After first being contacted by WBEZ, Martinez's office accepted responsibility for the issue and claimed to have already corrected it, but when notified of examples of erroneous felony records still existing the office deflected blame onto Cook County Chief Judge Timothy C. Evans.

In February 2024, Illinois Answers Project reported that the Clerk's office under Martinez violated Illinois juvenile court laws by exposing the personal data of at least 5,000 children, leaving the information publicly available for nearly two weeks. In response to the breach, Cook County Public Defender Sharone Mitchell characterized Martinez's tenure as Clerk as "an out-and-out, complete failure to operate the system." While the Clerk's office itself "did not dispute that the data exposure violated the state’s juvenile court laws," Martinez characterized the report as "lies and misinformation."

Martinez failed to win reelection in 2024, losing the Democratic primary to Metropolitan Water Reclamation District Commissioner Mariyana T. Spyropoulos.

== Democratic Party leadership roles ==
Martinez was elected to the Democratic Party of Illinois State Central Committee in 2002, and to the Cook County Democratic Party Committee in 2020. In 2022, she lost her seat on the Democratic Party State Committee to Delia Ramirez. In 2024, she was defeated in her bid for re-election as 33rd Ward Democratic Committeeperson by Rossana Rodriguez-Sanchez

== Electoral history ==
=== State Senate ===
2002

2002 Illinois State Senate 20th district Democratic Primary
Party	Candidate	Votes	%
Democratic	Iris Y. Martinez	13,839	61.51
Democratic	Michael A. Wojcik	8,660	38.49
Total votes		22,499	100

2002 Illinois State Senate 20th district election
Party	Candidate	Votes	%
Democratic	Iris Y. Martinez	26,410	100
Total votes		26,410	100

2004

2004 Illinois State Senate 20th district Democratic Primary
Party	Candidate	Votes	%
Democratic	Iris Y. Martinez (incumbent)	14,164	100
Total votes		14,164	100

2004 Illinois State Senate 20th district election
Party	Candidate	Votes	%
Democratic	Iris Y. Martinez (incumbent)	38,815	100
Total votes		38,815	100

2008

2008 Illinois State Senate 20th district Democratic Primary
Party	Candidate	Votes	%
Democratic	Iris Y. Martinez (incumbent)	13,649	51.25
Democratic	Richard T. Bradley	11,128	41.78
Democratic	Carlos Juan Guevara	1,857	6.97
Total votes		26,634	100

2008 Illinois State Senate 20th district election
Party	Candidate	Votes	%
Democratic	Iris Y. Martinez (incumbent)	42,310	100
Total votes		42,310	100

2012

2012 Illinois State Senate 20th district Democratic Primary
Party	Candidate	Votes	%
Democratic	Iris Y. Martinez (incumbent)	10,429	100
Total votes		10,429	100

2012 Illinois State Senate 20th district election
Party	Candidate	Votes	%
Democratic	Iris Y. Martinez (incumbent)	47,688	99.85
Write-In	Lawrence "Larry" Ligas	73	0.15
Total votes		47,761	100

2016

2016 Illinois State Senate 20th district Democratic Primary
Party	Candidate	Votes	%
Democratic	Iris Y. Martinez (incumbent)	37,221	100
Total votes		37,221	100

2016 Illinois State Senate 20th district election
Party	Candidate	Votes	%
Democratic	Iris Y. Martinez (incumbent)	60,418	100
Total votes		60,418	100

2018

2016 Illinois State Senate 20th district Democratic Primary
Party	Candidate	Votes	%
Democratic	Iris Y. Martinez (incumbent)	19,414	73.36
Democratic	Bart Goldberg	7,050	26.64
Total votes		26,464	100

2018 Illinois State Senate 20th district election
Party	Candidate	Votes	%
Democratic	Iris Y. Martinez (incumbent)	55,151	100
Total votes		55,151	100

=== Clerk of the Cook County Circuit Court ===
2020

2020 Clerk of the Circuit Court of Cook County Democratic primary
Party	Candidate	Votes	%
Democratic	Iris Y. Martinez	269,578	33.67
Democratic	Michael M. Cabonargi	216,180	27.00
Democratic	Richard R. Boykin	199,526	24.92
Democratic	Jacob Meister	113,855	14.22
Write-in	Others	1,511	0.19
Total votes		800,650	100

2020 Clerk of the Circuit Court of Cook County election
Party	Candidate	Votes	%
Democratic	Iris Y. Martinez	1,549,615	73.03
Republican	Barbara Bellar	572,169	26.97
Total votes		2,121,784	100

2024

2024 Clerk of the Circuit Court of Cook County Democratic primary
Party	Candidate	Votes	%
Democratic	Mariyana T. Spyropoulos	329,635	65.17
Democratic	Iris Y. Martinez (incumbent)	176,195	34.83
Total votes		505,830	100.0
