= Monica Gordon =

- Monica Gordon in 2024

Clerk of Cook County
- Incumbent
- Assumed office December 2, 2024
- Preceded by: Karen Yarbrough & Cedric Giles (Interim)

Member of the Cook County Board of Commissioners from the 5th district
- In office December 5, 2022 – December 2, 2024
- Preceded by: Deborah Sims
- Succeeded by: Kisha McCaskill

Personal details
- Born: September 5, 1977 Chicago, IL, U.S.
- Education: Northern Illinois University (BA); Governors State University (MA)

Monica Gordon is an American politician and public administrator serving as the Cook County Clerk since 2024. She previously served as a member of the Cook County Board of Commissioners, representing the 5th district from 2022 to 2024. Gordon became the youngest woman and third African American elected to the office of Cook County Clerk when she was sworn into office on December 2, 2024.

As Cook County Clerk, Gordon oversees one of the largest consolidated clerk's offices in the United States, administering elections in suburban Cook County, maintaining vital records and land records, supporting the legislative functions of the Cook County Board, and overseeing key responsibilities within the county's property tax system.

== Early life and education ==
Gordon was born on September 5, 1977, raised on the West Side of Chicago, and graduated from Lane Tech College Prep High School.

She earned a Bachelor of Arts degree in Journalism from Northern Illinois University in 1999 and a Master of Arts degree in Communication and Training from Governors State University in 2002.

Prior to holding elected office, Gordon worked in government affairs, public policy, and nonprofit leadership, developing experience in community engagement, legislative advocacy, and higher education administration.

== Early career ==
Gordon served as Executive Director of the Illinois Legislative Black Caucus Foundation, where she directed advocacy, communications, fundraising, and public policy initiatives.

She later served as Director of Government Affairs and Community Relations at Chicago State University, overseeing relationships with local, state, and federal government officials and coordinating community partnerships.

Gordon also served as Chair of the Board of Trustees of Prairie State College.

== Cook County Commissioner ==
In 2022, Gordon was elected to the Cook County Board of Commissioners from the 5th District, succeeding longtime Commissioner Deborah Sims.

During her tenure on the board, Gordon helped oversee a county budget exceeding $9 billion and served as Vice Chair of the Transportation Committee. Her policy priorities included public health, violence prevention, economic development, and transportation infrastructure.

As commissioner, she advocated for increased investment in South Suburban communities and supported initiatives related to healthcare access, workforce development, and equitable economic growth.

== Cook County Clerk ==
=== Election ===
Following the death of Cook County Clerk Karen Yarbrough in 2024, Gordon emerged as a candidate to succeed her. She won the Democratic nomination and was elected Cook County Clerk in the November 2024 special election.

She was sworn into office on December 2, 2024.

=== Responsibilities ===
As Cook County Clerk, Gordon serves as the chief election authority for suburban Cook County and manages:

- Elections and Voter Registration
- Vital Records
- Recording Operations
- Real Estate and Tax Services
- Clerk of the Board operations
- Veterans Services

Cook County is home to more than five million residents, while the Clerk's Office administers elections for approximately 1.7 million registered voters in suburban Cook County.

== Clerkship initiatives ==
=== Election administration ===
Gordon's tenure has focused heavily on election modernization, security, accessibility, and voter engagement.

=== Election Lens ===
In 2026, the Cook County Clerk's Office debuted Election Lens, a real-time election management and data platform developed in partnership with election technology provider KNOWiNK.

The system provides election administrators with live information regarding voter turnout, equipment status, operational issues, and polling place activity. The program was described by the Clerk's Office as the first deployment of its kind.

=== Smart ballot drop boxes ===
In 2025, Gordon announced the launch of a pilot "smart ballot drop box" program.

Developed in partnership with Runbeck Election Services, the system incorporates ballot envelope scanning, voter tracking technology, surveillance capabilities, and chain-of-custody monitoring intended to improve transparency and voter confidence in vote-by-mail operations.

The pilot debuted ahead of the 2026 Illinois gubernatorial primary election.

=== Election security ===
Under Gordon, the Clerk's Office expanded its election security and logistics technology, including enhanced GPS tracking for more than 1,400 Voting Supply Carriers and a new Election Management System with real-time reporting capabilities. The office also integrated GPS tracking of election equipment into its broader election-management system to improve visibility into polling-place operations and election logistics.

=== High School Early Voting Program ===
Gordon established a High School Early Voting Program that allows students to participate in election administration and operate polling locations.

Launched in partnership with the Chicago Bears, the initiative was designed to increase civic participation among young voters and provide students with firsthand experience in the electoral process.

The program received national recognition in 2026 from the U.S. Election Assistance Commission and the National Association of Counties (NACo).

=== Language access ===
A major focus of Gordon's administration has been expanding language accessibility across Clerk's Office operations.

The office provides election materials and voter information in twelve languages, one of the most extensive language-access programs among election jurisdictions in the United States.

In 2025, the Clerk's Office deployed Pocketalk translation devices across multiple service divisions, providing real-time translation assistance in more than 90 languages.

Gordon has also advocated for increased recruitment of multilingual election judges and expanded language assistance resources for voters and residents seeking county services.

== Government modernization ==
=== Clerk Recording System ===
Gordon continued the expansion of the Clerk Recording System (CRS), an internally developed records management platform used to modernize land and public records operations.

The Clerk's Office received a 2025 National Association of Counties (NACo) Achievement Award for Innovation for the Clerk Recording System. The Office later reported that jurisdictions in Illinois and elsewhere had begun replicating the system.

=== Historic land records digitization ===
During Gordon's first year, the Clerk's Office also undertook a large-scale project to digitize and preserve historic Cook County land records dating to 1871; by the end of 2025, the office reported processing more than 36.5 million images and pages.

=== Digital services ===
During Gordon's tenure, the Clerk's Office expanded online services, including:

- Electronic recording services
- Real-time document tracking
- Online indexing corrections
- Appointment scheduling systems
- Virtual queue management

The office also developed new cashiering systems that it projected would save $275,000 annually in licensing and management fees.

=== Property fraud prevention ===
Under Gordon, the Clerk's Office expanded its Property After Death and Property Fraud Prevention outreach, holding public forums designed to educate residents about transferring family property and reducing the risk of property fraud.

=== Veterans' services ===
During Gordon's tenure, the office expanded outreach efforts promoting the free recording of military discharge documents (DD-214s) and increased engagement with veterans’ organizations throughout Cook County.

=== Diversity, equity and inclusion ===
In 2025, Gordon announced the creation of the Clerk's Office's first Deputy Clerk of diversity, equity, and inclusion position.

Her administration also created an internal DEI committee tasked with examining accessibility, workplace culture, and service delivery practices. The committee also implemented mandatory DEI training and education for department heads, managers, and employees.

=== Political activities ===
Gordon was elected Democratic Committeeperson for Bloom Township in 2022.

She has been active in Democratic Party organizations throughout Illinois and previously served as Treasurer of Illinois Democratic Women.

=== Civic and professional affiliations ===
Gordon has served on or held leadership positions with several civic and professional organizations, including:

- National Organization of Black County Officials (NOBCO), board member
- National Association of Counties (NACo) Transportation Steering Committee
- Girls 4 Science, board member
- Chicago Southland Economic Development Corporation, trustee
- Illinois Democratic County Chairs Association Leadership Circle
- Delta Sigma Theta Sorority, Inc., member
- South Suburban Chicago Chapter of The Links, Incorporated, member

=== Electoral history ===
2020 Illinois State Senate (District 40) - Democratic Primary
Party	Candidate	Votes	%
Democratic	Patrick Joyce	11,387	46.7%
Democratic	Lori Wilcox	6,474	26.6%
Democratic	Monica Gordon	4,811	19.7%
Democratic	Marta Perales	1,692	6.9%

2022 Cook County Commissioner (District 5) - Democratic Primary
Party	Candidate	Votes	%
Democratic	Monica Gordon	10,465	35.5%
Democratic	Kierra Williams	7,533	25.6%
Democratic	Jaylin McClinton	5,739	19.5%
Democratic	Vernard Alsberry	5,712	19.4%

2022 Cook County Commissioner (District 5) - General Election
Party	Candidate	Votes	%
Democratic	Monica Gordon	63,385	91.3%
Libertarian	Jason Decker	6,005	8.7%

2024 Cook County Clerk - Special Election
Party	Candidate	Votes	%
Democratic	Monica Gordon	1,320,946	68.3%
Republican	Michelle Pennington	530,680	27.4%
Libertarian	Christopher Laurent	82,526	4.3%

2026 Cook County Clerk - Democratic Primary
Party	Candidate	Votes	%
Democratic	Monica Gordon	274,864	100%

=== Honors and awards ===
Among Gordon's honors and awards are:

- CCBLA Champion Award, Cook County Land Bank Authority (2026)
- Governors State University Distinguished Alumni (2026)
- Excellence in Bleu Women in Power Award (2026)
- Harvard Kennedy School Women and Power Fellow (2026)
- Chicago Southland Dr. Martin Luther King Jr. Activist Award (2026)
- Coretta Scott King Service Award, South Suburban College Foundation (2025)
- Moving the Needle Award (2025)
- Spirit of Excellence Rising Star Award (2025)
- GlobalMixx Game Changer Award (2025)
- Women's History Month Trailblazer Award, Genesis Music & Arts (2025)
- Executive Leadership Council Leadership Development Fellow (2025)
- One AIM Illinois Outstanding Leadership Award (2024)
- Crescent Moon Award, Phi Beta Sigma Fraternity, Inc., Epsilon Sigma Chapter (2024)
- Community Service Impact Award, Markham Public Library (2024)
- Committeeperson of the Year, Southland Chamber of Commerce (2023)
- President Joseph R. Biden Lifetime Achievement Award (2023)
- Edgar Fellow, University of Illinois Institute of Government and Public Affairs (2023)
- Chicago Defender Women of Excellence Award (2022)
- College Board Member of the Year, Southland Chamber of Commerce (2021, 2022)
- Illinois Women's Institute for Leadership Training Academy (2021)

Awards received by the Clerk's Office during Gordon's tenure include:

- National Association of Counties (NACo) Innovation Award (2026)
- National Clearinghouse Award, U.S. Election Assistance Commission (2025)
- National Association of Counties (NACo) Achievement Award (2025)

=== Personal life ===
Gordon is a longtime resident of Chicago's Southland region. She has frequently cited being born on Labor Day as symbolic of her commitment to public service and working families.
