= Precious Brady-Davis =

American author and activist (born 1985)

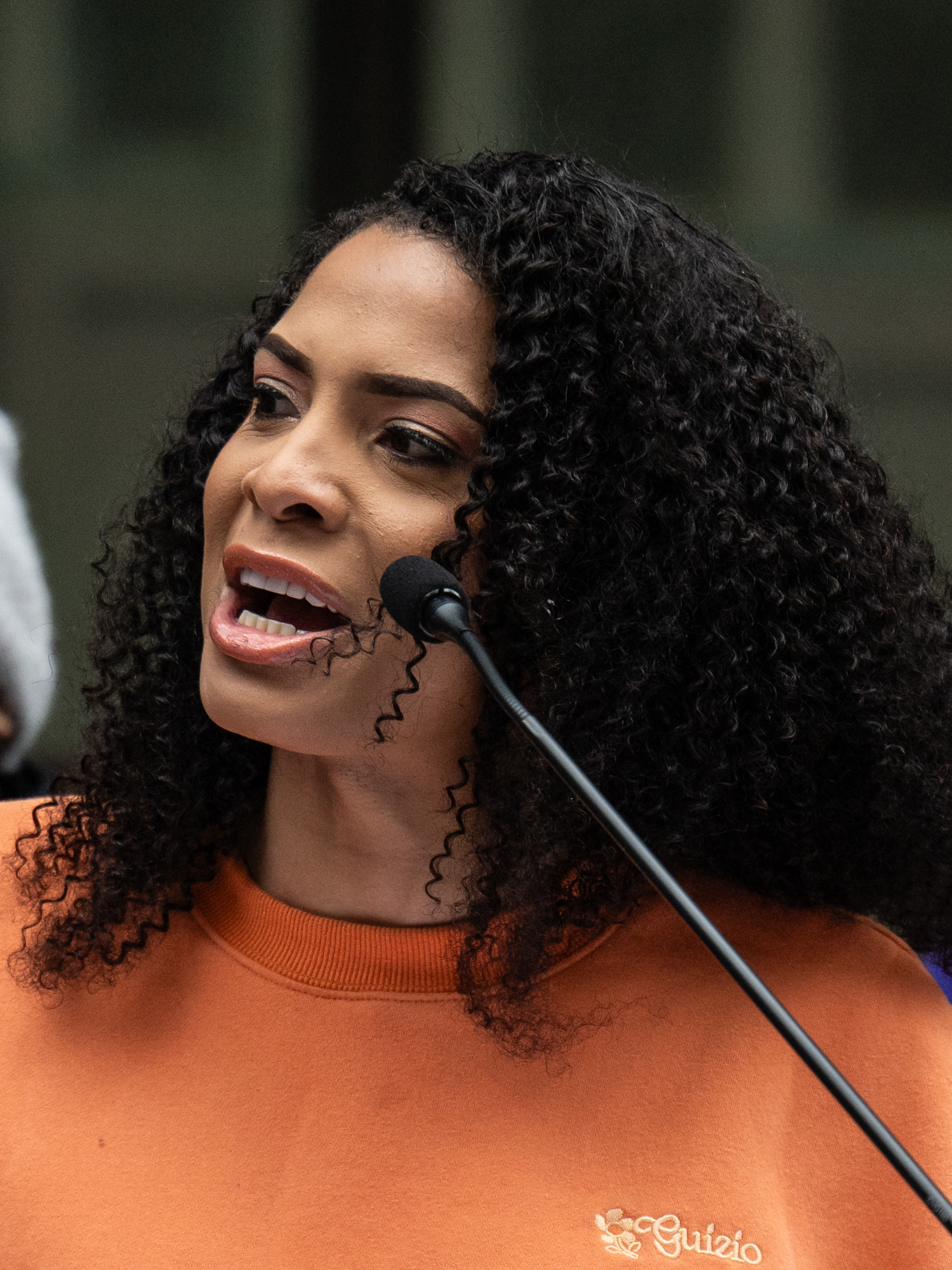
- Brady-Davis in 2025

Member of the Metropolitan Water Reclamation District of Greater Chicago Board of Commissioners
- Incumbent
- Assumed office July 12, 2023
- Preceded by: Kimberly du Buclet

Personal details
- Born: 1985 (age 40–41) Omaha, Nebraska, U.S.
- Party: Democratic
- Education: University of Nebraska–Lincoln (attended); Columbia College Chicago (BA)

Precious Brady-Davis (born 1985) is an American politician. She is commissioner at the Metropolitan Water Reclamation District of Greater Chicago (MWRD), a Chief Strategy Officer at the Center on Halsted, a transgender author, and a climate change and LGBT rights activist. She wrote the best-selling book I Have Always Been Me.

== Biography ==
Brady-Davis was born in Omaha, Nebraska, and was in foster care as a toddler. At age five, she moved in with her grandfather and his wife. In high school, she started to explore her identity.

Brady-Davis attended the University of Nebraska–Lincoln. While living in Lincoln, Nebraska, she began performing drag using the name "Precious Jewel". She later transferred to Columbia College Chicago. While in Chicago, she came out as gay. Living in Boystown, she made a name for herself as a performance artist. She launched a US$1.6 million dollar CDC HIV Prevention program at Chicago's Center on Halsted, an LGBT community center. There, she was also a mentor of LGBT teens.

Brady-Davis has served as northeast communications director for the Sierra Club.

She and her husband Myles Brady-Davis had a baby girl in 2019. They became the first transgender couple to have their gender identities listed correctly on an Illinois birth certificate. They live in Hyde Park. She currently works as a Chief Strategy Officer at the Center on Halsted and is on the Board of Commissioners at the Metropolitan Water Reclamation District of Greater Chicago. She is also a nationally known speaker and activist.

In July 2023, she became the first black trans woman to be appointed to a commissioner position at the Metropolitan Water Reclamation District of Greater Chicago.

== Publications ==
Brady-Davis' memoir I Have Always Been Me was a best-selling biography on Amazon.

== Filmography ==
Brady-Davis was a consulting producer for The Lady and the Dale. She was also featured on TLC's My Pregnant Husband. Additionally, she appeared on Say Yes to the Dress: Atlanta on Season 9, Episode 5 "Are You Ready to Play Bridal Blitz?".
