= Cook County Board of Commissioners 9th district =

- District
- District 9
- Current Board of Commissioners map, 9th district highlighted in red
- Country: United States
- State: Illinois
- County: Cook
- Townships and equivalent jurisdictions: list: Chicago; Leyden Township; Maine Township; Norwood Park Township; River Forest Township

Government
  - Type: District
  - Body: Cook County Board of Commissioners
  - Commissioner: Maggie Trevor (D)

Cook County Board of Commissioners 9th district is a single-member electoral district for the Cook County Board of Commissioners. The district represents areas of suburban Cook County. It is currently represented by Maggie Tevor, a Democrat.

== History ==
The district was established in 1994, when the board transitioned from holding elections in individual districts, as opposed to the previous practice of having two multi-member districts: one for ten members from the city of Chicago and another for seven members from suburban Cook County.

== Geography ==
The district has, since its inception, covered portions of Chicago's Far Northwest Side and its northwest suburbs.

=== 1994 boundaries ===
When the district was first established, the district represented parts of the Northwest side of Chicago and the northern suburbs of Cook County, and the western suburbs of Cook County.

=== 2001 redistricting ===
New boundaries were adopted in August 2001, with redistricting taking place following the 2000 United States census.

In regards to townships and equivalent jurisdictions, the district's redistricted boundaries included portions of the city of Chicago and portions of the Leyden, Maine, Norwood Park, Oak Park, and River Forest townships.

=== 2012 redistricting ===
The district currently, as redistricted in 2012 following the 2010 United States census, includes the Norwood Park and Dunning areas of Chicago as well as the suburbs of Arlington Heights, Des Plaines, Elmwood Park, Franklin Park, Glenview, Harwood Heights, Melrose Park, Morton Grove, Mount Prospect, Niles, Norridge, Park Ridge, Prospect Heights, River Forest, River Grove, Rosemont and Schiller Park.

In regards to townships and equivalent jurisdictions, it includes portions of the city of Chicago, and portions of Elk Grove, Leyden, Maine, Northfield, Norwood Park, River Forest, and Wheeling townships, as well as a small, uninhabited portion of Proviso.

The district is 59.54 square miles (38,103.37 acres).

=== 2022 redistricting ===
The district was redistricted following the 2020 United States census. Its redistricting was seen as having made the district's voter demography more Republican-leaning than it had previously been. The overall boundaries of the district are similar to the previous ones, containing portions of the cities of Chicago, River Forest, Elmwood Park, River Grove, Rosemont, Harwood Heights, Norridge, Park Ridge, Niles, Glenview, Des Plaines, Mount Prospect, Arlington Heights, Prospect Heights, Rolling Meadows, and an unpopulated portion of Melrose Park.

== Politics ==
The district was represented by Republican commissioner Peter N. Silvestri until his retirement in 2022. At that time, it was won by Democrat Maggie Trevor.

At its inception, the district was originally projected to be a "swing district", with both major parties having a fair chance of winning the district.

== List of commissioners representing the district ==
Commissioner	Party	Years	Electoral history
Peter N. Silvestri	Republican	December 1994–December 2022	Elected in 1994, 1998, 2002, 2006, 2010, 2014, 2018
Maggie Trevor	Democratic	December 2022–present	Elected in 2022

== Election results ==
Cook County Board of Commissioners 9th district general elections
Year	Winning candidate	Party	Vote (pct)	Opponent	Party	Vote (pct)	Opponent	Party	Vote (pct)
1994	Peter N. Silvestri	Republican		Marco Domico	Democratic				
1998	Peter N. Silvestri	Republican	47,720 (55.76%)	Joan A. Sullivan	Democratic	37,854 (44.24%)			
2002	Peter N. Silvestri	Republican	50,343 (53.67%)	Robert Martwick	Democratic	43,452 (46.33%)			
2006	Peter N. Silvestri	Republican	47,881 (56.61%)	Jodi L. Biancalana	Democratic	36,701 (43.39%)			
2010	Peter N. Silvestri	Republican	47,333 (55.29%)	Cary Capparelli	Democratic	31,186 (36.43%)	Brock Merck	Green	7,084 (8.28%)
2014	Peter N. Silvestri	Republican	51,290 (63.06%)	Frank L. McPartlin	Democratic	30,040 (36.94%)			
2018	Peter N. Silvestri	Republican	55,612 (52.24%)	Frank L. McPartlin	Democratic	50,839 (47.76%)			
2022	Maggie Trevor	Democratic	53,531 (50.32%)	Matt Podgorski	Republican	52,851 (49.68%)			
