= Eisenhower Public Library District =

Public library in the United States

Coordinates: 41°57′50.30″N 87°48′42″W

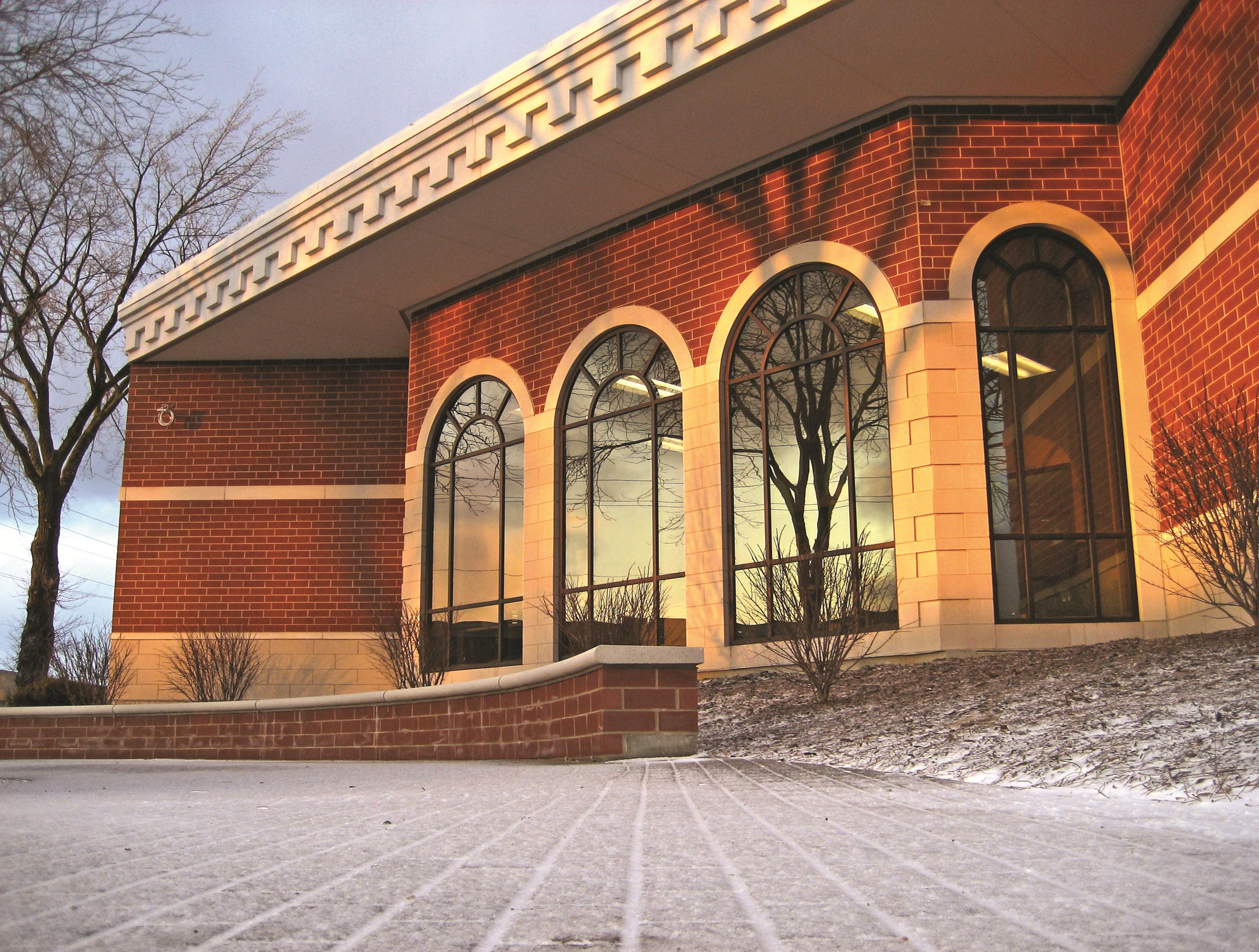
- Location: Harwood Heights, Illinois
- Established: 1972

Access and use
- Circulation: 424,620 (2015)
- Members: 14,673

Other information
- Director: Ms. Stacy Wittmann
- Employees: 63
- Website: EisenhowerLibrary.org

The Eisenhower Public Library District is a public library located in Harwood Heights, Illinois, one of two suburbs completely surrounded by but not incorporated into Chicago.

The Eisenhower Public Library District serves Harwood Heights and Norridge residents. Its mission is to "[empower] patrons of all ages to be successful and informed members of their communities."

== History ==
pre-1972 – Chicago provided free library services for Norridge and Harwood Heights residents until January 1972.

1972 – The library was created with federal funds, named by local school children. Located in the basement of the Parkway Towers apartment complex on Harlem Avenue, the library was supplemented by a bookmobile, which made weekly stops at local schools, churches, businesses, and the village halls. The bookmobile held about 3,500 volumes.

1973 – Residents voted in support of a referendum for a library district, to be supported by property tax revenue (still the main source of library income). The state library provided funds to match the grant that initially came from the federal Project Plus program.

1974 – October: The library moved to the CANTOS sheet-metal factory at 4652 N. Olcott Avenue. The Polish language collection was established.

1975 – Computers were first used to check out materials.

1976 – The bookmobile stopped running.

1982 – The library building was expanded and remodeled – from 7500 square feet to 11,250 square feet.

1984 – February: A computerized card catalog was added – the library became the 8th in the state of Illinois to offer this service.

1997 – A referendum for refurbishment or a new facility failed to pass.

1998 – A revised referendum for refurbishment or a new facility failed to pass.

2003 – April: A referendum for a new facility passed.

2008 – January: New LEED Silver-certified building at 4613 N. Oketo Avenue was completed, encompassing 44,576 square feet. The new building features a dedicated children's department called Kids World, a Quiet Room with a fireplace, study rooms, a computer lab, an independently run cafe, and a display room for local history materials.

1972–2011 – The library, since inception, was a member of the Metropolitan Library System (formerly the Suburban Library System), a group of libraries made up of public, academic, special, high school and grade school libraries in the near south and west Chicago-area suburbs. This system, along with most others in Illinois, apart from the Chicago Public Library System, was incorporated into a statewide system called the Reaching Across Illinois Library System (RAILS) in July, 2011.

September 19, 2025 - Board President Mark Braun resigns due to Facebook comments regarding the assassination of Charlie Kirk.

== Gallery ==
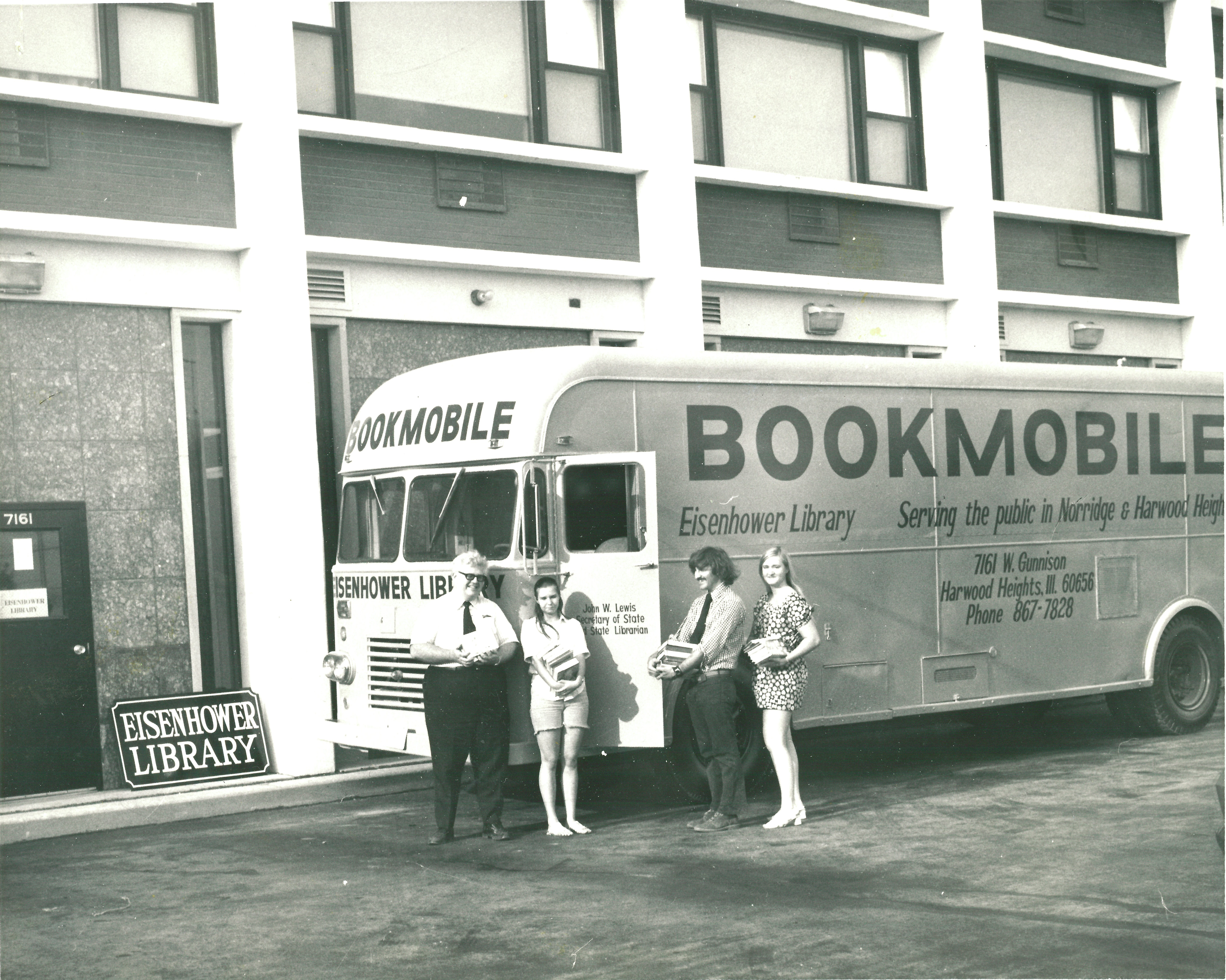
Library employees with bookmobile, outside of Parkway Towers

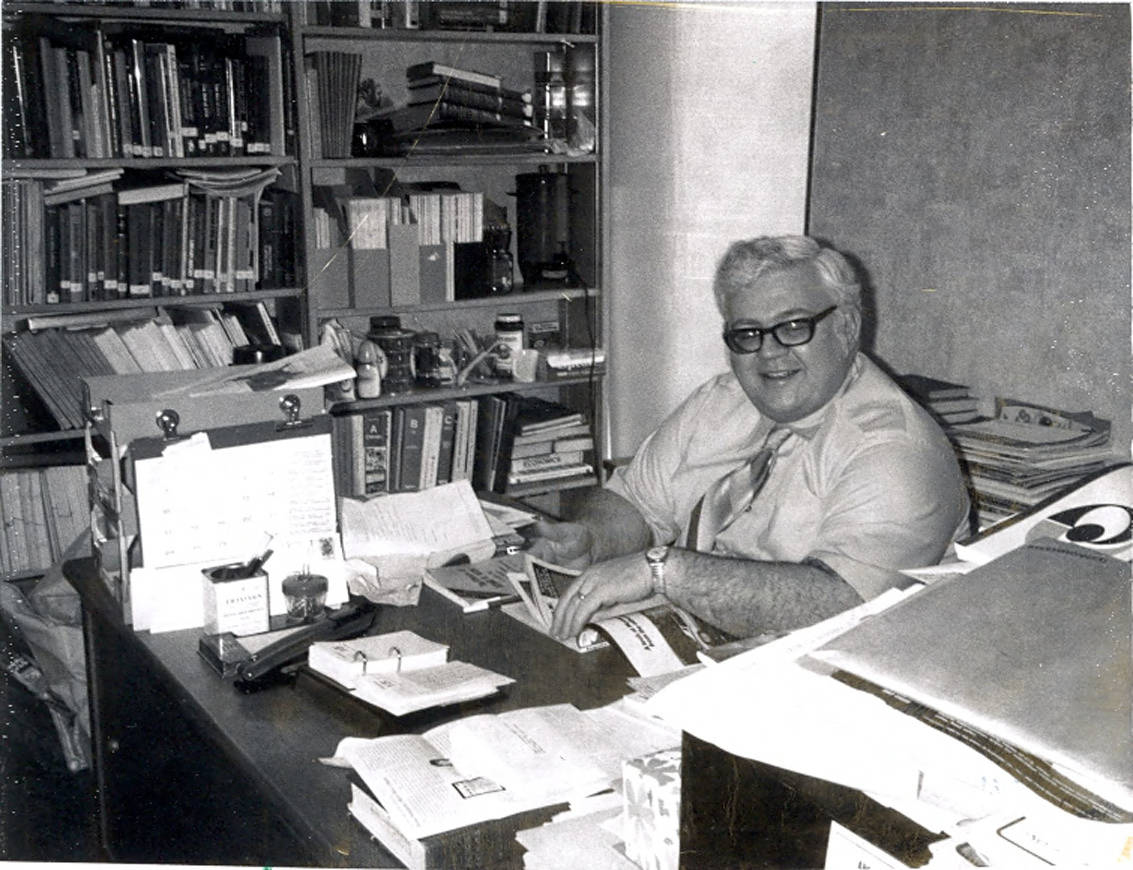
First library director, Fred Donnelly, 1974

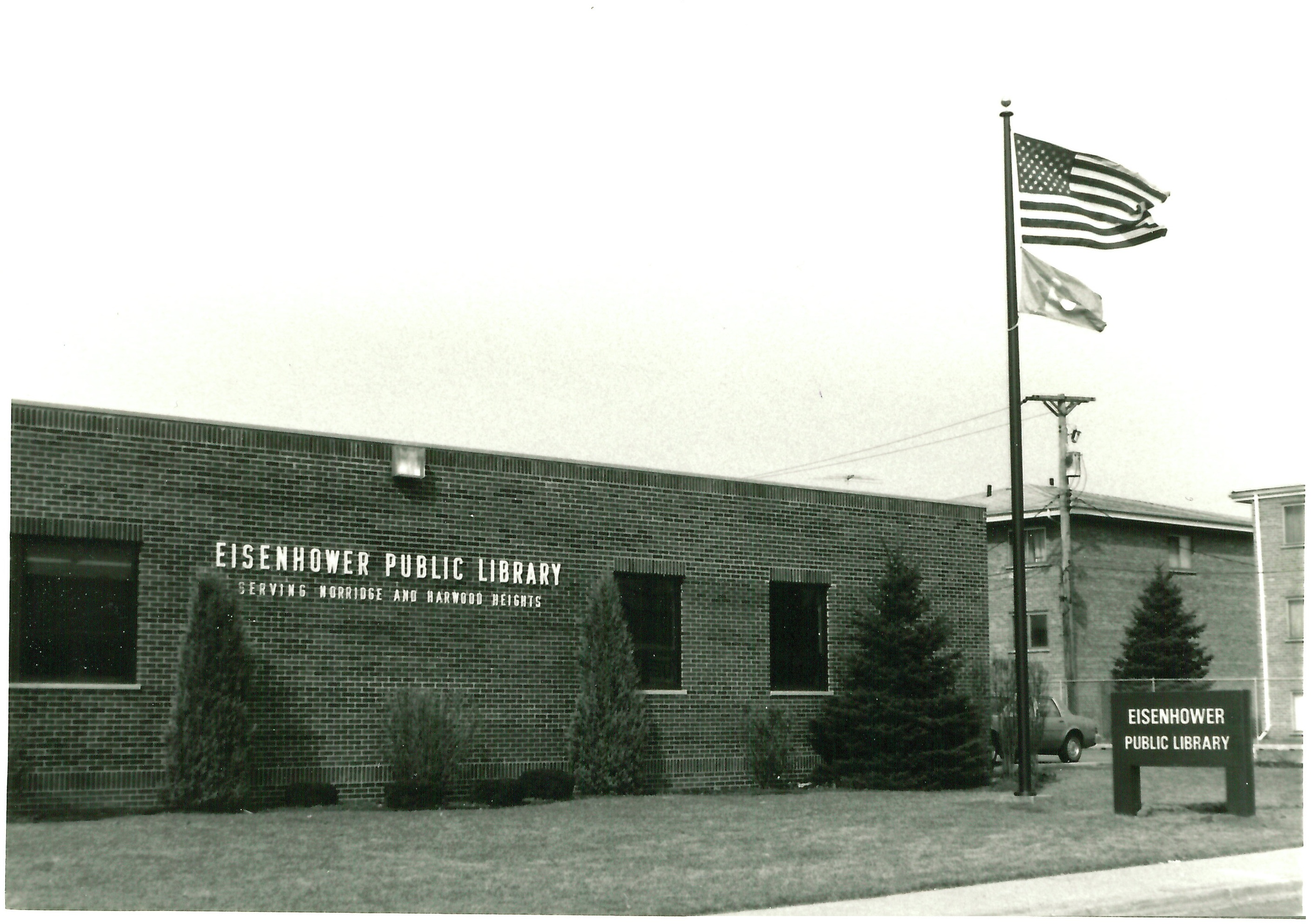
Eisenhower Library's Olcott location

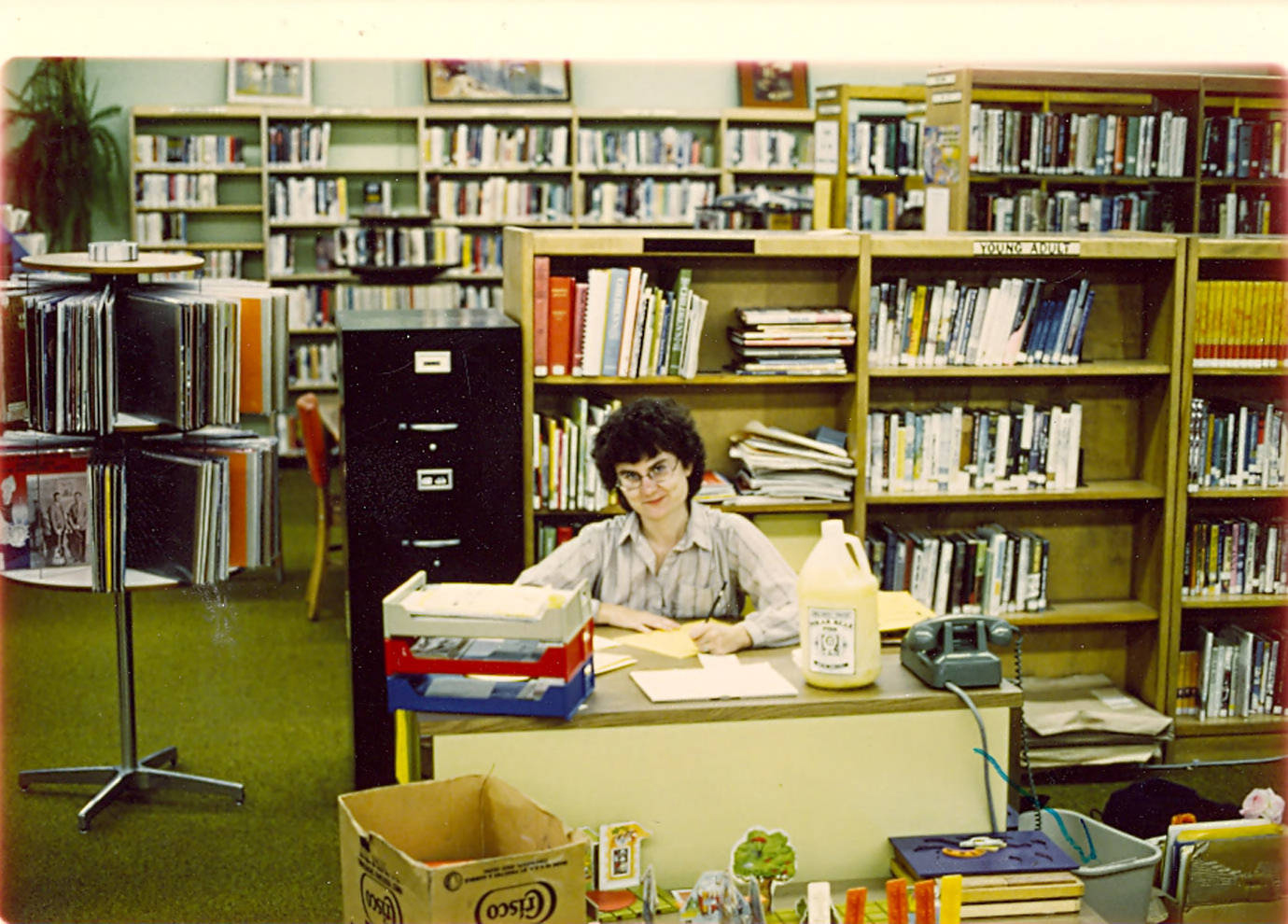
Librarian Jan Jones works the desk at Olcott location.

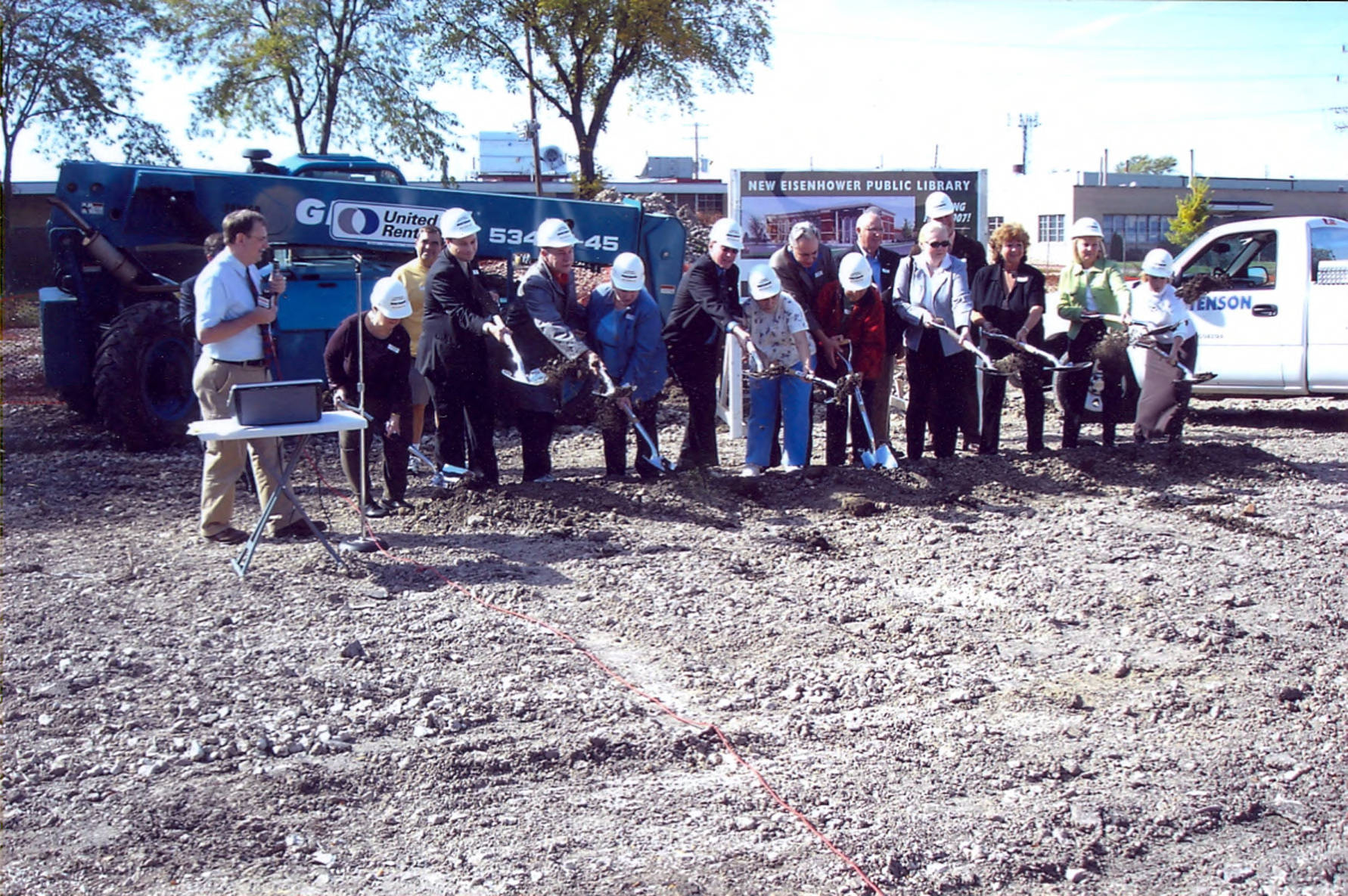
Ground-breaking ceremony for Oketo location

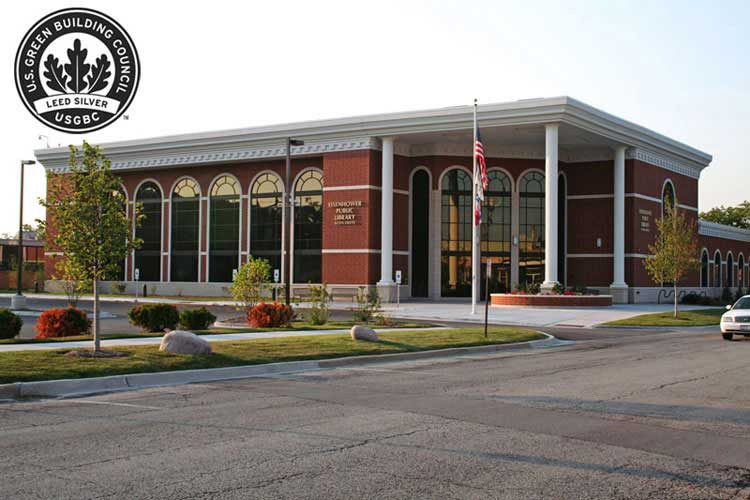
Eisenhower Public Library District, LEED Silver certified

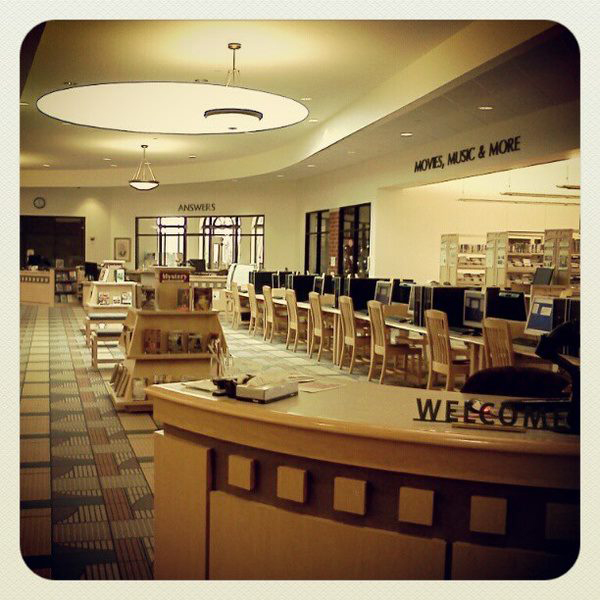
Eisenhower Public Library, view from Welcome Desk

== Services ==
=== Library Services ===
Residents and reciprocal borrowers who have a library card from anywhere else in Illinois can get a library card at the Library Services desk.

=== Kids World ===
This department offers materials (including textbooks for local schools), craft activities, educational and entertainment events, serving ages 0 through 5th grade. Four age levels of Storytime programs, in English and Polish, are offered regularly.

=== Teen ===
The library has a collection and study area specifically for teens. Special collections here include: local schools' summer reading books, Abraham Lincoln (and other award) winners, and books associated with a teen author panel program called Litworks, which is coordinated by the library and Ridgewood High School.

=== Programs ===
The library offers many programs for adults and children – patrons can sign up by phone, in person, or online. Most events are free; some may have small tasting or supplies fees. The bus trips have higher fees. The library hosts 5 book clubs, 2 writing groups, a knitting circle, and allows its 2 meeting rooms to be reserved by assorted non-profit organizations, as well. The library also offers computer classes for beginners, including introduction to computers, using a keyboard and mouse, using the internet, email, and various special topic classes, like saving and transferring documents, using online image editors, digital cameras, e-readers, the library catalog, and more.

==== Bus Trips ====
The library arranges approximately one bus trip per month to assorted nearby locations and events: museum exhibits, tours, seasonal markets, plays, and more. Bus trips usually last approximately 6 hours, including travel time, generally cost $20, and may include a lunch. Non-residents may also sign up. There tend to be about 20 spaces per trip.

==== Libros Lege ====
For 4 years (2008–2011), the library participated in an exchange program with the Warsaw Public Library, built around an English-language fluency/Polish literature appreciation contest called "Libros Lege". In both Warsaw and Harwood Heightd, participants were invited to select a passage from a book by a Polish-heritage author, written in or translated into English, and present it in a short speech. 5 contestants were selected from each country and were sent on a 9-day, all-expense-paid trip to Warsaw and the Masovia province (American winners) or Harwood Heights/Chicago (Polish winners).

=== Electronic Resources ===
In addition to computers with Microsoft Office software, free Wi-Fi, and a number of databases, downloadable music, ebooks, and audiobooks available to borrow from home, the library also has 47 Nook e-readers that can be checked out by residents. The online catalog is available on computers throughout the building and through the library's website and a mobile app (currently only for Android devices).

== Board of trustees ==
The current Board of the library consists of:

- Peter Magnelli – Vice President (appointed 2009, elected member since 2011)
- Janice Magnuson – Secretary (member since 2011)
- Elizabeth Ringelstein – Treasurer (appointed 2016, elected member since 2017)
- Gary R. Ross – Trustee (member 1974–2013, former vice president, elected again since 2017)
- Scott Parent – Trustee (appointed 2018)
- Mary Krebs - Trustee (appointed 2021)

Past board members:
Ruth Igoe – Secretary (15 years), President (14 years) (1974–2005); Catherine V. "Kay" Kupczyk – Trustee, President (1980–2010); Susan Bilek – Trustee (appointed 2010–2011); Mark Kurzatkowski – Trustee (2013–2017); Gail J. Burkhart – Vice President (1998–2016); Natalie K. Rothbart – Treasurer (1974–2018); Tom Sticha – Treasurer (2011-2019) Jennifer Adams - Trustee (2019-2021) Mark Braun (x-2025)
