= Robert Martwick =

American politician

Rob Martwick
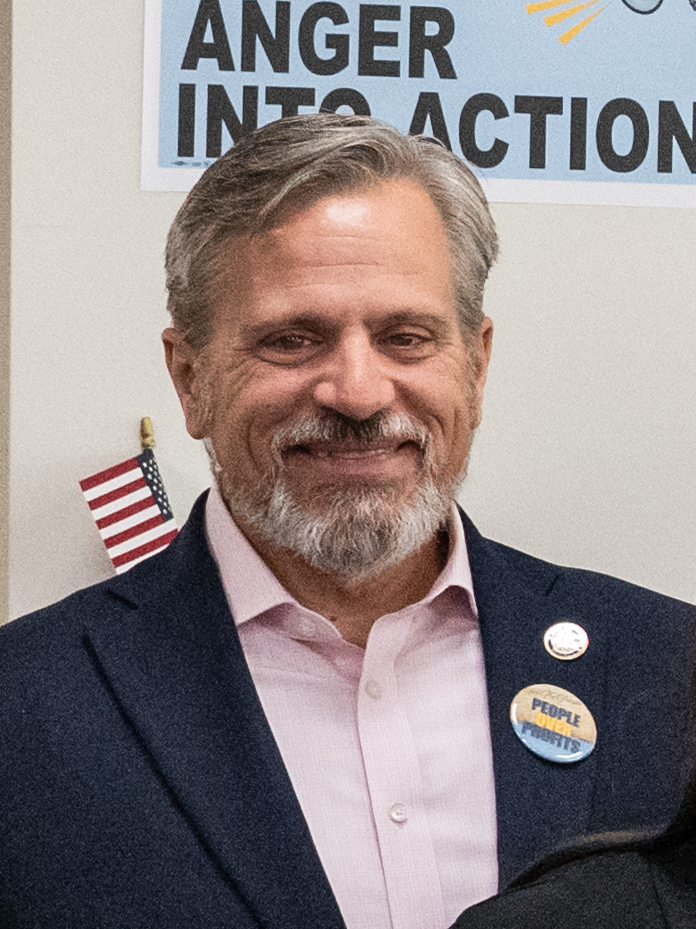
- Martwick in 2025

Member of the Illinois Senate from the 10th district
- Incumbent
- Assumed office June 28, 2019
- Preceded by: John Mulroe

Member of the Illinois House of Representatives from the 19th district
- In office January 9, 2013 – June 28, 2019
- Preceded by: Joseph M. Lyons
- Succeeded by: Lindsey LaPointe

Personal details
- Born: February 28, 1966 (age 60)
- Party: Democratic
- Education: Boston College (BA); John Marshall Law School (JD)

Robert F. Martwick Jr. is a Democratic member of the Illinois Senate, representing the 10th District since June 28, 2019. The district, includes Chicago’s northwest side and some of its surrounding suburbs. Prior to his appointment to the Illinois Senate, he served in the Illinois House of Representatives from the 19th district.

In 2017, Martwick became the Democratic Committeeman for Chicago's 38th ward.

== Early life ==
Robert F. Martwick Jr. is descended from a civically active Polish American family traditionally associated with Chicago Polonia. His father was the Democratic Committeeman for Norwood Park Township and his uncle Richard J. Martwick served as Cook County Regional Superintendent of Education from 1970 until 1994.

Martwick earned a Bachelor of Arts from Boston College in 1988, and went on to receive a Juris Doctor from John Marshall Law School in 1996. Martwick began his legal career as an Assistant State's Attorney in the Cook County State's Attorney's Office.

== Early political career ==
Martwick was elected a Township Trustee for Norwood Park Township in 1993.

In 1996, he narrowly lost a race against Republican Senator Walter Dudycz, who at that time was Deputy Majority Leader, by less than 1% in 1996. During the 1996 campaign, Martwick was endorsed by the Chicago Tribune.

Martwick went on to run for Trustee of the Village of Norridge in 1999 at the behest of Mayor Earl Field. Martwick was reelected in 2003 and 2007 before retiring after his third term.

In 2002, Martwick unsuccessfully challenged Republican incumbent Peter N. Silvestri for Cook County Commissioner in the 9th district.

== Illinois General Assembly ==
After incumbent Representative Joseph M. Lyons announced he would not seek another term in September 2011, Martwick announced his intent to run for the open seat in the newly drawn 19th district. The 19th district includes parts of the Dunning, Gladstone Park, Jefferson Park, and Portage Park neighborhoods, in addition to portions of the suburbs of Elmwood Park, Harwood Heights, Norridge, and River Grove. He was elected in the 2012 general election.

On June 28, 2019, Martwick was appointed to the Illinois Senate. The Senate district includes the territory he had represented in the state house, as well as the Edison Park and O'Hare community areas of Chicago and all or parts of the suburbs of Park Ridge, Schiller Park, Franklin Park and Norridge. His house district included much of the eastern portion of his senate district; Illinois state senate districts are formed by combining two neighboring house districts.

In the House, Martwick was Chairperson of the Personnel & Pensions Committee. He is also assigned to the following committees: Elementary and Secondary Education: School Curric Policies; Revenue & Finance; and Transportation: Regulation, Roads.

As of July 2022, Senator Martwick was a member of the following Illinois Senate committees:

- Appropriations - Personnel and Procurement Committee (SAPP-SAPP)
- Appropriations Judiciary Committee (SAPP-SAJU)
- Criminal Law Committee (SCCL)
- Criminal Law - Juvenile Court Committee (SCJC)
- Education Committee (SCCL-SCJC)
- Environment and Conservation Committee (SNVR)
- Judiciary Committee (SJUD)
- Judiciary - Property Law Committee (SJUD-DJPL)
- Judiciary - Torts Committee (SJUD-SJTO)
- (Chairman of) Pensions Committee (SPEN)
- Problem-Solving Courts Committee (SCCL-SCPS)
- Redistricting - Chicago Northwest Committee (SRED-SRNW)
- Revenue Committee (SREV)

=== Advocacy for elected Chicago school board ===
Matwick is a staunch proponent of an elected school board for Chicago Public Schools. Martwick has proposed bills for an elected Chicago school board during the previous two General Assemblies.

In the 99th General Assembly, Martwick was the chief sponsor of HB557. HB 557 would subdivide the City of Chicago into 20 electoral districts by the Illinois General Assembly for seats on the Chicago Board of Education. The bill passed the House 110-4 in March 2016, but stalled in the Illinois Senate. During the 100th General Assembly, Martwick proposed House Bill 1774 which would provide for the election of the Chicago Board of Education starting with the 2019 consolidated election. The board would have had a single member elected citywide and twenty members elected from districts drawn by the state legislature. The bill passed the Illinois House of Representatives 105-9. A similar bill passed the Illinois Senate, but the two bills failed to be reconciled before the end of the legislative session.

=== Firearm regulation legislation ===
As a freshman legislator, Martwick introduced House Bill 5318 that became an important part of the Illinois’s concealed carry legislation.

Martwick's provision created an "automatic objection" to the application for a conceal and carry permit made by persons who had been arrested 5 or more times in the previous 7 years (for any reason) and by persons who had been arrested 3 or more times in the previous 7 years for gang related activity. Any person whose application has been objected to must appear before a 7 panel license review committee which holds a hearing and decides whether to grant the license to the applicant. This automatic objection process helped make Illinois' concealed carry law into a "hybrid" shall issue/may issue law, providing for a tool to deny licenses to people who repeatedly run afoul of the law, while at the same time ensuring that law abiding citizens would not have their rights infringed upon. Martwick's provision was widely backed by both concealed carry advocates and gun control advocates, and it received more votes than any other provision in the concealed carry legislation. Shortly after it became law, a known gang leader was denied a concealed carry permit due to this provision.

=== Proposal to make Cook County Assessor an appointed position ===
In early 2019, Martwick introduced legislation that would make the position of Cook County Assessor an appointed position, rather than an elected one (as it currently is). On February 18, 2019, Lori Lightfoot (then a candidate in the 2019 Chicago mayoral election, which she would later go on to win), held a press conference in which she criticized this. Martwick attended this press conference, and got into a heated impromptu debate with Lightfoot, which generated headlines.
