= District 86 =

District 86 may refer to:

- Hinsdale Township High School District 86
- Union Ridge School District 86
- East Peoria Elementary School District 86
- Joliet Public Schools District 86
