= William Langford (golf) =

Golf course designer and civil engineer

William Boice Langford (1887–1977) was a golf course designer and civil engineer from Austin, Illinois. He graduated from both Yale and Columbia University. During the golden age of golf design between the world wars, he produced many great golf courses primarily in the Midwest states. Langford’s work is reminiscent of golf course designers Seth Raynor, Charles Banks and Charles B. Macdonald. He died in Sarasota, Florida in 1977.

Along with Theodore Moreau, he produced over 200 golf courses. Some of the best include Minnehaha Country Club, in Sioux Falls, South Dakota, added in 2018 as a tournament stop for the PGA Champions tour, Martin County Golf Course in Stuart, Florida, Milburn Country Club in Overland Park, Kansas, Wakonda in Des Moines, Iowa, Harrison Hills in Attica, Indiana, Maxinkuckee in Culver, Indiana (played often by Roy, Pete and Alice Dye early in their careers), Ozaukee in Mequon, Wisconsin, Lawsonia in Green Lake, Wisconsin, and Happy Hollow in Omaha, Nebraska.

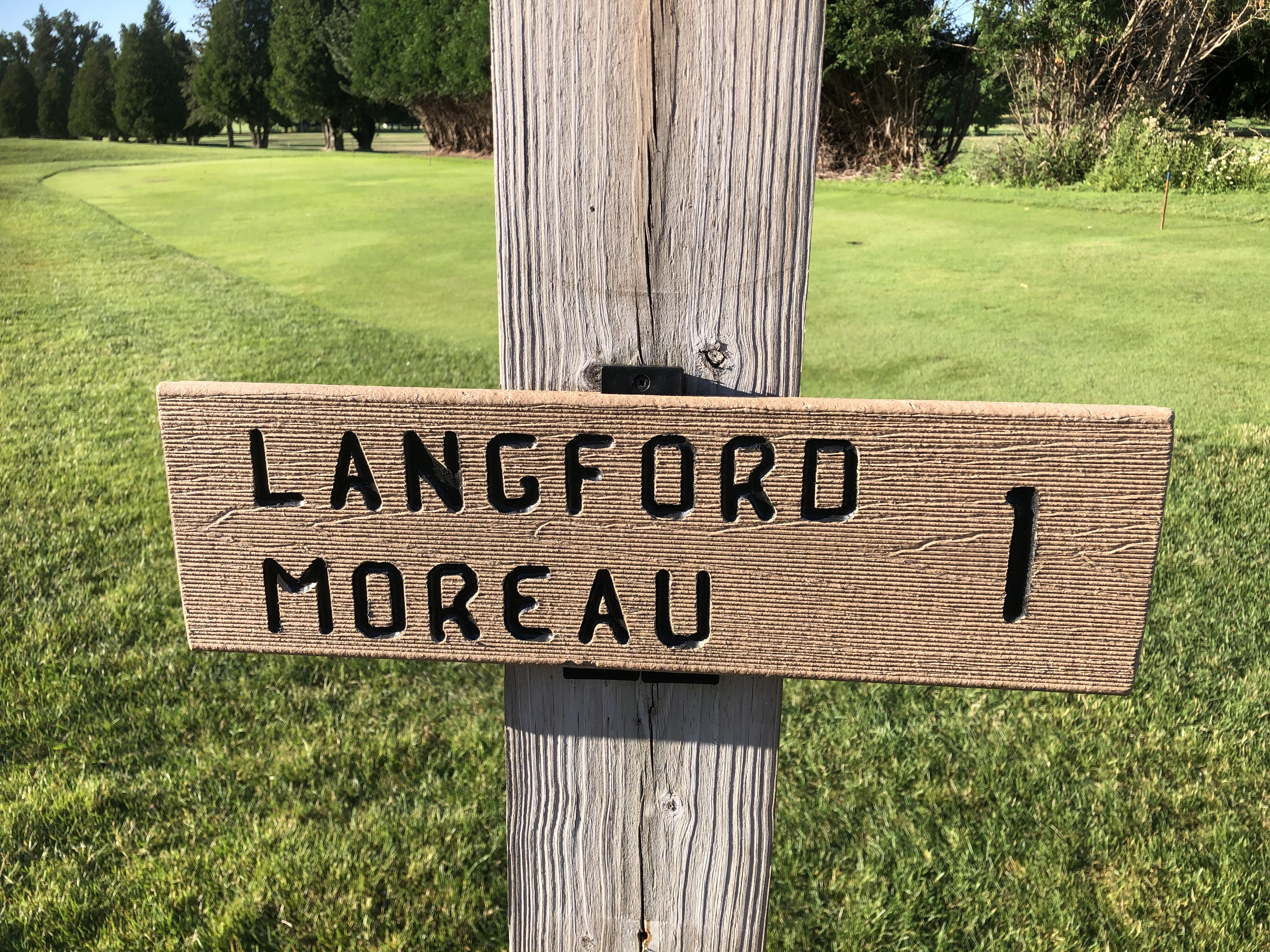
1st tee Marquette Golf Course

== Courses Designed ==
The following is a (partial) list of other courses designed or remodeled by William Langford:

- Arkansas
  - Texarkana CC (1927) - Texarkana, AR
- Florida
  - Key West GC (1923) - Key West, FL
  - Martin County GC (1920) - Stuart, FL
  - Eglin Eagle Course (1927) - Niceville, FL
- Illinois
  - Acacia CC (1917) - Indian Head Park, IL
  - Barrington Hills CC (1946) - Barrington, IL
  - Bloomington CC (1917) - Bloomington, IL
  - Bryn Mawr GC (1921) - Lincolnwood, IL
  - Butterfield CC (1922) - Oak Brook, IL
  - Franklin County CC (back 9) (1921)(West Frankfort, IL)
  - Glen Oak CC (1922) - Glen Ellyn, IL
  - Kankakee Elks Club (1926) - Saint Anne, IL
  - La Grange CC (1924) - La Grange, IL
  - Marquette Park GC (1917) - Chicago, IL
  - Park Ridge CC (1949) - Park Ridge, IL
  - Ridgemoor Country Club (1905) - Harwood Heights, IL
  - Riverside Golf Club (1917) - North Riverside, IL
  - Ruth Lake CC (1926) - Hinsdale, IL
  - Schaumburg CC (1928) - Schaumburg, IL
  - St. Clair Country Club (1911) - Belleville, IL
  - Winnetka GC (1917) - Winnetka, IL
- Indiana
  - Innsbrook CC (1919) - Merrillville, IN
  - Christiana Creek CC (1925 and 1945) - Elkhart, IN
  - Culver Military Academy (1920) - Culver, IN
  - Harrison Hills Country Club (1924) - Attica, IN (9 holes)
  - Oakland City GC (1946) - Oakland City, IN
  - Maxwelton GC (1929) - Syracuse, IN
  - Fort Wayne CC (1916) - Fort Wayne, IN (9 holes)
- Iowa
  - Ellis Park Muni (1949) - Cedar Rapids, IA
  - Keokuk CC (1951) - Keokuk, IA
  - Oneota CC (1921) - Decorah, IA
  - Wakonda CC (1922) - Des Moines, IA
- Kansas
  - Brookridge Country Club (1960) - Overland Park, KS
  - Milburn G&CC (1917) - Overland Park, KS
- Kentucky
  - Audubon CC (1921) - Louisville, KY
  - Indian Hills CC (1956) - Bowling Green, KY
  - Louisville CC (1921) - Louisville, KY
- Michigan
  - Blythefield CC (1927) - Belmont, MI
  - Country Club of Lansing (1919) - Lansing, MI
  - Marquette G&CC (1927) - Marquette, MI
- Minnesota
  - Mankato GC (1954) - Mankato, MN
- Mississippi
  - Clarksdale CC (1921) - Clarksdale, MS
- Nebraska
  - Highland CC (1924) - Omaha, NE
  - Happy Hollow Club (1924) - Omaha, NE
- South Dakota
  - Minnehaha Country Club (1922) - Sioux Falls, SD
- Ohio
  - Clovernook Country Club (1921) - Cincinnati, OH
  - Fairlawn Country Club (1918) - Akron, OH
  - Portage Path Country Club (1918) - Akron, OH
- Tennessee
  - Chickasaw CC (1922) - Memphis, TN
  - Colonial CC (1916) - Cordova, TN
  - Jackson Country Club (1914) - Jackson, TN
  - Gatlinburg G&CC (1956) - Pigeon Forge, TN
  - Green Meadow CC (1958) - Alcoa, TN
  - The Country Club (1959) - Morristown, TN
- Wisconsin
  - The Links at Lawsonia (1930) - Green Lake, WI
  - Ozaukee CC (1922) - Mequon, WI
  - Spring Valley CC (1927) - Salem, WI
  - West Bend CC (1922) - West Bend, WI

== Links ==
- http://thecaddyshack.blogspot.com/2007/06/architect-15-william-langford.html
- http://www.golfclubatlas.com/in-my-opinion/mark-chalfant-the-architecture-of-william-b-langford/
- https://webspace.yale.edu/Yale-golf-history/Eras/1895-1923/Langford.htm
