= Harry H. Nichols House =

Historic house in Illinois, United States

- U.S. National Register of Historic Places
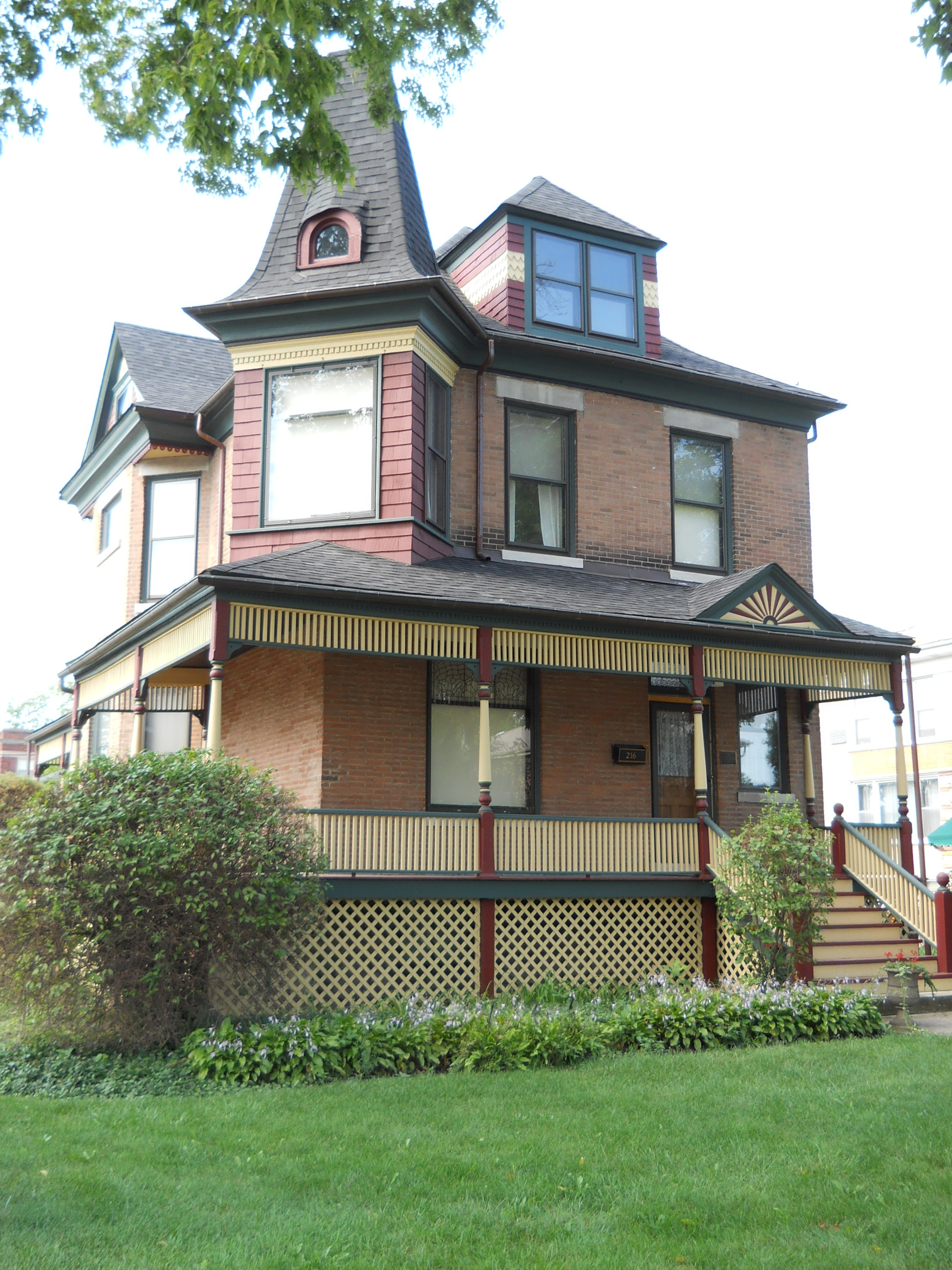

- Location within Chicago metropolitan area Location within Illinois Location within the United States
- Location: 216 S. 4th Ave., Maywood, Illinois
- Coordinates: 41°53′08″N 87°50′17″W
- Area: less than one acre
- Built: 1894
- Architectural style: Queen Anne
- MPS: Maywood MPS
- NRHP reference No.: 92000045
- Added to NRHP: February 24, 1992

The Harry H. Nichols House is a historic house at 216 S. 4th Avenue in Maywood, Illinois. The house was built in 1894 for Harry H. Nichols, the former postmaster of Maywood and the son of village founder William T. Nichols. It was designed in the Queen Anne style, which was popular in the late nineteenth century; along with the Jacob Bohlander House, it is one of two large, formal Queen Anne homes in Maywood. The house's design includes a wraparound front porch with a balustrade, a gable with a sunburst design above the entrance, a projecting gabled bay on its south side, and a rectangular tower at its southeast corner. Neoclassical elements such as urns, columns, and cornices adorn its interior; these were most likely inspired by the architecture of the recent Columbian Exposition.

The house was added to the National Register of Historic Places on February 24, 1992.
