= Leyden Township, Illinois =

Leyden Township
- Township
- Flag logo

- Location in Cook County

- Cook County's location in Illinois
- Coordinates: 41°56′17″N 87°52′07″W
- Country: United States
- State: Illinois
- County: Cook
- Named for: Leyden

Government
  - Type: Township
  - Township Supervisor: Rocco D. Biscaglio

Area
  - Total: 19.92 sq mi (51.6 km^{2})
  - Land: 19.92 sq mi (51.6 km^{2})
  - Water: 0 sq mi (0 km^{2}) 0%
- Elevation: 643 ft (196 m)

Population (2020)
  - Total: 93,096
  - Density: 4,673/sq mi (1,804/km^{2})
- Time zone: UTC-6 (CST)
  - Summer (DST): UTC-5 (CDT)
- ZIP codes: 60018, 60068, 60131, 60164, 60171, 60176, 60656, 60706, 60707
- Area codes: 708/464, 847/224
- FIPS code: 17-031-43120
- Website: www.leydentownship.com

Leyden Township is one of 29 townships in Cook County, Illinois, United States. As of the 2020 census, its population was 93,096 and it contained 35,824 housing units.

== Geography ==
Leyden Township is located generally west of the northern part of the city of Chicago, a strip of which (a stretch of land connecting O'Hare International Airport to the main body of the city) bisects the township. According to the 2021 census gazetteer files, Leyden Township has a total area of 19.92 square miles (51.59 km^{2}), all land.

=== Cities, towns, villages ===
- Bensenville (east of Mt. Prospect Rd.)
- Elmwood Park
- Franklin Park
- Melrose Park (north of North Av.)
- Norridge (west edge)
- Northlake (north of North Av.)
- Park Ridge (south edge)
- River Grove
- Rosemont (southeast three-quarters)
- Schiller Park

=== Adjacent townships ===
- Maine Township (north)
- Norwood Park Township (northeast)
- Oak Park Township (southeast)
- River Forest Township (southeast)
- Proviso Township (south)
- York Township, DuPage County (southwest)
- Addison Township, DuPage County (west)

=== Education ===
Leyden Township is home to Leyden High School District 212 which operates East and West Leyden High Schools and Elmwood Park Community Unit School District 401. 16 public elementary schools operate within the township.

Leyden also contains Triton Community College located in River Grove.

=== Cemeteries ===
The township contains these five cemeteries: Eden Memorial Park, Elmwood, Fairview Memorial, Memorial Estates and Saint Joseph.

=== Major highways ===
- Interstate 90
- Interstate 190
- Interstate 294
- U.S. Route 12
- U.S. Route 45
- Illinois Route 19
- Illinois Route 64
- Illinois Route 171

=== Landmarks ===
- O'Hare International Airport
- Cook County Forest Preserve (south quarter)

== Demographics ==
As of the 2020 census there were 93,096 people, 32,387 households, and 22,127 families residing in the township. The population density was 4,672.56 inhabitants per square mile (1,804.09/km^{2}). There were 35,824 housing units at an average density of 1,798.03 per square mile (694.22/km^{2}). The racial makeup of the township was 56.15% White, 2.52% African American, 1.54% Native American, 3.76% Asian, 0.03% Pacific Islander, 21.05% from other races, and 14.95% from two or more races. Hispanic or Latino of any race were 42.97% of the population.

There were 32,387 households, out of which 31.90% had children under the age of 18 living with them, 46.91% were married couples living together, 14.55% had a female householder with no spouse present, and 31.68% were non-families. 27.60% of all households were made up of individuals, and 11.00% had someone living alone who was 65 years of age or older. The average household size was 2.79 and the average family size was 3.44.

The township's age distribution consisted of 22.4% under the age of 18, 8.7% from 18 to 24, 27.8% from 25 to 44, 26.6% from 45 to 64, and 14.5% who were 65 years of age or older. The median age was 38.7 years. For every 100 females, there were 97.0 males. For every 100 females age 18 and over, there were 93.6 males.

The median income for a household in the township was $63,681, and the median income for a family was $78,411. Males had a median income of $42,950 versus $32,896 for females. The per capita income for the township was $28,718. About 8.8% of families and 10.5% of the population were below the poverty line, including 16.2% of those under age 18 and 7.9% of those age 65 or over.

Historical population
Census	Pop.	Note	%±
1960	81,814		—
1970	99,793		22.0%
1980	91,572		−8.2%
1990	89,142		−2.7%
2000	94,865		6.4%
2010	92,890		−2.1%
2020	93,906		1.1%
U.S. Decennial Census

== Political districts ==
- Illinois's 4th congressional district
- State House District 65
- State House District 77
- State Senate District 33
- State Senate District 39
