= Harwood Heights, Illinois =

Village in Cook County, Illinois, US

- Village
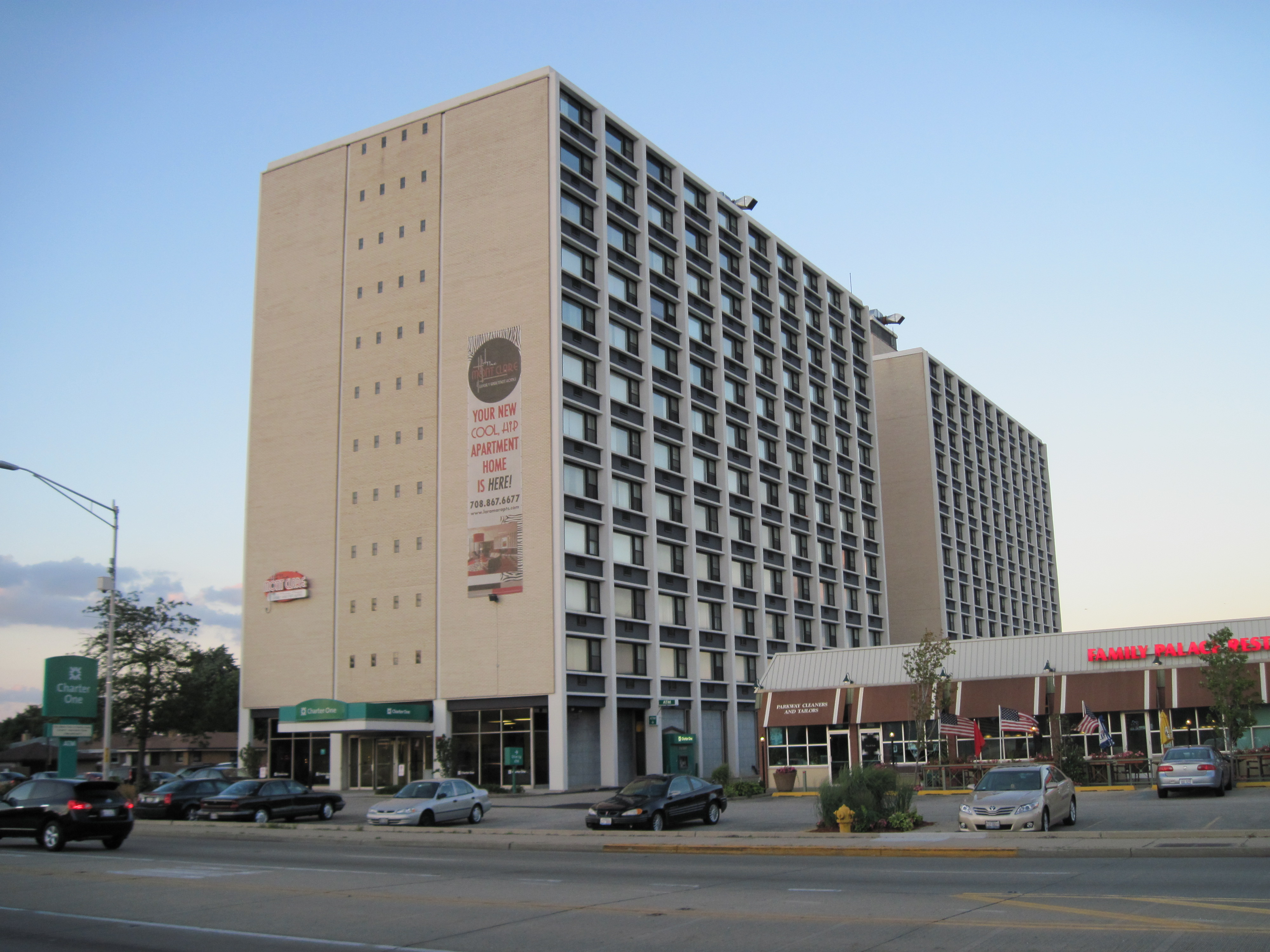
- The Mont Clare at Harlem Avenue, formerly known as Parkway Towers

- Seal
- Motto: A small town of big opportunities
- Location of Harwood Heights in Cook County, Illinois

- Location within Greater Chicago Location within Illinois Location within the United States
- Coordinates: 41°57′58″N 87°48′20″W
- Country: United States
- State: Illinois
- County: Cook
- Township: Norwood Park

Government
  - Mayor: Arlene Jezierny

Area
  - Total: 0.83 sq mi (2.14 km^{2})
  - Land: 0.83 sq mi (2.14 km^{2})
  - Water: 0 sq mi (0.00 km^{2})

Population (2020)
  - Total: 9,065
  - Density: 10,990.3/sq mi (4,243.39/km^{2})
- Time zone: UTC-6 (CST)
  - Summer (DST): UTC-5 (CDT)
- ZIP Code(s): 60706
- Area code: 708
- FIPS code: 17-33435
- Website: www.harwoodheights.org

Harwood Heights is a village in Cook County, Illinois, United States. The population was 9,065 at the 2020 census. Harwood Heights and neighboring Norridge form an enclave surrounded by the city of Chicago.

== Geography ==
According to the 2010 census, Harwood Heights has a total area of 0.82 square miles (2.12 km^{2}), all land.

Harwood Heights and Norridge are surrounded by Chicago.

== Demographics ==
Historical population
Census	Pop.	Note	%±
1950	655		—
1960	5,688		768.4%
1970	9,060		59.3%
1980	8,228		−9.2%
1990	7,680		−6.7%
2000	8,297		8.0%
2010	8,612		3.8%
2020	9,065		5.3%
U.S. Decennial Census

=== Racial and ethnic composition ===
Harwood Heights village, Illinois – Racial and ethnic composition Note: the US Census treats Hispanic/Latino as an ethnic category. This table excludes Latinos from the racial categories and assigns them to a separate category. Hispanics/Latinos may be of any race.
Race / Ethnicity (NH = Non-Hispanic)	Pop 2000	Pop 2010	Pop 2020	% 2000	% 2010	% 2020
White alone (NH)	7,339	6,747	6,483	88.45%	78.34%	71.52%
Black or African American alone (NH)	22	53	66	0.27%	0.62%	0.73%
Native American or Alaska Native alone (NH)	15	14	12	0.18%	0.16%	0.13%
Asian alone (NH)	364	610	861	4.39%	7.08%	9.50%
Pacific Islander alone (NH)	2	1	0	0.02%	0.01%	0.00%
Other race alone (NH)	1	5	13	0.01%	0.06%	0.14%
Mixed race or Multiracial (NH)	70	113	171	0.84%	1.31%	1.89%
Hispanic or Latino (any race)	484	1,069	1,459	5.83%	12.41%	16.09%
Total	8,297	8,612	9,065	100.00%	100.00%	100.00%

=== 2020 census ===
As of the 2020 census, Harwood Heights had a population of 9,065. The median age was 43.8 years. 18.3% of residents were under the age of 18 and 19.6% were 65 years of age or older. For every 100 females there were 93.0 males, and for every 100 females age 18 and over there were 91.9 males.

100.0% of residents lived in urban areas, while 0.0% lived in rural areas.

There were 3,648 households in Harwood Heights, of which 27.5% had children under the age of 18 living in them. Of all households, 46.7% were married-couple households, 19.5% were households with a male householder and no spouse or partner present, and 29.1% were households with a female householder and no spouse or partner present. About 29.8% of all households were made up of individuals and 13.5% had someone living alone who was 65 years of age or older.

There were 3,790 housing units, of which 3.7% were vacant. The homeowner vacancy rate was 1.1% and the rental vacancy rate was 4.2%.

=== Income and poverty ===
The median income for a household in the village was $67,745, and the median income for a family was $90,821. Males had a median income of $52,317 versus $32,208 for females. The per capita income for the village was $33,171. About 8.5% of families and 10.3% of the population were below the poverty line, including 15.7% of those under age 18 and 12.7% of those age 65 or over.

== Government and politics ==
As of 2021, the mayor is Arlene Jezierny. She is the second woman to serve as mayor in Harwood Heights, the first being Margaret Fuller.

Harwood Heights is located in the Eisenhower Public Library District, Triton Community College District 504, Ridgewood High School School District 234, School Districts 86, 79, and 80, and the Norwood Park Fire Protection District.

Harwood Heights is located in Illinois's 5th congressional district which is represented in the 117th United States Congress by Mike Quigley (D–Chicago). In the Illinois General Assembly, Harwood Heights is located in the 10th Legislative District, 19th House District, and 20th House District. In the 101st General Assembly, Harwood Heights is represented by Robert Martwick (D–Chicago) in the Illinois Senate and represented by Lindsey LaPointe (D–Chicago) and Bradley Stephens (R–Rosemont) in the Illinois House of Representatives.

For the purposes of the Cook County Board of Commissioners, Harwood Heights is in the 9th district represented by Peter Silvestri (R-Elmwood Park). It is located in the 10th and 11th Judicial Subcircuits of the Cook County Circuit Clerk.

For the purposes of elections, Harwood Heights is split into five precincts; Norwood Park 1, Norwood Park 5, Norwood Park 12, Norwood Park 15, and Norwood Park 17. In the 2020 presidential election, Harwood Heights cast 1,878 votes for Donald Trump and 1,692 votes for Joe Biden. Forty-six voters chose third-party candidates and 42 voters pulled a ballot, but abstained from voting for any candidate for president.

== Local culture and media ==
Ridgewood High School Multimedia Clubs, which claim to be "the only media outlet in Norridge and Harwood Heights", and has 4 stations: The radio club produces "Jack FM 89.7 WRHS-FM Norridge" and "Theatre of the Ears on Smooth 88.1 WRWX-FM Harwood Heights/Jack Frost 88.1 WXMS Harwood Heights"; the television department runs in-house station "WRWX Television 4"; and the television club runs "WRHS Television 19".

Ridgemoor Country Club is located on Gunnison Street and is one of the oldest Chicago area golf clubs originating in 1905. In 1942 the U.S. Open Golf Tournament was cancelled because of World War II and as a replacement the Chicago District Golf Association and the PGA sponsored a tournament called The Hale America National Open Golf Tournament. The tournament was won by Ben Hogan and raised over $20,000 for the Navy Relief Society and the U.S.O.

== Education ==
=== Public schools ===
Three elementary school districts serve Harwood Heights:

- Pennoyer Elementary School District 79
- Norridge School District 80
- Union Ridge School District 86

Two high school districts serve Harwood Heights:

- Maine Township High School District 207 (Maine South High School)
- Ridgewood High School

=== Colleges and universities ===
Triton Junior College serves Harwood Heights.

=== Libraries ===
Eisenhower Public Library District serves Harwood Heights and Norridge.

== Transportation ==
Public transportation within the village is provided by the Chicago Transit Authority, which provides bus service along the major streets through to Chicago on all sides. The village's main business district is along Harlem Avenue (carrying Illinois Route 43), a short distance south of the Kennedy Expressway and the northern Harlem station of the CTA Blue Line rapid transit route.

== Sister cities ==
Harwood Heights is twinned with two cities: Rocchetta a Volturno, Italy, and Dzierżoniów, Poland.
