= Oak Park Township, Illinois =

Coordinates: 41°53′15″N 87°47′22″W

Oak Park Township
- Township
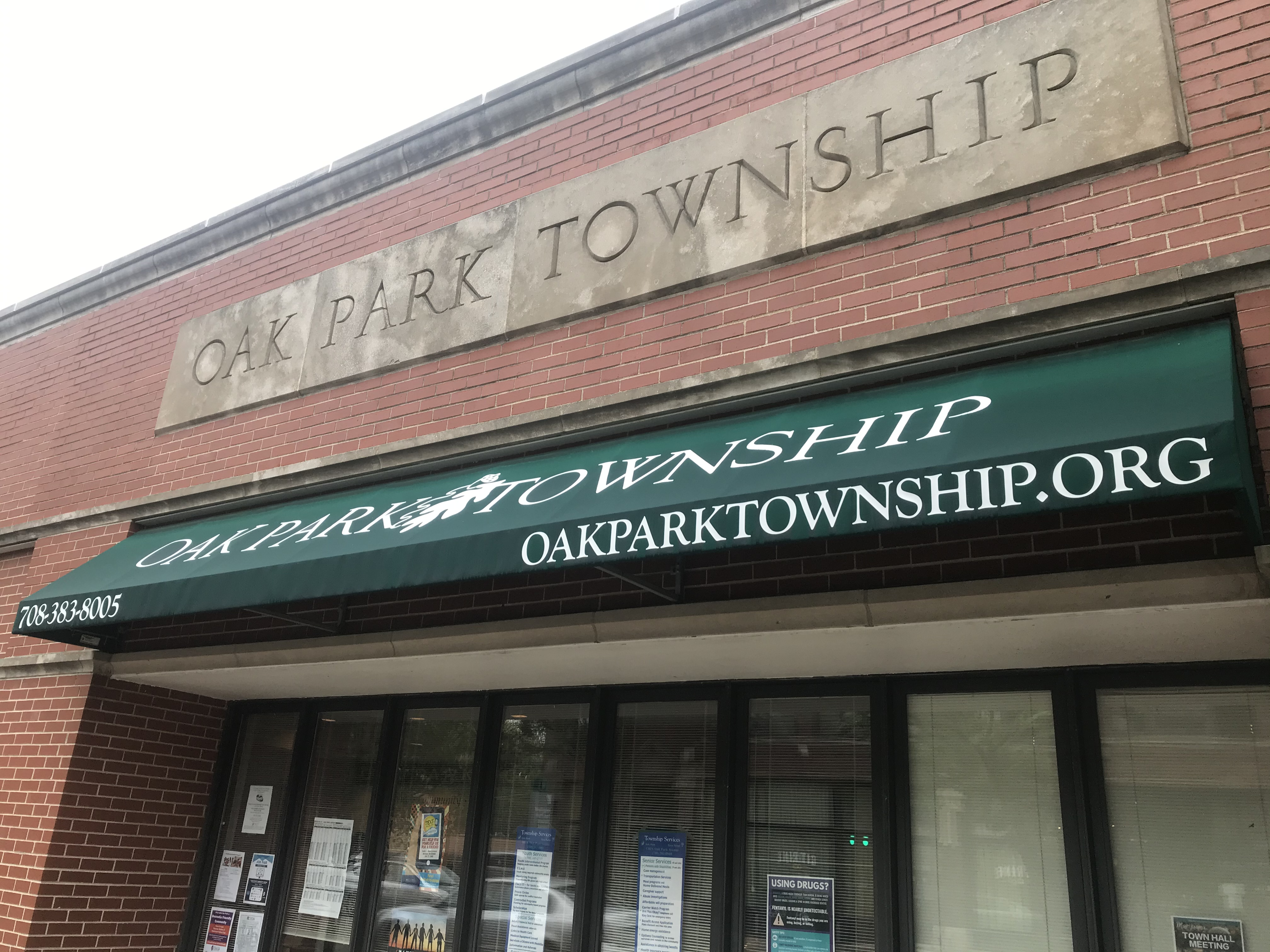
- Main entrance of the office of Oak Park Township on South Oak Park Avenue, Oak Park, IL

- Location in Cook County
- Country: United States
- State: Illinois
- County: Cook

Government
  - Supervisor: Jonathan Bender

Area
  - Total: 4.70 sq mi (12.17 km^{2})
  - Land: 4.70 sq mi (12.17 km^{2})
  - Water: 0 sq mi (0.0 km^{2}) 0.0%
- Elevation: 623 ft (190 m)

Population (2020)
  - Total: 54,583
  - Density: 11,620/sq mi (4,485/km^{2})
- Time zone: UTC-6 (CST)
  - Summer (DST): UTC-5 (CDT)
- FIPS code: 17-031-54898
- Website: www.oakparktownship.org

Oak Park Township is one of 29 townships in Cook County, Illinois and its boundaries are coterminous with the village of Oak Park. As of the 2020 census, the population was 54,583.

== Geography ==
According to the 2021 census gazetteer files, Oak Park Township has a total area of 4.70 square miles (12.17 km^{2}), all land.

== Demographics ==
Historical population
Census	Pop.	Note	%±
2000	52,524		—
2010	51,878		−1.2%
2020	54,583		5.2%

As of the 2020 census there were 54,583 people, 21,701 households, and 12,774 families residing in the township. The population density was 11,613.40 inhabitants per square mile (4,483.96/km^{2}). There were 25,953 housing units at an average density of 5,521.91 per square mile (2,132.02/km^{2}). The racial makeup of the township was 62.02% White, 19.08% African American, 0.31% Native American, 5.46% Asian, 0.04% Pacific Islander, 2.66% from other races, and 10.42% from two or more races. Hispanic or Latino of any race were 9.31% of the population.

There were 21,701 households, out of which 30.40% had children under the age of 18 living with them, 45.56% were married couples living together, 9.89% had a female householder with no spouse present, and 41.14% were non-families. 35.30% of all households were made up of individuals, and 13.40% had someone living alone who was 65 years of age or older. The average household size was 2.38 and the average family size was 3.14.

The township's age distribution consisted of 23.8% under the age of 18, 6.1% from 18 to 24, 27% from 25 to 44, 27.5% from 45 to 64, and 15.7% who were 65 years of age or older. The median age was 40.6 years. For every 100 females, there were 87.7 males. For every 100 females age 18 and over, there were 83.5 males.

The median income for a household in the township was $96,945, and the median income for a family was $142,785. Males had a median income of $79,284 versus $54,639 for females. The per capita income for the township was $58,262. About 3.3% of families and 7.0% of the population were below the poverty line, including 3.7% of those under age 18 and 8.7% of those age 65 or over.

== Adjacent townships ==
- Leyden Township (northwest)
- River Forest Township (west)
- Proviso Township (west)
- Berwyn Township (south)
- Cicero Township (southeast)
