= Jacob Bohlander House =

Historic house in Illinois, United States

- U.S. National Register of Historic Places
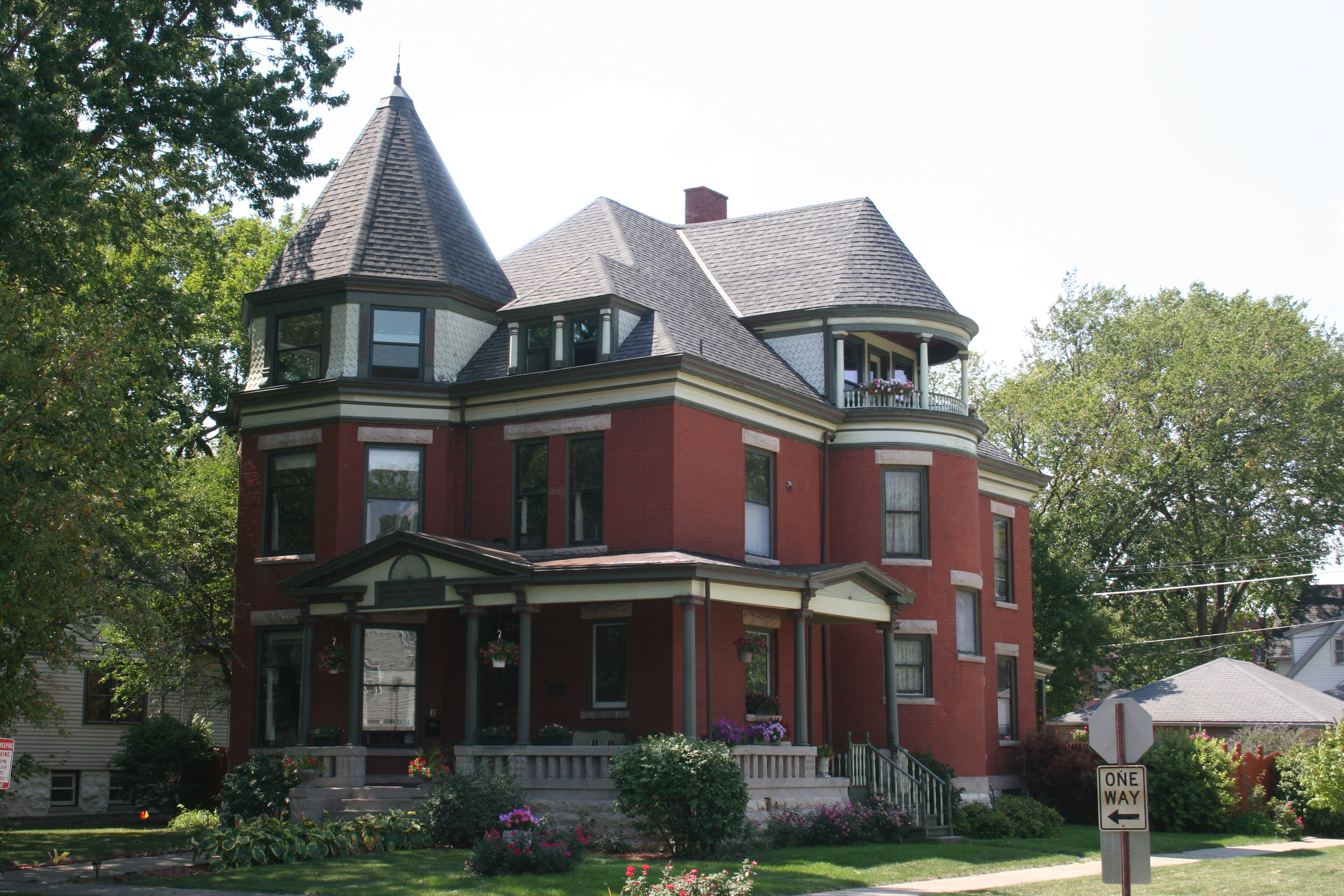

- Location within Chicago metropolitan area Location within Illinois Location within the United States
- Location: 316 N. 4th Ave., Maywood, Illinois
- Coordinates: 41°53′27″N 87°50′18″W
- Area: less than one acre
- Built: c. 1894; 132 years ago
- Architectural style: Queen Anne
- NRHP reference No.: 89001113
- Added to NRHP: August 21, 1989

The Jacob Bohlander House is a historic house at 316 N. 4th Avenue in Maywood, Illinois. Jacob Bohlander, a local merchant who was Maywood's village president at the time, built the house circa 1894. The Bohlander family were among the earliest settlers of Proviso Township, and Jacob and his siblings all held positions in local government or led local businesses. The house was designed in a subtype of Queen Anne architecture known as free classical, which incorporated Neoclassical elements into the style. It includes a hexagonal tower, a rounded turret, a wraparound front porch, and multiple dormers.

The house was added to the National Register of Historic Places on August 21, 1989.
