= Norridge, Illinois =

Village in Cook County, Illinois, US

- Village
- Flag wordmark
- Motto: The Community of "Compassion, Care, Hope"
- Location of Norridge in Cook County, Illinois

- Location within Greater Chicago Location within Illinois Location within the United States
- Coordinates: 41°57′54″N 87°49′26″W
- Country: United States
- State: Illinois
- County: Cook
- Township: Norwood Park, Leyden

Government
  - President: Daniel Tannhauser

Area
  - Total: 1.81 sq mi (4.68 km^{2})
  - Land: 1.81 sq mi (4.68 km^{2})
  - Water: 0 sq mi (0.00 km^{2})

Population (2020)
  - Total: 15,251
  - Density: 8,436.6/sq mi (3,257.39/km^{2})
- Time zone: UTC−6 (CST)
  - Summer (DST): UTC−5 (CDT)
- ZIP Code: 60706
- Area codes: 708/464
- Website: www.villageofnorridge.com

Norridge is a village in Norwood Park Township, Cook County, Illinois, United States. The village and its neighbor to the east, Harwood Heights, together form an enclave within the city of Chicago. Norridge is sometimes referred to as the "Island Within a City". As of the 2020 census, Norridge had a population of 15,251. The area that would eventually become Norridge was settled by farmers in 1830. The first names of what would become Norridge were "Goat Village", due to a local resident's goat farm, and "Swamp" due to a lack of streets and the area's swamp-like conditions. Norridge's early borders were Ozanam Ave, Olcott Avenue, Irving Park Road, and Montrose Avenue. In 1948, a local improvement association incorporated Norridge as a village, stymieing an effort by Chicago to annex the area.

== Name origin ==
The name "Norridge" was suggested by resident Mrs. Link. "Nor" comes from Norwood Park Township, and "Ridge" comes from the nearby suburb of Park Ridge. Norridge is sometimes referred to as the "Island Within a City".

== History ==
Farmers first established settlements in the area in the 1830s. Located in Norwood Park Township, the first names of what would become Norridge were "Goat Village", due to a local resident's goat farm, and "Swamp" due to a lack of streets and the area's swamp-like conditions. Norridge began as an 80-acre (320,000 m^{2}) subdivision that ran from Ozanam Avenue in the west to Olcott Avenue in the east and from Irving Park Road in the south to Montrose Avenue in the north. In 1948, a local improvement association incorporated Norridge as a village, stymieing an effort by Chicago to annex the area. The 1950s was a decade of growth and development, encouraged by the paving of sidewalks, streets, and curbs, and the installation of storm and sanitary sewers. In 1954 Norridge annexed land north from Montrose to Lawrence.

Norridge borders the Cook County Forest Preserves and was home to several horse stables, including Happy Days Stables at Montrose and Cumberland. Most of the stables were gone by the late 1970s.

== Geography ==
According to the 2021 census gazetteer files, Norridge has a total area of 1.81 square miles (4.69 km^{2}), all land.

== Demographics ==
Historical population
Census	Pop.	Note	%±
1950	3,428		—
1960	14,087		310.9%
1970	17,113		21.5%
1980	16,483		−3.7%
1990	14,459		−12.3%
2000	14,582		0.9%
2010	14,572		−0.1%
2020	15,251		4.7%
U.S. Decennial Census

=== Racial and ethnic composition ===
Norridge village, Illinois – Racial and ethnic composition Note: the US Census treats Hispanic/Latino as an ethnic category. This table excludes Latinos from the racial categories and assigns them to a separate category. Hispanics/Latinos may be of any race.
Race / Ethnicity (NH = Non-Hispanic)	Pop 2000	Pop 2010	Pop 2020	% 2000	% 2010	% 2020
White alone (NH)	13,492	12,745	12,234	92.53%	87.46%	80.22%
Black or African American alone (NH)	13	63	60	0.09%	0.43%	0.39%
Native American or Alaska Native alone (NH)	8	8	2	0.05%	0.05%	0.01%
Asian alone (NH)	396	574	910	2.72%	3.94%	5.97%
Pacific Islander alone (NH)	1	1	7	0.01%	0.01%	0.05%
Other race alone (NH)	10	14	41	0.07%	0.10%	0.27%
Mixed race or Multiracial (NH)	109	94	207	0.75%	0.65%	1.36%
Hispanic or Latino (any race)	553	1,073	1,790	3.79%	7.36%	11.74%
Total	14,582	14,572	15,251	100.00%	100.00%	100.00%

=== 2020 census ===
As of the 2020 census, Norridge had a population of 15,251. The population density was 8,435.29 inhabitants per square mile (3,256.88/km^{2}). The racial makeup of the village was 82.94% White, 0.43% African American, 0.38% Native American, 6.08% Asian, 0.07% Pacific Islander, 4.36% from other races, and 5.74% from two or more races. Hispanic or Latino residents of any race were 11.74% of the population.

The median age was 45.4 years. 18.6% of residents were under the age of 18 and 23.3% were 65 years of age or older. For every 100 females, there were 91.6 males, and for every 100 females age 18 and over, there were 89.1 males age 18 and over.

100.0% of residents lived in urban areas, while 0.0% lived in rural areas.

There were 5,708 households in Norridge, of which 28.8% had children under the age of 18 living in them. Of all households, 51.9% were married-couple households, 16.6% were households with a male householder and no spouse or partner present, and 27.5% were households with a female householder and no spouse or partner present. About 26.2% of all households were made up of individuals, and 15.2% had someone living alone who was 65 years of age or older. There were 5,956 housing units at an average density of 3,294.25 per square mile (1,271.92/km^{2}), of which 4.2% were vacant. The homeowner vacancy rate was 1.3% and the rental vacancy rate was 4.7%.

=== Income and poverty ===
The median income for a household in the village was $78,300, and the median income for a family was $93,170. Males had a median income of $58,365 versus $39,837 for females. The per capita income for the village was $36,959. About 1.9% of families and 3.9% of the population were below the poverty line, including 5.8% of those under age 18 and 4.7% of those age 65 or over.

== Government ==
As of the 2023 elections, the current elected officials of the Village of Norridge are: The current President of Norridge is Daniel Tannhauser.

== Education ==
=== Public schools ===
Public elementary school districts serving Norridge include:

- Pennoyer Elementary School District 79
- Norridge School District 80 (James Giles School and John V. Leigh School)
- Union Ridge School District 86

Public high school districts include:

- Maine Township High School District 207 (Maine South High School)
- Ridgewood High School District 234

=== Churches ===
- Divine Savior Church (Merged with St. Eugene Church and Our Lady Mother of the Church)

=== Libraries ===
Eisenhower Public Library District serves Harwood Heights and Norridge.

== Transportation ==
Bus service in the village is provided by both Pace and CTA.

== Notable people ==
- Bruce Artwick, creator of the first consumer flight simulator software; founder of Sublogic
- Nicholas Calabrese, the first made man ever to testify against the Chicago Outfit
- James Fotopoulos, independent filmmaker of over 100 films, including Christabel
- Robert F. Martwick Jr., Democratic member of the Illinois Senate; formerly a Norridge trustee
- Gene Nudo, head coach of the Arizona Rattlers, then of the Arena Football League
- Jeff Schroeder, season 11 and season 13 contestant on Big Brother, season 16 contestant on The Amazing Race
- Dino Stamatopoulos, comedy writer, actor and producer (Mr. Show, TV Funhouse, Mad TV, The Dana Carvey Show, Late Show with David Letterman and Late Night with Conan O'Brien)
- Joseph A. Tunzi, author, publisher, self-publisher, producer, archivist, researcher and historian; has been described as "one of the foremost authorities on Elvis Presley"
