= Joseph M. Lyons =

American politician

Joseph Lyons

Member of the Illinois House of Representatives from the 19th district 15th district (1996-2003)
- In office August 12, 1996 – January 9, 2013
- Preceded by: William Laurino
- Succeeded by: Robert Martwick

Personal details
- Born: June 24, 1951 (age 75) Chicago, Illinois
- Party: Democratic
- Spouse: Kieran
- Children: Two
- Education: DePaul University (B.A., M.P.A.)
- Profession: Civil servant

Joseph M. Lyons is an American politician and former Democratic member of the Illinois House of Representatives. He served from 1996 until 2013 representing the 15th, and later 19th, district.

== Biography ==
Lyons was born June 24, 1951, in Chicago. His uncle is Thomas G. Lyons, who served as Chairman of the Cook County Democratic Party from 1990 to 1997. He earned a bachelor's degree in political science and history from DePaul University in 1975. He was a supervisor in the Chicago Water Department from 1975 until 1981. He worked for the Regional Transportation Authority for a year in 1980. He then took a position with the Cook County Department of Human Resources.

In the 1996 Democratic primary, he ran and won a four-way primary to succeed William Laurino in the 15th district. He was appointed to the Illinois House of Representatives August 12, 1996 after he won the Democratic nomination. After the 2001 decennial redistricting process, Lyons was redistricted to the 19th district. He was the Chair of the Chicago White Sox Caucus. Lyons chose to retire after the 97th Illinois General Assembly in 2011–2012. At the time of his retirement he was the Assistant Majority Leader.

He was succeeded by Robert Martwick.
