= Ridgewood High School (Illinois) =

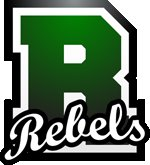

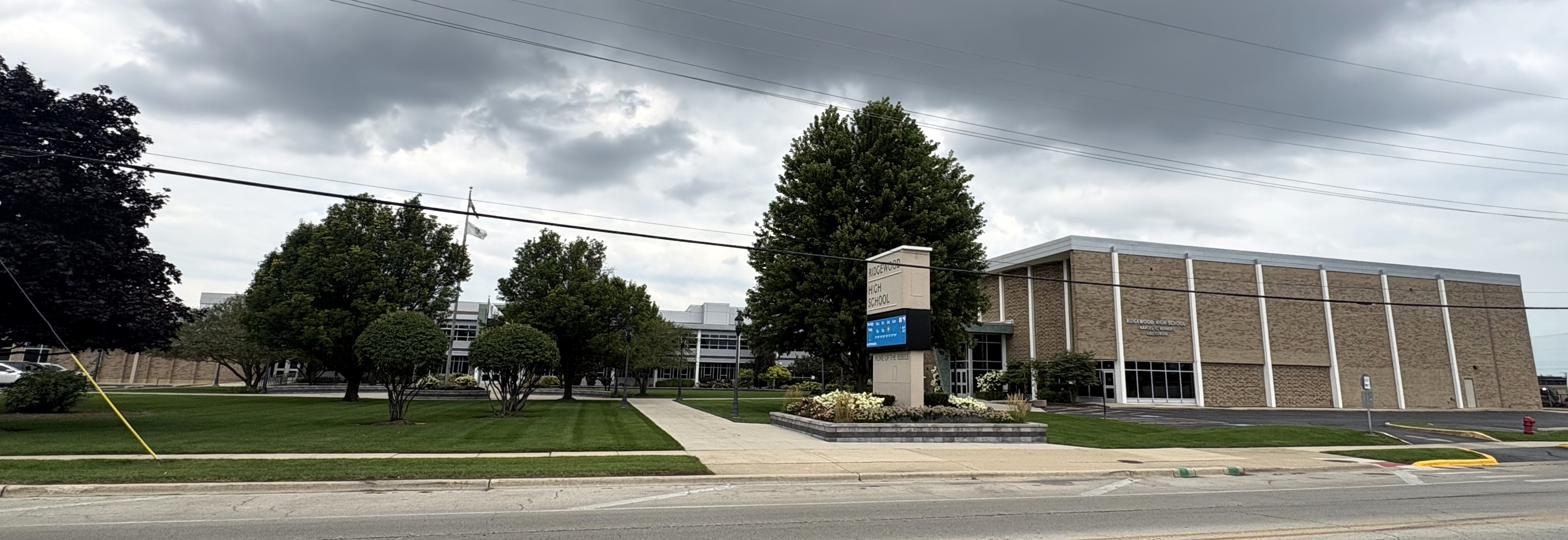

Location
- 7500 West Montrose Avenue; Norridge, Illinois 60706; United States; 41°57′39″N 87°48′53″W

Information
- Type: Public secondary
- Established: 1960
- Principal: Eric Lasky
- Teaching staff: 60.05 (FTE)
- Grades: 9–12
- Enrollment: 988 (2024-2025)
- Student to teacher ratio: 16.45
- Colors: Kelly green, white
- Nickname: Rebels
- Rival: Elmwood Park Tigers
- Newspaper: The Ridgewood Review
- Yearbook: The Imperial
- Website: www.d234.org

Ridgewood High School, or RHS, is a public four-year high school located in Norridge, Illinois, an enclave suburb surrounded by Chicago and Harwood Heights, in the United States. It is part of Ridgewood Community High School District 234.

The school serves portions of Norridge, Harwood Heights, and unincorporated Norwood Park Township.

== Athletics ==
Ridgewood competes in the Upstate Eight Conference and Illinois High School Association. Its mascot is the Rebel. Ridgewood has the following teams.

- Men's Football
- Men's Soccer
- Men's Baseball
- Men's Basketball
- Men's Wrestling
- Men's Volleyball
- Women's Volleyball
- Women's Softball
- Women's Soccer
- Women's Basketball
- Women's Tennis
- Track & Field
- Cross Country
- Cheerleading
- Pom Poms
