= Pennoyer School District 79 =

School district in Illinois, United States

Address
- 5200 N Cumberland Avenue Norridge, Illinois, 60706; United States

District information
- Type: Public
- Grades: PreK–8
- NCES District ID: 1731200

Students and staff
- Students: 430

Other information
- Website: www.pennoyerschool.org

Pennoyer School District 79 is a school district headquartered in Norridge, Illinois. It operates the K-8 school Pennoyer School.

In addition to Norridge it also serves Harwood Heights and Norwood Park Township.

Kristin Kopta of Arlington Heights became the superintendent on July 1, 2016.

Built in 1956, Pennoyer School has not seen any major renovations, and is beyond its 25-year life expectancy. It still has its original lead piping. Two prior efforts to renovate the school, in 2018 and 2020, failed to pass their referendums due to the steep $25 million and $10.9 million price tag that would result in a new tax. The proposed $7.9 million renovation in 2021 also failed, with 53% of voters rejecting it.
