= Thatcher Homes =

Coordinates: 41.9575°N 87.8344°W

Thatcher Homes were a post–World War II housing complex set up in Norwood Park Township in the suburbs of Chicago, Illinois.

== History ==
During the last half of the 1940s with the return of hundreds of thousands of veterans from the Second World War, there arose an acute housing shortage as these vets married and began to raise their families. Many of them lived with parents or other relatives until the U.S. Congress passed legislation creating the Federal Housing Administration and authorizing it to contract with local authorities to construct temporary veterans housing. Under this authorization, the Chicago Housing Authority contracted to lease a parcel of land from the Cook County Forest Preserve District. The area in Norwood Park Township northwest of Chicago, between Montrose Ave. on the north and Berteau Ave. on the south and between Thatcher Ave. on the east and Pueblo Ave. (later renamed Cumberland Ave.) on the west, was designated as one of those temporary housing sites and was named Thatcher Homes.

The agency contracted with Stran-Steel (a Division of Great Lakes Steel Corporation) and Kimberly-Clark (maker of recently declassified Kimsul insulation) to erect approximately 184 units patterned after the Nissen Quonset Hut that had been so successful in Alaska and other areas of the Pacific. Because of the difficulty in placing furniture against the curved walls of the Quonset, the plan was later modified to include approximately 57 barracks-like structures with straight walls. While the Quonsets were built over plywood floors on steel joists placed directly on the ground, the barracks were slightly elevated on wooden joists over an 18-to-24-inch (46 to 61 cm) crawl space which aided in heating them during the winter months.

Construction began in 1946 and was completed before the end of 1947 when the first families began to move in. The external construction utilized corrugated sheet steel for roofs and siding while the portions which contacted the ground were covered with a 3/16-inch (4.8 mm) thick asbestos shingle which measured 2 by 4 feet (0.61 by 1.22 m). Provisions of the lease agreement between the housing authority and the forest preserve undoubtedly called for the preservation of foliage and natural drainage patterns. No trees were allowed to be cut and the diagonal drainage swale ditch that divided the acreage was to remain unchanged.

The main street of crushed rock and gravel (called Robinson Drive in honor of the Potawatomi Indian chief who once lived nearby) ran parallel to and about 50–60 feet north of the drainage ditch. Pittsburg Avenue with a slight jog to the east was extended northward from that location parallel to Thatcher which remained a gravel covered back road. Hutchinson Drive ran parallel to the main street from the alley between Pontiac and Plainfield to Pittsburg Avenue. The local Canty Branch School established a Kindergarten in the building set aside for that use midway (at 8220) on Robinson Drive. A Certified / Centrella Grocery Store shared an oversized quonset with a Laundromat just west of the school.

The lease period evidently expired at the end of 1954 when all of the residents were required to vacate the units. They were demolished in late 1954 and early 1955. Only the fire hydrants remain where the gravel streets used to be. Occasional requests by children and grandchildren to show them where mom and dad or grandma and grandpa lived when they were very young had to be limited to a short walk through the picnic grounds until a USGS aerial survey map of 1951 was located and gave evidence to this long since forgotten part of unincorporated Norwood Park Township. Over 800 families once lived in this more than 33-acre (13 ha) area which contains no evidence of their existence today.
