= Ridgemoor Country Club =

Country club in Illinois, U.S.

- Entrance to Ridgemoor Country Club in 2026.

- Location within Chicago metropolitan area Location within Illinois Location within the United States
- 41.966704°N 87.791800°W

Club information
- Location: Norwood Park Township, Cook County, Illinois, US
- Established: 1905
- Type: Private
- Total holes: 18
- Tournaments: Hale America National Open Golf Tournament (1942)
- Website: Ridgemoor Country Club
- Designed by: William Langford, A. W. Tillinghast
- Par: 72
- Length: 6922 yards
- Course rating: 74.1
- Slope rating: 137
- Course record: 62 - Ben Hogan (1942) and Bob Zender (1984)

Ridgemoor Country Club is a country club located near Chicago, Illinois. It hosted the Hale America National Open Golf Tournament in 1942. Along with golf, the club also has swimming and tennis facilities.

== Hale America National Open Golf Tournament ==
The Hale America National Open Golf Tournament was a professional golf tournament on the PGA Tour that played for a single year, 1942.

After the attack on Pearl Harbor and America's entry into World War II, the United States Golf Association's Executive Committee decided that it would be improper to play the 1942 U.S. Open. Additionally, the original site chosen for the event, Interlachen Country Club in Edina, Minnesota, opted not to serve as the host course. The USGA together with the PGA of America and the Chicago District Golf Association sponsored the Hale America Open in response to calls for a series of local tournaments to be played. It was intended to be a war-time substitute for the U.S. Open.

The event was held at Ridgemoor Country Club from June 18–21, 1942. The proceeds raised by the event (over $20,000) benefited the Navy Relief Society and the USO.

The tournament was won by Ben Hogan with a total score of 17-under-par 271, with rounds of 72-62-69-68. The runners-up, Jimmy Demaret and Mike Turnesa, were three strokes behind. Hogan received a gold medal and $1,200 in War Bonds for his win.

=== Controversy ===
Supporters of Ben Hogan and some golf historians maintain that this tournament should count as one of Hogan's major championships, since it was run just like the U.S. Open with more than 1,500 entries, local qualifying at 69 sites and sectional qualifying at most major cities. Additionally, only a few professional golfers were serving in the war at the time. Hogan himself considered the tournament to be a U.S. Open win.

== Holes ==
Hole #	Par	Yards
1	4	307
2	5	493
3	5	491
4	3	147
5	4	372
6	4	410
7	4	402
8	3	183
9	4	355

Hole #	Par	Yards
10	5	518
11	5	494
12	4	350
13	3	157
14	4	326
15	4	367
16	4	428
17	4	384
18	3	152
