= Norridge School District 80 =

School district near Chicago, Illinois

Address
- 8151 W Lawrence Avenue Norridge, Illinois, 60706; United States

District information
- Type: Public
- Grades: PreK–8
- NCES District ID: 1728650

Students and staff
- Students: 1,111~

Other information
- Website: www.norridge80.org

Norridge School District 80 is an elementary school district headquartered in Norridge, Illinois, in the Chicago metropolitan area.

It operates two schools: James Giles School (grades 5–8) and John Leigh School (grades Pre-Kindergarten to 4). The district headquarters and board office are at the Leigh School.

== History ==
In November 2016 the Superintendent proposed a tax increase that would bring in $60.6 million, but 77% of the voters rejected it. The district responded, in April 2017, by laying off three people who were in support roles, though it got back three laid off teachers and added a principal.

The district built a Science center that will promotes on-sight learning in STEAM in 2025.

In 2021, during the COVID-19 pandemic in Illinois, the district began having both in-person and virtual learning options as vaccine usage increased.

== Programs ==
In 2018 the district announced that a decrease in the budget would result in the Band closure, so advocates began privately raising money and making a Facebook page campaigning to save it. The band program was saved by the community.

As of 2020, the district expanded the STEAM program by creating a large onsite Science Center. Additional SD80 programs are Soccer, Volleyball, Softball, Cheer, track and field, Basketball, cadet and concert Band.
