= Proviso Township, Illinois =

Proviso Township
- Township
- Flag Seal

- Location in Cook County

- Cook County's location in Illinois
- Coordinates: 41°51′52″N 87°52′14″W
- Country: United States
- State: Illinois
- County: Cook

Government
  - Type: Township
  - Supervisor: Michael Corrigan

Area
  - Total: 29.68 sq mi (76.86 km^{2})
  - Land: 29.68 sq mi (76.86 km^{2})
  - Water: 0 sq mi (0 km^{2}) 0%
- Elevation: 627 ft (191 m)

Population (2020)
  - Total: 151,209
  - Density: 5,095/sq mi (1,967/km^{2})
- Time zone: UTC-6 (CST)
  - Summer (DST): UTC-5 (CDT)
- ZIP codes: 60104, 60126, 60130, 60141, 60153, 60154, 60155, 60160, 60161, 60162, 60163, 60164, 60165, 60305, 60513, 60521, 60525, 60526, 60546, 60558
- Area codes: 630/331, 708/464
- FIPS code: 17-031-62133
- Website: www.provisotownship.gov

Proviso Township is one of 29 townships in Cook County, Illinois, United States. As of the 2020 census, its population was 151,209. It was organized in 1850 and originally named "Taylor", but shortly afterward its name was changed to make reference to the Wilmot Proviso, a contemporary piece of legislation intended to stop the spread of slavery.

The Proviso Township government office is located at 4565 West Harrison Street, Hillside, IL 60162.

== Geography ==
According to the United States Census Bureau, Proviso Township covers an area of 29.68 square miles (76.9 km^{2}).

=== Cities, towns, villages ===
- Bellwood
- Berkeley
- Broadview
- Brookfield (northwest half)
- Elmhurst (small portions)
- Forest Park
- Hillside
- Hinsdale (small portion)
- La Grange Park
- Maywood
- Melrose Park (vast majority)
- North Riverside (small portions)
- Northlake (south quarter)
- Oak Brook (parts of certain residential lots)
- Stone Park
- Westchester
- Western Springs (only small portion of Village)

=== Unincorporated towns ===
- Hines at 41.853611°N 87.839447°W
- Hollywood (mostly in Riverside Township)

=== Extinct town ===
- Harlem at 41.864729°N 87.818814°W

=== Adjacent townships ===
- Leyden Township (north)
- River Forest Township (northeast)
- Berwyn Township (east)
- Oak Park Township (east)
- Riverside Township (southeast)
- Lyons Township (south)
- Downers Grove Township, DuPage County (southwest)
- York Township, DuPage County (west)
- Addison Township, DuPage County (northwest)

=== Cemeteries ===
The township contains these fifteen cemeteries: Concordia, Forest Home, Free Sons of Israel, Glen Oak, Immanuel, Joseph and Sons Incorporated, Menorah, Mount Carmel, Oak Ridge, Old Settlers, Parkholm, Queen of Heaven, Waldheim, and Woodlawn.

=== Major highways ===
- Interstate 88
- Interstate 290
- Interstate 294
- U.S. Route 12
- U.S. Route 20
- U.S. Route 34
- Illinois Route 38
- Illinois Route 64

=== Airports and landing strips ===
- 86th USARCOM Heliport
- Chicago Airmail Field (historical)
- Loyola University Medical Center Heliport
- Sauerman Heliport

=== Landmarks ===
- Edward Hines Veterans Administration Hospital
- Loyola University Medical Center
- Millers Meadows (Forest Preserve District of Cook County)
- Thatcher Woods (Forest Preserve District of Cook County)
- Wolf Road Prairie (Forest Preserve District of Cook County & Illinois Department of Natural Resources)
- Westchester Woods (Forest Preserve District of Cook County)

== Demographics ==
As of the 2020 census there were 151,209 people, 53,460 households, and 34,929 families residing in the township. The population density was 5,087.96 inhabitants per square mile (1,964.47/km^{2}). There were 59,748 housing units at an average density of 2,010.43 per square mile (776.23/km^{2}). The racial makeup of the township was 34.18% White, 32.23% African American, 1.15% Native American, 2.28% Asian, 0.03% Pacific Islander, 18.52% from other races, and 11.61% from two or more races. Hispanic or Latino of any race were 34.09% of the population.

There were 53,460 households, out of which 31.50% had children under the age of 18 living with them, 43.88% were married couples living together, 15.95% had a female householder with no spouse present, and 34.66% were non-families. 29.80% of all households were made up of individuals, and 14.00% had someone living alone who was 65 years of age or older. The average household size was 2.74 and the average family size was 3.47.

The township's age distribution consisted of 22.1% under the age of 18, 8.2% from 18 to 24, 27.4% from 25 to 44, 26.4% from 45 to 64, and 15.9% who were 65 years of age or older. The median age was 39.2 years. For every 100 females, there were 94.7 males. For every 100 females age 18 and over, there were 90.2 males.

The median income for a household in the township was $67,891, and the median income for a family was $82,986. Males had a median income of $43,874 versus $36,071 for females. The per capita income for the township was $32,486. About 6.5% of families and 9.4% of the population were below the poverty line, including 12.2% of those under age 18 and 9.0% of those age 65 or over.

Historical population
Census	Pop.	Note	%±
1930	69,519		—
1940	73,349		5.5%
1950	98,228		33.9%
1960	160,275		63.2%
1970	172,536		7.6%
1980	156,519		−9.3%
1990	152,443		−2.6%
2000	155,831		2.2%
2010	151,704		−2.6%
2020	151,209		−0.3%
U.S. Decennial Census

== Education ==
The following public high school districts serve portions of Proviso Township: Lyons Township (La Grange Park and Western Springs), Riverside-Brookfield (Brookfield, North Riverside and Riverside) and Proviso Township High Schools (Forest Park, Westchester, Maywood, Berkley, Hillside, Melrose Park, Stone Park, Broadview and Bellwood).

== Political districts ==
- Illinois' 3rd Congressional District
- Illinois' 7th Congressional District
- State House District 07
- State House District 08
- State House District 21
- State House District 41
- State House District 77
- State House District 78
- State Senate District 04
- State Senate District 11
- State Senate District 21
- State Senate District 39
- Cook County Commissioner District 1
- Cook County Commissioner District 16

=== Company B of the 192nd Tank Battalion ===
Some graduates of the early 1940s were members of Company B of the 192nd Tank Battalion, an Illinois National Guard Unit, whose involvement in the Bataan Death March during World War II, has been commemorated every year in Maywood since 1942. 137 township residents were killed or captured during the event.
