= Union Ridge School District 86 =

School district in Illinois, United States

Address
- 4600 North Oak Park Avenue Harwood Heights, Illinois, 60706; United States

District information
- Type: Public
- Grades: PreK–8
- NCES District ID: 1739780

Students and staff
- Students: 638

Other information
- Website: www.urs86.org

Union Ridge School District 86 is a school district located in Harwood Heights, Illinois, United States.
