= Norwood Park Township, Illinois =

Norwood Park Township
- Township
- Seal
- Nickname: The Norwood Paradise
- Motto: "An Island in the City"
- Location in Cook County

- Cook County's location in Illinois
- Coordinates: 41°58′06″N 87°49′04″W
- Country: United States
- State: Illinois
- County: Cook

Government
  - Township supervisor: Anthony Nasca

Area
  - Total: 3.67 sq mi (9.51 km^{2})
  - Land: 3.67 sq mi (9.51 km^{2})
  - Water: 0 sq mi (0 km^{2}) 0%
- Elevation: 650 ft (198 m)

Population (2020)
  - Total: 27,441
  - Density: 7,470/sq mi (2,890/km^{2})
- Time zone: UTC-6 (CST)
  - Summer (DST): UTC-5 (CDT)
- ZIP codes: 60068, 60631, 60656, 60706
- FIPS code: 17-031-54430
- Website: norwoodpark.com

Norwood Park Township is one of 29 townships in Cook County, Illinois, United States. It is almost entirely surrounded by the city of Chicago. As of the 2020 census, its population was 27,441.

== Geography ==
According to the United States Census Bureau, Norwood Park Township covers an area of 3.67 square miles (9.5 km^{2}). Its ZIP Code is 60631.

=== Cities, towns, villages ===
- Harwood Heights
- Norridge (vast majority)
- Park Ridge (southeast edge)

=== Unincorporated areas ===
- a residential area surrounded by Norwood Park, Chicago
- the Ridgemoor Country Club adjacent to Harwood Heights
- the Westlawn Cemetery and Mausoleum adjacent to Norridge

=== Adjacent townships ===
- Leyden Township (southwest)
- Maine Township (northwest)

=== Cemeteries ===
The township contains these two cemeteries: Acacia Park and Westlawn Jewish.

=== Major highways ===
- Interstate 90
- Illinois Route 171
- Illinois Route 19
- Illinois Route 43

== History ==
=== 19th century ===
Norwood Park township was created in 1874 from parts of Jefferson Township, Leyden Township, Maine Township, and Niles Township.

Most of Norwood Park township was annexed to Chicago in 1893. The rest of the township did not vote for annexation into the city, becoming surrounded by Chicago.

=== 20th century ===
After World War II a housing complex called Thatcher Homes was built to accommodate war veterans and their families. The complex was demolished around 1955. Serial killer John Wayne Gacy lived in the township, killing his 33 victims at his home and burying most of the bodies in its crawlspace.

=== 21st century ===
The existence of Norwood Park Township, and its geography of unincorporated and disjointed sections, has led to several calls to abolish not just Norwood Park, but also all of the remaining townships in Cook County. In 2011, shortly after her election, Cook County Board President Toni Preckwinkle set a goal of eliminating all unincorporated land in the county by the end of the decade. The township does not pay taxes to the rest of the county for issues such as police, but are still receiving county police protection. In 2022 it was proposed by the Chicago magazine to have Norwood Park Township be annexed by the city of Chicago, along with 12 other villages, cities and townships that also border Chicago's city limits.

During the 2021 Township Supervisor election, one of the key campaign issues was that Norwood Park Township was the last township in Cook County that did not have a website. Following his re-election to a sixth term, Township Supervisor, Tom Lupo, prioritized the creation of one which was up in October 2021. It was also uncovered by a government watchdog group, Truth in Accounting, that Norwood Park Township had several major discrepancies in its budget, leveling accusations of either corruption or ineptitude to the 5 term incumbent Lupo. For example, the township's General Assistance Fund spends $89,400, while only receiving revenues of $5,150, resulting in a $84,250 deficit, in a township with only $124,979 on hand. Another pressing issue during this election was the aging Pennoyer School District 79. Built in 1956, the high school has not seen any major renovations, is beyond its 25-year life expectancy, and still has its original lead piping. Two prior efforts to renovate the school, in 2018 and 2020, failed to pass their referendums due to the steep $25 million and $10.9 million price tag that would result in a new tax. The proposed $7.9 million renovation in 2021 also failed, with 53% of voters rejecting it.

== Demographics ==
As of the 2020 census there were 27,441 people, 9,827 households, and 7,019 families residing in the township. The population density was 7,489.36 inhabitants per square mile (2,891.66/km^{2}). There were 10,676 housing units at an average density of 2,913.76 per square mile (1,125.01/km^{2}). The racial makeup of the township was 80.43% White, 0.55% African American, 0.39% Native American, 6.91% Asian, 0.04% Pacific Islander, 4.95% from other races, and 6.74% from two or more races. Hispanic or Latino of any race were 12.86% of the population.

There were 9,827 households, out of which 28.10% had children under the age of 18 living with them, 56.34% were married couples living together, 10.79% had a female householder with no spouse present, and 28.57% were non-families. 25.90% of all households were made up of individuals, and 13.80% had someone living alone who was 65 years of age or older. The average household size was 2.59 and the average family size was 3.15.

The township's age distribution consisted of 19.8% under the age of 18, 7.3% from 18 to 24, 24% from 25 to 44, 27% from 45 to 64, and 22.0% who were 65 years of age or older. The median age was 44.4 years. For every 100 females, there were 96.4 males. For every 100 females age 18 and over, there were 93.7 males.

The median income for a household in the township was $83,120, and the median income for a family was $100,629. Males had a median income of $60,700 versus $40,324 for females. The per capita income for the township was $39,487. About 3.7% of families and 5.5% of the population were below the poverty line, including 8.8% of those under age 18 and 5.9% of those age 65 or over.

Historical population
Census	Pop.	Note	%±
1970	30,947		—
1980	28,070		−9.3%
1990	25,600		−8.8%
2000	26,176		2.3%
2010	26,385		0.8%
2020	27,441		4.0%
U.S. Decennial Census

== Politics ==
Although Democrat Mike Quigley was reelected to Congress with 69% of the vote in 2024, his Republican opponent was favored by the township's voters by a 52%-48% margin. Norwood Park Township was also one of only five townships in Cook County to vote for Donald Trump in the 2024 presidential election, by a 57%-42% margin, and the only one not in the southwest part of the county.

=== Local government ===
The executive of Norwood Park is the township supervisor. The current supervisor, Anthony Nasca, has held the office since 2023. He succeeded Tom Lupo, who resigned on August 25, 2023. Other offices in the township includes:

- Eve Pokorny - Clerk
- Dennis Karns - Assessor
- Paul Alongi - Highway Commissioner
- Dennis Stefanowicz Jr. - Trustee
- Steve Wyda - Trustee
- Andrew Cichon - Trustee
- Frank Di Piero - Trustee

=== Representation ===
- Illinois's 5th congressional district
- State House District 19
- State House District 20
- State Senate District 10

== Notable resident ==
- John Wayne Gacy (1942-1994), convicted serial killer. Gacy killed and buried most of his victims in his home in unincorporated Norwood Park Township.
