= River Forest Township, Illinois =

Coordinates: 41°53′41″N 87°49′09″W

River Forest Township
- Township
- Flag

- Location in Cook County
- Country: United States
- State: Illinois
- County: Cook

Government
  - Supervisor: Carla Sloan

Area
  - Total: 2.48 sq mi (6.4 km^{2})
  - Land: 2.48 sq mi (6.4 km^{2})
  - Water: 0 sq mi (0.0 km^{2}) 0.08%
- Elevation: 633 ft (193 m)

Population (2020)
  - Total: 11,717
  - Density: 4,720/sq mi (1,820/km^{2})
- Time zone: UTC-6 (CST)
  - Summer (DST): UTC-5 (CDT)
- FIPS code: 17-031-64317
- GNIS feature ID: 429645
- Website: www.riverforesttownship.org

River Forest Township is one of 29 townships in Cook County, Illinois. The population was 11,717 at the 2020 census. River Forest Township is coterminous with the Village of River Forest. It is one of four coterminous townships in Cook County and one of fifteen coterminous townships statewide. Like the village, the township is bounded by Harlem Avenue, North Avenue, Madison Avenue to Lathrop Avenue, to Central Avenue and back to Harlem.

== History ==
The village incorporated in 1880 as part of Proviso Township. Miss Thatcher, a resident at that time, said, "The Village of River Forest was incorporated as a matter of necessity to defeat the saloonkeepers' project to organize and open a liquor sales district, and destroy our village." However, later that year, the village trustees licensed two saloons in the east part of the village to raise funds for running the government.

In 1917, the board of education petitioned the village to create a separate township in an effort to increase revenue to fund growing educational requirements. Cost savings were anticipated by avoiding the duplication of certain village and township officers. Taxes for township roads and bridges were eliminated. The plan also made funds raised by taxation immediately available to the community to support community interests. Finally, it was thought that an in-town assessor would provide a more equitable tax assessment. This separation was approved by citizens via a postcard referendum vote held on April 17, 1917.

== Geography ==
According to the 2021 census gazetteer files, River Forest Township has a total area of 2.48 square miles (6.42 km^{2}), of which 2.48 square miles (6.42 km^{2}) (or 99.92%) is land and 0.00 square miles (0.00 km^{2}) (or 0.08%) is water.

== Demographics ==
Historical population
Census	Pop.	Note	%±
2000	11,635		—
2010	11,172		−4.0%
2020	11,717		4.9%

As of the 2020 census there were 11,717 people, 4,040 households, and 2,754 families residing in the township. The population density was 4,720.79 inhabitants per square mile (1,822.71/km^{2}). There were 4,266 housing units at an average density of 1,718.78 per square mile (663.62/km^{2}). The racial makeup of the township was 72.91% White, 7.51% African American, 0.12% Native American, 8.01% Asian, 0.00% Pacific Islander, 2.70% from other races, and 8.75% from two or more races. Hispanic or Latino of any race were 8.46% of the population.

There were 4,040 households, out of which 35.40% had children under the age of 18 living with them, 60.69% were married couples living together, 4.80% had a female householder with no spouse present, and 31.83% were non-families. 31.80% of all households were made up of individuals, and 15.30% had someone living alone who was 65 years of age or older. The average household size was 2.47 and the average family size was 3.13.

The township's age distribution consisted of 25.4% under the age of 18, 10.5% from 18 to 24, 18.4% from 25 to 44, 28.3% from 45 to 64, and 17.3% who were 65 years of age or older. The median age was 40.8 years. For every 100 females, there were 95.4 males. For every 100 females age 18 and over, there were 92.5 males.

The median income for a household in the township was $125,288, and the median income for a family was $193,171. Males had a median income of $116,643 versus $57,703 for females. The per capita income for the township was $79,929. About 1.3% of families and 2.2% of the population were below the poverty line, including 3.2% of those under age 18 and 1.9% of those age 65 or over.
