= List of diplomatic missions of Chile =

The Republic of Chile has an extensive network of embassies and consulates around the world to support its foreign policy. Its international presence is listed below, excluding its large array of honorary consulates. Also excluded are trade missions, with the exception of the trade office in Taipei, which functions as a de facto embassy to Taiwan.

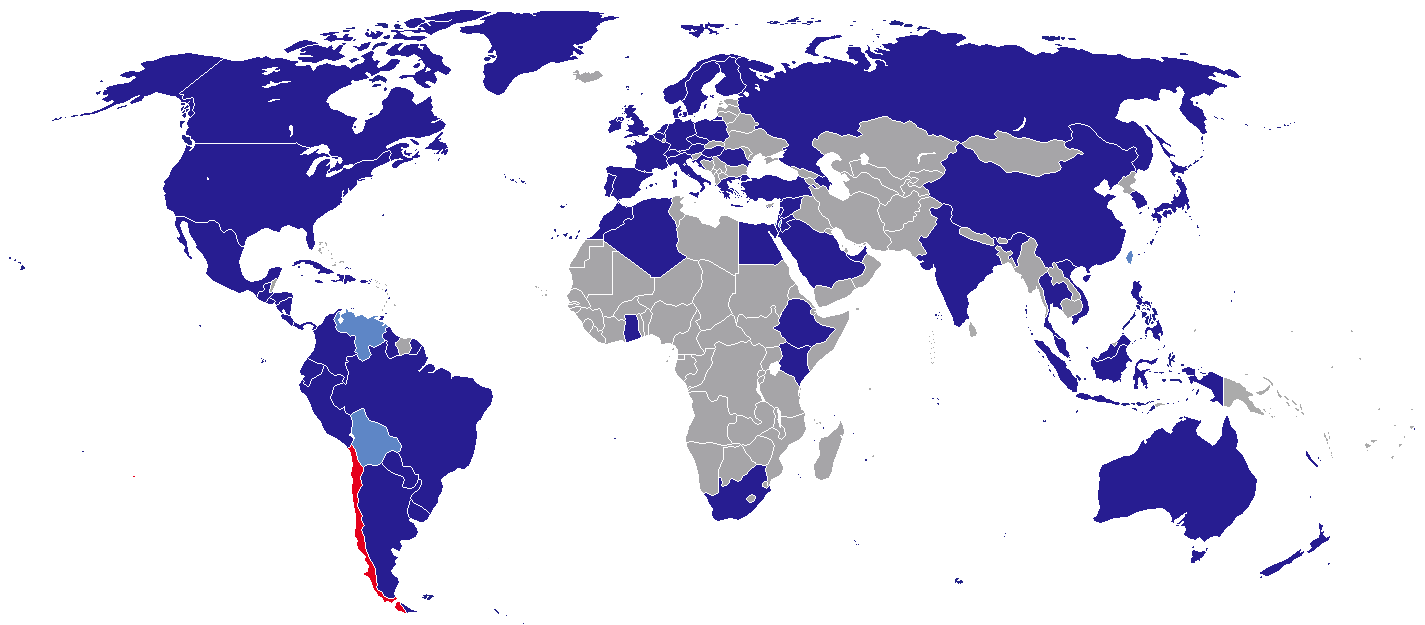
Chile Countries that host Chilean embassies Countries that host only Chilean consulates and missions that serve as de facto embassy

== Current missions ==
=== Africa ===
| Host country | Host city | Mission | Concurrent accreditation | Ref. |
|---|---|---|---|---|
| Algeria | Algiers | Embassy | Countries: Mauritania; Tunisia | |
| Egypt | Cairo | Embassy | Countries: Libya; Iraq; Oman; International Organizations: Arab League (Note: Accredited as an observer mission.) | |
| Ethiopia | Addis Ababa | Embassy | Countries: Djibouti; South Sudan; Multilateral Organizations: African Union | |
| Ghana | Accra | Embassy | Countries: Nigeria | |
| Kenya | Nairobi | Embassy | Countries: Rwanda; Tanzania; Uganda; International Organizations: United Nations; United Nations Environment Programme; United Nations Human Settlements Programme | |
| Morocco | Rabat | Embassy | Countries: Senegal | |
| South Africa | Pretoria | Embassy | Countries: Angola; Botswana; Eswatini; Lesotho; Malawi; Mauritius; Mozambique; Namibia; Seychelles; Zambia; Zimbabwe; International Organizations: Southern African Development Community | |

=== Americas ===
| Host country | Host city | Mission | Concurrent accreditation | Ref. |
|---|---|---|---|---|
| Argentina | Buenos Aires | Embassy | | |
| Argentina | Buenos Aires | Consulate-General | | |
| Argentina | Bariloche (Río Negro) | Consulate-General | | |
| Argentina | Córdoba (Córdoba) | Consulate-General | | |
| Argentina | Mendoza (Mendoza) | Consulate-General | | |
| Argentina | Neuquén (Neuquén) | Consulate-General | | |
| Argentina | Río Gallegos (Santa Cruz) | Consulate-General | | |
| Argentina | Rosario (Santa Fe) | Consulate-General | | |
| Argentina | Salta (Salta) | Consulate-General | | |
| Argentina | Bahía Blanca (Buenos Aires) | Consulate | | |
| Argentina | Comodoro Rivadavia (Chubut) | Consulate | | |
| Argentina | Mar del Plata (Buenos Aires) | Consulate | | |
| Argentina | Río Grande (Tierra del Fuego) | Consulate | | |
| Argentina | Ushuaia (Tierra del Fuego) | Consulate | | |
| Bolivia | La Paz | Consulate-General | | |
| Bolivia | Santa Cruz de la Sierra | Consulate-General | | |
| Brazil | Brasília | Embassy | | |
| Brazil | Porto Alegre | Consulate-General | | |
| Brazil | Rio de Janeiro | Consulate-General | | |
| Brazil | São Paulo | Consulate-General | | |
| Canada | Ottawa | Embassy | | |
| Canada | Montreal | Consulate General | | |
| Canada | Toronto | Consulate General | | |
| Canada | Vancouver | Consulate General | | |
| Colombia | Bogotá | Embassy | | |
| Costa Rica | San José | Embassy | | |
| Cuba | Havana | Embassy | | |
| Dominican Republic | Santo Domingo | Embassy | | |
| Ecuador | Quito | Embassy | | |
| Ecuador | Guayaquil | Consulate-General | | |
| El Salvador | San Salvador | Embassy | Countries: Belize | |
| Guatemala | Guatemala City | Embassy | | |
| Guyana | Georgetown | Embassy | | |
| Haiti | Port-au-Prince | Embassy | | |
| Honduras | Tegucigalpa | Embassy | | |
| Jamaica | Kingston | Embassy | Countries: Antigua and Barbuda; Bahamas; Dominica; Saint Kitts and Nevis; Saint Lucia | |
| Mexico | Mexico City | Embassy | | |
| Mexico | Mexico City | Consulate-General | | |
| Nicaragua | Managua | Embassy | | |
| Panama | Panama City | Embassy | | |
| Paraguay | Asunción | Embassy | | |
| Peru | Lima | Embassy | | |
| Peru | Lima | Consulate-General | | |
| Peru | Arequipa | Consulate-General | | |
| Peru | Tacna | Consulate-General | | |
| Trinidad and Tobago | Port of Spain | Embassy | Countries: Barbados; Grenada; Saint Vincent and the Grenadines; Suriname | |
| United States | Washington, D.C. | Embassy | | |
| United States | Chicago | Consulate-General | | |
| United States | Houston | Consulate-General | | |
| United States | Los Angeles | Consulate-General | | |
| United States | Miami | Consulate-General | | |
| United States | New York City | Consulate-General | | |
| United States | San Francisco | Consulate-General (Note: Created in 1850 to aid Chileans in the California gold rush.) | | |
| Uruguay | Montevideo | Embassy | International Organizations: ALADI; Mercosur | |
| Uruguay | Montevideo | Consulate-General | International Organizations: ALADI; Mercosur | |
| Venezuela | Caracas | Consulate-General | | |
| Venezuela | Puerto Ordaz | Consulate-General | | |

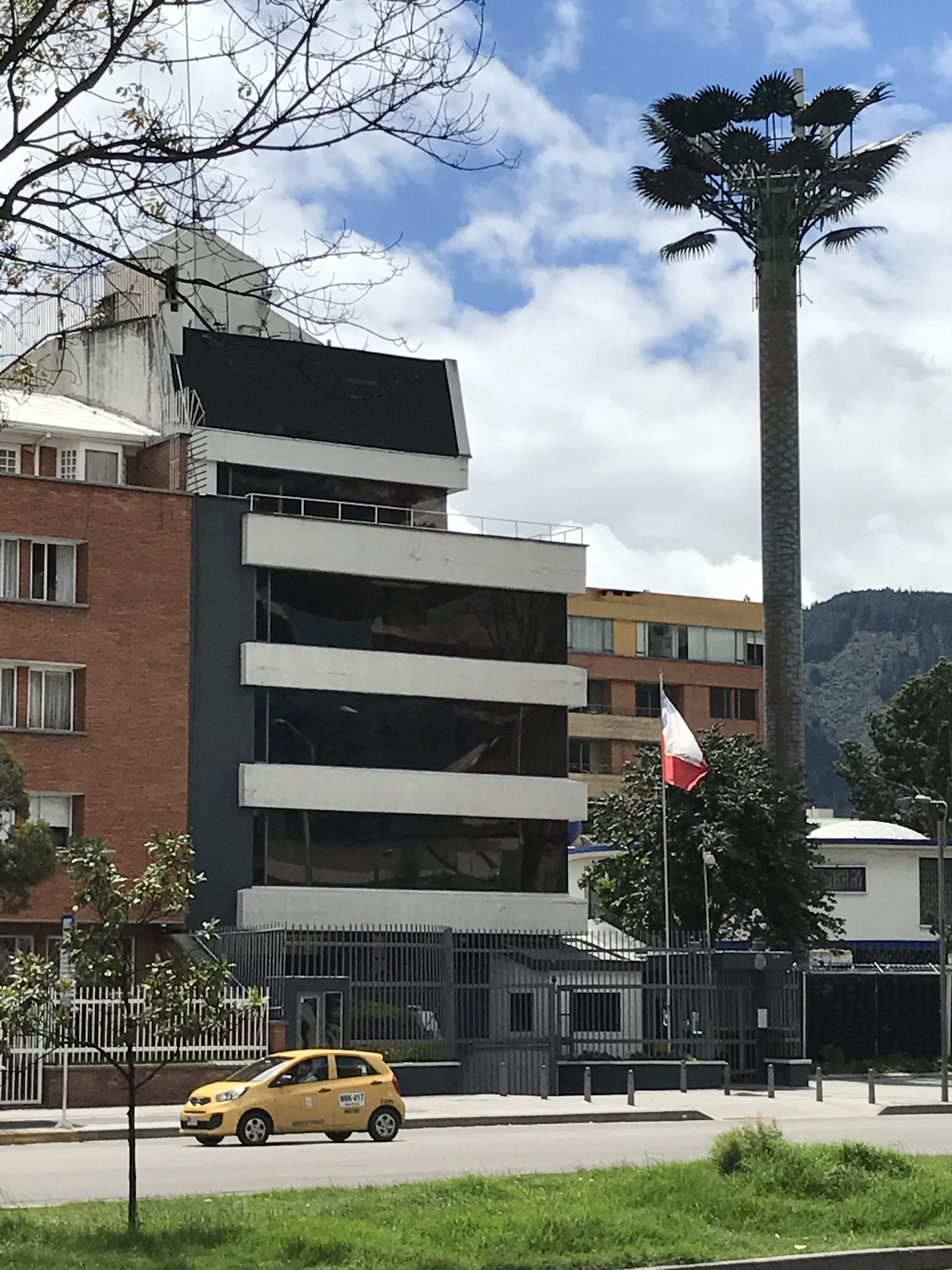
Embassy in Bogotá

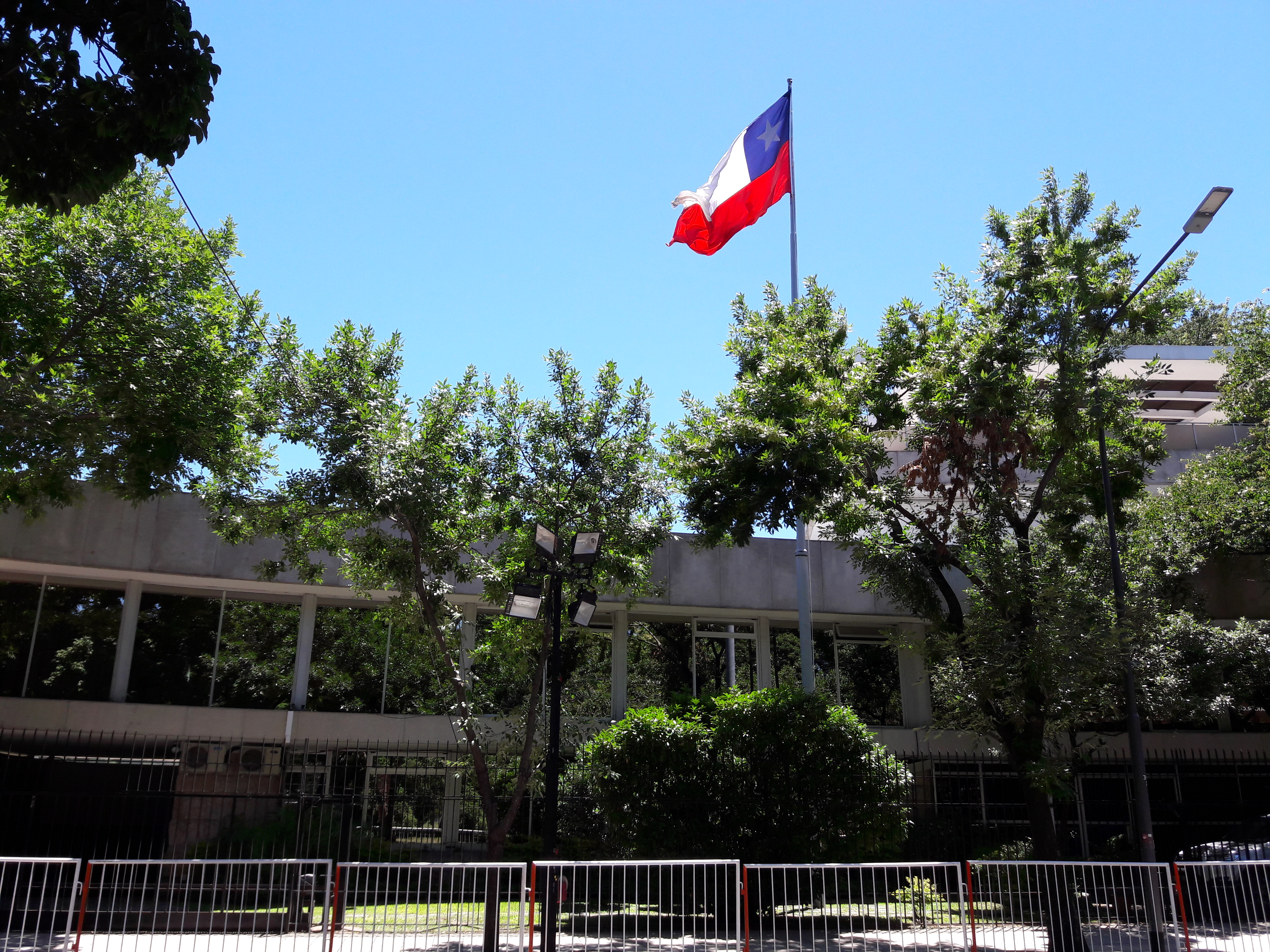
Embassy in Buenos Aires

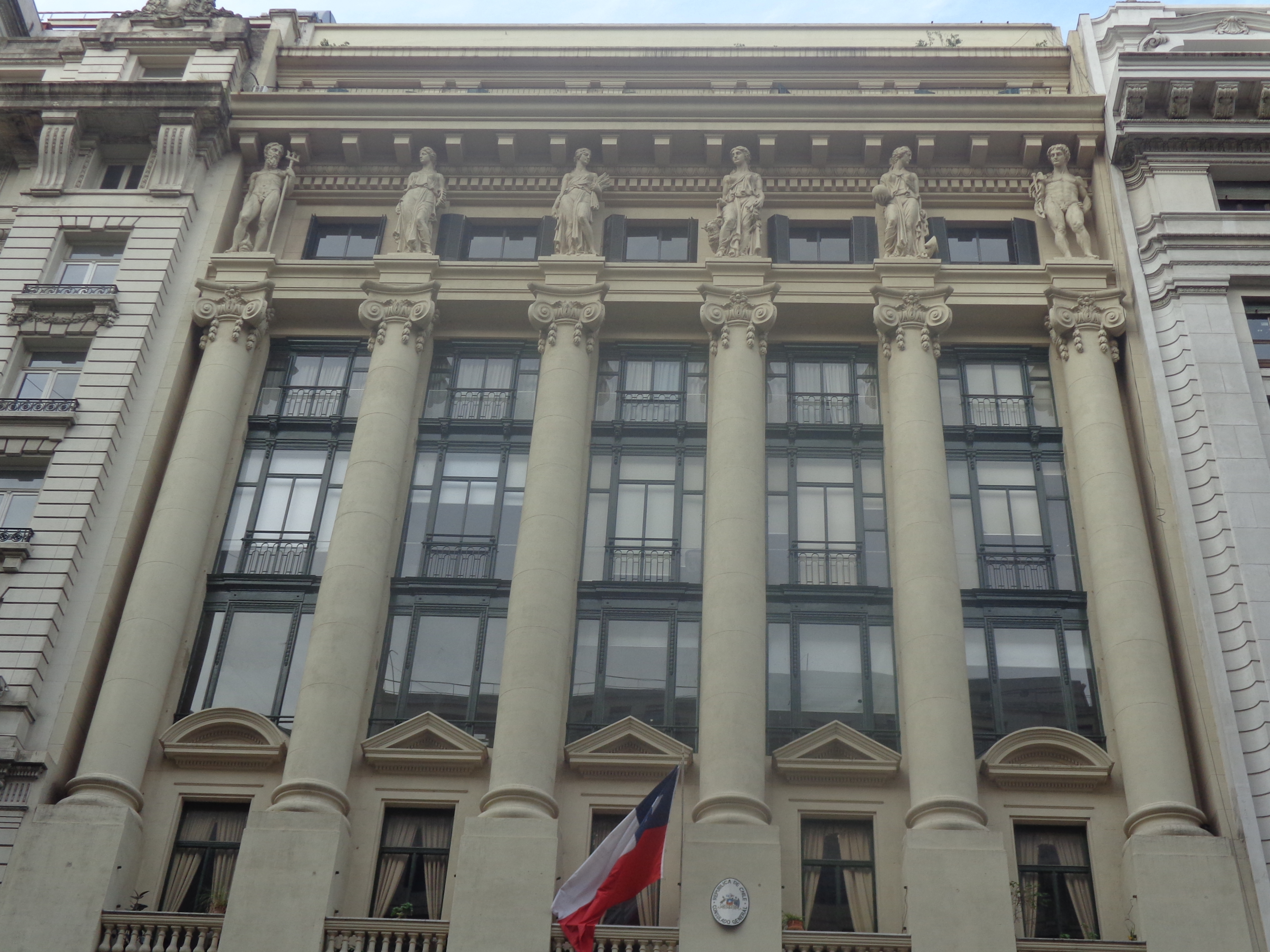
Consulate-General in Buenos Aires

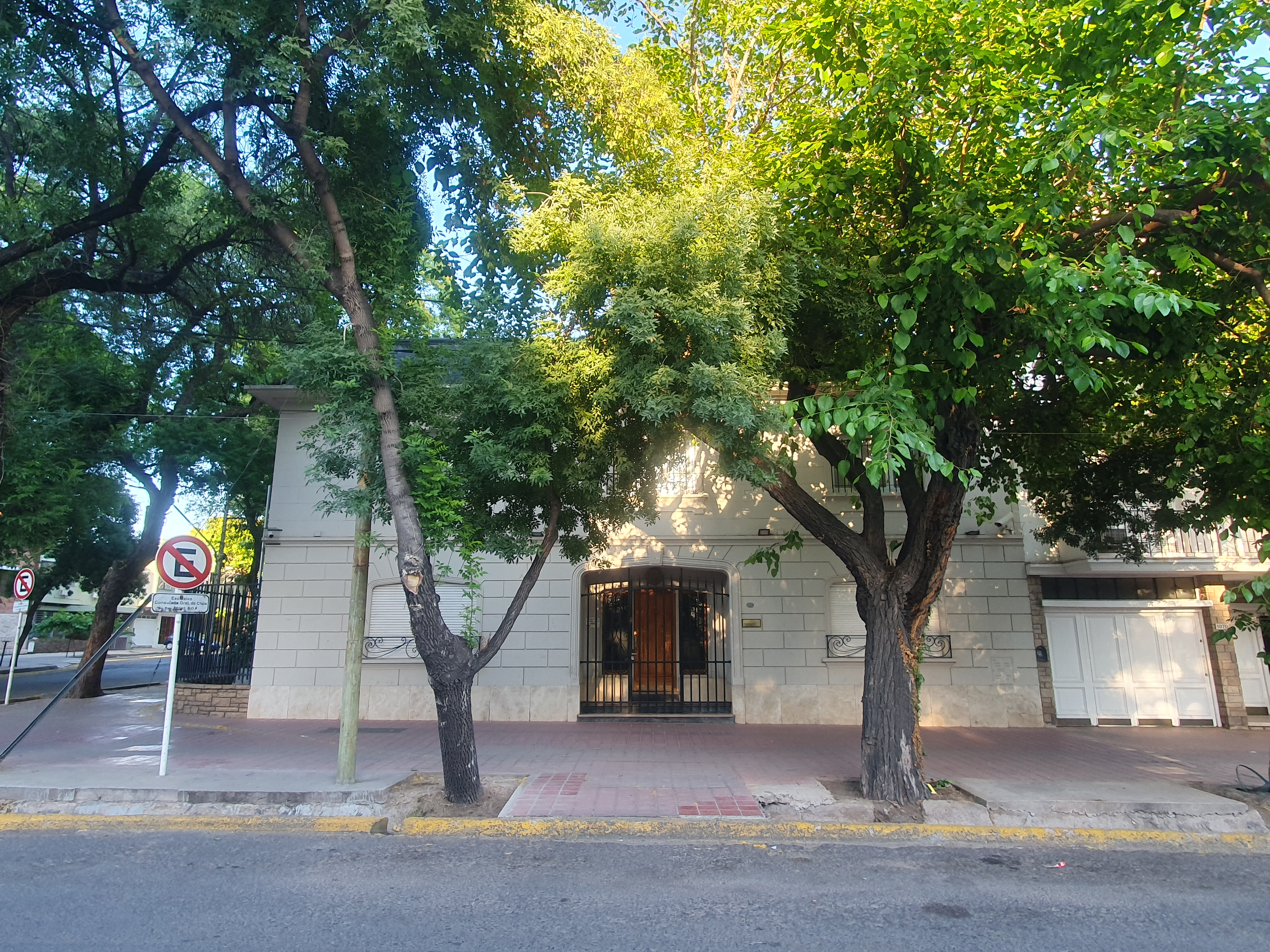
Consulate-General in Mendoza

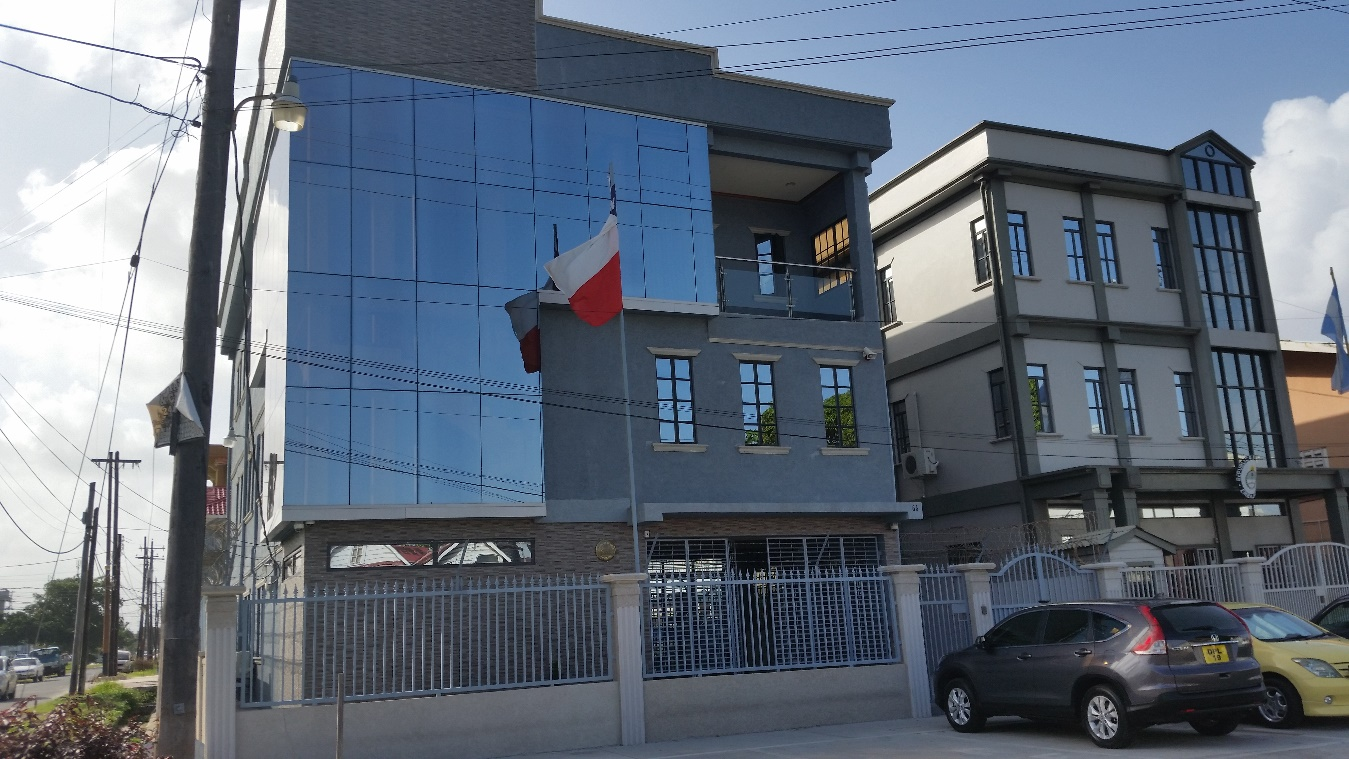
Embassy in Georgetown

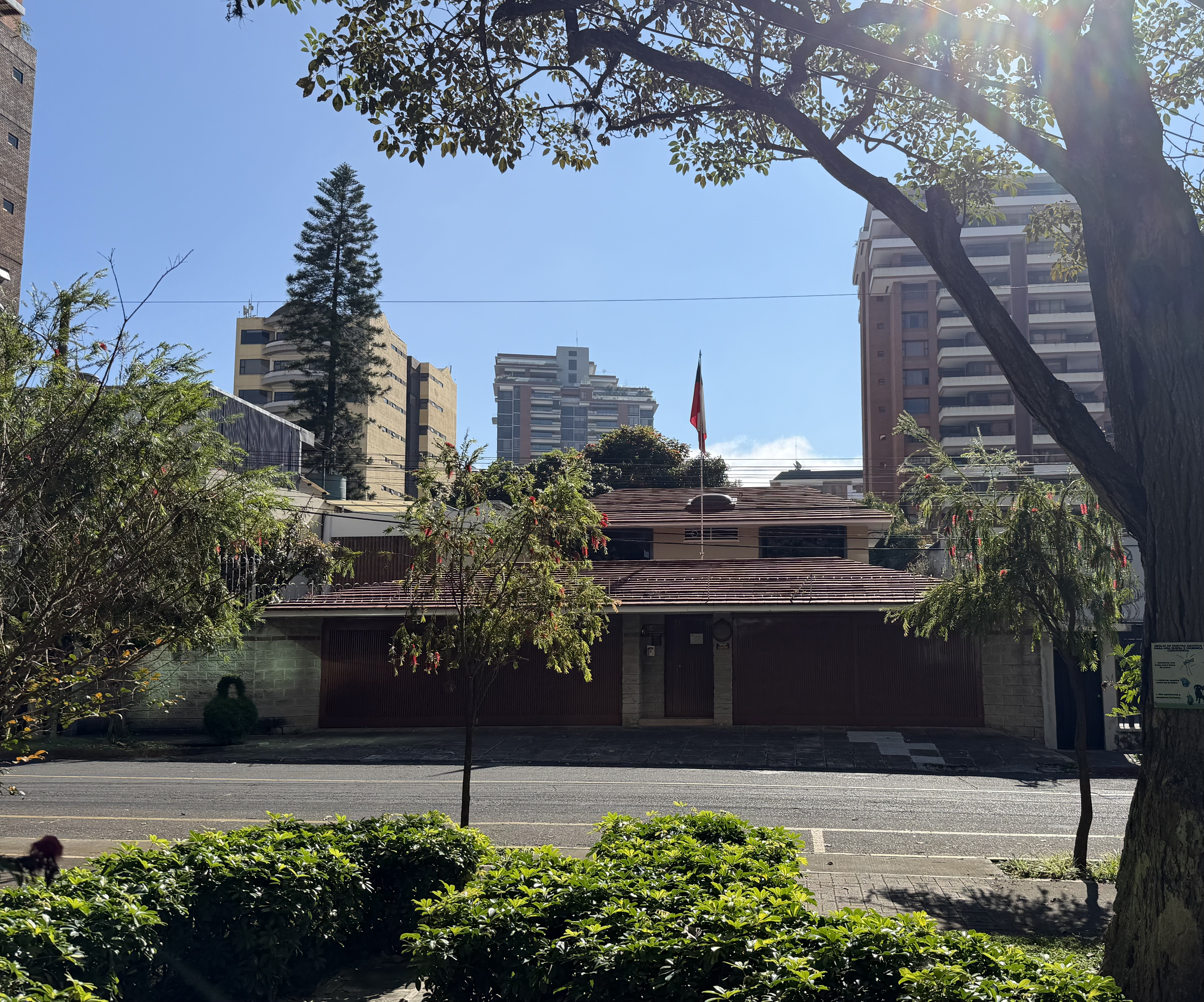
Embassy in Guatemala City

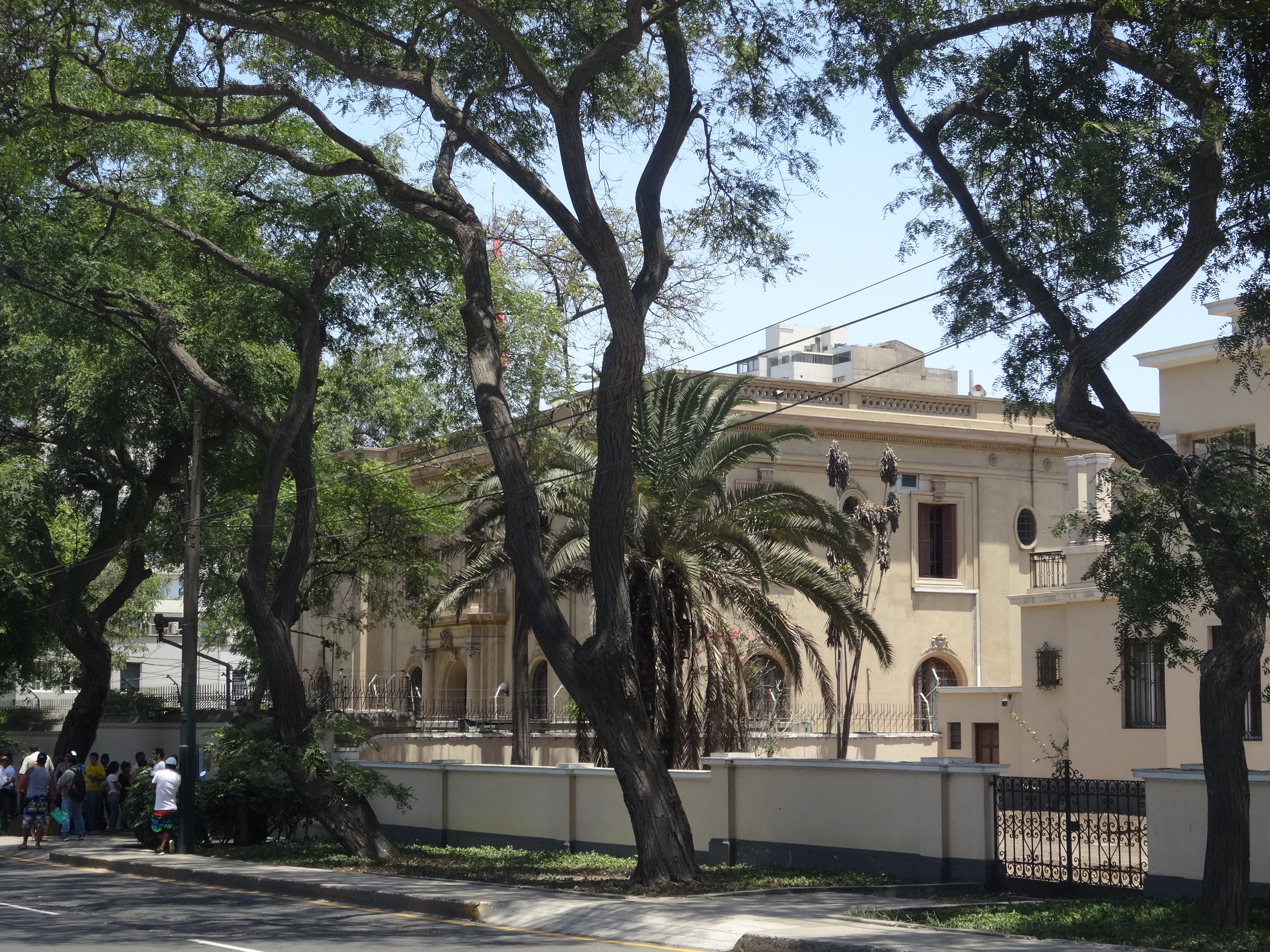
Embassy in Lima

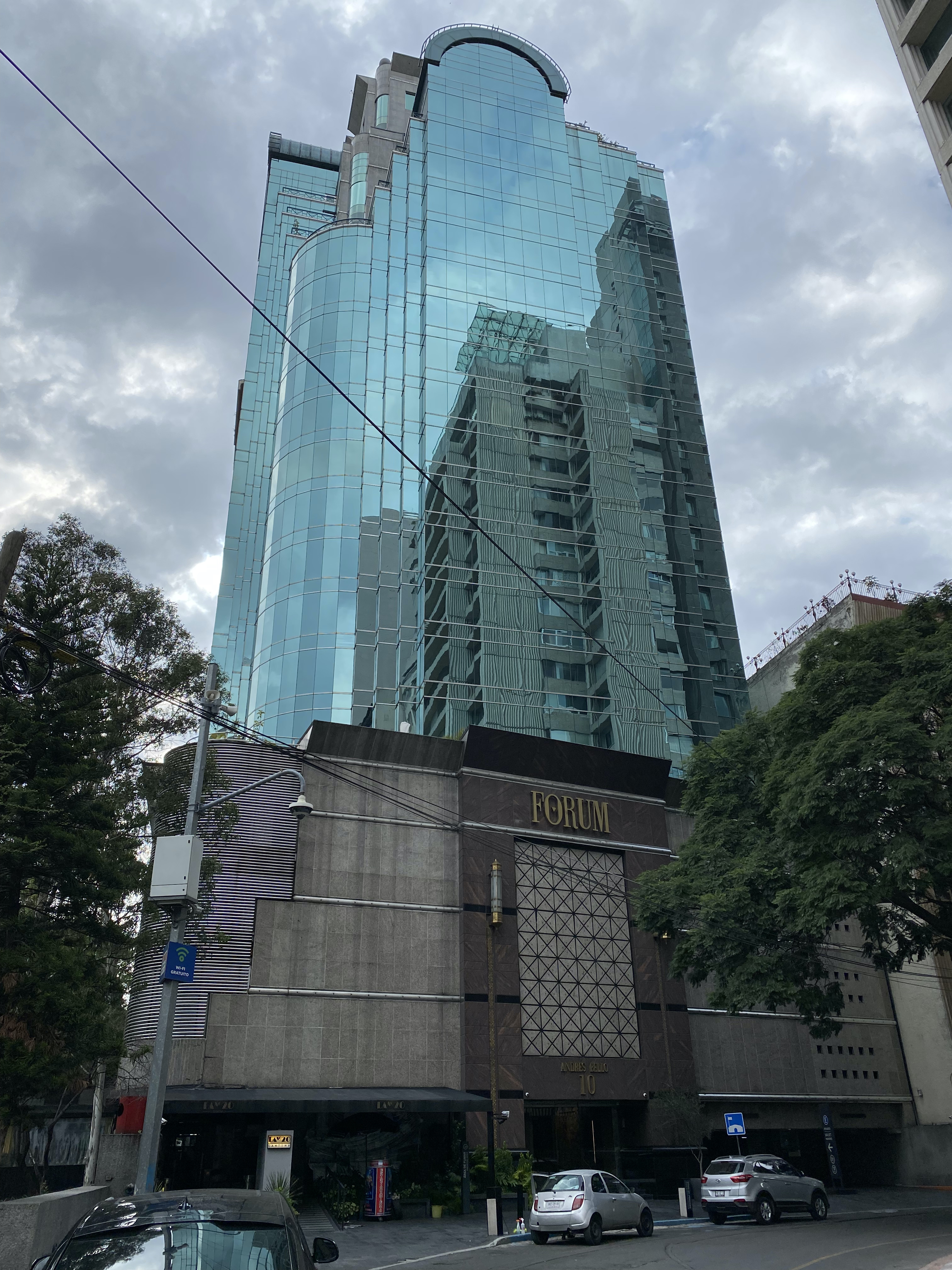
Building hosting the embassy in Mexico City

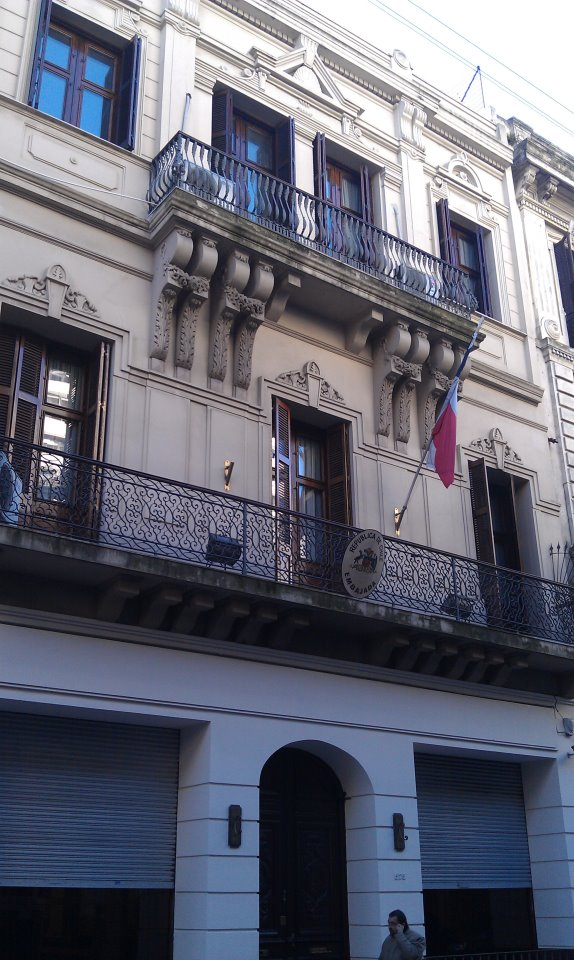
Embassy in Montevideo

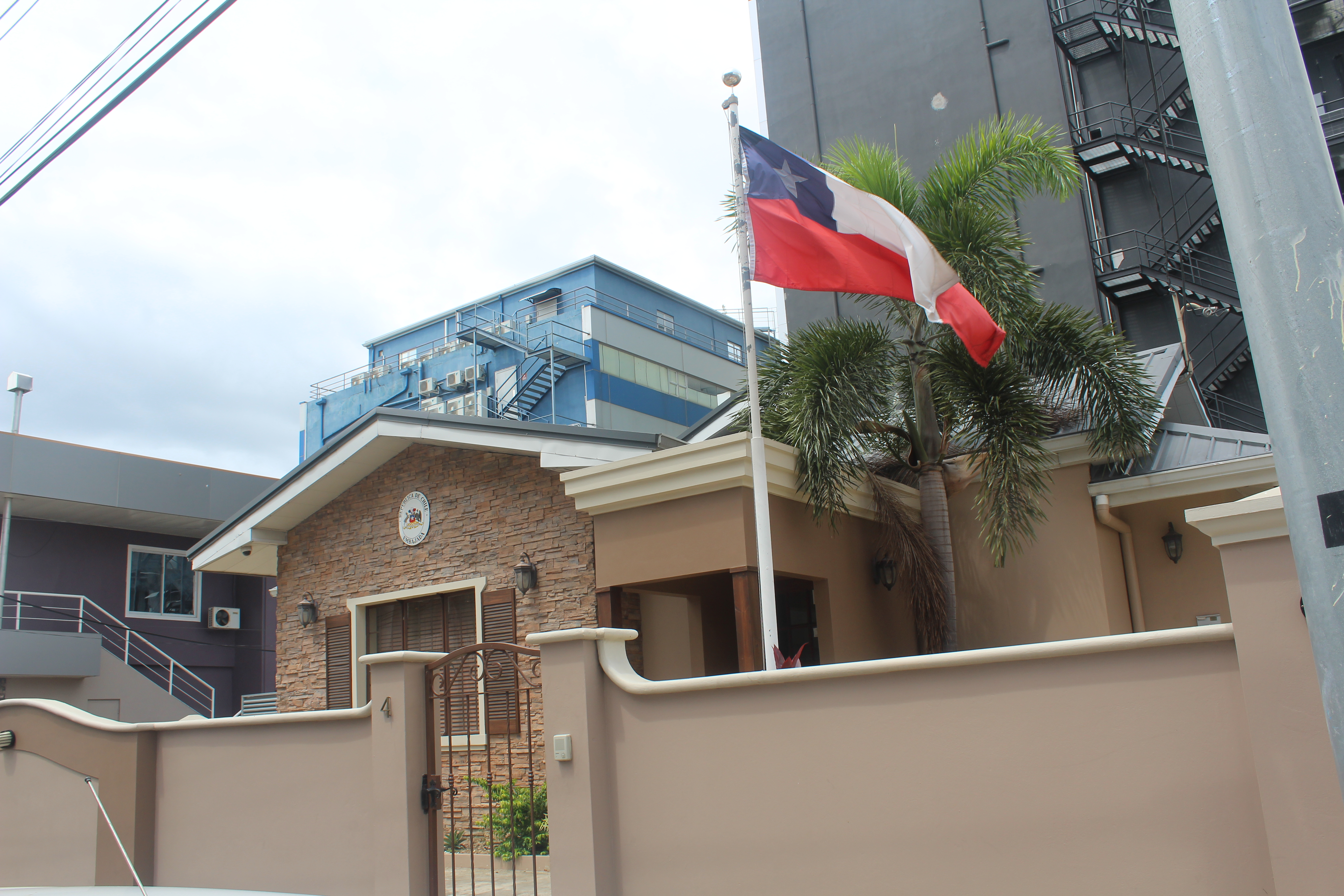
Embassy in Port of Spain

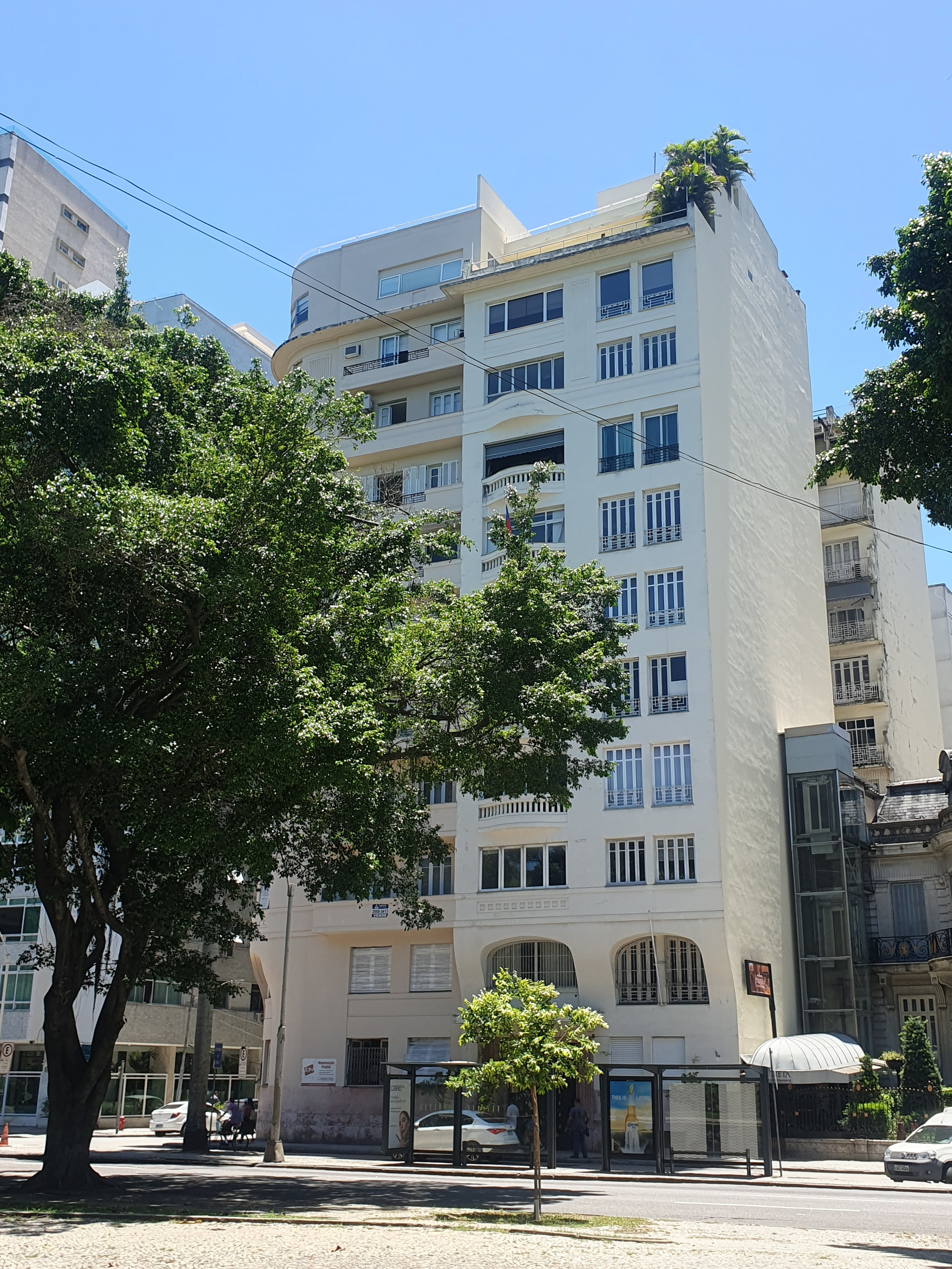
Building hosting the Consulate-General in Rio de Janeiro

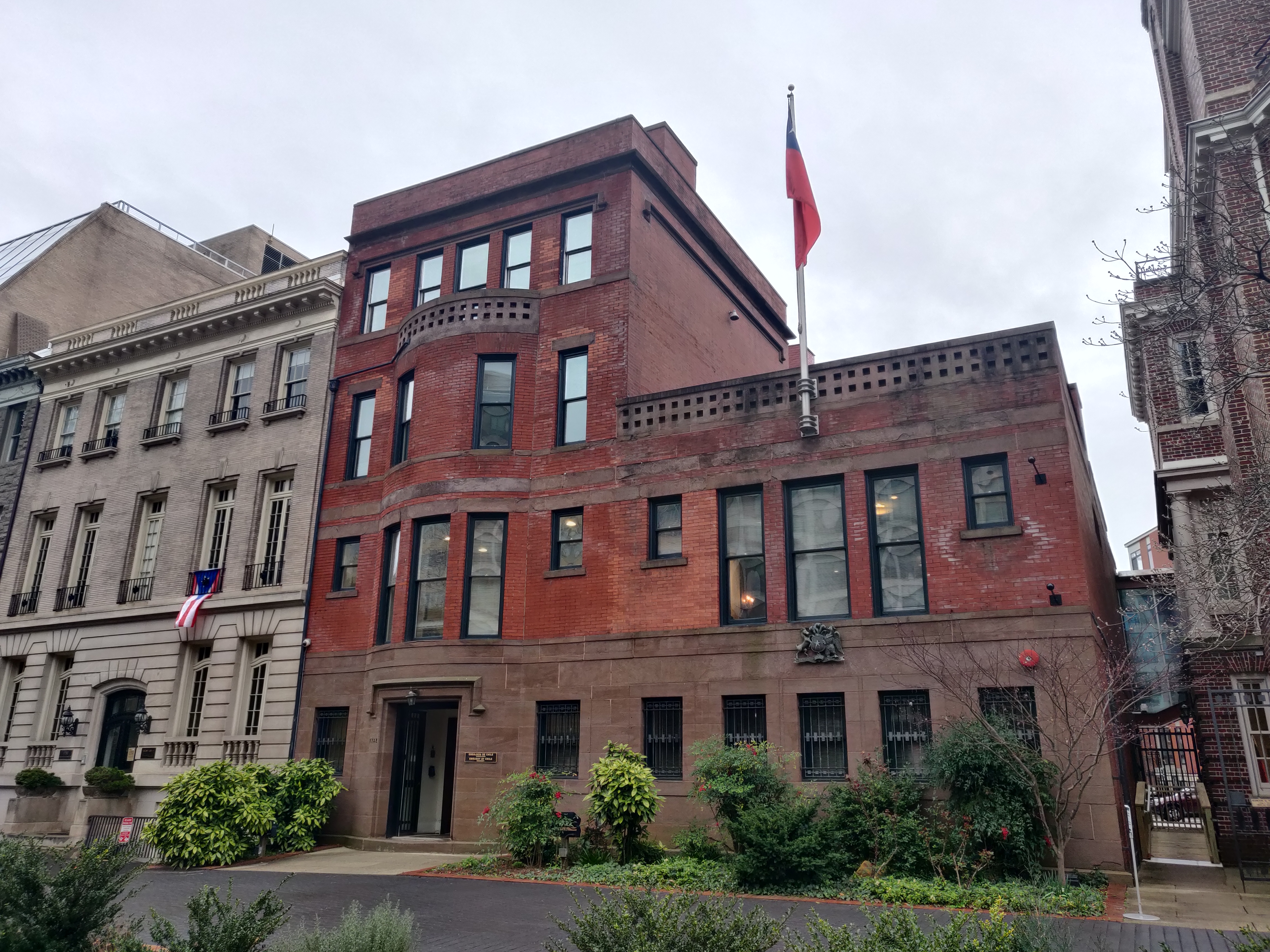
Embassy in Washington, D.C.

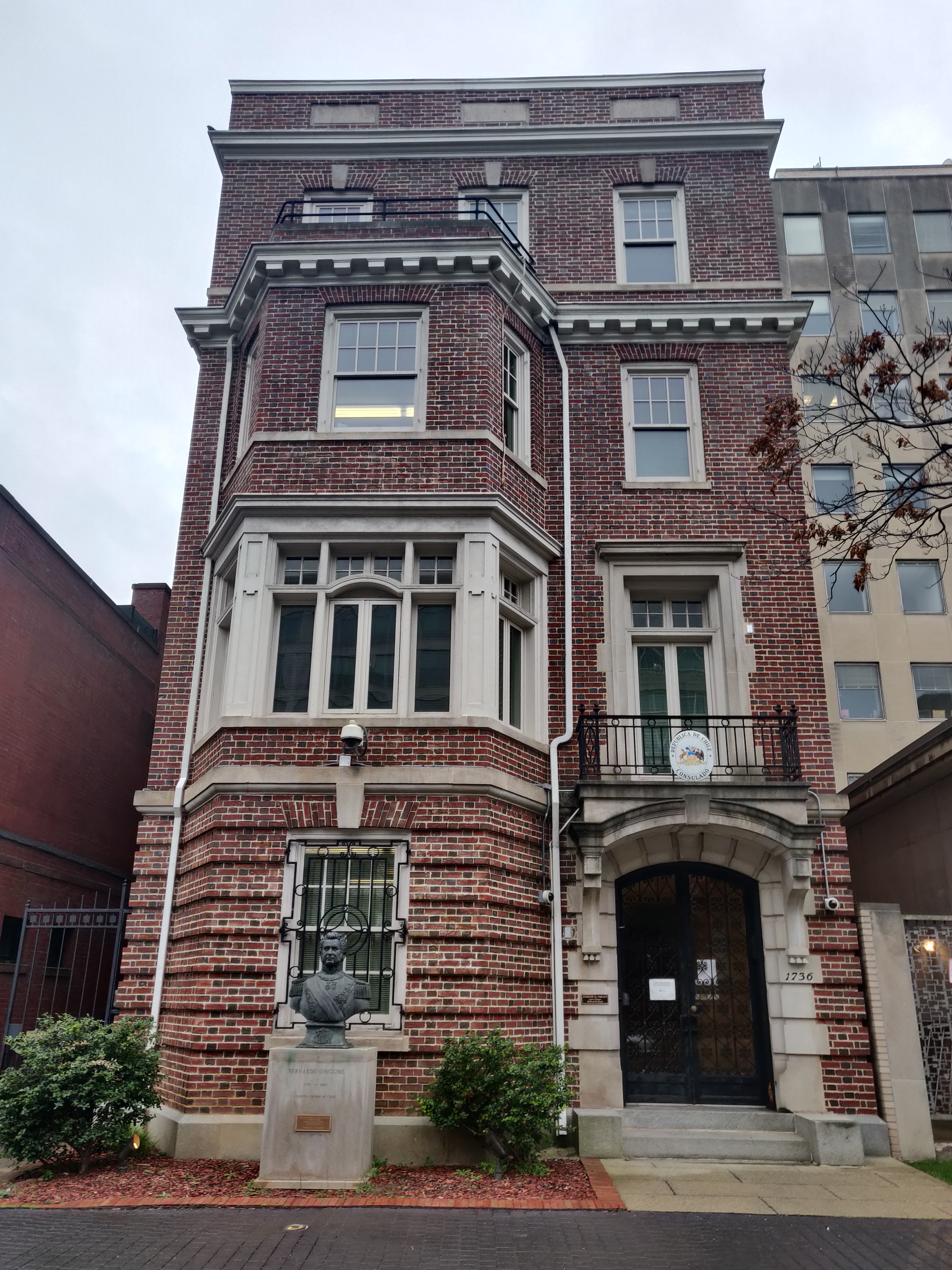
Embassy in Washington, D.C. (Consular Section)

=== Asia ===
| Host country | Host city | Mission | Concurrent accreditation | Ref. |
|---|---|---|---|---|
| Azerbaijan | Baku | Embassy | | |
| China | Beijing | Embassy | Countries: Mongolia | |
| China | Chengdu | Consulate-General | Countries: Mongolia | |
| China | Guangzhou | Consulate-General | Countries: Mongolia | |
| China | Hong Kong | Consulate-General | Countries: Mongolia | |
| China | Shanghai | Consulate-General | Countries: Mongolia | |
| India | New Delhi | Embassy | Countries: Bangladesh; Maldives; Nepal; Sri Lanka | |
| India | Mumbai | Consulate-General | Countries: Bangladesh; Maldives; Nepal; Sri Lanka | |
| Indonesia | Jakarta | Embassy | Countries: Timor-Leste; International Organizations: Association of Southeast Asian Nations | |
| Israel | Tel Aviv | Embassy | | |
| Japan | Tokyo | Embassy | | |
| Jordan | Amman | Embassy | | |
| Lebanon | Beirut | Embassy | | |
| Malaysia | Kuala Lumpur | Embassy | Countries: Brunei | |
| Palestine | Ramallah | Representative Office (Note: To be elevated into an embassy.) | | |
| Philippines | Manila | Embassy | Countries: Palau | |
| Saudi Arabia | Riyadh | Embassy | | |
| Singapore | Singapore | Embassy | | |
| South Korea | Seoul | Embassy | | |
| Syria | Damascus | Embassy | | |
| Taiwan | Taipei | Trade Office | | |
| Thailand | Bangkok | Embassy | Countries: Cambodia; Myanmar | |
| Turkey | Ankara | Embassy | Countries: Turkmenistan | |
| United Arab Emirates | Abu Dhabi | Embassy | Countries: Bahrain; Kuwait; Qatar | |
| Vietnam | Hanoi | Embassy | Countries: Laos | |

Building hosting the Embassy in Baku

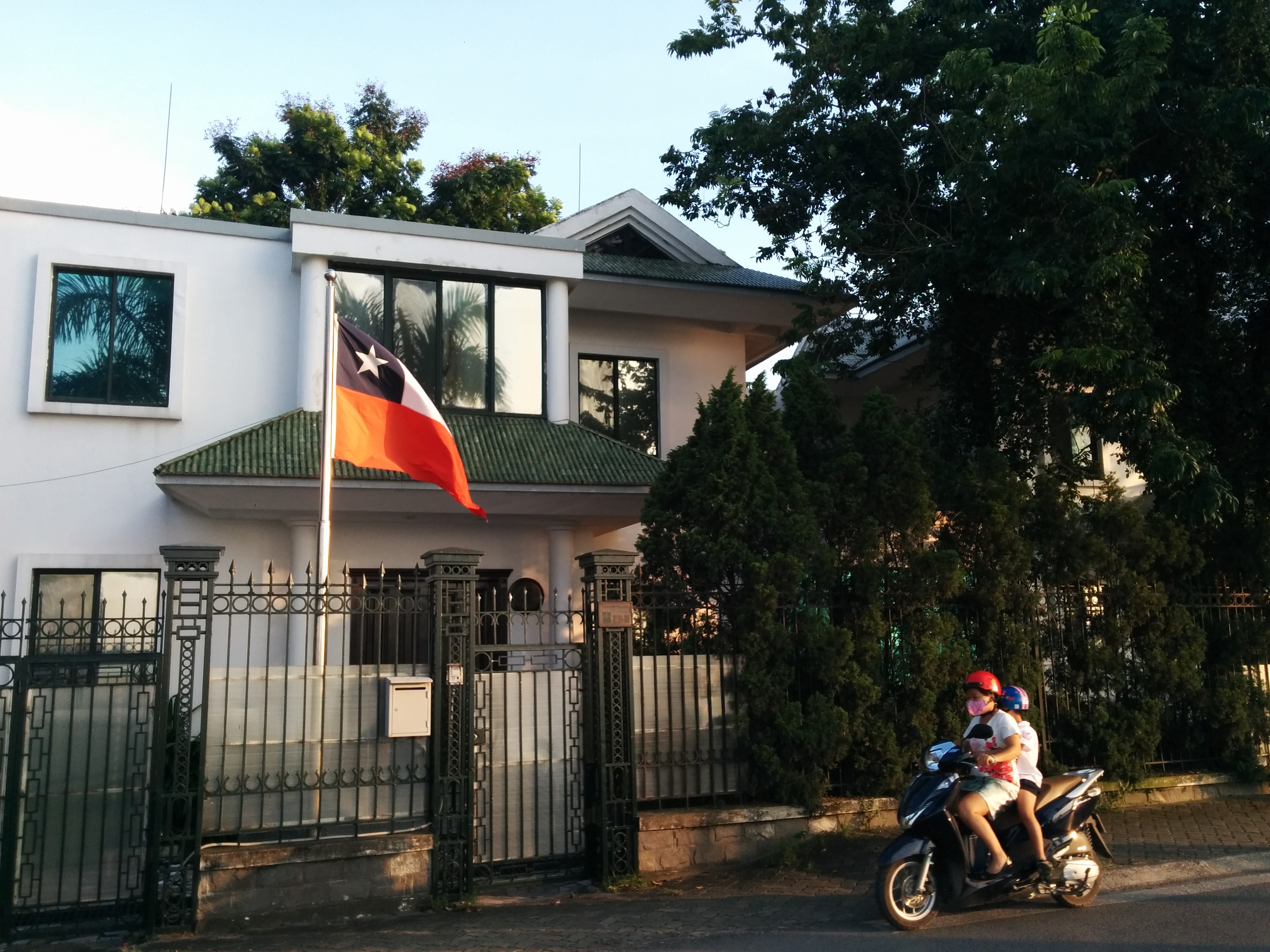
Embassy in Hanoi

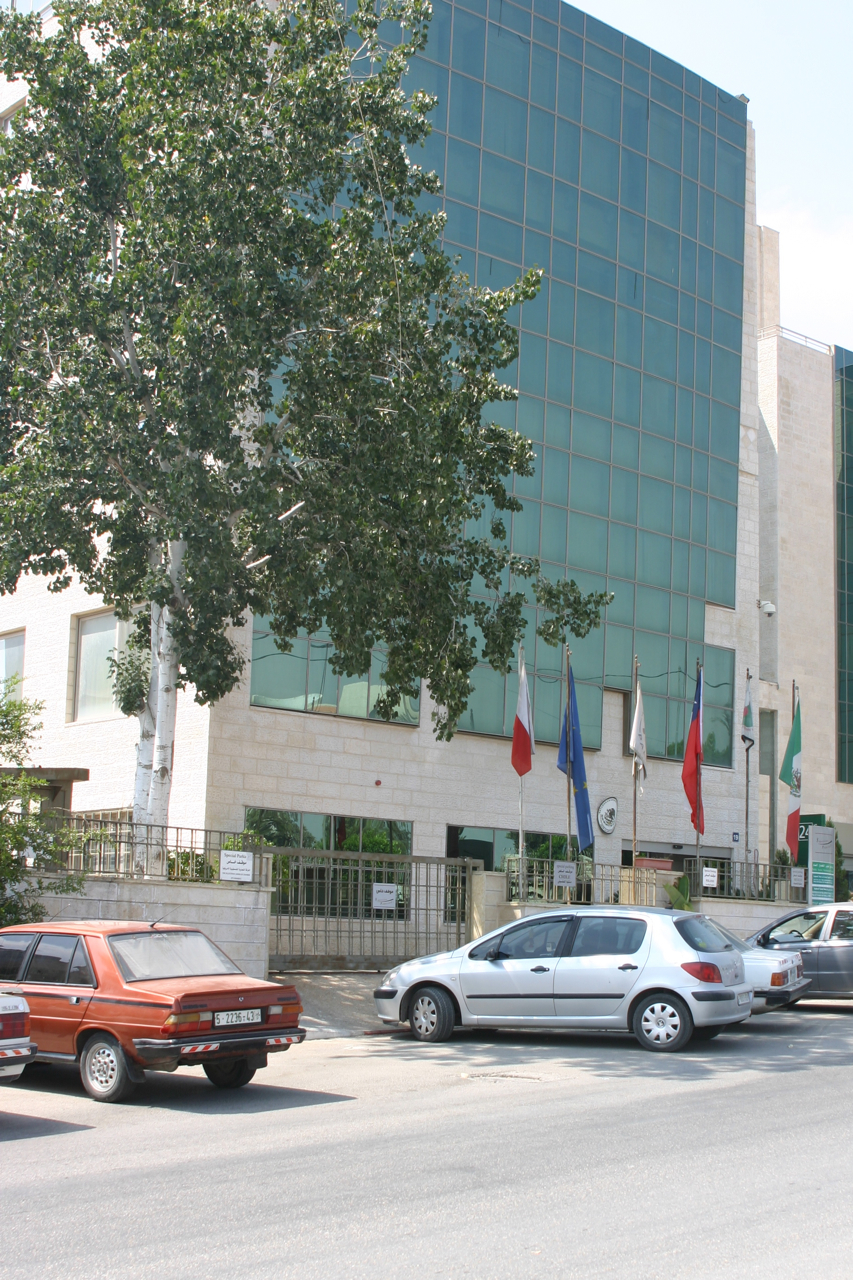
Building hosting the Representative Office in Ramallah

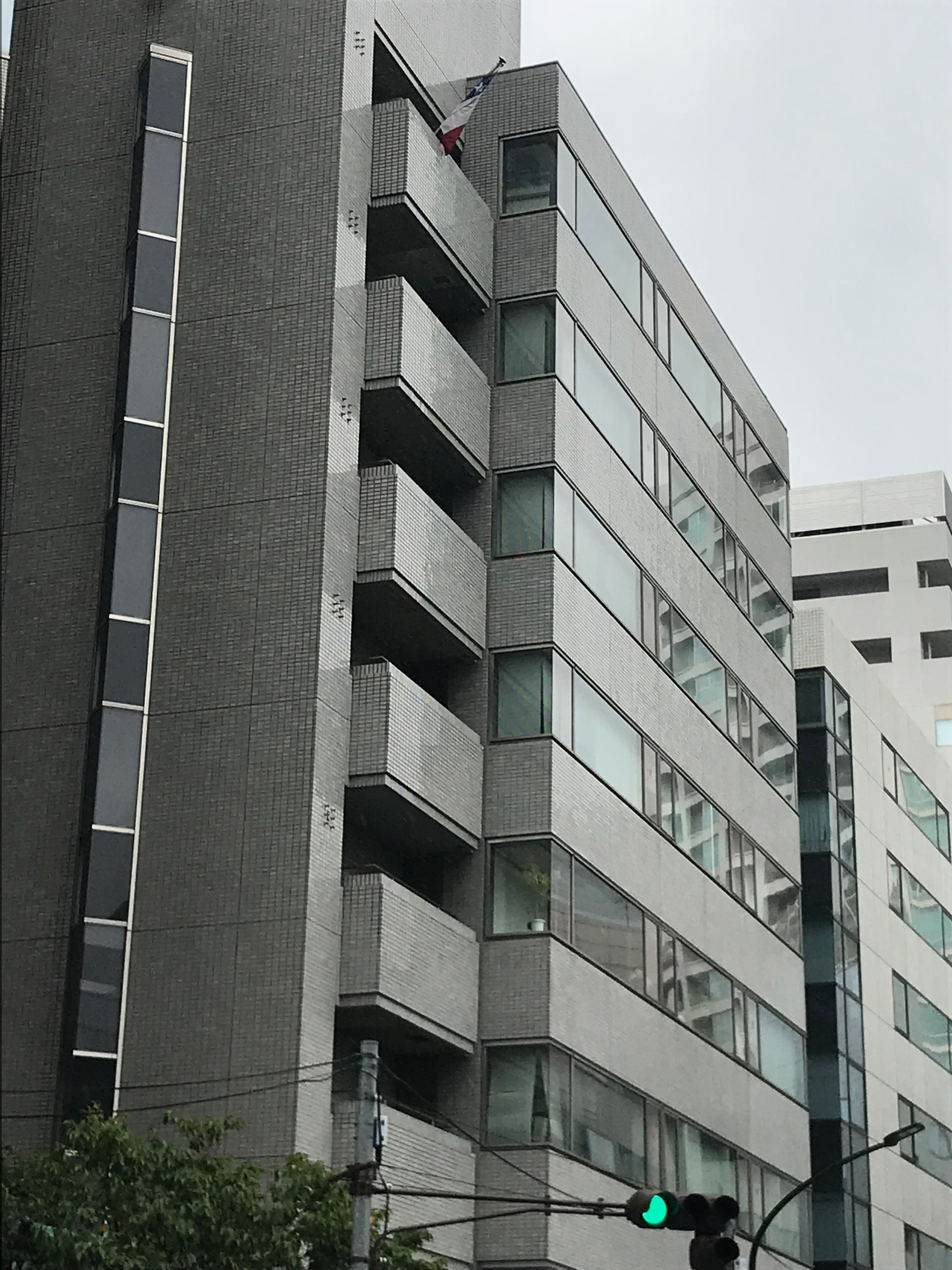
Building hosting the Embassy in Tokyo

=== Europe ===
| Host country | Host city | Mission | Concurrent accreditation | Ref. |
|---|---|---|---|---|
| Austria | Vienna | Embassy | Countries: Slovakia; Slovenia; Multilateral Organizations: United Nations; International Atomic Energy Agency; UNIDO; UNODC | |
| Belgium | Brussels | Embassy | Countries: Luxembourg; Multilateral Organizations: European Union | |
| Croatia | Zagreb | Embassy | Countries: Montenegro | |
| Czechia | Prague | Embassy | | |
| Denmark | Copenhagen | Embassy | | |
| Finland | Helsinki | Embassy | Countries: Estonia | |
| France | Paris | Embassy | Countries: Monaco; Multilateral Organizations: UNESCO | |
| France | Paris | Consulate-General | Countries: Monaco; Multilateral Organizations: UNESCO | |
| Germany | Berlin | Embassy | | |
| Germany | Frankfurt | Consulate-General | | |
| Germany | Hamburg | Consulate-General | | |
| Germany | Munich | Consulate-General | | |
| Greece | Athens | Embassy | Countries: Cyprus; Serbia | |
| Holy See (Note: The Chilean Embassy to the Holy See is located outside Vatican territory in Rome.) | Rome | Embassy | Countries: Albania; Sovereign entity: Sovereign Military Order of Malta | |
| Hungary | Budapest | Embassy | Countries: Bosnia and Herzegovina | |
| Ireland | Dublin | Embassy | | |
| Italy | Rome | Embassy | Countries: Malta; San Marino; Multilateral Organizations: Food and Agriculture Organization; International Fund for Agricultural Development; World Food Programme | |
| Italy | Milan | Consulate-General | Countries: Malta; San Marino; Multilateral Organizations: Food and Agriculture Organization; International Fund for Agricultural Development; World Food Programme | |
| Netherlands | The Hague | Embassy | Multilateral Organizations: OPCW | |
| Netherlands | Amsterdam | Consulate-General | Multilateral Organizations: OPCW | |
| Norway | Oslo | Embassy | Countries: Iceland | |
| Poland | Warsaw | Embassy | Countries: Georgia; Lithuania; Ukraine | |
| Portugal | Lisbon | Embassy | Countries: Cape Verde; São Tomé and Príncipe; Multilateral organizations: CPLP | |
| Romania | Bucharest | Embassy | Countries: Bulgaria; Moldova | |
| Russia | Moscow | Embassy | Countries: Armenia; Belarus; Kazakhstan; Kyrgyzstan; Tajikistan; Uzbekistan | |
| Spain | Madrid | Embassy | Countries: Andorra | |
| Spain | Madrid | Consulate-General | Countries: Andorra | |
| Spain | Barcelona | Consulate-General | Countries: Andorra | |
| Sweden | Stockholm | Embassy | Countries: Latvia | |
| Sweden | Gothenburg | Consulate-General | Countries: Latvia | |
| Switzerland | Bern | Embassy | Countries: Liechtenstein | |
| United Kingdom | London | Embassy | Multilateral Organizations: International Maritime Organization | |

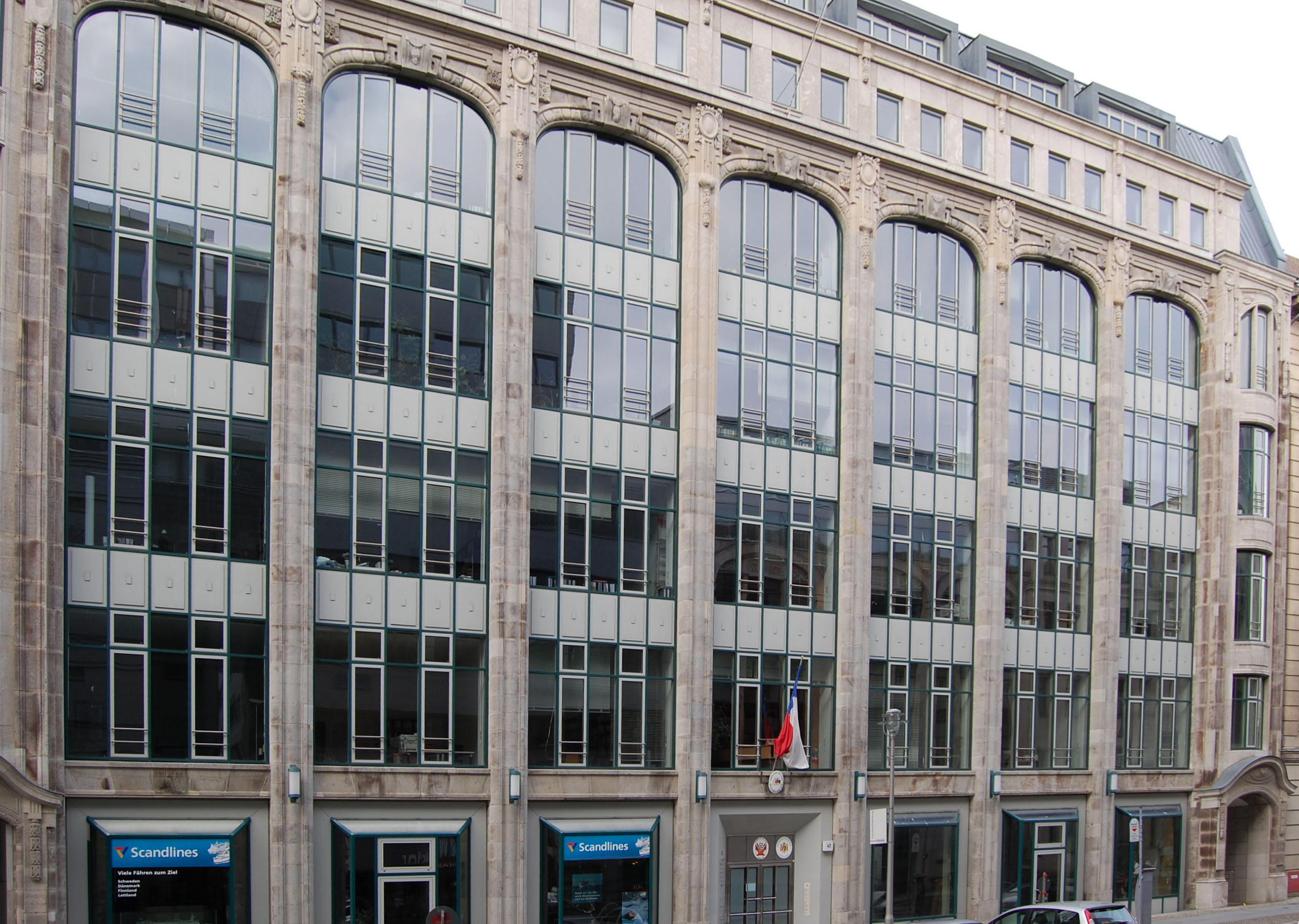
Building hosting the Embassy in Berlin

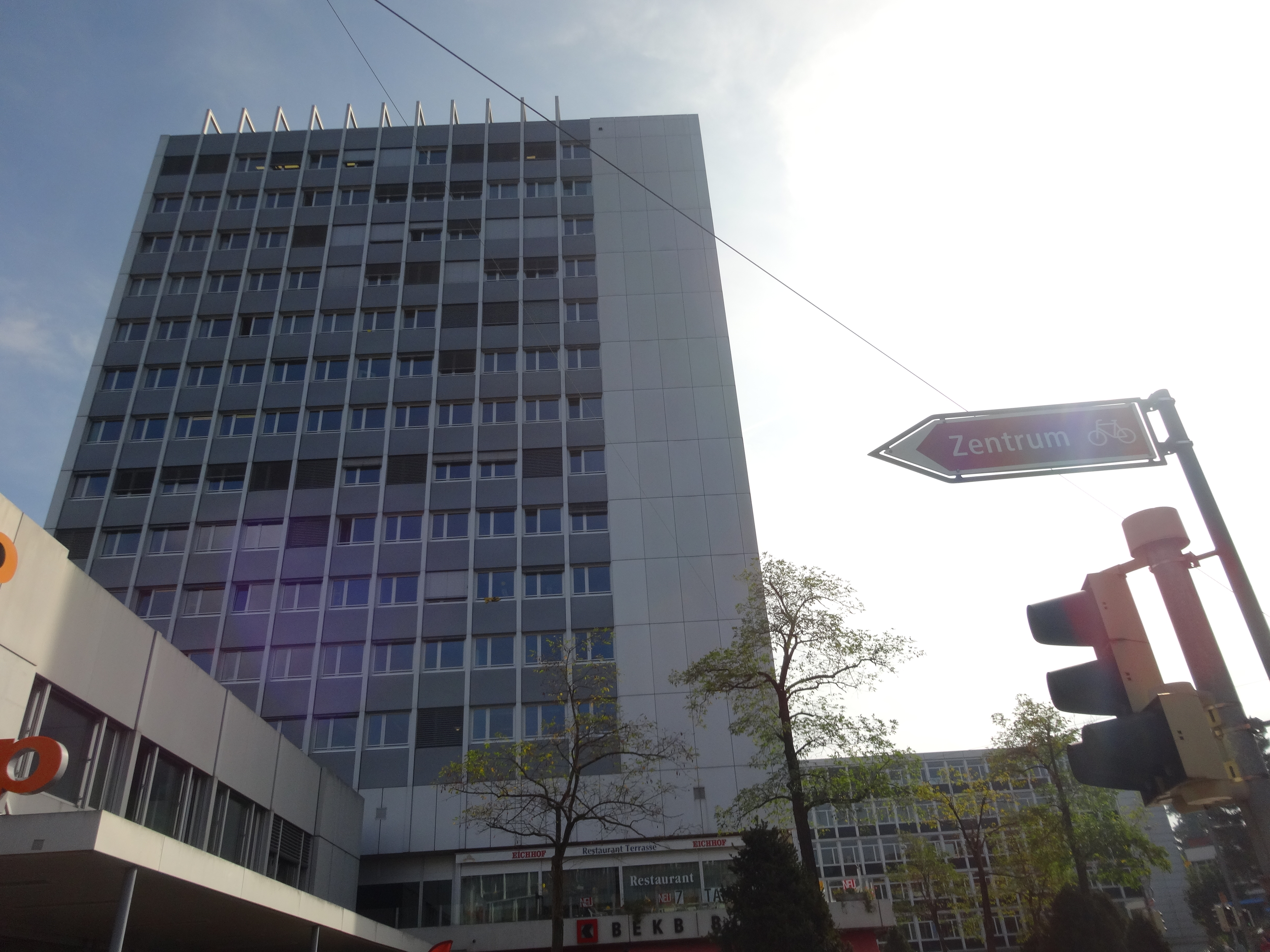
Embassy in Bern

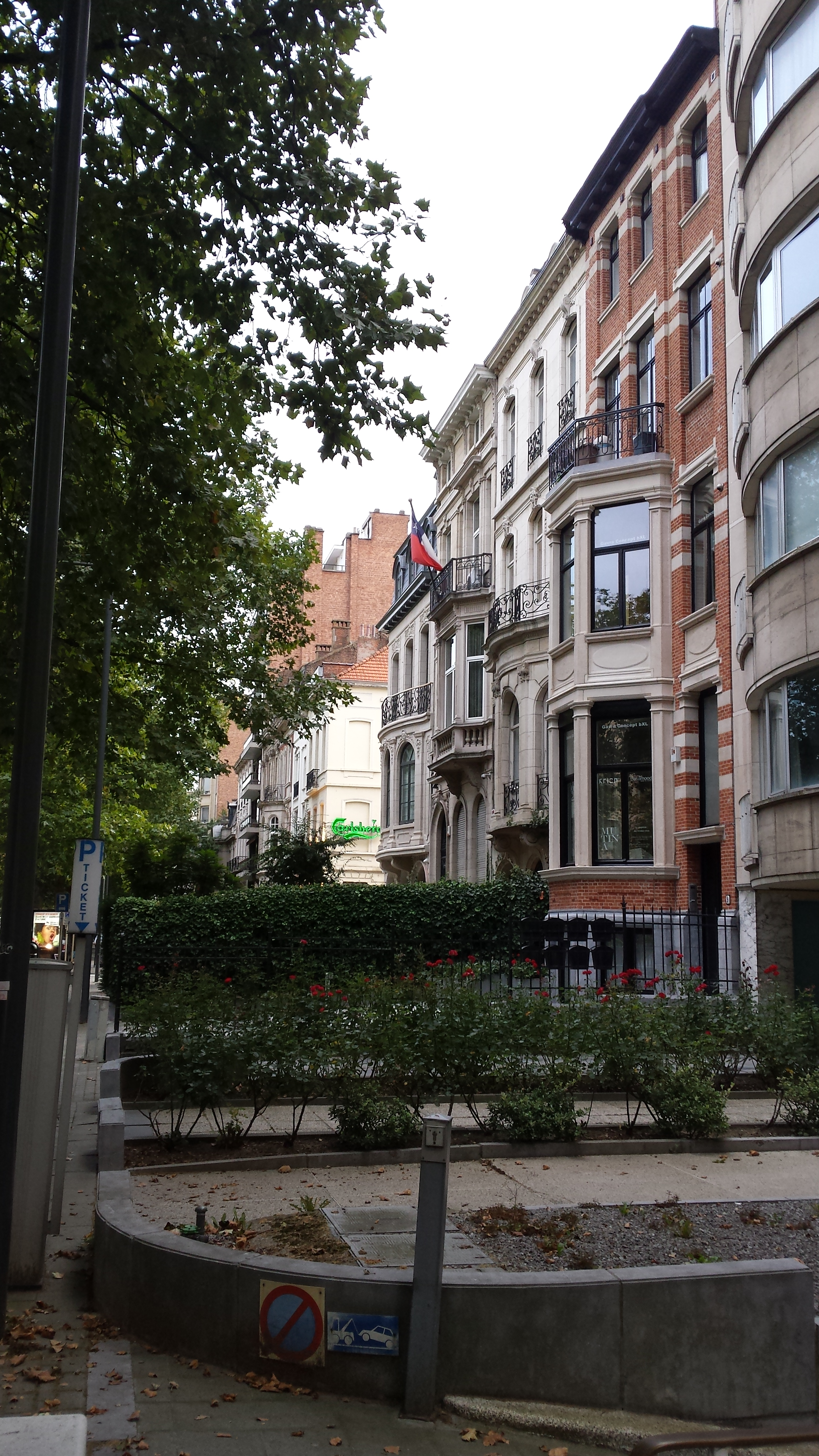
Embassy in Brussels

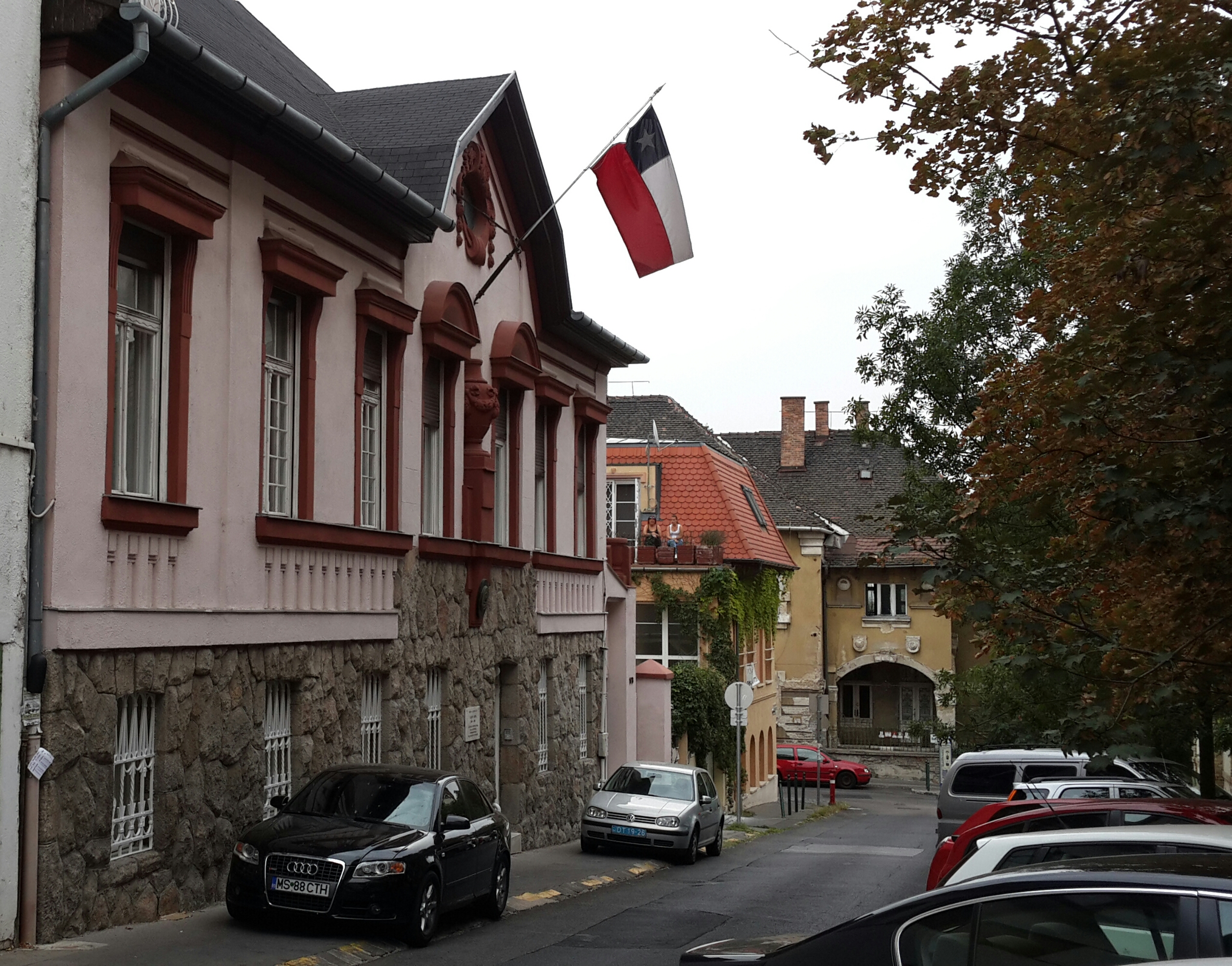
Embassy in Budapest

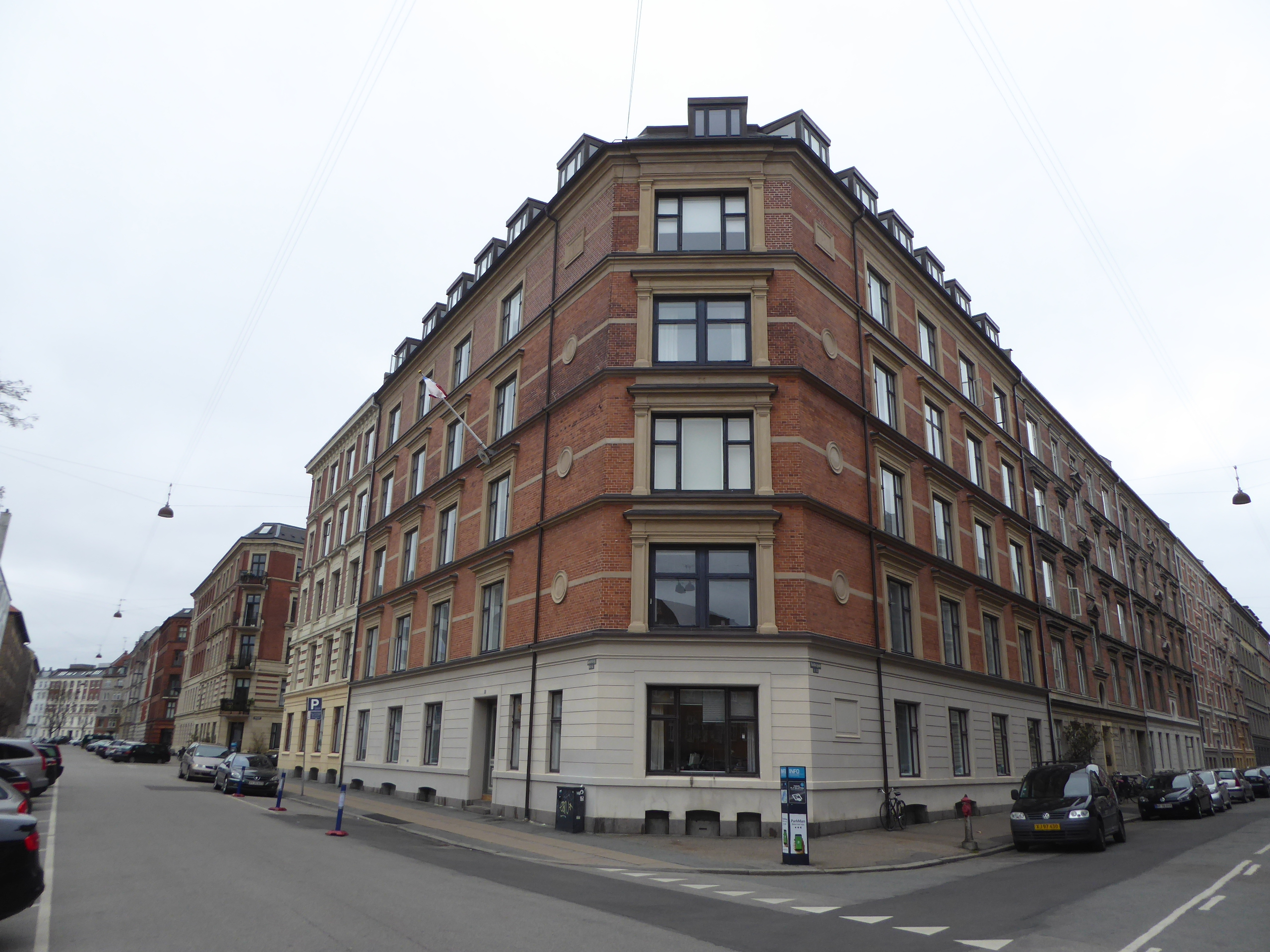
Embassy in Copenhagen

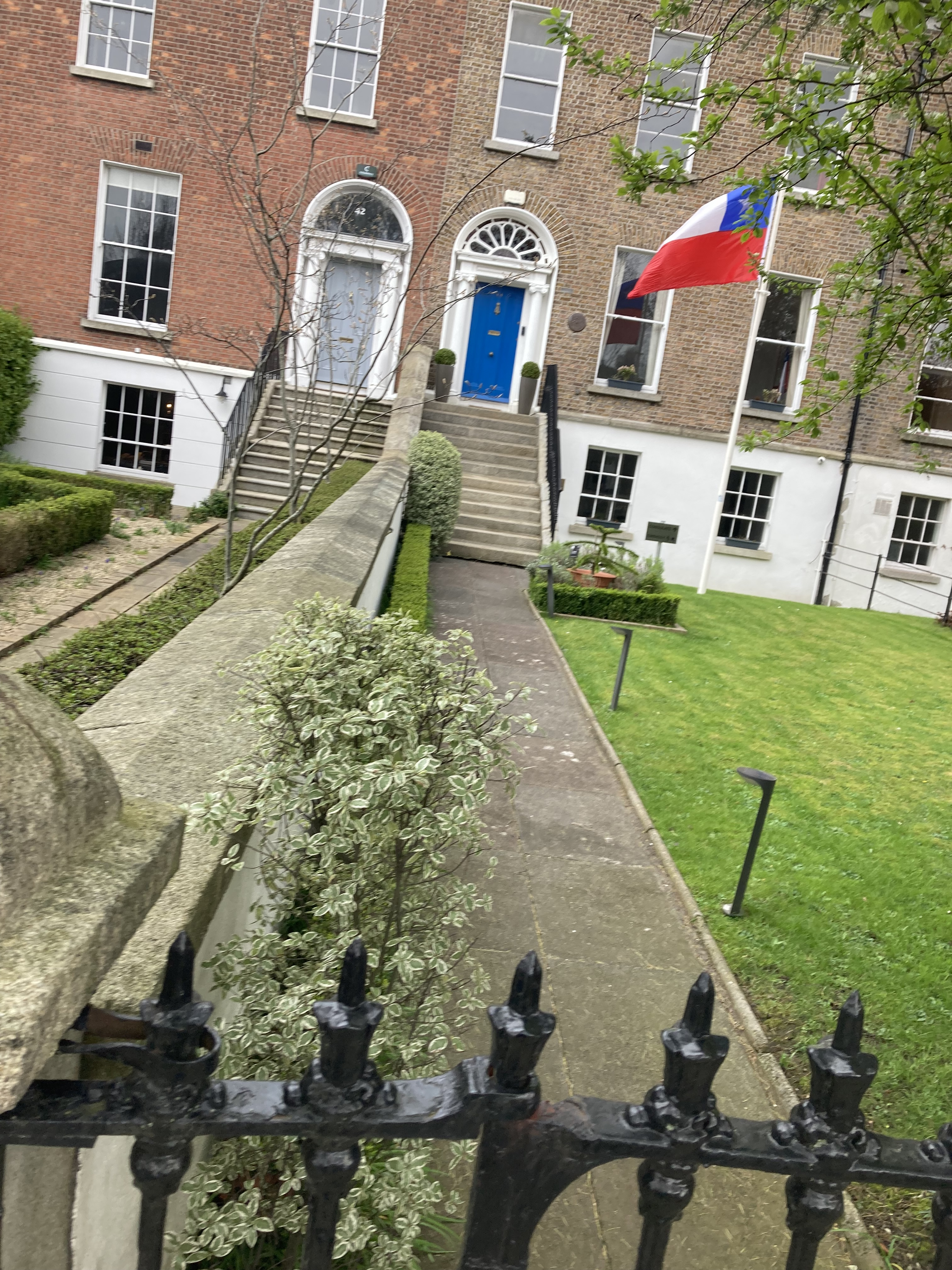
Embassy in Dublin

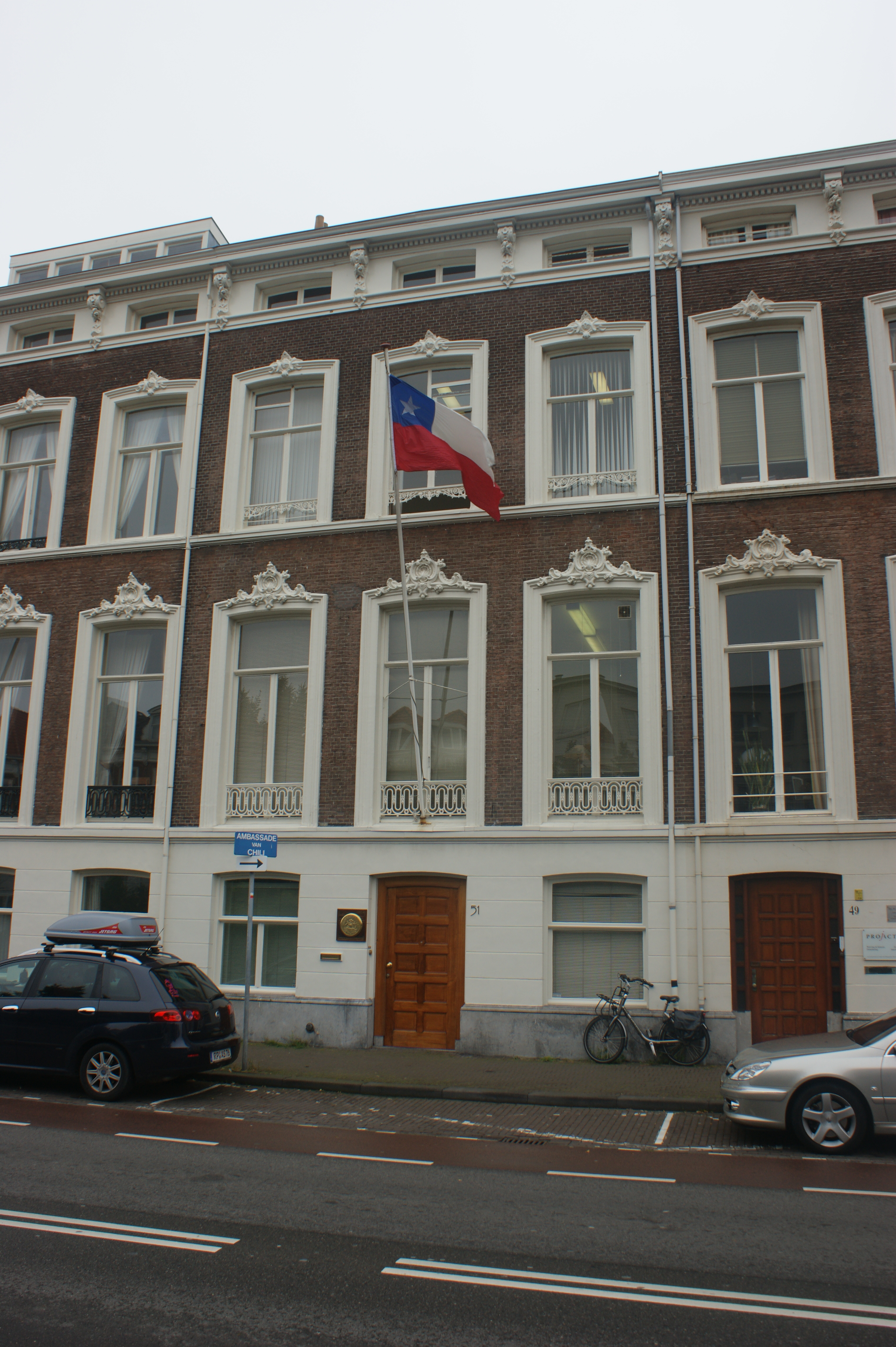
Embassy in The Hague

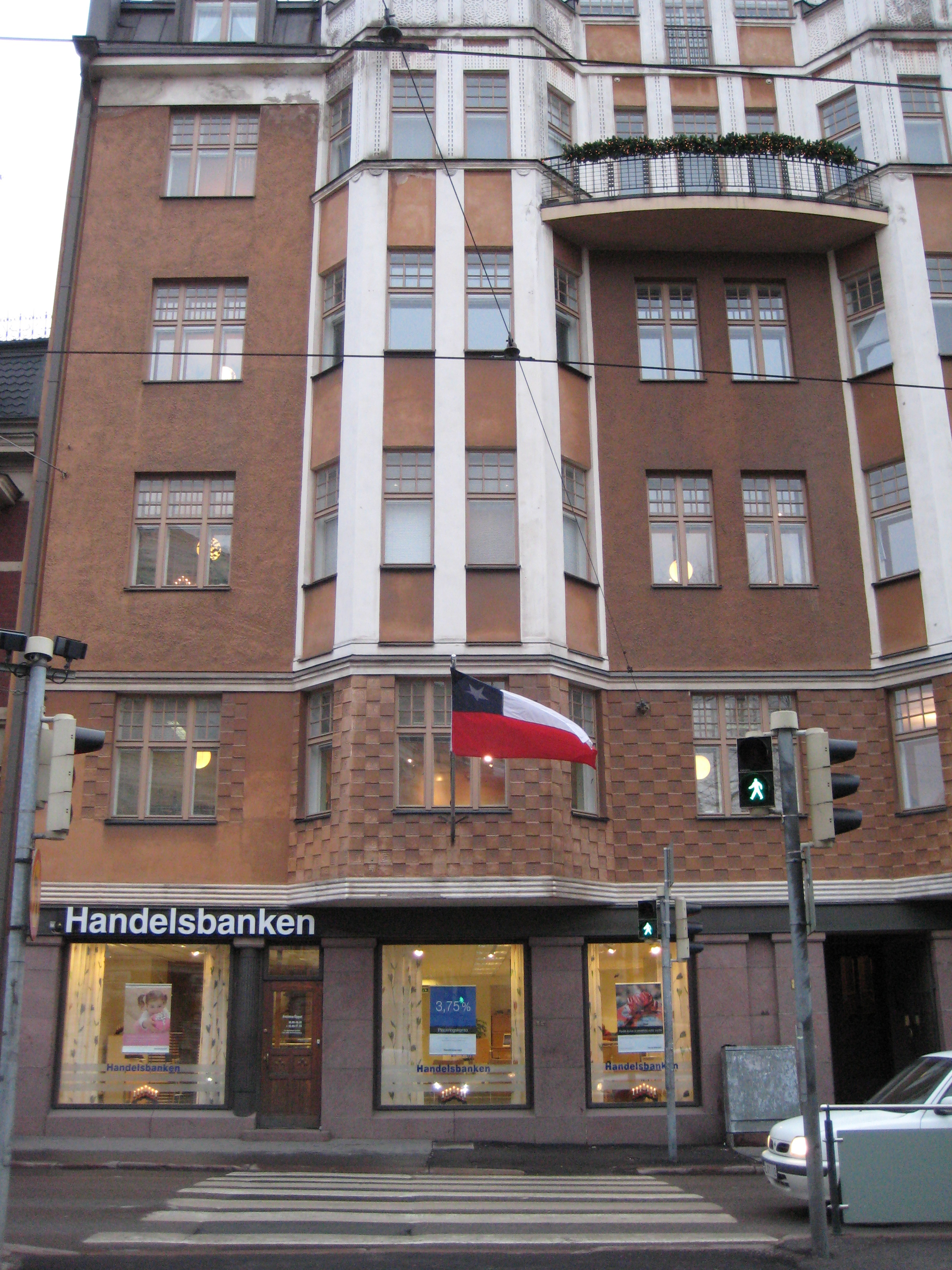
Embassy in Helsinki

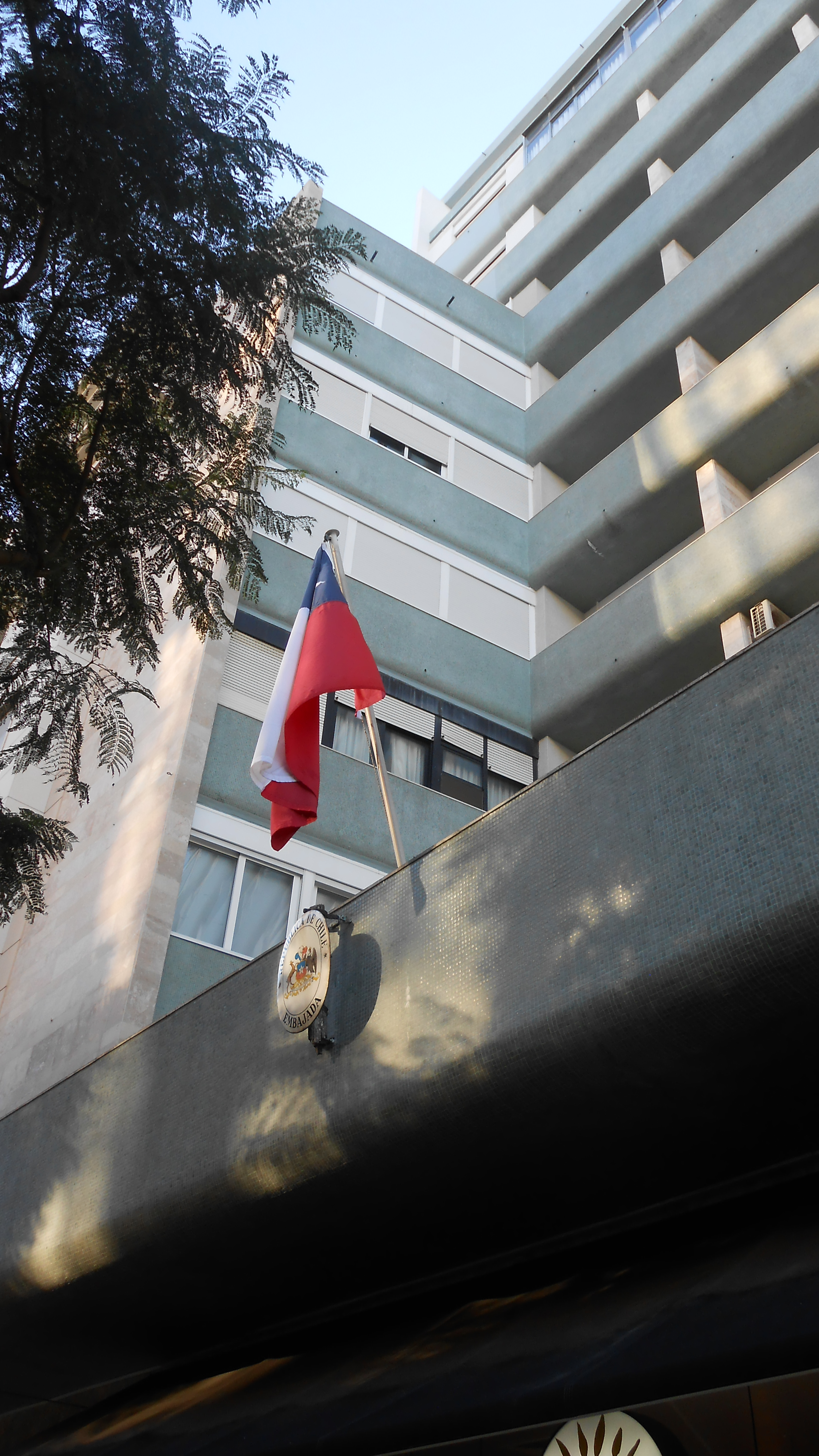
Embassy in Lisbon

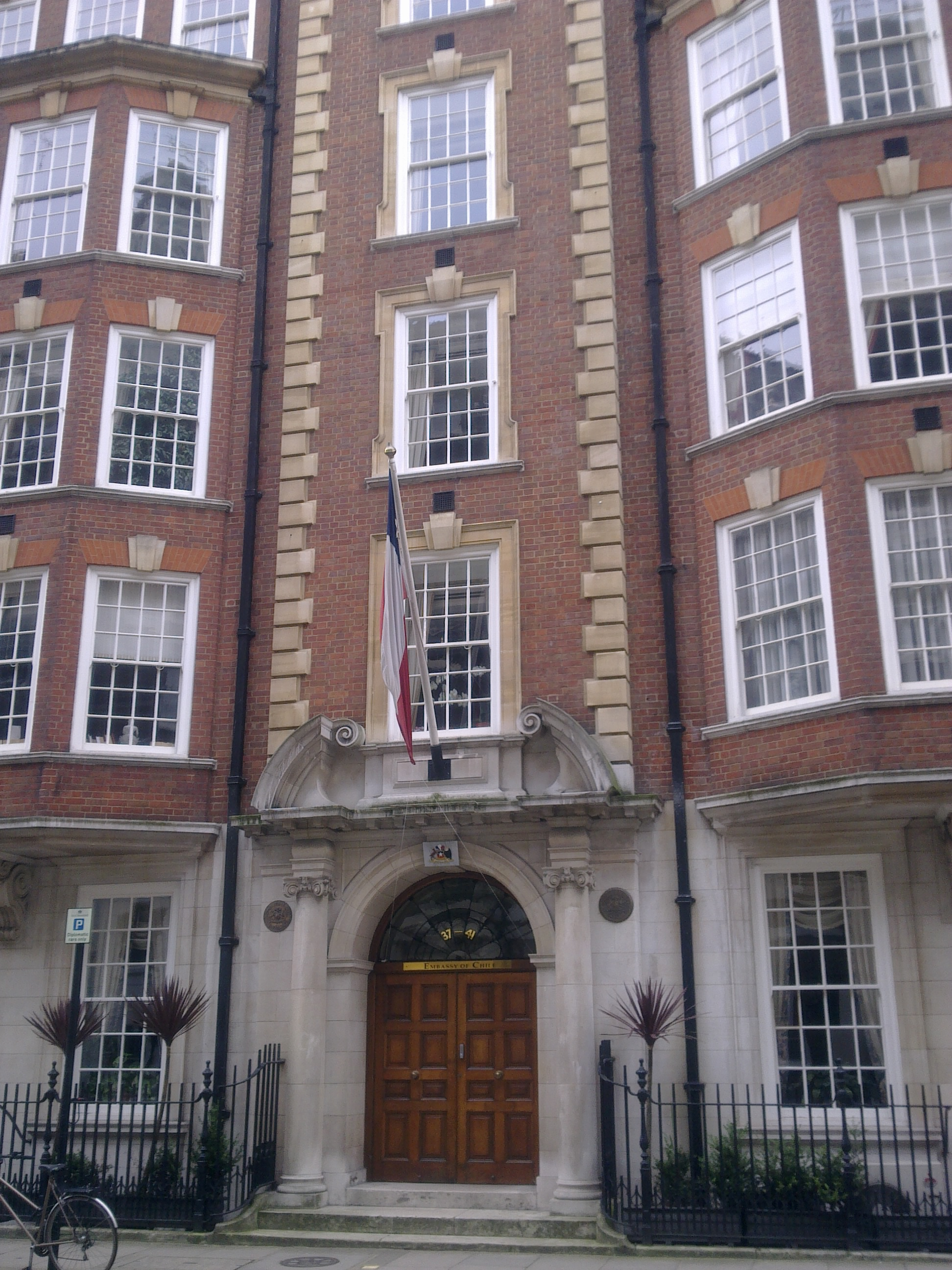
Embassy in London

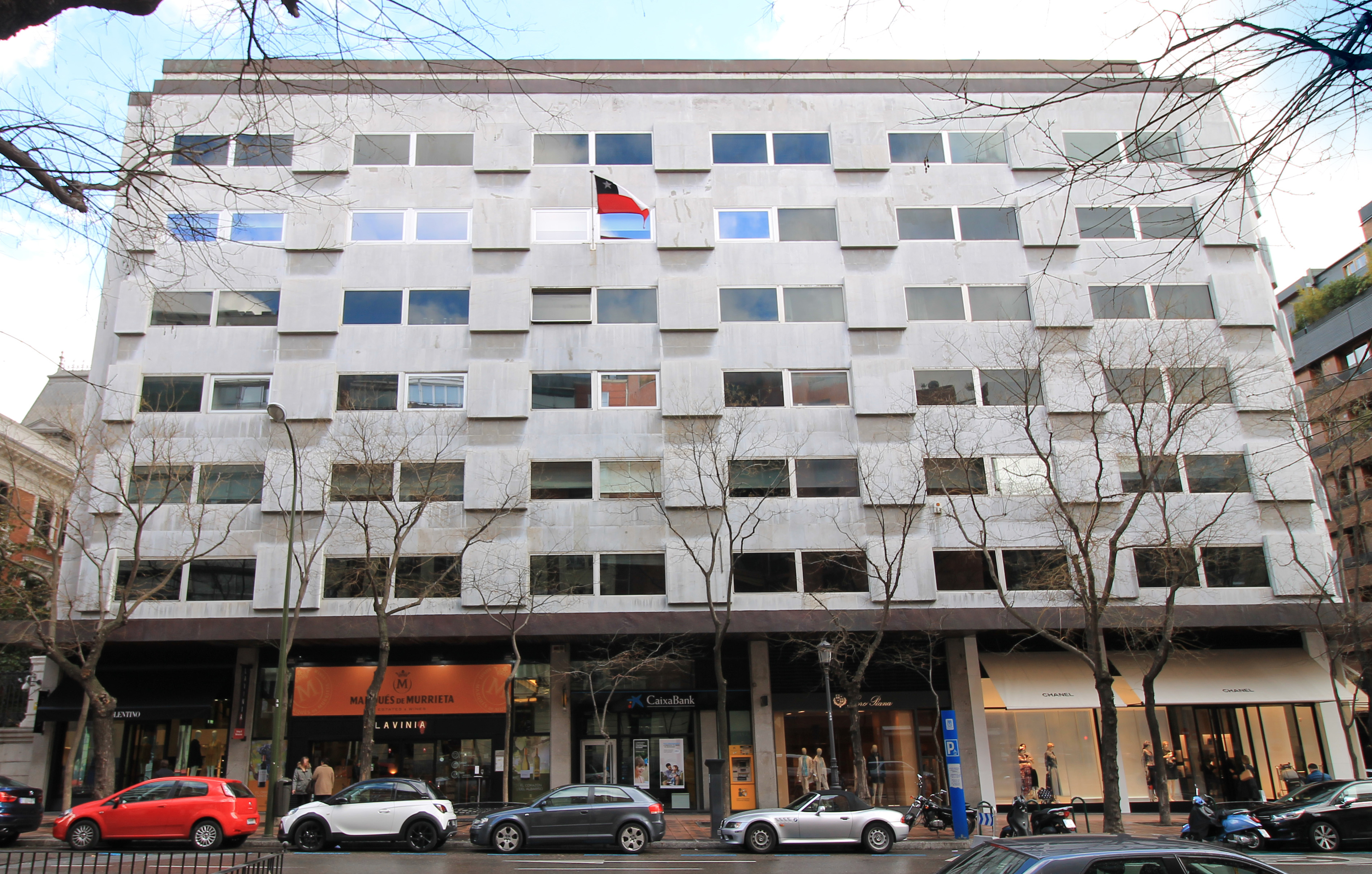
Building hosting the embassy in Madrid

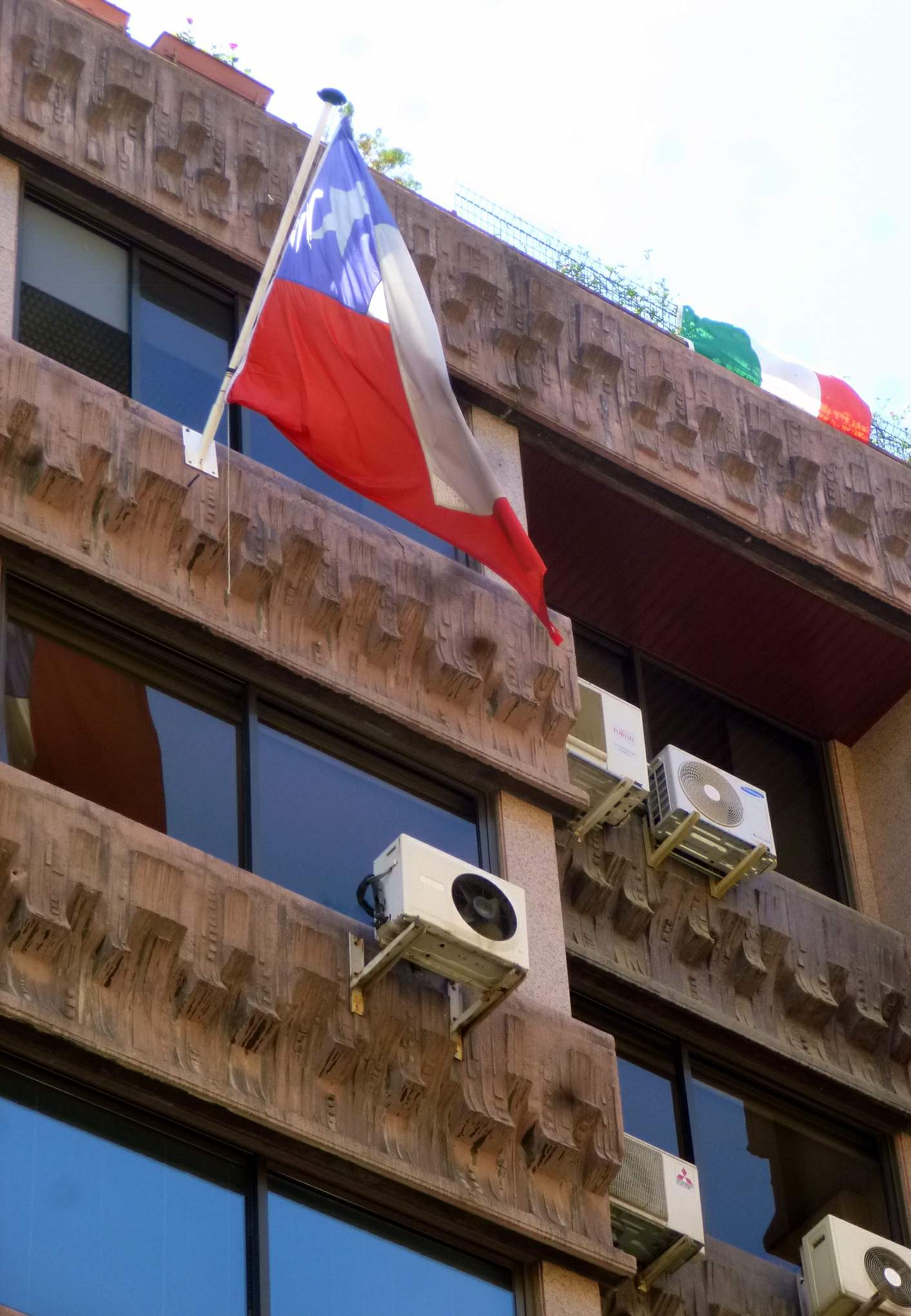
Consulate-General in Madrid

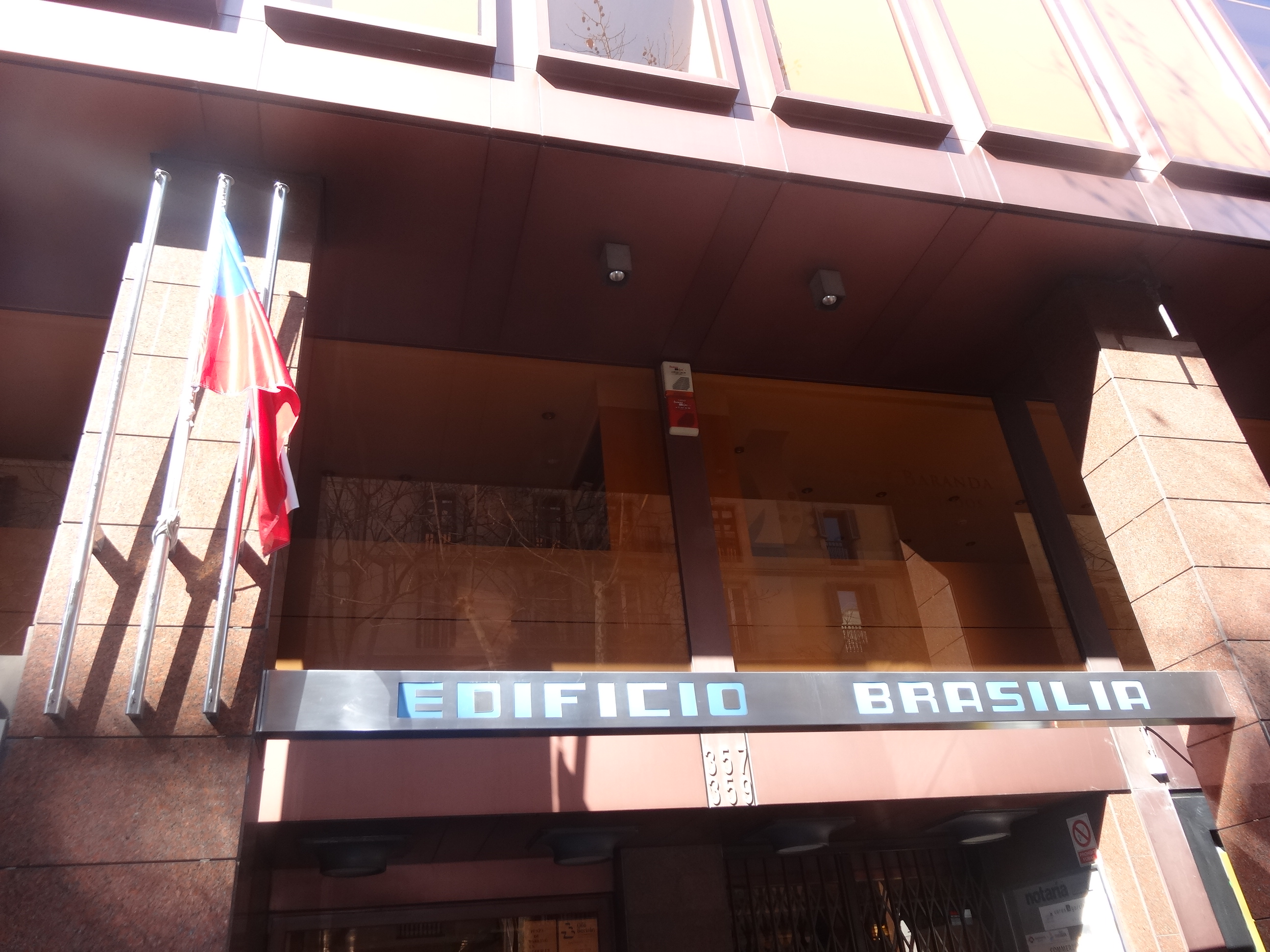
Building hosting the consulate-general in Barcelona

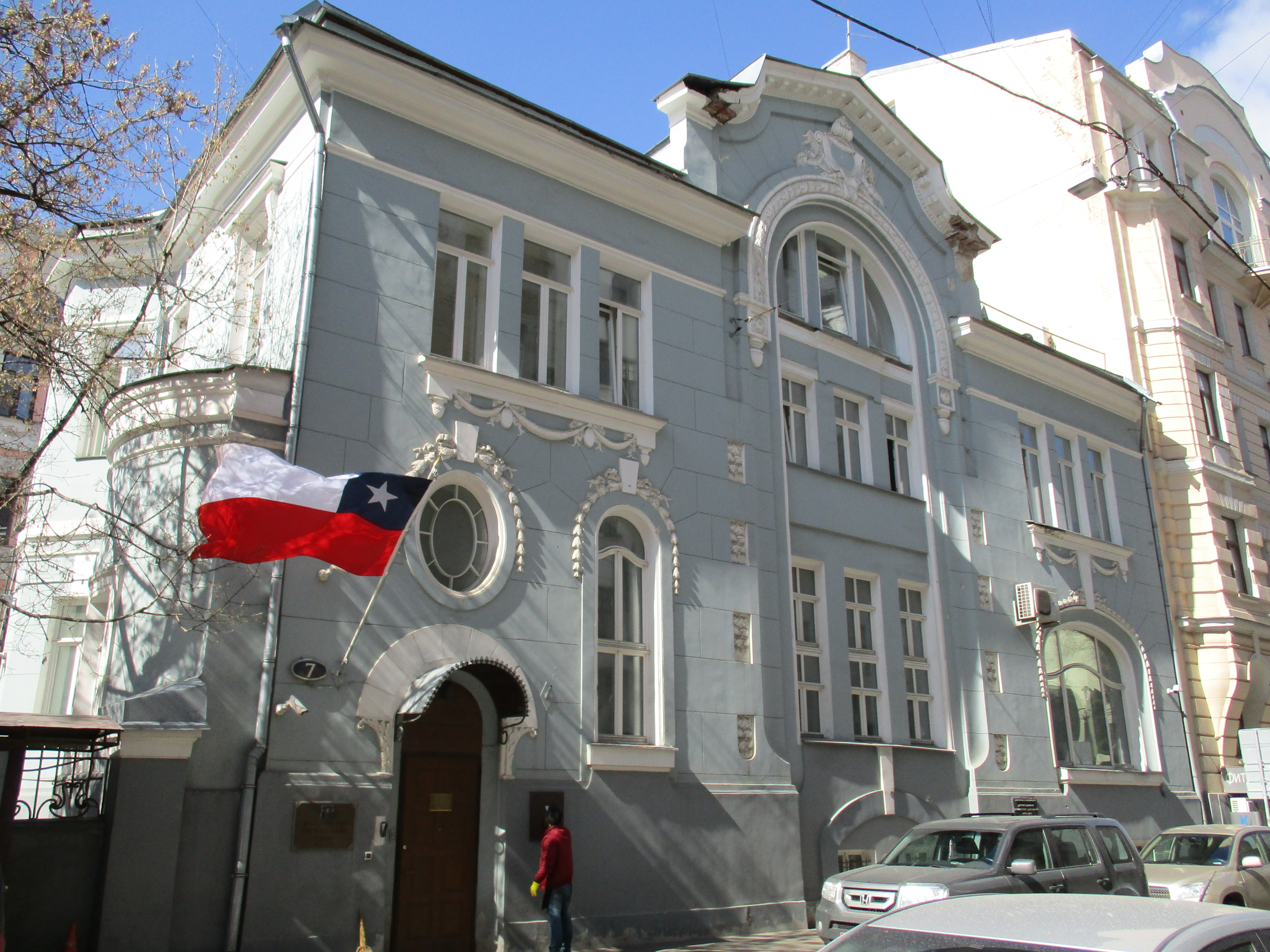
Embassy in Moscow

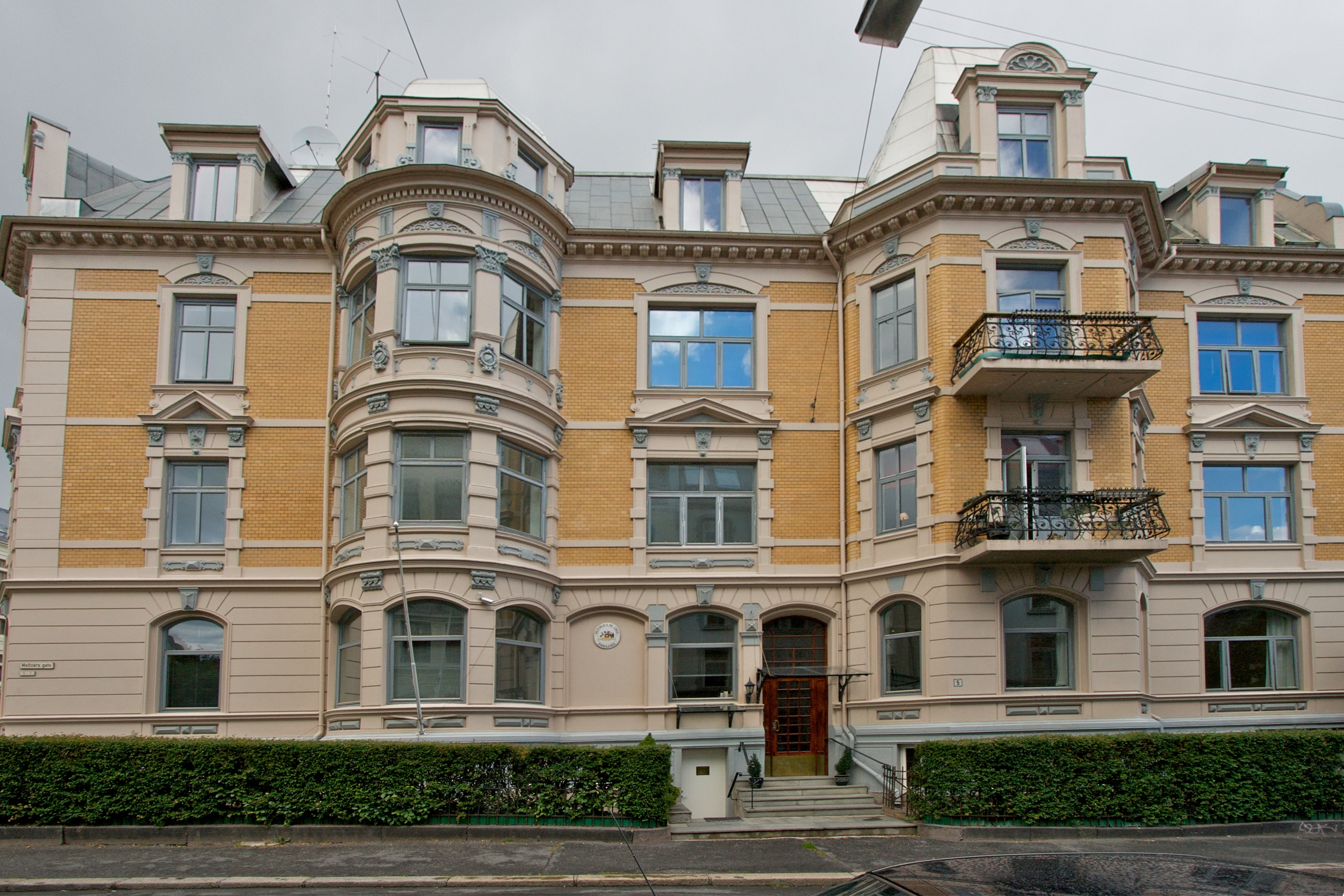
Embassy in Oslo

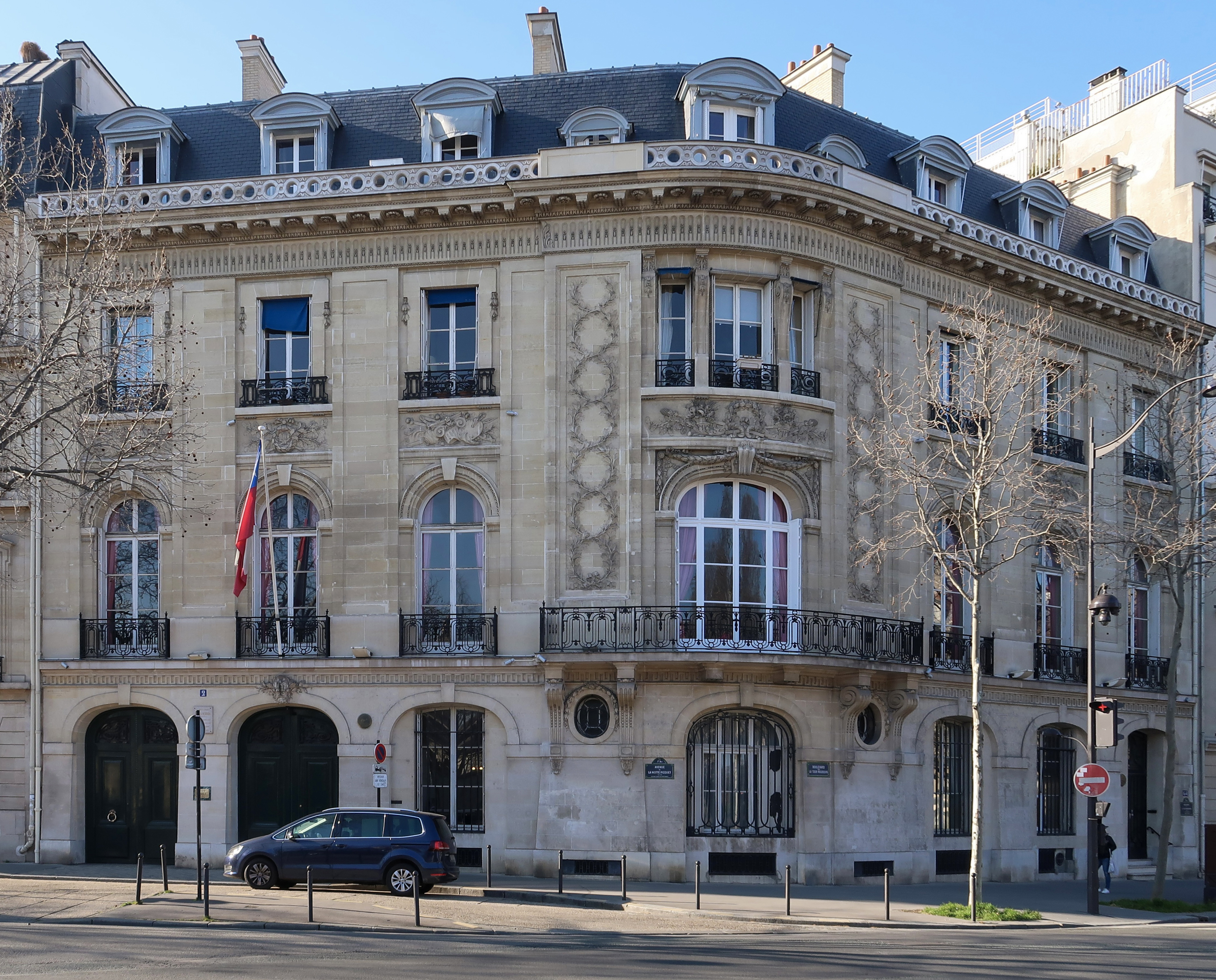
Embassy in Paris

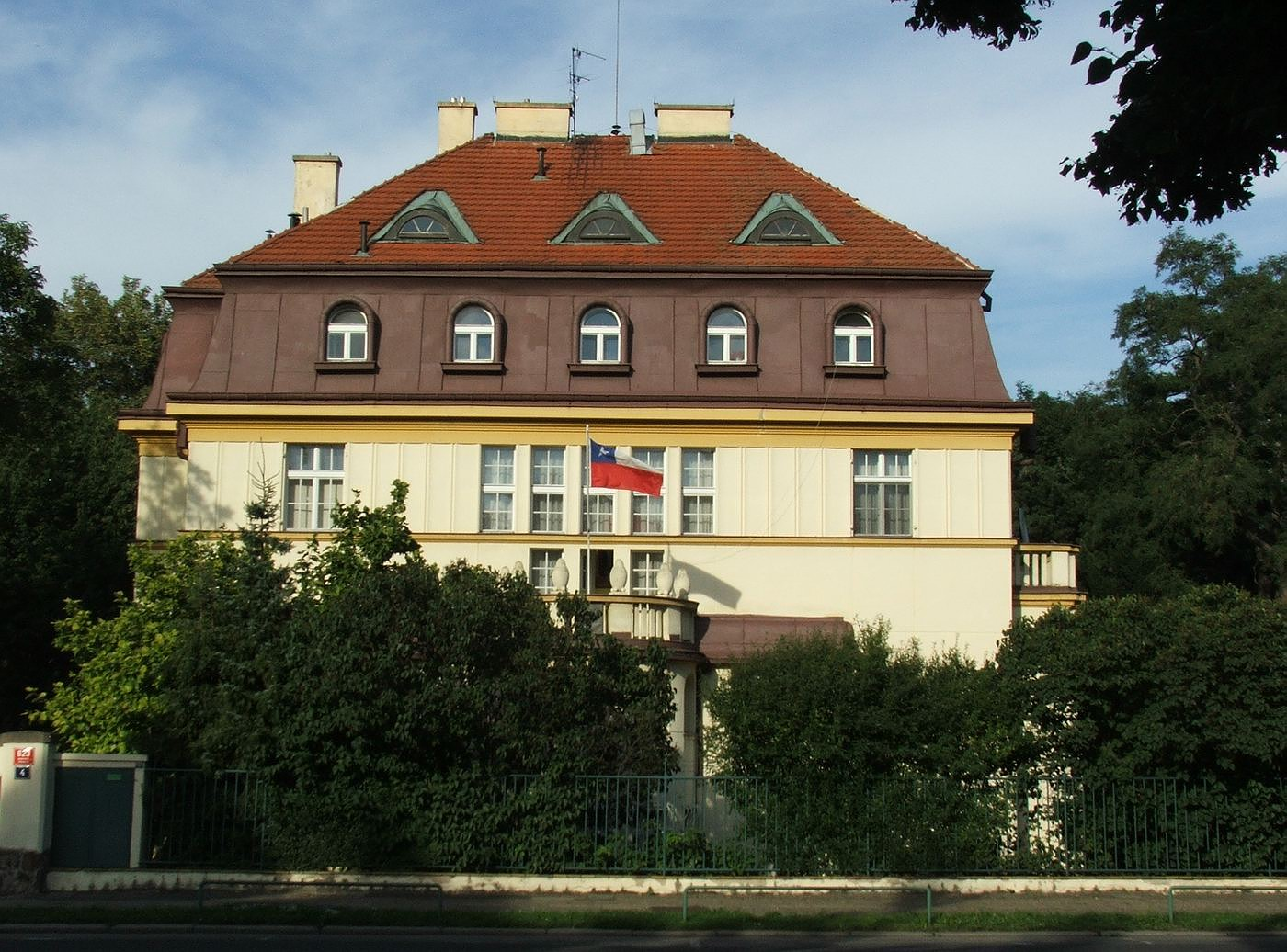
Embassy in Prague

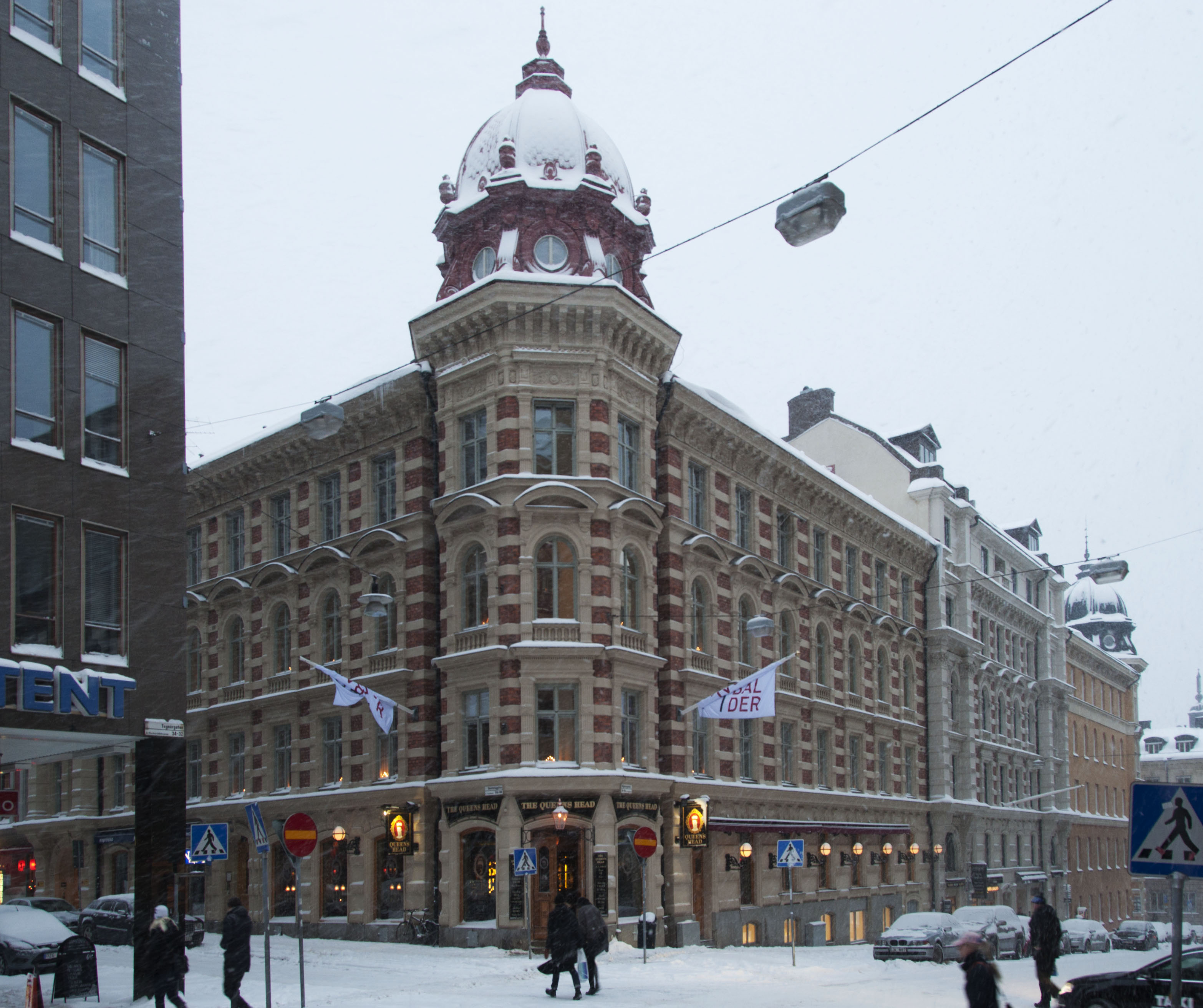
Embassy in Stockholm

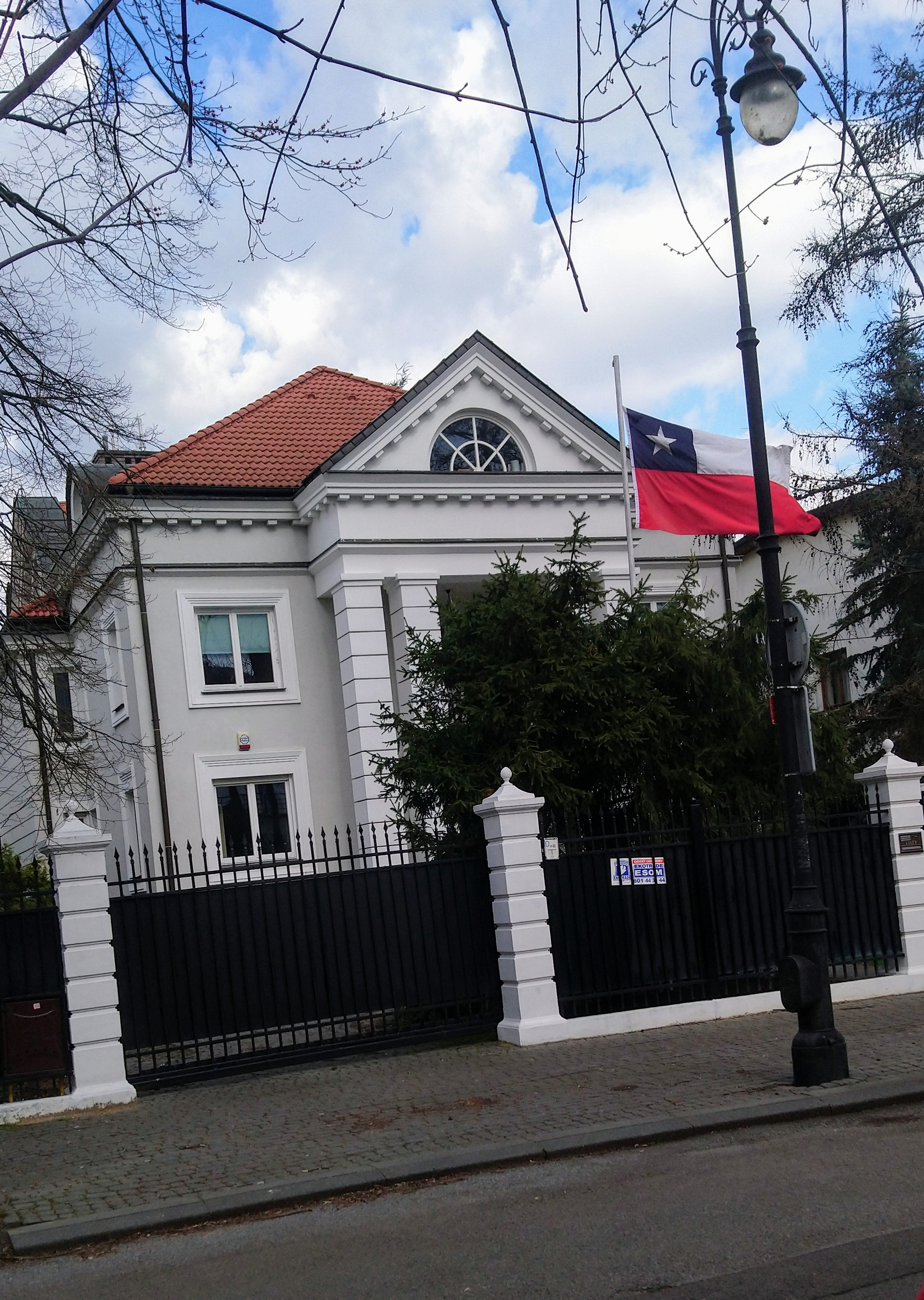
Embassy in Warsaw

=== Oceania ===
| Host country | Host city | Mission | Concurrent accreditation | Ref. |
|---|---|---|---|---|
| Australia | Canberra | Embassy | Countries: Papua New Guinea; Solomon Islands | |
| Australia | Melbourne | Consulate-General | Countries: Papua New Guinea; Solomon Islands | |
| Australia | Sydney | Consulate-General | Countries: Papua New Guinea; Solomon Islands | |
| New Zealand | Wellington | Embassy | Countries: Cook Islands; Fiji; Niue; Samoa; Tonga | |

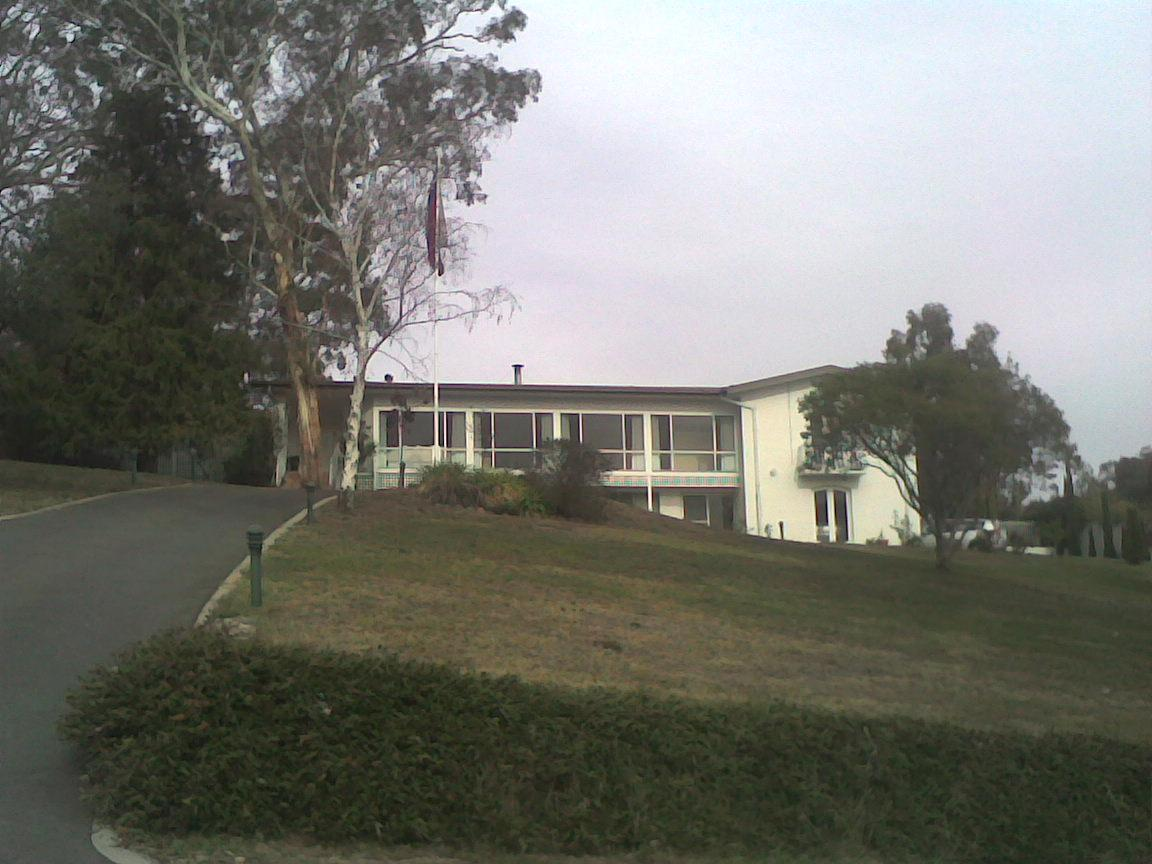
Embassy in Canberra

=== Multilateral organisations ===
| Organization | Host city | Host country | Mission | Concurrent accreditation | Ref. |
|---|---|---|---|---|---|
| Organization of American States | Washington, D.C. | United States | Permanent Mission | | |
| Organisation for Economic Co-operation and Development | Paris | France | Mission | | |
| United Nations | New York City | United States | Permanent Mission | Countries: Congo-Kinshasa; Gabon; Marshall Islands; Micronesia | |
| United Nations | Geneva | Switzerland | Permanent Mission | | |
| World Trade Organization | Geneva | Switzerland | Permanent Mission | International Organizations: United Nations Conference on Trade and Development; World Intellectual Property Organization | |

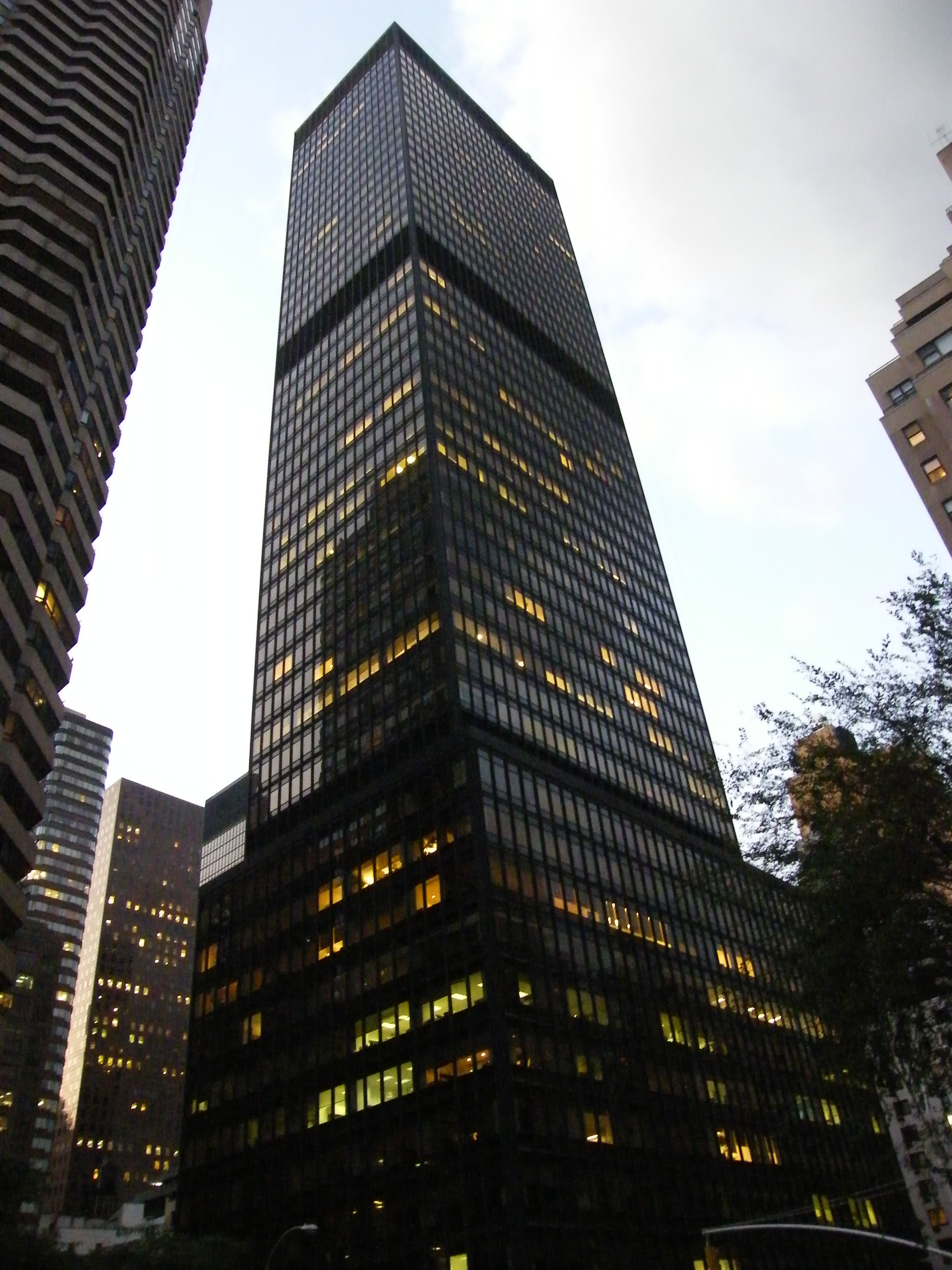
One Dag Hammarskjöld Plaza hosting the Permanent Mission to the United Nations in New York City

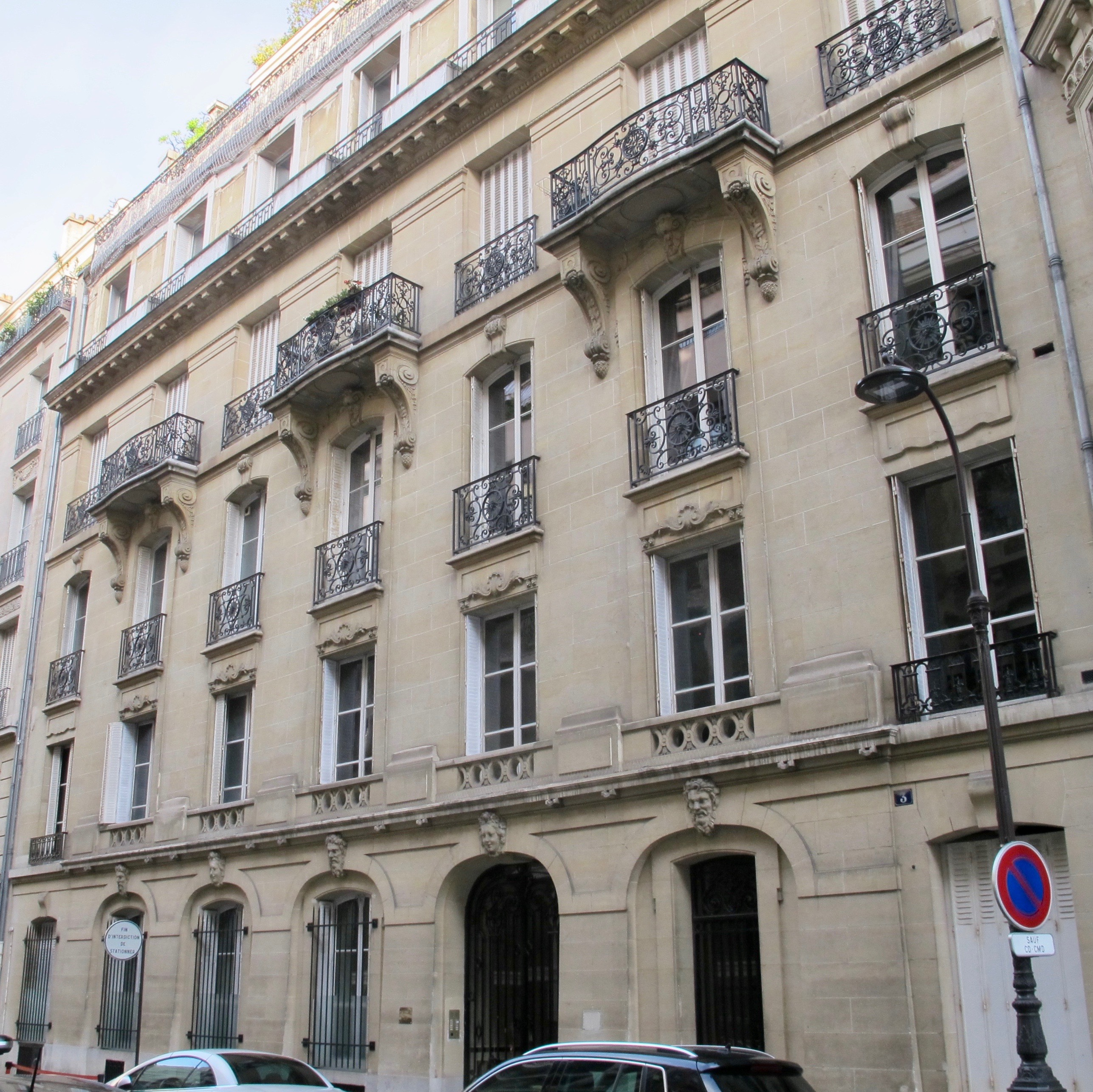
Permanent Mission to the OECD in Paris

== Closed missions ==
=== Africa ===
| Host country | Host city | Mission | Year closed | Ref. |
|---|---|---|---|---|
| Gabon | Libreville | Embassy | 1989 | |
| Ivory Coast | Abidjan | Embassy | 1991 | |
| Libya | Tripoli | Embassy | Unknown | |
| Nigeria | Lagos (Note: The embassy closed down prior to the relocation of the Nigerian capital from Lagos to Abuja in 1991.) | Embassy | 1983 | |
| Tunisia | Tunis | Embassy | Unknown | |
| Zaire (Note: The embassy closed down prior to the renaming of the Republic of Zaire into the Democratic Republic of the Congo in 1997.) | Kinshasa | Embassy | 1991 | |
| Zambia | Lusaka | Embassy | 1973 | |

=== Asia ===
| Host country | Host city | Mission | Year closed | Ref. |
|---|---|---|---|---|
| Iran | Tehran | Embassy | 2026 | |

=== Americas ===
| Host country | Host city | Mission | Year closed | Ref. |
|---|---|---|---|---|
| Venezuela | Caracas | Embassy | 2024 | |

=== Europe ===
| Host country | Host city | Mission | Year closed | Ref. |
|---|---|---|---|---|
| East Germany | East Berlin | Embassy | 1973 | |
| Yugoslavia | Belgrade | Embassy | Unknown | |

== See also ==
- Foreign relations of Chile
- List of diplomatic missions in Chile
- Visa policy of Chile
