= List of diplomatic missions of Austria =

The Republic of Austria has a rather substantial network of diplomatic posts overseas, with posts in nearly every European country, as well as a large number of missions in the Asia-Pacific and the Americas.

This listing excludes overseas coordination offices of the Austrian Development Agency, overseas offices of the Austrian Cultural Forum, and honorary consulates.

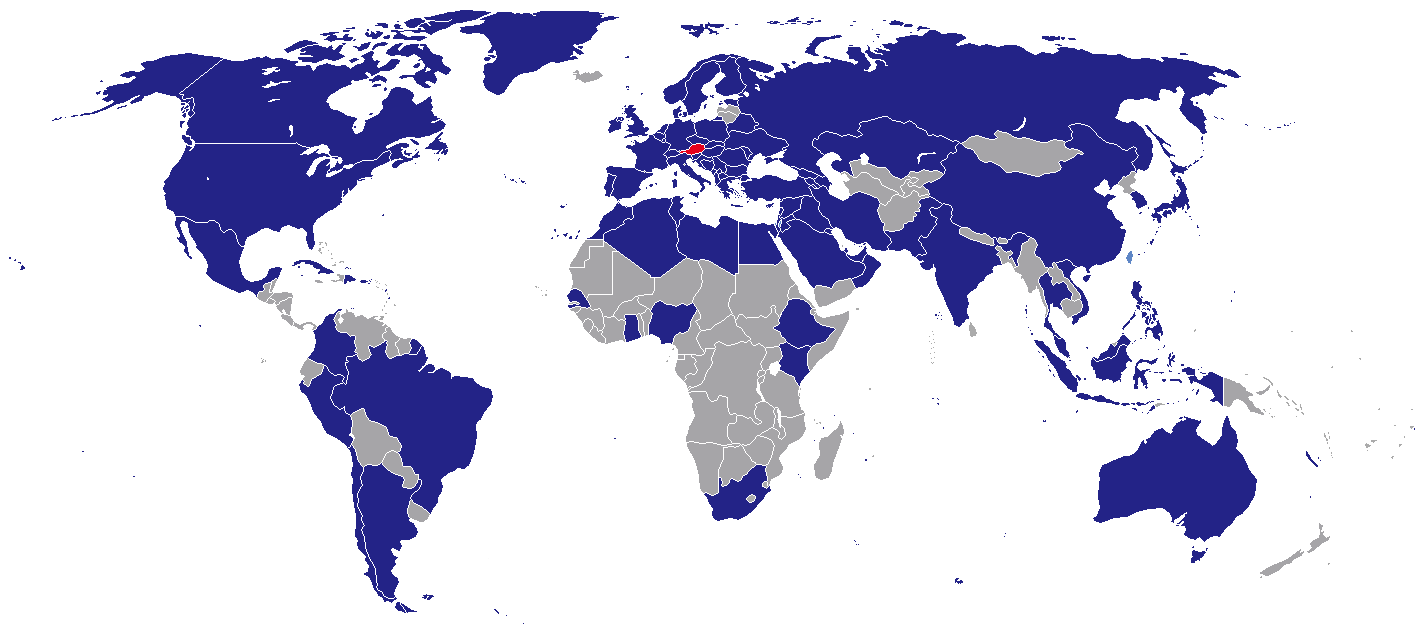
Map of Austrian diplomatic missions

== Current missions ==
=== Africa ===
Host country	Host city	Mission	Concurrent accreditation	Ref.
Algeria	Algiers	Embassy	Countries: Niger	
Egypt	Cairo	Embassy	Countries: Eritrea; Sudan; Multilateral Organizations: Arab League (Note: Accredited as an observer mission.)	
Ethiopia	Addis Ababa	Embassy	Countries: Djibouti; Congo-Brazzaville; Uganda; South Sudan; Multilateral Organizations: African Union; Intergovernmental Authority on Development	
Ghana	Accra	Embassy	Countries: Benin; Burkina Faso; Ivory Coast; Togo	
Kenya	Nairobi	Embassy	Countries: Burundi; Comoros; Congo-Kinshasa; Malawi; Rwanda; Seychelles; Somalia; Tanzania; Zambia; Multilateral Organizations: United Nations; United Nations Environment Programme; United Nations Human Settlements Programme	
Libya	Tripoli	Embassy		
Morocco	Rabat	Embassy	Countries: Mauritania	
Nigeria	Abuja	Embassy	Countries: Cameroon; Central African Republic; Chad; Equatorial Guinea; Gabon; São Tomé and Príncipe; Multilateral Organizations: Economic Community of West African States	
Senegal	Dakar	Embassy	Countries: Gambia; Guinea; Guinea-Bissau; Liberia; Mali; Sierra Leone	
South Africa	Pretoria	Embassy	Countries: Angola; Botswana; Eswatini; Lesotho; Madagascar; Mauritius; Mozambique; Namibia; Zimbabwe; Multilateral Organizations: Southern African Development Community	
Tunisia	Tunis	Embassy		

=== Americas ===
Host country	Host city	Mission level	Concurrent accreditation	Ref.
Argentina	Buenos Aires	Embassy	Countries: Paraguay; Uruguay	
Brazil	Brasília	Embassy	Countries: Suriname	
Brazil	São Paulo	Consulate-General	Countries: Suriname	
Canada	Ottawa	Embassy	Countries: Jamaica	
Chile	Santiago de Chile	Embassy		
Colombia	Bogotá	Embassy	Countries: Barbados; Ecuador; Guyana; Panama; Trinidad and Tobago; Multilateral Organizations: Caribbean Community	
Cuba	Havana	Embassy	Countries: Antigua and Barbuda; Dominica; Dominican Republic; Grenada; Haiti; Saint Kitts and Nevis; Saint Lucia; Saint Vincent and the Grenadines; Venezuela	
Dominican Republic	Santo Domingo	Embassy office (Note: Subordinate to the Austrian embassy in Havana, Cuba.)		
Mexico	Mexico City	Embassy	Countries: Belize; Costa Rica; El Salvador; Guatemala; Honduras; Nicaragua	
Peru	Lima	Embassy	Countries: Bolivia	
United States	Washington, D.C.	Embassy	Countries: Bahamas; Multilateral Organizations: Organization of American States	
United States	Los Angeles	Consulate-General	Countries: Bahamas; Multilateral Organizations: Organization of American States	
United States	New York City	Consulate-General	Countries: Bahamas; Multilateral Organizations: Organization of American States	
United States	San Francisco	Consulate	Countries: Bahamas; Multilateral Organizations: Organization of American States	

=== Asia ===
Host country	Host city	Mission	Concurrent accreditation	Ref.
Armenia	Yerevan	Embassy office		
Azerbaijan	Baku	Embassy	Countries: Turkmenistan	
China	Beijing	Embassy	Countries: Mongolia	
China	Chengdu	Consulate-General	Countries: Mongolia	
China	Guangzhou	Consulate-General	Countries: Mongolia	
China	Hong Kong	Consulate-General	Countries: Mongolia	
China	Shanghai	Consulate-General	Countries: Mongolia	
Georgia	Tbilisi	Embassy	Countries: Armenia	
India	New Delhi	Embassy	Countries: Bangladesh; Bhutan; Maldives; Nepal; Sri Lanka	
Indonesia	Jakarta	Embassy	Countries: Timor-Leste; Multilateral Organizations: Association of Southeast Asian Nations	
Iran	Tehran	Embassy		
Iraq	Baghdad	Embassy		
Israel	Tel Aviv	Embassy		
Japan	Tokyo	Embassy		
Jordan	Amman	Embassy	Multilateral Organizations: UNRWA	
Kazakhstan	Astana	Embassy	Countries: Kyrgyzstan; Tajikistan	
Kuwait	Kuwait City	Embassy	Countries: Bahrain	
Lebanon	Beirut	Embassy		
Malaysia	Kuala Lumpur	Embassy	Countries: Brunei	
Oman	Muscat	Embassy	Countries: Yemen	
Pakistan	Islamabad	Embassy	Countries: Afghanistan	
Palestine	Ramallah	Representative office		
Philippines	Manila	Embassy	Countries: Palau	
Qatar	Doha	Embassy		
Saudi Arabia	Riyadh	Embassy		
Singapore	Singapore	Embassy		
South Korea	Seoul	Embassy	Countries: North Korea	
Syria	Damascus	Embassy		
Taiwan	Taipei	Office		
Thailand	Bangkok	Embassy	Countries: Cambodia; Laos; Myanmar	
Turkey	Ankara	Embassy		
Turkey	Istanbul	Consulate-General		
United Arab Emirates	Abu Dhabi	Embassy		
Vietnam	Hanoi	Embassy		

=== Europe ===
Host country	Host city	Mission	Concurrent accreditation	Ref.
Albania	Tirana	Embassy		
Belarus	Minsk	Embassy		
Belgium	Brussels	Embassy		
Bosnia and Herzegovina	Sarajevo	Embassy		
Bulgaria	Sofia	Embassy		
Croatia	Zagreb	Embassy		
Cyprus	Nicosia	Embassy		
Czechia	Prague	Embassy		
Denmark	Copenhagen	Embassy	Countries: Iceland	
Estonia	Tallinn	Embassy		
Finland	Helsinki	Embassy		
France	Paris	Embassy	Countries: Monaco; Multilateral Organizations: UNESCO	
France	Strasbourg	Consulate-General	Countries: Monaco; Multilateral Organizations: UNESCO	
Germany	Berlin	Embassy		
Germany	Munich	Consulate-General		
Greece	Athens	Embassy		
Holy See (Note: The Austrian Embassy to the Holy See is located outside Vatican territory in Rome.)	Rome	Embassy	Countries: San Marino; Sovereign entity: Sovereign Military Order of Malta	
Hungary	Budapest	Embassy		
Ireland	Dublin	Embassy		
Italy	Rome	Embassy	Countries: Consular jurisdiction only: (Note: Malta is under the jurisdiction of the Austrian Embassy in Rome for consular matters only. Diplomatic relations are conducted directly by the Ministry of Foreign Affairs in Vienna.); Malta	
Italy	Milan	Consulate-General	Countries: Consular jurisdiction only: Malta	
Kosovo	Pristina	Embassy		
Luxembourg	Luxembourg City	Embassy		
Moldova	Chişinău	Embassy		
Montenegro	Podgorica	Embassy		
Netherlands	The Hague	Embassy	International Organizations: Organisation for the Prohibition of Chemical Weapons	
North Macedonia	Skopje	Embassy		
Norway	Oslo	Embassy		
Poland	Warsaw	Embassy	Countries: Consular jurisdiction only: (Note: Lithuania is under the jurisdiction of the Austrian Embassy in Warsaw for consular matters only. Diplomatic relations are conducted directly by the Ministry of Foreign Affairs in Vienna.); Lithuania	
Poland	Kraków	Consulate-General	Countries: Consular jurisdiction only: Lithuania	
Portugal	Lisbon	Embassy	Countries: Cape Verde	
Romania	Bucharest	Embassy		
Russia	Moscow	Embassy	Countries: Consular jurisdiction only: (Note: Uzbekistan is under the jurisdiction of the Austrian Embassy in Moscow for consular matters only. Diplomatic relations are conducted directly by the Ministry of Foreign Affairs in Vienna.); Uzbekistan	
Serbia	Belgrade	Embassy		
Slovakia	Bratislava	Embassy		
Slovenia	Ljubljana	Embassy		
Spain	Madrid	Embassy	Countries: Andorra; Multilateral Organizations: UN Tourism	
Sweden	Stockholm	Embassy	Countries: Consular jurisdiction only: (Note: Latvia is under the jurisdiction of the Austrian Embassy in Stockholm for consular matters only. Diplomatic relations are conducted directly by the Ministry of Foreign Affairs in Vienna.); Latvia	
Switzerland	Bern	Embassy	Countries: Consular jurisdiction only: (Note: Liechtenstein is under the jurisdiction of the Austrian Embassy in Bern for consular matters only. Diplomatic relations are conducted directly by the Ministry of Foreign Affairs in Vienna.); Liechtenstein	
Ukraine	Kyiv	Embassy		
United Kingdom	London	Embassy		

=== Oceania ===
Host country	Host city	Mission	Concurrent accreditation	Ref.
Australia	Canberra	Embassy	Countries: Fiji; Kiribati; Micronesia; Nauru; New Zealand; Papua New Guinea; Samoa; Solomon Islands; Tonga; Tuvalu; Vanuatu	
Australia	Sydney	Consulate-General	Countries: Fiji; Kiribati; Micronesia; Nauru; New Zealand; Papua New Guinea; Samoa; Solomon Islands; Tonga; Tuvalu; Vanuatu	

=== Multilateral organizations ===
Organization	Host city	Host country	Mission	Concurrent accreditation	Ref.
Council of Europe	Strasbourg	France	Permanent Representation		
European Union	Brussels	Belgium	Permanent Mission		
Food and Agriculture Organization	Rome	Italy	Permanent Representation		
NATO	Brussels	Belgium	Mission		
Organisation for Economic Co-operation and Development	Paris	France	Permanent Representation		
Organization for Security and Co-operation in Europe	Vienna	Austria	Permanent Representation		
United Nations	New York City	United States	Permanent Mission		
United Nations	Geneva	Switzerland	Permanent Mission	Multilateral Organizations: World Trade Organization	
United Nations	Vienna	Austria	Permanent Mission	Multilateral Organizations: International Atomic Energy Agency; UNIDO; United Nations Office on Drugs and Crime	

== Gallery ==
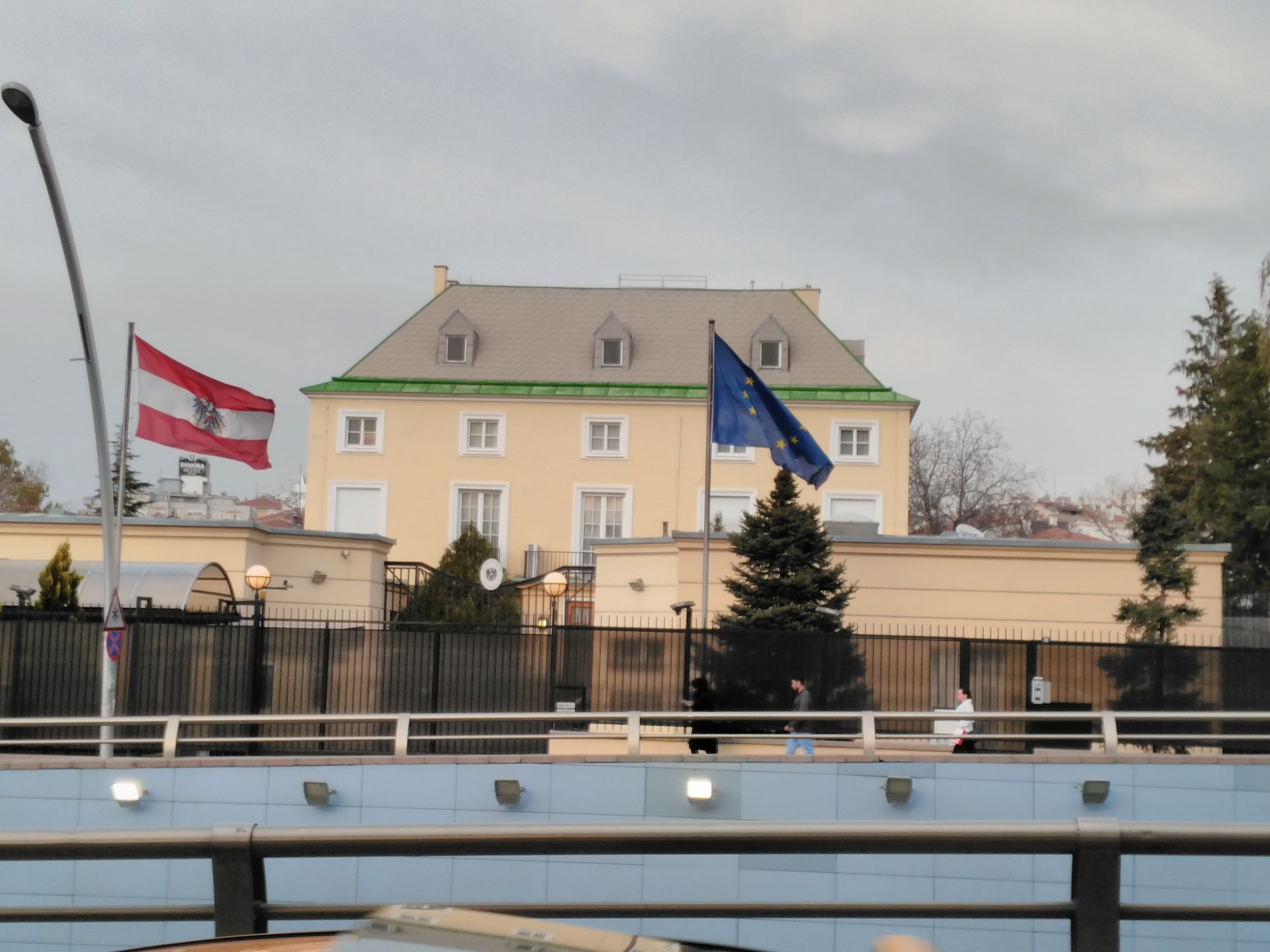
Embassy in Ankara

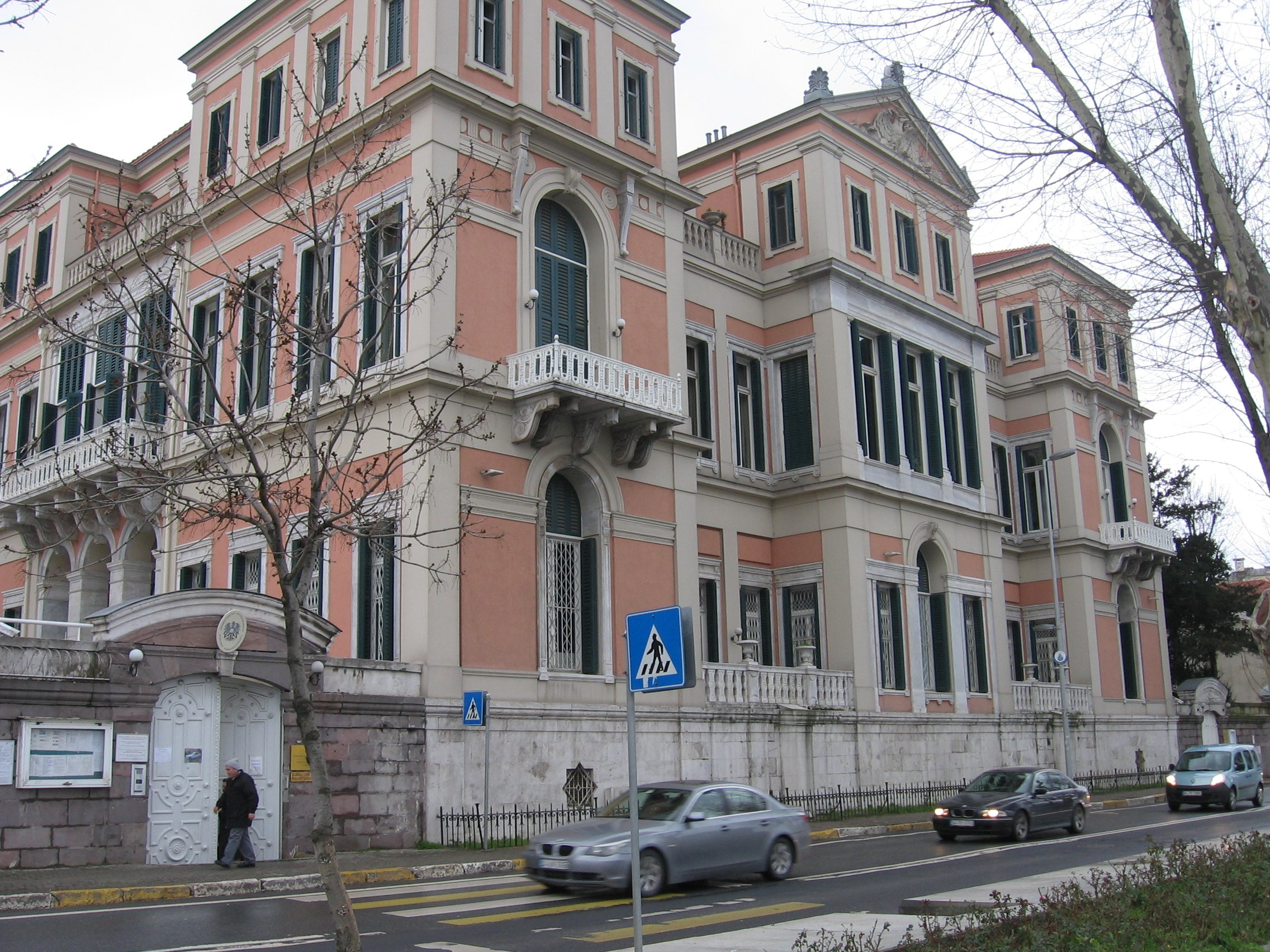
Consulate-General in Istanbul

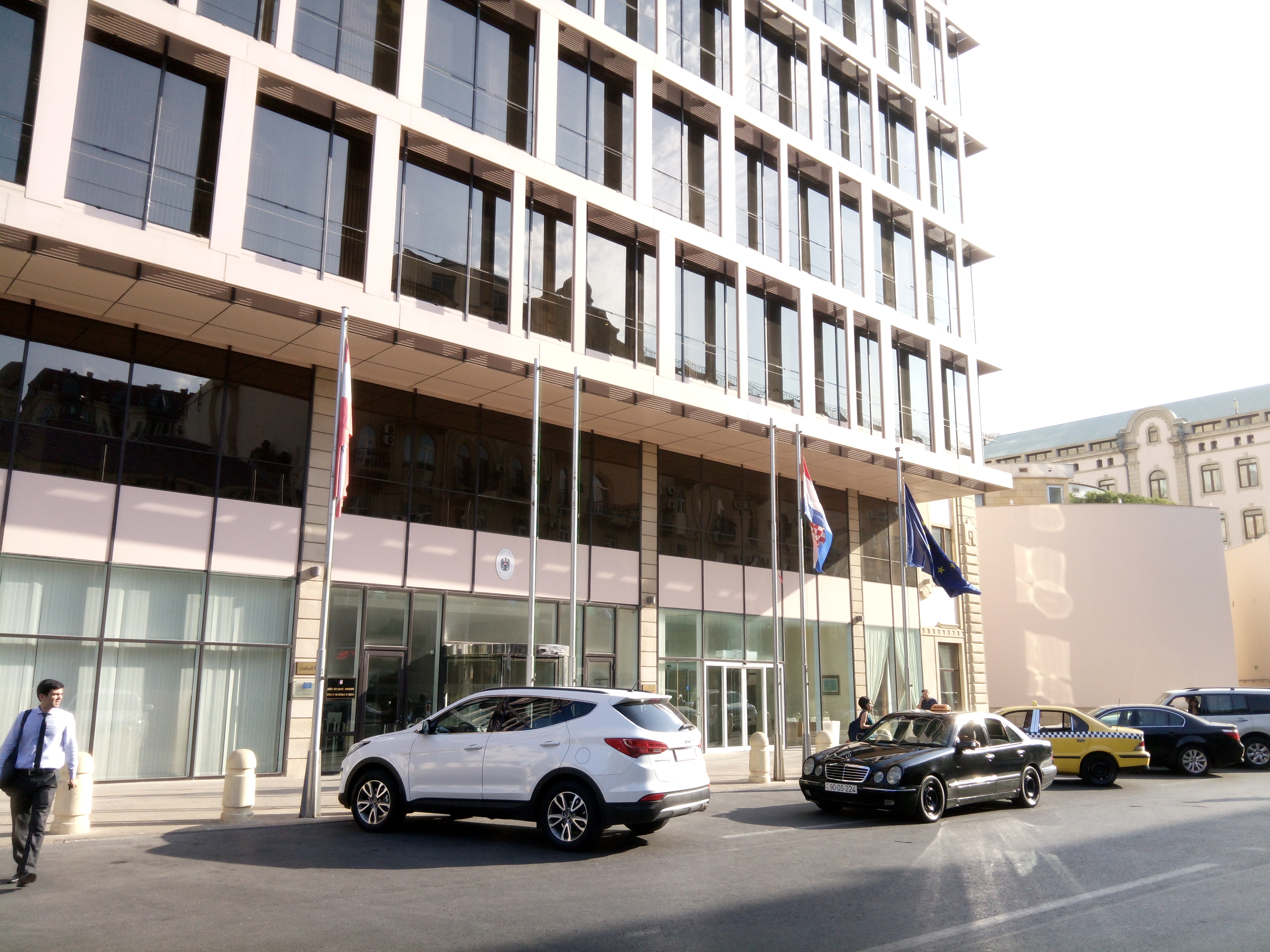
Embassy in Baku

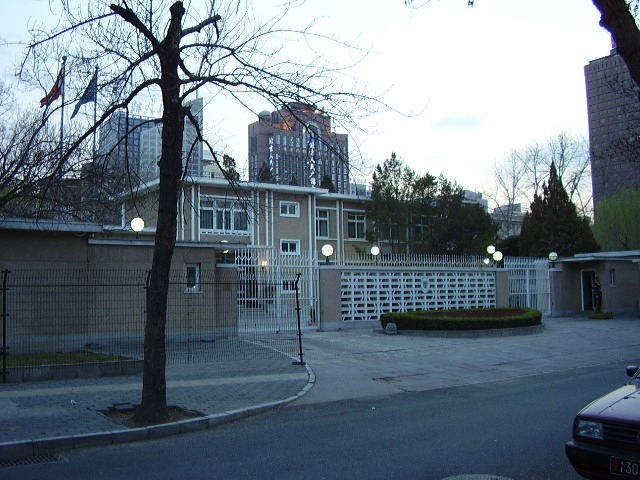
Embassy in Beijing

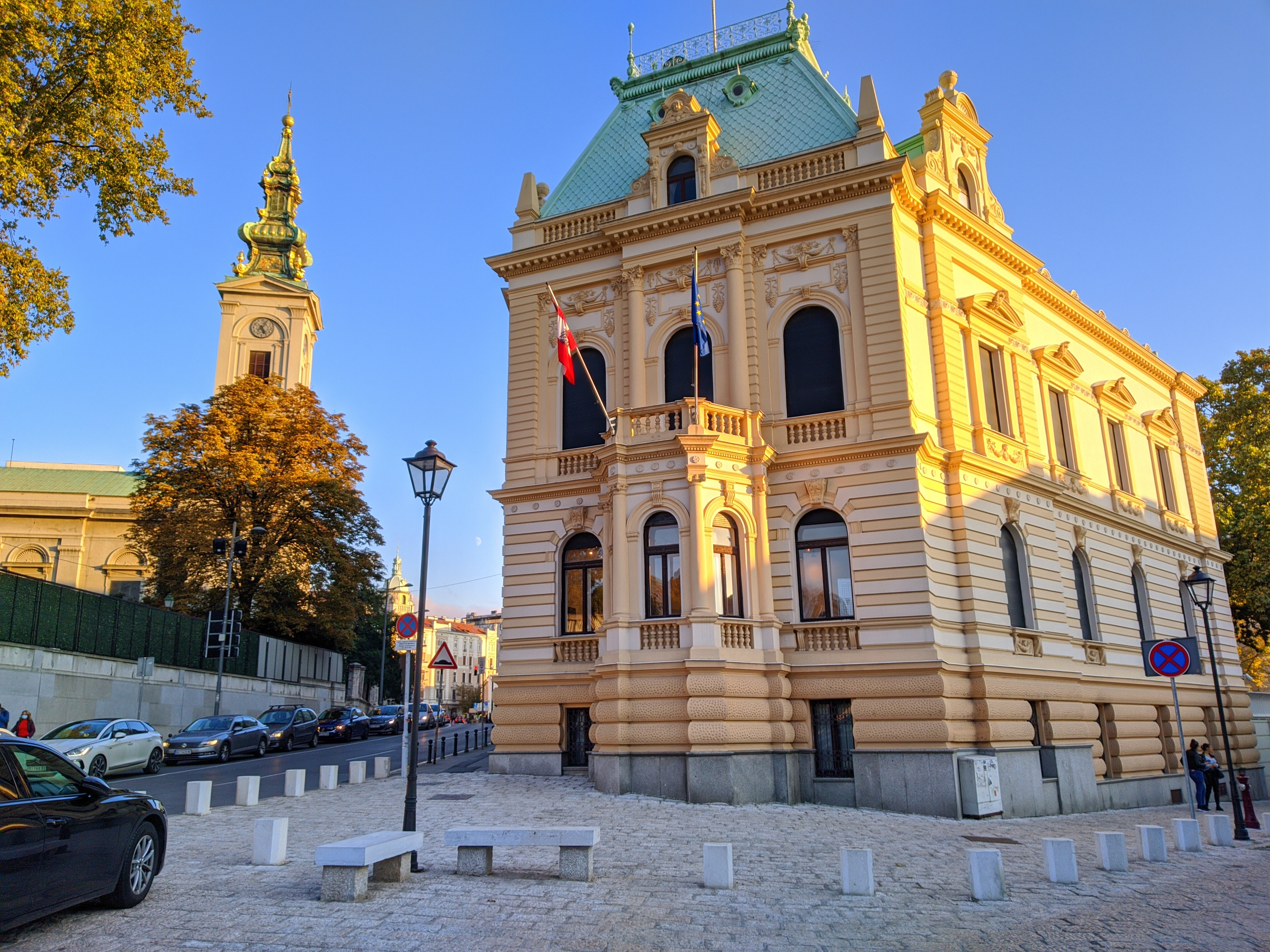
Embassy in Belgrade

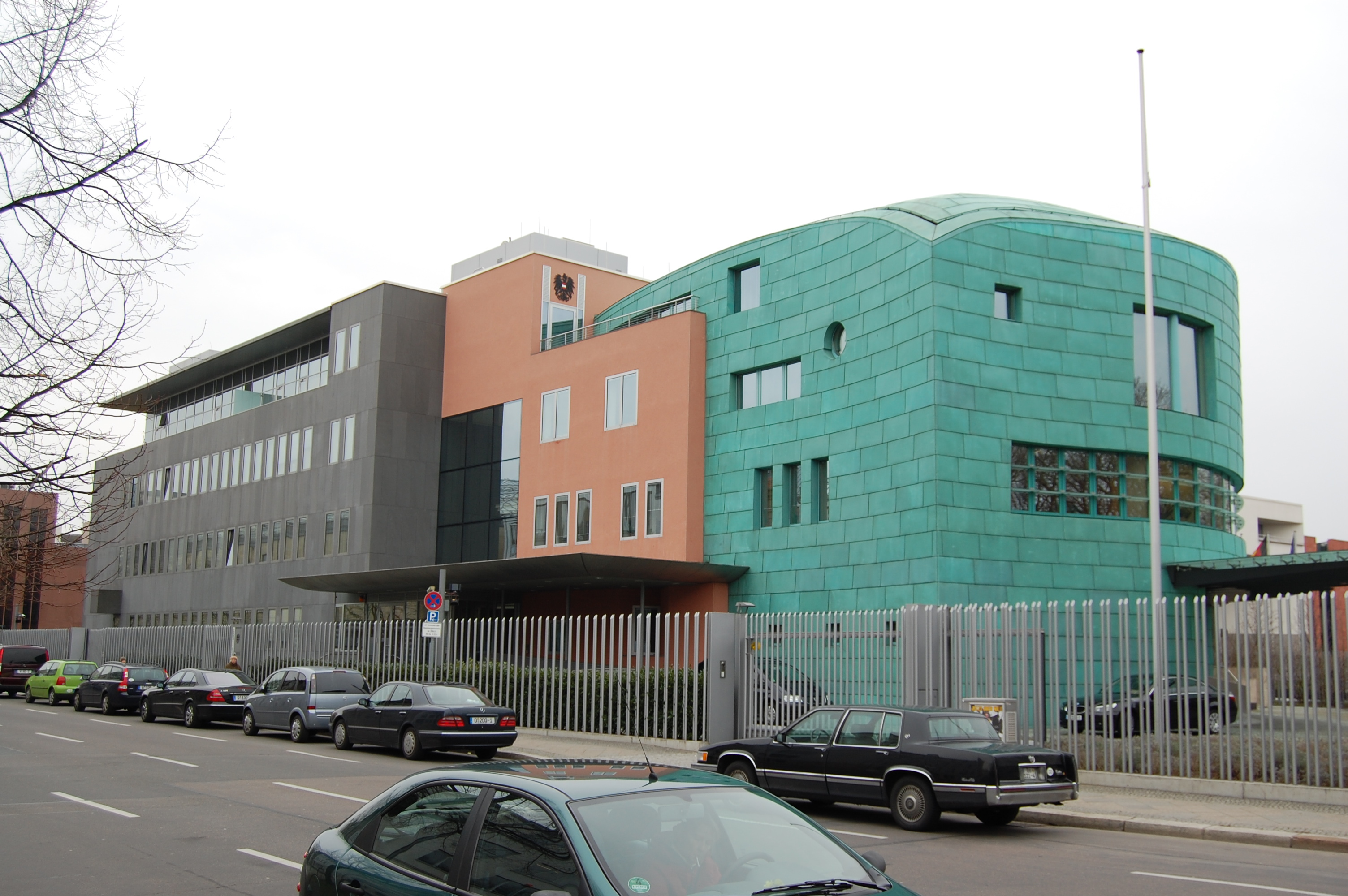
Embassy in Berlin

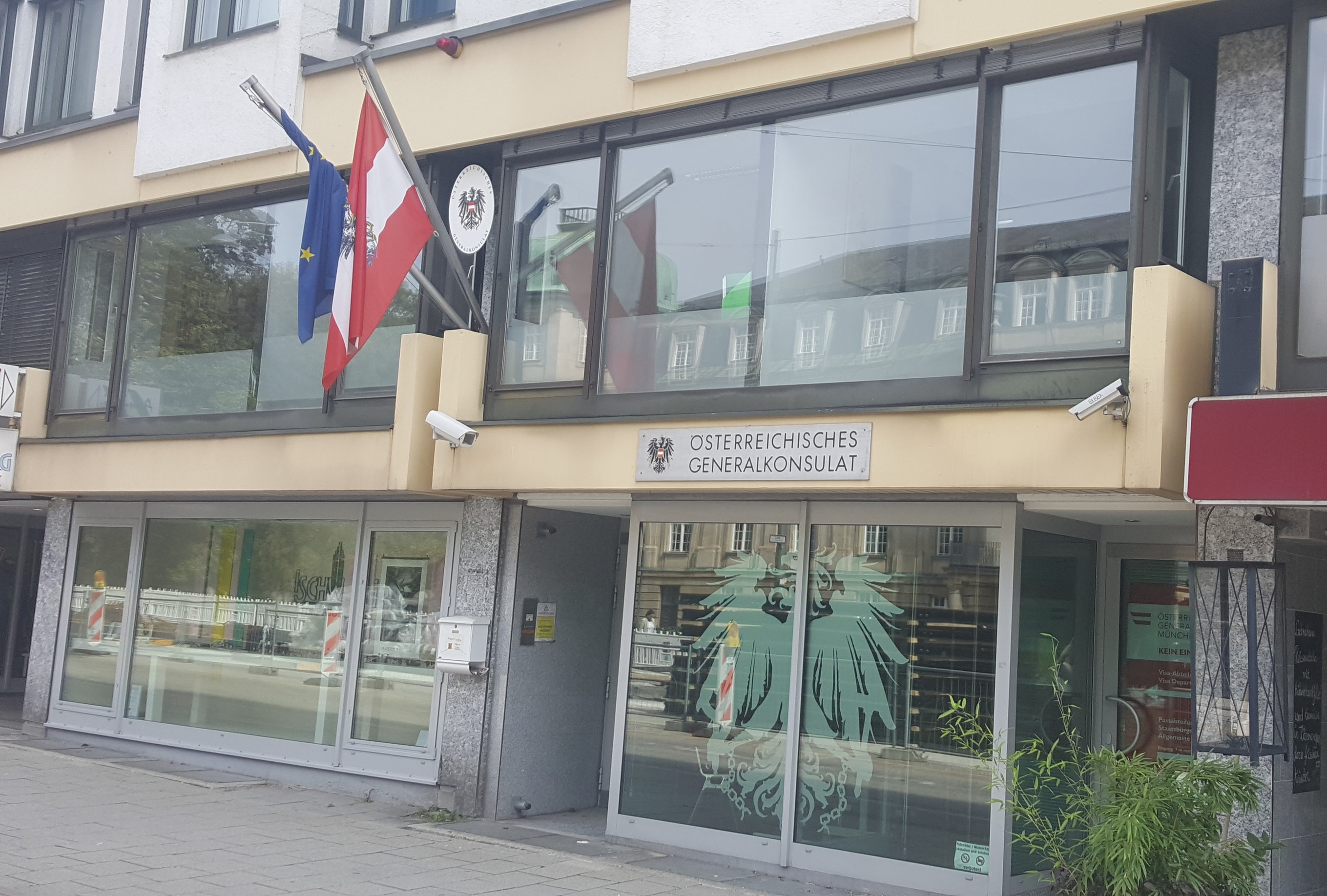
Consulate-General in Munich

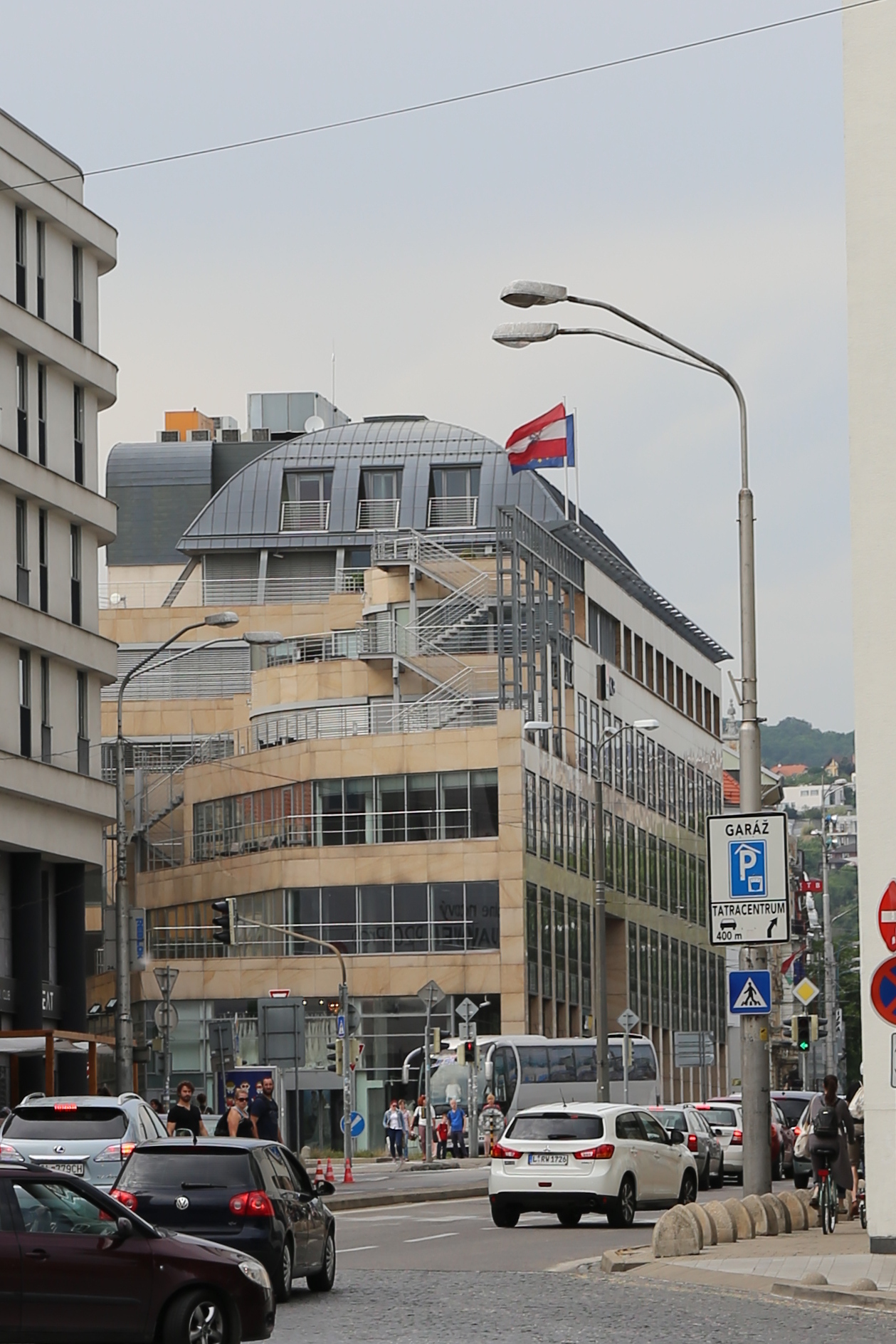
Embassy in Bratislava

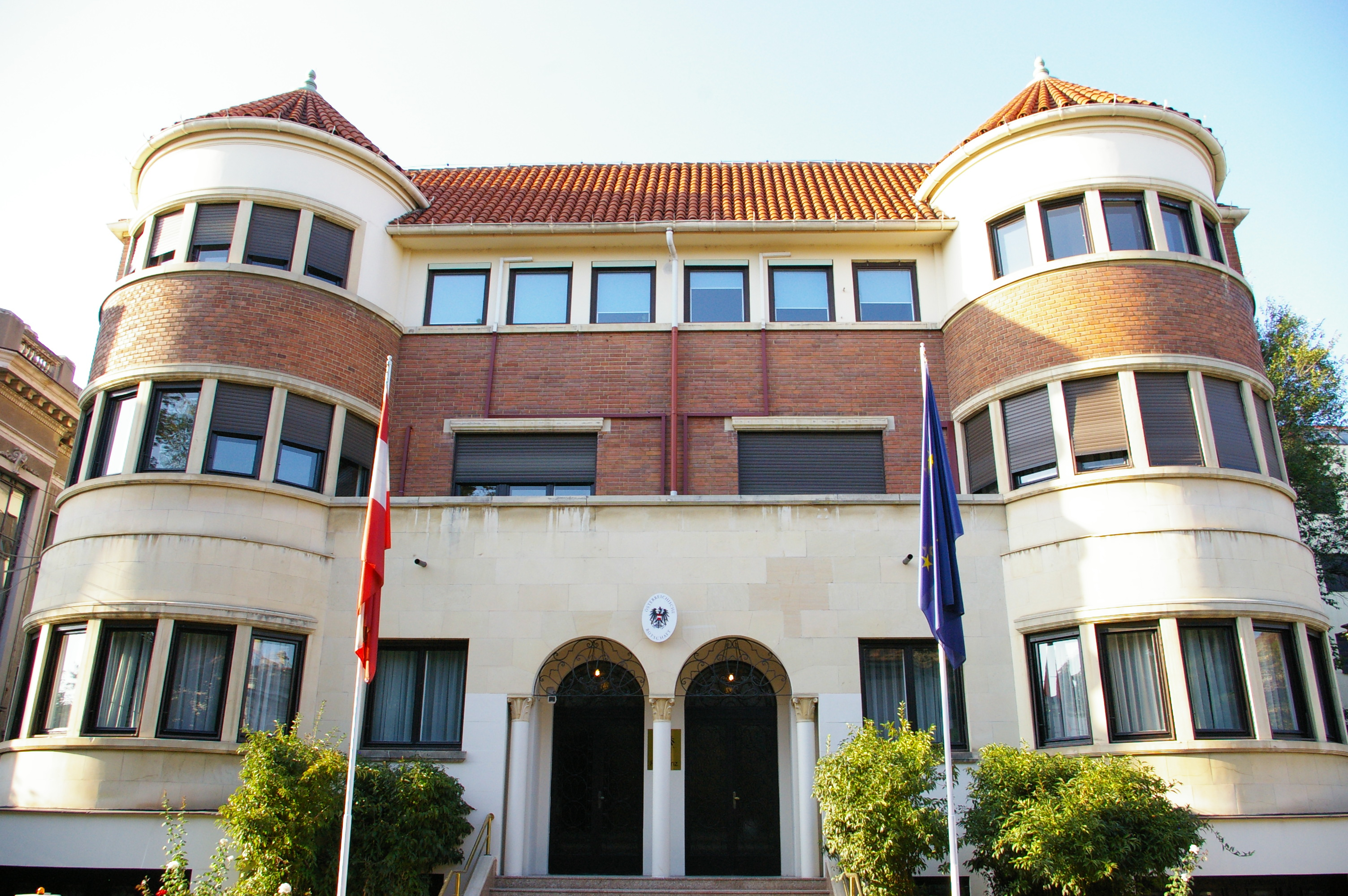
Embassy in Bucharest

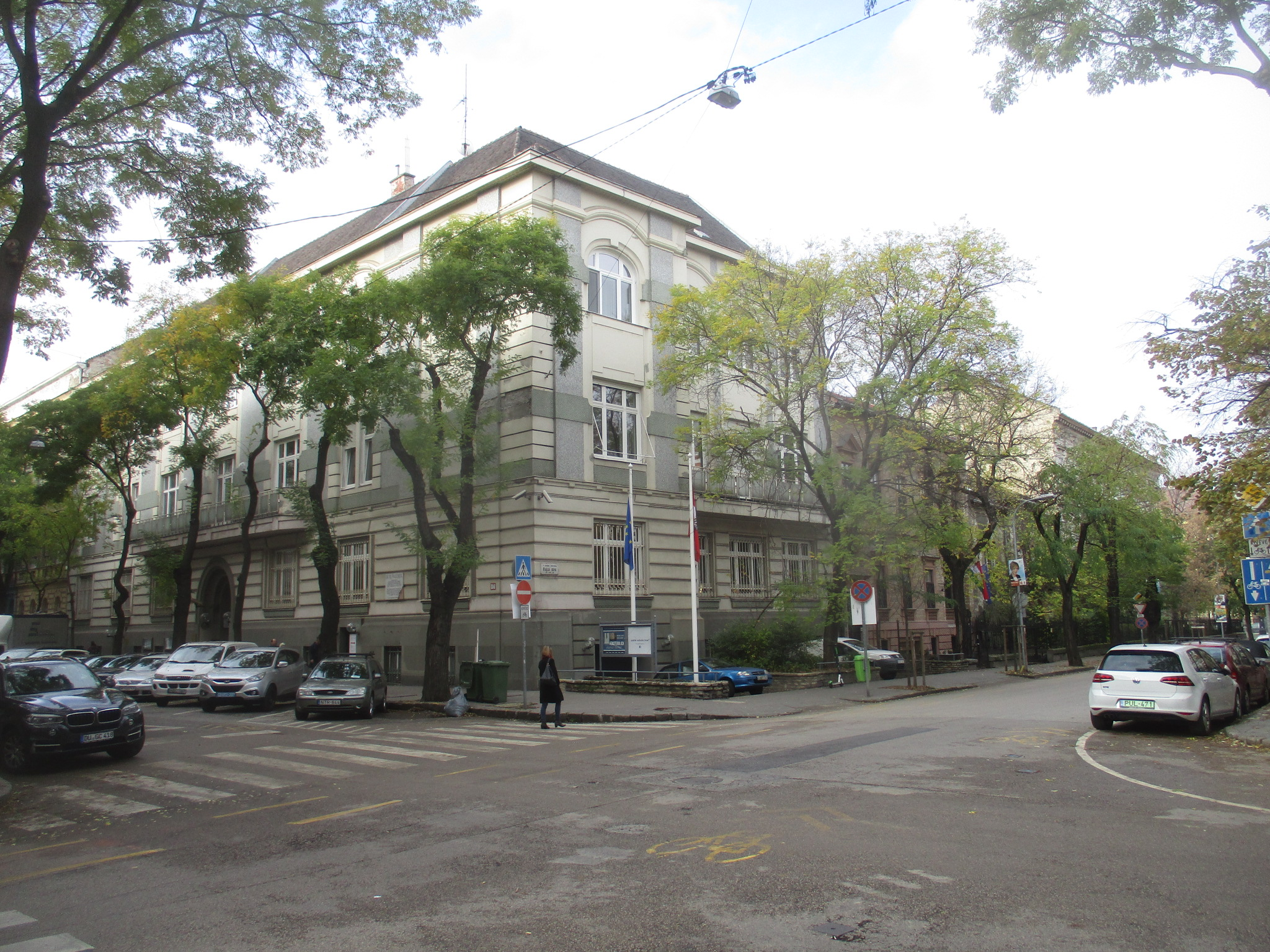
Embassy in Budapest

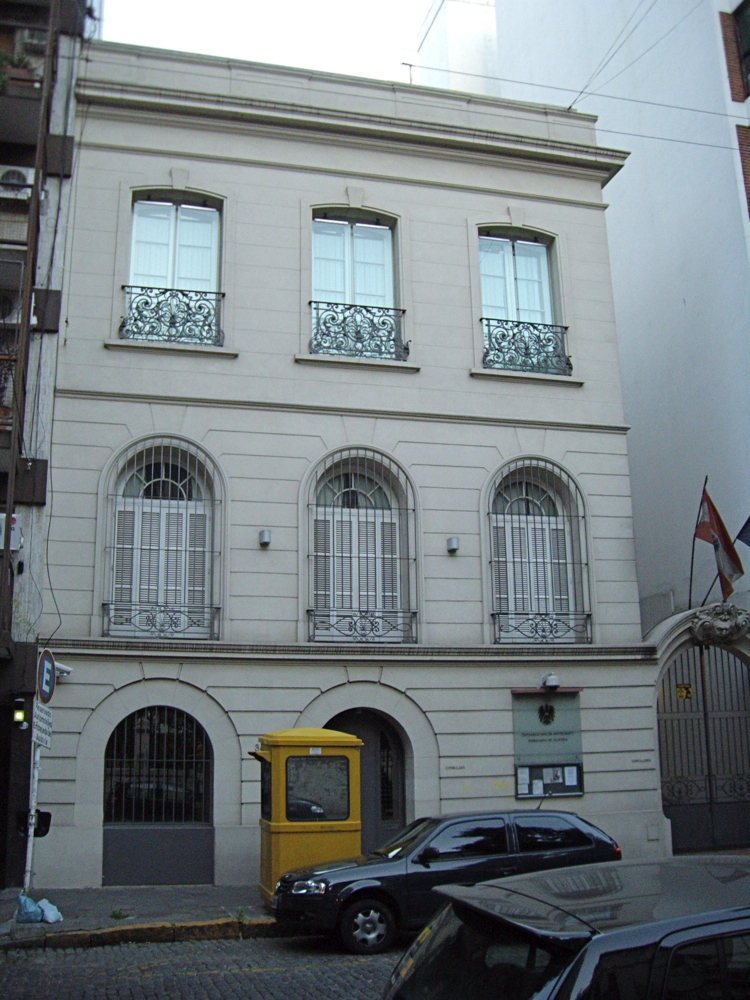
Embassy in Buenos Aires

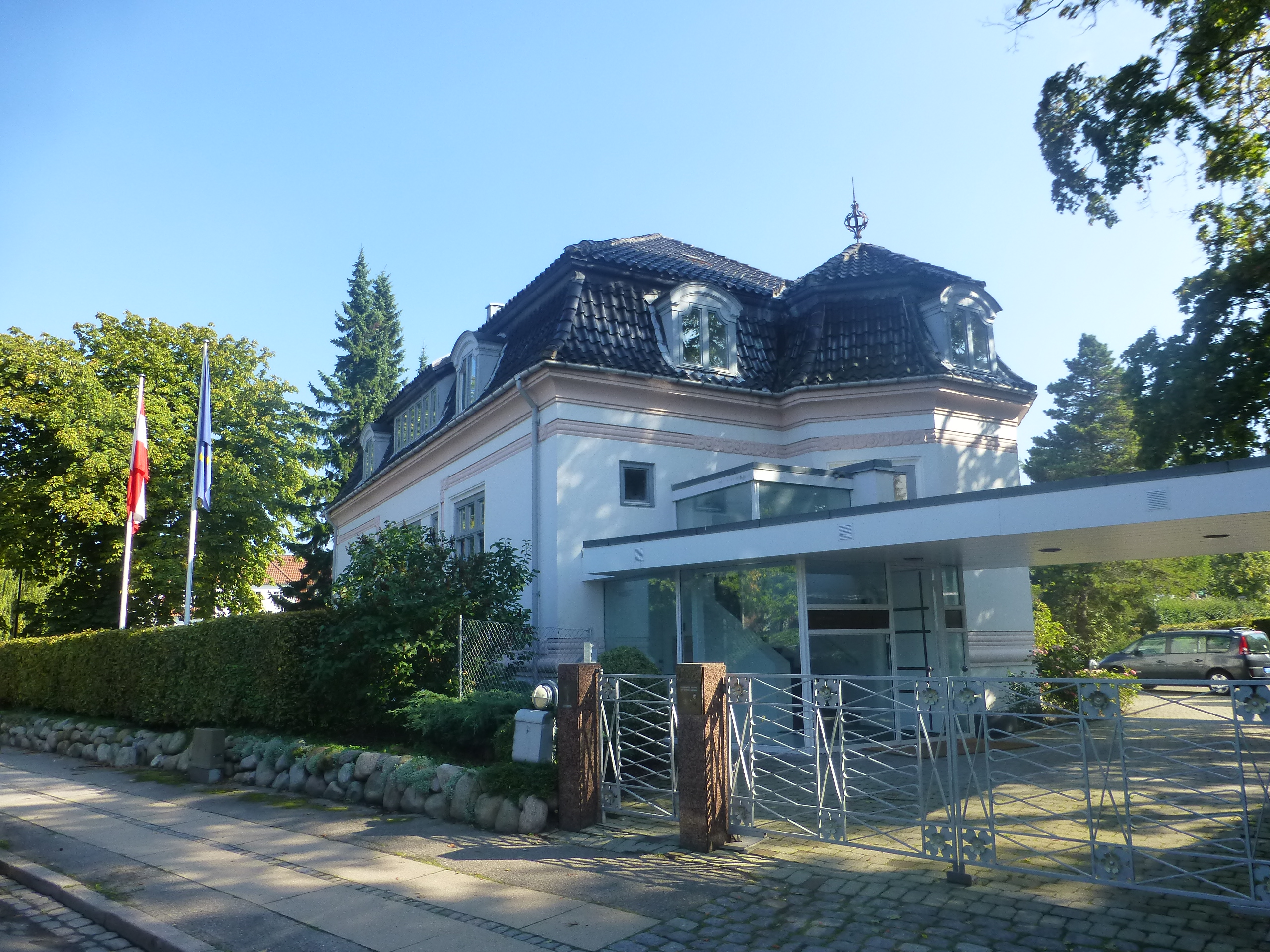
Embassy in Copenhagen

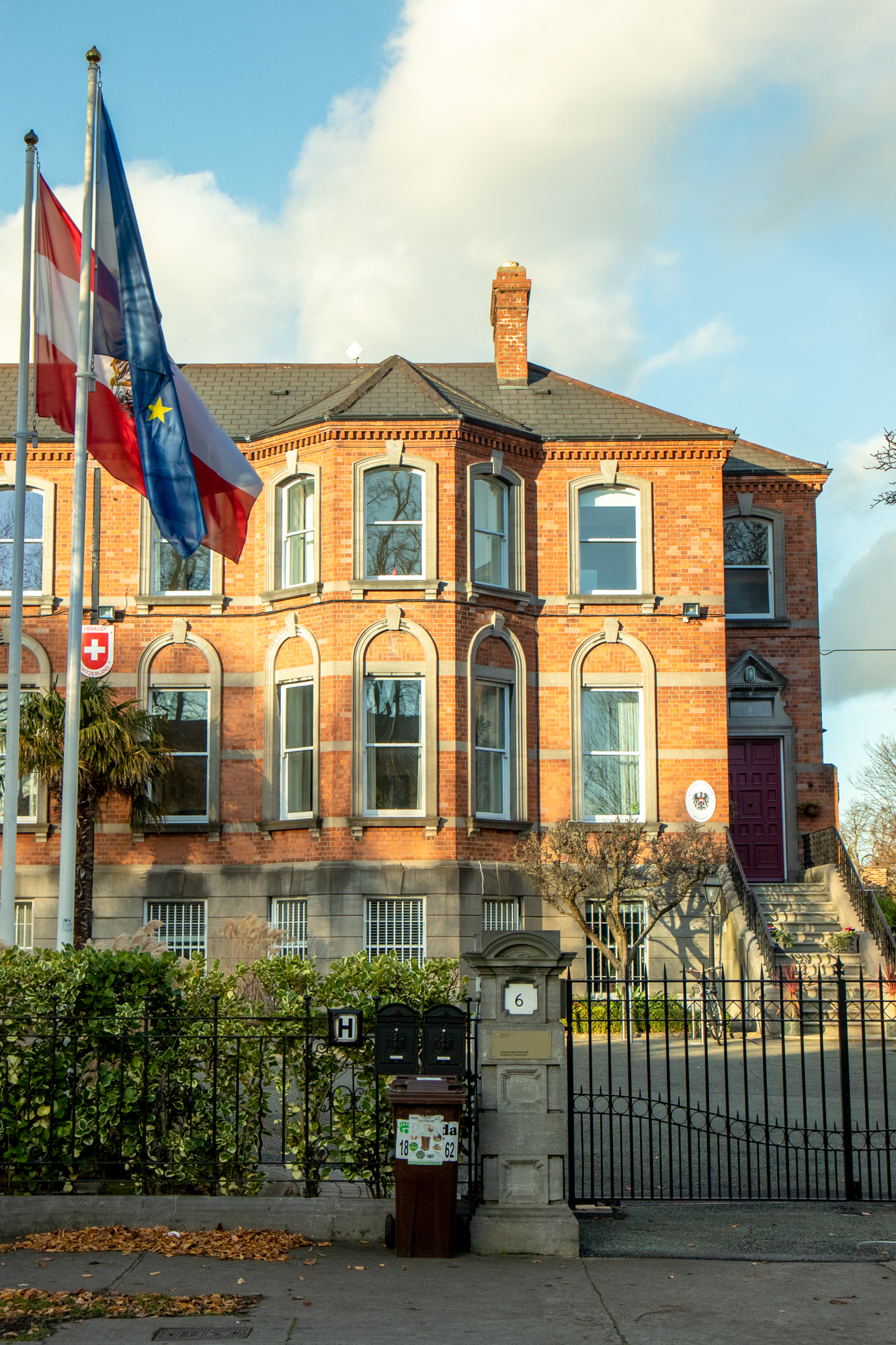
Embassy in Dublin

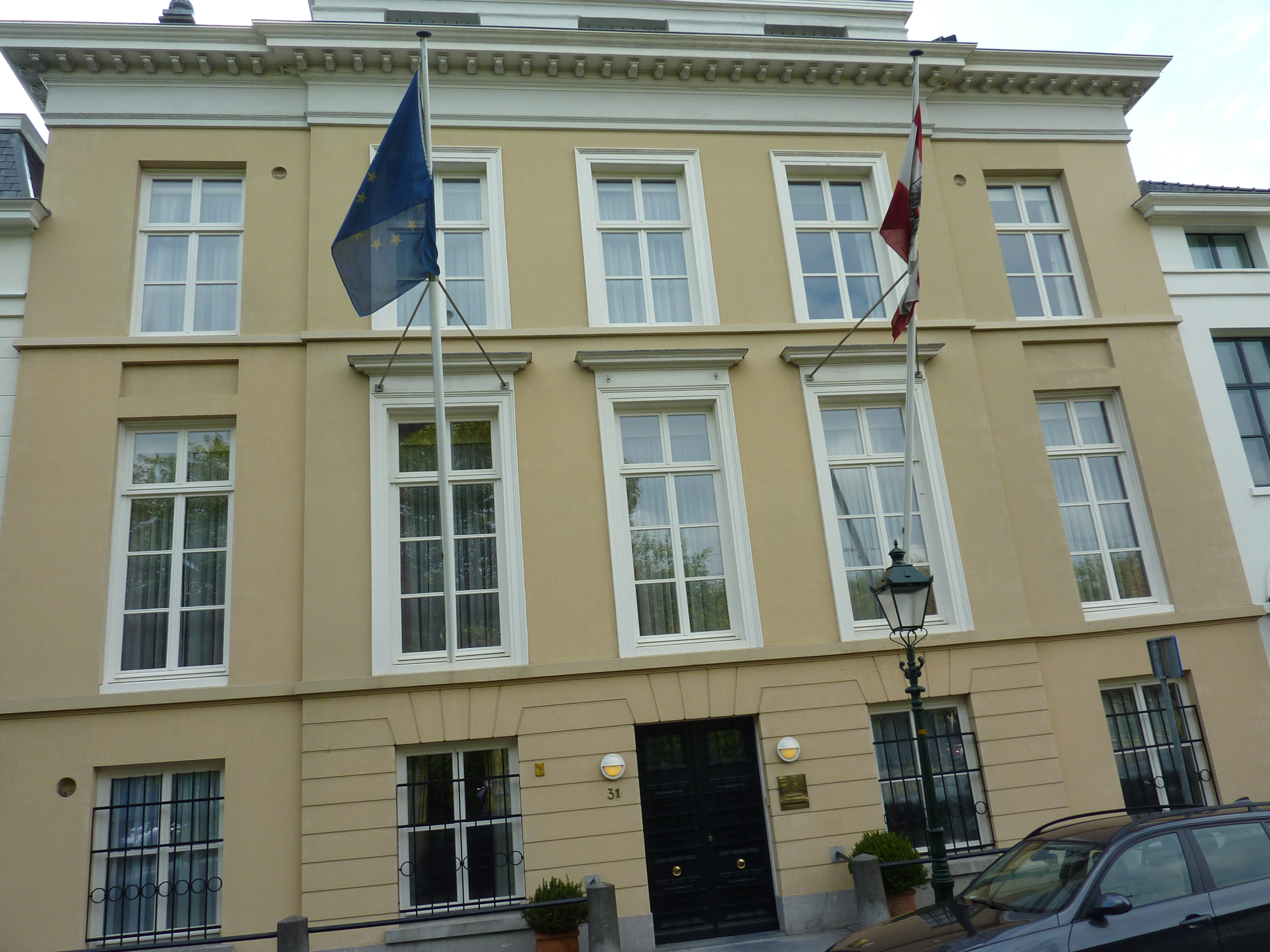
Embassy in The Hague

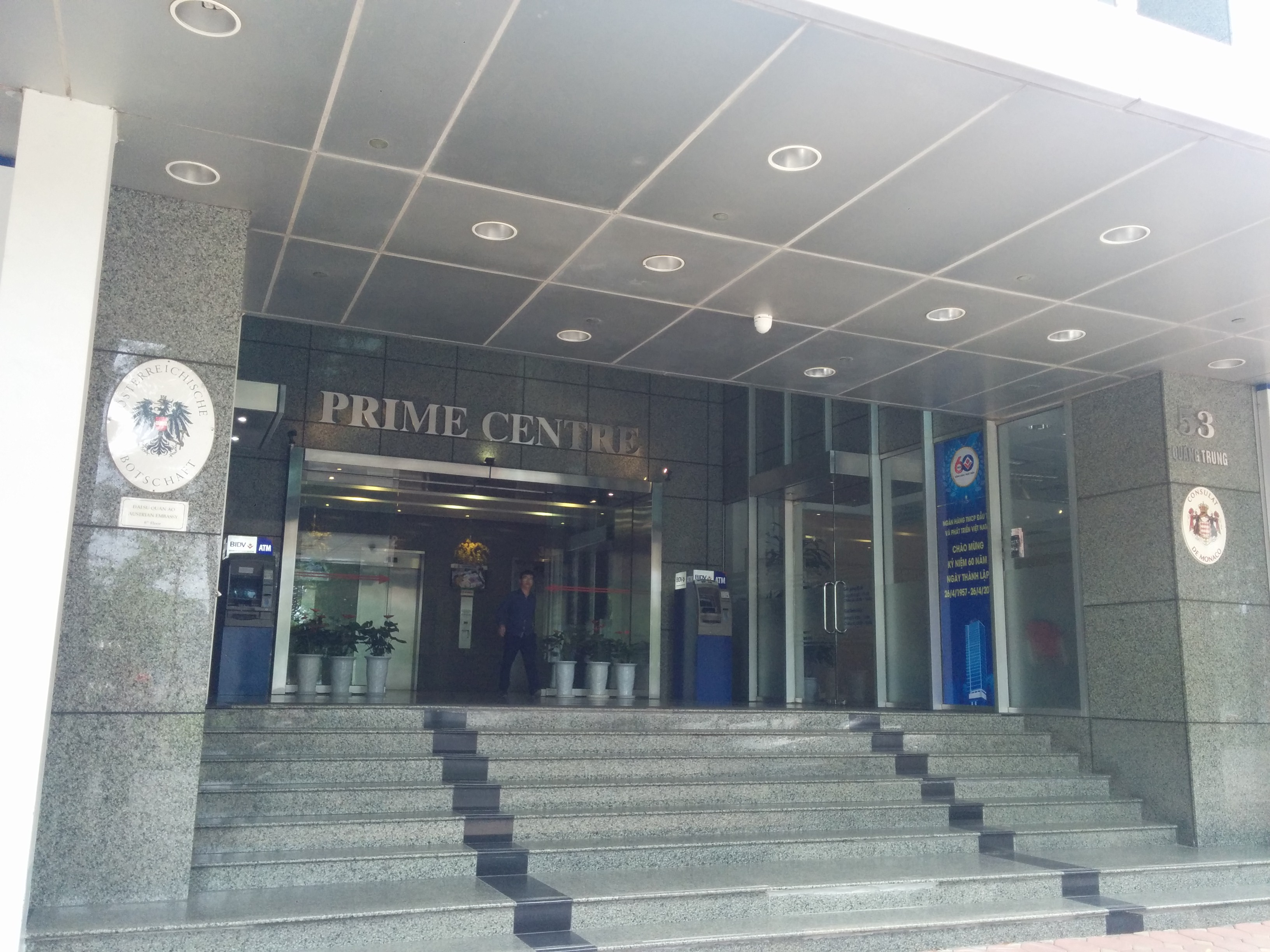
Embassy in Hanoi

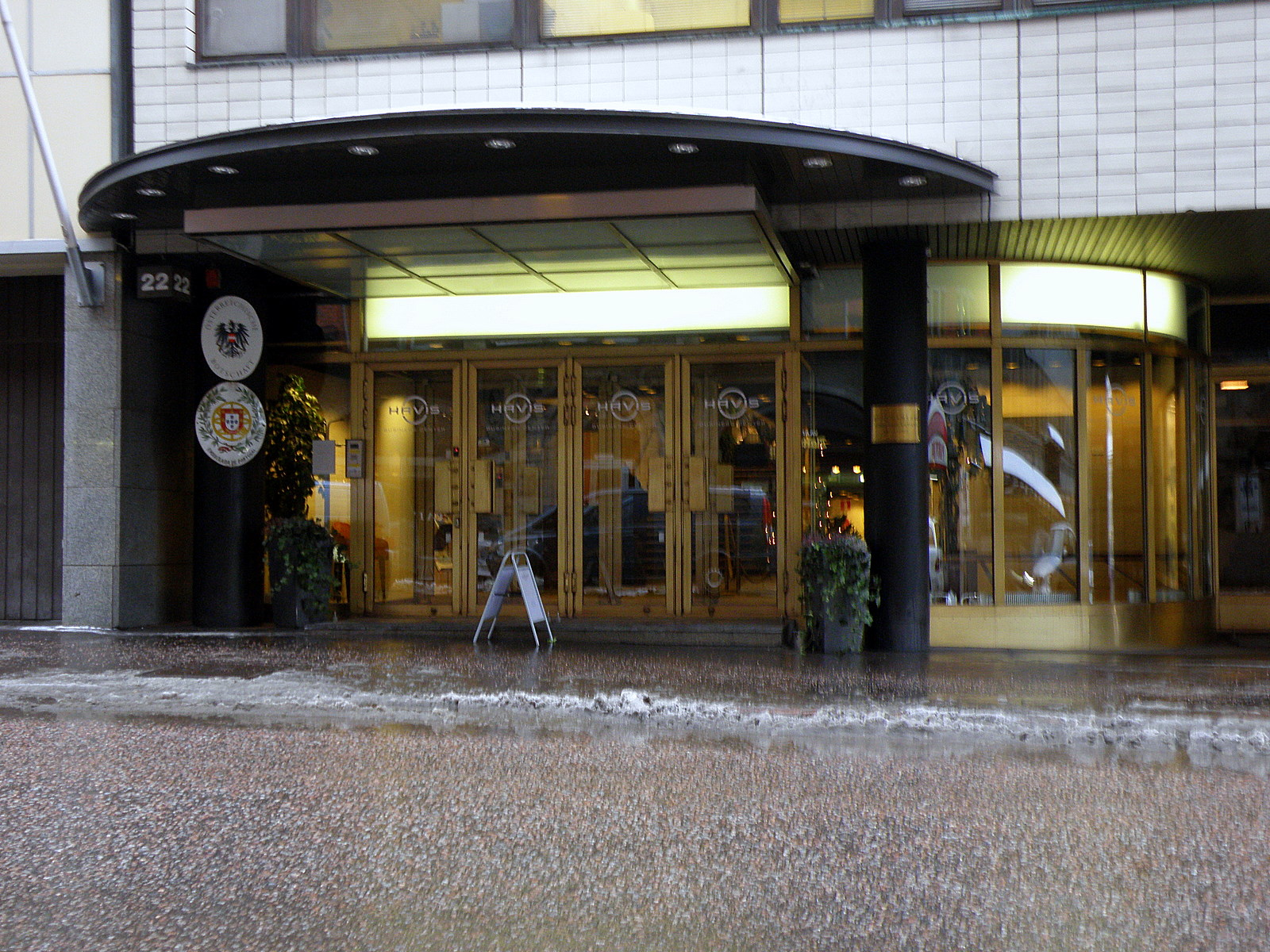
Embassy in Helsinki

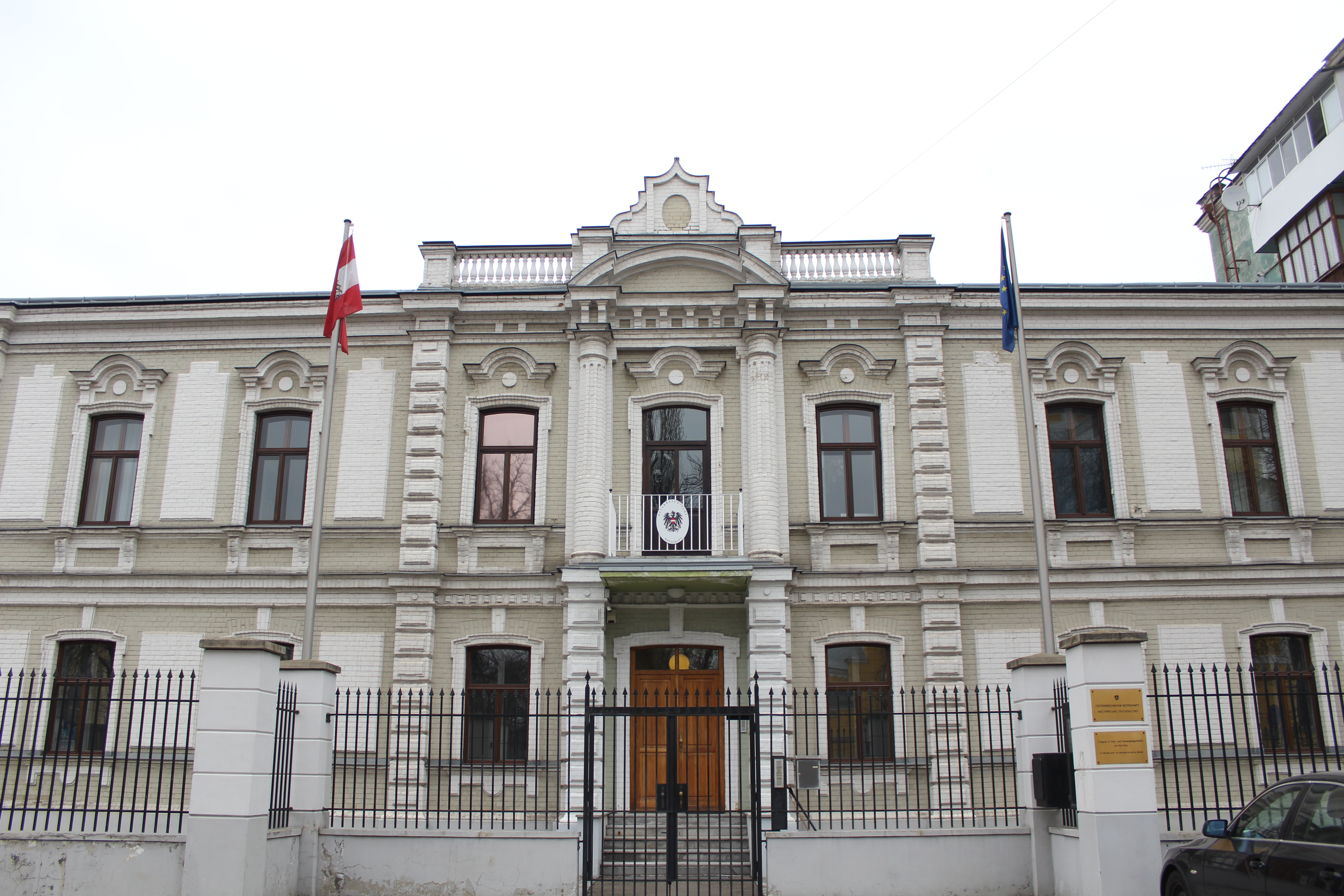
Embassy in Kyiv

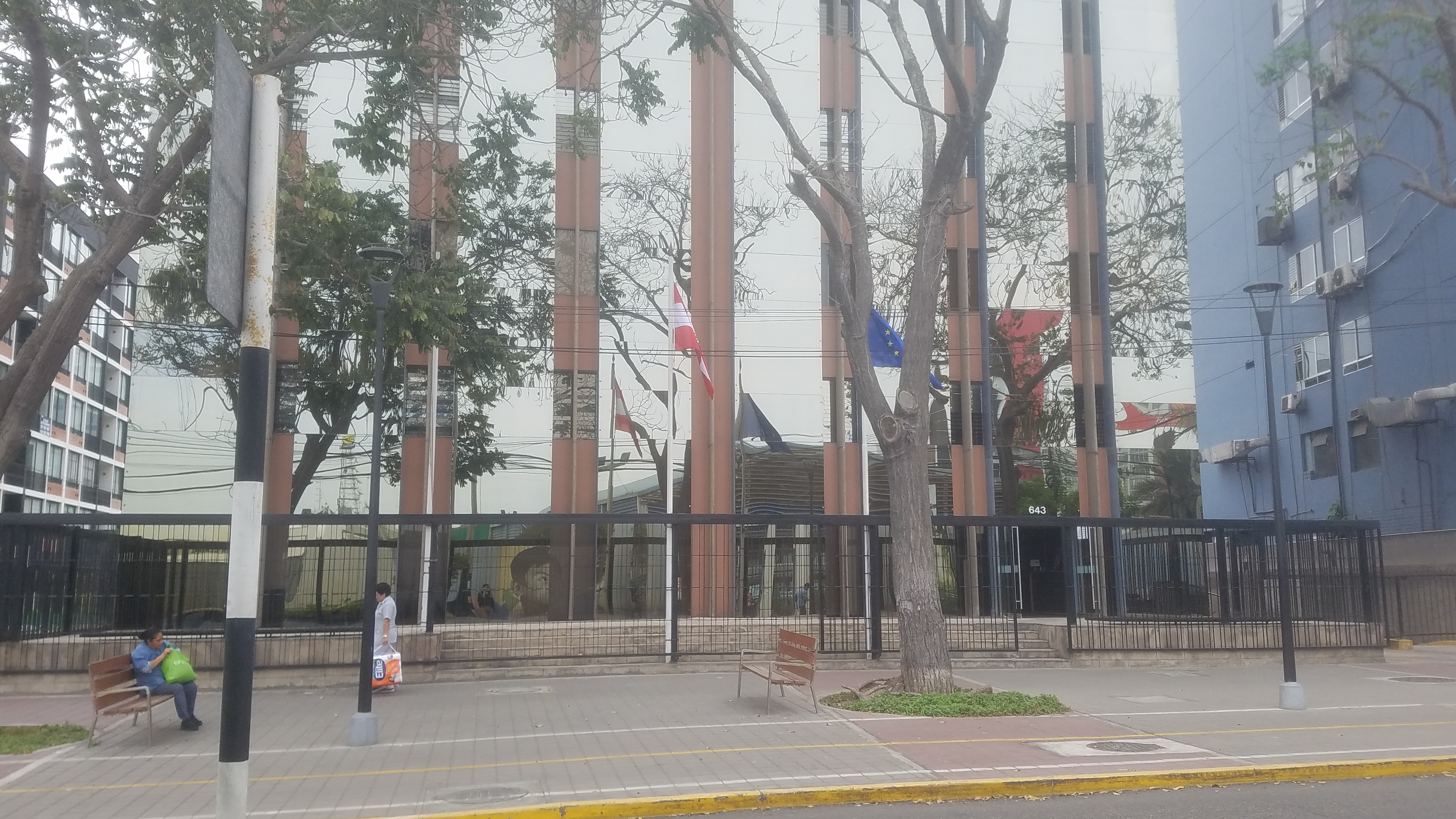
Embassy in Lima

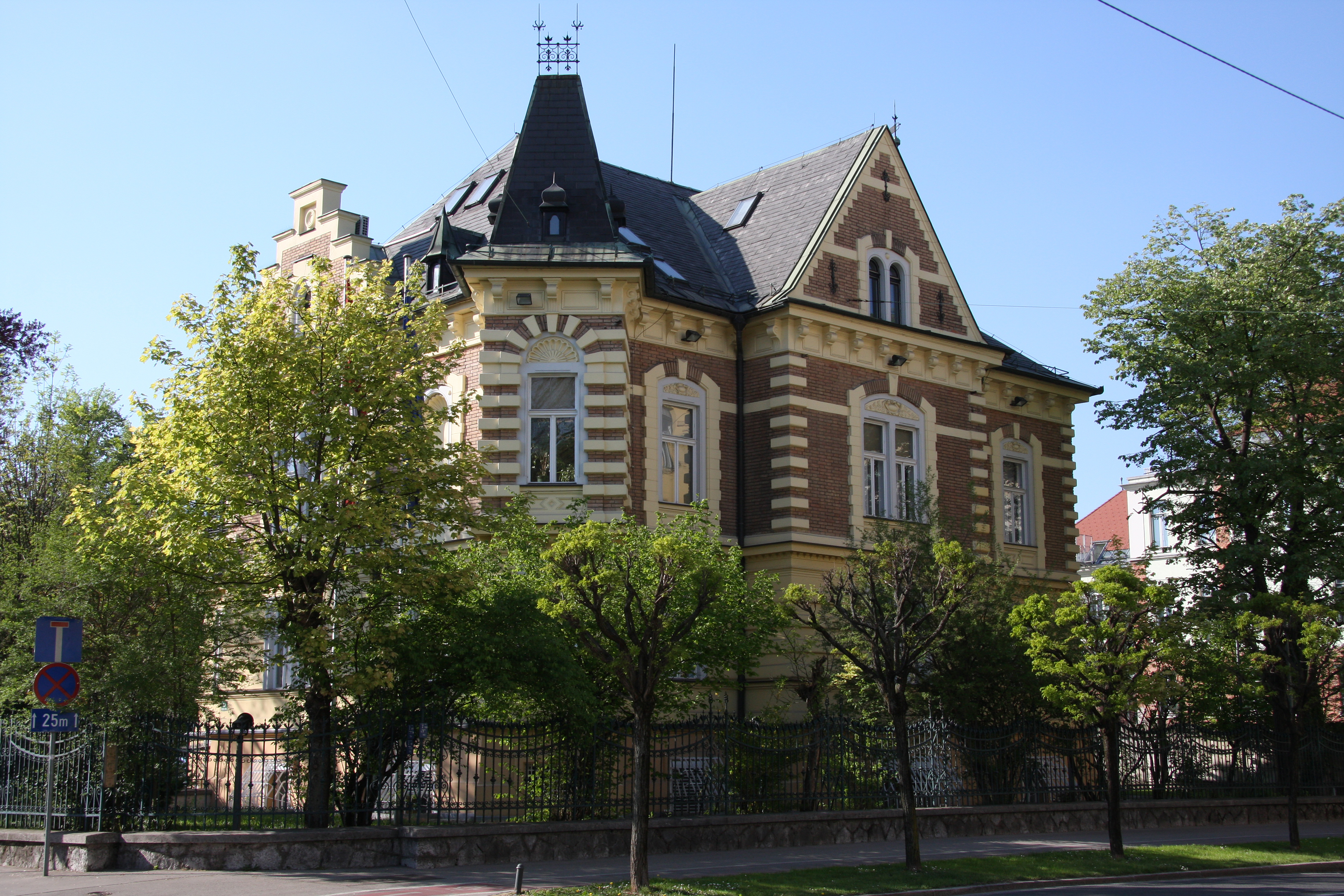
Embassy in Ljubljana

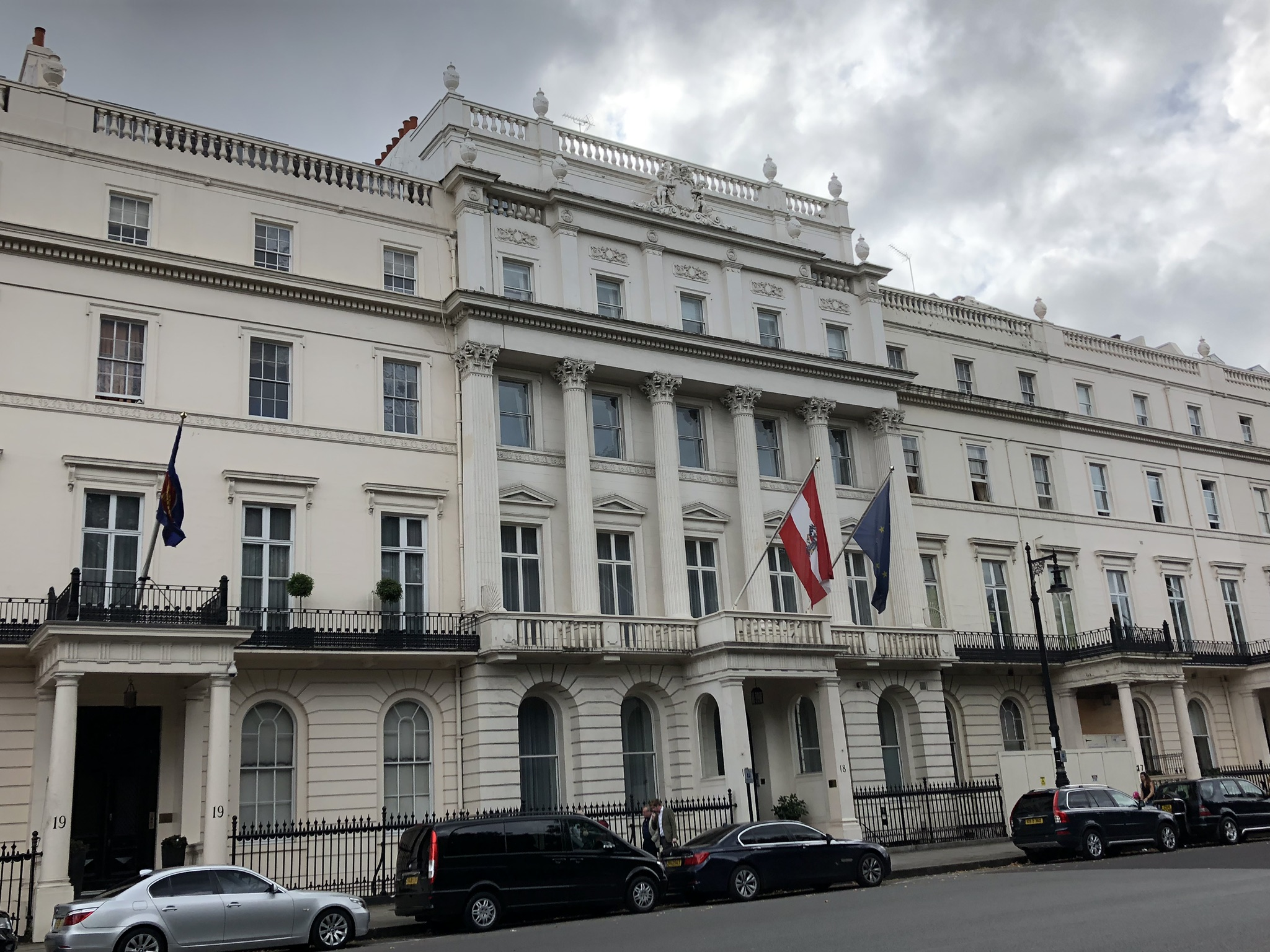
Embassy in London

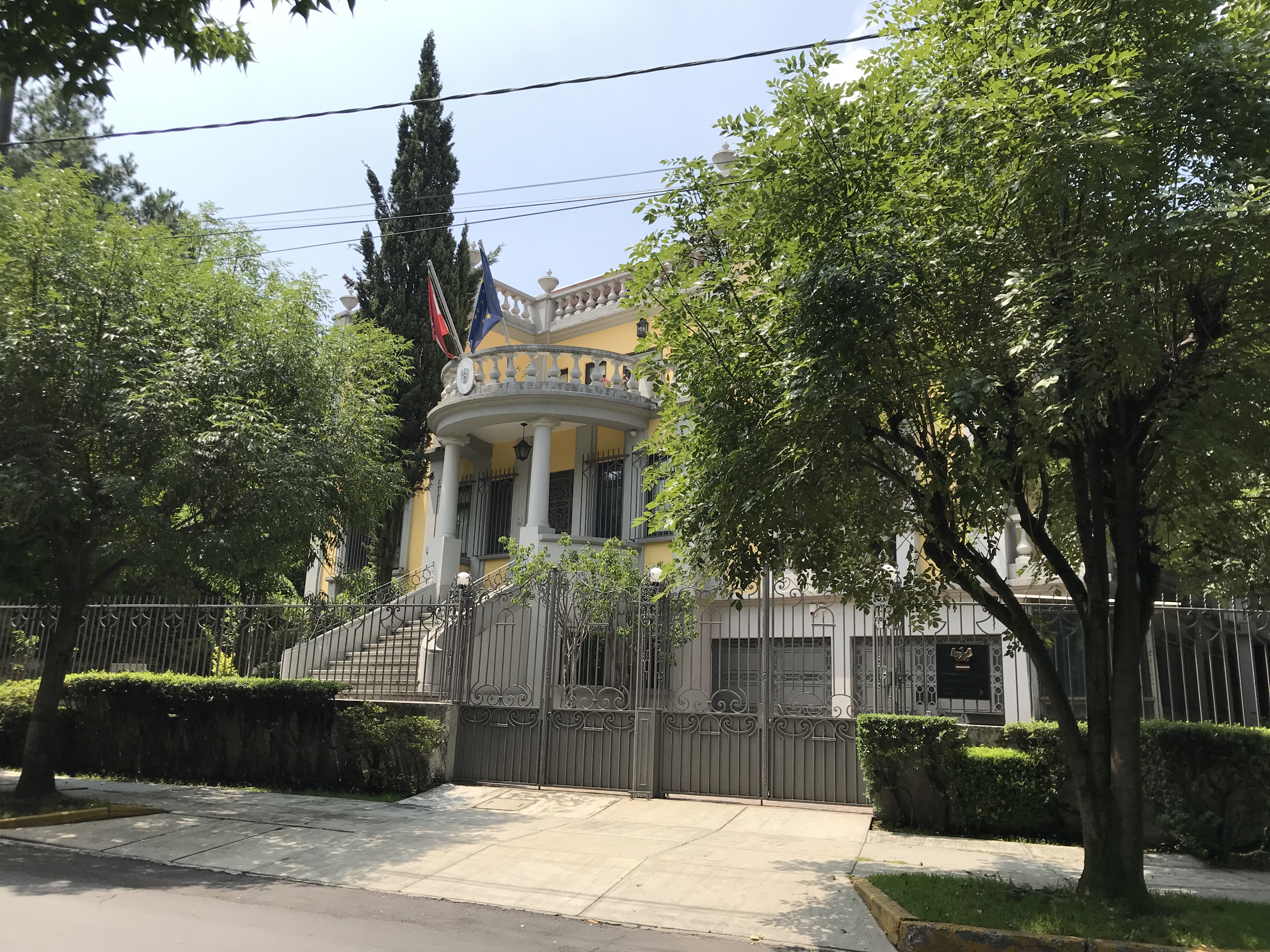
Embassy in Mexico City

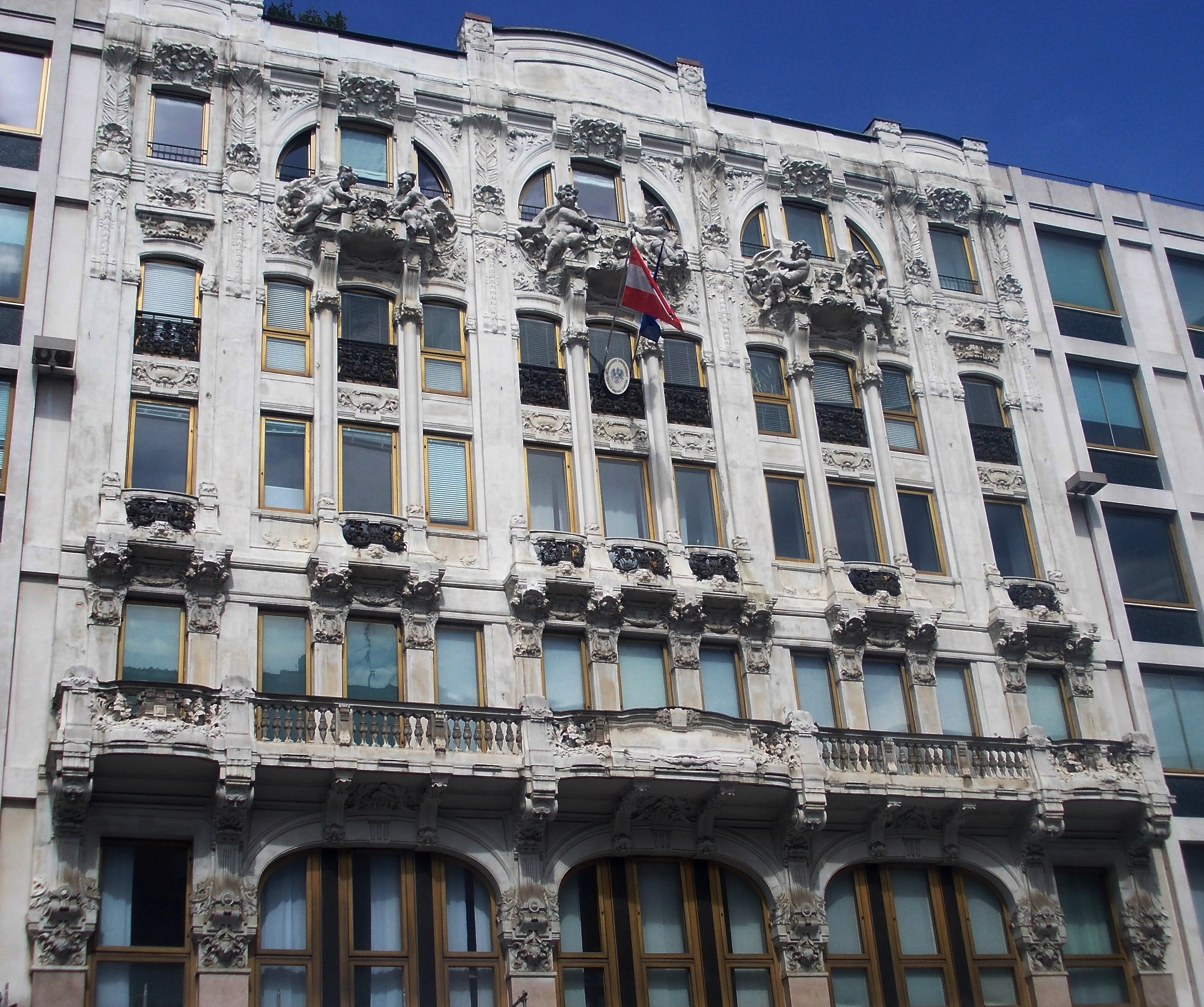
Consulate-General in Milan

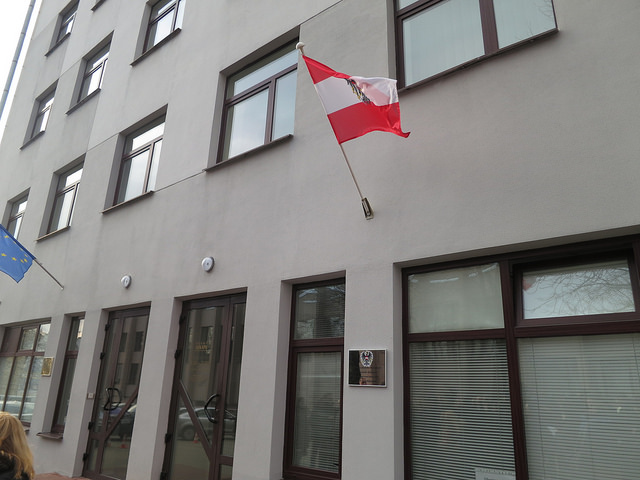
Embassy in Minsk

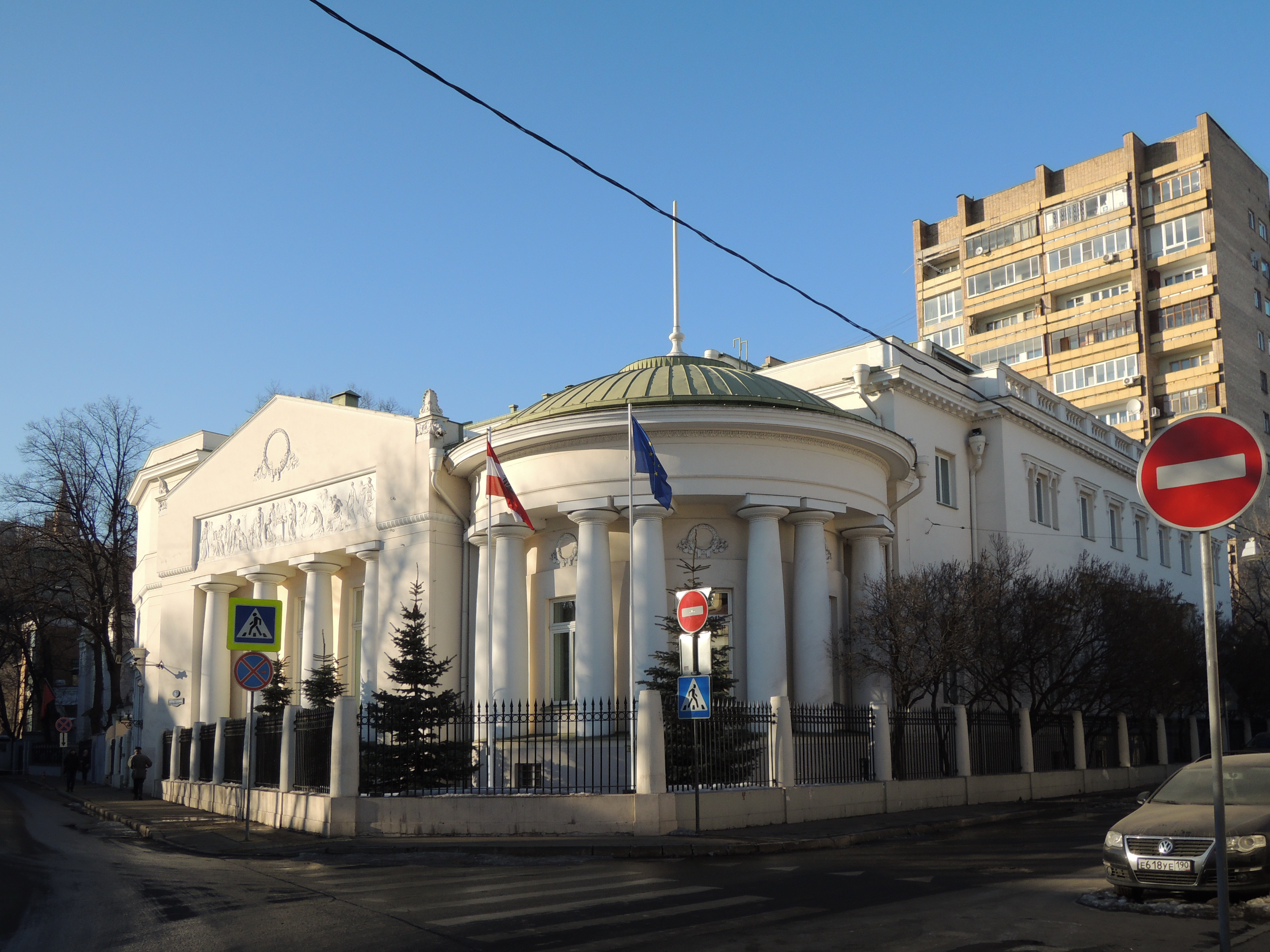
Embassy in Moscow

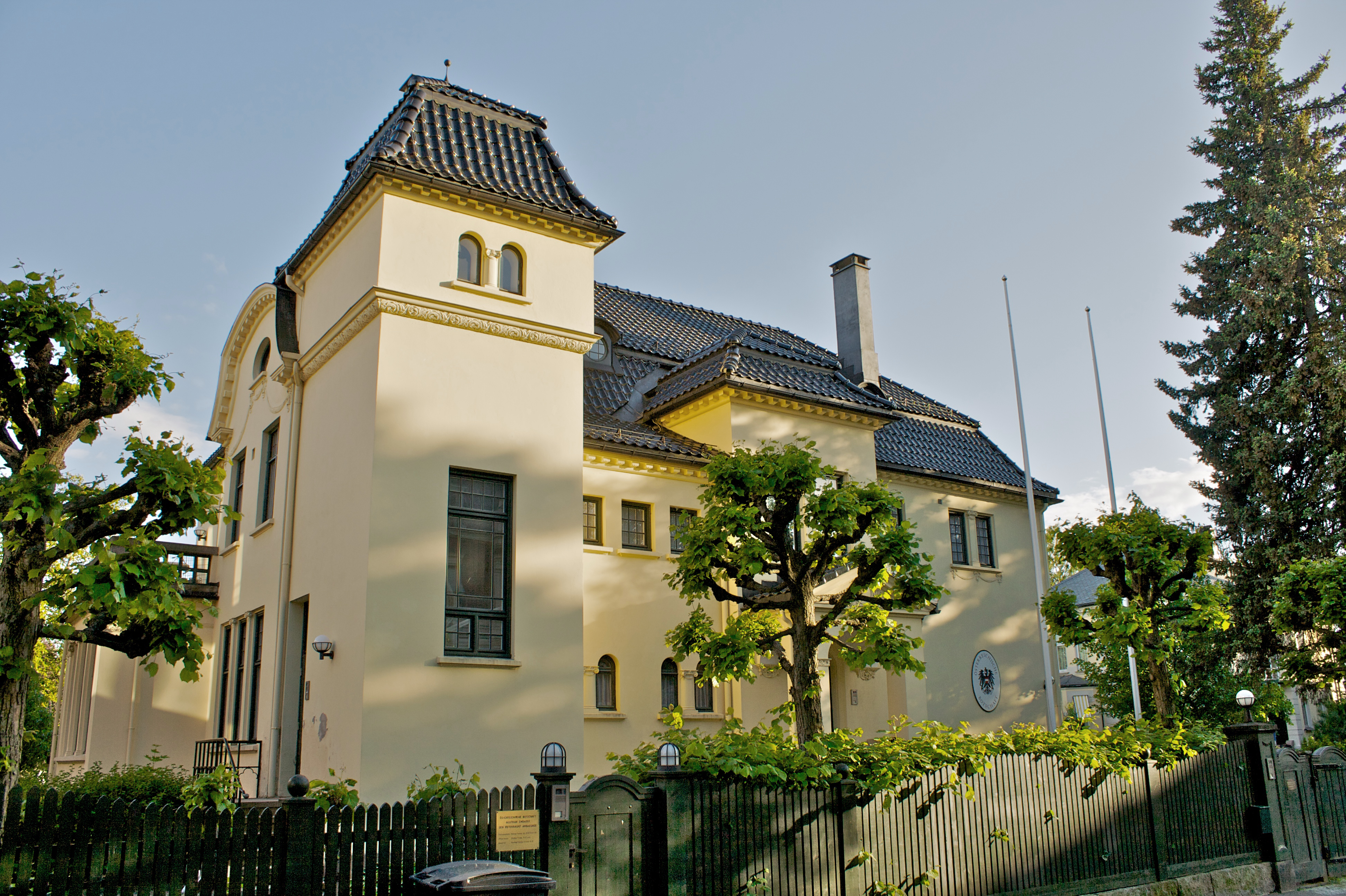
Embassy in Oslo

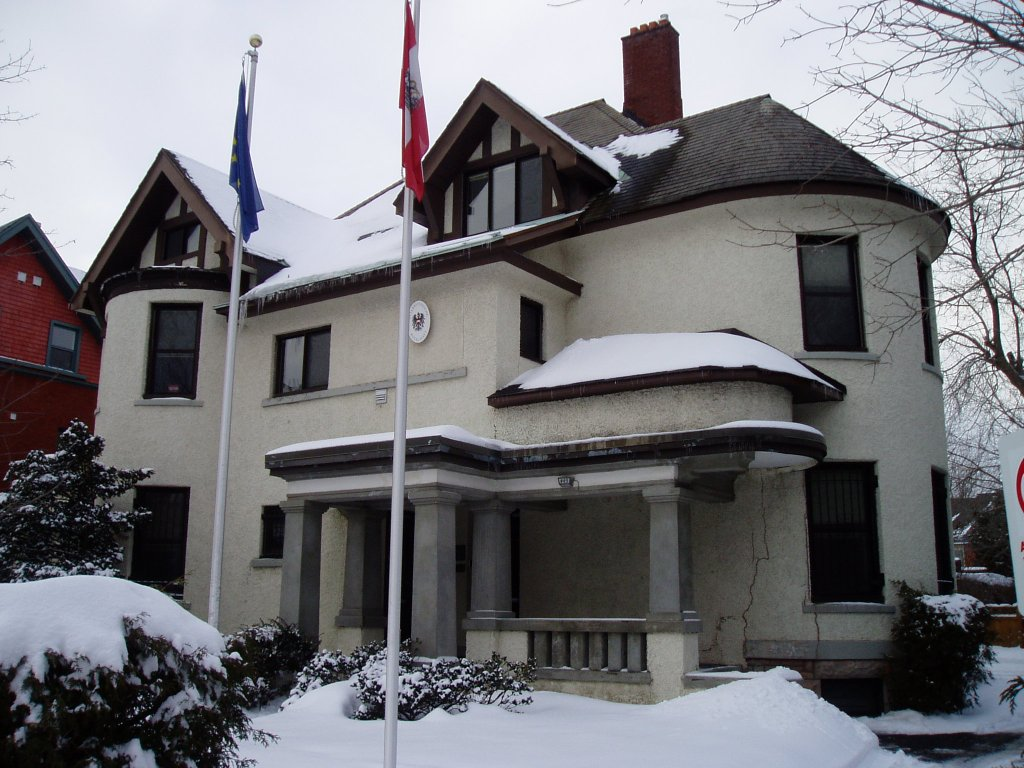
Embassy in Ottawa

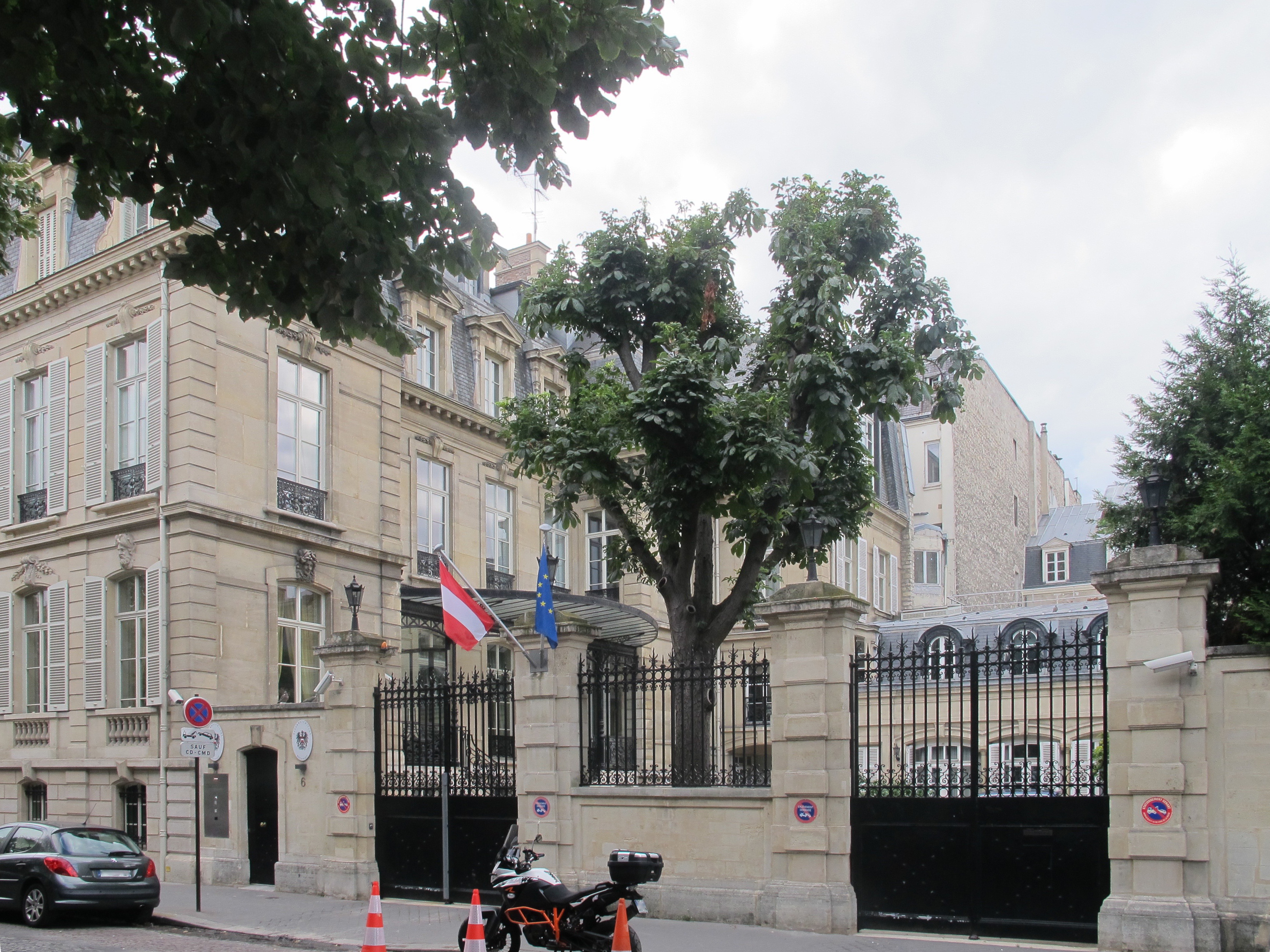
Embassy in Paris

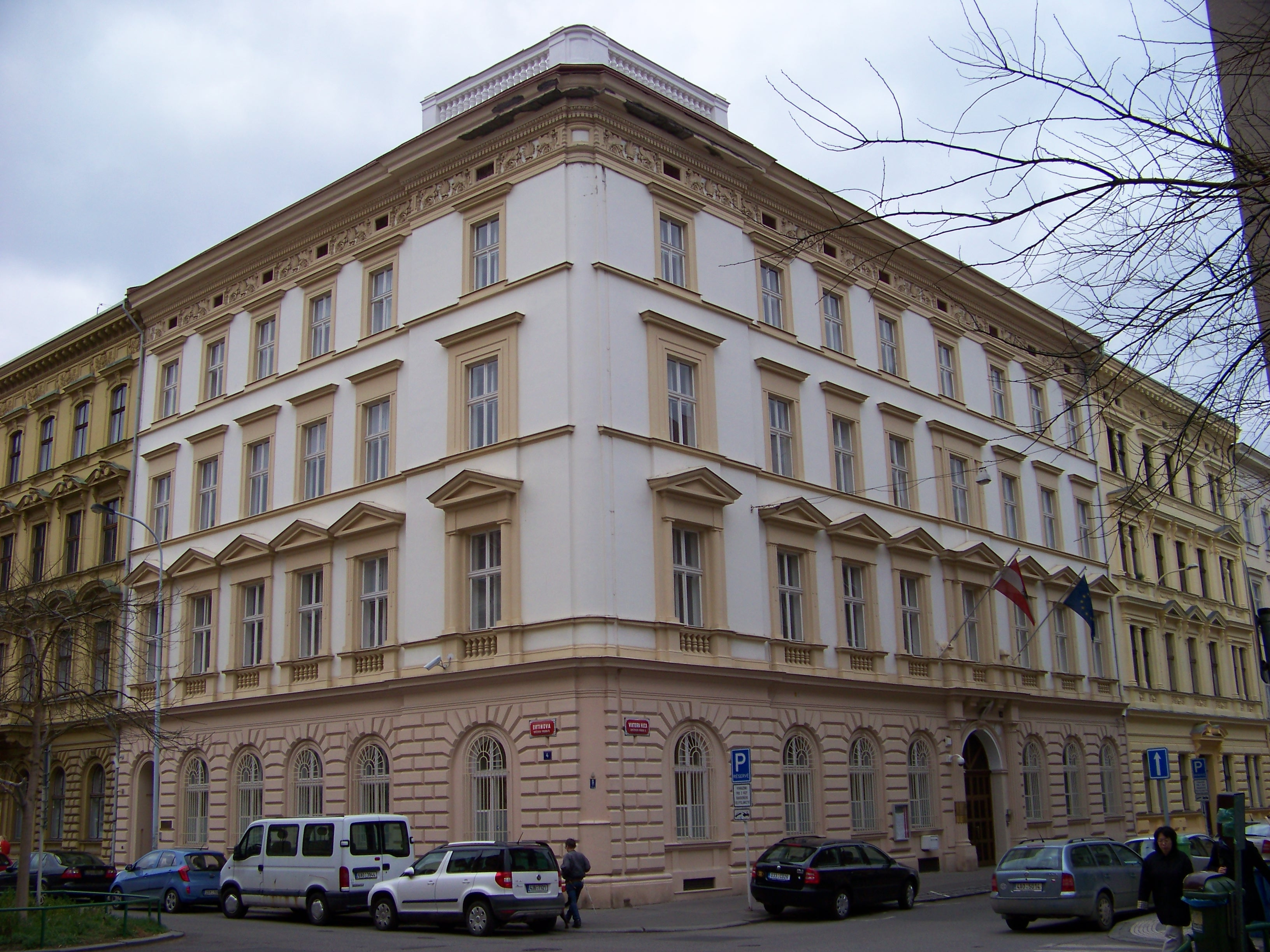
Embassy in Prague

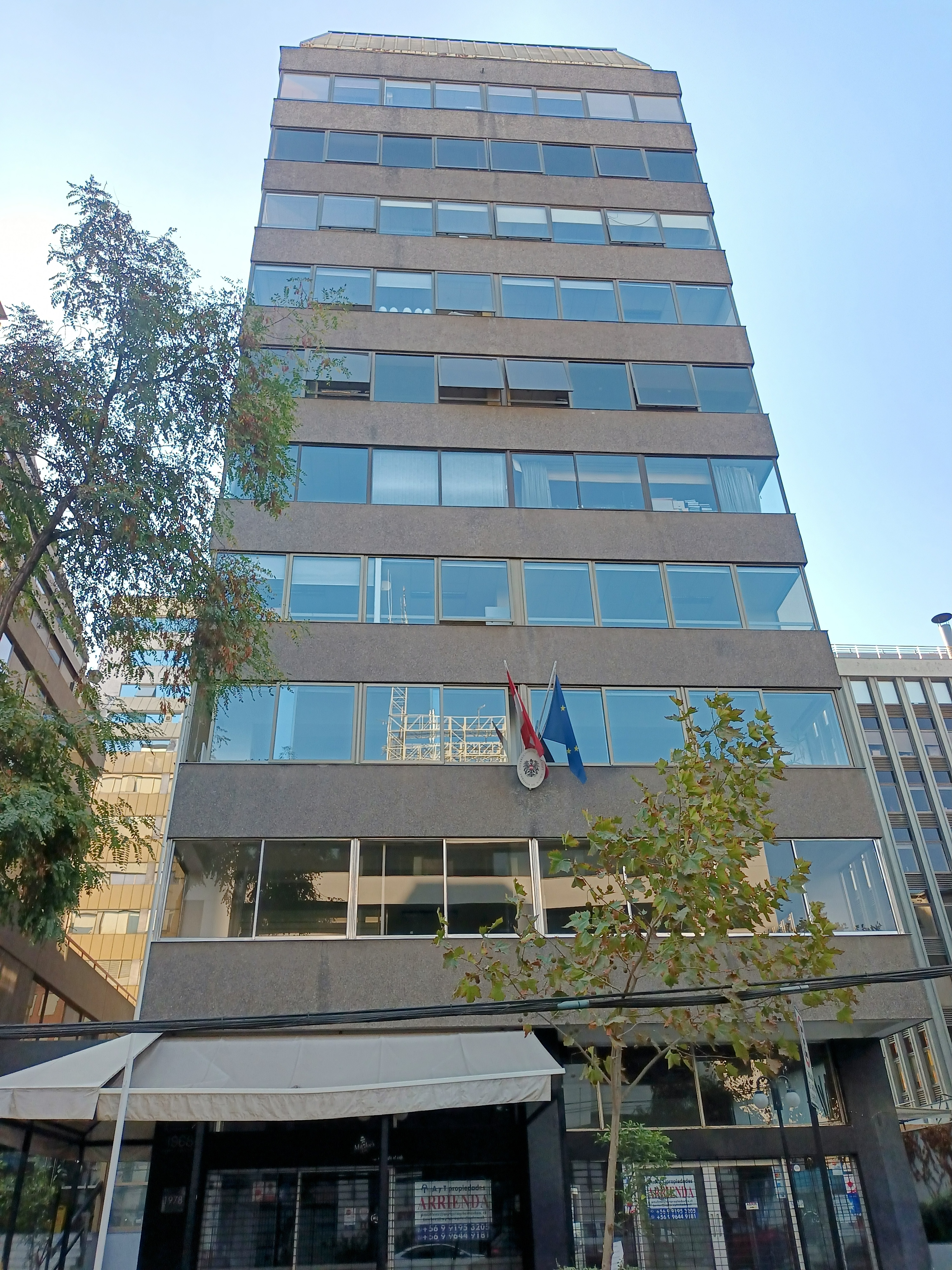
Building hosting the Embassy in Santiago de Chile

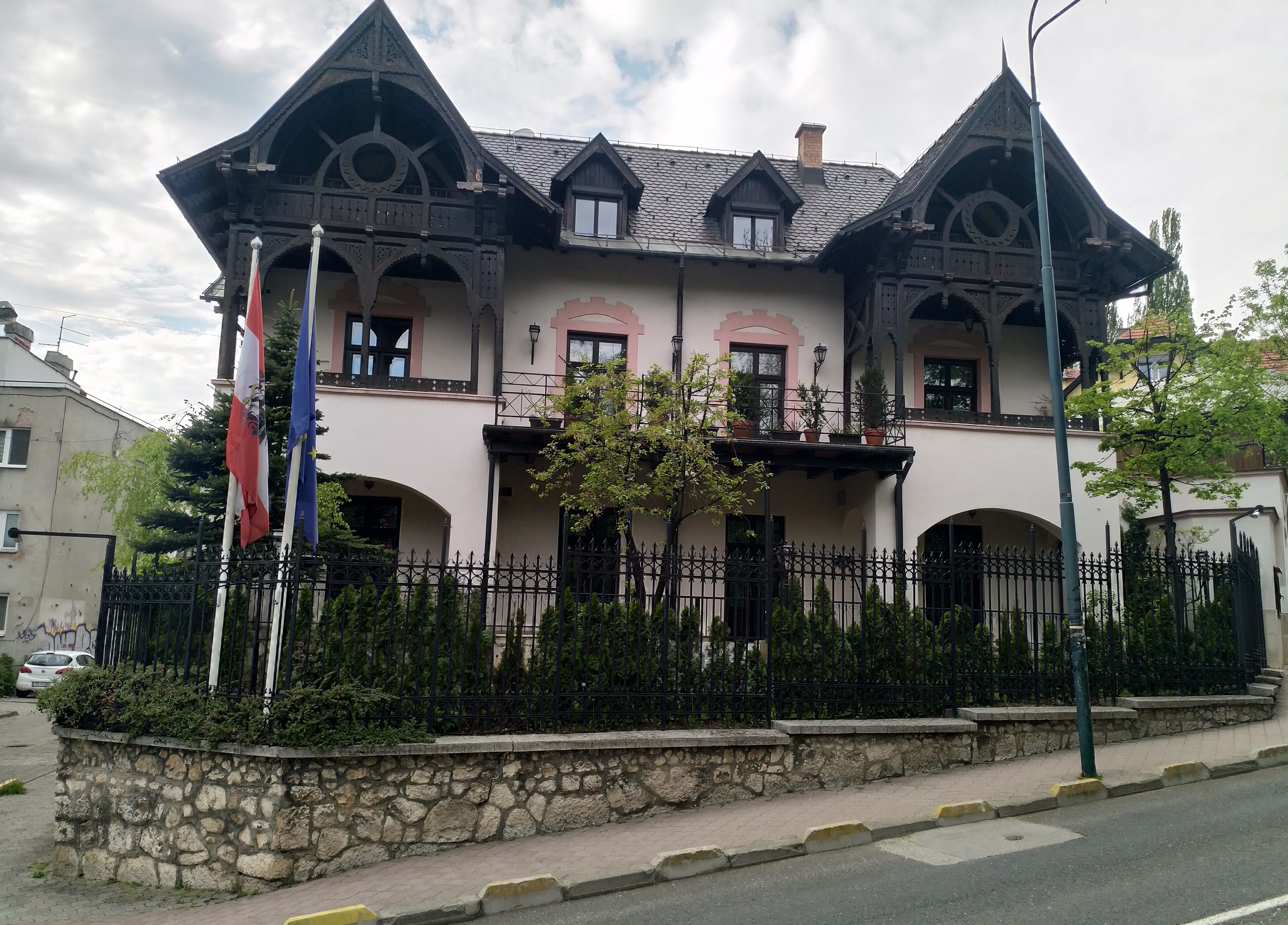
Embassy in Sarajevo

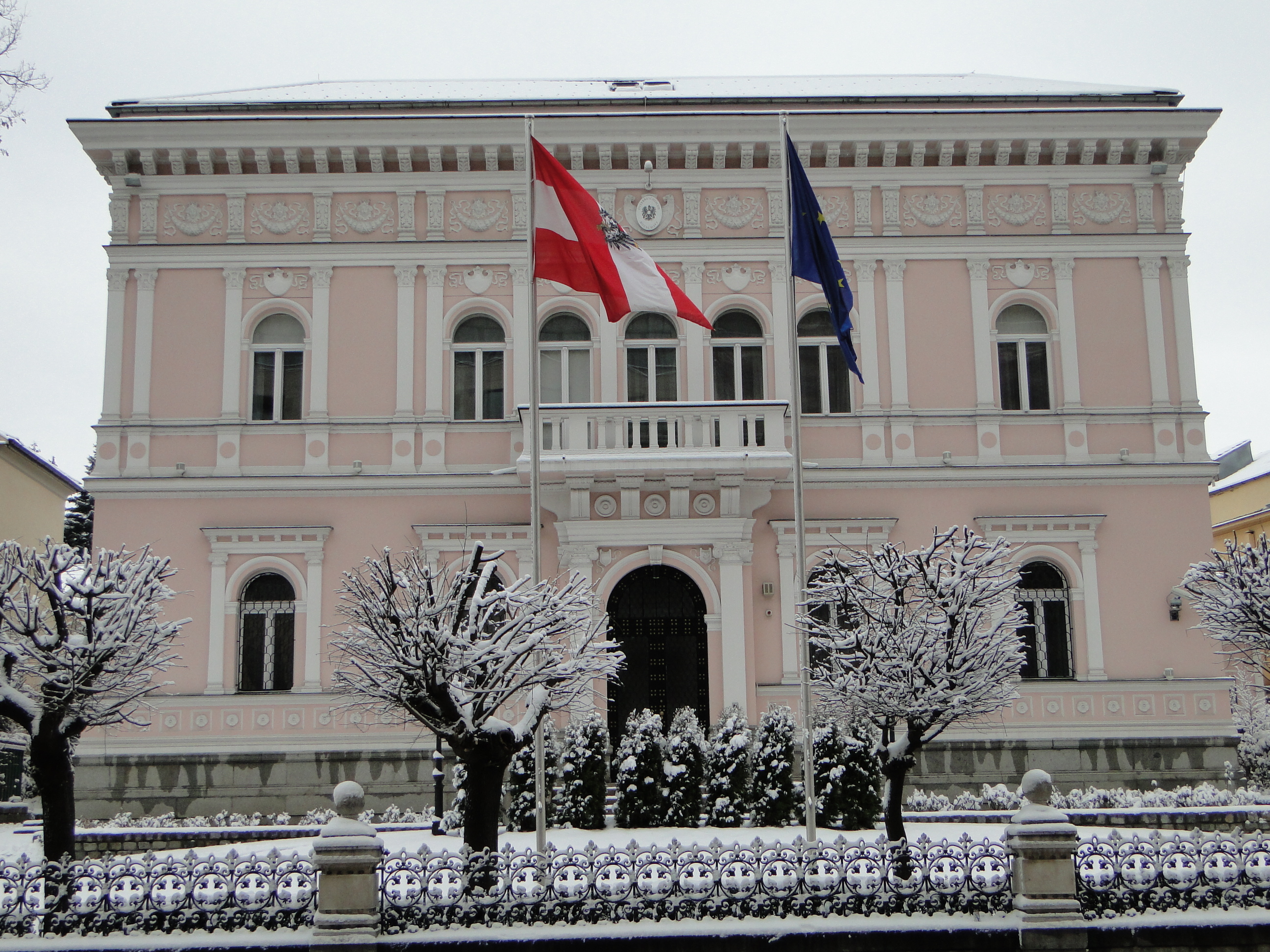
Embassy in Sofia

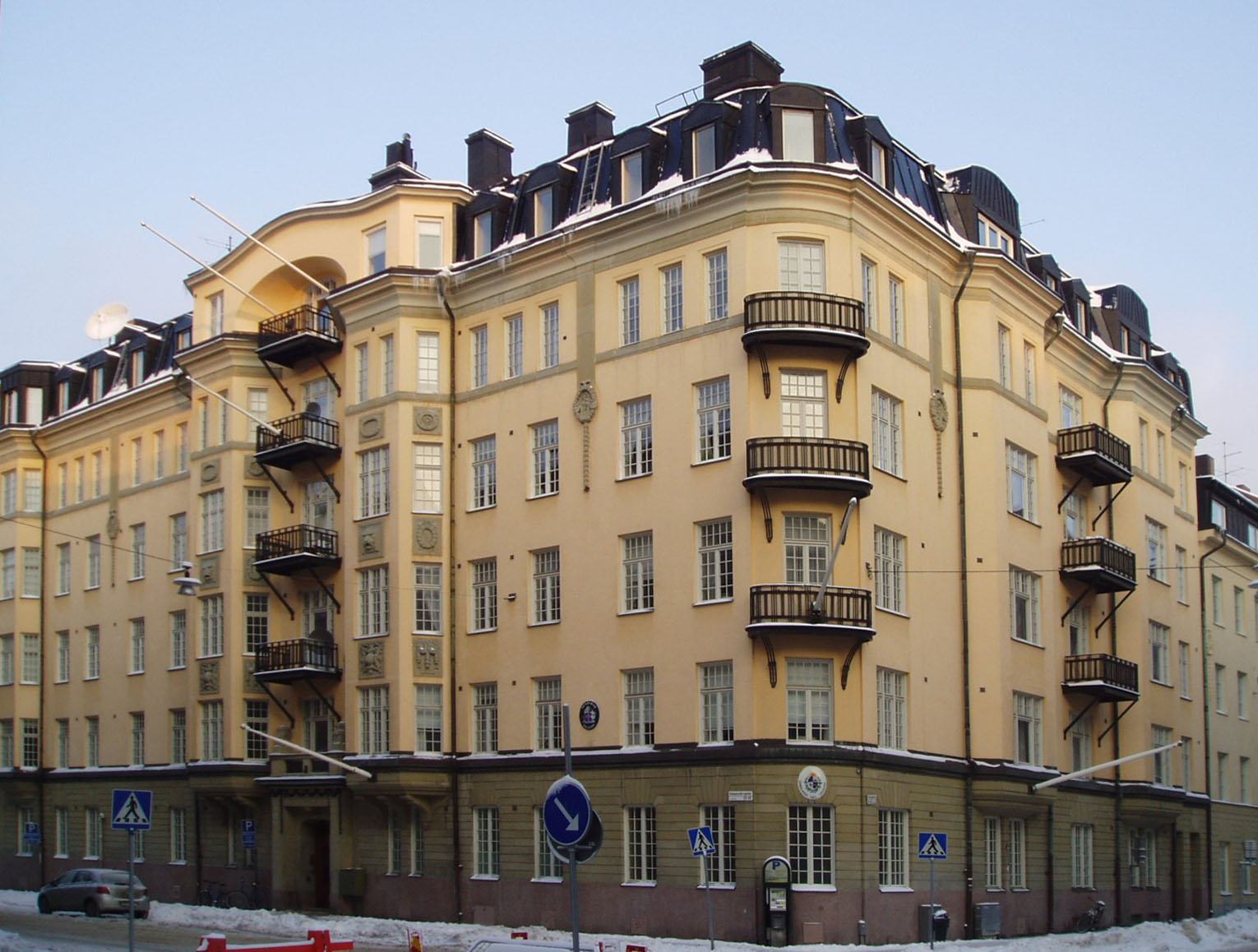
Embassy in Stockholm

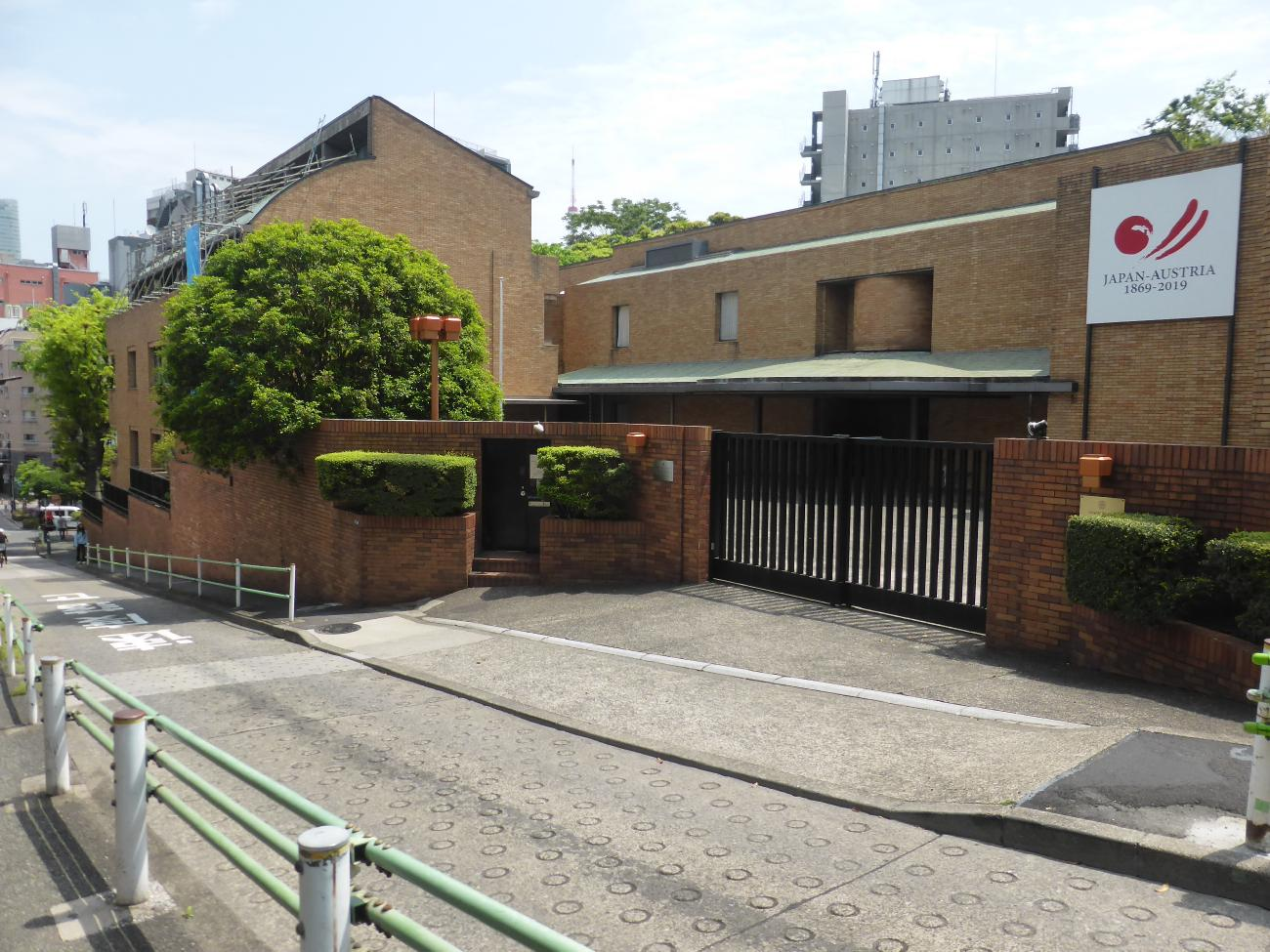
Embassy in Tokyo

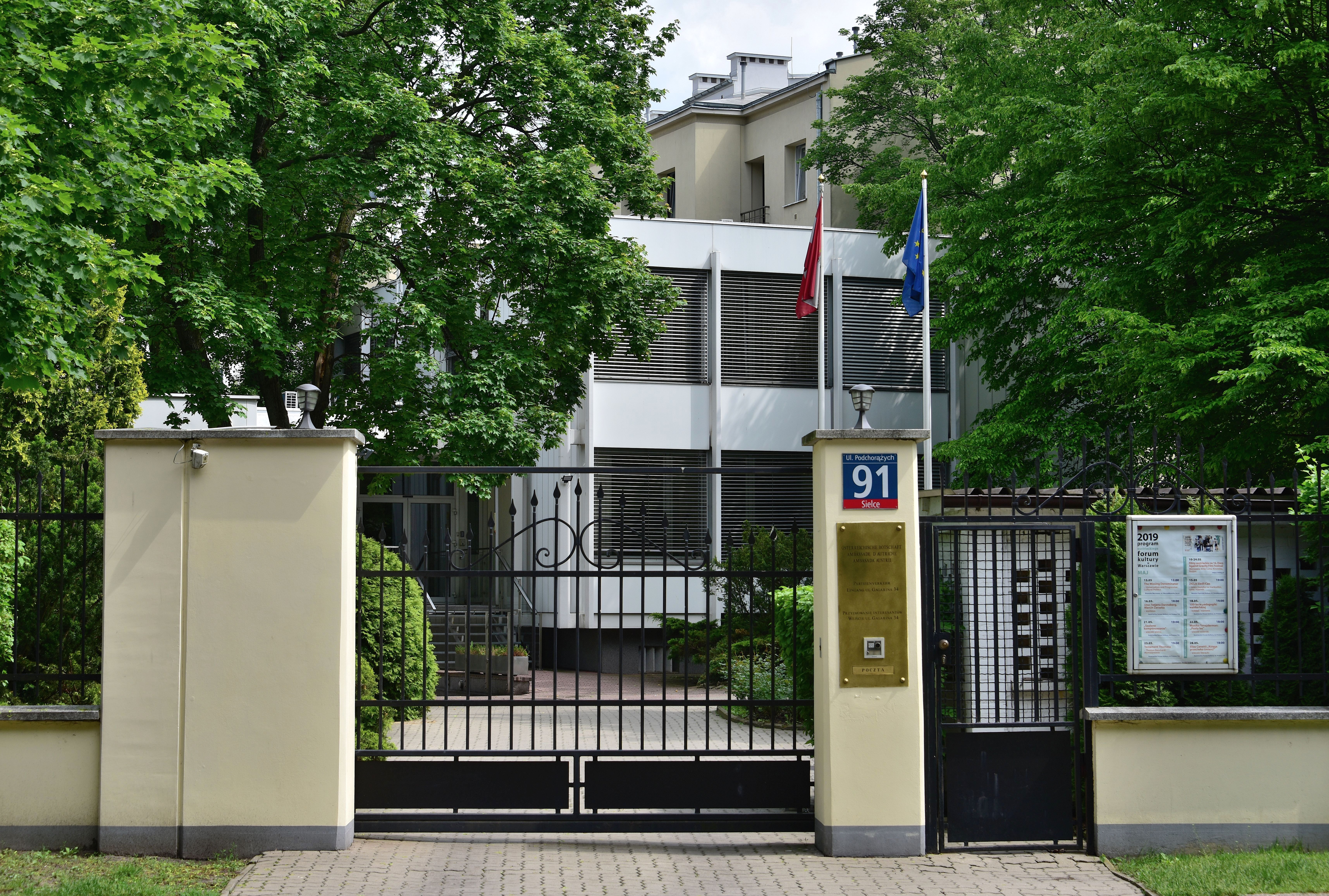
Embassy in Warsaw

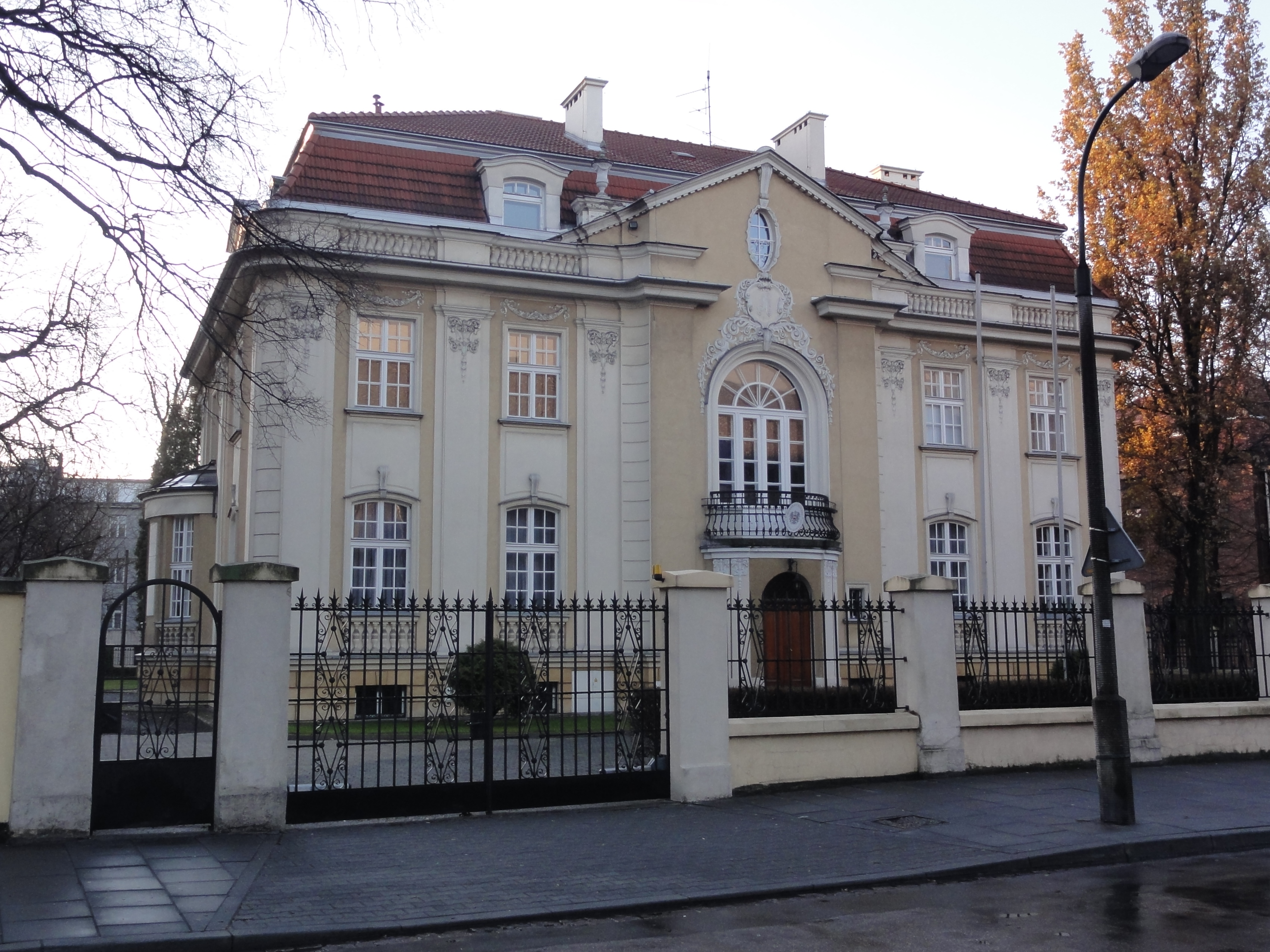
Consulate-General in Kraków

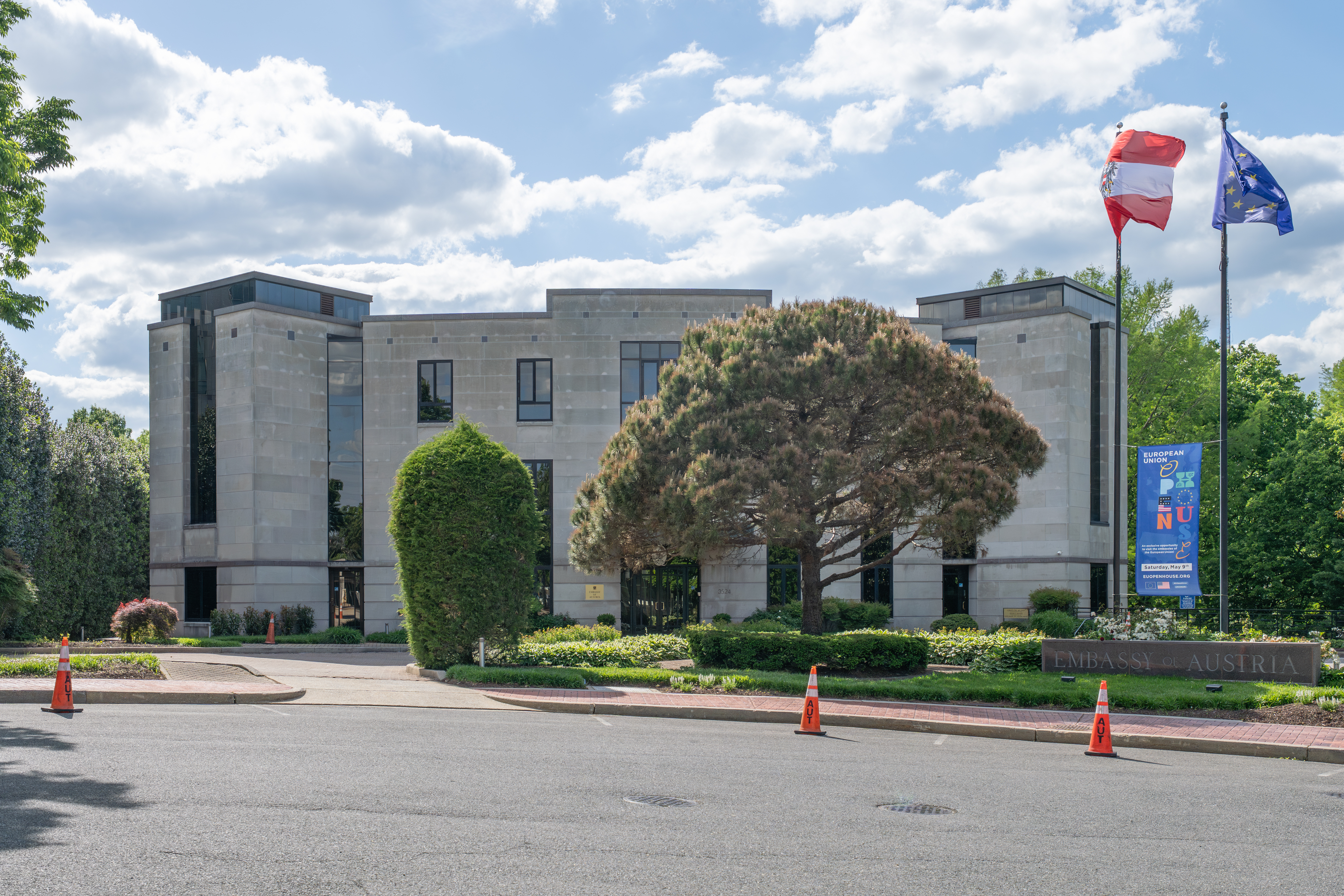
Embassy in Washington, D.C.

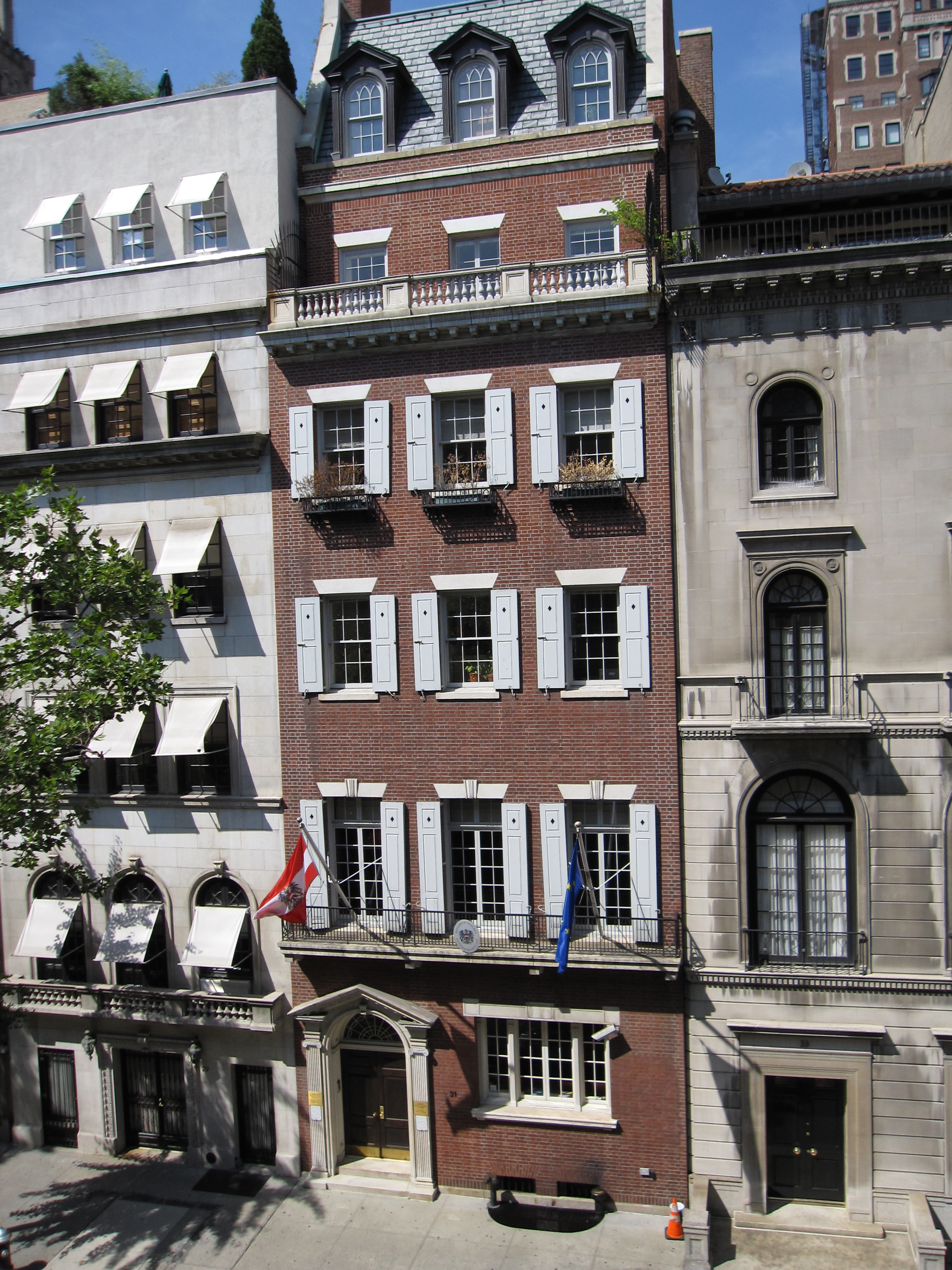
Consulate-General in New York City

== Closed missions ==
=== Africa ===
Host country	Host city	Mission	Year closed	Ref.
Ivory Coast	Abidjan	Embassy	1994	
Zaire (Note: The embassy closed down prior to the renaming of the Republic of Zaire into the Democratic Republic of the Congo in 1997.)	Kinshasa	Embassy	1993	
Zambia	Lusaka	Embassy	1989	
South Africa	Cape Town	Consulate-General	Unknown	
Zimbabwe	Harare	Embassy	2015	

=== Americas ===
Host country	Host city	Mission	Year closed	Ref.
Brazil	Rio de Janeiro	Consulate-General	Unknown	
United States	Chicago	Consulate-General	2013	
Venezuela	Caracas	Embassy	2018	

=== Europe ===
Host country	Host city	Mission	Year closed	Ref.
Germany	Bonn	Embassy branch office	2006	
Germany	Düsseldorf	Consulate-General	2002	
Germany	Hamburg	Consulate-General	2010	
Lithuania	Vilnius	Embassy	2016	
Malta	Valletta	Embassy	2015	
Switzerland	Zürich	Consulate-General	2011	

== See also ==
- Foreign relations of Austria
- List of diplomatic missions in Austria
- Visa policy of the Schengen Area
