= Near North Side, Chicago =

Community area in Chicago, Illinois

Near North Side
- Community area
- Community Area 08 – Near North Side
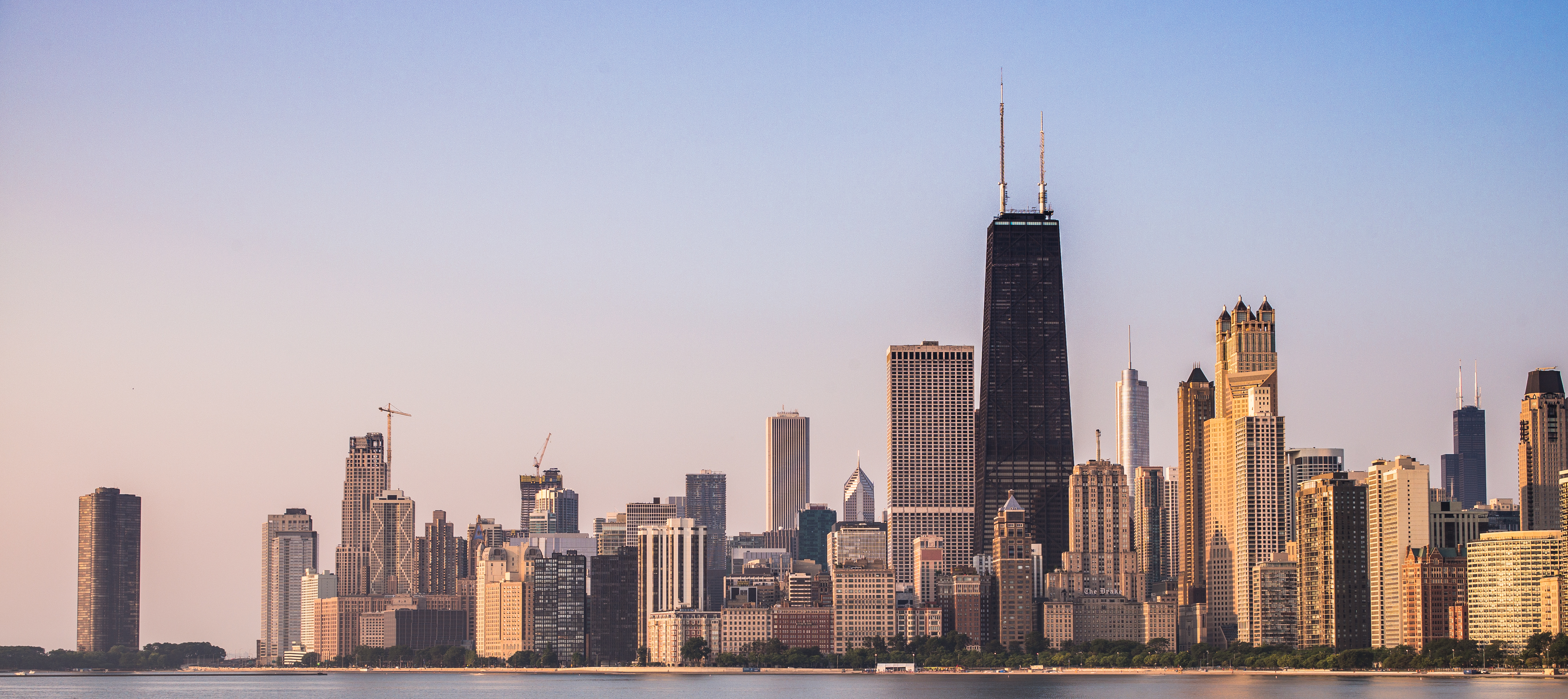
- Near North Side skyline

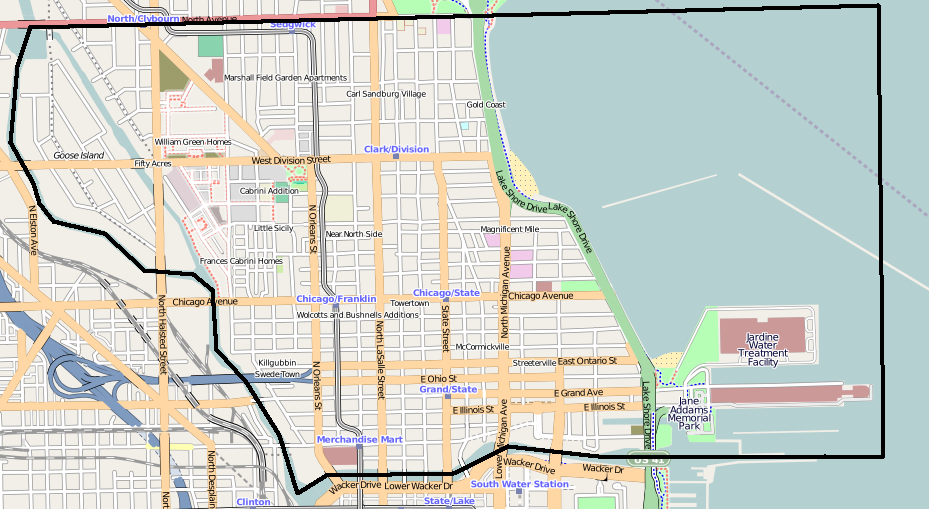
- Streetmap

- Location within the city of Chicago
- Coordinates: 41°54′2″N 87°37′58″W
- Country: United States
- State: Illinois
- County: Cook
- City: Chicago
- Neighborhoods: List: Goose Island; Old Town; Gold Coast; Cabrini–Green; Near North Side; Magnificent Mile; River North; Streeterville; Dearborn Parkway; State Parkway

Area
  - Total: 2.72 sq mi (7.04 km^{2})
- Elevation: 587 ft (179 m)

Population (2024)
  - Total: 107,331
  - Density: 39,500/sq mi (15,200/km^{2})

Demographics (2024)
  - White: 64.3%
  - Black: 7.9%
  - Hispanic: 8.3%
  - Asian: 14.9%
  - Other: 4.6%
- Time zone: UTC-6 (CST)
  - Summer (DST): UTC-5 (CDT)
- ZIP codes: 60611, most of 60610, and parts of 60654 and 60642
- Median household income (2024): $124,208
- Source: U.S. Census, Record Information Services

The Near North Side is one of the 77 community areas of Chicago in Illinois, United States. It is the northernmost of the three areas that constitute central Chicago, the others being the Loop and the Near South Side. The community area is located north and east of the Chicago River. To its east is the shore of Lake Michigan, and its northern boundary is the early 19th-century city limit of Chicago, North Avenue. In 2020 the Near North Side had 105,481 residents, surpassing Lake View as the largest Chicago community area by population. It is also the most densely populated community area and has the second most skyscrapers, after the Loop. With the exception of areas near Goose Island in the northwest (which is undergoing development), the Near North Side is known for its affluence, typified by the Gold Coast, Magnificent Mile, Navy Pier, and residential skyscrapers.

The Near North Side is arguably the oldest part of Chicago. In the 1780s, in what is now the Near North Side, on the northern banks of the Chicago River near today's Michigan Avenue Bridge, Jean Baptiste Point du Sable built the first known permanent settlement in what was called "Eschecagou." Today, this is marked by Pioneer Court.

Especially in the vicinity of Rush and Erie streets, the Near North Side was once known as McCormickville; so named because it is here where many branches of the famous McCormick family of mechanical reaper and publishing fame built their mansions in the late 1800s and early 1900s.

== Neighborhoods ==
Historical population
Census	Pop.	Note	%±
1910	97,230		—
1920	83,936		−13.7%
1930	79,554		−5.2%
1940	76,954		−3.3%
1950	89,196		15.9%
1960	75,509		−15.3%
1970	70,329		−6.9%
1980	67,167		−4.5%
1990	62,842		−6.4%
2000	72,903		16.0%
2010	80,484		10.4%
2020	105,481		31.1%
2024 (est.)	107,331		1.8%

=== Gold Coast ===
The Gold Coast consists mostly of luxury high-rise apartment towers and buildings and stone mansions throughout. Its borders are generally defined as North Avenue to the north, Lake Michigan to the east, Chicago Avenue to the south, and Clark Street to the west.

The Gold Coast became the home of the super-rich in 1885, when Potter Palmer, former dry goods merchant and owner of the Palmer House hotel, built a fanciful castle on Lake Shore Drive. Over the next few decades, Chicago's elite gradually migrated from Prairie Avenue to their new homes north of the Loop.

Along almost every boulevard of the Gold Coast has upscale boutiques and shops. Many upscale auto dearlerships are located here. Many of Chicago's best known and highly rated restaurants are located here as well. Also in the area are Lou Malnati's Pizzeria, Gibsons Steakhouse, and the original Morton's The Steakhouse.

The "Gold Coast Historic District" was listed on the National Register of Historic Places on January 30, 1978.

The Gold Coast is zoned to the following Chicago Public Schools schools: Ogden School and the prestigious Latin School of Chicago.

=== Old Town ===
Old Town is a Chicago neighborhood bounded by North Avenue on the north, Larrabee Street on the northwest, Division Street on the south, Clybourn Avenue on the southwest, and LaSalle Street on the east. It crosses portions of the community areas of southern Lincoln Park, as well as the northern Near North Side, and is part of Chicago's 43rd ward. Old Town includes the Old Town Triangle Historic District which is bounded on its northwest side by the former Ogden Avenue right-of-way, its northeast side by Lincoln Avenue and Wells Street, and on its south side by North Avenue. This historic district sits within the Old Town Triangle Association (OTTA), a Lincoln Park neighborhood bounded by the former Ogden Avenue right-of-way, Clark Street, and North Avenue. It sits inside the community area of Lincoln Park and is part of Chicago's 43rd ward. Old Town north of North Avenue is in Lincoln Park, and south of North Avenue is part of the Near North Side.

Old Town is now an affluent and historic neighborhood, home to many of Chicago's older Victorian-era buildings. However, in the 1950s, most of this area was an enclave to the first emigrants from Puerto Rico to Chicago, who referred to it as part of La Clark until commercialization decorated late 1960s shop signs with the name of Old Town. The neighborhood is home to St. Michael's Church, originally built to serve German immigrants, and one of only 7 to survive the great Chicago fire. St. Michael's, Holy Name Cathedral, Immaculate Conception, and St. Joseph's Catholic churches all catered to Latinos with a Mass in Spanish.

Many of the streets and alleys, particularly in the Old Town Triangle section, predate the Great Chicago Fire and do not all adhere to the city's typical grid pattern. In 1927, sculptors Sol Kogen and Edgar Miller purchased and subsequently rehabilitated a house on Burton Place, near Wells Street, into the Carl Street Studios. Through the 1930s, an art colony emerged in the neighborhood as artists moved from the Towertown neighborhood near Washington Square Park.

Old Town was home to many gays and lesbians from the 1950s through the 1980s. This was the first "gay ghetto" in Chicago, predating the current large Lake View neighborhood which also contains the Boystown district. There were numerous gay establishments in Old Town (now mostly closed as Lake View is now the main gayborhood) along Wells Street and Old Town was home to the longstanding gay-themed Bijou Theater until it closed in September 2015. As Old Town gentrified, the LGBT population of the nearby Lake View neighborhood continued to increase, as well as the LGBT populations of the Lincoln Park and Andersonville areas.

Old Town is home to the famous Second City improvisational comedy troupe which has launched the careers of many successful comedians and actors.

Old Town has three "L" rapid transit stations: North/Clybourn, Sedgwick, and Clark/Division.

=== Goose Island ===
Goose Island is an island in Chicago covering 160 acres on the Chicago River that is completely surrounded by the rest of the city. It is separated from the mainland by the North Branch of the Chicago River on the west and by the North Branch Canal on the east. The canal was dug in 1853 by mayor William Butler Ogden's administration and was dug for industrial purposes, thus forming the island. After Irish immigrants settled on the island, it took the name Goose Island, as well as that of Kilgubbin, which was the immigrants' original home in Ireland. The Goose Island Brewery makes Kilgubbin Red Ale, in honor of this name.

The large facility on the north end of Goose Island (visible from North Avenue, but by car only reachable from the south: Division Street to North Branch to 1132 W. Blackhawk) is the Wrigley Global Innovation Center, a 193,000-square-foot (17,900 m^{2}) facility, which opened in September 2005 and was designed by Gyo Obata of Hellmuth, Obata and Kassabaum. While cars are able to approach from the south, trains, bicycles, and pedestrians can reach the site via the rail/pedestrian Cherry Avenue Bridge spanning from North Avenue to Goose Island. Additionally, there is seasonal access from the north via the Chicago Water Taxi service dock at the south end of the Cherry Avenue Bridge.

On the south end of the island is Kendall College's Riverworks campus. The southern end of the island is currently undergoing redevelopment with upscale condominiums, townhouses, and apartments.

=== River North ===
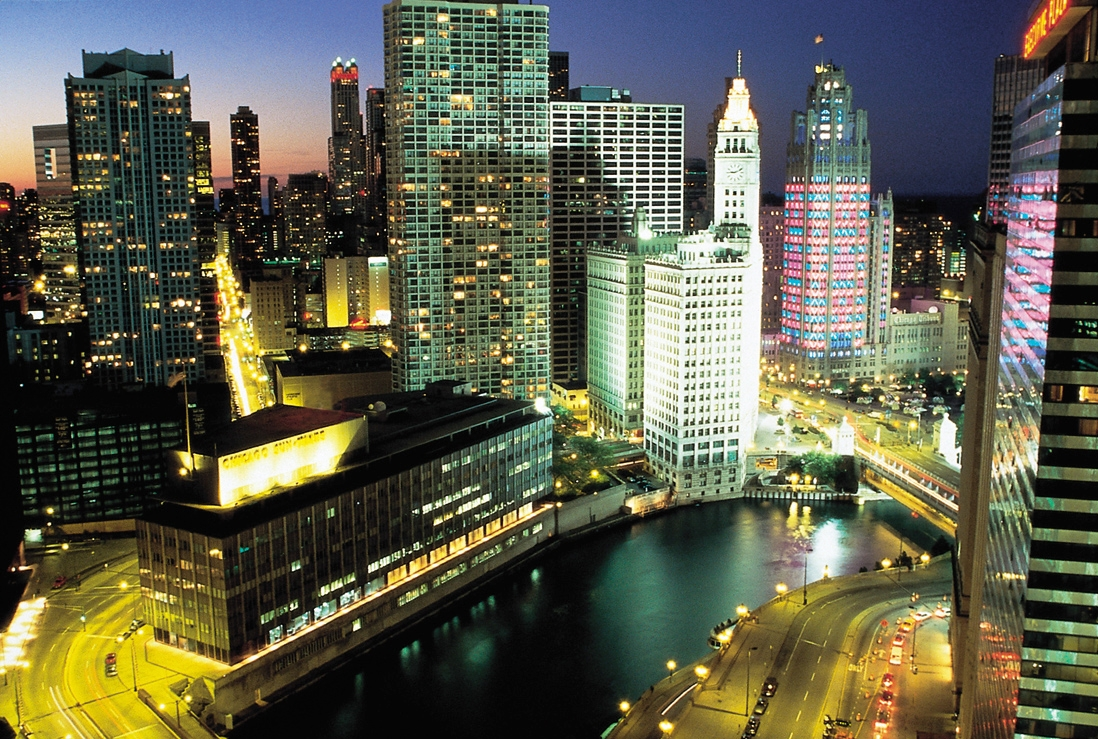
The former Chicago Sun-Times Building (site of current Trump International Hotel and Tower), Wrigley Building and Tribune Tower

River North is a neighborhood known for its fine dining, galleries, nightlife, and riverwalk amenities. It is home to the world headquarters of ConAgra, Groupon, Motorola Mobility, and the regional offices of Yelp. It is bounded by Michigan Avenue to the east, Chicago Avenue to the north, and the Chicago River to the south and west. River North has many towers and high-rises and some of its other famous structures include the Merchandise Mart, the Wrigley Building, Holy Name Cathedral, the Marina City towers, and the House of Blues.

==== Smokey Hollow ====
River North was previously named Smokey Hollow, at the turn of the 20th century, due to the many factories and forges in the area. Smoke from the factories was often so thick that it blocked the sunlight. At the time, Smokey Hollow was a major transportation hub, with railroad tracks linking the ports along the Chicago River to the surrounding areas. The now mixed-use Merchandise Mart was once a major storage warehouse for goods, and it still has railroad tracks underneath its sprawling structure. Former major retailer Montgomery Ward also had a major transportation and storage facility in River North. Massive coal bins were formerly located throughout the neighborhood, for storage of coal transported by ship.

==== Little Sicily ====
Little Sicily in Chicago was also located in River North. The first Italian Roman Catholic Church in Chicago was Assumption, on Illinois Street, with a mandate to be the parish church for all Italians from Lake Michigan to the Mississippi River. Later, Sicilians began to move north from the immediate vicinity of Assumption and began to form their own parishes. Italians whose family roots were from other parts of Italy tended to move west along Grand Street and form parishes west of Assumption.

===== Cabrini–Green =====
The Near North Side formerly included the now demolished Cabrini–Green Homes public housing project that once housed 15,000 subsidized tenants. It was made up primarily of high-rise and mid-rise buildings. The apartment buildings opened in 1958 and 1962, while the shuttered rowhouses (called the Frances Cabrini Homes, a few of which still exist) had opened in 1942. Cabrini–Green stood in what once was the former Italian enclave called the Little Sicily neighborhood, and the former site of St. Dominic's Church. In the 1920s, Little Sicily developed a reputation for poverty and crime. As gentrification began to take hold in the 1990s, the buildings made way for new upscale developments. The final Cabrini-Green tower was demolished in 2011. Following the conclusion of a civil lawsuit, the former Cabrini-Green site was transformed and revitalized with new upscale development spurred by the growth of Old Town to the north, and the already affluent areas of the Gold Coast to the east and River North to the south. Goose Island, which sits to the west, is currently undergoing new development.

==== River North ====
The River North neighborhood got its name from Chicago real estate developer Albert Friedman (chief executive of Friedman Properties Ltd.), who in 1974 started to buy, restore, and build commercial property in the southeast sector. Much of the area was a shabby urban neighborhood. In an effort to attract tenants Friedman began calling the area "River North". Within a few years, Friedman found photographers, ad agencies, and art galleries willing to rent the low-cost space and to coalesce into what is now the River North Gallery District, which has the largest concentration of art galleries in the United States outside of Manhattan. Along with hundreds of art galleries, the area has many taverns, rooftop bars, dance clubs, popular restaurants, and entertainment venues. Between the years 2000 and 2010, the population in the four census tracts covering River North increased by an average of nearly 82%, boosting population from 9,835 in 2000 to 17,892 in 2010.

Districts of River North include:

- the gallery district, primarily along Superior and Huron streets between Wells and Orleans;
- a theme-restaurant area with many tourist-oriented restaurants, surrounding Clark and Ontario;
- the cathedral district, an area with many new skyscrapers surrounding Holy Name Cathedral (Catholic) and St. James Cathedral (Episcopal), which are located near State and Superior, and Huron and Wabash, respectively. The Moody Bible Institute is not located too far away at Chicago Avenue and LaSalle Drive;
- a design district, with shops and showrooms selling commercial and luxury interior furnishings, in the blocks north of the Merchandise Mart;
- and Kingsbury Park, an area of newly built residential high-rises surrounding Montgomery Ward Park, at Erie Street and the Chicago River.

River North is serviced by four CTA "L" train stations: the subway stations of Chicago Avenue (Red Line) and Grand Avenue (Red Line); and the elevated stations of Chicago Avenue (Brown Line) and Merchandise Mart (Brown Line).

=== Streeterville ===
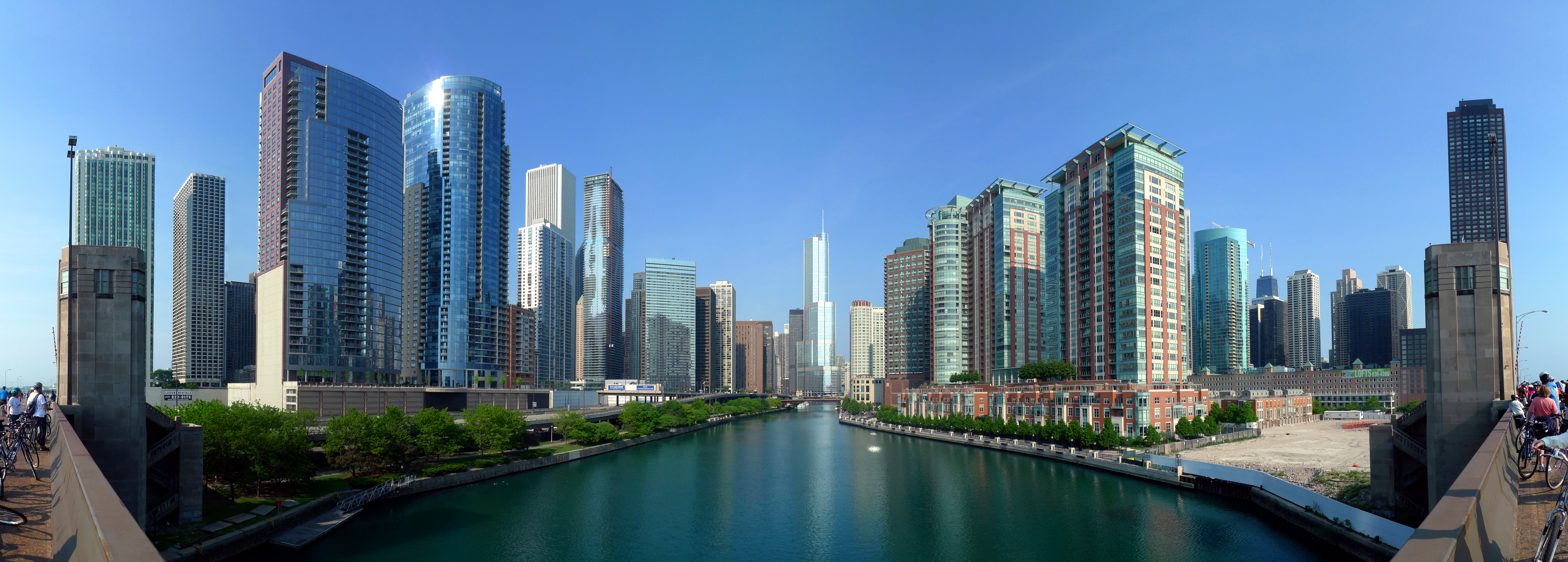
Chicago River is the south border (right) of the Near North Side and Streeterville and the north border (left) of Chicago Loop, Lakeshore East and Illinois Center (from Lake Shore Drive's Link Bridge with Trump International Hotel and Tower at jog in the river in the center)

Streeterville is the easternmost neighborhood in Chicago north of the Chicago River. It is bounded by the river on the south, Michigan Avenue on the west, and Lake Michigan on the north and east.

Streeterville houses some of Chicago's tallest skyscrapers (such as the John Hancock Center); many upscale stores, hotels, restaurants; and Northwestern University's Northwestern Memorial Hospital, Feinberg School of Medicine, School of Professional Studies, Kellogg School of Management's downtown campus, and School of Law.

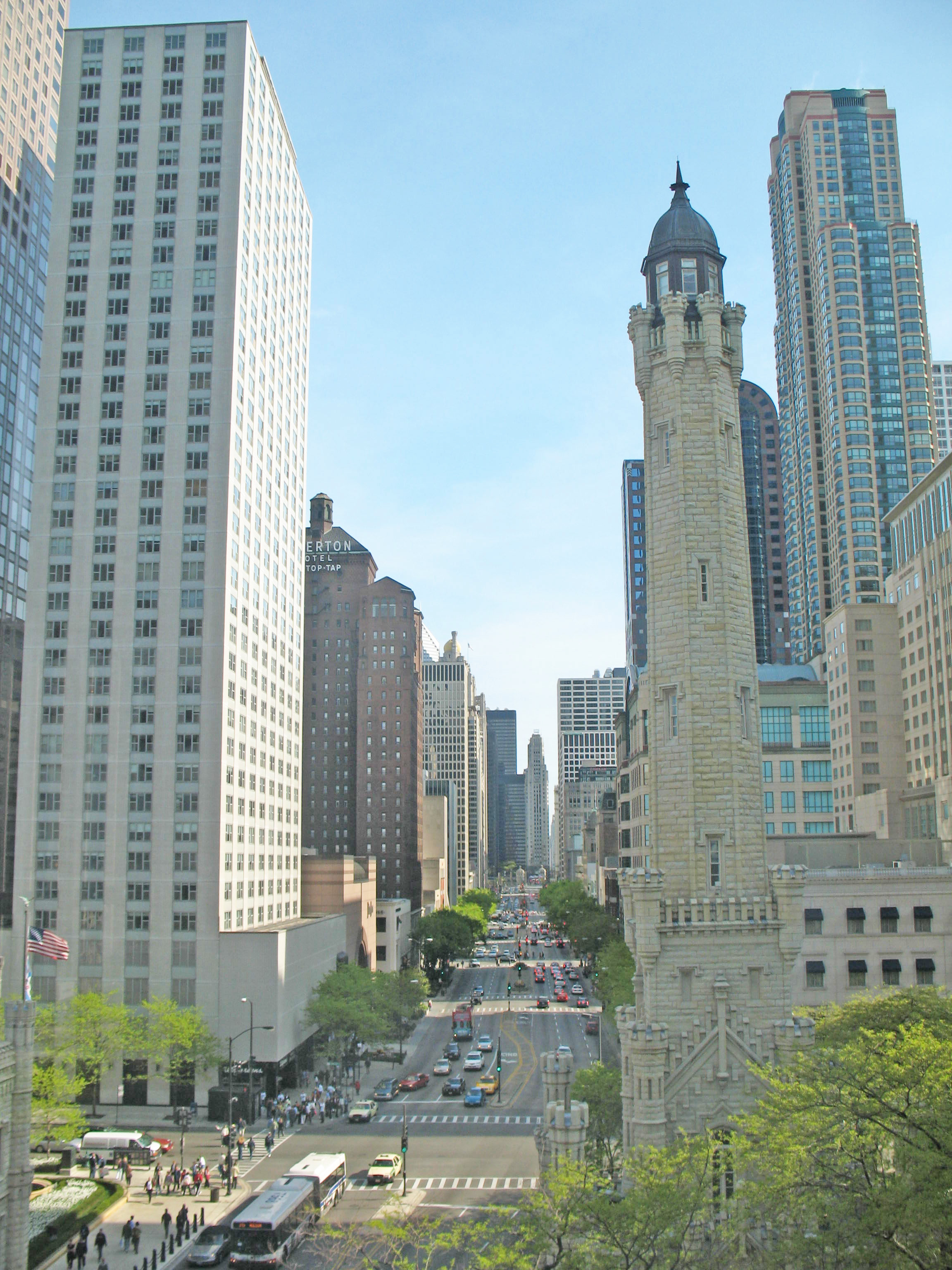
Magnificent Mile

The number one tourist attraction in the Midwest, Navy Pier, is located in Streeterville. The neighborhood also houses the Museum of Contemporary Art, Chicago.

==== Magnificent Mile ====
The Magnificent Mile is a stretch of North Michigan Avenue between the Chicago River and Oak Street. Along this portion of Michigan Avenue is a mixture of luxury stores, restaurants, office buildings, and hotels. The area has a high concentration of the city's major media firms and advertising agencies as well, including the Chicago Tribune newspaper.

The street is the home of Chicago's famous Water Tower landmark, Water Tower Park with its historic clock, and the eight-level Water Tower Place shopping center which grew up next door to the landmark. North of the shopping center can be found the famous John Hancock Center, also known as 875 North Michigan Avenue tower; the Art Deco Palmolive Building; and the lavish Drake Hotel that sits across from a beach.

== Notable attractions ==
Architecture/buildings

- Chicago Water Tower
- John Hancock Center
- Water Tower Place
- 860–880 Lake Shore Drive Apartments
- 900-910 North Lake Shore
- 900 North Michigan
- Marina City

- Holy Name Cathedral
- St. James Cathedral
- Wrigley Building
- Tribune Tower
- Trump Tower
- Lake Point Tower

Museums

- Chicago Children's Museum
- Driehaus Museum
- International Museum of Surgical Science
- Loyola University Museum of Art
- Museum of Contemporary Art, Chicago

Sights/Shopping

- Magnificent Mile
- Navy Pier
- Centennial Fountain

Theatre

- Chicago Shakespeare Theater
- IO Theater
- Lookingglass Theatre Company
- The Second City

== Economy ==
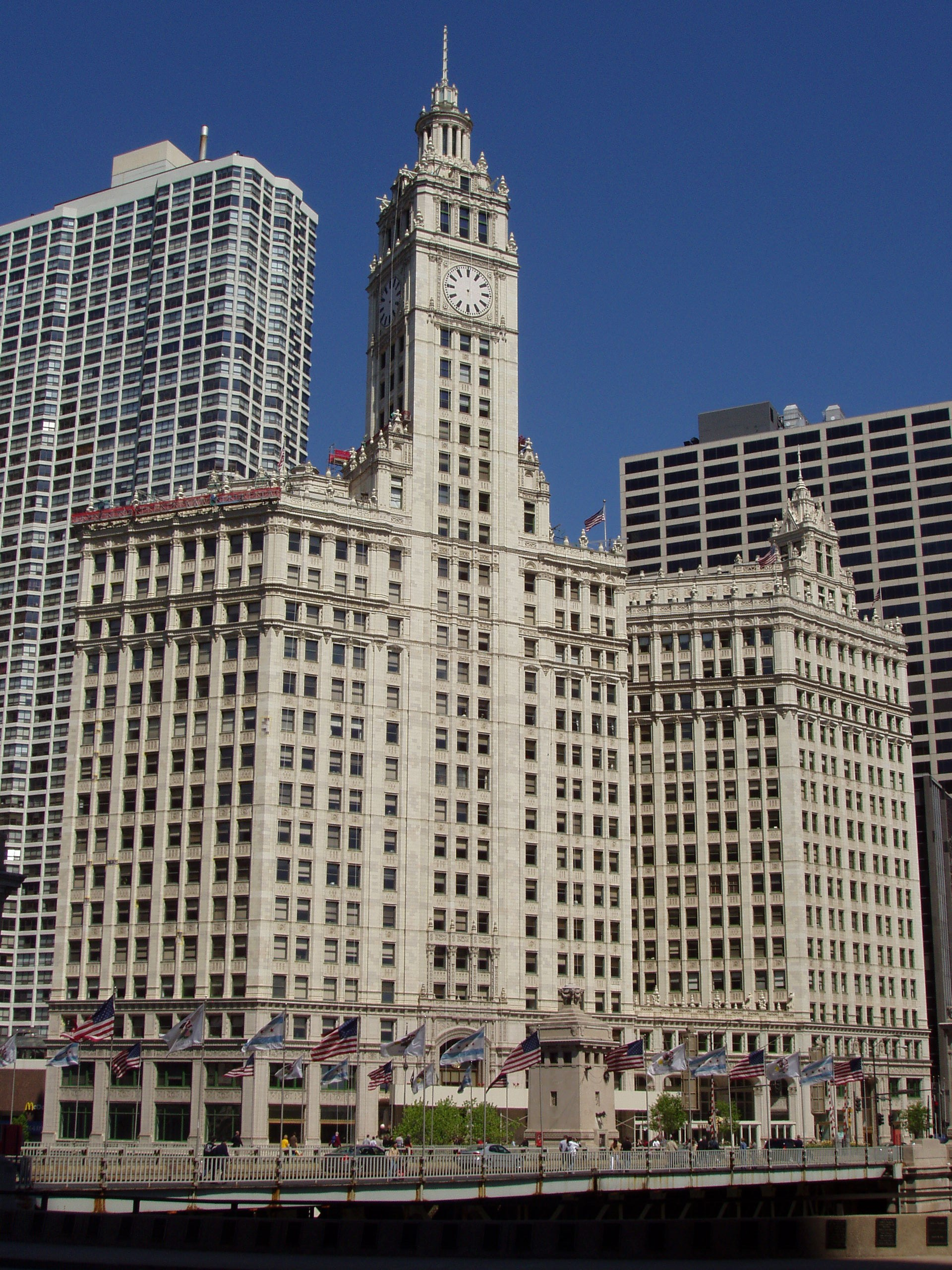
Wrigley Building, the former headquarters of the Wrigley Company

Google's Chicago offices are in the Dearborn Plaza building. Etihad Airways and Qatar Airways have offices in the John Hancock Center. The Wrigley Company had its headquarters in the Wrigley Building before moving to Goose Island, also within the community area, in 2012.

After American Airlines acquired Simmons Airlines, and before Simmons was dissolved, Simmons had its headquarters on the Near North Side. At one point Indigo Airlines was headquartered on the Near North Side. The Tribune Company had its headquarters in the eponymous Tribune Tower before moving to One Prudential Plaza in the Loop in 2017. Potbelly Sandwich Works likewise was located in the Merchandise Mart complex before moving to the West Loop in 2015.

== Politics ==
=== Local ===
The Near North Side is currently part of the 2nd, 27th, 42nd, and 43rd wards of the Chicago City Council, which are respectively represented by Democratic aldermen Brian Hopkins, Walter Burnett Jr., Brendan Reilly, and Michele Smith.

Aldermen who represented Near North Side from 1837 to 1863
Years	5th Ward		6th Ward		7th Ward		8th Ward		9th Ward	
1837–1838	Francis C. Taylor, Democratic	Vacant	Samuel Jackson, Democratic	Bernard Ward, Democratic	No such ward		No such ward		No such ward	
1838–1839	Henry L. Rucker	Vacant	George W. Dole, Whig	Grant Goodrich, Whig	No such ward		No such ward		No such ward	
1839–1840	Henry L. Rucker	John C. Wilson	John H. Kinzie, Whig	Buckner Stith Morris, Whig	No such ward		No such ward		No such ward	
1840–1841	Henry L. Rucker	William Allen	R.J. Hamilton	William B. Ogden, Democratic	No such ward		No such ward		No such ward	
1841–1842	Henry L. Rucker	Samuel Grier	George F. Foster	James J.H. Howe	No such ward		No such ward		No such ward	
1842–1843	George Brady	Edward Carroll	George W. Dole, Whig	George O. Bryan	No such ward		No such ward		No such ward	
1843–1844	Samuel Grier	Vacant	George W. Dole, Whig	J. Marback	No such ward		No such ward		No such ward	
1844	Thomas Brown	Elihu Granger	Michael Diversey	Buckner Stith Morris, Whig	No such ward		No such ward		No such ward	
1844–1845	Thomas Brown	Patrick Kain	Michael Diversey	James H. Rees	No such ward		No such ward		No such ward	
1845–1846	Elihu Granger	Samuel Grier	Richard C. Ross	Mahlon D. Ogden	No such ward		No such ward		No such ward	
1846–1847	Elihu Granger	Samuel Grier	Richard C. Ross	William M. Larrabee	No such ward		No such ward		No such ward	
1847–1848	Not in ward		Not in ward		Charles Sloan	Elihu Granger	James Lane	William B. Snowhook	Michael McDonald	William B. Ogden, Democratic
1848–1849	Not in ward		Not in ward		Charles Sloan	Peter Turbot	James Lane	William B. Herrick	Michael McDonald	Samuel McKay
1849	Not in ward		Not in ward		George Brady	Peter Turbot	Henry R. Payson	William B. Herrick	F.C. Hageman	Samuel McKay
1849–1850	Not in ward		Not in ward		George Brady	Peter Turbot	Henry R. Payson	William B. Herrick	F.C. Hageman	R.J. Hamilton
1850–1851	Not in ward		Not in ward		George Brady	Elihu Granger	John C. Dodge	George F. Foster	F.C. Hageman	R.J. Hamilton
1851–1852	Not in ward		Not in ward		Charles E. Moore	Elihu Granger	John C. Dodge	Robert Malcolm	F.C. Hageman	Walter L. Newberry
1852	Not in ward		Not in ward		Charles E. Moore	Ezra Taylor	Andrew J. Brown	Robert Malcolm	John H. Kinzie, Whig	Walter L. Newberry
1852–1853	Not in ward		Not in ward		Charles E. Moore	Ezra Taylor	Andrew J. Brown	Robert Malcolm	John H. Kinzie, Whig	Henry A. Mitchell
1853	Not in ward		Not in ward		Michael O'Neil	Ezra Taylor	Andrew J. Brown	Francis A. Hoffman	John H. Kinzie, Whig	Henry A. Mitchell
1853–1854	Not in ward		Not in ward		Michael O'Neil	Maurice Evans	Andrew J. Brown	Francis A. Hoffman	John H. Kinzie, Whig	Henry A. Mitchell
1854	Not in ward		Not in ward		Michael O'Neil	Elihu Granger	William H. Stickney	Francis A. Hoffman	Morgan L. Keith	Henry A. Mitchell
1854–1855	Not in ward		Not in ward		Michael O'Neil	Elihu Granger	William H. Stickney	B.W. Thomas	Morgan L. Keith	Henry A. Mitchell
1855–1856	Not in ward		Not in ward		James J.H. Howe	Elihu Granger	Stephen D. LaRue	Samuel Ashton	Morgan L. Keith	Vacant
1856–1857	Not in ward		Not in ward		James J.H. Howe	John Dempsey	Stephen D. LaRue	Conrad L. Niehoff	Michael Diversey	Vacant
1857–1858	Not in ward		Not in ward		John Dunlap	Vacant	Stephen D. LaRue	Christian Wahl	Michael Diversey	Philip Conley
1858–1859	Not in ward		Not in ward		John Dunlap	Henry Wendt	Andrew Wright	Christian Wahl	Benjamin Carpenter	Philip Conley
1859–1860	Not in ward		Not in ward		John Alston	Henry Wendt	Andrew Wright	Christian Wahl	Benjamin Carpenter	J.A. Huck
1860–1861	Not in ward		Not in ward		John Alston	Gurdon Saltonstall Hubbard	Redmond Prindiville	Christian Wahl	Gurden Perkins	J.A. Huck
1861–1862	Not in ward		Not in ward		Alonzo Harvey	Gurdon Saltonstall Hubbard	Redmond Prindiville	W.G. White	Gurden Perkins	Robert Law
1862–1863	Not in ward		Not in ward		Alonzo Harvey	James Conlan	Charles L. Woodman	W.G. White	William T. Shufeldt	Robert Law

Aldermen who represented Near North Side from 1863 to 1869
Years	14th Ward		15th Ward		16th Ward		17th Ward	18th Ward	19th Ward	20th Ward
1863–1864	Valentine Ruh	Anton Hottinger	Michael Sullivan	James Conlan	Charles L. Woodman	William T. Shufeldt	No such ward	No such ward	No such ward	No such ward
1864–1865	Valentine Ruh	Anton Hottinger	Michael Sullivan	Iver Lawson	Charles L. Woodman	James J. O'Sullivan	No such ward	No such ward	No such ward	No such ward
1865–1866	Valentine Ruh	Anton Hottinger	Samuel Shackford	Iver Lawson	Charles L. Woodman	Robert Clark	No such ward	No such ward	No such ward	No such ward
1866–1867	Valentine Ruh	Robert Engel	Samuel Shackford	Iver Lawson	Michael O'Sullivan	Robert Clark	No such ward	No such ward	No such ward	No such ward
1867–1868	Theodore Schintz	Vacant	Samuel Shackford	Iver Lawson	Michael O'Sullivan	George B. Mansur	No such ward	No such ward	No such ward	No such ward
1868–1869	Theodore Schintz	Louis A. Berger	Samuel Shackford	John Herting	Edward Kehoe	George B. Mansur	No such ward	No such ward	No such ward	No such ward

Aldermen who represented Near North Side from 1888 to 1893
Years	20th Ward		21st Ward	22nd Ward		23rd Ward		24th Ward	
1888–1889	Otto Hage	George K. Rix	Not in ward	Thomas D. Burke	Charles Burmeister	John H. McCormick	Daniel R. O'Brien	Jacob H. Tiedemann	William R. Manierre
1889–1890	Otto Hage	Daniel Long	Not in ward	Thomas D. Burke	Edward Muelhoefer	John H. McCormick	Daniel R. O'Brien	Jacob H. Tiedemann	James S. Dunham
1890–1891	William Eisfeldt Jr.	Daniel Long	Not in ward	Julius Goldzier	Edward Muelhoefer	John H. McCormick	Daniel R. O'Brien	James B. McAbee	James S. Dunham
1891–1892	William Eisfeldt Jr.	William C. Pfister	Not in ward	Julius Goldzier	Edward Muelhoefer	John H. McCormick	Daniel R. O'Brien	James B. McAbee	Peter J. Biegler
1892–1893	Albert Potthoff	William C. Pfister	Not in ward	Arnold Tripp	Edward Muelhoefer			Zara C. Peck	Peter J. Biegler

Aldermen who have represented Near North Side since 1923
Period	42nd Ward	43rd Ward	27th Ward	2nd Ward	32nd Ward
1923–1927	Dorsey Crowe, Democratic	Arthur F. Albert, Republican	Not in ward	Not in ward	Not in ward
1927–1929	Dorsey Crowe, Democratic	Titus A. Haffa, Republican	Not in ward	Not in ward	Not in ward
1929–1931	Dorsey Crowe, Democratic	Arthur F. Albert, Republican	Not in ward	Not in ward	Not in ward
1931–1933	Dorsey Crowe, Democratic	James B. Waller, Republican	Not in ward	Not in ward	Not in ward
1933–1943	Dorsey Crowe, Democratic	Paddy Bauler, Democratic	Not in ward	Not in ward	Not in ward
1943–1947	Dorsey Crowe, Democratic	James B. Waller, Republican	Not in ward	Not in ward	Not in ward
1947–1962	Dorsey Crowe, Democratic	Paddy Bauler, Democratic	Not in ward	Not in ward	Not in ward
1962–1963	Vacant	Paddy Bauler, Democratic	Not in ward	Not in ward	Not in ward
1963–1967	Mayer Goldberg, Democratic	Paddy Bauler, Democratic	Not in ward	Not in ward	Not in ward
1967–1968	Mayer Goldberg, Democratic	George McCutcheon, Republican	Not in ward	Not in ward	Not in ward
1968–1969	Vacant	George McCutcheon, Republican	Not in ward	Not in ward	Not in ward
1969–1970	Raymond K. Fried, Democratic	George McCutcheon, Republican	Not in ward	Not in ward	Not in ward
1970–1971	Vacant	George McCutcheon, Republican	Not in ward	Not in ward	Not in ward
1971–1975	Burton Natarus, Democratic	William Singer, Democratic	Not in ward	Not in ward	Not in ward
1975–1987	Burton Natarus, Democratic	Martin J. Oberman, Democratic	Not in ward	Not in ward	Not in ward
1987–1992	Burton Natarus, Democratic	Edwin Eisendrath, Democratic	Not in ward	Not in ward	Not in ward
1992–1993	Burton Natarus, Democratic	Edwin Eisendrath, Democratic	Rickey R. Hendon, Democratic	Not in ward	Terry Gabinski, Democratic
1993–1995	Burton Natarus, Democratic	Charles Bernardini, Democratic	Rickey R. Hendon, Democratic	Not in ward	Terry Gabinski, Democratic
1995–1998	Burton Natarus, Democratic	Charles Bernardini, Democratic	Walter Burnett Jr., Democratic	Not in ward	Terry Gabinski, Democratic
1998–1999	Burton Natarus, Democratic	Charles Bernardini, Democratic	Walter Burnett Jr., Democratic	Not in ward	Theodore Matlak, Democratic
1999–2007	Burton Natarus, Democratic	Vi Daley, Democratic	Walter Burnett Jr., Democratic	Not in ward	Theodore Matlak, Democratic
2007–2011	Brendan Reilly, Democratic	Vi Daley, Democratic	Walter Burnett Jr., Democratic	Not in ward	Scott Waguespack, Democratic
2011–2015	Brendan Reilly, Democratic	Michele Smith, Democratic	Walter Burnett Jr., Democratic	Not in ward	Scott Waguespack, Democratic
2015–present	Brendan Reilly, Democratic	Michele Smith, Democratic	Walter Burnett Jr., Democratic	Brian Hopkins, Democratic	Not in ward

In the Cook County Board of Commissioners the majority of the area is in the 3rd district, represented by Democrat Bill Lowry. The westernmost part, including the majority of Goose Island, and much of the southwestern part, including the majority of River North, is in the 12th District, represented by Democrat John Fritchey. Two parts of the area in the extreme south—the respective vicinities of Wolf Point and the Wabash Avenue Bridge—are part of the 2nd District, represented by Democrat Dennis Deer.

=== State ===
In the Illinois House of Representatives the community area is roughly evenly split lengthwise between, from east to west, Districts 26, 5, 9, and 10, represented respectively by Democrats Christian Mitchell, Juliana Stratton, Art Turner, and Melissa Conyears. The southwest portion of the area—the western half of River North—is within District 6 represented by Democrat Sonya Harper, and the northeastern part—the eastern half of Old Town and the northern half of the Gold Coast—is within District 12, represented by Democrat Sara Feigenholtz.

Illinois State Representatives who have represented Near North Side since 2001
Years	District 5	District 6	District 9	District 10	District 12	District 26
2001–2002	Lovana Jones, Democratic	Not in district	Arthur Turner, Democratic	Annazette Collins, Democratic	Sara Feigenholtz, Democratic	Charles G. Morrow III, Democratic
2002–2003	Kenneth Dunkin, Democratic	Not in district	Arthur Turner, Democratic	Annazette Collins, Democratic	Sara Feigenholtz, Democratic	Charles G. Morrow III, Democratic
2003–2006	Kenneth Dunkin, Democratic	Not in district	Arthur Turner, Democratic	Annazette Collins, Democratic	Sara Feigenholtz, Democratic	Lovana Jones, Democratic
2006–2009	Kenneth Dunkin, Democratic	Not in district	Arthur Turner, Democratic	Annazette Collins, Democratic	Sara Feigenholtz, Democratic	Elga L. Jefferies, Democratic
2009–2010	Kenneth Dunkin, Democratic	Not in district	Arthur Turner, Democratic	Annazette Collins, Democratic	Sara Feigenholtz, Democratic	William D. Burns, Democratic
2010–2011	Kenneth Dunkin, Democratic	Not in district	Art Turner, Democratic	Annazette Collins, Democratic	Sara Feigenholtz, Democratic	William D. Burns, Democratic
2011–2012	Kenneth Dunkin, Democratic	Esther Golar, Democratic	Art Turner, Democratic	Derrick Smith, Democratic	Sara Feigenholtz, Democratic	Kimberly du Buclet, Democratic
2012–2013	Kenneth Dunkin, Democratic	Esther Golar, Democratic	Art Turner, Democratic	Eddie Winters, Democratic	Sara Feigenholtz, Democratic	Kimberly du Buclet, Democratic
2013–2014	Kenneth Dunkin, Democratic	Esther Golar, Democratic	Art Turner, Democratic	Derrick Smith, Democratic	Sara Feigenholtz, Democratic	Christian Mitchell, Democratic
2014–2015	Kenneth Dunkin, Democratic	Esther Golar, Democratic	Art Turner, Democratic	Vacant	Sara Feigenholtz, Democratic	Christian Mitchell, Democratic
2015–2017	Kenneth Dunkin, Democratic	Sonya Harper, Democratic	Art Turner, Democratic	Pamela Reaves-Harris, Democratic	Sara Feigenholtz, Democratic	Christian Mitchell, Democratic
2017–present	Juliana Stratton, Democratic	Sonya Harper, Democratic	Art Turner, Democratic	Melissa Conyears, Democratic	Sara Feigenholtz, Democratic	Christian Mitchell, Democratic

In the Illinois Senate the biggest portion of the community area is in District 3, represented by Democrat Mattie Hunter, while Streeterville and the southern half of the Gold Coast is in District 13, represented by Democrat Kwame Raoul, Cabrini–Green, Goose Island, and the western half of Old Town is in District 5, represented by Democrat Patricia Van Pelt, and the eastern part of Old Town and the northern half of the Gold Coast is in District 6, represented by Democrat and Illinois Senate President John Cullerton.

Illinois State Senators who have represented Near North Side since 2001
Years	District 3	District 5	District 6	District 13
2001–2003	Margaret Smith, Democratic	Rickey R. Hendon, Democratic	John Cullerton, Democratic	Barack Obama, Democratic
2003–2004	Mattie Hunter, Democratic	Rickey R. Hendon, Democratic	John Cullerton, Democratic	Barack Obama, Democratic
2004–2011	Mattie Hunter, Democratic	Rickey R. Hendon, Democratic	John Cullerton, Democratic	Kwame Raoul, Democratic
2011–2013	Mattie Hunter, Democratic	Annazette Collins, Democratic	John Cullerton, Democratic	Kwame Raoul, Democratic
2013–present	Mattie Hunter, Democratic	Patricia Van Pelt, Democratic	John Cullerton, Democratic	Kwame Raoul, Democratic

=== Federal ===
In the US House of Representatives, the area is mostly within Illinois's 7th congressional district, which is the most Democratic-leaning district in the State of Illinois according to the Cook Partisan Voting Index with a score of D+38 and represented by Democrat Danny K. Davis. Small parts in the north are within Illinois's 5th congressional district, which is represented by Democrat Mike Quigley.

In the 2016 presidential election, the Near North Side cast 32,150 votes for Hillary Clinton and cast 8,778 votes for Donald Trump (74.5% to 20.4%). In the 2012 presidential election, the Near North Side cast 24,592 votes for Barack Obama and cast 12,939 votes for Mitt Romney (64.5% to 34.0%).

== Diplomatic missions ==
Several consulates are located on the Near North Side. The main building and visa office of the Consulate-General of the People's Republic of China are here. Other countries with missions here include Austria, Bosnia and Herzegovina, Brazil, Bulgaria, Chile, Colombia, Denmark, Egypt, Germany, Greece, India, Ireland, Italy, Japan, South Korea, Lithuania, Poland, Serbia, Switzerland, Thailand, the United Kingdom, and Ukraine.

Three trade missions have offices at 500 North Michigan Avenue: the Austrian Trade Commission is located in Suite 1950, the Italian-American Chamber of Commerce Midwest is located in Suite 506, and the Trade Commission of Spain is here.

== Education ==
=== Colleges and universities ===
- The Chicago School of Professional Psychology
- Erikson Institute
- Loyola University Chicago
  - Loyola University Chicago School of Law
- Moody Bible Institute
- Northwestern University School of Law
- Northwestern University Medical School
- University of Chicago's Booth School of Business Gleacher Center

=== Primary and secondary schools ===
Chicago Public Schools serves residents of the Near North Side.

- Zoned elementary schools include Ogden International School (Jenner School has merged into Ogden)
- Some students are zoned to Wells Community Academy High School while others are zoned to Lincoln Park High School

Magnet schools:

- Walter Payton College Prep

Charter schools:

- Noble Academy

Private schools:

- Latin School of Chicago

=== Adult education ===
- Feltre School

=== Libraries ===
- Newberry Library
- Chicago Public Library Near North Branch
- Chicago Public Library Water Works Branch

== Notable residents ==
- Conor Allen, AHL player with the Rochester Americans. He was raised in Old Town.
- Henry A. Courtney Jr. (1916–1945), officer of the United States Marine Corps Reserve and a posthumous recipient of the Medal of Honor. He resided at 30 West Chicago Avenue while studying at Loyola University's School of Law.
- Mike Ditka (1939–2026), professional football player, coach, and television commentator. Lived on the Near North Side semi-regularly beginning in 2000.
- Mitch Glasser (born 1989), Israeli-American baseball player
- Nellie Grant (1855–1922), daughter of President Ulysses S. Grant. At the time of her death, she resided at 1130 North Lake Shore Drive with her husband Frank Hatch Jones.
- Dwight H. Green (1897–1958), 30th Governor of Illinois (1941–1949). He resided at 1360 North Lake Shore Drive at the time of his death.
- Robert Halperin (1908–1985), athlete and businessman who founded Lands' End. He resided on the Near North Side.
- James S. Kemper (1886–1981), insurance business executive and United States Ambassador to Brazil (1953–1955). He resided at 1500 North Lake Shore Drive at the time of his death.
- Suzanne Le Mignot, television news anchor and reporter.
- Walter Paepcke (1896–1960), businessman and founder of the Container Corporation of America. At the time of his death, he lived at the Drake Hotel.
- Polo G (born 1999), rapper.
- Anthony Scariano (1918–2004), judge of the Illinois Appellate Court. He was a childhood resident on the 1000 block of North Sedgewick Street.
- Gene Siskel (1946–1999), film critic. He resided at 1301 N. Astor St.
- Jesse White (born 1934), 37th Illinois Secretary of State (1999–2023). He was a childhood resident of at 536 and then 466 West Division Street.
