= Timmy Knudsen =

American politician

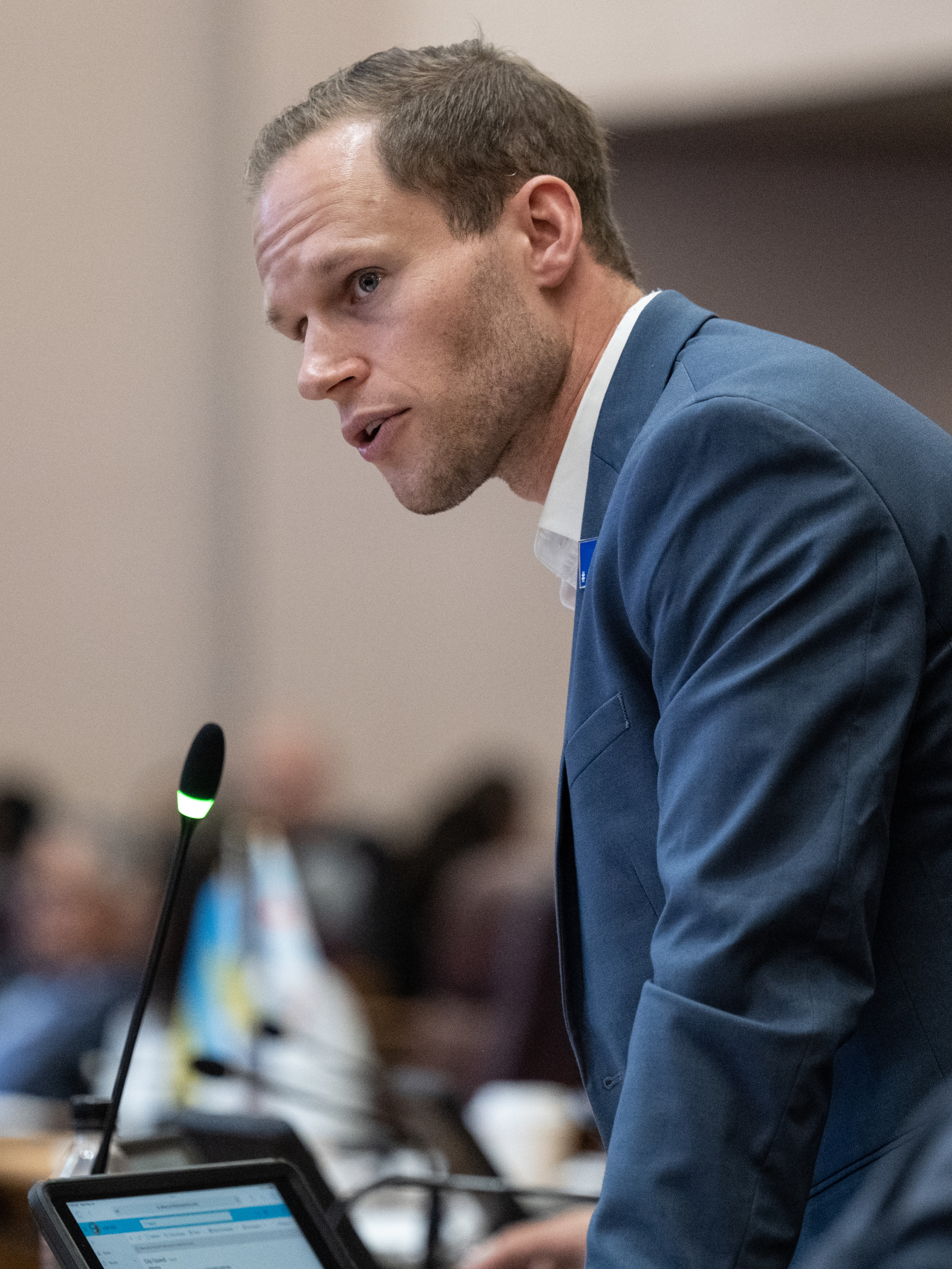

Member of the Chicago City Council from the 43rd ward
- Incumbent
- Assumed office September 21, 2022
- Preceded by: Michele Smith

Personal details
- Born: June 5, 1990 (age 36)
- Party: Democratic
- Education: University of Illinois, Urbana-Champaign (BA, JD)

Timmy Knudsen (born 1990) is an American politician, currently serving in the Chicago City Council as alderman for the 43rd ward. He was appointed to the position by Mayor Lori Lightfoot and confirmed by the City Council in September 2022, following the retirement of Michele Smith. The 43rd ward is on Chicago's North Side, including much of Lincoln Park and a small portion of the Near North Side.

== Early life and education ==
Knudsen graduated with a bachelor's degree from the University of Illinois Urbana-Champaign in 2012 and a Juris Doctor from the University of Illinois College of Law in 2015.

== Early legal and political career ==
Knudsen worked as an attorney for the firm Katten Muchin Rosenman, and later was a partner at the firm Croke, Fairchild, Morgan & Beres, where he worked on venture capital and start-up company issues.

In 2019, Knudsen was part of the campaign finance team for Lori Lightfoot in the 2019 Chicago mayoral election, which she ultimately won. In September 2019, Knudsen was appointed as an alternate member of the Chicago Zoning Board of Appeals. In September 2020, Lightfoot nominated him as chair of the board. He was confirmed by the Chicago City Council to the position the next month.

== Chicago City Council ==
Incumbent 43rd ward alderman Michele Smith announced her retirement in August 2022. Knudsen launched a campaign for 43rd ward alderman in the 2023 elections and applied to fill the remainder of Smith's term. On September 19, 2022, Lightfoot nominated him to fill the vacancy. The City Council confirmed his appointment on September 21, 2022.

Upon his appointment, Knudsen stated that public safety, public schools, and "giving back to the community" were his top priorities. He announced that one of his first initiatives would be to install new security cameras throughout the ward.

In 2023, he ran for election in the 43rd Ward, receiving a plurality of 26.8% in the municipal general election. He then ran in the runoff against Sheffield Neighbors Association president Brian Comer and defeated him with 52.9% of the vote

== Personal life ==
Knudsen lives in Lincoln Park, and his home renovation was featured on an episode of House Hunters. He is openly gay.

== See also ==
- List of Chicago alderpersons since 1923
