= 1986 Cook County Board of Commissioners election =

- November 4, 1986

All 17 seats on the Cook County Board of Commissioners 9 seats needed for a majority
	First party	Second party
Party	Democratic	Republican
Seats before	11	6
Seats won	10	7
Seat change	▼1	▲1
Popular vote	6,766,182	3,689,203
Percentage	64.71%	35.29%

The 1986 Cook County Board of Commissioners election saw all seventeen seats of the Cook County Board of Commissioners up for election to four-year terms in two sets of elections (ten elected from an election held in the city of Chicago and seven elected from and election held in suburban Cook County). The election was part of the 1986 Cook County, Illinois, elections.

Democrats lost a seat, and Republicans, conversely, gained a seat. As of 2026, this remains the most recent instance in which the Democratic Party won less than 11 seats, and the most recent instance in which Republican Party won more than 6 seats. It is also the most recent election in which Republicans increased their representation on the board, and the most recent in which Democrats decreased their representation.

== City of Chicago ==
Ten seats were elected from the City of Chicago.

=== Democratic primary ===
Cook County Board of Commissioners Chicago Democratic primary
Party	Candidate	Votes	%
Democratic	George W. Dunne (incumbent)	270,744	8.68
Democratic	Jerry "Iceman" Butler (incumbent)	215,292	6.90
Democratic	John H. Stroger, Jr. (incumbent)	196,824	6.31
Democratic	Samuel G. Vaughan (incumbent)	161,586	5.18
Democratic	Charles R. Bernardini	153.272	4.92
Democratic	Bobbie L. Steele	143,577	4.60
Democratic	Irene C. Hernandez (incumbent)	135,026	4.33
Democratic	Frank A. Damato	132,098	4.24
Democratic	Marco Domico	129,186	4.14
Democratic	Rose-Marie Love	127,975	4.10
Democratic	Lilia T. Delgado	122,794	3.94
Democratic	Michael L. Nardulli	116,850	3.75
Democratic	Edward H. Mazur	115,117	3.69
Democratic	Frank D. Stemberk	114,750	3.68
Democratic	Sidney L. "Sid" Ordower	109,529	3.51
Democratic	Stephen T. Hynes	98,506	3.16
Democratic	Michael Patrick Hogan	95,876	3.07
Democratic	Daniel P. O'Brien	86,849	2.79
Democratic	Mary Therese Dunne	79,066	2.54
Democratic	Chester T. Stanislawski	68,529	2.20
Democratic	Gregory J. Wojowski	59,943	1.92
Democratic	John T. McGuire	58,117	1.86
Democratic	William J. Donohue	54,288	1.74
Democratic	Charles R. Bowen	51.552	1.65
Democratic	Joseph McAfee	46,493	1.49
Democratic	James W. Flint	46,128	1.48
Democratic	Ginger E. Andrews	41,867	1.34
Democratic	Carmine Castrovillari	36,479	1.14
Democratic	Robert Mercurio	29,821	0.96
Democratic	John Fraire	21,341	0.68

=== Republican ===
Cook County Board of Commissioners Chicago Republican primary
Party	Candidate	Votes	%
Republican	Susan Catania	13,501	9.85
Republican	Richard D. Murphy	13,417	9.79
Republican	Brenda A. Sheriff	12,994	9.48
Republican	Julia Fairfax	12,923	9.43
Republican	Brian G. Doherty	12,839	9.36
Republican	William Allen E. Boyd	12,684	9.25
Republican	Stephan J. Evans	12,669	9.24
Republican	Charles J. Fogel	12,517	9.13
Republican	LaFaye L. Casey	12,133	8.85
Republican	Paul J. Taxey	10,967	8.00
Republican	William M. Cronin	10,464	7.63

=== General election ===
Cook County Board of Commissioners Chicago election
Party	Candidate	Votes	%
Democratic	George W. Dunne (incumbent)	569,517	8.60
Democratic	Charles R. Bernardini	528,928	7.99
Democratic	Jerry "Iceman" Butler (incumbent)	527,951	7.58
Democratic	John H. Stroger, Jr. (incumbent)	520,930	7.87
Democratic	Irene C. Hernandez (incumbent)	506,389	7.65
Democratic	Bobbie L. Steele	503,110	7.60
Democratic	Frank A. Damato	499,689	7.55
Democratic	Samuel G. Vaughan (incumbent)	596,454	7.50
Democratic	Marco Domico	485,772	7.34
Democratic	Rose-Marie Love	482,230	7.29
Republican	Susan Catania	205,219	3.10
Republican	Richard D. Murphy	158,041	2.39
Republican	Brian G. Doherty	156,207	2.36
Republican	Brenda A. Sheriff	146,631	2.22
Republican	Julia Fairfax	142,990	2.16
Republican	William Allen E. Boyd	141,712	2.14
Republican	LaFaye L. Casey	140,180	2.12
Republican	Charles J. Fogel	138,667	2.09
Republican	Stephan J. Evans	137,356	2.07
Republican	Paul J. Taxey	131,957	1.99

== Suburban Cook County ==
=== Democratic primary ===
Cook County Board of Commissioners suburban Cook County Democratic primary
Party	Candidate	Votes	%
Democratic	Joan P. Murphy	75,981	13.85
Democratic	Janice D. "Jan" Schakowsky	72,315	13.18
Democratic	Kevin J. Conlon	71,012	12.94
Democratic	John D. Rita	70,835	12.91
Democratic	Andrew "Andy" Przybylo	67,167	12.24
Democratic	Renee H. Thaler	67,072	12.22
Democratic	John J. Lattner	62,287	11.35
Democratic	Edward J. King	62,015	11.30

=== Republican primary ===
Cook County Board of Commissioners suburban Cook County Republican primary
Party	Candidate	Votes	%
Republican	Bernard Carey (incumbent)	54,525	13.21
Republican	Mary M. McDonald (incumbent)	47,117	11.43
Republican	Joseph I. Woods (incumbent)	43,912	10.64
Republican	Carl R. Hansen (incumbent)	42,499	10.30
Republican	Harold L. Tyrrell (incumbent)	41,272	10.00
Republican	Richard A. Siebel (incumbent)	39,733	9.63
Republican	Joseph D. Mathewson	38,207	9.26
Republican	Patricia J. Semrow	28,887	7.00
Republican	Gordon Scott Hirsch	27,229	6.60
Republican	Thomas E. Brennan	25,365	6.15
Republican	C. Robert McDonald	23,855	5.78

=== General election ===
Republican nominee Bernard Carey was replaced on the ballot by Robert P. Gooley, as Carey opted to instead run for Illinois Attorney General, replacing James T. Ryan as the Republican nominee for that election.

Cook County Board of Commissioners suburban Cook County election
Party	Candidate	Votes	%
Republican	Mary M. McDonald (incumbent)	339,214	9.08
Republican	Joseph D. Mathewson	336,097	9.00
Republican	Harold L. Tyrrell (incumbent)	317,481	8.50
Republican	Carl R. Hansen (incumbent)	314,145	8.41
Republican	Richard A. Siebel (incumbent)	310,800	8.32
Republican	Joseph I. Woods (incumbent)	303,068	8.11
Republican	Robert P. Gooley	269,438	7.21
Democratic	Joan P. Murphy	262,699	7.03
Democratic	Janice D. "Jan" Schakowsky	239,517	6.41
Democratic	John J. Lattner	229,352	6.14
Democratic	Kevin J. Conlon	216,394	5.79
Democratic	Andrew "Andy" Przybylo	209,503	5.61
Democratic	John D. Rita	198,403	5.31
Democratic	Renee H. Thaler	189,344	5.07

== Summarizing statistics ==
Contest summary
Party	Seats held before	Candidates nominated	Seats won
Democratic	11	17	10
Republican	6	17	7
Total	17	34	17

Fate of incumbents
Party	Total incumbents	Incumbents that sought reelection/retired	Incumbents that won/lost re-nomination in primaries	Incumbents that were renominated
Democratic	11	5 sought reelection 6 retired	5 won re-nomination 0 lost renomination	5 won reelection 0 lost reelection
Republican	6	5 sought reelection 1 retired	5 won re-nomination 0 lost renomination	4 won reelection 1 withdrew 0 lost reelection
Total	17	10 sought reelection 7 retired	10 won re-nomination 0 lost renomination	9 won reelection 1 withdrew 0 lost reelection

Composition of elected board (returning/newly elected members)
Party	Returning members	Newly elected members	Total members
Democratic	5	5	10
Republican	4	3	7
Total	9	8	17
