= Vi Daley =

American politician (born 1943)

Member of the Chicago City Council from the 43rd ward
- In office May 3, 1999 – May 16, 2011
- Preceded by: Charles Bernardini
- Succeeded by: Michele Smith

Personal details
- Born: February 19, 1943 (age 83)
- Party: Democratic
- Spouse: Vince Daley
- Children: 2 adult daughters

Vi Daley was an alderman in the Chicago City Council, representing Chicago's 43rd ward. The 43rd ward includes much of the Lincoln Park and a small portions of the Near North Side Community areas. Daley was elected to three four-year terms, and chose not to seek reelection when her last term ended in 2011.

Daley is unrelated to the Daley family prominent in Chicago politics.

== Background ==
Vi Daley was born on February 19, 1943, in Rockford, Illinois, where she grew up and attended business school. After college, she worked for American Airlines at O'Hare International Airport, and spent her time near Rush Street, where she met her husband, Vince Daley, a bartender. They married, and Vince began working in real estate. The Daleys had two daughters, who inspired Vi Daley to get involved in the community. She became a leader in the effort to create Cummings Playground, the popular playground across from the entrance of the Lincoln Park Zoo. Daley was also executive director of the Friends of Lincoln Park and was the president of the Mid-North Association. In 1993, she became the chief of staff of the 43rd Ward Alderman, Charles Bernardini.

== Election ==
Daley was elected in 1999 to replace Alderman Charles Bernardini, for whom she was Chief of Staff. In the past Lincoln Park elected a more liberal breed of Democratic Aldermen than Daley. She has received support from a mix of interest groups, including the National Organization for Women (Chicago chapter), the Fraternal Order of Police and the Chicago Fire Fighters Union, the "Lakefront liberals" organization, the Independent Voters of Illinois-Independent Precinct Organization (IVI-IPO), the Chicago Association of Realtors, and the LGBT newspaper the Windy City Times.

== City Council service ==
Of the 50 aldermen, Daley was one of the most consistent supporters of Mayor Daley, voting along with him 90 percent of the time, which was fourth most often.

Daley was the first Chicago Alderman to post the street cleaning schedule on her website and the first to send residents email alerts before cleanings. In a 2010 investigation by Fox Chicago, Alderman Daley earned a perfect score for her timely response to an array of constituent requests.

=== Opposition to "Big Box" ordinance ===
Daley, along with 13 other Aldermen voted against the 2006 big-box retailer "living wage" ordinance which would have requiring different wage standards for employees of large retail stores.

=== 2003 balcony collapse ===
Daley was quoted in The New York Times commenting on the deadliest porch collapse in United States history. On June 29, 2003, early in Daley's second term, in the 43rd ward, an overloaded balcony collapsed during a party in an apartment building, killing thirteen people and seriously injuring fifty-seven others.

=== Soccer field for private school in Lincoln Park ===
In summer of 2007, Daley received media coverage regarding a controversial public land use issue, in which a private K-12 school, the Latin School of Chicago, tried to build a soccer field in part of Lincoln Park in the 43rd ward.

=== Bubble Zone Ordinance ===
After receiving complaints about the increase in the size and "viciousness" of anti-abortion protests from a Near North Side Planned Parenthood, Daley introduced a Bubble zone ordinance that was successfully passed on October 7, 2010. The ordinance creates a protection zone within a 50 ft (15 m). radius of the entrance to any hospital, medical clinic or healthcare facility. Within that zone, no one could get closer than 8 feet (2.4 m) to pass materials, display signs, protest, educate or counsel another person without their consent. Those who violate the ordinance can face up to a $500 fine. This law was modeled after a much stricter Colorado law whose "bubble zone" is 100 feet. Alderman Daley was recognized for her work in passing the "Bubble Zone" ordinance by Planned Parenthood of Illinois at their annual Roe v. Wade anniversary celebration. Sex researcher, columnist and book author Debby Herbenick, Master of Ceremonies noted, "The fact that people are physically and/or emotionally harassed when simply seeking the health care to which we are all entitled is frightening, and that's why this ordinance is such an important victory."

The law has been challenged on Constitutional grounds by both pro-lifers and the American Civil Liberties Union

=== Historic Landmark Preservation ===
Alderman Daley served on the City Council Committee on Historical Landmark Preservation. During her tenure there were 16 areas in the 43rd Ward that were designated Historic Landmarks including the Armitage-Halsted District. The Armitage-Halsted District was designated a Chicago Landmark on February 5, 2003, and features bay windows and corner turrets with conical roofs.

=== Branch banking zoning regulation ===
Daley drafted and helped pass legislation opposing banks opening within 600 feet (180 m) of each other.

=== Chicago Sculpture Exhibit ===
In 2001, Daley founded the Chicago Sculpture Exhibit, a free, neighborhood art exhibition which installs sculptures in public spaces in Lincoln Park, Chicago and Lake View, Chicago.

== Vi Daley papers ==
During Daley's three terms as 43rd Ward Alderman, Daley's office contributed to the Vi Daley papers held by DePaul University Special Collections and Archives. The collection includes materials related to Lincoln Park urban planning, CTA redevelopment, and historic preservation projects.

Political offices
Preceded by Charles Bernardini	Member of the Chicago City Council; 43rd Ward; 1999–2011	Succeeded by Michelle Smith
