= 1990 Cook County Board of Commissioners election =

- November 6, 1990

All 17 seats on the Cook County Board of Commissioners 9 seats needed for a majority
	First party	Second party	Third party
Party	Democratic	Republican	Harold Washington
Seats before	10	7	0
Seats won	11	6	0
Seat change	▲1	▼1	Steady
Popular vote	5,212,283	3,048,275	915,432
Percentage	56.80%	33.22%	9.98%
Swing	▼4.1%	▼2.07%	new

The 1990 Cook County Board of Commissioners election saw all seventeen seats of the Cook County Board of Commissioners up for election to four-year terms in two sets of elections (ten elected from an election held in the city of Chicago and seven elected from an election held in suburban Cook County). This was the last election for the Cook County Board of Commissioners done this way, as the board would switch to districts for its 1994 election.

By winning a suburban seat, Democrats increased their majority by a single seat.

The election was held as part of the 1990 Cook County, Illinois, elections.

== City of Chicago ==
Ten seats were elected from the City of Chicago.

=== Democratic primary ===
Cook County Board of Commissioners Chicago Democratic primary
Party	Candidate	Votes	%
Democratic	Jerry "Iceman" Butler (incumbent)	223,426	7.29
Democratic	John H. Stroger, Jr. (incumbent)	186,468	5.82
Democratic	Ted Lechowicz	186,468	5.82
Democratic	Maria Pappas	184,304	5.75
Democratic	R. Eugene Pincham	182,161	5.69
Democratic	Bobbie L. Steele (incumbent)	179,596	5.61
Democratic	Charles R. Bernardini (incumbent)	163,173	5.09
Democratic	Irene C. Hernandez (incumbent)	158,635	4.95
Democratic	Frank A. Damato (incumbent)	152,968	4.78
Democratic	Marco Domico (incumbent)	127,377	3.98
Democratic	Nikki Zollar	120,949	3.78
Democratic	Jesse Lee Butler	108,596	3.39
Democratic	Samuel G. Vaughan (incumbent)	205,454	3.29
Democratic	Stanley T. Kusper, Jr.	103,676	3.24
Democratic	Joseph L. Banks	103,215	3.22
Democratic	Hilda E. Frontay	69,412	2.17
Democratic	Rose-Marie Love (incumbent)	70,571	2.20
Democratic	Timmothy J. Fitzgerald	65,613	2.05
Democratic	James Patrick Nally	60,433	1.89
Democratic	James C. Taylor	59,992	1.87
Democratic	Ernest Terrell	59,264	1.85
Democratic	Johnny Johnson	49,577	1.55
Democratic	Joseph M. Dooley	47,296	1.48
Democratic	Manuel Torres	39,859	1.24
Democratic	Albert Martinez	36,383	1.14
Democratic	James D. Rosas	36,229	1.13
Democratic	Mark S. Boyle	34,649	1.08
Democratic	Bruce E. Crosby	32,808	1.02
Democratic	Emmet J. McShane	31,974	1.00
Democratic	Frank Joseph Murray	31,628	0.99
Democratic	Donald R. Linder	26,340	0.82
Democratic	Walter Warfield, Jr.	20,274	0.63
Democratic	James H. Leatherwood	19,257	0.60
Democratic	George Woodrow Sutton	18,107	0.57

=== Republican primary ===
Cook County Board of Commissioners Chicago Republican primary
Party	Candidate	Votes	%
Republican	Daniel R. Bennett	18,272	10.46
Republican	John J. Holowinski	18,238	10.44
Republican	Denise A. Barnes	17,916	10.26
Republican	Gerald S. Michalek	17,415	9.97
Republican	Wayne M. Haney	17,403	9.97
Republican	Percy V. Coleman	17,389	9.96
Republican	John E. McNeal	17,232	9.87
Republican	William A. Radatz	17,114	9.80
Republican	Jacoby W. Crutcher, Jr.	16,933	9.70
Republican	Donald H. Kahn	16,713	9.57

=== General election ===
Before the general election, Democratic nominee R. Eugene Pincham left to run on the Harold Washington Party slate, and was replaced on the Democratic slate by Danny K. Davis. Republican nominee Percy V. Coleman also switched from their slate to the Harold Washington Party slate.

Cook County Board of Commissioners Chicago election
Party	Candidate	Votes	%
Democratic	Jerry "Iceman" Butler (incumbent)	384,540	7.05
Democratic	Maria Pappas	374,440	6.87
Democratic	Danny K. Davis	371,709	6.82
Democratic	Bobbie L. Steele (incumbent)	356,710	6.54
Democratic	John H. Stroger, Jr. (incumbent)	355,671	6.52
Democratic	Ted Lechowicz	350,252	6.42
Democratic	Charles R. Bernardini (incumbent)	347,324	6.37
Democratic	Irene C. Hernandez (incumbent)	342,093	6.28
Democratic	Frank A. Damato (incumbent)	340,730	6.25
Democratic	Marco Domico (incumbent)	309,089	5.67
Republican	John J. Holowinski	140,703	2.58
Harold Washington	R. Eugene Pincham	138,556	2.54
Republican	Daniel R. Bennett	127,176	2.33
Republican	Gerald S. Michalek	118,062	2.17
Republican	Denise A. Barnes	116,249	2.13
Harold Washington	Robert E. Pincham, Jr.	112,141	2.06
Republican	John E. McNeal	111,552	2.05
Republican	Wayne M. Haney	102,802	1.89
Harold Washington	Barbara J. Norman	102,771	1.89
Republican	William A. Radatz	101,136	1.86
Republican	Donald H. Kahn	94,701	1.74
Republican	Jacoby W. Crutcher, Jr.	91,196	1.67
Harold Washington	Vivian D. Stewart-Tyler	88,539	1.62
Harold Washington	Percy V. Coleman	84,246	1.55
Harold Washington	Helen E. Jones	83,926	1.54
Harold Washington	Mary King Criss	80,020	1.47
Harold Washington	James A. Deanes	77,948	1.43
Harold Washington	Dino F. McNeal	73,673	1.35
Harold Washington	David T. Persons	73,612	1.35

== Suburban Cook County ==
=== Democratic primary ===
Cook County Board of Commissioners suburban Cook County Democratic primary
Party	Candidate	Votes	%
Democratic	Sheila H. Schultz	126,595	13.63
Democratic	Thomas M. O'Donnell	125,696	13.54
Democratic	Patricia Kane McLaughlin	124,096	13.36
Democratic	Richard J. Phelan	118,146	12.72
Democratic	Ervin F. Kozicki	109,626	11.81
Democratic	Edward C. Reinfranck	109,550	11.80
Democratic	Pat Peter Capuzzi	108,387	11.67
Democratic	Lawrence G. Zdarsky	106,460	11.47

=== Republican primary ===
Cook County Board of Commissioners suburban Cook County Republican primary
Party	Candidate	Votes	%
Republican	Carl R. Hansen (incumbent)	101,223	14.11
Republican	Mary M. McDonald (incumbent)	99,894	13.93
Republican	Allan C. Carr (incumbent)	95,978	13.38
Republican	Richard A. Siebel (incumbent)	94,638	13.19
Republican	Aldo A. DeAngelis	85,395	11.90
Republican	Harold L. Tyrell (incumbent)	85,003	11.85
Republican	Herbert T. Schumann, Jr. (incumbent)	84,087	11.72
Republican	William L. Russ	71,120	9.91

=== General election ===
Republican nominee Harold L. Tyrell was replaced on the ballot by Angelo Saviano.

Cook County Board of Commissioners suburban Cook County election
Party	Candidate	Votes	%
Republican	Mary M. McDonald (incumbent)	326,865	8.78
Republican	Aldo A. DeAngelis	314,466	8.44
Republican	Carl R. Hansen (incumbent)	313,917	8.43
Democratic	Richard J. Phelan	298,067	8.00
Republican	Richard A. Siebel (incumbent)	294,886	7.92
Republican	Herbert T. Schumann, Jr. (incumbent)	273,368	7.34
Republican	Allan C. Carr (incumbent)	268,823	7.22
Democratic	Patricia Kane McLaughlin	256,494	6.89
Republican	Angelo "Skip" Saviano	252,373	6.78
Democratic	Sheila H. Schultz	246,986	6.63
Democratic	Pat Capuzzi	233,521	6.27
Democratic	Thomas M. O'Donnell	225,171	6.05
Democratic	Ervin F. Kozicki	210,196	5.64
Democratic	Edward C. Reinfranck	209,290	5.62

== Summarizing statistics ==
Contest summary
Party	Seats held before	Candidates nominated	Seats won
Democratic	10	17	11
Republican	7	17	6
Harold Washington	0	10	0
Total	17	44	17

Fate of incumbents
Party	Total incumbents	Incumbents that sought reelection/retired	Incumbents that won/lost re-nomination in primaries	Incumbents that were renominated
Democratic	10	9 sought reelection 1 retired	7 won re-nomination 2 lost re-nomination	7 won reelection 0 lost reelection
Republican	7	6 sought reelection 1 retired	6 won re-nomination 0 lost re-nomination	5 won reelection 1 withdrew 0 lost reelection
no Harold Washington incumbents
Total	17	15 sought reelection 2 retired	13 won re-nomination 2 lost re-nomination	12 won reelection 0 lost reelection

Composition of elected board (returning/newly elected members)
Party	Returning members	Newly elected members	Total members
Democratic	7	4	11
Republican	5	1	6
Harold Washington	0	0	0
Total	12	5	17
