= Elizabeth Brackett =

American journalist (1941–2018)

- Born: Elizabeth Everett; December 11, 1941
- Died: June 17, 2018 (aged 76); Chicago, Illinois, U.S.
- Education: Indiana University Bloomington; Our Lady of the Lake College
- Occupations: Journalist, political writer
- Years active: 1970–2018
- Employer: Public Broadcasting Service
- Television: Chicago Tonight; The NewsHour with Jim Lehrer
- Children: 2
- Awards: Peabody Award (1988)

Elizabeth E. Brackett (née Everett; December 11, 1941 – June 17, 2018) was an American journalist and political figure and writer. She was known for hosting WTTW's Chicago Tonight program, and also worked as a correspondent for PBS' The NewsHour with Jim Lehrer. In 1988, she won a Peabody Award with her coverage of the 1988 U.S. presidential election.

Brackett was also an unsuccessful Chicago politician, having campaigned for William Singer as mayor in 1975 and making her own unsuccessful bid for committeewoman in the 43rd ward in 1976.

== Early life and education ==
Brackett attended New Trier High School in Winnetka, Illinois, and earned an undergraduate degree from Indiana University Bloomington. While at Indiana University, she was the only woman on the diving team. She held a master's degree in social work from Our Lady of the Lake College.

== Early career ==
After graduating from Our Lady of the Lake College, Brackett worked part-time as a social worker at the YMCA in the Uptown neighborhood of Chicago. She also worked for the Illinois Department of Children and Family Services as a social worker and as a community organizer in Uptown.

In 1972, Brackett was a delegate to the Democratic presidential convention in Miami, along with Jesse Jackson and William Singer. In 1975, she was a fundraiser and advance director for Singer's unsuccessful bid to be mayor of Chicago. In 1976, she unsuccessfully ran for a seat as a committeewoman in Chicago's 43rd ward.

== Journalism career ==
In 1977, Brackett took a job as a researcher on the assignment desk of WBBM-TV in Chicago. In 1979, she joined WGN-TV in Chicago. She later became a reporter at WLS-TV in Chicago. She then joined the forerunner to PBS' The NewsHour with Jim Lehrer, based from Chicago, in 1984.

Brackett won a national Emmy award in 1987 for her reporting on the U.S. farm crisis. The following year, she won a national Peabody Award for her coverage of the 1988 presidential election. She also has won three Midwest Emmy awards and two Peter Lisagor awards as well.

In 1991, Brackett began appearing occasionally on WTTW's Chicago Tonight public-affairs program. In 1994, she became a full-time a correspondent. Under the agreement, she was permitted to contribute to what would eventually become The NewsHour.

From 2000 until 2001, Brackett, along with journalist and comedian Aaron Freeman, co-hosted a science-themed spin-off of Chicago Tonight called Chicago Tomorrow.

In 2009, she published her book Pay to Play: How Rod Blagojevich Turned Political Corruption Into a National Sideshow about the former Illinois governor.

== Personal life ==
Brackett married Peter Martinez on September 27, 1998. A previous marriage ended in divorce. She had two children from her first marriage: Elisabeth (born circa 1967) and Jon (born circa 1970). She lived in the Hyde Park neighborhood of Chicago. She has two sisters Ellen Everett Rieger and Jill Everett Swisher.

Brackett was also a World Champion Triathlete; she took the title in 2009 held in Sydney. In December 2017, she appeared in Sports Illustrated's 'Faces in the Crowd' for her strong showing at a triathlon in Rotterdam, Netherlands.

=== Death ===
Brackett was injured in an apparent accident while biking on the Chicago Lakefront Trail on June 13, 2018. She fractured a neck vertebra, fell into a coma and was hospitalized at Stroger Hospital. She died there four days later, aged 76.
