= Neely Building =

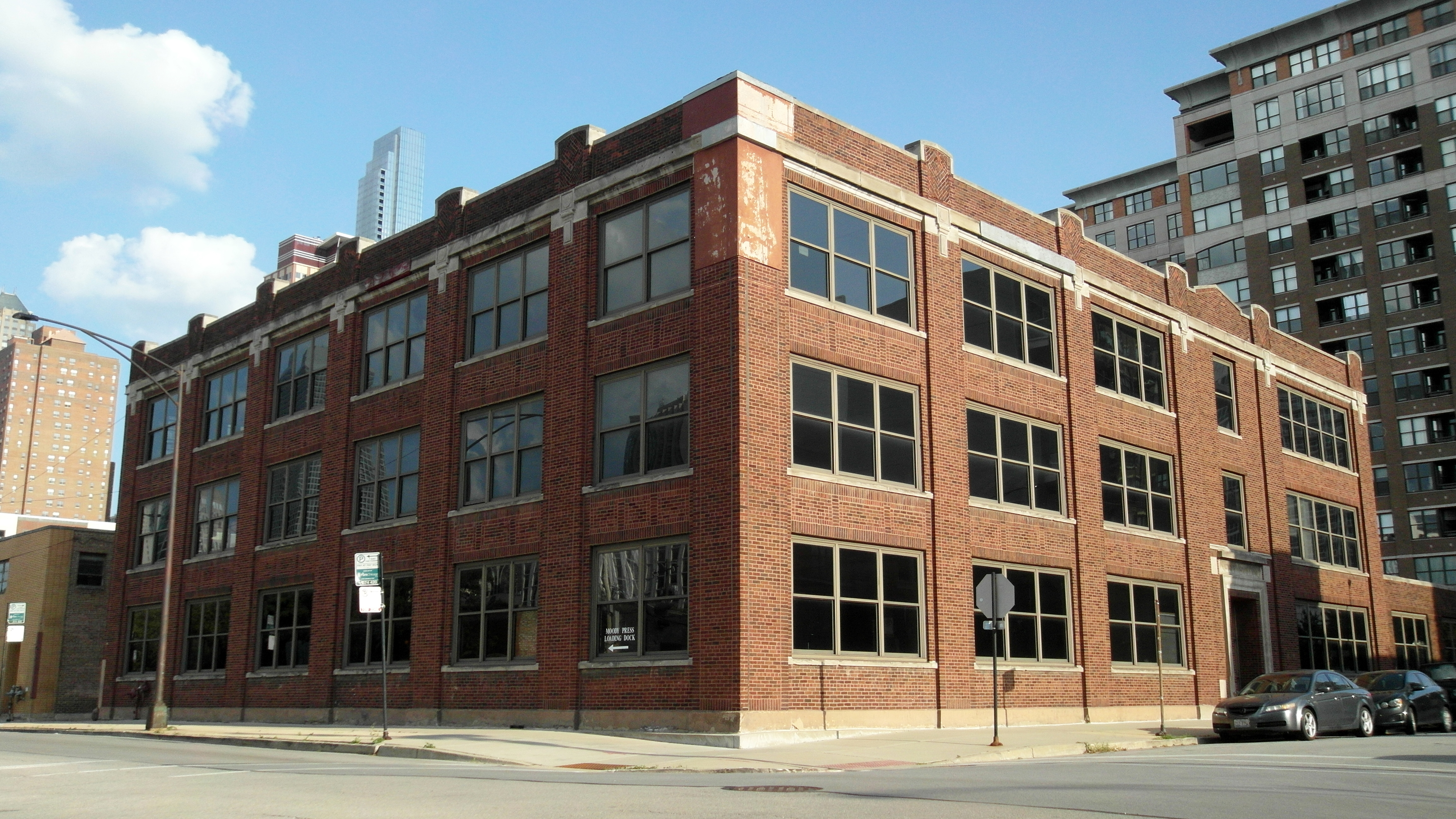
- Interactive map of the Neely Building area

General information
- Location: 871 N. Franklin Street, Chicago, Illinois
- Coordinates: 41°53′55.8″N 87°38′08.1″W
- Completed: 1922

Technical details
- Floor count: 3

Design and construction
- Architects: Fugard & Knapp

The Neely Building is a building at 871 N. Franklin Street in Chicago's Near North Side. It was designed by Fugard & Knapp and was built in 1922 at a cost of $110,000 ($2,115,805 in today's dollars). The building originally housed the Neely Printing Company. An addition was built in 1936, and a one-story wing was built in 1941, both designed by Thielbar & Fugard. It would occupy the entire block. A fourth story addition was planned in 1946.

The building was later owned by Moody Bible Institute. In July 2019, Moody Bible Institute announced they intended to sell the Neely Building and other nearby properties. In February 2020, it was reported that JDL Development had entered into preliminary agreement to purchase Moody's properties.
