= Lakefront liberals =

Chicago voting bloc

Lakefront liberals is a voting bloc in the city of Chicago that was prominent in the 1970s and 1980s.

== Description ==
Lakefront liberals are described as geographically residing along the lakefront of Chicago in neighborhoods such as Lake View and Lincoln Park. Some included the South Side lakefront neighborhood Hyde Park as another area of Chicago where they resided.

In 1987, the Chicago Tribune described lakefront liberals as a "loose-knit coalition" that had arisen in the late-1960s. In a 2015 Chicago magazine article, Whet Moser described lakefront liberals as having predominantly consisted of white professionals, many of whom were born during the baby boom. He also described their binding beliefs as having included "good government" and racial equality.

Retrospectively, Chicago journalist and activist Don Rose opined in the 2020s that the Lakefront Liberal bloc had in part arisen out of the protests held during the 1968 Democratic National Convention in Chicago.

== Electoral impact in the 1970s and 1980s ==
Lakefront liberals were credited with the two-term election of 44th Ward alderman Dick Simpson in the 1970s. Simpson was aligned with their bloc. Another alderman considered a lakefront liberal was William Singer, who in the 1970s represented the 43rd and later 44th ward. Other aldermen considered lakefront liberals included Martin J. Oberman (43rd ward, 1975–87) and David Orr (49th ward, 1979–90 and later a long-serving Cook County Clerk). In 1987, the Chicago Tribune] described newly elected aldermen Edwin Eisendrath (Oberman's successor in the 43rd ward) and Kathy Osterman (of the 48th ward) as having run as "Lakefront independents".

Lakefront liberals were credited with contributing to the elections of Harold Washington in 1983 and 1987. However, in the first election, while Washington had performed competitively in the vote of the 43rd ward in both the primary and general elections, he was still outperformed by his general election opponent Bernard Epton in that Ward. During the 1987 Democratic mayoral primary, both Washington and his challenger, former mayor Jane Byrne, actively pursued the lakefront liberal vote.

A large portion of the northern lakefront was represented by Illinois's 9th congressional district, which the Chicago Tribune described in the late 1980s as being among the nation's most liberal congressional districts (particularly in Democratic primary elections). For 48 years (1949–1963, 1965–1999) the district was represented by Democratic congressman Sidney R. Yates, regarded to be a very liberal member of the U.S. House.

== Modern status ==
A 1989 article in the New York Times cast doubt on the continued presence of the lakefront liberal bloc in Lincoln Park and the 43rd ward, writing,

The Lincoln Park neighborhood, for example, where townhouses valued at $500,000 are becoming more common, once served as the apotheosis of liberal, anti-Democratic [Party] machine sentiment. But in 1987 in the general election [for mayor] the ward rejected Mr. Washington by a 2-to-1 ratio in favor of Edward Vrdolyak, a conservative former Alderman who has since joined the Republican Party.

In the 2010s, some political writers again questioned whether lakefront liberals had become largely extinct. In November 2015, Whet Mose wrote an article in Chicago magazine which questioned whether Rahm Emanuel's "sweep of the affluent lakefront wards" in the 2015 mayoral election signaled a "death knell" for the lakefront liberal bloc. He also posited a hypothesis that the voting bloc might have not coalesced in the 1970s due to support for progressive policy so much as it had coalesced around an anti-machine sentiment. With Emanuel being regarded as an "establishment" politician, his sweep of those wards would evidence a departure against the trends of the 1970s and 1980s. Edward McClell similarly wrote of a possible death of the voting bloc as a force in the lakefront wards in a late-2019 Chicago magazine article. He argued that lakefront neighborhoods on the North Side of Chicago have become among of the wealthiest neighborhoods in Chicago, and had also become some of the most conservative-leaning neighborhoods. North side lakefront communities were among the most supportive areas for Emanuel in his elections. McClell wrote that it is theorized that much of the former lakefront liberals voting base left the geographic area that the coalition once occupied, after being priced-out, moving to neighborhoods such as Wicker Park, Logan Square, and Avondale, making up part of what is now known as the "Milwaukee Avenue Progressives".

Others have believed that the lakefront liberal geographic voting bloc still remains. Some political journalists, such as Fran Spielman of the Chicago Sun-Times, believe that many northern lakefront wards continue to have an electorate that favors progressivism. Some analysts believed that lakefront liberals remained and had supported Rahm Emanuel in his 2011 election. Some writers believed that Lori Lightfoot was the beneficiary of lakefront liberals' support in the 2019 Chicago mayoral election. In the initial round the election, Bill Ruthhart of the Chicago Tribune wrote that her, "base proved to be in the liberal lakefront wards on the North Side." In the initial round, Lightfoot saw particularly strong performances in far north lakefront neighborhoods. Lightfoot also carried the endorsement of former lakefront liberals-supported alderman Dick Simpson. In the runoff of the 2023 Chicago mayoral election, a key portion of the vote that secured liberal Brandon Johnson's victory against a more conservative opponent was from voters in the northern lakefront wards. Johnson had also performed strongly in these areas during the preliminary round of the election.
