= Michele Smith (politician) =

American politician

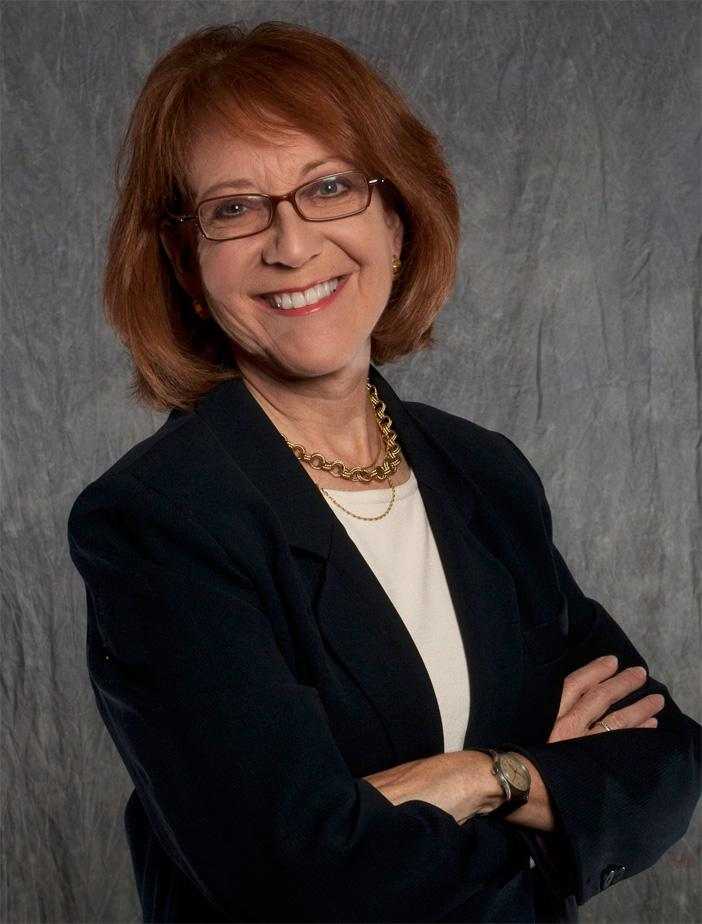

Member of the Chicago City Council from the 43rd ward
- In office May 16, 2011 – August 12, 2022
- Preceded by: Vi Daley
- Succeeded by: Timmy Knudsen

Personal details
- Born: February 12, 1955 (age 71)
- Party: Democratic
- Education: University at Buffalo (BA); University of Chicago (JD)

Michele Smith (born February 12, 1955) is an American politician, who served as a member of the Chicago City Council from 2011 to 2022. She represented the 43rd ward on Chicago's North Side, including much of Lincoln Park and a small portion of the Near North Side.

== Background ==
Smith earned a bachelor's degree in political science from SUNY Buffalo in 1976, and a J.D. from the University of Chicago Law School in 1979. After graduating from law school, she clerked for Judge William J. Bauer of the United States Court of Appeals for the Seventh Circuit for two years and then joined the U.S. Attorney's Office in Chicago. During her time, she prosecuted over 400 narcotics, white-collar, and political corruption cases. Beginning in 1989, Smith worked for the Navistar International Corporation, rising to General Counsel for the Engine Group.

== Political career ==
=== 43rd Ward Democratic Committeeman ===
In 2008, Smith was elected to serve as Democratic Committeeman of Chicago's 43rd Ward and was re-elected in 2012.

=== Chicago City Council (2011−22) ===
In 2011, Smith ran for 43rd Ward Alderman and assumed office on May 16, 2011. She was re-elected in 2015 and 2019.

Smith resigned in August 2022, citing "deepening responsibilities toward family and friends." On September 19, 2022, Mayor Lori Lightfoot announced she would appoint Timmy Knudsen, chair of the city's Zoning Board of Appeals, to replace Smith, pending confirmation by the City Council.

== Committee assignments ==
Smith sat on eight City Council Committees:

- Ethics and Government Oversight (chair)
- Budget and Government Operations
- Committees and Rules
- Environmental Protection and Energy
- Finance
- Human Relations and Health
- License and Consumer Protection
- Public Safety
