= Lewis Manilow =

American film producer

Lewis Manilow (born Irvin Inger; August 11, 1927 – December 12, 2017) was an American attorney, real estate developer, and arts patron.

== Biodata ==
Manilow was known as one of the founders of the Museum of Contemporary Art, Chicago. He helped fund the Museum of Contemporary Art, Chicago, in collaboration with Joseph Randall Shapiro and other contemporary art collectors in 1967 when Hugh Hefner made the former Playboy Enterprises-owned space on 237 E. Ontario St. available.

He was a principal backer and longtime honorary president of Chicago's Goodman Theatre and the developer of the town of University Park, Illinois, where he was instrumental in the creation of the Nathan Manilow Sculpture Park, a monumental internationally recognized outdoor sculpture park at Governors State University.

Manilow was a lifetime trustee of the Art Institute of Chicago, served as a member of the U.S. Advisory Commission on Public Diplomacy, and served on the boards of the National Democratic Institute for International Affairs, the Progressive Policy Institute, the Visiting Committee of the University of Chicago's Harris School of Public Policy, and the executive committee of the Chicago Community Trust.

Manilow was awarded the National Medal of Arts in 2000.

== Personal life ==
In 1970 Manilow married his second wife, Susan (née Rosenberg), who came from a powerful West Side Jewish political family, former wife of Edwin W. Eisendrath Jr. and the mother of Edwin Eisendrath. The two were married for almost half a century, until his death.
