= Charles Bernardini =

American politician

Charles Bernardini is an American attorney and politician who served in local office in Chicago. He served on the Chicago City Council as the alderman for Chicago's 43rd Ward from 1993 to 1999, and as a Democratic member of the Cook County Board of Commissioners representing Chicago from 1986 to 1992.

== Early life and career ==
He graduated from Streator Township High School and was named in 2022 to the Streator High School Hall of Fame. He earned a Bachelor of Arts from University of Illinois Urbana-Champaign and a juris doctor from University of Illinois College of Law. He served as an aide to Speaker W. Robert Blair during the 77th Illinois General Assembly. An attorney, he served as a legal staffer for American Hospital Supply Corp, a special prosecutor for voter fraud, as counsel for Allstate Insurance Company, and as an instructor at Loyola University Chicago's campus in Rome.

== Political career ==
He served as the statewide Chair of the Independent Voters of Illinois - Independent Precinct Organization IVI-IPO from 1978 to 1979 during which time he campaigned against the Cutback Amendment. In 1986, as a Democrat supported by Mayor Harold Washington, Bernardini was elected to the Cook County Board of Commissioners as one of ten at-large members from Chicago. He had run in the Democratic primary election with Washington's endorsement and without support from the Cook County Democratic Party (being excluded from their endorsed slate by ahead of the primary). He was re-elected to a second term in 1990. He resigned from the County Board in January 1992 to take a position as managing director of the American Chamber of Commerce in Milano, Italy. The other nine Chicago commissioners appointed John P. Daley to the vacancy.

In November 1993, Richard M. Daley appointed Bernardini to succeed Edwin Eisendrath as Alderman from Chicago's 43rd ward. He was elected to a full term in 1995. He did not run for reelection in 1999. He was succeeded by Vi Daley. He served as President of the Italian Chamber of Commerce of the Midwest, in Chicago, from 2006 to 2009.

In 2013, Italian President Giorgio Napolitano conferred upon him the title of Knight of the Order of Merit of the Italian Republic.

Emilia-Romagna Region President Stefano Bonaccini appointed him as a member of the Consulta of Emiliano-Romagnoli in the World.

He has received the keys to the city of both Porretta Terme (for which he has long served as pro bono counsel to its Soul Music Festival) and Lizzano in Belevedere (home of his paternal grandfather, Benedetto Ciro, who emigrated to Illinois in 1905).

Holding dual citizenship, he frequently publishes in Italian business publications and is invited to address Italian conferences and radio programs regarding the USA.

Political offices
Preceded by Edwin Eisendrath	Member of the Chicago City Council; 43rd Ward	Succeeded by Vi Daley
