= Edwin Eisendrath =

American politician

Member of the Chicago City Council from the 43rd ward
- In office 1987 – 1993
- Preceded by: Martin J. Oberman
- Succeeded by: Charles Bernardini

Personal details
- Born: February 3, 1958 (age 68) Chicago, Illinois
- Party: Democratic
- Spouse: Jennifer Schulze (m. 1994)
- Children: Three
- Education: Harvard University (B.A.); National Louis University (M.A.)

Edwin Eisendrath (born February 3, 1958) is former CEO of the Chicago Sun-Times and former alderman of the 43rd ward of Chicago (Lincoln Park area).

== Early life ==
Edwin Eisendrath III was born into a Jewish family, the son of Edwin W. Eisendrath Jr. and Susan Rosenberg. His father was an attorney and his mother came from a powerful West Side political family. Eisendrath's younger brother is television producer and writer John Eisendrath. Eisendrath's parents divorced when he was a child (in 1970), and his mother married Lewis Manilow.

Eisendrath was raised in the East Lake View neighborhood of Chicago. After graduating from Harvard University, he taught in public schools in both Appalacia and later Chicago's Wicker Park neighborhood. In 1983, he earned a Master of Arts in teaching at National Louis University.

== Chicago City Council ==
In 1987 (at the age 29), Eisendrath successfully ran to succeed the retiring Martin J. Oberman as alderman (city councilor) in Chicago's 43rd ward. The race between him and attorney Robert Perkins was dubbed by observers as the "Battle of the Blue Bloods", as both young candidates came from wealthy and well-connected families. Eisendrath raised $225,000 for her campaign, and his campaign spent what was at the time an all-time record amount for a Chicago City Council campaign. As a candidate, Eisendrath's platform focused on city finances and school reform. He promised that he would be neutral in the Chicago Council Wars, not joining either of the council's warring political factions. He was described by the Chicago Tribune as positioning himself to be a "Lakefront independent". He was re-elected in 1991.

Eisendrath backed the Chicago School Reform Act, legislation enacted by the state of Illinois in 1988 to reform Chicago Public Schools. Among the changes that it made was removing academic tenure from principals, and creating Local School Councils to which principals had to answer.

Eisendrath endorsed the ward redistricting map proposed by Mayor Richard M. Daley when it was put to a public vote via a 1992 referendum. The referendum offered Chicagoans the unusual opportunity to provide input in the redistricting, allowing them to vote between two options. Rather than providing voters a visual representation of each of the two options, the phrasing of the question on the ballot provided voters with a list of the aldermen that supported each respective map. Eisendrath supported the option preferred by Mayor Daley.

=== 1990 congressional campaign ===
Eisendrath ran in the 1990 Democratic primary election for the U.S. House of Representatives in Illinois's 9th congressional district, challenging longtime incumbent Sidney Yates. Eisendrath ran an anti-incumbent campaign focused on the decades-long length of Yates' tenure. He also made an issue of Yates' advanced age. Eisendrath lost in a landslide.

== Subsequent career in government, politics, and education ==
In October 1993, Eisenhdrath resigned as alderman to become the administrator for the Region V office of the Department of Housing and Urban Development (HUD) in Chicago, one of HUD's largest and busiest offices. He later served as Vice President of Academic Affairs for Kendall College but resigned the position in 2007.

From 2007 to 2017, Eisendrath was an international business consultant with a focus on global higher education.

== 2006 gubernatorial campaign ==
Eisendrath sought the Democratic nomination for Governor of Illinois in 2006, but was defeated in the primary by incumbent governor Rod Blagojevich.

== CEO of the Chicago Sun-Times (2017–2019) ==
In 2017, Eisendrath led a group, including retired WLS-TV anchor Linda Yu and the Chicago Federation of Labor, to place a bid for the Chicago Sun-Times newspaper. It was announced July 13 that the group, ST Acquisition Holdings LLC, purchased the Sun-Times. Shortly thereafter, Eisendrath was named the new chief executive officer of the newspaper.

In January 2018, Eisendrath hired Mark Konkol as executive editor of then-Sun-Times-owned Chicago Reader Konkol soon published an issue with racist cover and Eisendrath fired Konkol. Later in 2018, Eisendrath resigned as CEO after meeting his original goals stating "Not only did we stop the (Tribune) merger, we successfully relocated, rebranded, restructured”.

== Later career ==
In 2019, Eisendrath helped launch Verifiable, a company that uses advanced technologies to provide real-time license verification and continuous monitoring of healthcare providers to increase efficiency and reduce compliance costs to hospitals and other health care organization.

Most recently, Eisendrath is guest hosting at the progressive Chicago radio station WCPT820am.

== Patents ==
Edwin is an inventor on several issued and pending US and international patents related to virtual on-line universities.

Political offices
Preceded by Martin J. Oberman	Member of the Chicago City Council; 43rd Ward; 1987 – 1993	Succeeded by Charles Bernardini
