= William D. Burns =

American politician and businessman (born 1973)

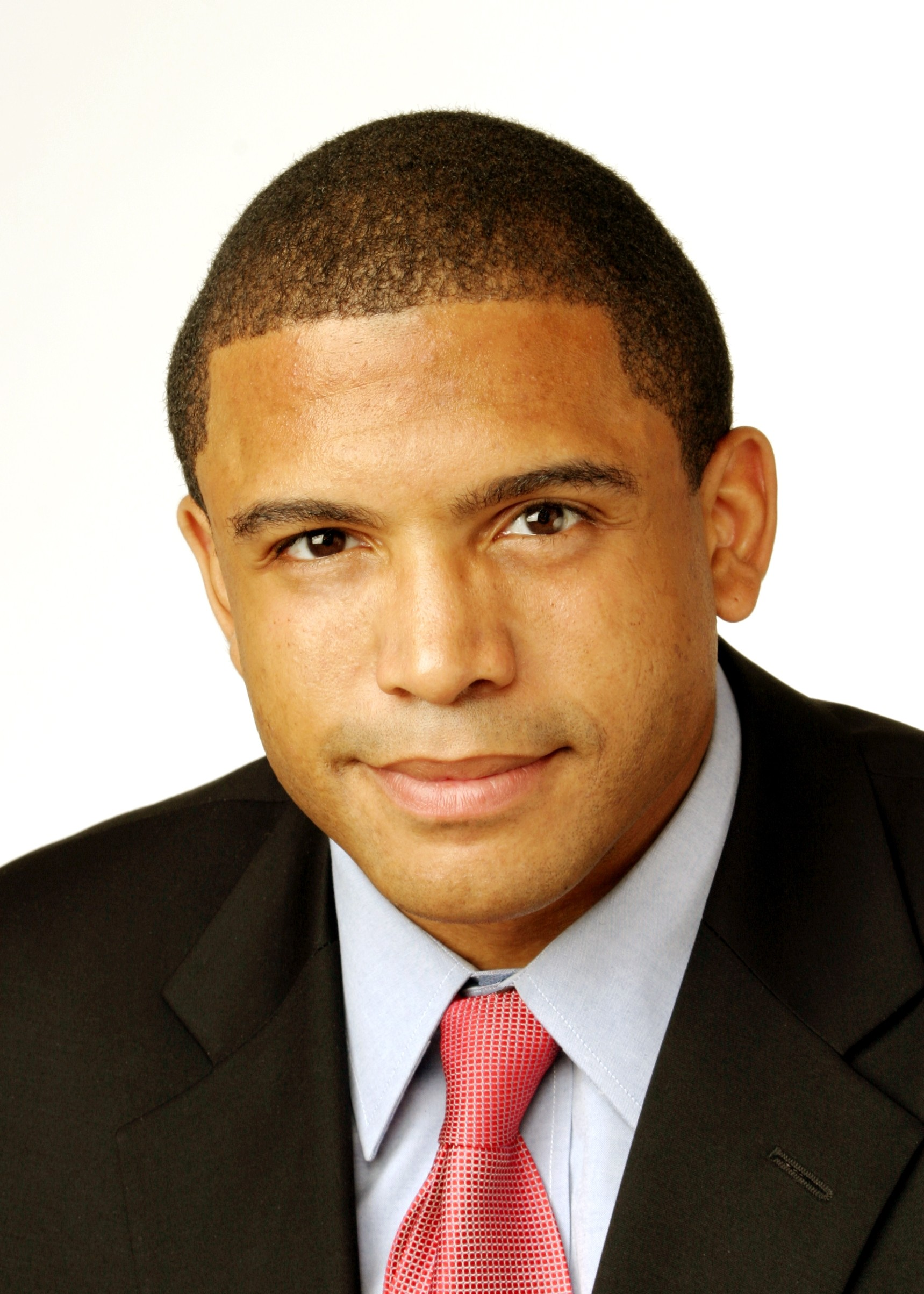
- 2013 portrait of Burns

Chicago Alderman from the 4th ward
- In office May 2011 – February 2016
- Preceded by: Shirley Newsome
- Succeeded by: Sophia King

Member of the Illinois House of Representatives from the 26th district
- In office January 2009 – May 2011
- Preceded by: Elga L. Jefferies
- Succeeded by: Kimberly du Buclet

Personal details
- Born: August 22, 1973 (age 53) Cleveland, Ohio
- Party: Democratic
- Children: Athena
- Education: University of Chicago

William D. Burns (born August 22, 1973 in Cleveland, Ohio) is an American politician and businessman, a former member of the Chicago City Council, representing Chicago's 4th ward, and the State House. A member of the Democratic Party, Burns represented the 26th District in the Illinois House of Representatives from 2008 through 2011. After winning election as an alderman on February 22, 2011, he resigned as a state legislator. In February 2016, Alderman Burns announced his resignation from the Chicago City Council to take a job with Airbnb.

== Background ==
Burns was born in Cleveland, where he attended local schools. He relocated to Chicago to attend college and graduate school, studying at the University of Chicago, where he received both his B.A. and M.A. degrees.

Becoming involved in Democratic Party politics, Burns served as a former Deputy Chief of Staff and Senior Advisor to Emil Jones, the Illinois Senate President. Burns was Vice President of Program and Field Offices for the Chicago Urban League. Burns has also served as an Education and Tax Policy Manager for the Metropolitan Planning Council, a community outreach coordinator for State Senator Barack Obama, and the Deputy Campaign Manager for Obama for Congress 2000.

== Illinois State Representative ==
In 2008 Burns challenged incumbent State Representative Elga Jeffries, and defeated her in the Democratic Primary on "Super Tuesday." He defeated perennial candidate Sylvester "Junebug" Hendricks in the general election. As a State Representative, Burns has served on committees addressing education, health care, and government reform. Burns also sponsored the first green jobs program in the United States which was specifically targeted to low-income urban areas. The Urban Weatherization Jobs Initiative employs inner-city residents in the weatherization of homes and other buildings on the South Side of Chicago. Burns also has supported reform to Illinois's campaign finance laws, strengthening gun control, and reform to the property tax system.

== Campaign for Alderman of Chicago's Fourth Ward ==
In November 2010, five-term Alderman Toni Preckwinkle was elected Cook County Board President. Community leader Shirley Newsome was appointed by Chicago Mayor Richard M. Daley to serve the remainder of Preckwinkle's term, but did not seek a full term.

With Preckwinkle's support, Burns entered the race for Alderman in the February 22, 2011, first round of the municipal election, choosing against a temporary appointment for the remainder of Preckwinkle's term. Burns faced five Democratic or independent opponents, and Lori Yokoyama, who was endorsed by the Chicago GOP and Chicago Young Republicans. Burns won the race with 64.6% of the vote in the February 22nd election. Burns served as a delegate to the 2012 Democratic National Convention.

== Aldermanic Committees ==
- Rules and Ethics
- Finance
- Housing and Real Estate
- Pedestrian and Traffic Safety
- Transportation and Public Way
- Workforce Development and Audit

== Private Sector ==
While alderman, Burns moonlighted for a public affairs consulting firm founded by one of President Barack Obama's top advisers. Then in February 2016, Burns announced his departure from the Chicago City Council to take join Airbnb as "director, Midwest policy and senior adviser", starting March 1, 2016. However, after he left office, the Chicago Ethics Board had reason to believe that Burns violated a city prohibitions against lobbying the city for a full calendar year after leaving the City Council. The board published a settlement with Burns of a $5000 fine without an admission of wrongdoing in 2019. As a member of the City's Ethics Reform Task Force Burns had helped author the City’s ethics ordinance.

== Family ==
Burns has one daughter, Athena.

== Electoral history ==
=== State House ===
Election	Candidate	Votes	Percent	Candidate	Votes	Percent	Candidate	Votes	Percent	Candidate	Votes	Percent	Candidate	Votes	Percent
2008 Democratic Primary	William D. Burns	9,063	33.09%	Kenny Johnson	7,653	27.94%	Phillip Jackson	4,912	17.94%	Elga L. Jefferies (i)	3,270	11.94%	Paul Chadha	2,489	9.09%
2008 General	William D. Burns (D)	41,807	86.06%	Sylvester "Junebug" Hendricks (R)	6,770	13.94%									
2010 Democratic Primary	William D. Burns	14,574	100%												
2010 General	William D. Burns (D)	29,914	83.48%	Sylvester "Junebug" Hendricks (R)	5,290	16.52%									

=== Aldermanic ===
2011 4th ward aldermanic election
Candidate	Votes	%
William D. "Will" Burns	8,557	64.62
Lori S. Yokoyama	1,276	9.61
Norman H. Bolden	1,250	9.42
Brian Scott	961	7.24
George Rumsey	637	4.80
Adam L. Miguest	388	2.92
James E. Williams	184	1.39
Total	13,273	100

2015 4th ward aldermanic election
Candidate	Votes	%
William D. "Will" Burns (incumbent)	6,353	55.59
Tracey Y. Bey	2,862	25.04
Norman H. Bolden	2,214	19.37
Total	11,429	100
