= Elga L. Jefferies =

American politician (born 1946)

Member of the Illinois House of Representatives from the 26th district
- In office June 3, 2006 – January 14, 2009
- Preceded by: Lovana Jones
- Succeeded by: William D. Burns

Member of the Illinois Senate from the 3rd district
- In office December 19, 2002 ― January 8, 2003
- Preceded by: Margaret Smith
- Succeeded by: Mattie Hunter

Personal details
- Born: July 10, 1946 (age 80) Chicago, Illinois
- Party: Democratic

Elga Lee Jefferies (born July 10, 1946) is an American politician who served as a Democratic Party member of the Illinois House of Representatives, representing the 26th District during the 95th Illinois General Assembly. Jeffries' appointment came following the death of the former Representative, Lovana "Lou" Jones; she then proceeded to be elected to her position in November 2006, but was later defeated in the 2008 primary election, finishing third out of five candidates.

Margaret Smith resigned from the Illinois Senate on December 12, 2002. Jefferies was appointed to succeed her from December 19, 2002, until the winner of the November 2002 general election, Mattie Hunter, was sworn in on January 8, 2003.

On June 3, 2006, Jefferies was appointed to succeed the late Lovana Jones. Her agenda during her tenure in the House focused on physical and mental healthcare, affordable housing, and providing access to education for adults who did not complete high school.

Jefferies has been involved in community activities since her young adult years, working with organizations such as the Palmer House for Boys, the Near North Organization, Operation P.U.S.H., the Task Force for Black Empowerment, the National Democratic Organization, and the Bronzeville Merchants Association, serving as Deputy Mayor of Bronzeville. She is a member of the Illinois Legislative Black Caucus.

Jefferies voted "present" in the impeachment of Governor Rod Blagojevich on January 9, 2009.
