= Mattie Hunter =

American politician (born 1954)

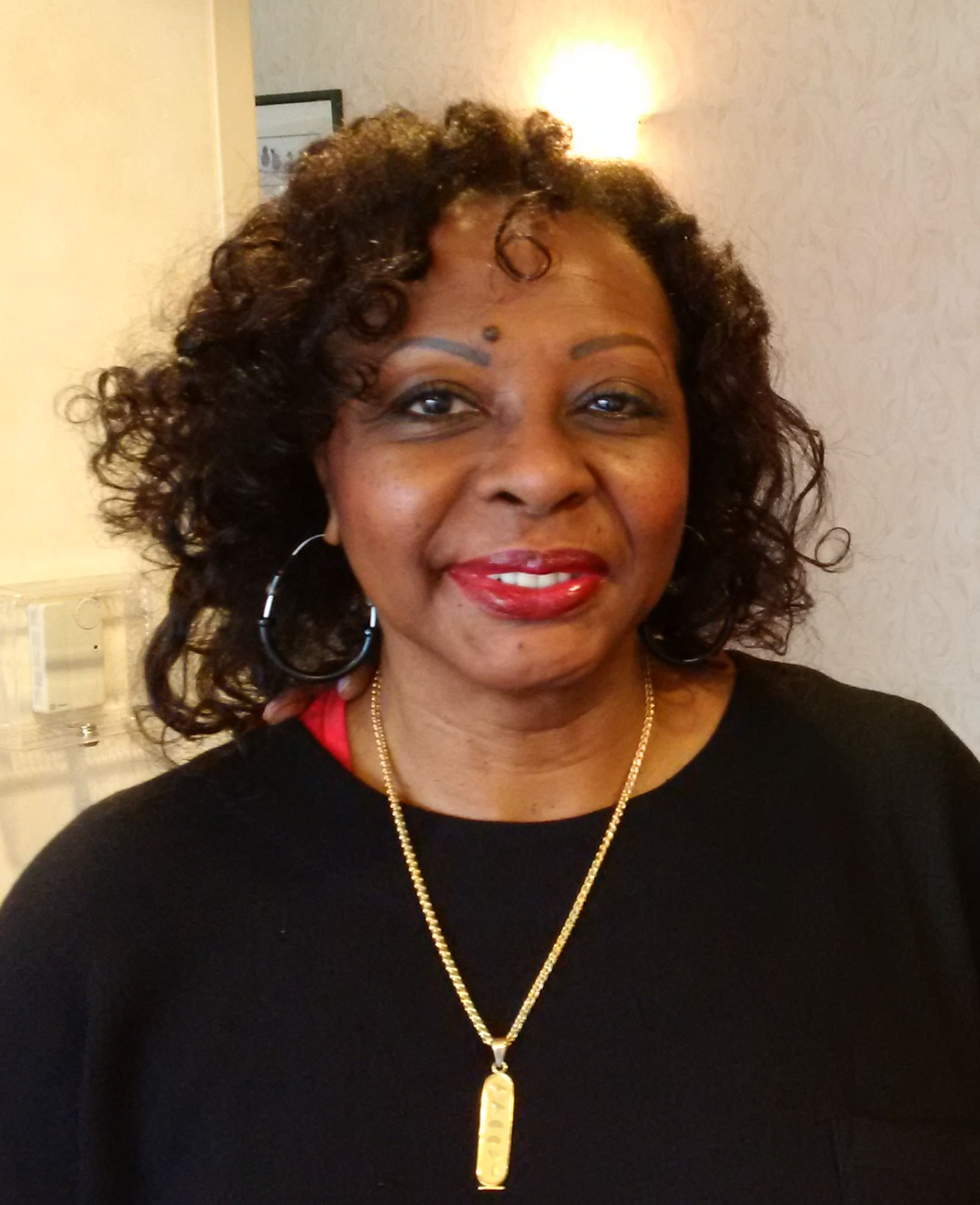

Member of the Illinois Senate from the 3rd district
- Incumbent
- Assumed office January 8, 2003
- Preceded by: Elga L. Jefferies

Personal details
- Born: June 1, 1954 (age 72) Chicago, Illinois, U.S.
- Party: Democratic
- Education: Monmouth College (BA); Jackson State University (MS)

Mattie Hunter (born June 1, 1954) is a Democratic member of the Illinois Senate, representing the 3rd district since 2003. She is the Senate secretary for the Illinois Legislative Black Caucus and the Senate majority caucus whip. Hunter is also the 20th Ward Democratic Committeewoman.

== Biography ==
Hunter is a native of Chicago. She earned a Bachelor of Arts degree in Government (political science) from Monmouth College in 1976 and went on to get a master's degree in Sociology from Jackson State University. She is also a certified alcohol and drug counselor and prevention specialist. From 1982 to 2000, Hunter served in numerous capacities with Human Resources Development Institute, Inc. (HRDI).

She was the managing director of the Center for Health and Human Services located in Johannesburg, South Africa from 1994 to 1996. She participated, coordinated and presented lectures at numerous health and human services conferences in Zimbabwe, Nigeria, and Zambia. Those conferences included Human Resources Development Institute/ South African Department of Health Workshop and the U.S. State Department Alcohol and Drug abuse taskforce.

== Senate career ==
Margaret Smith resigned from the Illinois Senate on December 12, 2002. Elga L. Jefferies was appointed to succeed Smith from December 19, 2002, as Senator from the 3rd district for the remainder of the 92nd General Assembly, while Hunter was appointed the senator-elect and sworn in for the 93rd General Assembly on January 8, 2003. As senator, Hunter has sponsored legislation to ban the sale, distribution, and manufacture of mercury fever thermometers and encouraging the creation of family friendly workshops. She also pushed for legislation that would fund a study to determine the best methods to treat obesity. To honor Illinois native Jane Addams, Hunter helped pass a bill to designate December 10 as Jane Addams Day. Hunter is Vice Chairman of the Senate Health and Human Services Committee, she also serves on the Senate Local Government and Senate Government Committees.

As of July 2022, Senator Hunter is a member of the following Illinois Senator committees:

- (chairwoman of) Appropriations – Criminal Justice Committee (SAPP-SACJ)
- Appropriations – Health Committee (SAPP-SAHA)
- Appropriations Committee (SAPP)
- Behavioral and Mental Health Committee (SBMH)
- Energy and Public Utilities Committee (SENE)
- Ethics Committee (SETH)
- Executive Committee (SEXC)
- Executive Appointments Committee (SEXA)
- Executive – Gaming Committee (SEXC-SESG)
- Executive – Procurement Committee (SEXC-SEOP)
- (chairwoman of) Executive – Special Issues Committee (SEXC-SESI)
- Healthcare Access and Availability Committee (SHAA)
- Redistricting Committee (SRED)
- Redistricting – Chicago South Committee (SRED-SRCS)
- (chairwoman of) Revenue Committee (SREV)
- Transportation Committee (STRN)
