= William Singer =

American politician

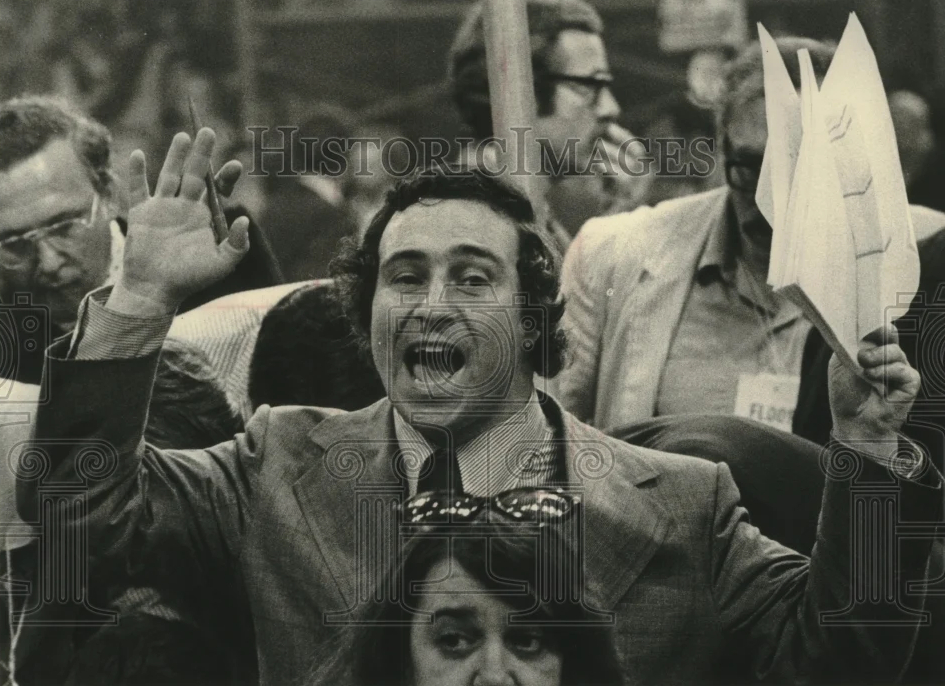
- Singer at the 1972 Democratic National Convention

Chicago Alderman
- In office 1971–1975
- Preceded by: George B. McCutcheon
- Succeeded by: Martin J. Oberman
- Constituency: 43rd Ward
- In office 1969–1971
- Preceded by: Thomas Rosenberg
- Succeeded by: Dick Simpson
- Constituency: 44th Ward

Personal details
- Education: Brandeis University; Columbia Law School
- Profession: Lawyer, politician, consultant, lobbyist

William Singer is an American lawyer, politician, consultant, and lobbyist who formerly served as a Chicago alderman, representing the 44th and 43rd wards during his aldermanic career.

While on the Chicago City Council, Singer was an independent reformer tied to the lakefront liberals. He was an opponent of the political machine that was led by Richard J. Daley. He partnered with Jesse Jackson to successfully have Daley and his slate of delegates unseated as delegates to the 1972 Democratic National Convention and replaced by a slate of delegates backed by Singer and Jackson. This was the biggest political defeat Daley ever endured. In 1975, Singer forwent running for a third term on the City Council and instead, unsuccessfully, challenged Daley in the Democratic Party primary of the 1975 Chicago mayoral election. He has not run for political office since.

After his career in electoral politics, Singer joined the law firm Kirkland & Ellis, where he became a partner. Singer, who had been an outsider of establishment politics, developed a new role as a political insider and a power broker. He formed an alliance with Alderman Ed Vrdolyak, a member of the political establishment, even working with Vrdolyak on drafting ordinances. Singer also aligned himself with Mayor Jane Byrne during her mayoralty. After Richard M. Daley (son of Richard J. Daley) became mayor in 1989, Singer was appointed by him to the interim Chicago Board of Education. Serving as the interim board's vice president, Singer negotiated an historic contract with the city's teachers that promised higher teacher salaries and reforms to the city's school system structure. However, Singer failed to deliver the promised wage increases for teachers.

== Early life and education ==
He was educated at Chicago's Horace Mann Elementary School and South Shore High School before attending Brandeis University and Columbia Law School. Singer is Jewish.

== Early career ==
After graduating law school, he interned in 1964 for Senator Paul Douglas, a liberal Senator belonging to the Democratic Party. He also worked for Robert F. Kennedy's campaign in the 1964 United States Senate election in New York. From 1965 until 1967, he clerked for liberal-leaning U.S. District Judge Hubert Will. In 1968, Singer worked from Chicago on Robert F. Kennedy's presidential campaign.

== Aldermanic career ==
From 1969 to 1971, Singer represented the 44th ward on the North Side.

In 1969, Singer was urged by an independent neighborhood political group to run as an independent candidate for the Chicago City Council. Only 29-years old and a political newcomer, Singer's victory upset the city's Democratic political machine, which was headed by Mayor Richard J. Daley. His victory was by a razor-thin 427 votes in a runoff election against an opponent backed by the Democratic Party organization. Reform-minded, and regarded to be a lakefront liberal, Singer was more liberal than Daley. After his election, Singer was regarded as a leader in the lakefront liberal movement. His election was seen as ushering in an era of prominence for the lakefront liberal voting bloc.

On the Chicago City Council Singer was viewed as a standard bearer of its independents. Singer was a significant member of the Chicago City Council's small but lively minority opposition bloc that opposed the political machine on various matters. Singer managed both to challenge the mayor, but also to maintain cordial relations with some of the mayors top allies, such as Thomas E. Keane.

In 1972, he partnered with Jesse Jackson to lead a coalition of individuals who successfully fought to sit as delegates at the 1972 Democratic National Convention instead of a Daley-led group. They succeeded in booting Daley and his allies from serving as delegates to the convention. This was considered the biggest political blow that Daley faced during his career in politics.

Redistricted, Singer served as alderman of the city's 43rd ward from 1971 to 1975. His election to this ward in 1971 saw him win 67% of the vote against five challengers. In hopes of unseating Singer, the organization had run a youthful candidate. They also unsuccessfully did the same thing in the redrawn 44th ward, in hopes of regaining that seat. However, instead, Dick Simpson won that seat.

== 1975 mayoral campaign ==
Forgoing seeking another term on the Chicago City Council, in 1975, Singer unsuccessfully ran in the Democratic Party primary for mayor against Richard J. Daley. If elected mayor, Singer would have been the city's first Jewish mayor. Rahm Emanuel wound up being the city's first Jewish mayor.

Singer ran on a "reform" platform and campaigned heartily for sixteen months, having announced his campaign in October 1973, which was considered a quite early announcement. He raised and spent between $600,000 and $700,000 on his campaign, and had a large grassroots organization with 2,300 precinct level volunteers. Singer primary base of support from the affluent lakefront and from Hyde Park, areas that were home to the lakefront liberals.

Singer received the endorsement of Ralph Metcalfe, the city's most prominent Black politician. Metcalfe had considered running himself, even raising some funds for a potential candidacy before declining to run. Metcalfe, a one-time ally of Daley, had become critical of what he alleged was racism and brutality in the Chicago Police Department.

Singer focused his campaign on the addressing the poor state of the public schools in the city. Singer pledged that, as mayor, he would visit each and every one of the city's 584 public schools. Singer laid blame on Daley for the loss of 200,000 jobs in the city, and pledged that as mayor he would bring jobs back to the city. In 2017, historian Gordon K. Mantler opined that with much of the media's coverage analyzing the "horserace" between candidates, rather than focusing on specific policies, disadvantaged Singer, depriving him of coverage of the reform platform he was running on.

Singer was joined in challenging Daley in the Democratic primary by two other candidates. One was State Senator Richard H. Newhouse Jr. Newhouse was the first Black person to run as a candidate for mayor of Chicago. The other was Cook County State's Attorney Edward Hanrahan.

Daley handily prevailed to capture renomination, winning 57.8%. Singer placed second with only 29.3% of the vote Singer underperformed in his geographic base area. Despite the expectation that the independent voters in lakefront area would vote heavily for Singer out of to distaste for scandals plaguing Daley's mayoral administration, Singer actually very narrowly trailed in the six lakefront ward 46.5% to 46.4%. Singer placed second in the city's ten black-majority wards, with Daley receiving 47%, Singer receiving 31.%, and Newhouse receiving 19.9% in those wards.

== Subsequent career ==
Singer would, for many years, frequently be speculated as a candidate for other public offices, but always opted against running. There had been significant calls from supporters of Singer for him to run for mayor again after Daley's death in office, however Singer did not challenge the machine-backed successor to Daley, Michael A. Bilandic, in the 1977 or 1979 elections. After Jane Byrne beat Bilandic in the 1979 election, Singer served as an advisor on the transition team of mayor-elect Byrne. When Mayor Byrne, who had campaigned as a reformer, partnered with members of the political establishment, Singer jumped to defend her, saying, "I just view it as dealing with reality, with the fact that you can't change everything overnight".

Singer joined the law firm of Kirkland & Ellis. He became a partner at the firm, where he represented many large corporate clients. By the mid-1980s, Singer had become a sort of power broker, with the Chicago Tribune's Paul Galloway writing that he had gone from an "outsider at City Hall to a well-connected insider who has considerable clout on a number of issues". Singer had also formed an allegiance with the still-serving City Council member Edward Vrdolyak, who had been an opponent of Singer and his fellow independent liberal wing of the City Council in the 1970s. He worked with Vrdolyak on authoring ordinances, including a bill which required residential smoke detectors and Chicago's municipal guidelines regulating cable television. Singer was accused of potentially having a conflict of interest regarding the smoke detector ordinance, since he represented a smoke detector manufacturer as a lawyer. The cable television regulations earned praise.

Some of Singer's former independent allies on the City Council expressed dismay that he had come to partner with Vrdolyak instead of Mayor Harold Washington. In 1985, James Chapmen, state chairman of the Independent Voters of Illinois-Independent Precinct Organization expressed this sentiment, while still considering Singer a friend. Noted liberal Chicago political consultant Don Rose criticized Singer as, "one of the clearest examples of a sellout". Former independent alderman Leon Despres, however, defended Singer as simply being a liberal who chose to do lucrative legal work. Some liberals criticized Singer for his endorsement of Jane Byrne instead of Harold Washington in the 1983 Chicago mayoral election. Byrne was also challenged by Richard J. Daley's son Richard M. Daley, who Singer made indirect criticisms of at a campaign rally. In 1985, Singer would claim that he had endorsed Byrne as part of a deal to ease the passage of his cable television ordinance. Additionally, after he endorsed Byrne, she appointed Singer as the chairman of the city's Cable Access Corp., which ran local public access television. Additionally, Byrne and Vrdolyak placed Singer as director of a special commission tasked with making recommendations on cable television and distributing franchises for cable television. In the 1984 Cook County State's Attorney election, Singer endorsed the Vrdolyak-supported Richard M. Daley for reelection instead of independent liberal alderman Lawrence Bloom.

Singer considered running in Illinois' 1984 U.S. Senate election against Republican incumbent Charles H. Percy. He sought to build up his relationship with the political machine in order to receive their backing in this election.

In 1989, Singer was appointed by the newly-elected mayor Richard M. Daley to serve on the interim Chicago Board of Education and served as its vice president. In this role, he helped to negotiate a historic contract with the city's teachers that promised to increase teacher wages and bring about reform to the city's school system structure. However, Singer ultimately failed to deliver the teachers the promised three years worth of 7% wage increases.

Singer was put under government surveillance as a target of the investigation into the scheme that led to the convictions of businessmen Stuart Levine and Tony Rezko. However, Singer was ultimately not charged with any wrongdoing. In the 2008 criminal trial of Rezko, Levine testified to having taken secret recordings of conversations with Singer while cooperating with federal investigators.

In 2009, Edward Vrdolyak was convicted for a 2003 real estate scheme involving Smithfield Properties, for whom Singer worked as a lobbyist and consultant. Singer was tied to this matter, having consulted on the deal central to the conviction, and his involvement looked into by federal investigators. However, Singer was never charged with any criminal conduct.

In 2017, Singer agreed to pay a $25,000 fine after he lobbied Mayor Rahm Emanuel by email without registering as a lobbyist.

In the 2024 United States presidential election, Singer gave his support to Democratic presidential nominee Kamala Harris.

Political offices
Preceded by Thomas Rosenberg	Member of the Chicago City Council; 44th Ward; 1969 – 1971	Succeeded by Dick Simpson
Preceded by George B. McCutcheon	Member of the Chicago City Council; 43rd Ward; 1971 – 1975	Succeeded by Martin J. Oberman
