= Marco Domico =

American politician

Marco Domico (November 20, 1917–July 11, 2010) was an American politician.

Born in Chicago, Illinois, Domico went to the Chicago public schools. Domico served in the Illinois House of Representatives from 1975 to 1984 and was a Democrat. He also served on the Cook County Board of Commissioners from 1986 to 1994.
