= Martin J. Oberman =

American government employee

Marty Oberman
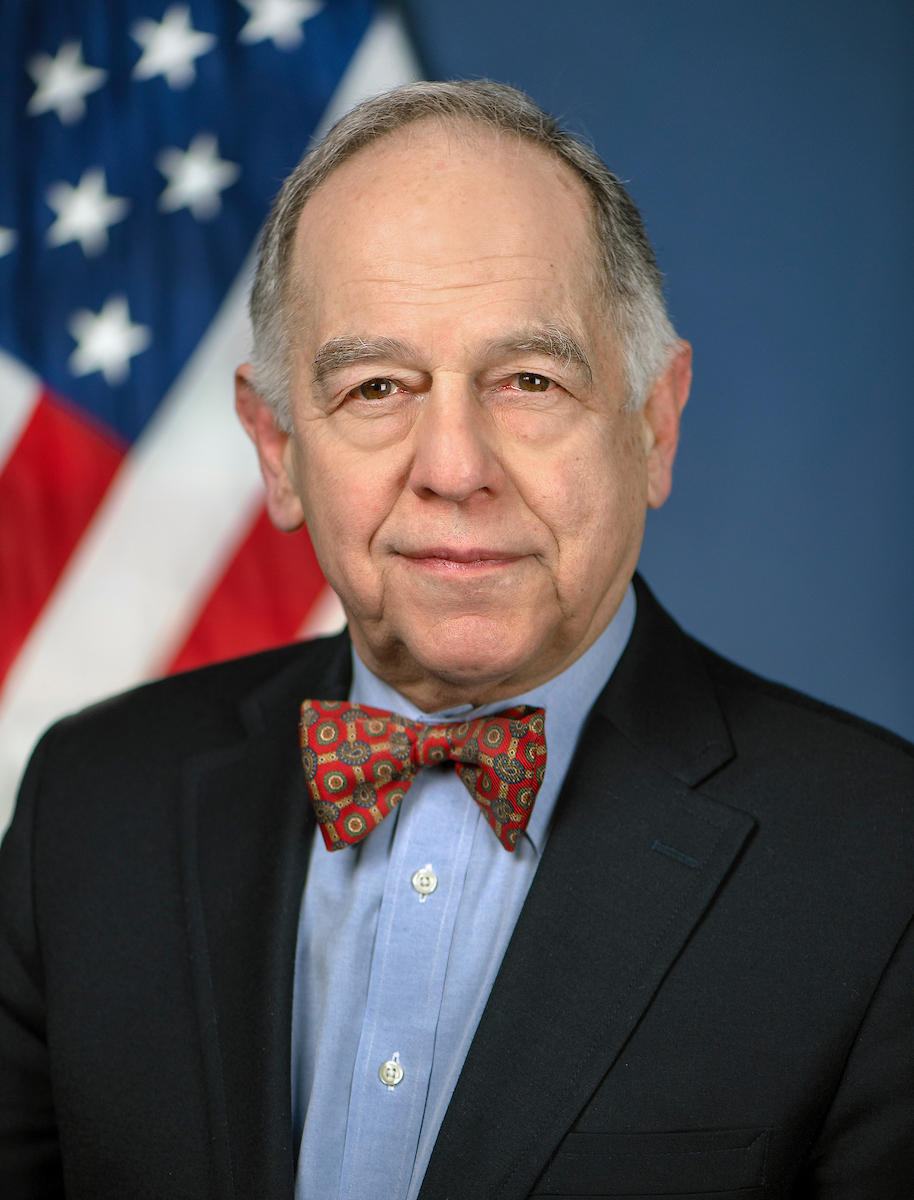
- Official portrait, 2019

Chair of the Surface Transportation Board
- In office January 21, 2021 – May 10, 2024
- President: Joe Biden
- Preceded by: Ann Begeman
- Succeeded by: Robert E. Primus

Vice Chair of the Surface Transportation Board
- In office January 22, 2019 – January 21, 2021
- President: Donald Trump; Joe Biden
- Preceded by: Deb Miller
- Succeeded by: Robert E. Primus

Member of the Surface Transportation Board
- In office January 22, 2019 – May 10, 2024
- President: Donald Trump; Joe Biden
- Preceded by: Daniel R. Elliott III
- Succeeded by: Richard Kloster

Member of the Chicago City Council from the 43rd ward
- In office April 18, 1975 – May 4, 1987
- Preceded by: William Singer
- Succeeded by: Edwin Eisendrath

Personal details
- Born: April 23, 1945 (age 81) Springfield, Illinois, U.S.
- Party: Democratic
- Spouse: Bonnie Oberman
- Children: 2
- Education: Yale University (BA); University of Wisconsin–Madison (JD)

Martin Jay Oberman (April 23, 1945) is an American politician, government official, and attorney who served as a member of the Surface Transportation Board (STB) from 2019 to 2024 and as STB chair from 2021 to 2024. He previously served on the Chicago city council

From 1975 to 1987, Oberman was a member of the Chicago City Council, representing the 43rd Ward. During his tenure, he was known for being against the Daley political machine. He was also one of the few white Council members who supported Mayor Harold Washington during the 1980s Council Wars. He ran unsuccessfully for Illinois Attorney General three times, losing in the 1982, 1986 and 1994 Democratic primaries.

Oberman was the chairman of Metra, the primary commuter rail system in the Chicago metropolitan area, from 2014 until 2016. Appointed by President Donald Trump in 2019, he went on to serve one five-year term on the Surface Transportation Board. During his tenure, he was named chair of the board by President Joe Biden. He retired at the end of his term in 2024.

== Early life and education ==
Oberman's grandfather, Harry W. Oberman (March 25, 1888 – October 2, 1945), was born in Russia and immigrated to the United States in 1906. Harry moved to Springfield, Illinois, where he married Oberman's grandmother Ida Oberman (nee Graonick) on June 20, 1909, and opened a grocery store.

Oberman's father, M. D. "Mush" Oberman, born Morris Davis Oberman, married Oberman's mother, Sophia Oberman (née Friedman), on October 8, 1939. M. D. was active in Springfield community affairs, as well as being a supporter and organizer in the Republican Party. Both Oberman's father and his grandfather were active in their local Jewish community, especially within the B'nai Abraham and B'nai B'rith synagogues.

At the age of 13, Martin Oberman was appointed as a page in the United States House of Representatives. Aside from the Capitol Page School, he attended Springfield's Butler Grade School, Springfield High School, and graduated valedictorian from Culver Military Academy in 1962.

Oberman graduated from Yale University in 1966 with a Bachelor of Arts. During his time at Yale, he was a member of the freshman football team. He then attended the University of Wisconsin Law School, where he was a notes editor for the Wisconsin Law Review. He graduated in 1969 with a Juris Doctor and Order of the Coif honors.

== Public service and politics ==
=== Early work ===
After nearly three years (1969–1972) as a lawyer with the Chicago firm of Leibman, Williams, Bennett, Baird, and Minow, Oberman became General Counsel to the Illinois Racing Board under Anthony Scariano. Oberman investigated and prosecuted various corrupt racing interests in License revocation proceedings for political payoffs, race-fixing and horse drugging.

=== Chicago City Council ===
In 1975, Oberman was elected Alderman from Chicago's 43rd Ward. He had an adversarial relationship with the Chicago City Council's political majority. In 1979 and again in 1983, he was reelected as Alderman.

Oberman was a member of the minority independent bloc of aldermen. He had a reputation as a reformer, and kept himself distanced from the city's Democratic machine politics.

Oberman, along with fellow independent alderman Dick Simpson, was one of only two aldermen to vote against the resolution appointing Michael Anthony Bilandic to hold the mayoralty after Richard J. Daley's death in office.

From 1983 to 1986, Marty supported Mayor Harold Washington, Chicago's first African American mayor in the era of the Council Wars. He had been a supporter of Washington's mayoral candidacy.

=== Subsequent career ===
After leaving the City Council, Oberman was appointed Chairman of the Shore Protection Commission, which was tasked with doing a complete rehabilitation of Chicago's shoreline to ensure environmental protection.

Oberman ran for Illinois Attorney General in 1982 (in which he was not on the ballot), 1986, and again in 1994. He did not win any of these campaigns.

In September 2014, Chicago mayor Rahm Emanuel named Oberman to the board of Metra, Chicago's commuter rail system. He took his seat in November. On February 11, 2014, the board unanimously voted to make him Metra chairman, a position he held until November 1, 2016. His term at Metra was plagued with problems, including late trains and train breakdowns, among other issues.

On July 5, 2018, President Donald Trump announced he was seeking to appoint Oberman to the Democratic vacancy on the United States Surface Transportation Board. He was confirmed for the vacancy on January 3, 2019, by a voice vote in the United States Senate. In January 2019, he began a five-year term on the Surface Transportation Board. In January 2021, he was named Chairman of the Board by President Biden.

In the 2019 Chicago mayoral election, Oberman endorsed Lori Lightfoot, publicly declaring his support of her candidacy in advance of the first round of the election.

== Surface Transportation Board (STB) ==
He was confirmed for the vacancy on January 3, 2019, by a voice vote in the United States Senate. Following Joe Biden's inauguration as president in 2021, Oberman was chosen to serve as chair of the STB.

Oberman retired in May 2024.

== Family life ==
Oberman lives in Chicago with his wife, Bonnie Oberman, who was the Chicago Director of Facing History and Ourselves.

Political offices
| Preceded by William Singer | Member of the Chicago City Council; 43rd Ward; 1975 – 1987 | Succeeded by Edwin Eisendrath |
