= Dick Simpson (politician) =

American professor (born 1940)

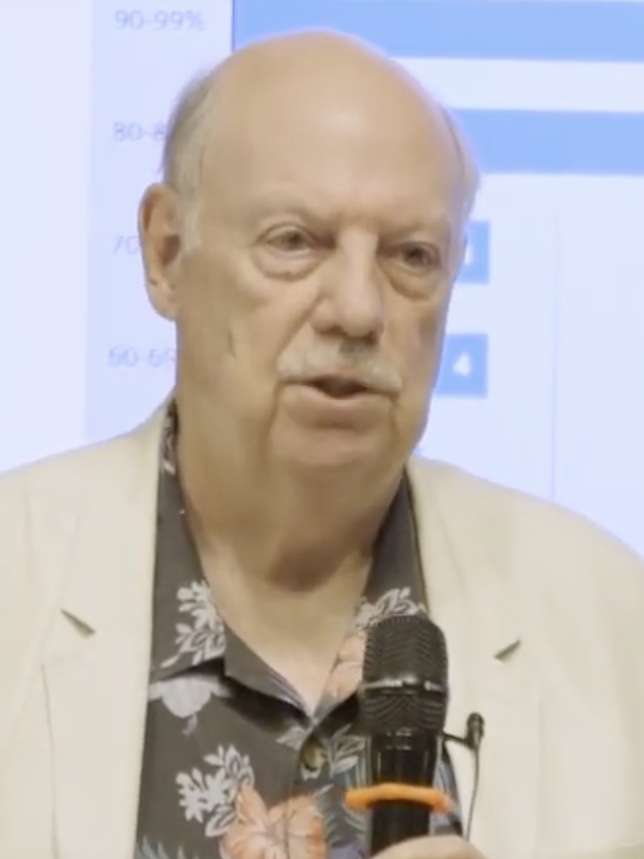
- Simpson in 2019

Chicago Alderman from the 44th Ward
- In office 1971–1979
- Preceded by: William Singer
- Succeeded by: Bruce Young

Personal details
- Born: 1940 (age 85–86) Houston, Texas, U.S.
- Education: University of Texas at Austin; Indiana University (PhD)
- Profession: Professor, author, politician, activist, political consultant, filmmaker

Dick Weldon Simpson (Note: "Dick" is his full first name, not a nickname (as opposed to the common usage of "Dick" as shortened version of "Richard").) (born 1940) is an American professor, author, politician, activist, political consultant, and filmmaker who formerly served as a Chicago alderman from 1971 through 1979. From 1967 until 2022, Simpson was a professor of political science at the University of Illinois at Chicago, and served as the head of the university's political science department from 2006 until 2012.

Simpson is considered to be a progressive. During his time on the Chicago City Council, he was an independent associated with the lakefront liberals. In 1992 and 1994, he unsuccessfully ran for the U.S. House of Representatives as a challenger to incumbent congressman Dan Rostenkowski in the Democratic Party primary for Illinois's 5th congressional district. Simpson has worked as a staffer on political campaigns, and has also worked as a government advisor. Simpson has written an extensive amount of published material on the subject of government and politics.

== Early life ==
Simpson was born in 1940 in Houston, Texas, and grew up as the only child in a middle class household. Simpson participated in the civil rights movement. His activism included being part of a 1960 'stand-in" protest . In 1963, he graduated from the University of Texas. He thereafter attended Indiana University, where he received his PhD. During his studies at Indiana University, he spent some time in Sierra Leone, where he conducted research for his doctoral dissertation. While in Africa, he wrote to his adviser specifically requesting for his assistance in finding a job that would place Simpson in a large city with racial conflict. Simpson desired to live in such a city in order to have the opportunity to contribute to the progressive political transformation of a city.

== Early career ==
Simpson began teaching as a political science professor at the University of Illinois at Chicago (UIC) in 1967. He also quickly began working as a political operative in Illinois. During the 1968 Democratic Party presidential primaries, he initially worked as Eugene McCarthy's campaign manager for Illinois's 9th congressional district. He was promoted to work as the manager of McCarthy's Illinois statewide campaign operation, a role that he held up through the 1968 Democratic National Convention (which took place in Chicago). Simpson participated in the protests that were held in Chicago during the convention.

In 1969, Simpson managed the successful 44th Ward aldermanic campaign of William Singer, a reform-minded and liberal-leaning independent alderman. Singer, a 29-year-old political newcomer, won an upset victory over a candidate supported by the political machine of the city's Democratic Party. Singer's victory was by a very narrow 427 votes in the runoff election against an opponent backed by the Democratic Party organization. Singer's election was seen as ushering in an era of prominence for the city's lakefront liberal voting bloc. Simpson also cofounded the Independent Precinct Organization, and served as the organization's executive director.

== Aldermanic career ==
Simpson served two terms as a Chicago alderman for the 44th Ward, from 1971 through 1979. Simpson has (both during and subsequent to his city council tenure) been considered to be a progressive.

=== Election campaigns ===
Simpson was first elected to the city council in 1971 in an open race. Incumbent 44th ward alderman William Singer was redistricted into the 43rd ward. In the redistricting that took place before the 1971 election, the 44th ward was redrawn to include less of the heavily Jewish and politically independent lakefront, and to include more of the heavily Democratic areas to the west, making it a harder district for Simpson to win as an independent than it had been for Singer to win as an independent. Nevertheless, Simpson defeated the city's Democratic machine to win election to the 44th Ward seat, defeating James B. Kargman. Kragman had the support of the city's Democratic Party organization, as well as the endorsements of some prominent Democratic politicians, such as Adlai Stevenson III and Sidney R. Yates. Kargman was the son of a politically-connected Cook County Circuit Court judge. Simpson was supported by lakefront liberal voters. He ran on a platform that advocated for community control of municipal programs such as urban renewal. Community groups of the 44th ward were in the midst of a dispute with the city over urban renewal at the time of the election. The third candidate originally on the ballot in the 1971 race, Laura C. Keith, withdrew weeks before the election and endorsed Simpson.

Simpson was reelected alderman in 1975, again defeating an opponent supported by the city's Democratic Party organization, Edward Marsalek. Weeks ahead of the election, a third candidate, Wesley Pucinski (the brother of then-41st ward alderman Roman Pucinski) withdrew from the race and endorsed Marsalek. The Committee for an Effective City Council, a group founded to support the election of "independent" candidates to the Chicago City Council, endorsed him and twelve other aldermanic candidates (including fellow incumbents William Cousins, Anna Langford, and John Hoellen) on the same day that Pucinksi withdrew.

=== Tenure ===
As an alderman, Simpson remained a political independent. He was among a handful of liberal alderman on the Chicago City Council. He was an advocate of political reform. He was supported by the lakefront liberals. Throughout his tenure, Simpson remained a professor in political science at the University of Illinois at Chicago.

During his time on the City Council, Simpson was a critic of Richard J. Daley. After he was elected alderman in February 1971, alderman-elect Simpson endorsed Daley's Republican-nominated opponent Richard Friedman in the 1971 Chicago mayoral election (for which the general election was held in April). Despite being nominated by the Republican Party, Friedman was politically a political-reform minded independent Democrat with roots in the Better Government Association, and was similarly endorsed by Jesse Jackson. Daley and Simpson first directly butted heads early into Simpson's tenure as an alderman, when, on July 27, 1971, he questioned Daley's proposed appointment of Thomas Keane Jr, son of Daley's City Council floor leader, alderman Thomas E. Keane, to the city's Zoning Board of Appeals. He questioned the conflict of appointing Keane Jr., vice-president of Arthur Rubloff & Co., one of the city's largest real estate firms. There were other instances where heated arguments erupted between Simpson and Daley. In once instance, Simpson angered Daley so severely that Daley attempted to have the City Council's sergeant at arms force Simpson back into his seat.

Simpson became the leader of the minority bloc of independents on the Chicago City Council. As such, he came into conflict with Michael Bilandic, first during Bilandic's stint as Daley's floor leader on the City Council, and later when Bilandic took office as mayor after Daley's death in office. Simpson and fellow independent alderman Martin J. Oberman were the only two aldermen to vote against the resolution appointing Bilandic to hold the mayoralty on an (initially) interim basis after Daley's death. Like with Daley, he frequently stood in strong opposition to Bilandic during Bilandic's mayoralty.

Being in the minority opposition to mayors Daley and Bilandic, Simpson's proposed legislation were usually defeated. In some instances, the ideas he proposed in legislation were taken by alderman who were aligned with the majority supporting Daley, who then proposed the same ideas in pieces of legislation without Simpson's name attached. One of the few pieces of legislation Simpson managed to pass as an alderman was an ordinance which would prevent banks and insurance companies that do business with the city from practicing redlining. The resolution, which Simpson had feared would have little chance of passing, was passed on June 26, 1974, in a unanimous 44–0 vote after it was amended by Daley-aligned alderman Paul Wigoda. Another piece of legislation that Simpson saw passed was a November 1977 resolution calling for an investigation into figures used the previous summer to justify an 11.7% fare increase to the city's taxis. This came after former city commissioner Jane Byrne alleged a city hall "conspiracy" to raise the rates of taxis. The resolution creating this investigation, proposed by Simpson and fellow independent aldermen Ross Lathrop and Martin J. Oberman, was passed unanimously by the council. The investigation was later ended by a Chicago City Council vote of 40–3 in April 1978 to accept the investigative committee's majority report over the minority report written by Simpson, Lathrop, and Oberman as investigative committee members. While few wholesale pieces of legislation authored by Simpson were passed, Simpson saw occasional success in making amendments to legislation.

Early into his tenure, Simpson and his staff ran an investigation into the practices of the controversial Lincoln Towing Service, which had been a campaign issue during the 1971 aldermanic election. Folk Singer Steve Goodman visited Simpson's office to review documents from this investigation as reference material while writing "Lincoln Park Pirates", a song about the towing company's practices. The council debated taking action against the towing company.

In March 1977, Simpson and fellow aldermen Dennis H. Block, Ross Lathrop, Martin Oberman proposed a piece of legislation that would have established community zoning boards in each of the 50 wards of the city. Simpson established a "ward assembly" for the 44th Ward. This was a form of direct democracy within the ward, which was dismantled after the Democratic machine later regained control of the 44th Ward seat. It was one of Simpson's 1971 campaign promises that he would establish such an assembly if elected alderman. Similarly, some other independent candidates that year had made similar campaign pledges.

In 1978, Milton Rakove, a professor of political science at University of Illinois at Chicago, characterized Simpson's approach to being an alderman as, "an academic idealist at loose in the arena of politics, who cannot and will not make the compromises a true politician must make." Decades after Simpson left the council, journalist and news editor Bruce Dold remarked,

It wasn't that he and other independents could pull off legislative victories. It was that, fortunately, there was a small band of thoughtful people who thrived on standing up to power. They provided what little check there was on the authority of Richard J. Daley. Dick Simpson, Abner Mikva, Bill Singer, Marty Oberman, they were pretty fearless.

=== Retirement from the City Council ===
Simpson opted against seeking reelection in 1979. He endorsed independent candidate Bruce Young, the director of the Jane Addams Center at Hull House, to succeed him. Young pledged, as a candidate, to support existing legislation and ordinances that Simpson had proposed on issues such as redlining, the creation of a code hearing bureau, starting an independent audit of the city's finances, and the establishment of a commission on governmental integrity. Young's opponent was John McCaffrey, who had the backing of the city's Democratic Party. Young won the election, but resigned soon after taking office, citing "personal reasons".

== Post-aldermanic career ==
Following his retirement from the Chicago City Council, Simpson has continued to remain involved in Chicago's political discourse. Bruce Dold has remarked that Simpson, "has remained a trusted [political] critic for decades." Among his activities, he has worked as a political consultant, written about politics, run for United States Congress, and taught politics as an educator. In 2015, Ben Joravsky of the Chicago Reader observed that Simpson has remained a political outsider and continues to assail corruption in Chicago's politics.

=== Professor and political scientist ===
Until retiring in 2022, Simpson continued to teach as a professor at UIC. From 2006 until 2012, Simpson was head of the political science department. He was also a Great Cities Scholar and a Humanities Institute Fellow at UIC and served as director of the university's Preparing Future Faculty Program. In his professorial career, he formerly served as and executive board member of the Illinois Political Science Association, serving for some time as its president. He also worked as co-editor of the Illinois Political Science Review. Simpson participated in annual studies conducted by UIC to measure how independently alderman are voting from the mayor. He was also involved in authoring studies by UIC that ranked cities and states in the United States by their level of corruption. In 2022, Simpson retired as a professor and was named a professor emeritus. Simpson has also been a respected political analyst. He was, for three years, a monthly op-ed columnist for the Chicago Journal, and was subsequently a monthly columnist for the Chicago Sun-Times. Simpson has also been a filmmaker.

=== Work for campaigns and government transitions; endorsements of candidates ===
In 1979, Simpson served as an advisor on the mayoral transition team of Jane Byrne. He also served on the mayoral transition team of Harold Washington in 1983. Simpson was involved in a number of political campaigns in the 1980s, such as the campaign of Ron Sable for Simpson's former 44th Ward aldermanic seat. Simpson endorsed Timothy C. Evans in the 1989 Chicago mayoral special election, and was involved in Woody Bowman's campaign for Illinois Comptroller in 1990. He also worked on both the unsuccessful 1990 Democratic primary election campaign of Ray Smith for Cook County State's Attorney, and the successful general election campaign of Republican nominee Jack O'Malley in the same race. After the 1990 elections, Simpson served on David Orr's transition team for Cook County Clerk as well as Jack O'Malley's transition team for Cook County State's Attorney in 1990.

In the 2000 Illinois Democratic Party presidential primary, Simpson was a candidate to be an alternate delegate for Bill Bradley's campaign contingent on Bradley's performance in the state's presidential primary. Simpson served on Lisa Madigan's transition team for Illinois Attorney General in 2003. In the 2004 United States presidential election, he served first as a member of the Issues Committee of Carol Moseley Braun's campaign, and subsequently as a surrogate for the John Kerry campaign. Simpson supported Chuy García's candidacy in the 2015 Chicago mayoral election. Ahead of the 2019 Chicago mayoral election, Simpson was considered the earliest significant figure to support the campaign Lori Lightfoot . He formally did so on August 21, 2018. He helped then-candidate Lightfoot in writing a proposal for council reform that included putting an end to the practice of aldermanic prerogative and banning outside employment of aldermen. For a long while, Simpson was considered the most prominent individual to have endorsed Lightfoot, still being considered such as late as mid-January 2019 (just over one month a week before Lightfoot would place first the first round of the election). Lightfoot would go on to be elected mayor. After Lightfoot became mayor, Simpson worked to advise her on ethics reform. Simpson voiced his support for Lightfoot's unsuccessful 2023 reelection campaign.

=== 1992 and 1994 congressional campaigns ===
Simpson was twice an unsuccessful candidate for United States congress. Simpson first ran against Dan Rostenkowski in the Democratic primary for the redrawn 5th congressional district in 1992. Posing the greatest reelection challenge Rostenkowski had faced, Simpson won approximately 43% of the vote against Rostenkowski. Rostenkowski, chairman of United States House Committee on Ways and Means, was considered among the nation's most powerful congressmen. Simpson ran on a platform of congressional reform, including support for term limits. His campaign platform also focused on women's rights, universal health care, economic recovery, and senior citizens issues. Simpson also pledged to recreate a version of his 44th ward assembly in the congressional district. During the campaign, he aggressively criticized Rostenkowski. In February 1993, Simpson announced that he would file a formal complaint against Rostenkowski with the Federal Election Commission and the House Ethics Committee urging them to investigate $37,750 in spending by Rostenkowski's American Leaders Fund, alleging Rostenkowski had illegally used funds from this group to aid his reelection campaign.

Simpson again challenged Rostenkowski for the Democratic nomination in 1994. At the time, Rostenkowski was under grand jury investigation, and was also being challenged for the nomination by John Cullerton. Simpson and Cullerton were joined in challenging Rostenkowski by former alderman Michael Wojik and LaRouche movement member John McCarthy. In 1994, Simpson criticized Rostenkowski as corrupt and criticized him for votes such as his vote in support of extending the Hyde Amendment. Simpson placed third behind Rostenkowski and Cullerton. Simpson ran on many of the same issues in 1994 that he had in 1992.

=== Other political involvement ===
In the 1980s, Simpson also ran the organization I CARE (Independent Coalition Against Reagan Economics), which opposed the economic policies of President Ronald Reagan. After Langdon Neale retired from the Chicago Board of Election Commissioners, Simpson applied in December 2015 to fill the seat. His candidacy for the position was endorsed by Danny K. Davis, Mike Quigley, Joe Moore, and David Orr. He was one of seven finalists for the position. Judge Timothy C. Evans, who was in charge of appointing Neale's replacement, ultimately chose to instead appoint Jonathan T. Swain.

In 2021, Simpson participated in an effort run by a coalition of civic groups which formed an independent citizens commission that would draw a city council ward redistricting map, producing an alternative proposal to the ward map that would be drawn-up by members of the Chicago City Council itself as part of the council's decennial redistricting. Simpson was a member of the selection commission that chose the citizens to participate in the effort.

== Electoral history ==
=== Aldermanic ===
1971 Chicago 44th Ward aldermanic election
Candidate	Votes	%
Dick Simpson (incumbent)	8,509	54.27
James B. Kargman	7,171	45.73
Total votes	15,680	100

1975 Chicago 44th Ward aldermanic election
Candidate	Votes	%
Dick Simpson (incumbent)	8,876	52.78
Edward Marsalek	7,941	47.22
Total votes	16,817	100

=== Congressional ===
1992 Illinois's 5th congressional district Democratic primary
Party	Candidate	Votes	%
Democratic	Dan Rostenkowski (redistricted incumbent)	56,059	57.19
Democratic	Dick Simpson	41,956	42.80
Total votes		98,015	100

1994 Illinois's 5th congressional district Democratic primary
Party	Candidate	Votes	%
Democratic	Dan Rostenkowski (incumbent)	46,683	50.06
Democratic	John Cullerton	28,306	30.35
Democratic	Dick Simpson	12,819	13.74
Democratic	Michael A. Wojcik	3,888	4.16
Democratic	John F. McCarthy	1,550	1.66
Total votes		93,246	100

== Bibliography ==
=== Books authored ===
Simpson has been an author or co-author of more than twenty books. These include:

Title	Year published	Other authors	Publisher	Cite
Who Rules?: Introduction to the Study of Politics	1971	—N/a	Penn State University Press	
Winning Elections: A Handbook in Participatory Politics	1972	—N/a	Swallow Press	
Strategies for Change: How to Make the American political Dream Work	1975	George Beam	Swallow Press	
Neighborhood Government in Chicago's 44th Ward	1979	Rick Kohenen and Judy Stevens	Stipes Publishing Co.	
Political Action: Key To Understanding Politics	1984	George Beam	Swallow Press	
The Politics of Compassion and Transformation	1988	—N/a	Swallow Press	
Chicago's Future in a Time of Change	1988	—N/a	Stipes Publishing Co.	
The Crazy Quilt of Government: Units of Government in Cook County	1994	Linda Moll	University of Illinois Press	
Rogues, Rebels, And Rubber Stamps: The Politics of the Chicago City Council from 1863 to the Present	2001	—N/a	Westview Press	
Inside Urban Politics: Voices from America's Cities and Suburbs	2003	—N/a	Pearson/Longman	
The Struggle for Power and Influence in Cities and States	2011	James Dunlap Nowlan, Betty O'Shaughnessy	Longman	
The city, Revisited: Urban Theory from Chicago, Los Angeles, and New York	2011	Dennis R. Judd	University of Minnesota Press	
Twenty-First Century Chicago	2012	—N/a	Cognella Academic Publishing	
African Democracy and Development: Challenges for Post-conflict African Nations	2013	James Dunlap Nowlan, Betty O'Shaughnessy	Longman	
Local Politics and Mayoral Elections in 21st Century America: The Keys to City Hall	2014	Sean D. Foreman, Marcia L. Godwin, Melissa Marschall, Carlos E. Cuéllar, Joseph P. Caiazzo, Melissa Mourtistsen, Betty O'Shaughnessy, William J. Miller, Robert J. Mahu, Lyke Thompson, Fernando J. Guerra, Brianne Gilbert, Larry D. Terry II, Steven P. Erie, Vladimir Kogan, Nazita Lajevardi, Scott A. Mackenzie, P. Frances Gouzien, David C. Kimball	Routledge	
Corrupt Illinois: Patronage, Cronyism, and Criminality	2015	Thomas J. Gradel	University of Illinois Press	
Chicago is Not Broke: Funding the City We Deserve	2016	Thomas Gradel, Jackson Potter, Jamie Kalven, Ron Baiman, Hilary Denk, Amara Enyia, Jonathan Peck	Tom Tresser and CivicLab (Chicago)	
Winning Elections in the 21st Century	2016	Betty O'Shaughnessy	University Press of Kansas	
Teaching Civic Engagement Across the Disciplines	2017	Elizabeth A. Bennion, Elizabeth C. Matto, Alison McCartney	American Political Science Association	
The Good Fight: Life Lessons from a Chicago Progressive	2017	—N/a	Golden Alley Press	
Democracy's Rebirth: The View from Chicago	2022	—N/a	University of Illinois Press	
Chicago's Modern Mayors: From Harold Washington to Lori Lightfoot	2024	co-edited by Betty O'Shaughnessy	University of Illinois Press	

=== Articles ===
Simpson has published hundreds of journal articles, magazine articles, opinion pieces, book chapters, and book reviews. Simpson was, for three years, a monthly op-ed columnist for the Chicago Journal, and was subsequently a monthly columnist for the Chicago Sun-Times. He also formerly was co-editor of the Illinois Political Science Review.

==== Journal articles ====
Journal articles
Article title	Date/year published	Journal (volume, issue)	DOI	Notes
The Future of Chicago: A Blueprint for Political Change		Focus/Midwest (vol. 11, issue 73)		
Neighborhood Empowerment and Urban Management in the 1980s	1983	Journal of Urban Affairs (vol. 5, issue 3)	10.1111/j.1467-9906.1983.tb00033.x	co-authored by Eric S. Moskowitz
Neighborhood Empowerment and Urban Management in the 1980s	1983	Journal of Urban Affairs (vol. 5, issue 3)	10.1111/j.1467-9906.1983.tb00033.x	co-authored by Eric S. Moskowitz
Council Coalitions and Mayoral Regimes in Chicago	1999	Journal of Urban Affairs (vol. 21, issue 1)	10.1111/0735-2166.00004	co-authored by Tom Carsey
Campaign Contributions and Mayoral/Aldermanic Relationships: Building on Krebs and Pelissero	September 2001	Urban Affairs Review (vol. 37, issue 1)	10.1177/10780870122185208	Co-authored by Sean Hogan
Chicago's Uncertain Future Since September 11, 2001	September 2002	Urban Affairs Review (vol. 38, issue 1)	/10.1177/107808702401097835	co-authored by Ola Adeoye, Ruben Feliciano, and Rick Howard
Forty Years of the Civil Rights Movement in Chicago	June 1, 2006	Poverty & Race (vol. 15, issue 3)		
Twiley W. Barker, 83, professor emeritus of political science at the University of Illinois at Chicago, died July 13, 2009	October 2009	PS – Political Science & Politics (vol. 42, issue 4)	10.1017/S1049096509990333	"In memoriam" co-authored by Richard Johnson and Kevin Lyles
Frank Tachau	April 2011	PS – Political Science & Politics (vol. 44, issue 2)	10.1017/S1049096511000394	"In memoriam" co-authored by Richard Johnson and Sultan Tepe

==== Book reviews ====
Book reviews
Article title	Date/year published	Journal (volume, issue)	DOI	Notes
Small and Large Together: Governing the Metropolis. By Howard W. Hallman. (Beverly Hills, Calif.: Sage Library of Social Research, Vol. 56, 1977. Pp. 288. $14.00, cloth; $6.95, paper.)	September 1979	American Political Science Review (vol. 73, issue 3)	10.2307/1955436	
The New Citizenship: Unconventional Politics, Activism, and Service. By Craig Rimmerman. Boulder, CO: Westview Press, 1997. 154p. $45.00 cloth, $15.95 paper.	December 1997	American Political Science Review (vol. 91, issue 4)	10.2307/2952216	
Metropolitics: A Regional Agenda for Community and Stability	Winter 1998	Perspectives on Political Science (vol. 27, issue 1)		
The American Mayor: The Best and Worst Big-City Leaders	Winter 2000	Perspectives on Political Science (vol. 29, issue 1)		
When Corporations Leave Town: The Costs and Benefits of Metropolitan Job Sprawl	Spring 2001	Perspectives on Political Science (vol. 30, issue 2)		
Race, Neighborhoods, and Community Power: Buffalo Politics, 1934-1997; Kraus, Neil Simpson, Dick.	Fall 2001	Perspectives on Political Science (vol. 30, issue 4)	10.1177/0094306115579191t	
Book Review: Political Branding in Cities: The Decline of Politics in Bogota, Naples, and Chicago, by Eleonora Pasotti. Cambridge, UK: Cambridge University Press, 2010. 304 pp. $90.00 (cloth)	2011	Urban Affairs Review (vol. 47, issue 3)	10.1177/1078087410378847	
The Art of the Watchdog: Fighting Fraud, Waste, Abuse, and Corruption in Government by Daniel L. Feldman and David R. Eichenthal. Albany, State University of New York Press, 2014. 353 pp. $29.95.	Fall 2014	Political Science Quarterly (vol. 129, issue 3)	10.1002/polq.12244	
New York and Los Angeles: The Uncertain Future, edited by David Halle and Andrew A. Beveridge. New York: Oxford University Press, 2013. 590 pp. $34.95 paper. ISBN 9780199778379.	May 2015	Contemporary Sociology (vol. 44, issue 3)	10.1177/0094306115579191t	

==== Other academic work ====
Other academic work
Article title	Date published	Publisher	DOI	Notes
The Political Evolution of Two African Towns	1968	Indiana University		Doctoral dissertation
The New Daley machine: 1989 – 2004	July 2004	University of Illinois at Chicago Department of Political Science		Co-authored by Ola Adeoye, Daniel Bliss, Kevin Navratil, Rebecca Raines
Chicago City Council's Newly Found Independence Chicago City Council Report May 7, 2003 – December 7, 2005	January 15, 2006	University of Illinois at Chicago Department of Political Science and the Great Cities Institute		Co-authored by Elias Cepeda, Socrates Harisiadis, Sharmeen Hussain, Sumaira Hussain, Kevin Navratil, James Renzetti, Tom Sdralis
From Daley to Daley: Chicago Politics 1955 - 2006 Dick Simpson	May 2006	Great Cities Institute		Working paper
Chicago's City Council's Increasing Independence: Chicago City Council Report May 7, 2003 – November 15, 2006	December 27, 2006	University of Illinois at Chicago Department of Political Science		Co-authored by Tom Kelly
The Independent Caucus: Breaking the Rubber Stamp Mold: Chicago City Council Report May 21, 2007 – May 13, 2008	May 13, 2008	University of Illinois at Chicago Department of Political Science and Developing Government Accountability to the People		Co-authored by Tom Kelly and Pasquale Neri
Curing Corruption in Illinois: Anti-Corruption Report Number 1	February 3, 2009	University of Illinois at Chicago Department of Political Science		Co-authored by Thomas J. Gradel, Andris Zimelis with Kirsten Byers, and Chris Olson
The Depth of Corruption in Illinois: Anti-Corruption Report #2	May 13, 2009	University of Illinois at Chicago Department of Political Science		Co-authored by Thomas J. Gradel and Andris Zimelis with ith Kirsten Byers, David Michelberger, Chris Olson, and Nirav Sanghani
Cook County Wars Cook County Board of Commissioners Report February 23, 2007 – December 1, 2009	December 15, 2009	University of Illinois at Chicago Department of Political Science		Co-authored by Tom Kelly
Teaching Political Engagement	2010	American Political Science Association	10.2139/ssrn.1546557	
Afterword: The Future of Sierra Leone	2010	Palgrave Macmillan	10.1057/9780230111530_11	Afterward of the book Sierra Leone Beyond the Lomé Peace Accord
Corruption in Cook County: Anti-Corruption Report #3	February 18, 2010	University of Illinois at Chicago Department of Political Science and the Better Government Association		Co-authored by Thomas J. Gradel and Tom Kelly with Kenneth Chow, Alexandra Kathryn Curatolo, Emily Gillot, David Michelberger, Marrell Stewart, and Andris Zimelis
Patronage, Cronyism and Criminality in Chicago Government Agencies: Anti-Corruption Report #4	February 2011	University of Illinois at Chicago Department of Political Science		Co-authored by Thomas J. Gradel with Erica Adams, Alex Jakubowich, Mark Lund, Inna Rubin, Cori Smith, Salwa Shameem, Paris Tsangaris, and Melissa Mouritsen Zmuda
The Last of the Daley Years Chicago City Council Voting Report #5 May 21, 2007 – January 13, 2011	March 2011	University of Illinois at Chicago Department of Political Science		Co-authored by Thomas J. Gradel, Tom Kelly, James Nell, Cori Smith, and Missy Mouritsen Zmuda
Chicago and Illinois, Leading the Pack in Corruption: Anti-Corruption Report #5	February 15, 2012 (updated April 18, 2012)	University of Illinois at Chicago Department of Political Science and the Illinois Integrity Initiative of the University of Illinois' Institute for Government and Public Affairs		Co-authored by Douglas Cantor, Thomas J. Gradel, Melissa Mouritsen, James Nowlan, and Zmuda David Sterrett
Green Grass and Graft: Corruption in the Suburbs: Anti-Corruption Report #6	June 22, 2012	University of Illinois at Chicago Department of Political Science		Co-authored by Thomas J. Gradel, David Sterrett, Melissa Mouritsen Zmuda with Doug Cantor, Emily Marr, Mike Ramirez, Ely Sarmiento, and Nick Yodelis
Crime, Corruption and Cover-ups in the Chicago Police Department: Anti-Corruption Report Number 7	January 17, 2013	University of Illinois at Chicago Department of Political Science		Co-authored by Thomas J. Gradel, John Hagedorn, Bart Kmiecik, David Sterrett, Melissa Mouritsen Zmuda with Tricia Chebat, Justin Escamilla, Dalibor Jurisic, Magdalena Waluszko, and Ivana Savic
Continuing The Rubber Stamp City Council: Chicago City Council Report #6 June 8, 2011 - February 13, 2013	April 8, 2013	University of Illinois at Chicago Department of Political Science		Co-authored by Melissa Mouritsen Zmuda
The Cook County Board in the Preckwinkle Era Cook County Board of Commissioners Report December 16, 2010 – April 16, 2014	June 3, 2014	University of Illinois at Chicago Department of Political Science		Co-authored by Thomas J. Gradel, Kelly McKevitt, and Melissa Mouritsen Zmuda
Rahm Emanuel's Rubber Stamp City Council: Chicago City Council Report #7 June 8, 2011- November 15, 2014	December 9, 2014	University of Illinois at Chicago Department of Political Science		Co-authored by Beyza Buyuker and Melissa Mouritsen
Chicago, Still the Capital of Corruption: Anti-Corruption Report #8	May 28, 2015	University of Illinois at Chicago Department of Political Science		Co-authored by Thomas J. Gradel, John Johnson, and Melissa Mouritsen
2015: A Banner Year in Illinois Corruption: Anti-Corruption Report #9	March 10, 2016	University of Illinois at Chicago Department of Political Science		Co-authored by Thomas J. Gradel, Ion Nimerencu, and Leslie Price
A More Active City Council: Chicago City Council Report #8 June 17, 2015 – April 13, 2016	May 23, 2016	University of Illinois at Chicago Department of Political Science		Co-authored by Maria Estrada, Thomas J. Gradel, Ion Nimerencu, and Catie Sherman
DuPage County Board Voting Analysis December 14, 2014 – December 12, 2017	February 28, 2017	College of DuPage and University of Illinois at Chicago Departments of Political Science		Co-authored by Thomas J. Gradel and Melissa Mouritsen with Sergio Bauza, Marissa Frank, Gabrielle Lassen, Jake Rouka, Sarlota Vitolyte and Jennifer Wade
Chicago's Evolving City Council Chicago City Council Report #9 June 17, 2015 – March 29, 2017	May 17, 2017	University of Illinois at Chicago Department of Political Science		Co-authored by Thomas J. Gradel, Maureen Heffern, and Ponicki Allyson Nolde
The Cook County Board During President Preckwinkle's Second Term Cook County Board of Commissioners Report December 2014 – December 2017	January 25, 2018	University of Illinois at Chicago Department of Political Science		Co-authored by Thomas J. Gradel and Zahra Keshwani
Continuing Corruption in Illinois: Anti-Corruption Report #10	May 15, 2018	University of Illinois at Chicago Department of Political Science		Co-authored by Thomas J. Gradel, Marco Rosaire Rossi, and Katherine Taylor
Chicago City Council and The Mayor: Big Questions on the Threshold to Change: Chicago City Council Report #10 April 19, 2017 – November 14, 2018	December 12, 2018	University of Illinois at Chicago Department of Political Science		Co-authored by Thomas J. Gradel and Marco Rosaire Rossi
Corruption in Chicago and Illinois: Anti-Corruption Report #11	February 11, 2019	University of Illinois at Chicago Department of Political Science		Co-authored by Thomas J. Gradel and Marco Rosaire Rossi
Chicago Still the Corruption Capital: Anti-Corruption Report #12	February 17, 2020	University of Illinois at Chicago Department of Political Science		Co-authored by Michael Dirksen, Thomas J. Gradel, and Marco Rosaire Rossi
From Rubber Stamp to a Divided City Council: Chicago City Council Report #11 June 12, 2019 – April 24, 2020	April 28, 2020	University of Illinois at Chicago Department of Political Science		Co-authored by Thomas J. Gradel and Marco Rosaire Rossi
More Blue More Female More Bipartisan: DuPage County Board Voting Analysis #2 December 13, 2016 – September 8, 2020	October 23, 2020	College of DuPage and University of Illinois Departments of Political Science		Primary author was Melissa Mouritsen; co-authored with Simpson, Thomas J. Gradel, Leslie Price, Muhammad Abuarqoub, Abdi Ali, Mariano Ballines, Nick Beausoleil, Bilal Hannoun, Lum Haxhiu, Lina Househ, Julie Hughes, Jeffrey Knutson, Ryan Kuhlmann, Michael Kwasnik, Michael Magel, Daniel Nichols, William Parrilli, Carinne Risch, and Jaime Zavala
Corruption Spikes in Illinois: Anti-Corruption Report #13	February 22, 2021	University of Illinois at Chicago Department of Political Science		Co-authored by Thomas J. Gradel and Marco Rosaire Rossi
Emanuel and Lightfoot City Councils: Chicago City Council Report #12 June 12, 2019 – May 18, 2021	May 18, 2021	University of Illinois at Chicago Department of Political Science		Co-authored by Thomas J. Gradel and Marco Rosaire Rossi
Corruption Continues Through the Covid-19 Pandemic: Anti-Corruption Report #14	May 7, 2022	University of Illinois at Chicago Department of Political Science		Co-authored by Thomas J. Gradel and Marco Rosaire Rossi
City Council Buries its Rubber Stamp: Chicago City Council Report #13 June 12, 2019 – March 23, 2022	June 7, 2022	University of Illinois at Chicago Department of Political Science		Co-authored by Thomas J. Gradel and Marco Rosaire Rossi

==== Opinion and commentary articles ====
Opinion and commentary articles
Article title	Date published	Publication	Notes
Don't let digital campaign tools undermine democracy	August 10, 2016	Chicago Sun-Times	Co-authored by Betty O'Shaughnessy
Support for Trump will fade when people feel the pinch	January 24, 2017	Chicago Sun-Times	
The legacy of Harold Washington 30 years after his sudden death	November 24, 2017	Chicago Sun-Times	
Chicago voters, do you want change — or more of the same?	March 18, 2018	Chicago Tribune	
Schock: Possibly illegal, probably unethical and definitely Illinois	September 5, 2018	Crain's Chicago Business	
Ald. Ed Burke corruption charge is a challenge to voters: Elect a better City Council	January 4, 2019	Chicago Tribune	
Is the Chicago machine 'dead, dead, dead'? Don't plan the funeral yet.	May 31, 2019	Chicago Tribune	
Four big moments in politics coming to Chicago and Illinois in 2020	December 30, 2019	Chicago Sun-Times	
Chicago's still the nation's corruption capital — and Blagojevich is the poster boy	February 27, 2020	Chicago Sun-Times	Co-authored by Tom Gradel
Is that democracy in Chicago's City Council? What a welcome change.	April 28, 2020	Chicago Tribune	
Chicago's next ward map can change a neighborhood's fate. Let the people draw the lines.	April 5, 2021	Chicago Tribune	Co-authored by Chris Kanich and Kathleen Yang-Clayton
Mayor Lori Lightfoot and the City Council — finally, a taste of democracy in Chicago	May 19, 2021	Chicago Tribune	
Youth rally in the midterms to carry on the fight for democracy	December 7, 2022	Chicago Tribune	
Youth rally in the midterms to carry on the fight for democracy	December 7, 2022	Chicago Tribune	
It's good for the city to 'Bring Chicago Home' and help those who are homeless	February 19, 2024	Chicago Sun-Times	

=== Other written work ===
- Letter written to Derek Shearer on May 7, 1975 providing descriptions of several experimental political ordinances undertaken in Chicago since 1971
- Compilation of Chicago aldermanic voting records on key issues (2000–2002) – compiled by Simpson, Ruben Feliciano, Rick Howard, and Aaron Van Klyton (University of Illinois at Chicago Political Science Department)
- The Crisis in American Democracy: webinar & civics toolkit, 2022 (American Political Science Association)
