= The Chinese in Latin America and the Caribbean =

2010 book

- Editor: Walton Look Lai, Tan Chee-Beng
- Genre: Non-fiction
- Publisher: Brill Publishing
- Publication date: 2010

The Chinese in Latin America and the Caribbean is a 2010 book edited by Walton Look Lai and Tan Chee-Beng and published by Brill.

The essays in the book were previously published as a portion of an issue of the Journal of Overseas Chinese, a publication of the International Society for the Study of Chinese Overseas (ISSCO) of Singapore. Look Lai is a University of the West Indies (UWI) professor who specialized in studying the British Caribbean population of Chinese and Southeast Asians. Tan, a Hong Kong–based man who is the editor of the Journal of Overseas Chinese, is a specialist in studying the Southeast Asian ethnic Chinese populations.

== Contents ==
Look Lai wrote the introduction.

The remaining portion of the book has three parts, which together have eight chapters. The Chinese immigration discussed in these chapters include those from the early colonial era to the present.

The sole article of Part I is "The Early Colonial Period" by Edward Slack, Jr. This article discusses the first Chinese immigration to Mexico. The source material of this chapter originates from the General Archive of the Indies in Seville, Spain and the Archivo General de la Nación in Mexico City. John Kuo Wei Tchen of New York University wrote that the Slack article "is a valuable baseline framing of the early Manila-Acapulco “China trade,” the Asian peoples moving to colonial Mexico, and the emergence of the New World typology of “chino” or “indio chino,” a legal subcategory of the “indios” of the Americas."

Part II, "The Classic Migration," includes Chapters 2–5. Chapter 2, written by Look Lai, discusses overall migration from Asia during the 19th Century. Chapter 3, written by Evelyn Hu-Dehart, discusses anti-Chinese sentiment in Latin America. Hu-Dehart's essay examines a question asked by Nicolás Cárdenas García, a scholar from Mexico, on whether the Chinese in Latin America are "integrated and foreign." Chapter 4, written by Belizean St. John Robinson, is a comparative analysis which discusses Chinese populations of Central America. Chapter 5, written by Lisa Yun, is an interview with Ruthanne Lum discussing Lum's book, God of Luck. Dorothea A. L. Martin of Appalachian State University stated that the first two chapters of this section are "the anchors of the work".

Part III, "Old Migrants, new Immigration," includes Chapters 6-8. The overall focus are relations between different generations of immigrants in Latin America. Chapter 6, by Isabelle Lausent-Herrera, discusses the history and internal relations of Chinese Peruvians. Chapter 7, written by anthropologist Paul B. Tjon Sie Fat, discusses the groups of Chinese Surinamese and their responses to anti-Chinese sentiment. Chapter 8, by Kathleen Lopez, discusses Chinese Cubans in the post-Soviet Union era. The article discusses a PRC-Cuba initiative to renovate the Havana Chinatown.
