= For Freedom's Sake =

1999 book by Chana Kai Lee

For Freedom's Sake: The Life of Fannie Lou Hamer is a non-fiction book by Chana Kai Lee, published in 1999 by University of Illinois Press.

Publishers Weekly stated that the work's main focus was aspects of the Civil Rights Movement in the beginning stages and Hamer's development of her activism, instead of being a general biography of Hamer.

Evelyn Hu-DeHart stated that the book puts emphasis on her conflicts with people of higher socioeconomic classes, which made Hamer focus on issues relating to the necessity of gaining financial freedom as opposed to political freedom, as well as on Hamer's political alliance with white left-leaning feminists and the ideological conflicts with said feminists.

== Reception ==
Hu-Dehart argued that the author should have sought to have used a new definition of feminism instead of using "conventional, white, liberal feminist definitions".

Linda Reed of the University of Houston argued that since the book did not fully explain certain contradictions and did not develop some portions enough, the book therefore "cannot be labeled "the definitive biography," as the book's dust jacket claims."

Selika Ducksworth Lawton praised the "extensive research" and stated that the work "is an excellent analysis of Hamer's life and work." Lawton argued that since Lee had not had extensive experience with life in the rural United States, that Lee misinterpreted some of Hamer's biography.
