= Marion Orr (political scientist) =

American political scientist

Marion E. Orr
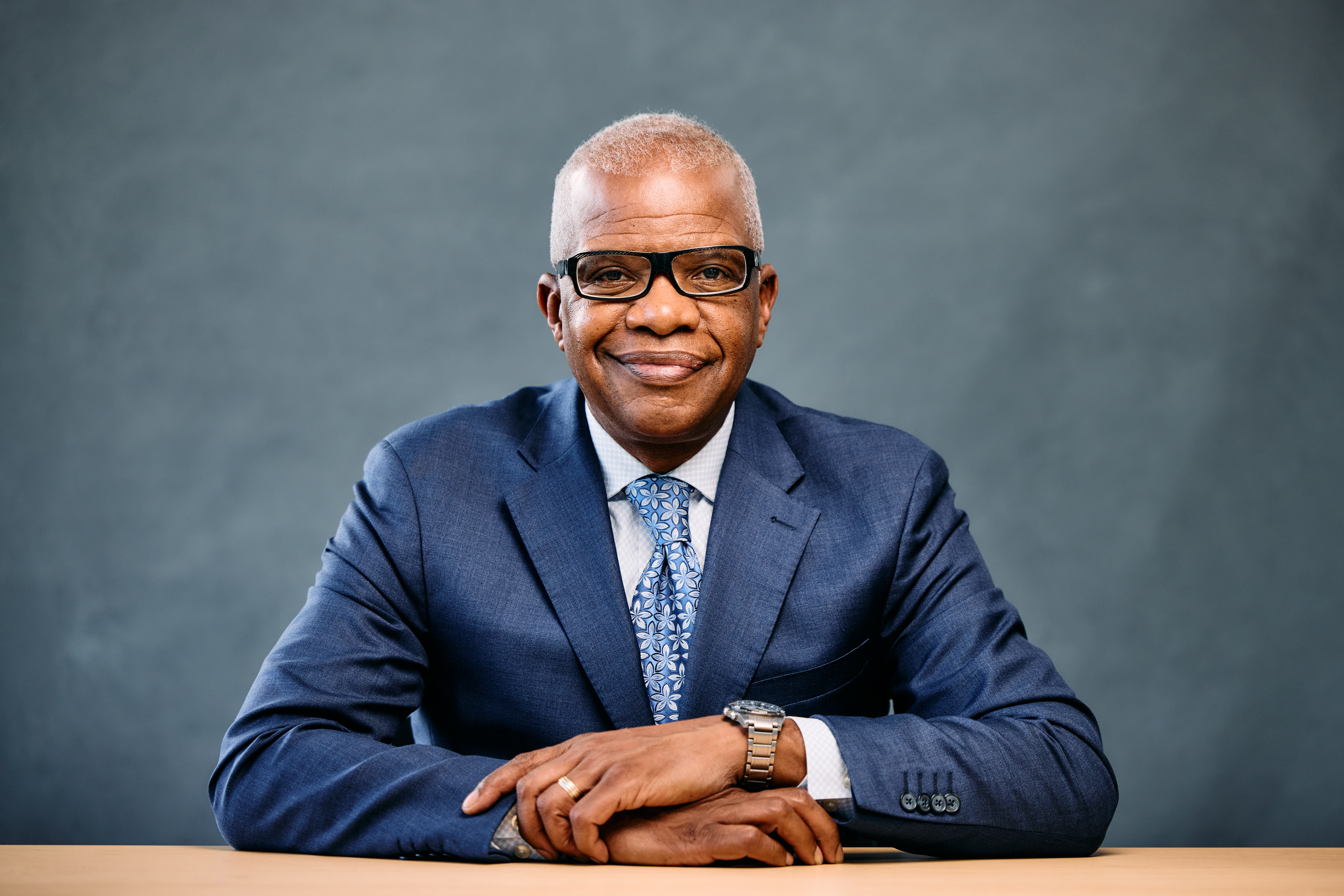
- Education: Savannah State College; Atlanta University; University of Maryland
- Known for: House of Diggs: The Rise and Fall of America's Most Consequential Black Congressman; Charles C. Diggs Jr. (University of North Carolina Press, 2025), Black Social Capital: The Politics of School Reform in Baltimore (University Press of Kansas, 1999); The Color of School Reform: Race, Politics, and the Challenge of Urban Education (Princeton University Press, 1999)
- Awards: Hanes Walton Jr. Award; APSA
- Scientific career
- Fields: Political science; African-American studies; Public policy; Urban studies; Latino studies
- Workplaces: University of California, Berkeley; Duke University; Brown University

Marion E. Orr is an American political scientist, currently the Frederick Lippitt Professor of Public Policy and a professor of political science and urban studies at Brown University. Orr specializes in education reform in the United States, urban politics, Latino politics, and African-American politics.

== Education and early career ==
Orr received his undergraduate education from Savannah State College, earning a BA in political science in 1984. He then studied political science at Atlanta University, earning an MA in political science in 1987, followed by a PhD in government and politics at the University of Maryland in 1992. In 1992 Orr became a Presidential Postdoctoral Fellow at the University of California, Berkeley, and in 1993 he joined the faculty at Duke University. He moved to Brown University in 1999.

== Career ==
Orr has been an author or editor of eight books. He was the author of the 1999 book Black Social Capital: The Politics of School Reform in Baltimore, 1986-1998. In Black Social Capital, Orr applies the theory of social capital to the topic of education reform in the United States, using the city of Baltimore as the basis for a case study, and relying on extensive interviews and fieldwork as well as published materials. In a review for the American Political Science Review, John Portz wrote that in Black Social Capital "Orr analyzes the social and political dynamics that stymied or supported major school reform in Baltimore", which constituted "an important contribution to urban studies as well as the general political science literature", including advancing the theory of social capital itself. Black Social Capital won the Policy Studies Organization's Aaron Wildavsky Award for the best book published in 1999. In 2022, Orr was awarded the Biographers International Organization’s Francis “Frank” Rollin Fellowship for his work on Congressman Charles C. Diggs, Jr. Orr is the author of the first biography of Congressman Diggs: House of Diggs: The Rise and Fall of America's Most Consequential Black Congressman, Charles C. Diggs Jr., released in September 2025.

Several of Orr's other works have received major awards. His co-authored book The Color of School Reform: Race, Politics and the Challenge of Urban Education received the Best Book Award in 2000 from the Urban Politics Section of the American Political Science Association, which is given to the best book published in 2000. He also received the 1995 Rodney Higgins' Best Paper Award for the best paper presented at the National Conference of Black Political Scientists. In 2018, Orr was the commencement speaker at Savannah State University. In 2019, Orr was the recipient of the Hanes Walton Jr. Career Award from the American Political Science Association, which "recognizes a political scientist whose lifetime of distinguished scholarship has made significant contributions to our understanding of racial and ethnic politics and illuminates the conditions under which diversity and intergroup tolerance thrive in democratic societies."

From 2008 until 2014, Orr was the director of the A. Alfred Taubman Center for Public Policy at Brown University. He has also been the chair of the political science department at Brown University, as well as the director of the urban studies program there. Orr has been an editor for major journals like the Urban Affairs Review and the Journal of Urban Affairs.

== Selected works ==
- "Urban Regimes and Leadership in Detroit", Urban Affairs Review, with Gerry Stoker (1994)
- Black Social Capital: The Politics of School Reform in Baltimore, 1986-1998 (1999)
- The Color of School Reform: Race, Politics and the Challenge of Urban Education, with Jeffrey R. Henig, Richard C. Hula, and Desiree S. Pedescleaux (1999)
- Latino Mayors: Political Change in the Postindustrial City, co-edited with Domingo Morel (2018)

== Selected awards ==
- Rodney Higgins Best Paper Award, National Conference of Black Political Scientists (1995)
- Best Book Award, American Political Science Association Urban Politics Section (2000)
- Hanes Walton Jr. Award, American Political Science Association (2019)
