= Marilyn J. Gittell =

American academic and education reformer

- Born: Marilyn Audrey Jacobs; April 3, 1931; Brooklyn, New York, United States
- Died: 2010 (aged 78–79)
- Education: City University of New York; New York University (MPA, PhD)

Marilyn Jacobs Gittell (April 3, 1931 – 2010) was an American scholar and education reformer. She is best known for her role in decentralizing the New York City public school administration, shifting power from the New York City Board of Education to 32 community school boards throughout New York City's five boroughs.

== Early life ==
Born Marilyn Audrey Jacobs in Brooklyn, New York on April 3, 1931, she attended Brooklyn College, City University of New York. She earned a bachelor's degree in political science in 1952. She continued her studies at New York University, where she earned her Masters in Public Administration and her PhD in political science.

== Career ==
Gittell's teaching career spanned six decades and was spent entirely within the City University of New York (CUNY). Gittell began teaching in the department of Political Science at Queens College, CUNY in 1960. She remained in the department until 1971 when she founded the Urban Studies department and became its department chair. During her time at Queens College, Gittell also co-founded the Urban Studies department there and directed the Institute for Community Studies.

In 1973, she became associate provost and assistant vice president of Brooklyn College, CUNY. At the time, she was the highest-ranking woman at the college. She remained at Brooklyn College until 1978 when she joined the Political Science department at the CUNY Graduate Center and directed the Howard Samuels State Management and Policy Center. She served in these capacities until her death in 2010.

Gittell initiated the academic journal, Urban Affairs Review (then Urban Studies Quarterly) in 1965.

A posthumous collection of selected works by Gittell, entitled Activist Scholar, highlights three key themes in her work: education reform and citizen participation, community-based organizations and community organizing, and women's leadership, social capital, and social change. In the 1990s, her research on education reform and community development organizations was supported by grants from the Ford Foundation, the MacArthur Foundation, and the National Science Foundation.

== Conflict at Ocean Hill-Brownsville and New York City teacher's strike of 1968 ==
Marilyn Gittell's research and activism frequently informed one another. Gittell played a critical role in the historical events related to the New York City public school decentralization efforts of the late 1960s and subsequent backlash and community-led efforts (see New York City teachers' strike of 1968 and Ocean Hill, Brooklyn). As founding director of the Institute for Community Studies (ICS) at Queens College and funded through a Ford Foundation grant, Gittell and ICS provided technical guidance and supported a public awareness campaign in support of the demonstration districts selected to pilot decentralized public school leadership and community-led schools. Gittell is cited as a "main architect" of the decentralization effort, which she described in a retrospective interview as "decentralizing power" and an attempt at community control. Gittell's position in support of the demonstration districts placed her into direct conflict with those opposed to school decentralization, most notably the United Federation of Teachers (UFT) and its director Albert Shanker. Shanker and Marcoantonio Lacatena, President, Council of N.J. State College Locals (AFL–CIO) both attacked Gittell publicly, targeting her scholarship. Her co-authored book with Maurice Berube on the conflict, Confrontation at Ocean Hill-Brownsville, has been called a "classic" on the matter.

== Family ==
Gittell and her husband Irwin married in 1950. Irwin died in 2005. They had two children, Ross and Amy.

== Legacy ==
After her death, several awards, fellowships, and a named chair position were established to honor Gittell. The Urban Affairs Association created the Marilyn J. Gittell Activist Scholar Award, which seeks to reward scholars who are directly engaged with impacted communities around a specific policy issue, such as Henry Louis Taylor, Jr. and Nico Calavita. The Graduate Center of the City University of New York memorialized Gittell through the Marilyn J. Gittell Endowed Chair in Urban Studies, currently held by Professor Celina Su, and the Marilyn J. Gittell Postdoctoral and Dissertation Fellowships. In addition, the Marilyn J. Gittell Endowed Chair anchors the Gittell Urban Studies Collective, which seeks to honor Gittell and build on her legacy of participatory research (especially on and in cities), commitment to racial, gender, and economic justice, and promoting collaborative research programs. Her digital archives (representing a selection of her works and papers) now live online at the CUNY New Media Lab, which her paper archives now reside at Queens College.
