= Marion Orr =

Marion Orr may refer to:

- Marion Alice Orr (born 1918), Canadian aviator
- Marion Orr (political scientist), American political scientist
