= List of Black political parties =

This is a list of political parties stating that they represent Black people and Black interests.

== Africa ==
Party
Action for Change
Afro-Shirazi Party
Alliance for Justice and Democracy/Movement for Renewal
Black Bloc
Kush Democratic Majority Party
Mauritanian National Union
Movement for the Social Evolution of Black Africa

== Europe ==
Party
Die Urbane. Eine HipHop Partei

== North America ==
Party
National Democratic Party of Alabama
African People's Socialist Party
Black Panther Party
Black Coffee Party USA
Partido Independiente de Color
United Citizens Party
Progressive Democratic Party
Our Black Party
National Black Independent Party
Vanguard Nationalist and Socialist Party
New Afrikan Independence Party

== South America ==
Party
Black Native Party
Brazilian Black Front

== See also ==
- African nationalism
- Anti-imperialism
- Anti-racism
- Black nationalism
