= Lincoln Towing Service =

Towing company in Chicago

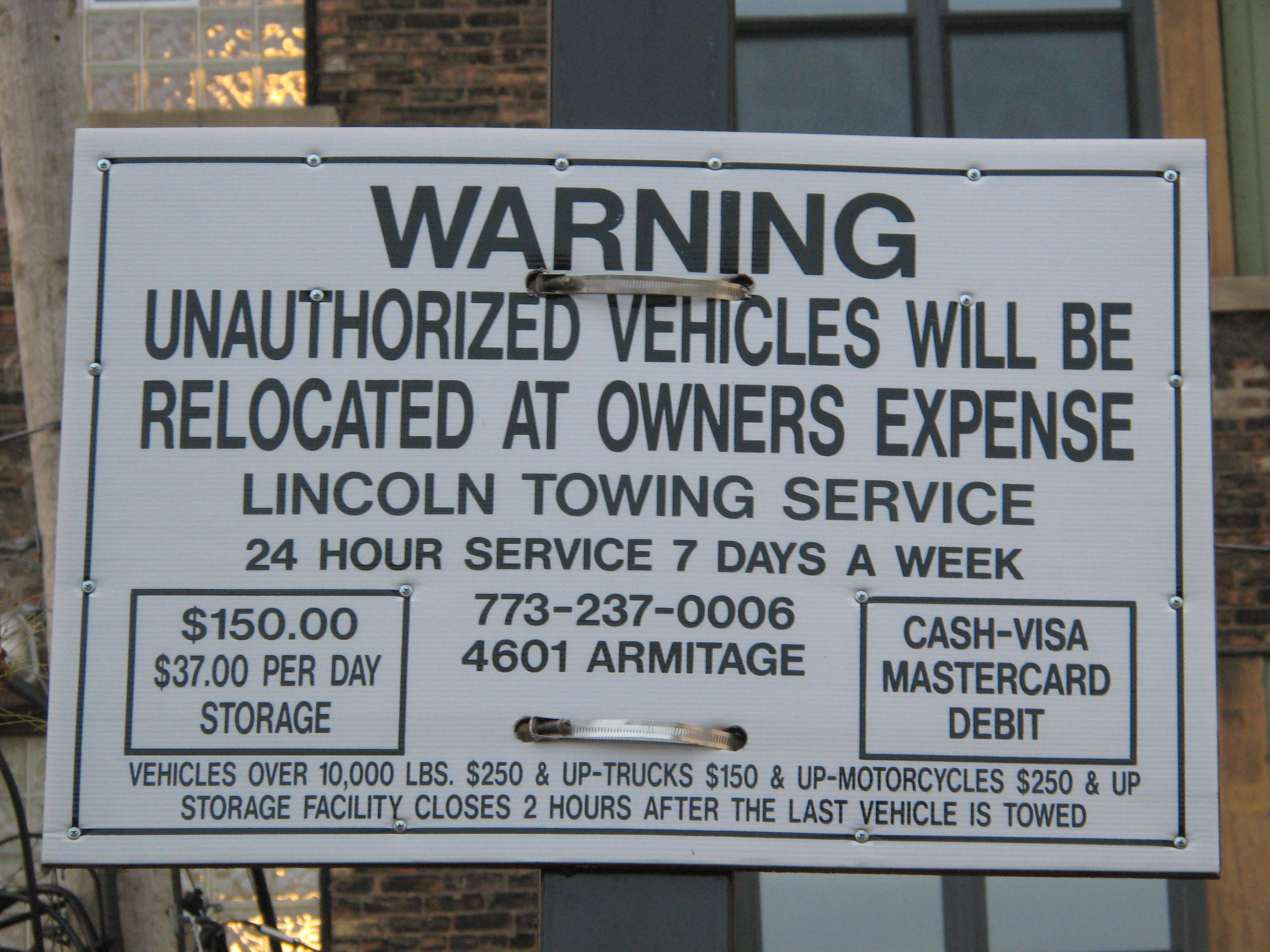
- Lincoln Towing Service sign
- Type: Private
- Industry: Towing
- Headquarters: Chicago, Illinois, United States
- Website: lincolntowing.com

Protective Parking Corporation, doing business as Lincoln Towing Service, is one of the primary towing services in Chicago, Illinois. The primary business location is at 4882 N. Clark Street, in the Uptown community area of Chicago in Cook County, with a second location at 4601 W. Armitage Avenue. The company was founded by Ross Cascio, who sold the company on January 20, 1981. The firm became controversial in the late 1960s and 1970s. At this time, Chicago Daily News columnist Mike Royko published several articles on Cascio's alleged strong-arm tactics. When running for the Chicago City Council, Dick Simpson made the firm a campaign issue, and investigated them after being elected. Additionally, folk singer Steve Goodman wrote a song about the firm, calling them the "Lincoln Park Pirates."

The company describes itself as relocators who protect property owners from illegal parkers on parking lots with contracts for the company's services. Its business is parking enforcement, and the company does not provide roadside assistance. The company, its relocators and its dispatchers are regulated and licensed by the Illinois Commerce Commission. On September 12, 2018, the ICC revoked Lincoln Towing's Illinois relocation towing license. However, a Cook County judge subsequently overruled the ICC's decision, reinstating Lincoln Towing's license.

== Business ==
Lincoln provides relocation services for landlords with tenant parking problems and for commercial property owners with similar problems. The primary business is removing vehicles from parking spaces. The business claims the largest fleet of wheel-lift and flatbed towing vehicles in Chicago. The business model is such that towing companies engage in exclusive towing contracts for properties and collect fees from owners of unauthorized vehicles that have been towed. However, the company also provides vehicle repossession services and parking lot management services which include snow removal, pot hole patching, striping, and complete parking lot construction. As a private company enforcing private property parking, the company does not issue parking tickets in addition to charging for towing and storage, unlike the City of Chicago, which does for parking in tow zones. It has towed over 30,000 parked cars since September 5, 2005, which makes it Chicago's leading relocator.

Towing is a business regulated by the Illinois Commerce Commission and specifically by the Illinois Commercial Relocation of Trespassing Vehicles Law. These laws are found under Chapter 625 of the Illinois Consolidated Statutes at Title 5/Chapter 18A and Chapter 92 of the Illinois Administrative Code: Part 1710. This law regulates the activities of companies that tow unauthorized vehicles from private property in Cook, Will, Kane, DuPage, and Winnebago counties. This law does not affect the towing of cars parked on public streets, companies which provide roadside assistance–related towing, companies involved in repossession, or vehicles towed at the direction of local enforcement authorities.

== Controversies ==
=== 1960s and 1970s ===
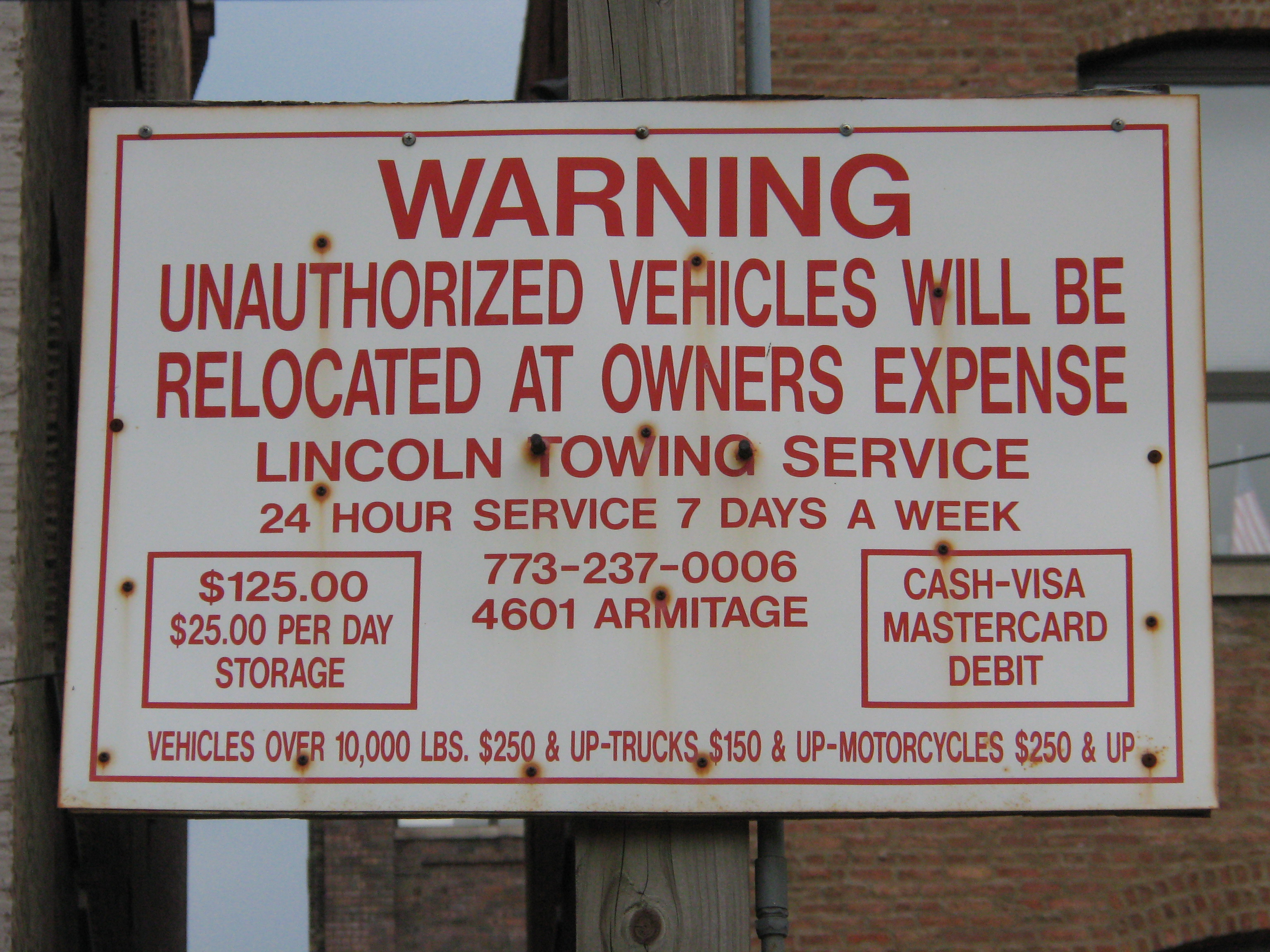
Sign showing prices before June 13, 2007 state-authorized price increases

Starting in 1967, Chicago Daily News columnist Mike Royko wrote a series of articles about Cascio that continued for over a decade. Royko claimed that "to intimidate those who objected, Cascio hung bats, blackjacks, chains and other pacifiers on his office wall. If a person tried to escape with his own car, Cascio's men would dance on his chest." Cascio sued Royko twice, but lost both suits.

As early as 1968, complaints were lodged against Lincoln Towing Service claiming that the company was towing cars without legal standing and threatening people who tried to reclaim automobiles without paying.

In 1971, the company became an issue during the 44th Ward aldermanic race. The victorious candidate, Dick Simpson spoke about it as a candidate, as did his opponent James Kargman. Kargman called for "hit[ting] Cascio in the pocketbook—where it hurts." Kargman pressured several local businesses to cancel contracts with Lincoln Towing Service. In an interview, Cascio commented, "Most of these firms that canceled have informed me they'd be back after the aldermanic elections are over and the heat is off." Shortly after the aldermanic race, a mob of 300 people attacked a Lincoln Towing employee who was removing a car from a parking lot.

After being elected to the council, Simpson and his staff investigated the firm's actions. The Chicago City Council debated taking actions against the firm.

In 1972, Chicago folk singer Steve Goodman wrote the song "Lincoln Park Pirates" about Lincoln Towing Service. Although he originally only performed the song in Chicago, he was eventually convinced that the sentiments of the song were recognizable outside Chicago. A portion of the lyrics were written during visits to Alderman Simpson's office, with Goodman utilizing documents from Simpson's investigation into the firm as reference material. Although initially Chicago stations would not play the song with Ross Cascio's name in it for fear of lawsuits, eventually it became known that Cascio was proud of the song and airplay followed.

=== 1990s and 2000s ===
In 1992, the firm, then headed by Steve Mash, was charged with possession of stolen vehicles after detectives witnessed the company's employees tow a car and the next day witnessed employees strip the car and transfer the materials to a scrap metal recycling company. The company and Mash were acquitted of the charges.

According to Illinois Commerce Commission (ICC) Police Commander Craig Baner, Lincoln Towing Service had 2078 complaints from 2000 to 2005. However, with the volume of business the towing service conducts, the complaint rates are comparable with other towing companies in Illinois. During the same period, Lincoln Towing issued 139 full refunds, a percentage which Baner says the towing service compares with other companies.

=== 2010s & 2020s ===
In October 2015, following a concert at the Aragon Ballroom, Lincoln Towing towed cars belonging to concertgoers from an adjacent lot. Following the incident, a tow truck driver allegedly verbally harassed motorists who came to reclaim their vehicles and assaulted a cyclist. Forty-seventh Ward alderman Ameya Pawar reacted by proposing to shut down the company, stating "They’re bad actors; they're just an outrageous operator and I'm looking at every option available in order to strike back."

On February 10, 2016, Aldermen Pawar and Ariel Reboyras introduced a City Council resolution citing "a pattern of illegal towing and abuse of customers by Lincoln Towing" and calling on company representatives to appear before the council. The following month, company attorney Allen Perl attended a City Council meeting and argued with Pawar. In June, the City Council passed the Chicago Towing Bill of Rights requiring, among other things, that towing operators notify the Chicago Police Department of where they have contracts to tow from, and that they install cameras in all tow trucks.

On February 24, 2016, the ICC initiated an investigation into Lincoln Towing's continuing eligibility to hold an Illinois relocation towing license. On July 2, 2018, the ICC's Administrative Law Judge issued a ruling, which said commerce commission staff dramatically overstated Lincoln Towing violations. The judge concluded Lincoln Towing is fit, willing and able to continue towing cars.

However, on September 12, 2018, the ICC revoked Lincoln Towing's Illinois relocation towing license. Thereafter, a Cook County judge ruled that Lincoln Towing Service could resume operating while it challenged a decision by state regulators to revoke its license.

On June 12, 2019, the ICC announced that its decision was final, and would accept no further appeals. However, the Circuit Court case remained active, and Lincoln Towing was allowed to continue operations.

On January 15, 2020, Circuit Court Judge Neil Cohen reinstated Lincoln Towing's ICC license, ruling that the ICC had improperly revoked it.

In October 2026, a Cook County jury returned an award of $2.85 million against Lincoln Towing for improperly towing a vehicle and brandishing a gun at its owner, Jermall Harvey. Illinois state law requires towing companies to release a vehicle if the owner approaches before the tow is completed. Instead, the tow operator sped off with Harvey on the hood of his car for several blocks, until the passenger pointed a gun at him. The award was the largest award of punitive damages ever granted in the Cook County municipal courts.
