= Hanes Walton Jr. =

American political scientist (1941–2013)

- Born: September 25, 1941; Augusta, Georgia, U.S.
- Died: January 8, 2013 (aged 71)
- Education: Morehouse College; Atlanta University; Howard University
- Known for: Developing the study of African-American politics
- Spouse: Alice
- Children: 2
- Awards: Guggenheim Fellowship; Rockefeller Foundation Fellowship; Ford Foundation Fellowship
- Scientific career
- Fields: Political science
- Workplaces: Atlanta University; Savannah State College; The University of Georgia; University of Michigan

Hanes Walton Jr. (September 25, 1941 – January 8, 2013) was an American political scientist and professor of African-American studies who pioneered the study of race in American politics. He was an early advocate for the creation of African-American politics as a subfield of political science, and he has been credited with developing the scientific study of Black politics. Walton published dozens of books and more than 100 journal articles or book chapters, investigating topics like African-American political participation and representation, Black conservatism, political parties in the United States, and the American presidency.

== Education and early career ==
Walton was born in Augusta, Georgia, on September 25, 1941. He was educated in Athens, Georgia, graduating from the public school system with honors in 1959.

Walton attended Morehouse College as an undergraduate, earning his AB degree in 1963. He then went to Atlanta University for graduate school, earning an MA degree in 1964. Walton pursued his PhD in government at Howard University, graduating in 1967. This made Walton the first person to ever receive a PhD in government from Howard University.

== Career ==
In 1966, Walton was hired as a faculty member at Atlanta University. In 1967 he moved to Savannah State College, and then returned to Atlanta University in 1971. In 1984 he became a professor at The University of Georgia, also accepting a faculty associate position at the University of Michigan in 1992. He was a professor at the University of Michigan for the remainder of his career, but his affiliation with The University of Georgia continued until 2013. At the University of Michigan, Walton was affiliated both with the political science department and the Center for Afroamerican and African Studies.

Walton was a prolific writer, publishing dozens of books and textbooks during his career, with some sources attributing 21 books to him and others attributing as many as 25. Several of these books, such as African American power and politics: The political context variable, The political philosophy of Martin Luther King, Jr., and Black politics and black political behavior: A linkage analysis, continue to be actively cited years after Walton's death. Walton has also been credited with publishing 80 journal articles and 25 book chapters. Walton's publications in highly selective journals like the American Journal of Political Science and the Journal of Politics include early studies of gender differences in political perceptions, particularly as these differences intersect with race when it comes to African-American candidates and voters, as well as systematic studies of Black political parties.

Walton was elected to prominent service positions in the discipline, serving as the Vice President of the American Political Science Association from 2012 until 2013. He was also the recipient of several major awards, including winning the Guggenheim Fellowship in 1971, the Rockefeller Foundation Research Fellowship for Minority-Group Scholars in 1979, and a Ford Foundation fellowship in 1982.

== Personal life and death ==
Walton and his wife, Alice, had two children. He died on January 8, 2013, aged 71.

== Legacy ==
Walton's work in developing the field of African-American political studies has been the subject of lecture series, as well as Robert C. Smith's book Hanes Walton, Jr.: Architect of the Black Science of Politics. Smith credits Walton with advocating for Black Politics to become a full subfield within the discipline of political science, and argues that Walton's work was an inextricable part of the Black Politics subfield for most of that subfield's early development.

Shortly following Walton's death, the University of Michigan held a memorial lecture for him; in a retrospective biography published by the Center for Political Studies there, his research activity was summarized as exploring "a wide range of topics including the presidency, elections, political parties, black political participation, black conservatism, and African-American involvement in political parties". Several subsequent lectures in honor of Walton have been held at major educational institutions, including the University of Michigan and the University of Illinois at Urbana-Champaign. Walton's contributions have also been honored by the establishment of endowments in his name to fund the study of race and politics. The central award in the study of racial and ethnic politics, presented by the American Political Science Association, is called the Hanes Walton Award in his honor.

At the time of Walton's death, then-Director of the University of Michigan Center for Political Studies, Nancy Burns, said that "Hanes Walton transformed a field" through "his books on black politics", as well as by being "a key mentor to generations of scholars in the field". Fellow University of Michigan political science professor Chuck Shipan said that Walton's "influence cannot be overstated" in the study of race in American politics, and that his work on political parties, the American presidency, and urban politics were also pioneering. Ravi K. Perry, the chair of the political science department at Howard University, has credited Walton with inspiring him to study politics.

== Selected works ==
- The political philosophy of Martin Luther King, Jr. (1971)
- Black politics and black political behavior: A linkage analysis (1994)
- African American power and politics: The political context variable (1997)

== Selected awards ==
- Guggenheim Fellowship (1971)
- Rockefeller Foundation Fellowship (1979)
- Ford Foundation Fellowship (1982)
