= Black Bloc (Sudan) =

Political organisation in Anglo-Egyptian Sudan

Black Bloc الكتلة السوداء
- Founded: 1948
- Headquarters: Nuba Mountains
- Ideology: Black Sudanese interests

The Black Bloc (Arabic: الكتلة السوداء) was a political organisation in Sudan which aimed to represent the interests of Black Sudanese. The Black Bloc emerged in 1948 and was active throughout the colonial period. It was based in the Nuba Mountains. The Black Bloc faced resistance from other Sudanese political parties, who labelled it a racist organisation. The British colonial authorities, under pressure from these groups, denied the Black Bloc the ability to register itself as a political party.
