= Evelyn Hu-DeHart =

American historian

- 胡其瑜
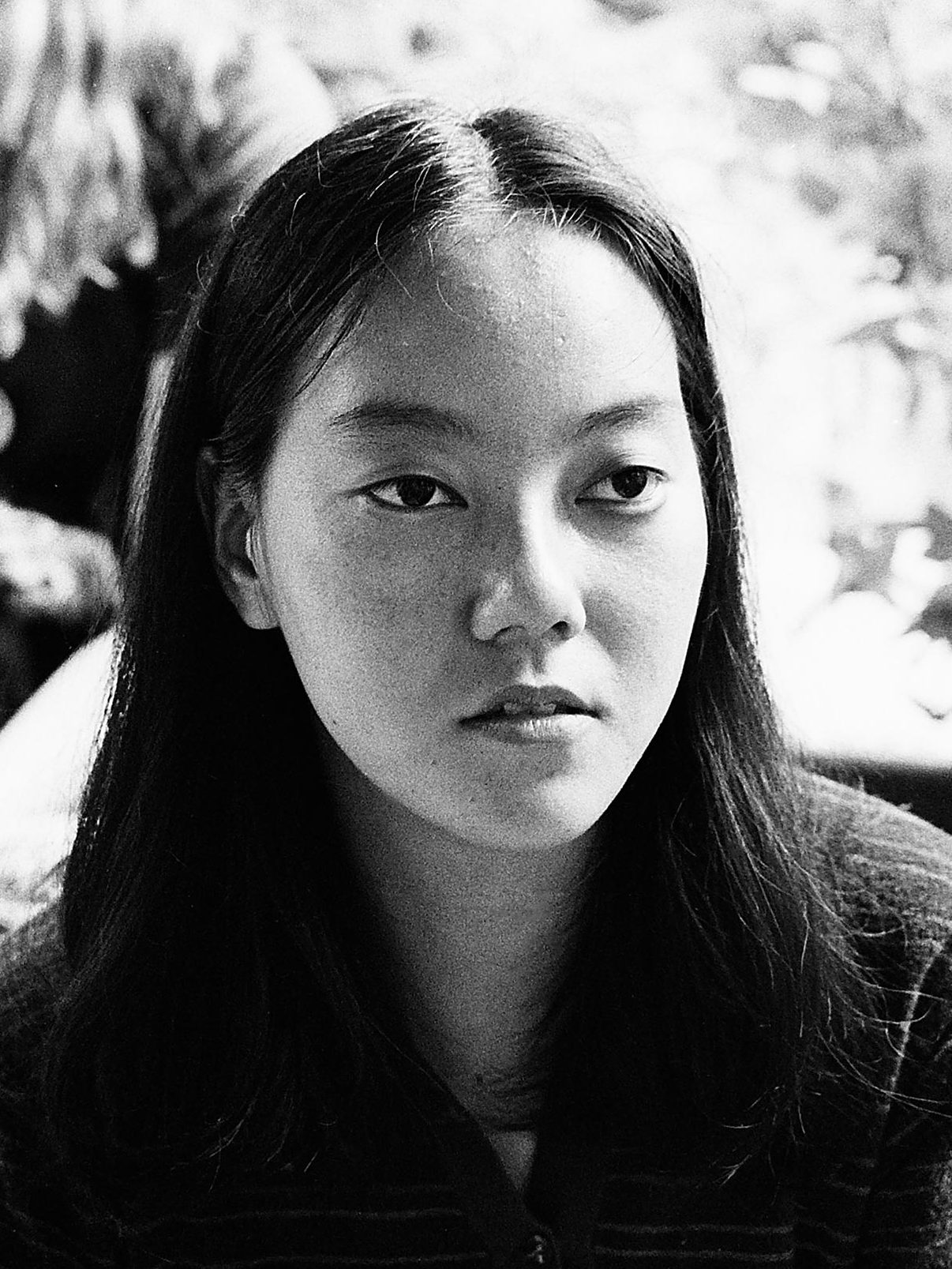
- Hu-DeHart at The University of Texas in 1970
- Born: February 12, 1947 (age 78); Chongqing, Sichuan, China
- Education: Stanford University; University of Texas at Austin
- Occupation(s): Historian, Author, Professor of History and American Studies
- Employer(s): Washington University in St. Louis; CUNY Graduate Center; University of Colorado Boulder; Brown University

Evelyn Hu-DeHart (Chinese: 胡其瑜; pinyin: Hú Qíyú) is a Professor of History and a Professor of American Studies at Brown University.

== Biography ==
Hu-DeHart was born in Chongqing, China in 1947. Her family fled to Hong Kong in 1949 and then to the United States in 1959. She received a full scholarship to attend Stanford University in 1965 at the age of 17 and graduated in 1968 with a B.A. in Political Science with Honors, and was recognized with the Dinkelspiel Award. Her encounter with the Civil rights movement and Third World activism was particularly influential during those years. After a Fulbright to Brazil, she proceeded to receive her Ph.D. at the University of Texas at Austin in 1976 in Latin American History.

She then joined the Department of History in the Arts and Sciences at Washington University in St. Louis, where she stayed from 1973 to 1985, initially as an Instructor and was promoted to an Associate Professor with tenure. She then moved to the CUNY Graduate Center, where she taught until 1988. After which, she served as the first Director of the Center for Studies of Ethnicity and Race in America (CSERA) at the University of Colorado Boulder. She then became a Professor of History and Ethnic Studies at Brown University, as well as the Director of the school's Center for the Study of Race and Ethnicity in America in 2002.

Additionally, she received a Doctor of Laws honoris causa from the University of Notre Dame in 2003. She has lectured and held visiting appointments in Mexico, Peru, Cuba, France, Hong Kong, Taiwan, and China, as well as at Wesleyan University, New York University, and the University of Michigan.

== Academic work ==
Hu-DeHart has authored three books, served as editor for four edited volumes, and penned dozens of articles and chapters. She began her career with two books on the Yaqui people of northwest Mexico and its borderlands. After which, her attention turned towards the lost history of Asian migration in Latin America, focusing in particular to their histories in Cuba, Peru, and Mexico, where she examined the ways these immigrants have contributed to their respective societies and cultures. More broadly, she is a noted theorist of diasporas and transnationalism, as well as multicultural education in the United States.

== Selected publications ==
- Missionaries, Miners, and Indians: History of Spanish Contact with the Yaqui Indians of Northwestern New Spain, 1533–1830 (1981)
- Yaqui Resistance and Survival: Struggle for Land and Autonomy, 1821–1910 (1984)
- Across the Pacific: Asian Americans and Globalization (Editor) (1999)
- Voluntary Associations in the Chinese Diaspora (co-edited with Khun Eng Kuah-Pearce) (2006)
- Latino Politics en Ciencia Política: The Search for Latino Identity and Racial Consciousness (co-edited with Tony Affigne and Marion Orr) (2014)
