= Perspectives on Political Science =

- Discipline: Political philosophy
- Language: English
- Edited by: Daniel Mahoney

Publication details
- History: 1990–present
- Publisher: Routledge
- Frequency: Quarterly

Standard abbreviations
- ISO 4: Perspect. Political Sci.

Indexing
- ISSN: 1045-7097 (print); 1930-5478 (web)
- LCCN: 90657743
- OCLC no.: 70293146

Links
- Journal homepage; Online access; Online archive

Perspectives on Political Science is a quarterly peer-reviewed academic journal covering political philosophy. The journal was established in 1990 by merging Teaching Political Science (1973–1989) and Perspective (1972–1989). It is abstracted and indexed in Scopus.
