= Nico Calavita =

Urban planning scholar

- Occupations: Urban planner; academic
- Known for: His work on inclusionary housing and land value capture; Campaigns for San Diego's housing trust fund and inclusionary housing ordinance
- Title: Professor emeritus of city planning
- Board member of: Citizens Coordinate for Century 3 (1988–1994; from 2005); Partners for Livable San Diego (1988–1990); San Diego Housing Trust Fund board of trustees (from 1990; later chair); City Heights Community Development Corporation (1998–2003); City of Berkeley Housing Advisory Commission
- Awards: Journal of the American Planning Association best article honorable mention (1995); Fulbright Senior Specialist, Roma Tre University (2005); Marilyn Gittell Activist Scholar Award (2016)

Academic background
- Education: University of Florence (doctorate in architecture and urban planning, 1970); University of Delaware (postgraduate study in urban sociology, 1971–1974)

Academic work
- Discipline: Urban planning
- Sub-discipline: Housing policy
- School or tradition: equity planning
- Institutions: New Castle County Department of Planning (1970–1980); San Diego State University (1980–2009); University of California, San Diego (adjunct, from 1986)
- Main interests: Affordable housing and community development; Housing trust funds; Growth management and the politics of urban growth; Comparative planning
- Notable works: "Inclusionary Housing in California: The Experience of Two Decades" (1998, with Kenneth Grimes); Inclusionary Housing in International Perspective (2010, edited with Alan Mallach)
- Notable ideas: Inclusionary housing as a form of land value recapture

Nico Calavita is an urban planning scholar and professor emeritus in the Graduate Program in City Planning at San Diego State University.

Calavita has written on inclusionary housing, housing trust funds, land value capture and the politics of urban growth. He also pushed for two of them. In San Diego, he joined the local campaigns that won the city a housing trust fund and inclusionary housing requirements.

With Alan Mallach he edited Inclusionary Housing in International Perspective (2010), a comparative study of inclusionary housing in seven countries published by the Lincoln Institute of Land Policy. In 2016 he received the Marilyn Gittell Activist Scholar Award of the Urban Affairs Association.

== Education ==
Calavita studied architecture and urban planning at the University of Florence in Italy from 1964 to 1970, receiving a doctorate. From 1971 to 1974 he did postgraduate work in urban sociology at the University of Delaware.

== Career ==
=== New Castle County ===
From 1970 to 1980 Calavita was a planner in the Department of Planning of New Castle County, Delaware. He was responsible for the land use component of the New Castle County Comprehensive Plan between 1978 and 1980, and in 1977 he prepared a preservation plan for the historic town of Christiana for the state's Division of Historical and Cultural Affairs. From 1971 he worked on the county's Corridor Plan, a scheme for a new town of about 120,000 residents between Interstate 95 and U.S. Route 40, which he designed and whose feasibility study he directed. The plan received a "New County U.S.A." Achievement Award from the National Association of Counties in 1974. In the same period he taught as an instructor in the University of Delaware's departments of sociology and civil engineering.

=== San Diego State University ===
Calavita joined the Graduate Program in City Planning at San Diego State University (SDSU) as an assistant professor in 1980. He was promoted to associate professor in 1985 and to professor in 1995, and he coordinated the graduate program from 1987 to 1998. His courses included planning history, urban design, planning implementation and housing policy. He became professor emeritus in 2009, (Note: Calavita's CV gives 2009 as the start of his emeritus status. The 2016 SAGE profile states that he retired in 2010.) after about thirty years of teaching at SDSU. From 1986 he also taught as an adjunct professor in the Urban Studies and Planning Program at the University of California, San Diego, where he offered a course on land use planning from 1994 to 2004.

Calavita held teaching fellowships from the Italian Ministry of Public Instruction at the University of Florence's school of architecture in 1985 and 1990, and at the University of Naples' school of urban design in 1998, 2000 and 2002. In 2005 he was a Fulbright Senior Specialist at the Department of Urban Studies of Roma Tre University. From 2012 to 2015 he taught urban planning history and theory in an international doctoral program in urban revitalization and economic development at the University of Reggio Calabria. He spent a sabbatical year in Barcelona in 1997.

Outside the university, Calavita advised Tijuana's municipal planning institute, the Instituto Municipal de Planeación (IMPlan), on its 2020 master plan and a downtown urban design plan between 2000 and 2002. In San Diego he was a consultant to the Euclid-Market Action Team, which prepared a land use and transportation plan for the Encanto neighborhoods in 2001 and 2002. From 2000 to 2005 he was a member of a housing team formed by the Jacobs Foundation to plan affordable housing on its property at Euclid Avenue and Market Street.

=== Housing policy in San Diego ===
Calavita has described his move into housing advocacy as gradual. It began in 1986, when he built his graduate site planning class around a visit to San Ysidro by a Regional/Urban Design Assistance Team of the American Institute of Architects. In May 1988 he organized a conference at SDSU on "balanced communities", whose speakers included Oscar Newman and Mary Brooks. By his account, the conference set in motion the process through which the city established a housing trust fund in 1990, financed by linkage fees on commercial development. The City Council appointed him to the fund's board of trustees in 1990, and he chaired the board during the 1990s. (Note: Calavita's CV lists him as vice-chair and then chair of the board from 1992 to 1995. In a 2016 interview he said that he became chair in 1996.) With Kenneth Grimes, a San Diego Housing Commission planner and former student of his, he later published an account of the fund's creation in the Journal of Planning Education and Research.

In 1990 and 1991 Calavita sat on the city's Future Urbanizing Area Advisory Committee. The Urban Affairs Association's 2016 award citation quoted a nominator who described him as "central to the adoption of IH [inclusionary housing] for the 12,000-acre Future Urbanizing Area of the City of San Diego". He was a co-founder of the San Diego Affordable Housing Coalition, which campaigned for a citywide inclusionary housing ordinance. The ordinance required developers to make 10 percent of the units in new projects affordable or to pay an in-lieu fee, and the City Council adopted it in the early 2000s. (Note: Sources differ on the year. The Urban Affairs Association's award citation and Calavita's 2016 interview with SAGE give 2002. Voice of San Diego refers to "the 2003 inclusionary policy", and Calavita wrote in 2004 that the city had adopted inclusionary housing in the summer of 2003.) Calavita has said that by 2016 the trust fund and the ordinance's in-lieu fees had together raised about $140 million for affordable housing.

In 2018 a Voice of San Diego analysis found that nearly a quarter of roughly $85 million in inclusionary fees spent by city housing officials over 15 years had gone to homebuyer assistance, homelessness programs and administrative costs rather than to building housing. Calavita told the publication that when the policy was adopted "the assumption was the money would be spent on building affordable housing", though he said he did not necessarily object to some of the money going to homeless programs.

Calavita served on the board of the City Heights Community Development Corporation from 1998 to 2003 and on the board of Citizens Coordinate for Century 3 (C-3), where he chaired its housing committee. He also sat on housing and walkable-communities committees of the San Diego Association of Governments (SANDAG). He has written more than two dozen opinion pieces on housing, growth and planning, most of them for The San Diego Union-Tribune, with others in the Los Angeles Times, the San Francisco Chronicle and El País. In 2003 he and Norman Krumholz published an article in the Journal of Planning Education and Research urging planning academics to write for newspaper opinion pages.

=== Bay Area ===
After retiring, Calavita moved to Berkeley, California. He worked with the East Bay Housing Organizations on land value recapture. With Marian Wolfe he wrote a 2014 white paper for the organization on "public benefit zoning", funded through a HUD Sustainable Communities grant to the Metropolitan Transportation Commission. On March 9, 2016, he testified before the California State Senate's Transportation and Housing Committee at an informational hearing titled "Innovative Solutions to Build Affordable Housing", with a presentation on land values and value capture. By 2024 he was a member of the City of Berkeley's Housing Advisory Commission.

== Research ==
Calavita's research has dealt with affordable housing and community development, growth management, the politics of growth and comparative planning. He describes his approach as following the principles of equity planning, which he summarizes as the idea that "planners should strive to provide more choices to those who have few, if any".

His early publications concerned Italian planning, among them a 1983 article in Environment and Planning D: Society and Space on urban planning, the state and political regimes in Italy. After moving to San Diego he wrote on the city's growth politics. His work there included a 1992 article in the Journal of Urban Affairs on growth machines and ballot-box planning, and a comparative study of planners' attitudes toward growth, written with Roger Caves for the Journal of the American Planning Association in 1994.

Much of his later work concerns inclusionary housing. With Grimes and Mallach he compared inclusionary programs in California and New Jersey in Housing Policy Debate in 1997. With Grimes he reviewed two decades of inclusionary housing in California in a 1998 article in the Journal of the American Planning Association. The Supreme Court of California cited the 1998 article in California Building Industry Assn. v. City of San Jose (2015), the decision in which it upheld San Jose's inclusionary housing ordinance. With Victoria Basolo of the University of California, Irvine, he wrote a critique of a Reason Foundation study of inclusionary housing in the San Francisco Bay Area.

His 1997 research in Barcelona produced "Behind Barcelona's Success Story: Citizen Movements and Planners' Power", written with Amador Ferrer and published in the Journal of Urban History in 2000. The article was reprinted in Transforming Barcelona (2004), a volume edited by Tim Marshall.

With Mallach, Calavita edited Inclusionary Housing in International Perspective: Affordable Housing, Social Inclusion, and Land Value Recapture, published by the Lincoln Institute of Land Policy in 2010. The book has country chapters on the United States, Canada, England, Ireland, France, Spain and Italy. A further chapter surveys programs elsewhere, among them South Africa, Israel, India, Colombia and Malaysia. Calavita wrote or co-wrote seven of the ten chapters, including the introduction, the conclusion and the chapters on Ireland, Spain and Italy. Within the chapter on the United States, he wrote the account of California's programs. The reviewer James J. Kelly Jr. wrote that, although listed as editors, Calavita and Mallach were "essentially the co-authors of the book".

A central argument of the book is that inclusionary housing is best justified as a way for the public to recapture increases in land value created by government action, such as rezoning. Calavita and Mallach set out a version of this idea in a 2009 article in the Lincoln Institute's Land Lines, which proposed tying inclusionary requirements to rezoning. Calavita returned to the subject in a 2015 issue of the American Planning Association's Zoning Practice devoted to value capture and community benefits.

== Critical reception of his work ==
Inclusionary Housing in International Perspective was reviewed in the Journal of the American Planning Association, the Journal of Urban Affairs, Urban Studies, Housing Studies, the International Journal of Housing Policy, the Journal of Planning Education and Research, the Berkeley Planning Journal and the Journal of Affordable Housing & Community Development Law.

William M. Rohe called it "an essential resource for academics, policy makers, and practitioners interested in IH". He attributed the cohesion of its chapters to the editors having written all but one of the country studies, and he faulted the absence of a rigorous analysis of who bears the costs of inclusionary programs. Jake Wegmann wrote that the book combined "a wide geographic scope with a consistency of voice and editorial coherence that is unusual in an edited volume". Kirk McClure described it as balanced, neither advocating for nor arguing against inclusionary housing. He found it strongest on the debate between compensating developers and recapturing land value, and wanted an account of what the housing bubble did to inclusionary programs in countries such as Ireland and Spain.

The editors argue that inclusionary housing spread outward from the United States. Michael Oxley wrote that “there is no convincing evidence of a process of policy transfer from the US”, and found the drawbacks of inclusionary policies underplayed. He nonetheless judged the comparative analysis “commendable”. Ann Ziebarth recommended the book to planning educators and practitioners but said she was not certain she agreed with the editors' conclusion that inclusionary housing is the best available means of linking affordable housing to social inclusion. Geir Inge Orderud found the survey chapter on countries outside Europe and North America uneven in quality.

== Awards and honors ==
- 2005: Fulbright Senior Specialist, Roma Tre University
- 2016: Marilyn Gittell Activist Scholar Award, Urban Affairs Association and SAGE Publishing

== Selected publications ==
=== Books ===
- Calavita, Nico; Mallach, Alan, eds. (2010). Inclusionary Housing in International Perspective: Affordable Housing, Social Inclusion, and Land Value Recapture. Cambridge, Massachusetts: Lincoln Institute of Land Policy. ISBN 978-1-55844-209-2.

=== Articles ===
- Calavita, Nico (1983). "Urban Planning, the State, and Political Regimes: The Italian Case". Environment and Planning D: Society and Space. 1 (4): 377–395. Bibcode:1983EnPlD...1..377C. doi:10.1068/d010377.
- Calavita, Nico (1992). "Growth Machines and Ballot Box Planning: The San Diego Case". Journal of Urban Affairs. 14 (1): 1–24. doi:10.1111/j.1467-9906.1992.tb00272.x.
- Calavita, Nico; Grimes, Kenneth (1992). "The Establishment of the San Diego Housing Trust Fund: Lessons for Theory and Practice". Journal of Planning Education and Research. 11 (3): 170–184. doi:10.1177/0739456X9201100302.
- Calavita, Nico; Caves, Roger (1994). "Planners' Attitude Toward Growth: A Comparative Case Study". Journal of the American Planning Association. 60 (4): 483–500. doi:10.1080/01944369408975606.
- Calavita, Nico; Grimes, Kenneth; Mallach, Alan (1997). "Inclusionary Housing in California and New Jersey: A Comparative Analysis". Housing Policy Debate. 8 (1): 109–142. doi:10.1080/10511482.1997.9521249.
- Calavita, Nico; Grimes, Kenneth (1998). "Inclusionary Housing in California: The Experience of Two Decades". Journal of the American Planning Association. 64 (2): 150–169. doi:10.1080/01944369808975973.
- Calavita, Nico; Ferrer, Amador (2000). "Behind Barcelona's Success Story: Citizen Movements and Planners' Power". Journal of Urban History. 26 (6): 793–807. doi:10.1177/009614420002600604.
- Calavita, Nico; Krumholz, Norman (2003). "Capturing the Public Interest: Using Newspaper Op-Eds to Promote Planning in Conservative Times". Journal of Planning Education and Research. 22 (4): 400–406. doi:10.1177/0739456X03022004006.
- Calavita, Nico; Mallach, Alan (January 2009). "Inclusionary Housing, Incentives, and Land Value Recapture". Land Lines. Lincoln Institute of Land Policy.
- Calavita, Nico (June 2015). "Value Capture and Community Benefits". Zoning Practice (6). American Planning Association.
