= Journal of Urban Affairs =

- Discipline: Urban Studies
- Language: English
- Edited by: Bernadette Hanlon

Publication details
- History: 1979–present
- Publisher: Routledge on behalf of the Urban Affairs Association
- Frequency: 10/year
- Impact factor: 3.377 (2020)

Standard abbreviations
- ISO 4: J. Urban Aff.

Indexing
- ISSN: 0735-2166 (print); 1467-9906 (web)
- OCLC no.: 8261798

Links
- Journal homepage; Online access; Online archive

The Journal of Urban Affairs is a peer-reviewed academic journal published ten times per year by Routledge on behalf of the Urban Affairs Association. It was established in 1979 and the current editor-in-chief is Bernadette Hanlon (Ohio State University).

According to the Journal Citation Reports, the journal has a 2020 impact factor of 3.377.

== Abstracting and indexing ==
The journal is indexed in several bibliographic databases, including:

- Science Citation Index Expanded (Clarivate)
- Scopus
- EBSCO

== Editors-in-chief ==
The following persons are or have been editor-in-chief:

- Patricia Klobus Edwards (1981–1984)
- John R. Gist (1984–1987)
- Scott Cummings and Knowlton W. Johnson (1987–1989)
- Scott Cummings and C. Theodore Koebel (1989–1992)
- Scott Cummings and Hank Savitch (1993–1998)
- Scott Cummnings (1998–2005)
- Victoria Basolo (2005–2010)
- Laura Reese (2010–2015)
- Igor Vojnovic (2015–2021)
- Bernadette Hanlon (2021–present)
