= Urban Affairs Review =

Bi-monthly academic journal

- Discipline: Urban studies
- Language: English
- Edited by: Richardson Dilworth, Maureen Donaghy, Christina Greer, Mara Sidney, Timothy Weaver, and Yue Zhang

Publication details
- Former name: Urban Affairs Quarterly
- History: 1965-present
- Publisher: SAGE Publications
- Frequency: Bimonthly
- Impact factor: 2.387 (2021)

Standard abbreviations
- ISO 4: Urban Aff. Rev.

Indexing
- CODEN: UAREFI
- ISSN: 1078-0874 (print); 1552-8332 (web)
- LCCN: 95642141
- OCLC no.: 231645531

Links
- Journal homepage; Online access; Online archive

Urban Affairs Review is a bimonthly peer-reviewed academic journal that covers the field of urban studies, including urban policy, urban economic development, and residential and community development. The journal's editors-in-chief are Richardson Dilworth (Drexel University), Maureen Donaghy (Rutgers University at Camden), Christina Greer (Fordham University), Mara Sidney (Rutgers University at Newark), Timothy Weaver (SUNY Albany), and Yue Zhang (University of Illinois at Chicago). It was established in 1965 as Urban Affairs Quarterly and obtained its current title in 1996. It is published by SAGE Publications in association with the Urban Politics Section of the American Political Science Association.

== Abstracting and indexing ==
The journal is abstracted and indexed in Scopus and the Social Sciences Citation Index. According to the Journal Citation Reports, its 2021 impact factor is 2.387, ranking it 25 out of 42 journals in the category "Urban Studies".

== Editors-in-chief ==
- Marilyn J. Gittell (1965-1970)
- Peter Bouxsein (1970-1973)
- Louis H. Masotti (1974-1980)
- Albert Hunter and Robert L. Lineberry (1980-1981)
- Margaret T. Gordon, Albert Hunter and Robert L. Lineberry (1981-1982)
- Margaret T. Gordon and Albert Hunter (1982-1984)
- Albert Hunter (1984-1985)
- Dennis R. Judd and Donald Phares (1985-1992)
- Dennis R. Judd (1992-2002)
- Susan E. Clarke, Gary L. Gaile and Michael A. Pagano (2002-2009)
- Susan E. Clarke and Michael A. Pagano (2009-2013)
- Peter Burns, Jered B. Carr, Annette Steinacker, Jill Tao, and Antonio Tavares (2014-2019)
- Phil Ashton, Peter Burns, Jered B. Carr, Joshua Drucker, and Yue Zhang (2020-2022)
- Richardson Dilworth, Maureen Donaghy, Christina Greer, Mara Sidney, Timothy Weaver, and Yue Zhang (2023-present)
