= Ford Heights School District 169 =

School district in Illinois, United States

Address
- 910 Woodlawn Avenue Ford Heights, Illinois, 60411; United States

District information
- Type: Public
- Grades: PreK–8
- NCES District ID: 1710950

Students and staff
- Students: 444

Other information
- Website: www.fordheights169.org

Ford Heights School District 169 is a public school district based in Ford Heights, Illinois, United States.

The district is bordered by Joe Orr Road on the north, Stoney Island Avenue to the east, State Street on the west and the Conrail tracks to the south.

== Schools ==
- Cottage Grove Upper Grade Center (Grades 5–8)
- Medgar Evers Primary Academic Center (Grades PK-4)

== High school ==
Students in grades 9-12 who live within the boundaries of Ford Heights School District 169 attend Bloom Trail High School , operated by Bloom Township High School District 206.

== See also ==
- List of school districts in Illinois
