= Charles Panici =

American politician (1930–2017)

Mayor of Chicago Heights, Illinois
- In office 1975–1991

Personal details
- Born: December 26, 1930 Chicago Heights, Illinois, U.S.
- Died: December 20, 2017 (aged 87) Chicago Heights, Illinois, U.S.
- Party: Republican
- Occupation: Politician

Charles "Chuck" Panici (December 26, 1930 – December 20, 2017) was an American politician who served as mayor of Chicago Heights, Illinois, from 1975 to 1991. He was also head of the Bloom Township Republican Party from 1978 to 1992. He was born in 1930 in the "Hungry Hill" section of Chicago Heights, a south suburb, which was the home to mainly Italian immigrants in a heavily Italian town. His parents operated "Three Star Restaurant", a popular hangout for many neighborhood residents.

== Political career ==
Panici began his political career in the early 1970s as President of the Chicago Heights Park District. In 1975, he put together a coalition ticket and easily defeated the incumbent mayor. His Concerned Citizens ticket won three of the four seats on the city council. In 1979, Panici won again, with his entire city council slate of John Gliottoni, Louise Marshall and Eugene Sadus winning re-election. They were joined by Nicholas C. "Nick" LoBue, and all five won easy victories in 1983 and 1987. His administration was responsible for bringing Lake Michigan water to Chicago Heights after residents had complained for years about poor water quality. Several municipal buildings were also built during his tenure, including a new City Hall, police station and library.

Beginning in 1978, Panici was the Bloom Township Republican Committeeman. With a patronage army that spanned all levels of city and township government. During Panici's time as Bloom Township's Republican leader, it consistently turned out one of the highest Republican vote totals in the Chicago suburbs. This made the Bloom GOP one of the most powerful political organizations in Illinois. The party backed winning candidates in every city, park district, school district and township race during the 1980s.

Panici was also responsible for fostering the political careers of numerous local officials, state legislators and judges during that time. He was instrumental in the campaigns of Governor Jim Thompson. The party became so powerful that Bloom Township High School hosted President Ronald Reagan in 1986 and then-Vice President George H. W. Bush in 1988. Panici even forged alliances with Democrats, and was partly responsible for bringing former Cook County Democratic chairman Edward Vrdolyak to the county's Republican party. Panici also organized a crossover vote in 1992 to defeat former congressman Gus Savage in the Democratic primary.

Panici co-founded Telecommunication Services (TCS) with two other Chicago Heights entrepreneurs, and the company grew rapidly during the 1980s and early 1990s, serving many of the area's hospitals and other businesses.

== FBI investigation ==
In 1988, south suburban mob boss Albert Tocco of Chicago Heights was indicted for a wide range of crimes, including racketeering, murder, extortion, and arson. He was also implicated by his wife in the murder of Anthony Spilotro, which was depicted in the movie Casino. Although he was never charged with the Spilotro killing, he would be convicted on many other charges in 1990 and sentenced to 200 years in prison. During the trial, LoBue's name was mentioned along with another Panici ally, former South Chicago Heights mayor Donald Prisco. Testimony alleged that LoBue and Prisco were accepting bribe money from Tocco in exchange for their help in keeping the garbage-hauling license for both cities in the hands of Tocco's Chicago Heights Disposal. This led federal investigators to open a wide-ranging probe of public corruption in Chicago Heights. In 1990, Chicago Heights Street Department superintendent Ernest Molyneaux pleaded guilty to accepting payoffs from Tocco and another city contractor and cooperated with the investigation, leading to the indictments of LoBue and Prisco later that year. The two were charged with multiple racketeering violations under the Racketeer Influenced and Corrupt Organizations Act (RICO). The investigation also led to the indictments of several other city officials on charges of bribery, tax evasion and other crimes. Under this cloud of controversy, Panici chose not to seek re-election as mayor in 1991. His hand-picked successor, Douglas Troiani, won an easy victory against Sadus, who had split with the party.

In March 1992, two weeks after the death of his wife, Panici was indicted along with Gliottoni and Marshall on federal charges of racketeering, extortion and bribery. He was also charged separately with witness tampering for directing a witness to lie to investigators. The indictment charged that the group extorted more than $700,000 from businesses in return for city contracts. Panici stepped down from his post as township Republican committeeman after the indictment.

LoBue and Prisco each pleaded guilty to lesser crimes and agreed to testify against the others. LoBue would tell a federal jury that nearly every major city contractor paid kickbacks to city council members and other public officials. LoBue testified that Panici decided how much bribe money would be required to secure each contract, and who would receive the payoffs. One of these schemes involved monthly payments from Tocco to LoBue and Panici. Prisco and lifelong Panici friend Ralph Galderio, a former city employee, also testified that Panici was involved in bribery and received significantly reduced sentences in return for their testimony. Panici was accused of personally taking nearly $260,000 in bribes during his 16 years as mayor.

Panici, Gliottoni and Marshall were convicted in 1993 on all charges. Panici was sentenced to 10 years in prison, Gliottoni to five years, six months and Marshall to four years. Over the next several years, other Panici allies would also head to prison. Bloom Township Supervisor Robert Grossi was sentenced to four years in prison in 1996 for misusing township funds, and former Chicago Heights Deputy Police Chief Sam Mangialardi would get a 10½ year sentence for his 1995 conviction on charges that he accepted $10,000 monthly payments to protect the city's top drug dealer. Panici was not involved in either case.

== After the fall ==
Panici was released in 2001, and returned to live in Chicago Heights. He has always maintained that LoBue, who admittedly had ties to organized crime, extorted city contractors without Panici's approval or knowledge. He published a book, "From Hero to Zero: How the Feds and a Mafia Wannabe Took a Good Man Down" in 2013 detailing his version of the events leading up to his trial and imprisonment. In his later years, he remained active in local politics, advising several candidates successfully. Panici died in Chicago Heights on December 20, 2017, after a lengthy illness.
