= Sauk Village, Illinois =

- Village
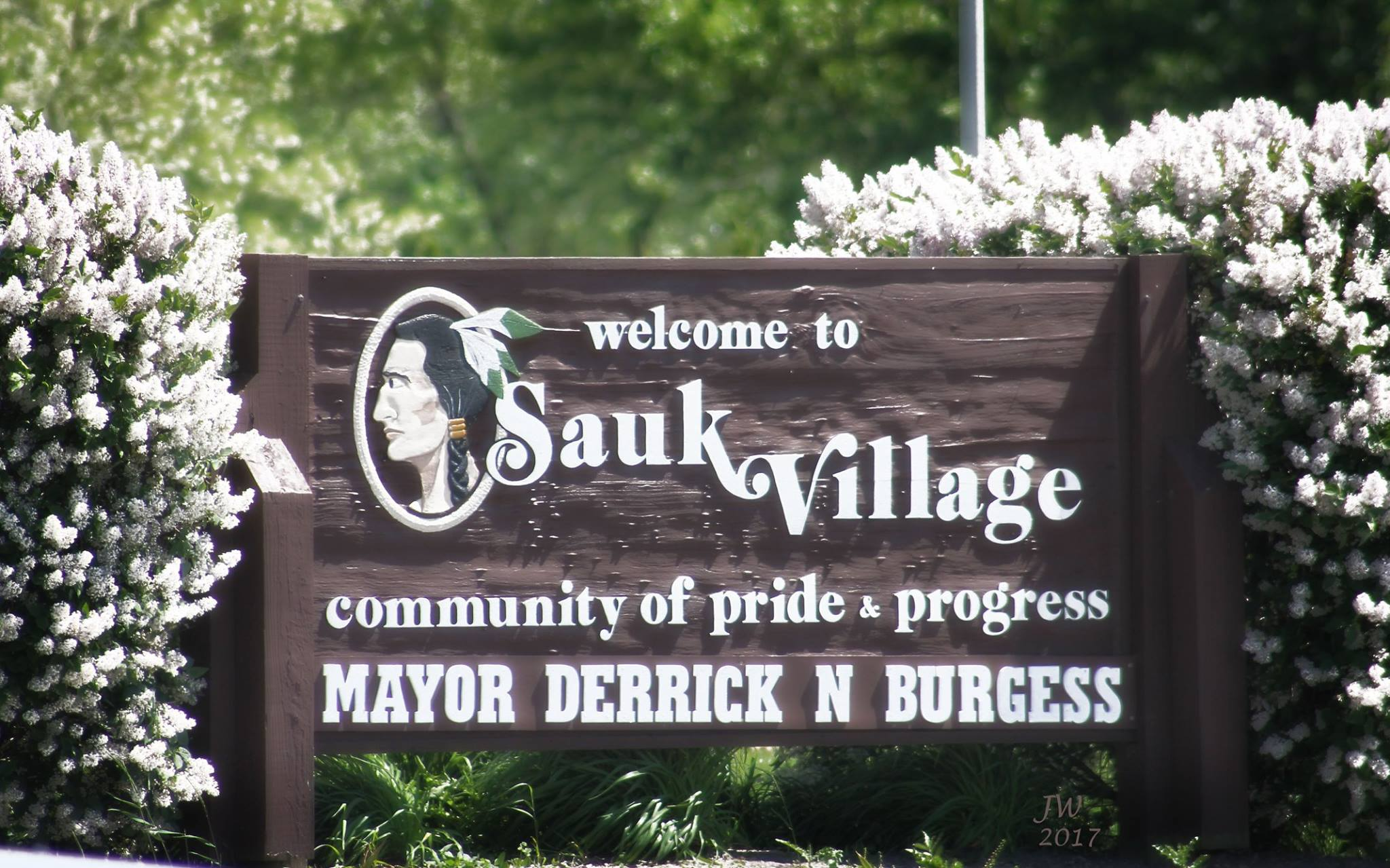

- logo
- Nickname: "The Village"
- Motto: Pride and Progress
- Location of Sauk Village in Cook County, Illinois.

- Location within Chicago metropolitan area Location within Illinois Location within the United States
- Coordinates: 41°29′19″N 87°33′56″W
- Country: United States
- State: Illinois
- Counties: Cook
- Township: Bloom
- Founded: 1842 (Incorporated on March 12, 1957)

Government
  - Type: Mayor (Village President) and Village Board of Trustees
  - Mayor: Marva Campbell-Pruitt (2025-present)
  - Trustees: Aretha Burns; Raven Johnson; Diane Sapp; Tyesha Jones; Michelle Sterling

Area
  - Total: 4.00 sq mi (10.35 km^{2})
  - Land: 3.99 sq mi (10.34 km^{2})
  - Water: 0.0039 sq mi (0.01 km^{2})

Population (2020)
  - Total: 9,921
  - Density: 2,485.2/sq mi (959.56/km^{2})
- Time zone: UTC-6 (CST)
  - Summer (DST): UTC-5 (CDT)
- ZIP Code(s): 60411
- Area code: 708
- FIPS code: 17-67769
- Website: www.saukvillage.org

Sauk Village (locally known as "The Village") is a village and a south suburb of Chicago in Cook County, Illinois, United States. The population was 9,921 at the 2020 census.

== Geography ==
Sauk Village is located at 41°29′19″N 87°33′56″W (41.488535, -87.565658).

According to the 2021 census gazetteer files, Sauk Village has a total area of 4.00 square miles (10.36 km^{2}), of which 3.99 square miles (10.33 km^{2}) (or 99.90%) is land and 0.00 square miles (0.00 km^{2}) (or 0.10%) is water.

The village stands on the Tinley Moraine. The Glenwood Shoreline cuts through the village.

Neighboring towns include the Illinois communities of Lynwood to the northeast, Ford Heights to the north, Chicago Heights to the northwest, South Chicago Heights to the west, Steger to the southwest, and Crete to the south. The town of Dyer, Indiana, is the nearest community to the east.

== Demographics ==
Historical population
Census	Pop.	Note	%±
1960	4,687		—
1970	7,479		59.6%
1980	10,906		45.8%
1990	9,926		−9.0%
2000	10,411		4.9%
2010	10,506		0.9%
2020	9,921		−5.6%
U.S. Decennial Census; 2010 2020

=== Racial and ethnic composition ===
Sauk Village, Illinois – Racial and ethnic composition Note: the US Census treats Hispanic/Latino as an ethnic category. This table excludes Latinos from the racial categories and assigns them to a separate category. Hispanics/Latinos may be of any race.
Race / Ethnicity (NH = Non-Hispanic)	Pop 2000	Pop 2010	Pop 2020	% 2000	% 2010	% 2020
White alone (NH)	5,540	2,496	1,436	53.21%	23.76%	14.47%
Black or African American alone (NH)	3,338	6,511	6,674	32.06%	61.97%	67.27%
Native American or Alaska Native alone (NH)	17	13	8	0.16%	0.12%	0.08%
Asian alone (NH)	68	30	41	0.65%	0.29%	0.41%
Pacific Islander alone (NH)	4	2	3	0.04%	0.02%	0.03%
Other race alone (NH)	14	25	67	0.13%	0.24%	0.68%
Mixed race or Multiracial (NH)	206	258	364	1.98%	2.46%	3.67%
Hispanic or Latino (any race)	1,224	1,328	1,171	11.76%	11.15%	13.39%
Total	10,411	10,506	9,921	100.00%	100.00%	100.00%

=== 2020 census ===
As of the 2020 census, Sauk Village had a population of 9,921. The population density was 2,482.73 inhabitants per square mile (958.59/km^{2}). The median age was 33.2 years. 28.8% of residents were under the age of 18 and 11.2% of residents were 65 years of age or older. For every 100 females there were 88.4 males, and for every 100 females age 18 and over there were 82.6 males age 18 and over.

100.0% of residents lived in urban areas, while 0.0% lived in rural areas.

There were 3,254 households and 2,338 families in Sauk Village, of which 41.3% had children under the age of 18 living in them. Of all households, 32.0% were married-couple households, 17.9% were households with a male householder and no spouse or partner present, and 42.8% were households with a female householder and no spouse or partner present. About 21.1% of all households were made up of individuals and 6.9% had someone living alone who was 65 years of age or older. The average household size was 3.59 and the average family size was 3.17.

There were 3,740 housing units at an average density of 935.94 per square mile (361.37/km^{2}). Of those units, 13.0% were vacant. The homeowner vacancy rate was 4.0% and the rental vacancy rate was 9.8%.

=== Income and poverty ===
The median income for a household in the village was $46,061, and the median income for a family was $46,337. Males had a median income of $27,416 versus $25,698 for females. The per capita income for the village was $18,976. About 22.2% of families and 27.8% of the population were below the poverty line, including 52.2% of those under age 18 and 5.5% of those age 65 or over.

== History ==
The area that is now known as Sauk Village has been a center of activity for hundreds of years. Originally, several Native American tribes inhabited this land, which is a part of an area of high ground surrounding Lake Michigan known as the Valparaiso Moraine. The Native Americans used this high ground for transporting herd animals and trade items. Though the Potawatomi and Illinois Confederation tribes were native to the area, the Sauk people, from Michigan, became the namesake of the Sauk Trail. As the westward expansion increased during the 19th century, the Sauk tribes were forced to move westward. Annually, they would travel the Sauk Trail to collect treaty money from Canada and the United States.

This area was initially invaded by the American settlers in 1830 and consequently opened to them in 1838. Vincent Sauter and Frederick Richards came to Bloom in 1839, and settled at New Strasburg (soon to be Sauk Village). Christian Millar, the first blacksmith, and H. Beekley, the first house carpenter, located here in 1842. Though the original settlers of Sauk Village moved here from the East Coast, their roots were in Western Europe, especially France and Germany. The first immigrants to the area were Hiram Wood, Henry Ayen, and Rowley. After these original settlers, a second wave of families moved to the Sauk Village area, including such familiar names such as Parrino, Gatto, Kavelage, Reichert, Sauter, Rickenberger, Kloss, Barnes, Jung, Schaller, Schmidt, Kline, and Peters. Postmaster Charles Sauter named the settlement Strassburg, after Strasbourg, France, home of many of the original settlers. Back when the area was originally being settled by Americans, land sold for $1.25 an acre.

In 1847, St. Jakob's Church was built. Father Francis Fischer was the first priest of the church, which had twenty parishioners. In 1871, the original church was struck by lightning and burned to the ground. The church was promptly rebuilt, only to be struck again in 1873. After this second lightning strike, the church was moved to what became the corner of Sauk Trail and the Calumet Expressway, where it would stand until its razing in 2004. The name of the church was changed from the German St. Jakob to St. James in 1917 as a result of anti-German attitudes due to World War I. During the Great Depression of the 1930s, St. James Church experienced a shortage in revenues. Area residents helped by hand-digging the basement of the church in order to create a hall that could be rented out. On November 11, 1940, a tornado touched down in the area, causing extensive damage to the roof of St. James Church. Area residents may have known the Old St. James Church as the Old Community Center. The graveyard directly behind where the Old St. James Church stood is the St. James Cemetery at Strassburg. It is the final resting place for many of Sauk Village's original settlers. While the church was being readied for demolition in 2004, former Trustee Richard Derosier, while cleaning the attic of the old church, stumbled over an old relic cross that once hung in the old St. James Church. The old relic cross now hangs at the entry to St. James Church some 150 years later. The original bell, cast in the 19th century, stands outside St. James Church today as a testament to the history and sacrifices of so many families of Sauk Village. St. James permanently closed in 2023.

When the Calumet Expressway was built in the late 1950s, the Strassburg area was seen as a prime real estate development. The AMBO I Construction firm moved into the area in 1956, building homes in what is now known as the Garden Section, near the Calumet Expressway and just south of Sauk Trail. The community was incorporated on March 12, 1957, as Sauk Village, since there was a town in southern Illinois that already had the name Strasburg. Thomas J. Nichols served as Sauk Village's first president.

Since its incorporation in 1957, Sauk Village has undergone considerable change and expansion. By 1961, a special census showed that Sauk Village had 1,258 homes and 5,774 residents. Strassburg and Cynthia Street (now known as Wagoner) Schools were built during this time to accommodate the needs of residents' children. Though construction came to a virtual halt during the mid-1960s, by the early 1970s development was beginning again. In 1970, Rickover Junior High School opened its doors, and additions were made to the existing schools. Throughout the 1970s, developments such as the Amber Manor Apartments (now known as the Crossroads), Surreybrook Plaza, and St. James Estates were booming. Under the direction of Mayor Theisen and the Village Board, the Village Hall and Police Station moved out of a renovated residential duplex to the now Old Village Hall in 1977 on Torrence Avenue. The building at the time would cost about $250,000, considerably less than the $5 million the new Village Hall would cost in 2008.

The area continued to expand through the early 1980s with the addition of more homes to the St. James Estates area and new subdivisions such as the Carlisle Estates and Southbrook. The Community Center behind the old Village Hall first opened its doors in 1982, coinciding with the village's 25th anniversary. In the late 1980s, construction began on the Sauk Pointe Industrial Park on Sauk Trail west of the Calumet Expressway. Pacesetter Steel became the first company to move into the park in 1988. During the same year, Sauk Plaza underwent a 1.1 million dollar renovation project, which brought several new businesses into the community.

The 1990s promised to be yet another decade of expansion for Sauk Village. In 1990, Carolina Freight opened for business, bringing numerous jobs to the area. Building began in 1993 on the Carolina Subdivision, south of Sauk Trail and east of the Calumet Expressway. This subdivision would be the first residential development in nearly a decade. The 1990 census showed Sauk Village as having a population of 9,704. The 2000 census data showed the population at about 10,411.

2005 saw an investigation into the finances of School District 168 and what was described by the Cook County State's Attorney as the "worst case of financial fraud by a public official." Superintendent of Schools Thomas Ryan, School Board President Louise Morales, and Building and Grounds supervisor Edward Bernacki were all charged with felonies for stealing funds from the school district. Ryan was the only one who was sentenced to a prison term of 8 years. Ryan was released in 2008 after serving more than two years and repaying some $400,000 in restitution to District 168.

Groundbreaking began in August 2007 on the new Sauk Village Municipal Center and Senior Citizen Center. The groundbreaking coincided with the village's 50th anniversary celebrations. Construction took 14 months and was to be paid for not with property tax dollars but from impact fees resulting from the influx of industrial development in the village's Logisticenter, according to Village Manager Dieterich. Because of the national economic downturn by 2012, impact fees generated were not adequate to cover the debt service on the Revenue Bonds issued in 2007 to build the Municipal Center. The Village was forced to levy property taxes to cover the bond payments in 2012, 2013 and 2014. The old Village Hall was taken over by the Police Department.

Water testing began detecting concentrations of vinyl chloride, a known carcinogen, in the communities well water in 2009. The Village took one of the three wells it has off line as concentration levels continued to rise. With the Village stuck in political gridlock and a legal battle with the State of Illinois Environmental Protection Agency, by 2012 the Illinois Attorney General Lisa Madigan stepped in and forced the Village to provide bottled water to the residents until a temporary air strippers were installed to remove the vinyl chloride from the well water. By August 2012 the State of Illinois installed temporary air strippers and the village discontinued providing bottled water. Permanent Air Strippers were on the drawing board in 2012 and construction finally became a reality as the Illinois Environmental Protection Agency approved a low-interest loan of $4.8 million for the village. Construction on the permanent air strippers got under way by spring of 2014 and is expected to be complete by fall, 2014.

On March 12, 2012, voters went to the polls and approved a referendum to abandon the Village's well water in favor of Lake Michigan Water. To date, there has been no plan or timeline provided as to when the Village will transition to Lake Michigan water as "Permanent" air strippers are scheduled to be installed in Fall, 2014. In 2013, as part of the "water improvement plan" upgrades to the Iron Removal System installed in 1988 are to be completed.

== McConathy Public Library ==
A group of avid readers began a volunteer library which was housed in the basement of Katz Corner School, once located on Burnham Avenue. In June 1973, a referendum was passed and the Sauk Village Library District was formed in 1974. Jack Hurwitz was the first library director. He was assisted by Mary Frances Pena, who later would become head librarian.

The library outgrew the basement at Katz Corner School and moved to a single-story house at 1909 Sauk Trail, and Linda Gapsewitz became the new director. In 1984, the library moved to a storefront in Surreybrook Plaza. In 1986, the Sauk Village Library District Board of Trustees changed the district's name to the Nancy L. McConathy Public Library District, to honor library district trustee and Village Clerk Nancy L. McConathy, who had died suddenly.

In 2006, under the direction of the Library Board and Library Director Nanette Wargo, the library finally realized the vision of all of those volunteers and moved into their very own library building. The building was originally envisioned for land once owned on 223rd Street near Torrence Avenue, but was built at 21737 Jeffery Avenue. The building was designed by ARC Architects of Frankfort, Illinois.

== Politics ==
The village's first mayor, then referred to as Village President, was Thomas J. Nichols, who was elected in 1957, when the village was incorporated. Nichols served two terms from 1957 to 1965. He was succeeded by Roger F. Theisen in 1965. During the Theisen administration, the village saw the largest expansion of its geographical boundaries and the largest growth in housing as a result of the baby-boomers moving from the larger urban centers to the more rural Sauk Village. Theisen continued the "bedroom community" character of the community. Theisen had the Village Board change the title of Village President to Mayor but continuing the Village Board system of government. Theisen appointed Theodore "Ted" Theodore as his Executive Assistant, effectively what is now the Village Manager's position. Theodore would serve in that capacity through the next administration.

The village's third mayor, Edward W. Paesel was elected in April 1977, beating out long-time incumbent Roger Theisen. Paesel was a school teacher at the time of his election. During Paesel's time in office the village experienced some growth but still experienced the difficulties of the economic downturn as many blue collar jobs left the area. It wasn't until the late 1980s that some of the largest developments came about. DSI on Torrence Avenue, the expansion of Roadway Express and Carolina Freight, two very successful Tax Increment Financing (TIF) districts, and Pacesetter Steel were all attributed to the vision of Edward Paesel. An ambitious project spearheaded by Paesel which did not come about was the GM-Saturn automobile plant, proposed for the northwest corner of the Calumet Expressway and Sauk Trail. Saturn officials opted for an alternate location. Paesel has remained one of the staunchest advocates for Sauk Village since he was first elected to the Village Board in 1973.

Mark Collins, an iron worker, who was Mayor Paesel's "preferred candidate", won election as a part-time mayor after beating out his one-time ally and colleague trustee Richard Derosier and a crowded field of candidates in April 1989. On April 4, 1989, many Chicago media outlets descended on Sauk Village to cover the election of Joseph Wiszowaty, a high school student who was elected to the Village Board of Trustees, and became the youngest man elected in the state of Illinois. Wiszowaty ran on a "change" platform and would in fact bring that change to the Village Board. Wiszowaty would find himself voting against the administration on many issues during his term in office. Wiszowaty made a presentation to the owners of the Chicago Bears to build a new stadium on the property that was proposed for the GM-Saturn plant, after securing economic commitment to expand the Enterprise Zone from the administration of Chicago Heights. The Bears declined the proposal and opted to stay in Chicago with commitments for a newer more modern stadium. Collins, Wiszowaty and the Board were sworn on May 9, 1989. During Collins' first term as mayor, new housing construction began again after a many-year hiatus. Many of the day-to-day activities that were handled by the mayor were now being handled by the village manager. Wiszowaty served his term from 1989 to 1993, when he challenged incumbent mayor Mark Collins but lost in a three-way race. Wiszowaty was born and raised in Sauk Village and would have been the youngest mayor Sauk Village ever elected had he succeeded. A petition to have Wiszowaty run again for the village board was circulated in 1995 by supporters, which likely would have led to another run for mayor in 1997, but Wiszowaty chose not to seek election to his old seat on the board.

Collins survived his re-election bid for a second term as mayor in April 1993, beating out trustee Joseph Wiszowaty and another candidate, again with the same core of supporters that brought him to office in 1989. In September 1994 the administration was under intense scrutiny over the Community Development Block Grant (CDBG) program. Allegations included contractors doing shoddy work and allowing massive cost overruns on projects, and the village's hiring of unbonded and unlicensed contractors. In December 1994, citing "serious questions" relating to the village's handling of a program to refurbish single-family homes, Cook County suspended the release of grant money to the village for new projects. Shortly afterward, the Cook County State's Attorney began an investigation into the mishandling of the CDBG program and several other blunders by the Collins administration. This would cause supporters of Collins to look for an alternative candidate in 1997.

On April 1, 1997, Collins was defeated by Roger Peckham, his own appointee to the Village Board. Peckham during the 1997 election accused the administration, when it came to dealing with new developments, of jumping at opportunities rather than considering serious planning. Peckham, who was serving as Village Trustee, said that the mayor would not communicate with the Board of Trustees on important matters. Peckham had two very close challenges in the 2001 and in 2005 elections. 2005 saw one of the closest mayoral elections in the village's history, in which Peckham survived with only a 43-vote victory against trustee David Hanks.

Peckham announced in 2008 that he would not seek a fourth term, stating, "The community has moved along during my term." But Peckham also said he had hoped for more economic, retail and housing development in the village. Lewis Tower would win election as Sauk Village's sixth mayor by a 2 to 1 majority over Village Trustee Derrick Burgess in April 2009 and has become the first African-American to serve as mayor.

November 7, 2012, residents of Sauk Village were stunned to hear via email that embattled Mayor Lewis Towers resigned. Towers is the first and only mayor to have resigned the office of Mayor. Towers had been at political odds with the Village Board as the village was stuck in "gridlock". On November 8, 2012, the Village Board of Trustees selected David Hanks as acting mayor to serve out the remainder of Lewis Towers' unexpired term until May 2013. Hanks announced during a press conference he would not seek election as mayor and that he would return to his seat on the Village Board of Trustees as soon as the new mayor takes the oath of office. Hanks then filed to be a candidate for Mayor in December 2012. On April 9, 2013, Hanks won election with 46% of the vote in a 4-way race.

The village hired a Village Manager in 1988. At the time outgoing mayor Edward Paesel said that there was nobody at Village Hall with the experience necessary to run the administrative functions, and the village's mayor's position had been made part-time. Richard Dieterich was hired and continues today as Village Manager. Dieterich relocated to Sauk Village from Nebraska. To date, Dieterich has served under three mayors and numerous trustees, and has provided 20 years of leadership and continuity to Sauk Village to date.

A changing of the guard was said to have taken place in April 1985 when incumbent Village Clerk Agnes Theodore was beaten out at the polls after many years as Village Clerk by Nancy L. McConathy. Theodore, whose husband was the Executive Assistant to the mayor, refused to leave her position, and McConathy filed suit against the mayor, Village Board of Trustees and Agnes Theodore to force Theodore to leave her elected position. Theodore claimed she was not only an elected official but also an employee of the village and the administration did nothing to support McConathy's contention. On April 5, 1986, McConathy collapsed at the village's annual Appreciation Dinner and died just short of serving a full year in office. McConathy's lawsuit brought prior to her death was settled by McConathy's estate some time later, without the village admitting any liability. Prior to her election as Village Clerk, Nancy L. McConathy served as a library trustee. The Sauk Village Library District changed the name of the library's district to the Nancy L. McConathy Public Library District in her honor.

It was "All in the Family" from 1981 until 1983 when Raymond Gavin, who would actually go on to serve as one of the longest serving village trustees (elected to five terms but would resign before the end), and his son David Gavin served on the Village Board together. This has been the only time that a father and son has served on the Village Board together. A father and daughter have served on the Village Board, but not together. Mary Seery (née Slawnikowski) 1993-2005 did not seek re-election to the Village Board in 2005, and that made way for her father James Slawnikowski, who went on to serve one term.

Raymond Gavin (1967–1986) served the longest consecutive time in office as Village Trustee (19 years), and Robert Werner (1971–1987) and Matthew M. Murphy (1957–1973) served as Village Trustees for 16 years in office, all three longer than any mayor of the village. The three men served on the board together from 1971 to 1973. However, the longest serving elected official in Sauk Village history is Agnes Theodore, who served 25 years as Village Clerk from 1960 to 1985. Honors were given to Robert Werner as the baseball park on the north end of the Village were dedicated to his name. Mathew Murphy received a street named in his honor on the east side of town. However, no honors have yet been given to Raymond Gavin, the longest serving Village Trustee.

Harriet Kaminski (née Wiszowaty) made history in 1965, becoming the first woman to become a Village Trustee. She was followed by Alberta Goe (1965–1966), Catherine Moretti (1967–1968), and several other women. Sauk Village currently has two women serving as Village Trustees.

In 2009, Sauk Village elected its first African-American mayor, Lewis Towers, whose slate of candidates under the party banner Citizens for Progress would take office on May 12. After taking office, Towers and the new Village Board found that Sauk Village was facing its worst economic crisis in history with a $2 million budget deficit to plug and no funds in the coffers left over by the previous administration. The new administration saw some shake-ups as well with previous administrative appointees Police Chief Thomas Lachetta and Fire Chief Christopher Sewell retiring and resigning respectively.

Further shakeups in 2010 included Mayor Towers' appointee as Chief of Police Frank Martin, who had the shortest tenure as Police Chief in village history (five months). The Village Board voted 4 to 2 to fire Martin following claims of racial discrimination. Martin, at age 75, the first African-American appointed Police Chief, was accused by several white police officers of mismanagement and holding officers to a higher standard than himself. Also allegedly fired because of the shakeup was the Mayor's Chief of Staff Burnetta Hill-Corely. The Chief of Staff position replaced the Village Manager when Towers was sworn in during 2009.

Mayor Towers sees that times ahead will still be challenging but are "looking up". While the economic recession has hit Sauk Village hard in 2009, the village has managed to work through the challenges.

Between 1990 and 2010 the demographic makeup of Sauk Village has changed from a predominantly white blue collar middle class community to a more racially integrated community. Numerous industrial construction projects which had hoped to bring jobs to the area had been halted in 2008 as one of the worst economic recessions began.

Mayor Derrick Burgess, before his election as Mayor in April 2017 proposed the Burgess Plan for Progress which was what he called the "roadmap toward a Pathway to Progress". The Village Board of Trustees formally adopted his plan as the Strategic Plan for Progress. This was the Village's first Strategic Plan ever adopted by a Village Board. In 2017, the Village applied for and received a grant from the Chicago Metropolitan Agency for Planning to update their old Comprehensive Plan. Teska and Associates was chosen as the consultant for the plan which was completed in 2019.

== Election facts ==
Elections are typically held in early April every 2 years. both Mayoral and Trustee elections happen every 4 years, with Trustee elections happening 2 years out of sync compared to Mayoral Elections.

=== Mayors of Sauk Village ===
Mayors of Sauk Village, Illinois

Image	Mayor	Years	Notes
	Thomas Nichols	1957–1965	First mayor
	Roger Theisen	1965–1977	
	Edward Paesel	1977–1989	
	Mark Collins	1989–1997	
	Roger Peckham	1997–2009	
	Lewis Towers	2009 – November 7, 2012	Resigned on November 7, 2012. First African-American mayor.
	David Hanks	November 8, 2012 – May 2013 (acting); 2013–2017	Appointed acting mayor on November 8, 2012
	Derrick Burgess	2017–2025	Re-elected in 2021. Second African-American mayor.
	Marva Campbell-Pruitt	2025–present	Elected 2025. First woman elected mayor. Third African American mayor. Former village clerk.

=== 2009 Mayoral Election ===
Held on April 7, 2009. Voters elected Lewis Towers over current Village Board Trustee Derrick Burgess by 62% to 37% respectively. Towers went on to become Sauk Village's 6th mayor, and both the first African-American Mayor and the first to have won running on a party affiliation.

=== 2013 Mayoral Election ===
November 7, 2012, Mayor Lewis Towers resigned. Towers is the first and only mayor to have resigned the office of Mayor. Towers had been at political odds with the Village Board as the village was stuck in "gridlock". On November 8, 2012, the Village Board of Trustees selected David Hanks as acting mayor to serve out the remainder of Lewis Towers' unexpired term until May 2013. Hanks announced during a press conference he would not seek election as mayor and that he would return to his seat on the Village Board of Trustees as soon as the new mayor takes the oath of office. Hanks then filed to be a candidate for Mayor in December 2012. The election was held on April 9, 2013, Hanks won the election with 42% of the vote in a 4-way race.

=== 2015 Election ===
Held on April 7, 2015. Derrick Burgess was elected to a 3rd term as Trustee with nearly 62% of the ballot. Also elected were Cecial Tates, a retired Lieutenant-Colonel and former District 168 School Board President along with newcomer Kelvin Jones. This election was historic as two incumbents were not re-elected, an event that had not happened since 1971.

=== 2017 Mayoral Election ===
Held on April 4, 2017. David Hanks announced he would not seek re-election. Hanks followed his predecessor Lewis Towers as only serving one term as Mayor. Village Trustee Derrick Burgess announced his intention to run Mayor of Sauk Village.

Burgess was elected as the 8th Mayor of Sauk Village. Trustee Derrick Burgess was elected with 55% of the vote over two challengers. Burgess took office on May 9, 2017. Marva Campbell-Pruitt was elected Village Clerk beating out two-term incumbent Clerk Debbie Williams. Pruitt is the first to defeat an elected Village Clerk since Nancy McConathy beat out long-time Clerk Agnes Theodore in 1985, and also is the first African-American elected Village Clerk.

=== 2019 Election ===
Held on April 2, 2019. One of the seats on the board of trustees was decided by a coin flip. Both Beth Zupon and Gary T. Bell both received 288 votes. Bell won the coin flip.

=== 2021 Mayoral Election ===
Held on April 6, 2021. Derrick Burgess was Elected for a second consecutive term with 53% of the vote. The other candidates were Debra Williams who received 31% and Lynda Washington who received 15%.

=== 2023 Election ===
Held on April 4, 2023. This election had a 5.6% turnout. All Trustees elected in this election won by default

=== 2025 Mayoral Election ===
Held on April 1, 2025. Marva Campbell-Pruitt was elected Mayor with a plurality of 46% of the vote becoming Sauk Village's first woman mayor. Campbell-Pruitt defeated incumbent Mayor Derrick Burgess who was seeking a third-term as mayor. Arnold Coleman, who chose not to seek re-election as Trustee lost in this three-way race garnering only 15% of the vote.

== Development and growth ==
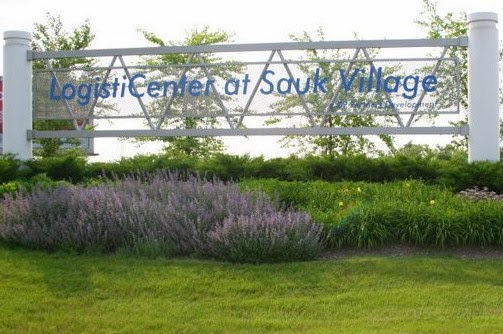
The LogistiCenter at Sauk Village is a 525-acre master planned Industrial/Manufacturing Park offering a Class-1 rail service from Canadian National Railroad. Located within minutes of the City of Chicago along Sauk Trail and Illinois 394

The largest growth of the village came in the early 1990s when the village annexed nearly 1 square mile (2.6 km^{2}) as a result of a major land grab with neighbors Steger and Ford Heights. The size of the annexation was only rivaled by the growth in the early 1960s when the village just began and housing growth was at an all-time high. The largest parcel annexed came in 1991 when 500 acres (2.0 km^{2}) at the northwest corner of Sauk Trail and the Calumet Expressway was finally added to the village. The 500-acre (2.0 km^{2}) parcel was previously proposed for the GM-Saturn plant by Mayor Paesel and the new Chicago Bears Stadium by Trustee Wiszowaty.

Development would finally take off in 2004 when Sauk Village marketed the property to national developers and selected DP Partners out of Reno, Nevada. In November 2004 the company entered into a development agreement with the village. In January 2005, DP Partners closed on the first 100 acres (0.40 km^{2}) and began development two months later. In its master plan, the company plans to spend $150 million to develop 5,000,000 square feet (460,000 m^{2}) of warehouse and manufacturing space. LogistiCenter Business Park currently occupies 325 acres (1.32 km^{2}) and has a 496,260-square-foot (46,104 m^{2}) distribution facility (expandable up to 1.2 million square feet).

Winpak announced it was locating a portion packaging facility in Sauk Village, after purchasing 28.9 acres of land within the LogistiCenter development in 2011, a Class A business park. The 2011 buildout was for 267,000 sqft and in 2016 Winpak completed their planned expansion to a total of 615,000 sqft. Through incentives by the State of Illinois, Cook County and Commonwealth Edison, Winpak was able to remain in Sauk Village.

== Government ==
Sauk Village is governed by an elected six-member Board of Trustees and Mayor. The Mayor/Village President is a "part-time" position and he appoints the Village Administrator, Treasurer, Police Chief, Fire Chief, Public Works Superintendent, all Directors and other Village Department Heads and members of Committees and Commissions with the "advice and consent" of the Village Board of Trustees pursuant to Illinois law.

- Mayor/Village President: Marva Campbell-Pruitt (elected April 1, 2025)
- Village Clerk: Debra Lee Williams (elected April 1, 2025)
- Village Treasurer: Position Vacant

Board of Trustees:

- Aretha Burns (first appointed 2023, elected 2023 term expires 2027)
- Raven Johnson (first elected 2023, term expires 2027)
- Diane Sapp (first elected 2023; elected 2025, term expires 2029)
- Tyesha Jones (first elected 2025; term expires 2029)
- Michelle Sterling (first elected 2025; term expires 2029)
- Vacant Seat (unexpired term, expires 2027)

Village Trustees are part-time positions, and they currently earn $125 per meeting that they attend.

Sauk Village is also serviced by the Bloom Township Board of Trustees, Nancy L. McConathy Library District and Consolidated School District 168, Bloom Township High School District 206 and Prairie State College Board of Trustees. All of these bodies have elective offices

All of Sauk Village is in Illinois' 2nd congressional district.

== Mayors of Sauk Village ==
1. Thomas J. Nichols (1957–1965)
2. Roger F. Theisen (1965–1977)
3. Edward W. Paesel (1977–1989)
4. Mark J. Collins (1989–1997)
5. Roger G. Peckham (1997–2009)
6. Lewis Towers (2009–2012)
7. David A. Hanks (2012–2017)
8. Derrick N. Burgess (2017–2025)
9. Marva Campbell-Pruitt (2025–Present)

== Notable people ==
- Jeff Allen, an actor and Christian comedian
- Cory Hardrict, an actor
- Jan Johnson, a former athlete who competed mainly in the pole vault
- Star Bandz, a rapper
