= Bloom Trail High School =

Location
- 22331 Cottage Grove Avenue; Steger, Illinois 60411; United States; 41.484237°N 87.594752°W

Information
- School type: Public Comprehensive Secondary
- Opened: 1964
- Status: Open
- Closed: No
- School district: Bloom Twp. HS 206
- Superintendent: Lenell Navarre
- Principal: Angela Patrick
- Teaching staff: 74.26 (FTE)
- Grades: 9–12
- Gender: Coed
- Enrollment: 1,218 (2024–2025)
  - Grade 9: 332 students
  - Grade 10: 357 students
  - Grade 11: 240 students
  - Grade 12: 289 students
- Average class size: 23
- Student to teacher ratio: 16.40
- Area: South Suburbs
- Campus type: Suburban
- Colors: Navy Blue; Vegas Gold
- Slogan: Go Blazing Trojans!
- Athletics conference: Southland Athletic Conference
- Mascot: Trail Blazer
- Team name: Bloom Township Blazing Trojans
- Rival: Crete-Monee; Thornton
- Newspaper: "The Bloom Trail Express"
- Website: bloomtrail.org

Bloom Trail High School is a public high school in Steger, Illinois, a south suburb of Chicago, in the United States. It is part of Bloom Township High School District 206. Originally the Bloom Township Freshman-Sophomore Division, in 1976 it became a four-year high school and was renamed Bloom Trail High School. Sports for both Bloom High School and Bloom Trail High School are combined since 1995. Football, volleyball, basketball, track, games/practices are held at Bloom Trail.

== Academics ==
The average composite ACT score at the school is 18. The class of 2017 set a record for the number of students (33) who passed the PSAE, which allows the students to go to the local community college, Prairie State College, to take college courses.

== Attendance area ==
Bloom Trail High School serves the communities of Steger, Sauk Village, Crete, South Chicago Heights, Ford Heights, a small portion of Chicago Heights, and parts of Lynwood. The following schools feed into Bloom Trail High School: Columbia Central Middle School (Steger), Rickover Jr. High School (Sauk Village), and Cottage Grove Middle School (Ford Heights).
