= Ford Heights, Illinois =

- Village
- Flag Seal

- Location of Ford Heights in Cook County, Illinois.

- Location within Chicago metropolitan area Location within Illinois Location within the United States
- Coordinates: 41°30′33″N 87°35′17″W
- Country: United States
- State: Illinois
- County: Cook
- Township: Bloom
- Incorporated: 1949

Government
  - Mayor: Freddie Wilson

Area
  - Total: 1.95 sq mi (5.04 km^{2})
  - Land: 1.95 sq mi (5.04 km^{2})
  - Water: 0 sq mi (0.00 km^{2}) 0%

Population (2020)
  - Total: 1,813
  - Density: 931.5/sq mi (359.65/km^{2})

Standard of living (2007–11)
  - Per capita income: $12,217
  - Median home value: $80,200
- ZIP code(s): 60411
- Area code(s): 708
- Geocode: 26710
- FIPS code: 17-26710
- Website: villageoffordheights.org

Ford Heights (formerly East Chicago Heights) is a village in Cook County, Illinois, United States. The population was 1,813 at the 2020 census. A suburb of Chicago, many of the area's first settlers were African American and since its incorporation in 1949, the village has remained predominantly Black. Due to the lack of commercial activity and financial stability, the village has declined over the years. Urban renewal efforts were attempted in the 1960s, although the village has continued to decline.

== History ==
The area that would eventually become Ford Heights was first settled in the late 1840s. It served as a stopping point on the Underground Railroad for runaway slaves fleeing to freedom. By the early 20th century, the area had developed into an agricultural community of farms operated mostly by Poles, Lithuanians, and Italians. After World War I, African Americans from the Southern U.S. migrated to the area and worked on the farms.

A new subdivision known as the "Park Addition" was created on a farm road from Chicago Heights to Indiana, and it attracted residents to the area during the early 1920s. In 1924, 40 families successfully petitioned for electrical service. Soon after, the main east–west road became a two-lane concrete highway designated as U.S. Route 30, part of the transcontinental Lincoln Highway. By the 1930s, the Park Addition had telephone service and was known as East Chicago Heights. During the 1940s, Alberta Armstrong and others organized both black and white women in the community to raise funds for a new fire truck. By 1948, they had become the East Chicago Heights Citizens Association.

East Chicago Heights was incorporated as a village in 1949. The first mayor was Charlie Williams. In the 1950 census, 1,548 people lived in the village – 76.9% of whom were black. The Ford Motor Company opened a stamping plant adjacent to the village in 1956. The company offered minorities an equal opportunity for well-paying jobs, and East Chicago Heights developed into a blue-collar community inhabited mostly by middle-class black families whose housing choices in suburban Chicago were severely limited at that time. The village's population more than doubled to 3,270 by 1960. That growth continued throughout the decade, with one of the biggest successes being the Sunnyfield subdivision, which opened in 1964 and became one of the most popular neighborhoods in East Chicago Heights.

Towards the end of the 1960s, over 60 acres (24 ha) of housing deemed substandard were cleared and replaced by federally subsidized public housing. These developments attracted lower income residents to East Chicago Heights, which strained the village's resources, already limited by little commercial activity and a small tax base. The population rose to 5,000 in 1970 and peaked at 5,347 in 1980. In an attempt to annex the unincorporated site of the Ford Stamping Plant, the village of East Chicago Heights changed its name to Ford Heights in 1987. The move was unsuccessful, and the land eventually was annexed by the neighboring city of Chicago Heights.

Often viewed as one of Chicago's most impoverished suburbs and at one point the poorest suburb in the United States, Ford Heights has experienced high levels of political corruption, decaying infrastructure, and an elevated crime rate. In 2008, the Cook County Sheriff's Department took over law enforcement duties for the village. Between 1980 and 2020, the population of Ford Heights declined by more than 66%.

== Geography ==
Ford Heights is located at 41°30′33″N 87°35′17″W.

According to the 2021 census gazetteer files, Ford Heights has a total area of 1.95 square miles (5.05 km^{2}), all land. The village lies on the edge of the Tinley Moraine.

=== Surrounding areas ===
Glenwood
Chicago Heights Lynwood
Chicago Heights Lynwood
Chicago Heights Sauk Village
Sauk Village

== Demographics ==
Historical population
Census	Pop.	Note	%±
1950	1,548		—
1960	3,270		111.2%
1970	5,000		52.9%
1980	5,347		6.9%
1990	4,259		−20.3%
2000	3,456		−18.9%
2010	2,763		−20.1%
2020	1,813		−34.4%
U.S. Decennial Census; 2010 2020

=== Racial and ethnic composition ===
Ford Heights, Illinois – Racial and ethnic composition Note: the US Census treats Hispanic/Latino as an ethnic category. This table excludes Latinos from the racial categories and assigns them to a separate category. Hispanics/Latinos may be of any race.
Race / Ethnicity (NH = Non-Hispanic)	Pop 2000	Pop 2010	Pop 2020	% 2000	% 2010	% 2020
White alone (NH)	47	40	44	1.36%	1.45%	2.43%
Black or African American alone (NH)	3,296	2,635	1,651	95.37%	95.37%	91.06%
Native American or Alaska Native alone (NH)	1	6	7	0.03%	0.22%	0.39%
Asian alone (NH)	3	3	4	0.09%	0.11%	0.22%
Pacific Islander alone (NH)	0	0	0	0.00%	0.00%	0.00%
Other race alone (NH)	1	0	3	0.03%	0.00%	0.17%
Mixed race or Multiracial (NH)	21	37	37	0.61%	1.34%	2.04%
Hispanic or Latino (any race)	87	42	67	2.52%	1.52%	3.70%
Total	3,456	2,763	1,813	100.00%	100.00%	100.00%

=== 2020 census ===
As of the 2020 census, Ford Heights had a population of 1,813 and a population density of 931.65 inhabitants per square mile (359.71/km^{2}). The median age was 35.6 years. 28.2% of residents were under the age of 18 and 15.3% of residents were 65 years of age or older. For every 100 females there were 90.2 males, and for every 100 females age 18 and over there were 88.6 males age 18 and over.

100.0% of residents lived in urban areas, while 0.0% lived in rural areas.

There were 611 households in Ford Heights, of which 37.8% had children under the age of 18 living in them. Of all households, 20.5% were married-couple households, 27.0% were households with a male householder and no spouse or partner present, and 47.6% were households with a female householder and no spouse or partner present. About 28.1% of all households were made up of individuals and 10.5% had someone living alone who was 65 years of age or older.

There were 692 housing units at an average density of 355.60 per square mile (137.30/km^{2}), of which 11.7% were vacant. The homeowner vacancy rate was 3.8% and the rental vacancy rate was 6.4%.

=== Income and poverty ===
The median income for a household in the village was $37,083, and the median income for a family was $40,082. Males had a median income of $22,263 versus $33,819 for females. The per capita income for the village was $17,494. About 36.9% of families and 37.8% of the population were below the poverty line, including 66.2% of those under age 18 and 18.1% of those age 65 or over.

== Government ==
Ford Heights is in Illinois's 2nd congressional district.

=== Mayors of Ford Heights ===
Mayors of Ford Heights, Illinois

Number	Image	Mayor	Years	Notes
1		Charlie (Charley) Williams †	1949–1952	First mayor of East Chicago Heights Elected January 11, 1949, to a 4-year term Died February 2, 1952, while in office. Special election held in April 1952.
2		Theodore McMillan	1952–1953; 1953–1957; 1957–1961	Won special election to complete term of Mayor Williams; Won election in April 1953 to a full term
3		Luvert Listenbee	1961–1965; 1965–1969; 1969–1973	
4		Saul Beck (1st term)	1973–1977; 1977–1981; 1981–1985; 1985–1989	
5		Gloria Bryant	1989–1993	
(4)		Saul Beck (2nd term)	1993–1997; 1997–2001; 2001–2005; 2005–2009	
6		Charles R. Griffin (1st term)	2009–2017	
7		Annie Coulter	2017–2021	
(6)		Charles R. Griffin (2nd term)	May 5, 2021 – September 25, 2024	Resigned effective September 25, 2024 after conviction for corruption.
8		Freddie Wilson	September 28, 2024 – May 7, 2025 (Acting); May 7, 2025 –	Acting mayor from September 28, 2024; Won election as an independent candidate in the April 1, 2025 general election defeating former mayor Annie Coulter and Trustee Antonia McMichaels.

== Education ==
Public education in the village of Ford Heights is provided by Ford Heights School District 169 and Bloom Township High School District 206: Ford Heights School District 169 operates two campuses: Medgar Evers Primary Academic Center (grades PK-4) and Cottage Grove Upper Grade Center (grades 5-8). High school students in Ford Heights attend Bloom Trail High School, which is part of Bloom Township High School District 206.

== Transportation ==
Pace provides bus service on routes 357 and 358 connecting Ford Heights to Chicago Heights and other destinations across the Southland.
