= Glenwood, Illinois =

- Village
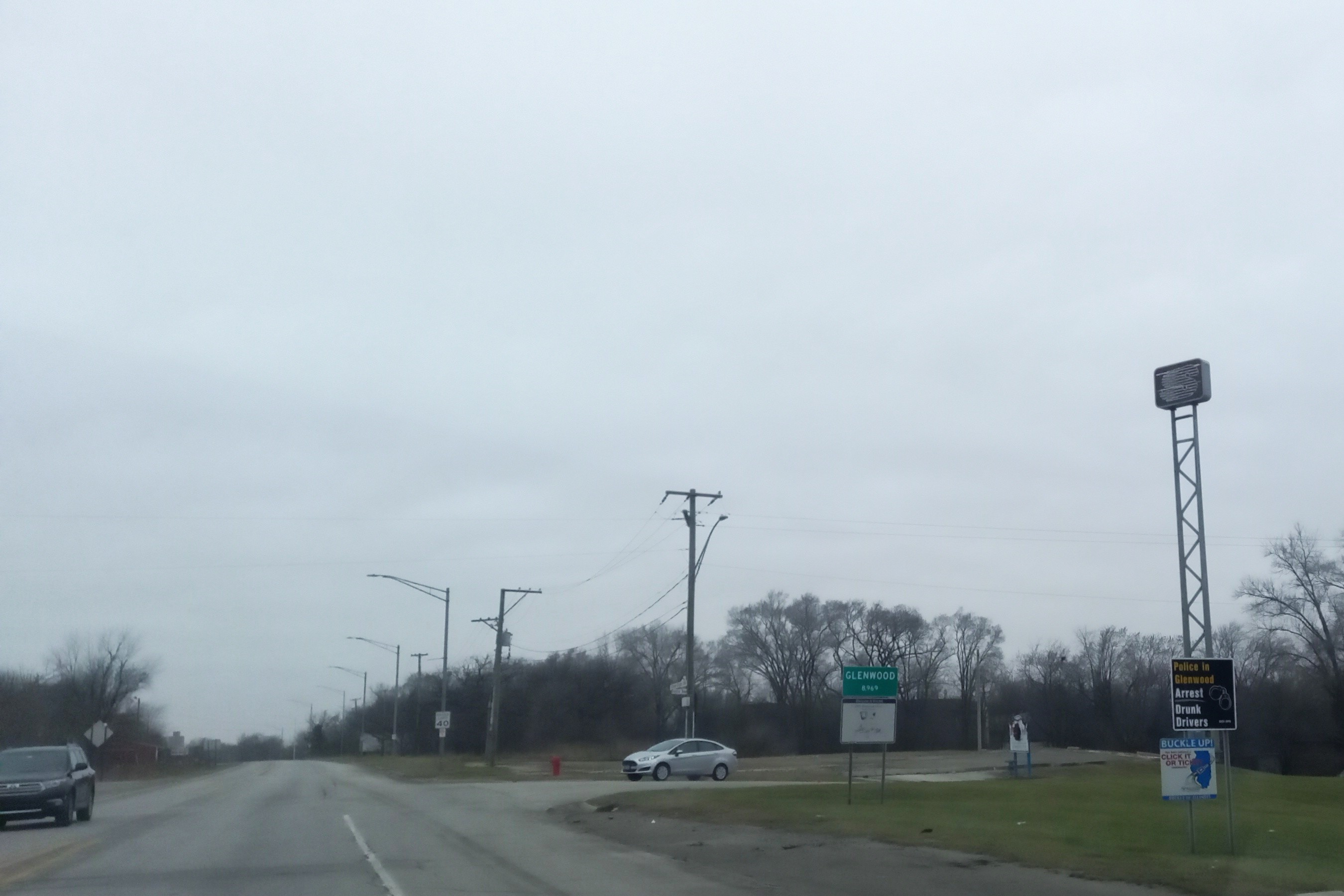
- Glenwood population sign at Glenwood-Dyer Road

- Seal

- Location of Glenwood in Cook County, Illinois.

- Location within Chicago metropolitan area Location within Illinois Location within the United States
- Coordinates: 41°32′42″N 87°36′43″W
- Country: United States
- State: Illinois
- County: Cook
- Townships: Thornton, Bloom
- Incorporated: 1903

Government
  - Mayor: Mayor Toleda Hart

Area
  - Total: 3.26 sq mi (8.45 km^{2})
  - Land: 3.26 sq mi (8.45 km^{2})
  - Water: 0 sq mi (0.00 km^{2}) 0%

Population (2020)
  - Total: 8,662
  - Density: 2,653.6/sq mi (1,024.57/km^{2})

Standard of living (2007-11)
  - Per capita income: $27,205
  - Median home value: $161,000
- ZIP code(s): 60425
- Area code(s): 708
- Geocode: 30029
- FIPS code: 17-30029
- Website: villageofglenwood.com

Glenwood is a village in Cook County, Illinois, United States. The population was 8,662 at the 2020 census. It is a south suburb of Chicago.

== Geography ==
Glenwood is located at 41°32′42″N 87°36′43″W (41.544943, -87.612052).

Glenwood has a total area of 3.26 square miles (8.44 km^{2}), all land.

The Glenwood Shoreline, an ancient shoreline of Lake Chicago, is within the village. The village is almost completely surrounded by forest preserves, as is the nearby village of Thornton.

The neighboring villages are Homewood to the west, Thornton to the north, Lynwood to the east, and Ford Heights and Chicago Heights to the south.

== Demographics ==
Historical population
Census	Pop.	Note	%±
1910	581		—
1920	738		27.0%
1930	603		−18.3%
1940	643		6.6%
1950	762		18.5%
1960	882		15.7%
1970	7,416		740.8%
1980	10,538		42.1%
1990	9,289		−11.9%
2000	9,000		−3.1%
2010	8,969		−0.3%
2020	8,662		−3.4%
U.S. Decennial Census; 2010 2020

=== Racial and ethnic composition ===
Glenwood, Illinois – Racial and ethnic composition Note: the US Census treats Hispanic/Latino as an ethnic category. This table excludes Latinos from the racial categories and assigns them to a separate category. Hispanics/Latinos may be of any race.
Race / Ethnicity (NH = Non-Hispanic)	Pop 2000	Pop 2010	Pop 2020	% 2000	% 2010	% 2020
White alone (NH)	4,399	2,186	1,240	48.88%	24.37%	14.32%
Black or African American alone (NH)	3,983	5,909	6,457	44.26%	65.88%	74.54%
Native American or Alaska Native alone (NH)	5	10	4	0.06%	0.11%	0.05%
Asian alone (NH)	56	27	9	0.62%	0.30%	0.10%
Pacific Islander alone (NH)	9	8	3	0.10%	0.09%	0.03%
Other race alone (NH)	11	20	30	0.12%	0.22%	0.35%
Mixed race or Multiracial (NH)	85	144	201	0.94%	1.61%	2.32%
Hispanic or Latino (any race)	452	665	718	5.02%	7.41%	8.29%
Total	9,000	8,959	8,662	100.00%	100.00%	100.00%

=== 2020 census ===
As of the 2020 census, Glenwood had a population of 8,662. The median age was 42.0 years. 21.1% of residents were under the age of 18 and 19.0% of residents were 65 years of age or older. For every 100 females there were 79.9 males, and for every 100 females age 18 and over there were 75.9 males age 18 and over.

100.0% of residents lived in urban areas, while 0.0% lived in rural areas.

There were 3,259 households in Glenwood, including 2,016 families. Of those households, 31.6% had children under the age of 18 living in them. Of all households, 35.6% were married-couple households, 15.7% were households with a male householder and no spouse or partner present, and 43.3% were households with a female householder and no spouse or partner present. About 27.5% of all households were made up of individuals and 13.1% had someone living alone who was 65 years of age or older.

The population density was 2,653.80 inhabitants per square mile (1,024.64/km^{2}). There were 3,480 housing units at an average density of 1,066.18 per square mile (411.65/km^{2}). Of all housing units, 6.4% were vacant. The homeowner vacancy rate was 3.3% and the rental vacancy rate was 8.0%.

=== Income and poverty ===
The median income for a household in the village was $64,857, and the median income for a family was $73,571. Males had a median income of $42,135 versus $33,824 for females. The per capita income for the village was $25,949. About 8.2% of families and 11.3% of the population were below the poverty line, including 17.9% of those under age 18 and 10.1% of those age 65 or over.

== Government ==
Glenwood is in Illinois's 2nd congressional district.

== Education ==
Elementary schools in Glenwood include Longwood Elementary School, Hickory Bend Elementary School, Brookwood Middle School, and Brookwood Junior High School. Half of Glenwood is served by Bloom High School, and the other half is served by Homewood-Flossmoor High School. There is also a private school, Glenwood Academy (formerly called Glenwood School for Boys and Glenwood School for Boys and Girls).

== Places of worship ==
There are 6 churches: St. Andrews Church, St. John Catholic Church, Impact Church, Calvary Baptist Church of Glenwood, Glenwood Bible Church, and Living Springs Church.

== Transportation ==
Pace provides bus service on routes 352 and 890 along Halsted Street connecting Glenwood to destinations across the Southland.

== Notable residents ==
- Seun Adigun (born 1987), bobsledder, track and field runner
- Kenneth Choi (born 1971), actor
- Casey Driessen (born 1978), bluegrass fiddler, singer, and educator
- Brian Gassaway (1972–2021), mixed martial artist and coach
- Tai Odiase (born 1995), basketball player in the Israeli Basketball Premier League
- Bayo Ojikutu (born 1971), novelist and university lecturer
