= Chicago Heights School District 170 =

School district in Illinois, United States

Address
- 30 W 16th Street Chicago Heights, Illinois, 60411; United States

District information
- Type: Public
- Grades: PreK–8
- NCES District ID: 1709960

Students and staff
- Students: 2,690

Other information
- Website: www.sd170.com

Chicago Heights School District 170 (CHSD170 or SD170) is a school district headquartered in Chicago Heights, Illinois.

== History ==
In 1901, the Board of Education decreed that the school day would run from 9:00 a.m. – 12 noon, and from 1:00 p.m. – 4:00 p.m. with a 15-minute recess each session. On July 30, 1903, the first telephone in School District 170 was placed in the office of the Superintendent of Schools at a cost of $18 per year. In May 1907, School District 170 students collected money for victims of the San Francisco earthquake. On October 1, 1908, telephones were ordered for Garfield and Franklin Schools, the first schools to have access to "this marvel of communication". In 1912, the Board of Education decreed that non-resident students "shall pay tuition in advance, at the rate of $2 per month" and required all its teachers to live in the district. In December 1912, the Board of Education voted to authorize a reward of $10 for "evidence that will convict any parties who willfully deface or destroy school property." In 1913, School District 170 served 2,238 students. In January 1917, the Board of Education authorized the installation of electric gongs in three schools. In January 1917, the Board of Education endorsed a nationwide "Plan for Preparedness", setting aside specific times for girls and boys to drill under the supervision of a member of the National Guard. From October 22 to November 14, 1917, District 170 schools were closed because of an influenza outbreak.

In 1919, the average enrollment of students per classroom was 44; in 1953, the average enrollment of students per classroom was 30; and in 2002, the average enrollment of students per classroom was 20.

In 1953, School District 170 served 2,833 students, and in 2004 the district served 3,550 students.

Dollie Helsel retired as superintendent in 2007. Tom Amadio, an alumnus of Bloom High School and formerly the assistant superintendent of Chicago Heights district, became the superintendent in 2007.

On February 4, 2021, the district used a gymnasium as a vaccination center so its staff could be vaccinated and therefore facilitate the district reopening during the COVID-19 pandemic in Illinois.

== Schools ==
Middle school

- Chicago Heights Middle School - Its current middle school facility had its groundbreaking in 2018 and it was scheduled to open in 2020. It had a cost of $40,000,000.

Elementary schools

- Garfield Elementary School
- Grant Elementary School
- Greenbriar Elementary School
- Jefferson Elementary School
- Kennedy Elementary School
- Lincoln Elementary School
- Roosevelt Elementary School
- Washington/McKinley Elementary School
- Wilson Elementary School

Preschool

- Early Childhood Program
