= Chicago Heights, Illinois =

- City
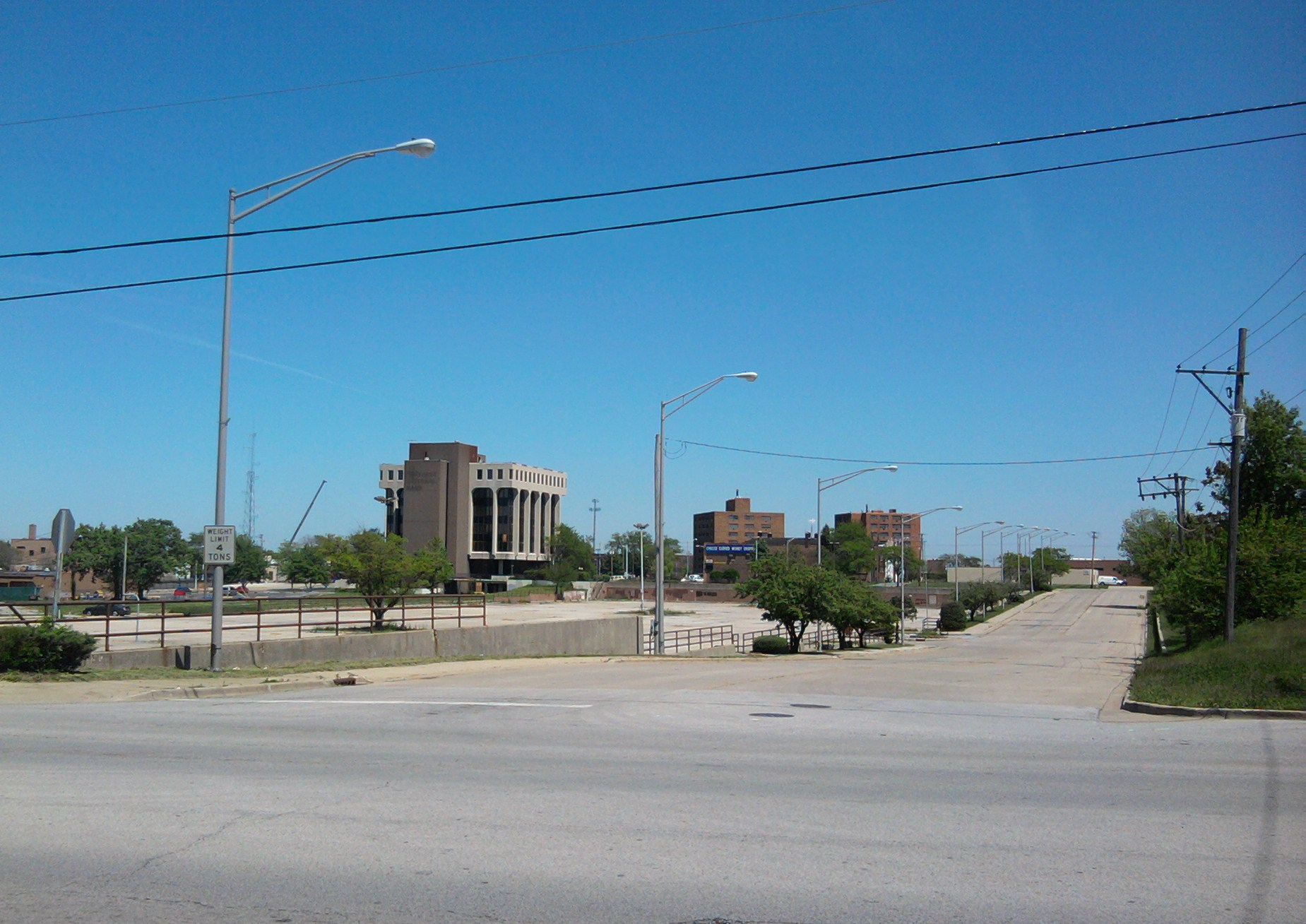
- Looking east across Chicago Road

- Flag Seal
- Nickname(s): "The Crossroads of the Nation" and "Da Heights"
- Motto: Crossroads of the Nation
- Interactive map of Chicago Heights, Illinois
- Coordinates: 41.510684°N 87.634069°W
- Country: United States
- State: Illinois
- County: Cook
- Township: Bloom
- Established: Early 1890s
- Incorporated as a village: 1892
- Incorporated as a city: 1900

Government
  - Type: Council–manager
  - Mayor: David A. Gonzalez
  - City Council: Renee Smith; Sonia Perez; Wanda Rodgers; Christopher Baikauskas; George Brassea; Vincent J. Zaranti; Kelli Merrick

Area
  - Total: 10.380 sq mi (26.884 km^{2})
  - Land: 10.367 sq mi (26.851 km^{2})
  - Water: 0.013 sq mi (0.034 km^{2}) 0.13%
- Elevation: 653 ft (199 m)

Population (2020)
  - Total: 27,480
  - Estimate (2024): 26,533
  - Density: 2,651/sq mi (1,023/km^{2})
- Time zone: UTC−6 (Central (CST))
  - Summer (DST): UTC−5 (CDT)
- ZIP Codes: 60411, 60412
- Area codes: 708 and 464
- FIPS code: 17-14026
- GNIS feature ID: 2393512
- Website: cityofchicagoheights.org

Chicago Heights is a city in Cook County, Illinois, United States. The population was 27,480 at the 2020 census, and was estimated at 26,533 in 2024. A southern suburb in the Chicago metropolitan area, its nicknames include "The Crossroads of the Nation" and "Da Heights”.

== History ==
The first recorded settlement by non-native Americans of the area that would become Chicago Heights occurred in 1833 when Absalom Wells built a cabin on the ridge above Thorn Creek. By the 1840s, a small rural community known as Thorn Grove had been formed, centered around a Presbyterian church.

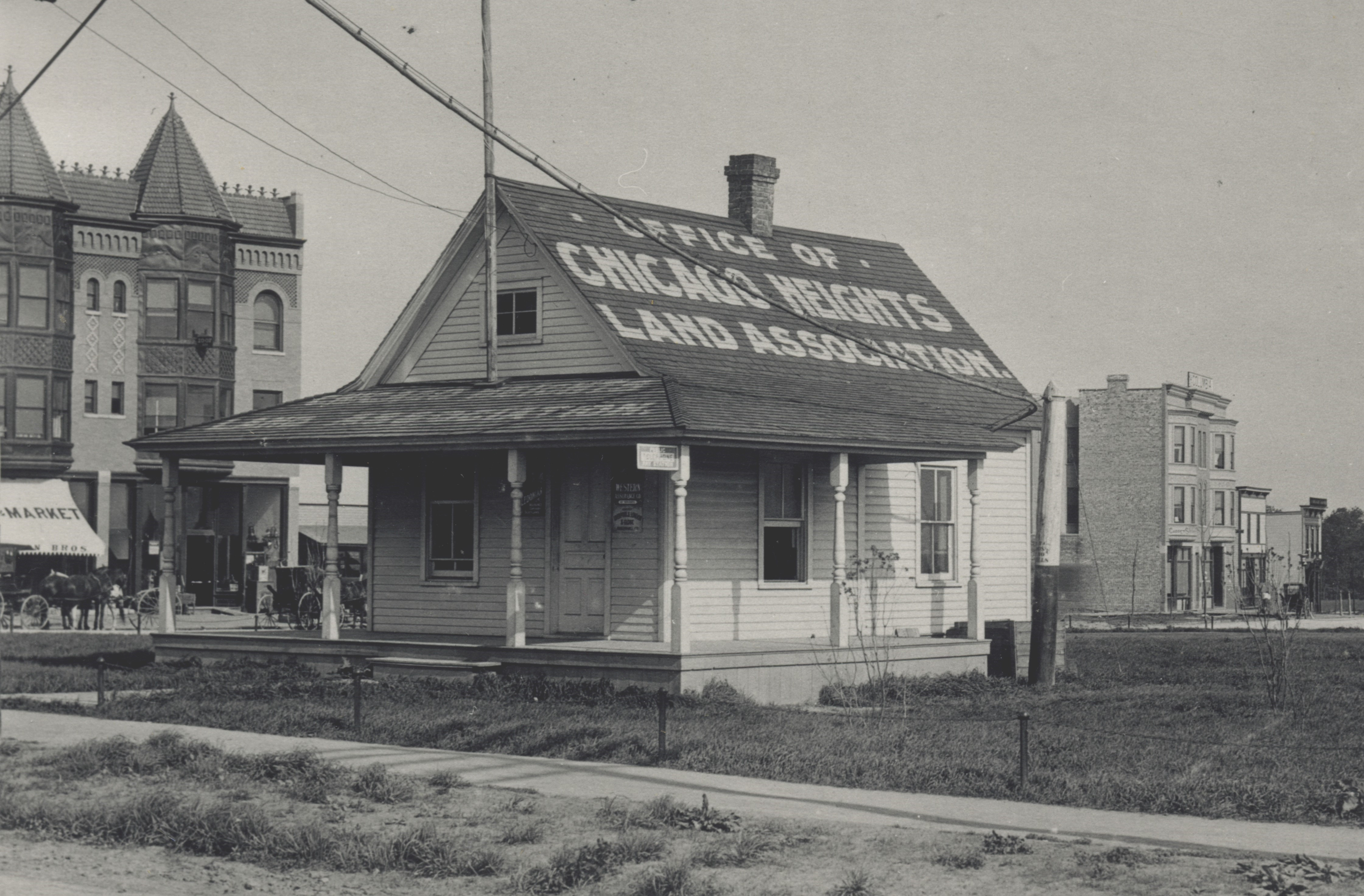
Office of the Chicago Heights Land Association in the 1890s

In the 1890s, a group of Chicago developers led by Charles Wacker formed the Chicago Heights Land Association to create an outer-ring industrial suburb of Chicago. They convinced many businesses to construct factories in the new development, including Inland Steel, the Owens-Illinois Glass Company, and the Ludowici Roofing Tile Company, among many others.

The newly-created factories and plants drew large numbers of Italian, Polish, Slovak, Lithuanian, Irish, and Black American workers to the East Side and Hill neighborhoods. A downtown area formed and became a center of activity for the surrounding region. In 1916, the Lincoln Highway Association was persuaded to route the country's first transcontinental highway through the city, leading the community to be dubbed "the crossroads of the nation."

During the Prohibition era, the city was home to many bootleggers. Al Capone was a frequent presence, and criminal bootlegging operations employed many area runners, sugar buyers, and plumbers. Period newspaper accounts placed the value of locally-produced alcohol during the 1925-1929 period at $35 million.

During the Great Depression the area was hard-hit due to its large industrial presence. World War II drove production in local factories essential for the war effort, which led to a resurgence in area prosperity during the 1950s. A Ford stamping factory created during that decade helped further the area. The area declined economically during the 1970s as heavy manufacturing scaled down or left the region.

== Geography ==
Chicago Heights lies on the high land of the Tinley Moraine, with the higher and older Valparaiso Moraine lying just to the south of the city.

According to the United States Census Bureau, the city has a total area of 10.380 square miles (26.88 km^{2}), of which 10.367 square miles (26.85 km^{2}) is land and 0.013 square miles (0.034 km^{2}) (0.13%) is water.

The city's major crossroads are at Dixie Highway (Illinois Route 1) and Lincoln Highway (U.S. Route 30).

Chicago Heights is about 30 miles (48 km) south of the Chicago Loop.

=== Surrounding communities ===
Homewood / Glenwood
Flossmoor Glenwood
Olympia Fields Ford Heights
Park Forest Sauk Village
South Chicago Heights

== Demographics ==
Historical population
Census	Pop.	Note	%±
1900	5,100		—
1910	14,525		184.8%
1920	19,653		35.3%
1930	22,321		13.6%
1940	22,461		0.6%
1950	24,551		9.3%
1960	34,331		39.8%
1970	40,900		19.1%
1980	37,026		−9.5%
1990	33,072		−10.7%
2000	32,776		−0.9%
2010	30,276		−7.6%
2020	27,480		−9.2%
2024 (est.)	26,533		−3.4%
U.S. Decennial Census; 2020 Census

=== Racial and ethnic composition ===
Chicago Heights, Illinois – racial and ethnic composition Note: the US Census treats Hispanic/Latino as an ethnic category. This table excludes Latinos from the racial categories and assigns them to a separate category. Hispanics/Latinos may be of any race.
Race / ethnicity (NH = non-Hispanic)	Pop. 1980	Pop. 1990	Pop. 2000	Pop. 2010	Pop. 2020
White alone (NH)	22,163 (59.86%)	16,516 (49.94%)	12,062 (36.80%)	7,062 (23.33%)	4,438 (16.15%)
Black or African American alone (NH)	10,558 (28.52%)	11,406 (34.49%)	12,305 (37.54%)	12,370 (40.86%)	11,487 (41.80%)
Native American or Alaska Native alone (NH)	17 (0.05%)	35 (0.11%)	48 (0.15%)	44 (0.15%)	30 (0.11%)
Asian alone (NH)	126 (0.34%)	92 (0.28%)	138 (0.42%)	87 (0.29%)	74 (0.27%)
Pacific Islander alone (NH)	—	—	4 (0.01%)	8 (0.03%)	23 (0.08%)
Other race alone (NH)	27 (0.07%)	47 (0.14%)	39 (0.12%)	51 (0.17%)	103 (0.37%)
Mixed race or multiracial (NH)	—	—	390 (1.19%)	400 (1.32%)	611 (2.22%)
Hispanic or Latino (any race)	4,135 (11.17%)	4,976 (15.05%)	7,790 (23.77%)	10,254 (33.87%)	10,714 (38.99%)
Total	37,026 (100.00%)	33,072 (100.00%)	32,776 (100.00%)	30,276 (100.00%)	27,480 (100.00%)

=== 2020 census ===
As of the 2020 census, Chicago Heights had a population of 27,480, with 9,261 households and 6,454 families residing in the city.

The median age was 35.5 years. 26.5% of residents were under the age of 18 and 14.4% were 65 years of age or older. For every 100 females there were 92.5 males, and for every 100 females age 18 and over there were 88.4 males age 18 and over.

All residents lived in urban areas, while none lived in rural areas.

Of the 9,261 households, 38.1% had children under the age of 18 living in them. Of all households, 34.3% were married-couple households, 19.8% were households with a male householder and no spouse or partner present, and 38.5% were households with a female householder and no spouse or partner present. About 25.8% of all households were made up of individuals and 10.4% had someone living alone who was 65 years of age or older.

The population density was 2,672.37 inhabitants per square mile (1,031.8/km^{2}). There were 10,663 housing units at an average density of 1,036.95 per square mile (400.4/km^{2}), of which 13.1% were vacant. The homeowner vacancy rate was 4.0% and the rental vacancy rate was 13.3%.

Racial composition as of the 2020 census
Race	Number	Percent
White	5,784	21.0%
Black or African American	11,678	42.5%
American Indian and Alaska Native	348	1.3%
Asian	83	0.3%
Native Hawaiian and Other Pacific Islander	35	0.1%
Some other race	6,416	23.3%
Two or more races	3,136	11.4%
Hispanic or Latino (of any race)	10,714	39.0%

=== 2023 American Community Survey ===
As of the 2023 American Community Survey, there are 9,209 estimated households in Chicago Heights with an average of 2.84 persons per household. The city has a median household income of $57,479. Approximately 24.7% of the city's population lives at or below the poverty line. Chicago Heights has an estimated 52.0% employment rate, with 20.2% of the population holding a bachelor's degree or higher and 84.9% holding a high school diploma. There were 10,799 housing units at an average density of 1,041.67 per square mile (402.2/km^{2}).

=== Housing market ===
According to realtor website Zillow, the average price of a home as of October 31, 2025, in Chicago Heights is $167,101.

=== Languages ===
The top five reported languages (people were allowed to report up to two languages, thus the figures will generally add to more than 100%) were English (67.2%), Spanish (29.5%), Indo-European (2.3%), Asian and Pacific Islander (0.3%), and Other (0.6%).

=== 2000 census ===
As of the 2000 census, there are 32,776 people, 10,703 households, and 7,823 families residing in the city. The population density was 1,322.3 inhabitants per square mile (510.5/km^{2}). There were 11,444 housing units at an average density of 461.7 per square mile (178.3/km^{2}). The racial makeup of the city is 45.02% White, 37.90% African American, 0.45% Native American, 0.44% Asian, 0.04% Pacific Islander, 13.46% from other races, and 2.70% from two or more races. Hispanic or Latino people of any race were 23.77% of the population.

There were 10,703 households, out of which 38.1% had children under the age of 18 living with them, 45.0% were married couples living together, 22.3% had a female householder with no husband present, and 26.9% were non-families. 22.9% of all households are made up of individuals, and 9.7% had someone living alone who was 65 years of age or older. The average household size was 3.00 and the average family size was 3.53.

In the city the population was spread out with 31.6% under the age of 18, 10.2% from 18 to 24, 28.0% from 25 to 44, 18.3% from 45 to 64, and 11.8% who were 65 years of age or older. The median age was 31 years. For every 100 females there were 94.8 males. For every 100 females age 18 and over, there were 89.7 males.

The median income for a household in the city was $36,958, and the median income for a family was $42,681. Males had a median income of $34,207 versus $26,276 for females. The per capita income for the city was $14,963. 17.5% of the population and 13.7% of families were below the poverty line, including 24.5% were under the age of 18 and 9.9% are 65 or older.

== Government ==
=== Mayors of Chicago Heights ===
Mayors of Chicago Heights, Illinois

Image	Mayor	Years	Notes
	John Becker	1892-1894	1st Village President
	James C. Ross	1894-1896	
	G. C. Flanner	1896-1898	
	A. J. J. Miller	1898-1899	
	Frank Fellows	1899-1900	
	John W. Thomas	1900-1903	1st City Mayor
	Jerry C. Mote	1903-1905	
	Lee H. Hook	1905-1909	
	Jerry C. Mote	1909-1911	
	W. H. Holte	1911-1913	
	Lee H. Hook	1913-1915	
	Craig A. Hood	1915-1919	
	Ellis G. Klingler	1919-1921	
	John E. Thomas	1921-1927	Son of John W. Thomas
	Daniel P. Bergin	1927-1935	
	Joseph Gannon	1935-1947	
	Maurino R. Richton	1947-1951	
	Carl W. McGehee	1951-1959	
	Lawrence A. Schramm	1959	
	Charles J. Grupp	1959-1962	
	William O. Ritter	1962-1963	
	Maurino R. Richton	1963-1971	
	George R. Bonick	1971-1975	
	Charles L. Panici	1975-1991	
	Douglas M. Troiani	1991-1995	
	Angelo A. Ciambrone	1995-2003	
	Anthony J. DeLuca	2003-2009	
	Alex Lopez	2009-2010	1st Hispanic Mayor
	Vincent J. Zaranti	2010-2011	Interim Mayor
	David A. Gonzalez	2011-Present	

== Education ==
=== Schools ===
Chicago Heights School District 170 operates twelve schools, with a student population of 3,600. Highland is the district's preschool for children aged three and four; Garfield, Grant, Greenbriar, Jefferson, Kennedy, Lincoln, Roosevelt, Washington-McKinley, and Wilson are neighborhood schools that serve students from kindergarten through fifth grade. After elementary school/5th grade, students attend Chicago Heights Middle School for grades 6–8.

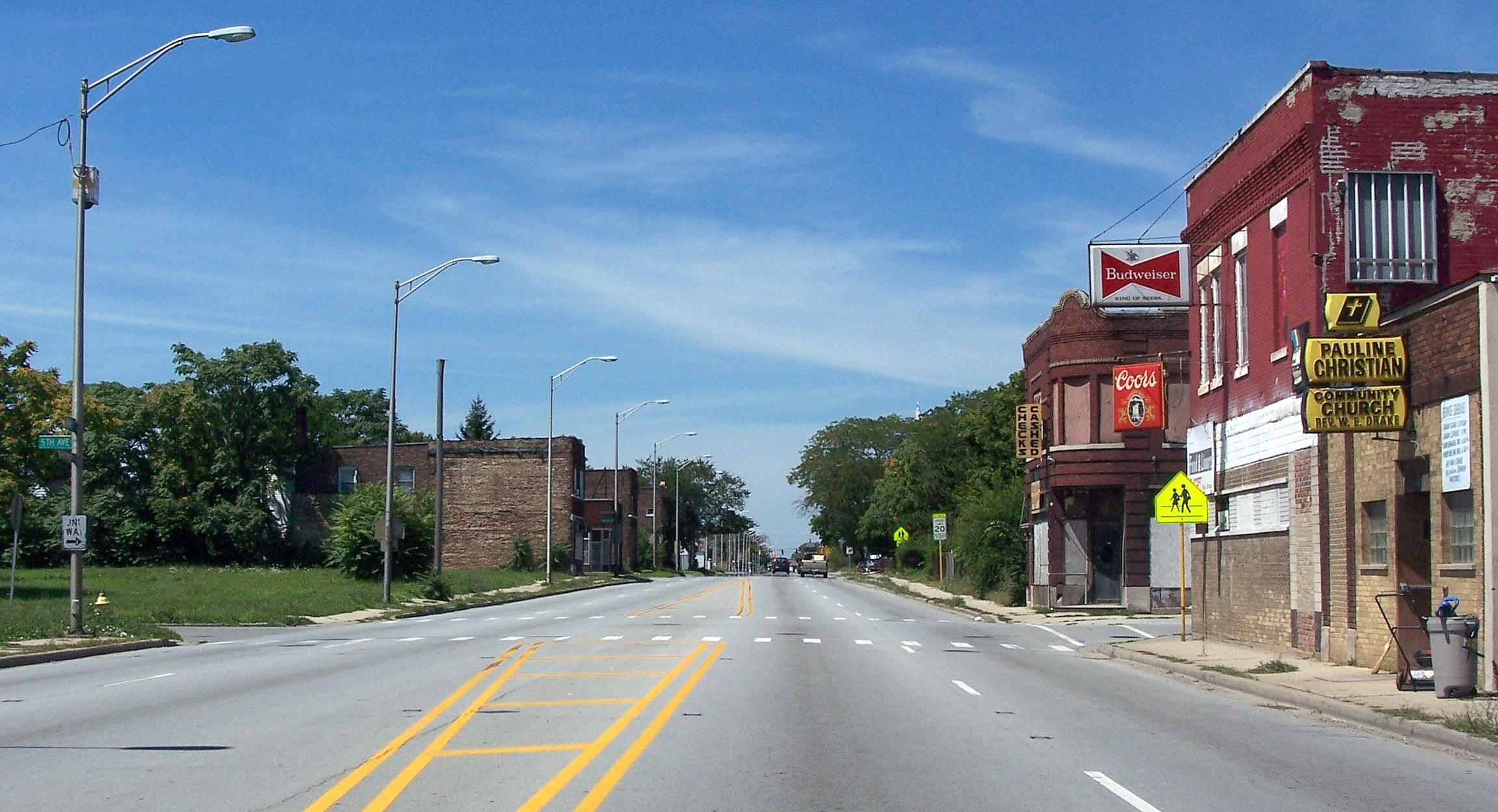
US 30 in Chicago Heights

Chicago Heights is home to Bloom High School, which all students of District 170 attend after 8th grade, and Bloom Trail High School, which shares its athletic programs with Bloom. Many students from neighboring communities including Steger, South Chicago Heights, Ford Heights, Sauk Village and Glenwood attend high school at Bloom.

Parts of Chicago Heights are included in Flossmoor School District 161 which includes Serena Hills Elementary School in Chicago Heights. After Serena, students attend Parker Jr. High School—also a part of Flossmoor School District 161. Only some students who complete middle school at Parker Jr. High School move on to Homewood-Flossmoor High School; the remainder attend Bloom High School.

Parts of Chicago Heights are also served by Park Forest – Chicago Heights School District 163, and Beacon Hill Primary Center is located in the Beacon Hill neighborhood. After Beaker, students attend Michelle Obama School of Arts and Technology for middle school (6–8). Students from this neighborhood attend Rich Township High School, part of Rich Township High School District 227.

Marian Catholic High School, affiliated with the Roman Catholic Archdiocese of Chicago, is a private high school located in the city.

Prairie State College is a community college located in Chicago Heights.

St. Agnes School is a private Catholic school located in Chicago heights.

=== Public library ===
On May 20, 1901, many Chicago Heights residents signed a petition asking for the mayor and aldermen to select a board of directors that would be responsible for founding and running a free public library in Chicago Heights. On June 28, 1901, the first library board members were sworn in, including Sam W. Lea, F.W. Schact, W.E. Canady, James Bowie, David Wallace, Joseph Caldwell, C.W. Salisbury, A.J. Sorensen, and A.W. McEldowney. The library was opened in a small room in the new city building on February 20, 1902. That month, the library board wrote to industrialist Andrew Carnegie seeking funds to build a library building in Chicago Heights. In July, the board was notified that Carnegie had proposed $15,000 toward the cost of a library building as long as the city could provide a free site for the building and if the council could promise $1,500 a year to keep the library running. The Carnegie Library in Chicago Heights was designed by Richard E. Schmidt. The library was located at 1627 Halsted Street and opened on September 11, 1903, with a staff of two and 1,643 volumes. A bigger library was eventually needed, and on August 5, 1972, the present building at 15th Street and Chicago Road was opened. The Chicago Heights Free Public Library was a million-dollar building that opened with 60,000 books, records, and other materials.

== Economy ==
Chicago Heights was once home to several major industrial concerns, including the Thrall Car Manufacturing Company, a manufacturer of freight cars, run for many years by chief executive officer Richard L. Duchossois. The city was also the original home of the Inland Steel Company.

Ford Motor Company operates a metal stamping plant located along Lincoln Highway in Chicago Heights. This facility produces automobile body panels that are shipped to Ford's Chicago Assembly plant approximately 15 miles (24 km) to the north in the Hegewisch community area of Chicago.

== Infrastructure ==
=== Transportation ===
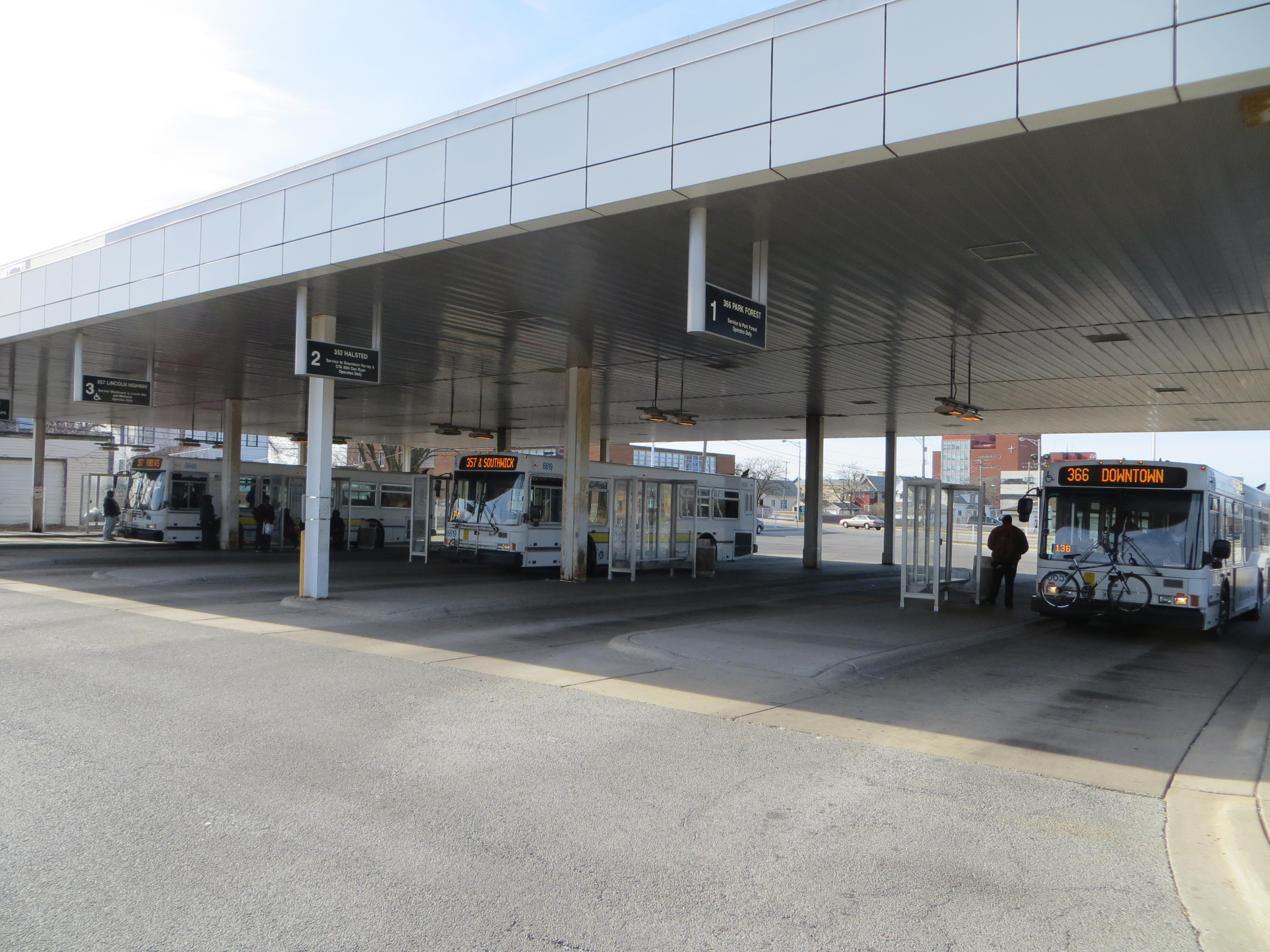
Pace Chicago Heights bus terminal

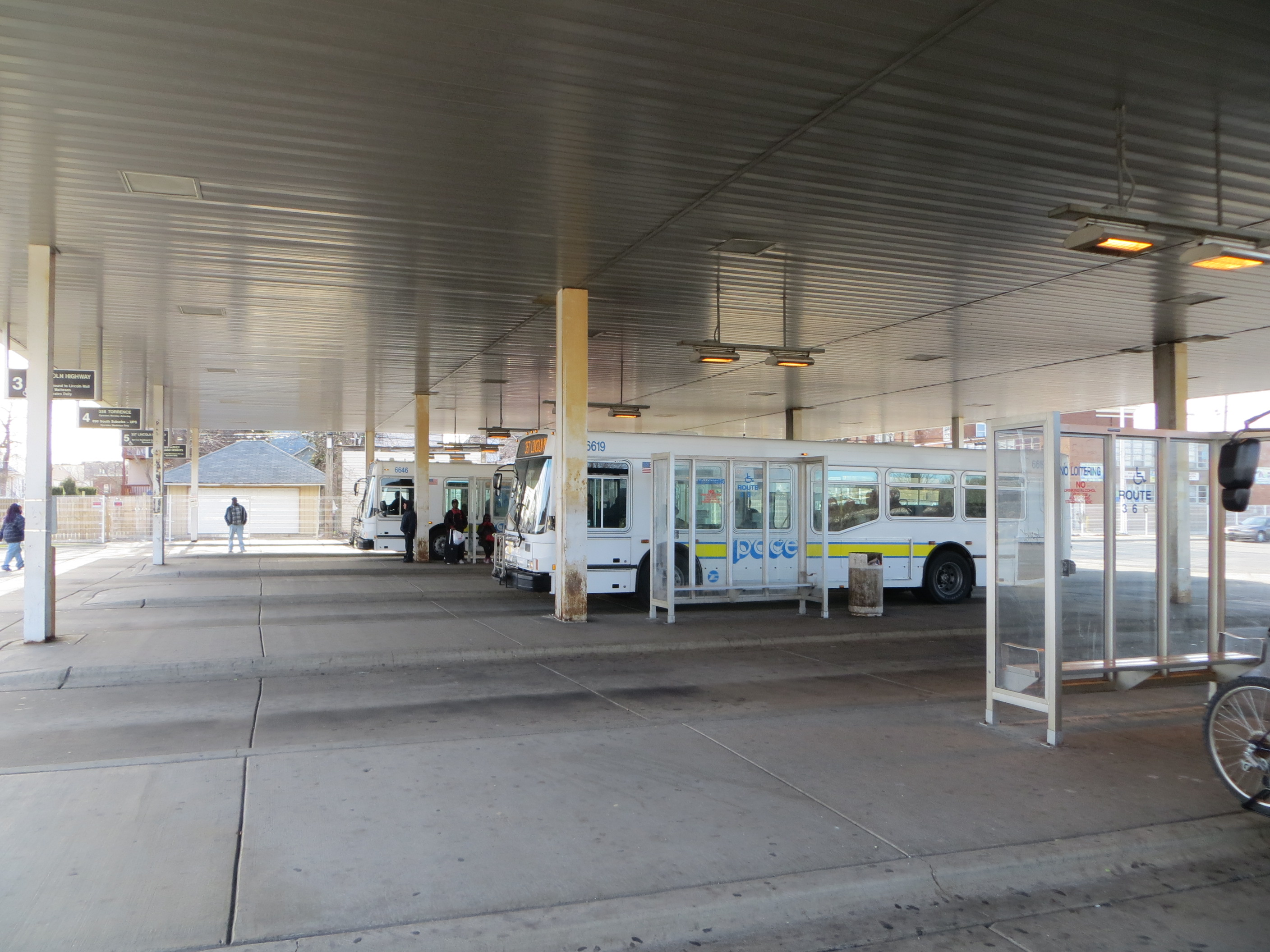
Pace Chicago Heights bus terminal

Chicago Heights is served by six Pace bus routes and the Pace Chicago Heights Terminal. Chicago Heights will be served by Metra's SouthEast Service on a Corridor which has not seen Commuter rail since 1935.

=== Healthcare ===
There was a Well Group Clinic (part of St. James) located on Dixie Highway. Well Group was previously known as Suburban Heights Medical Center. There are also two Aunt Martha's health centers in Chicago Heights.

In September 2018, St. James Hospital closed after more than 100 years.

== Notable people ==
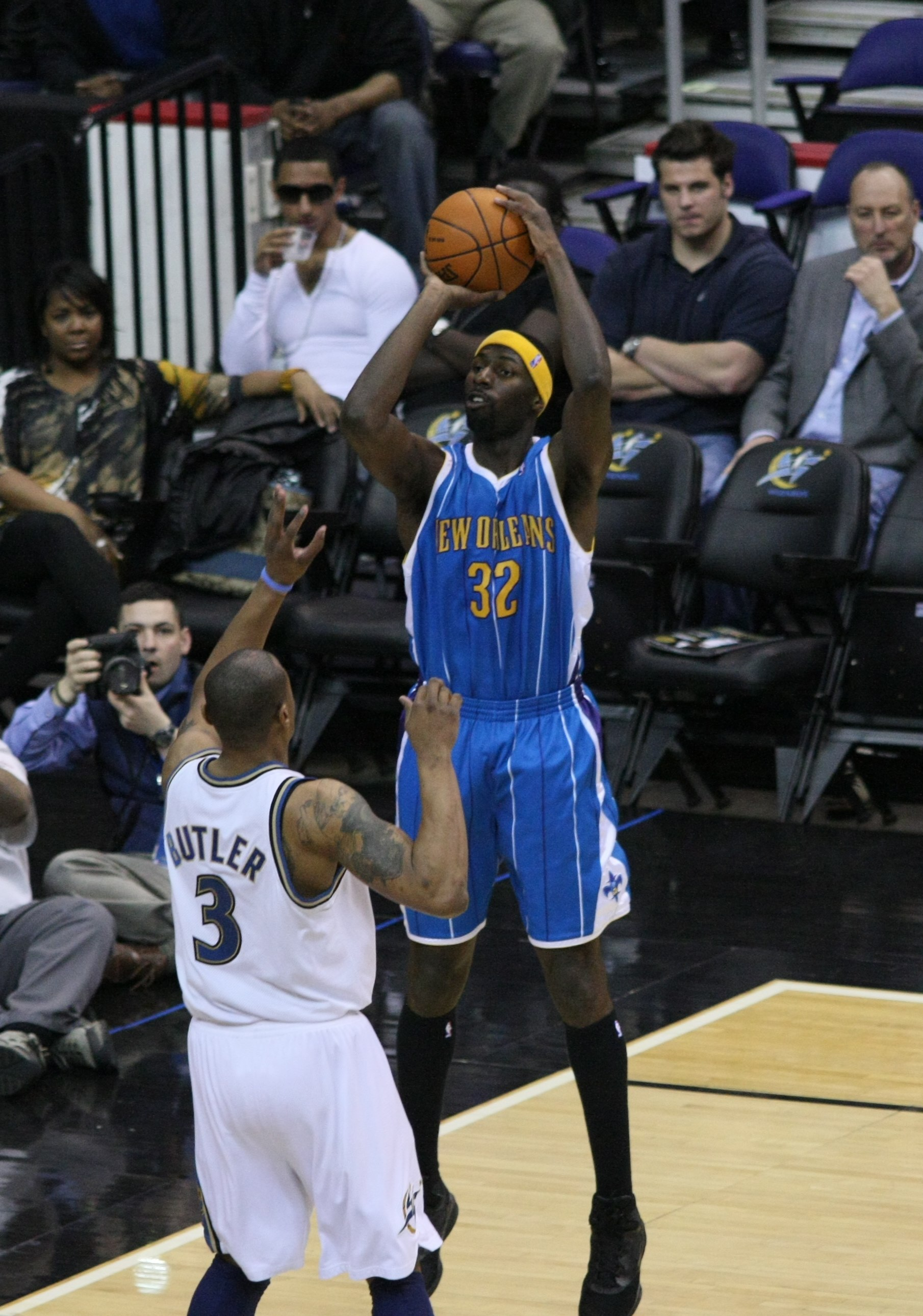
Julian Wright

- Don Bacon, U.S. representative for Nebraska
- Paris Barclay, television producer and director, Sons of Anarchy; president of Directors Guild of America
- Jim Bouton, pitcher for New York Yankees, Seattle Pilots, Houston Astros, and Atlanta Braves; pitched in 1963 and 1964 World Series; author of Ball Four
- David Broder, Pulitzer Prize-winning political columnist (The Washington Post)
- Don Brumm, defensive lineman with NFL's St. Louis Cardinals and Philadelphia Eagles
- Luke Butkus, lineman and coach for University of Illinois; assistant coach Seattle Seahawks, Jacksonville Jaguars
- Jerry Colangelo, chairman of USA Basketball, owned Phoenix Suns and Arizona Diamondbacks, chairman of NBA's Philadelphia 76ers, 2007 inductee in Basketball Hall of Fame
- Eddie Condon, jazz musician
- Darlene Conley, actress, portrayed Sally Spectra from 1988 to 2007 on The Bold and the Beautiful
- Aldo DeAngelis, Illinois state senator and businessman
- Jon Debus, Major League Baseball coach
- Anthony DeLuca, mayor, state representative
- Mike Downey, sports columnist with Los Angeles Times and Chicago Tribune
- Rube Ehrhardt, MLB pitcher for Brooklyn Robins and Cincinnati Reds
- Tom Erikson, amateur wrestler and mixed martial artist
- Joe Farrell, jazz saxophonist
- Wally Flager, shortstop for Cincinnati Reds and Philadelphia Phillies
- Matt Fraction, writer for Marvel Comics
- Joe Gentile, author and publisher
- Phil Guy, blues guitarist
- Debbie Halvorson, U.S. Representative, 2009–11
- Robert P. Hanrahan, U.S. Representative, 1973–75
- Rodney Harrison, safety for San Diego Chargers and New England Patriots, two-time Super Bowl champion; NFL television analyst
- Craig Hodges, NBA shooting guard, two-time champion Chicago Bulls (1991, '92)
- John Holecek, linebacker for NFL's Buffalo Bills
- Irene Hughes, psychic, television personality
- Leroy Jackson, 3-time 100-yard dash state champion 1956–58, Washington Redskins running back
- Jan Johnson, pole vaulter, 3-time NCAA champion, bronze medalist at 1972 Summer Olympics in Munich
- Nancy Kaszak, state representative
- Dennis Kelly, offensive tackle with NFL's Philadelphia Eagles and Tennessee Titans
- Tim Kelly, assistant coach, Houston Texans and Tennessee Titans
- Todd Krygier, left wing for NHL's Hartford Whalers, Washington Capitals and Anaheim Ducks
- Audie Matthews, captain of University of Illinois basketball team, 1976–78
- Ernie McMillan, 15-year offensive lineman for NFL's St. Louis Cardinals
- Johnny Mince, clarinetist, played with Glenn Miller, Tommy Dorsey and other big bands
- John Mosca, decorated US Army soldier; restaurateur of Mosca's in Louisiana
- Michael O'Hare, actor
- Charles Panici, city's mayor, imprisoned 1993–2001
- Johnny Pate, jazz musician and music producer
- Ted Pawelek, catcher for Chicago Cubs
- Mark Pfeil, pro golfer
- Bret Prinz, pitcher for Arizona Diamondbacks, New York Yankees, Los Angeles Angels, and Chicago White Sox
- Mike Prior, defensive back for Tampa Bay Buccaneers, Indianapolis Colts, and Green Bay Packers, NFL champion (Super Bowl XXXI)
- Shonda Rhimes, television creator, writer and producer, Scandal, Grey's Anatomy, How to Get Away with Murder
- Maurino Richton, lawyer, Illinois, state representative, and mayor of Chicago Heights
- Bret Saberhagen, pitcher for Kansas City Royals, New York Mets, Colorado Rockies, and Boston Red Sox; 1985 World Series champion and Cy Young Award winner
- Olayinka Sanni, basketball player for WNBA's Phoenix Mercury
- Allen R. Schindler Jr., murdered U.S. sailor
- John F. Stossel, consumer reporter with Fox News, investigative journalist
- Brian Timpone, conservative businessman, former TV reporter (KDLH CBS 3) and media entrepreneur
- Ted Uhlaender, outfielder for Minnesota Twins, Cleveland Indians, and Cincinnati Reds
- Tyler Ulis, basketball player for Kentucky and NBA's Phoenix Suns
- Lloyd Walton, point guard for Marquette and the Milwaukee Bucks
- Tom Wieghaus, catcher for Houston Astros and Montreal Expos
- Oscar Lawton Wilkerson, pilot
- Julian Wright, small forward for Kansas, two NBA teams, and several European teams
- Anna Irwin Young, mathematician was born here
- Bryant Young, 4-time All-Pro defensive tackle for San Francisco 49ers and Super Bowl XXIX champion; Pro Football Hall of Fame
- Walter Young, wide receiver for Pittsburgh Steelers
- Bart Zeller, catcher for St. Louis Cardinals, minor-league manager and coach

== Sister cities ==
Chicago Heights has four sister cities. They are:

- Asuogyaman District, Ghana
- Cedral, San Luis Potosí, Mexico
- Wadowice, Lesser Poland Voivodeship, Poland
- San Benedetto del Tronto, Ascoli Piceno, Marche, Italy
