= Jan Johnson =

American pole vaulter (1950–2025)

Personal information
- Born: November 11, 1950 Hammond, Indiana, U.S.
- Died: February 23, 2025 (aged 74) Atascadero, California, U.S.
Medal record
Men's Athletics
Representing the United States
Olympic Games
Bronze medal – third place	1972 Munich	Pole vault
Pan American Games
Gold medal – first place	1971 Cali	Pole vault

Jan Johnson (November 11, 1950 – February 23, 2025) was an American athlete who competed mainly in the pole vault. He graduated in 1972 from the University of Alabama, where he holds the school record in the pole vault at 18 feet 0.5 inches (5.499 m). Johnson was born in Hammond, Indiana.

He competed for the United States in the 1972 Summer Olympics held in Munich, Germany, where he won the bronze medal.

Johnson held a world indoor record at 17 feet 7 inches (5.36 m) while competing for the University of Kansas. He transferred to Alabama, where he became a three-time NCAA champion. He won the 1971 USA Outdoor Track and Field Championships for the Alabama Crimson Tide. He was also a long jumper and sprinter in both high school and college.

Johnson won the 1968 Illinois state high school championship while competing at Bloom High School in Chicago Heights, Illinois. In 1972, the gymnasium of Rickover Junior High School in Sauk Village, Illinois was dedicated and named in his honor. His younger brother Tim Johnson, set the National HS indoor record of 16 feet 7 inches (5.05 m) in 1974. His daughter, Chelsea, became a two-time NCAA outdoor champion in the pole vault for UCLA. Chelsea was silver medalist for the U.S. in the women's pole vault at the 2009 World Championships in Athletics in Berlin.

Jan Johnson ran "Sky Jumpers," a pole vault camp based on the central coast of California. Johnson also hosted auxiliary "Sky Jumpers" camps annually in Illinois, Ohio, Pennsylvania, and Wisconsin. Johnson was an outspoken innovator and advocate for pole vault safety. He co-authored The Illustrated History of the Pole Vault, published in 2007. His second book: "The High Flyer and the Cultural Revolution" was published and received positive reviews.

Johnson died in Atascadero, California, on February 23, 2025, at the age of 74. His daughter Chelsea Johnson was also a professional pole vaulter.
