= Ed Scheiwe =

American basketball and baseball player

Personal information
- Born: February 25, 1918 Steger, Illinois, U.S.
- Died: June 19, 1997 (aged 79) Duluth, Georgia, U.S.
- Listed height: 5 ft 11 in (1.80 m)
- Listed weight: 175 lb (79 kg)

Career information
- High school: Bloom (Chicago, Illinois)
- College: Wisconsin (1939–1942)
- Playing career: 1943–1945
- Position: Shooting guard / small forward

Career history
- 1943–1944: Oshkosh All-Stars
- 1944–1945: Chicago American Gears

Career highlights
- NCAA champion (1941)

Edward John Scheiwe (February 25, 1918 – June 19, 1997) was an American professional basketball and minor league baseball player. In basketball, he played for the Oshkosh All-Stars and Chicago American Gears in the National Basketball League between 1943 and 1945. He averaged 2.8 points per game. In baseball, he played for the Milwaukee Brewers (American Association; 1944), Kansas City Blues (1944), St. Paul Saints (1945), Mobile Bears (1945), and the Oklahoma City Indians (1946).
