= Leroy Jackson =

American football player (born 1939)

No. 22
- Position: Halfback

Personal information
- Born: December 8, 1939 (age 86); Chicago Heights, Illinois, U.S.
- Listed height: 6 ft 0 in (1.83 m)
- Listed weight: 198 lb (90 kg)

Career information
- High school: Bloom (Chicago Heights)
- College: Western Illinois
- NFL draft: 1962: 1st round, 11th overall pick
- AFL draft: 1962: 2nd round, 14th overall pick

Career history
- Washington Redskins (1962–1963)

Awards and highlights
- First-team Little All-American (1961)

Career NFL statistics
- Rushing yards: 142
- Rushing average: 2.7
- Receptions: 10
- Receiving yards: 253
- Receiving touchdowns: 1
- Stats at Pro Football Reference

Leroy Jackson (born December 8, 1939) is an American former professional football player who was a halfback for the Washington Redskins of the National Football League (NFL). He was among the first black players to play for the Redskins in 1962, who were the last NFL team to racially integrate.

== Career ==
Jackson was the Illinois state champion in the 100-yard dash three years in a row for Bloom High School from 1956 to 1958.

He played college football for the Western Illinois Leathernecks and is a member of the school's Athletic Hall of Fame. He was a first-round NFL draft pick of the Cleveland Browns, the 11th player selected in the 1962 draft. He was among the first black players to play for the Redskins in 1962, who were the last NFL team to racially integrate. He was also an All-American sprinter for the Western Illinois Leathernecks track and field team.

On December 8, 1962, his 23rd birthday, Jackson caught an 85-yard touchdown pass for the Redskins from quarterback Norm Snead in a 34–21 loss to the Baltimore Colts. Jackson, along with Bobby Mitchell, was traded by the Browns to the Washington Redskins in exchange for Ernie Davis in 1962.

== Personal life ==
Jackson is Catholic.
