= Luke Butkus =

American football player and coach (born 1979)

Green Bay Packers
- Title: Offensive line coach

Personal information
- Born: June 26, 1979 (age 47); Steger, Illinois, U.S.
- Listed height: 6 ft 3 in (1.91 m)
- Listed weight: 291 lb (132 kg)

Career information
- Position: Center
- High school: Bloom Trail (Chicago Heights, Illinois)
- College: Illinois
- NFL draft: 2002: undrafted

Career history

Playing
- Chicago Bears (2002)*; San Diego Chargers (2002–2003)*; Rhein Fire (2003); Cologne Centurions (2004); Houston Texans (2004)*
- * Offseason or practice squad member only

Coaching
- Oregon (2005–2006) Graduate assistant; Chicago Bears (2007–2009) Offensive assistant & assistant offensive line coach; Seattle Seahawks (2010–2011) Offensive quality control & offensive line coach; Illinois (2012) Offensive line coach; Jacksonville Jaguars (2013–2015) Assistant offensive line coach; Illinois (2016–2018) Offensive line coach; Green Bay Packers (2019–2021) Assistant offensive line coach; Green Bay Packers (2022–present) Offensive line coach

Awards and highlights
- Third-team All-American (2001); Second-team All-Big Ten (2001)

Lucas J. Butkus (born June 26, 1979) is an American football coach and former center who is the offensive line coach for the Green Bay Packers of the National Football League (NFL). He previously served as an assistant coach for the Illinois Fighting Illini, Jacksonville Jaguars, Seattle Seahawks and the Oregon Ducks.

Butkus played college football at the University of Illinois and was signed by the Chicago Bears as an undrafted free agent in 2002. He has also played for the Rhein Fire, San Diego Chargers and Cologne Centurions.

== Playing career ==
Pre-draft measurables
| Height | Weight |
|---|---|
| 6 ft 2 7/8 in (1.90 m) | 291 lb (132 kg) |
All values from Pro Day

He attended training camp with the Bears in 2002 and the San Diego Chargers in 2003. Butkus also played center for the Rhein Fire (2003) and Cologne Centurions (2004) of NFL Europe. He attended Bloom Trail High School in Chicago Heights, Illinois and the University of Illinois.

== Coaching career ==
=== Oregon ===
In 2005, Butkus began his coaching career at the University of Oregon as a graduate assistant coach. He would serve in this position until 2006.

=== Chicago Bears ===
In 2007, Butkus was hired by the Chicago Bears as an offensive assistant and assistant offensive line coach under head coach Lovie Smith.

While the announcement that the tenure of quality control coaches Butkus and Charles London would end came on the same day as the public learned that several Bears' offensive coaches would be fired, leading to speculation that London and Butkus were fired for performance issues, the team would later clarify that the quality control coaches were signed to contracts set to expire after the 2009/10 season, regardless of the team's final standing.

=== Seattle Seahawks ===
On February 1, 2010, Butkus was hired by the Seattle Seahawks as their assistant offensive line coach under head coach Pete Carroll.

=== Illinois ===
In 2012, joined his alma mater, the University of Illinois under head coach Tim Beckman.

=== Jacksonville Jaguars ===
In 2013, Butkus was hired by the Jacksonville Jaguars as their assistant offensive line coach under head coach Gus Bradley.

=== Illinois (second stint) ===
In 2016, Butkus returned to the University of Illinois as their offensive line coach, reuniting with head coach Lovie Smith.

=== Green Bay Packers ===
On February 7, 2019, Butkus was hired by the Green Bay Packers as their assistant offensive line coach under head coach Matt LaFleur.

On January 30, 2022, Butkus was promoted to offensive line coach following Adam Stenavich's promotion to offensive coordinator.

== Personal life ==
Butkus is the nephew of Pro Football Hall of Fame linebacker Dick Butkus.
