= Wally Flager =

American baseball player (1921–1990)

- Shortstop
- Born: November 3, 1921; Chicago Heights, Illinois
- Died: December 16, 1990 (aged 69); Keizer, Oregon
- Batted: Left Threw: Right

MLB debut
- April 17, 1945, for the Cincinnati Reds

Last MLB appearance
- August 8, 1945, for the Philadelphia Phillies

MLB statistics
- Batting average: .241
- Home runs: 2
- Runs batted in: 21
- Stats at Baseball Reference

Teams
- Cincinnati Reds (1945); Philadelphia Phillies (1945)

Walter Leonard Flager (November 3, 1921 – December 16, 1990) was a professional baseball player. He was a shortstop for one season (1945) with the Cincinnati Reds and Philadelphia Phillies. For his career, he compiled a .241 batting average in 220 at-bats, with two home runs and 21 runs batted in.

He was born in Chicago Heights, Illinois and attended Bloom High School there. Flager died in Keizer, Oregon at the age of 69.
