= Oscar Lawton Wilkerson =

Tuskegee Airman (1926–2023)

2nd Lieutenant Oscar Lawton Wilkerson
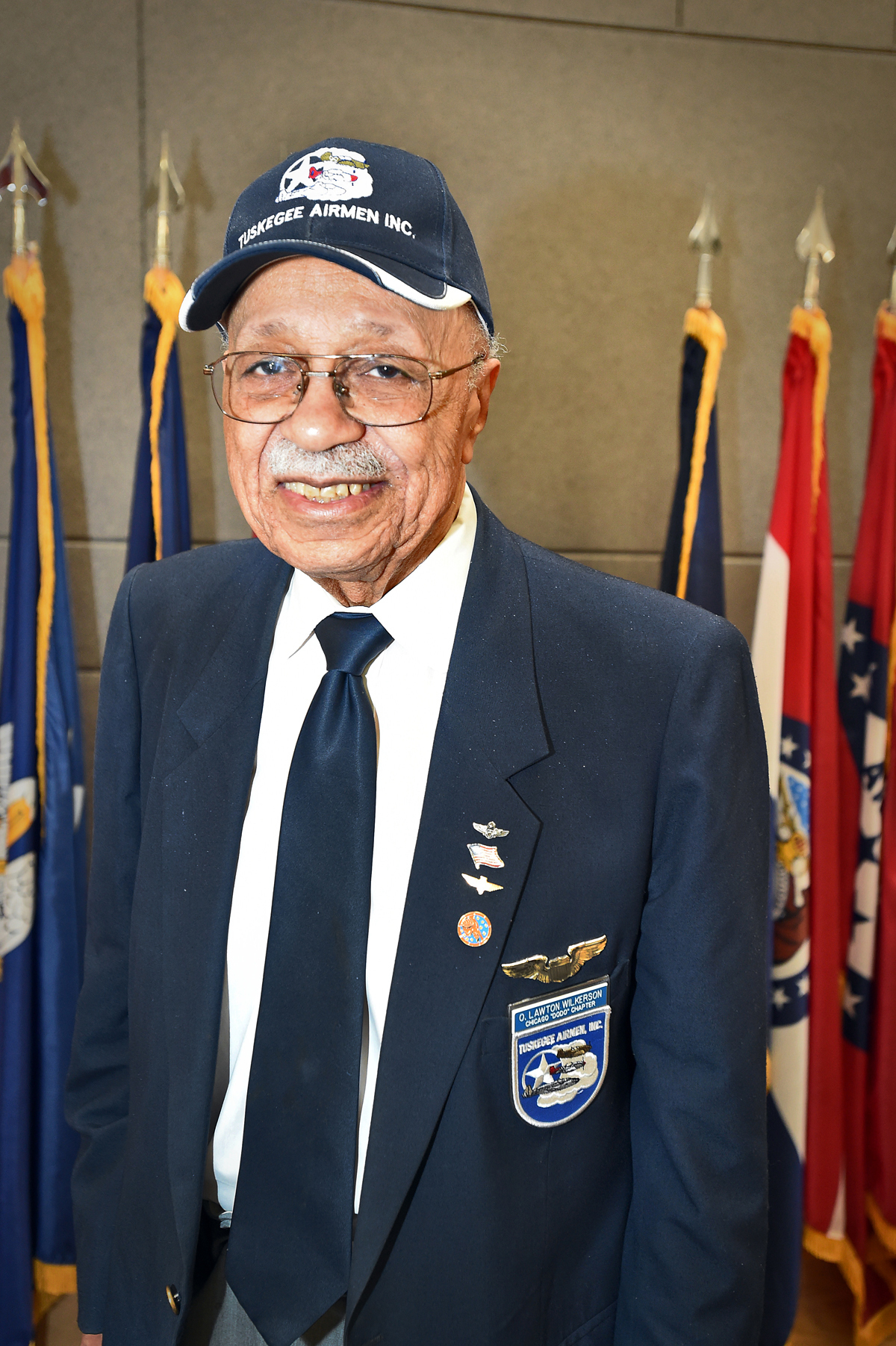
- Wilkerson in 2015
- Born: Oscar Lawton Wilkerson; February 9, 1926; Chicago Heights, Illinois, U.S.
- Died: February 8, 2023 (aged 96); Orland Park, Illinois, U.S.
- Alma mater: New York University
- Military career
- Allegiance: United States of America
- Branch: United States Air Force
- Rank: 2nd Lieutenant
- Unit: 617th bombardment squadron
- Awards: Congressional Gold Medal

Oscar Lawton Wilkerson (February 9, 1926 – February 8, 2023) was an American pilot and radio personality. He was one of the Tuskegee Airmen, a group of African American aviators and support personnel who served during World War II.

== Early life ==
Wilkerson was born February 9, 1926, in Chicago Heights, Illinois. He graduated from Bloom Township High School in 1944 and joined the United States Air Force.

== Military career ==
Wilkerson moved to Tuskegee, Alabama, for training and was assigned to the 617th Bombardment Squadron. He became 2nd Lieutenant and earned his "wings" in 1946. Wilkerson completed his training after the end of the war, so he did not have the chance to fly in combat.

Wilkerson faced significant racial discrimination while serving in the Air Force because of the segregation of the military at the time. “The military had no intention of using black pilots. The real mission, the underlying mission, was for us to fail and prove their point,” Wilkerson said in an interview with the Southtown Star. Wilkerson faced segregation when he was required to sit in a different train car than white soldiers on his way to the Tuskegee base. When he arrived there, he found that blacks were forced to eat separately during meals and to sit apart from white soldiers while watching films. Along with the other Tuskegee Airmen, Wilkerson proved that blacks could perform military duties as capably as whites could. The Tuskegee Airmen had a direct impact on the integration of the armed services.

== Civilian career ==
Following his military service, Wilkerson attended New York University to study photography. He also attended the Midwest Broadcasting School and graduated in 1960. He worked as a DJ for WBEE-AM in Harvey, Illinois and was known as "Weekend Wilkie." He also hosted his own radio show, Wilk's World. He served as community relations director and later as program director for WBEE-AM. Later, he worked for the radio station WMAQ (AM) until his retirement. Since his retirement, Wilkerson has spent time volunteering for the Chicago "DODO" Chapter of the Tuskegee Airmen, helping minority and at-risk youth fly for free through the "Young Eagles" program.

== Personal life and death ==
Wilkerson lived in Markham, Illinois. He died on February 8, 2023, a day before his 97th birthday.

== Awards ==
- Congressional Gold Medal awarded to the Tuskegee Airmen in 2006

== See also ==
- Dogfights (TV series)
- Executive Order 9981
- List of Tuskegee Airmen
- Military history of African Americans
- The Tuskegee Airmen (movie)

== Related works ==
- Westbrook, Shelby (2003). Tuskegee Airmen 1941-1945. Chicago: Tuskegee Airmen Inc. OCLC 30658216.
- Francis, Charles E. (1997). The Tuskegee Airmen: The Men Who Changed a Nation. Boston: Brandon Publishing Company. ISBN 9780828320290. OCLC 36241783.
- History Makers Interview with Wilkerson
- Red Tails, a 2012 film about the Tuskegee Airmen
