= Mike Downey (columnist) =

American newspaper columnist (1951–2024)

Mike Downey (August 9, 1951 – June 12, 2024) was an American newspaper columnist. He was known for his columns in the Chicago area, such as writing pieces for the Chicago Tribune, the Chicago Sun-Times and Chicago Daily News. In his later years, he began writing for the Los Angeles Times and CNN.

== Career ==
Downey began a career in journalism at age 15 for a newspaper chain in the south suburbs of Chicago. Over the following years he was a police reporter, entertainment writer, editor, critic and columnist and covered national political conventions, murder trials and twelve Olympic Games. Among his assignments, were an America's Cup yacht race in Australia, tennis at Wimbledon, British Open golf in Scotland, the Tour de France bicycle race, Stanley Cup hockey finals in Montreal and World Cup soccer in Italy, as well as Pan-American Games competitions in Argentina and Cuba.

He also was a columnist for The Sporting News and Sport Magazine and for 15 years wrote a humor column for Inside Sports magazine known as "The Good Doctor." He was a featured sports correspondent for KABC radio in Los Angeles and for WJR radio in Detroit and was often a panelist on ESPN television's weekly talk show, The Sports Reporters. He was a voter for the Baseball Hall of Fame.

From 2003 to 2008, Downey wrote the "In the Wake of the News" column for the Chicago Tribune originated by Ring Lardner in 1913, replacing Skip Bayless in that position at the Tribune. He was also a columnist in news, entertainment and sports for the Los Angeles Times, Detroit Free Press, Chicago Sun-Times and Chicago Daily News.

He was included as a character in the Elmore Leonard novel Be Cool. In retirement, he wrote book reviews for the Times and columns for CNN.com.

== Recognition ==
In statewide voting by peers, Downey was selected National Sportscasters and Sportswriters Association sportswriter of the year eleven times: in Illinois (twice), Michigan (twice) and California (seven times).

He was honored for his news column by the Los Angeles Press Club in 1998 and won the 1994 Eclipse Award, thoroughbred racing's highest honor. Downey's writing appeared in a variety of national magazines including GQ, Parade, Entertainment Weekly, Disney Adventures, American Way, Reader's Digest and TV Guide.

== Personal life ==
Downey was born in Chicago Heights, Illinois, on August 9, 1951. He graduated at 16 from Bloom Township High School in Chicago Heights.

Downey resided in Rancho Mirage, California. He was married to singer Gail Martin, daughter of the entertainer Dean Martin. Downey died from a heart attack in Rancho Mirage, on June 12, 2024, at the age of 72.
