= Lynwood, Illinois =

- Village
- Seal
- Motto(s): "A progressive, growing community of families and friends"
- Location of Lynwood in Cook County, Illinois.

- Location within Chicago metropolitan area Location within Illinois Location within the United States
- Coordinates: 41°31′35″N 87°32′53″W
- Country: United States
- State: Illinois
- County: Cook
- Township: Bloom
- Founded: 1959

Government
  - Type: Village
  - Mayor: Jada Curry

Area
  - Total: 5.04 sq mi (13.05 km^{2})
  - Land: 4.97 sq mi (12.86 km^{2})
  - Water: 0.077 sq mi (0.20 km^{2})

Population (2020)
  - Total: 9,116
  - Density: 1,836.6/sq mi (709.11/km^{2})
- Time zone: UTC−6 (CST)
  - Summer (DST): UTC−5 (CDT)
- ZIP Code: 60411
- Area code: 708
- FIPS code: 17-45421
- Website: www.villageoflynwood.gov

Lynwood is a village in Cook County, Illinois, United States, and a south suburb of Chicago. The population was 9,116 at the 2020 census.

Lynwood was founded in 1959. The village is bordered by Lansing to the north, Glenwood to the west, Ford Heights and Sauk Village to the south, and Dyer, Indiana, to the east. The Indiana state line borders the entire southeastern edge of Lynwood. The village is currently a mix of suburban neighborhoods with a substantial amount of remaining farmland.

== Geography ==
Lynwood is located at 41°31′35″N 87°32′53″W (41.526351, −87.548194).

According to the 2021 census gazetteer files, Lynwood has a total area of 5.04 square miles (13.05 km^{2}), of which 4.96 square miles (12.85 km^{2}) (or 98.47%) is land and 0.08 square miles (0.21 km^{2}) (or 1.53%) is water.

=== Surrounding areas ===
Lansing
Glenwood Munster
Glenwood Munster / Dyer
Ford Heights Dyer
Sauk Village

== Demographics ==
Historical population
Census	Pop.	Note	%±
1960	255		—
1970	1,042		308.6%
1980	4,195		302.6%
1990	6,535		55.8%
2000	7,377		12.9%
2010	9,007		22.1%
2020	9,116		1.2%
U.S. Decennial Census; 2010 2020

=== Racial and ethnic composition ===
Lynwood village, Illinois – Racial and ethnic composition Note: the US Census treats Hispanic/Latino as an ethnic category. This table excludes Latinos from the racial categories and assigns them to a separate category. Hispanics/Latinos may be of any race.
Race / Ethnicity (NH = Non-Hispanic)	Pop 2000	Pop 2010	Pop 2020	% 2000	% 2010	% 2020
White alone (NH)	3,516	2,265	1,187	47.66%	25.15%	13.02%
Black or African American alone (NH)	3,337	5,886	6,869	45.24%	65.35%	75.35%
Native American or Alaska Native alone (NH)	11	9	12	0.15%	0.10%	0.13%
Asian alone (NH)	67	47	41	0.91%	0.52%	0.45%
Pacific Islander alone (NH)	0	0	1	0.00%	0.00%	0.01%
Other race alone (NH)	5	10	25	0.07%	0.11%	0.27%
Mixed race or Multiracial (NH)	104	133	229	1.41%	1.48%	2.51%
Hispanic or Latino (any race)	337	657	752	4.57%	7.29%	8.25%
Total	7,377	9,007	9,116	100.00%	100.00%	100.00%

=== 2020 census ===
As of the 2020 census, Lynwood had a population of 9,116. The median age was 42.1 years. 21.6% of residents were under the age of 18 and 17.5% of residents were 65 years of age or older. For every 100 females there were 84.0 males, and for every 100 females age 18 and over there were 79.7 males age 18 and over.

99.8% of residents lived in urban areas, while 0.2% lived in rural areas.

There were 3,445 households in Lynwood, of which 31.9% had children under the age of 18 living in them. Of all households, 37.8% were married-couple households, 17.5% were households with a male householder and no spouse or partner present, and 39.4% were households with a female householder and no spouse or partner present. About 27.6% of all households were made up of individuals and 12.9% had someone living alone who was 65 years of age or older.

There were 3,624 housing units, of which 4.9% were vacant. The homeowner vacancy rate was 2.1% and the rental vacancy rate was 6.3%.

=== Income and poverty ===
The median income for a household in the village was $76,154, and the median income for a family was $101,935. Males had a median income of $51,774 versus $36,304 for females. The per capita income for the village was $31,039. About 4.0% of families and 7.1% of the population were below the poverty line, including 8.8% of those under age 18 and 14.2% of those age 65 or over.

== Government ==
Lynwood is in Illinois's 2nd congressional district and the village mayor is Jada D. Curry. The Police Chief is Gregory Thomas and the Chief Public Safety Fire Administrator is LaShaun Alston.

== Transportation ==
Pace provides bus service on Route 358 connecting Lynwood to destinations across the Southland.

Lynwood commuters to Chicago will also be served by either the Munster Ridge or the Munster/Dyer South Shore Line rail stations in Munster, Indiana, located on the Monon Corridor line. It opened to revenue service on March 31, 2026. There are no published plans for PACE connectivity to the train stations at this time.
