= Bloom Township High School District 206 =

School district in Illinois, United States

Location
- Bloom Township, Illinois United States
- Coordinates: 41°30′49″N 87°38′41″W

District information
- Type: Public
- Grades: 9–12
- Superintendent: Lenell Q. Navarre Ed.D.
- NCES District ID: 1706420

Students and staff
- Enrollment: 2,964 (2022-2023)
- Staff: 167.20 (on an FTE basis)
- Student–teacher ratio: 17.73

Other information
- Website: sd206.org

The Bloom Township High School District 206 is a public high school district, is a south suburbs of Chicago, that serves Bloom Township, Illinois, United States. The district consists of 3,558 students in grades 9-12 in two high schools and one alternative high school.

== Administration ==
District 206’s administration consists of an elected school board and paid executive staff. The school board consists of seven members including one president, vice president, and secretary. The members are elected on odd years in the spring and serve four year terms.

The president, vice president, and secretary are nominated and voted on by members of the school board during its organizational meeting. Illinois state law requires each school board to hold an organizational meeting following the election. During the organizational meeting the board must also seat new members and establish a regular meeting schedule.

District 206’s executive staff consists of: superintendent, two assistant superintendents, director of special education, alternative principal, and director of athletics.

== District Report Card (Performance) ==
The ACT assessment for the graduating class of 2010 was lower on all subjects compared to the state average.

Area Graded	Score	State Average
Composite	16.6	20.5
English	15.8	19.9
Mathematics	16.4	20.5
Reading	16.8	20.6
Science	16.7	20.3

The District's overall Prairie State Achievement Examination (PSAE) performance falls below the state average.

Year	District Average	State Average
2008-09	19.9	53.0
2009-10	23.3	53.0

== Current Administration ==
=== School Board ===
Name	Position	Next Election
Henry Drake	Board President	2025
William "Bill" Angell	Board Vice President	2023
Teresa Palombi	Secretary	2023
Karen King	Board Member	2025
Anthony Murphy	Board Member	2025
Cassandra Everett	Board Member	2023
Lorena Varelai	Board Member	2027

=== Executive Administration ===
Name	Position	Salary
Dr. Lenell Navarre	Superintendent	$192,000
Dorith Johnson	Assistant Superintendent Instruction	NA
Dr. Alicia Evans	Chief School Business Official	NA
Dawn McCune-Angelini	Director of Special Education	NA
Constance Joubert	Alternative Principal	NA
Joseph Reda	Athletic Director	$113,017

== High schools ==
- Bloom High School
- Bloom Trail High School
