= Bloom Township, Illinois =

Bloom Township
- Township
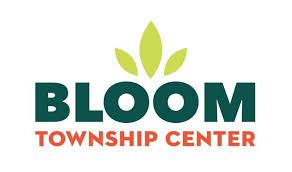
- logo

- Location in Cook County

- Cook County's location in Illinois
- Coordinates: 41°31′02″N 87°36′03″W
- Country: United States
- State: Illinois
- County: Cook

Area
  - Total: 46.7 sq mi (121.0 km^{2})
  - Land: 46.4 sq mi (120.3 km^{2})
  - Water: 0.27 sq mi (0.7 km^{2}) 0.59%
- Elevation: 630 ft (192 m)

Population (2020)
  - Total: 86,018
  - Density: 1,852/sq mi (715.0/km^{2})
- Time zone: UTC-6 (CST)
  - Summer (DST): UTC-5 (CDT)
- ZIP codes: 60411, 60422, 60425, 60430, 60438, 60461, 60466, 60475, 60476
- FIPS code: 17-031-06561
- Website: www.bloomtownship.org

Bloom Township is one of 29 townships in Cook County, Illinois, USA. As of the 2020 census, its population was 86,018 and it contained 33,964 housing units.

== Geography ==
According to the United States Census Bureau, Bloom Township covers an area of 46.7 square miles (121.0 km^{2}); of this, 46.4 square miles (120.3 km^{2}) is land and 0.27 square miles (0.7 km^{2}), or 0.59 percent, is water.

=== Cities, towns, villages ===
- Chicago Heights
- Flossmoor (east quarter)
- Ford Heights
- Glenwood (vast majority)
- Homewood (half)
- Lansing (south quarter)
- Lynwood
- Olympia Fields (small portion)
- Park Forest (small portion)
- Sauk Village (vast majority)
- South Chicago Heights
- Steger (north half)

The eastern third of Franciscan Health Dyer also resides in this township platted to Dyer but not officially recognized on the Illinois side.

=== Unincorporated Towns ===
- Graymoor at 41.523926°N 87.669487°W
- Holbrook at 41.538368°N 87.636711°W

=== Adjacent townships ===
- Thornton Township (north)
- North Township, Lake County, Indiana (northeast)
- St. John Township, Lake County, Indiana (east)
- Crete Township, Will County (south)
- Monee Township, Will County (southwest)
- Rich Township (west)
- Bremen Township (northwest)

=== Cemeteries ===
The township contains these six cemeteries: Assumption, Bloom Presbyterian, Calvary, Mount Glenwood Memory Gardens, Saint James Catholic and Saint Pauls Evangelical Lutheran.

=== Major highways ===
- U.S. Route 30
- Illinois Route 1
- Illinois Route 394

=== Airports and landing strips ===
- Lansing Municipal Airport
- Mulderink Heliport
- Raeco Heliport

=== Lakes ===
- Sauk Lake
- Weatherstone Lake

=== Landmarks ===
- Cook County Forest Preserves

== Demographics ==
Bloom Township, Illinois – Racial and ethnic composition Note: the US Census treats Hispanic/Latino as an ethnic category. This table excludes Latinos from the racial categories and assigns them to a separate category. Hispanics/Latinos may be of any race.
Race / Ethnicity (NH = Non-Hispanic)	Pop 2000	Pop 2010	Pop 2020	% 2000	% 2010	% 2020
White alone (NH)	49,347	30,315	19,514	52.55%	33.34%	22.69%
Black or African American alone (NH)	30,430	41,099	43,614	32.41%	45.20%	50.70%
Native American or Alaska Native alone (NH)	115	108	88	0.12%	0.12%	0.10%
Asian alone (NH)	724	681	617	0.77%	0.75%	0.72%
Native Hawaiian or Pacific Islander alone (NH)	19	25	46	0.02%	0.03%	0.05%
Other race alone (NH)	100	151	364	0.11%	0.17%	0.42%
Mixed race or Multiracial (NH)	1,198	1,489	2,446	1.28%	1.64%	2.84%
Hispanic or Latino (any race)	11,968	17,054	19,329	12.75%	18.76%	22.47%
Total	93,901	90,922	86,018	100.00%	100.00%	100.00%

As of the 2020 census there were 86,018 people, 30,840 households, and 21,445 families residing in the township. The population density was 1,844.14 inhabitants per square mile (712.03/km^{2}). There were 33,964 housing units at an average density of 728.15 units per square mile (281.14 units/km^{2}). The racial makeup of the township was 25.85% White, 51.34% African American, 0.71% Native American, 0.75% Asian, 0.09% Pacific Islander, 12.41% from other races, and 8.86% from two or more races. Hispanic or Latino of any race were 22.47% of the population.

There were 30,840 households, out of which 33.10% had children under the age of 18 living with them, 38.95% were married couples living together, 23.83% had a female householder with no spouse present, and 30.46% were non-families. 27.30% of all households were made up of individuals, and 12.00% had someone living alone who was 65 years of age or older. The average household size was 2.84 and the average family size was 3.48.

The township's age distribution consisted of 25.6% under the age of 18, 9.6% from 18 to 24, 23.4% from 25 to 44, 25.7% from 45 to 64, and 15.7% who were 65 years of age or older. The median age was 37.6 years. For every 100 females, there were 89.2 males. For every 100 females age 18 and over, there were 85.8 males.

The median income for a household in the township was $57,108, and the median income for a family was $69,840. Males had a median income of $40,830 versus $31,717 for females. The per capita income for the township was $26,320. About 12.9% of families and 17.8% of the population were below the poverty line, including 27.5% of those under age 18 and 12.5% of those age 65 or over.

Historical population
Census	Pop.	Note	%±
2000	93,901		—
2010	90,922		−3.2%
2020	86,018		−5.4%
U.S. Decennial Census

== Political districts ==
- Illinois's 2nd congressional district
- State House District 29
- State House District 30
- State House District 80
- State Senate District 15
- State Senate District 40
