= Bloom High School =

Public high school in Illinois, United States

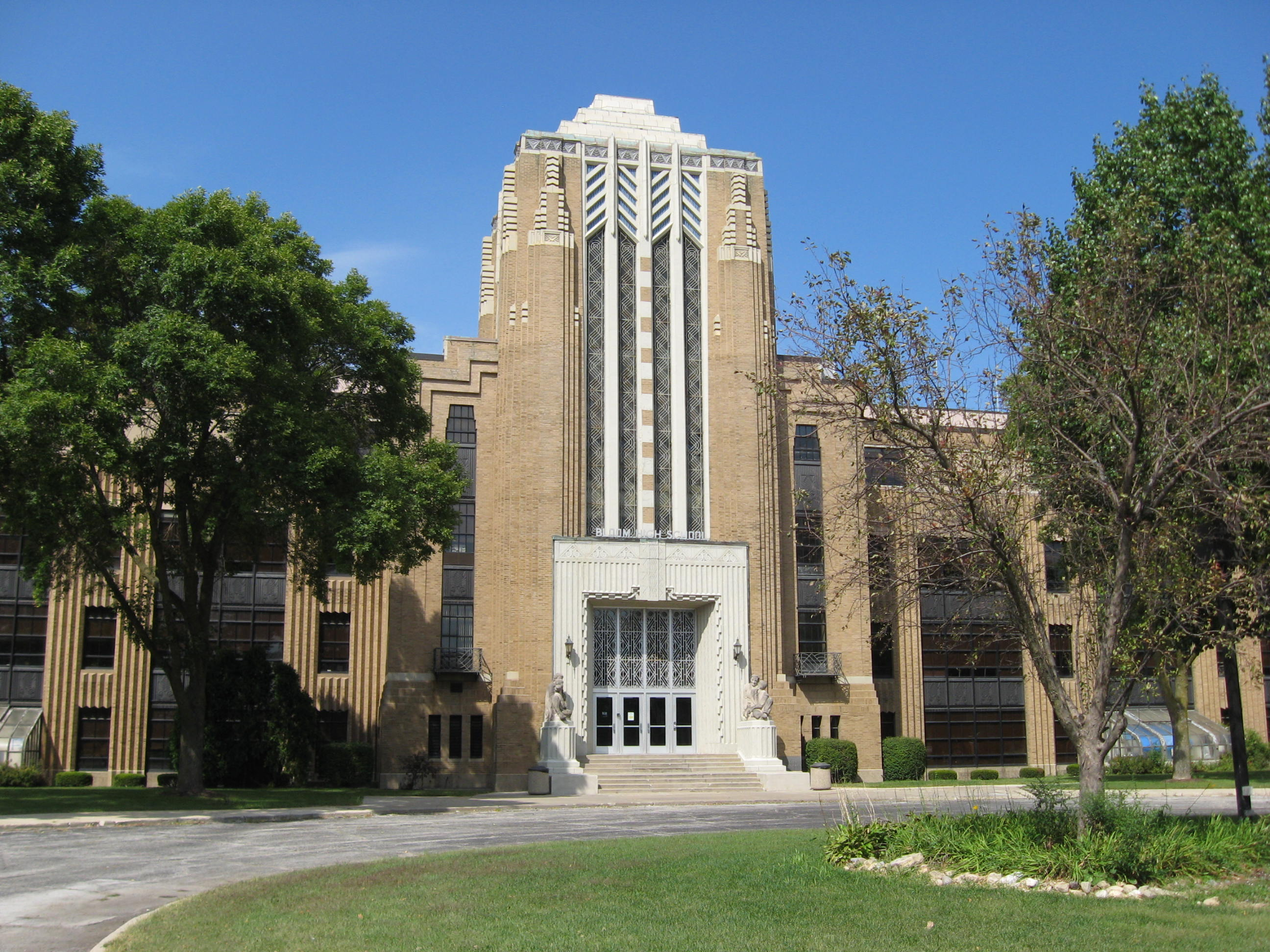
- Front entrance

Location
- 101 W. 10th Street; Chicago Heights, Illinois 60411; United States; 41.5142°N 87.6440°W

Information
- School type: Public Comprehensive Secondary
- Opened: 1900
- School district: Bloom Twp. HS 206
- Superintendent: Lenell Navarre
- Principal: Jerry Anderson
- Teaching staff: 99.78 (FTE)
- Grades: 9–12
- Gender: Coed
- Enrollment: 1,823 (2024–2025)
  - Grade 9: 513 students
  - Grade 10: 540 students
  - Grade 11: 352 students
  - Grade 12: 418 students
- Average class size: 23.7
- Student to teacher ratio: 18.27
- Campus type: Suburban
- Colors: Blue; White
- Slogan: "We're From Bloom, & Couldn't Be Prouder"
- Athletics conference: Southland Athletic Conference
- Mascot: Blazing Trojan
- Team name: Bloom Township Blazing Trojans
- Accreditation: AdvancED
- Newspaper: The Broadcaster
- Yearbook: The Annual
- Website: http://www.bloomhs.org/
- Bloom Township High School
- U.S. National Register of Historic Places
- Location within Illinois Location within the United States
- Area: 10.7 acres (4.3 ha)
- Built: 1931
- Architect: Royer, Danely & Smith
- Architectural style: Art Deco, Zig-Zag Modern
- NRHP reference No.: 82002527
- Added to NRHP: June 3, 1982

Bloom High School is a public school in Chicago Heights, Illinois. It is part of Bloom Township High School District 206.

The school was founded in 1900. A second Chicago Heights high school, Bloom Trail, was established in 1976 to offset overcrowding. Since 1995, however, Bloom and Bloom Trail have shared the same sports programs, drawing from over 3,000 students in grades 9 to 12.

The present Bloom High School building, erected during the Great Depression, was named to the National Register of Historic Places on June 3, 1982. It is an Art Deco structure with six WPA murals. The frescoes were created by Edgar Britton in 1935. The two limestone sculptures were designed by Curtis Drewes. The main structure of the high school was designed by the architectural firm of Royer, Danley, and Smith of Urbana, Illinois. Major additions were finished in 1956 and 1976.

In celebration of the 2018 Illinois Bicentennial, Bloom High School was selected as one of the Illinois 200 Great Places by the American Institute of Architects Illinois component (AIA Illinois).

== Athletics ==
Since 1995, Bloom and Bloom Trail have operated a cooperative athletic program. Prior to consolidating in sports, Bloom's teams were known as the Trojans. When combined with Bloom Trail (which used the name Blazers), teams are called the "Bloom Township Blazing Trojans". Both alone, and as a part of the cooperative program, Bloom was a member of the South Inter-Conference Association (SICA) until the conference dissolved in 2005. Since 2020, the program has been a member of the Southland Athletic Conference.

The following teams won their respective IHSA sponsored state championship tournament/meet.

- Cross Country (Boys): State Champions (1950–51, 1974–75, 1975–76)
- Track & Field (Boys): State Champions (1955–56, 1956–57, 1957–58, 1958–59, 1976–77, 1987–88)
- Wrestling: State Champions (1974–75, 1975–76)

Bloom played in the title game of the Illinois High School Boys Basketball Championship in both 1974 and 1975.

== Notable alumni ==
- George Barnes was a pioneer of the electric guitar with a 44-year career in jazz, blues, pop, and country as a guitarist, arranger, composer, conductor and producer.
- Terry Boers was co–host of a weekday afternoon sports talk radio show in Chicago.
- David S. Broder was a Pulitzer Prize–winning journalist, author, and television commentator. He was a White House correspondent and a political columnist for The Washington Post.
- Jim Bouton is a former Major League Baseball pitcher (1962–70, 78), playing most of his career for the New York Yankees, pitching in 1963 and 1964 World Series; also author of best-seller Ball Four.
- Luke Butkus, NFL and University of Illinois assistant coach, graduate of Bloom Trail.
- Jerry Colangelo is a sports mogul; former owner of the Arizona Diamondbacks, Phoenix Suns, Phoenix Mercury, and Arizona Rattlers; former chairman of operations of the Philadelphia 76ers, national director of USA Basketball, and is a member of the Naismith Memorial Basketball Hall of Fame.
- Eddie Condon, jazz musician and bandleader.
- Aldo DeAngelis, state senator 1979–97.
- Ricky Dillard, gospel singer.
- Mike Downey has been a columnist for the Los Angeles Times and Chicago Tribune.
- Tom Erikson is an NCAA All-American wrestler and mixed martial artist.
- Wally Flager was a shortstop for the Philadelphia Phillies and Cincinnati Reds.
- Robert P. Hanrahan is a former US Congressman (Illinois's 3rd congressional district).
- Cory Hardrict, actor, graduate of Bloom Trail.
- Debbie Halvorson is a former US Congresswoman, who represented Illinois's 11th congressional district.
- Lynn Hamilton was an actress, best known for her work on television (Sanford and Son, The Waltons, Generations, Roots: The Next Generations).
- Leroy Jackson was a running back for Western Illinois and the Washington Redskins. He was a three-time winner of the Illinois state championship in the 100 meter dash from 1956 to 1958.
- Jan Johnson is a former pole vaulter who won three NCAA championships plus a bronze medal at the 1972 Olympics.
- Carol Mann is a former LPGA golfer and 1977 inductee in the World Golf Hall of Fame.
- Audie Matthews, basketball player, captain of 1976-77 and 1977-78 Illinois Fighting Illini teams.
- Ed Scheiwe (1918–1997), won the NCAA men's basketball national championship while playing for Wisconsin, and he later played professionally
- Jeff Slade (1941–2012), NBA player for the Chicago Zephyrs
- Derrick Walker, class of 1985, was Chicago Sun-Times Athlete of the Year, played football for University of Michigan and for NFL's San Diego Chargers and Kansas City Chiefs.
- Oscar Lawton Wilkerson, pilot
- Will Williams (born 1995), American long jumper
- Bryant Young is a former defensive lineman (1994–2007) for the San Francisco 49ers, member of the Super Bowl XXIX championship team and NFL 1990s All–Decade Team; assistant coach for Atlanta Falcons, Pro Football Hall of Fame.

== Notable faculty ==
- Steve Miller, a former Bloom track-and-field coach, has been a football player for the Detroit Lions, track coach and athletic director at Kansas State University, executive at Nike and director of the Professional Bowlers Association.
- Wes Mason won 316 games as Bloom's head basketball coach and is a member of the Illinois Basketball Coaches Hall of Fame. He was a player for the Bradley college team that won the 1957 National Invitation Tournament championship.
