= South Chicago Heights, Illinois =

- Village
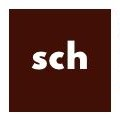
- Flag logo

- Location of South Chicago Heights in Cook County, Illinois.

- Location within Chicago metropolitan area Location within Illinois Location within the United States
- Coordinates: 41°29′0″N 87°38′15″W
- Country: United States
- State: Illinois
- County: Cook
- Township: Bloom

Area
  - Total: 1.60 sq mi (4.14 km^{2})
  - Land: 1.58 sq mi (4.09 km^{2})
  - Water: 0.015 sq mi (0.04 km^{2})

Population (2020)
  - Total: 4,026
  - Density: 2,547/sq mi (983.4/km^{2})
- Time zone: UTC-6 (CST)
  - Summer (DST): UTC-5 (CDT)
- ZIP Code(s): 60411
- Area code: 708
- FIPS code: 17-70629
- Website: www.southchicagoheights.com

South Chicago Heights is a village and a south suburb in Cook County, Illinois, United States. The population was 4,026 at the 2020 census.

== Geography ==
South Chicago Heights is located at 41°29′0″N 87°38′15″W (41.483375, −87.637461).

According to the 2010 census, South Chicago Heights has a total area of 1.596 square miles (4.13 km^{2}), of which 1.58 square miles (4.09 km^{2}) (or 99%) is land and 0.016 square miles (0.04 km^{2}) (or 1%) is water.

== Demographics ==
Historical population
Census	Pop.	Note	%±
1910	552		—
1920	949		71.9%
1930	1,691		78.2%
1940	1,837		8.6%
1950	2,129		15.9%
1960	4,043		89.9%
1970	4,923		21.8%
1980	3,932		−20.1%
1990	3,597		−8.5%
2000	3,970		10.4%
2010	4,139		4.3%
2020	4,026		−2.7%
U.S. Decennial Census; 2010 2020

=== Racial and ethnic composition ===
South Chicago Heights, Illinois – Racial and ethnic composition Note: the US Census treats Hispanic/Latino as an ethnic category. This table excludes Latinos from the racial categories and assigns them to a separate category. Hispanics/Latinos may be of any race.
Race / Ethnicity (NH = Non-Hispanic)	Pop 2000	Pop 2010	Pop 2020	% 2000	% 2010	% 2020
White alone (NH)	2,857	1,938	1,270	71.96%	46.82%	31.54%
Black or African American alone (NH)	274	643	671	6.90%	15.54%	16.67%
Native American or Alaska Native alone (NH)	6	5	5	0.15%	0.12%	0.12%
Asian alone (NH)	38	46	65	0.96%	1.11%	1.61%
Native Hawaiian or Pacific Islander alone (NH)	1	7	2	0.03%	0.17%	0.05%
Other race alone (NH)	4	5	9	0.10%	0.12%	0.22%
Mixed race or Multiracial (NH)	72	55	104	1.81%	1.33%	2.58%
Hispanic or Latino (any race)	718	1,440	1,900	18.09%	34.79%	47.19%
Total	3,970	4,139	4,026	100.00%	100.00%	100.00%

Race (NH = Non-Hispanic)	% 1990	% 1980	Pop 1990	Pop 1980
White alone (NH)	85%	91.5%	3,058	3,596
Black alone (NH)	1.2%	0.4%	42	14
American Indian alone (NH)	0.1%	0.2%	2	6
Asian or Pacific Islander alone (NH)	0.2%	0.1%	6	4
Other race alone (NH)	0.2%	0%	6	0
Hispanic/Latino (any race)	13.4%	7.9%	483	312

=== 2020 census ===
As of the 2020 census, South Chicago Heights had a population of 4,026 and 1,056 families residing in the village. The median age was 36.2 years. 25.0% of residents were under the age of 18 and 12.8% of residents were 65 years of age or older. For every 100 females, there were 101.4 males, and for every 100 females age 18 and over, there were 99.1 males age 18 and over.

100.0% of residents lived in urban areas, while 0.0% lived in rural areas.

There were 1,520 households in the village, of which 33.0% had children under the age of 18 living in them. Of all households, 39.1% were married-couple households, 23.4% were households with a male householder and no spouse or partner present, and 29.6% were households with a female householder and no spouse or partner present. About 30.4% of all households were made up of individuals, and 9.6% had someone living alone who was 65 years of age or older. The average household size was 3.16 and the average family size was 2.52.

The population density was 2,520.98 inhabitants per square mile (973.36/km^{2}). There were 1,644 housing units at an average density of 1,029.43 per square mile (397.47/km^{2}), of which 7.5% were vacant. The homeowner vacancy rate was 2.0% and the rental vacancy rate was 7.9%.

The most reported ancestries in 2020 were:

- Mexican (42%)
- African American (13.4%)
- German (9.6%)
- Irish (7.7%)
- Italian (7.5%)
- English (4.4%)
- Polish (3.8%)
- Puerto Rican (2%)
- Dutch (1%)

=== Income and poverty ===
The median income for a household in the village was $45,321, and the median income for a family was $46,799. Males had a median income of $39,797 versus $30,529 for females. The per capita income for the village was $19,323. About 18.1% of families and 18.7% of the population were below the poverty line, including 22.7% of those under age 18 and 14.9% of those age 65 or over.

== Government ==
South Chicago Heights is in Illinois's 2nd congressional district.

== Transportation ==
Pace provides bus service on Route 358 connecting South Chicago Heights to destinations across the Southland.
