= List of people with prostate cancer =

This is a list of notable individuals who died from or were diagnosed with cancer of prostate. These diagnoses and deaths from this form of cancer have been confirmed by public information and reports.

Prostate cancer is a form of cancer that is typically slow-growing and originates in or on the prostate, a male reproductive gland that surrounds the urethra in proximity of the bladder and rectum. This is a result of malignant cells forming and multiplying at the prostate, which can then spread or metastasize to other organs in the body. The most common areas that cancer metastasizes is the lymph nodes and bones. According to the American Cancer Society, prostate cancer is the most common form of cancer in males after skin cancer. Many cases of prostate cancer present little to no symptoms in early stages. Symptoms may include frequent urination, painful urination and ejaculation, urination and ejaculation difficulties, blood in urine and/or semen, and erectile dysfunction.

== Acting, directing, and filmmaking ==
Name	Lifetime	Comments	Reference(s)
Jake Abraham	1967 –2023	British actor; died at the age of 56 after being diagnosed in July 2023	
Frank Albanese	1931 – 2015	American actor	
Abdul Khaleq Alghanem	1958 – 2021	Saudi Arabian director; received diagnosis in 2016	
Don Ameche	1908 – 1993	American actor and comedian; died at the age of 85 after being diagnosed in late 1992 after the cancer had spread	
Lew Anderson	1922 – 2006	American actor and musician	
Roger Beatty	1933 – 2020	American director, screenwriter, and stage manager	
Jerry Belson	1938 – 2006	American writer, director, and producer	
Michael Bentine	1922 – 1996	British comedian and actor	
William Berger	1928 – 1993	Austrian-born American actor (cancer diagnosis publicly revealed in August 1993, dying later in October 1993)	
Bill Bixby	1934 – 1993	American actor, director, and producer; died at the age of 59 after being diagnosed in 1991	
Lasse Brandeby	1945 – 2011	Swedish actor, comedian, and journalist (died at the age of 66 after being diagnosed in 2007)	
Gil Brother	1957 – 2023	Brazilian actor, humorist, dancer and YouTuber; died at the age of 66 after suffering from both prostate and bladder cancer	
Charles Brown	1946 – 2004	American actor	
John Carl Buechler	1952 – 2019	American special-make-up effects artist, director, filmmaker, and actor; died at the age of 66 after being diagnosed with stage IV prostate cancer a month before his death	
Henry Bumstead	1915 – 2006	American cinematic art director and production designer; died at the age of 91 after being diagnosed with prostate cancer while filming Million Dollar Baby	
Frank Capra Jr.	1934 – 2007	American film and television producer	
Fernando Casanova	1925 – 2012	Mexican actor; died at the age of 86 after a battle with metastatic prostate cancer after multiple years	
Michael Catt	1952 – 2023	American film producer, author, and pastor; died at the age of 70 in hospice care after being diagnosed 5 years before his death	
Tony Conrad	1940 – 2016	American video artist, filmmaker, musician, composer, and sound artist (died at the age of 76 after suffering from prostate cancer and pneumonia)	
Gary Cooper	1901 – 1961	American actor; died at the age of 60 after suffering from prostate cancer and colorectal cancer	
Hume Cronyn	1911 – 2003	Canadian actor and writer	
Peter Cushing	1913 – 1994	English actor; died at the age of 81 after being diagnosed in the early 1980s	
Sadiq Daba	died 2021	Nigerian actor and broadcaster; died after being diagnosed with leukemia and prostate cancer 4 years before his death	
Bob Delegall	1945 – 2006	American actor, television director, and producer	
William Demarest	1892 – 1983	American actor; died at the age of 91 after collapsing at his home, suffering from prostate cancer and pneumonia	
Robert De Niro	1943 – present	American actor and film producer (diagnosed with early stage prostate cancer in October 2003, was reported to have made a full recovery from his cancer)	
Marc Van Eeghem	1960 – 2017	Belgian actor; died at the age of 57 after being diagnosed 7 years before his death	
Richard Egan	1921 – 1987	American actor	
Colin Egglesfield	1973 – present	American actor; revealed in January 2025 that he was recovering from surgery for prostate cancer, his third cancer diagnosis.	
Tibor Feheregyhazi	1932 – 2007	Hungarian-Canadian actor and director	
Richard Franklin	1948 – 2007	Australian film director	
William Franklyn	1925 – 2006	British actor	
Gray Frederickson	1937 – 2022	American film producer	
Kinji Fukasaku	1930 – 2003	Japanese film director and screenwriter	
Harold Gould	1923 – 2010	American actor; died at the age of 86 from metastatic prostate cancer	
Stewart Granger	1913 – 1993	British actor; died at the age of 80 after suffering from a lung illness and prostate cancer	
Val Guest	1911 – 2006	English film director and screenwriter	
Robert Guillaume	1927 – 2017	American actor and singer	
Bob Hastings	1925 – 2014	American actor	
Charlton Heston	1923 – 2008	American actor and political activist (diagnosis of prostate cancer publicly revealed in January 1999. He would undergo weeks of intense radiation therapy after his diagnosis. Died at the age of 84 in April 2008 from pneumonia as a result of Alzheimer's disease)	
Brian Hibbard	1946 – 2012	Welsh actor and singer	
Israel Hicks	1943 – 2010	American theatre director	
Wilhelm von Homburg	1940 – 2004	German boxer, actor, and professional wrestler	
Bob Homme	1919 – 2000	American-Canadian actor	
Alan Hopgood	1934 – 2022	Australian actor, producer, and writer; died at the age of 87 after being diagnosed at the age of 59	
Dennis Hopper	1936 – 2010	American actor and film director (died at the age of 74 from metastasized prostate cancer after being first diagnosed in 2002, later being diagnosed a second time in October 2009)	
Ken Howard	1944 – 2016	American actor; died at the age of 71 after being diagnosed with stage 4 prostate cancer	
Geoffrey Hughes	1944 – 2012	English actor (died at the age of 68 after being first diagnosed with prostate cancer in 1996, diagnosed a second time in 2010)	
William Hurt	1950 – 2022	American actor; died at the age of 71 after being diagnosed with terminal stage 4 prostate cancer that had metastasized to his bones in 2012	
Brian Jackson	1931 – 2022	British actor, photographer, and producer	
Charles Jarrott	1927 – 2011	British film and television director	
Peter Jeffrey	1929 – 1999	English actor	
Arte Johnson	1929 – 2019	American actor and comedian; died at the age of 90 after battling bladder and prostate cancer for about three years	
Wik Jongsma	1943 – 2008	Dutch actor; died at the age of 65 after being diagnosed in 2006	
Jerome Kass	1937 – 2015	American screenwriter and author	
John B. Keane	1928 – 2002	Irish playwright, novelist, essayist; died at the age of 73 after being diagnosed in 1994	
Herbert Kenwith	1917 – 2008	American television producer, writer, director, and producer	
Jack Klugman	1922 – 2012	American actor	
Krzysztof Krauze	1953 – 2014	Polish film director, cinematographer, and actor	
George Kuchar	1942 – 2011	Film director and video artist	
Oscar Lerman	1919 – 1992	American film and theatre producer and nightclub impresario (died at the age of 72 after battling prostate cancer for 5 years)	
Gene Levitt	1920 – 1999	American television writer, producer, and director	
David Lloyd	1934 – 2009	American television screenwriter and producer	
Harold Lloyd	1893 – 1971	American actor, comedian, and stunt performer	
Tony Lo Bianco	1936 – 2024	American actor	
Fredric March	1897 – 1975	American actor	
Gardner McKay	1932 – 2001	American actor, artist, and author	
Ian McKellen	1939 – present	English actor (diagnosed with prostate cancer in the mid-2000s. Revealed his diagnosis publicly in December 2012)	
Allan McKeown	1946 – 2013	British television and stage producer	
Bob Monkhouse	1928 – 2003	English comedian, writer, and actor (diagnosed with prostate cancer in 2001, kept his diagnosis private. He died two years later at the age of 75. His likeness was used to promote prostate cancer awareness after his death)	
Roger Moore	1927 – 2017	English actor (diagnosed with prostate cancer in 1993, he later underwent a prostatectomy. He would later die at the age of 89 from liver cancer that had metastasized to his lung)	
Gerard Murphy	1948 – 2013	British actor; died at the age of 64 after being diagnosed two and a half years before his death	
Charles Nolte	1923 – 2010	American actor, director, playwright, and educator; died at the age of 86 after being diagnosed two years earlier	
Laurence Olivier	1907 – 1989	English actor and director (died at the age of 82 from renal failure after suffering from prostate cancer and a variety of ailments, including pleurisy, thrombosis, and a degenerative muscle disease for several years)	
Jerry Orbach	1935 – 2004	American actor and singer (diagnosed with prostate cancer in January 1994 after a prostate-specific antigen screening. Cancer had gone into remission after radiation, chemotherapy, and a prostatectomy. His cancer returned and metastasized by March 2004. Orbach succumbed to his cancer at the age of 69)	
Ryan O'Neal	1941 – 2023	American actor and boxer (battled leukemia in the early 2000s. He was diagnosed with stage 2 prostate cancer initially misreported as stage 4 in 2012. He later died 11 years later at the age of 82 in December 2023 from congestive heart failure)	
Mandy Patinkin	1952 – present	American actor and singer (diagnosed with prostate cancer in 2004, made a full recovery)	
John Patterson	1940 – 2005	American television director	
Dick Peabody	1925 – 1999	American actor	
Frank Perry	1930 – 1995	American stage director and filmmaker (died at the age of 65 after diagnosed with prostate cancer in June 1990)	
Roger Perry	1933 – 2018	American actor	
Florian Pittiș	1943 – 2007	Romanian actor (diagnosed with terminal prostate cancer about a year and a half before his death)	
Sidney Poitier	1927 – 2022	Bahamian and American actor, film director, and diplomat (diagnosed with prostate cancer in the 1990s. Died about 30 years later at the age of 94. His official cause of death is listed to be due to prostate cancer, dementia, and heart failure)	
Richard M. Powell	1916 – 1996	American screenwriter	
D. Ramanaidu	1936 – 2015	Indian film producer	
Thurl Ravenscroft	1914 – 2005	American actor and bass singer	
Corin Redgrave	1939 – 2010	English actor (diagnosed with inoperable prostate cancer in 1999. Died at the age of 70 about 11 years after his initial diagnosis)	
Michael Ritchie	1938 – 2001	American film director, producer, and writer	
Ross Rival	1945 – 2007	Filipino actor	
Eddie Romero	1924 – 2013	Filipino film director, producer, and screenwriter (died of cardiopulmonary arrest due to a brain blood clot at the age of 88. He was diagnosed with prostate cancer a year before his death)	
Dick Sargent	1930 – 1994	American actor (diagnosed with prostate cancer in 1989. His cancer was diagnosed early but soon spread and Sargent was in poor health by early 1994. He died at the age of 64, about 5 years after his initial diagnosis)	
Telly Savalas	1922 – 1994	American actor; died at the age of 72 from prostate and bladder cancer	
Harry Secombe	1921 – 2001	Welsh actor, comedian, singer, and television presenter (diagnosed with prostate cancer in the summer of 1998. Kept diagnosis private initially, later advocating for increased awareness of the disease. Died 2 years later at the age of 79)	
John Shrapnel	1942 – 2020	English actor	
Donald Siden	1923 – 2014	English actor; died at the age of 90 after suffering from prostate cancer for several years	
Stirling Silliphant	1918 – 2006	American screenwriter and producer (died at the age of 78 after being hospitalized for several months with prostate cancer)	
Stu Silver	1947 – 2023	American screenwriter and television writer	
C. R. Simha	1942 – 2014	Indian actor, director, dramatist, and playwright (died at the age of 71 after being hospitalized with prostate cancer on February 27, 2014. He was suffering from prostate cancer for about 18 months)	
Tom Sherak	1945 – 2014	American film producer; died at the age of 68 after battling prostate cancer for about 12 years	
Vladimir Soshalsky	1929 – 2007	Soviet-born Russian actor	
Victor Spinetti	1929 – 2012	Welsh actor, author, poet, and raconteur (diagnosed with prostate cancer in February 2011 after collapsing on stage during a Valentine's Day performance. Died a year later at the age of 82)	
Ben Stiller	1965 – present	American actor, filmmaker, and comedian (diagnosed with an aggressive form of prostate cancer after a prostate-specific antigen test in June 2014. He underwent a prostatectomy which removed his cancer. Stiller revealed his diagnosis publicly in 2016)	
Dean Sullivan	1955 – 2023	English actor (died at the age of 68 after being diagnosed in 2018. Sullivan began experiencing abnormalities in urination, which led to his diagnosis after multiple tests)	
Robert Symonds	1926 – 2007	American actor	
Bud Tingwell	1923 – 2009	Australian actor	
Jean-Louis Trintignant	1930 – 2022	French actor (died at the age of 91 after being diagnosed in 2018. He reportedly did not seek treatment for his prostate cancer)	
James Michael Tyler	1962 – 2021	American actor (diagnosed with stage 4 prostate cancer in September 2018. His cancer had spread to bones and rendered him unable to walk before his death. He died at the age of 59 about 3 years after his diagnosis)	
Jukka Virtanen	1933 – 2019	Finnish director, actor, host, and writer (died at the age of 86 after battling prostate cancer for several years. In 2015, his cancer had metastasized to his bones and by spring 2015, Virtanen was given a year left to live. He would live for another four years before succumbing to his illness)	
David Watkin	1925 – 2008	English cinematographer; diagnosed six months before his death at age 82	
Bobs Watson	1930 – 1999	American actor and Methodist minister	
Delmar Watson	1926 – 2008	American child actor and news photographer	
Dennis Weaver	1924 – 2006	American actor and president of the Screen Actors Guild (died at the age of 81 in February 2006 after being diagnosed with prostate cancer in 1991)	
Samuel E. Wright	1946 – 2021	American actor	
Rudy Wowor	1941 – 2018	Dutch Indonesian actor and dancer	

== Arts ==
Name	Lifetime	Comments	Reference(s)
Lennart Anderson	1928 – 2015	American painter	
Leonard Andrews	1925 – 2009	American publisher and art collector	
Robert Beauchamp	1923 – 1995	American painter and educator	
Franta Belsky	1921 – 2000	Czech sculptor	
James Cahill	1926 – 2014	American art collector and historian	
Fred Cress	1938 – 2009	British painter (died at the age of 71 from metastatic prostate cancer that spread to his spine, lungs, and liver. He was diagnosed 7 years prior to his death)	
Ric Estrada	1928 – 2009	Cuban-American comic book artist	
Gene Federico	1918 – 1999	American graphic designer and advertising executive	
Sam Francis	1923 – 1994	American painter and printmaker	
Boscoe Holder	1921 – 2007	Trinidadian contemporary artist, dancer, choreographer, and musician; died at the age of 85 after suffering from prostate cancer and diabetes	
Peter Jackson	1928 – 2008	Australian men's fashion designer	
Jay Jaxon	1941 – 2006	American fashion designer, costumer, and courtier	
Hank Ketcham	1920 – 2001	American cartoonist; creator of Dennis the Menace comic strip in the United States	
Cesar Legasi	1917 – 1994	Filipino National Artist for painting	
David Levine	1926 – 2009	American artist and illustrator (died at the age of 83 from complications of prostate cancer and other secondary ailments)	
Gilbert Luján	1940 – 2011	American sculptor, muralist, painter, and educator (died at the age of 71 after battling prostate cancer for about three years)	
Kazimir Malevich	1879 – 1935	Russian avant-garde artist and art theorist	
Eli Noyes	1942 – 2024	American animator	
Valerian Rybar	1919 – 1980	American interior designer	
Kenneth Snelson	1927 – 2016	American contemporary sculptor and photographer	
Frank Springer	1929 – 2009	American comics artist	

== Business ==
Name	Lifetime	Comments	Reference(s)
Gianni Agnelli	1921 – 2003	Italian industrialist and shareholder of Fiat	
Roone Arledge	1931 – 2002	American sports and news broadcasting executive; died at the age of 71 after a battle lasting over 6 years	
Joe Baum	1920 – 1998	American restaurateur and innovator	
Aditya Vikram Birla	1943 – 1995	Indian industrialist; died at the age of after being diagnosed in 1991	
Clive Bourne	1942 – 2007	British businessman and philanthropist	
Sam Breadon	1876 –1949	American executive and owner of the St. Louis Cardinals from 1920 to 1947	
Joseph Bruno	1929 – 2020	American businessman and politician	
Warren Buffett	1930 – present	American businessman, inventor, philanthropist (diagnosed with stage 1 prostate cancer in April 2012. Buffett underwent radiation therapy for the cancer)	
Jerry Buss	1933 – 2013	American businessman, investor, and owner of the Los Angeles Lakers; died at the age of 80 after suffering from metastatic prostate cancer and kidney failure	
D. Wayne Calloway	1935 – 1998	American chairman and CEO of PepsiCo, and golf course architect (died at the age of 62 after battling prostate cancer since 1992)	
Chen Din Hwa	1923 – 2012	Hong Kong industrial tycoon and philanthropist; died at the age of 89 after suffering from prostate cancer and dementia	
Bob Citron	1932 – 2012	American entrepreneur and aerospace engineer	
Gary Comer	1927 – 2009	American entrepreneur, founder of Lands' End	
Brian Goldner	1963 – 2021	American business chief executive and film producer; died at the age of 58 after receiving treatment for prostate cancer since 2014	
Victor Grinich	1924 – 2000	American businessman	
Aldo Gucci	1905 –1990	Italian personality and chairman of Gucci from 1953 to 1986	
Donald Hovde	1931 – 2002	American businessman; battled prostate cancer for about a year before his death	
Lamar Hunt	1932 – 2006	American businessman	
Henri Jayer	1922 – 2006	French vintner	
John Seward Johnson I	1895 – 1983	American businessman, son of Robert Wood Johnson I, co-founder of Johnson & Johnson	
René Lépine	1929 – 2012	Canadian businessman (died at the age of 82 after suffering from prostate cancer for at least a year)	
William Modell	1921 – 2008	American businessman and chairman of Modell's Sporting Goods	
John Mosca	1925 – 2011	American restaurateur, owner and co-founder of Mosca's (diagnosed with prostate cancer in 2002, his cancer went into remission in 2009. He died at the age of 86 two years later)	
Harold Pierce	1917 – 2008	American entrepreneur and founder of Harold's Chicken Shack	
Richard Pratt	1934 – 2009	Australian businessman and chairman of Visy Industries	
Billy Sullivan	1915 – 1998	American businessman and football owner (died at the age of 82 after battling prostate cancer for 8 years)	
David Tallichet	1922 – 2007	American businessman	
Eddie Thompson	1940 – 2008	Scottish businessman, founder, and football club chairman	
William Bernard Ziff Jr.	1930 – 2006	American publishing executive (diagnosed with terminal prostate cancer in 1978. He was initially given a few years to live. Ziff Jr. lived for about 28 more years before dying from his cancer at the age of 76)	

== Military ==
Name	Lifetime	Comments	Reference(s)
Klaus Barbie (Butcher of Lyon)	1913 – 1991	German Nazi officer; died at the age of 77 from cancer of the spine, blood, and prostate	
Ernest Radcliffe Bond (Commander X)	1919 – 2003	British soldier and policeman	
George Scratchley Brown	1918 – 1978	American U.S. Air Force General; died at age of 60 after being diagnosed in mid 1977	
Bruce W. Carr	1924 – 1998	American U.S. Air Force colonel	
Konrāds Kalējs	1913 – 2001	Latvian soldier and accused war criminal; died at the age of 88 in a Melbourne, Australia nursing home after suffering from prostate cancer and dementia,	
George L. Mabry Jr.	1917 –1990	United States Army general; died at the age of 72 after his prostate cancer had metastasized to the tissue lining of his heart	
Shaban Opolot	1924 – 2005	Ugandan military officer (died after being admitted to the hospital for prostate cancer and a mild stroke)	
Maurice H. Rindskopf	1917 – 2011	United States Navy officer and Rear Admiral	
Charles Calvin Rogers	1929 – 1990	United States Army officer	
Konstantin Rokossovsky	1896 – 1968	Soviet and Polish military officer, Marshal of the Soviet Union and Poland (died at the age of 71 after suffering from prostate cancer and a cardiovascular condition)	
Umrao Singh	1920 – 2005	Indian army officer and recipient of the Victoria Cross (died at the age of 85 after being diagnosed in July 2005. Despite undergoing immediate surgery, his cancer metastasized to his bones and other organs.)	
Paul Touvier	1915 – 1995	French Nazi collaborator	
Robert Truax	1917 – 2010	American United States Navy rocket engineer	
Hoyt Vandenberg	1899 – 1954	United States Air Force General (diagnosed with prostate cancer during a physical examination in May 1952 and promptly had surgery on his cancer. Vandenberg would not reveal his diagnosis publicly and would retire in 1953. He died at the age of 55 about two years later)	
William B. Walsh	1920 – 1996	American military physician and founder of Project HOPE	
John Wilton	1910 – 1981	Australian Army senior commander	

== Miscellaneous ==
Name	Lifetime	Comments	Reference(s)
George Anastaplo	1925 – 2014	American professor and author	
Leonard Andrews	1925 – 2009	American publisher and art collector	
Diogenes Angelakos	1919 – 1997	American engineer and professor; died at the age of 77 after a diagnosis six years prior	
Michael Aris	1946 – 1999	British historian; died on his birthday at the age of 53 after being terminally diagnosed two months before his death	
George Ballis	1925 – 2010	American photographer and activist	
George Becker	1928 – 2007	American labor leader	
Dennis Brutus	1924 – 2009	South African activist, educator, and journalist; died at the age 85 after battling prostate cancer for about a year	
George Carman	1929 – 2001	English barrister; died at the age of 71 after being diagnosed in September 2000	
Stokely Carmichael	1941 – 1998	American civil rights organizer; died at the age of 57 after being diagnosed with prostate cancer in 1985	
Frank Crichlow	1932 – 2010	British community activist and civil rights campaigner	
Enrico Cuccia	1907 – 2000	Italian banker	
Billy Dainty	1927 – 1986	British comedian and dancer	
James DeAnda	1925 – 2006	American attorney and judge	
Denis Dutton	1944 – 2010	American philosopher and professor	
Benjamin Edwards	1931 – 2009	American stockbroker	
William K. Everson	1929 – 1996	English-American archivist, author, critic, and film historian	
Robert Fagles	1933 – 2008	American professor, poet, and academic	
Mike Filey	1941 – 2022	Canadian historian, radio host, journalist, author	
Leonard Freed	1929 – 2006	American documentary photojournalist	
Len Goodman	1944 – 2023	English ballroom dancer and teacher (Initially diagnosed with prostate cancer in March 2009. Died at the age of 78 from the disease after it metastasized to his bones)	
Beverley Goodway	1943 – 2012	English photographer (died at the age of 69 after suffering from prostate cancer and mesothelioma. He suffered from prostate cancer for years before his death)	
Nils Hasselmo	1931 – 2019	President of the University of Minnesota from 1988 to 1997; died at the age of 87 after battling prostate cancer for over 2 decades	
Rutherford P. Hayes	1858 – 1927	American librarian and son of Rutherford B. Hayes	
Jim Hazelton	1931 – 2014	Australian aviator and co-founder of Hazelton Airlines	
Howard W. Hunter	1907 – 1995	American lawyer and 14th President of the LDS Church from 1994 to 1995 (Died at the age of 87 from advanced prostate cancer that had metastasized to his bones. He was initially diagnosed in the 1980s)	
Dexter King	1961 – 2024	American civil rights activist, attorney, author, and son of Martin Luther King Jr. (died at the age of 62 after a three-and-a-half-year battle with prostate cancer)	
Espiridion Laka	1929 – 2009	Filipino lawyer and film producer	
Charles R. Larson	1938 – 2021	American literary scholar (died at the age of 83 after being diagnosed about 23 years earlier)	
Aristide Laurent	1941 – 2011	American publisher and LGBT civil rights advocate (diagnosed with advanced prostate cancer in 1996 and given a prognosis of two years left to live initially. Died 15 years later at the age of 70)	
José Limón	1908 – 1972	Mexican dancer and choreographer; died at the age of 64 after being diagnosed in 1967	
Joe Maiden	1941 – 2015	British gardener, horticulturalist, and author	
John McGillicuddy	1930 – 2009	American banking industry executive	
Abdelbaset al-Megrahi	1952 – 2012	Libyan Arab Airlines security officer convicted of the Lockerbie Bombing (diagnosed with advanced terminal prostate cancer in September 2008 and initially given three months to live. He later died at the age of 60 in May 2012.)	
Hans Monderman	1945 – 2008	Dutch road traffic engineer	
Richard A. Moore	1914 – 1995	American lawyer and diplomat	
Eadweard Muybridge	1830 – 1904	English photographer	
George Nasser	1932 – 2018	American murderer	
Maurice Natanson	1924 – 1996	American philosopher	
Jerry Nelson	1934 – 2012	American puppeteer (died at the age of 78 from prostate cancer, chronic obstructive pulmonary disease, and emphysema)	
Terry O'Neill	1938 – 2019	British photographer	
Gilberto Rodríguez Orejuela	1939 – 2022	Colombian drug lord and leader of the Cali Cartel. Also had colon cancer, COVID-19, and two heart attacks while serving time in prison.	
Joseph Papp	1921 – 1991	American theatrical producer and director (diagnosed with prostate cancer in 1987, died 4 years later at the age of 70)	
Laughlin Phillips	1924 – 2010	American museum director and magazine founder	
Gregory Powell	1933 – 2012	American criminal and murderer (died at the age of 79 from prostate cancer. Denied compassionate parole with terminal prostate cancer in 2011)	
Marcel Reich-Ranicki	1920 – 2013	Polish-born German critic (died at the age of 93 after being diagnosed with prostate cancer earlier in 2013)	
Victor Rosario	1969	Retired FDNY firefighter and first responder during the September 11 attacks in New York City.	
Mark Russell	1932 – 2023	American political satirist and comedian	
Mark Sacks	1953 – 2008	British philosopher	
John Shearer	1947 – 2019	American photographer, writer, and filmmaker	
William Shockley	1910 – 1989	American physicist, inventor, and eugenicist (diagnosed with prostate cancer in 1987. He refused to receive treatment for his cancer and it eventually metastasized to his bones and died at the age of 79 in August 1989)	
Ira Spring	1918 – 2003	American photographer, author, mountaineer, and hiking advocate (died at the age of 84 after battling prostate for about two years)	
Frank Stallone Sr.	1919 – 2011	Italian-American hairdresser and father of Sylvester Stallone	
Ruhi Su	1912 – 1985	Turkish opera singer, folk singer, and saz virtuoso	
Leslie Vivian	1919 – 2005	American academic administrator	
Vitaly Vulf	1930 – 2011	Russian critic of art, drama, film and literature, translator, and broadcaster (died at the age of 80 after being diagnosed in 2002)	
Maurice Watkins	1941 – 2021	British solicitor and sports administrator	
Eli Whitney	1765 – 1825	American inventor and creator of the cotton gin	
Peter Williams	1934 – 2015	New Zealand barrister and penal reform advocate (died at the age of 80 after battling prostate cancer for over a decade before his death)	
Ludwig Wittgenstein	1889 – 1951	Austrian philosopher	
Earl Woods	1933 – 2006	Father of American professor golfer Tiger Woods (diagnosed with prostate cancer in 1998, Woods began undergoing radiation treatment for his cancer. Died at the age of 74 in May 2006 after deteriorating health)	
Boris Yavitz	1923 – 2009	American academic administrator and Dean of Columbia Business School	
Willie York	1944 – 2019	American homeless resident of Peoria, Illinois	
Paul A. Zahl	1910 – 1985	American explorer, biologist, and writer	

== Music ==
Name	Lifetime	Comments	Reference(s)
Johnny Adams	1932 – 1998	American singer; died at age 66 after being diagnosed in fall 1997	
Jerry Adler	1918 – 2010	American harmonica player	
J. W. Alexander	1916 – 1996	American musician, songwriter, record producer, and entrepreneur	
Johnny Alf	1929 – 2010	Brazilian musician	
Alfredo “Chocolate” Armenteros	1928 – 2016	Cuban jazz trumpeter	
Bill Aucoin	1943 – 2010	American band manager; died at the age of 66 from complications following surgery for the cancer	
Mike Auldridge	1938 – 2012	American musician; died at the age of 73 after being diagnosed about a decade prior	
Sil Austin	1929 – 2001	American jazz saxophonist	
Harry Belafonte	1927 – 2023	American singer, actor, civil rights activist (diagnosed with prostate cancer around 1995 after a prostate-specific antigen test. He later received successful surgery and treatments to neutralize his cancer)	
B.G., the Prince of Rap	1965 –2023	American rapper and singer	
Barrelhouse Chuck	1958 – 2016	American blues musician and songwriter; died at the age of 58 after being diagnosed four years prior	
Tommy Bruce	1937 – 2006	English singer	
Kenneth C. "Jethro" Burns	1920 – 1989	American mandolinist and one-half of the comedy duo Homer and Jethro	
Tito Burns	1921 – 2010	British musician	
Pete Candoli	1923 – 2008	American jazz trumpeter	
Leon "Ndugu" Chancler	1952 – 2018	American drummer, composer, and producer	
Toto Cutugno	1948 – 2023	Italian singer-songwriter and musician; died at the age of 80 after being diagnosed with prostate cancer in 2007	
Lester Davenport	1932 – 2009	American harmonica player and singer	
Bobby Day	1928 – 1990	American musician, singer-songwriter, and music producer	
Dave Dee	1941 – 2009	English singer-songwriter, musician, manager, and businessman; die at the age of 67 after being diagnosed in 2001	
Johnny Douglas	1920 – 2003	English composer, pianist, musical director, conductor, and arranger	
Harry Edison	1915 – 1999	American jazz trumpeter	
Kenny Edwards	1946 – 2010	American singer, songwriter, and instrumentalist	
Neşet Ertaş	1938 – 2012	Turkish folk music singer and lyricist	
Dan Fogelberg	1951 – 2007	American singer-songwriter and instrumentalist (first diagnosed with advanced prostate cancer in 2004, with the cancer going into remission after a year. The cancer returned and he died at the age of 56 in 2007)	
Tony Fontane	1925 – 1974	American recording artist in pop and gospel music	
Jay Jay French	1952 – present	American guitarist and founding member of Twisted Sister; diagnosed in March 2018 and underwent a successful prostatectomy. He later became a national spokesperson for prostate cancer awareness.	
Robert Goulet	1933 – 2007	American and Canadian singer and actor (diagnosed with prostate cancer in 1993, Goulet would become a spokesman for awareness, early detection, and advocacy for his disease. Goulet would later die at the age of 73 in October 2007 from pulmonary fibrosis)	
R. B. Greaves	1943 – 2012	American singer	
Craig Gruber	1951 – 2015	American rock bassist	
Phil Guy	1940 – 2008	American blues guitarist	
Rob Halford	1951 – present	English lead vocalist of Judas Priest; diagnosed with prostate cancer in 2020. He underwent a prostatectomy and radiation treatment, announcing he was in remission in 2021.	
Rufus Harley	1936 – 2006	American jazz musician	
Doyle Holly	1936 – 2007	American musician	
Richard Holmes	1931 – 1991	American jazz organist; died at the age of 60 after suffering from prostate cancer and a heart attack	
Al Hurricane	1936 – 2017	American singer-songwriter	
Matt Irving	1950 – 2015	Scottish musician	
Ahmad Jamal	1930 – 2023	American jazz pianist, composer, bandleader, and educator	
Rubén Juárez	1947 – 2010	Argentine musician, singer, and songwriter (diagnosed with prostate cancer in 2008. The cancer later metastasized to Juárez's bones. He died at the age of 62 in intensive care at a hospital)	
Phil K	1969 – 2020	Australian electronic music disc jockey; died at the age of 51 after battling bladder and prostate cancer for two years	
Lee Kerslake	1947 – 2020	English musician and drummer	
Rashid Khan	1968 – 2024	Indian classical musician (died in a Kolkata, India hospital while receiving treatment for his prostate cancer. Suffered a stroke a month before his death)	
Jabu Khanyile	1957 – 2006	South African musician (died at the age of 49 from diabetes and prostate cancer. Had been undergoing radiation therapy before his death)	
Big Daddy Kinsey	1927 – 2001	American blues musician	
Joseph Kobzon	1937 – 2018	Ukrainian-born Russian singer; died at the age of 80 after battling prostate cancer for about 13 years	
Genji Kuniyoshi	1930 – 2021	Japanese singer	
Johnny Laboriel	1942 – 2013	Mexican rock and roll singer	
Danny La Rue	1927 – 2009	Irish-English singer and entertainer	
Lemmy (Ian Kilmister)	1945 – 2015	British rock musician (died at the age of 70 from a combination of prostate cancer, cardiac arrhythmia, and congestive heart failure)	
Phil Lesh	1940 – 2024	American musician and founding member of the band Grateful Dead (publicly revealed diagnosis of prostate cancer in 2006. Lesh was later diagnosed with a non-aggressive form of bladder cancer in 2015. He had surgery to remove the malignant tumors in his bladder)	
John Lewis	1920 – 2001	American jazz pianist, composer, arranger	
Terry Lightfoot	1935 – 2013	British jazz clarinetist and bandleader	
Andrew Lloyd Webber	1948 – present	English composer and impresario (diagnosed with early stage prostate cancer in October 2009. He recovered from his cancer after having his prostate subsequently removed)	
John D. Loudermilk	1934 – 2016	American singer and songwriter (died at the age of 82 from a combination of prostate cancer and respiratory illnesses)	
Peter Lundblad	1950 – 2015	Swedish singer and songwriter	
Kenny Lynch	1938 – 2019	English singer, songwriter, entertainer, and actor	
Herbie Mann	1930 – 2003	American jazz flute player (diagnosed with inoperable prostate cancer in 1997. Mann founded a nonprofit foundation against prostate cancer called the “Herbie Man Prostate Cancer Awareness Music Foundation.” Died at the age of 73 from his cancer)	
Hugh Masekela	1939 – 2018	South African flugelhornist, cornetist, trumpeter, singer, and composer (died at the age of 78 after battling metastatic prostate cancer for around a decade)	
David Maxwell	1943 – 2015	American blues singer, pianist, and songwriter (died at the age of 71 after battling advanced prostate cancer for about 8 years)	
John McLean Morris	1914 – 1993	American gynecologist, surgeon, and researcher	
Haruo Minami	1923 – 2001	Japanese enka singer and rōkyoku performer	
Melton Mustafa	1947 – 2017	American jazz musician, music educator, and arranger (died at the age of 70 after his stage 4 prostate cancer had come out of earlier remission)	
Ferdi Özbeğen	1941 – 2013	Turkish folk and pop singer	
Cecil Payne	1922 – 2007	American jazz baritone saxophonist	
Gnonnas Pedro	died 2004	Beninese singer and musician; died at the age of 61 after being diagnosed with prostate cancer nine months before his death	
John W. Peterson	1921 – 2006	American songwriter	
Johnny Ramone	1948 – 2004	American guitarist, musician, and founding member of the Ramones (died at the age of 55 after being diagnosed with prostate cancer about five years before his death)	
Cliff Richard	1940 – present	British singer; disclosed in December 2025 that he had been successfully treated for early-stage prostate cancer detected in 2024.	
Paul Richardson	1932 – 2006	American stadium organist for the Philadelphia Phillies	
Robbie Robertson	1943 – 2023	Canadian musician, guitarist, songwriter, and lead guitarist for Bob Dylan (died at the age of 80 after being diagnosed about a year prior to his death)	
Gil Robbins	1931 – 2011	American folk musician, singer, actor, and vocal coach	
Jerry Ross	1933 – 2017	American songwriter, record producer, and record label owner	
Roswell Rudd	1935 – 2017	American jazz trombonist and composer (diagnosed with stage 4 prostate cancer in 2013. He died from his cancer 4 years later)	
Teruhiko Saigō	1947 – 2022	Japanese actor and singer (diagnosed with prostate cancer in 2011, had prostate completely removed. Cancer return 6 years later and had metastasized to his bones. Died at the age of 75 11 years after his initial diagnosis)	
David Sanborn	1945 – 2024	American alto saxophonist	
Robert Sandall	1952 – 2010	British musician, music journalist, and radio presenter (died at the age 58 after being diagnosed in 2002)	
Tony Scott	1921 – 2007	American jazz clarinetist and arranger (died at the age 85 after suffering from prostate cancer for multiple years)	
Scotty (David Scott)	1951 – 2003	Jamaican reggae vocalist and disc jockey	
Clive Shakespeare	1947 – 2012	English-born Australian pop guitarist, songwriter, and producer (died at the age of 64 after being diagnosed in 2002)	
Michael Small	1939 – 2003	American film score composer	
Bill Smith	1926 – 2020	American clarinetist and composer	
Michael S. Smith	1946 – 2006	American jazz drummer and percussionist	
Waldick Soriano	1933 – 2008	Brazilian singer-songwriter (died at the age of 75 after being diagnosed with late stage prostate cancer two years before his death)	
Alvin Stardust	1942 – 2014	English rock singer and actor (died at the age of 72 after being recently diagnosed with metastatic prostate cancer before his death)	
King Stitt	1940 – 2012	Jamaican disc jockey (died at the age 71 after succumbing to prostate cancer and diabetes)	
Mighty Striker	1930 – 2011	Trinidadian calypsonian	
Pete Sutherland	1951 – 2022	American folk musician	
Feliciano Vierra Tavares	1920 – 2008	Cape Verdean American musician, singer, guitarist	
Richard Tee	1943 – 1993	American jazz fusion pianist, musician, singer, and arranger	
Karl Tremblay	1976 – 2023	Canadian singer (died at the age of 47 after battling prostate cancer for at least three years before his death)	
Domenic Troiano	1946 – 2005	Canadian guitarist and songwriter (died at the age of 59 after being diagnosed with prostate cancer a decade before his death)	
Earl Van Dyke	1930 – 1992	American soul musician	
Tom Verlaine	1944 – 2023	American singer, guitarist, songwriter, and frontman for the rock band Television	
Leon Ware	1940 – 2017	American songwriter, producer, composer, and singer (died at the age of 77 after being diagnosed with prostate cancer in the mid-2000s)	
André Watts	1946 – 2023	American classical pianist (diagnosed with stage 4 prostate cancer in 2016. He died 7 years later at the age of 77)	
Peter Wells	1946 – 2006	Australian guitarist and founder of the band Rose Tattoo (died at the age of 59 after being diagnosed with prostate cancer in 2002. He spent the last five weeks of his life in the hospital for his cancer)	
Frank Wilson	1940 – 2012	American songwriter, singer, record producer (died at the age of 71 after battling prostate cancer for several years)	
Art Wood	1937 – 2006	British blues, pop, rock singer, and lead vocalist for The Artwoods	
Frank Zappa	1940 – 1993	American musician, composer, and bandleader (diagnosed with inoperable prostate cancer in 1990 after experiencing urinary difficulties. He would undergo vigorous radiation and chemotherapy treatments for his cancer for about 3 years. He would die in December 1993 at the age of 52 from his cancer)	

== Politics and government ==
Name	Lifetime	Comments	Reference(s)
Rotimi Akeredolu	1956 – 2023	Nigerian lawyer and politician; died at the age of 67 from complications of prostate and blood cancer (leukemia)	
Ahmed Ali	1932 – 2020	Bangladeshi politician and lawyer	
A. J. Mohammad Ali	1951 – 2024	Bangladeshi lawyer and politician	
Joseph Alioto	1916 – 1998	American politician; 36th mayor of San Francisco, California (diagnosed with prostate cancer in 1991, dying at the age of 81 from pneumonia)	
Svend Auken	1943 – 2009	Danish politician; died at the age 66 in 2009 (diagnosed originally in 2004 with the cancer later going into remission and reappearing in 2007)	
Iñaki Azkuna	1943 – 2014	Spanish politician; died at the age of 71 after being diagnosed in 2003	
James Barbour	1775 – 1842	American politician and lawyer	
Marion Barry	1936 – 2014	American politician and Mayor of the District of Columbia from 1979 to 1991 and from 1995 to 1999 (diagnosed with prostate cancer in November 1995. He subsequently underwent surgery in December 1995 for his cancer. He later died at the age of 78 from hypertensive cardiovascular disease with diabetes and kidney disease as secondary causes)	
Ray Baum	1955 – 2018	American politician, lawyer, and lobbyist	
Edward R. Becker	1933 – 2006	American judge	
Zine El Abidine Ben Ali	1936 – 2019	Tunisian politician, 2nd president of Tunisia from 1987 to 2011 (died at the age of 83 after battling prostate cancer for years prior)	
Tomás Berreta	1875 – 1947	Uruguayan politician, 29th president of Uruguay	
Joe Biden	1942 – present	American politician, 46th president of the United States from 2021 to 2025 and 47th vice president of the United States from 2009 to 2017. Months after he left office in 2025, he was diagnosed with aggressive prostate cancer that had spread to his bones. The cancer is hormone-sensitive and can be controlled. However, in August 2026, his son Hunter revealed that his cancer metastasized to his bones and further.	
Herbert Blaize	1918 – 1989	Grenadian politician and 6th Prime Minister of Grenada; died at the age of 71 after being diagnosed years prior	
Bruce Boiling	1945 – 2012	American politician and businessman; died at the age of 67 after being diagnosed 4 years prior	
Robert Llewellyn Bradshaw	1916 – 1978	Saint Kitts and Nevis politician, first Premier of Saint Kitts and Nevis	
Algirdas Brazauskas	1932 – 2010	Lithuanian politician and 4th president of Lithuania from 1993 to 1998; died at the age of 77 after suffering from lymphoma and prostate cancer	
Séamus Brennan	1948 – 2008	Irish politician and government minister	
Jerry Brown	1938 – present	American politician and Governor of California from 1975 to 1983 and from 2011 to 2019 (publicly revealed to be battling localized prostate cancer with radiation treatment in late 2012. Brown resumed treatment again in January 2017. His prognosis was reported to be positive.)	
Keshav Kumar Budhathoki	died 2024	Nepalese politician; died at the age of 80 after suffering from prostate cancer for an extended period before his death	
Poseci Bune	1946 – 2023	Fijian politician, diplomat, and civil servant	
David Cameron	1966 – present	Former British Prime Minister; revealed in November 2025 that he had been successfully treated for the disease.	
William Carney	1942 – 2017	American politician; died at the age of 74 after being diagnosed 4 years prior to his death	
Winston Churchill	1940 – 2010	English politician and grandson of Winston Churchill; died at the age of 69 after battling prostate cancer for two years	
James Clark Jr.	1918 – 2006	American politician	
Rudy Clay	1935 –2013	American activist, politician, and Mayor of Gary, Indiana from 2006 to 2012; died at the age of 77 after suffering from prostate cancer for multiple years	
Tom Coburn	1948 – 2020	American politician and U.S. Senator for Oklahoma from 2005 to 2015; died at the age of 72 after being diagnosed with prostate cancer years prior to his death	
Silvio O. Conte	1921 – 1991	American politician and lawyer; died at the age of 69 from cerebral bleeding as a result of the progression of his prostate cancer	
Dave Cox	1938 –2010	American politician; died at 72 after battling prostate cancer for over a decade	
Colin Cramphorn	1956 – 2006	British Chief Constable of West Yorkshire	
Edwin L. Crawford	1925 – 1993	American politician	
H. R. Crawford	1939 – 2017	American politician and real estate developer; died at the age of 78 after suffering from prostate cancer for 20 years	
Bernard Crick	1929 – 2008	British political theorist and democratic socialist; died at the age of 79 from terminal prostate cancer	
Renny Cushing	1952 – 2022	American politician (died at the age of 69 after suffering from stage 4 prostate cancer and COVID-19. He was diagnosed with prostate cancer two years before his death)	
Ron Dellums	1935 – 2018	American politician and Mayor of Oakland, California from 2007 to 2011	
John Dingell	1926 – 2019	American politician; died at the age of 92 after being diagnosed the year prior to his death	
Bob Dole	1923 – 2021	American politician, attorney, Senator from Kansas from 1969 to 1996, and 1996 United States Republican nominee for President (underwent a prostatectomy to treat prostate cancer in 1991. He later died at the age of 98 in December 2021 from lung cancer)	
Wickliffe Draper	1891 – 1972	American political activist	
Adri Duivesteij	1950 – 2023	Dutch politician; died at the age of 72 after suffering from an aggressive form prostate cancer since 2006	
Jimmy Duncan	1947 – present	American politician (son of politician John Duncan Sr., diagnosed with prostate cancer in May 2016)	
John Duncan Sr.	1919 – 1988	American politician	
Anthony Eden	1897 – 1977	British politician and Prime Minister of the United Kingdom from 1955 to 1957; died at the age of 79 from metastatic prostate cancer	
Abulfaz Elchibey	1938 – 2000	Azerbaijani political figure, President of Azerbaijan from 1992 to 1993	
Asad Al Faqih	1910 – 1989	Lebanese diplomat	
Orval Faubus	1910 – 1994	American politician and Governor of Arkansas from 1955 to 1967	
Glenn W. Ferguson	1929 – 2007	American diplomat, university president, and Ambassador to Kenya from 1966 to 1969	
Frank Field, Baron Field of Birkenhead	1942 – 2024	British politician (diagnosed with prostate cancer about 11 years before his death. His cancer later metastasized to his jaw. Field died in April 2024 at the age of 81 after revealing his cancer diagnosis publicly in January 2023)	
Hamilton Fish IV	1926 – 1996	American politician; died at the age 70 from prostate cancer after it metastasized to his lungs following successful treatment for the cancer in the 1980s	
David B. Frohnmayer	1940 – 2015	American politician, attorney, and academic	
Dean Gallo	1935 – 1994	American politician and businessman (kept advanced prostate cancer diagnosis a secret after being diagnosed in 1992, later succumbing to the disease in 1994)	
Carl Gatto	1937 – 2012	American politician; died at the age of 74 after suffering from prostate cancer and kidney failure	
Karma Ghale	1964 – 2023	Nepali politician	
Rudy Giuliani	1944 – present	American politician, lawyer, and Mayor of New York City from 1994 to 2001 (diagnosed with prostate cancer in 2000 during a physical exam. He underwent radioactive seed implementation for his cancer in September 2000. His prognosis after treatment was reported to be good)	
Armando Guadiana Tijerina	1946 – 2023	Mexican politician, civil engineer, and businessman (diagnosed with prostate cancer in 2017. Died at the age of 77 after receiving therapy in Houston, Texas and Mexico)	
Şemsettin Günaltay	1883 – 1961	Turkish politician, historian, and Prime Minister of Turkey from 1949 to 1950	
Paul Harriss	1954 – 2022	Australian politician	
Charles Haughey	1925 – 2006	Irish politician and 7th Taoiseach of Ireland; suffered from prostate cancer for several years before his death	
Chic Hecht	1928 – 2006	American politician, diplomat, and ambassador to The Bahamas from 1989 to 1993; died from complications from prostate cancer after being diagnosed in 2005	
Ben Heppner	1943 – 2006	Canadian politician, businessman, and teacher (died at the age of 63, after suffering from prostate and bone cancer before his death. He was first diagnosed with prostate cancer in 2005, later being diagnosed with bone cancer in January 2006)	
Steve Hilgenberg	1944 – 2011	American politician	
James P. Hosty	1924 – 2011	American FBI agent	
Robert D. Houley	1927 – 2013	American politician	
Félix Houphouët-Boigny	1905 – 1993	Ivorian politician, physician, and President of the Ivory Coast from 1960 til his death in 1993 (died at the age of 88 after suffering from prostate cancer for months before his death)	
Clifford L. Jones	1927 – 2008	American politician	
Thomas R. Jones	1913 – 2006	American politician and judge	
Megat Junid	1942 – 2008	Malaysian politician (died at the age of 65 from prostate cancer that had metastasized to his lungs. He had undergone successful surgery in 2004 but his cancer returned in 2006)	
John Kerry	1943 – present	American politician and 2004 Democratic U.S. presidential nominee (diagnosed with prostate cancer in 2002, underwent successful surgery to remove his prostate in February 2003. Cancer declared in remission in October 2004)	
Richard Kerry	1915 – 2000	American Foreign Service officer and lawyer (Father of John Kerry. Diagnosed with prostate cancer 10 years before his death)	
Jackson Lago	1934 – 2011	Brazilian politician, physician, and teacher (died at the age of 76 from multiple organ failure. He was in the hospital for the past 30 days for myocarditis and prostate cancer)	
Richard Leone	1940 – 2015	American politician (died at the age of 75 shortly after being diagnosed with prostate cancer. Leone also suffered from Parkinson's disease before his death)	
James R. Lilley	1928 – 2009	American C.I.A. operative and diplomat	
Oswaldo López Arellano	1921 – 2010	Honduran politician and President of Honduras from 1963 to 1971 and 1972 to 1975	
Lester Maddox	1915 – 2003	American politician and Governor of Georgia from 1967 to 1971 (diagnosed with prostate cancer in 1983. Received non-conventional blood serum injection treatments in an attempt to boost his immunity. Suffered from a variety of ailments before his death at the age of 87, including heart disease. His death was determined to be due to pneumonia and prostate cancer)	
Ananías Maidana	1923 – 2010	Paraguayan politician, activist, and teacher (Died at the age of 87 in a hospital after being diagnosed with prostate cancer about a year before his death	
Nelson Mandela	1918 – 2013	South African politician, activist, statesman, and President of South Africa from 1994 to 1999 (diagnosed with early stage prostate cancer in July 2001. Mandela promptly began radiation therapy for his cancer for a course of seven weeks. Mandela was declared cancer free by February 2002. He would later die at the age of 95 in 2013 from a Respiratory infection)	
Frank E. Mann	1920 – 2007	American politician and Mayor of Alexandria, Virginia from 1961 to 1967	
Thomas Manton	1932 – 2006	American politician (died at the age of 73 in June 2006 from his cancer. A bill in his name called “Thomas J. Manton Prostate Cancer Early Detection and Treatment Act of 2007” was proposed on May 3, 2007)	
John Marttila	1940 – 2018	American political strategist and consultant	
Spark Matsunaga	1916 – 1990	American politician, attorney, and U.S. Senator from Hawaii (died at the age of 73 after his prostate cancer had metastasized to his bones. He reportedly ignored the symptoms and signs until the late stages of the cancer)	
Tom McCall	1913 – 1983	American politician and Governor of Oregon from 1967 to 1975 (initially diagnosed with prostate cancer in 1973, received surgery for after diagnosis . His cancer re-emerged in 1981, spreading to his bones and causing lower back pain. McCall died in January 1983 at the age of 69)	
Thomas V. Miller Jr.	1942 – 2021	American politician (diagnosed with prostate cancer in July 2018, and underwent unsuccessful androgen deprivation treatment to contain it. Diagnosed with advanced prostate cancer months later. He would reveal his diagnosis publicly in January 2019. Miller died about two years later at the age of 78)	
François Mitterrand	1916 – 1996	French politician and President of France from 1981 to 1995 (was diagnosed with prostate cancer soon after the 1981 French Presidential Election. He kept his illness private until 1992. Mitterrand died at the age of 79 4 years later after his cancer had metastasized to his bones)	
Mobutu Sese Seko	1930 – 1997	Congolese politician and President of Zaire from 1971 to 1997 (died at the age of 66 from advanced prostate cancer that had metastasized to his bones)	
Eugene Moore	1942 – 2016	American politician (died at the age of 73 after his prostate cancer had metastasized to his bones shortly before his death)	
Earle Morris Jr.	1928 – 2011	American politician	
Rogers Morton	1914 – 1979	American politician (died at the age of 64 after battling prostate cancer since 1973. Morton received radiation therapy for his cancer)	
Richard Moya	1932 – 2017	Mexican-American politician	
Robert Mugabe	1924 – 2019	Zimbabwean politician, 2nd president of Zimbabwe from 1987 to 2017 (died at the age of 95 after battling prostate cancer for years prior)	
Richard P. Myers	1947 – 2010	American politician	
Naison Ndlovu	1930 – 2017	Zimbabwean politician and deputy president of the Senate of Zimbabwe	
Pablo Neruda	1904 – 1973	Chilean poet-diplomat and politician (official reports state that Neruda died from complications of prostate cancer and cancer-related cachexia at the age of 69. Many rumors and speculations of alternate reasons for his death persist)	
Benjamin Netanyahu	1949 – present	Israeli Prime Minister; revealed in April 2026 that he was diagnosed with early-stage prostate cancer. The malignant tumor was discovered during routine follow-up after a previously disclosed surgery for benign prostate enlargement in December 2024. He delayed the diagnosis announcement due to the Iran war.	
Nik Abdul Aziz Nik Mat	1931 – 2015	Malaysian politician and Muslim cleric (died at the age of 84 after suffering from prostate cancer for at least five years)	
Joshua Nkomo	1917 – 1999	Zimbabwean revolutionary and politician (diagnosed with prostate cancer in 1996, died 3 years later at the age of 82)	
Kwame Nkrumah	1909 – 1972	Ghanaian politician, political theorist, and revolutionary	
Odvar Nordli	1927 – 2018	Norwegian politician and prime minister of Norway from 1976 to 1981	
George M. O'Brien	1917 – 1986	American politician (diagnosed with prostate cancer in the spring of 1986, died a few months later at the age of 69 in July 1986)	
Anilkumar Patel	1944 – 2019	Indian politician, educationist, and industrialist (died at the age of 73 after being diagnosed three years prior)	
J. J. Pickle	1913 – 2005	American politician and U.S. Representative from Texas (diagnosed with prostate cancer 14 years before his death. Four years before his death, Pickle was also diagnosed with lymphatic cancer. Pickle died at the age of 91 after confining to his home a month before his death)	
Lynden Pindling	1930 – 2000	Bahamian politician (died at the age of 70 after being diagnosed four years before his death)	
David Chilton Phillips	1924 – 1999	English structural biologist; died at the age of 74 after being diagnosed in 1988	
Leon B. Poullada	1913 – 1987	American diplomat and ambassador to Togo from 1961 to 1964	
Colin Powell	1937 – 2021	American politician, statesman, diplomat, and United States Army officer (Powell underwent surgery to remove his prostate after being diagnosed with early stage prostate cancer. His cancer did not spread and Powell soon became an activist for prostate cancer awareness. He died at the age of 84 in October 2021 from complications of COVID-19.)	
Orestes Quércia	1938 – 2010	Brazilian politician and Governor of the São Paulo state from 1987 to 1991 (died at the age of 72 after the re-emergence of prostate cancer in September 2010. He had battled the illness for over a decade)	
Karl L. Rankin	1898 – 1991	American diplomat	
Stu Rasmussen	1948 – 2021	American politician and mayor of Silverton, Oregon from 2009 to 2015 (died at the age of 73 in hospice care with metastatic prostate cancer)	
Alf Rattigan	1911 – 2000	Australian Public Service official and policymaker	
Robert Reich	1946–Present	American economist, professor, and author; served as the 22nd United States Secretary of Labor from 1993 to 1997. He publicly disclosed his diagnosis in February 2026, using the announcement to highlight the importance of healthcare access and regular screening.	
Stephen Rivers	1955 – 2010	American political activist and publicist	
Raul Roco	1941 – 2005	Filipino politician (first diagnosed with prostate cancer in 1996. He would have his prostate subsequently removed and his cancer would go into remission. Roco's cancer would re-emerge during the 2004 Philippine presidential election. He would later die at the age of 63 in August 2005)	
Frans Ronnes	1948 – 2017	Dutch politician	
Keith Sebelius	1916 – 1982	American politician and United States Representative from Kansas	
Domingo Siazon Jr.	1939 – 2016	Filipino diplomat	
Jón Sigurðsson	1946 – 2021	Icelandic politician; died at the age of 75 after suffering from advanced prostate cancer for multiple years	
Norodom Sihamoni	1953 – present	Member of the Cambodia House of Norodom who has been King since 2004. The Royal Palace confirmed that he underwent surgery to treat the prostate cancer in Beijing, China, on 20 April 2026.	
Mitchell Sharp	1911 – 2004	Canadian politician (diagnosed with prostate cancer in early March 2004 after fracturing his collarbone after a fall. He died later the same month from his cancer)	
William Howard Taft III	1915 – 1991	American diplomat, ambassador to Ireland, and grandson of William Howard Taft	
Andrew C. Tartaglino	1926 – 1997	American deputy chief of the United States Drug Enforcement Administration	
Edgar Tekere	1937 – 2011	Zimbabwean politician	
Pierre Trudeau	1919 – 2000	Canadian politician and Prime Minister of Canada from 1968 to 1979 and from 1980 to 1984 (diagnosed with metastatic prostate cancer at age 80. Also had Parkinson's disease. Refused treatment for his cancer. He succumbed to Parkinson's disease, dementia, and prostate cancer at his home)	
Beaton Tulk	1944 – 2019	Canadian politician, civil servant, and educator (died at the age of 75 after being diagnosed 15 years before his death)	
John V. Tunney	1934 – 2018	American politician and United States senator and representative from California	
Niel Tupas Sr.	1932 – 2015	Filipino politician (died at the age of 82 of multiple organ failure and prostate cancer)	
Al Ullman	1914 – 1986	American politician (diagnosed with prostate cancer in 1976, his cancer went into remission until 1980. His cancer had metastasized to his back. He died in October 1986 at the age of 72 from his cancer)	
Richard Vander Veen	1922 – 2006	American politician; died at the age of 83 after suffering from prostate cancer for about 14 years	
Roger Vinson	1940 – 2023	United States district judge (diagnosed with prostate cancer in 1997, his cancer would remain in remission until 2019. Was given a prognosis of three months to live in 2021. Vinson would later die in April 2023 from his cancer at the age of 83)	
John Wash Pam	1940 – 2014	Nigerian politician	
Bernard Weatherill	1920 – 2007	British politician; died at the age of 86 two years after publicly disclosing that he was suffering from prostate cancer	
Wee Kim Wee	1915 – 2005	South Korean diplomat, journalist, and President of Singapore from 1985 to 1993	
Clay T. Whitehead	1938 – 2008	United States government official	
Denis Wright	1911 – 2005	British diplomat	

== Religion ==
Name	Lifetime	Comments	Reference(s)
Ireneo A. Amantillo	1934 – 2018	Filipino Roman Catholic bishop	
John Bowden	1935 – 2010	English priest, publisher, and theologian	
Michael Evans	1951 – 2011	British Roman Catholic Bishop	
Joseph Ganda	1932 – 2023	Sierra Leonean Roman Catholic archbishop	
Billy Graham	1918 – 2018	American evangelist, Baptist minister, and civil rights advocate (diagnosed with prostate cancer during his life, he suffered from a multitude of ailments in addition, including bronchitis, pneumonia, hydrocephalus, bone fractures, and Parkinson's disease. He died at the age of 99 in February 2018)	
Curtis Hutson	1934 – 1995	American pastor; died at the age of 60 after being diagnosed in 1992	
Gordon Keddie	1944 – 2023	British-American pastor and theologian	
Jose Francisco Oliveros	1946 – 2018	Filipino Roman Catholic prelate (died at the age of 71 after suffering from prostate cancer for several years)	
Redovino Rizzardo	1939 – 2016	Brazilian Roman Catholic Bishop	
Moishe Rosen	1932 – 2010	American minister and founder and former executive of Jews for Jesus (died at the age of 77 from metastatic prostate cancer that had spread to his bones)	
Francis B. Schulte	1926 –2016	American prelate of the Roman Catholic Church (diagnosed with prostate after Hurricane Katrina in 2005. Schulte's doctors advised him to receive radiation treatment in Philadelphia after his diagnosis. He died at the age of 89 in January 2016)	
Desmond Tutu	1931 – 2021	South African theologian, bishop, and activist (diagnosed with prostate cancer in early 1997. Died at the age of 90 about 24 years later)	
Yahweh ben Yahweh	1935 – 2007	American religious leader, black separatist and supremacist	

== Science and medicine ==
Name	Lifetime	Comments	Reference(s)
Salim Ali	1896 – 1987	Indian ornithologist and naturalist	
Bernard Babior	1935 – 2004	American physician and research biochemist	
Kenneth Balcomb	1940 – 2022	American cetologist	
Jon-Erik Beckjord	1939 – 2008	American cryptozoologist, paranormal investigator, and photographer	
Francis Birch	1903 – 1992	American geophysicist	
James Black	1924 – 2010	Scottish physician and pharmacologist; died at the age of 85 after being diagnosed in 2002 with an inoperable metastatic form of the cancer	
S. Ward Casscells	1952 – 2012	American cardiologist and Assistant Secretary of Defense for Health Affairs; died at the age of 60 after battling prostate cancer for multiple years	
John Crispo	1933 – 2009	Canadian economist, author, and educator; died at the age of 75 after treating prostate cancer for 18 years before his death	
John Edgcumbe	1920 – 2001	American hematologist and medical practitioner	
Leon Eisenberg	1922 – 2009	American psychiatrist and medical educator	
Kevin Gatter	1951 – 2017	American pathologist and professor; died at the age of 65 after being diagnosed 3 years before his death	
Eugene Goldwasser	1922 – 2010	American biochemist, died at the age 88 from kidney failure as a result of prostate cancer	
Robert Goldwyn	1930 – 2010	American surgeon, author, and activist; died at the age of 79 after battling prostate cancer for 16 years	
Christian Guilleminault	1938 – 2019	French physician	
James Herriot	1916 – 1995	British veterinary surgeon and author	
Jack Hirshleifer	1925 – 2005	American economist; died at the age of 79 after being diagnosed a year before his death	
Charles Hollenberg	1930 – 2003	Canadian physician, educator, and researcher	
Lavkumar Khachar	1930 – 2015	Indian ornithologist, nature and wildlife conservationist	
William Jacob Knox Jr.	1904 – 1995	American chemist	
Timothy Leary	1920 – 1996	American psychologist, drug activist, and author (diagnosed with inoperable terminal prostate cancer in January 1995. Died about 5 months later at the age of 75)	
Julian Lewis	1946 – 2014	English developmental biologist; died at the age of 67 after battling prostate cancer for approximately a decade	
Marc Lieberman	1949 – 2021	American ophthalmologist and humanitarian	
Michael Manley	1924 – 1997	Jamaican politician and Prime Minister of Jamaica from 1972 to 1980 and from 1989 to 1992 (died at the age of 72 after being diagnosed in 1990. He had undergone multiple operations after his diagnosis)	
John Martin	1935 – 1993	American oceanographer; died at the age of 58 after being diagnosed in 1991 with metastatic prostate cancer	
Philip Majerus	1936 – 2016	American biochemist	
Charles Moskos	1934 – 2008	American sociologist; died at the age of 74 after being diagnosed with prostate cancer two years before	
Sherwin B. Nuland	1930 – 2014	American surgeon, writer, and teacher of bioethics and medicine	
Lloyd J. Old	1933 – 2011	American immunology researcher	
Noel Olsen	1946 – 2013	British doctor and public health consultant	
Frank Oski	1932 – 1996	American pediatrician	
Stanford R. Ovshinsky	1922 – 2012	American scientist, engineer, and inventor	
Linus Pauling	1901 – 1994	American biochemist, chemist, chemical engineer, peace activist, author, and educator (diagnosed with prostate cancer in December 1991. Underwent two surgeries before rejecting subsequent standard treatments. He died at the age of 93 less than 3 years after his initial diagnosis when his cancer metastasized to his liver)	
Harold E. Pierce	1922 – 2006	American dermatologist and cosmetic surgeon	
Robin Popplestone	1938 – 2004	British computer scientist, roboticist, and machine intelligence pioneer (died at the age of 65 after being diagnosed 10 years before his death.	
Bernard Rimland	1928 – 2006	American research psychologist, writer, and lecturer	
Paul Saltman	1928 – 1999	American biologist	
Anthony Sattilaro	1931 – 1989	American physician (was diagnosed with terminal metastatic prostate cancer in 1978 at the age of 49. He was given a year to live initially. Sattilaro began reading and following a book titled “A Macrobiotic Approach to Cancer.” His cancer had later gone into remission for multiple years. Sattilaro authored his own book in 1982 detailing his cancer battle titled "Recalled By Life." He ultimately succumbed to his cancer in 1989)	
James Scott	1924 – 2006	Scottish obstetrician and gynecologist	
William Shadish	1949 – 2016	American psychologist and statistician	
George A. Sheehan	1918 – 1993	American physician, athlete, and author (diagnosed with prostate cancer in 1986 that eventually became inoperable after metastasizing to his bones. He died at the age of 74 from his cancer)	
Nicholas M. Smith Jr.	1941 – 2003	American nuclear physicist	
Richard Smithells	1924 – 2002	British pediatrician and emeritus professor	
Ayhan Songar	1926 – 1997	Turkish psychiatrist and academic (diagnosed with prostate cancer in early 1997, died the same year)	
Emanuel Tanay	1928 – 2014	Polish-American physician, forensic physiatrist, and Holocaust survivor	
Norbert Untersteiner	1926 – 2012	American polar scientist	
Herbert Vilakazi	1943 – 2016	South African sociologist	
Jim Watson	1943 – 2017	American biotechnologist and entrepreneur (died at the age of 73 after being diagnosed with an aggressive prostate cancer in 2004)	
Clyde Wiegand	1915 – 1996	American physicist	

== Sports ==
Name	Lifetime	Comments	Reference(s)
Hank Aguirre	1931 – 1994	American baseball player and entrepreneur	
Tore Aleksandersen	1968 – 2023	Norwegian volleyball coach	
Chris Balderstone	1940 – 2000	English association football and cricket player	
Greg Ballard	1955 – 2016	American basketball player and coach; died at the age of 61 from prostate cancer in stage 4	
Cyril Baptise	1949 – 2006	American basketball player	
Chief Bender	1884 – 1954	American baseball player; died at the age of 70 while undergoing hospitalization for a heart attack and prostate cancer for several weeks	
Joe Black	1924 – 2002	American baseball player	
Paul Blair	1949 – 2006	American swimming coach	
Miroslav Blažević	1935 – 2023	Bosnian-Croatian football player and manager	
Björn Borg	1956 – present	Swedish tennis player; revealed in his 2025 memoir Heartbeats that he was diagnosed with an aggressive form of the disease in 2023 and underwent surgery in 2024.	
Pete Brennan	1936 – 2012	American basketball player	
Joe Brodsky	1934 – 2006	American football coach	
Brickhouse Brown	1960 – 2018	American professional wrestler; died at the age 57 in hospice after being diagnosed a year prior	
Ed Brown	1928 – 2007	American football player	
Warren G. “Freckles” Brown	1921 – 1987	American rodeo cowboy; died at the age of 66 after being diagnosed four years before his death	
Jim Bush	1926 – 2017	American track and field coach; died the age of 90 from a metastatic form of prostate cancer years after diagnosis	
Mike Campbell-Lamerton	1933 – 2005	Scottish rugby player and British Army officer; died at the age of 71 after being diagnosed in 2001	
Jean Carlos	1974 – 2024	Brazilian footballer	
Fred Carr	1946 – 2018	American football player; died at the age of 71 after suffering from prostate cancer and dementia	
Rubin Carter	1937 – 2014	American boxer	
Maurice Catarcio	1929 – 2005	American professional wrestler; died at the age of 76 after battling prostate cancer for over a decade	
Clive Charles	1951 – 2003	English football player, coach, and announcer; died at the age 51 after being diagnosed in July 2000	
Ray Clemence	1948 – 2020	English goalkeeper; died at the 72 after suffering from advanced prostate cancer for several years	
Ty Cobb	1886 – 1961	American baseball player; died at the age of 74 after suffering from prostate cancer for two years, along with other major ailments such as heart disease and diabetes	
Blanton Collier	1906 – 1983	American football coach	
Wally Cruice	1913 – 2001	American football player, coach, and scout	
Stanley Dancer	1927 – 2005	American harness racing driver and trainer	
Ben Davidson	1940 – 2012	American football player	
Glenn Davis	1924 – 2005	American football player	
Jack Doland	1928 – 1991	American football coach, college administrator, university president, and politician	
Tom Dunbar	1959 – 2011	American baseball player	
LeRoy Ellis	1940 – 2012	American basketball player	
Jack Evans	1928 – 1996	Welsh-born Canadian hockey player and coach	
John Ferguson Sr.	1938 – 2007	Canadian ice hockey player and executive	
Rod Franz	1925 – 1999	American football player and coach; died at the age 74 after being diagnosed 9 years before his death	
Larry Friend	1935 – 1998	American basketball player	
Dwight Garner	1964 – 2022	American football player	
Jake Gaudaur	1920 – 2007	Canadian football player, executive, and Canadian Football League commissioner	
Karl Geis	1933 – 2014	American martial arts instructor	
Barry Gomersall	1945 – 2007	Australian rugby league referee	
Ken Griffey Sr.	1950 – present	American baseball player (diagnosed with early stage prostate cancer after a PSA test at the age of 55 in 2006. He subsequently underwent successful surgery for his cancer. Griffey Sr. revealed that prostate cancer was hereditary in his family, with four of his uncles suffering from the disease)	
Happy Hairston	1942 – 2001	American basketball player	
Bret Hart	1957 – present	Canadian-American wrestler (announced diagnosis of prostate cancer in early 2016, underwent successful treatment for the cancer)	
Smith Hart	1948 – 2017	American-Canadian wrestler; died at the age of 68 after being diagnosed with stage 4 prostate cancer around the same time as his brother Bret Hart's diagnosis	
Stu Hart	1915 – 2003	Canadian wrestler (patriarch of the Hart wrestling family. Diagnosed with prostate cancer in the 1980s)	
Shiro Hashizume	1928 – 2023	Japanese Olympic swimmer	
Anders Haugen	1888 – 1984	Norwegian-American ski jumper; died at the age of 95 after suffering from kidney failure and prostate cancer	
Bob Hayes	1942 – 2002	American sprinter and football player; died at the age of 59 after suffering from prostate cancer, lung and kidney ailments	
Ed Herrmann	1946 – 2013	American baseball player; died at the age of 67 after battling prostate cancer for multiple years	
Fedor den Hertog	1946 – 2011	Dutch racing cyclist; died at the age of 64 after being diagnosed in 2007	
Bud Hollowell	1943 – 2014	American baseball player and manager	
Wilhelm von Homburg	1940 – 2004	German boxer, actor, and wrestler	
Chris Hoy	1976–present	British cyclist - winner of six Olympic gold medals and 11 world championships. Went public with his terminal diagnoses in Oct 2024. The following week the NHS reported a 672% increase in people seeking prostate cancer advice	
Marv Hubbard	1946 – 2015	American football player	
Ken Hutcherson	1952 – 2013	American football player and pastor; died at the age of 61 after battling prostate cancer for more than a decade	
Javier Imbroda	1961 – 2022	Spanish basketball coach and politician; died at the age of 61 after battling prostate cancer since 2016	
Bob Jane	1929 – 2018	Australian race car driver and entrepreneur	
Jesse Jefferson	1949 – 2011	American baseball player	
Alex Johnson	1942 – 2015	American baseball player	
Byron Johnson	1911 – 2005	American baseball player	
Juvenal Juvêncio	1934 – 2015	Brazilian football president and lawyer	
Kaiser Kalambo	1953 – 2014	Zambian footballer and coach; died at the age of 60 after receiving an unsuccessful surgery for his prostate cancer three weeks before his death	
Tom Keating	1942 – 2012	American football player	
Johnny "Red" Kerr	1932 – 2009	American basketball player, coach, and commentator	
Abel Kiviat	1892 – 1991	American track coach, press agent, middle-distance runner	
Benjamin Kogo	1944 – 2022	Kenyan Olympic runner; died at the age of 77 from prostate cancer after being diagnosed the year prior in May 2021	
Fred Kovaleski	1924 – 2018	American tennis player, spy, and businessman; died at the age of 93 from metastatic prostate cancer	
Terry Laughlin	1951 – 2017	American swimming coach; died at the age of 66 from complications of metastatic prostate cancer	
Frank Legacki	1939 – 2020	American swimmer; died at the age of 81 from complications of prostate cancer that metastasized	
Leroy Lewis	1945 – 2021	Costa Rican football player and coach	
Chris Limahelu	1950 – 2010	American college football player	
Joe Lis	1946 – 2010	American professional baseball player	
Arturo Macapagal	1942 – 2015	Filipino Olympic shooter	
Marcelino	1939 – 2002	Brazilian footballer	
Marinho	1957 – 2020	Brazilian professional footballer (died at the age of 63 after suffering from pancreatitis and prostate cancer)	
Press Maravich	1915 – 1987	American college and professional basketball coach and father of Pete Maravich (diagnosed with prostate cancer in 1985. His cancer was untreated before his death at the age of 71 in 1987)	
Ken McCracken	1941 – 2019	New Zealand rugby league footballer	
Gil McDougald	1928 – 2010	American baseball player	
John McGraw	1873 – 1934	American baseball player and manager (died at the age of 60 from a combination of prostate cancer and uremia)	
Peter McNamara	1955 – 2019	Australian tennis player and coach	
Ivor Mendonca	1934 – 2014	West Indian cricketer; died at the age of 79 from laryngeal and prostate cancer	
Rick Mitchell	1955 – 2021	Australian sprinter	
Khan Mohammad	1928 – 2009	Pakistani cricketer	
Eric Monti	1917 – 2009	American professional golfer	
Jimmy Murray	1935 – 2008	English footballer	
Henk Nienhuis	1941 – 2017	Dutch footballer and manager (was diagnosed with prostate cancer in September 2012. Died less than 5 years later at the age of 75)	
Jonny Nilsson	1943 – 2022	Swedish speed skater (died at the age of 79 after deterioration of his health during his battle of prostate cancer)	
David Oakley	1945 – 2006	American professional golfer (initially diagnosed with prostate cancer at the age of 50. Oakley spent an estimated 20,000 dollars in battling his illness, which included the removal of his prostate. Cancer had returned in January 2006 and he died about 7 months later at the age of 61)	
Les Olive	1928 – 2006	English football player	
Wanderley Paiva	1946 – 2023	Brazilian football player and coach	
Arnold Palmer	1929 – 2016	American professional golfer (diagnosed with early stage prostate cancer in early 1997. He underwent a successful prostatectomy for his cancer which forced him to go on a two-month hiatus from competing until he made a full recovery. He would later die about 19 years later at the age of 87 from complications of heart disease)	
Bud Palmer	1921 – 2013	American professional basketball player (died at the age of 91 from metastatic prostate cancer after being diagnosed 21 years prior)	
Floyd Patterson	1935 – 2006	American professional boxer (died at the age of 71 after suffering from prostate cancer and Alzheimer's disease. He was diagnosed with Alzheimer's disease eight years before his death)	
Travis Payze	1946 – 2006	Australian rules footballer	
Dave Pureifory	1949 – 2009	American professional football player	
Bobby Riggs	1918 – 1995	American professional tennis player (diagnosed with prostate cancer in 1988, he founded the Bobby Riggs Tennis Museum Foundation soon after to promote awareness of his illness. His condition improved after a 1989 surgical operation for his cancer but was reportedly in ill health before his death for several months before his death at the age of 77 in October 1995)	
Andy Ripley	1947 – 2010	English rugby union international player	
Lammie Robertson	1947 – 2023	Scottish footballer	
Rolf Rüssmann	1950 – 2009	German footballer; died at the age of 58 after being diagnosed two years before his death	
Glen Sather	1943 – present	Canadian former ice hockey player, coach, and general manager of the New York Rangers. Diagnosed in 2013 and later underwent surgery.	
Al Schroll	1932 – 1999	American baseball player	
Mike Sexton	1947 – 2020	American professional poker player and commentator	
Bob Simpson	1930 – 2007	Canadian gridiron football player	
O. J. Simpson	1947 – 2024	American football player, actor, and media personality (died at the age of 76 after battling prostate cancer for multiple years. Simpson kept his diagnosis secret from public knowledge)	
Gordon Singleton	1956 – 2024	Canadian world-record holding track cyclist	
Ilkka Sinisalo	1958 – 2017	Finnish hockey player (died at the age of 58 after suffering from prostate cancer for at least three years)	
Dave Sisler	1931 – 2011	American baseball player	
A. J. Smith	1949 – 2024	American football scout and executive (died at the age of 75 after battling prostate cancer for 7 years)	
Ronnie Sox	1922 – 2006	American drag racer	
Ken Sparks	1944 – 2017	American football coach and player (diagnosed with prostate cancer in June 2012 after a routine physical examination that showed his prostate-specific antigen counts were high. He had radical surgery which involved removing his prostate two days later. Died at the age of 73 from his cancer in March 2017)	
Leon Spinks	1953 – 2021	American professional boxer (diagnosed with prostate cancer in 2019. His cancer spread to his bladder and his cancer was deemed to be terminal in November 2019. He died about 4 months later at the age of 67)	
Dimitrious Stanley	1974 – 2023	American football wide receiver (died at the age of 48 after being diagnosed with an aggressive prostate cancer at the age of 45. He advocated for people at risk for prostate cancer to receive screening)	
John Stearns	1951 – 2022	American baseball player (diagnosed with stage 4 prostate cancer in January 2022. He died at the age of 71 months later in September 2022)	
Donald Sterling	1934 – present	American attorney and businessman and former NBA owner who owned the Los Angeles Clippers. Also was reportedly diagnosed with Alzheimer's disease.	
Teruo Sugihara	1937 – 2011	Japanese professional golfer (died at the age of 74 after being diagnosed in 1997)	
Steve Sumner	1955 – 2017	English-born New Zealand footballer (died at the age of 61 after being diagnosed with an aggressive form of prostate cancer two years earlier in 2015)	
Naftali Temu	1945 – 2003	Kenyan long-distance runner	
Charlie Timmins	1922 – 2010	English footballer	
Bobby Thomson	1943 – 2009	English footballer	
Joe Torre	1940 – present	American baseball executive, manager, player, and commentator (diagnosed with prostate cancer in 1999 after a spring training physical exam. Torre then underwent prostate surgery to treat the cancer. His cancer then went into remission for several years)	
Sven Tumba	1931 – 2011	Swedish professional ice hockey player (diagnosed with prostate two years before his death in October 2011 at the age of 80)	
Harry Varner	1885 – 1970	American football coach and head football coach of the University of Virginia	
Don Vesco	1939 – 2002	American motorcycle racer and businessman; died at the age of 63 after battling prostate cancer for about a year	
Claudell Washington	1954 – 2020	American baseball player (diagnosed with prostate cancer in 2017, ceased treatments for his cancer in 2018. Died two years later at the age of 65)	
Josip Weber	1964 – 2017	Belgian footballer (died at the age of 52 after suffering from prostate cancer for about three years)	
John "Hot Rod" Williams	1962 – 2015	American basketball player; died at the age of 53 after being diagnosed six months before his death	
Bob Willis	1949 – 2019	English cricketer (diagnosed with prostate cancer after suffering from disruptions to urine flow and frequent urinary tract infections according to his wife. His prostate cancer took four and a half months to properly diagnose. Willis died three years and eight months later at the age of 70 after his cancer metastasized to his bones and lymphatic system. A prostate cancer fund in his namesake was established to raise awareness and research money for prostate cancer)	
Peter Wherrett (Pip Wilson)	1936 – 2009	Australian motorsport journalist and race car driver (died at age of 72 after battling prostate cancer since at least 2007)	
Ed Whitlock	1931 – 2017	English-born Canadian long-distance runner	
Ted Whitten	1933 – 1995	Australian rules footballer (died at the age of 62 after being diagnosed in 1991. He began advocating for others experiencing symptoms to not ignore them. Whitten retired due to the progression of his cancer in 1994)	
Phil Woosnam	1932 – 2013	Welsh association football player and manager (died at the age of 80 from complications related to prostate cancer and Alzheimer's disease)	
Wally Yonamine	1925 – 2011	Japanese-American professional baseball and football player (died at the age of 85 after a 12-year battle with prostate cancer)	
Norm Zuchin	1929 – 1999	American baseball player	

== Television and radio ==
Name	Lifetime	Comments	Reference(s)
Gay Byrne	1934 – 2019	Irish presenter and host; died at the age of 85 after being diagnosed in 2016	
Jonathan Coleman	1956 – 2021	English-born presenter, announcer, writer, comedian, and spokesperson; died at the age of 65 4 years after his diagnosis	
Tony Fenton	1961 – 2015	Irish radio presenter and DJ; died at the age of 53 after battling prostate cancer since 2010	
Joe Franklin	1926 – 2015	American radio and television host and personality, author, and actor	
Merv Griffin	1925 – 2007	American television host and media mogul (died at the age of 82 after battling prostate cancer for several years. His cancer initially went into remission in 1996 but had returned)	
Huell Howser	1945 – 2013	American television personality, actor, producer, writer, and singer	
Joe Madison	1944 – 2024	American radio talk show host and activist (diagnosed with prostate cancer in 2009. Died at the age of 74 after the cancer went into remission and then re-emerged)	
Bruce Mansfield	1944 – 2016	Television and radio personality and narrator	
Julio Martínez	1923 – 2008	Chilean sports commentator (died at the age of 84 from bilateral bronchial pneumonia. He was also suffering from prostate cancer, which he was diagnosed with twelve years earlier)	
Captain Jack McCarthy	1914 – 1996	Radio announcer and host	
John McLaughlin	1927 – 2016	American television personality, host, and political commentator (died at the age of 89 from metastatic prostate cancer after suffering from the cancer for an extended period of time)	
Johnny Midnight	1941 – 2014	Filipino television and radio broadcaster	
Gary Papa	1954 – 2009	American sportscaster (died at the age of 54 after battling advanced prostate cancer for multiple years. A namesake annual Father's Day Run is organized in his honor to raise awareness and funds against prostate cancer)	
Bill Shadel	1908 – 2005	American news anchor, broadcasting journalist and reporter	
David Sheehan	1938 – 2020	American broadcaster, interviewer, host, and reporter (suffered from an aggressive form of prostate cancer and small-cell lung cancer for several years before his death at the age of 82 in December 2020 from complications of a stroke)	
Lon Simmons	1923 – 2015	American sports announcer (diagnosed with prostate cancer in October 2010. His cancer was reported to be under control in February 2013. He died from his cancer two years later at the age of 91)	
Bill Turnbull	1956 – 2022	British radio and television presenter (diagnosed with prostate cancer in November 2017. Revealed his diagnosis publicly in March 2018. Died at the age of 66 4 years later)	
Garrick Utley	1939 – 2014	American television journalist	

== Writing ==
Name	Lifetime	Comments	Reference(s)
Scott Adams	1957 – 2026	American cartoonist and creator of Dilbert; died at the age of 68 from metastatic prostate cancer.	
Jarl Afredius	1943 – 2009	Swedish journalist and newsreader; died at the age of 66 after being diagnosed in July 2008	
Arswendo Atmowiloto	1948 – 2019	Indonesian journalist and writer	
J. G. Ballard	1930 – 2009	English writer, novelist, satirist, and essayist; died at the age of 78 after being diagnosed in 2006	
Lloyd Best	1934 – 2007	Trinidadian columnist, professor, and economist	
Norman Bridwell	1928 – 2014	American author and cartoonist; creator of Clifford the Big Red Dog book series (succumbed to prostate cancer after being hospitalized for a fall weeks before his death)	
Anatole Broyard	1920 – 1990	American writer, literary critic, and editor; died at the age of 70 after being diagnosed in August 1989	
Bill Carlson	1934 – 2008	American journalist and television anchor; died at the age of 73 after being diagnosed 18 months before his death, with the cancer spreading to his liver during this period	
Eldridge Cleaver	1935 – 1998	American writer and activist; died at the age of 62 after suffering from prostate cancer and diabetes	
Phil Collier	1925 – 2001	American sportswriter; died at the age 75 after being diagnosed in 1985	
Gregory Corso	1930 – 2001	American poet	
Robert Creamer	1922 – 2012	American sportswriter	
Julian Critchley	1930 – 2000	British journalist and politician (died at the age of 69 after suffering from a brain tumor, bone and prostate cancer. He was diagnosed with prostate cancer in 1992)	
James S. Denton	1951 – 2018	American publisher and editor	
David Dick	1930 – 2010	American journalist; died at the age of 80 after suffering from prostate cancer for 17 years	
Mike Filey	1941 – 2022	Canadian historian, radio host, journalist, and author	
Bill Flemming	1926 – 2007	American television sport journalist and announcer	
Vince Flynn	1966 – 2013	American author; died at the age of 47 after being diagnosed with stage 3 metastatic prostate cancer in November 2010	
William Gaddis	1922 – 1998	American novelist	
Charles J. Givens	1941 – 1998	American writer; died at the age of 57 after being diagnosed in 1994	
Bruce Hood	1936 – 2018	Canadian author, businessman, politician, professional ice hockey referee	
Jay Hopler	1970 – 2022	American poet (diagnosed with metastatic prostate cancer when he began writing his poetry collection Still Life. Died at the age of 51 in June 2022)	
Langston Hughes	1901 – 1967	American poet, novelist, playwright, and activist; died at the age of 66 from surgery complications for prostate cancer	
Robert Hunter	1941 – 2005	Canadian journalist, environmentalist, author and politician (died at the age of 63 after being diagnosed in 1998)	
Christopher Isherwood	1904 – 1986	English-American writer; died at the age of 81 after being diagnosed in 1981	
Sidney L. James	died 2004	American executive journalist; died after suffering from cardiorespiratory arrest and prostate cancer	
George Clayton Johnson	1929 – 2015	American writer; died on Christmas Day 2015 at the age of 86 from prostate and bladder cancer	
Barry Lopez	1945 – 2020	American writer (diagnosed with advanced prostate cancer in August 2013. Died at the age of 75 seven years later)	
Bob MacDonald	1929 – 2006	Canadian journalist and conservative columnist; died 14 years after being diagnosed	
Terry Major-Ball	1932 – 2007	British columnist, banker and media personality; died at the age of 74 after suffering from prostate cancer for multiple years	
Gregory Mcdonald	1937 – 2008	American writer	
Joe McGiniss	1942 – 2014	American writer and novelist (diagnosed with advanced prostate cancer in May 2013, died a year later at the age of 71 from his cancer)	
Harald Norbelie	1944 – 2015	Swedish journalist and writer (diagnosed with prostate cancer 11 years before his death. Cancer became terminal in early 2015 and Norbelie became unable to walk. Norbelie expressed his desire for euthanasia which is illegal in Sweden)	
Scott O'Dell	1898 – 1989	American writer	
Bernard Ostry	1927 – 2006	Canadian author, philanthropist, and civil servant	
Walker Percy	1916 – 1990	American novelist; died at the age of 74 after battling prostate cancer for at least two years before his death	
William Rapberry	1935 – 2012	American public affairs columnist (died at his home at the age of 76 after a year long battle with prostate cancer)	
David Richardson	1916 – 2005	American journalist and military soldier	
Andrew Roth	1919 – 2010	American-British journalist and biographer	
Cornelius Ryan	1920 – 1974	Irish-American journalist and writer (diagnosed with prostate cancer at the age of 50 in 1970. He died 4 years later at the age of 54 from his cancer)	
Fred Saberhagen	1930 – 2007	American science fiction and mystery writer	
John Sack	1930 – 2004	American literary journalist and war correspondent	
William Saroyan	1908 – 1981	American novelist, playwright, and short story writer	
Michael Schildberger	1938 – 2010	Australian journalist, radio and television presenter, and author (died at the age of 72 after being diagnosed in 1997)	
Irwin Shaw	1913 – 1984	American playwright, screenwriter, and novelist	
Doodhnath Singh	1936 – 2018	Indian Hindi language writer, critic, and poet	
Tom Terrell	1950 – 2007	American music journalist, disc jockey, NPR music reviewer, and promoter	
Robert Penn Warren	1905 – 1989	American poet, novelist, and literary critic; died at the age of 84 after being diagnosed with prostate cancer in 1985	
Junichi Watanabe	1933 – 2014	Japanese writer	
Peter Wells	1950 – 2019	New Zealand writer, filmmaker, and historian (diagnosed with metastatic prostate cancer in November 2017. Died at the age of 69 in February 2019 after the cancer was deemed terminal)	
Walter Williams	1864 – 1925	American journalist and educator (died at the age of 71 from prostate cancer. Williams delayed receiving treatment for his cancer in order to continue his professional career)	
Óscar Yanes	1927 – 2013	Venezuelan journalist and author (died at the age of 86 after suffering from prostate cancer since at least March 2012)	
Yeng Pway Ngon	1947 – 2021	Singaporean poet, novelist, and critic (died at the age of 73 after being diagnosed with prostate cancer in 2007. His cancer later metastasized to his colon and pancreas)	
