= Richard H. Collin =

American historian (1932–2010)

- Born: Richard Harvey Collin; March 4, 1932; Philadelphia, Pennsylvania, US
- Died: January 19, 2010 (aged 77); Birmingham, Alabama, US
- Occupations: Historian, food writer, restaurant critic
- Years active: 1969–2010
- Spouse(s): [Frances Wene] (1954-1969; divorced); Rima Drell Reck (1969–1998; her death)
- Partner: Phyllis Mayronne (2000-2010; his death)

Richard Harvey Collin (March 4, 1932 – January 19, 2010, or January 20, 2010) was an American historian, university professor, restaurant critic, and cookbook writer. He was notable for his research in the life and presidency of Theodore Roosevelt. Collin's contributions to Theodore Roosevelt scholarship included his dissertation, two monographs on Roosevelt, editing a book length collection of papers on the President, journal articles, and book reviews related to other writers' works on the President. His food writing, much of it written together with his wife Rima, included cookbooks and restaurant reviews.

== Early life and education ==
Collin was born in Philadelphia, Pennsylvania. His parents were Bernard ("Barney") Collin, a self-taught master craftsman tool and die maker, and his mother was Esther Reubens Collin.

Collin received his undergraduate degree (AB) from Kenyon College in 1954. At Kenyon College, Collin was an English major and belonged to the Middle Kenyon Association. During Collin's time in the Middle Kenyon Association, he became friends with fellow student, Kenyon graduate, and future novelist E.L. Doctorow.

Collin received his PhD from New York University in 1966. The PhD was in American Civilization, and Collin wrote a dissertation on Theodore Roosevelt. Collin's dissertation, The Image of Theodore Roosevelt in American History and Thought, 1885-1965, discusses how Roosevelt appears in both historical and popular literature during his life and after his death.

== Personal life ==
Collin's parents were immigrants from England who settled in Philadelphia. According to the announcement published in The Philadelphia Inquirer, Collin became engaged to Frances Wene in 1954. He married Wene on August 15, 1954. They were divorced in 1969. After their divorce, Wene married Robert H. Levy, an attorney. During the 1960s, Collin met his second wife, Rima Drell Reck, a professor of comparative literature at the University of New Orleans. They were married from 1969 until her death in 1998.

After Reck's death in 1998, Collin wrote Travels with Rima (2002), a memoir of his life together with Reck.

Two years after Reck's death, Collin met a widow, Phyllis Mayronne. Mayronne's late spouse, Harry Mayronne, Sr., had worked in advertising. According to Larson, the two shared a travel agent, and this agent introduced them to each other. Mayronne was to become Collin's partner during his last years. Fitzmorris writes that Collin and Mayronne met "on a European trip."

== Career as historian and university professor ==
Collin jointed the faculty at Louisiana State University in New Orleans in 1966. In 1974, the university underwent an official name change and became the University of New Orleans. Collin taught history and was a specialist on the life of Theodore Roosevelt. In his book Theodore Roosevelt: Culture, Diplomacy, and Expansion: A New View of American Imperialism, Collin seeks to correct the caricatured view of Roosevelt as the imperialist Rough Rider. Collin reminds his readers that Roosevelt was a man of various accomplishments, was well educated, was sophisticated, was a published author, and who possessed considerable interests in history, the sciences, literature, and the fine arts. In addition, Collin argues that, during Roosevelt's presidency, the United States itself became more sophisticated and cosmopolitan.

Throughout his career as a college professor, Collin published articles and book reviews in scholarly periodicals. Although there were exceptions, these articles and book reviews focused on Presidents Theodore Roosevelt and, to a lesser degree, Woodrow Wilson.

With changing mores in the 1960s, Collin went from being a conventional dresser in a business suit and a necktie to a more bohemian appearance, and he was known around the campus for wearing sandals and often wearing purple clothing. His love of purple extended to his car, as Collin owned a purple and white Cadillac, and, during the 1970s, Collin demonstrated his unconventionality by owning an Edsel.

Collin maintained longtime friendships with his former University of New Orleans students, including Michael Ledet, an artist and book designer, and Tom Fitzmorris, a food critic. In an interview after Collin's death, Ledet stated that Collin "...was an eccentric, sweet man, an intellectual in every sense of the word... [and he] ...was my best friend for 45 years."

Collin enjoyed teaching and would sometimes don costumes in his classes. For example, Collin would wear a Samurai headband, when he discussed the Japanese attack on Pearl Harbor. Collin liked to inject humor in his lectures, as well. In his American history classes, Collin would invariably discuss the attempted assassination of Theodore Roosevelt, designating this lecture in his typical tongue-in-cheek fashion as the John Schrank Memorial Lecture -- after the Roosevelt's would-be assassin. According to Ledet, Collin was a "magnificent teacher, very dramatic" and that the students "really loved him, a lot more than the restaurants did."

== Food writer ==
Collin was a restaurant critic, writing under the guise of the "Underground Gourmet." According to Tucker et al., Collin was a "great observer of New Orleans food and restaurants from 1960 to 1990..."

In 1970, Collin heard about the "Underground Gourmet" series of restaurant guidebooks, published by Simon & Schuster. Collin wrote to the publisher, asking if they would be interested in a New Orleans version, and the publisher agreed. The contract was negotiated with the help of his first wife, Frances Collin, who is a literary agent. The resulting restaurant guide, The New Orleans Underground Gourmet, published in the summer of 1970, was "the first rated restaurant guide in the city's history." According to Gene Bourg, a former restaurant critic at The Times-Picayune, Collin's book was successful for Simon & Schuster and it "...sold like hotcakes." Another food writer Mary Tutwiler said that Collin had "...a cult following; one found his book, dog-eared and gravy stained, next to the phone book in houses all over the Crescent City. He was so witty, knowledgeable and influential..." Collin's book established him as the first New Orleans restaurant critic.

Several months after Simon & Schuster published Collin's book, the New Orleans States-Item hired Collin to write a weekly restaurant column. Collin employed an elaborate rating system for the quality of food at various restaurants. For exceptionally good dishes, Collin used the phrase platonic dishes – a reference to Plato and the Socratic dialogue The Republic. Collin used the designation platonic dishes sparingly. Lesser culinary offerings received ratings of highly recommended or – for more prosaic menu items – recommended.

From 1970–1980, Collin served as a columnist for the New Orleans States-Item and regularly published reviews of restaurants in New Orleans and the surrounding region. The regular newspaper column also bore the title Underground Gourmet.

Collin reviews encompassed all sorts of restaurants and cuisines, including fine-dining establishments such as well as fast-food restaurants. He was especially enamored with Po-Boy sandwiches and wrote of them at length. Collin had an intense dislike of stuffed artichokes, a dish associated with Italian restaurants in New Orleans.

Collin's work as a restaurant critic was not without controversy, however. If a restaurant received a favorable review, the restaurant owner was happy. If Collin gave an unfavorable review, restaurateurs complained, and one sent an angry letter to Collin's publisher, Simon and Schuster. Later, at a 1975 meeting of New Orleans restaurateurs, Collin's reviews "were subject to protest...", and these restaurateurs launched "...accusations that he lacked objectivity and, worse, that his wife, Rima Collin (also a UNO professor), had a professional interest in seeing some restaurants better rated than others." Generally, however, Collin was complimentary about restaurants in New Orleans. In a 1975 interview, Collin discussed restaurants in France and in New Orleans. He asserted that "I think they're equal. I miss New Orleans when in France, and miss France when I'm in Orleans." In the same interview, when he was asked if New Orleans restaurants were in decline, Collin stated, "New Orleans restaurants are not on the decline. There's as much good eating now as ever."

In one instance, a review from Collin resulted in a lawsuit. A restaurant owner, Donald James Mashburn, sued Collin, the newspaper, and the publisher for defamation over a pointed review of his restaurant, Maison de Mashburn, which was located near Hammond, Louisiana. Collin's inflammatory review appeared in the June 22, 1974 issue of the States-Item.

Collin's review began with a mixture of harsh criticism and compliments with an emphasis on the former:

"T'aint Creole, t'aint Cajun, t'aint French, t'aint country American, t'aint good. There's been a lot of fuss about this handsome new restaurant on the Covington-Hammond Rd. and more than the usual amount of letters telling me to try it. Mashburn's is an impressively setout restaurant located on a large and beautiful estate, in a fine 1907 house, with all of the amenities of a good European country inn.

I don't know how much real talent in cooking is hidden under the melange of hideous sauces which make this food and the menu a travesty of pretentious amateurism but I find it all quite depressing. The line between genius and eccentricity is sometimes a thin one but at Mashburn's it is not really in doubt for very long... "

The case made its way through the Louisiana state courts and ultimately was decided by the Louisiana Supreme Court, which issued a decision in favor of Collin on December 13, 1977.

With his spouse, Rima Drell Reck, Collin wrote The New Orleans Cookbook (1975), The New Orleans Restaurant Guide (1976 edition), The Pleasures of Seafood (1977), and the 1982 edition of The New Orleans Restaurant Guide. The New Orleans Cookbook has gone through multiple printings, has sold at least 100,000 copies, and remains in print; Associated Press book critic Cecily Brownstone called it "one of the best regional contributions we are likely to have".

== Later years and death ==
After Hurricane Katrina struck southern Louisiana in August 2005, Collin relocated to Birmingham, Alabama. Collin made periodic trips to New Orleans to eat at his favorite restaurants, and his last New Orleans appearance was at the 2008 Po-Boy Fest. He continued to reside in Birmingham until his death, however, from cancer.

== Legacy ==
Although Collin was a history professor at the University of New Orleans for decades and known for scholarship on Theodore Roosevelt, he is more likely remembered for his food writing. Collin stopped writing restaurant criticism in the 1980s, but his work continued to influence later restaurant critics such as Tom Fitzmorris. Peggy Scott Laborde, a New Orleans documentary and television host, includes an interview of Collin in her 2001 public television documentary Lost Restaurants of New Orleans.

The New Orleans Cookbook has gone through multiple printings and remains in print and The New Orleans Underground Gourmet, while out-of-print, remains a sought after book in second-hand bookstores and online auction sites. According to blogger Pontchartrain Pete, Collin's book is useful as a historical text, as it illustrates the New Orleans restaurant scene in the 1970s. According to Susan Tucker, an archivist and student of culinary history, Collin's books are "...remarkable scholarly editions with a good mix of practical culinary treasures..." and they "...remind us that food history and observations of foodways form a wonderful part of our heritage as scholars, cooks, and indeed as human beings."

As their food writing and research on New Orleans cuisine has remained influential, the 2010 Po-Boy Festival, a food festival in New Orleans, was dedicated to the memory of both Reck and Collin.

Peggy Scott Laborde dedicated her television documentary New Orleans Restaurants with a Past to Collin's memory.

Many of Collin's books, personal papers, and music compact discs are now housed at the Library of Southeastern Louisiana University. Collin's longtime friends Phyllis Mayronne and Michael Ledet were instrumental in bringing these materials to the University. This large collection reflects Collin's "wide-ranging interests." When Collin resided in Birmingham, his books "were scattered throughout his condominium and had over-flowed into a 60-foot storage unit, filling shelves on both sides of the unit." Among the items that Collin bequeathed to Southeastern University were "...more than 4,000 books on history, art, music and popular culture and 500 opera and vocal CDs. Also included are Collin's collection of books and papers associated with President Theodore Roosevelt..." Another commentator stated that the bequest included, "a large number of coffee table books on artists and art movements, a collection of books and papers on Theodore Roosevelt along with Roosevelt memorabilia, cookbooks and books on food and drink, writings on culture and taste, classic literature, and many books on baseball, one of his passions." At the time of their accession, the materials in the collection were valued at $100,000.

In addition to the materials at Southeastern Louisiana University, the Nadine Vorhoff Library at Newcomb College holds over 400 books from Collin's personal collection. These deal with culinary history and other food-related topics.

== Professional memberships ==
Collin was a member of the American Historical Association, the Organization of American Historians, the American Studies Association, and the Society of Historians of American Foreign Relations.

== Awards ==
- Penfield fellow of New York University, 1965
- American Philosophical Society grant, 1967

== Partial bibliography of publications by Richard H. Collin ==
Books

- The image of Theodore Roosevelt in American history and thought 1885-1965 [Dissertation—New York University, Graduate School of Arts and Science, 1966.]
- New Orleans Underground Gourmet, Simon & Schuster, 1970, revised edition, 1973.
- (Editor) Theodore Roosevelt and Reform Politics, Heath, 1972.
- (With wife, Rima Collin) New Orleans Cookbook, Knopf, 1975.
- (With Rima Collin) The Pleasures of Seafood, Holt, 1977.
- (With Rima Collin) New Orleans Restaurant Guide, Strether & Swann, 1976, 4th edition, 1982.
- Theodore Roosevelt, Culture, Diplomacy, and Expansion: A New View of American Imperialism, Louisiana State University Press (Baton Rouge, LA), 1986.
- Theodore Roosevelt's Caribbean: The Panama Canal, the Monroe Doctrine, and the Latin America Context, Louisiana State University Press (Baton Rouge, LA), 1990.
- Travels with Rima: A Memoir, Louisiana State University Press (Baton Rouge, LA), 2002.

Journal Articles and Book Reviews

- "Theodore Roosevelt's Visit to New Orleans and the Progressive Campaign of 1914," Louisiana History (Winter 1971) XII:5-19.
- "Henry Pringle's Theodore Roosevelt: A Study in Historical Revisionism," New York History (April 1971) 52(2):151-168.
- [Review of] "Louisiana Gothic: Recollections of the 1930s," Louisiana History: The Journal of the Louisiana Historical Association (1985) 26 (2): 212-214.
- [Review of] "The Learned Presidency: Theodore Roosevelt, William Howard Taft, Woodrow Wilson," Pennsylvania Magazine of History and Biography (April 1988) 112(2):312-313.
- "The 1904 Detroit Compact: U.S. Naval Diplomacy and Dominican Revolutions." The Historian (May 1990) 52(3):432-452.
- [Review of] "Admirals and Empire: The United States Navy and the Caribbean, 1898-1945," The Journal of American History (1992) 79(2):689-690.
- "The Big Stick of Weltpolitik: Europe and Latin America in Theodore Roosevelt's Foreign Policy," in Natalie A. Naylor et al., eds. Theodore Roosevelt: Many-Sided American, Heart of the Lakes Publishing (Interlaken, NY), 1992, pp. 295–316.
- [Review of] "The Presidency of Theodore Roosevelt," Journal of Southern History 1992 58 (4):737–738.
- [Review of] "The Wilson Era: Essays in Honor of Arthur S. Link." Presidential Studies Quarterly 1992 22 (1):172-174.
- [Review of] "Rhetorical Studies of National Political Debates, 1960-1988," Presidential Studies Quarterly 1992 22(3):604-606.
- [Review of] "US Hegemony under Siege: Class, Politics and Development in Latin America," and "A Hemisphere to Itself: A History of US-Latin American Relations," International History Review 1992 14(2):36-372.
- [Review of] "Settlement Folk: Social Thought and the American Settlement Movement, 1885-1930" Annals of the American Academy of Political and Social Science 1992 524:209-210.
- [Review of] "Pride, Prejudice, and Politics: Roosevelt versus Recovery, 1933–1938," The Historian 1992 54(4):748-749.
- [Review of] "Woodrow Wilson: A Life for World Peace," and "Wilsonian Statecraft: Theory and Practice of Liberal Internationalism during World War I," Presidential Studies Quarterly 1993 23(4):825-828.
- [Review of] "Panama and the United States: The Forced Alliance," Pacific Historical Review 1993 62(3):383-384.
- [Review of] "American Salons: Encounters with European Modernism, 1885-1917," International History Review 1993 15(4):804-806.
- [Review of] "The United States in Central America, 1860-1911: Episodes of Social Imperialism and Imperial Rivalry in the World System" Journal of Southern History 1993 59(3):552-553.
- [Review of] "Theodore Roosevelt: Many-Sided American," Presidential Studies Quarterly 1994 24(3):625-627.
- "Public Collections and Private Collectors" [Review of] "Freer: A Legacy of Art," "Splendid Legacy: The Havemeyer Collection," "From Sixteen to Sixty: Memoirs of a Collector," "Great French Paintings from the Barnes Collection: Impressionism, Post-Impressionism and Early Modern," "In August Company: The Collections of the Pierpont Morgan Library," American Quarterly 1994 46(3):448-461.
- "The Tage's Visit to New Orleans, Mardi, Gras, 1903: Changing French Naval Strategy and Carnival Goodwill," Louisiana History 1994 35(1):51-66.
- "Symbiosis versus hegemony: New directions in the foreign relations historiography of Theodore Roosevelt and William Howard Taft," Diplomatic History 1995 19(3):473–497.
- [Review of] "'Brother Woodrow': A Memoir of Woodrow Wilson," Presidential Studies Quarterly 1995 25(3):572-573.
- [Review of] "Theodore Roosevelt: An American Mind: A Selection from His Writings," Presidential Studies Quarterly 1995 25(3):570-571.
- [Review of] "Impressionism for England: Samuel Courtauld as Patron and Collector," International History Review 1996 18(1):168-170.
- [Review of] "Theodore Roosevelt and the British Empire: A Study in Presidential Statecraft," International History Review 1998 20(4):999-1000.
- "In Memoriam: Rima Drell Reck (1933-1997)." The French Review 1999 73(1):9. [The article lists Richard C. Collin as the author.]
- [Review of] "Them and Us: Questions of Citizenship in a Globalizing World," International History Review 2002 24(1):229-231.
