= Mosca's =

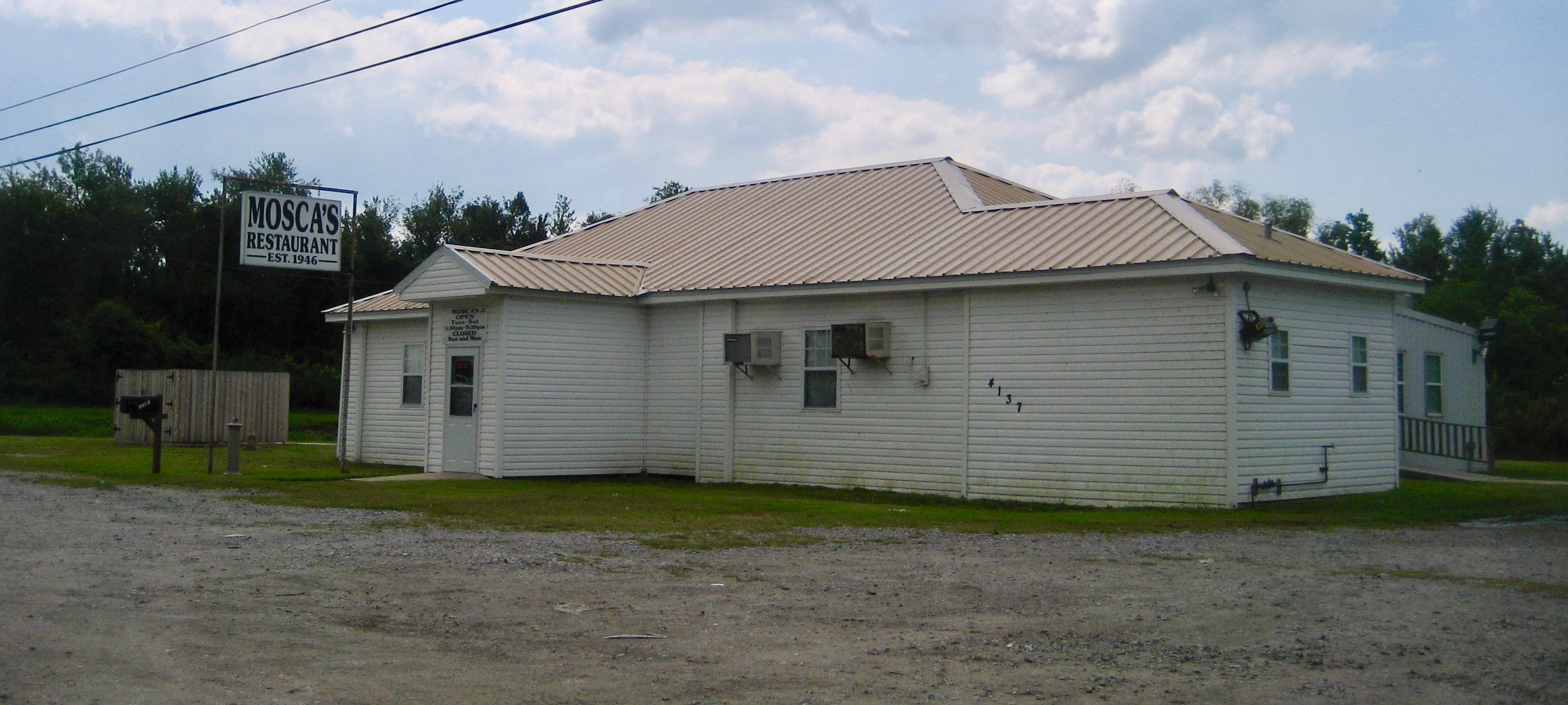
- Mosca's in 2009
- Interactive map of Mosca's

Restaurant information
- Established: 1946
- Food type: Louisiana Creole Italian cuisine
- Location: 4137 U.S. Highway 90 West, Waggaman, Louisiana, 70094, United States
- Coordinates: 29.9112°N 90.2292°W
- Website: Official Site

Mosca's is a Louisiana Creole Italian restaurant in Waggaman, Louisiana, near New Orleans. Operated by the same family since it opened in 1946, it has long been regarded as one of New Orleans' best restaurants, known for dishes such as Oysters Mosca, crab salad, Chicken a la Grande, and pineapple fluff.

== History ==
Provino Mosca, an Italian immigrant, and his wife Lisa, had a restaurant in Chicago Heights, Illinois before they moved to New Orleans in 1946, after their daughter, Mary, married a Louisiana oysterman, Vincent Marconi. They opened Mosca's in Waggaman, a remote area on the West Bank of the Mississippi River, in a building owned by New Orleans crime family boss Carlos Marcello, who became a regular customer of the restaurant. Marcello's son still owns the restaurant building. (It is also sometimes reported that Provino Mosca had been a chef for Al Capone in Chicago, but the family says this is untrue.)

Provino died in 1962. Lisa (by then known as "Mama Mosca"), two of their children, Johnny and Mary, and Mary's husband Vincent took over the restaurant. "Mama Mosca" died in 1979 and Vincent died in 2004. The restaurant was damaged in Hurricane Katrina but reopened in 2006, repaired and with a larger, air-conditioned kitchen, but otherwise mostly unchanged. Johnny mostly retired after the hurricane, but Johnny's wife Mary Jo Angelotti, who took over as chef after Mary retired, continues to operate the restaurant with other family members, including Johnny (until his death in 2011) and Mary Jo's daughter Lisa.

Mosca's received an America's Classics award from the James Beard Foundation in 1999.

During the early stages of the COVID-19 pandemic, Mosca's implemented a "takeout only" format, which inspired customers to find new ways to support the restaurant. One real estate guru was known to order Oysters Mosca "by the carload"; another couple arrived in an RV and proceeded to eat their takeout meal in the gravel parking lot, "a home-style meal in their own mobile home away from home." Eventually, Mosca's resumed normal dining room service.

== Location and cuisine ==
Mosca's is known for its out-of-the-way location, a seventeen-mile drive on U.S. Highway 90 from the Crescent City Connection bridge, and its ramshackle exterior, as well as for its distinctive Italian Creole food.

Writing in the 1970s, pioneer New Orleans food writers Richard and Rima Collin described the restaurant as "a white shack on the left in almost total isolation" and rated it as one of New Orleans' "Best of the Best", calling it "a joyous place with no airs whatsoever, bubbling over with the noise of serious eating on a massive scale" and a "New Orleans institution". They described the food's heritage as deriving from "the middle of Italy, the Romagna-Lazio region, rich in seafood." (According to the restaurant's website, Provino Mosca came from San Benedetto del Tronto, a coastal city on the Adriatic Sea in the Marche region of central Italy.)

In her New Orleans food memoir Gumbo Tales, Sara Roahen says, "Mosca's is just the sort of family-run restaurant that New Orleanians tend to covet: it's creaky, set in its ways, and no picnic to find."

In an edition of Roadfood written after Hurricane Katrina, Jane and Michael Stern comment that the restaurant seems unchanged since its reopening. They ask the rhetorical question, "can this two-room joint with the blaring jukebox really be the most famous Creole roadhouse in America?"; then they describe the experience as a "culinary epiphany", and say that "roadside food gets no better, or more garlicky, or heartier, than this."

Calvin Trillin, in a November 2010 article about the restaurant in The New Yorker, also remarks on its seemingly unchanged nature since 1946. He recounts that the Mosca family had once considered moving the restaurant to a more convenient location, but the idea had met substantial resistance from their mostly local customer base.

Reviews of the restaurant often note that almost every party orders more or less the same items from Mosca's relatively short menu, served family-style in very large portions. These popular dishes include:

- Oysters Mosca (also called Oysters Italian Style), which the Sterns call "a festival of garlic, olive oil, Parmesan cheese, and bread crumbs").
- Shrimp Mosca (also called Shrimp Italian Style), summarized by local food critic Tom Fitzmorris as "enormous, whole, unpeeled, with olive oil and tons of garlic".
- Marinated crab, served as a salad or in the shell.
- Chicken a la Grande, a simple dish cooked in a skillet with (in Trillin's words) "only salt and pepper, rosemary, oregano, white wine, and, of course, ten cloves (or is it heads?) of garlic".
- Spaghetti bordelaise, described by the Collins as "perfect homemade pasta and a remarkable, perfectly balanced oil and garlic sauce", and which Roahen calls "as much butter, oil, and garlic as your body can process without suffering a systematic failure."
- Pineapple fluff for dessert, which the Collins called "a bit of delicious New Orleans kitsch."

== See also ==
- List of Louisiana Creole restaurants
