= John Mosca =

John Mosca may refer to:

- John Mosca (restaurateur) (1925–2011), American restaurateur
- John Mosca (musician) (born 1950), American jazz trombonist
