= Susan Tucker (archivist) =

American archivist and historian

Susan Tucker is an American archivist. She was the Curator of Books and Records for the Newcomb Archives and Vorhoff Library at Newcomb College of Tulane University for over 30 years. She retired in 2015. She is a longtime member of the Society of American Archivists and is active in the Women's Collection Roundtable. She is now an archival consultant specializing in genealogy and family records.

== Early life and education ==
Tucker was born in Mobile, Alabama, and moved to New Orleans to attend Newcomb College, from which she graduated in 1972. She holds degrees in history, librarianship, and archival studies, the latter from the University of Amsterdam.

== Career ==
With other Newcomb College staff, Tucker helped found the Newcomb Archives in 1988. They found scrapbooks and student records from a vault in Newcomb Hall and the basement in the Josephine Louise House at Tulane University. Since 1988, Tucker aided in the collections gathered at the archives, forming a concentration on women who taught at and attended Newcomb, as well as the women of the Louisiana women's movement. She also worked heavily on the history of African American and white women domestic workers of the 1970s and 1980s.

While at the Newcomb Archives, she was responsible for assembling the Culinary History Collection and substantially expanded the Oral History Project. She was instrumental in the formation of the New Orleans Culinary History Group. At the Vorhoff Library, the group organized the first exhibition on Lena Richards and Mary Land, two cookbook authors from Louisiana. The group also worked on other exhibitions and bibliographies.

=== Publications ===
She has written several articles as well as reviews of articles and texts in journals such as the American Archivist. She has also edited and co-edited many books and her book, Telling Memories Among Southern Women, helped serve as inspiration for the novel and film The Help.

- "Doors Opening Wider: Library and Archival Services to Family History," Archivaria, 2006
- The Scrapbook in American Life, co-edited with Katherine Ott and Patricia Buckler, 2006
- Telling Memories Among Southern Women Domestic Workers and Their Employers in the Segregated South, 2002
- Newcomb College, 1886-2006: Higher Education for Women in New Orleans with Beth Willinger, 2012
- City of Remembering: A History of Genealogy in New Orleans, 2016
- New Orleans Cuisine: Fourteen Signature Dishes and Their Histories, 2009
- "Archival and Genealogical Cultures: French and Spanish colonial records across three centuries in New Orleans," Collections: A Journal for Museum and Archives Professionals, 2014.

=== Awards ===
- Lifetime Contribution to the Humanities, Louisiana Endowment for the Humanities, 2017
- Allen G. Noble Book award, as the best-edited book in the field of North American

material culture for The Scrapbook in American Life, 2006

- Visiting Exchange Archivist to the National Library of Scotland, 2002
- Fulbright Scholar to Iceland, 1999
- National Historical Publications and Records Commission Archival Research Fellow, Massachusetts Historical Society, 2003-2004
