= Donald Hovde =

American businessman (1931–2002)

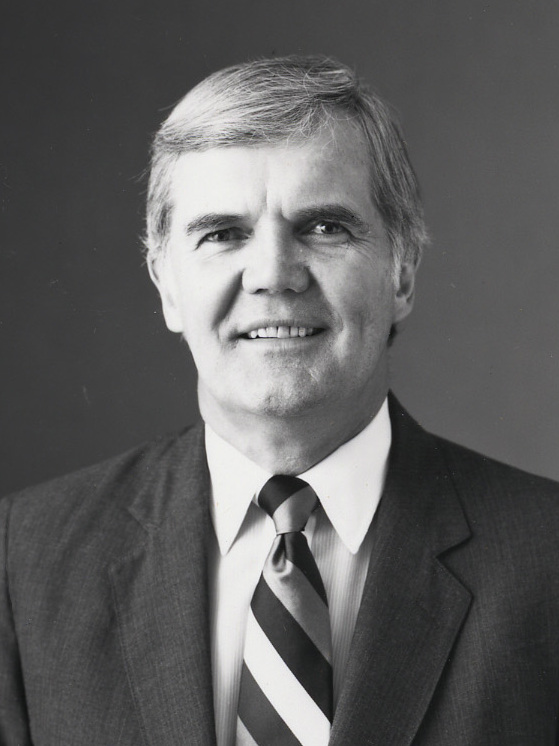
- Hovde in 1983

Member of the Federal Loan Bank Home Board
- In office May 9, 1983 – June 30, 1985
- Appointed by: Ronald Reagan
- Chairman: Edwin J. Gray
- Preceded by: Richard T. Pratt

Undersecretary of The United States Department of Housing and Urban Development
- In office January 27, 1981 – May 9, 1983
- Appointed by: Ronald Reagan
- Succeeded by: Philip Abrams

Personal details
- Born: Donald Ingvald Hovde; March 6, 1931 Madison, Wisconsin, U.S.
- Died: February 8, 2002 (aged 70) Madison, Wisconsin, U.S.
- Party: Republican
- Spouse: Eileen Bothun
- Children: Eric Hovde

Military service
- Allegiance: United States
- Branch/service: United States Air Force
- Years of service: 1950–1959
- Rank: 2nd Lieutenant

Donald Ingvald Hovde (March 6, 1931 – February 8, 2002) was an American businessman who served as a member of the Federal Loan Bank Home Board from 1983 until 1985. Prior to his appointment, he served as Under Secretary of Housing and Urban Development after his appointment in 1981.

== Early life and education ==
Hovde was born in Madison on March 6, 1931, and graduated from Madison East High School in 1949. He then attended college at the University of Wisconsin-Madison and was a member of Kappa Sigma fraternity. After he graduated, Hovde was commissioned as a 2nd Lieutenant with the Army ROTC and served as a U.S. Army Pilot before an honorable discharge in 1959.

== Career ==
Hovde began working with his father, Ingvald "Inky" Hovde in 1960, and eventually became the President of President of Hovde Realty, Inc. in 1967.

In 1962 he was elected to the Madison Board of Realtors and was designated Wisconsin "Realtor of the Year" in 1976 and was elected the youngest President, at age 48, of the National Association of Realtors in 1979. In 1962, Hovde ran for a special election in the Wisconsin Senate, but he lost the election to Fred Risser. He was then appointed by President Ronald Reagan as Under Secretary of Housing and Urban Development in 1981, where he served until 1983. President Reagan then appointed him as a member of the Federal Loan Bank Home Board to fill a vacancy until 1985.

== Personal life ==
Hovde's father, Ingvald "Inky" Hovde, immigrated to the United States from Norway. His son, Eric Hovde, ran for United States Senate in Wisconsin in 2012 and 2024. Eric also took over most of Hovde's operations. Hovde died from prostate cancer at his home in Madison on February 8, 2002, at the age of 70.
