= Ken Balcomb =

American cetologist (1940–2022)

Kenneth Chester Balcomb III (November 11, 1940 – December 15, 2022) was an American cetologist. He was a leading figure in the study and protection of orcas.

== Early life and education ==
Balcomb was born on November 11, 1940, in Clovis, New Mexico. His father, Kenneth II, would become, after his divorce, an important figure in Colorado's fight with California over water rights. His mother, Barbara Jean Bales, was a singer. After her divorce, she moved with her son to Carmichael, California. It was in California where Balcomb became enamored with the ocean. He would wander the shore of Point Reyes looking for whale bones.

Balcomb attended American River Junior College, and then transferred to the University of California, Davis. In 1963, Balcomb received a BS in Zoology from the university.

== Career ==
After college, Balcomb worked for United States Fish and Wildlife Service at one of the country’s last whaling stations located in Richmond, California.

Balcomb then worked for the United States Government as a Field Biologist in Eastern Pacific large whale research and then in Central Pacific marine bird research.

During the Vietnam War, Balcomb became a US Navy pilot and oceanographic specialist. He was assigned to listen for the underwater pings of Soviet submarines. During his hours of listening, he often heard whale song.

Balcomb started to study orcas in 1976. He studied orcas from the Center for Whale Research, located in Friday Harbor, Washington. He was also able to study orcas from "his home porch perched above Puget Sound, where the animals hunt and play in summer months". Also in 1976, he became the research director of the Ocean Research and Education Society in Gloucester, Massachusetts, and tracked humpback whales in the Atlantic.

Balcomb became adept at identifying whales. He could identify them by looking at the unique white patch behind their dorsal fin. From his home, on the northwest shore of San Juan Island, he listened to whale songs via headphones linked to hydrophones in the water. He could often identify individual passing whales by their song.

He is the research biologist responsible for discovering U.S. Navy sonar may harm orcas. In May 2003, Balcomb (along with other whale watchers near the Puget Sound coastline) noticed uncharacteristic behaviour displayed by the orcas. The whales seemed "agitated and were moving haphazardly, attempting to lift their heads free of the water" to escape the sound of the sonar. "Balcomb confirmed at the time that strange underwater pinging noises detected with underwater microphones were sonar. The sound originated from a U.S. Navy frigate 12 miles (19 kilometres) distant, Balcomb said." The impact of sonar waves on orcas is potentially life-threatening. Three years prior to Balcomb's discovery, research in the Bahamas showed 14 beaked whales washed up on the shore. These whales were beached on the day U.S. Navy destroyers were activated into sonar exercise. Of the 14 whales beached, six of them died. These six dead whales were studied, and CAT scans of two of the whale heads showed hemorrhaging around the brain and the ears, which is consistent with decompression sickness.

== Personal life ==
Balcomb married Ann Blomquist in 1961. The marriage ended in divorce. He was married three more times, all ending in divorce.

He died on December 15, 2022, of prostate cancer.
