= John Mosca (restaurateur) =

American restaurateur (1925–2011)

John Mosca (pronounced "Mohsca") (May 6, 1925 Chicago Heights, Illinois – July 13, 2011, Harahan, Louisiana) was an American restaurateur and owner (and co-founder) of the famed Mosca's, a Louisiana Creole and Italian restaurant in Avondale, Louisiana, near New Orleans.

== Early life ==
Mosca was born, raised and attended Bloom High School in Chicago Heights, Illinois. He worked for his parents, Provino and Lisa Mosca, at their local restaurant, which was also named Mosca's.

Mosca enlisted in the United States Army during World War II and served in the European Theater as an infantryman. He was wounded in action by shrapnel during battle in Italy. Mosca was awarded two Purple Hearts and a Bronze Star for his service. He was transferred to the British military forces, who assigned him as a waiter for officers and visiting dignitaries due to his restaurant experience prior to the war. He served British Prime Minister Winston Churchill and future Yugoslavian President Josip Broz Tito in 1944, when they ate together at the Villa Rivalta in Naples, Italy.

Mosca's parents and brother, Nick, moved to New Orleans during World War II because their daughter, Mary Mosca, had married a New Orleans resident named Vincent Marconi. John Mosca also moved to New Orleans following the end of the war and his honorable discharge from the United States Army.

== Restaurant ==
In 1946, Mosca and his parents opened a new restaurant, called Mosca's, in a Waggaman, Louisiana, building that was once a tavern. Mosca decided to offer a menu similar to his parents' former restaurant in Illinois, specializing in family-style platters. However, they decided to include local Louisiana ingredients and cuisine, including seafood, such as oysters and crabs. Among the newer entrees added by Mosca were marinated crab salad, barbecued shrimp and baked oysters. The menu has remained virtually unchanged since the restaurant's founding, as of 2011. Mosca's was damaged by Hurricane Katrina in 2005, but rebuilt and reopened just ten months later.

Mosca would wake up at 5 a.m. to shop for ingredients and make the pasta and sausage by hand. He worked at Mosca's consistently until approximately a month before his death in 2011.

John Mosca died from prostate cancer at his home in Harahan, Louisiana, on July 13, 2011, at the age 86. He was survived by his wife, Mary Jo Angellotti Mosca, and daughter, Lisa Mosca. His wife and daughter still run Mosca's.
