= Newcomb Archives and Vorhoff Library =

Coordinates: 29.9402°N 90.1213°W

Newcomb Archives and Vorhoff Library, named after Harriot Sophie Newcomb and Nadine Vorhoff respectively, together form a GLAM institution which is part of Newcomb College Institute, at Tulane University, New Orleans, in the U.S. state of Louisiana.

The Newcomb Archives was founded in 1988 while the Nadine Vorhoff Library was established earlier in 1975.

The Newcomb Archives preserves historical printed and manuscript materials in relation to the lives of women in general, and to the following subjects in particular:

- history of women at Newcomb College and Tulane University,
- women's education,
- women in the Gulf South,
- culinary history.

The Vorhoff Library was initially a conventional campus library which issued books and reading material to the campus students. It has now been recast as a non-circulating special collections library. This Library will work in conjunction with the Newcomb Archives and also house special collections on the subjects listed above.
