= Tom Fitzmorris =

American food writer (1951–2025)

- Born: February 6, 1951; New Orleans, Louisiana, U.S.
- Died: February 12, 2025 (aged 74); New Orleans, Louisiana, U.S.
- Spouse: Mary Ann Connell Fitzmorris (m. 1989)
- Children: 2
- Presenting career
- Show: The Food Show
- Station: WGSO 990 AM
- Time slot: 2pm – 4pm Central
- Style: Food
- Country: United States
- Website: nomenu.com

Thomas Gerard Fitzmorris (February 6, 1951 – February 12, 2025) was an American food critic, radio host and author from New Orleans. He was a Certified Culinary Professional by the IACP. He began publishing a newsletter, The New Orleans MENU, in 1977, and it continued at his website, NOmenu.com. He broadcast daily on 990 AM in New Orleans, the show aired weekdays from 2 pm to 4 pm CDT. "The Food Show" had broadcast continuously since 1975. In 2005, he helped local restaurants recover from Hurricane Katrina.

Fitzmorris died at a hospital in New Orleans of complications from Alzheimer's disease on February 12, 2025, at the age of 74.

== Bibliography ==
- 200 New Orleans restaurants: A selective guide to dining out (1981)
- The ten greatest New Orleans recipes: & a hundred more (1984)
- La Cucina Di Andrea's New Orleans Extra-virgin Recipes (Editor) (1989)
- The New Orleans Eat Book (1991)
- The Eclectic Gourmet Guide to New Orleans (2001)
- Tom Fitzmorris's New Orleans Food: More Than 225 of the city's Best Recipes to Cook at Home (2006); 2018, revised & expanded, edition (with foreword by Emeril Lagasse)
- The Unofficial Guide to New Orleans (w/Eve Zibart & Will Coviello) (2007)
- Tom Fitzmorris's Hungry Town: A Culinary History of New Orleans, the City Where Food Is Almost Everything (2010) 2014 pbk edition
