= Kendric Pryor =

American football player (born 1998)

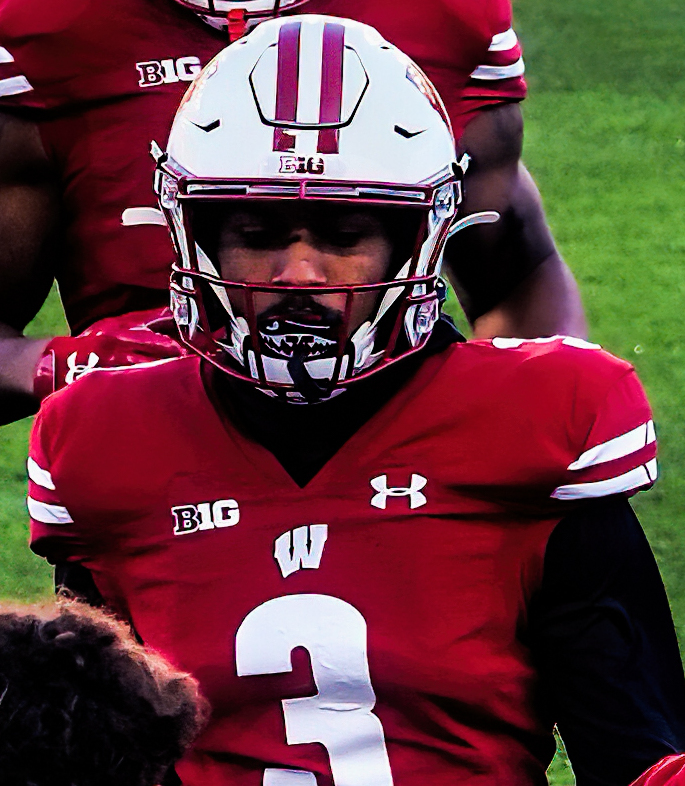
- Pryor at Wisconsin in 2019

Profile
- Position: Wide receiver

Personal information
- Born: January 6, 1998 (age 28); Hazel Crest, Illinois, U.S.
- Listed height: 5 ft 11 in (1.80 m)
- Listed weight: 189 lb (86 kg)

Career information
- High school: Homewood-Flossmoor (Flossmoor, Illinois)
- College: Wisconsin (2016–2021)
- NFL draft: 2022: undrafted

Career history
- Cincinnati Bengals (2022)*; Jacksonville Jaguars (2022); Cincinnati Bengals (2023–2025)
- * Offseason or practice squad member only

Career NFL statistics as of 2024
- Receptions: 1
- Receiving yards: 9
- Stats at Pro Football Reference

Kendric Pryor (born January 6, 1998) is an American professional football wide receiver. He played college football for the Wisconsin Badgers.

== College career ==
Pryor played college football at the University of Wisconsin–Madison from 2016 to 2021. During his career, he had 99 receptions for 1,265 yards and seven touchdowns.

== Professional career ==
Pre-draft measurables
Height	Weight	Arm length	Hand span	Wingspan	40-yard dash	10-yard split	20-yard split	20-yard shuttle	Three-cone drill	Vertical jump	Broad jump	Bench press
5 ft 10 1/2 in (1.79 m)	183 lb (83 kg)	30 3/4 in (0.78 m)	9 1/4 in (0.23 m)	6 ft 1 5/8 in (1.87 m)	4.56 s	1.56 s	2.73 s	4.29 s	6.96 s	38.5 in (0.98 m)	10 ft 11 in (3.33 m)	11 reps
All values from Pro Day

=== Cincinnati Bengals ===
Pryor signed with the Cincinnati Bengals as an undrafted free agent in 2022. He was waived by the team on August 30, 2022.

=== Jacksonville Jaguars ===
On August 31, 2022, Pryor was claimed off waivers by the Jacksonville Jaguars. He was often ruled as a healthy inactive for several games throughout the season.

On August 29, 2023, Pryor was waived by the Jaguars during final roster cuts.

=== Cincinnati Bengals (second stint) ===
On October 3, 2023, Pryor was signed to the Cincinnati Bengals' practice squad. Following the end of the regular season, the Bengals signed him to a reserve/future contract on January 8, 2024.

Pryor was waived by the Bengals on August 27, 2024, and re-signed to the practice squad. He signed a reserve/future contract on January 7, 2025.

On August 26, 2025, Pryor was waived by the Bengals as part of final roster cuts and re-signed to the practice squad on September 16.

Pryor re-signed with the Bengals on February 18, 2026. On August 30, he was waived by Cincinnati as a part of final roster cuts.
