= Homewood, Illinois =

- Village
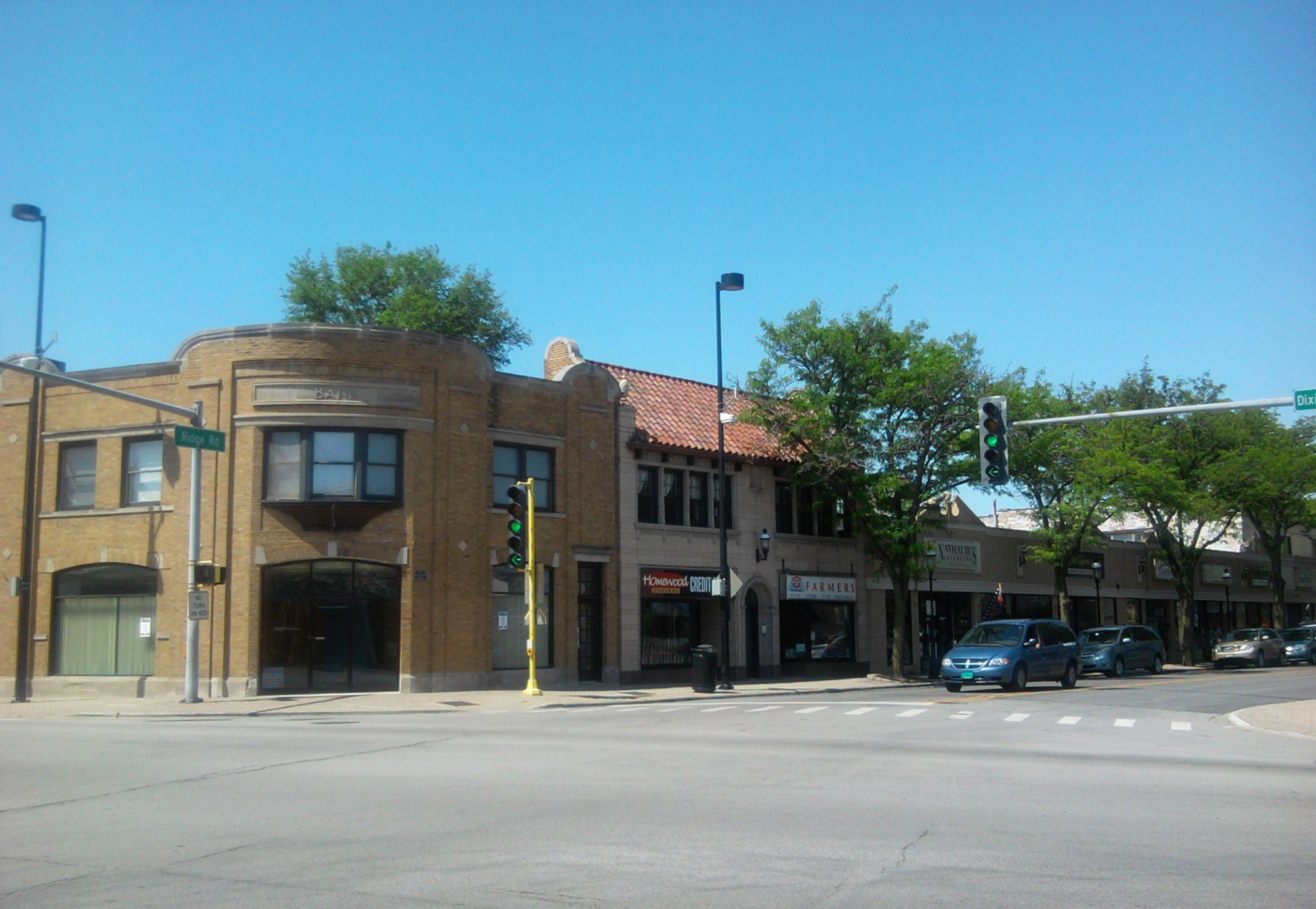
- Downtown Homewood

- logo

- Location of Homewood in Cook County, Illinois.

- Location within Chicago metropolitan area Location within Illinois Location within the United States
- Coordinates: 41°33′26″N 87°39′56″W
- Country: United States
- State: Illinois
- County: Cook
- Townships: Bremen, Rich, Thornton, Bloom
- Founded: 1893

Government
  - Type: village
  - Village President: Richard A. Hofeld

Area
  - Total: 5.26 sq mi (13.63 km^{2})
  - Land: 5.22 sq mi (13.51 km^{2})
  - Water: 0.046 sq mi (0.12 km^{2})
- Elevation: 659 ft (201 m)

Population (2020)
  - Total: 19,463
  - Density: 3,731.5/sq mi (1,440.74/km^{2})
- Time zone: UTC-6 (CST)
  - Summer (DST): UTC-5 (CDT)
- ZIP Code(s): 60422, 60430
- Area code: 708
- FIPS code: 17-35879
- Wikimedia Commons: Homewood, Illinois
- Website: www.village.homewood.il.us

Homewood is a village in Cook County, Illinois, United States. The population was 19,463 at the 2020 census. It is a south suburb of Chicago.

== Geography ==
According to the 2021 census gazetteer files, Homewood has a total area of 5.26 square miles (13.62 km^{2}), of which 5.22 square miles (13.52 km^{2}) (or 99.11%) is land and 0.05 square miles (0.13 km^{2}) (or 0.89%) is water. A south suburban village, Homewood is 22 miles (35 km) due south of The Loop/downtown Chicago at 800 west and 18300 south on the Chicago grid system.

Homewood lies on the Calumet Shoreline. The ancient shoreline can be seen clearly as the sand ridge along Ridge Road.

Homewood is bordered by Hazel Crest to the west, East Hazel Crest to the north, Glenwood and Thornton to the east, and Chicago Heights and Flossmoor to the south.

== Economy ==
Its historic downtown centered at the intersections of Dixie Highway and Ridge road has a number of small businesses including coffee shops and restaurants, salons, a music shop, bookstore, boutique hotel, and the Homewood Science Center. Homewood's other main commercial corridor is located along Halsted street between 183rd and 175th street and is home to a number of large national chain retailers.

=== Large employers ===
- American headquarters for Canadian National Railways. Homewood's CN campus has hosted over 15,000 CN employees and has a training facility.
- Global headquarters for Tempo Global Resources (formerly Hunter Douglas Metals).
- Corporate offices for Carl Buddig & Company.
- Headquarters for Homewood Disposal residential, commercial, and industrial waste service.

== Parks and greenspaces ==
=== H-F Parks ===
Homewood's "H-F Park District" spans over 365 acres with 32 parks and recreation spaces. Homewood's unique parks include Lion's Club Park and Pool, H-F Ice Arena, Irons Oaks Environmental Learning Center, H-F Racquet Club, Rover's Run Dog Park, Extreme Scene Skate park, Millennium Park Splash Pad, Patriots Park Frisbee Golf Course, and Dolphin Lake Park and Clubhouse.

=== Izaak Walton Preserve ===
Homewood's Izaak Walton Preserve is a 193-acre open space filled with woodland, lakes, and diverse wildlife carved out from an ancient glacial lake and sandy shoreline. Roughly 4 miles of gravel walking path wind through the scenic and rolling prairie throughout the preserve. Fishing, biking, running, and dog-walking are common activities along the preserve's trail system.

== Media ==
=== Newspapers ===
The HF Chronicle is a local newspaper serving the Homewood and Flossmoor communities that started in June 2014.

=== Radio ===
WHFH (88.5FM) - Viking Radio is Homewood-Flossmoor High School's radio station based on campus.

== Government ==
=== Homewood Village Board ===
Village President: Richard Hofeld

Village Clerk: Nakina Flores

Trustee: Vivian Harris-Jones

Trustee: Jay Heiferman

Trustee: Phil Mason

Trustee: Lauren Roman

Trustee: Julie Willis

Trustee: Patrick Siemsen

Village Manager, Napoleon Haney

=== State legislature ===
Illinois State Senate

- State Senator Napoleon Harris D-Flossmoor, Illinois, 15th Legislative District

Illinois State House of Representatives

- State Representative Will Davis D-East Hazel Crest, 30th Representative District

=== Federal ===
United States House of Representatives

- Congresswoman Robin Kelly D-Chicago, Illinois's 2nd congressional district

United States Senate

- Senator Dick Durbin D-Illinois (elected 1997)
- Senator Tammy Duckworth D-Illinois (elected 2017)

== Education ==
Children in grades K-8 attend schools under the jurisdiction of Homewood School District 153, although some may attend Flossmoor School District 161 if they live west of Western Avenue and south of 183rd street. School District 153 has three schools: Winston Churchill Elementary, Willow Elementary, and James Hart Junior High School. Children in grades K-2 attend Willow, then move on to Churchill for grades 3–5, then move on to finish grades 6–8 at James Hart.

The majority of students in the area then go on to attend the local public high school, Homewood-Flossmoor High School. Homewood-Flossmoor High School is its own school district, school district 233. H-F is a three-time winner of the U.S. Department of Education's Blue Ribbon Award for excellence. HF also owns WHFH 88.5, the highest powered high school radio station with 1,500 watts.

The Roman Catholic Archdiocese of Chicago operated a Catholic school, St. Joseph School. St Joseph School closed in 2017 with a final enrollment of 64 students. Despite its closure, the St. Joseph's Athletic Association still provides athletic programs for elementary and middle school students. These sports are: Girls Volleyball, Boys Basketball, & Girls Cheer.

== Religion ==
Places of worship in Homewood include:

- Salem Lutheran Church (LCMS)
- New Zion Ministries (Non-Denominational)
- Faith Lutheran Church (ELCA)
- Abundant Grace United Church of Christ
- St. John Neumann Catholic Parish
- South Suburban Church of God
- Woodlands Community Church (Non-Denominational)
- Shir Tikvah (Judaism)

The United Methodist Church operated a church, St. Andrew United Methodist Church. St Andrew closed in 2024 with a final average worship attendance of 32. Since its closure, New Zion Ministries of Alsip has since moved into the building.

== Demographics ==
Historical population
Census	Pop.	Note	%±
1900	352		—
1910	713		102.6%
1920	1,389		94.8%
1930	3,227		132.3%
1940	4,078		26.4%
1950	5,887		44.4%
1960	13,371		127.1%
1970	18,871		41.1%
1980	19,724		4.5%
1990	19,278		−2.3%
2000	19,543		1.4%
2010	19,323		−1.1%
2020	19,463		0.7%
U.S. Decennial Census; 2010 2020

=== Racial and ethnic composition ===
Homewood village, Illinois – Racial and ethnic composition Note: the US Census treats Hispanic/Latino as an ethnic category. This table excludes Latinos from the racial categories and assigns them to a separate category. Hispanics/Latinos may be of any race.
Race / Ethnicity (NH = Non-Hispanic)	Pop 1980	Pop 1990	Pop 2000	Pop 2010	Pop 2020	% 1980	% 1990	% 2000	% 2010	% 2020
White alone (NH)	18,969	17,404	14,936	10,922	8,064	96.17%	90.28%	76.43%	56.52%	41.43%
Black or African American alone (NH)	423	1,212	3,403	6,520	8,657	2.14%	6.29%	17.41%	33.74%	44.48%
Native American or Alaska Native alone (NH)	3	13	15	17	16	0.02%	0.07%	0.08%	0.09%	0.08%
Asian alone (NH)	155	298	305	270	251	0.79%	1.55%	1.56%	1.40%	1.29%
Native Hawaiian or Pacific Islander alone (NH)	0	0	10	1	0	0.00%	0.00%	0.05%	0.01%	0.00%
Other race alone (NH)	42	41	38	56	91	0.21%	0.21%	0.19%	0.29%	0.47%
Mixed race or Multiracial (NH)	x	x	239	404	758	x	x	1.22%	2.09%	3.89%
Hispanic or Latino (any race)	132	310	597	1,133	1,626	0.67%	1.61%	3.05%	5.86%	8.35%
Total	19,724	19,278	19,543	19,323	19,463	100.00%	100.00%	100.00%	100.00%	100.00%

=== 2020 census ===
As of the 2020 census, Homewood had a population of 19,463. The median age was 42.0 years. 22.4% of residents were under the age of 18 and 18.3% of residents were 65 years of age or older. For every 100 females, there were 84.7 males, and for every 100 females age 18 and over there were 80.1 males age 18 and over.

100.0% of residents lived in urban areas, while 0.0% lived in rural areas.

There were 7,653 households in Homewood, of which 32.4% had children under the age of 18 living in them. There were 4,910 families residing in the village. Of all households, 44.7% were married-couple households, 15.1% were households with a male householder and no spouse or partner present, and 36.0% were households with a female householder and no spouse or partner present. About 28.7% of all households were made up of individuals, and 14.1% had someone living alone who was 65 years of age or older. There were 8,003 housing units, of which 4.4% were vacant. The homeowner vacancy rate was 1.5% and the rental vacancy rate was 6.7%.

=== Income and poverty ===
The median income for a household in the village was $77,013, and the median income for a family was $91,704. Males had a median income of $58,214 versus $40,314 for females. The per capita income for the village was $33,243. About 5.8% of families and 7.9% of the population were below the poverty line, including 7.8% of those under age 18 and 11.3% of those age 65 or over.

== Transportation ==
Amtrak provides rail service to Homewood. Amtrak Train 59, the southbound City of New Orleans, is scheduled to depart Homewood at 8:54 pm daily with service to Kankakee and points south through Tennessee and Mississippi to New Orleans. Amtrak Train 58, the northbound City of New Orleans, is scheduled to depart Homewood at 7:44 am daily with service to Chicago Union Station. Homewood is also served by Amtrak Train 390/391, the Saluki, daily in the morning, and Amtrak Train 392/393, the Illini, daily in the afternoon/evening. Both the Saluki and Illini operate between Chicago and Carbondale, Illinois. Metra also provides commuter rail service on the Metra Electric line between Millennium Station and University Park. Homewood is the American headquarters of Canadian National Railways including a large freight classification yard and major shop facilities.

Pace provides bus service on multiple routes connecting Homewood to destinations across the Southland.

== Notable residents ==
- Jason Benetti, sportscaster; baseball play-by-play broadcaster for Chicago White Sox and later Detroit Tigers. National baseball play-by-play with NBC.
- Sarah Bloom Raskin, 13th United States Deputy Secretary of the Treasury
- J Harlen Bretz, geologist, best known for his research that led to the acceptance of the Missoula Floods
- Jim Bouton, Major League Baseball player and best-selling author of Ball Four
- Brian Colin, video game designer (Rampage, Arch Rivals, General Chaos)
- John Doody, member of the Illinois House of Representatives. He served as Mayor of Homewood prior to his tenure in the Illinois House
- Peter Doran, geologist specializing in Antarctic climate and ecosystems. He is a native of Homewood
- Aja Evans, American Olympic medalist bobsledder.
- Manny Hoffman, member of the Illinois House of Representatives. He served as Mayor of Homewood prior to his tenure in the Illinois House
- George Nolfi, scriptwriter and producer (Ocean's Twelve, The Bourne Ultimatum, The Adjustment Bureau)
- Susan D. Page, 1st United States Ambassador to South Sudan. She was raised in Homewood
- Eugene Parker, solar astrophysicist who developed the theory of the supersonic solar wind. He lived in Homewood while a professor at the University of Chicago
- Quintin E. Primo III, co-founder of Capri Capital Partners, LLC
- Lyric Ross, Actress
- Steve Sarowitz, founder of Paylocity Corporation. He was born and raised in Homewood
- Karl P. Schmitt, herpetologist at the Field Museum of Natural History. Died from a boomslang bite in his home in Homewood.
- Jermaine Stewart, an American R&B singer best known for his 1986 hit single "We Don't Have to Take Our Clothes Off", which peaked at number five on the Billboard Hot 100. Died in Homewood
- Juice Wrld, rapper, singer, and songwriter. He was raised in Homewood after his family moved there in 1999
- Rockie Fresh, rapper
- Shawnna, rapper, daughter of Buddy Guy.

== See also ==
- Homewood Memorial Gardens
