= Manny Hoffman =

American politician (1937–2013)

Manny Hoffman (February 22, 1937 – February 27, 2013) was an American businessman and politician.

== Early life and career ==
Hoffman was born in Chicago, Illinois and graduated from Hirsch High School. He went to Northwestern University, Purdue University and to Midwest Broadcasting School. He served in the United States Air Force Reserves from 1954 to 1962. He lived in Homewood, Illinois with his wife and family and was involved with the insurance business. In 1985, Hoffman was elected mayor of Homewood to succeed Robert P. Goodley who retired from the position. Hoffman served as mayor of Homewood, Illinois from 1985 to 1991. When Hoffman stepped down as mayor in 1991, then-trustee John Doody was appointed to the position.

== State legislature ==
A Republican, Hoffman was appointed to the Illinois House of Representatives at the start of the 87th General Assembly to fill the vacancy left by the resignation of Loleta Didrickson. In the 1992 Republican primary, Carl Vandenberg, an incumbent village trustee in Tinley Park, defeated Hoffman. He left the Illinois House of Representatives in 1993 at the end of the 87th General Assembly. Democrat John R. Sheehy was his successor in the 88th General Assembly.

== Other political activity ==
After he left the House, Governor Jim Edgar appointed Hoffman as chair of the Illinois Labor Relations Board. Upon assuming office, Governor George Ryan re-elevated Hoffman to serve as the chairman of the board while retaining Mike McCormick as a board member. From March 1992 until 2002, he served as chair of the Cook County Republican Party.

== Death ==
Hoffman died in Sarasota, Florida on February 27, 2013.

== Notes ==
Illinois House of Representatives
Preceded by Loleta Didrickson	Member of the Illinois House of Representatives from the 37th district 1991–1993	Succeeded by John R. Sheehy
Preceded by Robert P. Goodley	Mayor of Homewood, Illinois; 1985–1991	Succeeded by John Doody
Party political offices
Preceded by Richard Siebel	Chair of the Cook County Republican Party; 1992–2002	Succeeded by Maureen Murphy
