= Xavier Fulton =

American gridiron football player (born 1986)

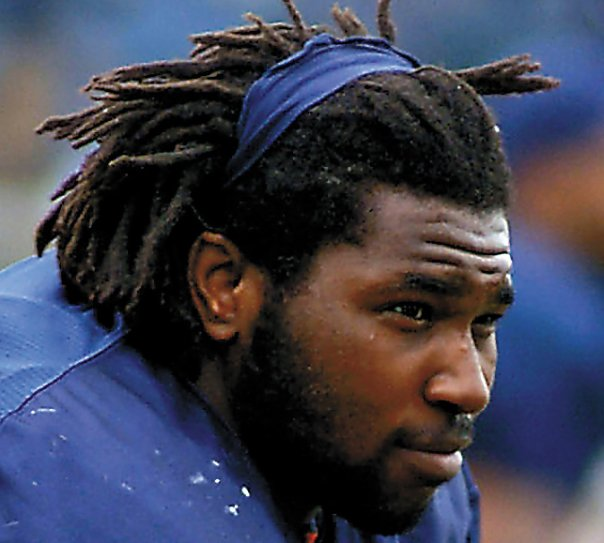
- Fulton during Illinois' 2007 spring practice.

No. 59
- Position: Offensive tackle

Personal information
- Born: April 18, 1986 (age 40); Chicago, Illinois, U.S.
- Listed height: 6 ft 5 in (1.96 m)
- Listed weight: 287 lb (130 kg)

Career information
- High school: Homewood-Flossmoor (Flossmoor, Illinois)
- College: Illinois
- NFL draft: 2009: 5th round, 155th overall pick

Career history
- Tampa Bay Buccaneers (2009); Indianapolis Colts (2010)*; San Francisco 49ers (2010)*; Washington Redskins (2010–2011)*; Virginia Destroyers (2011); Edmonton Eskimos (2012)*; Saskatchewan Roughriders (2012–2016); Hamilton Tiger-Cats (2016–2017); Montreal Alouettes (2017–2018)
- * Offseason or practice squad member only

Awards and highlights
- Grey Cup champion (2013); 2× Second-team All-Big Ten (2007, 2008); Bruce Capel Award (2008); The Times Illinois All-Decade Football Team (2010)
- Stats at Pro Football Reference
- Stats at CFL.ca

Xavier Allen Fulton (born April 18, 1986) is an American former professional football offensive tackle. He was selected by the Tampa Bay Buccaneers in the fifth round of the 2009 NFL draft. He played college football at Illinois.

Fulton was also a member of the Indianapolis Colts, San Francisco 49ers, and Washington Redskins, Virginia Destroyers, Edmonton Eskimos, Saskatchewan Roughriders, Hamilton Tiger-Cats, and Montreal Alouettes.

He was the starting left tackle, converted from a defensive end, for the Illinois Fighting Illini football team for which he also played in the 2008 Rose Bowl.

== Early life ==
Fulton played football at Homewood-Flossmoor High School from 2000–2004 for coach Tom Bailey. As a senior, he recorded 98 tackles, 58 solo stops, and 7.5 sacks, as well as, 17 quarterback hurries, three blocked field goals, three fumble recoveries, and five PBUs. Fulton was named to All-State teams by the Chicago Sun-Times, Champaign News-Gazette, and Illinois High School Coaches Association. He was also named an All-Area performer by Chicago Sun-Times, Daily Southtown, and Star Newspapers. Fulton was ranked as a Top-25 Illinois recruit by Rivals.com, ESPN, and The Insiders. He was also named SuperPrep All-Region. While at H-F, he lettered in football and wrestling. He is the son of Alma and Glen Fulton.

As one of the top defensive line recruits in the country, Fulton chose Illinois over Wisconsin, Purdue, Michigan, Michigan State, Northwestern University, Indiana, and more than 20 other top schools. He was recruited by Ron Turner and his staff.

== College career ==
As a true freshman Fulton played as a defensive end in eight games and started three, collecting six tackles, two quarterback hurries and one PBU. He recorded one solo tackle, two QBH and one PBU vs. Michigan. He also recorded tackles vs. Minnesota, Indiana, and Northwestern.

As a sophomore, Fulton played and started in the first seven games of the season before suffering a season-ending knee injury at Penn State. Before his injury he registered 13 total tackles, two tackles-for-loss, a sack, and three quarterback hurries. He had a career game at Indiana, recording three solo stops, 1.5 tackles for loss, and a blocked extra point attempt. He also recorded three quarterback hurries in the season opener against Rutgers and posted a sack against San Jose State.

For his junior year, he took a medical redshirt year to rehab his injured knee from the previous season.

In his redshirt junior year, during spring practices in 2007, Fulton moved from defensive line to offensive line, specifically, from defensive end to offensive tackle. Fulton impressed the coaches so much that in his first time playing offensive tackle at the college level, he started at left tackle for all 13 games and was in on 997 offensive snaps. He recorded a team-leading 109 knockdowns, and helped pave the way for 260 rushing yards at No. 1 Ohio State, quadrupling the Buckeyes' average rushing yards allowed. At Minnesota, he led the way for 655 total yards, the third-best single-game total in school history. At Syracuse, he led the way for 508 total yards and 378 rushing yards, Illinois' most rushing yards since 1998. At Missouri, he protected for 316 passing yards, the best Illini aerial performance since September 20, 2003, against Cal. Fulton finished the season with second-team All-Big Ten honors by both coaches and media, as well as, Rivals.com.

Fulton stayed for a fifth year and was part of an offensive line that has helped the Illini rank first in the Big Ten in total offense (448.3) and pass offense (274.5) and second in scoring offense (30.4) through 11 games. At Mizzou, he protected for 451 passing yards, the third-best passing total in Illinois history. Again, Fulton finished the season with second-team All-Big Ten honors by both coaches and media, as well as, Rivals.com. At Fulton's senior banquet, he was honored with the Bruce Capel Award for displaying the most courage, dedication and accomplishment throughout the season. Immediately following his senior year, he was invited to the 2009 Under Amour Senior Bowl and played for the North team.

In December 2008, Fulton graduated from the University of Illinois with a bachelor's degree in sociology.

== Professional career ==
=== Pre-draft ===
Fulton signed with agent Rick Smith from Priority Sports in Chicago. He trained at D1 Sports Training in Franklin, Tennessee, a facility owned by Peyton Manning. Fulton was one of only 300 top college football players to be invited to the 2009 NFL Scouting Combine in Indianapolis, Indiana. Fulton posted phenomenal results at the 2009 Combine. He finished in the top 10 (OL) in 5 out of the 6 workouts: 40-yard dash, vertical jump, broad jump, 3-cone drill, & 20-yard shuttle.

Pre-draft measurables
Height	Weight	40-yard dash	10-yard split	20-yard split	20-yard shuttle	Three-cone drill	Vertical jump	Broad jump	Bench press
6 ft 4 1/8 in (1.93 m)	302 lb (137 kg)	5.01 s	1.68 s	2.87 s	4.56 s	7.35 s	31 in (0.79 m)	9 ft 3 in (2.82 m)	27 reps
All values from NFL Combine

His only workout that he did not finish in the top 10 was the bench press which is most likely due to his shoulder injury that he was having surgery on the week following the combine. He still posted an impressive 27 reps, only 3 away from a top 10 finish. Fulton was the top rated offensive tackle from the Big Ten Conference.

=== Tampa Bay Buccaneers ===
Fulton was the 19th pick in the fifth round of the 2009 NFL draft, picked by the Tampa Bay Buccaneers. He will be wearing the number 68 on his jersey, the same as his collegiate number. On Wednesday, June 10, 2009, Fulton signed a four-year contract with the Buccaneers. He was the first draft pick by Tampa to reach a contract agreement with the club.

Fulton played a majority of the four preseason games before tearing his anterior cruciate ligament in the final preseason game against the Houston Texans on September 4, 2009. Fulton was put on Injured Reserve for the season.

After being drafted, Fulton signed a four-year endorsement deal with Nike.

Fulton was cut from the team on September 4, 2010.

=== Indianapolis Colts ===
On September 6, 2010, Fulton was signed to the Indianapolis Colts practice squad. He was released on September 17.

=== San Francisco 49ers ===
Fulton was signed to the 49ers practice squad on November 10, 2010. He was released on November 30, 2010.

=== Washington Redskins ===
Fulton was signed on December 20, 2010. On January 3, 2010, Fulton signed a futures contract with the team for the 2011 season. He was waived on August 30, 2011.

=== 2011 lockout ===
During the NFL labor dispute, Fulton trained in boxing in addition to his football conditioning at the Academy of Human Performance.

=== Canadian Football League ===
On April 23, 2012, Fulton was traded to the Saskatchewan Roughriders of the Canadian Football League from the Edmonton Eskimos, in exchange for a 6th round pick in the 2013 CFL draft. The Roughriders won the 101st Grey Cup in November 2013. Fulton re-signed with the Roughriders in May 2016. Fulton was traded to the Hamilton Tiger Cats on Monday October 10, 2016. Fulton was traded from Hamilton to Montreal in 2017.

== Boxing & Golden Gloves Champion ==
Fulton began boxing as a way to train for the NFL, most notably in the off-season prior to reporting for the Redskins training camp. In February 2012 he signed up for the Golden Gloves in Chicago and became a Golden Gloves Champion on April 13, 2012. In Fulton's boxing career he has stayed undefeated at 3–0.

== Personal life ==
Fulton's younger brother, Zach Fulton, was an offensive lineman at the University of Tennessee. Zach Fulton, drafted to Kansas City Chiefs.

Fulton is said to have a voice between James Earl Jones and Dennis Haysbert and has done voice-over work in the past.
