= Ed Zabrocki =

American politician (born 1942)

Mayor of Tinley Park, Illinois
- In office May 1981 – June 2016
- Preceded by: John Dunn
- Succeeded by: Dave Seaman

Member of the Illinois House of Representatives from the 37th district
- In office January 1995 – August 1995
- Preceded by: John R. Sheehy
- Succeeded by: John Doody

Personal details
- Born: Edward J. Zabrocki; January 4, 1942 (age 84) Chicago, Illinois, U.S.
- Party: Republican
- Profession: Politician

Edward J. "Ed" Zabrocki (born January 4, 1942, in Chicago, Illinois) is a politician who served as the mayor of Tinley Park, Illinois, from May 1981 until his resignation in June 2016. During his mayoral tenure, he briefly served as a Republican member of the Illinois House of Representatives in 1995. After his resignation from the Illinois House of Representatives, local Republicans appointed John Doody, the Mayor of Homewood, Illinois, to replace him. While Mayor, Zabrocki also taught at Brother Rice High School in the City of Chicago from 1965 until 2005. At Brother Rice he taught English, including a stint as the English Department Chair, and was a guidance counselor. In 2016, Zabrocki resigned as Mayor for health and family reasons. In 2017, Zabrocki was appointed by Larry Walsh, Sr., the Will County Executive, to the Will County Board of Health.

== See also ==
- List of longest-serving United States mayors

Preceded by John Sheehy	Member of the Illinois House of Representatives from the 37th district January 1995 – August 1995	Succeeded by John Doody
