= John R. Sheehy =

American politician

John R. Sheehy (July 30, 1947) was a Democratic member of the Illinois House of Representatives for a single term from 1993 to 1995. He represented the 37th district, which was located in Chicago's south suburbs. Born in Chicago, Illinois. Sheehy attended Moraine Valley Community College and graduated from Worsham College of Mortuary Science. After graduating from Worsham, he went to work for his father at Sheehy Funeral Homes. He is an army veteran of the Vietnam War era. In 1992, Sheehy faced Carl James Vandenberg, who defeated fellow Republican and appointed incumbent Manny Hoffman of Homewood. Sheehy won the Republican leaning district by 239 votes. While a member of the Illinois House, he served on the following committees; Aging; Appropriations-Human Services; Elections & State Government; Elementary & Secondary Education; Registration & Regulation. He was defeated for reelection by Ed Zabrocki, the Mayor of Tinley Park, Illinois, by 539 votes.

Sheehy served in the United States Army.

Preceded by Manny Hoffman	Member of the Illinois House of Representatives from the 37th district January 1993 – January 1995	Succeeded by Ed Zabrocki
