= AT&T SportsNet Rocky Mountain =

Defunct regional sports network in the western United States

SportsNet Rocky Mountain
- Country: United States
- Broadcast area: Colorado; Nevada; Wyoming; Utah; Southern Idaho western Kansas western Nebraska western South Dakota parts of California; Mohave County, Arizona; Worldwide (via satellite)
- Headquarters: Denver, Colorado

Programming
- Language: English
- Picture format: 720p (HDTV); 480i (SDTV)

Ownership
- Owner: Bill Daniels (1988–1989); Home Sports Entertainment, Inc. (1988–1989); Tele-Communications Inc. (1988–1994); Liberty Media (1994–1999, 2006–2009); News Corporation (1996–2006); DirecTV Group (2009–2016); AT&T (2016–2017); Warner Bros. Discovery (2017–2023)
- Parent: DirecTV Sports Networks (2009–2016); AT&T Sports Networks (2016–2017); TNT Sports (2017–2023)

History
- Launched: November 15, 1988; 37 years ago
- Closed: December 31, 2023; 2 years ago
- Former names: Prime Sports Network (1988–1989); Prime Sports Network- Rocky Mountain (1989–1995); Prime Sports Rocky Mountain (1995–1996); Fox Sports Rocky Mountain (1996–1999); Fox Sports Net Rocky Mountain (1999–2004); FSN Rocky Mountain (2004–2011); Root Sports Rocky Mountain (2011–2017); AT&T SportsNet Rocky Mountain (2017–2023)

AT&T SportsNet Rocky Mountain was an American regional sports network owned by Warner Bros. Discovery through its TNT Sports unit as part of the AT&T SportsNet brand of networks. The network was in operation for 35 years from 1988 to 2023. Headquartered in Denver, Colorado, the network broadcast regional coverage of sports events throughout the Rocky Mountain region, mainly focusing on professional sports teams based in the Denver metropolitan area, Utah and Nevada.

SportsNet Rocky Mountain was available on cable providers throughout Colorado, Utah, Nevada, Wyoming, Montana, Central & Eastern Idaho, northern New Mexico, western Kansas, western Nebraska, western South Dakota, parts of California, including all of San Bernardino County and Mohave County, Arizona; it was also available nationwide on satellite via DirecTV.

== History ==
SportsNet Rocky Mountain was originally launched on November 15, 1988, as the Prime Sports Network, a joint venture between Bill Daniels, United Cable (controlled by TCI), and Home Sports Entertainment. The first live event ever shown on the network was a Denver Nuggets – Los Angeles Lakers NBA game. The network was originally broadcast from 5 p.m. to midnight weekdays and 11 a.m. to midnight on weekends. Additional programming included the Denver Zephyrs (minor-league baseball), college games from the Big Eight, the Western Athletic and the Missouri Valley conferences, and University of Denver hockey. Additionally, there was coverage of skiing, hunting, fishing, rodeo, boxing, tennis, and golf.

The network was one of the original members of the Prime Sports Network, a group of regional sports networks formed in 1989 as a partnership between Bill Daniels and TCI. It was officially renamed Prime Sports Network- Rocky Mountain to avoid confusion with the group which now had the same name. However, it still was often referred to on-air as "Prime Sport Network" or simply "PSN". In spring 1995, the network was renamed Prime Sports Rocky Mountain as part of a larger rebranding of Prime's RSNs, timed with the launch of direct broadcast satellite services such as DirecTV in the same year that required further disambiguation on a national lineup.

In October 1995, News Corporation, which formed a sports division for the Fox network two years earlier after it obtained the broadcast rights to the National Football Conference and sought to create a group of regional sports networks, acquired a 50% interest in the Prime Network from TCI parent Liberty Media. Later that year on November 1, News Corporation and Liberty Media relaunched the Prime Network affiliates as part of the new Fox Sports Net group, with the Denver-based network officially rebranding as Fox Sports Rocky Mountain. The channel was rebranded as Fox Sports Net Rocky Mountain in 2000, as part of a collective brand modification of the FSN networks under the "Fox Sports Net" banner; subsequently in 2004, the channel shortened its name to FSN Rocky Mountain, through the networks' de-emphasis of the "Fox Sports Net" brand.

On December 22, 2006, News Corporation sold its interest in FSN Rocky Mountain and sister networks FSN Utah, FSN Northwest and FSN Pittsburgh to Liberty Media, in an asset trade in which News Corporation also traded its 38.5% ownership stake in satellite provider DirecTV for $550 million in cash and stock, in exchange for Liberty Media's 16.3% stake in the company. On May 4, 2009, DirecTV Group Inc. announced it would become a part of Liberty's entertainment unit, part of which would then be spun off into the separate company under the DirecTV name, in a deal in which Liberty would increase its share in DirecTV from 48% to 54%, with Liberty owner John Malone and his family owning a 24% interest. DirecTV would operate its newly acquired FSN-affiliated networks through DirecTV Sports Networks, a new division formed when the split off from Liberty Media was completed on November 19, 2009.

On December 17, 2010, DirecTV Sports Networks announced that its four Fox Sports Networks-affiliated regional outlets – FSN Rocky Mountain, FSN Pittsburgh, FSN Northwest and FSN Utah – would be relaunched under the "Root Sports" brand. The network officially rebranded as Root Sports Rocky Mountain on April 1, 2011, with The Dan Patrick Show as the first program to air under the new brand. For nominal purposes, the Root Sports networks continued to carry programming distributed mainly to the Fox Sports regional networks to provide supplementary sports and entertainment programming.

On June 12, 2017, AT&T Sports Networks announced that the network, along with Root Sports Southwest, Root Sports Pittsburgh, and Root Sports Utah, will rebrand under the name AT&T SportsNet Rocky Mountain, with all network programming and on-air talent remaining intact. The name change took effect on July 14, 2017.

On October 1, 2021, AT&T SportsNet Rocky Mountain, along with sister networks AT&T SportsNet Pittsburgh, and Root Sports Northwest, was removed from Dish Network satellite and Sling streaming TV services.

On February 24, 2023, Warner Bros. Discovery announced that it would leave the RSN business. Originally scheduled for a winddown by March 31, WBD and Major League Baseball would later agree to sustain RSN operations through the end of the MLB season. In August, John Ourand of the Sports Business Journal reported that AT&T SportsNet Rocky Mountain was likely to be shuttered, and that the Rockies were considering a deal with Altitude Sports and Entertainment or assigning their local television rights to MLB. The Rockies eventually decided in 2024 to air their games locally with assistance from MLB. It was later confirmed that the network will shut down by the end of 2023, with full-time employees laid off on October 6. The network was subsequently rebranded as SportsNet Rocky Mountain for its last few weeks of service, removing AT&T's name from the product entirely. The channel's final two months on the air comprised broadcasts of some national and syndicated sports programs, including some SSN Sports shows, Sports Stars of Tomorrow and the World Poker Tour among others.

== Former programming ==
=== Professional sports ===
- Denver Nuggets (NBA) (1988–2004)
- Utah Jazz (NBA) (1989–2023)
- Colorado Avalanche (NHL) (1995–2004)
- Colorado Rockies (MLB) (1997–2023)
- Colorado Crush (AFL) (2005–2008)
- Western Hockey League (2009–2015)
- Vegas Golden Knights (NHL) (2017–2023)
- Las Vegas Aces (WNBA) (2018–2023)
- Utah Warriors (MLR) (2018–2023)
- Colorado Raptors (MLR) (2018–2020)

The network's coverage for Rockies telecasts, as well as both NBA and NHL teams, included pregame and postgame shows, game replays, classic game re-airs, and additional insider programming. For the Rockies and Golden Knights, the network produced a weekly in-season magazine program for each team (The Club: Colorado Rockies and Knight Life, respectively), whereas insider programming for the Jazz was more sporadic, consisting of occasional special features such as the 2018 Hot Rod Hundley documentary.

The channel lost the broadcast rights to the Nuggets and Avalanche in 2004 when the owner of both teams, Stan Kroenke, launched the competing regional sports network Altitude Sports and Entertainment. On March 4, 2023, following the announcement that Warner Bros. Discovery would exit the RSN business, the Knights signed an exclusive multi-year over-the-air agreement with the E.W. Scripps Company's KMCC-TV and KTNV beginning with the 2023–24 season, ending the team's broadcasts on AT&T SportsNet Rocky Mountain after six seasons. The Utah Jazz announced on June 20, 2023 that they too would be leaving the network in favor of moving their games back to KJZZ-TV, as well as some games and services also being aired on KUTV and utilizing their own streaming service created by Kiswe called "Jazz+". A simulcast of these games air on former sister network Root Sports Northwest in Montana, Idaho, and parts of Oregon and Washington. The Las Vegas Aces are now aired on KVVU, and Rockies telecasts moved to a platform operated by MLB.tv for the 2024 season.

=== College and high school sports ===
- Denver Pioneers hockey and men's and women's basketball (now on Altitude Sports and Entertainment)
- Colorado College Tigers hockey (now on KXTU-LD)
- New Mexico State Aggies football and basketball (now on ESPN+)
- Colorado Buffaloes sporting events and insider programming (now on ESPN+)
- Big Sky Conference football (now on Scripps TV affiliates)
- Mountain West Conference football and men's basketball
- Colorado High School Activities Association football (now on Altitude Sports and Entertainment)
- Syndicated coverage of Big 12, Pac-12, WCC, SEC, ACC, Big East, and Conference USA athletics

== Regional subfeeds ==
=== West subfeed ===
On May 23, 2017, it was announced that the network had acquired the regional cable rights to the new Vegas Golden Knights NHL expansion team. These telecasts are available in all of Nevada, and parts of Arizona, and California, including all of San Bernardino County, as well as Utah, Wyoming, and Idaho. The games are also made available on sister network Root Sports Northwest in northern Idaho and Montana.

In June 2018, AT&T SportsNet acquired rights to the newly relocated Las Vegas Aces of the WNBA.

=== Utah subfeed ===
In late 1989, TCI launched Prime Sports Network-Utah as a replacement from their game-only Jazz Cable Network. Although it originally was considered a separate network, at some point it began to operate as a subfeed with almost identical programming. The main feature of this Utah-based network had always been Utah Jazz basketball games. Over the years it was known as Prime Sports Intermountain West, Fox Sports Utah and finally Root Sports Utah. When AT&T took over the network all Utah branding was dropped and it now operates as a true subfeed. Jazz games produced by AT&T SportsNet Rocky Mountain were also available in Idaho and Montana on sister network Root Sports Northwest.

== Former on-air staff ==
=== Announcer parings and hosts ===
Colorado Rockies

- Kelsey Wingert – Rockies pre-game and post-game host, on field reporter
- Jenny Cavnar – Rockies pre-game and post-game host, fill in play by play, on field reporter
- Drew Goodman – Rockies play-by-play and college basketball and football play-by-play
- Jeff Huson – Rockies color analyst, pre-game and post-game analyst
- George Frazier ^{D} – Rockies color analyst
- Alanna Rizzo - Rockies postgame anchor and sideline reporter
- Marc Stout – Rockies pre-game and post-game host, on field reporter
- Ryan Spilborghs – Rockies color analyst, pre-game and post-game analyst, on field reporter
- Cory Sullivan – Rockies pre-game and post-game analyst
- Jack Corrigan – Rockies fill in play by play

Colorado Avalanche

- John Kelly – Avalanche play-by-play
- Peter McNab ^{D} – Avalanche analyst

Denver Nuggets

- Drew Goodman – Nuggets play-by-play
- Scott Hastings – Nuggets color analyst
- Sandy Williams – Nuggets courtside reporter

Las Vegas Aces

- Anne Marie Anderson – Aces play-by-play
- Rushia Brown – Aces color commentary
- Amanda Pflugrad – Aces sideline reporter
- Katy Winge – Aces sideline reporter

Utah Jazz

- Thurl Bailey – Utah Jazz color commentary
- Craig Bolerjack – Utah Jazz play-by-play
- Hot Rod Hundley ^{D} – Utah Jazz play-by-play
- Alema Harrington – Jazz Live studio host
- Holly Rowe – Utah Jazz color commentary
- Michael Smith – Jazz Live studio analyst

Vegas Golden Knights

- Darren Eliot – Golden Knights studio analyst
- Dave Goucher – Golden Knights play-by-play
- Shane Hnidy – Golden Knights analyst
- Stormy Buonantony – Golden Knights reporter
- Mike McKenna – Golden Knights studio analyst
- Daren Millard – Golden Knights studio host

College sports

- Ceal Barry – college basketball analyst
- Sherdrick Bonner – college football analyst
- Drew Goodman – college basketball and football play-by-play announcer
- Charlie Host – college hockey analyst
- Mark Johnson – college football analyst
- Jay Leeuwenburg – college football analyst
- Taylor McGregor – college football sideline reporter
- Tim Neverett – college sports play-by-play, fill-in Rockies play-by-play announcer, and Rockies postgame anchor
- Brad Thompson – college football sideline reporter
- Darius Walker – college football analyst
- Ari Wolfe – college football play-by-play announcer

Hosts and reporters

- Keith Bleyer – Rocky Mountain Sports Report reporter
- Darian Boyle – Rocky Mountain Sports Report reporter and Rockies Weekly host
- Chuck Garfien – Rocky Mountain Sports Report anchor and reporter
- Chick Hernandez – Rocky Mountain Sports Report anchor
- Barry LeBrock – Rocky Mountain Sports Report anchor
- Tim Ring – Rocky Mountain Sports Report anchor
- Marc Soicher – Rocky Mountain Sports Report anchor
- Charissa Thompson – Rockies Weekly host and college football and basketball reporter

^{D} Denotes person is deceased.
