= Sophia Danenberg =

American mountain climber

- Born: Sophia Marie Scott; 1972 (age 53–54); Okinawa, Japan
- Other name: Sophia Marie Scott
- Education: Harvard University: Environmental Sciences and Public Policy
- Employer: The Boeing Company
- Political party: Democratic Party

Sophia Danenberg (born 1972) is an American mountaineer best known as the first African American and first black woman to climb Mount Everest, the world's tallest mountain. Danenberg is active in local and national politics and serves as a Washington State Park Commissioner. She is biracial, with her mother Japanese and her father black.

== Early life ==
Danenberg was born in 1972 in Okinawa, Japan, to the name Sophia Marie Scott. Her father was stationed in Japan as a member of the United States Army. At age 1, her family moved to the United States. As a toddler, her family moved back to Japan. Danenberg once again moved to the suburbs of Chicago, Homewood, at age 6. She graduated Homewood-Flossmoor High School in 1990 after participating on the school's track team.

Initially, Danenberg studied Applied Math and Chemistry at Harvard University. After traveling to Thailand, Danenberg switched to an undergraduate degree in Environmental Sciences and Public Policy when she saw the possibilities of the juxtaposition of the natural environment and economy. She graduated magna cum laude and was one of the first five students to graduate from this program. Upon graduation, Danenberg was a Fulbright Fellow at Keio University in Tokyo, where she first began to rock climb.

== Career ==
Danenberg started her career at United Technologies Research Center, managing energy and indoor air quality projects. In 2003, Danenberg became a Senior Engineer for the Green Engine Program at Pratt & Whitney. In 2005, she joined the EHS division. In this position, she discovered the company was unknowingly using flame retardant banned by the European Union. The discovery lead to a change in how industry handles dangerous chemical bans.

As of 2009, Danenberg was recruited to Boeing to develop their international, environmental, health, and safety (EHS) policy analysis program. Additionally, her role includes coordinating advocacy input for EHS outside of the United States.

== Political Involvement ==
Danenberg contributed to the campaign effort for Barack Obama’s 2008 Presidential Election. In 2008 she served as a delegate to the Democratic National Convention. Danenberg was also a presidential elector for the Biden-Harris ticket in the 2020 election. On September 17th, 2019, she was appointed to fill the Washington State Park Commissioner post by Governor Jay Inslee. She filled in the vacant seat left by retiree Pat Lantz. Danenberg currently holds this position; her term expires presently on December 31st, 2026. In 2021, she was appointed to the King County Districting Committee.

Danenberg also serves on the board of NatureBridge, SheJumps, National Institute of Reproductive Health, and the legislative and public affairs committee of the Society of Professional Engineering Employees in Aerospace (SPEEA).

== Accomplishments ==
=== Mount Everest ===
Originally planning on summitting Cho Oyu in 2006, she called IMG (International Mountain Guides) in Bellingham in January to talk to them about their Cho Oyu climb in October. After hearing about her experience, they suggested she join an Everest expedition that departed in March. Sophia Danenberg began the climb of Mount Everest with Pa Nuru Sherpa, on a supported unguided climb where she took on her own planning, choosing her own schedule and making her own decisions at age 34. At 7 A.M. on May 19, 2006, Danenberg reached the top of Mount Everest. Withstanding bad weather during the night that delayed some other climbers in her party, Pa Nuru Sherpa and his brother Mingma Tshiring were the only climbers to witness the event. At the time, Danenberg was suffering from bronchitis, a stuffed nose, frostbite on her cheeks and a clogged oxygen mask. Danenberg was the first African American and the first black woman to reach the summit.

Summits
Everest
Aconcagua
Denali
Kilimanjaro
Tasman
Baker
Grand Teton
Ama Dablam
Rainier
