= Kevin A. McCarthy =

American politician (born 1950)

Member of the Illinois House of Representatives from the 37th district
- In office January 1997 - December 2011
- Preceded by: John Doody
- Succeeded by: Charles W. Krezwick

Personal details
- Born: December 5, 1950 (age 75) Chicago, Illinois
- Party: Democratic
- Spouse: Judy
- Profession: Educator

Kevin A. McCarthy (born 1950) is a former Democratic member of the Illinois House of Representatives, representing the 37th District from 1997 to 2011. The district included all of Orland Hills, portions of Orland Park, Tinley Park, Oak Forest and unincorporated Frankfort Square.

In the 1996 general election, McCarthy, of Orland Park, defeated Republican incumbent John Doody to represent the 37th district. He resigned effective December 27, 2011. The Democratic Representative Committee of the 37th Representative District appointed Charles W. Krezwick to the vacancy.
