= Kris Cooke =

American football player (born 1988)

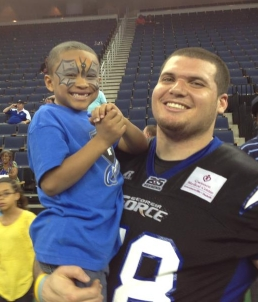
- Cooke (#58) with a fan after a game

No. 58, 99
- Position: Nose tackle

Personal information
- Born: January 19, 1988 (age 38); Blue Island, Illinois, U.S.
- Listed height: 6 ft 3 in (1.91 m)
- Listed weight: 295 lb (134 kg)

Career information
- High school: Homewood (IL)-Flossmoor
- College: Purdue
- NFL draft: 2010: undrafted

Career history
- Georgia Force (2012); Cleveland Gladiators (2013)

Career AFL statistics
- Tackles: 21
- Sacks: 8.5
- Forced fumbles: 1
- Fumble recoveries: 1
- Blocked FGs: 1
- Stats at ArenaFan.com

Kristofer Cooke (born January 19, 1988) is an American former football defensive tackle who played in the Arena Football League (AFL).

== High school ==
Cooke played defensive tackle, offensive tackle, linebacker and fullback at Homewood-Flossmoor High School. He was named all-area as senior after recording 80 tackles, including 13 sacks, with five pass breakups and three fumble recoveries. He recorded 62 tackles, including seven sacks, during his junior year en route to earning all-conference honors. Cooke moved up to varsity in his sophomore year to play for coach Tom Bailey. As a sophomore, he racked up 35 tackles, including five sacks. Cooke was team captain in his junior and senior seasons. He also participated in weight-lifting competitions and track and field.

College recruiting
Name	Hometown	School	Height	Weight	40^{‡}	Commit date
Kris Cooke; DT	Homewood, Illinois	Homewood-Flossmoor High School	6 ft 1 in (1.85 m)	302 lb (137 kg)	5.0	Sep 28, 2005
Kris Cooke; DT	Recruit ratings: Scout: Rivals: (67)					
Overall recruit ranking: Scout: NR (DT) Rivals: NR (DT), NR (IL) ESPN: 76 (DT) 148 (Region)
Note: In many cases, Scout, Rivals, 247Sports, On3, and ESPN may conflict in their listings of height and weight.; In these cases, the average was taken. ESPN grades are on a 100-point scale.; Sources: "Northern Illinois Football Commitment List". Rivals.; "Northern Illinois College Football Recruiting Commits". Scout.; "ESPN". ESPN.; "Scout.com Team Recruiting Rankings". Scout.; "2006 Team Ranking". Rivals.com.

== College ==
Cooke appeared in one game in 2006 for Northern Illinois versus Ohio on September 9 and recorded one tackle. After one season at Northern Illinois, Cooke transferred to Joliet Junior College, where he was a second team All-American and first team all-conference, and conference defensive MVP in 2007 after recording 30 tackles, including four sacks, with two pass breakups and one forced fumble.

College recruiting
Name	Hometown	School	Height	Weight	40^{‡}	Commit date
Kris Cooke; DT	Homewood, Illinois	Joliet Junior College	6 ft 3 in (1.91 m)	315 lb (143 kg)	--	Unknown
Kris Cooke; DT	Recruit ratings: Scout: Rivals: (NR)					
Overall recruit ranking: Scout: JC (DT) Rivals: NR (DT), NR (IL) ESPN: NR (DT)
Note: In many cases, Scout, Rivals, 247Sports, On3, and ESPN may conflict in their listings of height and weight.; In these cases, the average was taken. ESPN grades are on a 100-point scale.; Sources: "Purdue Football Commitment List". Rivals.; "Purdue Illinois College Football Recruiting Commits". Scout.; "ESPN". ESPN.; "Scout.com Team Recruiting Rankings". Scout.; "2008 Team Ranking". Rivals.com.

Cooke appeared in eight games as reserve and on special teams during 2008 season for Purdue Boilermakers during Joe Tiller's final year as Purdue head coach. Cooke recorded seven tackles (2 solo, 5 assists) including season-high three tackles at Northwestern on October 18 (1 solo, 2 assists) and at Michigan State on November 8 (all assists).

== Professional career ==
=== Georgia Force ===
Debuted for the Georgia Force, of the Arena Football League, during 2012 season as starting nose tackle. Cooke attended an open tryout for the Force in August 2011 and drew the attention of head coach Dean Cokinos. He was invited to the February 2012 training camp on a 2-day waiver. Cooke proved himself to the Force coaching staff and signed with the team. He earned a starting position at nose tackle by week six of the 2012 season and helped the team achieve a victory against the previously unbeaten, Chicago Rush, one week after the Force's devastating and record-breaking 92-42 loss to the Philadelphia Soul.

=== Cleveland Gladiators ===
Cooke signed with the Cleveland Gladiators, of the Arena Football League for the 2013 season. Cooke was placed on retirement on January 21, 2014.
