= Astead Herndon =

American journalist

- Born: March 31, 1993 (age 33); Chicago, Illinois, United States
- Education: Marquette University (BA)
- Occupation: Journalist
- Known for: National politics reporter for The New York Times; Political analyst and contributor for CNN

Astead Wesley Herndon (born March 31, 1993) is an American journalist. Since October 2025, he hosts a podcast and directs political coverage at Vox. He was previously a reporter for The New York Times, where he covered politics and hosted the podcast The Run-Up. He has also contributed to CNN and reported for the Milwaukee Journal Sentinel and The Boston Globe.

== Early life and education ==
Herndon was born on March 31, 1993, in Chicago, Illinois, and raised in the suburb of Flossmoor. His father established a branch of the Church of God in Christ. He graduated from Homewood-Flossmoor High School in 2010. He later graduated from Marquette University with a degree in journalism. While there, he became involved with the National Association of Black Journalists (NABJ). He worked with AmeriCorps during a gap year while at Marquette.

== Career ==
Herndon worked as a journalist with the Milwaukee Journal Sentinel and later in Washington D.C. as part of the White House press corps. After interning at The Boston Globe, Herndon became a reporter there in 2015, where he worked as part of their Metro and City Hall sections. Among his pieces while at the Globe included uncovering real estate fraud in the Boston area, as well as turning down a $5,000 bribe and uncovering the source of the bribe in a two-part story.

He joined The New York Times in 2018. He has extensively covered national elections with the newspaper, starting with the 2018 midterm elections. In 2019, he was the newspaper's reporter for Kamala Harris' 2020 presidential campaign. His coverage of the 2020 presidential election was included as part of The New York Times nomination for the Pulitzer Prize in 2021. His 2024 profile of Kamala Harris was nominated for a National Magazine Award.

Herndon hosted The Run-Up, a podcast created in 2022 and dedicated to election coverage and politics more broadly. It was named one of the best podcasts of 2022 by The Economist. The podcast was also nominated for the Toner Prize for Excellence in Political Reporting and a Livingston Award.

In 2021, he was named a member of Forbes 30 Under 30 in the Media category. In 2023, he was named a Pritzker fellow at the University of Chicago Institute of Politics for their Winter-Spring 2023 cohort. Herndon was awarded with the Distinguished Journalist Award by DePaul University's Center for Journalism Integrity & Excellence in 2025.

In October 2025, Herndon left the Times to host a podcast for Vox and serve as editorial director of its political coverage.

Herndon also works as a political analyst and contributor for CNN.
