= WHFH =

Radio station at Homewood-Flossmoor High School in Flossmoor, Illinois

Coordinates: 41.545°N 87.692°W

- Flossmoor, Illinois; United States
- Broadcast area: South Chicago Suburbs
- Frequency: 88.5 MHz

Programming
- Format: High school radio

Ownership
- Owner: Homewood-Flossmoor High School; (Community High School District #233)

History
- First air date: December 21, 1964
- Call sign meaning: Homewood-Flossmoor High

Technical information
- Licensing authority: FCC
- Facility ID: 12922
- Class: A
- ERP: 1,500 watts
- HAAT: 33 meters (108 ft)

Links
- Public license information: Public file; LMS

WHFH 88.5 FM is an American FM non-profit non-commercial educational high school radio station licensed by the Federal Communications Commission to serve the community of and areas surrounding Flossmoor, Illinois. (approx. 2.4 million people) The station is owned and operated by Homewood-Flossmoor High School.

Flossmoor is located about 20 miles (32 km) south of Chicago. The station operates 24/7, switching to virtual management during the COVID-19 pandemic and allowing for the station to run beyond the former cutoff time of 6 pm on Friday. WHFH covers all home Varsity football games. There is also extra programming (i.e. school sports games and local events). The program also has a remote capability, allowing students to go live on the air anywhere in the world.

Former WHFH hosts have gone on to hold careers in TV and radio both locally and nationally, such as Jason Benetti, Chuck Garfien, Laurence Holmes and Randy Merkin.

== History ==
Starting as 'The Radio Club' in 1962, Homewood-Flossmoor High School was originally granted a license to operate at 10 watts on the 88.5 FM frequency on December 21, 1964. The first broadcast was on January 7, 1965. During the summer of 1972 Jerry Garber directed new freshman student Robert Owens to install and wire the studio on campus. Over the years the program grew. In the 1970s the station boosted its power to 1,500 watts (where it remains to this day). A new studio was built in 1992 in order to accommodate the school's growing television program. Another complete renovation was conducted in 2013 in order to create a more technologically advanced studio for both Viking Television and WHFH Radio.

== Student curriculum ==
WHFH is run mainly by the student body of Homewood-Flossmoor High School with faculty oversight. The station's license is vested in the Board of Education. The station's General Manager was Robert Comstock, an alumnus, who has been acting in various roles with the program since the 1960s. He retired in 2012 and the position was assumed by Mark Ciesielski, the Viking Television and WHFH teacher and director.

WHFH has both curricular and volunteer positions. During a student's second year in the curriculum he or she must produce, edit and direct a radio documentary (formerly 55 minutes long, now 11 minutes due to time constraints) that is broadcast live over the radio. Only by successfully completing this assignment is a student given a management position during their third and fourth years in the program.
