= Flossmoor School District 161 =

School district in Illinois, United States

Address
- 41 East Elmwood Drive Chicago Heights, Illinois, 60411; United States

District information
- Type: Public
- Grades: PreK–8
- NCES District ID: 1715420

Students and staff
- Students: 2,301

Other information
- Website: www.sd161.org

Flossmoor School District 161 is a school district headquartered in Chicago Heights, Illinois, in the Chicago metropolitan area. It serves Chicago Heights and Flossmoor.

Homewood-Flossmoor High School is separate, controlled by its own school district.

== Schools ==
Junior high:

- Parker Junior High School

Elementary:

- Flossmoor Hills Elementary School
- Heather Hill Elementary School
- Serena Hills Elementary School
- Western Avenue Elementary School
