= Philip Hart Cullom =

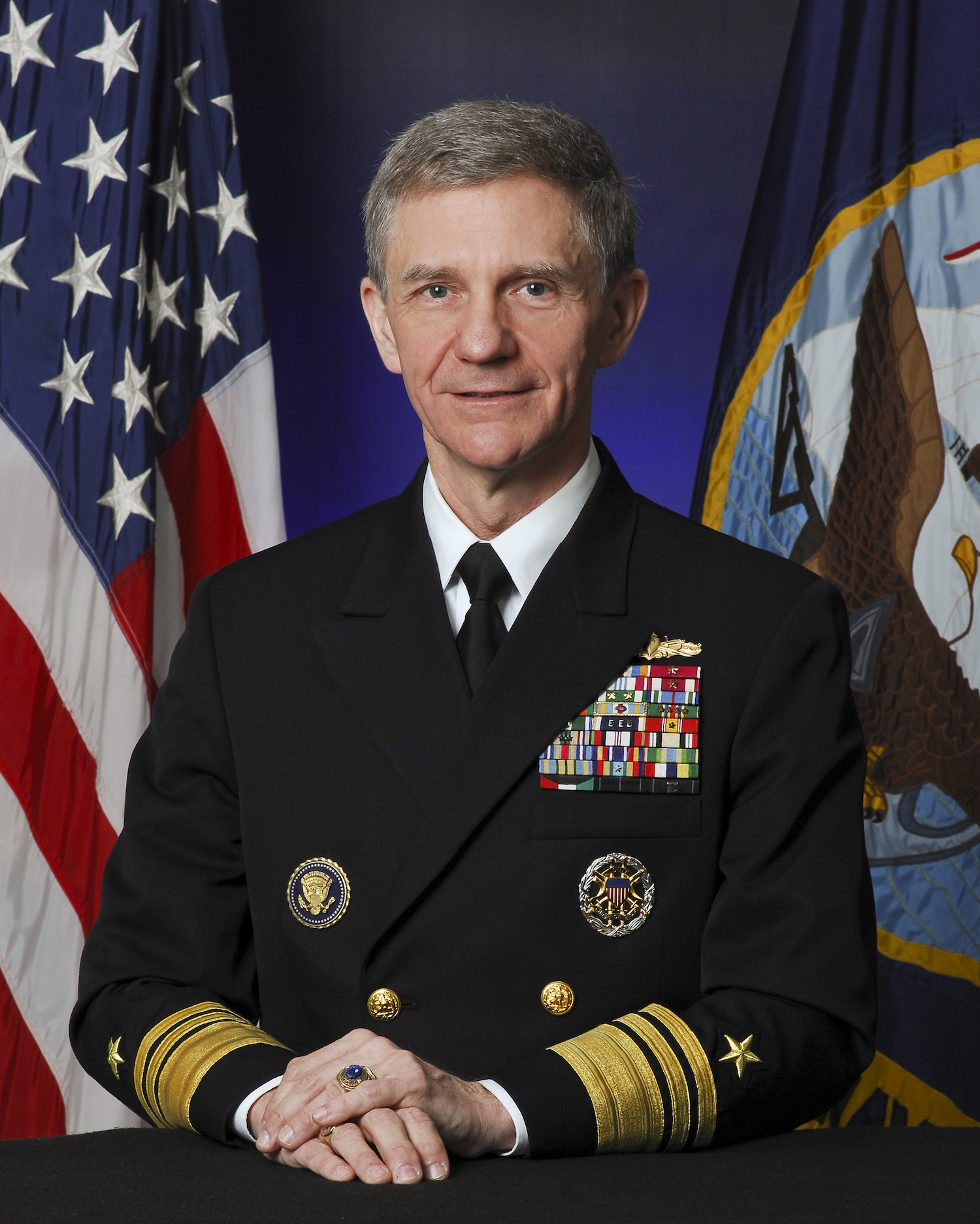
Philip Hart Cullom

Philip Hart Cullom (born July 17, 1957) is a retired vice admiral in the United States Navy.

== Biography ==
Cullom is a native of Flossmoor, Illinois. He earned an MBA from Harvard Business School in 1988.

== Career ==
Cullom graduated from the United States Naval Academy in 1979. His assignments at sea have included serving aboard the USS Mobile Bay, the USS Dwight D. Eisenhower, the USS Jesse L. Brown, the USS Truxtun (CGN-35) and as commanding officer of the USS Mitscher (DDG-57). Ashore, Cullom's assignments include serving with the Office of Management and Budget, the Chief of Naval Operations, the Joint Chiefs of Staff, the United States National Security Council and the Idaho National Laboratory.

Awards he has received include the Navy Distinguished Service Medal, the Defense Superior Service Medal, the Legion of Merit, the Superior Honor Award and the French National Order of Merit (Officer).

In November 2015, President Barack Obama nominated Cullom to serve as Assistant Secretary of Defense for Energy, Installations, and Environment. This nomination was withdrawn in January 2016. Cullom retired from active duty in 2017.
