= Chuck Garfien =

American sports reporter

Chuck Garfien is an anchor/reporter for Chicago Sports Network. He is the host of pre-game and post-game White Sox shows with Ozzie Guillén, Frank Thomas, and other former White Sox players. Since joining the network's predecessor, NBC Sports Chicago, in 2004, Garfien has won several Chicago/Midwest Emmy awards for feature stories on Chicago sports. His work at the network began with hosting pre-game and post-game Chicago Bulls shows.

Garfien also hosts the White Sox Podcast, featuring interviews, news and discussions regarding the club. At NBC Sports Chicago, Garfien hosted The White Sox Talk Podcast which surpassed 7 million downloads in 2024. The podcast was a finalist for Best Baseball Podcast and Best Team Podcast by the Sports Podcast Awards in December of 2023. .

Previously, Garfien was an anchor/reporter for Fox Sports Net in Denver. He worked for two years at ESPN and was one of the original anchors on ESPNEWS. He was the sports director for two years at WWJ-TV/WKBD-TV, the CBS and UPN affiliates in Detroit, and was a sports anchor/reporter for WABC-TV in New York City. Garfien was also a sports anchor/reporter at WHTM-TV in Harrisburg, Pennsylvania. His first on-air sportscasting work was at WPBN-TV in Traverse City, Michigan.

Garfien graduated from the University of Southern California with a degree in communications. He attended Homewood-Flossmoor High School in Flossmoor, Illinois. Garfien's broadcasting career began with four years working at his high school's radio station, WHFH. He was the station manager during his senior year.
