= Gitte Haslebo =

Danish psychologist

Gitte Haslebo (born 4 December 1943, in Copenhagen) is a Danish scientist, author, and organisational psychologist who works as a consultant and offers training courses within a social constructionist framework. She is an associate with the Taos Institute.

== Background ==
Haslebo was born in Copenhagen, Denmark, in 1943, the daughter of Harald and Else Haslebo. She was raised in Vanloese and Skovlunde, where her father founded his construction company, Skovlunde Byggeforretning. She attended Skovlunde Skole until she was 12 years old, when she switched to Lindevangskolen in Ballerup, Copenhagen. In 1960–61 Haslebo spent a year in the United States, graduating in 1961 from Homewood-Flossmoor High School in suburban Chicago. After her return to Denmark, she graduated from high school in 1963.

Haslebo completed a master's degree in business administration in 1968 at the University of Kansas and took a degree as a psychologist from the University of Copenhagen in 1970. She also has a Scandinavian process consultant degree from the European Institute for Transnational Training.

== Career ==
Haslebo started out as an amanuensis at the University of Copenhagen, where she worked from 1970 to 1972. She then began her career as a scientist at the newly established Sydjysk Universitetscenter. She then worked at the Low Income Commission until 1983. After about a year as an official at the Danish Ministry of Environment, she was made head of education for the Danish School of Public Administration, where she was employed until 1989. The following two years she worked for Kommunedata as head of human resources. In 1991 Haslebo founded her own company and now works as an organizational consultant.

== Publications ==
=== Books ===
- Practicing Relational Ethics in Organizations, TAOS Institute Publications, 2012.
- Nye veje for journalistik – Når sprog skaber virkeligheder, Dansk Psykologisk Forlag, 2010, ISBN 978-87-7706-673-3.
- Etik i organisationer – fra gode hensigter til bedre handlemuligheder, Dansk Psykologisk Forlag, 2007, ISBN 978-87-77-06455-5.
- Relationer i organisationer – en verden til forskel, Dansk Psykologisk Forlag, 2007, ISBN 978-87-77-06351-0.
- Erhvervspsykologi i praksis – metoder til fælles bevægelse, Dansk Psykologisk Forlag, 1998, ISBN 978-87-77-06874-4.
- Konsultation i organisationer – hvordan mennesker skaber ny mening, Dansk Psykologisk Forlag, 1997, ISBN 978-87-77-06344-2.

=== Articles ===
- Etik i særklasse, I: Offentlig ledelse, særtryk, nr. 4., 2010
- Anerkendende og relationel ledelsesudvikling, I: Ledelse i udvikling, sept., s. 46–48.
- Fra lederudvikling til ledelsesudvikling, I: Tidsskrift om personaleledelse, nr. 4, s. 10–14.
- Lederen som coach – forskellige vinkler på magt og etik, I: Erhvervspsykologi, vol. 5, nr. 2, s.22 – 43.
- Positionsskift og erkendelse i organisationer, Erhvervspsykologi, vol. 1, nr. 1, s. 54–67.
