= Jason Benetti =

American sportscaster (born 1983)

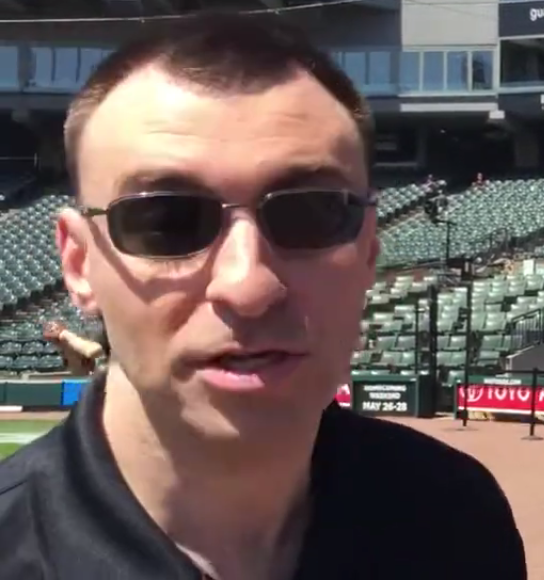
- Benetti in 2017
- Born: Jason Robert Benetti; September 9, 1983 (age 43); Chicago, Illinois, U.S.
- Education: Syracuse University; Wake Forest University
- Sports commentary career
- Teams: Chicago White Sox (2016–2023); Detroit Tigers (2024–present)
- Genre: Play-by-play
- Sports: College basketball; College football; Major League Baseball; National Basketball Association; National Football League
- Employer: ESPN (2011–2022); NBC Sports Chicago (2016–2023); NBC Sports (2021–2022, 2026–present); Fox Sports (2022–2026); Detroit Tigers (2024–present)

Jason Robert Benetti (born September 9, 1983) is an American sportscaster. He is the primary television play-by-play announcer for the Detroit Tigers of Major League Baseball on Detroit SportsNet, as well as the lead play-by-play announcer for Sunday Night Baseball on NBC and Peacock and secondary play-by-play announcer for NBA on NBC and College Football on NBC Sports (including Notre Dame Football).

From 2016 to 2023, Benetti was the lead play-by-play announcer for Chicago White Sox of MLB, and served as an alternate play-by-play announcer for Chicago Bulls of the National Basketball Association, on NBC Sports Chicago. Now primarily contracted with NBC Sports nationally, Benetti was formerly the main announcer for ESPN's alternate "StatCast" telecasts, and additionally has worked for Fox Sports, Westwood One, and Time Warner covering football, baseball, lacrosse, hockey, and basketball.

== Early life and education ==
Benetti was born ten weeks prematurely at the University of Chicago Hospital, where he remained for the first three months of his life. While in intensive care, Benetti developed a respiratory illness that deprived his blood of oxygen. He was later diagnosed with cerebral palsy as a toddler. Benetti underwent years of physical therapy and two surgeries to improve his ability to walk.

Benetti grew up a few miles south of Chicago in Homewood, Illinois, and graduated from Homewood-Flossmoor High School in 2001. He ran the school's NCAA tournament pool and joined the school's radio station, WHFH (88.5) as a regular disc jockey and play-by-play announcer for Vikings sports coverage. Benetti's cerebral palsy prevented him from playing tuba during marching band season. Not wanting to exclude him, the band director asked him to serve as the halftime broadcaster for their marching events.

Benetti attended S. I. Newhouse School of Public Communications at Syracuse University and graduated in 2005 with bachelor's degrees in broadcast journalism, economics and psychology. At Syracuse, he worked at WAER-FM and WJPZ FM where he called Syracuse Orange lacrosse and women's basketball.

After graduating from Syracuse, Benetti enrolled at Wake Forest University School of Law, where he earned a Juris Doctor degree in 2011.

== Career ==
During law school, Benetti acted as the voice of High Point Panthers basketball games, Syracuse Chiefs baseball games, and high school sports for Time Warner Cable Sports Channel. He also worked in roles with Fox Sports 1, Westwood One, Big East Conference, IMG College, Salem Avalanche, and DePaul University.

=== ESPN (2011–2022) ===
Benetti served as an intern for Chicago sports radio station WSCR. In 2011 Benetti joined ESPN, where his broadcasting career would move him into television, despite his childhood preference for radio-only broadcasting. Benetti would call select college basketball games for the ESPN3 online service, and then move on to ESPN2 and ESPNU. In 2013 Benetti called his first football game for ESPN's syndicated American Athletic Conference package.

In 2020, Benetti signed a multi-year extension with ESPN, and during that year called KBO League games remotely for the network due to the COVID-19-induced delay of the 2020 Major League Baseball season.

=== Chicago White Sox (2016–2023) ===
Beginning with the 2016 season, Benetti replaced recently retired Hall of fame broadcaster Ken Harrelson as the television play-by-play announcer for select Chicago White Sox home and road games, where he would be paired with Steve Stone. In May 2017, the White Sox announced Benetti would take over full-time play-by-play duties in 2019 upon Harrelson's retirement. NBC Sports described Benetti and Stone as being among the league's top broadcasting duos.

After the 2023 season, Benetti left the White Sox. Chicago Sun-Times columnist Jeff Agrest reported that multiple sources said a remark by chief revenue and marketing officer Brooks Boyer contributed to tensions involving Benetti and the team's front office. In addition, Benetti speculated that the White Sox preferred a more traditional broadcasting voice rather than his looser, playful style.

In the first year after Benetti's departure, the White Sox booth plummeted from 6th to 30th in booth rankings conducted by Awful Announcing.

=== Detroit Tigers (2024–present) ===
In November 2023, Benetti was named as the principal play-by-play announcer for Detroit Tigers telecasts on Bally Sports Detroit beginning in the 2024 season. Benetti said one of his motivations for joining the Tigers was "finding the people who really want you for you," in contrast to his previous employer, the Chicago White Sox. Though he appeared on Bally telecasts, Benetti was directly employed by the Tigers. In Benetti's first season with the Tigers, the broadcast booth jumped from being ranked 30th the year prior to being ranked 10th in 2024 in the annual ranking conducted by Awful Announcing.

Benetti also co-hosted the interview-style podcast Have a Seat with Tigers radio announcer Dan Dickerson.

=== Fox Sports (2022–2026) ===
In August 2022, Benetti moved to Fox Sports and did play by play for Fox's coverage of college football and basketball, as well as Major League Baseball. Even after the move, he continued calling games for NBC Sports Chicago.

In Week 17 and 18 of the 2022 NFL season, Benetti worked his first games for the NFL on Fox, doing play-by-play as the Arizona Cardinals visited the Atlanta Falcons to start, followed by the Carolina Panthers against the New Orleans Saints in week 18 and filled-in for Brandon Gaudin, who filled-in for Wayne Larrivee on the Green Bay Packers radio network.

=== NBC Sports (2021–2022, 2026–present) ===
In 2021, Benetti was named as play-by-play announcer for NBC's coverage of baseball at the 2020 Summer Olympics.

On April 26, 2022, it was reported that Benetti would serve as the lead play-by-play announcer for the new NBC Sports-produced MLB Sunday Leadoff games for Peacock, joined by rotating analysts representing the teams in each game.

On March 4, 2026, it was confirmed that Benetti would return to NBC Sports and serve as lead play-by-play for Sunday Night Baseball games for NBC and Peacock.

On April 21, 2026, Benetti announced coverage for NBA on NBC during the 2026 playoffs along with Robbie Hummel and Jordan Cornette. In August 2026 it was confirmed that he would be part of the network's upcoming NBA and college football coverage. On November 12, 2026, it was confirmed that Benetti would replace the late Dan Hicks for the coverage of Notre Dame Fighting Irish football.

=== 2026 NCAA March Madness - CBS/TNT ===
On March 19, 2026, Benetti, with permission from NBC, called the first day of first-round games of the 2026 NCAA men's basketball tournament in Buffalo, New York for CBS and TNT. Benetti filled in for Brian Anderson, who had voice issues in a prior broadcast.

== Personal life ==
Benetti works with the CHAT ("Communication Hope through Assistive Technology") Camp at Syracuse University's Burton Blatt Institute. At Syracuse's Newhouse School, he taught sports broadcasting as an adjunct professor.

Benetti is part of the Cerebral Palsy Foundation's "Just Say Hi" campaign.

== Play-by-play roles ==
Chicago White Sox

- Television broadcaster (2016–2023)

Detroit Tigers

- Television broadcaster (2024–present)

NBC Sports

- MLB on NBC
  - MLB Sunday Leadoff (2022–2023), lead broadcaster
  - Sunday Night Baseball (2026–present), lead broadcaster
- NCAA Basketball (2026–present), alternate broadcaster
- NCAA Football (2026–present), alternate broadcaster
  - Notre Dame Football on NBC (2026–present), lead broadcaster
- NBA on NBC (2026–present), secondary broadcaster

Fox Sports

- NCAA Basketball (2022–2026), secondary broadcaster
- NFL on Fox (2022–2025), secondary broadcaster

Preceded by Bob Costas (in 2000); Brendan Burke (in 2023)	Lead play-by-play announcer, Major League Baseball on NBC; 2022; 2026-present	Succeeded by Brendan Burke; Incumbent
