= Quintin E. Primo III =

American businessman

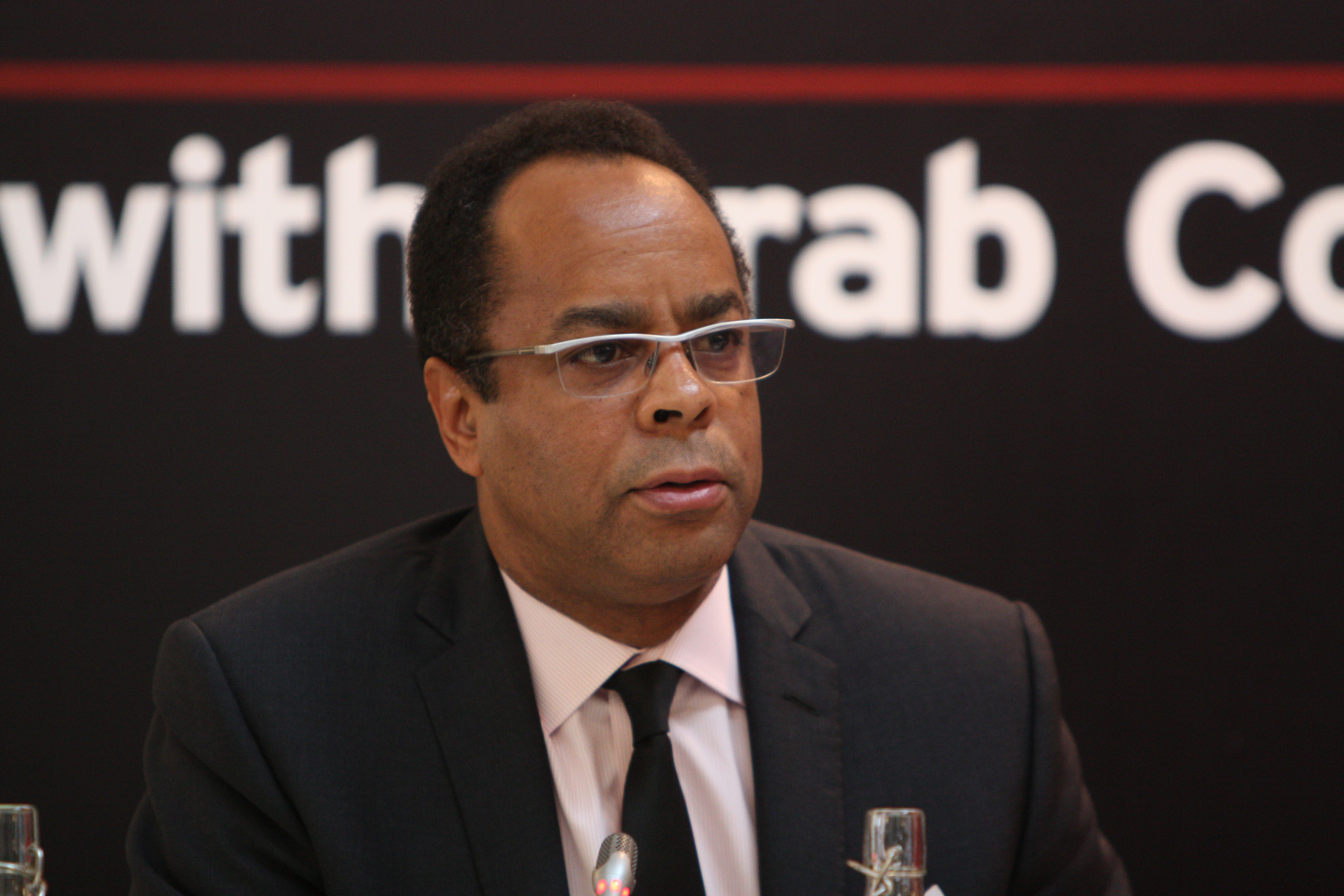
- Born: March 14, 1955 (age 71); Illinois
- Education: Indiana University Bloomington; Harvard Business School
- Occupation: Hedge fund manager

Quintin E. Primo III (born March 14, 1955) is the Co-Founder, Chairman and CEO of Capri Capital Partners, LLC, one of the largest minority-owned real estate investment management firms in the United States. Primo, whose firm has $6.04 billion in assets under management in domestic and international commercial real estate, is ranked on the Forbes' Top Twenty Richest African American's in the World list. Primo, a regular contributor on CNBC, has been recognized in the real estate industry for his achievements.

In 2000, under Primo's leadership, Capri Capital launched one of the first real estate mezzanine funds. As a minority-owned firm, Capri Capital was also an early investor in under-served urban markets such as South Los Angeles. In 2006, Capri capital purchased Baldwin Hills Crenshaw Plaza, a Los Angeles regional mall.

In 2012, Black Enterprise Magazine named Capri Capital as its Financial Services Company of the Year.

In September 2013, under Primo's direction, Capri Capital launched Capri Global Capital, Limited, formed as part of a strategic alliance with Money Matters Financial Services Limited in India. The Indian company was renamed Capri Global Capital Limited. Primo is the non-executive chairman and director of Capri Global Capital Limited's Board of Directors in India. Primo becomes one of, if not the first, African-American to serve on the board of an Indian-registered publicly listed company.

Primo is known for his philanthropy as the founder and chairman of the Primo Center for Women and Children, a transition homeless shelter in West Side, Chicago. He is a 1973 alumnus from Homewood-Flossmoor High School in Flossmoor, Illinois. He then attended Indiana University, where he earned a B.S. degree in finance and graduated with honors. He received his MBA from Harvard Business School in 1979. He is the son of Episcopal Bishop Quintin E. Primo Jr.
