= John Doody =

American politician (born 1945)

John Thomas Doody Jr. (born January 15, 1945) is an American politician who served as a Republican member of the Illinois House of Representatives from the 37th district from September 1995 until January 1997 and later a Judge of the Cook County Circuit Court.

== Biography ==
Doody was born January 15, 1945, in Evergreen Park, Illinois. He attended Illinois State University and St. Procopius College, graduating with a Bachelor of Arts from the latter institution. Doody later earned a Juris Doctor from John Marshall Law School. Doody was a soldier in the United States Army and is a veteran of the Vietnam War. Doody was, for a time, the Mayor of Homewood, Illinois.

Doody was elected a township trustee of Bloom Township in 1981, a village trustee for Homewood in 1983, and Village President of Homewood in 1991.

Doody was appointed to the Illinois House of Representatives and sworn into office on September 11, 1995, to succeed Ed Zabrocki, the Mayor of Tinley Park, Illinois, who had been elected in the 1994 elections. He was defeated by Democratic candidate Kevin McCarthy in the 1996 general election. Doody explored challenging McCarthy in the 1998 election, but opted out in favor of Maureen O'Hara who was supported by Minority Leader Lee Daniels.

After his 1996 loss, he became a member of the Homewood Public Library Board. In 2002, he became a Circuit Court Judge, a position he would hold until his retirement in 2013.

Preceded by Ed Zabrocki	Member of the Illinois House of Representatives from the 37th district September 1995 – January 1997	Succeeded by Kevin McCarthy
