= Homewood-Flossmoor High School =

Location
- 999 Kedzie Avenue; Flossmoor, Illinois 60422; United States; 41.545748°N 87.692558°W

Information
- School type: Public Secondary
- Motto: Dedicated to Excellence
- Opened: 1959
- School district: Homewood-Flossmoor Community HS 233
- Superintendent: Jennifer Norrell
- Principal: Clinton Alexander
- Staff: 301
- Grades: 9–12
- Gender: Coed
- Enrollment: 2,707 (2024–2025)
  - Grade 9: 584 students
  - Grade 10: 669 students
  - Grade 11: 740 students
  - Grade 12: 714 students
- Average class size: 23
- Area: South Suburbs
- Campus type: Suburban
- Colors: Red; White
- Fight song: Vikings Fight On
- Athletics conference: Southwest Suburban Conference
- Mascot: Victor Viking
- Team name: Vikings
- Accreditation: Illinois State Board of Education
- Newspaper: The Voyager
- Communities served: Homewood, Flossmoor, Chicago Heights, Glenwood, Hazel Crest and Olympia Fields
- Radio: WHFH (88.5 FM)
- Website: www.hfhighschool.org

Homewood-Flossmoor High School (H-F) is a comprehensive public high school in Flossmoor, Illinois, a south suburb of Chicago.

The school serves an area of nearly 11.5 square miles (30 km^{2}), drawing students from Homewood, Flossmoor, and parts of Chicago Heights, Glenwood, Hazel Crest, and Olympia Fields.

== Demographics ==
2024–2025 Race/Ethnicity

- Black – 73.8%
- White – 11.6%
- Hispanic – 9.8%
- Multiracial – 4.3%
- Asian – 0.6%

== Campus ==
The campus is spread out and consists of two main buildings: the North and South Buildings. The South Building contains a number of sub-buildings each assigned a letter, and includes the school's radio station (WHFH) 88.5 FM Flossmoor, television station VTV, a swimming pool, gymnasium, science building, and performing arts center. The North Building has three floors and includes the school's fieldhouse. Both buildings contain a cafeteria. An ice rink is also located on the campus, owned by the local park district.

In 2014, H-F took part in a multimillion-dollar ($26,070,000 contract) renovation of the North Building on campus. The renovations included a new 200-meter track containing four full-sized basketball, volleyball, and badminton courts in the center of the track. The 9,000-sq. ft. facility also contains cardio and training equipment. Additionally, a 50-yard indoor turf has expanded the playing and practice season for a variety of field sports and activities, including football, soccer, field hockey, baseball and marching band. The project was finished in late spring 2014. In 2015, H-F was awarded a Gold LEED Award for outstanding environmental practices in the construction of this addition. In 2019, the school began the first phase of its Fine Arts Expansion Project, which created a new music wing and black box theater, in addition to renovated visual arts classrooms. The project was completed in October 2020. In 2025, the school completed a net zero science building.

== History ==
Homewood-Flossmoor Community High School site opened in 1959 with enrollment at 1,170 students. There were 51 classrooms, which included 10 English classes, 10 Social Science, eight Science, six Mathematics, five Foreign Language, three Physical Education, one Homemaking, three Industrial Arts, two Art, and three Music classes. A cafeteria, library and administrative area were also included.

By 1965, the school's population had nearly doubled and additional buildings were added: Auditorium (1965), G Building (1966) and E Building (1966). As growth continued, it became apparent that a major new facility was needed, and in 1971, the North Building and fieldhouse opened when the student population topped 4,000.

Following a decade of preparation and fiscal planning, in 1995 a $25 million renovation and addition program was completed: all classrooms and offices were wired for internet access; a music wing was added, providing student practice and performance; a Technology Center and numerous labs to offer computer assisted instruction were completed; the Mall Building, located mid-campus near the football field and field house, was expanded, modernized and staffed, providing athletic training and rehabilitation of student athletes; a new Olympic sized aqua-center was opened; 14 tennis courts were added; and the student-run WHFH radio and TV stations were modernized.

In 1989, football coach John Wrenn proposed District 233 adopt a mandatory drug-testing policy similar to one at two Lafayette, Indiana high schools, where a recent landmark court case decision allowed the creation of such programs. H-F became the first high school in Illinois to require mandatory random drug testing for its student athletes.

In 1996, up to 20,000 people gathered on the school lawn to hear President Bill Clinton deliver a speech on education during his 1996 reelection campaign.

In addition to being named a Blue Ribbon School by the United States Department of Education three times, the school has received Department of Education Technology Award twice. In 1995, the school's technology plan was named one of the five best in the nation. In spring 2013, the International Baccalaureate (IB) Organization granted IB World School status to Homewood-Flossmoor. H-F now joins the exclusive company of approximately 3,000 IB World Schools that dot the globe across 138 countries.

In May 2019, Rev. Jesse Jackson led an assembly at the school to address a blackface incident that prompted a student walkout.

Beginning with the Class of 2020, the school offers a Media, Visual & Performing Arts Academy.

In August 2023, the school began the first phase of its Net Zero Science Building. The building was completed in the summer of 2025, and received an award of Distinction in 2025.

== Academics ==
H-F has a robust Advanced Placement program (25 AP courses in 2017–18); a five-course Project Lead the Way STEM program; and a Media, Visual & Performing Arts Academy (MVP). In 2012–13, it became the first public high school in Chicago's suburbs to earn the International Baccalaureate World School status.

H-F has been named one of Newsweek's top 1,000 schools on several occasions in recent years: 2013, 2012, 2010, 2009 (#1142), 2008 (#746), 2007 (#682), 2006 (#849), 2005 (#744), and 2003 (#518). In 2017 it was also ranked as one of America's Most Challenging High Schools by The Washington Post. It is a three-time U.S. Department of Education Blue Ribbon Award Winner (1983, 1996, 2002), and continues to be ranked nationally, including as one of America’s Best High Schools by U.S. News & World Report in 2020.

H-F's Visual Arts Department was named the Best School Art Program in the state in 2013 by the Illinois Art Education Association.

In 1990 there was a proposal that would allow a student to substitute an academic class in place of a physical education requirement. The school district administration approved this change effective fall 1991. Students after the change were allowed to take another course if they stated that they intended to enter a university and showed a university course catalog with the desired subject area.

USGS satellite photo of H-F HS

== Fine arts department ==
H-F offers a fine arts program, which includes courses in music, theatre, and visual arts. There are over 50 courses offered. About 39% of H-F students are enrolled in at least one fine arts course

=== Music ===
H-F's music department includes three core programs: band, orchestra, and choir. As well as ensembles of these programs, additional classes are offered at HF, such as AP Music Theory, Industry of Music, and Guitar Ensembles. Band, orchestra, and choir ensembles each take turns touring a foreign country once every year, during spring break. Each program consists of multiple ensembles, curricular and extra-curricular.

Students enrolled in the band program participate in one of three ensembles: Concert Band, Wind Ensemble (Honors), or Symphonic Band (Honors). Percussionists are placed in Concert Band Percussion Ensemble or Honors Percussion Ensemble. Extra-curricular programs are the music pit orchestra, jazz ensemble, and jazz combos. Band students have the opportunity to audition to participate in the Illinois Music Educators Association (ILMEA) annual festival honors ensembles. H-F's Viking Jazz Ensemble was one of few ensembles in the state selected to perform at the Illinois Music Educators Association 2018 Conference, and will perform at the Illinois Music Educators Association 2025 Conference. All musicians in the H-F band program come together to form Viking Marching Band.

The orchestra program has three ensembles: Chamber Orchestra, Sinfonia Strings (Honors), and Viking Orchestra (Honors). Students in all ensembles can also participate in the pit orchestra, as well as audition for ILMEA honors ensembles.

Choir has two ensembles: Concert Choir (Honors) and Viking Choir (Honors). Students can also audition for Viking Ensemble (an extra-curricular small ensemble) or for ILMEA ensembles.

=== Drama ===
H-F's drama programs involve both curricular offerings and co-curricular productions. Five courses make up the curricular program: Acting, Theatre Production, Advanced Theatre Performance, Technical Theatre I, and Technical Theatre II. The H-F Theatre Department has won 17 State Championships in Drama, alone.

The International Thespian Society (ITS) is an honor society for high school theatre students. This organization's chapter, International Thespian Society Troupe #2062, promotes theatre quality at Homewood-Flossmoor. Students who are involved in Homewood-Flossmoor productions of the Children's Play, Contest Play, Group Interpretation, High School Play, Leaders in Theatre Ensemble, Musical, New Faces, and Reader's Theatre are awarded points. Activities of the group include monthly meetings, improving the theatre, attending plays and participating in festivals.

H-F's drama programs involve both curricular offerings and co-curricular productions. H-F produces seven Mainstage shows in a school year. H-F holds the Illinois record for State Championships in Drama, with 17 State Championships. H-F also holds the record for top three finishes in Drama and Group Interpretation. HF also has 3 State Championships in Group Interpretation.

=== Visual arts ===
H-F's Visual Arts Department was named the best in the state of Illinois in 2013 by the Illinois Art Education Association. Programs offered:

- AP Art History
- AP Studio Art
- Art Concentration
- 2D Studio 1
- 2D Studio 2
- 3D Studio 1
- Yearbook
- Interactive Web Design
- Photography 1
- Photography 2
- Graphic Design 1
- Graphic Design 2
- Fundamentals of Art & Design

== Athletics ==
H-F competes in the Southwest Suburban Conference (SWSC) and is a member of the Illinois High School Association (IHSA), the organization which governs most sports and competitive activities in Illinois. Teams are stylized as the Vikings.

The school sponsors interscholastic teams for young men and women in basketball, cross country, golf, gymnastics, soccer, swimming & diving, tennis, track & field, volleyball, and water polo. Young men may compete in baseball, football, lacrosse, and wrestling, while young women may compete in badminton, cheerleading and softball. While not sponsored by the IHSA, the school also sponsors an ice hockey team for young men as well as field hockey and poms teams for young women.

The school also offers a fencing team at a club level, which participates in the Great Lakes High School Conference every winter.

The following teams have won their respective IHSA sponsored state championship tournament or meet:

- Basketball (Boys): 2023–24
- Football: 1994–95
- Golf (Boys): 1969–70
- Golf (Girls): 1979–80, 1981–82, 1984–85, 1985–86, 1997–98, 2009–10
- Gymnastics (Boys): 1996–97
- Tennis (Girls): 1989–90
- Track and Field (Boys): 2022–23
- Track and Field (Girls): 2018–19, 2024–25, 2025–26

== Activities ==
The following activities won their respective IHSA sponsored state championship competition:

- Debate: 1973–74
- DECA: Multiple state and national championships in various events including Quiz Bowl
- Drama
  - Drama: 1966–67, 1972–73, 1973–74, 1974–75, 1975–76, 1976–77, 1980–81, 1981–82, 1982–83, 1983–84, 1985–86, 1987–88, 1997–98, 1998–99, 1999–2000, 2000–01, 2001–02
  - Group Interpretation: 1995–96, 1999–2000, 2006–07, 2017–18
- Journalism: 2010–11, 2015–16
- Speech
  - Speech: 1967–68, 1968–69, 1970–71
  - Individual Events: 1967–68, 1974–75, 1980–81, 1983–84

== Notable faculty ==
- Von Mansfield, former superintendent; former NFL defensive back
- Charles J. Shields, counselor, English teacher, and Chair of the English department (1979–1997); author of Mockingbird: A Portrait of Harper Lee, the first biography written about author Harper Lee, reached No. 15 on the New York Times Non-fiction Bestseller List

== Notable alumni ==
- Seun Adigun (2005) – Nigerian-American bobsledder, and track and field runner
- Maryum Ali (1986) – author, former stand-up comedian and rap artist; eldest daughter of boxer Muhammad Ali
- Uzo Asonye (1998) – attorney who led prosecution in Paul Manafort trial
- Freddie Barnes (2005) – former professional football player
- femdot. (2013) – Rapper and Educator
- Jason Benetti (2001) – sports play-by-play announcer who calls Detroit Tigers telecasts
- Michael Buchanan (2009) – NFL player. Super Bowl XLIX champion New England Patriots; recorded first sack for Patriots during the 2013 season
- Kenneth Choi (1989) – film and TV actor (The Wolf of Wall Street), (Sons of Anarchy; The People vs. OJ Simpson)
- Kris Cooke (2006) – former professional arena football player
- T. J. Cummings (2000) – former UCLA and pro basketball player
- Sophia Danenberg (1990) – Fulbright Scholar and international policy analyst for Boeing, first African American to climb Mount Everest
- Borzou Daragahi (1987) – twice a finalist for the Pulitzer Prize, covered events in Baghdad and Beirut
- Casey Driessen (1997) – bluegrass fiddler and singer
- John Ely (2004) – former MLB pitcher
- Ryan Flournoy (2018) – NFL football player, Dallas Cowboys
- Rockie Fresh (2009) – rapper, signed to Rick Ross' Maybach Music Group and Atlantic Records
- Jack Fuller (1964) – Pulitzer Prize-winning journalist (1986) who became editor and publisher of Tribune Company (deceased)
- Zach Fulton (2010) – NFL offensive lineman for the Houston Texans.
- Chuck Garfien (1989) – reporter and studio host for NBC SportsNet Chicago
- Andrew Gertler (2007) – president of AG Artists, manager of recording artists Rockie Fresh and Shawn Mendes
- Wes Hamilton (1971) – former NFL offensive lineman (1976–85), Minnesota Vikings
- Marcus Harper II (2020) – offensive lineman for the Oregon Ducks
- Nolan Harrison (1986) – senior director of former player services at NFL Players Association, former NFL defensive lineman for the Oakland Raiders, Pittsburgh Steelers & Washington Redskins (1991–2000)
- Gitte Haslebo (1961) – Danish psychologist
- David Hemenway (1962) – director of Injury Control Research Center at Harvard University
- Eric Hillman (1984) – former MLB pitcher
- Astead Herndon (2010) – journalist at The New York Times
- Jarad Higgins (2017) – professionally known as Juice Wrld, rapper and singer songwriter
- Christine Korsgaard (1970) – Arthur Kingsley Porter Professor of Philosophy at Harvard University
- Ariel McDonald – former basketball player; Israeli Basketball Premier League MVP
- George Nolfi (1984) – screenwriter and director; directed 2011 film The Adjustment Bureau, wrote screenplay for Ocean's Twelve, co-wrote The Bourne Ultimatum
- Tai Odiase (2014) – Nigerian American and naturalized Puerto Rican player for Hapoel Tel Aviv of the Israeli Israeli Basketball Premier League
- Nnedi Okorafor (1992) – associate professor of creative writing & literature at the University of Buffalo, author of African-based fantasy and science fiction novels; received the World Fantasy Award for her novel, Who Fears Death
- Stacy Osei-Kuffour (2005) – writer
- Susan D. Page (1982) – former and first U.S. Ambassador to the Republic of South Sudan; U.N. Secretary General's deputy special representative to the U.S. Stabilization Mission in Haiti
- Quintin E. Primo III (1973) – co-founder, chairman and CEO of Capri Investment Group
- Kendric Pryor (2016) – wide receiver for the Jacksonville Jaguars
- Sarah Bloom Raskin (1979) – former U.S. Deputy Secretary of the Treasury, confirmed in March 2014
- Larry Rothschild (1971) – former pitching coach for the Chicago Cubs and New York Yankees; pitching coach for the San Diego Padres
- Margaret A. Ryan (1981) – judge of the U.S. Court of Appeals for the U.S. Armed Forces.
- Andrew Schapiro (1981) – former U.S. Ambassador to the Czech Republic, Supreme Court clerk and Marshall Scholar
- Tyler Schlaffer (2019) – baseball pitcher for the Chicago Cubs organization
- John Michael Schmitz (2017) – NFL football player, New York Giants
- Shawnna – rapper, daughter of Chicago blues artist Buddy Guy; was a member of the Chicago rap duo Infamous Syndicate
- Chad Smith (1980 – transferred) – drummer, Red Hot Chili Peppers, moved after two years and graduated from Lahser High School in Bloomfield Hills, Michigan
- Joy Woods (2018) – Tony Award-nominated actress and singer known for her work on Broadway (Gypsy, The Notebook, Six)
- Julian Wright (2005) – former first-round NBA draft pick
