= Flossmoor, Illinois =

- Village
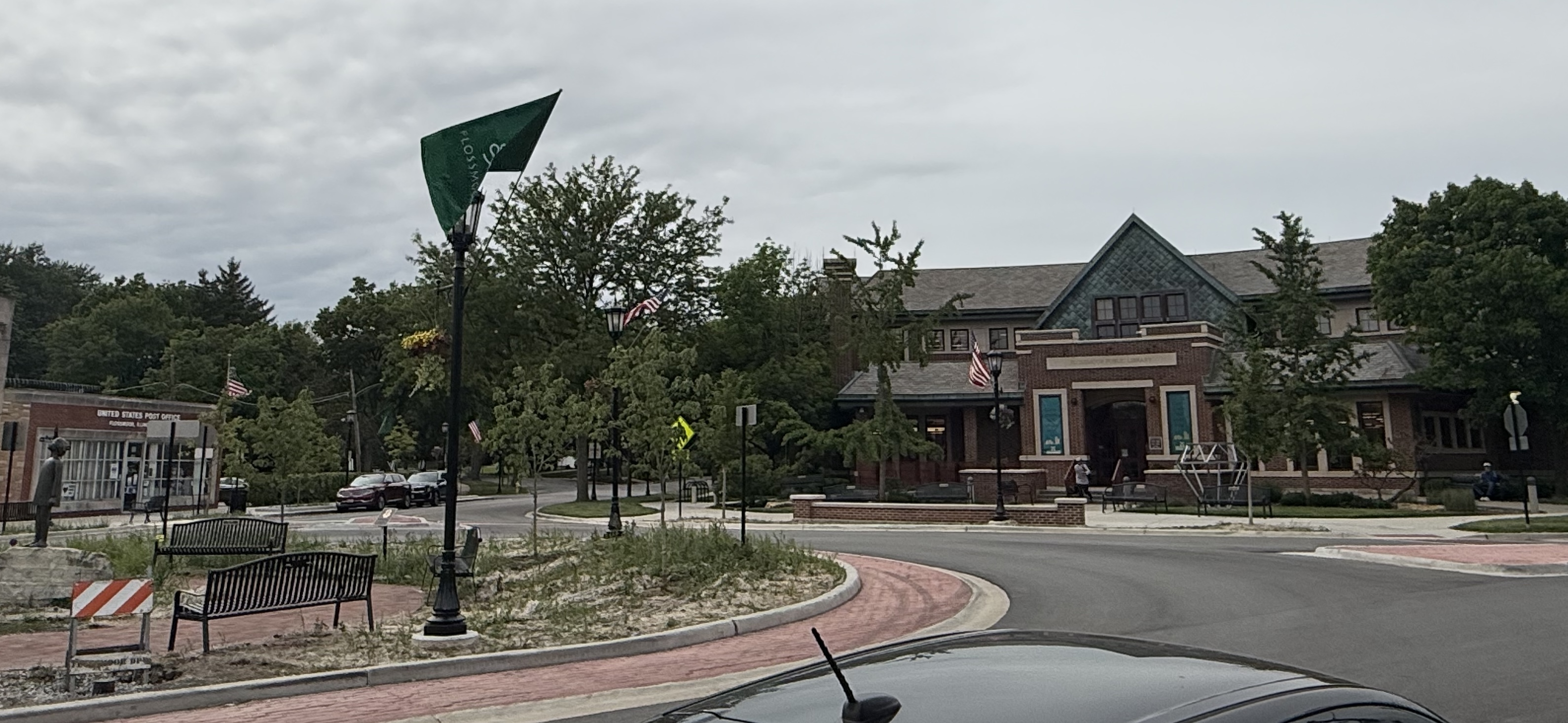
- Downtown Flossmoor

- logo

- Location of Flossmoor in Cook County, Illinois.

- Location within Chicago metropolitan area Location within Illinois Location within the United States
- Coordinates: 41°32′30″N 87°41′6″W
- Country: United States
- State: Illinois
- County: Cook
- Township: Rich, Bloom
- Incorporated: 1924

Government
  - Type: Village
  - Mayor: Michelle Nelson

Area
  - Total: 3.66 sq mi (9.48 km^{2})
  - Land: 3.66 sq mi (9.48 km^{2})
  - Water: 0 sq mi (0.00 km^{2}) 0%

Population (2020)
  - Total: 9,704
  - Density: 2,650.4/sq mi (1,023.34/km^{2})
- ZIP code(s): 60422
- Area code(s): 708
- Geocode: 26571
- FIPS code: 17-26571
- Website: flossmoor.org

Flossmoor (/ˈflɒsmɔːr/) is a village in Cook County, Illinois, United States. The population was 9,704 at the 2020 census. Flossmoor is approximately 24 miles (39 km) south of the Chicago Loop. It is closely tied to neighboring Homewood, sharing a high school and park district.

== History ==
Although Flossmoor's founding and settlement can be traced to the 19th century, the city was first recognized as an affluent community in the 1920s when it became known as a cultural and recreational mecca of elite country clubs and stately golf courses.

The 1920 PGA Championship and the Western Open golf tournaments of 1906 and 1912 were held in town. Flossmoor was incorporated as a village in 1924. In the years since, Flossmoor has gained recognition from area real estate and tourist concerns as the "status" suburb of south/southwest suburban Chicago. By the 1970s, Flossmoor had transitioned from a white Protestant community to the home of many Jewish Americans and Italian Americans. As of the 2010s, Flossmoor's population is predominantly African American.

== Geography ==
According to the 2021 census gazetteer files, Flossmoor has a total area of 3.66 square miles (9.48 km^{2}), all land. Flossmoor has a station on the Metra Electric Main Line, which provides access to the Chicago Loop and the University of Chicago.

== Demographics ==
Historical population
| Census | Pop. | Note | %± |
|---|---|---|---|
| 1930 | 808 | | — |
| 1940 | 1,270 | | 57.2% |
| 1950 | 1,804 | | 42.0% |
| 1960 | 4,624 | | 156.3% |
| 1970 | 7,846 | | 69.7% |
| 1980 | 8,423 | | 7.4% |
| 1990 | 8,651 | | 2.7% |
| 2000 | 9,301 | | 7.5% |
| 2010 | 9,464 | | 1.8% |
| 2020 | 9,704 | | 2.5% |
U.S. Decennial Census; 2010 2020

=== Racial and ethnic composition ===
Flossmoor, Illinois – Racial and ethnic composition Note: the US Census treats Hispanic/Latino as an ethnic category. This table excludes Latinos from the racial categories and assigns them to a separate category. Hispanics/Latinos may be of any race.
| Race / Ethnicity (NH = Non-Hispanic) | Pop 2000 | Pop 2010 | Pop 2020 | % 2000 | % 2010 | % 2020 |
|---|---|---|---|---|---|---|
| White alone (NH) | 6,041 | 4,235 | 2,958 | 64.95% | 44.75% | 30.48% |
| Black or African American alone (NH) | 2,490 | 4,462 | 5,645 | 26.77% | 47.15% | 58.17% |
| Native American or Alaska Native alone (NH) | 2 | 6 | 9 | 0.02% | 0.06% | 0.09% |
| Asian alone (NH) | 393 | 240 | 187 | 4.23% | 2.54% | 1.93% |
| Native Hawaiian or Pacific Islander alone (NH) | 0 | 2 | 4 | 0.00% | 0.02% | 0.04% |
| Other race alone (NH) | 13 | 34 | 41 | 0.14% | 0.36% | 0.42% |
| Mixed race or Multiracial (NH) | 139 | 182 | 398 | 1.49% | 1.92% | 4.10% |
| Hispanic or Latino (any race) | 223 | 303 | 462 | 2.40% | 3.20% | 4.76% |
| Total | 9,301 | 9,464 | 9,704 | 100.00% | 100.00% | 100.00% |

=== 2020 census ===
As of the 2020 census, Flossmoor had a population of 9,704, with 3,527 households and 2,499 families residing in the village.

The population density was 2,650.64 inhabitants per square mile (1,023.42/km^{2}). There were 3,702 housing units at an average density of 1,011.20 per square mile (390.43/km^{2}). Of the 3,702 housing units, 4.7% were vacant. The homeowner vacancy rate was 2.4% and the rental vacancy rate was 7.9%.

The median age was 45.0 years. 21.9% of residents were under the age of 18 and 20.9% were 65 years of age or older. For every 100 females, there were 88.6 males, and for every 100 females age 18 and over, there were 83.7 males age 18 and over.

100.0% of residents lived in urban areas, while 0.0% lived in rural areas.

Of households, 34.9% had children under the age of 18 living in them. Of all households, 55.5% were married-couple households, 11.6% were households with a male householder and no spouse or partner present, and 29.7% were households with a female householder and no spouse or partner present. About 21.5% of all households were made up of individuals and 12.3% had someone living alone who was 65 years of age or older.

=== Income and poverty ===
The median income for a household in the village was $107,271, and the median income for a family was $119,836. Males had a median income of $80,609 versus $57,873 for females. The per capita income for the village was $56,195. About 4.0% of families and 10.0% of the population were below the poverty line, including 10.2% of those under age 18 and 3.2% of those age 65 or over.

== Government ==
Flossmoor is in Illinois's 2nd congressional district. It has an elected mayor, Michelle Nelson, and elected village trustees, as well as a professional village manager, Bridget Wachtel.

== Education ==
Children in grades K-8, attend schools under the jurisdiction of Flossmoor School District 161. School District 161 has four elementary schools, Western Avenue, Serena Hills, Flossmoor Hills, and Heather Hill, all of which serve students in grades K-5. After attending elementary school, students go to Mardell M. Parker Junior High School, which serves children in grades 6–8.

The majority of students in the area then go on to attend the local public high school, Homewood-Flossmoor High School, which is a three-time recipient of the U.S. Department of Education's Blue Ribbon Award for excellence.

Flossmoor is home to Infant Jesus of Prague School, a private, Roman Catholic K-8 school operated by St. Veronica Parish, formerly Infant Jesus of Prague Parish, which merged in 2022 with St. Irenaeus in Park Forest IL (permanently closed) and St. Lawrence O'Toole in Matteson IL (also permanently closed). IJP, as the school is known, is a two-time winner of the U.S. Department of Education's Blue Ribbon Award.

== Transportation ==
The Flossmoor station provides Metra commuter rail service along the Metra Electric District. Trains travel north to Millennium station in Chicago, and south to University Park station.

== Notable people ==
- Tai Odiase, basketball player in the Israeli Basketball Premier League
- Nnedi Okorafor, fantasy writer
- Astead Herndon, New York Times journalist
- John Dean, White House Counsel for Richard Nixon
- Michael Beschloss, political historian
- Stephen Douglas Johnson, politician
- Xavier Fulton, former NFL offensive tackle
- Brian Kerwin, actor
- Philip Hart Cullom, retired United States Navy vice admiral
- Jason Benetti, broadcaster for the Chicago White Sox
- Andy Tennant, actor and screenwriter
