= Steve Hagerty =

American businessman and mayor

Stephen H. Hagerty
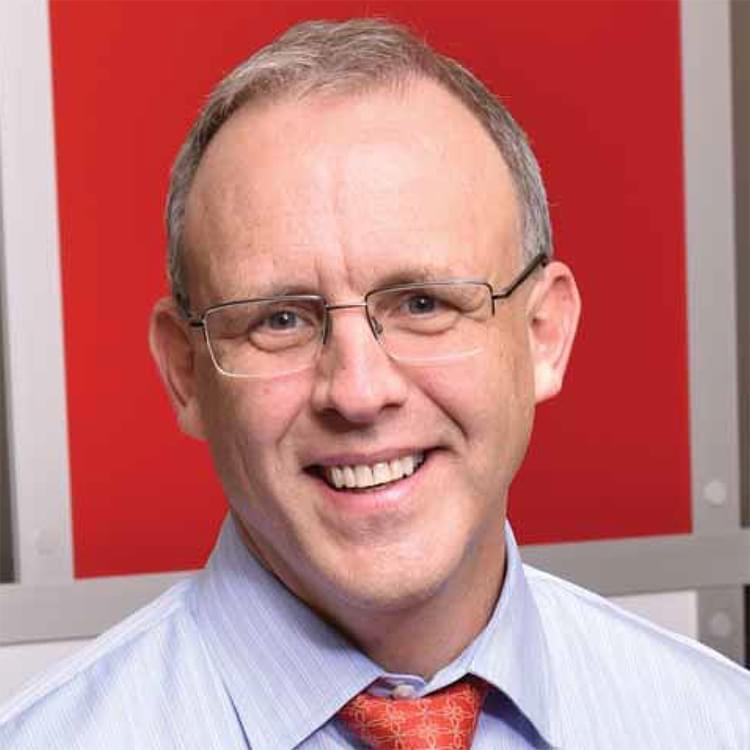
- Hagerty in 2022

21st Mayor of Evanston, Illinois
- In office May 8, 2017 – May 10, 2021
- Preceded by: Elizabeth Tisdahl
- Succeeded by: Daniel Biss

Personal details
- Born: November 15, 1968 (age 57) Attleboro, Massachusetts, U.S.
- Party: Democratic
- Spouse: Lisa Altenbernd
- Children: 2
- Parent(s): John Hagerty and Charlotte Edgecombe
- Education: Syracuse University

Stephen H. Hagerty (born November 15, 1968) is an American entrepreneur, businessman, and politician. Born in Attleboro, Massachusetts, He was the 21st mayor of Evanston, Illinois from May 8, 2017, to May 10, 2021. A month after Hagerty retired from office, Evanston was recognized as an All-American City by the National Civic League due to its local reparations initiative and Evanston Cares Network, both of which occurred during his administration.

== Early life and education ==
Hagerty grew up in Attleboro, Massachusetts. As a teenager, he worked on his family's farm, selling milk and garden produce to his neighbors, and served as a paper boy for his local newspaper, The Sun Chronicle. While attending Attleboro High School, Hagerty played as the only boy on the all-girls field hockey team his senior year before graduating in 1987. Hagerty attended Syracuse University, receiving a degree in consumer studies in 1991, and earned his Master of Public Administration from Syracuse's Maxwell School of Citizenship and Public Affairs in 1993. He moved to Evanston with his wife, Lisa Altenbernd, in 2001.

== Career and community involvement ==
Hagerty worked in the Office of Government Services at Price Waterhouse and subsequently PricewaterhouseCoopers, consulting with the Federal Emergency Management Agency, before founding his own emergency management firm, Hagerty Consulting, in 2001. After the September 11 attacks, Hagerty and his firm helped manage the federal government's $7.4 billion public assistance fund. Hagerty Consulting also assisted in the response and recovery efforts after Hurricane Katrina, Superstorm Sandy, Hurricane Michael, Hurricane Maria, the California Wildfires, the 2021 Texas Winter Storm, and the COVID-19 pandemic.

Hagerty's involvement in the Evanston community included seats on the Boards of Directors of Youth & Opportunity United, a youth development agency, and of local financial institution First Bank & Trust. He also served as president of the Evanston Chamber of Commerce. In 2015, Hagerty chaired a city committee to explore options for the dilapidated Harley Clarke Mansion, a source of political controversy.

== Mayor of Evanston, Illinois ==
=== 2017 mayoral campaign ===
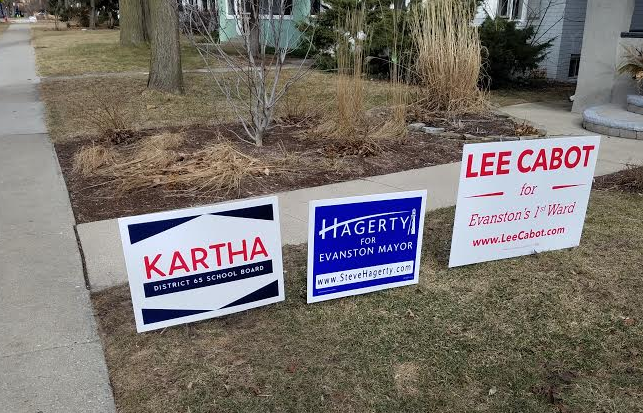
Lawn signs for Hagerty (center) and other Evanston candidates in February 2017

After Mayor Elizabeth Tisdahl announced her decision not to run for a third term, Hagerty announced his candidacy for mayor on October 18, 2016, becoming the third candidate out of an eventual five. His status on the ballot was briefly threatened by an objection from a supporter of Mayoral candidate Brian Miller, who claimed Hagerty's petitions did not cite the correct date of the election. After the electoral board dismissed this objection, fellow candidate Jeff Smith contested Hagerty's petitions, citing a 1992 city referendum changing the ballot procedure when multiple candidates run for the same office. This complaint was also dismissed by the electoral board. Hagerty's campaign quickly emerged ahead in fundraising; by January 2017, it had raised over $100,000, about half of which came from Hagerty himself. By March, Hagerty's campaign had raised more than all four other candidates combined.

Hagerty was endorsed by all living preceding mayors of Evanston: Tisdahl, Lorraine Morton, and Jay Lytle, as well as and Cook County Commissioner Larry Suffredin.

Hagerty was not endorsed by US Representative Jan Schakowsky, who endorsed his opponent, Alderman Mark Tendam.

Although it was a non-partisan election, the Democratic Party of Evanston (DPOE) held an endorsement session. No mayoral candidate secured 66% of the vote so no endorsement was given, but Hagerty received the most absolute votes.

In the Mayoral primary on February 28, 2017, Hagerty received 44.4% of the vote, advancing him to a runoff election facing sixth ward Alderman Mark Tendam, who won 20.5%. Despite Hagerty's lead in the primary, the runoff election on April 4, 2017, was surprisingly close, with less than a one percent margin separating Hagerty and Tendam. Tendam conceded the race six days later. The final election results showed Hagerty winning by just 115 votes, out of 17,899 votes.

=== Mayoral administration ===
Hagerty was sworn into office on May 8, 2017. Members of the 79th Evanston City Council's Rules Committee had raised concerns about a possible conflict of interest before Hagerty was sworn in, since First Bank and Trust, on whose Board of Directors Hagerty sat, was the city's financial institution, but Hagerty stepped down from the Board before taking office.

Hagerty's agenda as mayor included economic development, affordable housing, city infrastructure, and youth development and public safety. His final 15 months was consumed with leading the city's COVID-19 response once he declared a local state of emergency on March 15, 2020, the first City in Illinois to do so.

==== Economic development ====
During Hagerty's term, and until the COVID-19 pandemic, the City recorded record low unemployment and vacancy rates, increasing property values, and steadily increasing tax revenue. This was due in part to Hagerty and the council's emphasis on transit-oriented design, adding 1,000 new housing units to Evanston and 3,624 new residents according to the 2020 census results, all in a state with a declining population. Major new commercial developments included Centrum Evanston, Noyes Loft, The Link, Albion, 601 Davis, 1727 Oak Ave, and 1815 Ridge. Additional community amenities included Out of Space Concert Series, Downtown Target, Evanston's first Pridefest, Theo Ubique Theater, and many new breweries and stores.

==== Affordable housing ====
Hagerty signed a new Inclusionary Housing Policy to increase the number of affordable housing units in new developments and lifting the opt-out fee from $100,000 to $175,000. He also approved an ordinance allowing residents to have attached and unattached accessory dwelling units (ADUs). Hagerty advocated for and supported the first Housing Authority of Cook County (HACC) low income and missing middle apartment complex for seniors, paid for by market-rate apartments. During Hagerty's term, the Illinois Development Housing Agency (IDHA) reported that 17.5% of housing units in Evanston were affordable, relative to 15.4% in 2013.

==== Infrastructure ====
Hagerty approved and the City constructed the award-winning $53M Robert Crown multi-use community center, which included a library, early childhood program, two ice rinks, a multi-sport gymnasium, and turf fields; the award-winning $6M modern redesign and renovation of Fountain Square; the award-winning redesign of Chicago Avenue and Sheridan Road adopting a complete street approach to more safely accommodate bikers, pedestrians, public transportation, and vehicles; and the interior renovation of the Fleetwood-Jourdain Community Center, located in the heart of the Fifth Ward, Evanston's historically Black center, allocating funds from Northwestern's Good Neighbor Fund.

==== Public safety and youth development ====
Hagerty established a Citizen Committee to review Evanston's police complaint process and recommend improvements. This led to the creation of an oversight body, the Citizen Police Review Commission, and the expansion of body cameras for all Evanston police officers. Hagerty established the Alternatives to Arrest Committee to reassign misdemeanor charges from the Criminal Courthouse to the local Administrative Adjudication process; automatically expunging juvenile municipal records; and connecting youth with Family advocates who help them and their family assess their needs, navigate public health benefits, and access restorative justice. Hagerty expanded the Youth & Young Adult Division to focus on workforce development opportunities through the creation of the Mayor's Employers Advisory Council (MEAC) partnership.

During the social unrest following the murder of George Floyd, Hagerty had the City establish a Police Frequently Asked Questions page to provide greater transparency into current policing in Evanston. He committed to conduct a 90-day evaluation of the Evanston Police Use of Force policies as part of his pledge to the Obama Foundation's reimaging policing initiative. This evaluation was completed in partnership with Northwestern's Neighborhood Network (3N) Initiative. He also committed to have the police conduct an investigation, including review of all body worn police video, into a May 2020 use of force takedown. Lastly, he held a 9-part series live on Facebook and local television in July and August 2020 to increase the understanding of policing in Evanston and the experience of the young Black male in Evanston. Former President Obama praised Evanston for its collaborative efforts to develop recommendations to change the city's use of force policy and improve training and accountability standards.

==== Water sales ====
Hagerty expanded water sales to Niles, Morton Grove, Lincolnwood, and Skokie entering into decades long agreements to provide wholesale water to these communities. During his term, Hagerty authorized the construction of the $20M award-winning Clearwell 9 project, replacing a 5-million-gallon underground tank on Northwestern's property.

==== COVID-19 ====
Under Hagerty's leadership, Evanston was the first city in Illinois to declare a local state of emergency, activate its Emergency Operation Center, and establish a Mayors' Coronavirus Task Force. Throughout the pandemic, Hagerty communicated extensively with residents, held Coronavirus Q&A sessions, and preached a whole of community effort to the city's response and recovery. He was part of the unified command at the EOC. Under Hagerty's leadership the City recorded one of the lowest positivity rates per capita, fatality rates per capita, and highest vaccination rates of all urban ring cities in the United States. Despite his active involvement in the response and recovery effort, Hagerty was criticized for getting vaccinated in late January 2020 because some believed he did not qualify as an essential worker. The city's Health Department Director, Ike Ogbo, claimed Hagerty was essential and needed to be vaccinated because he worked in the EOC.

==== Northwestern University Good Neighbor Fund ====
Hagerty directly allocated $4 million in good neighbor funds to infrastructure, human services, and public safety projects during his four-year term. In addition, he negotiated a one-year extension and $1.5M increase in the Good Neighbor Fund through 2021 to be focused on equity related projects.

==== Equity, empowerment, and reparations ====
During his term, Hagerty and the Council focused heavily on racial injustice and inequity. Hagerty appointed the first Equity and Empowerment Commission, led by Rev. Dr. Patricia Efiom, the city's first Chief Equity Officer. He supported and signed a unanimously adopted Council resolution committing to end structural racism and achieve racial equity, acknowledging the city's past discriminatory practices and affirming the city's commitment to eradicate racism. Hagerty supported and signed the nation's first reparations fund, allocating $10M of the city's new cannabis revenue to be specifically invested into the Evanston Black community. Hagerty supported and signed the first $400K allocation of the Fund to create a restorative housing reparations program. The creation of this program was controversial as some residents felt that the funds should go directly to residents and not designate a specific use or go through a third party. Prior to completing his term, Hagerty appointed a 4-person Reparations Committee, led by Alderman Peter Braithwaite, with input from Mayor-Elect Daniel Biss to help implement the reparations program. This Committee included retiring Alderman Robin Rue Simmons who is widely recognized as leading the reparations movement in Evanston. Hagerty also established the city's first pilot guaranteed income program directly allocating money from the Northwestern Good Neighbor Fund.

==== Environment ====
In June 2017, following President Donald Trump's announcement of withdrawal from the Paris climate agreement, Hagerty reiterated the city's commitment to climate action, reaffirming his support of the Compact of Mayors and the Climate Mayors coalition. In 2018, Hagerty committed Evanston to become the first City in Illinois to secure renewable energy for all Evanston properties by 2030, carbon neutrality by 2050, and zero waste by 2050. These commitments were made based on a 17-person task force Hagerty appointed to develop the Climate Action Resilience Plan (CARP) to guide the city's actions over the next decade. The US Conference of Mayor recognized Hagerty for Evanston's outstanding and innovative practices that increase energy efficiency, expand renewable energy, and reduce carbon emissions.

=== Controversies ===
==== Minimum wage ====
Following an October 2016 Cook County Board measure to gradually increase the county minimum wage to $13, many suburban municipalities passed measures overriding the wage hike just days before the first incremental increase to $10 on Saturday, July 1, 2017, including neighboring Wilmette and Skokie. Hagerty called an emergency meeting of the Evanston City Council on Friday, June 30, 2017, in order to give the Evanston community an opportunity to discuss the issue and temporarily suspend the decision until its next public council meeting in July. The announcement was met with criticism from local leaders, including City Clerk Devon Reid, who stated that a minimum wage increase was not a "bona fide emergency" and therefore did not qualify for an impromptu emergency meeting under the Illinois Open Meetings Act. Further, Hagerty was attacked for calling the minimum wage increase "a fiscal danger to Evanston's businesses and the City of Evanston's future tax revenues," even though he supported such an increase during his campaign. At the emergency meeting, Hagerty did not call the meeting to order and members of the council announced that a vote on the override measure would not take place, expressing support for the wage increase. A week later, Skokie opted in to the minimum wage increase, and a year later, Wilmette did, too. Two months later, the Illinois Attorney General's office determined that the meeting had indeed violated the Open Meetings Act, although no remedial action was taken.

==== Evanston Township High School commencement ====
Hagerty was chosen to be the 2018 Evanston Township High School commencement speaker. The student newspaper, the Evanstonian, criticized the decision with an editorial titled, Graduation Needs a Wildkit, not Mayor Hagerty. They claimed Hagerty was a poor choice because he did not grow up in Evanston, did not send his kids to school in Evanston, and his sense of the community was misguided. Despite the call for a different speaker, Hagerty renewed his commitment to speak at graduation, rewrote his speech, and shared with the 864 graduate and 7,000 attendees at the Sears Arena what he thinks it means to be in Evanstonian and, by extension, a Wildkit.

==== Defund the Police protests ====
After the deaths of Ahmoud Arbery, Breonna Taylor, and George Floyd, the group, Evanston Fights for Black Lives, demanded that Hagerty and the City Council defund the Evanston police department. Hagerty refused to commit to do so. Instead, he signed the Obama pledge to reimagine policing, examined Evanston's use of force policies, and hosted a nine-week live series on television and social media about policing in Evanston. At the first virtual meeting, about 50 activists protested Hagerty in front of his home.

==== Blake Peters Day ====
After Evanston Township High School sophomore Blake Peters hit a last-minute, three-quarters court shot with one second left in the game to beat Maine South 45–44, becoming the #1 ESPN shot of the game, with 2.5 million views, Hagerty declared January 29, 2018, Blake Peters Day. Hagerty noted that Peters' shot was a great reminder that the impossible is sometimes possible. Within hours, a petition was circulated to revoke Blake Peters Day, criticizing Hagerty for recognizing something as trivial as a basketball player's shot.

==== Release of highly sensitive FOIA information ====
After taking office, City Clerk Devon Reid made a unilateral decision to make all FOIA responses public on the Internet; rather than just send the response to the requester, as required by law. Soon thereafter, Hagerty learned that the Clerk released private information of juveniles involved in police incidents and a female resident's sexual assault allegation to the public. Hagerty and the council, under Alderman Don Wilson's leadership, passed a measure temporarily taking down the public FOIA system, Next Request, in order to protect the privacy of residents.

==== Skokie water dispute ====
After years of failing to reach an agreement on a new water contract, Evanston asked the Court to set the new wholesale price of water with Skokie. Soon thereafter, Skokie filed a federal lawsuit against Evanston and Hagerty claiming the city was gauging Skokie and violating their constitutional right to water. Hagerty insisted that Skokie needed to pay its fair share and that Evanston residents would no longer subsidize Skokie's water. Skokie then abruptly canceled a mutual aid agreement, disallowing Evanston Fire to use Skokie's Fire Training facility. After three years of legal battles with the federal court dismissing Skokie's lawsuit, Evanston and Skokie agreed on a new 20 year wholesale water contract, with Skokie paying a rate that covered all of Evanston's operational, maintenance, and distribution costs. Skokie also reopened its fire training facility to the Evanston Fire Department.

==== Clerk's lawsuit against city ====
In an effort to protect resident's right to privacy, Hagerty, the City Attorney, and City Council refused to grant the Clerk the right to view body worn police camera recordings of non-arrested subjects, nor review and determine what is attorney-client privileged information. Hagerty and the City insisted that by law the only people who could review body worn police camera recordings of non-arrested subjects are the police or the subject of the video (or his or her attorney) but not any other City or elected officials, including the Clerk or the Mayor. After the Council refused to acquiesce to his demands, the Clerk filed a lawsuit against the City asking the Court to decide in his favor. In August 2019, Clerk Reid withdrew his lawsuit claiming that the council's move to add additional FOIA Officers, including one from the Police Department, removed his standing.

==== Additional FOIA Officers ====
Due to the high volume of FOIA requests (from 700 to 1400 annually), Hagerty moved to add FOIA officers. This was met with outrage by Reid and his supporters who accused Hagerty of racism and trying to subvert the will of the people. On a 6–3 vote, with Alderman Fleming, Rue Simmons, and Rainey voting no, the City added four additional FOIA officers. Angry, and shouting "Shame on you!", Reid abruptly left the City Council meeting never to return that evening.

==== Clerk accused of harassment and intimidation ====
Three city employees filed unhealthy workplace complaints against City Clerk Devon Reid, alleging that he harassed and intimidated the city attorney, created an unhealthy work environment in the city clerk's office, and attempted to obstruct his deputy's attempt to join a labor union. Given that these allegations were made against an elected official, the city manager hired outside counsel to investigate, instead of the Department of Human Resources. The allegations were sustained by the independent counsel and Hagerty moved to have the City Council censure the city clerk. The clerk and his supporters accused Hagerty of racism, claimed the outside counsel was not independent, and insisted that details of the investigation be made public, including the employees who made these accusations. On a 5–4 vote, the motion to censure the city clerk was tabled and never revisited. Voting in favor of tabling the censure were Aldermen Braithwaite, Rue Simmons, Suffredin, Rainey, and Fleming.

==== Confidential, executive session report leaked to media ====
Soon after the vote to censure the city clerk, the highly confidential executive session report describing the details of his misconduct and the employees who filed the complaints, plus concerns of him recording conversations with others without their knowledge, including two aldermen, was released to the media. The mayor expressed outrage that someone on the council or in the city manager's office would violate laws established to protect the privacy of employees and the confidentiality of discussions in executive session.

==== Request for official misconduct investigation ====
Due to the arrest of the city clerk by the Evanston Police Department, Hagerty sent a confidential letter to the Cook County Sheriff Tom Dart asking him to conduct an investigation into the leak in order to restore the confidence of employees and the public in the city's ability to effectively manage its affairs. The same day, Hagerty notified the Council of his request. Less than eight business hours later, WGN reported on the mayor's request for an investigation. The city clerk subsequently conducted an interview with WGN referring to Hagerty's "Trumpian" ways in calling for an investigation of this leaked report. On August 2, 2019, Hagerty informed the community of his request and the importance of resetting standards and restoring trust.

==== Ethics charges ====
In 2020, Devon Reid, the city clerk, and Misty Witenberg, publisher of Evanston Leads, charged Hagerty with abuse of power and intimidation, claiming he initiated the outside investigation into Reid. The ethics board exonerated Hagerty and denounced Reid for his behavior during the five-hour ethics board hearing in which Reid shared with the public confidential human resource information that violated the privacy of city employees, according to the HR director.

==== Missing executive session meeting minutes ====
Hagerty was accused by Reid and his supporters of racism and badgering when he repeatedly inquired where approximately a dozen missing executive session recordings and meeting minutes were. After more than a year, Reid claimed that he had a recording malfunction and did not take any written notes so he could not produce the recording or minutes for the 12 executive session meetings.

==== #SilenceTheHag ====
After Jacob Blake, whose grandfather served as a prominent pastor in Evanston, by police in Waukegan, Illinois, Hagerty was invited to speak at a lament organized by faith leaders in Evanston. Soon after the lament, some residents voiced outrage that Hagerty was invited to speak, given his lack of prior support for Devon Reid. A petition was circulated calling on the faith and nonprofit communities to #silencethehag for three months because he had "no ethical standing" in the community.

==== Harley Clarke ====
After eight years of consideration and finding every solution unacceptable, the Council voted 5–4 vote to accept a $400K gift from the Evanston Lighthouse Dunes group and demolish the dilapidated Harley Clarke Mansion, turning the area into additional open lakefront space. Hagerty, who lives nearby, was attacked for this decision under the assertion that as a nearby neighbor he wanted more open space. Hagerty was on record for wanting to save the mansion and suggested that to do so successfully it ought to be leased long term to a private entity with the means to repair the mansion and offer a quasi-public benefit (e.g., a restaurant, banquet hall, inn, etc.). Upset by the council's decision, some residents initiated a referendum campaign to save the mansion. The advisory referendum asked, "Shall the City of Evanston protect from demolition and preserve the landmark Harley Clarke buildings and gardens next to Lighthouse Beach, for us and access as public property, consistent with the Evanston Lakefront Master Plan, at minimal or no cost to Evanston taxpayers?" 80% of residents responded yes. The Council took another vote after the referendum and voted 9–0 to reconsider other options besides demolition. The city ultimately signed a 40-year lease with the Artist Book House to renovate and operate the house.

==== Evanston Voter Initiative ====
After the Harley Clarke referendum prevailed, the organizers, along with former IllinoisGovernor Pat Quinn, advocated for the Evanston Voter Initiative, a referendum that would allow voters to place binding referendums on the ballot. Although the group had 3,800 signatures, Hagerty and Alderman Ann Rainey, two of three members of the local election board, voted to sustain objections filed against the referendum after a two-part four-hour election board meeting. The third member was City Clerk Devon Reid, who voted in favor of allowing the referendum to move onto the ballot. The Evanston Voter Initiative group subsequently challenged the decision in court and lost at every level, including the Illinois State Court of Appeals. The Illinois State Supreme Court elected not to hear the case, thereby allowing the appeals court ruling to stand. Hagerty was criticized by the group for suppressing the voice of the people. Hagerty contended he was supporting representative democracy, whereby our elected representatives make the decisions on our behalf.

==== #NUCommunityNotCops ====
During the Fall of 2020, Northwestern University students along with other activists demanded the abolition of the university's Public Safety Department. They held 30+ days of straight unannounced, pop-up protests, taking over intersections, marching downtown and through neighborhoods, and protesting in front the home of the university's president, Morton Shapiro's, as well as Hagerty's home. On Halloween night, approximately 300 protesters, dressed in black and carrying open umbrellas, marched through downtown Evanston. Some protesters extensively graffitied Northwestern's administration building, and damaged windows at Whole Foods and other properties downtown. One police officer was injured, and one protester was arrested. Hagerty issued a public letter to President Shapiro within 24 hours stating that both police and protesters deserve to do their jobs peacefully, and when that doesn't occur, arrests will be made.

==== Albion development ====
Soon after taking office, a Facebook group, Evanstonians for Responsible Planning, formed to oppose development supported by Hagerty and often the majority of the council. One development that outraged opponents was Albion Evanston, a 273-unit apartment building downtown along the Metra tracks. The project passed 5–4 with vocal opposition at the Council meeting. Ultimately, Albion Evanston was recognized as one of the three best residential developments in the country by National Association of Home Builders.

==== Rainey censure ====
At an election board meeting for the Harley Clarke Referendum in 2018, Lori Keenan, an unsuccessful 2021 Mayoral Candidate, moved to have Alderman Ann Rainey removed from the Election Board due to her support of the demolition of Harley Clarke to create additional open space. During the meeting, Rainey left the dais, confronted Kennan, cursed at her, and issued a threat. Kenan, and two other residents, filed an ethics complaint against Rainey, charging her with intimidation. The ethics board concurred and recommended to the Council that Rainey be prohibited to vote on any matters related to Harley Clarke. Hagerty disagreed strongly with this recommendation because it would disenfranchise residents in the eighth Ward, and therefore recommended censure of Rainey. On a 5–4 vote, with Rainey voting not to censure herself, the censure failed. Hagerty publicly inquired why the subject of the censure gets to vote on their own censure, and the City Attorney responded that the City Code says each Alderman is to determine whether they need to recuse themselves from a vote, and, if so, explain why.

==== City Manager selection ====
In the summer of 2019, City Manager Wally Bobkiewicz announced he was leaving to become the City Administrator in Issaquah, Washington. The City Council asked Assistant City Manager, Erika Storlie, to become the interim City Manager. In September 2019, the City staff suggested that the Council hire GovHR to lead the nationwide search. Alderman Suffredin and Fleming insisted that the Council interview the three finalist firms, thereby delaying the search five months. In February, on a 7–2 vote, with Fleming and Suffredin voting no, the Council engaged GovHR. Soon thereafter, the COVID-19 pandemic closed down Illinois and Evanston, and Hagerty declared a local state of emergency. On May 26, 2020, at the City Council meeting, Hagerty suggested that, given the pandemic and the excellent work of Erika Storlie, the Council consider disbanding the search, which had yet to really begin, and grant the permanent job to Storlie. The majority of the Council expressed interest in this path forward. However, prior to the next Council meeting, with protests over George Floyd's murder rising, opposition to Hagerty's recommendation mounted. On July 10, 2020, Erika Storlie requested that the City proceed with a national search. After completion of a national search, Erika Storlie was appointed the City Manager of Evanston in October 2020. The evening of her appointment some residents protested her selection. Hagerty described in an Op-Ed the disconnect between transparency and disagreement.

==== Colonoscopy ====
Wanting to bring attention to the importance of preventative care, especially during the pandemic, Hagerty chose to have a colonoscopy rather than attend the City Council meeting on December 14, 2020. Despite the advances in colonoscopy video technology, Mayor Hagerty's procedure was not streamed live on local television or Facebook Live.

==== Custer Street Fair, Cook County Mobile Command Center ====
Due to vehicle ramming attacks, the City of Evanston deployed the Cook County Emergency Command Vehicle as both a security command center and physical barrier to the Custer Street Arts Fair in Evanston. Four hours into the first day of the two-day street festival, protesters arrived at the fair and took to social media claiming that the vehicle was deployed by Homeland Security to round up undocumented immigrants. Hagerty issued a statement via the City claiming the vehicle was there to protect fairgoers and to serve as a command center should there be any public safety incidents. Four months later, Cook County changed the department's name from the Department of Homeland Security and Emergency Management to the Department of Emergency Management and Regional Security.

=== Completion of term ===
Hagerty announced in October 2020 that he would not seek re-election to another term in office. In his farewell address, Hagerty asked Evanstonians not to let falsehoods replace facts, the overly critical replace critical thinking, or division to replace unity.

Asked in his final state of the City address to reflect on his favorite moment as Mayor, Hagerty described the opportunity his 10-year-old son had to meet Joe Biden at Northwestern University, who gave him a command coin and a few dollars to buy an ice cream.

Hagerty endorsed Daniel Biss to replace him as Mayor. During the campaign, Biss accused a local PAC, Evanston Together, of using "dark money" to advocate for certain candidates who supported a City Manager form of government. It was revealed that Hagerty provided funds to the Evanston Together PAC and that the PAC may have violated campaign finance reporting requirements.
