= Hockomock League =

High school athletic league in Massachusetts

- Conference: Massachusetts Interscholastic Athletic Association
- Founded: 1932
- Division: MIAA Division I
- No. of teams: 12
- Region: New England
- Website: https://hockomocksports.com/

The Hockomock League is an interscholastic high school athletic league located in Southeastern Massachusetts, founded in 1932. The league took its name from a historic, freshwater swamp which served as a fortress for the Wampanoag native tribe during the King Philip’s War. The Wampanoags revered the area, naming it, “Hockomock,” an Algonquin word meaning, “Place where spirits dwell.” Today, the Hockomock Swamp is a protected environmental area and many local businesses, agencies and organizations use the Hockomock moniker to refer to their association with this region.

The league consists of 12 schools located in contiguous communities. All Hockomock League schools are public secondary schools and are members of the Massachusetts Interscholastic Athletic Association (MIAA). The director of the league rotates, with the athletic director of a different member school serving in the role each year.

For much of its existence, the League was made-up of nine schools but has twice undergone expansion adding a tenth school, Attleboro, in 2010, and then Taunton and Milford joined the League at the beginning of the 2012-2013 academic year. Enrollment disparities and the desire to balance the competitiveness of its sports programs, especially football, were major reasons to expand. With the addition of more teams, in 2010 the league implemented a divisional system. Schools with larger enrollments were placed in the Kelley-Rex Division, while smaller schools are in the Davenport Division. Realignment of the divisions occurs every two years at a meeting of the school principals and athletic directors where each school reports their respective Department of Elementary and Secondary Education enrollment numbers for grades nine through eleven. Each division has six teams. Under the division format, both the Kelley-Rex and Davenport winners are considered Hockomock League champions.

In July 2019 the Hockomock League published a new logo embodying what it calls “the key components of the League’s long historical tradition and modern core values,” according to a press release.

The division names give tribute to three long-time Hockomock League administrators: Bill Rex, Foxborough High School; Louis Kelley, North Attleboro High School; and Dudley Davenport, Sharon High School.

Since its inception, the league has earned a reputation for its competitiveness in all sports and its member schools have produced numerous sectional and state champions. It is regarded as one of the premier high school sports leagues in Massachusetts and the New England region.

== Member schools ==
Hockomock League
Locations of Hockomock League members, 2021-2022 Kelley-Rex (large school) division member Davenport (small school) division member, and the Hockomock Swamp

High School	Location	Colors	Mascot	Enrollment	Division
Attleboro	Attleboro, MA	Blue & Silver	Blue Bombardiers	1,993	Kelley-Rex
Canton	Canton, MA	Green & White	Bulldogs	971	Davenport
Foxborough	Foxborough, MA	Navy Blue, Gold & White	Warriors	704	Davenport
Franklin	Franklin, MA	Navy Blue, Sky Blue & White	Panthers	1,379	Kelley-Rex
King Philip	Wrentham, MA	Green & Gold	Warriors	1,100	Davenport
Mansfield	Mansfield, MA	Green, Black & White	Hornets	957	Davenport
Milford	Milford, MA	Red & White	Scarlet Hawks	1,249	Kelley-Rex
North Attleborough	North Attleborough, MA	Red & White	Rocketeers	986	Davenport
Sharon	Sharon, MA	Maroon & Gold	Eagles	1,129	Kelley-Rex
Oliver Ames	Easton, MA	Orange & Black	Tigers	988	Davenport
Stoughton	Stoughton, MA	Black & Orange	Black Knights	1,028	Kelley-Rex
Taunton	Taunton, MA	Black & Orange	Tigers	2,850	Kelley-Rex

Note: Enrollment figures (2025-2026) are for grades nine through eleven and are used for determining a school's divisional alignment.

A new alignment for the Hockomock Divisions was most recently established in 2026.

== Hall of Fame Coaches ==
The following Hockomock League coaches have distinguished themselves in their coaching profession and have been inducted into one or more of the following Coaches Hall of Fame for their sport(s). Organizations include Massachusetts Basketball Coaches Assn. (MBCA), Massachusetts High School Football Coaches Assn. (MHSFCA), Massachusetts Baseball Coaches Assn. (MassBCA), Eastern Massachusetts Soccer Coaches Assn (EMSCA)., Massachusetts State Track Coaches Assn. (MSTCA)

=== Attleborough HS ===
- Howard Tozier, Attleboro, basketball. Inducted in 1969.
- James Cassidy, Attleboro, football. Inducted in 1978.
- Steve Newman, Attleboro, track. Inducted in 1998.

=== Canton HS ===
- Bill Donovan, Canton, football. Inducted in 1965.
- Danny Erickson, Canton, soccer. Inducted in 2013.
- Robert C. Gibson, Canton, baseball. Inducted in 1978.
- George King, Canton, track. Inducted in 2000.
- Charlie Stevenson, Canton, football. Inducted in 2004.
- Paul F. Therrien, Canton, football. Inducted in 1993.

=== Foxborough HS ===
- William Rex, Foxboro, football. Inducted in 2001.
- Tom Sullivan, Foxboro, football. Inducted in 1994.
- Greg McManus, Foxboro, soccer. Inducted in 2003.
- Jack Martinelli, Foxboro, football. Inducted in 2011.
- Kevin Murphy, Foxboro, track. Inducted in 2006.

=== Franklin HS ===
- Ronald Bonollo, Franklin, baseball. Inducted in 1986.
- Fran Bositis, Franklin, soccer, Inducted in 2003.
- Don Delloroco, Franklin, football. Inducted in 2009.
- Gerard Leone, Franklin, football. Inducted in 1991.
- Nello Luccini, Franklin, baseball. Inducted in 1999.
- Pete Pasquarosa, Franklin, baseball. Inducted in 2013.
- Paul Trovoto, Franklin, track. Inducted in 2009.
- Lou Verocchi, Franklin, Lacrosse. Inducted in 2024.

=== King Philip Regional HS ===
- Gary Lombard, King Philip, baseball. Inducted in 1997.

=== Mansfield HS ===
- Julie Collins, Mansfield, track, Inducted in 2013.
- Mike Redding, Mansfield, football. Inducted in 2019.

=== Milford HS ===
- Charles Espanet, Milford, baseball. Inducted in 1972.
- Charlie Stand, Milford, baseball. Inducted in 2006.

=== North Attleborough HS ===
- Ray Beaupre, North Attleboro, football. Inducted in 2000.
- Dwight Estey, North Attleboro, track. Inducted in 2009.

=== Oliver Ames HS ===
- Elaine Clement-Holbrook, Oliver Ames, basketball. Inducted in 2008.
- Leo Duggan, Oliver Ames, baseball. Inducted in 2012.
- James Mitchell, Oliver Ames, football. Inducted in 2001.
- Valentine P. Muscato, Oliver Ames, football, basketball and track. Inducted in 1979, 1976 and 1992, respectively.
- William Nixon, Oliver Ames, basketball. Inducted in 2001.

=== Sharon HS ===
- Dudley Davenport, Sharon, basketball. Inducted in 1989
- Alan Howie, Sharon, soccer. Inducted in 2010.
- Joel Peckman, Sharon, baseball. Inducted in 2012

=== Stoughton HS ===
- Robert Ashley, Stoughton, baseball. Inducted in 2001
- Greg Burke, Stoughton, football. Inducted in 2019
- Albert Toomey, Stoughton, football. Inducted in 1976

== Notable Hockomock Athletes ==
The following athletes went on to have a significant collegiate or professional career:

- Jim Craig - Oliver Ames (Hockey). Goalie on the 1980 US Olympic Hockey Team. Won a gold medal. Played hockey for Boston University and professionally in the NHL for the Atlanta Flames, Boston Bruins and the Minnesota North Stars.
- Anthony Sherman - North Attleboro (Football). Was the team captain in football, track and baseball. Played football for the University of Connecticut. Ten-year professional football career in the NFL with the Arizona Cardinals and the Kansas City Chiefs.
- Peter Laviolette - Franklin (Hockey). Played hockey and baseball for Franklin. Played 12 NHL games for the New York Rangers. He has been a head coach in every NHL season since the 2001-02 NHL season. He has coached the New York Islanders, Carolina Hurricanes, Philadelphia Flyers, Nashville Predators, and is currently coaching the Washington Capitols.
- Tom Nalen - Foxboro (Football). Played football at Boston College. Drafted by the Denver Broncos in 1994 Has 2 Super Bowl rings and went to the pro bowl 5 times. 2 times 1st team all pro in 2000 and 2003.
- Sarah Behn - Foxboro (girls basketball). She was the head women's basketball coach at Framingham State, Franklin Pierce, and Brown University. She returned to coach girls' basketball at Foxboro briefly, from 2004-2011.
- Lofa Tatupu - King Philip (football). All state football player, played college football at Maine and then transferred to USC. Three time Pro Bowl linebacker for the Seattle Seahawks.
- Kevin Pyne - Milford (Football - Boston College)
- Kerry Taylor - Mansfield (Football - UMass, NFL)
- TJ Guy - Mansfield (Football - University of Michigan, NFL). Played football at the University of Michigan, winning three consecutive Big Ten Championships along with a National Championship. Guy continued his football career with the Baltimore Ravens.
- Frederick Richard - Stoughton (Gymnastics). Secured a team bronze medal at Paris 2024 Olympic Games.
