= Elizabeth Tisdahl =

American mayor

20th Mayor of Evanston, Illinois
- In office May 11, 2009 – May 8, 2017
- Preceded by: Lorraine Morton
- Succeeded by: Steve Hagerty

Personal details
- Born: April 27, 1946 (age 79)
- Party: Democratic

Elizabeth B. Tisdahl (born April 27, 1946) is the former mayor of Evanston, Illinois. She was Evanston's third female mayor and second Democratic mayor.

== Background ==
Tisdahl has held many civic posts throughout her almost four decades of living in Evanston. She helped to found the Mothers Against Gangs School Liaison in 1987 and served on the Evanston Community Foundation Advisory Committee from 1987 to 1995. She spent twelve years on the Evanston Township High School Board of Education beginning in 1989, serving two of those years as the President of that organization. She then became the alderman of Evanston's 7th Ward, an Evanston City Council position she held from 2003 until her election as mayor in 2009.

She attended Bryn Mawr College but did not graduate, according to a 2008 interview. She worked as an investment analyst.

She and her family live in Evanston. She has five grandchildren; two are living in Evanston, both of whom attended Evanston Public Schools.

== Awards and honors ==
Tisdahl has been recognized by the US Conference of Mayors for her environmental work and concern about sustainability. She also won the Democratic Party of Evanston Community Service Award in 2002.

Among Mayor Tisdahl's local honors are the Park School Certificate of Recognition (1992), the Fleetwood Jourdain Community Center Salute to Women in Human Services Appreciation Award (1999), and the Chessmen Club Community Service Award (2002).

== Campaign for mayor ==
Tisdahl's 2009 mayoral campaign was based on three major platforms "Diversity, Sustainability, and Economic Development", which have remained her top priorities while in office. She won in a four-candidate election.

== Administration ==
Since she became mayor, Tisdahl has simultaneously come under criticism and received praise for cracking down on alcohol consumption while loosening the penalties for drug use within Evanston city limits. Her decision to close The Keg of Evanston, a bar popular with the Northwestern University student population, drew the ire of many students and worsened town-gown tensions in Evanston.

She has faced further criticism from the Northwestern community for the proposed enforcement of a city ordinance called variously the "three-unrelated rule" and the "brothel law." The over-occupancy ordinance "prohibits more than three unrelated people from living together in a residential unit," affecting students who are usually unrelated to one another while leaving residential families untouched.

In her time as mayor, Tisdahl has also initiated a series of anti-crime (specifically anti-gang) programs like a gun buyback initiative in an attempt to curb rising rates of violent crime.

Tisdahl announced in 2016 that she would not seek a third term as mayor, and in 2017 endorsed businessman Steve Hagerty to succeed her. Hagerty, who was also endorsed by Tisdahl's predecessor Lorraine H. Morton, narrowly won the general election and replaced Tisdahl as mayor on May 8.
