= Attleboro, Massachusetts =

- City
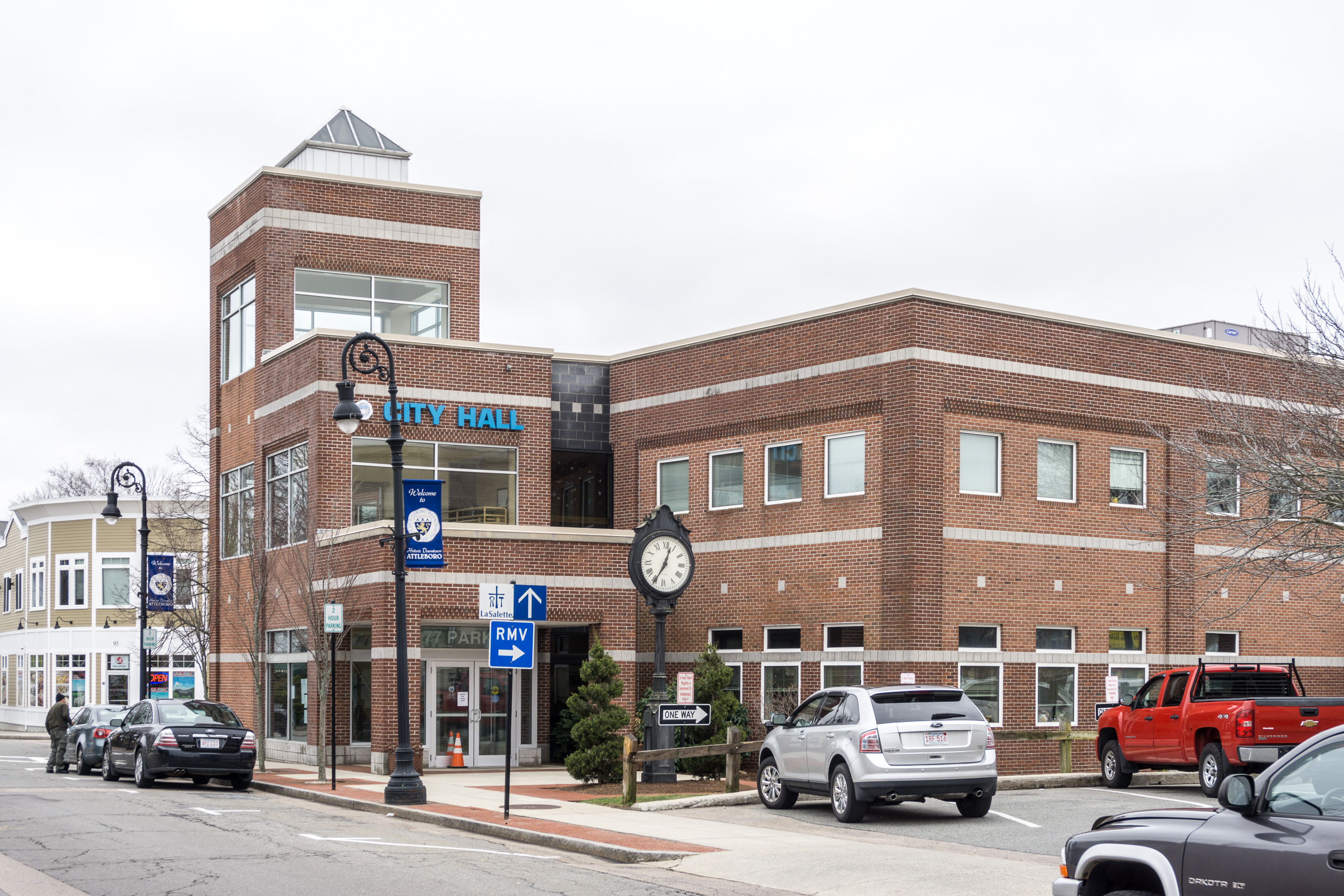
- Attleboro's city hall

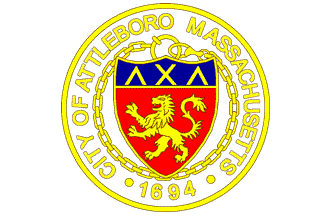
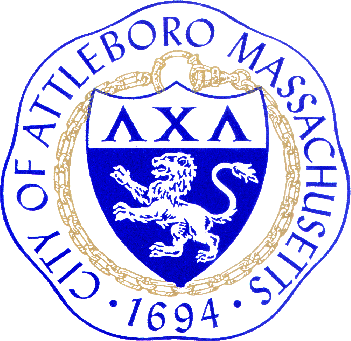
- Flag Seal
- Nicknames: The Jewelry City, A-Town
- Motto: Go Big Blue
- Location in Bristol County in Massachusetts

- Location in Massachusetts Attleboro (the United States) Attleboro (North America)
- Coordinates: 41.931653°N 71.294503°W
- Country: United States
- State: Massachusetts
- County: Bristol
- Settled: 1634
- Incorporated: 1694 (town)
- Reincorporated: 1914 (city)
- Named for: Attleborough, England

Government
  - Type: Mayor-council city
  - Mayor: Cathleen DeSimone

Area
  - Total: 27.77 sq mi (71.93 km^{2})
  - Land: 26.78 sq mi (69.36 km^{2})
  - Water: 0.99 sq mi (2.57 km^{2})
- Elevation: 138 ft (42 m)

Population (2020)
  - Total: 46,461
  - Density: 1,735.0/sq mi (669.87/km^{2})
- Time zone: UTC-5:00 (EST)
  - Summer (DST): UTC-4:00 (EDT)
- ZIP code: 02703
- Area code: 508 / 774
- FIPS code: 25-02690
- GNIS feature ID: 0612033
- Website: www.cityofattleboro.us

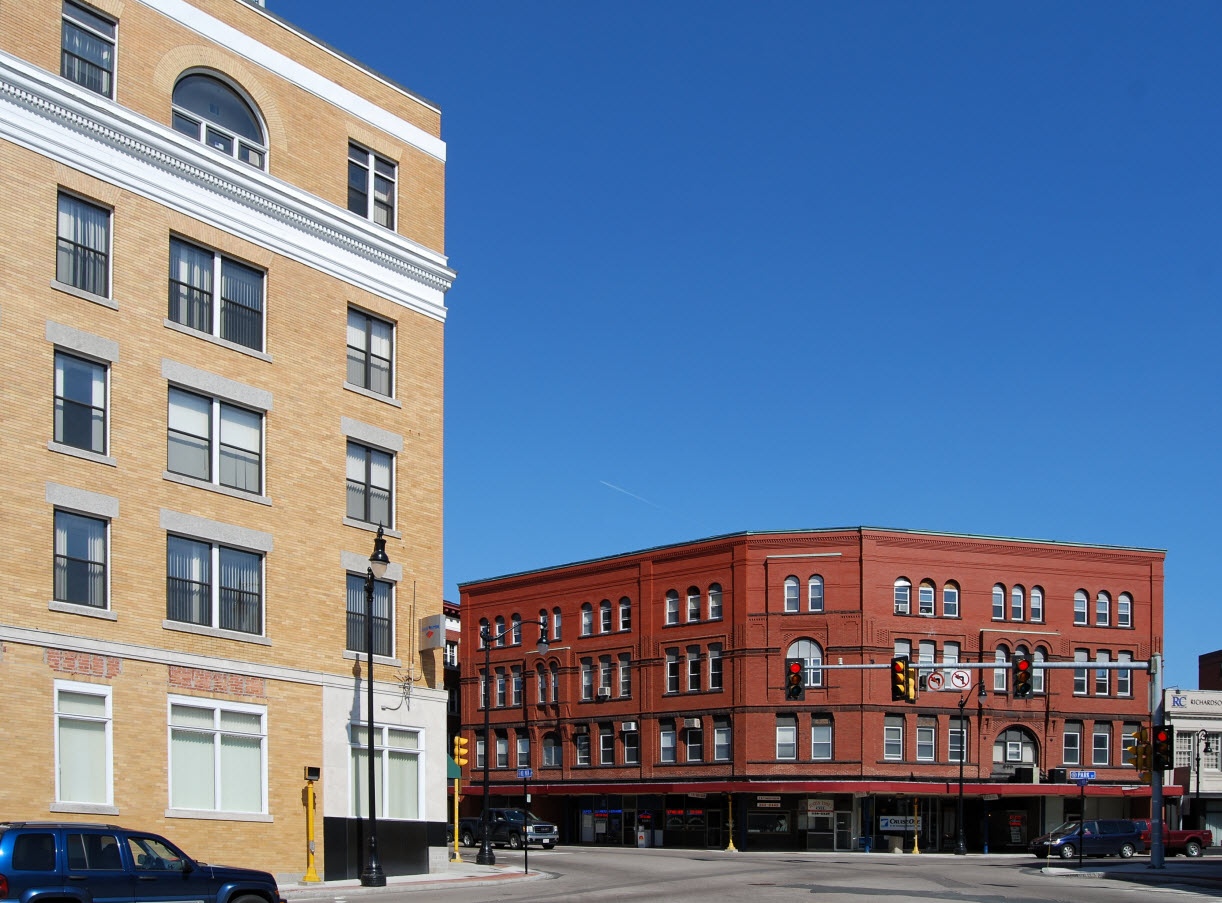
Downtown Attleboro

Attleboro is a city in Bristol County, Massachusetts, United States. It was once known as "The Jewelry Capital of the World" for its many jewelry manufacturers. According to the 2020 census, Attleboro had a population of 46,461, its highest decennial count ever.

Attleboro is the fourth most populous municipality, but the least populous city, in Bristol County, behind New Bedford, Fall River, and Taunton.

== History ==
In 1634, English settlers first arrived in the territory that is now Attleboro. The deed that granted them the land was written by Native American Wamsutta. The land. It included the towns of Cumberland, Rhode Island, until 1747 and North Attleborough, Massachusetts, until 1887. In 1643, Attleboro was part of the adjacent town of Rehoboth until it was separately incorporated as a town in 1694. In 1697 in response to an unwanted amount of disturbances, mainly from nearby tribes of natives, the town had a meeting and ended up deciding that selectmen would keep tabs on strangers and foreigners as well as banning certain ones from entering the town. The town was reincorporated in 1914 as the City of Attleboro, with the "-ugh" removed from the name, although North Attleborough kept it. In the 1600's many of the people who settled in this area were from Attleborough, England, after which the city is named.

During the Native American insurgency in the colonial era, Nathaniel Woodcock, the son of an Attleborough resident, was murdered, and his head was placed on a pole in his father's front yard. His father's house is now a historical site. It is rumored that George Washington once passed through Attleborough and stayed near the Woodcock Garrison House at the Hatch Tavern, where he exchanged a shoe buckle with Israel Hatch, a revolutionary soldier and the new owner of the Garrison House.

The city became known for jewelry manufacturing in 1913, particularly because of the L.G. Balfour Company. That company has since moved out of the city, and the site of the former plant has been converted into a riverfront park. Attleboro was once known as "The Jewelry Capital of the World", and jewelry manufacturing firms continue to operate there. One such is the Guyot Brothers Company, which was started in 1904. General Findings, M.S. Company, James A. Murphy Co., Garlan Chain, Leach & Garner, and Masters of Design are jewelry manufacturing companies still in operation.

=== Cancer cluster ===
In late 2003, The Sun Chronicle reported that a state investigation had been launched into the deaths of three women in the city from glioblastoma. In 2007, the State of Massachusetts issued a report concluding that although the diagnosis rate for brain and central nervous system (CNS) cancers was higher than expected when compared to statewide data, the increase was determined not to be statistically significant.

Scorecard, Environmental Defense's online database of polluters, lists seven facilities contributing to cancer hazards in Attleboro, including Engineered Materials Solutions Inc., the worst offender in Massachusetts.

==== Shpack Landfill contamination incident ====
In 2002, the Massachusetts Public Health Department was asked to evaluate the former Shpack Landfill, on the border of Norton and Attleboro, for its cancer risks. The investigation continued at least through 2004. The informal landfill included uranium fuel rods, heavy metals, and volatile organic compounds.

== Geography ==
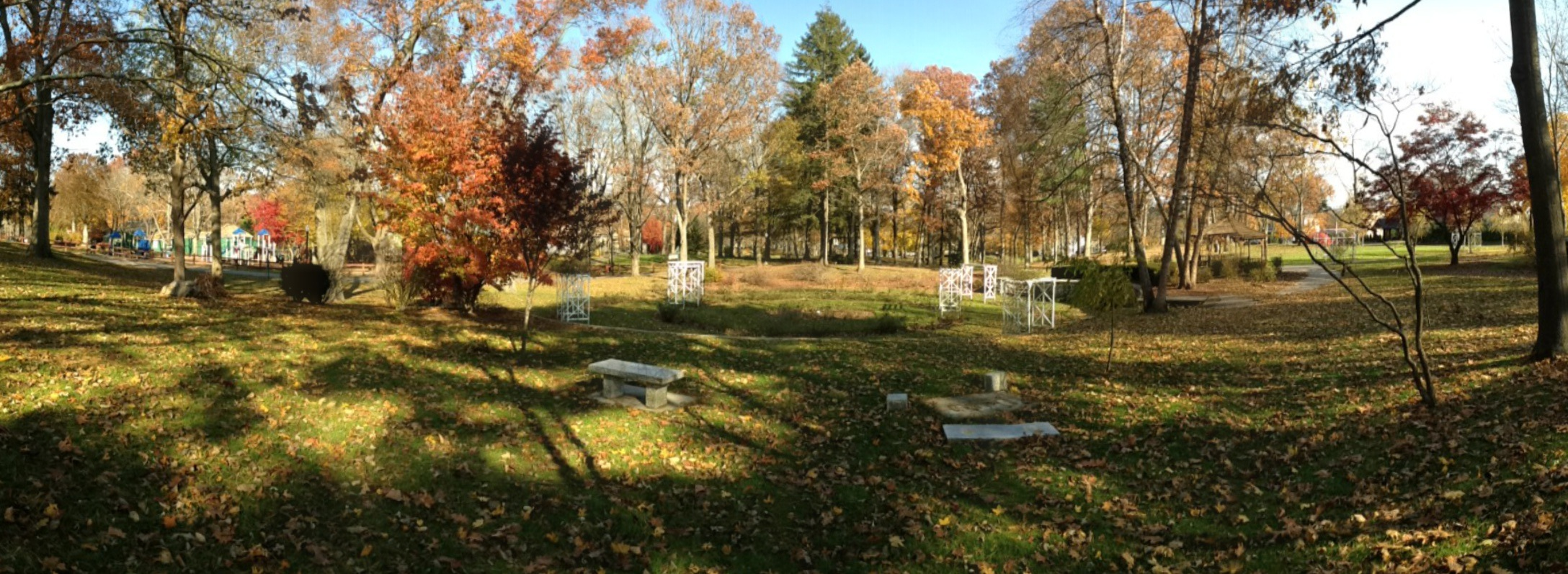
Capron Park

Attleboro has an area of 27.772 square miles (71.930 km^{2}), of which 26.779 square miles (69.356 km^{2}) is land and 0.994 square miles (2.574 km^{2}), or 3.59%, is water. Its borders form an irregular polygon that resembles a truncated triangle pointing west. It is bordered by North Attleborough to the north, Mansfield and Norton to the east, Rehoboth, Seekonk, and Pawtucket, Rhode Island, to the south, and Cumberland, Rhode Island, to the west, as well as sharing a short border with Central Falls, Rhode Island through the Blackstone River. It includes the areas known as City Center, Briggs Corner, West Attleboro, East Corner, East Attleboro, North Corner, Maple Square, Camp Hebron, Oak Hill, Dodgeville, East Junction, Hebronville, Park Square, and South Attleboro.

Waterways in the city include the Ten Mile River, fed by the Bungay River, the Manchester Pond Reservoir, and several small ponds.

Attleboro's highest point is 249-foot (76 m) Oak Hill, in the southern part of the city, north of Oak Hill Avenue.

Attleboro is on the border between the Massachusetts and Rhode Island regional dialects of New England English: the eastern part of the city is in the same dialect region as Boston, and the western part in the same dialect region as Providence.

== Demographics ==
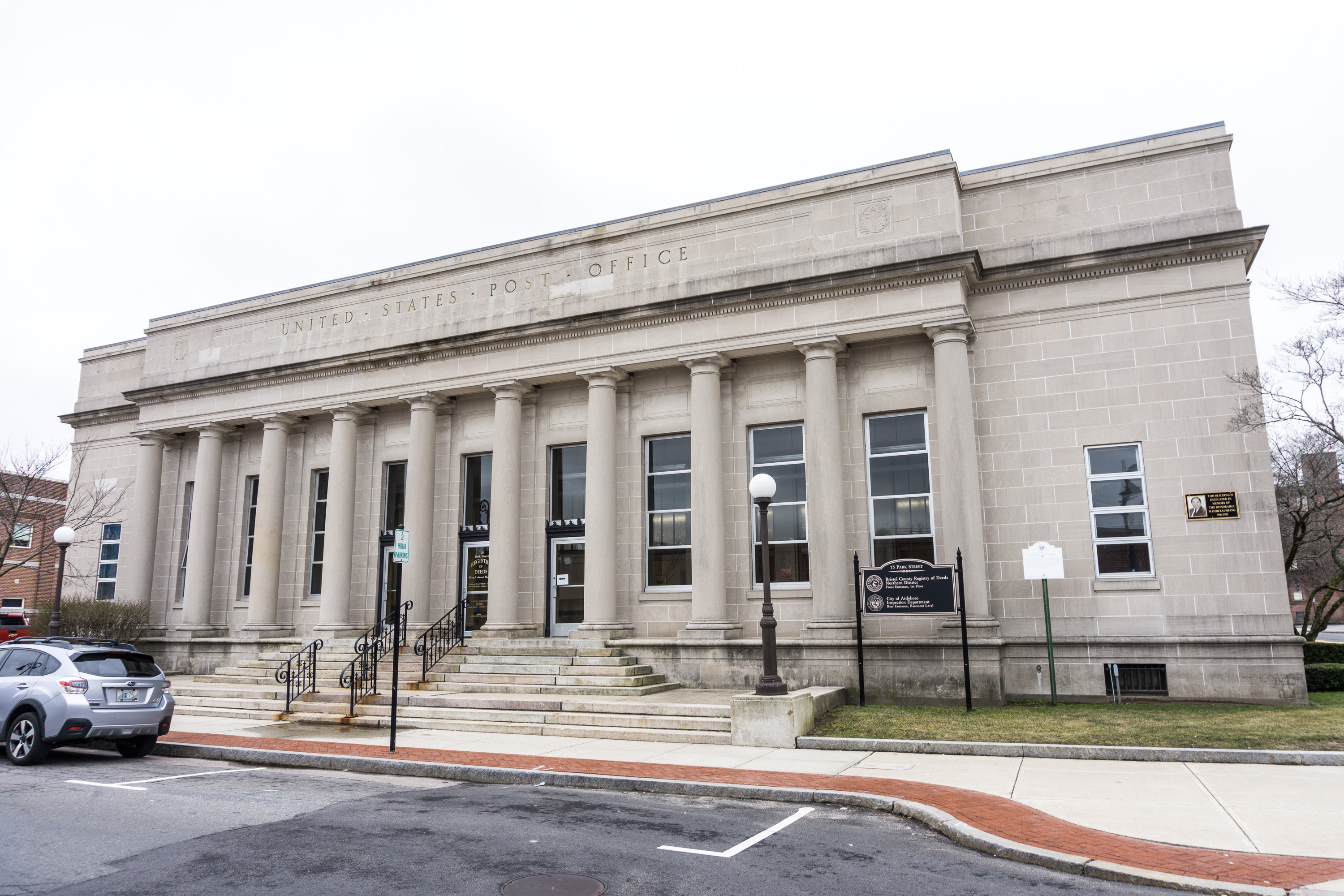
Attleboro Post Office

Historical population
Year	Pop.	±%
1790	2,166	—
1800	2,480	+14.5%
1810	2,716	+9.5%
1820	3,055	+12.5%
1830	3,215	+5.2%
1840	3,585	+11.5%
1850	4,200	+17.2%
1860	6,066	+44.4%
1870	6,769	+11.6%
1880	11,111	+64.1%
1890	7,577	−31.8%
1900	11,335	+49.6%
1910	16,215	+43.1%
1920	19,731	+21.7%
1930	21,769	+10.3%
1940	22,071	+1.4%
1950	23,809	+7.9%
1960	27,118	+13.9%
1970	32,907	+21.3%
1980	34,196	+3.9%
1990	38,383	+12.2%
2000	42,068	+9.6%
2010	43,593	+3.6%
2020	46,461	+6.6%
2025*	47,447	+2.1%
* = population estimate. Source: United States census records and Population Estimates Program data. Source: U.S. Decennial Census

Attleboro is part of the Providence metropolitan area. It is a short distance from Boston, and is linked to the Boston metropolitan area.

=== 2020 census ===
As of the 2020 census, Attleboro had a population of 46,461. The median age was 41.7 years. 20.1% of residents were under the age of 18 and 16.3% of residents were 65 years of age or older. For every 100 females there were 96.1 males, and for every 100 females age 18 and over there were 94.2 males age 18 and over.

100.0% of residents lived in urban areas, while 0.0% lived in rural areas.

There were 18,256 households in Attleboro, of which 29.6% had children under the age of 18 living in them. Of all households, 47.3% were married-couple households, 18.6% were households with a male householder and no spouse or partner present, and 26.4% were households with a female householder and no spouse or partner present. About 27.8% of all households were made up of individuals and 11.4% had someone living alone who was 65 years of age or older.

There were 19,097 housing units, of which 4.4% were vacant. The homeowner vacancy rate was 0.7% and the rental vacancy rate was 4.4%.

Racial composition as of the 2020 census
Race	Number	Percent
White	35,842	77.1%
Black or African American	2,704	5.8%
American Indian and Alaska Native	160	0.3%
Asian	2,196	4.7%
Native Hawaiian and Other Pacific Islander	14	0.0%
Some other race	2,100	4.5%
Two or more races	3,445	7.4%
Hispanic or Latino (of any race)	4,140	8.9%

=== 2010 census ===
As of the 2010 census, there were 46,461 people and 17,781 households in the city; the population density was 1,735.0 inhabitants per square mile (669.9/km^{2}). There were 19,097 housing units in the city. The racial makeup of the city was 77.14% White, 5.82% African American, 0.34% Native American, 4.73% Asian, 0.03% Pacific Islander, 4.52% some other race, and 7.41% from two or more races. Hispanic and Latino people of any race made up 8.91% of the total population.

Of the 17,781 households, 33.1% had someone under the age of 18 living with them, 45.5% were married couples living together, 26.5% had a female householder with no spouse present, 17.3% had a male householder with no spouse present, 12.1% were individuals, and 5.4% were people aged 65 or older living alone. The average size of household was 2.58 and the average family size was 3.12.

The age distribution in the city was: 23.1% under 18, 7.0% from 18 to 24, 28.1% from 25 to 44, 26.4% from 45 to 64, and 15.5% 65 or older. The median age was 39.4 years.

The estimated median annual income for a household in the city was $93,266, and the median income for a family was $106,104. Per capita income was $42,224. About 9.2% of the population was below the poverty line, including 11.5% of those under 18 and 9.3% of those aged 65 or over.

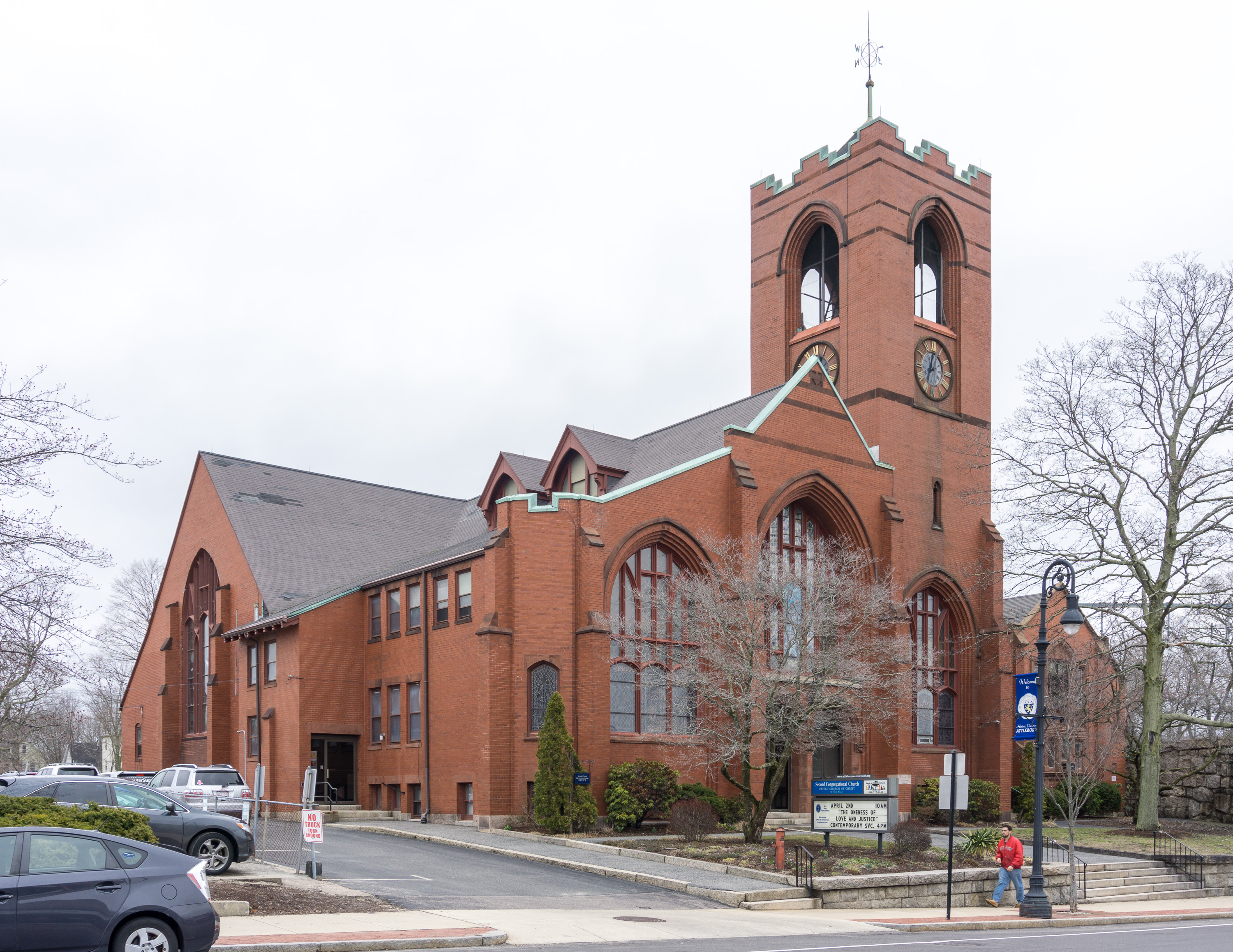
Second Congregational Church

== Economy ==
=== Revitalization efforts ===
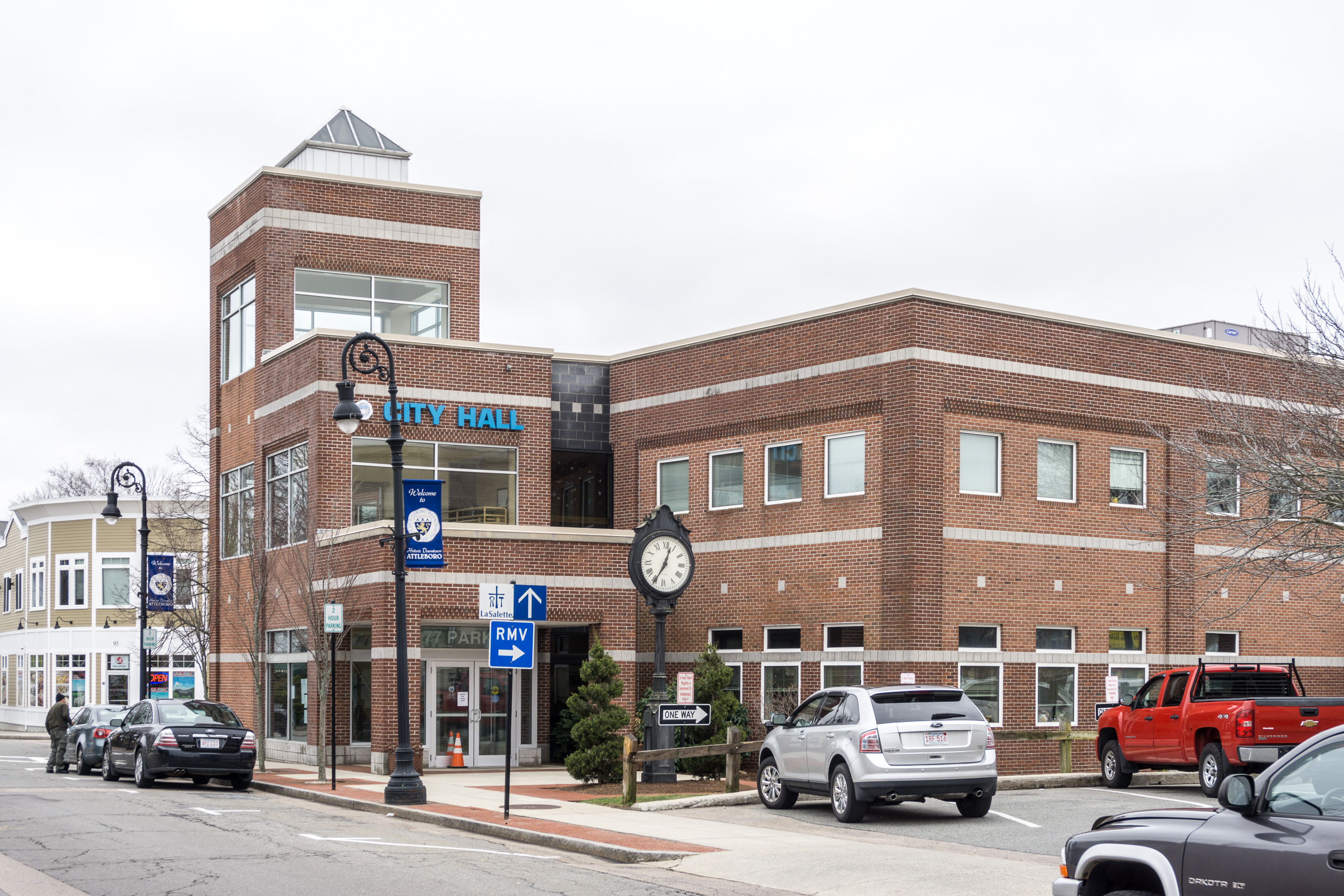
Attleboro City Hall

In 2011, Attleboro was awarded $5.4 million in state and federal funding to support revitalization efforts in its historic downtown area. The funds were intended to transform underutilized industrial and commercial parcels into areas of mixed use that included commercial, recreational, and residential space, as well as improvements to MBTA rail and GATRA bus services, and road improvements.

== Arts and culture ==
=== Attractions ===
Attleboro has four museums.

- The Attleboro Arts Museum
- The Attleboro Area Industrial Museum,
- The Women at Work Museum
- The Museum at the Mill.

Other places of interest in the city include:

- Capron Park Zoo;
- L.G. Balfour Riverwalk, which was once the site of the L.G. Balfour jewelry plant, adjacent to the downtown business district
- La Salette Shrine, which has a display of Christmas lights, as well as one of the largest museums of Nativity scenes in North America
- Oak Knoll Wildlife Sanctuary, 75 acres owned by the Massachusetts Audubon Society with a visitor center
- Triboro Youth Theatre / Triboro Musical Theatre;
- Attleboro Community Theatre; *Dodgeville Mill.
- Skyroc Brewery
- Attleboro Farmers Market

In 2017, Attleboro began hosting the annual Jewelry City Steampunk Festival.

=== The National Shrine of Our Lady of La Salette ===
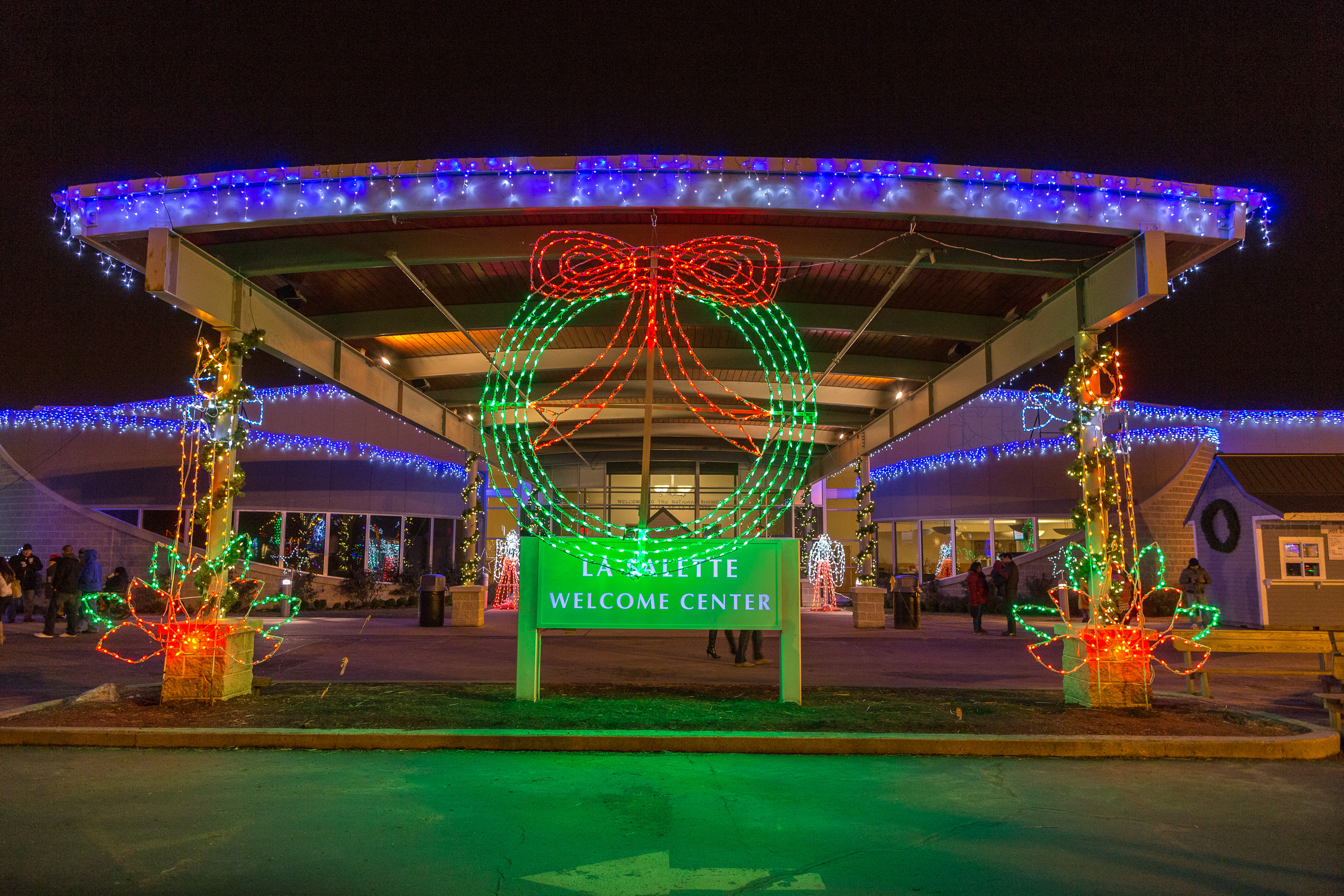
La Salette Shrine is a local tourist destination for its holiday light displays.

In 1942, the Missionaries of La Salette purchased 135 acres (0.55 km^{2}) and a castle in Attleboro for use as a seminary. The shrine opened to the public in 1953 with a Christmas manger display. The annual Christmas Festival of Lights has grown to 300,000 lights and attracts about 250,000 visitors each year. A devastating fire destroyed the castle on November 5, 1999. A new welcome center opened in 2007 which includes a 600-seat concert hall. In addition to the Christmas Festival, the shrine offers programs, concerts, workshops and events throughout the year. The grounds also include Our Lady's Chapel of Lights, an outdoor chapel, and a church.

== Parks and recreation ==
There are over 20 conservation areas amounting to more than 600 acres of walkable woods: the Antony Lawrence Preserve, Coleman Reservation, Attleboro Springs, and the Bungay River Conservation Area in the north of the city.

== Government ==
=== Municipal ===
Attleboro has a mayor-council government. The city council acts as the legislative body, and the mayor handles traditional day-to-day chief executive functions. City councilors can run as either a representative of a city ward or at large. There are 11 councilors: five at-large and six ward councilors. The mayor is former City Councilor At-Large Cathleen DeSimone. Kate Jackson serves as clerk of the Municipal Council.

=== State and federal ===
Attleboro is represented in the state legislature by officials elected from the following districts:

- Massachusetts Senate's Bristol and Norfolk district
- Massachusetts House of Representatives' 2nd Bristol district
- Massachusetts House of Representatives' 14th Bristol district

Elected members:

- Massachusetts House of Representatives: Adam Scanlon (D) and Jim Hawkins (D)
- Massachusetts Senate: Paul Feeney (D)
- United States House of Representatives: Jake Auchincloss (D-MA-04)
- United States Senate: Elizabeth Warren (D) and Ed Markey (D)

Attleboro is relatively liberal. The last Republican to win the city in a Presidential election was George H. W. Bush in 1988.

Attleboro presidential election results
Year	Democratic	Republican	Third parties	Total Votes	Margin
2024	54.65% 12,675	43.14% 10,007	2.21% 513	23,195	11.51%
2020	58.00% 13,661	39.36% 9,272	2.64% 622	23,555	18.63%
2016	51.45% 10,518	41.93% 8,571	6.62% 1,353	20,442	9.52%
2012	54.18% 10,502	43.70% 8,470	2.13% 412	19,384	10.48%
2008	55.33% 10,523	42.08% 8,003	2.59% 492	19,018	13.25%
2004	55.25% 9,857	43.24% 7,714	1.52% 271	17,842	12.01%
2000	56.95% 8,924	36.24% 5,679	6.81% 1,067	15,670	20.71%
1996	55.92% 7,956	29.93% 4,258	14.16% 2,014	14,228	25.99%
1992	38.81% 5,831	31.81% 4,779	29.37% 4,413	15,023	7.00%
1988	44.01% 6,199	54.94% 7,739	1.06% 149	14,087	10.93%
1984	35.82% 4,524	63.66% 8,041	0.52% 66	12,631	27.84%
1980	35.08% 4,376	47.29% 5,899	17.62% 2,198	12,473	12.21%
1976	49.05% 6,073	47.68% 5,903	3.27% 405	12,381	1.37%
1972	45.73% 5,934	53.69% 6,968	0.58% 75	12,977	7.97%
1968	56.19% 6,924	39.44% 4,860	4.37% 539	12,323	16.75%
1964	72.04% 8,744	27.64% 3,355	0.31% 38	12,137	44.40%
1960	50.80% 6,402	49.08% 6,186	0.12% 15	12,603	1.71%
1956	28.45% 3,270	71.37% 8,204	0.18% 21	11,495	42.92%
1952	35.88% 4,265	63.88% 7,593	0.24% 28	11,886	28.00%
1948	45.50% 4,824	53.45% 5,667	1.05% 111	10,602	7.95%
1944	44.90% 4,412	54.91% 5,396	0.19% 19	9,827	10.01%
1940	45.96% 4,784	53.54% 5,574	0.50% 52	10,410	7.59%

== Education ==
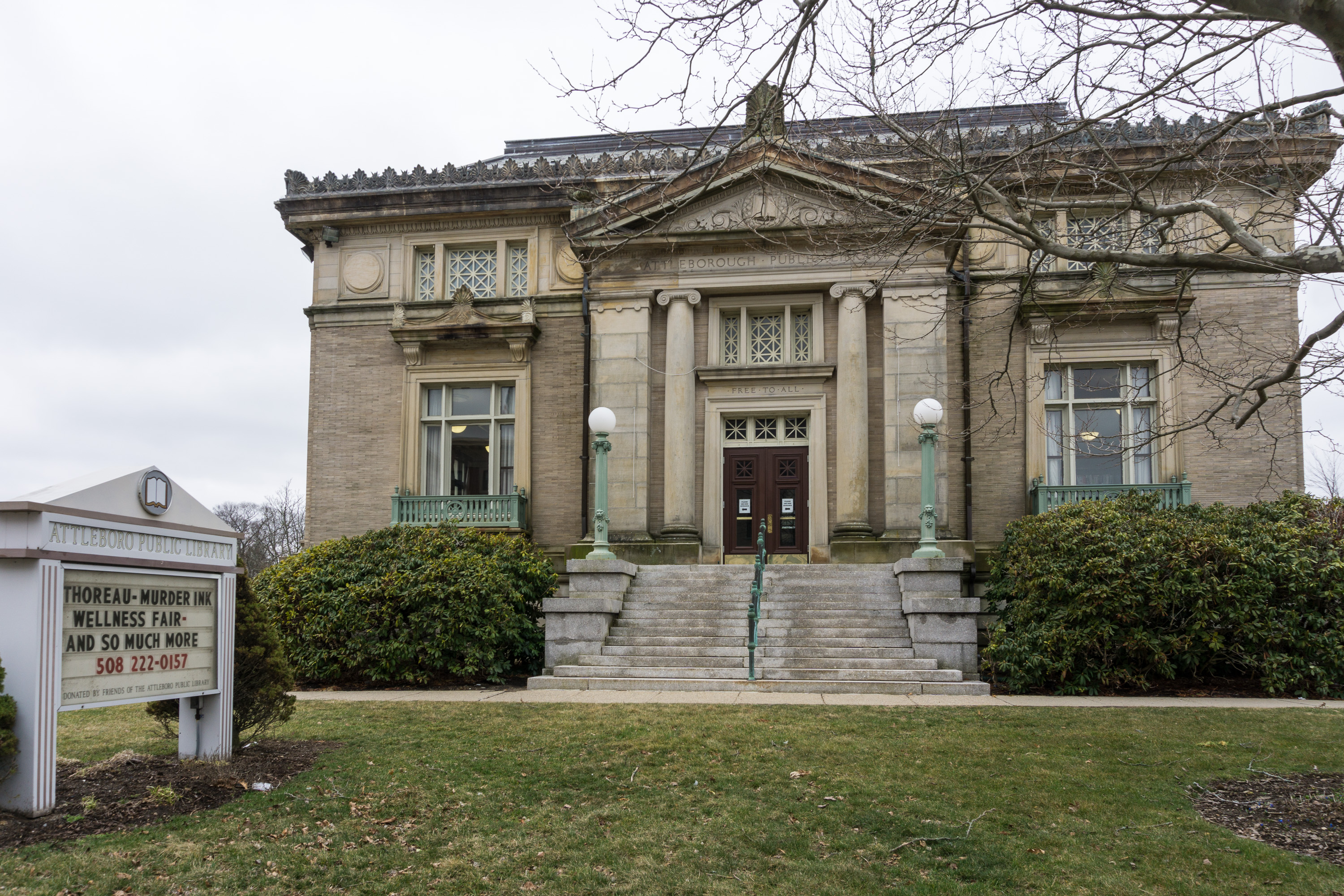
Attleboro Public Library

Attleboro's school district, Attleboro Public Schools, has five elementary schools (Hill-Roberts, Hyman Fine, A. Irvin Studley, Peter Thacher and Thomas Willett), three middle schools (Brennan, Coelho and Wamsutta), and two high schools (Attleboro High School, and Attleboro Community Academy). Attleboro High School has its own vocational division, and its football team (the "Blue Bombardiers") has a traditional rivalry with North Attleborough High School, whom they play in their Thanksgiving Day football game. Attleboro Community Academy is a night school for students aged 16–25 to obtain their high school diplomas and could not function in traditional high school. Bishop Feehan High School is a co-educational Roman Catholic high school that opened in 1961 and is named for Bishop Daniel Francis Feehan, second Bishop of the Diocese of Fall River. The city also has a satellite branch of Bristol Community College, formerly housed in the city's former high school building but since relocated to an old Texas Instruments site. Bridgewater State University opened a satellite site in Attleboro in 2009, sharing space with Bristol Community College.

=== Attleboro High School ===
The former high school building was built in the 1960s, and added wings in several renovations throughout the years. The city of Attleboro voted on whether to build a new school or renovate the building, and "reached an agreement to put proceeds from the sale toward the cost of a new high school before the $260 million was approved by voters last spring." The sale of the first Attleboro High School built in 1912 on County Street gave the city funds for the new building. The new Attleboro High School opened in 2022.

== Infrastructure ==
=== Transportation ===
Attleboro is beside Interstate 95 (which enters the state between Attleboro and Pawtucket, Rhode Island), I-295 (whose northern terminus is near the North Attleborough town line at I-95), US Route 1, and Routes 1A, 118, 123 and 152, the last three of which intersect at Attleboro center. The proposed Interstate 895 was to run through Attleboro and have a junction at the present day I-295/I-95 terminus. When driving from Rhode Island on I-295, the stub exits before the half-cloverleaf exit to I-95.

The city is home to two MBTA commuter rail stations: one in the downtown area and one in the South Attleboro district, near the Rhode Island border. Attleboro and Taunton are both served by the Greater Attleboro Taunton Regional Transit Authority, or GATRA, which provides bus transit between the two cities and the surrounding regions.

For airports, Attleboro is served by Rhode Island TF Green International Airport to the south in Warwick, Rhode Island and Boston Logan International Airport to the north in Boston, Massachusetts.

== Notable people ==
- Artine Artinian (1907–2005), scholar of French literature
- Cathy Berberian (1925–1983), composer, mezzo-soprano singer, and vocalist born in Attleboro
- George Bradburn (1806–1880), an American politician and Unitarian minister in Massachusetts, known for his support for abolitionism and women's rights
- Jonathan P. Braga (b.1969) United States Army lieutenant general
- Geoff Cameron (born 1985), soccer player
- Horace Capron (1804–1885), Union Army officer during the Civil War and later an agricultural advisor to Japan; his methods revolutionized Japanese agriculture
- David Cobb (1748–1830), major general of the Continental Army, speaker of the Massachusetts House of Representatives, United States Congressman from Massachusetts
- Ray Conniff (1916–2002), easy listening recording artist
- Mark Coogan (born 1966), coach and retired American track athlete, first Massachusetts native to run the mile in under four minutes, placing 41st with a time of 2:20:27, after placing second in the U.S. Olympic Trials Marathon with at time of 2:13:05
- David Daggett (1764–1851), United States Senator, associate justice of Connecticut Supreme Court, mayor of New Haven, Connecticut, and a founder of the Yale Law School
- Naphtali Daggett (1727–1780), Presbyterian clergyman, professor of divinity at Yale University, fought in the American Revolutionary War
- Gilbert Franklin (1919–2004), American sculptor, educator
- Paul G. Gaffney II, President, Monmouth University, US Navy Vice Admiral (Ret.), former Chief of Naval Research, President of National Defense University
- Steve Hagerty, 21st Mayor of Evanston, IL, and founder and CEO of Hagerty Consulting, Inc
- William Manchester (1922–2004), historian and biographer, author of The Death of a President
- Jonathan Maxcy (1768–1820), Baptist clergyman and president of Brown University
- Virgil Maxcy (1785–1844), member of the Maryland House of Delegates and the Maryland State Senate, later first solicitor of the treasury and chargé d'affaires at the United States embassy in Belgium
- Martha Nickerson (1970–2011), teacher, librarian, and amateur photographer
- Christian Petersen (1885–1961), sculptor who worked as a die-cutter in Attleboro
- Helen Watson Phelps (1864–1944), painter
- Daniel Read (1757–1836), composer, who published 400 hymns in several collections
- Robert Rounseville (1914–1974), operatic tenor, who appeared in the films The Tales of Hoffmann and Carousel, and onstage in the original productions of the musicals Candide and Man of La Mancha
- Howard Smith (1893–1968), American actor, singer
- Abby Trott, voice actress and singer
- Robert A. Weygand (born 1948), U.S. representative

== See also ==
- List of mill towns in Massachusetts
