= List of mayors of Evanston, Illinois =

This is a list of mayors of the city of Evanston, Illinois.

== List ==
| Name | Start | End | Notes | Cite |
|---|---|---|---|---|
| Oscar Henry Mann | 1892 | March 31, 1895 | | |
| William Andrew Dyche | March 31, 1895 | April 25, 1899 | | |
| Thomas Bates | April 25, 1899 | April 23, 1901 | | |
| James A. Patten | April 23, 1901 | 1903 | | |
| John Thomas Barker | 1903 | 1907 | | |
| Joseph Everett Paden | 1907 | 1913 | | |
| James R. Smart | 1913 | 1915 | | |
| Harry Putnam Pearsons | 1915 | 1925 | | |
| Charles Henry Bartlett | 1925 | 1937 | | |
| Henry Day Penfield | 1937 | 1941 | | |
| Samuel Gilbert Ingraham | 1941 | 1953 | | |
| John R. Kimbark | April 20, 1953 | August 1, 1962 | Resigned due to illness | |
| Otto R. Hills | 1962 | 1962 | Acting mayor | |
| John D. Emery | 1962 | 1970 | | |
| Peter D. Jans | 1970 | 1970 | Acting mayor | |
| Edgar Vanneman Jr. | 1970 | 1977 | | |
| James C. Lytle | 1977 | 1985 | | |
| Joan Barr | 1985 | 1993 | First female mayor | |
| Lorraine H. Morton | 1993 | May 11, 2009 | First African-American mayor and first Democratic mayor | |
| Elizabeth Tisdahl | May 11, 2009 | May 8, 2017 | | |
| Steve Hagerty | May 8, 2017 | May 10, 2021 | | |
| Daniel Biss | May 10, 2021 | October 18, 2026 | | |
| Clare Kelly | October 19, 2026 | October 26, 2026 | A mayor pro tempore served during the vacancy | |
| Jonathan Nieuwsma | October 26, 2026 | present | Acting mayor | |

== See also ==
- Evanston history
