= Martha Nickerson =

- Born: January 1, 1925; Attleboro, Massachusetts
- Died: February 23, 2011 (aged 41)
- Monuments: Nickerson Walking Woods Preserve
- Education: Bridgewater State University (BS); Teachers College, Columbia University (MA, PhD)
- Occupations: Teacher, librarian, photographer

Martha Nickerson (1 January 1925 – 23 February 2011) was an American teacher, librarian, and amateur photographer. 48 acres of land donated to the Attleboro Land Trust by Nickerson in 2001 is today the Nickerson Walking Woods Preserve.

== Life ==
Martha Nickerson was born in Attleboro, Massachusetts, where she remained a resident all her life. She was the daughter of Franklin Graham Nickerson Sr. and Martha O. Nickerson (née Logan).

She obtained her BS from Bridgewater State Tech College in 1947, and her MA and Doctorate in Education from the Teachers College, Columbia University.

Nickerson was a teacher and librarian for the Attleboro School District. Between 1956 and 1967, she taught at schools in France, Japan, Morocco, Labrador, Turkey, the Netherlands, and England.

Nickerson was a member of the Murray Unitarian Universalist Church of Attleboro, and of the Attleboro chapter of the Daughters of the American Revolution.

When the city planned to widen the street on which she lived, Nickerson fought successfully to save a large Beech tree in front of her house.

Nickerson died on 23 February 2011 at Sturdy Memorial Hospital.

== Nickerson Walking Woods Preserve ==
In 2001, Nickerson dedicated 48 acres of conservation land to the Attleboro Land Trust. This is now the Nickerson Walking Woods Preserve. The land comprised the former Nickerson family dairy farm, where Nickerson had spent her life. Her parents had purchased the land in 1918.

John E. Hagerty donated a further five acres in 2013.

== Photography ==
In 2012, artist Kalliope Amorphous purchased a large number of containers filled with Kodachrome slides from an estate sale in Attleboro. The collection contained thousands of Nickerson's photographs, "documenting travel, education, and daily life across the mid-20th century".

Nickerson travelled extensively between the 1950s and the 1980s, and the photographs' coverage includes the United States, Iran, Germany, Japan, Jerusalem, the Netherlands, Paris, England, Morocco, and Turkey.

Amorphous subsequently digitized the collection, researching more about Nickerson's life and making the photographs available online. According to Amorphous:

Her archive offers a female-authored record of mid-20th century life around the globe, one that is both culturally significant and increasingly uncommon to find.
