= Helen Guillette Vassallo =

Researcher and businessperson

Helen Guillette Vassallo is an American scientific researcher, educator, author, lecturer, and business leader noted for her contributions to the fields of physiology, pharmacology, and anesthesia.

== Education ==
In 1949, Vassallo graduated as the valedictorian from Attleboro High School in Massachusetts. While in high school, she won Honorable Mention in the Westinghouse Science Talent Search. She went on to Tufts University to earn a Bachelor of Science in biology and a Master of Science in pharmacology. In 1967, Vassallo earned her doctorate in physiology from Clark University. A few years later, she received her Master of Business Administration degree from Worcester Polytechnic Institute (WPI).

== Career ==
Vassallo was the second woman faculty member at WPI, and later was the second woman to be named full professor there. Vassallo spent 20 years in the private sector, joining Astra Pharmaceutical Products as a researcher, eventually becoming the director of scientific and professional information. In 1967, while on loan from Clark University, Vassallo began teaching molecular biology as an adjunct professor in WPI's chemistry department. In 1982, Vassallo left the corporate world to join WPI as a full-time professor of management and an adjunct professor in the Biology Department. She was the first woman to be elected secretary of the faculty, the highest faculty post at the university. Vassallo was also an advisor to the Phi Sigma Sigma sorority, an advisor for freshmen women, and a mentor for new young women faculty members at WPI. Additionally, she served as a member of the President's Council for the Advancement of Women and Minorities, chief justice of the Campus Hearing Board, and chair of the Committee of the Status of Women, established in 1996.

== Selected publications ==
- Covino, B., & Vassallo, H. (1976). Local anesthetics : mechanisms of action and clinical use. New York: Grune & Stratton. ISBN 9780808909187
- Nevis, E., Lancourt, J., & Vassallo, H. (1996). Intentional revolutions : a seven-point strategy for transforming organizations (1st ed.). San Francisco, Calif: Jossey-Bass. ISBN 978-0787902407
- Vassallo, H., & Lanasa, J. (1990). The effects of cognitive style on the design of expert systems. (simulation of human intelligence in the design of expert systems or computers). Review of Business, 12(3), 37.
- Morishima, H., Finster, M., Pedersen, H., Fukunaga, A., Ronfeld, R., Vassallo, H., & Covino, B. (1979). Pharmacokinetics of Lidocaine in Fetal and Neonatal Lambs and Adult Sheep. Anesthesiology, 50(5), 431–436. doi: 10.1097/00000542-197905000-00011
- Adams, H., Blair, M., Boyes, R., Lebeaux, M., & Vassallo, H. (1978). THERAPEUTICAL COMPOSITIONS.

== Awards and honors ==
- National Woman of the Year by the American Businesswomen's Association
- Worcester Polytechnic Institute Board of Trustees’ Award for Outstanding Teaching in 2003
- Worcester Polytechnic Institute Woman of Courage award by WPI's Women's Program in 2008
- Women of Consequence award from the Office of the City Manager's Commission on the Status of Women in Worcester in 2008
