= TJ Guy =

American football player (born 2003)

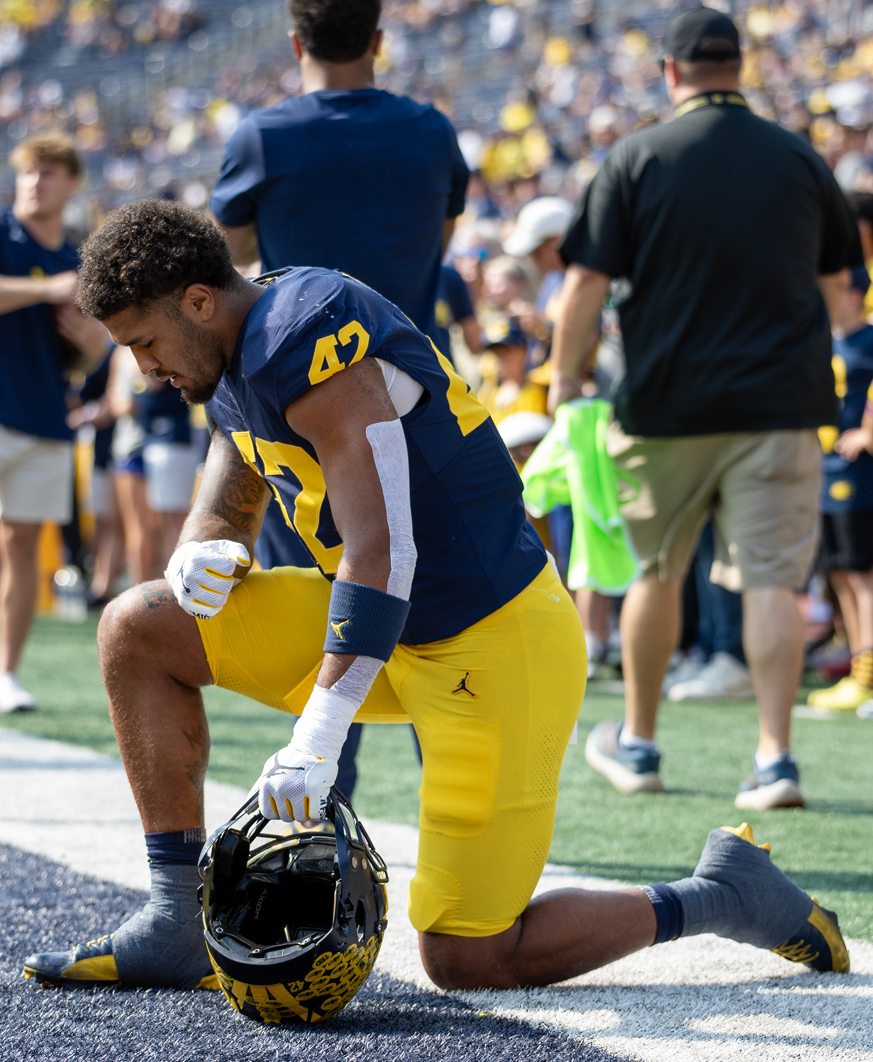
- Guy with the Michigan Wolverines in 2024

Montreal Alouettes
- Position: Defensive end
- Roster status: Practice roster
- CFL status: American

Personal information
- Born: March 7, 2003 (age 23)
- Listed height: 6 ft 4 in (1.93 m)
- Listed weight: 247 lb (112 kg)

Career information
- High school: Mansfield (Mansfield, Massachusetts)
- College: Michigan (2021–2025)

Career history
- Montreal Alouettes (2026–present)

Awards and highlights
- CFP national champion (2023)
- Stats at ESPN

Terrence Terrell "TJ" Guy (born March 7, 2003) is an American football defensive end for the Montreal Alouettes of the Canadian Football League (CFL). He played college football for the Michigan Wolverines, winning three consecutive Big Ten Conference titles and a national championship in 2023.

== Early life ==
Terrence Terrell Guy was born on March 7, 2003. He is the son of Darrius and Laureen C. South, and attended Mansfield High School in Mansfield, Massachusetts. Coming out of high school, Guy was rated as a three-star recruit and committed to play college football for the Michigan Wolverines over offers from schools such as Boston College, Nebraska, Pittsburgh, Syracuse, UConn and Virginia.

== College career ==
In his first three collegiate seasons, 2021 to 2023, Guy appeared in 23 games, recording 16 tackles, three for a loss and two sacks; winning a national championship with the Wolverines in 2023. In week 5 of the 2024 season, he got his first career start, registering his first sack of the season in a victory over Minnesota. In total, Guy appeared in all 13 games for the Wolverines in 2024 and started three times, finishing with 32 tackles, seven for a loss and was second on the team with 5.5 sacks.

In 2025, Guy returned for a fifth year and earned a starting defensive end role. In the first game of the season against New Mexico, he had his first-career interception.

== Professional career ==
Pre-draft measurables
Height	Weight	Arm length	Hand span	Wingspan
6 ft 3 5/8 in (1.92 m)	247 lb (112 kg)	31 5/8 in (0.80 m)	9 7/8 in (0.25 m)	6 ft 6 1/4 in (1.99 m)
All values from Pro Day

On July 2, 2026, Guy signed with the Montreal Alouettes of the Canadian Football League (CFL).
