= Joan Barr =

American mayor

18th Mayor of Evanston, Illinois
- In office 1985–1993
- Preceded by: James C. Lytle
- Succeeded by: Lorraine H. Morton

Personal details
- Born: November 22, 1939
- Died: March 21, 2015
- Party: Democratic; M.B.A. Northwestern University
- Education: B.A. Syracuse University

Joan W. Barr (née Worthy; later Barr-Smith; November 22, 1939 – March 21, 2015) was an American politician and the first woman elected as mayor of the city of Evanston, Illinois. Barr Smith was elected in 1985 and sworn into her position on April 22, 1985, by Cook County Circuit Judge Michael Toomin. Prior to her election to the role of mayor, she served eight years as an alderman to the city's Second Ward.

== Early life and career ==
Joan was the only child of James (a professor at Kellogg School of Management) and Mildred Louise Worthy (née Neritz). The family lived in the Rogers Park neighborhood of Chicago while Barr was young. The family relocated to the North Shore area when Barr was four years old.

Barr attended New Trier High School in Winnetka, Illinois. She continued her education at Syracuse University, where she earned a bachelor's degree. She subsequently earned her MBA from Kellogg School of Management at Northwestern University, becoming part of the class of 1996.

She moved to Evanston in 1962, before serving two years as president of the Dewey Community Conference. In 1977, she was elected alderman from Evanston's Second Ward. She served out her aldermanic term and was reelected for a second one in 1981.

In 1985, she made a successful bid for the position of mayor against two individuals: the retiring alderman Donald Borah, and Rev. John Frederick Norwood, then pastor of the Mt. Zion Missionary Baptist Church in Evanston. Her election marked the first time in Evanston's history that a woman held the role of mayor. Her inaugural address noted burdensome residential real estate taxes as a priority to address. The amount of tax-exempt properties in the city was seen by the community as contributing to what was then one of the highest real estate taxes in the Chicago area. She also noted economic development, improving the relationship between the city and Northwestern University; street gangs and homelessness were priority areas for her tenure.

=== Mayoral tenure ===
While mayor, Barr remained active in numerous civic organizations. She served as President of the Northwest Municipal Conference and was a member of the Executive Committee of the U.S. Conference of Mayors. She served that organization as chair of the Woman Mayors group.

During her tenure, she became known for fostering improved town–gown relations, partnering with Northwestern University on building a $400 million dollar research park in Evanston, and vetoing a proposed tuition tax on students at the University. Stemming from her work in establishing the research park, Barr was called "a consensus builder" by Evanston Inventure (a city-wide development corporation) executive director, Ronald Kysiak. According to the local newspaper, the Chicago Tribune, moderator and consensus builder also describe how Barr saw her own role. She was also viewed by others as non-confrontational in her style of government, focused on forging connections and non-partisanship community building.

Barr was elected for a second mayoral term in 1989 and stepped down from the position in 1992. Following her time as mayor, she worked for the Illinois Department of Revenue and the Illinois Department of Employment Security. She became a deacon in the Episcopal Church in 2008.
