= Mansfield High School (Massachusetts) =

Mansfield Academic Responsibility’s Program

Location
- 250 East Street; Mansfield, Massachusetts 02048; United States; 42°1′46″N 71°12′16″W

Information
- Type: Public
- Established: 1872
- School district: Mansfield Public Schools
- Principal: Russ Booth
- Teaching staff: 94.16 (FTE)
- Grades: 9 to 12
- Enrollment: 1,035 (2023-2024)
- Student to teacher ratio: 13.23:1
- Colors: Green, Black & White
- Athletics: MIAA - Division 2
- Athletics conference: Hockomock League
- Mascot: Sting the Hornet
- Team name: Hornets
- Rival: Foxborough
- Website: mhs.mansfieldschools.com

Mansfield High School (MHS) is a four-year, comprehensive public high school located in Mansfield, Massachusetts, United States. It is the only high school in the Mansfield Public Schools system. MHS has approximately 1,300 students in grades nine though twelve. The school teams are named the Hornets, the mascot is Sting the Hornet, and the school colors are green, white, and black.

== Academics ==
=== Faculty ===
Mansfield High School (2018-2019) employs 299 teachers with 83 teaching within the eight core academic departments. This leads to an overall student to teacher ratio of 13.23 to 1, which is in line with the 13 to 1 statewide student to teacher ratio.

=== Graduation requirements ===
For the current graduating class, the Class of 2022, students are required to complete and pass courses totaling 124 credits. Twenty-five of those must be passed during the students’ senior year. In addition to credit requirements, students used to have to pass the state-required MCAS exam, but after the passing of Question 2 in the 2024 referendum, it’s no longer required to graduate. There are also departmental requirements for graduation.

=== Courses ===
In addition to the core classes, MHS offers:

- Advanced Placement – Gives students the ability to earn college credit. These courses are more difficult than the average high school course. Advanced Placement (AP) courses end with an exam administered by the College Board which determines how much credit the student receives. Each student can take at most nine Advanced Placement courses at MHS.
- Honors – These courses contain challenging material. They are more difficult than the standard College Preparatory classes.
- College preparatory – These courses prepare students for college level education.
- Comprehensive – These courses are designed to prepare students for junior (two-year) college or work after high school.

==== Grading ====
Students at Mansfield High School are graded on a 0-100 scale, where an A is 90-100, a B is 80-89, a C is 70-79, a D is 65-69, and anything below a 65 is considered failing.

==== Class rank ====
Class rank has been removed starting with the Class of 2023. The graduating Class of 2022 was the last class to receive class rank and top ten recognition.

== Performing arts ==
- Choir - The choir puts on several concerts per year, including the Holiday Concert and Spring Concert, and also directs and produces the school's fall play and spring musical. There are three different choirs, the Concert Choir, the After School Choir, and the Select Choir.
- Orchestra - The orchestra performs several times per year, including the Holiday Concert.
- Band - The Band Program includes Marching Band, Jazz Band, and a Concert Band. The extracurricular band programs include a World Champion Percussion Ensemble (WGI, PSCO), and a competitive Winter Colorguard (2010 NESBA Champions). The Marching Band performs at many school events, including the MIAA Super Bowl, supporting the MHS Football team. The Percussion Ensemble and Winter Colorguard compete in the New England Scholastic Band Association and Winter Guard International.
- Percussion Ensemble - The Mansfield High School Percussion Ensemble has competed at WGI World Championships in 2007 (PSCO Gold Medalists), 2008 (PSCO Gold Medalists; received the highest score in indoor percussion history, 98.9, which was then outscored in 2012), 2009 (PSCW Silver Medalists) 2012 (PSCO Silver Medalists, PSA Finalist), 2013 (PSCO Bronze Medalists) 2014 (PSCO Silver Medalists) and 2015 (PSCO Gold Medalists). The group also holds NESBA Championships in PSCO 2007, 2008, 2009, 2012 and 2013, and NESBA Championships in PSAA in 2010, 2011, and 2012.

== Athletics ==
Below is a list of the athletic programs offered at Mansfield, and the seasons when they are held.

- Fall – Cheerleading, Cross Country, Field Hockey, Football, Golf, Soccer, and Volleyball.
- Winter – Basketball, Cheerleading, Gymnastics, Ice Hockey, Indoor Track, Swimming, and Wrestling
- Spring – Baseball, Softball, Lacrosse, Tennis, and Track and Field.

Mansfield High School offers 25 different varsity level sports. All sports have junior varsity and varsity levels and some sports have a freshman level as well. Mansfield sports teams are known as the Hornets and the school colors are Green, White and Black. Mansfield had an artificial turf football field installed behind the high school along with a rubber track in 2001. A new baseball complex was constructed in 2005, located across the street, in front of the Jordan Jackson Elementary school. Mansfield competes in the Hockomock League

=== Football ===
The Hornets won the Hockomock League Championship six years in a row from 2003 – 2008, and won it four years in a row from 2010 - 2013. The 2013 Mansfield football season was an especially successful season, as they began the season by defeating national power and three-time defending Maryland state champions, Dunbar High School of Baltimore, MD in a televised game. Mansfield defeated Dunbar in a last second 29-26 upset win. The Hornets then ran the table throughout the season, eventually finishing the season undefeated at 13-0, winning their 7th state championship in the process, and finished the season as the #1 ranked team in Massachusetts and the New England region. They were state champions in 1992, 1994, 1996, 2003, 2004, 2010, 2013 and 2019.

=== Track & field ===
The indoor track team has won 3 straight Indoor Track State Championships, along with 11 straight Hockomock League Championships in the same sport.

=== Basketball ===
In the 2012 - 2013 season, the boys' basketball team finished with an undefeated regular season and made it to the Division 1 State Championship, and lost. They finished the season being the #1 ranked boys' basketball team in Massachusetts.

== Notable alumni ==
- Tom Gilson, American football player (UMass) (Arena: Portland Steel)
- TJ Guy, college football defensive end for the Michigan Wolverines
- Jen Royle, American former reporter/journalist for YES Network and current private chef
