= Attleboro High School =

Location
- 1 Blue Pride Way; Attleboro, MA 02703; United States; 41°56′20″N 71°18′05″W

Information
- Type: Public
- Superintendent: David Sawyer
- Principal: Colby Young
- Teaching staff: 122.75 (on an FTE basis)
- Grades: 9–12
- Enrollment: 2,030 (2024–2025)
- Student to teacher ratio: 15.68
- Campus: Urban
- Houses: 4
- Colors: Blue, silver, and white
- Athletics conference: Hockomock League
- Mascot: Blue Bombardier
- Nickname: Bombardiers
- Rival: North Attleborough High School, Bishop Feehan High School
- Newspaper: Blue Pride TV
- Yearbook: Tattletale
- Website: ahs.attleboroschools.com/o/ahs

Attleboro High School is a public high school in Attleboro, Massachusetts, United States. The school is located at 1 Blue Pride Way. It has an approximate student enrollment of 1,750 students in grades 9–12. The school's teams are known as the Blue Bombardiers, and the school colors are Royal Blue, Silver, and White.

In August 2022, the district completed construction on a new US$259.9 million, 475,000-square-foot (44,100 m^{2}) building to replace the former building previously located at 100 Rathbun Willard Drive. As of November 17, 2022, the "Blue Bombardiers" has been redesigned.

In 2025, Craig Levis was the principal of Attleboro High School, following the resignation of Kate Campbell. As of 2026, the principal is Colby Young.

== Demographics ==
For the 2023–2024 school year, the demographic profile of the enrollment was as follows:

=== Genders ===
- Male – 53%
- Female – 47%

=== Races ===
- Black – 10.2%
- Asian – 4.7%
- Hispanic – 18.0%
- Native American – 0.2%
- White – 60.3%
- Native Hawaiian, Pacific Islanders – 0.1%
- Multiracial – 6.4%

== Athletics ==
Attleboro has a very long rivalry with neighboring towns North Attleborough High School. The football teams have played each other on Thanksgiving Day for the past 102 years. As of 2010, Attleboro competes in the Hockomock League. Before the move to the Hockomock, Attleboro competed in many other leagues such as the Bristol County League (BCL), Southeastern Massachusetts Conference (SMC), Eastern Athletic Conference (EAC), and the Old Colony League (OCL).

- Fall Cheerleading National Champions – 2006, 2007, 2008, 2009, 2013, 2014
- Boys' Basketball D-I State Champions – 1943, 1998

== Notable alumni ==
- Meagan Fuller (class of 2010), Miss Massachusetts 2015
- Steve Hagerty (class of 1987), 21st mayor of Evanston, Illinois, and founder and CEO of Hagerty Consulting, Inc.
- Paul Heroux (class of 1995), former member of the Massachusetts House of Representatives, mayor of Attleboro, current Bristol County sheriff
- Abby Trott (class of 2004), voice actress, known for her roles as Nezuko Kamado in Demon Slayer: Kimetsu no Yaiba and Ivy in Carmen Sandiego
- Helen Guillette Vassallo (class of 1949), scientific researcher, educator, author, lecturer, and business leader
