= Henry Day Penfield =

American mayor

10th Mayor of Evanston, Illinois
- In office 1937–1941
- Preceded by: Charles Henry Bartlett
- Succeeded by: Samuel Gilbert Ingraham

Personal details
- Born: July 23, 1900 Evanston, Illinois
- Died: October 29, 1984 (age 84) Scottsdale, Arizona
- Spouse: Henrietta Calkins Penfield
- Parent: Louis Chapin Penfield (father)
- Education: B.A. Northwestern University

Henry Day Penfield (July 23, 1900 – October 29, 1984) was an American politician and the mayor of the city of Evanston, Illinois.

== Biography ==
Penfield was born in Evanston, Illinois in 1900 the son of Louis Chapin Penfield. He attended Evanston High School and finished his final year at the Phillips Academy in Andover, Massachusetts. In 1923, he graduated with a B.A. from Northwestern University. At Northwestern, he was a star athlete earning letters in football and swimming; and was named to the all-Western and all-Conference football teams. After school, he took a job at the Northwestern Mutual Insurance Company. In 1931, he was elected as the treasure of Evanston, the youngest to have held the position. In 1933, he ran for mayor alleging that the current administration tolerated the presence of speakeasies; he lost by 2,300 votes. In 1935, he won re-election as treasurer and in 1937, he successfully won a 4-year term as the mayor of Evanston. His tenure was difficult as the assessed value of property had declined while the population had increased by 10,000. He ran for re-election as mayor in 1941 but was defeated by Samuel Gilbert Ingraham. With the outbreak of World War II, he served as a lieutenant commander in the Navy in charge of recruitment in the Chicago area. After the war, he worked for a recruitment firm, George Frye Associates and then as the City Manager for Paradise Valley, Arizona He retired in 1963.

He died on October 29, 1984, in Scottsdale, Arizona.

== Personal life ==
He was married to Henrietta Calkins; they had three children: Ann, Nancy and Henry Jr.
