= Lorraine H. Morton =

American mayor (1918–2018)

19th Mayor of Evanston, Illinois
- In office 1993 – May 11, 2009
- Preceded by: Joan W. Barr
- Succeeded by: Elizabeth Tisdahl

Personal details
- Born: December 8, 1918 Winston-Salem, North Carolina, U.S.
- Died: September 8, 2018 (aged 99) Skokie, Illinois, U.S.
- Party: Democratic
- Education: B.A. Winston-Salem State University; M.A. Northwestern University

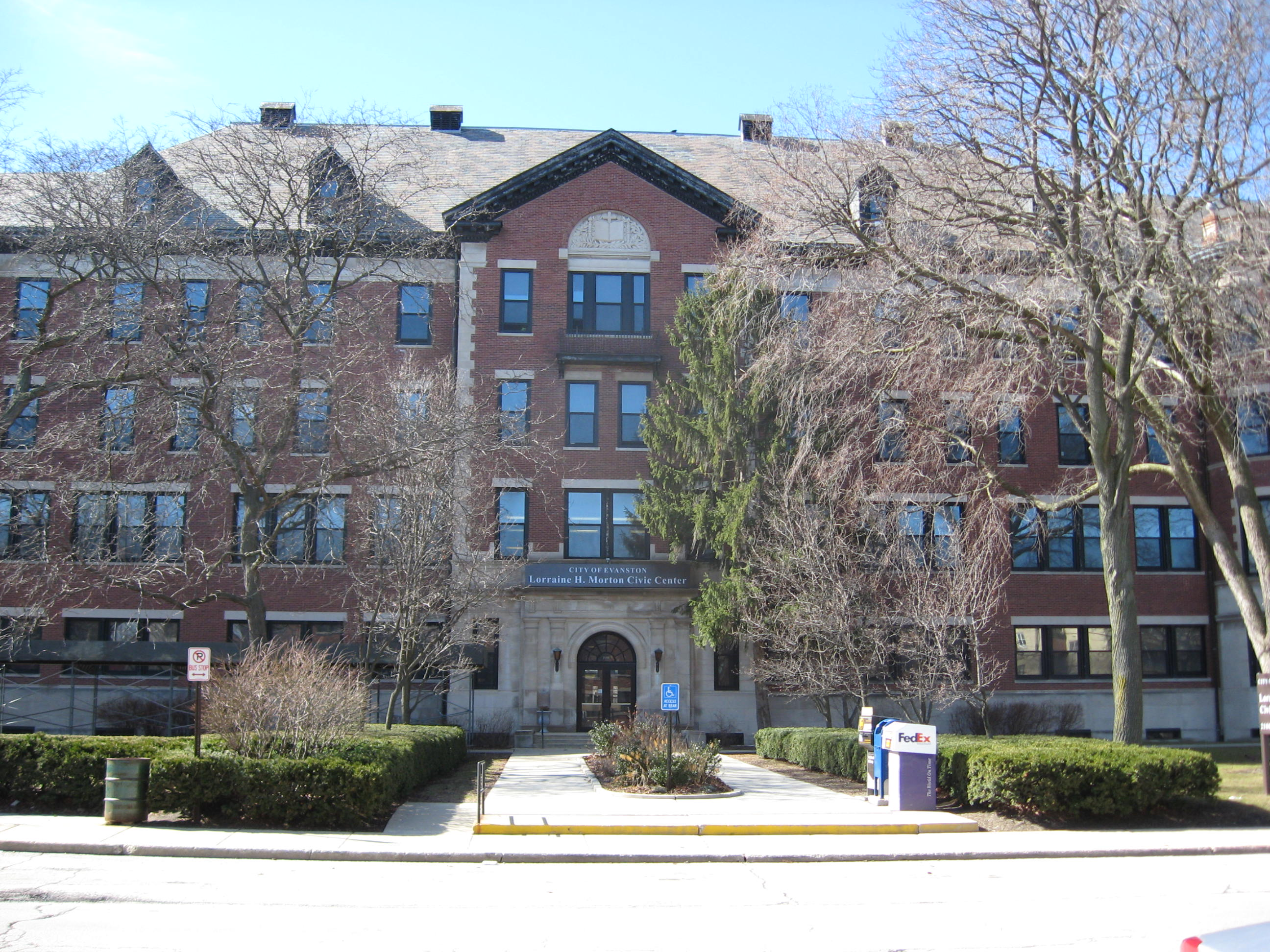
The Lorraine H. Morton Civic Center at 2100 Ridge Ave in Evanston, IL

Lorraine Hairston Morton (December 8, 1918 – September 8, 2018) was an American politician who was the mayor of Evanston, Illinois, from 1993 to 2009. Morton was Evanston's first African-American mayor, first Democratic mayor, and longest-serving mayor. She is also notable for spearheading the desegregation of Evanston's public schools as a teacher and school principal.

== Early life ==
Morton was born in Winston-Salem, North Carolina, the youngest child of Keziah Hairston, a schoolteacher, and William Patrick Hairston, a prosperous businessman who helped found the Winston Mutual Life Insurance Company (now the Golden Gate Insurance Company). She received a bachelor's degree in education in 1938 from Winston-Salem State University in North Carolina and a master's degree in curriculum (education) from Northwestern University in 1942. She moved to Evanston in 1953 with her husband, Dr. James T. Morton Jr. (1911-1974) who was a clinical psychologist and worked at Evanston Hospital. Both Morton and her husband taught at the Tuskegee Institute before moving to Evanston. The couple had one daughter and two grandchildren.

== Teaching career ==
Prior to her experience in municipal government, Morton was an educator in the District 65 school system from 1953 to 1989. She began teaching in Evanston in 1953 at the now-closed Foster Elementary School, which was at that time the only elementary school for African-Americans in Evanston. Morton then went on to teach at Nichols Middle School from 1957-1966 and Chute Middle School from 1966–1977, becoming the first African-American educator to teach in an Evanston school outside of Foster School. In 1977, after twenty-five years of teaching in the District 65 school system, Morton was appointed principal of Evanston's Haven Middle School and held the position until she retired from teaching in 1989. She also held life membership in the Illinois Congress of Parents and Teachers.

== Municipal career ==
=== Alderman of the Fifth Ward ===
Morton continued her long career of community service and public engagement when she agreed to serve as alderman of the Fifth Ward of Evanston, an Evanston City Council position she held from 1982 to 1991. As a member of the Evanston City Council, she served in committees on Housing and Community Development, Police Services, Planning and Development, Human Services, and Rules, as well as on the Unified Budget Panel. She also worked on special committees on fair housing, libraries, and gangs.

=== Mayor of Evanston ===
In 1993, Morton ran for mayor of Evanston under the campaign slogan "Morton for Mayor," which accompanied images of trains and lists of people who were "on board" with her campaign. After a run-off election against Ann Rainey, alderman of Evanston's Eighth Ward, Morton was elected Evanston's first African-American and first Democratic mayor. She was in office for sixteen years (until 2009), becoming Evanston's longest-serving mayor.

During her long mayoral tenure, Morton attempted to improve the town-gown relationship between Northwestern University and the greater population of Evanston. She was able to form a close friendship with Northwestern University president Henry Bienen and ameliorate the tension between Evanston and the University given her status as both the Mayor of Evanston and a proud alumna of Northwestern.

Mayor Morton also worked with local community leaders and churches to create a safe zone and a "time out" period of time that gangs would call a truce. During this time, (Friday and Saturday nights, a time of would-be heightened gang activity) the community, including gang members were invited to play basketball at Evanston's Robert Crown Center. Morton would often be seen cheering from the sidelines

== Awards and honors ==
Both of her alma maters have recognized Morton's achievements. Winston-Salem State University created the Lorraine Hairston Morton Endowed Scholarship in 2010 for students majoring in education who are committed to community service. Northwestern University, too, offers a scholarship in Morton's name—the Lorraine H. Morton Scholarship for the Master of Science in Education Program in the School of Education and Social Policy. Further, Northwestern presented her with an Alumni Merit Award in 1996 and bestowed an honorary doctorate upon her in 2008. She also held an honorary doctorate for public service from Kendall College in Chicago.

Evanston's civic center was renamed for Morton at the time of her retirement in 2009 and is now known as the Lorraine H. Morton Civic Center. She held the position of Vice President of the Evanston Historical Society and received community service awards from Saint Francis Hospital of Evanston and the Evanston Arts Council.

In 2018, Shorefront (https://shorefrontlegacy.org) produced the documentary film "Lorraine H. Morton: A Life Worthwhile", (https://vimeo.com/252383973) as told by Morton herself, illustrated with historic images and film clips. The 45 minute documentary depicts her early life, education, early career as a teacher, alderman and as mayor of Evanston.

== Death ==
Morton died on September 8, 2018, at the age of 99.
