= First Bank & Trust =

American commercial bank

FB&T | First Bank & Trust
- Industry: Commercial banking Financial services
- Area served: Chicago metropolitan area
- Products: Banking; Trust company
- Website: www.firstbt.com

First Bank & Trust (FB&T) was a community and commercial bank founded in Evanston, Illinois, that was legally acquired by Chicago's Byline Bank in 2018 after the company filed for bankruptcy in 2015. FB&T was originally founded in 1995 by Robert Yohanan, Howard Kain and James Lytle.
