= North Attleborough High School =

Location
- 1 Wilson W. Whitty Way; North Attleborough, Massachusetts 02760; United States; 41°58′55.95″N 71°18′35.55″W

Information
- Established: 1887
- School board: James McKenna (Chairman) <Be> Kevin O'Donnell (Secretary), Ethan Hamilton, Kathryn Hobbs, Talia Yourell, John Costello, Carol Wagner, Colin Madden, Saksham Verma
- Superintendent: John Antonucci
- Chairperson: Ethan Hamilton
- Principal: Thomas Rizzo
- Teaching staff: 77.65 (FTE)
- Grades: 9–12
- Average class size: 21
- Student to teacher ratio: 13.11
- Colors: Red and White
- Athletics conference: Hockomock League
- Team name: Rocketeers
- Rival: Attleboro High School
- Accreditation: New England Association of Schools and Colleges
- Newspaper: The First Launch
- Yearbook: Northern Light
- Website: https://www.naschools.net/o/nahs

North Attleborough High School is a public high school in North Attleborough, Massachusetts, United States, educating grades 9 through 12 with over one thousand students enrolled.

== History ==
North Attleborough High School was located in the current Community School building until the fall of 1973 when it moved into its current location on Wilson W. Whitty Way. On 3 June 2025, a vote was conducted on whether or not to build a new high school, which ultimately led to voters approving the project. The new building will serve up to 1,025 students and be larger than the current high school building.

== Athletics ==
The sports teams are known as the North Attleborough Rocketeers, formally the Red Rocketeers. The school has a long-standing rivalry with neighboring Attleboro High School, with both schools' football teams playing against each other on Thanksgiving Day for the past 104 years. Both schools play in the Hockomock League. The '24-25 Rocketeers football team finished 11-2, good enough for 9th in the State. Andrew Hanwell (Class of 2015), Emily Marshall (Class of 2018) and Celine Ibrahim (Class of 2019) are notable for their record-breaking times in the 400 and 800 meter dash respectively, records that still stand today. The school's slogan "Go Big Red!" is often used at sporting events.

== Notable alumni ==
- Joseph W. Martin Jr. (1902): Speaker of the House of Representatives from 1947 to 1949 and again from 1953 to 1955.
- Allen Ripley: former MLB player
- Chris Sullivan (1992): former NFL defensive lineman.
- Anthony Sherman (2007): former NFL fullback
- Colin Grafton (2010) Figure skater
