= Anthony Sherman =

American football player (born 1988)

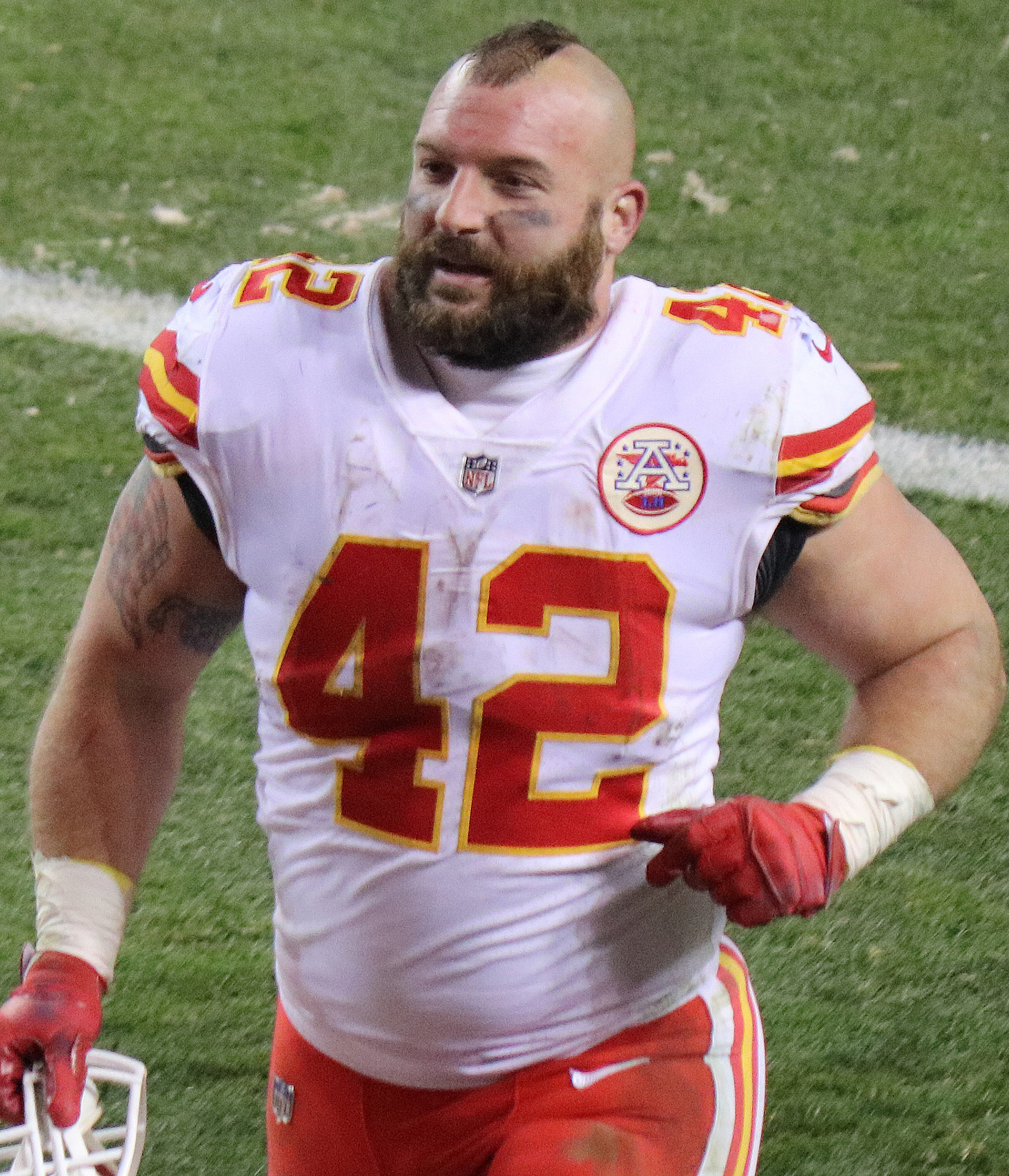
- Sherman with the Kansas City Chiefs in 2017

No. 35, 42
- Position: Fullback

Personal information
- Born: December 11, 1988 (age 37); North Attleboro, Massachusetts, U.S.
- Listed height: 5 ft 10 in (1.78 m)
- Listed weight: 242 lb (110 kg)

Career information
- High school: North Attleborough
- College: UConn (2007–2010)
- NFL draft: 2011: 5th round, 136th overall pick

Career history
- Arizona Cardinals (2011–2012); Kansas City Chiefs (2013–2020)

Awards and highlights
- Super Bowl champion (LIV); Second-team All-Pro (2014); Pro Bowl (2018)

Career NFL statistics
- Rushing yards: 73
- Rushing touchdowns: 1
- Receptions: 66
- Receiving yards: 552
- Receiving touchdowns: 4
- Stats at Pro Football Reference

Anthony Michael Sherman (born December 11, 1988) is an American former professional football player who was a fullback in the National Football League (NFL), primarily with the Kansas City Chiefs. He played college football for the UConn Huskies and was selected by the Arizona Cardinals in the fifth round of the 2011 NFL draft. His nickname is "Sausage".

== Early life ==
Sherman attended North Attleboro High School in North Attleboro, Massachusetts, where he was the team captain in football, track, and baseball. He was named the Massachusetts Gatorade Player of the Year in 2006. Sherman was named to the Attleboro Sun-Chronicle All-Star team thrice. In football, he rushed for 1,202 yards and 20 touchdowns as a senior, while also adding 100 tackles on defense. Sherman is the school's career leader in rushing yards (2,537) and touchdowns (48). In baseball, he was a two-time All-League selection.

In track & field, Sherman served as the team captain and competed in the sprinting and throwing events. In sprints, he recorded times of 6.98 seconds in the 55-meter dash and 12.19 seconds in the 100-meter dash. As a thrower, Sherman competed in the shot put and got a top-throw of 15.48 meters.

Coming out of high school, Sherman was rated a 3-star recruit by Rivals and 247 Sports. He received only two Division 1 scholarship offers, from UConn and Boston College. Sherman ultimately decided to commit to play for the University of Connecticut on February 7, 2007.

== College career ==
As a freshman in 2007, Sherman immediately became the starting fullback for the UConn Huskies and was the lead blocker for Donald Brown, the 2008 Big East Offensive Player of the Year.

As a sophomore in 2008, Sherman had his best year statistically. He had three carries for nine yards and 26 receptions for 270 yards, while also recording 13 tackles on special teams.

In his junior and senior seasons, Sherman was elected team captain and was the lead blocker for fellow Massachusetts native, Jordan Todman, who was the 2010 Big East Offensive Player of the Year and an ESPN All-American. Sherman scored his first collegiate touchdown during his senior season.

During his collegiate career, Sherman rushed for 61 yards on 17 carries, caught 48 passes for 477 yards and a touchdown, and had 63 total tackles.

== Professional career ==
Pre-draft measurables
Height	Weight	Arm length	Hand span	Wingspan	40-yard dash	10-yard split	20-yard split	20-yard shuttle	Three-cone drill	Vertical jump	Broad jump	Bench press
5 ft 10 1/4 in (1.78 m)	242 lb (110 kg)	30 in (0.76 m)	9 3/8 in (0.24 m)	6 ft 0 3/8 in (1.84 m)	4.78 s	1.65 s	2.79 s	4.41 s	7.23 s	32.5 in (0.83 m)	9 ft 3 in (2.82 m)	32 reps
All values from NFL Combine

=== Arizona Cardinals ===
Sherman was selected by the Arizona Cardinals in the fifth round (136th overall) of the 2011 NFL draft. As a rookie, he had eight receptions for 72 yards.

In the 2012 season, Sherman had five receptions for 39 yards.

=== Kansas City Chiefs ===
Sherman was traded to the Kansas City Chiefs on May 1, 2013, in exchange for cornerback Javier Arenas. On October 27, Sherman caught a touchdown pass from Alex Smith against the Cleveland Browns. Overall, he finished the 2013 season with 18 receptions for 155 yards and a touchdown. During the Wild Card Round against the Indianapolis Colts, Sherman recorded a five-yard receiving touchdown in the narrow 45–44 loss.

Sherman signed a contract extension with the Chiefs on November 5, 2014. Overall, he finished the 2014 season with 10 receptions for 71 yards and a touchdown.

In the 2015 season, Sherman only had four receptions for 34 yards but did appear in all 16 games.

In the 2016 season, Sherman appeared in all 16 games, of which he started three. Sherman totaled four receptions for 11 yards.

On September 17, 2017, in Week 2 against the Philadelphia Eagles, he recovered a fumble on a Darren Sproles punt return. In the last week of the 2017 season, Sherman scored his first rushing touchdown of his NFL career. Sherman scored up the middle against the Denver Broncos on a 14-carry, 40-yard performance. Overall, he finished the 2017 season with six receptions for 40 yards in addition to the 14 carries for 40 yards.

On March 12, 2018, Sherman signed a one-year contract extension with the Chiefs. In the Chiefs' 2018 season opener against the Los Angeles Chargers, he recorded a 36-yard receiving touchdown in the 38–28 victory.

On March 22, 2019, Sherman signed a one-year $1.02 million contract extension with the Chiefs, and won Super Bowl LIV with the team.

On April 6, 2020, Sherman signed a one-year contract with the Chiefs. Following the release of long-time Chiefs punter Dustin Colquitt in the offseason, Sherman became tied with Travis Kelce and Eric Fisher as the longest tenured members of the Chiefs. On October 13, Sherman was placed on the reserve/COVID-19 list after being exposed to someone who tested positive for COVID-19. Sherman would eventually test positive himself. He was activated on November 4.

Sherman announced his retirement from professional football on March 4, 2021.

== NFL career statistics ==
=== Regular season ===
Year	Team	Games		Rushing					Receiving					Fumbles	
Year	Team	GP	GS	Att	Yds	Avg	Lng	TD	Rec	Yds	Avg	Lng	TD	Fum	Lost
2011	ARI	15	7	1	3	3.0	3	0	8	72	9.0	19	0	0	0
2012	ARI	13	4	0	0	0.0	0	0	5	39	7.8	19	0	0	0
2013	KC	16	8	2	3	1.5	2	0	18	155	8.6	26	1	1	0
2014	KC	16	6	2	8	4.0	4	0	10	71	7.1	24	1	0	0
2015	KC	16	2	1	0	0.0	0	0	4	34	8.5	18	0	0	0
2016	KC	16	3	0	0	0.0	0	0	4	11	2.8	6	0	0	0
2017	KC	16	3	14	40	2.9	9	1	6	47	7.8	11	0	0	0
2018	KC	16	1	1	2	2.0	2	0	8	96	12.0	36	1	0	0
2019	KC	16	0	4	9	2.3	5	0	2	22	11.0	15	0	0	0
2020	KC	13	1	3	8	2.7	6	0	1	5	5.0	5	1	0	0
Career		153	35	28	73	2.6	9	1	66	552	8.4	36	4	1	0

=== Postseason ===
Year	Team	Games		Rushing					Receiving					Fumbles	
Year	Team	GP	GS	Att	Yds	Avg	Lng	TD	Rec	Yds	Avg	Lng	TD	Fum	Lost
2013	KC	1	1	0	0	0.0	0	0	2	1	0.5	5	1	0	0
2015	KC	2	0	0	0	0.0	0	0	2	4	2.0	0	0	0	0
2016	KC	1	0	0	0	0.0	0	0	1	3	3.0	0	0	0	0
2017	KC	1	0	0	0	0.0	0	0	0	0	0.0	0	0	0	0
2018	KC	2	0	0	0	0.0	0	0	0	0	0.0	0	0	0	0
2019	KC	3	0	0	0	0.0	0	0	0	0	0.0	0	0	0	0
2020	KC	3	0	0	0	0.0	0	0	0	0	0.0	0	0	0	0
Career		13	1	0	0	0.0	0	0	5	8	1.6	5	1	0	0

== Personal life ==
Sherman and his wife, Jessica, have three children together. They have partnered with the child sponsorship and Christian humanitarian aid organization Compassion International for various initiatives.

Sherman is a Christian.

=== Controversy ===
When speaking on the NFL's requirements for players during the 2021 season for players not vaccinated against COVID-19, Sherman generated controversy. The league had required unvaccinated players to wear a wristband. Those wristbands, Sherman compared to segregation on his Twitter account. He tweeted "The @NFL is making players wear colored wrist bands now based on vaccination status. Funny, I thought we all agreed on the evils of segregation back in the 60s. Here we are again- only this time it’s based on personal health choices instead of skin color". He followed that tweet up with another one saying "The league clearly values being woke, not awake. What a shame. And what a sham". The tweets received primarily mixed reactions.

Coaching

As of 2025, Sherman serves as an assistant coach for the St James Academy football team in Lenexa, Kansas.
