= Kat Abughazaleh =

American journalist and political candidate (born 1999)

- Abughazaleh in 2025
- Born: Katherine Marie Abughazaleh; March 24, 1999 (age 27); Dallas, Texas, U.S.
- Education: George Washington University (BA)
- Occupations: Internet personality; Journalist; Political candidate
- Employer: Media Matters for America (formerly)
- Political party: Democratic
- Movement: Progressivism; Democratic socialism
- Partner: Ben Collins

TikTok information
- Page: katmabu
- Years active: 2023–present
- Followers: 356.5 thousand

YouTube information
- Channel: katmabu
- Years active: 2023–present
- Subscribers: 169 thousand
- Views: 13.7 million
- Last updated: February 26, 2026
- Website: Campaign website Nonprofit website

Katherine Marie Abughazaleh (Note: Pronounced /ɑːbʊɡəˈzɑːleɪ/ ah-buu-gə-ZAH-lay; Levantine Arabic pronunciation: [ˌʔa.buː ʁaˈzaːle]) (born March 24, 1999), known professionally as Kat Abughazaleh, is an American journalist and social media influencer. Abughazaleh rose to prominence while working at Media Matters for America, where she gained popularity for her criticism of Fox News personality Tucker Carlson. Abughazaleh's writing has been published by Mother Jones and The New Republic. A progressive and democratic socialist member of the Democratic Party, she was a candidate for the 2026 United States House of Representatives primary election in Illinois's 9th congressional district, placing second behind Evanston mayor Daniel Biss.

== Early life and education ==
Katherine Abughazaleh was born on March 24, 1999, in Dallas, Texas, to a Palestinian American father and an American mother. Her maternal grandmother, Taffy Goldsmith (née Merrill), was a prominent Texas Republican for four decades, working on John Tower's campaign for the Senate in the early 1960s, and serving as president of the Texas Federation of Republican Women in 2004 and 2005. Her paternal grandfather, Taher Abughazaleh, was from Jerusalem; Abughazaleh says that her grandparents had to flee to Kuwait during the Nakba.

Taher Abughazaleh visited the U.S. to study at Riverside City College in Riverside, California, and George Williams College in Chicago, Illinois, in the 1950s and 1960s, and at one point he worked in Chicago providing mandated oversight concerning Mayor Richard J. Daley. He later worked with Kuwaiti real estate investors and eventually settled in Dallas after periods living outside the U.S. According to Katherine, her father Aladin Abughazaleh immigrated to the U.S. as a child and initially lived in Chicago. Aladin founded a commodity trading advisor performance platform. He also founded a data processing company that became a fund of hedge funds administrator, and was later acquired by BNY Mellon.

Abughazaleh describes her parents as Reagan Republicans. She was a Republican Party supporter throughout her teens, writing an editorial in her student newspaper endorsing Marco Rubio in the 2016 Republican primary while at Salpointe Catholic High School. As a teenager, she considered joining the military, hoping to attend the Air Force Academy or West Point. She attended private schools with classmates from high-income families until her sophomore year of high school, and has credited her family's move to Tucson, Arizona, when she was 16 for sparking her change in political views. She has said that in Tucson she attended a school with many undocumented and low-income students, and that "the bootstrap myth just shattered before my eyes".

From 2014 to 2017, she served on the board of directors of an Arizona Girl Scouts organization.

She attended George Washington University in Washington, D.C., aiming to work in journalism or the Foreign Service. At GWU, she wrote and made videos for the student newspaper, performed stand-up comedy, and studied international security and journalism. While a student, she remained registered as a Dallas voter to have "a lot more voting power" than she would as a D.C. resident. She graduated in 2020 with a bachelor's degree in international affairs, and looked for jobs in progressive politics. According to Abughazaleh, she has been independent of financial support from her family since she was 20.

== Career ==
=== Early career ===
In the early 2020s, Abughazaleh worked part-time as a bartender in Washington, D.C., alongside her media analysis work. In August 2022, she drank a spiked drink, causing her to black out and then to consult a doctor. Her tweets about the experience were shared and liked hundreds of thousands of times, and spurred news coverage on symptoms that indicate a person has been nonconsensually drugged.

=== Media Matters for America ===
By 2023, Abughazaleh had become a senior video producer for Media Matters for America. She covered Fox News content, including Tucker Carlson's show on that network at the time. This was reflected in the self-description of her Twitter profile, "I watch Tucker Carlson so you don't have to." According to Abughazaleh, her work analyzed "how Fox informs the right-wing political apparatus that shows what's being introduced into the mainstream," such as transphobia and attacks on DEI policies. In January 2023, she started a TikTok account, where she covered Carlson and his show. Within about four months, she had 130,000 followers, and several of her videos have reached 1 million views. By April 2023, some of her posts on Twitter, where she had more than 182,000 followers, had gone viral, and she faced online harassment by conservative commentators and right-wing users. In one instance, she collated screenshots of the harassing messages, creating a "visual aid" to illustrate what she and other prominent women in media experience frequently. While at Media Matters, Abughazaleh served as SEIU Local 500 union representative.

In May 2024, The New Republic named Abughazaleh on a list of "25 Political Influencers to Watch in 2024". That same month, Abughazaleh and 11 colleagues were laid off from Media Matters following a lawsuit by Elon Musk.

=== Independent media and political analyst ===
By July 2024, Abughazaleh had nearly 500,000 social media followers across TikTok, Twitter, and Instagram. On July 24, 2024, the progressive magazine Mother Jones announced that they hired Abughazaleh as a video creator to produce content on democracy, far-right media, disinformation, and radicalization. She also joined the media outlet Zeteo to produce videos countering right-wing narratives.

The Democratic National Convention invited Abughazaleh as one of several content creators to cover the August 2024 convention. While at the DNC, she participated in an Uncommitted sit-in, though she says she was not a member of the Uncommitted movement. She also interviewed Ro Khanna about the Democrats' Middle East policy. Abughazaleh said during the convention that she "honestly was shocked" and "appalled" at how little Kamala Harris's acceptance speech addressed Gaza and Palestinian concerns, and later characterized Democratic leaders' communications about the issue as "not just wrong but dumb" because "a ceasefire—a permanent ceasefire—is wildly popular, and it makes no sense to sacrifice all of these votes".

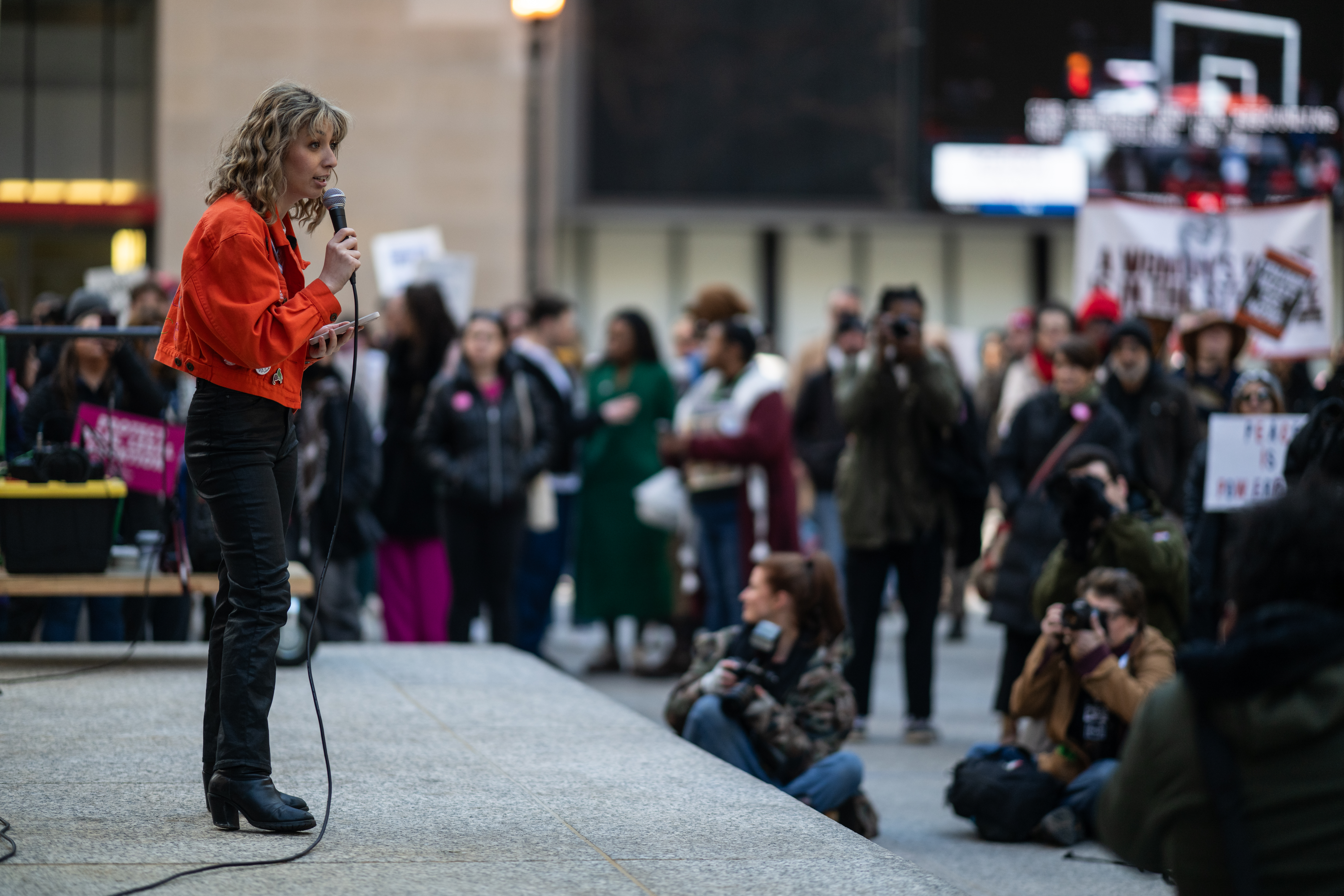
Abughazaleh at the 2026 International Women's Day march in Chicago

Politico highlighted her prominence on TikTok in September 2024, predicting her account would be among those playing "an outsized role in the last 50 days of the presidential race". Analyzing the election results, she wrote for The New Republic that "[i]deally, a new party (or several!) would emerge" from the Democratic Party's failure, but "in the interim [...] new blood, motivated by radical change rather than stagnant power, needs to storm [the] ineffective gerontocracy" of the party.

Abughazaleh was nominated for a 2025 Webby Award in the "News & Politics: Creators" category for her coverage of the far right.

=== 2026 U.S. House campaign ===
==== Launch ====
On March 24, 2025, Abughazaleh announced that she would enter the Democratic primary election for Illinois's 9th congressional district seat, which has been held by Jan Schakowsky, a Democrat and a member of the Congressional Progressive Caucus, since 1999. At that time, Schakowsky had not yet announced whether she would seek re-election in 2026. Abughazaleh says she decided to run following Trump's second inauguration, in response to Democrats "clapping politely" and Democratic leadership's "culture of giving up". She also said she chose to run because Schakowsky, like many incumbent Democrats in safe districts, had not faced a primary challenger for many years.

Shortly after announcing her run, Abughazaleh stated that she was attempting "a new type of campaign". Abughazaleh said that the campaign would reject corporate donations and "the influence of the ultra-wealthy", and instead rely on grassroots donors and free public events, and work with mutual aid groups and local businesses. For example, the entry fee for her campaign launch was a box of sanitary products, which were donated to a Chicago nonprofit for distribution among low-income communities. Her other campaign events have included a knitting circle at a bar in Evanston. Abughazaleh stated her campaign intended to spend its funds on "trying to help meet people's material needs" and informational services such as "know your rights" wallet cards, as well as local public service projects that also serve as "office hours", such as beach and neighborhood cleanups. She contrasted her strategy with "a bunch of bullshit ads that are produced by consultants who haven't won an election since the 90s". Abughazaleh's campaign has been described in reporting as relying heavily on social media engagement and small-donor fundraising, with an emphasis on digital outreach and grassroots organizing rather than traditional consultant-driven campaign structures.

If elected, Abughazaleh would have been the youngest woman, the first Gen Z woman, and the second Palestinian-American woman (after Rashida Tlaib) ever elected to Congress.

The campaign's Federal Election Commission filing stated that the first week's contributions totaled over $378,000, none from PACs, with an average contribution of approximately $32. Her campaign in the first quarter of 2025 outraised Schakowsky's. In mid-April, local high school teacher David Abrevaya announced that he was considering running in the primary as well.

==== Reactions ====
News organizations in Illinois nationally and internationally covered Abughazaleh's announcement and subsequent campaign. Politico cited Bernie Sanders who encouraged progressives to run as independent candidates in the light of declining popularity of the party, and The Washington Post noted the possibility of her campaign being part of an anti-incumbent movement akin to the Tea Party. News coverage of Abughazaleh's use of digital media, including Bluesky (rather than Musk's X), predicted her skills would help her appeal to younger voters. Coverage also compared her to other younger candidates (including several new media "stars") with progressive political stances who are seeking major US political offices, such as Zohran Mamdani, Jake Rakov, George Hornedo, Saikat Chakrabarti, Elijah Manley, Mallory McMorrow, and Deja Foxx, and placed her in Alexandria Ocasio-Cortez's camp of "younger, energetic, left-leaning Democrats" who are "blunt about Democratic errors and missteps." The editorial board of the Chicago Tribune castigated Abughazaleh, and other Democrats, for using profanity in public statements, admonishing them not to stoop to Trump's level and "debase American politics even further."

At the time of her announcement, Abughazaleh did not live in Illinois's 9th congressional district, having only registered to vote in Illinois's 7th congressional district a month before her announcement; she did subsequently move to the district. House Representatives are legally required to be residents of the state they represent in Congress, but are not required to live in the same district within that state. Abughazaleh's initial nonresident status in the district, and relatively short duration as a Chicago resident, drew criticism. Local politics commentator Eric Zorn predicted that, even if Schakowsky chose not to run for re-election, local Democrats will "get behind a more established candidate with better local bona fides and greater experience in government" rather than "a very young candidate easily labeled a carpetbagger". In 2025, Abughazaleh stated that she and her partner had already been planning to move into the district when moving to Chicago on short notice the previous year for his job (before she had considered running for Congress), that they live "one bus stop" from the 9th district, which she claims is gerrymandered, and that they planned to move into the district during summer 2025, as soon as they could break their lease on their existing home.

==== Subsequent events ====
In early May, Schakowsky announced that she would retire at the conclusion of her term in 2026. Abughazaleh released a statement which thanked Schakowsky for her tenure in Congress, and praised Schakowsky as having been supportive of Palestinian rights. After Schakowsky's announcement, state Senator Laura Fine and Evanston Mayor Daniel Biss (a former state senator and the 2018 Democratic gubernatorial primary runner-up) each announced candidacies for the district. Several additional candidates declared their intention to run; as of mid-July, the field totaled twelve.

A mid-May federal financial disclosure from Abughazaleh's campaign reported that, before launching her candidacy, she ceased paid journalism work and demonetized her past and current YouTube and TikTok videos. According to Abughazaleh, she did so to avoid conflicts of interest and to avoid monetizing campaign-related social media posts.

Abughazaleh condemned the killing of two Israeli Embassy workers in Washington, D.C. with a statement that "Murdering people for their nationality is abhorrent." She similarly condemned the 2025 Boulder fire attack, saying, "I am a Palestinian person and I do not want senseless acts of terror committed in my name." Abughazaleh said in late May that she had hired private security after a visitor repeatedly vandalized her campaign office, and after she was accused by a Republican candidate of supporting Hezbollah.

A mid-June poll of likely Democratic voters in the district found Abughazaleh coming second at 10%, the front-runner being Biss at 17%.

==== Final months ====
Federal Election Commission campaign finance filings for the period up through December 31, 2025 show Abughazaleh led in fundraising with $2.7 million raised, with Biss and Fine the next most with each just below $2 million. In early 2025, super PACs paid for television and mailed advertisements criticizing Abughazaleh, leading to concerns about the role of "dark money" in the election.

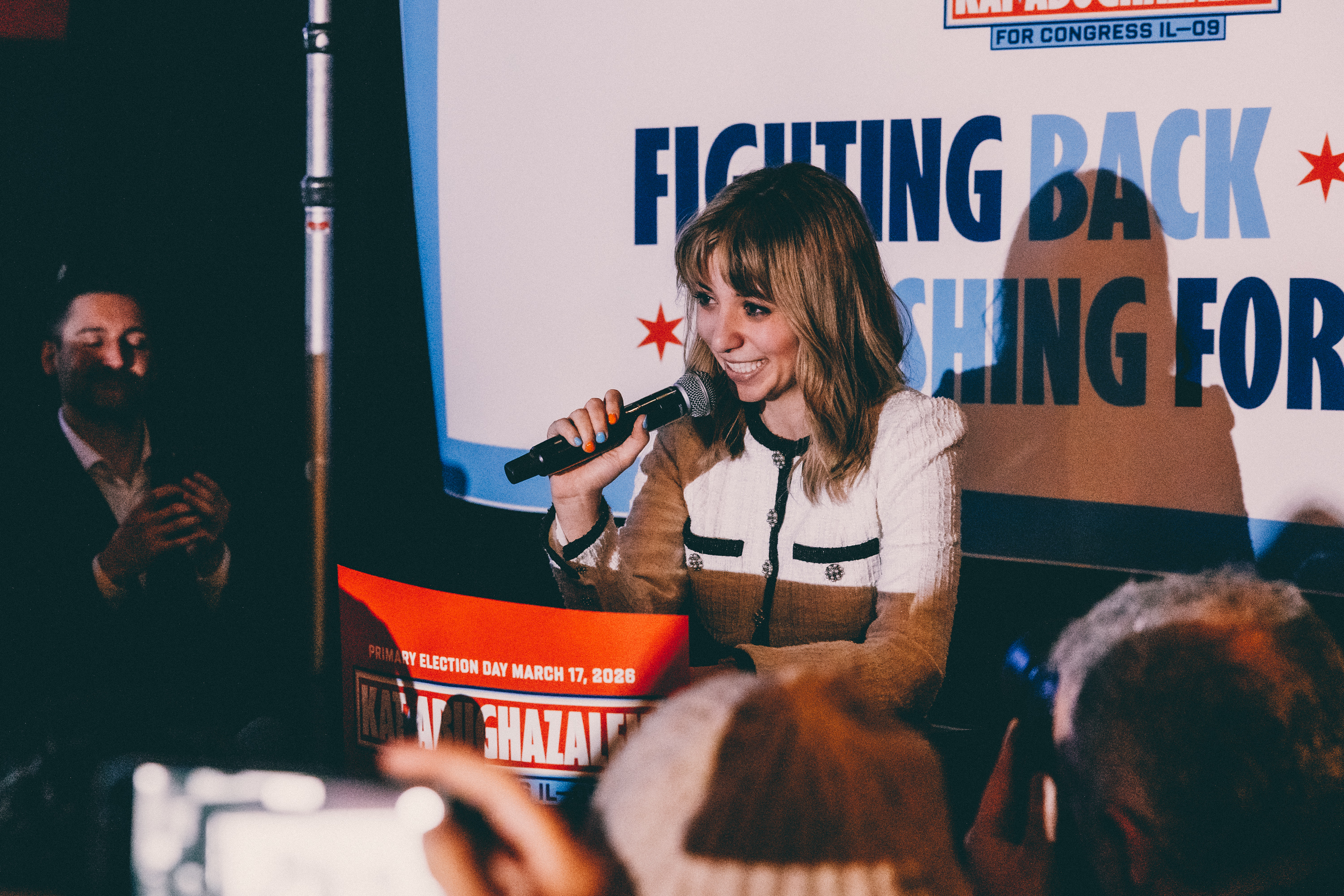
Abughazaleh speaking to supporters on election night (March 17, 2026).

In February, Abughazaleh picked up endorsements from prominent progressives, including Rep. Ro Khanna, Justice Democrats as well as Peace, Accountability, and Leadership PAC, a group that formed to support candidates advocating for Palestine. Abughazaleh was also endorsed in the days leading up to the election by Rep. Ilhan Omar, Rep. Rashida Tlaib, and former Rep. Jamaal Bowman.

After early voting began, journalist Brandy Zadrozny reported that a secretive group had approached influencers offering to pay them to make posts and videos questioning Abughazaleh's credibility.

Biss won the primary election, securing 29.5% of the vote to Abughazaleh's 26%. He led the polls in the portions of Cook County and Lake County, while Abughazaleh placed first in the portion of McHenry County.

Conceding before supporters in Andersonville, Abughazaleh said her campaign had pushed its opponents to the left and toward a more confrontational posture against the Trump administration.

=== Broadview ICE Facility incident and subsequent indictment ===
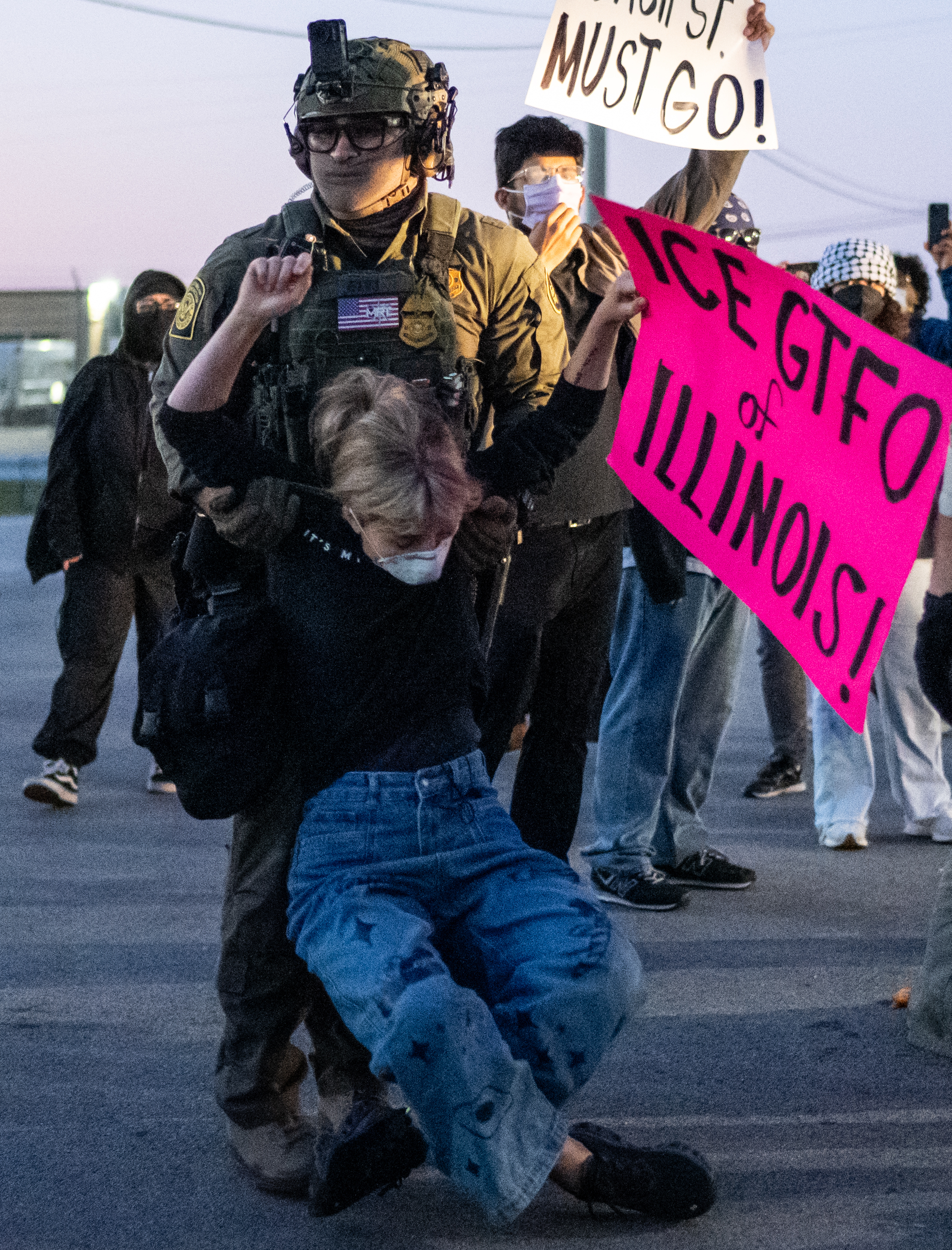
Abughazaleh being dragged or lifted by a U.S. Customs and Border Protection officer during a protest outside the Broadview ICE Facility on September 19, 2025

In September 2025, in an incident that was recorded on video and posted on social media, Abughazaleh was thrown to the ground by an ICE agent during a protest at an ICE detention facility in Broadview, Illinois, that was also attended by her primary opponents Bushra Amiwala and Daniel Biss. She later told MSNBC that she suffered minor injuries from the incident. Abughazaleh was indicted by the United States Department of Justice for her role in the protest in October 2025. The indictment alleged that she "physically hindered and impeded" a federal agent. The group that Abughazaleh was with was accused of banging against an official ICE vehicle, breaking one of its mirrors, and scratching the word "PIG" into it. She called the indictment a political prosecution and an attack on First Amendment rights. Abughazaleh and her five co-defendants came to be known as the Broadview Six.

In May 2026, days before the case was set to go to trial, federal prosecutors dismissed with prejudice all charges against Abughazaleh and her co-defendants. The dismissal followed a closed-door hearing over redacted grand jury transcripts. Defense attorney Chris Parente said that during the hearing, the judge summarized multiple problems with the prosecution's grand jury actions, such as removing jurors who did not think that the defendants' actions merited indictment, and failing to disclose to the defense that the first grand jury who heard the case returned a no true bill. Parente added that he would move for sanctions, so the defendants could recover their attorney's fees.

=== Community organizing and mutual aid ===
Following her unsuccessful electoral campaign, Abughazaleh announced that she would remain active as a community organizer in Chicago and that her former campaign headquarters in the Rogers Park neighborhood would stay open as a mutual aid hub distributing food, clothing and other goods, and hosting free community events such as film screenings, game nights and knitting circles.

=== KAPOW ===
In April 2026, Abughazaleh announced a new organization, KAPOW, under the slogan "Turning Campaigns Into Community". KAPOW's stated purpose is to scale the model used by Abughazaleh's campaign, in which mutual aid and direct community action were incorporated into electoral organizing, and to make that model available to insurgent Democratic candidates in "purple and progressive races all over the Midwest". KAPOW partnered with Common Power, a Seattle-based nonprofit that mobilizes political volunteers and that had sent canvassers into the 9th District during the primary. Abughazaleh argued that campaigns routinely allow the infrastructure and communities they build to dissolve once an election ends.

== Political positions ==
Abughazaleh identifies as a progressive and a democratic socialist. Abughazaleh's platform aligns with the progressive wing of the Democratic Party. She favors expanding government support for childcare, universal preschool, and Medicare for All.

She is a supporter of LGBTQ and transgender rights, as well as the Green New Deal. Abughazaleh favors increased regulations on artificial intelligence.

Abughazaleh is a staunch opponent of Donald Trump, and has spoken out against policies of his first and second presidencies. She favors Senator Jon Ossoff's desire to impeach Trump, calling Senate Minority Leader Chuck Schumer's reluctance "cowardice". She criticized the Liberation Day tariffs, which she deemed regressive and argued would "affect all of us that aren't billionaires". Abughazaleh is against proposed changes to voter registration laws in the Safeguard American Voter Eligibility Act, saying that it would prevent women from exercising their right to vote if they chose not to retain their maiden names after marriage.

Abughazaleh has criticized Israel's role in the Gaza war, saying, "War crimes are a bad thing no matter who commits them. No matter who they're being committed against." She has called for "the immediate release of all hostages held in Gaza and a permanent ceasefire that sets the stage for peace and reconciliation between Israelis and Palestinians," and aims to strengthen the wording and enforcement of the Leahy Law regarding the U.S.'s alliance with Israel. Illinois's 9th congressional district is home to a sizable Jewish population, and some political commentators historically considered it the de facto "Jewish seat" in the Illinois congressional delegation. Both Biss and Fine are Jewish. Stances on Israel differentiate the contenders; opponents label Abughazaleh "anti-Israel" due to her outspoken criticism of Israel's conduct in the Gaza war. According to Jewish Insider, Abughazaleh has used the slogan "from the river to the sea" and described the Netanyahu government as a "genocidal apartheid regime". She states that "from the river to the sea" is a peaceful call for freedom and equality, not a call for violence. (Note: According to the Associated Press, many pro-Palestinian activists say the phrase is "a call for peace and equality" after decades of Israeli military rule in the occupied Palestinian territories, while many Jews see it as a demand for the destruction of Israel.)

Abughazaleh approves of Schakowsky's voting record, but calls for electing "representatives who face the same challenges we do" (such as high rents and the high cost of health insurance) and have had similar experiences (such as school shooting drills). Abughazaleh also criticizes Schakowsky's role in Democratic leadership: "if your party is not aligning with your values, which, based on her voting record, it isn't, you need to be more outspoken" in opposing the current administration, such as by employing "any legislative or parliamentary procedure they can use to gum up the works" as well as physically "putting their bodies between Elon Musk and any government building". In her view, "you have people like Schakowsky who have done a lot more than other people in Congress—but it's still not working" because "the Democratic Party has prioritized decorum and its own structure over actually representing democracy". In a text message from her campaign, Abughazaleh accused Schakowsky of accepting donations from organizations that excuse "Israeli aggression", and promised to vote against US military aid to Israel as long as the Gaza war continued.

In her initial campaign announcement, Abughazaleh explained that she "[did not] think that the Democratic Party right now [was] doing enough". News outlets and Abughazaleh herself connected her campaign with the "widespread frustration" with the Democratic Party's leadership among its progressive members, particularly after Donald Trump's rise. She also criticized the party for "just continually not listening to voters, not considering any other solutions ... There's a lot of talk about being a big tent, but it feels like they're only extending that tent to the right, and they're kicking the rest of us out".

Abughazaleh stated that she does not intend to be a career politician and is not interested in staying in office indefinitely, should she win. She has said that, to give the next generation a chance to lead, she would want to serve no more than five terms (ten years).

== Personal life ==
Abughazaleh lived in Washington, D.C., until she and her partner, Ben Collins, moved to Chicago, Illinois, in July 2024. The move was prompted by Collins's new role as CEO of Global Tetrahedron, the company that owns the satirical newspaper The Onion, which is headquartered in Chicago. She has since said that they moved on very short notice. Abughazaleh is openly bisexual. In January 2026 after missing a virtual forum with Indivisible Edgewater, Abughazaleh revealed in a statement to social media that she has narcolepsy.

== Electoral results ==
2026 U.S. House of Representatives, Illinois's 9th Congressional District - Democratic primary results
Party	Candidate	Votes	%
	Daniel Biss	36,690	29.5
	Kat Abughazaleh	32,233	26.0
	Laura Fine	25,262	20.3
	Mike Simmons	8,647	7.0
	Phil Andrew	7,709	6.2
	Bushra Amiwala	6,240	5.0
	Hoan Huynh	2,174	1.8
	Patricia Brown	1,600	1.3
	Jeff Cohen	1,041	0.8
	Justin Ford	748	0.6
	Bethany Johnson	613	0.5
	Sam Polan	508	0.4
	Howard Rosenblum	296	0.2
	Nick Pyati	227	0.2
	Mark Fredrickson	213	0.2
Total votes		124,201	100.0

== See also ==
- 2026 United States House of Representatives elections in Illinois
