= Laura Fine =

American politician (born 1966)

- Fine in 2018

Member of the Illinois Senate from the 9th district
- Incumbent
- Assumed office January 6, 2019
- Preceded by: Daniel Biss

Member of the Illinois House of Representatives from the 17th district
- In office January 8, 2013 – January 6, 2019
- Preceded by: Daniel Biss
- Succeeded by: Jennifer Gong-Gershowitz

Personal details
- Born: December 13, 1966 (age 59) Skokie, Illinois, U.S.
- Party: Democratic
- Spouse: Michael
- Children: 2
- Education: Indiana University, Bloomington (BA); Northeastern Illinois University (MA)

Laura Fine (born December 13, 1966) is an American politician who has served as a member of the Illinois Senate from the 9th district since 2019, representing parts of Chicago and several North Shore suburbs in Cook County. A member of the Democratic Party, she previously represented the 17th district in the Illinois House of Representatives from 2013 to 2019. In 2025, Fine announced her candidacy for Illinois's 9th congressional district in the United States House of Representatives and sought to succeed Representative Jan Schakowsky in the 2026 U.S. House elections, placing third behind Evanston mayor Daniel Biss and social media influencer Kat Abughazaleh.

== Early life and education ==
Fine grew up in Glenview, Illinois in a Jewish household. She graduated from Glenbrook South High School and later attended Indiana University, graduating in 1985 with a B.A. in telecommunications. Fine received a master's degree in political science from Northeastern Illinois University.

== Political career ==
Fine represented the 17th district of the Illinois House of Representatives from 2013 to 2019 and served as Northfield Township Clerk from 2009 to 2012.

On July 28, 2017, Fine announced her intention to run for the state senate seat being vacated by Daniel Biss. After running unopposed in the primary, Fine won the 2018 general election. She took office on January 6, 2019.

Fine is a member of the following Illinois Senate committees:

- Behavioral and Mental Health (Chair)
- Insurance (Vice-chair)
- Environment and Conservation
- Health and Human Services
- Judiciary
- Public Health
- Worker's Compensation

Fine serves as the chair of the Great Lakes-St. Lawrence Legislative Caucus, whose mission is to create policies to restore and protect the Great Lakes and the St. Lawrence River basin.

=== 2026 congressional campaign ===
On May 6, 2025, Fine announced that she would run for the U.S. House of Representatives in Illinois's 9th congressional district, seeking to succeed retiring incumbent Jan Schakowsky. The field also included Biss, now mayor of Evanston; journalist and social media influencer Kat Abughazaleh; former FBI agent Phil Andrew; and eleven other candidates. The Chicago Tribune said of the race that "what might once have been a largely local affair has become a fight about the political party’s direction as much as constituent issues in the district."

Fine received over 100 endorsements from political figures and organizations, including congressman Brad Schneider (IL-10), former congresswoman Cheri Bustos, the left-leaning PAC Elect Democratic Women, the Daily Herald, and the Chicago Tribune. Fine did not seek AIPAC's endorsement, although individual AIPAC donors, contributed to her campaign. AIPAC board President Michael Tuchin hosted a fundraiser on her behalf, and a Super PAC associated with AIPAC spent over a million dollars in ads supporting her campaign. A few weeks before the March 17 primary, Biss and Fine began trading accusations over campaign finance misconduct, and both campaigns announced that surrogates filed complaints against the other with the Federal Election Commission (FEC).

According to The Daily Northwestern, "In her congressional run, Fine has most expounded upon her achievements in the healthcare and insurance sectors, which she claimed have made Illinois one of the most 'consumer-friendly' states."

Daniel Biss won the primary election, securing 29.6% of the vote in the field of 15 candidates. Fine finished in third.

== Political positions ==
=== Environment ===
In March 2025, Fine introduced legislation that would ban styrofoam containers from being sold in the state beginning in 2030. The bill makes an exception for egg cartons, and manufacturers will still be able to export the containers outside of Illinois. As of March 2026, this bill had not yet become law. Fine also sponsored legislation in 2023 to phase out "forever chemicals" from firefighting foam. She told The Loyola Phoenix that she sees a connection between green energy adoption and union jobs, and that she would work towards fully transitioning the United States away from fossil fuels in the future.

=== LGBT rights ===
In 2021, Fine introduced legislation that would make it easier for transgender people to change the gender designation on their birth certificates. A different version of this bill was signed into law in 2023. Fine said she opposes federal legislation to ban gender-affirming care for children.

=== Israel ===
Jewish Insider described her political platform as being strongly pro-Israel. In a position paper obtained by the news outlet, Fine said Israel is “more than just a strategic ally, it is a beacon of democracy in one of the world’s most volatile regions.” Additionally, she said she "fully support[s] the current portfolio of U.S. security assistance to Israel, including the $3.8 billion annual commitment [...], which includes critical funding for weapons systems." She added that she does “not support additional conditions on aid to Israel, militarily or otherwise.” Fine told The Loyola Phoenix that Israel hasn't committed genocide in Gaza, but has committed unacceptable collective punishment. She also said that she supports a two-state solution. Fine told The Daily Northwestern that she was a longtime participant in Hands of Peace, an interfaith nonprofit connecting Israeli, Palestinian and American youth for extensive dialogue programs over the summer, and that this was "crucial to her belief in a peaceful future for Israelis and Palestinians."

=== Immigration ===
Fine told the Daily Herald that ICE should be abolished and referred to its agents as "Trump’s private army." She also introduced legislation in the Illinois Senate that would ban ICE agents from becoming law enforcement officers in Illinois. As of March 2026, it had not yet received a vote.

=== Healthcare ===
The Loyola Phoenix reported that Fine supports legal access to abortion. In 2023, she sponsored a bill that gave Illinois insurance regulators authority to review health insurance rate changes. Fine said this would "make the pricing of health insurance more transparent to consumers and give regulators the ability to determine whether consumers are being overcharged." Fine told the Chicago Sun-Times that she supports programs like Medicare for All. She also told The Daily Northwestern that her "next ambition is to lay the groundwork for a Medicare for All single-payer national health insurance system."

Fine played a role in establishing and chairing the Illinois Senate Behavioral and Mental Health Committee during the COVID-19 pandemic. The Daily Northwestern said that the committee has helped establish mental health parity in the state, which requires insurance to cover both mental and physical health care.

=== War with Iran ===
In the position paper obtained by Jewish Insider, which was written before the start of the 2026 Iran war, Fine said she supported military action and "The stakes are too high to tolerate halfway measures." Ηοwever, after the strikes began, she released a statement saying, "Trump needed to be reined in and impeached."

=== Assyrian community ===
Fine has emphasized the significance of the Assyrian community in the district. She voiced support for the official recognition of 1915 Sayfo Genocide targeting the Syriac, Greek, and Armenian peoples. She expressed support for the return of Syriac families to their historic homeland and backed the implementation of Article 125 of the Iraqi Constitution, which guarantees administrative and cultural rights for ethnic minorities, including the establishment of a self-governing safe area in Nineveh Plains.

== Personal life ==
Fine and her husband, Michael, have two sons. She first ran for office after her husband was in a car accident and their health insurance policy was canceled. After almost facing bankruptcy, Fine studied and received an insurance license to better understand the industry behind her family's struggles.

== Electoral Results ==
2026 U.S. House of Representatives, Illinois's 9th Congressional District - Democratic primary results
Party	Candidate	Votes	%
Democratic	Daniel Biss	36,781	29.6
Democratic	Kat Abughazaleh	32,271	25.9
Democratic	Laura Fine	25,326	20.3
Democratic	Mike Simmons	8,647	7.0
Democratic	Phil Andrew	7,709	6.2
Democratic	Bushra Amiwala	6,240	5.0
Democratic	Hoan Huynh	2,174	1.8
Democratic	Patricia Brown	1,600	1.3
Democratic	Jeff Cohen	1,041	0.8
Democratic	Justin Ford	748	0.6
Democratic	Bethany Johnson	613	0.5
Democratic	Sam Polan	508	0.4
Democratic	Howard Rosenblum	296	0.2
Democratic	Nick Pyati	227	0.2
Democratic	Mark Fredrickson	213	0.2
Total votes		124,201	100.0
