= Ben Collins (reporter) =

American journalist (born 1987/88)

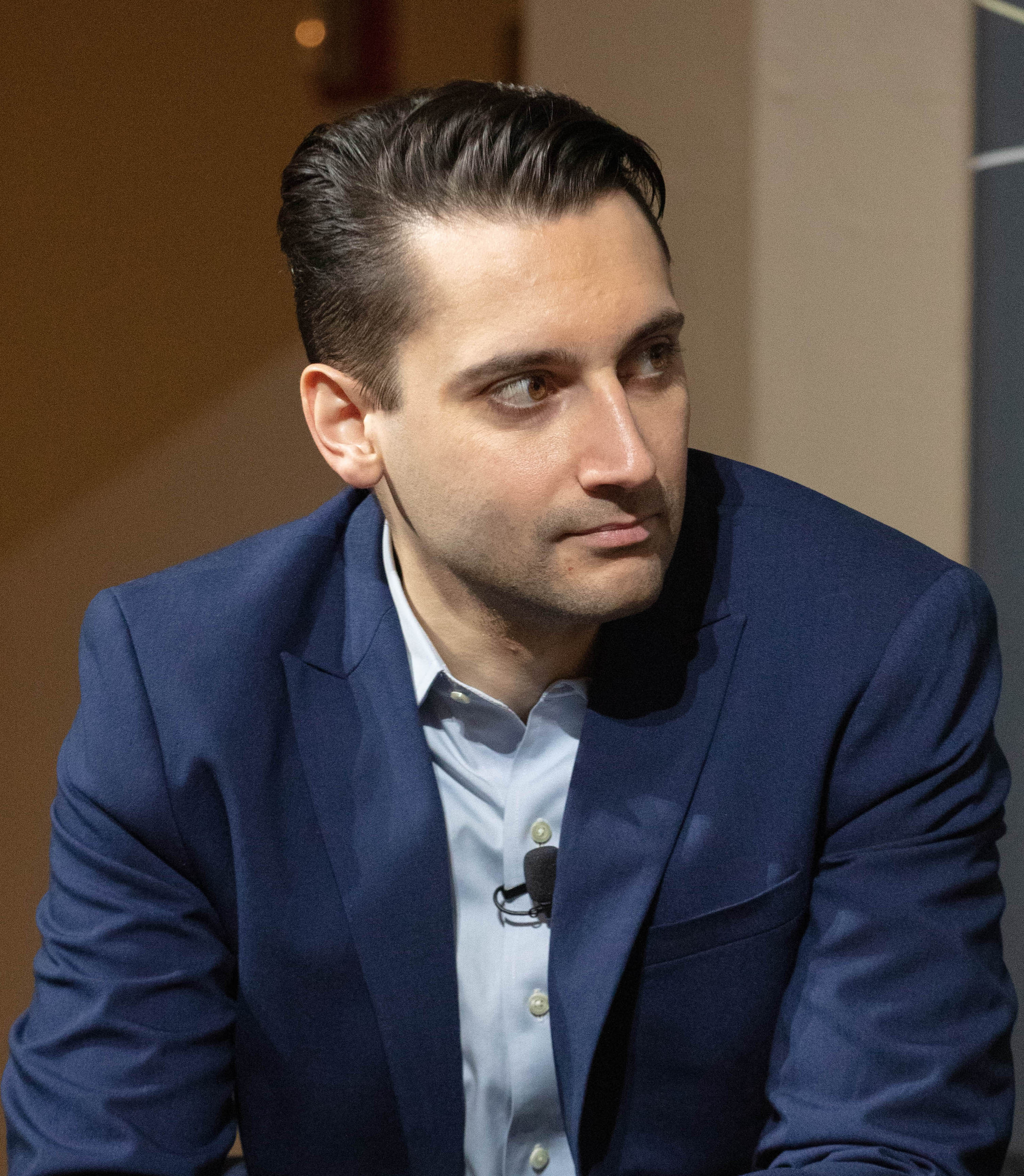
- Collins in 2022
- Born: 1987 or 1988 (age 37–38)
- Education: Emerson College (BS)
- Occupations: Businessman, journalist
- Years active: 2006–present
- Employer: Global Tetrahedron
- Organization: The Onion
- Partner: Kat Abughazaleh
- Awards: Special Recognition, Walter Cronkite Award for Excellence in Television Political Journalism

Ben Collins (born 1987/1988) is an American businessman and journalist. In 2018, he became a reporter for NBC News; he departed in 2024 to focus on writing a book. That same year he became the CEO of the media company Global Tetrahedron, which purchased the satirical news organization The Onion.

== Early life and education ==
Collins is from the U.S. state of Massachusetts, growing up in Salem and Byfield. His mother is a librarian. At age 12, he mentioned Mark Cuban in his blog; Collins's start in journalism came when Cuban came across the blog and invited him to write about sports for the Dallas Mavericks website. As a teenager, he wrote for the Mavericks site and wrote sports columns on a nationally syndicated children's website about sports.

He attended Emerson College between 2006 and 2010, graduating with a bachelor's degree in print journalism. While enrolled at Emerson, he was a music columnist for The Berkeley Beacon, the college's student newspaper, and wrote about sports for the Boston Globe and as an intern at Slam. Covering sports at Slam led him to cover pranksters publishing videos of them heckling sports analyst Stephen A. Smith, to which he attributes the start of his interest in covering media manipulation and the "weird internet". During college, he was a roommate of Chris Hurst, with whom he co-hosted a sports and humor radio show as an undergraduate.

== Professional career ==
=== Early career and Esquire ===
Following his graduation from Emerson, Collins continued to work at Slam before performing social media work for Hulu. Following his time at Hulu, Collins became a news editor of Esquire in 2013, where he remained for a year until he was hired by The Daily Beast.

=== The Daily Beast ===
Between 2014 and 2018, Collins worked in various roles for The Daily Beast as a senior news editor and technology reporter. While Collins was employed at The Daily Beast, Hurst's girlfriend Alison Parker was shot and killed on live television. Though Collins had not met Parker, the incident and its aftermath deeply affected him; he started directly contacting conspiracists who called Hurst and Parker "crisis actors" and trying (usually fruitlessly) to inform them they were mistaken. He then decided to report a beat covering online conspiracy theories and the far right.

At The Daily Beast, Collins frequently reported alongside researcher Brandy Zadrozny, who had joined the publication in 2013. When offered an opportunity to work at NBC News in March 2018, Collins accepted it on the condition that he would be allowed to bring Zadrozny along to join him.

=== NBC News ===
In 2018, Collins and Zadrozny departed The Daily Beast to join NBC News. Collins covered "disinformation, extremism and the internet" at NBC News, writing for its website and appearing on MSNBC. His and Zadrozny's coverage of QAnon and related topics while at NBC News has been cited by scholars in the field.

In December 2022, following controversial comments Collins made on social media that NBC says ran afoul of its social media standards, NBC temporarily suspended Collins from covering Elon Musk and Twitter. The National Review had criticized an October 2022 tweet by Collins about changes to Twitter under Musk potentially affecting the outcomes of the midterm elections, assessing his concern as only arising if Twitter moderation policies "might affect political outcomes in the wrong direction" and calling him "not actually interested in anything other than power". Collins's final story for NBC News, published in October 2023, covered Musk's strategy in choosing to purchase Twitter.

Collins was part of the NBC News team whose reporting on the January 6, 2021 attack on the US Capitol won an Emmy Award for Outstanding Live Breaking News. The 2023 Walter Cronkite Awards for Excellence in Television Political Journalism gave Collins "Special recognition for incisive reporting from the trenches of the information war". His memo to the judges urged fellow journalists to "be better at extolling truth — based in empathy, democracy, and human rights — than fearmongers have become at selling profitable lies." While at NBC, Collins also continued to write for Slam, wrote about conspiracists and journalistic approaches for Nieman Lab, and spoke to On the Media about Kiwi Farms.

Collins, weary of the emotional toll of covering disinformation and its effects, resigned from NBC News in January 2024 to work on writing a book "about all of the people who had manipulated our media over the last 10 years through the internet".

=== Global Tetrahedron ===
In April 2024, Collins was announced as and began his role as the CEO of Global Tetrahedron, a company that purchased the satirical website The Onion. Its name is a reference to a fictional company described in Onion publications. The purchase originated from Collins reading a January 24 Adweek report that then-owner G/O was looking to offload the magazine, among other titles, and then posting on Bluesky asking, "So uh how do we buy The Onion?" His post spurred conversation with people who then formed Global Tetrahedron and successfully purchased the property. Collins moved from New York to Chicago for the job, accompanied by his partner, Kat Abughazaleh, who later decided to pursue a local Congressional seat.

Collins later said that a reason he "tried as hard as I could to rescue" The Onion was to prevent Elon Musk from buying it, following Musk's unsuccessful attempts to buy the publication in 2014 and 2019, and to keep it from being turned into an "AI slop farm". He noted that, unlike political journalism, satire is "completely unbeholden" and "allowed to say, 'Actually, one side has really totally co-opted this conversation for political points'", pointing to transphobia as an example of an issue where satire is more equipped to "go after people in power". According to Collins, he does not attempt to influence The Onion's editorial choices: "I've never touched Onion copy. I just do businessy stuff."

As Global Tetrahedron CEO, Collins oversaw the company's attempted purchase of InfoWars, aiming to relaunch it with satire about the far right and conspiracy theorists, as well as genuine gun violence prevention information. The purchase attempt was put on hold, and eventually rejected by the federal bankruptcy court which had overseen the auction. This rejection has since been appealed and is moving through the appeals process.

Collins delivered the 2025 John H. Mitchell Lecture at the University of Michigan, in a series featuring "ethically minded lecturers from the creative industries".

== Personal life ==
Collins is in a relationship with progressive commentator and 2026 congressional candidate Kat Abughazaleh, who placed second in the Democratic primary for Illinois's 9th District in 2026.
