= Daniel Biss =

American mathematician and politician (born 1977)

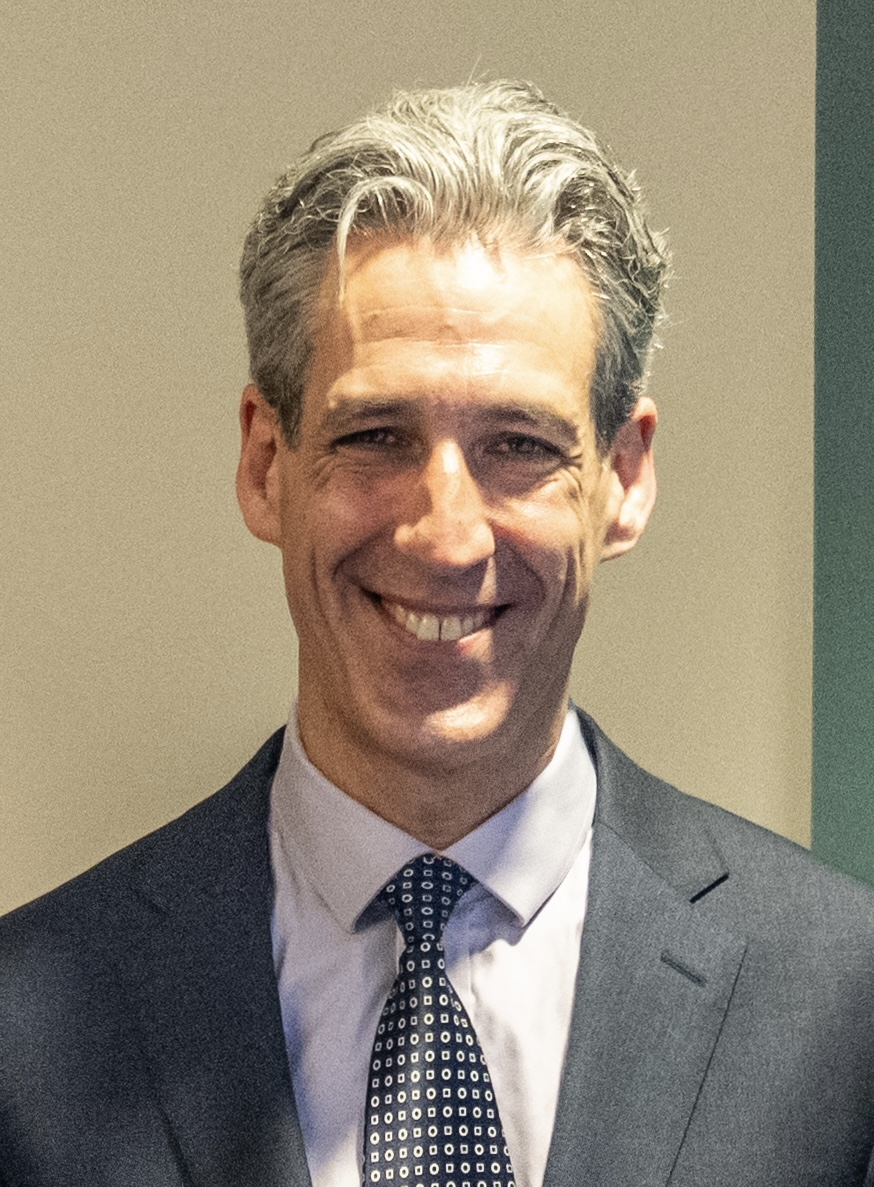
- Biss in 2026

Member-elect of the U.S. House of Representatives from Illinois's 9th district
- Assuming office January 3, 2027
- Succeeding: Jan Schakowsky

22nd Mayor of Evanston
- In office May 10, 2021 – October 18, 2026
- Preceded by: Steve Hagerty
- Succeeded by: Clare Kelly (pro tempore)

Member of the Illinois Senate from the 9th district
- In office January 8, 2013 – January 6, 2019
- Preceded by: Jeffrey Schoenberg
- Succeeded by: Laura Fine

Member of the Illinois House of Representatives from the 17th district
- In office January 12, 2011 – January 8, 2013
- Preceded by: Elizabeth Coulson
- Succeeded by: Laura Fine

Personal details
- Born: Daniel Kálmán Biss; August 27, 1977 (age 49) Akron, Ohio, U.S.
- Party: Democratic
- Spouse: Karin Steinbrueck
- Children: 2
- Relatives: Miriam Fried (mother); Jonathan Biss (brother); Raya Garbousova (grandmother)
- Education: Harvard University (BA); Massachusetts Institute of Technology (MA, PhD)
- Website: Campaign website
- Scientific career
- Fields: Algebraic topology
- Workplaces: University of Chicago
- Thesis: The Homotopy Type of the Matroid Grassmannian (2002)
- Doctoral advisor: Michael Hopkins

Daniel Kálmán Biss (born August 27, 1977) is an American mathematician and politician who is the United States representative-elect for Illinois's 9th congressional district. He served as the mayor of Evanston, Illinois, from 2021 to 2026. He is a former member of both the Illinois House of Representatives and Illinois Senate. He is a member of the Democratic Party.

Prior to pursuing a political career, Biss was an assistant professor of mathematics at the University of Chicago from 2002 to 2008. Biss began his political career by running unsuccessfully as his party's nominee for the 17th district seat in the Illinois House of Representatives in 2008. He was successful in 2010 at his second attempt at running for the Illinois House of Representatives, representing its 17th district from 2011 to 2013. In 2012, Biss was elected to the Illinois Senate, and represented its 9th district from 2013 through 2019. Biss was a candidate in the Democratic primary for governor of Illinois in the 2018 election, finishing second to JB Pritzker. In 2021, he won the election for mayor of Evanston in the city's consolidated primary.

In 2025, he announced his candidacy for Illinois's 9th congressional district in the United States House of Representatives, seeking to succeed retiring incumbent Democrat Jan Schakowsky in the 2026 midterm elections. Biss won the Democratic primary in March 2026.

== Early life and education ==
Biss was born into a Jewish Israeli family of musicians. His brother is pianist Jonathan Biss, his parents are the violinists Paul Biss and Miriam Fried, and his paternal step-grandmother was the Russian-born cellist Raya Garbousova.

Biss attended Bloomington North High School in Bloomington, Indiana, and he was a finalist in the Westinghouse Science Talent Search in 1995. He received an undergraduate degree from Harvard University, graduating summa cum laude in 1998, and an MA and Ph.D. at MIT in 2002, all in mathematics. He won the 1999 Morgan Prize for outstanding research as an undergraduate, and was a Clay Research Fellow from 2002 to 2007. His doctoral advisor was Michael J. Hopkins. He was a visiting scholar at the Institute for Advanced Study in the fall of 2003.

== Academic career ==
Prior to full-time pursuit of a political career, Biss was an assistant professor of mathematics at the University of Chicago from 2002 to 2008.

At least four of the mathematics papers that Biss published in academic journals were later discovered to contain major errors. Mathematician Nikolai Mnëv published a report in 2007 that there was a "serious flaw" in two of Biss's works published in Annals of Mathematics and Advances in Mathematics in 2003, saying "unfortunately this simple mistake destroys the main theorems of both papers". In 2008 and 2009, Biss acknowledged the flaw and published erratum reports for the two papers, thanking Mnëv for drawing his attention to the error. He and a co-author, Benson Farb, also acknowledged in 2009 that there was a "fatal error" in a paper they had published in Inventiones Mathematicae in 2006, thanking mathematicians Masatoshi Sato and Tom Church for helping to explain the problem. Another of his papers published in Topology and its Applications was formally retracted by the publisher in 2017, fifteen years after its 2002 publication, with the journal saying "This article has been retracted at the request of the Editors-in-Chief after receiving a complaint about anomalies in this paper. The editors solicited further independent reviews which indicated that the definitions in the paper are ambiguous and most results are false. The author was contacted and does not dispute these findings." The journal said they had identified twelve specific errors in the paper, but clarified that they had concluded that the paper's findings were merely inaccurate, not fraudulent. When contacted by the journal, Biss had responded saying "Thank you for writing. I am no longer in mathematics and so don't feel equipped to fully evaluate these claims. I certainly do not dispute them. If you would like to publish a retraction to that effect, that would seem to me to be an appropriate approach."

When the 2017 retraction and the previously identified errors were reported by the Chicago Sun-Times in September 2017, his campaign blamed operatives for the perceived front-runner for the Democratic Party candidate for governor of Illinois, JB Pritzker, for raising it as a political issue. The campaign said "whether it was training at MIT or the University of Chicago, Daniel has had dozens of academic papers reviewed by his peers and published. In a few cases, further research has found that the case posited in the original article didn't stand up, and he revised his findings." They referred to the raising of the issue as "silly opposition research".

In 2026, Biss admitted to an "ill-advised" consensual romantic relationship with his former undergraduate student in 2004, during his time as a postdoctoral instructor at the University of Chicago.

== Political career ==
=== Illinois House of Representatives ===
Biss ran for a seat in the Illinois State House of Representatives in 2008, losing to Republican Elizabeth Coulson in the 17th district. Starting in 2009, he then worked as a policy adviser to Pat Quinn, the Democratic governor of Illinois. He successfully ran for the same Illinois State House seat in 2010.

==== Committee assignments ====
- Appropriations – Elementary & Secondary Education
- Personnel & Pensions
- Consumer Protection
- Small Business Empowerment & Workforce Development
- International Trade & Commerce
- Bio-Technology
- Appropriations – Higher Education

=== Illinois Senate ===
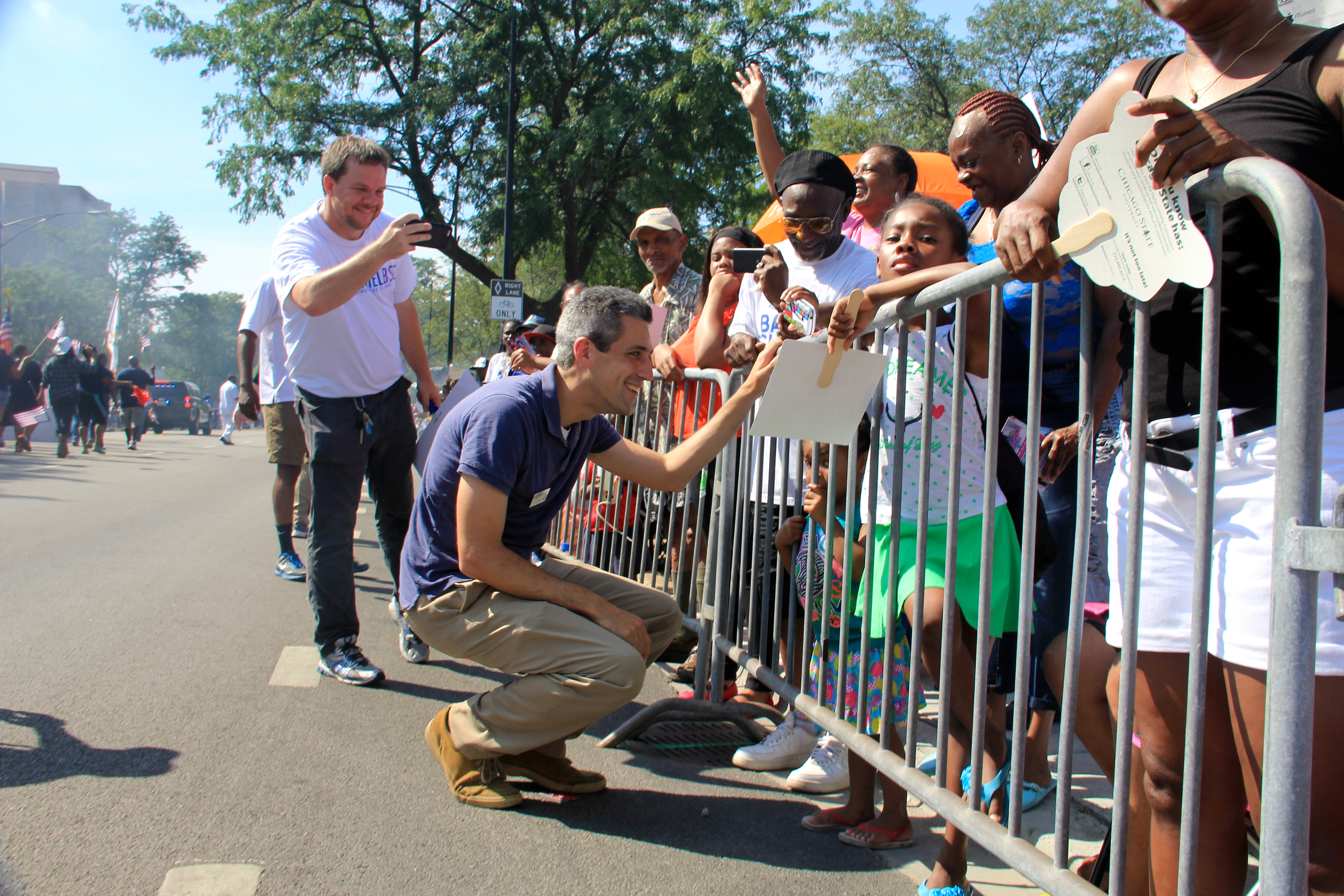
Biss at the Bud Billiken Parade in 2015

On November 10, 2011, Biss announced his intent to run for the Illinois Senate seat held by Senator Jeffrey Schoenberg, who was retiring. He won the election on November 6, 2012, receiving over 66% of the vote, and was sworn in on January 8, 2013. The district included a number of Chicago's northern suburbs, including Evanston, Glencoe, Glenview, Morton Grove, Northbrook, Northfield, Skokie, Wilmette, and Winnetka.

==== Committee assignments ====
In the 98th Illinois General Assembly Biss was a member of:

- Conference Committee on SB1. A joint House and Senate committee that sought a way to bypass the states constitutional pension protections.
- Education
- Environment
- Higher Education
- Licensed Activities & Pensions
- Local Government

==== Tenure ====
In 2013, Biss delivered a speech on the state senate floor in support of a bill to legalize same-sex marriage in Illinois. The bill passed, and was signed into law by Governor Pat Quinn.

In 2013, Biss cosponsored SB 1, a bill that significantly reduced pension plans for retired state employees in an attempt to reduce debts owed to the state retirement system due to the state's many "pension holidays". In May 2015, the Illinois Supreme Court found the law unconstitutional. In rejecting the constitutionality of SB 1, the Illinois Supreme Court stated: "These modifications to pension benefits unquestionably diminish the value of the retirement annuities the members…were promised when they joined the pension system. Accordingly, based on the plain language of the Act, these annuity-reducing provisions contravene the pension protection clause's absolute prohibition against diminishment of pension benefits and exceed the General Assembly's authority," the ruling states. Biss later said that his work on SB 1 was an error, saying, "I decided this was the least bad of the bad options. I allowed myself to think we couldn't do better." Biss later expressed support for funding higher pension payments if necessary by instituting a tax system with a graduated income tax and a tax on financial transactions.

=== 2016 Illinois comptroller campaign ===
In 2015, Biss announced his candidacy to seek the Democratic nomination in the 2016 special election for Illinois comptroller. In November 2015, Biss ended his candidacy and endorsed opponent Susana Mendoza for the Democratic nomination. Mendoza went on to win the primary and general election.

=== 2018 Illinois gubernatorial campaign ===
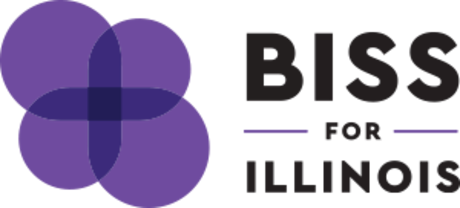
Biss 2018 gubernatorial campaign logo.

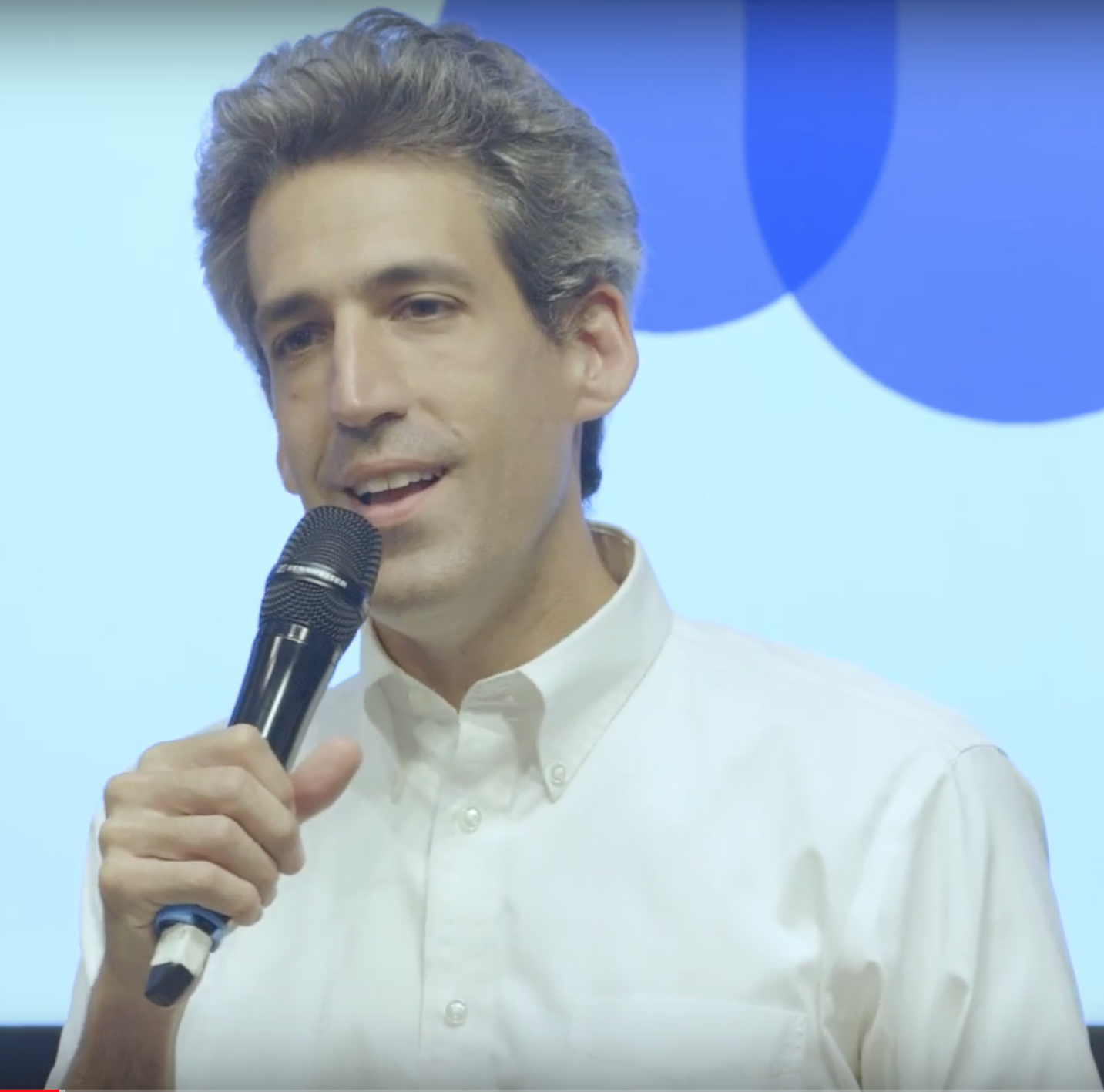
Biss speaking at a gubernatorial campaign event.

On March 20, 2017, Biss announced his candidacy for the Democratic nomination for governor of Illinois for the 2018 election. Biss's announcement was delivered during a Facebook Live video in which he criticized both incumbent governor Bruce Rauner (a Republican) and Illinois House Speaker Mike Madigan (a Democrat). Biss joined a growing field of Democratic contenders, including businessman Christopher G. Kennedy and Chicago alderman Ameya Pawar.

Biss briefly named Chicago alderman and Democratic Socialists of America member Carlos Ramirez-Rosa as his gubernatorial running mate, but dropped him from the ticket after just six days because Ramirez-Rosa had expressed some support for the BDS movement which seeks to impose comprehensive boycotts on Israel over human rights violations against Palestinians. Biss's ally, Representative Brad Schneider, had rescinded his endorsement of the ticket over his pick of Ramirez-Rosa as his running mate, though Biss denied that that affected his decision. Biss later announced his selection of Rockford-based state representative Litesa Wallace, a single mother and former social worker.

Biss was endorsed by many of his colleagues in the Illinois General Assembly, high-profile academics and activists including Nobel laureate Richard Thaler and presidential candidate Lawrence Lessig, National Nurses United, the largest organization of registered nurses in the United States, and Our Revolution, the successor organization to Bernie Sanders' 2016 presidential campaign. Biss received two-thirds of preferential votes from Illinois members of the progressive advocacy group MoveOn.org.

On March 20, 2018, Biss lost the Democratic primary to JB Pritzker. He received 26.70% of the total vote, behind Pritzker with 45.13% and ahead of Chris Kennedy with 24.37%. Biss carried two counties, McLean and Champaign.

=== Post-Senate activities ===
Having not sought reelection in the 2018 Illinois Senate election (instead running for governor), Biss was succeeded in the Illinois Senate by Laura Fine (a fellow Democrat) on January 6, 2019. On September 18, 2018, Biss announced in an email to supporters that he had accepted the position of executive director of the nonprofit Rust Belt Rising, which aims to train and support Democratic candidates in the Great Lakes states. Biss also worked as a clean energy consultant.

On August 15, 2019, Biss endorsed Elizabeth Warren for president. In January 2020, Biss was selected to be on Warren's slate of 101 potential Illinois delegates to the 2020 Democratic National Convention, but Warren suspended her campaign on March 5, before the presidential primary in Illinois on March 17.

=== Mayor of Evanston ===
==== 2021 election ====
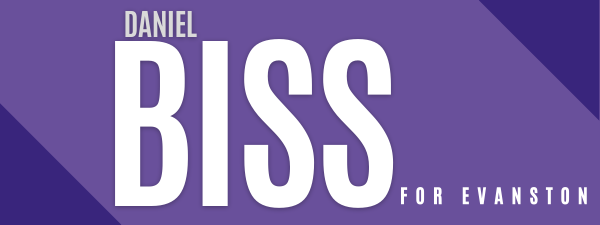
Biss's 2021 mayoral campaign logo

On September 16, 2020, Biss announced the launch of a campaign for mayor of Evanston, Illinois. On October 28, 2020, the incumbent mayor, Steve Hagerty, announced that he would not be seeking reelection.

Biss's mayoral campaign received many prominent endorsements. In December 2020, his campaign rolled out a list of 100 endorsements, including those of nine Evanston aldermen, as well as United States congresswoman Jan Schakowsky; state senator Laura Fine; state representatives Kelly Cassidy, Robyn Gabel, Jennifer Gong-Gershowitz; and Cook County commissioner Larry Suffredin. The Democratic Party of Evanston gave Biss its endorsement, as did Northside Democracy for America, the Organization for Positive Action and Leadership (OPAL), and the Community Alliance for Better Government (CABG). Biss was also endorsed by incumbent mayor Stephen Hagerty, and former mayors Elizabeth Tisdahl and Jay Lytle. On February 18, 2021, Biss's former gubernatorial primary opponent JB Pritzker, now the governor of Illinois, endorsed his candidacy for mayor.

Biss had a vast financial advantage over his two opponents. In the first three months after announcing his candidacy, he had received in excess of $100,000 in contributions. By that point, opponent Lori Keenan had only raised $3,000 and opponent Sebastian Nalls had only raised $1,000.

Biss won a landslide victory in the consolidated primary on February 23, 2021, precluding the need for a runoff election (Note: Evanston mayoral elections use a two-round system in which a nonpartisan general primary (nonpartisan preliminary election) is held when more than two candidates file to appear on the ballot. Outright election can be secured in a primary only if a candidate wins a majority of the vote. If no candidate secures a majority, the top-two finishers advance to a runoff election.) by receiving an outright majority of the vote. Biss won all but one of the city's 50 voting precincts.

==== 2025 election ====
Biss was re-elected on April 1, (Note: Since there were only two candidates, only a single round of voting was scheduled. If there had been more than two candidates, a nonpartisan general would have been held on February 25; and the April 1 local election would have been the date in which a continent runoff election would be been held between the top-two finishers if no candidate secured a majority in the primary.) receiving 62.7% against challenger Jeff Boarini. Biss received a majority of the vote in all but two of the city's 45 voting precincts. However, his victory coincided with a local election that produced a city council regarded as less receptive towards his agenda that the previous council had been, as an incumbent alderman supportive of him had lost-reelection while a top council critic of his won re-election against a Biss-endorsed challenger.

During his re-election bid, Biss again received Governor Pritzker's endorsement. He also received the endorsement of Illinois Attorney General Kwame Raoul, U.S. Senators Dick Durbin and Tammy Duckworth, Congresswoman Schakowsky, and several of the state legislators representing portions of Evanston. Boarini's campaign against Biss had touted endorsements from several city council members.

Biss strongly out-spent and out-fundraised his challenger. Biss raised over $125,000, while Boardini raised over $86,500. Biss spent over $147,300, while Boardini spent over $52,000.

==== Transition ====
Before taking office on May 10, 2021, Biss voiced a number positions on prominent political matters in the city. In March 2021, after Evanston passed a measure establishing the first expenditure of the city's first-in-the-nation municipal fund offering reparations to black residents, mayor-elect Biss released a statement in support of the approved measure. Biss also gave outgoing mayor Steve Hagerty input on the members he recommended to the city's Reparations Committee. Ahead of the April 6 Evanston municipal general election, mayor-elect Biss criticized the group Evanston Together LLC for distributing mailers which inaccurately implied that several candidates for municipal office had outright supported switching the city from a council-manager government to a strong mayor government. Biss also remarked that, while a shift in the city's form of government would not be a priority to him, he is not opposed to exploring the idea if it would remedy issues in the city.

=== 2026 congressional campaign ===
In May 2025, Biss announced his 2026 candidacy for the Illinois's 9th congressional district in the United States House of Representatives, long represented by retiring Democrat Jan Schakowsky, joining a Democratic primary field that also includes his state senate successor Laura Fine and journalist Kat Abughazaleh. On January 7, 2026, Schakowsky formally endorsed him to succeed her.

Federal Election Commission (FEC) campaign finance filings for the final quarter of 2025 showed Abughazaleh leading in fundraising with $2.7 million raised, while Biss and Fine trail her with just under $2 million each.

With only a few weeks until the March 17 primary, Biss and Fine began trading accusations over campaign finance misconduct, and both campaigns announced that surrogates filed complaints against the other with the Federal Election Commission (FEC).

On March 17, 2026, he defeated journalist Kat Abughazaleh and Laura Fine, second and third respectively, with 29.6% of the vote.

== Political positions ==
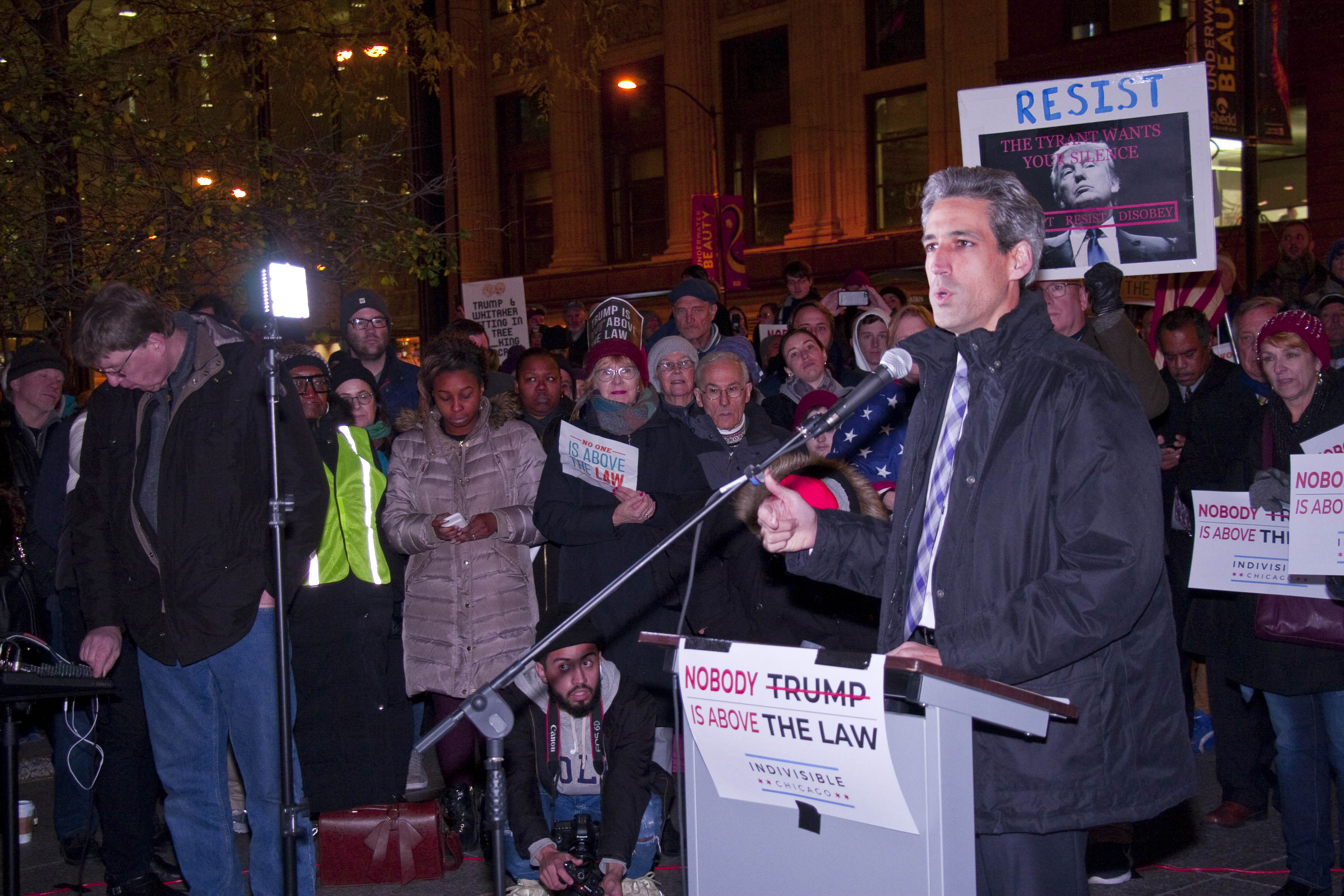
Biss speaking at a protest in 2018

=== Abortion and reproductive healthcare ===
In his response in a 2008 "Political Courage Test", Biss indicated support for legal access to abortion.

=== Election and campaign finance reform ===
As a state senator, in 2017 Biss had sponsored SB 1424, which would have created a program for state matching funds for small-donor contributions to political campaigns.In 2023 as mayor, Biss supported the passage and signed into law a municipal campaign finance reform that creates a public matching fund scheme for municipal races. This made Evanston the first city in Illinois to create a public matching scheme for local elections.

As a state senator, in 2017 Biss sponsored SB 780, a bill proposing to elect a number of statewide offices by ranked-choice ballot. He also co-sponsored SB 1933, a bill authored by State Sen. Andy Manar to allow for automatic voter registration when applying for an Illinois driver's license.

=== Environmentalism ===
In his response in a 2008 "Political Courage Test", Biss indicated support for limiting carbon emissions.

=== Education ===
In his response in a 2008 "Political Courage Test", Biss declared support for allowing Illinois high school graduates to pay in-state tuition rates at public universities regardless of immigration status, as well as state funding to raise the salaries of teachers.

=== Gun policy ===
In 2010, Biss received a 7% rating from the NRA Political Victory Fund, a group which opposes restrictions on firearms. By March 2026, this had dropped to 0%. These ratings are associated with a voting history favoring gun control.

=== Trade unions ===
Biss has expressed support for labor unions and as a candidate for state rep received campaign contributions from AFSCME. Although he later said “as a matter of politics, I can get away with really offending state employees because I don't represent that many of them.” AFSCME is one of the largest unions representing state employees.

=== Israel ===
In January 2026, Republican members of the U.S. House requested information from Biss regarding his handling of 2024 protests at Northwestern University, alleging the city declined to provide additional police support during a pro-Palestine student encampment. Tim Walberg cited documents that the university sought assistance and raised concerns about the Jewish student safety, and criticized Biss's characterization of the protests as peaceful. Biss defended his decision not to deploy Evanston police, citing public safety and respect for the right to peaceful protest. He also described the letter as "a dishonest political attack," but that he would cooperate with any congressional subpoena.

Jewish Insider reported that Biss sought AIPAC's support in the 2026 congressional primary election before campaigning less pro-Israel. Biss has denied this, instead claiming that the organization attempted to recruit him.

=== Healthcare ===
Biss supports universal health care and advocates specifically for a state-level single-payer healthcare system. In June 2017, Biss voted to reinforce the Affordable Care Act in Illinois by prohibiting insurance companies from discriminating against customers with pre-existing conditions.

Biss also supports legalizing marijuana in Illinois.

=== Housing and development ===
As mayor, Biss enacted and passed a Healthy Buildings Ordinance to curb carbon emissions through greenhouse gas emission limits.

Biss set an aim of increasing Evanston's housing density. Biss played a hands-on role in developing the city's comprehensive plan dubbed "Envision Evanston". Backlash over the initial draft due to its emphasis on expanding higher density housing a revised plan was developed led to scaling back. Biss has pushed for the city to permit the construction of four-unit apartments on larger lots zoned for single-family residences.

In 2024, Biss cast a tie-breaking council vote to allow Northwestern University to demolish and rebuild its football stadium. The new law approved a community benefits agreement where Northwestern invests approximately $10 million in the city annually for fifteen years. Biss called the privately-funded $800 million stadium project a "generational investment."

== Personal life ==
Biss is married to Karin Steinbrueck and they have two children. They moved to Evanston in 2006.

== Electoral history ==
=== Illinois House of Representatives ===
2008

2008 Illinois House of Representatives 17th district Democratic primary
Party	Candidate	Votes	%
Democratic	Daniel Biss	16,756	100
Total votes		16,756	100

2008 Illinois House of Representatives 17th district election
Party	Candidate	Votes	%
Republican	Elizabeth Coulson (incumbent)	27,540	51.48
Democratic	Daniel Biss	25,959	48.52
Total votes		53,499	100

2010

2010 Illinois House of Representatives 17th district Democratic primary
Party	Candidate	Votes	%
Democratic	Daniel K. Biss	11,636	100
Total votes		11,636	100

2010 Illinois House of Representatives 17th district election
Party	Candidate	Votes	%
Democratic	Daniel K. Biss	23,134	54.78
Republican	Hamilton Chang	19,096	45.22
Total votes		42,230	100

=== Illinois Senate ===
2012

2012 Illinois Senate 9th district Democratic primary
Party	Candidate	Votes	%
Democratic	Daniel Biss	18,583	100
Total votes		18,583	100

2012 Illinois Senate 9th district election
Party	Candidate	Votes	%
Democratic	Daniel K. Biss	68,064	66.63
Republican	Glenn Farkas	34,081	33.37
Total votes		102,145	100

2014

2014 Illinois Senate 9th district Democratic primary
Party	Candidate	Votes	%
Democratic	Daniel Biss (incumbent)	11,509	100
Total votes		11,509	100

2014 Illinois Senate 9th district election
Party	Candidate	Votes	%
Democratic	Daniel Biss (incumbent)	55,986	100
Total votes		55,986	100

=== Illinois gubernatorial ===
2018 Illinois Democratic gubernatorial primary results by county Map legend: Pritzker—70–80%; Pritzker—60–70%; Pritzker—50–60%; Pritzker—40–50%; Pritzker—30–40%; Biss—40–50%; Kennedy—30–40%; Kennedy—40–50%

2018 Illinois Democratic gubernatorial primary
Party	Candidate	Votes	%
Democratic	JB Pritzker	597,756	45.13
Democratic	Daniel Biss	353,625	26.70
Democratic	Chris Kennedy	322,730	24.37
Democratic	Tio Hardiman	21,075	1.59
Democratic	Bob Daiber	15,009	1.13
Democratic	Robert Marshall	14,353	1.08
Total votes		1,324,548	100

=== Evanston mayoral ===
2021 Evanston, Illinois mayoral election
Party	Candidate	Votes	%
Nonpartisan	Daniel Biss	7,786	72.97
Nonpartisan	Lori Keenan	1,867	17.50
Nonpartisan	Sebastian Nalls	960	9.00
Nonpartisan	Write-in	57	0.53
Total votes		10,670	100

2025 Evanston, Illinois mayoral election
Party	Candidate	Votes	%
Nonpartisan	Daniel Biss (incumbent)	11,176	62.69
Nonpartisan	Jeff Boarini	6,973	37.31
Total votes		18,689	100
Turnout		18,911	36.01% (Note: 18,911 ballots were cast in Evanston's April 1, 2025 local elections, including 222 undervotes for mayor. With 52,519 registered voters in Evanston, overall turnout among registered voters was 36.01%. Mayoral votes were cast by 35.58% of registered voters, with a further 0.42% casting recorded ballots that under voted the mayoral race.)

=== U.S. House of Representatives ===
2026 Illinois's 9th Congressional District Democratic primary results
Party	Candidate	Votes	%
Democratic	Daniel Biss	36,690	29.5
Democratic	Kat Abughazaleh	32,233	26.0
Democratic	Laura Fine	25,262	20.3
Democratic	Mike Simmons	8,647	7.0
Democratic	Phil Andrew	7,709	6.2
Democratic	Bushra Amiwala	6,240	5.0
Democratic	Hoan Huynh	2,174	1.8
Democratic	Patricia Brown	1,600	1.3
Democratic	Jeff Cohen	1,041	0.8
Democratic	Justin Ford	748	0.6
Democratic	Bethany Johnson	613	0.5
Democratic	Sam Polan	508	0.4
Democratic	Howard Rosenblum	296	0.2
Democratic	Nick Pyati	227	0.2
Democratic	Mark Fredrickson	213	0.2
Total votes		124,201	100.0

== Notes ==
Political offices
Preceded by Steve Hagerty	Mayor of Evanston; 2021–2026	Succeeded by Clare Kelly; Acting
U.S. House of Representatives
Preceded by Jan Schakowsky	Member of the U.S. House of Representatives from Illinois's 9th congressional district Taking office 2027	Elect
