= The Berkeley Beacon =

Student newspaper of Emerson College, Boston

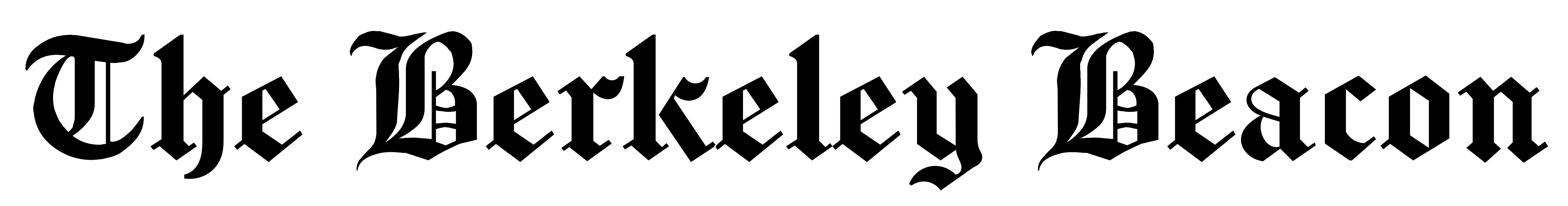
- Type: Student newspaper
- Format: Broadsheet
- Publisher: Emerson College
- Founded: February 13, 1947; 78 years ago
- Headquarters: Boston, Massachusetts, United States
- Readership: 350,000 - 400,000 web views per year
- Website: www.berkeleybeacon.com

The Berkeley Beacon is the student newspaper of Emerson College, founded in 1947. The paper is published weekly on Thursdays during the fall and spring semesters of Emerson's academic year.

In 2012, the Beacon redesigned its website, making it the first college newspaper website with a responsive design.

== History ==
The first issue of The Berkeley Beacon was published on February 1, 1947, under the direction of editor-in-chief Paul Mundt. According to lore, the paper was named after the college's location at the intersection of Berkeley Street and Beacon Street. However the name might actually refer to the famous weather beacon atop the Berkeley Building, which was completed the same year.

The Beacon has contributed to several student movements at the college, including the first student demonstration in Emerson history in 1968. It published a letter from the college president Richard Chapin decrying the Vietnam War. In 1977, an editorial in the Beacon pointed out a number of inaccuracies in a college report which was attempting to secure accreditation from the New England Association of Schools and Colleges. In 1997, the Beacon broke a story about a female student's on-campus sexual assault, which the administration had failed to address.

In 2011, the Beacon became the first college newspaper website with a responsive design, and changed from a weekly print format to a daily digital format in 2018. The website has won several Associated Collegiate Press awards after its redesign.

In April 2024, the Beacon covered the arrest of 118 student protesters during the nationwide demonstrations against the Israeli war in Gaza. Its reporting was cited by both local and national outlets.

In 2025, the Beacon was ranked the second best college newspaper in the country by The Princeton Review, finishing behind Columbia University's Daily Spectator.

== Notable alumni ==
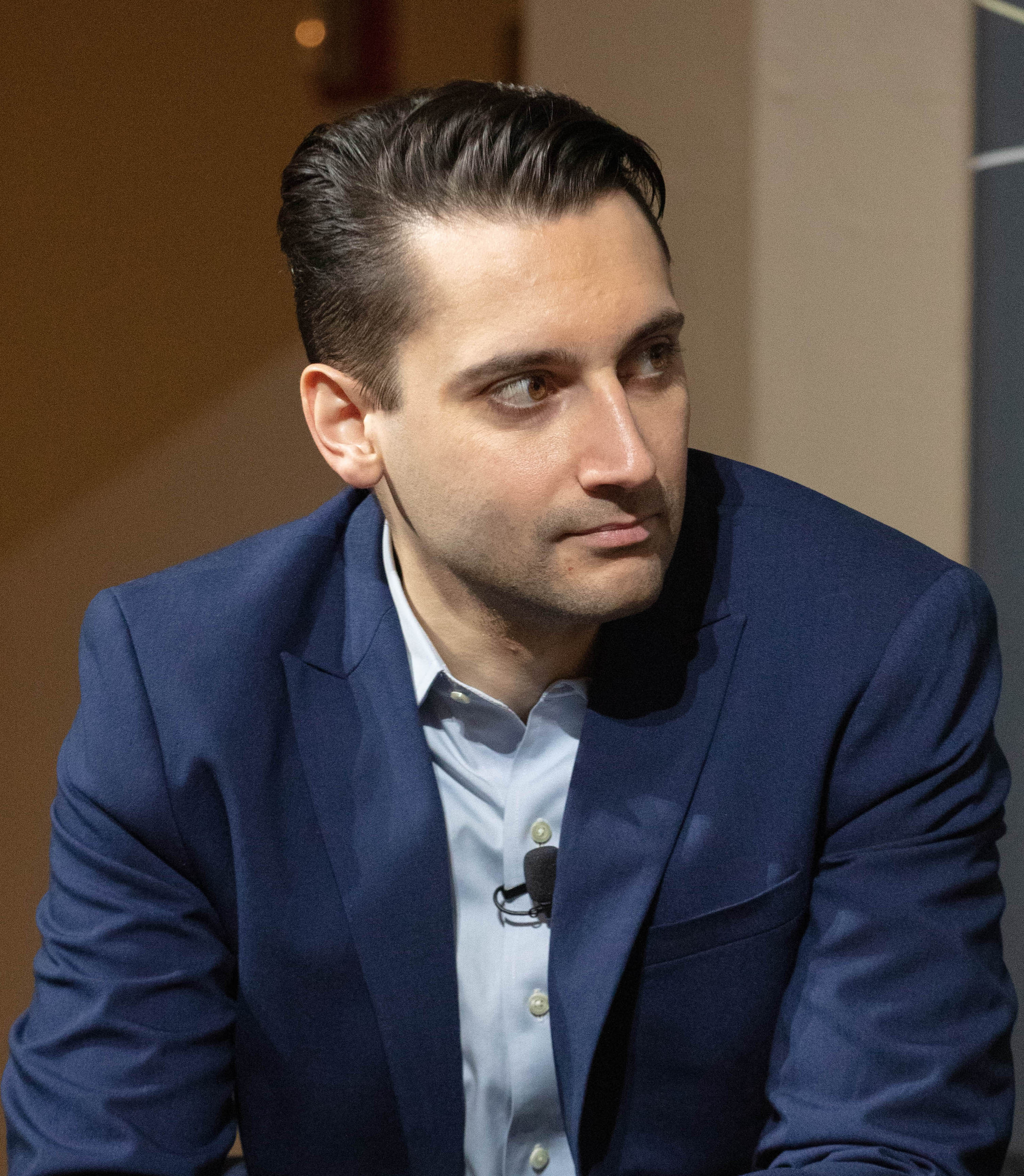
Ben Collins

- Morton Dean, television correspondent and news anchor for CBS Evening News and Good Morning America
- Ben Collins, media and disinformation reporter for NBC News
- Brendan McCarthy, investigative editor for The Boston Globe's "Spotlight" team and 2021 Pulitzer Prize winner
- Dan Bigman, former business editor of The New York Times and managing editor of Forbes
- Matt Porter, Boston Bruins beat writer for The Boston Globe
- Diti Kohli, business reporter for The Boston Globe and "Spotlight" team contributor
- Andrew Brinker, housing reporter for The Boston Globe and "Spotlight" team contributor
- Tori Bedford, Emmy-nominated reporter for WGBH Radio
- Molly Driscoll, former culture editor for The Christian Science Monitor
- Cyndi Roy Gonzalez, former communications director for Massachusetts Attorney General Maura Healey
- Nathan Hurst, political editor for C-SPAN
- Hunter Harris, lifestyle writer and podcaster, named to 2024 Forbes 30 Under 30
- Chris Van Buskirk, state house reporter for the Boston Herald
- Dylan Rossiter, publisher for consumer products State House News Service
- Parker Purifoy, labor reporter for Bloomberg Law
- Christopher McDonald, actor known for portraying Ron Troupe in Superman (2025)
