= Bushra Amiwala =

American activist and politician (born 1997)

- Bushra Amiwala speaking at a volunteer event, 2026.

Personal details
- Born: December 30, 1997 (age 28) Chicago, Illinois, U.S.
- Party: Democratic
- Spouse: Sufyaan Syed (m. 2026)
- Education: DePaul University (BS); Northwestern University (MBA)

Bushra Amiwala (born December 30, 1997) is an American activist, politician, and public speaker. As of April 2019, Amiwala was the first Gen Z woman to become an elected official in the United States. She was also the youngest Muslim elected official in the United States at the time. Amiwala has been listed in the Chicago History Museum with both of these historical accolades.

Amiwala was a Democratic candidate for the Cook County Board of Commissioners in the 2018 primary election, as a teenager. At 19, she lost to the then 16-year incumbent Larry Suffredin in the Democratic primary election on March 20, 2018, earning 14,988 votes, 35% of the vote in a three-way race. Suffredin then encouraged Amiwala to run for public office shortly after she announced her candidacy for D73.5 Board of Education, and was elected in April 2019 in a race with seven candidates, then re-elected in April 2023.

== Biography ==
Amiwala was born in Chicago and lived in the Rogers Park area until she was 10. She is the daughter of two Pakistani immigrants. Her family then moved to Skokie, Illinois, where she graduated from Niles North High School, and was on the Policy debate team, winning the national debating championship at Harvard University.

Amiwala has discussed being motivated to become politically active due to anti-immigrant and anti-Muslim sentiment in the country at the time, associated with Donald Trump. She began her political career as an intern for Republican senator Mark Kirk, and was encouraged by her field office manager to run her own campaign for the Cook County Board of Commissioners as a college freshman. She came in second in the Democratic primaries with 14,988 votes, a total of 30.6% of the vote in a three-person race.

Amiwala is an alumna of DePaul University, where she studied management information systems, with a double minor in community service studies and public policy studies, and served as the commencement speaker for her college graduating class in 2020. She studied at Kellogg School of Management, and graduated with an MBA in June 2025.

In 2019, Amiwala was elected to the SD73.5 Board of Education from Skokie Township, Illinois. She was reelected in 2023, having run unopposed. She has testified in the Illinois General Assembly on the All Faiths Act; mandating the education of contributions of religious minority groups in history.

Amiwala is a frequent public speaker and has spoken at events such as two TEDx, TEDxDePaul University and TEDxDavenport, along with institutions such as Harvard University. She was featured in a documentary called And She Could Be Next on PBS. She is also one the female candidates profiled and aided on Amazon Prime's RUN The Series. Amiwala was featured in original Hulu documentary called Our America: Women Forward.

Amiwala has hosted annual Ramadan Iftar events, which have been attended by politicians including Illinois Governor JB Pritzker. Bushra was on the Forbes 30 Under 30 list in 2025 in the Education section. She received the UN Gender Equality Award from the United Nations in September 2022. Amiwala was named one of Glamour Magazine's 2018 College Women of the Year.

On June 2, 2025, Amiwala announced her 2026 campaign for Illinois's 9th congressional district, and came in 6th place. Daniel Biss won the primary election, securing 29.6% of the vote in the field of 15 candidates.

On September 5th, 2026 Amiwala married Sufyaan Syed in a multi-day celebration in Chicago, Illinois.

== Professional Career ==
Amiwala is a daughter of immigrants and a first-generation college student. She champions access to college education and is featured by her alma matter, DePaul University.Amiwala has experience in the private sector by citing employment at Google as a consultant. She later left Google to run for congress full-time.

Amiwala was a featured keynote at her third TED (conference) notably at University of Illinois Chicago.

== Political positions ==
Amiwala "aims to make government resources more accessible to constituents, promote a living wage for workers, provide student debt relief, and advocate for reproductive freedom". She also favors Medicare for All and prioritizing environmental justice. She wants congressional Democrats to do more to resist Donald Trump's Presidency and to stop military aid to Israel and was one of the first elected officials to sign onto the public letter from Jewish Voice for Peace, urging for an immediate, permanent, ceasefire in Gaza. Amiwala gained attention after declining an invitation to attend the 2024 Democratic National Convention, due to the Biden-Harris Administration's stance of the Israel-Gaza war. She advocates regulating artificial intelligence, both to protect workers at risk of losing their jobs, and to protect racially marginalized people from surveillance.

Amiwala also urges an investment in K-12 Education from more federal funding sources, to ease the burden on property tax payers and local residents, without compromising on the quality of public education.

== Electoral results ==
2026 U.S. House of Representatives, Illinois's 9th Congressional District - Democratic primary results
Party	Candidate	Votes	%
Democratic	Daniel Biss	36,781	29.6
Democratic	Kat Abughazaleh	32,271	25.9
Democratic	Laura Fine	25,326	20.3
Democratic	Mike Simmons	8,647	7.0
Democratic	Phil Andrew	7,709	6.2
Democratic	Bushra Amiwala	6,240	5.0
Democratic	Hoan Huynh	2,174	1.8
Democratic	Patricia Brown	1,600	1.3
Democratic	Jeff Cohen	1,041	0.8
Democratic	Justin Ford	748	0.6
Democratic	Bethany Johnson	613	0.5
Democratic	Sam Polan	508	0.4
Democratic	Howard Rosenblum	296	0.2
Democratic	Nick Pyati	227	0.2
Democratic	Mark Fredrickson	213	0.2
Total votes		124,201	100.0
