= Jennifer Gong-Gershowitz =

American politician

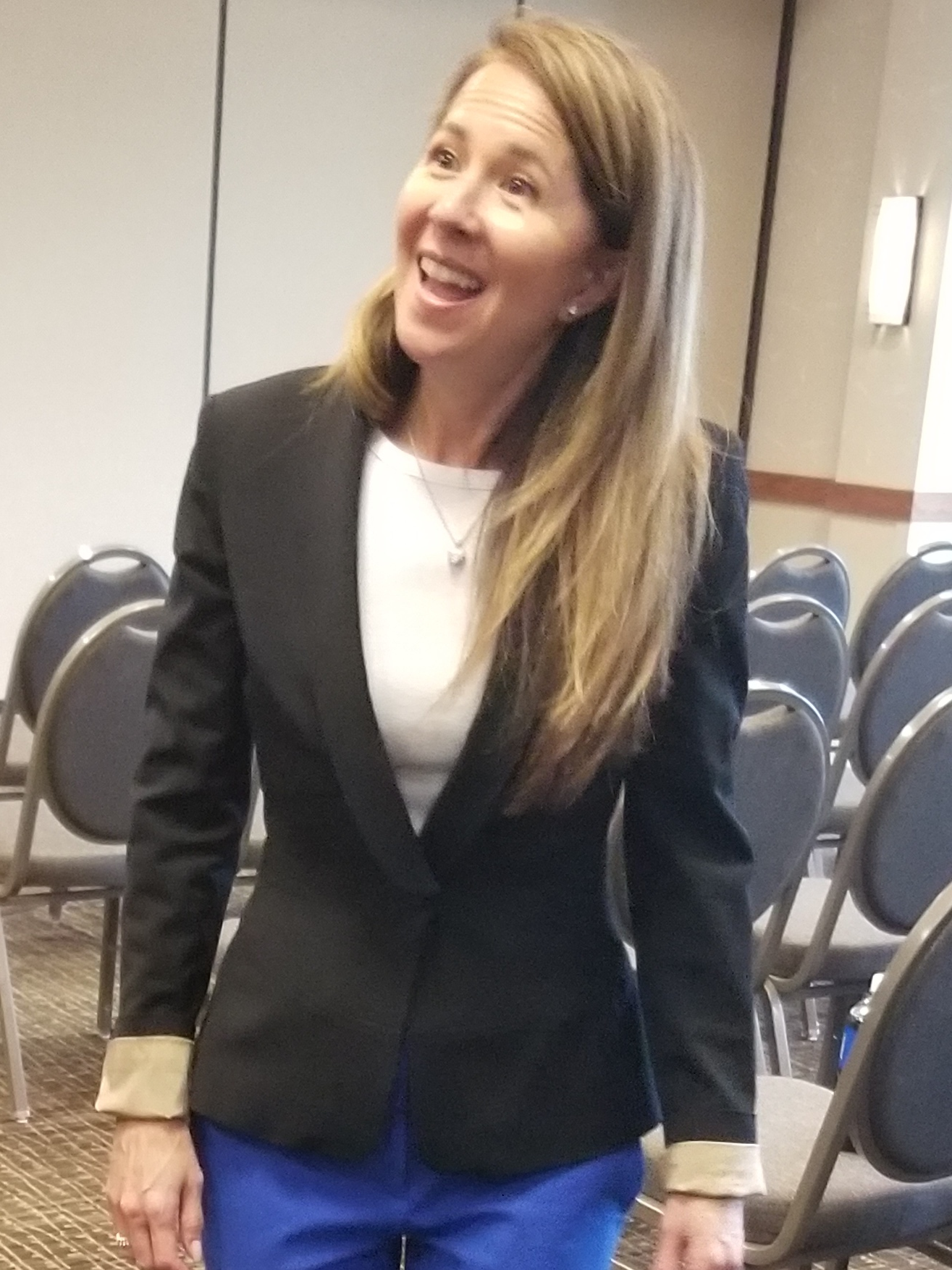
- Gong-Gershowitz in 2018

Member of the Illinois House of Representatives from the 17th district
- Incumbent
- Assumed office January 6, 2019
- Preceded by: Laura Fine

Personal details
- Born: 1968 or 1969 (age 57–58) Oak Park, Illinois, U.S.
- Party: Democratic
- Children: 3
- Education: Indiana University, Bloomington (BA); Loyola University Chicago (JD); Northwestern University (LLM)
- Website: Official biography

Jennifer Gong-Gershowitz (born 1968/1969) is a Democratic member of the Illinois House of Representatives for the 17th district. The 17th district includes all or parts of Evanston, Glenview, Golf, Morton Grove, Northbrook, Skokie and Wilmette.

== Electoral career ==
Gong-Gershowitz received the Democratic nomination in the election to succeed Rep. Laura Fine, who was not seeking re-election and instead running for Illinois State Senate. Gong-Gershowitz won the 2018 general election with 69.2% of the vote and was re-elected in 2020. She was sworn in to her second term in 2021. She is the second Chinese American to serve in the Illinois General Assembly after Theresa Mah.

== Illinois House of Representatives ==
=== Committees ===
Gong-Gershowitz currently serves on four committees: the Immigration & Human Rights committee; the Energy & Environment committee; the Judiciary - Civil committee; and the Mental Health & Addiction committee. Additionally, she is the chairperson for both the Immigration & Human Rights committee and the Judiciary - Civil committee.

=== Legislation ===
Gong-Gershowitz has introduced several bills that have gone on to become law. This includes HB0376, which requires Illinois schools to create a unit of curriculum dedicated to studying Asian-American history, as well as HB0709, which required the Illinois Department of Human Services "to conduct a public information campaign to educate immigrants, refugees, asylum seekers, and other noncitizens residing in Illinois of their rights under the U.S. Constitution and Illinois laws that apply regardless of immigration status."

== Personal life ==
Gong-Gershowitz is of third-generation Chinese-American descent through her father, and Irish through her mother. She resides in Glenview with her husband and three sons. She is a human rights attorney by trade. She is Jewish.

== Electoral history ==
Illinois 17th Representative Democratic Primary, 2018
Party	Candidate	Votes	%
Democratic	Jennifer Gong-Gershowitz	7,800	36.61
Democratic	Candance Chow	7,165	33.63
Democratic	Mary Rita Luecke	3,526	16.55
Democratic	Alexandra Eidenberg	1,812	8.51
Democratic	Pete Dagher	1,002	4.70
Total votes		21,305	100.0

Illinois 17th Representative District General Election, 2018
Party	Candidate	Votes	%
Democratic	Jennifer Gong-Gershowitz	34,328	69.20
Republican	Peter Lee	15,281	30.80
Total votes		49,609	100.0

Illinois 17th Representative District General Election, 2020
Party	Candidate	Votes	%	±%
Democratic	Jennifer Gong-Gershowitz (incumbent)	42,471	67.62	−1.58%
Republican	Yesoe Yoon	18728	29.82	−0.98%
Green	Christopher Kruger	1606	2.56	N/A
Total votes		62,805	100.0	

Illinois 17th Representative District General Election, 2022
Party	Candidate	Votes	%	±%
Democratic	Jennifer Gong-Gershowitz (incumbent)	29,057	71.38	+3.76%
Republican	Bradley Martin	11648	28.62	−1.20%
Total votes		40,705	100.0	
