= Jewish Insider =

American news outlet

- Founder: Max Neuberger
- Products: Daily Kickoff, Daily Overtime
- Website: jewishinsider.com

Jewish Insider is a Washington, D.C.–based digital news outlet that covers U.S. politics, foreign policy, and issues of interest to the American Jewish community. Its coverage includes political campaigns, public policy, and developments in Jewish communal life. Founded in 2015, it acquired eJewishPhilanthropy in 2021. eJP covers developments in Jewish philanthropy, communal institutions, and nonprofit leadership.

== History ==
=== Jewish Insider ===
Jewish Insider, a daily news service based in Washington, D.C., was started by Max Neuberger. In 2015, Tribe Media Corp., owner of the Jewish Journal, acquired Jewish Insider. However, Tribe Media Corp. now describes itself as comprising The Jewish Journal, JewishJournal.com, the Jewish Journal Podcast Network, and We the Tribe Events. Jewish Insider is now published by Level Three Labs, LLC, which also publishes eJewishPhilanthropy.

Jewish Insider covers U.S. politics, philanthropy, and business news with a Jewish angle. The outlet has been characterized as right-leaning, as well as neoconservative and right-wing by progressive commentators at The American Prospect.

=== eJewishPhilanthropy ===
eJewishPhilanthropy, a website geared to the professional Jewish community, was founded in 2007 by Dan Brown. As of March 2014, it reported more than 150,000 monthly visitors. In 2021, Jewish Insider acquired eJewishPhilanthropy.

== Notable journalists ==
- Gabby Deutch, daughter of AJC CEO Ted Deutch until 2026, when she moved to The Atlantic.
- Will Bredderman, formerly of the New York Observer and The Daily Beast, covers City Hall.
- Lahav Harkov, who was previously the Senior Contributing Editor, Diplomatic Reporter and Knesset Reporter for The Jerusalem Post, joined Jewish Insider as its Senior Political Correspondent.

== Notable coverage ==
In September 2024, Jewish Insider published an article repeating a claim by Michigan Attorney General Dana Nessel that Representative Rashida Tlaib had said Nessel was targeting pro-Palestinian protesters at the University of Michigan because she (Nessel) is Jewish. The false claim was debunked by the Metro Times. Jewish Insider later updated its article, revising the wording without adding a correction by changing "claimed" to "suggested". The Council on American–Islamic Relations condemned Jewish Insider and Nessel for perpetrating a "blatant and hateful hoax" against Tlaib.

Jewish Insider first reported the antisemitic, misogynistic, and conspiratorial social media posts that led to the resignation of Chicago school board president Mitchell Johnson in 2024, and also brought to light the antisemitic social media posts of Kingsley Wilson, a Defense Department official in the Second Trump Administration.

== See also ==
- Jewish Telegraphic Agency
- Jewish News Syndicate
