= Brandy Zadrozny =

American journalist (born 1980)

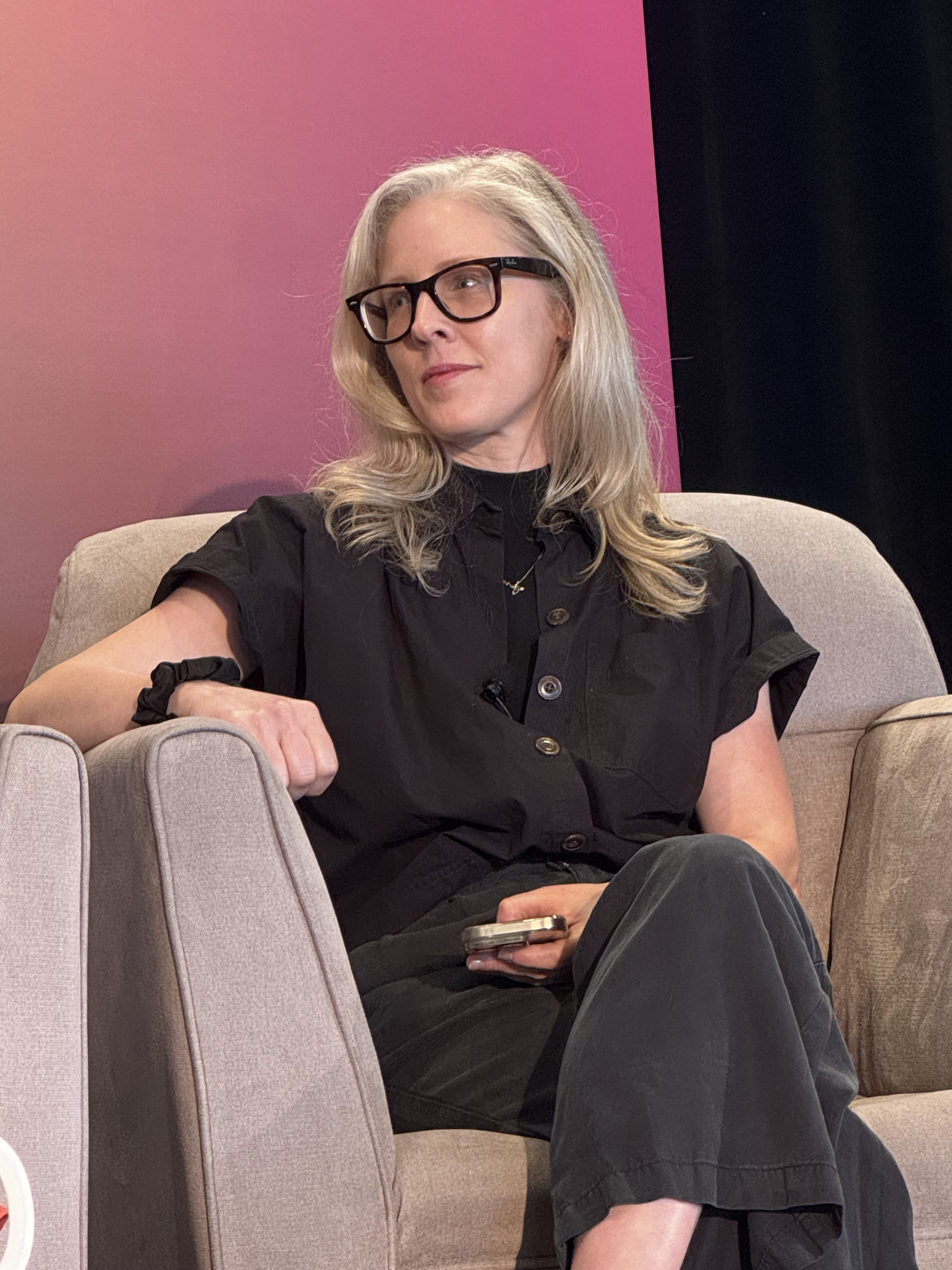
- Brandy Zadrozny at the 2025 Knight Media Forum
- Born: August 30, 1980 (age 46)
- Education: Pratt Institute
- Occupation: Journalist
- Employer(s): NBC News, MSNBC
- Children: 3

Brandy Zadrozny (born August 30, 1980) is an American investigative journalist and reporter with NBC News and MS NOW who specializes in radicalization, extremism and disinformation on the Internet.

== Early life and education ==
Before entering journalism, Zadrozny previously worked as a librarian for the New York Board of Education from 2003 to 2007 and for the Champlain College in Burlington, Vermont in 2011. Zadrozny also worked as a news librarian and researcher for ABC News, and later for Fox News.

== Career ==
Zadrozny started her career in journalism in 2013 at The Daily Beast. Since 2018, Zadrozny has been working as a journalist for NBC News. At NBC News, Zadrozny has written on the "depressing" aspects of the Internet, focusing on political extremism and conspiracy theories like QAnon and the Stop the Steal movement, and disinformation on social media, particularly as it pertains to the COVID-19 pandemic and anti-vaccination activism. Discussing her motivation to cover these movements in her journalism, Zadrozny said that "suddenly, the stupid stuff on the internet, the scary stuff on the internet, became just so mainstream and important. And that totally should not be."

In October 2020, Zadrozny was criticized on Tucker Carlson's Fox News show Tucker Carlson Tonight. Carlson's guest Darren Beattie, a former speechwriter for Donald Trump, accused Zadrozny of trying to "dig up personal information about anonymous Trump supporters online ... basically, so she can ruin their lives." NBC News issued a statement rebuking what they described as "Carlson dangerously and dishonestly" targeting Zadrozny, saying that the claims were a "smear" and had led to Zadrozny being harassed. In their statement, NBC News said Zadrozny is "relentlessly well-researched and sophisticated in her understanding of disinformation and conspiracy theories on the Internet", and that they "couldn’t be prouder of Brandy, and we will continue to vigorously support her work."

== Personal life ==
Zadrozny ran the New York City Marathon on November 1, 2025, with a time of 5:27:53.
