= Cook County Board of Commissioners 10th district =

- District
- District 10
- Current Board of Commissioners map, 10th district highlighted in red
- Country: United States
- State: Illinois
- County: Cook
- Municipalities: list: Chicago

Government
  - Type: District
  - Body: Cook County Board of Commissioners
  - Commissioner: Bridget Gainer (D)

Cook County Board of Commissioners 10th district is a single-member electoral district for the Cook County Board of Commissioners. The district is located entirely within the municipal boundaries of the city of Chicago. It is currently represented by Bridget Gainer, a Democrat.

== History ==
The district was established in 1994, when the board transitioned from holding elections in individual districts, as opposed to the previous practice of having two multi-member districts: one for ten members from the city of Chicago and another for seven members from suburban Cook County.

== Geography ==
=== 1994 boundaries ===
When the district was first established, the district represented parts of the North Side of Chicago and the northern suburbs of Cook County.

=== 2001 redistricting ===
New boundaries were adopted in August 2001, with redistricting taking place following the 2000 United States census.

The district's new boundaries were entirely within the city of Chicago, encompassing parts of the North Side of the city.

The district included the neighborhoods of Lakeview, Uptown, and Rogers Park.

=== 2012 redistricting ===
The geography of the district, as redistricted in 2012 following the 2010 United States census, strongly resembled its geography immediately following its previous, 2001, redistricting. The district continues to lie entirely within the city of Chicago, covering parts of the city's North Side.

The district was 16.29 square miles (10,426.27 acres).

=== 2022 redistricting ===
The district, as redistricted in 2022 following the 2020 United States census is entirely located in the city of Chicago.

== Politics ==
The district has only ever been represented by Democratic commissioners.

== List of commissioners representing the district ==
| Commissioner | Party | Years | Electoral history |
|---|---|---|---|
| Maria Pappas | Democratic | December 1994–December 1998 | Previously served one term as commissioner from Chicago at-large; elected in 1994 |
| Mike Quigley | Democratic | December 1998–April 2009 | Elected in 1998, 2002, 2006; resigned in April 2009 to serve in the United States House of Representatives |
| Bridget Gainer | Democratic | April 2009–present | Appointed in April 2009; elected in 2010, 2014, 2018, 2022 |

== Election results ==
Cook County Board of Commissioners 10th district general elections
| Year | Winning candidate | Party | Vote (pct) | Opponent | Party | Vote (pct) | Opponent | Party | Vote (pct) |
| 1994 | Maria Pappas | Democratic | | John McNeal | Republican | | Willie Adams | Harold Washington Party | |
| 1998 | Mike Quigley | Democratic | 56,208 (100%) | | | | | | |
| 2002 | Mike Quigley | Democratic | 60,457 (100%) | | | | | | |
| 2006 | Mike Quigley | Democratic | 62,905 (100%) | | | | | | |
| 2010 | Bridget Gainer | Democratic | 56,723 (74.65%) | Wes Fowler | Republican | 19,264 (25.35%) | | | |
| 2014 | Bridget Gainer | Democratic | 64,914 (100%) | | | | | | |
| 2018 | Bridget Gainer | Democratic | 113,803 (100%) | | | | | | |
| 2022 | Bridget Gainer | Democratic | 90,627 (80.76%) | Laura Mary Kotelman | Republican | 21,587 (19.24%) | | | |
