= 1986 Cook County, Illinois, elections =

- November 4, 1986
- Turnout: 55.95%

The Cook County, Illinois, general election was held on November 4, 1986.

Primaries were held March 18, 1986.

Elections were held for the offices of Assessor, Clerk, Sheriff, State's Attorney, Superintendent of Education Service Region, Treasurer, President of the Cook County Board of Commissioners, all 17 seats of the Cook County Board of Commissioners, both seats of the Cook County Board of Appeals, 3 seats on the Water Reclamation District Board, and judgeships on the Circuit Court of Cook County.

== Election information ==
1986 was a midterm election year in the United States. The primaries and general elections for Cook County races coincided with those for federal (Senate and House) and those for state elections.

=== Voter turnout ===
==== Primary election ====
Vote totals of primaries
Primary	Chicago vote totals	Suburban Cook County vote totals	Total Cook County vote totals
Democratic	548,326	124,471	672,799
Republican	25,962	79,517	105,479
Nonpartisan	3,654	13,948	17,602
Total	577,942	217,936	795,880

==== General election ====
The general election saw turnout of 55.95%, with 1,476,370 ballots cast. Chicago saw 841,085 ballots cast, and suburban Cook County saw 635,2865 ballots cast.

=== Straight-ticket voting ===
Ballots had a straight-ticket voting option in 1986.

Party	Number of straight-ticket votes
Democratic	52,099
Republican	162,362
Allin Walker Party	17
Illinois Solidarity	951
Libertarian	683
Socialist Workers	951
Quality Cong. Rep.	421

== Assessor ==
1986 Cook County Assessor election
- November 4, 1986
- Turnout: 50.30%
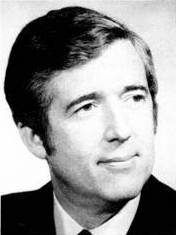

Nominee	Thomas Hynes	Le Roy M. Graham
Party	Democratic	Republican
Popular vote	969,500	357,758
Percentage	73.05%	26.95%
Assessor before election
Thomas Hynes
Democratic
Elected Assessor
Thomas Hynes
Democratic

In the 1986 Cook County Assessor election, incumbent third-term assessor Thomas Hynes, a Democrat, was reelected.

=== Primaries ===
==== Democratic ====
Cook County Assessor Democratic primary
Party	Candidate	Votes	%
Democratic	Thomas C. Hynes (incumbent)	405,270	100
Total votes		405,270	100

==== Republican ====
By winning the Republican nomination, Le Roy M. Graham became the first black candidate to run countywide as a Republican nominee.

Cook County Assessor Republican primary
Party	Candidate	Votes	%
Republican	Le Roy M. Graham	77,243	100
Total votes		77,243	100

=== General election ===
Cook County Assessor election
Party	Candidate	Votes	%
Democratic	Thomas C. Hynes (incumbent)	969,500	73.05
Republican	Le Roy M. Graham	357,758	26.95
Total votes		1,327,258	100

== Clerk ==
1986 Cook County Clerk election
- November 4, 1986
- Turnout: 51.56%
Candidate	Stanley Kusper	Diana Nelson
Party	Democratic	Republican
Popular vote	929,949	430,568
Percentage	68.35%	31.35%
Clerk before election
Stanley Kusper
Democratic
Elected Clerk
Stanley Kusper
Democratic

In the 1986 Cook County Clerk election, incumbent third-term clerk Stanley Kusper, a Democrat, was reelected.

=== Primaries ===
==== Democratic ====
Incumbent Stanley Kusper defeated two challengers to win renomination.

The more successful of Kusper's two challengers was Jeanne Quinn, who four years earlier had become the first Democrat to be elected to the Cook County Board of Commissioners from suburban Cook County in half a century. Instead of seeking reelection, she instead opted to launch a challenge to Kusper. Kusper's other challenger was 28-year-old millionaire businessman Patrick M. Finley.

Cook County Clerk Democratic primary
Party	Candidate	Votes	%
Democratic	Stanley T. Kusper, Jr.	255,761	45.73
Democratic	Jeanne P. Quinn	218,442	30.08
Democratic	Patrick M. Finley	95,115	15.22
Total votes		569,318	100

==== Republican ====
Former Illinois state representative Diana Nelson won the Republican primary.

Cook County Clerk Republican primary
Party	Candidate	Votes	%
Republican	Diana Nelson	80,639	100
Total votes		80,639	100

=== General election ===
Cook County Clerk election
Party	Candidate	Votes	%
Democratic	Stanley T. Kusper, Jr.	929,949	68.35
Republican	Diana Nelson	430,568	31.35
Total votes		1,360,517	100

== Sheriff ==
1986 Cook County Sheriff election
- November 4, 1986
- Turnout: 52.30%

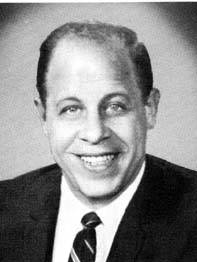
Candidate	James E. O'Grady	Richard Elrod
Party	Republican	Democratic
Popular vote	706,659	673,233
Percentage	51.12%	48.79%
Sheriff before election
Richard Elrod
Democratic
Elected Sheriff
James E. O'Grady
Republican

In the 1986 Cook County Sheriff election, incumbent fourth-term sheriff Richard Elrod, a Democrat, was defeated by Republican James E. O'Grady.

O'Grady became the first Republican elected to a countywide executive office in Cook County since Bernard Carey was elected to his final term as Cook County State's Attorney in 1976.

=== Primaries ===
==== Democratic ====
Cook County Sheriff Democratic primary
Party	Candidate	Votes	%
Democratic	Richard J. Elrod (incumbent)	418,843	100
Total votes		418,843	100

==== Republican ====
Cook County Sheriff Republican primary
Party	Candidate	Votes	%
Republican	James E. O'Grady	82,185	100
Total votes		82,185	100

=== General election ===
O'Grady won the endorsement of the Chicago Tribune for the general election.

O'Grady's victory came from winning the county's suburbs by a 2–1 margin. He also performed well in some of the ethnically white wards of Chicago, being able to cary 14 of the city's 50 wards.

Cook County Sheriff election
Party	Candidate	Votes	%
Republican	James E. O'Grady	706,659	51.12
Democratic	Richard J. Elrod (incumbent)	673,233	48.79
Total votes		1,379,892	100

== Superintendent of the Education Service Region ==
1986 Superintendent of the Cook County Education Service Region election
- November 4, 1986
- Turnout: 49.20%
Candidate	Richard J. Martwick	Tony Torres
Party	Democratic	Republican
Popular vote	824,384	473,694
Percentage	63.51%	36.49%
Superintendent before election
Richard J. Martwick
Democratic
Elected Superintendent
Richard J. Martwick
Democratic

In the 1986 Superintendent of the Cook County Education Service Region election, incumbent third-term superintendent Richard J. Martwick, a Democrat, was reelected.

=== Primaries ===
==== Democratic ====
Cook County Superintendent of Education Service Region Democratic primary
Party	Candidate	Votes	%
Democratic	Richard J. Marwick (incumbent)	297,358	72.36
Democratic	Tom Van Dam	113,599	27.64
Total votes		410,957	100

==== Republican ====
No candidate ran in the Republican primary. The Republican Party ultimately nominated Tony Torres.

=== General election ===
Cook County Superintendent of Education Service Region election
Party	Candidate	Votes	%
Democratic	Richard J. Martwick (incumbent)	824,384	63.51
Republican	Tony Torres	473,694	36.49
Total votes		1,298,078	100

== Treasurer ==
1986 Cook County Treasurer election
- November 4, 1986
- Turnout: 50.62%
Candidate	Edward J. Rosewell	Richard M. Hetzer
Party	Democratic	Republican
Popular vote	905,190	410,909
Percentage	68.78%	31.22%
Treasurer before election
Edward J. Rosewell
Democratic
Elected Treasurer
Edward J. Rosewell
Democratic

In the 1986 Cook County Treasurer election, incumbent third-term treasurer Edward J. Rosewell, a Democrat, was reelected.

=== Primaries ===
==== Democratic ====
Cook County Treasurer Democratic primary
Party	Candidate	Votes	%
Democratic	Edward J. Rosewell (incumbent)	399,143	100
Total votes		399,143	100

==== Republican ====
Cook County Treasurer Republican primary
Party	Candidate	Votes	%
Republican	Richard M. Hetzer	77,901	100
Total votes		77,901	100

=== General election ===
Cook County Treasurer election
Party	Candidate	Votes	%
Democratic	Edward J. Rosewell (incumbent)	905,190	68.78
Republican	Richard M. Hetzer	410,909	31.22
Total votes		1,316,099	100

== President of the Cook County Board of Commissioners ==
1986 President of the Cook County Board of Commissioners election
- November 4, 1986
- Turnout: 50.54%
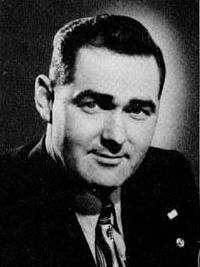

Nominee	George Dunne	Joseph D. Mathewson
Party	Democratic	Republican
Popular vote	808,126	525,288
Percentage	60.61%	39.39%
President before election
George Dunne
Democratic
Elected President
George Dunne
Democratic

In the 1986 President of the Cook County Board of Commissioners election, incumbent president George Dunne, a Democrat that had held the office since 1969, was reelected.

=== Primaries ===
==== Democratic ====
President of the Cook County Board of Commissioners Democratic primary
Party	Candidate	Votes	%
Democratic	George W. Dunne	435,063	100
Total votes		435,063	100

==== Republican ====
President of the Cook County Board of Commissioners Republican primary
Party	Candidate	Votes	%
Republican	Joseph D. Mathewson	63,625	100
Total votes		63,625	100

=== General election ===
President of the Cook County Board of Commissioners election
Party	Candidate	Votes	%
Democratic	George W. Dunne	808,126	60.61
Republican	Joseph D. Mathewson	525,288	39.39
Total votes		1,333,414	100

== Cook County Board of Commissioners ==
1986 Cook County Board of Commissioners election
- November 4, 1986

All 17 seats on the Cook County Board of Commissioners 9 seats needed for a majority
	First party	Second party
Party	Democratic	Republican
Seats before	11	6
Seats won	10	7
Seat change	▼1	▲1
Popular vote	6,766,182	3,689,203
Percentage	64.71%	35.29%

The 1986 Cook County Board of Commissioners election saw all seventeen seats of the Cook County Board of Commissioners up for election to four-year terms in two sets of elections (ten elected from an election held in the city of Chicago and seven elected from and election held in suburban Cook County).

Democrats lost a seat, and Republicans, conversely, gained a seat.

== Cook County Board of Appeals ==
1986 Cook County Board of Appeals election
- November 4, 1986

2 of 2 seats on the Cook County Board of Appeals
	First party	Second party
Party	Democratic	Republican
Seats before	2	0
Seats after	2	0
Seat change	Steady	Steady

In the 1986 Cook County Board of Appeals election, both seats on the board were up for election. The election was an at-large election.

One incumbent Democrat, Pat Quinn, did not seek reelection, instead running for Illinois Treasurer. The other incumbent Democrat, Harry H. Semrow, sought reelection.

=== Primaries ===
==== Democratic ====
Cook County Board of Appeals Democratic primary
Party	Candidate	Votes	%
Democratic	Wilson Frost	331,593	41.44
Democratic	Harry H. Semrow (incumbent)	249,728	31.21
Democratic	John W. McCaffrey	218,849	27.35

==== Republican ====
Cook County Board of Appeals Republican primary
Party	Candidate	Votes	%
Republican	Kenneth R. Hurst	73,459	50.48
Republican	Ronald M. Hamelberg	72,055	49.52

=== General election ===
Cook County Board of Appeals Democratic primary
Party	Candidate	Votes	%
Democratic	Wilson Frost	796,663	31.68
Democratic	Harry H. Semrow (incumbent)	756,164	30.07
Republican	Kenneth R. Hurst	491,491	19.55
Republican	Ronald M. Hamelberg	470,051	18.69

== Water Reclamation District Board ==
1986 Metropolitan Water Reclamation District of Greater Chicago election
- November 4, 1986

3 of 9 seats on the Metropolitan Water Reclamation District of Greater Chicago

In the 1986 Metropolitan Water Reclamation District of Greater Chicago election, three of the nine seats on the Metropolitan Water Reclamation District of Greater Chicago board were up for election in an at-large election. All three Democratic nominees won.

== Judicial elections ==
Partisan elections were held for judgeships on the Circuit Court of Cook County, due to vacancies. Other judgeships had retention elections.

== Other elections ==
Coinciding with the primaries, elections were held to elect both the Democratic and Republican committeemen for the suburban townships.

== See also ==
- 1986 Illinois elections
