= 1990 Cook County, Illinois, elections =

- November 6, 1990
- Turnout: 52.75%

The Cook County, Illinois, general election was held on November 6, 1990.

Primaries were held March 20, 1990.

Elections were held for the offices of Assessor, Clerk, Sheriff, State's Attorney, Cook County Superintendent of Education Service Region, Treasurer, President of the Cook County Board of Commissioners, all 17 seats of the Cook County Board of Commissioners, both seats of the Cook County Board of Appeals, 3 seats on the Water Reclamation District Board, and judgeships on the Circuit Court of Cook County.

== Election information ==
1990 was a midterm election year in the United States. The primaries and general elections for Cook County races coincided with those for federal (Senate and House) and those for state elections.

=== Voter turnout ===
==== Primary election ====
Turnout in the primaries was 36.93%, with 985,614 ballots cast.

Chicago saw 607,899 ballots cast, and suburban Cook County saw 30.24% turnout (with 377,715 ballots cast).

Vote totals of primaries
Primary	Chicago vote totals	Suburban Cook County vote totals	Total Cook County vote totals
Democratic	577,343	214,446	791,789
Republican	30,332	152,908	183,240
Illinois Solidarity	199	178	377
Independent Progressive	21	0	21
Nonpartisan	4	10,183	10,187
Total	607,899	377,715	985,614

==== General election ====
The general election saw turnout of 52.75%, with 1,408,516 ballots cast. Chicago saw 750,842 ballots cast, and suburban Cook County saw 52.82% turnout (with 657,674 ballots cast).

=== Straight-ticket voting ===
Ballots had a straight-ticket voting option in 1990.

Party	Number of straight-ticket votes
Democratic	227,523
Republican	116,014
Harold Washington	14,352
Illinois Solidarity	1,168
Independent Progressive	7
Libertarian	3,005

== Assessor ==
1990 Cook County Assessor election
- November 6, 1990
- Turnout: 46.81%
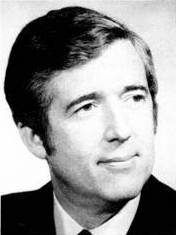

Nominee	Thomas Hynes	Ronald Bean	Donald Pamon
Party	Democratic	Republican	Harold Washington
Popular vote	775,493	333,325	141,015
Percentage	62.05%	26.67%	11.28%
Assessor before election
Thomas Hynes
Democratic
Elected Assessor
Thomas Hynes
Democratic

In the 1990 Cook County Assessor election, incumbent fourth-term assessor Thomas Hynes, a Democrat, was reelected.

=== Primaries ===
==== Democratic ====
Cook County Assessor Democratic primary
Party	Candidate	Votes	%
Democratic	Thomas C. Hynes (incumbent)	512,546	100
Total votes		512,546	100

==== Republican ====
Cook County Assessor Republican primary
Party	Candidate	Votes	%
Republican	Ronald Bean	121,352	100
Total votes		121,352	100

=== General election ===
Cook County Assessor election
Party	Candidate	Votes	%
Democratic	Thomas C. Hynes (incumbent)	775,493	62.05
Republican	Ronald Bean	333,325	26.67
Harold Washington	Donald Pamon	141,015	11.28
Total votes		1,249,833	100

== Clerk ==
1990 Cook County Clerk election
- November 6, 1990
- Turnout: 47.19%
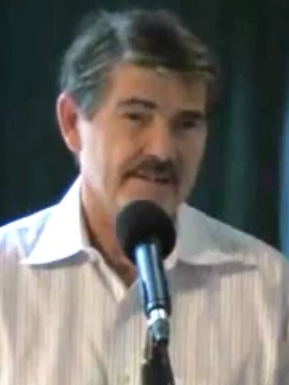

Candidate	David Orr	Sam Panayotovich	Heldia R. Richardson
Party	Democratic	Republican	Harold Washington
Popular vote	799,884	353,531	106,588
Percentage	63.48%	28.06%	8.46%
Clerk before election
Stanley Kusper
Democratic
Elected Clerk
David Orr
Democratic

In the 1990 Cook County Clerk election, incumbent fourth-term clerk Stanley Kusper, a Democrat, did not seek reelection, instead opting to run for both Cook County Board of Commissioners president and Cook County commissioner. Democrat David Orr was elected to succeed him.

=== Primaries ===
==== Democratic ====
Chicago alderman David Orr won the Democratic nomination. Sutker, who placed second, had been slated by the Cook County Democratic Party organization as its endorsed candidate in the race.

Cook County Clerk Democratic primary
Party	Candidate	Votes	%
Democratic	David D. Orr	353,772	55.94
Democratic	Calvin R. Sutker	144,083	22.78
Democratic	Joanne H. Alter	134,560	21.28
Total votes		632,415	100

==== Republican ====
Cook County Clerk Republican primary
Party	Candidate	Votes	%
Republican	Samuel "Sam" Panayotovich	130,406	100
Total votes		130,406	100

=== General election ===
Cook County Clerk election
Party	Candidate	Votes	%
Democratic	David D. Orr	799,884	63.48
Republican	Samuel "Sam" Panayotovich	353,531	28.06
Harold Washington	Heldia R. Richardson	106,588	8.46
Total votes		1,260,003	100

== Sheriff ==
1990 Cook County Sheriff election
- November 6, 1990
- Turnout: 48.63%
Candidate	Michael F. Sheahan	James E. O'Grady	Tommy Brewer
Party	Democratic	Republican	Harold Washington
Popular vote	719,489	369,631	191,101
Percentage	55.41%	28.47%	14.72%
Sheriff before election
James E. O'Grady
Republican
Elected Sheriff
Michael F. Sheahan
Democratic

In the 1990 Cook County Sheriff election, incumbent first-term sheriff James E. O'Grady, a Republican, was defeated by Democrat Michael F. Sheahan.

=== Primaries ===
==== Democratic ====
Cook County Sheriff Democratic primary
Party	Candidate	Votes	%
Democratic	Michael F. Sheahan	402,634	69.86
Democratic	Philip Morris	106,237	18.43
Democratic	John J. Flood	67,450	11.70
Total votes		576,321	100

==== Republican ====
Cook County Sheriff Republican primary
Party	Candidate	Votes	%
Republican	James E. O'Grady (incumbent)	136,857	100
Total votes		136,857	100

==== Illinois Solidarity ====
Cook County Sheriff Illinois Solidarity primary
Party	Candidate	Votes	%
Illinois Solidarity	William M. Piechuch, Sr.	189	100
Total votes		189	100

=== General election ===
Corruption allegations took a toll on incumbent Republican James E. O'Grady's prospects for reelection. O'Grady ultimately had failed to live up to his 1986 campaign promises of disposing of politics and corruption in the Cook County Sheriff's Office, and had become unpopular among his constituents.

Democratic nominee Michael F. Sheahan defeated O'Grady by a broad margin. O'Grady suffered one of biggest defeats that a Republican Party nominee had experienced in a countywide Cook County election in years. Sheahan had managed to beat O'Grady in 24 of the county's 30 suburban townships and in every ward of Chicago. Sheahan had even managed to carry many of the county's Republican strongholds. Within the city of Chicago, O'Grady even trailed Harold Washington Party nominee Tommy Brewer, who was considered a political unknown.

Cook County Sheriff election
Party	Candidate	Votes	%
Democratic	Michael F. Sheahan	719,489	55.41
Republican	James E. O'Grady (incumbent)	369,631	28.47
Harold Washington	Tommy Brewer	191,101	14.72
Illinois Solidarity	William M. Piechuch, Sr.	18,318	1.41
Total votes		1,298,539	100

== State's Attorney (special election) ==
1990 Cook County State's Attorney special election
- November 6, 1990
- Turnout: 48.95%

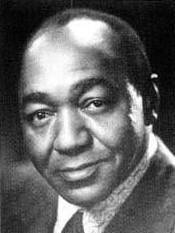

Candidate	Jack O'Malley	Cecil A. Partee	Janice H. Robinson
Party	Republican	Democratic	Harold Washington
Popular vote	692,192	511,424	103,353
Percentage	52.96%	39.13%	7.91%
State's Attorney before election
Cecil A. Partee
Democratic
Elected State's Attorney
Jack O'Malley
Republican

In the 1990 Cook County State's Attorney special election, incumbent state's attorney Cecil A. Partee, a Democrat appointed in 1989 after Richard M. Daley resigned to serve as mayor of Chicago, lost reelection to Republican Jack O'Malley.

This is the last time that a non-incumbent Republican has won election to a Cook County executive office.

=== Primaries ===
==== Democratic ====
Cook County State's Attorney Democratic primary
Party	Candidate	Votes	%
Democratic	Cecil A. Partee (incumbent)	339,238	49.90
Democratic	Patrick J. O'Connor	249,922	36.76
Democratic	Raul A. Villalobos	54,914	8.08
Democratic	Ray J. Smith	35,748	5.26
Total votes		679,822	100

==== Republican ====
Cook County State's Attorney Republican primary
Party	Candidate	Votes	%
Republican	John M. "Jack" O'Malley	136,835	100
Total votes		136,835	100

=== General election ===
Cook County State's Attorney election
Party	Candidate	Votes	%
Republican	John M. "Jack" O'Malley	692,192	52.96
Democratic	Cecil A. Partee (incumbent)	511,424	39.13
Harold Washington	Janice H. Robinson	103,353	7.91
Total votes		1,306,969	100

== Superintendent of the Education Service Region ==
1990 Superintendent of the Cook County Education Education Service Region election
- November 6, 1990
- Turnout: 44.66%
Candidate	Richard J. Martwick	Bill Miceli	Dorothy C. Hogan
Party	Democratic	Republican	Harold Washington
Popular vote	581,951	426,855	183,678
Percentage	48.80%	35.80%	15.40%
Superintendent before election
Richard J. Martwick
Democratic
Elected Superintendent
Richard J. Martwick
Democratic

In the 1990 Superintendent of the Cook County Education Service Region election, incumbent fourth-term superintendent Richard J. Martwick, a Democrat, was reelected.

This was the penultimate election before the position was eliminated.

=== Primaries ===
==== Democratic ====
Cook County Superintendent of Education Service Region Democratic primary
Party	Candidate	Votes	%
Democratic	Richard J. Marwick (incumbent)	449,752	100
Total votes		449,752	100

==== Republican ====
Cook County Superintendent of Education Service Region Republican primary
Party	Candidate	Votes	%
Republican	William C. "Bill" Miceli	120,963	100
Total votes		120,963	100

=== General election ===
Cook County Superintendent of Education Service Region election
Party	Candidate	Votes	%
Democratic	Richard J. Martwick (incumbent)	581,951	48.80
Republican	William C. "Bill" Miceli	426,855	35.80
Harold Washington	Dorothy C. Hogan	183,678	15.40
Total votes		1,192,484	100

== Treasurer ==
1990 Cook County Treasurer election
- November 6, 1990
- Turnout: 45.87%
Candidate	Edward J. Rosewell	Thomas D. Eilers	Charles W. Alexander
Party	Democratic	Republican	Harold Washington
Popular vote	710,699	357,673	156,294
Percentage	58.03%	29.21%	12.76%
Treasurer before election
Edward J. Rosewell
Democratic
Elected Treasurer
Edward J. Rosewell
Democratic

In the 1990 Cook County Treasurer election, incumbent fourth-term treasurer Edward J. Rosewell, a Democrat, was reelected.

=== Primaries ===
==== Democratic ====
Cook County Treasurer Democratic primary
Party	Candidate	Votes	%
Democratic	Edward J. Rosewell (incumbent)	373,477	58.02
Democratic	Danny K. Davis	270,269	41.98
Total votes		643,746	100

==== Republican ====
Cook County Treasurer Republican primary
Party	Candidate	Votes	%
Republican	Thomas D. Eilers	127,341	100
Total votes		127,341	100

=== General election ===
Cook County Treasurer election
Party	Candidate	Votes	%
Democratic	Edward J. Rosewell (incumbent)	710,699	58.03
Republican	Thomas D. Eilers	357,673	29.21
Harold Washington	Charles W. Alexander	156,294	12.76
Total votes		1,224,666	100

== President of the Cook County Board of Commissioners ==
1990 President of the Cook County Board of Commissioners election
- November 6, 1990
- Turnout: 48.10%

Nominee	Richard Phelan	Aldo DeAngelis	Barbara J. Norman
Party	Democratic	Republican	Harold Washington
Popular vote	714,638	405,771	163,817
Percentage	55.65%	31.60%	12.76%
President before election
George Dunne
Democratic
Elected President
Richard Phelan
Democratic

In the 1990 President of the Cook County Board of Commissioners election, incumbent president George Dunne, a Democrat that had held the office since 1969, did not seek reelection. Democrat Richard Phelan was elected to succeed him.

=== Primaries ===
==== Democratic ====
Incumbent board president George Dunne made a surprise announcement that he would not seek re-election in 1990.

The Cook County Democratic Party's efforts select a candidate to slate for president was chaotic. The party organization ultimately slated State Senator Ted Lechowicz. The chaotic nature of the slating process negated the typical benefit of carrying the party organization's endorsement, and Lechowicz ultimately finished third in the primary.

Richard Phelan, a millionaire attorney from Winnetka, won the Democratic primary. He had entered the race as a political unknown. Phelan did not have a strong political organization, but ran a multimillion-dollar campaign with heavy investment in television advertising. He defeated former Illinois Appellate judge R. Eugene Pincham, State Senator Lechowicz, and Cook County Clerk Stanley Kusper. Phelan ran on a message of change, running against the county Democratic Party establishment. Originally, Kusper had been the race's frontrunner, but by election day, had been relegated to an also-ran.

President of the Cook County Board of Commissioners Democratic primary
Party	Candidate	Votes	%
Democratic	Richard J. Phelan	227,683	38.83
Democratic	R. Eugene Pincham	236,472	33.07
Democratic	Ted Lechowicz	138,569	19.38
Democratic	Stanley T. Kusper, Jr.	62,364	8.72
Total votes		665,088	100

==== Republican ====
President of the Cook County Board of Commissioners Republican primary
Party	Candidate	Votes	%
Republican	Aldo A. Deangelis	120,627	100
Total votes		120,627	100

=== General election ===
President of the Cook County Board of Commissioners election
Party	Candidate	Votes	%
Democratic	Richard J. Phelan	714,638	55.65
Republican	Aldo A. DeAngelis	405,771	31.60
Harold Washington	Barbara J. Norman	163,817	12.76
Total votes		1,284,226	100

== Cook County Board of Commissioners ==
1990 Cook County Board of Commissioners election
- November 6, 1990

All 17 seats on the Cook County Board of Commissioners 9 seats needed for a majority
	First party	Second party	Third party
Party	Democratic	Republican	Harold Washington
Seats before	10	7	0
Seats won	11	6	0
Seat change	▲1	▼1	Steady
Popular vote	5,212,283	3,048,275	915,432
Percentage	56.80%	33.22%	9.98%
Swing	▼4.1%	▼2.07%	new

The 1990 Cook County Board of Commissioners election saw all seventeen seats of the Cook County Board of Commissioners up for election to four-year terms in two sets of elections (ten elected from an election held in the city of Chicago and seven elected from an election held in suburban Cook County). This was the last election for the Cook County Board of Commissioners done this way, as the board would switch to districts for its 1994 election.

By winning a suburban seat, Democrats increased their majority by a single seat.

== Cook County Board of Appeals ==
1990 Cook County Board of Appeals election
- November 6, 1990

2 of 2 seats on the Cook County Board of Appeals
	First party	Second party	Third party
Party	Democratic	Republican	Harold Washington
Seats before	2	0	0
Seats after	2	0	0
Seat change	Steady	Steady	Steady

In the 1990 Cook County Board of Appeals election, both seats on the board were up for election. The election was an at-large election.

=== Primaries ===
==== Democratic ====
Cook County Board of Appeals Democratic primary
Party	Candidate	Votes	%
Democratic	Wilson Frost (incumbent)	390,175	41.44
Democratic	Joseph Berrios (incumbent)	330,190	35.07
Democratic	Edward J. Schumann	221,200	23.49

==== Republican ====
Cook County Board of Appeals Republican primary
Party	Candidate	Votes	%
Republican	Charles A. Wilson	121,954	50.88
Republican	Gilbert M. Vega	116,617	49.12

=== General election ===
Cook County Board of Appeals Democratic primary
Party	Candidate	Votes	%
Democratic	Wilson Frost (incumbent)	634,509	28.06
Democratic	Joseph Berrios (incumbent)	610,760	26.63
Republican	Charles A. Wilson	407,671	17.77
Republican	Gilbert M. Vega	379,048	16.53
Harold Washington	Kenneth G. Hopkins	131,007	5.71
Harold Washington	Will Lawrence	121,624	5.30

== Water Reclamation District Board ==
1990 Metropolitan Water Reclamation District of Greater Chicago election
- November 6, 1990

3 of 9 seats on the Metropolitan Water Reclamation District of Greater Chicago

In the 1990 Metropolitan Water Reclamation District of Greater Chicago election, three of the nine seats on the Metropolitan Water Reclamation District of Greater Chicago board were up for election in an at-large election. All three Democratic nominees won.

== Judicial elections ==
Partisan elections were held for judgeships on the Circuit Court of Cook County, due to vacancies. Other judgeships had retention elections.

== Ballot questions ==
Two ballot questions were included on ballots county-wide during the November general election.

=== Establish Financial Consumer Association ===
Establish Financial Consumer Association
Candidate	Votes	%
Yes	655,931	76.01
No	207,023	23.99
Total votes	862,954	100
Turnout	{{{votes}}}	61.27%

=== Single Membered Districts ===
Voters approved having members of the Cook County Board of Commissioners be elected from single-member districts in future elections.

Single Membered Districts
Candidate	Votes	%
Yes	504,306	60.27
No	332,496	39.73
Total votes	836,802	100
Turnout	{{{votes}}}	59.41%

== Other elections ==
Coinciding with the primaries, elections were held to elect both the Democratic and Republican committeemen for the suburban townships.

== See also ==
- 1990 Illinois elections
