= Cook County Clerk =

County clerk of Cook County, Illinois

- Incumbent; Monica Gordon since December 2024
- Term length: 4 years
- Formation: March 1831 (appointed position); August 1837 (elected position)

The Cook County Clerk is the clerk of county government in Cook County, Illinois. The clerk serves the Cook County Board of Commissioners, registers vital records and deeds, and oversees elections. It is a county-wide elected office with a four year term.

== History ==
The office of Cook County Clerk was established in 1831, the year that Cook County, Illinois was created. For the first several years, the clerk was appointed by the three-member Cook County Board of Commissioners. This was changed, and it became an elected office with a four-year term in 1837, with the first election being held in August of that year.

== Officeholders ==
#	Clerk	Term in office	Party	Notes	Cite
1st	William Lee	1831		Appointed in March 1831, resigned in December 1831	
2nd	Richard J. Hamilton	1831–1837	Democratic	Appointed to the office in December 1831	
3rd	George Davis	1837–1849		The first elected Cook County Clerk (first elected in August 1837)	
4th	Edmund S. Kimberly	1849–1853		Elected in August and November 1849	
5th	Charles B. Farwell	1853–1861			
6th	Laurin P. Hilliard	1861–1865			
7th	Edward S. Salomon	1865–November 1869	Republican		
8th	John G. Gindele	1869–January 1872		Died in office	
9th	George W. Wheeler	1873–December 1873			
10th	Hermann Lieb	1873–December 1877			
11th	Ernest F.C. Klokke	1877–December 1882		Term extended, by law, for one year	
12th	Michael W. Ryan	1882–December 1886			
13th	Henry Wulff	1886–1894	Republican		
14th	Philip Knopf	1894–1902	Republican		
15th	Peter B. Olsen	1902–1906	Republican		
16th	Joseph F. Haas	1906–1910	Republican		
17th	Robert Sweitzer	December 1910–December 1934	Democratic	Elected in 1910, 1914, 1918, 1922, 1926, 1930, 1934; resigned to serve as Cook County Treasurer in December 1934	
18th	Michael J. Flynn	1935–1950	Democratic	Appointed in 1935; elected in 1938, 1942, 1946	
19th	Richard J. Daley	December 1950 – 1955	Democratic	Elected in 1950 and 1954; resigned in 1955 to serve as mayor of Chicago	
20th	Edward J. Barrett	1955–1973	Democratic	Appointed in 1955; elected in 1958, 1962, 1966, 1970; resigned in 1973	
21st	Stanley Kusper	1973–December 1990	Democratic	Appointed in 1973, elected in 1974, 1978, 1982, 1986	
22nd	David Orr	December 1990–December 2018	Democratic	Elected in 1990, 1994, 1998, 2002, 2006, 2010, 2014	
23rd	Karen Yarbrough	December 2018–April 2024	Democratic	Elected in 2018 and 2022; died in office in April 2024	
–	Cedric Giles (acting)	2024		Acting clerk	
24th	Monica Gordon	December 2024–present	Democratic	Elected in 2024	

== Recent election results ==
Cook County Clerk general elections
Year	Winning candidate	Party	Vote (pct)	Opponent	Party	Vote (pct)	Opponent	Party	Vote (pct)	Opponent	Party	Vote (pct)
1986	Stanley Kusper	Democratic	929,949 (68.35%)	Diana Nelson	Republican	430,568 (31.35%)						
1990	David D. Orr	Democratic	799,884 (63.48%)	Sam Panayotovich	Republican	353,531 (28.06%)	Heldia R. Richardson	Harold Washington Party	106,588 (8.46%)			
1994	David D. Orr	Democratic		Edward Howlett	Republican		Herman W. Baker, Jr.	Harold Washington Party		Curtis Jones	Populist	
1998	David D. Orr	Democratic	988,136 (77.30%)	Judie A. Jones	Republican	290,256 (22.70%)						
2002	David D. Orr	Democratic	992,441 (76.11%)	Kathleen A. Thomas	Republican	311,552 (23.89%)						
2006	David D. Orr	Democratic	1,034,263 (80.78%)	Nancy Carlson	Republican	246,044 (19.22%)						
2010	David D. Orr	Democratic	1,047,462 (77.77%)	Angel Garcia	Republican	299,449 (22.23%)						
2014	David D. Orr	Democratic	1,061,515 (100%)									
2018	Karen Yarbrough	Democratic	1,415,244 (99.07%)	Others	Write-ins	13,120 (0.93%)						
2022	Karen Yarbrough	Democratic	1,003,854 (71.58%)	Tony Peraica	Republican	368,095 (26.26%)	Joseph Schreiner	Libertarian	30,514 (2.18%)			
2024
