= Cook County Assessor =

County clerk of Cook County, Illinois

Cook County Clerk
- Incumbent; Fritz Kaegi since December 2018
- Term length: 4 years
- Inaugural holder: J.L. Jacobs
- Formation: 1932

The Cook County Assessor is the assessor and county government officer of Cook County, Illinois.

== Office description ==
Before the creation of the position of Cook County Assessor in 1932, the Cook County Board of Assessors completed assessments in Cook County. The Board of Assessors had been created after a law passed by the Illinois General Assembly on February 25, 1898 created a Board of Assessors in counties with 125,000 or more inhabitants. The board had five members, with a rule that no more than four could reside in the same city.

After an apparent fourteen-month delay in determining the 1931 assessment, it was decided that the structure of assessment in Cook County, with a five-member board of assessors and three-member Cook County Board of Review, needed to be restructured.

On February 13, 1932, the Illinois General Assembly passed a law that in counties of 250,000 or more, the governor and the presidents of those counties' board of commissioners would appoint an Assessor to hold office until either the first Monday in December 1932, or until a successor could otherwise be elected.

The first election for the office of Cook County Assessor took place in November 1934 for a four-year term. The Board of Assessors was disestablished once the new assessor took office.

== Officeholders ==
Asessor	Term in office	Party	Notes	Cite
J.L. Jacobs	1932–1934		Appointed in 1932	
John S. Clark	1934–1954	Democratic	Elected in 1934, 1938, 1942, 1946, 1950	
Frank Keenan	1954–1958		Elected in 1954	
John McGuane	1958–1958			
P. J. Cullerton	1958–1974	Democratic		
Thomas M. Tully	1974–1978			
Thomas C. Hynes	1978–1997	Democratic	Elected in 1978, 1982, 1986, 1990, 1994; resigned in 1997	
James Houlihan	1997–2010	Democratic	Appointed in 1997; elected in 1998, 2002, 2006	
Joseph Berrios	December 6, 2010–December 3, 2018	Democratic	Elected in 2010 and 2014; lost renomination in 2018	
Fritz Kaegi	December 3, 2018–present	Democratic	Elected in 2018 and 2022	

== Recent election results ==
Cook County Assessor general elections
Year	Winning candidate	Party	Vote (pct)	Opponent	Party	Vote (pct)	Opponent	Party	Vote (pct)	Opponent	Party	Vote (pct)
1986	Thomas C. Hynes	Democratic	969,500 (357,758%)	Le Roy M. Graham	Republican	357,758 (26.95%)						
1990	Thomas C. Hynes	Democratic	775,493 (62.05%)	Ronald Bean	Republican	333,325 (26.67%)	Donald Pamon	Harold Washington Party	141,015 (11.28%)			
1994	Thomas C. Hynes	Democratic		Sandra C. Wilson-Muriel	Republican		Donald Pamon	Harold Washington Party		Loretha Weisinger	Populist	
1998	James Houlihan	Democratic	926,646 (75.58%)	Jose Carlos Gomez	Republican	260,245 (21.23%)	Philip Morris	Justice Party	39,111 (3.19%)			
2002	James Houlihan	Democratic	954,774 (75.78%)	James P. Pieczonka	Republican	305,176 (24.22%)						
2006	James Houlihan	Democratic	1,010,400 (80.41%)	Ralph Conner	Republican	246,186 (19.59%)						
2010	Joseph Berrios	Democratic	648,053 (48.03%)	Forrest Claypool	Independent	427,842 (31.71%)	Sharon Strobeck-Eckersall	Republican	237,955 (17.64%)			
2014	Joseph Berrios	Democratic	960,435 (100%)									
2018	Fritz Kaegi	Democratic	1,272,651 (76.19%)	Joseph Paglia	Republican	397,741 (23.81%)						
2022	Fritz Kaegi	Democratic	1,063,188 (82.31%)	Nico Tsatsoulis	Libertarian	228,425 (17.69%)						
