= Wilson Frost =

American lawyer

- Frost, photographed in 1974

Commissioner of the Cook County Board of Appeals
- In office 1986–1998 Serving with Harry H. Semrow (1986–1987); Thomas A. Jaconetty (1988); Joseph Berrios (1988–1998)
- Preceded by: Pat Quinn
- Succeeded by: board reorganized

Chicago Alderman
- In office 1971–1987
- Preceded by: Rex Sande
- Succeeded by: Lemuel Austin
- Constituency: 34th Ward
- In office April 1967 – February 1971
- Preceded by: Samuel Yaksic
- Succeeded by: Bennett Stewart
- Constituency: 21st Ward

Personal details
- Born: Wilson Lee Frost; December 27, 1925 Cairo, Illinois, U.S.
- Died: May 5, 2018 (aged 92) Palm Desert, California, U.S.
- Party: Democratic Party
- Spouse: Gloria Frost (m. 1951)
- Children: 4
- Education: Phillips Academy High School
- Alma mater: Fisk University; Chicago-Kent College of Law

Wilson Lee Frost (December 27, 1925 – May 5, 2018) was an American politician from Chicago, Illinois. For 20 years (1967–1987), Frost was a member of the Chicago City Council, and for twelve years (1986–1998) he was a member on the Cook County Board of Appeals (which was subsequently restructured into the modern Cook County Board of Review). On the city council, Frost initially represented the city's 21st ward for four years (1967–1971), representing the 34th ward for the remainder of his time on the council (1971–1987).

In December 1976, Frost attempted to assume office as interim mayor of Chicago following the death in office of mayor Richard J. Daley, asserting that his position as the city council's president pro tempore made him Daley's successor. Had Frost successfully established this claim, he would have served as the city's first African-American mayor.

== Early life and education ==
Wilson Lee Frost was born the middle of four children on December 27, 1925, in Cairo, Illinois to Freddie (née Bond; 1901–1970) and General Frost (1900–1935). Freddie met General at church and the two married in 1919. General worked for the railroad and Freddie worked as a homemaker. After a flooding in Cairo, Frost family relocated to Chicago, Illinois when he was six months old. Frost family moved to the Bronzeville neighborhood on the south side. Once moving to Bronzeville, Frost enrolled at Doolittle Elementary School where he played all the school's sport teams. After graduating from Doolittle in June 1939, Frost began attending Wendell Phillips High School, a predominately black public high school that following September.

At Phillips, Frost played junior varsity basketball and ran track. In addition to school sports, Frost played with the Chicago Junior Cardinals, a local junior league football team sponsored by the Chicago Sun-times newspaper. Frost graduated from Phillips in June 1943. In September 1943, Frost enrolled in Wilson Junior College (now known as Kennedy-King College) to study accounting. While attending Wilson, Frost was drafted into World War II in April 1944. After being discharged, Frost begin work as a clerical worker in the public debt bureau of the United States Department of the Treasury. Frost began attending Fisk University in January 1946 where he became a member of Kappa Alpha Psi fraternity. After college, Frost returned to Chicago and went on to attend Chicago-Kent College of Law, where he received his law degree (graduating in 1958). Frost was admitted to the Illinois bar, and practiced law in Chicago.

== Chicago alderman (1967–1987) ==
From 1967 until 1987, Frost served as an alderman (member) of the Chicago City Council. For much of his tenure, he was the council's leading African American member.

While on the council, Frost also served as a committeeman of the Democratic Party.

=== Term as the 21st ward alderman (1967–1971) ===
Frost was first elected as an alderman in April 1967, beating incumbent alderman Samuel Yaksic, a white Republican, representing the 21st Ward which was 80% African-American. Frost was a "Regular Democrat" (as opposed to a reform Democrat).

=== 1971 re-election loss, and appointment as the 34th ward alderman ===
In February 1971, Frost lost reelection as 21st Ward alderman, being unseated by Bennett Stewart. Later that year, Frost rejoined the council after being appointed by Mayor Daley to fill the 34th ward vacancy left by the retirement of longtime alderman Rex Sande (who had been on the council since 1959). Frost's new ward had been recently redrawn to assume much of the territory previously in the 33rd ward.

=== President pro-tempore (1973–1976) ===
In 1973, Frost was voted by his fellow councilors to serve as the body's president pro tempore. He told the Chicago Tribune at the time that he was seeking the position in hopes that by holding that office he could aspire other African Americans to seek public office. He was voted into this role as a reward for his loyal service to the Cook County Democratic Party's machine, which was headed by mayor Richard J. Daley.

=== Mayoral succession dispute (December 1976) ===
Mayor Daley died in office on December 20, 1976. Hours later, Frost declared that he was now acting mayor by virtue of his office as president pro tempore of the city council, citing his interpretation of the city charter. He had been urged to make this declaration by a group of leading black political figures in Chicago, chief among them Jesse Jackson. However, the majority of Chicagoans in the mid-1970s were highly resistant to the prospect of having a black mayor, and the city's power brokers were even more so against it. Daley's chief of staff Thomas Donovan instructed loyalists of the late mayor to disagree with Frost's claim to the mayoralty, and had Frost literally locked-out of the mayor's office at City Hall. Frost was told that the keys could not be found. During this dispute, a number of community activists, ministers, civil rights activists, and newspaper publishers had supported Frost in his claim of being acting mayor.

On December 21, some of the city's leaders met in Daley's office and decided that the would have the council meet on December 28 to vote for an interim mayor that could serve until a special election would be held six months later. They agreed that until the council appointed an acting mayor, Frost (remaining mayor pro tempore) would preside over the city's legislative matters, and that deputy mayor Kenneth Sain would temporarily oversee the city's administrative matters. Additionally, William Quinlan (the city's corporation counsel) expressed their opinion that neither Frost nor anyone else could become acting mayor until the city council voted them as such.

On December 22, approximately 200 of the city's leading African American community members met and unanimously endorsed Frost for acting mayor. Some of them alleged that corporation counsel Quinlan had been acting on racial prejudice against Frost when he opined that Frost had not automatically become acting mayor. Frost informed the African American community leaders that he would make himself a candidate for the position. The same day however, allies of councilman Edward Vrdolyak (the chair of the finance committee) publicly claimed that Vrdolyak had enough pledged support among members of the council to be appointed acting mayor.

On December 23 reports arose that Vrdolyak would be supporting alderman Michael A. Bilandic for acting mayor, and Vrdolyak announced that he would not be a candidate for acting mayor. On December 24, it was claimed that Bilandic had secured the backing of a majority of counsel members. That same day, members of the Cook County Bar Association (a black lawyers association) threatened that if Frost did not become acting mayor, they would potentially seek legal action to enjoin anyone else from assuming the position.

The power struggle lasted several days, resolving itself in a compromise under which the entirely-Democratic city council determined that Frost was incorrect in his claim and appointed alderman Michael A. Bilandic to serve as acting mayor. This compromise was negotiated both inside Donovan's office at city hall and the law firm office of alderman Edward M. Burke. To appease African-American voters, Frost was given the powerful position of chairman of the Finance Committee, replacing Edward Vrdolyak. This chairmanship carried some real power, as opposed to the president pro tempore which was a titular head. Vrdolyak became the new president pro tempore. To clarify the mayoral succession process going forward, the new position of vice mayor was created. Its holder is to serve as interim acting mayor if vacancies occur. To appease the council's grouping of Polish American aldermen, this position was given to Casey Laskowski. In return for being made acting mayor, Bilandic would promise not to run in the subsequent special election.

Jesse Jackson had planned to hold an unofficial "swearing-in" ceremony for Frost on December 25. However, Frost ultimately did not show up at this event. The following day, many of the African American leaders learned that Frost had accepted the aforementioned compromise and no longer intended vy for the position of acting mayor. This dismayed a number of these leaders.

On December 28 (eight days after Daley's death), Bilandic was approved by the City Council to serve as acting mayor. No other candidates challenged him. While the vote was preceded by fiery debate, Dick Simpson and Martin J. Oberman were ultimately the sole alderman to cast dissenting votes on Bilandic's appointment. Frost had opted against giving an angry speech to the council during its debate on Bilandic's appointment. This was despite many of those who had supported his claim to the acting mayoralty hoping he would give such a passionate speech. Instead, Frost struck a reconciliatory tone, saying that he was acting in the city's best interest by agreeing to the brokered compromise. He was accused by some of his previous supporters of selling out, and was derided by some as "Tom" Frost (a reference to the epithet "Uncle Tom"). At the same meeting that it appointed Bilandic, the council also voted for the other aspects of the compromise: naming Frost as chairman of the finance committee, Vrdolyak as president pro tempore, and Laskowski as vice mayor.

One week after becoming acting mayor, Bilandic reneged on his promise not to seek election in the special election, and announced that he would be open to running if drafted to do so.

=== Activities during the Bilandic and Byrne mayoralties (1977–1983) ===
As chair of the Finance Committee, Frost was the highest-ranking African American member of the council.

In mid-April 1983, an attorney representing Frost filed a motion requesting that U.S. District Court judge Nicholas J. Bua reconsider his Shakman Decree order entered on April 4. Shakman Decrees (the first of which had been entered issued in 1972) prohibited the city from harassing, demoting, or firing municipal employees on the basis of political beliefs or activities. Bua's April 4, 1983 extension of its scope mandated that the city to submit a plan of action for ending its practice of patronage hiring.

=== Activities during the Washington mayoralty and "Council Wars" (1983–1987) ===
Harold Washington was elected mayor of Chicago in 1983, winning a general election after first securing an upset victory in the Democratic primary election over Mayor Byrne and Richard M. Daley (the son of the late Richard J. Daley). After Washington's win the primary, Frost's relationship soured with a number of white council members aligned with the Cook County political machine. While Frost had previously established good relationships with Burke and Vrdolyak, this discontinued.

During the "Council Wars" that took place between 1983 and 1986 (the majority of Washington's mayoralty), Frost (like all other African American aldermen) aligned himself with the council's pro-Washington faction. Opposition to Washington was led by Vrdolyak and Burke, included many of the same members of the former Richard J. Daley political machine who had in 1971 denied Frost the opportunity to assume the mayoralty.

== Cook County Board of Appeals (1986–1998) ==
In November 1986, Frost was elected to the Cook County Board of Appeals. He succeeded fellow Democrat Pat Quinn (who had forgone reelection in 1986 in order to unsuccessfully run for state treasurer). Frost was reelected in 1990 and 1994.

Initially serving alongside Frost on the two-member body was Harry H. Semrow, an incumbent who had been reelected in 1986. Semrow died in office in November 1987. Thomas A. Jaconetty (a deputy assessor) was appointed as a temporary replacement by the chief judge of the Cook County Circuit Court. Jaconetty was a member of the Chicago 31st Ward Democratic organization, which was chaired by Joseph Berrios. Berrios ran in the special election the next year to fill Semrow's seat, receiving the backing of the Democratic party organization. Berrios served alongside Frost on the board for the remainder of Frost's tenure.

Wilson retired from the office in 1998, after which time the two-member Cook County Board of Appeals was statutorily mandated to be reorganized as the three-member Cook County Board of Review.

== Nonprofit work ==
Frost was also involved in work at nonprofits, including the Mercy Hospital and Medical Center as well as the City Club of Chicago (which he served as vice president of).

== Death ==
Frost died on May 5, 2018, in Palm Desert, California, at the age of 92.

Frost was married once, to Gloria Frost from 1951 to his death. Together, they had four children.
