= 2006 Cook County, Illinois, elections =

- November 7, 2006
- Turnout: 49.85%

The Cook County, Illinois, general election was held on November 7, 2006.

Primaries were held March 21, 2006.

Elections were held for Assessor, Clerk, Sheriff, Treasurer, President of the Cook County Board of Commissioners, all 17 seats of the Cook County Board of Commissioners, Cook County Board of Review districts 1 and 2, three seats on the Water Reclamation District Board, judgeships in the Circuit Court of Cook County.

== Election information ==
2006 was a midterm election year in the United States. The primaries and general elections for Cook County races coincided with those for congressional and those for state elections.

=== Voter turnout ===
==== Primary election ====
Voter turnout in Cook County during the primaries was 28.44%, with 762,273 ballots cast. The city of Chicago saw 32.05% turnout and suburban Cook County saw 26.70% turnout.

Vote totals of primaries
| Primary | Chicago vote totals | Suburban Cook County vote totals | Total Cook County vote totals |
|---|---|---|---|
| Democratic | 390,891 | 228,418 | 619,309 |
| Republican | 24,599 | 113,583 | 138,182 |
| Green | 0 | 8 | 8 |
| Libertarian | 6 | 9 | 15 |
| Honesty & Integrity | 0 | 6 | 6 |
| Nonpartisan | 807 | 4,753 | 5,560 |
| Total | 416,303 | 346,777 | 763,080 |

==== General election ====
The general election saw 49.85% turnout, with 1,350,918 ballots cast. The city of Chicago saw 49.25% turnout and suburban Cook County saw 50.45% turnout.

== Assessor ==
2006 Cook County Assessor election
- November 7, 2006
- Turnout: 46.37%

| Nominee | James Houlihan | Ralph Conner |
| Party | Democratic | Republican |
| Popular vote | 1,010,400 | 246,186 |
| Percentage | 80.41% | 19.59% |
Assessor before election
James Houlihan
Democratic
Elected Assessor
James Houlihan
Democratic

In the 2006 Cook County Assessor election, incumbent Assessor James Houlihan, a Democrat first appointed in 1997 who was reelected in 1998 and 2002, was again reelected.

=== Primaries ===
==== Democratic ====
Cook County Assessor Democratic primary
| Party | Candidate | Votes | % |
|---|---|---|---|
| Democratic | James Houlihan (incumbent) | 492,077 | 100 |
| Total votes | | 492,077 | 100 |

==== Republican ====
Cook County Assessor Republican primary
| Party | Candidate | Votes | % |
|---|---|---|---|
| Republican | Ralph Conner | 101,053 | 100 |
| Total votes | | 101,053 | 100 |

=== General election ===
Cook County Assessor election
| Party | Candidate | Votes | % |
|---|---|---|---|
| Democratic | James Houlihan (incumbent) | 1,010,400 | 80.41 |
| Republican | Ralph Conner | 246,186 | 19.59 |
| Total votes | | 1,256,586 | 100 |

== Clerk ==
2006 Cook County Clerk election
- November 7, 2006
- Turnout: 47.24%
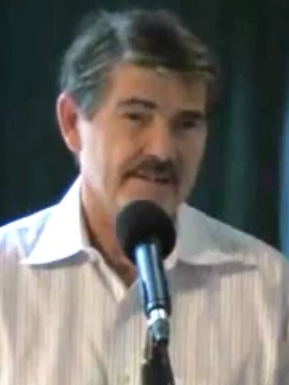

| Candidate | David Orr | Nancy Carlson |
| Party | Democratic | Republican |
| Popular vote | 1,034,263 | 246,044 |
| Percentage | 80.78% | 19.22% |
Clerk before election
David Orr
Democratic
Elected Clerk
David Orr
Democratic

In the 2006 Cook County Clerk election, incumbent fourth-term Clerk David Orr, a Democrat, was reelected.

=== Primaries ===
==== Democratic ====
Cook County Clerk Democratic primary
| Party | Candidate | Votes | % |
|---|---|---|---|
| Democratic | David D. Orr (incumbent) | 520,407 | 100 |
| Total votes | | 520,407 | 100 |

==== Republican ====
Cook County Clerk Republican primary
| Party | Candidate | Votes | % |
|---|---|---|---|
| Republican | Nancy Carlson | 103,878 | 100 |
| Total votes | | 103,878 | 100 |

=== General election ===
Cook County Clerk election
| Party | Candidate | Votes | % |
|---|---|---|---|
| Democratic | David D. Orr (incumbent) | 1,034,263 | 80.78 |
| Republican | Nancy Carlson | 246,044 | 19.22 |
| Total votes | | 1,280,307 | 100 |

== Sheriff ==
2006 Cook County Sheriff election
- November 7, 2006
- Turnout: 46.53%

| Candidate | Tom Dart | Peter Garza |
| Party | Democratic | Republican |
| Popular vote | 942,113 | 319,011 |
| Percentage | 74.70% | 25.30% |
Sheriff before election
Michael F. Sheahan
Democratic
Elected Sheriff
Tom Dart
Democratic

In the 2006 Cook County Sheriff election, incumbent fourth-term Sheriff Michael F. Sheahan, a Democrat, did not seek reelection. Democrat Tom Dart was elected to succeed him.

=== Primaries ===
==== Democratic ====
Cook County Sheriff Democratic primary
| Party | Candidate | Votes | % |
|---|---|---|---|
| Democratic | Thomas J. Dart | 331,318 | 61.91 |
| Democratic | Sylvester E. Baker, Jr. | 133,944 | 25.03 |
| Democratic | Richard L. Remus | 69,899 | 13.06 |
| Total votes | | 535,161 | 100 |

==== Republican ====
Cook County Sheriff Republican primary
| Party | Candidate | Votes | % |
|---|---|---|---|
| Republican | Peter Garza | 102,795 | 100 |
| Total votes | | 102,795 | 100 |

=== General election ===
Cook County Sheriff election
| Party | Candidate | Votes | % |
|---|---|---|---|
| Democratic | Thomas J. Dart | 942,113 | 74.70 |
| Republican | Peter Garza | 319,011 | 25.30 |
| Total votes | | 1,261,124 | 100 |

== Treasurer ==
2006 Cook County Treasurer election
- November 7, 2006
- Turnout: 47.38%
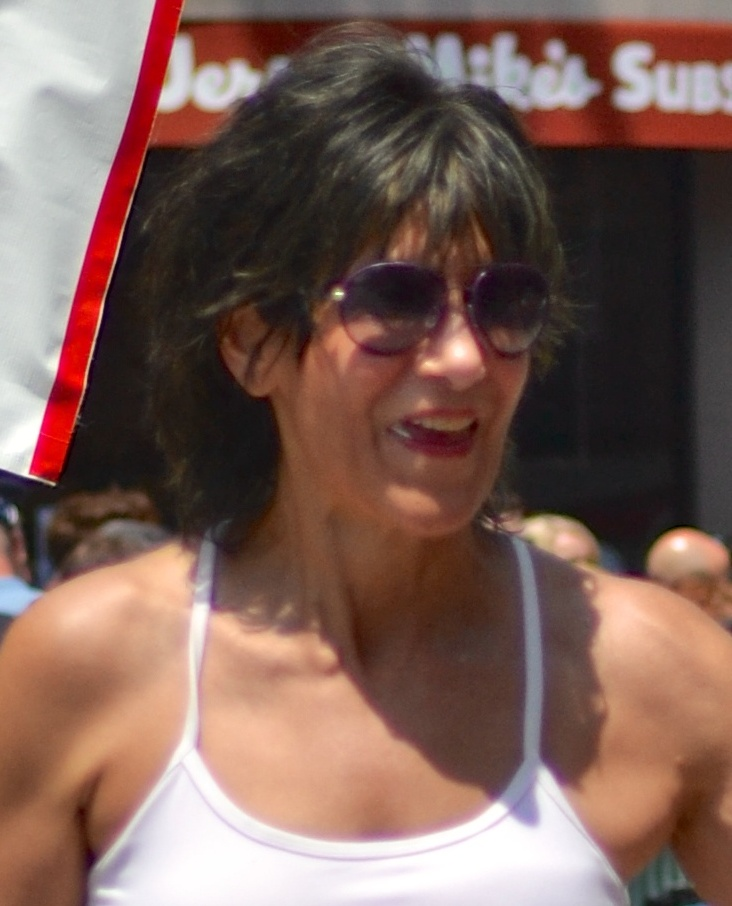

| Candidate | Maria Pappas | Erik Peck |
| Party | Democratic | Republican |
| Popular vote | 1,074,756 | 209,253 |
| Percentage | 83.70% | 16.30% |
Treasurer before election
Maria Pappas
Democratic
Elected Treasurer
Maria Pappas
Democratic

In the 2006 Cook County Treasurer election, incumbent second-term Treasurer Maria Pappas, a Democrat, was reelected.

=== Primaries ===
==== Democratic ====
Cook County Treasurer Democratic primary
| Party | Candidate | Votes | % |
|---|---|---|---|
| Democratic | Maria Pappas (incumbent) | 521,488 | 100 |
| Total votes | | 521,488 | 100 |

==== Republican ====
Cook County Treasurer Republican primary
| Party | Candidate | Votes | % |
|---|---|---|---|
| Republican | Erik Peck | 101,372 | 100 |
| Total votes | | 101,372 | 100 |

=== General election ===
Cook County Treasurer election
| Party | Candidate | Votes | % |
|---|---|---|---|
| Democratic | Maria Pappas (incumbent) | 1,074,756 | 83.70 |
| Republican | Erik Peck | 209,253 | 16.30 |
| Total votes | | 1,284,009 | 100 |

== President of the Cook County Board of Commissioners ==
2006 President of the Cook County Board of Commissioners election
- November 7, 2006
- Turnout: 47.50%
| Nominee | Todd Stroger | Tony Peraica |
| Party | Democratic | Republican |
| Popular vote | 690,945 | 596,212 |
| Percentage | 53.68% | 46.32% |
President before election
John Stroger (before primary)/
Bobbie L. Steele (before general election)
Democratic
Elected President
Todd Stroger
Democratic

In the 2006 President of the Cook County Board of Commissioners election, incumbent President Todd Stroger, a Democrat appointed following the resignation of his father John Stroger, was elected to a full term. Originally, then-incumbent John Stroger had been running for reelection, winning the Democratic primary, before backing-out and also resigning from the presidency.

=== Primaries ===
==== Democratic ====
President of the Cook County Board of Commissioners Democratic primary
| Party | Candidate | Votes | % |
|---|---|---|---|
| Democratic | John H. Stroger, Jr. (incumbent) | 318,634 | 53.52 |
| Democratic | Forrest Claypool | 276,682 | 46.48 |
| Total votes | | 595,316 | 100 |

==== Republican ====
President of the Cook County Board of Commissioners Republican primary
| Party | Candidate | Votes | % |
|---|---|---|---|
| Republican | Tony Peraica | 104,807 | 100 |
| Total votes | | 104,807 | 100 |

=== General election ===
Suffering health ailments, John Stroger was removed from the ticket in June and replaced by his son Todd Stroger. John Stroger retired in August, and Bobbie L. Steele was appointed to fill out the remainder of his unexpired term.

President of the Cook County Board of Commissioners election
| Party | Candidate | Votes | % |
|---|---|---|---|
| Democratic | Todd H. Stroger | 690,945 | 53.68 |
| Republican | Tony Peraica | 596,212 | 46.32 |
| Total votes | | 1,287,157 | 100 |

== Cook County Board of Commissioners ==
2006 Cook County Board of Commissioners election
- November 7, 2006

All 17 seats on the Cook County Board of Commissioners 9 seats needed for a majority
| | First party | Second party |
|---|---|---|
| Party | Democratic | Republican |
| Seats before | 12 | 5 |
| Seats won | 12 | 5 |
| Seat change | Steady | Steady |
| Popular vote | 924,939 | 276,925 |
| Percentage | 76.45% | 22.89% |
| Swing | ▲1.90% | ▼2.56% |

The 2006 Cook County Board of Commissioners election saw all seventeen seats of the Cook County Board of Commissioners up for election to four-year terms.

Fifteen members were reelected. One incumbent Democrat withdrew from their election after being renominated, while one incumbent Republican lost his primary. No seat changed parties.

== Cook County Board of Review ==
2006 Cook County Board of Review election
- November 7, 2006

2 of 3 seats on the Cook County Board of Review 2 seats needed for a majority
| | First party | Second party |
|---|---|---|
| Party | Democratic | Republican |
| Seats before | 2 | 1 |
| Seats after | 3 | 0 |
| Seat change | ▲1 | ▼1 |
| Seats up | 1 | 1 |
| Races won | 2 | 0 |

In the 2006 Cook County Board of Review election, two seats, one Democratic-held and one Republican-held, out of its three seats were up for election.

The Cook County Board of Review has its three seats rotate the length of terms. In a staggered fashion (in which no two seats have coinciding two-year terms), the seats rotate between two consecutive four-year terms and a two-year term.

=== 1st district ===
Incumbent second-term member Maureen Murphy, a Republican last reelected in 2002, lost reelection to Democrat Brendan F. Houlihan. This election was to a four-year term.

==== Primaries ====
===== Democratic =====
No candidates, ballot-certified or formal write-in, ran in the Democratic primary. Incumbent Republican Maureen Murphy successfully challenged the nomination petitions of the only Democrat running, Brendan Houlihan, meaning that he was removed from the Democratic primary ballot. However, since, consequentially no candidate appeared on the ballot in the Democratic primary, state law enabled the Democratic committeemen from the Board of Review's 1st district to pick a nominee. They ultimately selected Houlihan as their nominee.

===== Republican =====
Cook County Board of Review 1st district Republican primary
| Party | Candidate | Votes | % |
|---|---|---|---|
| Republican | Maureen Murphy (incumbent) | 76,100 | 100 |
| Total votes | | 76,100 | 100 |

==== General election ====
Cook County Board of Review 1st district election
| Party | Candidate | Votes | % |
|---|---|---|---|
| Democratic | Brendan F. Houlihan | 245,227 | 51.48 |
| Republican | Maureen Murphy (incumbent) | 231,153 | 48.52 |
| Total votes | | 476,380 | 100 |

=== 2nd district ===
Incumbent second-term member Joseph Berrios, a Democrat last reelected in 2002, was reelected. Berrios had not only served since the Board of Review was constituted in 1998, but had also served on its predecessor organization, the Cook County Board of (Tax) Appeals, for ten years. This election was to a two-year term.

==== Primaries ====
===== Democratic =====
Cook County Board of Review 2nd district Democratic primary
| Party | Candidate | Votes | % |
|---|---|---|---|
| Democratic | Joseph Berrios (incumbent) | 132,358 | 100 |
| Total votes | | 132,358 | 100 |

===== Republican =====
No candidates, ballot-certified or formal write-in, ran in the Republican primary.

==== General election ====
Cook County Board of Review 2nd district election
| Party | Candidate | Votes | % |
|---|---|---|---|
| Democratic | Joseph Berrios (incumbent) | 294,148 | 100 |
| Total votes | | 294,148 | 100 |

== Water Reclamation District Board ==
2006 Metropolitan Water Reclamation District of Greater Chicago election
- November 7, 2006

3 of 9 seats on the Metropolitan Water Reclamation District of Greater Chicago 5 seats needed for a majority
| | First party |
|---|---|
| Party | Democratic |
| Seats before | 9 |
| Seats after | 9 |
| Seat change | Steady |
| Popular vote | 2,190,565 |
| Percentage | 100% |
| Seats up | 3 |
| Races won | 3 |

In the 2006 Metropolitan Water Reclamation District of Greater Chicago election, three of the nine seats on the Metropolitan Water Reclamation District of Greater Chicago board were up for election in an at-large race. Since three six-year seats were up for election, voters could vote for up to three candidates and the top-three finishers would win.

Incumbent commissioner, Democrat Terrence J. O'Brien, was reelected. Winners also included newly-elected Democrats Debra Shore and Patricia Horton. The two incumbents who did not seek reelection were James Harris and Harry Yourell.

=== Primaries ===
==== Democratic ====
Water Reclamation District Board election Democratic primary
| Party | Candidate | Votes | % |
|---|---|---|---|
| Democratic | Debra Shore | 225,051 | 17.30 |
| Democratic | Terrence J. O'Brien (incumbent) | 215,757 | 16.59 |
| Democratic | Patricia Horton | 165,669 | 12.74 |
| Democratic | James "Jim" Harris | 162,951 | 12.53 |
| Democratic | Frank Avila | 149,299 | 11.48 |
| Democratic | Dean T. Maragos | 114,683 | 8.82 |
| Democratic | Lewis W. Powell, III | 110,335 | 8.48 |
| Democratic | Barrett F. Pedersen | 92,293 | 7.10 |
| Democratic | Boguslaw "Bogie" Stefanski | 64,580 | 4.97 |
| Total votes | | 1,300,618 | 100 |

==== Republican ====
No candidates, ballot-certified or formal write-in, ran in the Republican primary.

=== General election ===
Water Reclamation District Board election
| Party | Candidate | Votes | % |
|---|---|---|---|
| Democratic | Debra Shore | 864,967 | 39.49 |
| Democratic | Terrence J. O'Brien (incumbent) | 680,723 | 31.08 |
| Democratic | Patricia Horton | 644,875 | 29.44 |
| Total votes | | 2,190,565 | 100 |

== Judicial elections ==
Partisan elections were held for 27 judgeships on the Circuit Court of Cook County, due to vacancies. Other judgeships had retention elections.

Partisan elections were also held for 15 subcircuit courts judgeships due to vacancies. Other judgeships had retention elections.

== Other elections ==
Coinciding with the primaries, elections were held to elect both the Democratic and Republican committeemen for the suburban townships.

== See also ==
- 2006 Illinois elections
