= Bridget Gainer =

American politician

Member of the Cook County Board of Commissioners from the 10th district
- Incumbent
- Assumed office April 12, 2009
- Preceded by: Mike Quigley

Personal details
- Born: 1968 or 1969 (age 57–58) Chicago, Illinois, U.S.
- Party: Democratic
- Children: 3
- Education: University of Illinois, Urbana-Champaign (BA); University of Chicago (MBA)

Bridget Gainer (born 1968/1969) is an American politician serving as a member of the Cook County Board of Commissioners from the 10th district. She was appointed to the position in 2009. In March 2026, she lost the Democratic primary to challenger Drake Warren.

== Early life and education ==
Gainer was born and raised in the Beverly neighborhood on Chicago's south side. In 1990, she graduated from University of Illinois at Urbana–Champaign with a Bachelor of Arts degree in English and political science. She later earned a Master of Business Administration from the University of Chicago.

== Career ==
Afterwards, she moved to New York City to work as a community organizer with the Jesuit Volunteer Corps. While in college, she worked as a cocktail waitress at Butch McGuire's on Division Street.

She moved back to Chicago in 1994 to continue her work as community organizer to work with local community members to keep schools open later in the day for after-school programming. Gainer worked for then-Mayor Richard M. Daley as a budget analyst in Chicago's City Hall. She then went on to work for the Park District as the director of the Lakefront Parks.

Gainer later went on to join Aon in a financial role.

=== Politics ===
Gainer was initially appointed to the Cook County Board of Commissioners in April 2009 to replace former commissioner Mike Quigley, who won the special election to fill former Congressman Rahm Emanuel's seat when Emanuel left Congress to become White House Chief of Staff to President Obama. She beat out other contenders, including openly gay lawyer Jay Paul Deratany, now Alderman Michele Smith, Quigley's former Chief of Staff Kim Walz, Jim Madigan, former city attorney Sara Ellis, Democratic National Committee affiliated lawyer Robert Block, and electrician Michael Hickey.

As commissioner she ensured the CCLBA works independently from the Cook County Board earning revenue from the property sales and reinvesting into the budget to provide an infrastructure to provide additional resources for first-time home buyers and small neighborhood developers. Since the program began, 400 homes have been purchased and rehabbed.^{[3]}

In 2015, U.S. Sen. Kirsten Gillibrand and Gainer founded a Chicago chapter of Off the Sidelines, a civic impact organization for women which gained over 3,000 members.^{[7]}

In 2017, Off the Sidelines Chicago was renamed Cause the Effect Chicago.^{[9]}

== Personal life ==
Gainer has three children.^{[1]}
