= 1998 Cook County, Illinois, elections =

- November 3, 1998
- Turnout: 54.61%

The Cook County, Illinois, general election was held on November 3, 1998.

Primaries were held on March 17, 1998.

Elections were held for Assessor, Clerk, Sheriff, Treasurer, President of the Cook County Board of Commissioners, all 17 seats of the Cook County Board of Commissioners, all 3 seats of the Cook County Board of Review, 4 seats on the Water Reclamation District Board, and judgeships on the Circuit Court of Cook County.

== Election information ==
1998 was a midterm election year in the United States. The primaries and general elections for Cook County races coincided with those for federal (Senate and House) and those for state elections.

=== Voter turnout ===
==== Primary election ====
Voter turnout in Cook County during the primaries was 28.68%.

On its own, suburban Cook County saw 23.95% turnout.

Vote totals of primaries
| Primary | Chicago vote totals | Suburban Cook County vote totals | Total Cook County vote totals |
|---|---|---|---|
| Democratic | 431,146 | 182,250 | 613,396 |
| Republican | 25,783 | 136,260 | 162,043 |
| Libertarian | 38 | 25 | 63 |
| Reform | 112 | 152 | 264 |
| Nonpartisan | 531 | 4,283 | 4,814 |
| Total | 457,610 | 322,970 | 780,580 |

==== General election ====
The general election saw 54.61% turnout, with 1,433,423 ballots cast. Chicago saw 752,506 ballots cast while suburban Cook County saw 53.95% turnout (with 680,917 ballots cast).

== Assessor ==
1998 Cook County Assessor election
- November 3, 1998
- Turnout: 46.71%

| Nominee | James Houlihan | Jose Carlos Gomez |
| Party | Democratic | Republican |
| Popular vote | 926,646 | 260,245 |
| Percentage | 75.58% | 21.23% |
Assessor before election
James Houlihan
Democratic
Elected Assessor
James Houlihan
Democratic

In the 1998 Cook County Assessor election, incumbent assessor James Houlihan, a Democrat, was elected to his first full-term. Houlihan had been appointed to the office in 1997, after Thomas Hynes (who had served as Cook County assessor since 1978) opted to resign from the office.

=== Primaries ===
==== Democratic ====
Cook County Assessor Democratic primary
| Party | Candidate | Votes | % |
|---|---|---|---|
| Democratic | James M. Houlihan (incumbent) | 330,292 | 100 |
| Total votes | | 330,292 | 100 |

==== Republican ====
Cook County Assessor Republican primary
| Party | Candidate | Votes | % |
|---|---|---|---|
| Republican | Jose Carlos Gomez | 103,091 | 100 |
| Total votes | | 103,091 | 100 |

=== General election ===
Cook County Assessor election
| Party | Candidate | Votes | % |
|---|---|---|---|
| Democratic | James M. Houlihan (incumbent) | 926,646 | 75.58 |
| Republican | Jose Carlos Gomez | 260,245 | 21.23 |
| Justice Party | Philip Morris | 39,111 | 3.19 |
| Total votes | | 1,226,002 | 100 |

== Clerk ==
1998 Cook County Clerk election
- November 3, 1998
- Turnout: 48.70%
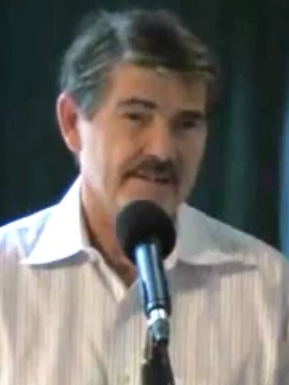

| Candidate | David Orr | Judie A. Jones |
| Party | Democratic | Republican |
| Popular vote | 988,136 | 290,256 |
| Percentage | 77.30% | 22.70% |
Clerk before election
David Orr
Democratic
Elected Clerk
David Orr
Democratic

In the 1998 Cook County Clerk election, incumbent second-term clerk David Orr, a Democrat, was reelected.

=== Primaries ===
==== Democratic ====
Cook County Clerk Democratic primary
| Party | Candidate | Votes | % |
|---|---|---|---|
| Democratic | David Orr (incumbent) | 404,839 | 100 |
| Total votes | | 404,839 | 100 |

==== Republican ====
Cook County Clerk Republican primary
| Party | Candidate | Votes | % |
|---|---|---|---|
| Republican | Judith A. "Judie" Jones | 109,540 | 100 |
| Total votes | | 109,540 | 100 |

=== General election ===
Cook County Clerk election
| Party | Candidate | Votes | % |
|---|---|---|---|
| Democratic | David Orr (incumbent) | 988,136 | 77.30 |
| Republican | Judith A. "Judie" Jones | 290,256 | 22.70 |
| Total votes | | 1,278,392 | 100 |

== Sheriff ==
1998 Cook County Sheriff election
- November 3, 1998
- Turnout: 48.38%
| Candidate | Michael F. Sheahan | LeRoy Martin |
| Party | Democratic | Republican |
| Popular vote | 903,053 | 366,867 |
| Percentage | 71.11% | 28.89% |
Sheriff before election
Michael F. Sheahan
Democratic
Elected Sheriff
Michael F. Sheahan
Democratic

In the 1998 Cook County Sheriff election, incumbent second-term sheriff Michael F. Sheahan, a Democrat, was reelected.

=== Primaries ===
==== Democratic ====
Cook County Sheriff Democratic primary
| Party | Candidate | Votes | % |
|---|---|---|---|
| Democratic | Michael F. Sheahan (incumbent) | 367,157 | 100 |
| Total votes | | 367,157 | 100 |

==== Republican ====
Former Superintendent of the Chicago Police Department LeRoy Martin won the Republican primary.

Cook County Sheriff Republican primary
| Party | Candidate | Votes | % |
|---|---|---|---|
| Republican | LeRoy Martin | 107,868 | 100 |
| Total votes | | 107,868 | 100 |

=== General election ===
Cook County Sheriff election
| Party | Candidate | Votes | % |
|---|---|---|---|
| Democratic | Michael F. Sheahan (incumbent) | 903,053 | 71.11 |
| Republican | LeRoy Martin | 366,867 | 28.89 |
| Total votes | | 1,269,920 | 100 |

== Treasurer ==
1998 Cook County Treasurer election
- November 3, 1998
- Turnout: 47.91%
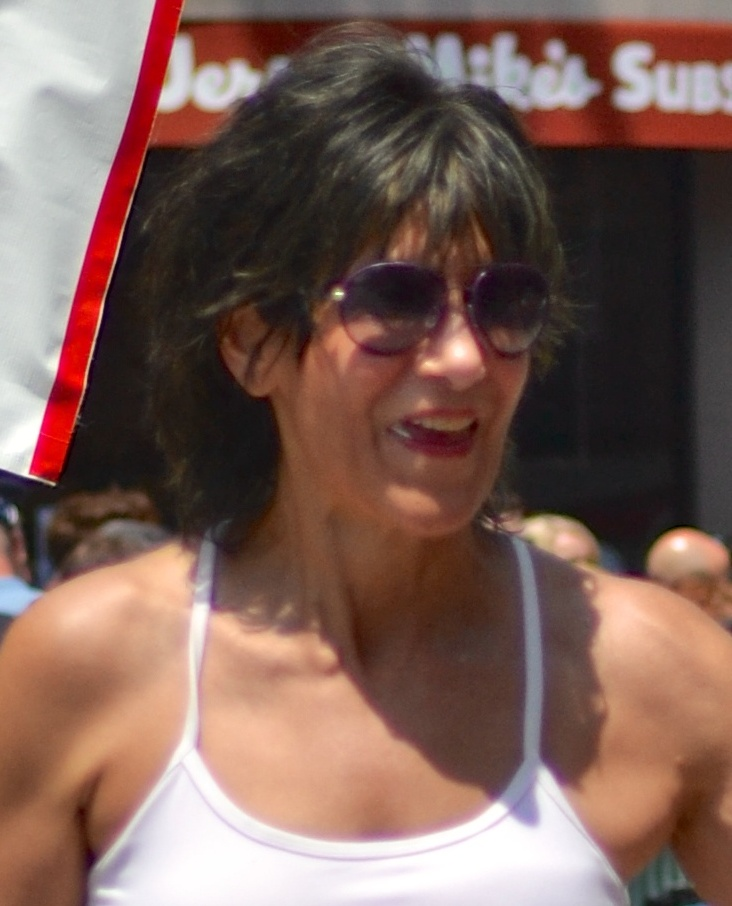

| Candidate | Maria Pappas | Anthony Peraica |
| Party | Democratic | Republican |
| Popular vote | 978,373 | 279,355 |
| Percentage | 77.79% | 22.21% |
Treasurer before election
Edward J. Rosewell
Democratic
Elected Treasurer
Maria Pappas
Democratic

In the 1998 Cook County Treasurer election, incumbent sixth-term treasurer Edward J. Rosewell, a Democrat, did not seek reelection after having been indicted over a ghost jobs scheme (for which he would ultimately plead guilty). Cook County Commissioner Maria Pappas was elected to succeed him.

=== Primaries ===
==== Democratic ====
Cook County Treasurer Democratic primary
| Party | Candidate | Votes | % |
|---|---|---|---|
| Democratic | Maria Pappas (incumbent) | 332,547 | 70.43 |
| Democratic | Thomas Murphy | 139,634 | 29.57 |
| Total votes | | 472,181 | 100 |

==== Republican ====
Cook County Treasurer Republican primary
| Party | Candidate | Votes | % |
|---|---|---|---|
| Republican | Anthony Peraica | 106,386 | 100 |
| Total votes | | 106,386 | 100 |

=== General election ===
Cook County Treasurer election
| Party | Candidate | Votes | % |
|---|---|---|---|
| Democratic | Maria Pappas (incumbent) | 978,373 | 77.79 |
| Republican | Anthony Peraica | 279,355 | 22.21 |
| Total votes | | 1,257,728 | 100 |

== President of the Cook County Board of Commissioners ==
1998 President of the Cook County Board of Commissioners election
- November 3, 1998
- Turnout: 50.10%

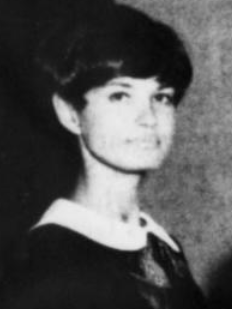
| Nominee | John Stroger | Aurelia Pucinski |
| Party | Democratic | Republican |
| Popular vote | 834,972 | 480,191 |
| Percentage | 63.49% | 36.61% |
President before election
John Stroger
Democratic
Elected President
John Stroger
Democratic

In the 1998 President of the Cook County Board of Commissioners election, incumbent first-term president John Stroger, a Democrat, was reelected.

=== Primaries ===
==== Democratic ====
Incumbent John H. Stroger, Jr. defeated Cook County commissioner Calvin R. Sutker.

President of the Cook County Board of Commissioners Democratic primary
| Party | Candidate | Votes | % |
|---|---|---|---|
| Democratic | John H. Stroger, Jr. (incumbent) | 363,670 | 72.98 |
| Democratic | Calvin R. Sutker | 134,626 | 27.02 |
| Total votes | | 498,296 | 100 |

==== Republican ====
Clerk of the Circuit Court of Cook County Aurelia Pucinski left the Democratic Party and joined the Republican party in December 1997 to run as its nominee for President of the Cook County Board of Commissioners.

President of the Cook County Board of Commissioners Republican primary
| Party | Candidate | Votes | % |
|---|---|---|---|
| Republican | Aurelia Marie Pucinski | 120,627 | 100 |
| Total votes | | 120,627 | 100 |

=== General election ===
President of the Cook County Board of Commissioners election
| Party | Candidate | Votes | % |
|---|---|---|---|
| Democratic | John H. Stroger, Jr. (incumbent) | 834,972 | 63.49 |
| Republican | Aurelia Marie Pucinski | 480,191 | 36.61 |
| Total votes | | 1,315,163 | 100 |

== Cook County Board of Commissioners ==
1998 Cook County Board of Commissioners election
- November 3, 1998

All 17 seats on the Cook County Board of Commissioners 9 seats needed for a majority
| | First party | Second party |
|---|---|---|
| Party | Democratic | Republican |
| Seats before | 11 | 6 |
| Seats won | 12 | 5 |
| Seat change | ▲1 | ▼1 |
| Popular vote | 791,445 | 332,957 |
| Percentage | 70.39% | 29.61% |

The 1998 Cook County Board of Commissioners election saw all seventeen seats of the Cook County Board of Commissioners up for election to four-year terms.

== Cook County Board of Review ==
1998 Cook County Board of Review election
- November 3, 1998

3 of 3 seats on the Cook County Board of Review 2 seats needed for a majority
| | First party | Second party |
|---|---|---|
| Party | Democratic | Republican |
| Seats after | 2 | 1 |

In the 1998 Cook County Board of Review election, all three seats were up for election. This was the first election for what would be a newly reconstituted body. In 1996, the Illinois Legislature successfully passed Public Act 89-671, which made it so that, in 1998, the Cook County Board of Appeals would be renamed Cook County Board of Review and be reconstituted as a three-member body.

All elections held in 1998 were for four-year terms.

=== 1st district ===
Republican Maureen Murphy defeated Democrat David McAfee.

==== Primaries ====
===== Democratic =====
Cook County Board of Review 1st district Democratic primary
| Party | Candidate | Votes | % |
|---|---|---|---|
| Democratic | David B. McAfee | 71,631 | 100 |
| Total votes | | 71,631 | 100 |

===== Republican =====
Cook County Board of Review 1st district Republican primary
| Party | Candidate | Votes | % |
|---|---|---|---|
| Republican | Maureen Murphy | 29,154 | 31.95 |
| Republican | Wiliam A. Darr | 18,023 | 19.75 |
| Republican | Thomas E. Walsh | 14,856 | 16.28 |
| Republican | Katie O'Brien | 13,307 | 14.58 |
| Republican | John A. Lartz | 12,003 | 13.15 |
| Republican | Mary P. Redding | 3,917 | 4.29 |
| Total votes | | 91,260 | 100 |

==== General election ====
Cook County Board of Review 1st district election
| Party | Candidate | Votes | % |
|---|---|---|---|
| Republican | Maureen Murphy (incumbent) | 272,921 | 60.76 |
| Democratic | David B. McAfee | 176,252 | 39.24 |
| Total votes | | 449,173 | 100 |

=== 2nd district ===
Joseph Berrios a ten incumbent on the predecessor organization, the Cook County Board of (Tax) Appeals, was elected, running unopposed in both the Democratic primary and general election.

==== Primaries ====
===== Democratic =====
Cook County Board of Review 2nd district Democratic primary
| Party | Candidate | Votes | % |
|---|---|---|---|
| Democratic | Joseph Berrios | 106,251 | 100 |
| Total votes | | 106,251 | 100 |

===== Republican =====
No candidates ran in the Republican primary.

==== General election ====
Cook County Board of Review 2nd district election
| Party | Candidate | Votes | % |
|---|---|---|---|
| Democratic | Joseph Berrios | 259,209 | 100 |
| Total votes | | 259,209 | 100 |

=== 3rd district ===
Robert Shaw, a Democrat, was elected.

==== Primaries ====
===== Democratic =====
Cook County Board of Review 3rd district Democratic primary
| Party | Candidate | Votes | % |
|---|---|---|---|
| Democratic | Robert Shaw | 175,973 | 84.81 |
| Democratic | Arvin Boddie | 31,514 | 15.19 |
| Total votes | | 207,487 | 100 |

===== Republican =====
No candidates ran in the Republican primary.

==== General election ====
Cook County Board of Review 3rd district election
| Party | Candidate | Votes | % |
|---|---|---|---|
| Democratic | Robert Shaw | 406,862 | 100 |
| Total votes | | 406,862 | 100 |

== Water Reclamation District Board ==
1998 Metropolitan Water Reclamation District of Greater Chicago election
- November 3, 1998

4 of 9 seats on the Metropolitan Water Reclamation District of Greater Chicago 5 seats needed for a majority
| | First party | Second party |
|---|---|---|
| Party | Democratic | Republican |
| Seats before | 9 | 1 |
| Seats after | 9 | 0 |
| Seat change | ▲1 | ▼1 |
| Popular vote | 2,762,416 | 1,300,762 |
| Percentage | 67.99% | 32.01% |
| Seats up | 3 | 1 |
| Races won | 4 | 0 |

In the 1998 Metropolitan Water Reclamation District of Greater Chicago election, four of the nine seats on the Metropolitan Water Reclamation District of Greater Chicago board were up for election. Three were regularly scheduled elections, and one was a special election due to a vacancy.

Democrats won all four seats up for election.

Democratic incumbents Gloria Alitto Majewski and Patricia Young were reelected in the at-large election.

=== At-large election ===
Three six-year term seats were up for an at-large election. Since three six-year seats were up for election, voters could vote for up to three candidates, and the top-three finishers would win.

==== Primaries ====
===== Democratic =====
Water Reclamation District Board at-large Democratic primary
| Party | Candidate | Votes | % |
|---|---|---|---|
| Democratic | Patricia Young (incumbent) | 192,440 | 17.56 |
| Democratic | Gloria Alitto Majewski (incumbent) | 170,076 | 15.52 |
| Democratic | Barbara McGowan | 154,945 | 14.14 |
| Democratic | James Patrick Sheehan | 109,485 | 9.99 |
| Democratic | Sally Johnson | 96,537 | 8.81 |
| Democratic | Josephine Fragale | 78,547 | 7.17 |
| Democratic | M. Frank Avila | 52,463 | 4.79 |
| Democratic | Robert J. Pettis | 43,704 | 3.99 |
| Democratic | Carl M. Anderson, Jr. | 40,257 | 3.67 |
| Democratic | Jerry Paszek | 36,379 | 3.32 |
| Democratic | Ronald Edward Hackett | 26,662 | 2.43 |
| Democratic | M. Sam Esteban | 17,895 | 1.63 |
| Total votes | | 1,019,390 | 100 |

===== Republican =====
Water Reclamation District Board at-large Republican primary
| Party | Candidate | Votes | % |
|---|---|---|---|
| Republican | Jack O'Connor | 91,579 | 36.07 |
| Republican | Rita L. Mullins | 86,642 | 34.12 |
| Republican | James W. "Todd" Miles | 75,678 | 29.81 |
| Total votes | | 253,899 | 100 |

==== General election ====
Water Reclamation District Board at-large election
| Party | Candidate | Votes | % |
|---|---|---|---|
| Democratic | Patricia Young (incumbent) | 724,404 | 24.14 |
| Democratic | Barbara McGowan | 666,612 | 22.21 |
| Democratic | Gloria Alitto Majewski (incumbent) | 663,622 | 22.11 |
| Republican | Jack O'Connor | 356,495 | 11.88 |
| Republican | Rita L. Mullins | 308,632 | 10.28 |
| Republican | James W. "Todd" Miles | 281,112 | 9.37 |
| Total votes | | 3,000,877 | 100 |

=== Unexpired term ===
A special election was held to fill a seat left vacant.

==== Primaries ====
===== Democratic =====
Water Reclamation District Board unexpired term Democratic primary
| Party | Candidate | Votes | % |
|---|---|---|---|
| Democratic | James C. "Jim" Harris | 268,623 | 71.52 |
| Democratic | Janet Tuscher-Campion | 106,965 | 28.48 |
| Total votes | | 375,588 | 100 |

===== Republican =====
Water Reclamation District Board unexpired term Republican primary
| Party | Candidate | Votes | % |
|---|---|---|---|
| Republican | Susan L. Kelsey | 100,201 | 100 |
| Total votes | | 100,201 | 100 |

==== General election ====
Water Reclamation District Board unexpired term election
| Party | Candidate | Votes | % |
|---|---|---|---|
| Democratic | James C. "Jim" Harris | 707,778 | 66.63 |
| Republican | Susan L. Kelsey | 354,523 | 33.37 |
| Total votes | | 1,062,301 | 100 |

== Judicial elections ==
Partisan elections were held for judgeships on the Circuit Court of Cook County, due to vacancies. Other judgeships had retention elections.

Partisan elections were also held for subcircuit courts judgeships due to vacancies. Other judgeships had retention elections.

== Ballot questions ==
One ballot question was included on ballots county-wide during the March primary election.

=== Managed Care Act advisory referendum ===
An advisory referendum was included on the March primary ballots on the Managed Care Act.

Managed Care Act advisory referendum
| Candidate | Votes | % |
|---|---|---|
| Yes | 491,917 | 91.99 |
| No | 42,814 | 8.01 |
| Total votes | 534,731 | 100 |
| Turnout | {{{votes}}} | 19.65% |

== Other elections ==
Coinciding with the primaries, elections were held to elect both the Democratic and Republican committeemen for the suburban townships.

== See also ==
- 1998 Illinois elections
