= Stanley Kusper =

American politician (born 1935)

Stanley T. Kusper Jr.

21st Cook County Clerk
- In office 1973 – December 1990
- Preceded by: Edward J. Barrett
- Succeeded by: David Orr

Personal details
- Born: January 1935 (age 91)
- Party: Democratic
- Education: University of Notre Dame; Northwestern University (J.D.)

Stanley T. Kusper Jr. (born January 1935) is an American politician and lawyer who served as Cook County clerk from 1973 to 1990.

== Early life ==
Kusper was born in January 1935.

He grew up on Chicago's West Side.

Kusper's father was a politically-connected lawyer that served as general counsel to the Polish Roman Catholic Union of America.

After graduating from Weber High School, he attended the University of Notre Dame where he graduated magna cum laude. He then earned his J.D. degree from Northwestern University.

== Career ==
With his father's connections, Kusper as hired as an attorney for the Chicago Board of Election Commissioners, and soon after became the board's chief counsel. Kusper was politically mentored by board chairman Sidney Holzman and Chicago alderman Vito Marzullo. Despite living on the city's northwest side himself, Kusper was an active member of Mazulli's 25th Ward Democratic organization.

After Holzman's death in office, with Marzullo's support, Kusper was appointed chairman of the Chicago Board of Election Commissioners. Richard J. Daley, who liked Kusper, had floated the possibility, during Kusper's chairmanship of the Chicago Board of Election Commissioners, of having Kusper serve as Chicago City Clerk, as Daley wanted to oust John Marcin, but Marzullo stopped this, viewing that as a demotion for Kusper. During his tenure, he was investigated as part of an investigation into the board. In 1972, it was reported that Kusper was considering resigning Chicago Board of Election Commissioners in 1972 to enter private law practice. In 1973, he left the Chicago Board of Election Commissioners, being appointed Cook County clerk.

In the private sector, while serving in public office, Kusper partnered with Andrew Raucci to establish the law practice Kusper & Raucci Chartered.

=== Cook County Clerk ===
In 1973, the Cook County Board of Commissioners appointed Kusper as Cook County clerk. His appointment had been championed by Daley. He was reelected in 1974, 1978, 1982, and 1986.

In the mid-1970s, mayor Daley urged Kusper to move to the city's 12th Ward and become its committeeman, but Kusper opted against doing so due to the objections of his wife.

Kusper formed political alliances with mayors Michael Bilandic and Jane Byrne during their mayoralties, as well as Edward Vrdolyak during Vrdolyak's tenure as chairman of the Cook County Democratic Party. He also had a political rivalry with George Dunne, and twice contemplated challenging him for president of the Cook County Board of Commissioners.

As clerk, he expedited the processing of tax rates for local entities and modernized the suburban Cook County election process.

During his tenure as clerk, he was investigated. He attracted controversy for keeping personal money at banks with which also deposited county money. He also attracted controversy for no-bid contracts. The federal conviction of an aide for a crime that was unrelated to the clerk's office also attracted news coverage.

In 1990 George Dunne announced he would not seek reelection as president of the Cook County Board of Commissioners, Kusper forwent seeking a fifth full term as clerk, and entered the race to succeed Dune in for the office that he had aspired to hold since becoming county clerk. He lost the Democratic primary, finishing last out of four candidates. Originally, Kusper had been the race's frontrunner, but by election day, had been relegated to an also-ran.

=== Later career ===
Kusper has continued to work for his Chicago law practice Kusper & Raucci Chartered. Kusper has served as the attorney for South Suburban College.

== Personal life ==
In November 1958, Kusper married his first wife Evelyn. They had three sons together. They filed for divorce in 1988.

In the early 1990s, Kusper married Lydia Julia Cummings, who became Lydia Julia Kusper.
