= Warwood, West Virginia =

- Neighborhood
- Location within the state of West Virginia
- Coordinates: 40°07′00″N 80°41′59″W
- Country: United States
- State: West Virginia
- County: Ohio
- Established: 1854

Government
- Time zone: UTC-5 (Eastern (EST))
  - Summer (DST): UTC-4 (EDT)
- Area code: 304

Warwood is a neighborhood of the city of Wheeling in Ohio County, West Virginia, United States. It lies at an elevation of 673 feet (205 m). Warwood was named for the Warwood Tool Company. Founded by Henry Warwood of Martins Ferry, Ohio in 1854, the company was sold to Daniel L. Heiskell in 1892 and moved to a location four miles north of Wheeling. The Warwood Tool Company remains in existence to this day.

In the first half of the 20th century, a large number of Greek immigrants predominantly from the island of Karpathos settled in Warwood to work in the coal mines. Among Warwood natives of Karpathian descent is the noted Greek Orthodox theologian John G. Panagiotou. Chicago politician Maria Pappas, also of Greek descent, was born in Warwood.

Glenns Run, a tributary to the Ohio River, joins here.

== See also ==
- List of cities and towns along the Ohio River
