= Edward J. Rosewell =

American politician

Cook County Treasurer
- In office December 1974 – December 1998
- Preceded by: Bernard J. Korzen
- Succeeded by: Maria Pappas

Personal details
- Born: 1924 or 1925
- Died: July 29, 1999 (age 74) Kankakee, Illinois
- Party: Democratic

Edward J. Rosewell was an American politician who served as Cook County treasurer.

== Early life ==
Rosewell was born in 1924 or 1925. He was the youngest son of his parents. His father was a truck driver, and his mom was a homemaker.

Rosewell grew up in the Garfield Park neighborhood on the West Side of Chicago. He went to Our Lady of Sorrows Elementary School and St. Philip High School. He graduated from DePaul University.

== Career ==
Rosewell served two years in the United States Army.

Rosewell began his political career as a young man, working in the 24th Ward of Chicago as a precinct captain.

In the 1950s he became involved in a Young Democrats group, helping found the organization. Other members at the time included Richard Mell, Ted Lechowicz, and Harry Comerford.

Rosewell served as executive director of the Illinois State Toll Highway Authority. He served as a commissioner of the Chicago Park District.

He worked in the private sector as a vice president in the public funds division of Continental Illinois. He worked there until 1974. During his time with the bank, he won election to the Illinois Constitutional Convention as a delegate from the 18th legislative district. At the convention he spoke in favor of allowing the legislature to establish a lottery.

=== Cook County Treasurer ===
In 1974, Richard J. Daley asked Rosewell to run for Cook County treasurer. As the Democratic nominee, he was elected.

He was reelected in 1978, 1982, 1986, 1990, and 1994.

In 1984, he was acquitted of bank fraud by a jury. He had been indicted on June 8, 1983. It had been alleged that he had understated debts from a failed clothing venture of his in order to qualify to receive loans from banks which also held substantial deposits from the county government.

Under indictment, Rosewell opted not to seek reelection in the 1998 election to what would have been a seventh term. In the autumn of 1998, he resigned after pleading guilty to charges of having put two state legislators (Bruce Farley and Miguel Santiago) in ghost jobs in the treasurer's office, which gave thousands of dollars in salary and benefits in exchange for little or no work. During his trial, federal prosecutors argued that Rosewell's office had widespread corruption and nepotism.

== Death ==
Rosewall died at Riverside Medical Center in Kankakee, Illinois on July 29, 1999, from a chronic liver ailment related to hepatitis C. After his death, his former spokesman Tom Leach said that he had suffered this ailment since 1996.

After his death, a federal judge vacated his conviction, saying that Rosewell had been mentally unfit when he signed his plea agreement.

== Personal life ==
Rosewell as a devout catholic, and once met Pope John Paul II. He developed a friendship with Cardinal Joseph Bernardin.

== Works authored ==
Articles

- Rosewell, Edward J. (August 1, 1991). "Rosewell Begs to Differ". Chicago Reader
