= Tom Dart =

American politician

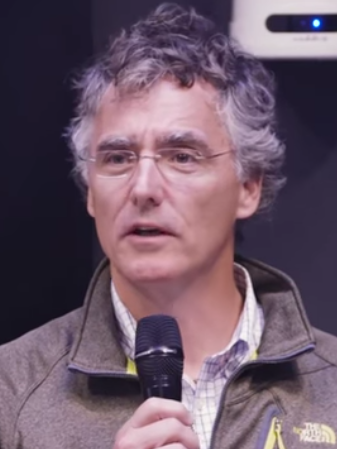
- Dart in 2017

Sheriff of Cook County
- Incumbent
- Assumed office December 1, 2006
- Preceded by: Michael F. Sheahan

Member of the Illinois House of Representatives from the 28th district
- In office January 3, 1993 – January 3, 2003
- Preceded by: Constituency established
- Succeeded by: Robert Rita

Member of the Illinois Senate from the 14th district
- In office January 3, 1991 – January 3, 1993
- Preceded by: Jeremiah E. Joyce
- Succeeded by: Emil Jones Jr. (redistricted)

Personal details
- Born: May 22, 1962 (age 64) Chicago, Illinois, U.S.
- Party: Democratic
- Spouse: Patricia
- Children: 5
- Education: Providence College (BA); Loyola University Chicago (JD)

Thomas J. Dart (born May 22, 1962) is an American attorney, politician, and law enforcement officer serving as the Sheriff of Cook County, Illinois. He previously served as a member of both chambers of the Illinois General Assembly. He has held the office of sheriff since 2006. Due to reforms he implemented, he was name one of Time Magazine's 100 most influential people in 2008.

== Education ==
Dart was born May 22, 1962, in Chicago, Illinois. He graduated from Mount Carmel High School. He earned a Bachelor of Arts degree in history and general social studies from Providence College and a Juris Doctor from Loyola University Chicago.

== Career ==
He served as a staffer to U.S. Senator Claiborne Pell (D-RI) and on the staff of the Illinois Senate's Committee on the Judiciary. He was also an Assistant State's Attorney in Cook County. In 1991, he was appointed to the Illinois Senate to fill the vacancy caused by the resignation of Senator Jeremiah E. Joyce (D-Chicago). In the 1992 Democratic primary, Dart defeated Nelson Rice Sr., a five-term incumbent lawmaker for a seat in the Illinois House of Representatives. He served from January 1993 until January 2003. After his time in the legislature, he became chief of staff to Cook County Sheriff Michael F. Sheahan. In November 2002, Dart was the Democratic nominee for state treasurer of Illinois but lost to incumbent Republican Judy Baar Topinka.

Dart in 2015

When Sheahan announced that he would retire as Cook County Sheriff in 2006, Dart announced his candidacy to succeed Sheahan. Dart won the Democratic primary election on March 21, 2006, defeating Sylvester Baker and Richard Remus by a wide margin, and won the general election in November 2006. On November 2, 2010, Dart faced Republican Frederick Collins in the race for the Cook County Sheriff's office and won handily with 69.37% of the vote. Dart declined to be a candidate in the 2011 Chicago mayoral election. After defeating three Democratic opponents in the 2014 primary election, Dart was unopposed for reelection in the general election of November 2014.

=== Foreclosures ===
In October 2008, Dart made national news when he announced that he was suspending all foreclosure evictions in Cook County. The number of such evictions had increased dramatically since 2006 as a result of the national subprime mortgage crisis. Dart stated that many of the people being evicted were renters who had faithfully paid their rent but had not known that their landlord was in financial trouble. He explained that in many cases, mortgage companies had not fulfilled their obligation to identify tenants in the foreclosed properties, and said, "These mortgage companies only see pieces of paper, not people, and don't care [...] who gets hurt along the way ... We're not going to do their jobs for them anymore. We're just not going to evict innocent tenants. It stops today."

The Illinois Bankers Association was critical of Dart, accusing him of "ignoring his legal responsibilities" and of engaging in "vigilantism". Dart claims he is enforcing an Illinois state law which requires the banks to determine whether the persons resident at an address are actually the persons to whom the foreclosure notice should be served. In 2009, Time named Dart one of its 100 Most Influential People of that year.

=== Craigslist lawsuit ===
In March 2009, Dart filed a lawsuit in federal court against Craigslist, Inc. (09-CV-1385), to close the "erotic services" section of Craigslist. The suit claims that Craigslist is the "largest source of prostitution". The lawsuit was dismissed on October 23, 2009, on the grounds that Craigslist is protected by Section 230 immunity.

== Personal life ==
He and his wife Patricia live in Chicago's Mount Greenwood neighborhood. They have five children.

== Electoral history ==
The following is Dart's electoral history since 1998:

1998 Illinois House of Representatives 28th district Democratic primary
| Party | Candidate | Votes | % |
|---|---|---|---|
| Democratic | Thomas J. Dart (incumbent) | 14,491 | 100.00 |
| Total votes | | 14,491 | 100 |

1998 Illinois House of Representatives 28th district election
| Party | Candidate | Votes | % |
|---|---|---|---|
| Democratic | Thomas J. Dart (incumbent) | 31,873 | 100.00 |
| Total votes | | 31,873 | 100 |

2000 Illinois House of Representatives 28th district Democratic primary
| Party | Candidate | Votes | % |
|---|---|---|---|
| Democratic | Thomas J. Dart (incumbent) | 15,334 | 100.00 |
| Total votes | | 15,334 | 100 |

2000 Illinois House of Representatives 28th district election
| Party | Candidate | Votes | % |
|---|---|---|---|
| Democratic | Thomas J. Dart (incumbent) | 35,117 | 93.17 |
| Republican | David E. Lee | 2,576 | 6.83 |
| Total votes | | 37,693 | 100 |

2002 Illinois State Treasurer Democratic primary
| Party | Candidate | Votes | % |
|---|---|---|---|
| Democratic | Thomas J. Dart | 966,421 | 100 |
| Total votes | | 966,421 | 100 |

2002 Illinois State Treasurer election
| Party | Candidate | Votes | % |
|---|---|---|---|
| Republican | Judy Baar Topinka | 1,896,020 | 54.77 |
| Democratic | Thomas J. Dart | 1,499,055 | 43.30 |
| Libertarian | Rhys Read | 66,593 | 1.92 |
| Total votes | | 3,461,668 | 100 |

2006 Cook County Sheriff Democratic primary
| Party | Candidate | Votes | % |
|---|---|---|---|
| Democratic | Thomas J. Dart | 331,318 | 61.91 |
| Democratic | Sylvester E. Baker, Jr. | 133,944 | 25.03 |
| Democratic | Richard L. Remus | 69,899 | 13.06 |
| Total votes | | 535,161 | 100 |

2006 Cook County Sheriff election
| Party | Candidate | Votes | % |
|---|---|---|---|
| Democratic | Thomas J. Dart | 942,112 | 74.70 |
| Republican | Peter Garza | 319,009 | 25.30 |
| Total votes | | 1,261,121 | 100 |

2010 Cook County Sheriff Democratic primary
| Party | Candidate | Votes | % |
|---|---|---|---|
| Democratic | Thomas J. Dart (incumbent) | 397,844 | 76.37 |
| Democratic | Sylvester E. Baker Jr. | 123,096 | 23.63 |
| Total votes | | 520,940 | 100 |

2010 Cook County Sheriff election
| Party | Candidate | Votes | % |
|---|---|---|---|
| Democratic | Thomas J. Dart (incumbent) | 1,041,696 | 77.26 |
| Republican | Frederick Collins | 257,682 | 19.11 |
| Green | Marshall P. Lewis | 48,930 | 3.63 |
| Total votes | | 1,348,308 | 100 |

2014 Cook County Sheriff Democratic primary
| Party | Candidate | Votes | % |
|---|---|---|---|
| Democratic | Thomas J. Dart (incumbent) | 177,401 | 69.35 |
| Democratic | William "Bill" Evans | 36,740 | 14.36 |
| Democratic | Sylvester E. Baker, Jr. | 26,010 | 10.17 |
| Democratic | Tadeusz "Ted" Palka | 15,661 | 6.12 |
| Total votes | | 255,812 | 100 |

2014 Cook County Sheriff election
| Party | Candidate | Votes | % |
|---|---|---|---|
| Democratic | Thomas J. Dart (incumbent) | 1,055,783 | 100.00 |
| Total votes | | 1,055,783 | 100 |

2018 Cook County Sheriff Democratic primary
| Party | Candidate | Votes | % |
|---|---|---|---|
| Democratic | Thomas J. Dart (incumbent) | 640,512 | 100.00 |
| Total votes | | 640,512 | 100 |

2018 Cook County Sheriff election
| Party | Candidate | Votes | % |
|---|---|---|---|
| Democratic | Thomas J. Dart (incumbent) | 1,455,825 | 100.00 |
| Total votes | | 1,455,825 | 100 |

2022 Cook County Sheriff Democratic primary
| Party | Candidate | Votes | % |
|---|---|---|---|
| Democratic | Thomas Dart (incumbent) | 314,427 | 86.17 |
| Democratic | Noland Rivera | 50,455 | 13.83 |
| Total votes | | 364,882 | 100 |

2022 Cook County Sheriff election
| Party | Candidate | Votes | % |
|---|---|---|---|
| Democratic | Thomas Dart (incumbent) | 1,041,525 | 74.21 |
| Republican | Lupe Aguirre | 321,252 | 22.89 |
| Libertarian | Brad Sandefur | 40,752 | 2.90 |
| Total votes | | 1,403,529 | 100 |

Party political offices
| Preceded by Daniel J. McLaughlin | Democratic nominee for Treasurer of Illinois; 2002 | Succeeded by Alexi Giannoulias |
