= 2014 Cook County, Illinois, elections =

- November 4, 2014
- Turnout: 49.30%

The Cook County, Illinois, general election was held on November 4, 2014.

Primaries were held March 18, 2014.

Elections were held for Assessor, Clerk, Sheriff, Treasurer, President of the Cook County Board of Commissioners, all 17 seats of the Cook County Board of Commissioners, Cook County Board of Review seat 3, three seats on the Water Reclamation District Board, and judgeships on the Circuit Court of Cook County.

== Election information ==
2014 was a midterm election year in the United States. The primaries and general elections for Cook County races coincided with those for federal congressional races and those for state elections.

=== Voter turnout ===
Voter turnout in Cook County during the primaries was 16.26%, with 458,396 ballots cast. Among these, 285,728 Democratic, 169,922 Republican, 245 Green, and 2,501 nonpartisan primary ballots were cast. The city of Chicago saw 16.54% turnout and suburban Cook County saw 15.99% turnout.

The general election saw 49.30% turnout, with 1,364,436 ballots cast. The city of Chicago saw 48.81% turnout and suburban Cook County saw 49.79% turnout.

== Assessor ==
2014 Cook County Assessor election
- November 4, 2014
- Turnout: 34.71%
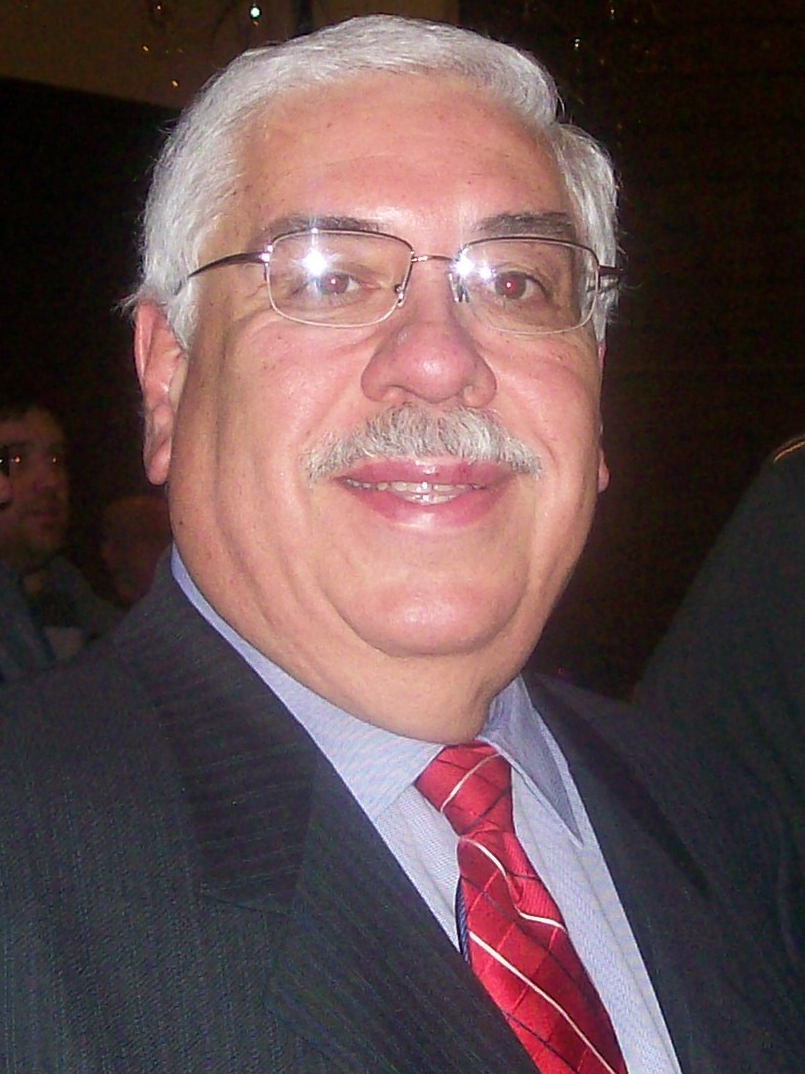
Nominee	Joseph Berrios
Party	Democratic
Popular vote	960,435
Percentage	100%
Assessor before election
Joseph Berrios
Democratic
Elected Assessor
Joseph Berrios
Democratic

In the 2014 Cook County Assessor election, incumbent first-term Assessor Joseph Berrios, a Democrat, was reelected, running unopposed in both the Democratic primary and general election.

=== Primaries ===
==== Democratic ====
Cook County Assessor Democratic primary
Party	Candidate	Votes	%
Democratic	Joseph Berrios (incumbent)	207,460	100
Total votes		207,460	100

==== Republican ====
No candidates, ballot-certified or formal write-in, ran in the Republican primary.

=== General election ===
Cook County Assessor election
Party	Candidate	Votes	%
Democratic	Joseph Berrios	960,435	100
Total votes		960,435	100

== Clerk ==
2014 Cook County Clerk election
- November 4, 2014
- Turnout: 38.36%
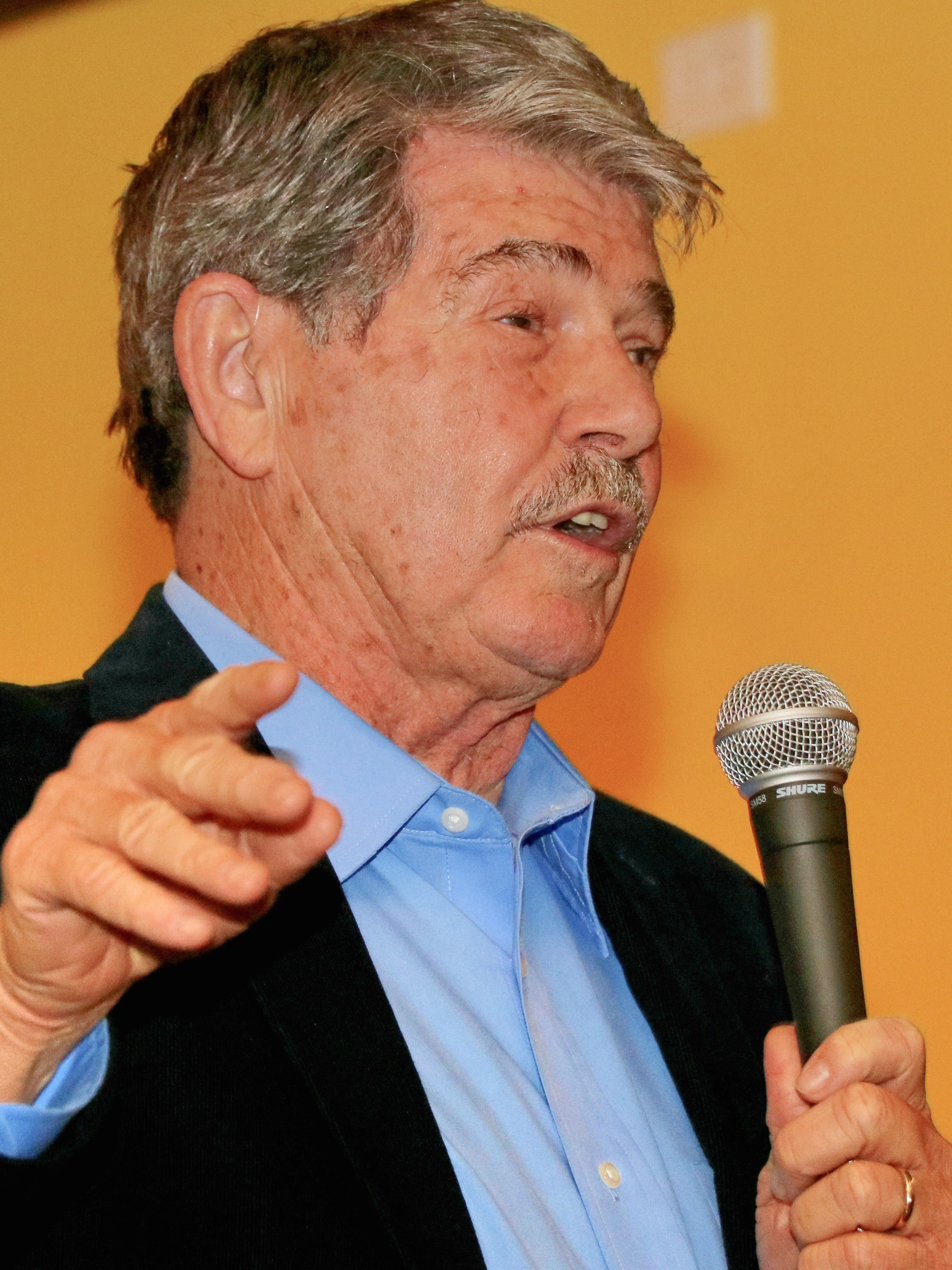
Candidate	David Orr
Party	Democratic
Popular vote	1,061,515
Percentage	100%
Clerk before election
David Orr
Democratic
Elected Clerk
David Orr
Democratic

In the 2014 Cook County Clerk election, incumbent sixth-term Clerk David Orr, a Democrat, was reelected, running unopposed in both the Democratic primary and the general election.

=== Primaries ===
==== Democratic ====
Cook County Clerk Democratic primary
Party	Candidate	Votes	%
Democratic	David D. Orr (incumbent)	241,876	100
Total votes		241,876	100

==== Republican ====
No candidates, ballot-certified or formal write-in, ran in the Republican primary.

=== General election ===
Cook County Clerk election
Party	Candidate	Votes	%
Democratic	David D. Orr (incumbent)	1,061,515	100
Total votes		1,061,515	100

== Sheriff ==
2014 Cook County Sheriff election
- November 4, 2014
- Turnout: 38.15%
Candidate	Tom Dart
Party	Democratic
Popular vote	1,055,783
Percentage	100%
Sheriff before election
Tom Dart
Democratic
Elected Sheriff
Tom Dart
Democratic

In the 2014 Cook County Sheriff election, incumbent second-term Sheriff Tom Dart, a Democrat, was reelected.

=== Primaries ===
==== Democratic ====
Cook County Sheriff Democratic primary
Party	Candidate	Votes	%
Democratic	Thomas J. Dart (incumbent)	177,401	69.35
Democratic	William "Bill" Evans	36,740	14.36
Democratic	Sylvester E. Baker, Jr.	26,010	10.17
Democratic	Tadeusz "Ted" Palka	15,661	6.12
Total votes		255,812	100

==== Republican ====
No candidates, ballot-certified or formal write-in, ran in the Republican primary.

=== General election ===
Cook County Sheriff election
Party	Candidate	Votes	%
Democratic	Thomas J. Dart (incumbent)	1,055,783	100
Total votes		1,055,783	100

== Treasurer ==
2014 Cook County Treasurer election
- November 4, 2014
- Turnout: 37.88%
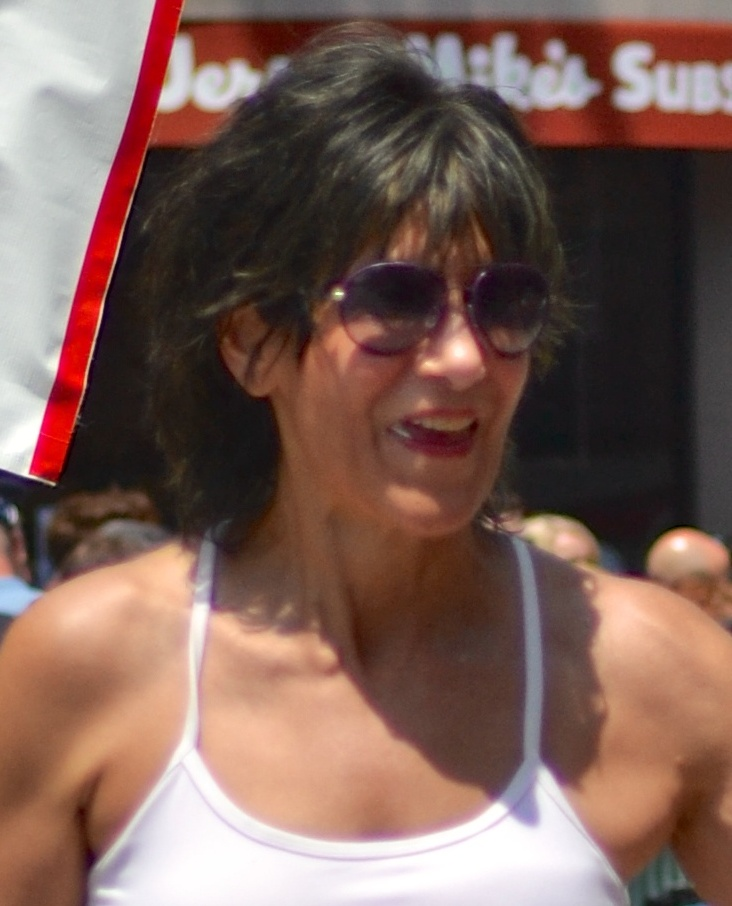
Candidate	Maria Pappas
Party	Democratic
Popular vote	1,048,234
Percentage	100%
Treasurer before election
Maria Pappas
Democratic
Elected Treasurer
Maria Pappas
Democratic

In the 2014 Cook County Treasurer election, incumbent fourth-term Treasurer Maria Pappas, a Democrat, was reelected, running unopposed in both the Democratic primary and general election.

=== Primaries ===
==== Democratic ====
Cook County Treasurer Democratic primary
Party	Candidate	Votes	%
Democratic	Maria Pappas (incumbent)	242,603	100
Total votes		242,603	100

==== Republican ====
No candidates, ballot-certified or formal write-in, ran in the Republican primary.

=== General election ===
Cook County Treasurer election
Party	Candidate	Votes	%
Democratic	Maria Pappas (incumbent)	1,048,234	100
Total votes		1,048,234	100

== President of the Cook County Board of Commissioners ==
2014 President of the Cook County Board of Commissioners election
- November 4, 2014
- Turnout: 38.77%
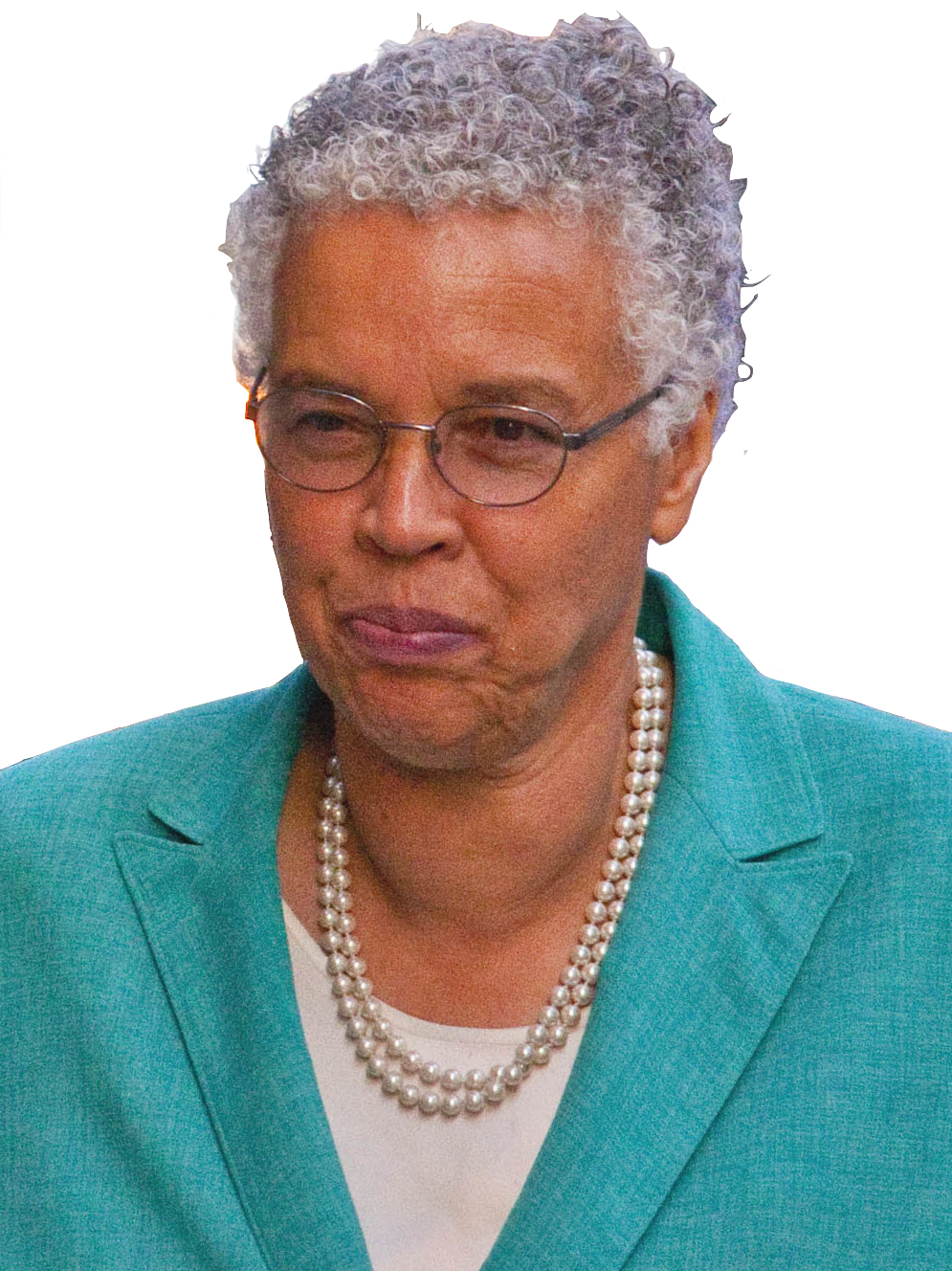
Nominee	Toni Preckwinkle
Party	Democratic
Popular vote	1,072,886
Percentage	100%
President before election
Toni Preckwinkle
Democratic
Elected President
Toni Preckwinkle
Democratic

In the 2014 President of the Cook County Board of Commissioners election, incumbent first-term President Toni Preckwinkle, a Democrat, was reelected.

=== Primaries ===
==== Democratic ====
President of the Cook County Board of Commissioners Democratic primary
Party	Candidate	Votes	%
Democratic	Toni Preckwinkle (incumbent)	240,831	100
Total votes		240,831	100

==== Republican ====
No candidates, ballot-certified or formal write-in, ran in the Republican primary.

=== General election ===
President of the Cook County Board of Commissioners election
Party	Candidate	Votes	%
Democratic	Toni Preckwinkle (incumbent)	1,072,886	100
Total votes		1,072,886	100

== Cook County Board of Commissioners ==
2014 Cook County Board of Commissioners election
- November 4, 2014

All 17 seats on the Cook County Board of Commissioners 9 seats needed for a majority
	First party	Second party
Party	Democratic	Republican
Seats before	13	4
Seats won	13	4
Seat change	Steady	Steady
Popular vote	809,692	239,746
Percentage	77.12%	22.84%
Swing	▲9.82%	▼4.58%

The 2014 Cook County Board of Commissioners election saw all seventeen seats of the Cook County Board of Commissioners up for election to four-year terms.

Fifteen members were reelected. One member did not seek reelection. One member was defeated in their party's primary. This meant that a total of two individuals were newly-elected.

As these were the first elections held following the 2010 United States census, the seats faced redistricting before this election.

== Cook County Board of Review ==
2014 Cook County Board of Review election
- November 4, 2014

1 of 3 seats on the Cook County Board of Review 2 seats needed for a majority
	First party	Second party
Party	Democratic	Republican
Seats before	2	1
Seats after	2	1
Seat change	Steady	Steady
Seats up	1	0
Races won	1	0

In the 2014 Cook County Board of Review election, one seat, Democratic-held, out of its three seats was up for election. Incumbent Larry Rogers, Jr. was reelected.

The Cook County Board of Review has its three seats rotate the length of terms. In a staggered fashion (in which no two seats have coinciding two-year terms), the seats rotate between two consecutive four-year terms and a two-year term.

=== 3rd district ===
Incumbent third-term member Larry Rogers, Jr., a Democrat last reelected in 2012, was reelected, running unopposed in both the Democratic primary and general election. This election was to a four-year term.

==== Primaries ====
===== Democratic =====
Cook County Board of Review 3rd district Democratic primary
Party	Candidate	Votes	%
Democratic	Larry Rogers, Jr. (incumbent)	109,750	100
Total votes		109,750	100

===== Republican =====
No candidates, ballot-certified or formal write-in, ran in the Republican primary.

==== General election ====
Cook County Board of Review 3rd district election
Party	Candidate	Votes	%
Democratic	Larry Rogers, Jr. (incumbent)	386,382	100
Total votes		386,382	100

== Water Reclamation District Board ==
2014 Metropolitan Water Reclamation District of Greater Chicago election
- November 4, 2014

3 of 9 seats on the Metropolitan Water Reclamation District of Greater Chicago 5 seats needed for a majority
	First party	Second party	Third party
Party	Democratic	Republican	Green
Seats before	9	0	0
Seats after	9	0	0
Seat change	Steady	Steady	Steady
Popular vote	1,902,763	824,135	350,058
Percentage	61.84%	26.78%	11.38%
Swing	▼18.07%	▲10.71%	▼1.1%
Seats up	3	0	0
Races won	3	0	0

In the 2014 Metropolitan Water Reclamation District of Greater Chicago election, three of the nine seats on the Metropolitan Water Reclamation District of Greater Chicago board were up for election in an at-large race. Since three six-year seats were up for election, voters could vote for up to three candidates and the top-three finishers would win.

Two of the incumbents for the three seats were seeking reelection, Cynthia M. Santos and Frank Avila both Democrats. Each won reelection. Joining them in winning the general election was fellow Democrat Tim Bradford.

=== Primaries ===
==== Democratic ====
Water Reclamation District Board election Democratic primary
Party	Candidate	Votes	%
Democratic	Cynthia M. Santos (incumbent)	117,240	18.16
Democratic	Frank Avila (incumbent)	116,164	17.99
Democratic	Timothy "Tim" Bradford	112,152	17.37
Democratic	Josina Morita	89,086	13.80
Democratic	Kathleen Mary O'Reilley	67,071	10.39
Democratic	Frank Edward Gardner	42,336	6.56
Democratic	Tom Courtney	37,468	5.80
Democratic	Brendan Francis Houlihan	33,821	5.24
Democratic	Adam Miguest	16,185	2.51
Democratic	John S. Xydakis	11,925	1.85
Write-in	Others	2,266	0.35
Total votes		645,714	100

==== Republican ====
Water Reclamation District Board election Republican primary
Party	Candidate	Votes	%
Republican	James "Jim" Parrilli	87,164	33.81
Republican	Herb Schumann	85,504	33.16
Republican	R. Cary Capparelli	85,161	33.03
Total votes		257,829	100

=== General election ===
Water Reclamation District Board election
Party	Candidate	Votes	%
Democratic	Cynthia M. Santos (incumbent)	691,880	22.49
Democratic	Frank Avila (incumbent)	617,361	20.06
Democratic	Timothy "Tim" Bradford	593,522	19.29
Republican	James "Jim" Parrill	290,138	9.43
Republican	Herb Schumann	279,855	9.10
Republican	R. Cary Capparelli	254,142	8.26
Green	Karen Roothaan	130,319	4.24
Green	George Milkowski	108,888	3.54
Green	Michael Smith	110,851	3.60
Total votes		3,076,956	100

== Judicial elections ==
11 judgeships on the Circuit Court of Cook County were up for partisan elections due to vacancies. 72 circuit court judges had retention elections.

15 subcircuit courts judgeships were also up for partisan elections due to vacancies. Multiple subcircuit judges had retention elections.

== Other elections ==
Coinciding with the primaries, elections were held to elect both the Democratic and Republican committeemen for the suburban townships.

== See also ==
- 2014 Illinois elections
