= Maria Pappas =

American politician

- Pappas in 2026

Treasurer of Cook County
- Incumbent
- Assumed office December 1998
- Preceded by: Edward J. Rosewell

Member of the Cook County Board of Commissioners
- In office December 1990 – December 1998
- Succeeded by: Mike Quigley
- Constituency: Chicago at-large district (1990–1994); 10th district (1994–1998)

Personal details
- Born: June 7, 1949 (age 77) Warwood, West Virginia, U.S.
- Party: Democratic
- Spouse: Peter Kamberos (m. 1991)
- Education: West Liberty University (BA); West Virginia University (MA); Loyola University Chicago (PhD); Illinois Institute of Technology (JD)

Maria Pappas (born June 7, 1949) is an American attorney and politician who has served as the treasurer of Cook County, Illinois since 1998. Prior to that, she served two terms on the Cook County Board of Commissioners; first as one of ten members elected from Chicago and then, after the board moved to single-member constituencies, as the member from the 10th district. She is currently running for mayor of Chicago in the 2027 election.

== Early life ==
Pappas was born June 7, 1949, in Warwood, a neighborhood of Wheeling, West Virginia, to first generation Greek American parents. She earned a bachelor's degree in sociology from West Liberty State College and a master's degree in counseling at West Virginia University. She then relocated to Chicago to work at the Adler Institute with Rudolf Dreikurs. She earned her Ph.D. from Loyola University Chicago in 1976. While a doctoral student, she received a state grant to work with mothers at Altgeld Garden Homes. She then taught at Governors State University until switching to the legal field; graduating from Chicago Kent College of Law at the Illinois Institute of Technology in 1982.

== Political career ==
Pappas chose to run for one of ten positions elected at large from the City of Chicago. She received the first spot on the ballot and won. While a member of the Cook County Board, she had a political rivalry with then Board President Richard Phelan. She ran for the Democratic nomination to succeed Phelan as Board President in 1994. She lost to fellow board member John Stroger in a three-way race that also included County Clerk Aurelia Pucinski.

In 1998, she was elected Cook County Treasurer. In her first year, she tripled the amount of interest earned by the Treasurer's office and uncovered a scam run by her predecessor Edward J. Rosewell. Rosewell resigned as Treasurer after being convicted for his role in a ghost payroll scheme. She has been re-elected six times: 2002, 2006, 2010, 2014, 2018 and 2022. As Treasurer, she was the chief proponent of the Cook County Debt Disclosure Ordinance, passed in 2009, which requires taxing districts to publicly report their finances, including pension debt.

She ran for United States Senate in 2004, losing the Democratic nomination to Barack Obama. She explored a run for Mayor of Chicago in 2011, but chose not to run.

After Rahm Emanuel announced he would not seek reelection, Pappas considered running for Mayor of Chicago in 2019, but ultimately did not run.

=== 2027 Chicago mayoral campaign ===
In November 2025, Pappas announced her intent to run for mayor of Chicago, challenging incumbent Mayor Brandon Johnson. On October 26, 2026, Pappas submitted "shy of 40,000 signatures" to appear on the February 2027 ballot. She will formally announce her candidacy after the November 2026 elections, in which she is running for re-election as country treasurer.

== Radio career ==
Since 2020, Pappas has hosted a live radio program on WVON, Black Houses Matter, to encourage taxpayers to claim overpaid property taxes. In 2023 it was expanded to WRLL.
