= Harry H. Semrow =

American politician and baseball team owner

Member of the Cook County Board of Appeals
- In office December 1970 – November 23, 1987
- Succeeded by: Thomas A. Jaconetty

Member of the Cook County Board of Commissioners from Chicago
- In office December 1966 – 1970

Postmaster of Chicago
- In office November 2, 1961 – 1966 (acting postmaster from November November 2, 1961–October 5, 1962)
- Appointed by: John F. Kennedy
- Preceded by: Carl A. Shroeder
- Succeeded by: William Bochelli

Member of the Illinois House of Representatives from the 14th district
- In office 1957–1961

Personal details
- Born: Chicago, Illinois
- Died: November 23, 1987 (age 72) Chicago, Illinois
- Party: Democratic
- Education: American Conservatory of Music
- Profession: Politician, businessman, baseball team owner

Harry H. Semrow (August 19, 1915 – November 23, 1987) was an American politician, businessman, baseball team owner.

From 1957 until 1961, Semrow served in the Illinois House of Representatives as a Democrat. In 1961, President John F. Kennedy appointed Semrow postmaster of Chicago and he served until 1966. From 1966 to 1970, Semrow served on the Cook County Board of Commissioners. From 1970 until his death, Semrow served on the Cook County Board of Appeals. Semrow also owned the radio station AM 1590 WNMP and the Quad Cities Angels baseball team.

== Early life ==
Semrow was born in Chicago, Illinois, Semrow served in the United States Navy during World War II and studied at the American Conservatory of Music.

== Private sector career ==
Semrow owned the radio station AM 1590 WNMP in Evanston, Illinois through his company Semrow Broadcasting.

In 1986, he became the owner of the Quad Cities Angels baseball team in Davenport, Iowa. He was considered to be a well-known political figure in Chicago.

== Political and government career ==
A member of the Democratic Party, Semrow held several elected positions and also served in the appointed position of postmaster of Chicago.

=== Illinois state representative ===
From 1957 until 1961, Sermon served as a Democratic member of the Illinois House of Representatives, representing the 14th district. He was first elected in 1956.

In his first term, he was a prominent advocate for a bill to require resuscitators in all hospitals, which passed in the state house by a unanimous 115–0 vote. In the state house, Semrow attempted to pass a ban on sparklers, bringing an 11-year-old girl that had been blinded by a sparkler to the floor of the state house in order to advocate for a ban. He also established himself as an advocate on behalf of the disabled and mentally ill.

=== Postmaster of Chicago ===
In order to assume the office, Semrow resigned from Illinois House of Representatives, as well as his private sector positions as president of Sermon Products and Sermon Broadcasting Company.

Semrow was nominated in October 1961 to serve as the acting postmaster of Chicago, which would have him oversee what was, at the time, the second-largest post office in the United States. He was sworn in and took office on November 2, 1961. In his first year, Semrow reported reducing expenses for the post office by roughly $3 million while seeing a 4.7% increase in male handled. As acting postmaster, Semrow also created a post office musical band, employee welfare committee, as well as employee baseball, baseball, bowling, and basketball teams. He also created a bonding policy that allowed businesses to purchase postage stamps utilizing standard bank checks if they first posted an indemnity bond.

Semrow was nominated by President John F. Kennedy to serve as the permanent postmaster of Chicago. He was confirmed by the United States Senate on October 5, 1962. Semrow held the position until he resigned in 1966.

=== Cook County Board of Commissioners ===
In 1966, Semrow was elected to the Cook County Board of Commissioners, the legislature of the Cook County government. However, he was defeated by Republican Richard B. Ogilvie in the coinciding election for president of the Cook County Board of Commissioners, in which he was also a candidate.

=== Cook County Board of Appeals ===
In 1970, Semrow resigned from the Cook County Board of Commissioners and ran for the Cook County Board of Appeals, the county's tax appeals board. He won election, and served until his death, being reelected in 1974, 1978, 1982, and 1986.

== Death ==
Semrow died at the age of 72 on November 23, 1987, at his personal residence in the Edgebrook neighborhood of Chicago.
