= Cook County Treasurer =

County treasurer of Cook County, Illinois

- Incumbent; Maria Pappas since December 1998
- Term length: 4 years
- Inaugural holder: Archibald Clybourn
- Formation: 1831

The Cook County treasurer is the treasurer of county government in Cook County, Illinois.

== Office description ==
The Cook County treasurer oversees the second-largest system of property tax collection and distribution in the United States. The inaugural holder of the office of treasurer was Archibald Clybourn, an early settler of Cook County. The office was established in 1831, and since 1835 has been an elected, partisan position. Its elected terms were initially two years in length- Prior to 1835, it was appointed by the three-member Cook County Board of Commissioners. Today the terms are four years.

The treasurer holds responsibility for printing and mailing bills based on data they are provided by other county and state agencies regarding assessments, exemptions, and tax rate. The treasurer is responsible for the collection of $12 billion in taxes annually from owners of over 1.8 million parcels of property. The treasurer is responsible for the distribution of tax funds to approximately 2,200 local government agencies with the jurisdiction to collect taxes, including school districts, municipalities, townships, park systems, forest preserve systems, libraries, public health and safety agencies, election authorities, economic-development agencies, and public-works bonds. The treasurer needs to maintain an investment policy and strategy. The treasurer is tasked with receiving and safely keeping revenues and other public funds of the county, and all other money authorized by the law to be paid to them, and to disburse these funds in accordance to the law.

Under state law, to assist them with the execution of their duties, the treasurer appoints deputies, assistants, and personnel. The treasurer must file regular reports with the president of the Cook County Board of Commissioners providing summary of the financial status of their office. The treasurer also, per state law, oversees the process of refunding overpayment of taxes.

As of 2022, the salary paid to the elected Cook County treasurer is $115,500. As of October 2021, the Cook County treasurer's office has 58 employees and a total annual budget of $12,703,015.

== Officeholders ==
Treasurer	Term in office	Party	Notes	Cite
Archibald Clybourn	March 1831–March 1834			
Isaac Harmon	March 1834–March 1835			
Henry Kimball	March 1835–March 1836		The first elected Treasurer	
Samuel J. Trowbridge	March 1836–June 1837			
Edward E. Hunter	June 1837–May 1838			
John Calhoun	May 1838–June 1839			
Nathan H. Bolles	June 1839–October 1839			
Isaac Cook	October 1839–August 1843			
Anton Getzler	August 1843–August 1847			
William L. Church	August 1847–November 1849			
James Long	November 1849–November 1851			
Horatio N. Heald	1851–1855			
Michael Gleason	1855–1857			
Augustus H. Boyden	1857–1861			
Jacob Rehm	1861–1865			
Jesse M. Allen	1865–1867			
Thomas O. Osborn	November 1867–1869			
H.S. Rexford	1869–1871			
Julian Sidney Rumsey	1871–1873	Republican		
Henry B. Miller	1873–1875			
Louis C. Huck	1875–1877			
S.H. McCrea	1877–1879			
William T. Johnson	1879–1882			
William C. Seipp	1882–1886	Democratic		
John R. Thompson	____–1910	Republican		
W. L. O'Connell	1910–____	Democratic		
H. R. Gibbons	December 1918–April 19, 1921	Democratic	Elected in 1918; died in office	
Patrick J. Carr	April 20, 1921–____		Appointed by Cook County Board of Commissioners on April 20, 1921	
George F. Harding Jr.	1926–30			
Joseph McDonough	1930–1934		Elected in 1930; died in office	
Robert Sweitzer	December 4, 1934–1935	Democratic	Elected in 1934, removed from office by vote of the Cook County Board of Commissioners in 1935	
Joseph L. Gill	1935–1936	Democratic	Appointed in 1935	
Louis E. Nelson	1946-1950	Republican		
Herbert C. Paschen	1954–1958	Democratic		
Francis S. Lorenz	1958–September 1961	Democratic	Elected in 1958; resigned to accept appointment as Illinois Treasurer	
Bernard J. Korzen				
Edward J. Rosewell	December 1974–December 1998	Democratic	Elected in 1974, 1988, 1982, 1986, 1990, 1994	
Maria Pappas	December 1998–present	Democratic	Elected in 1998, 2002, 2006, 2019, 2014, 2018, 2022	

== Recent election results ==
Cook County Treasurer general elections
Year	Winning candidate	Party	Vote (pct)	Opponent	Party	Vote (pct)	Opponent	Party	Vote (pct)	Opponent	Party	Vote (pct)
1986	Edward J. Rosewell	Democratic	905,190 (68.78%)	Richard M. Hetzer	Republican	410,909 (31.22%)						
1990	Edward J. Roswell	Democratic	710,699 (58.03%)	Thomas D. Eilers	Republican	357,673 (29.21%)	Charles W. Alexander	Harold Washington Party	156,294 (12.76%)			
1994	Edward J. Roswell	Democratic		Jean Reyes Pechette	Republican		Robert J. Pettis	Harold Washington Party		John Justice	Populist	
1998	Maria Pappas	Democratic	978,373 (77.79%)	Anthony Peraica	Republican	279,355 (22.21%)						
2002	Maria Pappas	Democratic	998,480 (76.20%)	Richard J. Daniels	Republican	311,787 (23.80%)						
2006	Maria Pappas	Democratic	1,074,756 (83.70%)	Erik Peck	Republican	209,253 (16.30%)						
2010	Maria Pappas	Democratic	1,042,318 (77.21%)	Carol A. Morse	Republican	307,612 (22.79%)						
2014	Maria Pappas	Democratic	1,048,234 (100%)									
2018	Maria Pappas	Democratic	1,447,145 (99.26%)	Others	Write-ins	10,780 (0.74%)						
2022	Maria Pappas	Democratic	1,063,160 (75.41%)	Peter Kopsaftis	Republican	314,013 (22.28%)	Michael Murphy	Libertarian	32,577 (2.31%)			
