= Regional office of education =

Type of educational government agency in Illinois

A regional office of education (ROE), sometimes called a regional superintendent's office, is a level of educational administration in Illinois. Each one has an educational service region, or simply region, consisting of one or more counties, and supervisory jurisdiction over the school districts lying primarily in that county or those counties. The office is primarily under the control of a publicly-elected "regional superintendent of schools", formerly known as the "county superintendent of schools", but also has a publicly-elected "regional board of school trustees", formerly known as a "county board of school trustees".

== Regional superintendent ==
The regional superintendent is an elected office, different than the appointed superintendents of school districts that operate the public schools. The regional superintendent has many duties related to school issues that cross school district lines.

Recognition of school districts
The regional superintendent assigns the school district numbers in the region, keeps the map of school districts, and determines what school district boundaries were intended when the boundaries were established.

General oversight and counsel to school districts
The regional superintendent generally "shall exercise supervision and control over all school districts within the county". This includes the general power to issue directions about the "in the science, art and methods of teaching, and in regard to courses of study" and a mandate to "labor in every practicable way to elevate the standard of teaching and improve the condition of the common schools". The regional superintendent acts as the "official adviser and assistant of the school officers and teachers" in the region, giving advice according to the Illinois State Board of Education, and the first source of opinion and advice on "all controversies arising under the school law"; afterwards an appeal may be made to the State Board of Education. Regional superintendents also help school districts with grant writing.

School inspections
The regional superintendent is responsible for determining whether a school district is maintaining a proper schoolhouse according to state law.

Making qualified teachers available
The regional superintendent holds teacher "institute" days for professional education and workshops, and uses teachers' license registration fees, including a portion of renewal and duplicate fees, to fund the institutes. The regional superintendent also keeps a list of teacher vacancies in the school districts in the region.

Truancy
The regional superintendent appoints the county truant officer to perform the truant officer duties in all school districts that do not hire their own truant officers.

Oversight of school funds
In places where township school trustees still operate or where school district treasurers exist, the regional superintendent examines the records to insure that they are in order; in other places, the regional superintendent sells and certifies the "township fund lands" that are no longer under the township-level control.

Enforcement
In cases of misbehavior, the regional superintendent has certain powers to restore the school system to proper operation, even when the school district won't. For example, the regional superintendent can remove a school board member who refuses to perform official duties, and can recommend that the State Board of Education withhold funds from teachers, school officials, or trustees until they provide all the reports required by law and properly account for school funds.

== History ==
The early forerunner of the regional superintendent was each county's Commissioner of School Lands in each county, created by state law in 1829, but appointed by the county board and having no responsibility for school operations. The administrative responsibilities began in the 1840s when that the county commissioner became an elected office and was also designated as ex-officio superintendent of schools. By 1865 it became an elected office. Among the duties of the office was to examine and grant teaching certificates to people found competent to teach. In 1865, the elected office of County Superintendent of Schools was established with a tenure of 4 years, a per diem, and a requirement to visit each school in the county at least once per year.

In 1917, Illinois established a non-high school district in each county with territory unserved by a high school, and the county superintendent was made ex-officio board member of that district. In 1953, the county superintendents were required to dissolve any remaining non-high school districts and give the territory to one or more adjacent high school districts. However, Chester Non-High School District 122 survived; the superintendent still remains a non-voting member of the board.

In 1973, the county superintendents' offices of many small counties were consolidated into multi-county regions, resulting in a drop from 102 to 78 county superintendents. The title of the office was changed to "regional superintendent of schools" in 1975.

This was followed by another consolidation in 1977, to 57 regions, each with a population of at least 33,000.

The state mandated a consolidation of regions again in 1995, to 45, each with a population of 43,000.

In 2013, the Illinois legislature required the number of regions to be reduced to 35, and began requiring each region to have a population of at least 61,000 from July 2015 on. Sixteen regions were eliminated by consolidation into other regions between 2013 and 2015.

=== Cook County ===
The office of regional superintendent was eliminated for Cook County from July 1994 to August 1995, but restored.

In 2010, Regional Office of Education 14, which covered Cook County outside of Chicago, was dissolved and replaced with intermediate service centers called North Cook ISC 1, West Cook ISC 2, and South Cook ISC 4.
