= Thomas Hynes =

Thomas Hynes may refer to:

- Thomas Hynes (politician) (1938–2019), American politician in Illinois
- Thomas Hynes (fisherman) (c. 1831–1908), Newfoundland fisherman, protester and fugitive
- Thomas Hynes (Cross of Valour recipient) (died 1977)
- Tom Hynes (born 1943), Australian rules footballer

== See also ==
- Thomas Hynes House, in Aspen, Colorado, United States
