= Midterm election =

Type of election

Apart from general elections and by-elections, a midterm election refers to a type of election where the people can elect their representatives and other subnational officeholders (e.g. governor, members of local council) in the middle of the term of the executive. This is usually used to describe elections to a governmental body (generally a legislature) that are staggered so that the total number of offices of that body would not be up for election at the same time. Only a fraction of a body seats are up for election while others are not until the terms of the next set of members are to expire. The legislators may have the same or longer fixed term of office as the executive, which facilitates an election midterm of the tenure of the higher office.

In the United States, the president and vice president are elected every four years in indirect (electoral college) presidential elections. The legislative bodies of the United States are the Senate (which serves six-year terms) and House of Representatives (two year-terms). The Senate has one third of its members up for election every two years while the House has all its membership up for election every two years. Regarding elections to the United States Congress, the point of reference is the president's term. There are three classes of United States senators; each election replaces one class, hence a "midterm election" appears as one third through the term of one class and two thirds through the other, while still midway the term of a president. In addition to federal legislative bodies, governors of 36 states and three territories are also up for election during a midterm election.

Meanwhile, although the Philippines and Liberia also conduct midterm elections, not all seats in the legislative bodies with elections are contested in a single cycle. This means the winners of such elections take office in their respective legislative bodies that conduct such elections midway through the term of half of the other members, hence for the members who were not up for election, the incoming members take office midway through their terms. This is especially the case in the Philippine Senate, when there are elections every three years to fill half of the 24 seats for a six-year term.

While the House of Councillors of Japan uses a staggered election, there are no fixed terms to compare with as the House of Representatives has a variable term, and the position of the emperor is hereditary. Despite the fact that the Prime Minister of Japan is elected by the House of Representatives, the Prime Minister usually would take the responsibilities following the House of Councillors election results, include resignation or cabinet reshuffle.

Conversely, in Cyprus, while the House of Representatives is elected for a fixed term of five years, and renewed entirely in each election, House elections are scheduled to be held in the middle of the President's own five-year term.

The results of such a midterm election serve as a measuring stick to the popularity of the incumbent executive, although in the United States the governing party has suffered election defeats for most of the time. In European countries where parliamentary systems of government are prevalent, midterms do not always exist in the strictest sense. In such a case, although local, regional, and European Parliamentary elections are often considered a proxy measuring stick for how popular the governing party is outside of a national parliamentary election year, they are not necessarily held at the exact midpoint between scheduled national parliamentary or presidential elections.

== General elections ==
=== Presidential and semi-presidential systems ===
- Argentina (legislative and local election)
- Brazil (local elections)
- Liberia
- Mexico (legislative and local election)
- Philippines (legislative and local election)
- Taiwan (local election)
- United States (legislative and local election) - See: United States midterm election (legislative and local election)
- Venezuela (legislative election)

=== Parliamentary systems ===
- Canada (Provincial and local elections)
- India
- Nepal
- Pakistan
- South Africa (public elections)
