= Robert Shaw (Illinois politician) =

American politician (1937–2021)

Commissioner of Cook County Board of Review from the 3rd district
- In office December 1998 – December 2004
- Preceded by: Seat established
- Succeeded by: Larry Rogers Jr.

Chicago Alderman from the 9th ward
- In office May 1987 – December 1998
- Preceded by: Perry H. Hutchinson
- Succeeded by: Melvin Powell Sr.
- In office May 1979 – May 1983
- Preceded by: Alexander A. Adduci
- Succeeded by: Perry H. Hutchinson

Personal details
- Born: July 31, 1937 Fulton, Arkansas, U.S.
- Died: July 22, 2021 (aged 83) South Holland, Illinois, U.S.
- Party: Democratic
- Relatives: William Shaw (twin brother)

Robert Shaw (July 31, 1937 – July 22, 2021) was an American politician. He served as a City of Chicago Alderman in the 9th ward for four terms, first in 1979 through 1983 and again from 1987 until 1998. Shaw also served as commissioner on the Cook County Board of Review from 1998 until 2004.

For more than a quarter century, Shaw and his identical twin brother William were dominant political "kingmakers" of Chicago's far South Side and southern suburbs. However, their influence dissipated greatly in the late 1990s and the early 2000s, with Jesse Jackson Jr. largely beating them out to become the new kingmaker in what had been their territory. Both Shaw and his twin brother were controversial figures. After losing reelection to the Cook County Board of Review in 2004, Shaw became a perennial candidate.

== Early life and education ==
Shaw and his identical twin brother, William, were born on July 31, 1937, in Fulton, Arkansas. His parents were sharecroppers. Shaw is black. He grew up for a number of his early years in nearby Hope, Arkansas. In Hope, he was neighbours with future U.S. president Bill Clinton. He and his family next moved to St. Louis, Missouri. In 1952, Shaw's family relocated to Chicago, Illinois, settling on the city's West Side.

Shaw studied liberal arts at Kennedy–King College.

== Early political career ==
Shaw and his brother learned politics from working in the 24th Ward Regular Democratic organization run by Arthur X. Elrod on the city's west side. He got his start at seventeen by working for an assistant precinct captain in the 24th ward. He later worked as a precinct captain for Benjamin F. Lewis, prior to Lewis' 1963 murder. He worked on Lewis' successful campaign for the Chicago City Council.

Shaw and his twin brother became involved in the African American civil rights movement. In 1969, Shaw moved to the South Side of Chicago, settling in the Roseland neighborhood. The Shaw brothers both moved to the far South Side of the city, believing it to be the best location to establish an African American-led Democratic Party organization. In the late-1970s, he moved to the city's 9th ward, on the South Side. From 1975 through 1978, Shaw was employed as an affirmative action and workers compensation executive at the Illinois Department of Labor.

== Chicago City Council ==
Shaw served two tenures as the alderman from Chicago's ninth ward. In 1975, Shaw ran his first campaign for the Chicago City Council, unsuccessfully challenging incumbent 9th ward alderman Alexander Adduci.

=== First tenure (1979–1983) ===
Shaw was elected to the Chicago City Council in 1979, this time defeating Adducci. Shaw used racially charged rhetoric during the campaign. Adducci filed a lawsuit accusing supporters of Shaw's campaign of forging a letter that made Adducci (who was white) appear racist. In 1979, the Illinois Board of Elections investigated allegations that Shaw had violated the state's Campaign Disclosure Act during his aldermanic campaign.

Shaw rose to prominence as a main African American community ally of Mayor Jane Byrne. He received criticism from Black independents when he voted in favor of Byrne's redistricting map for the city's wards, which a federal court would subsequently rule as being unfair to African Americans and Latinos. When Black protesters showed up at the City Council chamber to protest Byrne's firing of Black members of the Chicago Board of Education and the Chicago Housing Authority Board, Shaw called for the removal of the protesters and stood in support of Byrne and Chicago Housing Authority chairman Charles Swibel. A January 1981 article by F. Richard Ciccone of the Chicago Tribune described Shaw as "no stranger to city council controversy, though only a freshman alderman".

In 1981, Shaw introduced legislation that would have stripped the city's personnel code by drastically increasing the number of patronage hires, taking 15,000 civil service jobs away from having job security and merit-based testing as a hiring practice. He partnered with Edward Vrdolyak on this legislation. He would tell the media, "I asked my friends, Ed Vrdolyak and Fred Roti to help me out, and they did". Shaw also credited City Council floor leader Wilson Frost with assisting in redrafting the proposal on the City Council floor. The legislation was overwhelmingly approved in a city council vote. Shaw and Wilson Frost both argued that eliminating the personnel code, and its testing requirements, would be beneficial to Black job applicants. The legislation was ultimately vetoed by mayor Byrne, after facing strong opposition from Chicagoans (a Chicago Tribune poll found 76% of Chicagoans opposed removing the personnel code).

In its obituary for Shaw, the Chicago Crusader credited him with supporting hundreds of ordinances in his two stints as an alderman that had the impact of providing more opportunities for black-owned businesses to do business with the city government.

In 1981, Shaw introduced legislation that would require gas stations to have public restrooms. This was quickly shot down by the City Council. In 1982, Shaw voted against the handgun ban ordinance championed by mayor Byrne. The legislation passed without his support. In 1982, Shaw also introduced an ordinance that would have increased the salary of aldermen from $27,600 to $46,350. After this, Mayor Byrne publicly declared she would veto any pay raise for Chicago aldermen.

Shaw lost reelection to Perry H. Hutchison in 1983. Shaw's loss was attributed to his choice to endorse incumbent mayor Byrne over Harold Washington in the Democratic primary for the coinciding mayoral election. Washington won 80% of the vote in the 9th ward during the Democratic mayoral primary. Shaw was seen as having been disloyal to the black community for supporting Byrne over Washington (who was African American). Ahead of his city council runoff election, which coincided with the general election for the Chicago mayoral election, Shaw tried to align himself as a supporter of Washington's campaign. Hutchison, however, had supported Washington against Byrne in the mayoral primary. During the runoff campaign, Hutchison complained of a pamphlet that was being distributed in the ward in support of Shaw's campaign that implied that Hutchison had been involved in drug trafficking.

=== Interregnum between tenures ===
In 1984, Shaw and his brother took up the cause of calling for legislation to be passed to require black history to be taught in public schools.

In December 1986, Shaw and his brother held a press conference in which they alleged that people were being denied care by health maintenance organizations (HMOs) for life threatening conditions.

=== Second tenure (1987–1998) ===
==== During the Washington and Sawyer mayoralties (1987–1989) ====
In 1987, Shaw defeated Hutchison to regain his old seat on the Chicago City Council. Hutchison had been indicted for taking bribes in a federal sting operation ahead of the election. For this campaign, Shaw repositioned himself as a supporter of Harold Washington. Shaw was a strong advocate in support of pay raises for members of the City Council. Shaw clashed numerous times with civil rights and community leader Jesse Jackson, who called Shaw "a hack". Harold Washington derided Shaw as a "two-bit hustler". Shaw was regarded to be a somewhat amusing personality on the council, providing interesting quotes and antics for the media to report upon. In 1990, John Kass of the Chicago Tribune noted that Shaw had a penchant for basking in the media attention he received, despite the media largely regarding him as clownish.

In September 1987, Shaw and fellow alderman Allan Streeter introduced a bill to remove the image of a sailing ship from the 150-year old city seal, alleging that it represented "official government sanction of slavery". Their legislation would replace the ship on the seal with a depiction of Jean Baptiste Point du Sable. City documents had once described the high-masted sailing ship on the seal as, "emblematic of the approach of white man's civilization and commerce". Shaw declared, "The ship represents institutionalized racism in this country." He also believed that it bore a resemblance to slave ships. Mayor Washington and a group of other black aldermen joined in support. Washington declared, speaking on the issue with the seal, "It's old, it's degrading, and it has historical baggage." It would have cost more than $1 million to replace the use of the seal. Shaw personally estimated that it would cost between $1.5 million and $2 million. The push to change the seal received criticism from some City Council members, such as Bernard Stone, who called it, "ridiculous", and Edward M. Burke who called it, "preposterous". The debate was reported to largely fall upon racial lines, with black aldermen supporting the change and white aldermen standing against it. The seal, ultimately, remained unchanged. In September 1987, Shaw also introduced a proposed ordinance that would require the Chicago Transit Authority to open its bathrooms.

After Harold Washington's death in office, Shaw joined Edward M. Burke in stopping Timothy C. Evans' bid to be appointed his mayoral successor. Eugene Sawyer instead won the vote to be Washington's successor. Shaw also called for a more thorough investigation into Washington's cause of death. Shaw was a chief backer of Sawyer during his mayoralty.

Shaw had a tendency to make racially inflammatory statements. In 1988, Shaw was criticized for questioning witnesses at City Council hearings about their ethnic backgrounds, and was also accused of having made antisemitic remarks about "Washington Jews". In regards to the allegations of antisemitism, Shaw, who had received his early political training from Jewish political operatives in the 24th Ward, defended himself by writing, "I have enjoyed a long and happy relationship with the Jewish community," and that, "my many Jewish friends and I am personally hurt," by the accusations of antisemitism. In 1988, Shaw also opposed a measure that would aim to stop the use of racial, ethnic, and sexual insults at committee hearings. He argued that it would infringe on the right of the council to, "protect the public interest." That same year, he also told the Chicago Defender, "A white should not be mayor. When they were mayor, they did not treat blacks and other minorities fairly. They do not know how to be fair."

Shaw utilized "aldermanic prerogative", a practice whereby alderman were given deference on zoning decisions in their wards. In 1988, on his own initiative he successfully championed downzoning for large areas in his ward.

==== During the mayoralty of Richard M. Daley (1989–1998) ====
During the mayoralty of Richard M. Daley, Shaw was a somewhat independent member of the council, giving criticism to the mayor and casting votes in opposition to his budgets. He was considered an adversary of Daley. In 1990, John Kass of the Chicago Tribune called him the, "only consistent critic of Richard Daley on the council floor." Daley and Shaw often argued with each other on the City Council Chamber floor. In one instance, Daley had Shaw's microphone turned-off, only for Shaw to continue yelling loudly at him. Shaw was reelected in 1991 and 1995. His 1991 reelection saw him defeat Chicago Transit Authority bus driver Johnny J. O'Neal by a mere 37 votes. O'Neal would subsequently, in 1993, attempt to have the legitimacy of the vote count reinvestigated through litigation.

In 1989, Shaw opposed legislation championed by Daley to create a watchdog to oversee all of city government. The ordinance later passed, but with revisions that made aldermen exempt from the new inspector general's oversight.

In 1990, Shaw proposed an ordinance to ban an AIDS awareness advertisement campaign that had seen posters placed on city transit that included same-sex couples kissing, claiming that the posters were, "promoting a lifestyle, which I object to." In January 1993 Shaw, joined by Dorothy Tillman, offered half-serious criticisms of former Chicago Bears coach Mike Ditka after Edward M. Burke proposed naming the 7th anniversary of the Bears' Super Bowl XX victory "Mike Ditka Day" in Chicago. In 1993, Shaw opposed Daley's nomination of Thomas Scorza to be appointed Chicago city clerk. Shaw opposed him due to testimony about improprieties in Scorza's office during his tenure as assistant U.S. Attorney. Shaw raised further allegations against Scorza, without providing any evidence publicly.

In 1996, as part of Operation Silver Shovel, the U.S. attorney's office subpoenaed financial records from Shaw's campaign and ward funds, as well as telephone records. Before this, federal agents had unsuccessfully sought to interview Shaw.

After resigning to serve on the Cook County Board of Review, he backed the candidacy of his son Herbert Shaw in the 1999 election to succeed him. However, Anthony Beale, a political unknown backed by Jesse Jackson Jr. and James Meeks, defeated him in an upset.

== Cook County Board of Review ==
In 1998, Shaw was elected in the inaugural election of the newly formed Cook County Board of Review (which was a restructuring of the former Cook County Board of Appeals), Shaw was elected in to as the commissioner from its 3rd district. He was reelected in 2002.

While on the board, Shaw was considered to be an ally of fellow board member Joseph Berrios, voting in lockstep with him on most cases. On occasion, however, he did dissent in a number of cases where Berrios and the board's third member, Maureen Murphy, both voted to lower the tax rates on large properties in downtown Chicago.

During his tenure, he was dubbed the "reduction commissioner". He was also criticized as handing out political and patronage favors. The Cook County state's attorney's office investigated accusations that Shaw had acted improperly by helping to arrange a property tax reduction for his brother (saving him as much as $1,219), but found no wrongdoing. Additionally, the Board of Review made changes to its policies on reviewing tax cases in response to the fact that several of Shaw's staff members had owned properties which they analyzed themselves in their positions. Cases where Shaw's staff had done this had been flagged by fellow board member Maureen Murphy.

In 2004, Shaw was narrowly unseated in the Democratic primary by Larry Rogers Jr. Rogers had been recruited to run against Shaw by Jesse Jackson Jr. and James Meeks. Jackson had been a regular political rival of Shaw brothers.

== Inspector General of Dolton ==
In 2006, Shaw's brother William, then the mayor of Dolton, Illinois, appointed him to be city's first inspector general, a newly created position that paid $70,000 annually. The position also gave Shaw use of a city-owned car. He was confirmed to the position by the city's trustees. This move angered some in the village, who saw it as blatant nepotism. The Better Government Association criticized this as a, "$70,000 joke on the taxpayers of Dolton". The position tasked Shaw with rooting out corruption in the village. However, village ordinance made it so that both the mayor (William Shaw) and village trustees were off-limits for investigation.

At the time he was appointed to this corruption watchdog position, federal investigators had actually been keeping an eye on Shaw himself for potential involvement in corruption in Dolton. In 2005, federal investigators discovered a practice that existed in Dolton and a number of other Chicago suburbs where politically connected citizens were allowed to carry guns and mimics of police badges. Those benefiting from this practice in Dolton had been individuals that had given notable sums of money to the campaigns of Shaw and his brother. It was discovered that at least two of those benefiting from this were drug smugglers that had used the mimicry police IDs in order to avoid having police search their vehicles.

In 2006, Shaw was criticized for flashing a handgun while personally conducting a traffic stop of an alleged drug dealer.

Shaw would remain in this position through the launch of his Cook County assessor campaign in late 2009.

== Political kingmaker ==
For more than a quarter century, Shaw and his brother William were dominant political "kingmakers" of Chicago's far South Side and southern suburbs. They garnered the support of the African American electorate in the area. Over the years, their main rivals for influence there was the Jackson family, Jesse Jackson and Jesse Jackson Jr. Their influence dissipated greatly in the late 1990s and the early 2000s, with Jesse Jackson Jr. largely beating them out to become the new kingmaker at the time. Their tide first began to change when Jesse Jackson Jr. won election to U.S. congress in 1996, defeating the Shaw brothers-backed candidate Emil Jones in the Democratic primary. In 1999, Jackson Jr. successfully backed Anthony Beale against Shaw's son Herbert Shaw in the race to succeed Shaw as 9th Ward alderman. In 2000, Jackson Jr. backed David E. Miller in his successful state representative Democratic primary race against Shaw-backed candidate Willis Harris. In 2002, Jackson Jr. encouraged James Meeks to make his successful general election challenge to William Shaw for state senate. Jackson accused the Shaw brothers, that same year, of being behind the dummy candidate campaign of a retired truck driver named Jesse L. Jackson against him for congress. In 2004, Jackson backed Larry Rogers Jr.'s successful primary challenge against Shaw for Cook County Board of Review. Also in 2004, the Shaw brothers denied involvement with two challengers running against Jackson for congress, who each filed challenges to the younger Jackson's petition signatures (which, if successful, would have seen Jackson removed from the ballot in the Democratic primary). The two challengers to Jackson worked for Dolton (where William Shaw was mayor), and used the village's attorney as their lawyer. By 2006, the Shaw brothers leveraged a Dolton public-access television program to regularly assail Jesse Jackson Jr.

When the Shaw brothers ran the 9th Ward Regular Democratic Organization, they and their campaign volunteers helped deliver strong voter support for campaigns of African American politicians such as Mayor Harold Washington and Illinois State Senator Emil Jones, and the 1992 U.S. Senate campaign of Carol Moseley Braun. They also helped mobilize support in the area for the 2004 U.S. Senate campaign of Barack Obama.

In 1996, Shaw was elected the 9th Ward Democratic committeeman, succeeding his brother William in holding this elected Democratic Party leadership position. In 2000, Shaw was unseated by Anthony Beale.

Among the individuals that got their starts in the political organization run by the Shaw brothers was Mose Jefferson.

After Shaw's death, the Chicago Crusader credited him and his brother's political organization with successfully pushing the Illinois State Legislature to establish new Cook County Circuit Court and Illinois Appellate Court sub-circuits located in African American city wards, which the Chicago Crusader wrote had the impact of enabling more than 60 African American individuals to become judges.

== Campaigns for other offices ==
=== 1984 congressional ===
In 1984, Shaw was one of four individuals who challenged incumbent U.S. congressman Gus Savage in the Democratic primary for Illinois's 2nd congressional district. Other challengers included state senators Glenn Dawson and James C. Taylor. Savage won renomination, with Shaw placing fourth.

=== 2005 South Holland village president ===
In October 2004, Shaw announced that he would be challenging incumbent village president (mayor) Don DeGraff in the April 2005 South Holland, Illinois, election. Shaw had moved from the Hyde Park neighborhood of Chicago to the southern suburb in 1999, shortly after he left the Chicago City Council. Shaw was defeated in an immense landslide, with DeGraff receiving 91% of the vote, to Shaw's 6%.

During his campaign, Shaw pledged to bring more business and job opportunities to the village, if elected. The village had a 10% unemployment rate at the time.

During the campaign, Shaw accused incumbent mayor DeGraff, who is white, of preventing more minorities from working for the village by utilizing the village's residency policy, which allowed village employees, with the exception of department heads and their deputies, to reside outside of the village. Shaw proposed making residency in the village a requirement for all village employees.

Shaw tried to characterize DeGraff as an "ultraconservative". Shaw claimed that DeGraff was a supporter of heavily conservative politician Alan Keyes, who had been the Republican Party nominee who ran against Democrat Barack Obama in the 2004 United States Senate election in Illinois. DeGraff refuted this by pointing out that he had supported Obama's campaign for the United States Senate. Shaw charged that DeGraff practiced nepotism as mayor. DeGraff denied that the allegations were true. Numerous businesses which Shaw alleged DeGraff had personally profiting from awarding contracts to either did not have any connection to DeGraff, or had not even received municipal contracts in South Holland.

A victory by Shaw would have helped to reestablish the Shaw brothers' declining political influence in the southern part of the Chicago area. Ahead of the election, commenting on Shaw's campaign in South Holland and his brother's coinciding reelection campaign in neighboring Dolton, Jennifer Shalka of the Chicago Tribune wrote, "a double win would give the Shaws their own fiefdom. Dolton and South Holland have a total of about 50,000 residents." Political rival Jesse Jackson Jr. supported DeGraff in Shaw's race, and also supported an unsuccessful challenger to Shaw's brother William in the Dolton election.

=== 2006 state house ===
In 2006, Shaw ran for the Democratic nomination for the 29th district seat in the Illinois House of Representatives, seeking to unseat incumbent David E. Miller. He was unsuccessful, losing to Miller by 70.88% to 29.12%.

The campaign was seen as another effort by Shaw to stop the decline of his and his brother's political power in Chicago's suburbs. Political observers saw Shaw as unlikely to succeed, however. This was another saga in the Shaw brothers' political rivalry with Jesse Jackson Jr., as Miller was considered Jackson's "point man" in the Illinois House of Representatives on matters such as education reform and the proposed Chicago south suburban airport. Jackson gave his backing to Miller in the election.

=== 2010 Cook County Assessor ===
Shaw ran for Cook County assessor in 2010. If elected, he would have been the first African American holder of the office. In January 2010, the Chicago Reader reported that Shaw's campaign lacked not only a website, but also lacked a campaign office and phone number. During the campaign, Shaw trained his criticisms at opponent Joseph Berrios, and largely ignored his other opponent, Raymond A. Figueroa. Since soon after incumbent assessor James Houlihan announced that he would not seek reelection, Berrios had been considered the front-runner in the race to succeed him.

Shaw placed second out of three candidates in the Democratic primary, with 34.09% of the vote, with the winner of the primary, Berrios, receiving 39.14% of the vote. Shaw had placed first in 19 of the 20 wards in Chicago with the most sizeable black populations.

=== 2015 Chicago mayoral ===
In December 2013, Shaw moved from South Holland, Illinois, where he had lived since 1999, to the Hyde Park–Kenwood area of Chicago. In March 2014, Shaw announced he would run in the 2015 Chicago mayoral election. He was the first noteworthy politician to announce that they would be challenging incumbent mayor Rahm Emanuel, and second challenger to announce, after Amara Enyia. However, he ultimately withdrew his candidacy.

In the previous 2011 mayoral election, Shaw had been an advisor to the campaign of Carol Moseley Braun.

During his candidacy, he took positions, including supporting a move to having the Chicago Board of Education be an elected school board. He criticized Emanuel for public school closures. He also voiced concern of the city's ability to fund pension programs for municipal employees, criticizing cutting benefits for retired workers. He pledged to rectify both previously-implemented school closings and decreases of benefits for retired municipal employees.

He described his campaign strategy as aiming to bring together a coalition of African Americans, Latinos, and others displeased with the policies of the incumbent mayor. He stated he believed that he had strength as a contender, saying that he believed he had strong name recognition. During his candidacy, an early July 2014 poll taken by We Ask America showed that, in a head-to-head matchup, incumbent mayor Rahm Emanuel led him 47.7% to 29.6%, with 22.8% of voters being undecided. Shaw's campaign had very low funds.

After dropping out, Shaw endorsed Willie Wilson in the election. Shaw would go on to again support Wilson in his 2019 mayoral campaign as well, taking part in his March 2018 campaign announcement.

=== 2016 and 2018 Metropolitan Water Reclamation District of Greater Chicago board ===
Shaw was a candidate in 2016 in the Democratic primary for the Metropolitan Water Reclamation District of Greater Chicago board. He withdrew his candidacy before the election, however. He declared again to run in 2018, but was ultimately disqualified from appearing on the ballot.

=== 2021 Dolton mayoral ===
In 2021, Shaw ran unsuccessfully for the mayoral office once held by his brother in Dolton, Illinois. He placed last out of four candidates in the Democratic Party primary, receiving six percent of the vote. His opponents were incumbent mayor Riley Rogers and village trustees Tiffany Henyard and Andrew Holmes. Shaw endorsed the primary's victor, Henyard, in the general election. Henyard won the general election.

== Personal life ==
Shaw fathered two sons and four daughters. In 1997, Shaw's 27-year-old son John was murdered by gunshots near his South Side Chicago house. From 1999 until 2013, Shaw lived in South Holland, Illinois. In December 2013, he moved to the Hyde Park–Kenwood area of Chicago.

At the peak of their political careers, Shaw and his brother were recognizable-looking for both wearing similar hairpieces.

In December 2008, in Dolton, Shaw, then still the village's inspector general, alleged that he had been assaulted in an altercation with corrections officer Elliott R. Kozel, who was circulating a petition in support of mayoral candidate Riley Rogers (the nephew of Larry Rogers, who had unseated Shaw on the Cook County Board of Review). The assault charges against Rogers were dismissed by a Cook County judge on February 18, 2009. In February 2012, Shaw was hospitalized after he fell and injured himself in his house. His injuries included a fractured nose.

Shaw contracted COVID-19 in 2021 during the COVID-19 pandemic, managing to overcome the viral infection.

=== Death ===
Shaw died at the age of 83 of cancer on July 22, 2021 at a rehabilitation facility in South Holland, Illinois.

== Electoral history ==
=== Chicago City Council elections ===
1975 Chicago 9th Ward aldermanic election
Candidate	Votes	%
Alexander Adducci (incumbent)	5,194	56.02
Robert Shaw	1,963	21.17
Perry Hutchison	1,799	19.40
Salim Al-Nurridin	315	3.40
Total votes	9,271	100

1979 Chicago 9th Ward aldermanic election
Candidate	General election		Runoff election	
Candidate	Votes	%	Votes	%
Robert Shaw	5,320	42.43	7,601	60.44
Alexander Adduci (incumbent)	4,860	38.76	4,976	39.56
Perry Hutchison	1,843	14.70		
Major Coleman	516	4.12		
Total votes	12,539	100	12,577	100

1983 Chicago 9th Ward aldermanic election
Candidate	General election		Runoff election	
Candidate	Votes	%	Votes	%
Perry H. Hutchison	7,640	37.44	13,502	65.63
Robert Shaw (incumbent)	7,340	35.97	7,071	34.37
Fred Jackson	1,458	7.15		
Charles M. White	1,013	4.96		
Constance J. Reddin	1,002	4.91		
James Meredith	980	4.80		
Melva Jean Tate	646	3.17		
Terence Steele	328	1.61		
Total votes	20,407	100	20,573	100

1987 Chicago 9th Ward aldermanic election
Candidate	General election		Runoff election	
Candidate	Votes	%	Votes	%
Robert Shaw	6,083	31.34	10,872	53.14
Perry Hutchison (incumbent)	5,362	27.63	9,587	46.86
Richard Dowdell	1,963	10.12		
Bernard Taylor	1,352	6.97		
Edna McCullough	1,128	5.81		
James Meredith	1,046	5.39		
James Owens	808	4.16		
Randolph Norris	683	3.52		
Johnny O'Neal	412	2.12		
William Wilson	337	1.74		
Heron O'Neal	233	1.20		
Total votes	19,407	100	20,459	100

1991 Chicago 9th Ward aldermanic election
Candidate	General election		Runoff election	
Candidate	Votes	%	Votes	%
Robert Shaw (incumbent)	4,290	43.4	4,904	50.20
Johnny J. O'Neal	1,647	16.7	4,864	49.80
Walter J. Stallings Jr.	921	9.3		
Richard J. Dowdell	718	7.3		
Wallace Jones Jr.	591	6.0		
Salim Al-Nurridin	472	4.8		
Cedric Michael Holt	292	3.0		
Eugene Wordon	272	2.8		
Vincent Williams	222	2.2		
Ernest Washington Jr.	159	1.6		
Total votes	9,584	100	9,768	100

1995 Chicago 9th Ward aldermanic election
Candidate	Votes	%
Robert Shaw (incumbent)	5,634	61.37
Cora L. Mcgruder	2,686	29.26
John J. O'Neal	861	9.38
Total votes	9,181	100

=== Cook County Board of Review elections ===
1998

1998 Cook County Board of Review 3rd district Democratic primary
Party	Candidate	Votes	%
Democratic	Robert Shaw	175,973	84.81
Democratic	Arvin Boddie	31,514	15.19
Total votes		207,487	100

1998 Cook County Board of Review 3rd district election
Party	Candidate	Votes	%
Democratic	Robert Shaw	406,862	100
Total votes		406,862	100

2002

2002 Cook County Board of Review 3rd district Democratic primary
Party	Candidate	Votes	%
Democratic	Robert Shaw (incumbent)	143,317	51.71
Democratic	Steven Burris	133,854	48.29
Total votes		277,171	100

2002 Cook County Board of Review 3rd district election
Party	Candidate	Votes	%
Democratic	Robert Shaw (incumbent)	374,527	100
Total votes		374,527	100

2004

2004 Cook County Board of Review 3rd district Democratic primary
Party	Candidate	Votes	%
Democratic	Larry R. Rogers Jr.	148,987	50.18
Democratic	Robert Shaw (incumbent)	147,900	49.81
Total votes		296,887	100

=== 9th Ward Democratic committeeman elections ===
1996 9th Ward Democratic Committeeman election
Party	Candidate	Votes	%
Democratic	Robert Shaw	6,539	100
Total votes		6,539	100

2000 9th Ward Democratic Committeeman election
Party	Candidate	Votes	%
Democratic	Anthony A. Beale	6,642	65.05
Democratic	Robert Shaw (incumbent)	3,185	31.19
Democratic	Valeria Smith	244	2.39
Democratic	Reginald B. Williams, Sr.	105	1.03
Democratic	Michael L. Miguest	34	0.33
Total votes		6,539	100

=== Cook County assessor election ===
2010 Cook County Assessor Democratic primary
Party	Candidate	Votes	%
Democratic	Joseph Berrios	203,397	39.14
Democratic	Robert Shaw	177,155	34.09
Democratic	Raymond A. Figueroa	139,164	26.78
Total votes		519,716	100

=== Illinois House of Representatives election ===
2006 Illinois's House of Representatives 29th district Democratic primary
Party	Candidate	Votes	%
Democratic	David E. Miller (incumbent)	9,942	70.88
Democratic	Robert Shaw	4,085	29.12
Total votes		14,027	100

=== South Holland village president election ===
2005 South Holland Village President election
Candidate	Votes	%
Don A. De Graff (incumbent)	6,761	91.86
Robert Shaw	456	6.20
Angela Thomas-Lots	143	1.94
Total votes	7,360	100

=== Dolton mayoral election ===
2021 Dolton mayoral Democratic primary election
Party	Candidate	Votes	%
Democratic	Tiffany A. Henyard	1,001	34.28
Democratic	Riley H. Rogers (incumbent)	888	30.41
Democratic	Andrew Holmes	862	29.52
Democratic	Robert Shaw	169	5.79
Total votes		2,920	100

=== United States House of Representatives election ===
1984 Illinois's 2nd congressional district Democratic primary
Party	Candidate	Votes	%
Democratic	Gus Savage (incumbent)	55,137	45.05
Democratic	Glenn V. Dawson	26,868	21.95
Democratic	Leon Davis	15,350	12.54
Democratic	Robert Shaw	15,316	12.51
Democratic	James C. Taylor	9,727	7.95
Democratic	Others	2	0.00
Total votes		72,400	100
