= Cook County Board of Commissioners 17th district =

- District
- District 17
- Current Board of Commissioners map, 17th district highlighted in red
- Country: United States
- State: Illinois
- County: Cook
- Townships and equivalent jurisdictions: list: Chicago; Elk Grove Township; Maine Township; Lemont Township; Leyden Township; Lyons Township; Orland Township; Palos Township; Proviso Township; Worth Township

Government
  - Type: District
  - Body: Cook County Board of Commissioners
  - Commissioner: Sean M. Morrison (R)

Cook County Board of Commissioners 17th district is a single-member electoral district for the Cook County Board of Commissioners. It is currently represented by Sean M. Morrison, a Republican. It is the only seat on the Board of Commissioners that is currently represented by a Republican.

== History ==
The district was established in 1994, when the board transitioned from holding elections in individual districts, as opposed to the previous practice of having two multi-member districts: one for ten members from the city of Chicago and another for seven members from suburban Cook County.

== Geography ==
=== 1994 boundaries ===
In its initial 1994 iteration, the district encompassed parts of the northwest, west, and southwest suburbs of Cook County.

=== 2001 redistricting ===
New boundaries were adopted in August 2001, with redistricting taking place following the 2000 United States census.

In regards to townships and equivalent jurisdictions, the district's redistricted boundaries included portions of the city of Chicago, as well as portions of Bremen, Elk Grove, Lemont, Leyden, Lyons, Maine, Northfield, Orland, Palos, Proviso, Wheeling, and Worth townships.

=== 2012 redistricting ===
The district, as redistricted in 2012 following the 2010 United States census, included parts of Bensenville, Berkeley, Burr Ridge, Brookfield, Chicago, Countryside, Des Plaines, Elk Grove Village, Elmhurst, Franklin Park, Hickory Hills, Hillsdale, Hillside, Hinsdale, Hodgkins, Homer Glen, Indian Head Park, Justice, La Grange, La Grange Park, Lemont, Northlake, Orland Park, Orland Hills, Palos Heights, Palos Hills, Palos Park, Park Ridge, Riverside, Rosment, Schiller Park, Tinley, Western Springs, Westcherster, Worth, Willow Springs.

In regards to townships and equivalent jurisdictions, it included portions of the city of Chicago, as well as portions of Bremen, Elk Grove, Lemont, Leyden, Lyons, Orland, Palos, Proviso, Maine, Riverside, and Worth townships.

The district almost entirely lied in suburban Cook County, as the only part of Chicago in the district was O'Hare International Airport and its direct surroundings.

The district was 144.60 square miles (92,544.64 acres).

=== 2022 redistricting ===
The district, as redistricted in 2022 following the 2020 United States census is contained portions of the city of Chicago as well as portions of Elk Grove, Maine, Lemont, Leyden, Lyons, Orland, Palos, Proviso, and Worth townships.

== Politics ==
The district has only had Republican commissioners since its inception, the only district for which this is the case. The district has been considered solidly Republican. Nevertheless, it saw a close result in its most recent election, which saw an unprecedentedly strong and well-funded effort by the Cook County Democratic Party to target the district.

For decades after its inception, the district was considered to be a Republican stronghold. However, in the 2016 United States presidential election, the Democratic ticket of Hillary Clinton and Tim Kaine won a strong victory in the district over the Republican ticket of Donald Trump and Mike Pence.

The district is currently the district represented by a Republican commissioner, and the only one to never have been represented by the Democratic commissioner.

== List of commissioners representing the district ==
Commissioner	Party	Years	Electoral history
Herb Schumann	Republican	December 1994–December 2002	Previously served two terms as commissioner from suburban Cook County at-large; elected in 1994 and 1998; lost reelection in 2002
Elizabeth Ann Doody Gorman	Republican	December 2002–July 20, 2015	Elected in 2002, 2006, 2010, 2014; resigned in July 2015
Sean M. Morrison	Republican	July 2015–present	Appointed in July 2015; elected in 2018 and 2022

== Election results ==
Cook County Board of Commissioners 17th district general elections
Year	Winning candidate	Party	Vote (pct)	Opponent	Party	Vote (pct)	Opponent	Party	Vote (pct)
1994	Herbert T. Schumann, Jr.	Republican	54,502 (65.85%)	William Hurley	Democratic	28,267 (34.15%)			
1998	Herbert T. Schumann, Jr.	Republican	50,720 (56.82%)	John K. Murphy	Democratic	38,545 (43.18%)			
2002	Elizabeth "Liz" Doody Gorman	Republican	53,212 (100%)						
2006	Elizabeth Doody Gorman	Republican	49,425 (55.60%)	Thomas "Tommy" Kraus	Democratic	39,473 (44.40%)			
2010	Elizabeth Doody Gorman	Republican	56,423 (58.59%)	Patrick Maher	Democratic	34,686 (36.02%)	Matthew J. Ogean	Green	5,194 (5.39%)
2014	Elizabeth Doody Gorman	Republican	56,926 (100%)						
2018	Sean M. Morrison	Republican	61,572 (50.57%)	Abdelnasser Rashid	Democratic	60,195 (49.43%)			
2022	Sean M. Morrison	Republican	55,426 (51.29%)	Daniel T. Calandriello	Democratic	52,638 (48.71%)			
