= Larry Rogers Jr. =

American lawyer

Larry Rogers
- Rogers at a 2024 Cook County Board of Review meeting

Member of the Cook County Board of Review from the 3rd district
- Incumbent
- Assumed office December 2004
- Preceded by: Robert Shaw

Personal details
- Born: 1967 or 1968 (age 57–58)
- Party: Democratic
- Education: University of California, Davis (BS); Illinois Institute of Technology (JD)

Larry R. Rogers Jr. (born 1967/1968) is an American lawyer and politician currently serving as commissioner of Cook County Board of Review from the 3rd district since 2004.

== Early life and education ==
Rogers is the son of lawyer Larry R. Rogers Sr. He was raised by his divorced mother, Judith, in California.

Rogers graduated from the University of California, Davis in 1990 with a Bachelor of Science in managerial economics. He graduated from Chicago-Kent College of Law with his Juris Doctor in January 1994. While at Chicago-Kent, he received American Jurisprudence Academy Award for Trial Advocacy in 1993. Rogers was admitted to the Illinois Bar on May 5, 1994.

== Law career ==
After joining the Illinois Bar, Rogers joined the Chicago firm of Power Rogers & Smith, becoming a trial lawyer focused on personal injury law.

An early success for Rogers came when he volunteered to assist Joseph A Power Jr. to represent Willis family, the plaintiffs in a wrongful death lawsuit. The lawsuit saw the family awarded $100 million for the loss of six siblings of the Willis family that were killed in a Wisconsin crash. This was reported to be the largest single-family settlement in United States history. The crash in question would lead to a federal investigation that discovered a scheme inside then-Illinois Secretary of State George Ryan's office in which unqualified truck drivers were given licenses in exchange for bribes. The investigation culminated in George Ryan going to prison.

Rogers has won numerous multimillion dollar jury awards and settlements. Notable cases which Rogers has tried included a case in which Rogers won $5 million for the estate of an individual killed by a 2004 Metra train crash and a 2007 medical malpractice lawsuit against the Michael Reese Hospital in which he won $7 million. He has also won settlements from American Airlines, the Chicago Park District, and Cook County Hospital among other defendants.

Rogers is now an equity partner at Power Rogers & Smith. His own father is a founding and title partner at the firm.

Since 2005, Rogers has been recognized as an Illinois Super Lawyer. He has also received recognition on Leading Lawyers Magazine's list of "top 100 lawyers".

From 2004 to 2005, Rogers served as president of the Cook County Bar Association, which is the United States' oldest association of African American lawyers in the country. He continues to be an active board member of the association.

Rogers has been involved in the American Association for Justice, American Trial Lawyers Association, Association for Professional Development in the African American Community, Illinois State Bar Association, Trial Lawyers for Public Justice.

Rogers served as chairperson of the Young Leadership Division of the National Bar Association from 2001 to 2002. He served as vice chairperson and coordinating counsel of minority fairs for the Chicago Bar Association from 1998 to 1999, and as chairperson of its Young Lawyers Division in 1998.

Rogers was invited to be a member of the Inner Circle of Advocates, a 100 member invitation-only group of trial lawyers from across the United States.

On June 5, 2020, Rogers became the president of the Illinois Trial Lawyers Association. He is the association's 67th president. He had been a member of the association since 1993, and had previously served on its board of managers as well as its executive committee. He is only the second African American president of the association, with the first having been his own father, who served as president from 2000 to 2001.

== Political career ==
=== Cook County Board of Review ===
In 2004, Rogers challenged incumbent Robert Shaw in the Democratic primary for his 3rd district seat on the Cook County Board of Review. Rogers, a political novice and first time candidate, had been recruited by James Meeks and Jesse Jackson Jr. to oust Shaw, a political rival of Jackson's. Despite having been considered a political newcomer, Rogers won the Democratic primary, and won the general election, unopposed.

Rogers would win reelection in 2008, 2012, 2014, and 2018. With the exception of 2008, he was unopposed in all of these years.

In his first two years on the board, many reforms he proposed were blocked by its other two members, Democrat Joseph Berrios and Republican Maureen Murphy. In 2006, Rogers supported Democrat Brendan Houlihan's ultimately successful bid to unseat Murphy in her Republican-leaning district.

In August 2010, Chicago magazine made public that documents reveal that Rogers and Houlihan had expressed concern in May 2009 about how Berrios' staff had been processing tax appeals championed Paul Froehlich.

In 2016, an ethics probe was launched to investigate whether Rogers had profited when his law firm sued the county government, which would be in violation of provisions in the county code.

In August 2018, Chicago Tribune exposed that Rogers had taken excessive campaign contributions. The Cook County Ethics Board fined Rogers and demanded that he return $44,800. In February 2026, the organization Injustice Watch published a profile which flagged ethics concerns about campaign donations that Rogers and his fellow Board of Review commissioners had accepted in 2017 and 2018 from real estate professionals with business before the board.

=== Prospective 2011 mayoral campaign ===
In 2011, some had urged Rogers to run for mayor, but he ultimately declined to. However, he initially considered running. In October 2010, the Chicago Coalition for Mayor, seeking to find a "consensus" black candidate for mayor, named him and Carol Moseley Braun as the finalists in its search.

== Nonprofit and community work ==
From 1997 to 1999, Rogers served on the board of directors of the Robert Taylor Boys & Girls Club of Chicago. He served on the board of directors of Windows of Opportunity from 1998 through 2000, and was elected to serve as the chairperson of its auxiliary board of directors from 1996 to 2000. He served on the board of directors of the Illinois Institute of Continuing Legal Education from 1999 to 2001.

Rogers has been involved in the Rainbow/PUSH Coalition and the NAACP.

He has served on the board of trustees for Providence St. Mel School since 2003.

== Personal life ==
Rogers and his wife Rolanda have four children, son Dominique and daughters Erin, Jordan and Sydney.

At the time he was first elected to the Cook County Board of Commissioners, Rogers and his family lived in the Hyde Park neighborhood of Chicago.

== Electoral history ==
2004

2004 Cook County Board of Review 3rd district Democratic primary
Party	Candidate	Votes	%
Democratic	Larry R. Rogers, Jr.	148,987	50.18
Democratic	Robert Shaw (incumbent)	147,900	49.81
Total votes		296,887	100

2004 Cook County Board of Review 3rd district election
Party	Candidate	Votes	%
Democratic	Larry R. Rogers, Jr.	518,543	100
Total votes		518,543	100

2008

2008 Cook County Board of Review 3rd district Democratic primary
Party	Candidate	Votes	%
Democratic	Larry R. Rogers, Jr. (incumbent)	323,842	100
Total votes		323,842	100

2008 Cook County Board of Review 3rd district election
Party	Candidate	Votes	%
Democratic	Larry R. Rogers, Jr. (incumbent)	573,194	88.69
Republican	Lionel Garcia	49,680	7.69
Green	Antonne "Tony" Cox	23,455	3.63
Total votes		646,329	100

2012

2012 Cook County Board of Review 3rd district Democratic primary
Party	Candidate	Votes	%
Democratic	Larry Rogers, Jr. (incumbent)	170,821	100
Total votes		170,821	100

2012 Cook County Board of Review 3rd district election
Party	Candidate	Votes	%
Democratic	Larry Rogers, Jr. (incumbent)	584,624	100
Total votes		584,624	100

2014

2014 Cook County Board of Review 3rd district Democratic primary
Party	Candidate	Votes	%
Democratic	Larry Rogers, Jr. (incumbent)	109,750	100
Total votes		109,750	100

2014 Cook County Board of Review 3rd district election
Party	Candidate	Votes	%
Democratic	Larry Rogers, Jr. (incumbent)	386,382	100
Total votes		386,382	100

2018

2018 Cook County Board of Review 3rd district Democratic primary
Party	Candidate	Votes	%
Democratic	Larry Rogers, Jr. (incumbent)	228,367	100
Total votes		228,367	100

2018 Cook County Board of Review 3rd district election
Party	Candidate	Votes	%
Democratic	Larry Rogers, Jr. (incumbent)	480,701	100
Total votes		480,701	100

2022

2022 Cook County Board of Review 3rd district Democratic primary
Party	Candidate	Votes	%
Democratic	Larry Rogers, Jr. (incumbent)	160,923	100
Total votes		160,923	100

2022 Cook County Board of Review 3rd district election
Party	Candidate	Votes	%
Democratic	Larry Rogers Jr. (incumbent)	375,518	100
Total votes		375,518	100

2024
