= Dan Patlak =

American politician

Commissioner of Cook County Board of Review from the 1st district
- In office December 2010 – December 2020
- Preceded by: Brendan Houlihan
- Succeeded by: Tammy Wendt

Wheeling Township Assessor
- In office 2005–2010
- Preceded by: Dolores Stephan
- Succeeded by: Jerry Sadler

Personal details
- Born: March 1962 (age 64)
- Party: Republican
- Education: Valparaiso University

Dan Patlak (born March 1962) is an American politician who has served as a member of the Cook County Board of Review from the 1st district from 2010 to 2020. Before this he served as Wheeling Township assessor from 2005 to 2010.

== Early life, education, and career ==
Patlak was born in March 1962.

Patlak graduated from Valparaiso University with a bachelor's degree in business administration.

Patlak worked as a real estate broker from 1986 until 1995.

In the 1990s, Patlak became an anti-tax activist. From 1992 to 1994, he was a volunteer coordinator for Citizens Against Government Waste. He organized "Tax Action Day Rallies" at the Kluczynski Federal Building and Daley Plaza. He testified before the Cook County Board of Commissioners in opposition to a $0.75 county sales tax.

Patlak is a Graduate of the Real Estate Institute and is a member of the National Realtors Association and Illinois Realtors Association.

Patlak served on the East Maine Elementary School District 63 Board from 1995 to 1997, having won election to it in 1995.

He served as press secretary for Al Salvi during Salvi's 1996 U.S. Senate campaign.

From January 1999 to December 2006, he was employed at the Cook County Board of Review as a property assessment appeal analyst and public information officer for commissioner Maureen Murphy.

Patlak became a Certified Illinois Assessing Officer.

Patak is a member of the National Taxpayers Union. He is also a member of the International Association of Assessing Officers.

In 2005, Patlak was elected the assessor of Wheeling Township, unseating 24-year incumbent Dolores Stephen. He was reelected in 2009, running unopposed.

== Cook County Board of Review ==
In 2010, Patlak was elected to the Cook County Board of Review from the 1st district. In the Republican primary, he defeated Sean M. Morrison. In the general election, he unseated first-term Democratic incumbent Brendan Houlihan.

Patlak was reelected in 2012 and 2016.

Patlak gave his support to Illinois Senate Bill 3356, which would extend the period for payment of delinquent property taxes from nine months to thirteen months.

In 2020, he was narrowly unseated by Democratic nominee Tammy Wendt.

In February 2026, the organization Injustice Watch published a profile which flagged ethics concerns about campaign donations that Patlak and his fellow Board of Review commissioners had accepted in 2017 and 2018 from real estate professionals with business before the board.

== Personal life ==
Patlak resides in Wheeling, Illinois with his wife Dulce and son Teddy. He is a member of his local Knights of Columbus chapter.

== Electoral history ==
=== Wheeling Township Assessor ===
2005 Wheeling Township Assessor election
Party	Candidate	Votes	%
Republican	Dan Patlak	8,983	53.01
BPP	Delores Stephan (incumbent)	7,964	46.99
Total votes		16,947	100

2009 Wheeling Township Assessor election
Party	Candidate	Votes	%
Republican	Dan Patlak (incumbent)	14,238	100
Total votes		14,238	100

=== Cook County Board of Review ===
2010

2010 Cook County Board of Review 1st district Republican primary
Party	Candidate	Votes	%
Republican	Dan Patlak	48,218	52.51
Republican	Sean M. Morrison	43,600	47.49
Total votes		91,818	100

2010 Cook County Board of Review 1st district election
Party	Candidate	Votes	%
Republican	Dan Patlak	256,891	51.69
Democratic	Brendan F. Houlihan (incumbent)	240,070	48.31
Total votes		496,961	100

2012

2012 Cook County Board of Review 1st district Republican primary
Party	Candidate	Votes	%
Republican	Dan Patlak (incumbent)	59,778	53.68
Republican	Sean M. Morrison	51,577	46.32
Total votes		111,355	100

2012 Cook County Board of Review 1st district election
Party	Candidate	Votes	%
Republican	Dan Patlak (incumbent)	316,190	51.52
Democratic	Casey Thomas Griffin	297,517	48.48
Total votes		613,707	100

2016

2016 Cook County Board of Review 1st district Republican primary
Party	Candidate	Votes	%
Republican	Dan Patlak (incumbent)	132,977	100
Total votes		132,977	100

2016 Cook County Board of Review 1st district election
Party	Candidate	Votes	%
Republican	Dan Patlak (incumbent)	353,705	51.89
Democratic	Marty Stack	327,998	48.11
Total votes		681,703	100

2020

2020 Board of Review 1st district Republican primary
Party	Candidate	Votes	%
Republican	Dan Patlak (incumbent)	43,625	100
Total votes		43,625	100

2020 Board of Review 1st district election
Party	Candidate	Votes	%
Democratic	Tammy Wendt	394,202	50.75
Republican	Dan Patlak (incumbent)	382,509	49.25
Total votes		776,711	100
