= Sean M. Morrison =

American politician

Sean Morrison

Member of the Cook County Board of Commissioners from the 17th district
- Incumbent
- Assumed office July 26, 2015
- Preceded by: Liz Gorman

Chair of the Cook County Republican Party
- In office April 14, 2016 – 2025
- Preceded by: Aaron Del Mar
- Succeeded by: Aaron Del Mar

Personal details
- Party: Republican
- Spouse: Lora
- Children: 2
- Education: Moraine Valley Community College

Sean M. Morrison is an American politician currently serving as Cook County commissioner from the 17th district and the former chair of the Cook County Republican Party. Morrison is the only Republican serving on the Cook County Boards of Commissioners.

== Early life and education ==
Morrison was born in 1967 or 1968.

Morrison attended Moraine Valley Community College, a two-year college, majoring in business and accounting.

== Private-sector career ==
=== Early career ===
Morrison began working in the security industry in 1986, working as a district loss prevention manager for seven years.

=== Morrison Security ===
Morrison is the CEO and founder of Morrison Security (the full corporate name of the company being "Morrison Security Corporation, Morrison Security Group & Morrison Investigations Inc.") Morrison founded the company in 1993, starting as an owner and partner. He held the positions of president, director of operations, and vice president of operations. In 1999, he became the sole proprietor of the company.

Morrison has claimed that Morrison Security has in excess of 800 employees and subcontractor employees.

Morrison has served on the boards of a number of security organizations. He has been a member of the American Society of Industrial Security, Illinois Security Chiefs Association, and the Associated Detectives of Illinois.

Morrison's business partner Richard Peters founded Associated Construction Management as a sister firm to the Morrison Security.

In August 2013, Anthony Martin, a top executive of the company was arrested by Orland Park police officers under the charges of "solicitation to meet a child", for having attempted to solicit sex from a minor via text messages. Despite this, Morrison allowed Martin to remain on the job, managing 450 employees. In 2014, Morrison wrote a letter to a Circuit Court of Cook County judge John J. Hynes, arguing that Martin should be allowed to work out of state despite being a defendant in a pending criminal case. He argued that Morrison, a decade-long employee of the company, was, "instrumental in running" the company. Nineteen after Morrison wrote the letter to the judge, on a business trip to Colorado, Martin was arrested for using the internet to again attempt to solicit sex from an underage girl, being caught in a sting operation in which the Jefferson County District Attorney's office had an investigator pose online as a 14-year-old girl. After this second arrest, Morrison fired Martin. Martin ultimately pleaded guilty in Colorado, being given a six-year suspended sentence before being transferred to Illinois, where he was sentenced for his initial crime to a three-year prison sentence. In June 2018, the Chicago Sun-Times published a story on all of this.

=== Sean Morrison Entertainment ===
Morrison ran an entertainment company called Sean Morrison Entertainment. It was an Illinois limited liability company. The company was involved in the production of the Ultimate Women Challenge, with Morrison financing it.

== Nonprofit work ==
In 2009, Morrison co-founded and funded "Operation Restoring Innocence", a 501(c)(3) organization which focuses on rescuing and recovering exploited and missing children. Morrison received the LEADS "Humanitarian of the Year Award" in 2011 for his work.

== Political career ==
In 2007, he was nominated to serve as an Illinois delegate at the House Republican Trust Candidate's Convention.

In In 2010 and 2012, Morrison ran unsuccessfully for the Republican nomination for the Cook County Board of Review's 1st district, losing both times to Dan Patlak.

On October 14, 2015, Morrison was announced as an Illinois state co-chair of John Kasich's presidential campaign.

=== Cook County Commissioner ===
On July 22, 2015, Morrison was appointed to finish the unexpired term of Elizabeth Ann Doody Gorman, who had resigned as Cook County commissioner from the 17th district in order to accept a private sector job.

In April 2016, Morrison secured a grant of naloxone to supply for the Cook County police departments.

In October 2016, Morrison and all three other Republican members of the Cook County Board of Commissioners voted against a paid sick leave mandate which the Cook County Board of Commissions passed, all arguing that the county lacked the home rule authority to enforce employment or labor mandates. After its passage, Morrison denounced it, proclaiming, "this is illegal."

Morrison opposed the sweetened beverage tax passed by the Cook County Board of Commissioners on November 10, 2016. Morrison would lead a successful effort to repeal it in October 2017.

In 2018, Morrison was elected outright to a full term by a narrow 1.14% margin over Democrat Abdelnasser Rashid.

Morrison has been a strong supporter of charter schools, but has received some scrutiny for his support of ones that have been regarded as failing.

Morrison introduced a proclamation that would honor April as "Arab American Heritage Month". It passed unanimously at the Cook County Board of Commissioners' March 20, 2019 meeting.

In 2019, when a bill that would have seen the Board of Commissioners urge the Illinois General Assembly to pass HB2495 (The Reproductive Health Act), Morrison voiced his "pro-life" stance.

In 2019, Morrison cast the lone vote against the 2020 Cook County budget.

In 2020, amid the COVID-19 pandemic, Morrison co-sponsored legislation by Scott R. Britton which would enable the county to share the addresses of individual that had tested positive for COVID-19 with police and fire chiefs in the county's various jurisdictions.

In 2022, Morrison's predecessor, Liz Gorman, announced her intention to challenge Morrison in the 2022 Republican primary. Morrison defeated Gorman in the primary. Morrison won reelection narrowly in the general election. With his 2.58% margin of victory, Morrison was the only Republican nominee to win any of Cook County's partisan races in the county's 2022 election.

=== Republican party leadership roles ===
Morrison serves as committeeperson for the Palos Township, thereby chairing the Palos Township Republican Organization. He has served in this position since January 19, 2012, having been appointed by Cook County Republican Party chairman Sig Vaznelis to hold the committeeperson position formerly occupied by Lee Roupas. He was reelected to the position in 2014, 2018, and 2022.

Morrison serves as Republican state central committeeman for Illinois's 3rd congressional district.

On July 24, 2013, Morrison was appointed by Cook County Republican Party chairman Aaron Del Mar as Cook County Republican Party deputy chairman, a position he would continue to hold until being elected chairman himself in April 2016.

==== Chairmanship of the Cook County Republican Party ====
On April 14, 2016, Morrison was elected by his fellow Cook County Republican committeemen to serve as chairman of the Cook County Republican Party. His predecessor, Aaron Del Mar, opted not to seek reelection to the position, and had given his support for Morrison, who had been his deputy chairman, to be made his successor. He was reelected in April 2018 and April 2020.

In September 2017, Morrison criticized Republican Illinois governor Bruce Rauner for signing HB 40, which removed a provision that excluded abortions, induced miscarriages, and premature births from the list of services provided under the State's medical assistance program.

In 2018, Morrison urged Republicans not to vote for Arthur J. Jones, a neo-Nazi that received the Republican nomination for Illinois' 3rd congressional district after running unopposed in the Republican primary. He urged Republicans to instead abstain from voting in the congressional race. As the election neared, Morrison announced he and Illinois Republican Party chairman Tim Schneider would record a robocall urging people against voting for Jones.

Morrison got into conflicts with Chicago Republican Party president Chris Cleveland, who would ultimately resign as Chicago Republican Party chairman in late-2019. Morrison attracted criticism from Cleveland for not appointing individuals to fill vacancies for several Chicago ward committeepeople positions. In January 2018, Chicago Republican Party chairman Chris Cleveland attempted to appoint "acting" committeepeople, drawing a harsh rebuke from Morrison who accused Cleveland of attempting to "usurp the statutory authority" of the Cook County Republican Party. Also in January 2018, Morrison criticized Cleveland for having endorsed Jeanne Ives, the primary election challenger to incumbent Republican governor Bruce Rauner in the 2018 Illinois gubernatorial election.

After Bruce Rauner shared revelations that he had considered abandoning his candidacy for reelection as governor following his underperformance in the 2018 Republican gubernatorial primary, Morrison criticized Rauner as having abandoned his campaign and the party. He also criticized Rauner for failing to expand mail-in voting and early voting, as he had promised, steps that may have boosted Republican turnout in the 2018 election.

Under Morrison, the Cook County Republican Party filed a lawsuit in August 2020 to block the state's new laws surrounding mail-in voting, which aimed to increase access to mail-in voting amid the COVID-19 pandemic.

In the aftermath of the 2021 United States Capitol attack, Morrison released a statement which condemned the "disgraceful and lawless behavior", and which also compared it to the George Floyd protests, a comparison that other Republicans also made, and a comparison that critics have argued draws a false equivalence.

In 2025, Morrison resigned as chair. On April 22, 2025, Aaron Del Mar was elected to succeed him as chair.

== Personal life ==
Morrison lives in Palos Park, Illinois with his wife Lora, who is a registered nurse. He and his wife have two daughters.

== Awards ==
In 2005, he received the Ronald Reagan Republican Gold Medal.

Morrison received the LEADS "Humanitarian of the Year Award" in 2011 for his work with Operation Restoring Innocence.

For his work to repeal the county's "soda tax", Morrison was one of twenty-three 2018 recipients the Tax Foundation's "Outstanding Achievement in State Tax Reform" award.

== Electoral history ==
=== Cook County Board of Review ===
2010 Cook County Board of Review 1st district Republican primary
Party	Candidate	Votes	%
Republican	Dan Patlak	48,218	52.51
Republican	Sean M. Morrison	43,600	47.49
Total votes		91,818	100

2012 Cook County Board of Review 1st district Republican primary
Party	Candidate	Votes	%
Republican	Dan Patlak (incumbent)	59,778	53.68
Republican	Sean M. Morrison	51,577	46.32
Total votes		111,355	100

=== Cook County Board of Commissioners ===
2018 Cook County Board of Commissioners 17th district Republican primary
Party	Candidate	Votes	%
Republican	Sean M. Morrison (incumbent)	16,189	100
Total votes		16,189	100

2018 Cook County Board of Commissioners 17th district election
Party	Candidate	Votes	%
Republican	Sean M. Morrison (incumbent)	61,572	50.57
Democratic	Abdelnasser Rashid	60,195	49.43
Total votes		88,590	100

2022 Cook County Board of Commissioners 17th district Democratic primary
Party	Candidate	Votes	%
Republican	Sean M. Morrison (incumbent)	11,615	57.05
Republican	Elizabeth "Liz" Doody Gorman	8,745	42.95
Total votes		20,360	100.0

2022 Cook County Board of Commissioners 17th district election
Party	Candidate	Votes	%
Republican	Sean M. Morrison (incumbent)	55,426	51.29
Democratic	Daniel T. Calandriello	52,638	48.71
Total votes		108,064	100

=== Palos Township Republican Committeeman ===
2014 Palos Township Republican committeeperson
Party	Candidate	Votes	%
Republican	Sean M. Morrison (incumbent)	3,318	100
Total votes		3,318	100

2018 Palos Township Republican committeeperson
Party	Candidate	Votes	%
Republican	Sean M. Morrison (incumbent)	2,623	100
Total votes		2,623	100

2022 Palos Township Republican committeeperson
Party	Candidate	Votes	%
Republican	Sean M. Morrison (incumbent)	2,885	100
Total votes		2,885	100
