= James Houlihan =

American politician

- Houlihan, circa 1977

Cook County Assessor
- In office 1997 – December 6, 2010
- Preceded by: Thomas Hynes
- Succeeded by: Joseph Berrios

Illinois State Representative
- In office 1973–1979 Serving with Robert L. Thompson (1973–1975); Jesse White (1975–1979)
- Preceded by: John B. Brandt/Howard W. Carroll
- Succeeded by: Daniel P. O'Brien

Personal details
- Born: 1942 or 1943
- Party: Democratic

James Houlihan is an American politician who served as Cook County assessor from 1997 to 2010 and as an Illinois state representative from 1973 to 1979.

== Early life ==
Houlihan was born in 1942 or 1943. Houlihan was born and raised in the 19th ward on Chicago's far southwest side.

== Career ==
Houlihan was a protégé of Thomas Hynes, the Cook County assessor and 19th Ward political boss.

In the 1970s, Houlihan served as an independent-minded Illinois state representative from a district on Chicago's northern lakefront. He had ties to prominent lakefront liberals. He was elected in 1972 and reelected in 1974, but was defeated in the 1978 Democratic primary.

Houlihan later served as a senior aide to Chicago mayor Harold Washington. He subsequently became a deputy assessor in Thomas Hynes's office as Cook County assessor.

=== Cook County Assessor ===
In March 1997, Thomas Hynes resigned after 18 years as Cook County assessor. The Cook County Board of Commissioners appointed Houlihan to fill the vacancy, with Hynes supporting the appointment. Houlihan was later elected in 1998 and reelected in 2002 and 2006. He did not seek reelection in 2010.

At the time Houlihan took office, residential properties in Cook County were undervalued. Rather than correcting the assessments, a step that would have increased taxes for many homeowners and risked political opposition, his office kept residential assessments artificially low and also began reducing rates for commercial and industrial properties. According to a later investigation by the Chicago Tribune, the resulting distortion of residential values left the county's property tax system severely miscalibrated and may have conflicted with the Constitution of Illinois.

During his tenure, Houlihan's office was reported to have disregarded legal requirements and operated outside professional assessment standards.

Houlihan also had a political rivalry with Cook County Board of Review member Joseph Berrios. In 2006, he privately supported Brendan Houlihan, who was not related to him, in a successful challenge to Maureen Murphy for the 1st district seat on the Cook County Board of Review. Murphy had been an ally of Berrios on the board.

In 2007, Houlihan criticized Michael Madigan's proposal to cap property tax assessments. He argued that, compared with stalled legislation he supported, Madigan's bill would save owners of Chicago Loop skyscrapers represented by Madigan's law firm hundreds of thousands of dollars in taxes.

In 2010, Houlihan accused Joseph Berrios and Michael Madigan of withholding information from taxpayers that could affect the November general election.

That same year, Houlihan said he was considering a campaign for mayor of Chicago in the 2011 Chicago mayoral election. He ultimately did not enter the race.

=== Later career ===
After leaving office, Houlihan became a state lobbyist.

He also served on the Commission on Chicago Landmarks. His tenure on the commission ended in 2019.

== Electoral history ==
=== Illinois State Representative ===
1972

1972 Illinois House of Representatives 13th district Democratic primary
| Party | Candidate | Votes | % |
|---|---|---|---|
| Democratic | James M. Houlihan | 61,549 ½ | 54.93 |
| Democratic | Robert L. Thompson | 24,356 | 21.74 |
| Democratic | Ira Colitz | 18,184 | 16.23 |
| Democratic | Judith A. Lonnquist | 7,959 ½ | 7.10 |

1972 Illinois House of Representatives 13th district election
| Party | Candidate | Votes | % |
|---|---|---|---|
| Democratic | James M. Houlihan | 90,286 ½ | 42.77 |
| Democratic | Robert L. Thompson | 44,528 | 21.10 |
| Republican | Paul J. Randolph | 43,624 | 20.67 |
| Republican | Hawley H. Sodder | 32,641 ½ | 15.46 |

1974

1974 Illinois House of Representatives 13th district Democratic primary
| Party | Candidate | Votes | % |
|---|---|---|---|
| Democratic | James M. Houlihan (incumbent) | 41,486 | 43.41 |
| Democratic | Jesse C. White, Jr. | 27,100 ½ | 28.36 |
| Democratic | James Terrence Arvey | 25,355 | 26.53 |
| Democratic | Marshall James Pidgeon | 1,625 | 1.70 |

1974 Illinois House of Representatives 13th district election
| Party | Candidate | Votes | % |
|---|---|---|---|
| Democratic | James M. Houlihan (incumbent) | 53,844 | 41.41 |
| Democratic | Jesse C. White, Jr. | 34,851 | 26.80 |
| Republican | Paul J. Randolph | 22,702 ½ | 17.46 |
| Republican | Tom McNamara | 18,625 | 14.33 |

1978

1978 Illinois House of Representatives 13th district Democratic primary
| Party | Candidate | Votes | % |
|---|---|---|---|
| Democratic | Jesse C. White, Jr. (incumbent) | 27,612 | 35.01 |
| Democratic | Daniel P. O'Brien | 25,291 | 32.07 |
| Democratic | James M. Houlihan (incumbent) | 20,112 | 25.50 |
| Democratic | Gary Nepon | 5,859 | 7.43 |
| Total votes | | 78,874 | 100 |

=== Cook County Assessor ===
1998

1998 Cook County Assessor Democratic primary
| Party | Candidate | Votes | % |
|---|---|---|---|
| Democratic | James M. Houlihan (incumbent) | 330,292 | 100 |
| Total votes | | 330,292 | 100 |

1998 Cook County Assessor election
| Party | Candidate | Votes | % |
|---|---|---|---|
| Democratic | James M. Houlihan (incumbent) | 926,646 | 75.58 |
| Republican | Jose Carlos Gomez | 260,245 | 21.23 |
| Justice Party | Philip Morris | 39,111 | 3.19 |
| Total votes | | 1,226,002 | 100 |

2002

2002 Cook County Assessor Democratic primary
| Party | Candidate | Votes | % |
|---|---|---|---|
| Democratic | James Houlihan (incumbent) | 534,407 | 100 |
| Total votes | | 534,407 | 100 |

2002 Cook County Assessor election
| Party | Candidate | Votes | % |
|---|---|---|---|
| Democratic | James Houlihan (incumbent) | 954,774 | 75.78 |
| Republican | James P. Pieczonka | 305,176 | 24.22 |
| Total votes | | 1,259,950 | 100 |

2006

2006 Cook County Assessor Democratic primary
| Party | Candidate | Votes | % |
|---|---|---|---|
| Democratic | James Houlihan (incumbent) | 492,077 | 100 |
| Total votes | | 492,077 | 100 |

2006 Cook County Assessor election
| Party | Candidate | Votes | % |
|---|---|---|---|
| Democratic | James Houlihan (incumbent) | 1,010,400 | 80.41 |
| Republican | Ralph Conner | 246,186 | 19.59 |
| Total votes | | 1,256,586 | 100 |
