= Brendan Houlihan =

American politician

Commissioner of Cook County Board of Review from the 1st district
- In office December 2006 – December 2010
- Preceded by: Maureen Murphy
- Succeeded by: Dan Patlak

Personal details
- Party: Democratic
- Education: Northern Illinois University (B.S.)

Brendan Francis Houlihan (born 1963 or 1964) is an American politician who served a single term as commissioner on the Cook County Board of Review from the 1st district from 2006 to 2010.

== Early life ==
Houlihan was born in either 1963 or 1964.

He earned a Bachelor of Science degree in finance from Northern Illinois University. He is also an alumnus of the Appraisal Institute of Chicago.

After college, Houlihan began his career at the Chicago Options Exchange, where he worked as a price reporter. He later worked at the Chicago Board of Trade as a runner for the Chicago Corporation. He subsequently worked in finance.

== Cook County Board of Review ==
In 2006, Houlihan ran to be commissioner of Cook County Board of Review from the 1st district. He was a first-time candidate for public office. Houlihan largely lacked the support of the state and county Democratic Party organizations. He did have the public backing Wheeling Township Democratic committeeman Patrick Botterman, considered a political maverick. He was also endorsed by the Chicago Federation of Labor for the Democratic primary. After incumbent Republican Maureen Murphy successfully challenged his nomination petitions, he had been removed from the Democratic primary ballot. However, since, consequentially no candidate appeared on the ballot in the Democratic primary, state law enabled the Democratic committeemen from the Board of Review's 1st district to pick a nominee. Southwest-side Democrats supported Bloom Township committeeman Terry Matthews. However, Botterman was able to garner the support of enough committeemen to nominate Houlihan. In the general election, he received the backing of 3rd district Cook County Board of Review commissioner Larry Rogers, Jr. He also received behind-the-scenes support from Cook County assessor James Houlihan (of no relation). Houlihan was an underdog in the election. He won the election, unseating second-term incumbent Republican Maureen Murphy. His victory came in a strong election year for Democrats, and despite the fact that the district had been drawn to lean Republican. His campaign was helped by a last-minute influx of cash from a Larry Rogers, Jr. and James Houlihan, just over a week before the election, which enabled him to send direct mail and buy radio and television advertisements in the final stretch of his campaign. His win was considered a surprise. His victory made the Board of Review entirely Democratic for the first time since its current form was established in 1998.

Days into his tenure, he and fellow board member Larry Rogers, Jr. joined together to fire the board's "deputy chief commissioner" Thomas Jaconetty, an ally of the board's remaining member Joseph Berrios. Houlihan's predecessor Murphy had formed an alliance with Berrios, and had supported Jaconetty. She had also joined Berrios in resisting other reforms proposed by Rogers.

Houlihan criticized the 2008 1% sales tax implemented by the Cook County Board of Commissioners.

In August 2010, Chicago magazine made public that documents reveal that Rogers and Houlihan had expressed concern in May 2009 about how Berrios' staff had been processing tax appeals championed Paul Froehlich.

In 2010, he lost reelection to Republican nominee Dan Patlak. When seeking reelection, he sought to distance himself from the other commissioners of the Board of Review, particularly Berrios, as the Board of Review was under investigation by the Cook County State's Attorney's office.

== Later career ==
In 2014, Houlihan unsuccessfully ran in the Democratic primary to be a commissioner on the board of the Metropolitan Water Reclamation District of Greater Chicago. There was speculation that, had he won, he would have used that victory as a stepping-stone for running again to retake his former seat on the Cook County Board of Review.

Houlihan was a delegate from the Illinois's 1st congressional district to the 2016 Democratic National Convention, pledged to Bernie Sanders.

In 2019, Houlihan ran for election in an election to a six-year term on the Moraine Valley Community College board. He lost, placing sixth out of eight (with 10,290 votes), with only the top-three finishers winning election.

== Personal life ==
Houlihan lives in Palos Heights, Illinois.

== Electoral history ==
=== Cook County Board of Review ===
2006

2006 Cook County Board of Review 1st district election
Party	Candidate	Votes	%
Democratic	Brendan F. Houlihan	245,227	51.48
Republican	Maureen Murphy (incumbent)	231,153	48.52
Total votes		476,380	100

2010

2010 Cook County Board of Review 1st district Democratic primary
Party	Candidate	Votes	%
Democratic	Brendan F. Houlihan (incumbent)	109,750	100
Total votes		109,750	100

Cook County Board of Review 1st district election
Party	Candidate	Votes	%
Republican	Dan Patlak	256,891	51.69
Democratic	Brendan F. Houlihan (incumbent)	240,070	48.31
Total votes		496,961	100

=== Metropolitan Water Reclamation District of Greater Chicago commissioner ===
2014 Metropolitan Water Reclamation District of Greater Chicago commissioner Democratic primary
Party	Candidate	Votes	%
Democratic	Cynthia M. Santos (incumbent)	117,240	18.16
Democratic	Frank Avila (incumbent)	116,164	17.99
Democratic	Timothy "Tim" Bradford	112,152	17.37
Democratic	Josina Morita	89,086	13.80
Democratic	Kathleen Mary O'Reilley	67,071	10.39
Democratic	Frank Edward Gardner	42,336	6.56
Democratic	Tom Courtney	37,468	5.80
Democratic	Brendan Francis Houlihan	33,821	5.24
Democratic	Adam Miguest	16,185	2.51
Democratic	John S. Xydakis	11,925	1.85
Write-in	Others	2,266	0.35
Total votes		645,714	100

=== Moraine Valley Community College District 524 Board of Trustees ===
2019 Moraine Valley Community College District 524 Board of Trustees election
Candidate	Votes	%
Bernadette Barrett	14,078	16.39
Joseph P. Murphy (incumbent)	13,392	15.59
Beth McElroy Kirkwood	12,223	14.23
Sandra Wagner (incumbent)	11,990	13.96
Jaclyn O'Day	11,549	13.44
Brendan F. Houlihan	10,290	11.98
Linda Ehlers	7,588	8.83
Shadin Maali	4,793	5.58
