= Michael J. Carberry =

American politician

Member of the Illinois House of Representatives from the 36th district
- In office March 14, 2010 – January 12, 2011
- Preceded by: James D. Brosnahan
- Succeeded by: Kelly M. Burke

Personal details
- Party: Democratic
- Spouse: Michelle
- Education: Western Kentucky University
- Occupation: small business owner

Michael J. Carberry is a former Democratic member of the Illinois House of Representatives, representing the 36th District from March 2010, when he was appointed to replace retiring James D. Brosnahan, until January 2011. The 36th District includes all or parts of Oak Lawn, Evergreen Park, Chicago Ridge, Hometown, Palos Hills and Chicago's 18th, 19th, and 21st Wards.

Carberry helped found CECO Inc., a contractor for the International Brotherhood of Electrical Workers Local 134.

Carberry and his wife, Michelle have three children: Mary Kate, Claire and Sean. A lifelong resident of the area, Carberry attended St. Catherine of Alexandria grade school and Brother Rice High School. He received his B.A. in journalism from Western Kentucky University and also attended Northeast Louisiana University, now known as the University of Louisiana-Monroe.

During the 96th Illinois General Assembly, incumbent James D. Brosnahan resigned effective February, 11, 2010. The 36th Representative District Committee of the Democratic Party appointed Carberry to fill the vacancy. He was sworn into office on March 14, 2010. He was not a candidate for election in the 2010 general election. He was succeeded by fellow Democrat Kelly M. Burke.
