= Kelly M. Burke =

American politician

Kelly Burke

Member of the Illinois House of Representatives from the 36th district
- In office January 12, 2011 – January 8, 2025
- Preceded by: Michael J. Carberry
- Succeeded by: Rick Ryan

Mayor of Evergreen Park
- Incumbent
- Assumed office March 17, 2022
- Preceded by: James Sexton

Personal details
- Party: Democratic
- Spouse: Terry
- Children: 3
- Education: University of Illinois (BA); John Marshall Law School (JD)

Kelly M. Burke is the current mayor of Evergreen Park, Illinois and a former Democratic member of the Illinois House of Representatives, representing the 36th District from January 2011 to January 2025. The 36th District includes all or parts of the Beverly, Mount Greenwood and Auburn-Gresham neighborhoods in the City of Chicago as well as the all or parts of the surrounding suburbs of Oak Lawn, Evergreen Park, Chicago Ridge, Hometown and Palos Hills.

Burke did not seek reelection to the Illinois House in the 2024 general election.

== Early life and career ==
Kelly M. Burke has a B.A. from the University of Illinois at Urbana-Champaign and a Juris Doctor degree from John Marshall Law School. She was a legislative aide to State Representative Andrew J. McGann while he was in office. She served on the Evergreen Park Public Library Board including a stint as its president. At the time of her election, she was a lawyer for Saint Xavier University.

== Political career ==
=== Illinois House of Representatives ===
Burke was elected in the 2010 general election to succeed appointee Michael J. Carberry. On January 12, 2023, Speaker Emanuel Chris Welch appointed Burke to serve as an Assistant Majority Leader.

As of July 3, 2022, Representative Burke is a member of the following Illinois House committees:

- Appropriations - Higher Education (HAPI)
- (Chairwoman of) Campaign Finance Subcommittee (SHEE-CFIN)
- (Chairwoman of) Election Administration & Ballot Access Subcommittee (SHEE-ELEC)
- (Chairwoman of) Ethics & Elections Committee (SHEE)
- (Chairwoman of) Government Transparency & Accountability Subcommittee (SHEE-GTAC)
- Health Care Licenses Committee (HHCL)
- (Chairwoman of) Lobbying Subcommittee (SHEE-LOBY)
- Personnel & Pensions Committee (HPPN)
- Redistricting Committee (HRED)

=== Mayor of Evergreen Park ===
In 2021, Burke was overwhelmingly elected Mayor to succeed longtime incumbent James Sexton who had declined to run for a sixth term. In her capacity as mayor, Burke is an appointee to the Cook County Land Bank Authority. She was appointed to a three year term on March 17, 2022.

=== Electoral history ===
Burke was elected to the Illinois House of Representatives in 2010, and reelected against Republican candidates in 2012 and 2022 and reelected without opposition in 2014, 2016, 2018, and 2020.

Illinois 36th State House District General Election, 2010
Party	Candidate	Votes	%
Democratic	Kelly M. Burke	21,874	71.29
Republican	Bob Shelstrom	8,799	28.68
Independent	Timothy Haines (write-in)	8	.03
Total votes		30,681	100.0

Illinois 36th State House District General Election, 2012
Party	Candidate	Votes	%
Democratic	Kelly M. Burke (incumbent)	29,910	67.87
Republican	Bob Shelstrom	14,158	32.13
Total votes		44,068	100.0

Illinois 36th State House District General Election, 2014
Party	Candidate	Votes	%
Democratic	Kelly M. Burke (incumbent)	25,443	100.0
Total votes		25,443	100.0

Illinois 36th State House District General Election, 2016
Party	Candidate	Votes	%
Democratic	Kelly M. Burke (incumbent)	38,047	100.0
Total votes		38,047	100.0

Illinois 36th State House District General Election, 2018
Party	Candidate	Votes	%
Democratic	Kelly M. Burke (incumbent)	30,339	100.0
Total votes		30,339	100.0

Illinois 36th State House District General Election, 2020
Party	Candidate	Votes	%
Democratic	Kelly M. Burke (incumbent)	39,536	100.0
Total votes		38,047	100.0

Illinois 36th State House District General Election, 2022
Party	Candidate	Votes	%
Democratic	Kelly Burke (incumbent)	21,209	61.78%
Republican	David Sheppard	13,122	38.22%
Total votes			
