= 2010 Cook County, Illinois, elections =

- November 2, 2010
- Turnout: 52.68%

The Cook County, Illinois, general election was held on November 2, 2010.

Primaries were held February 2, 2010.

Elections were held for Assessor, Clerk, Sheriff, Treasurer, President of the Cook County Board of Commissioners, all 17 seats of the Cook County Board of Commissioners, Cook County Board of Review district 1, three seats on the Water Reclamation District Board, and judgeships on the Circuit Court of Cook County.

== Election information ==
2010 was a midterm election year in the United States. The primaries and general elections for Cook County races coincided with those for federal (House and Senate) and those for state elections.

=== Voter turnout ===
Voter turnout in Cook County during the primaries was 26.41%, with 761,626 ballots cast. The city of Chicago saw 27.282% turnout and suburban Cook County saw 25.54% turnout.

The general election saw 52.68% turnout, with 1,424,959 ballots cast. The city of Chicago saw 52.88% turnout and suburban Cook County saw 52.48% turnout.

== Assessor ==
2010 Cook County Assessor election
- November 2, 2010
- Turnout: 49.88%
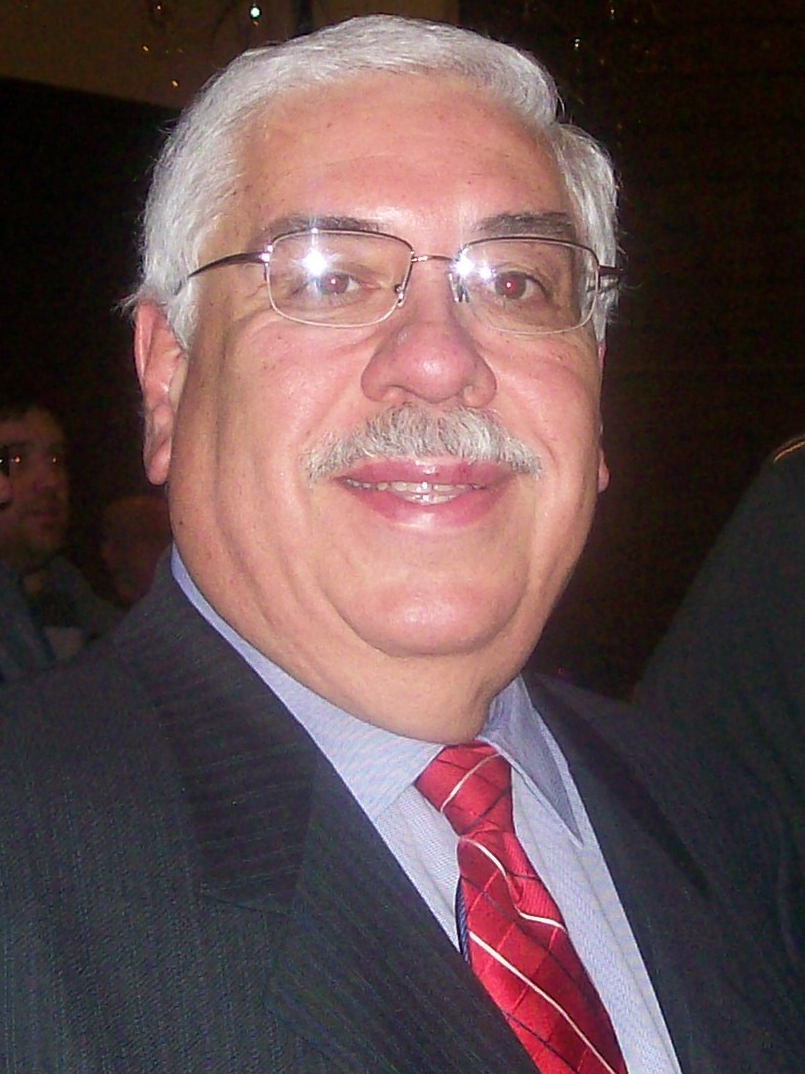

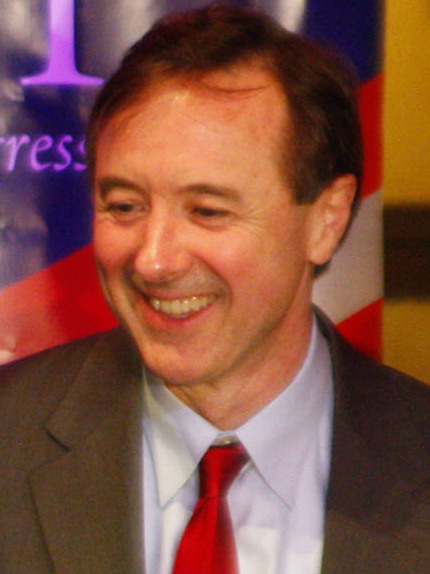

Nominee	Joseph Berrios	Forrest Claypool	Sharon Strobeck-Eckersall
Party	Democratic	Independent	Republican
Popular vote	648,053	427,842	237,955
Percentage	48.03%	31.71%	17.64%
Assessor before election
James Houlihan
Democratic
Elected Assessor
Joseph Berrios
Democratic

In the 2010 Cook County Assessor election, incumbent Assessor James Houlihan, a Democrat, first appointed in 1997 who was thrice reelected, did not seek reelection to what would have been a fourth full term. Joseph Berrios was elected to succeed him.

=== Primaries ===
==== Democratic ====
Candidates

- Joseph Berrios, member of the Cook County Board of Review
- Raymond A. Figueroa, former judge of the Cook County Circuit Court and former Chicago alderman
- Robert Shaw, former member of the Cook County Board of Review and former Chicago alderman

Additionally, Andrea Raila had been a candidate before withdrawing from the race.

Endorsements

Raymond A. Figueroa

Newspapers

- Chicago Sun-Times
- Chicago Tribune
- Daily Herald

Organizations

- Democratic Party of the 49th Ward

Politicians

- Roberto Maldonado, Chicago alderman
Robert Shaw

Newspapers

- Citizen Newspaper Group

Results

Cook County Assessor Democratic primary
Party	Candidate	Votes	%
Democratic	Joseph Berrios	203,397	39.14
Democratic	Robert Shaw	177,155	34.09
Democratic	Raymond A. Figueroa	139,164	26.78
Total votes		519,716	100

==== Republican ====
Evanston Township assessor Sharon Strobeck-Eckersall won the Republican primary.

Cook County Assessor Republican primary
Party	Candidate	Votes	%
Republican	Sharon Strobeck-Eckersall	120,889	100
Total votes		120,889	100

==== Green ====
Cook County Assessor Green primary
Party	Candidate	Votes	%
Green	Robert C. Grota	2,098	100
Total votes		2,098	100

=== General election ===
Cook County Assessor election
Party	Candidate	Votes	%
Democratic	Joseph Berrios	648,053	48.03
Independent	Forrest Claypool	427,842	31.71
Republican	Sharon Strobeck-Eckersall	237,955	17.64
Green	Robert C. Grota	35,378	2.62
Total votes		1,349,228	100

== Clerk ==
2010 Cook County Clerk election
- November 2, 2010
- Turnout: 49.79%
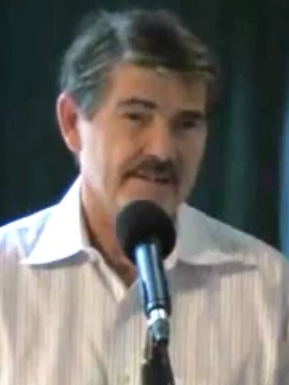

Candidate	David Orr	Angel Garcia
Party	Democratic	Republican
Popular vote	1,047,462	299,449
Percentage	77.77%	22.23%
Clerk before election
David Orr
Democratic
Elected Clerk
David Orr
Democratic

In the 2010 Cook County Clerk election, incumbent fifth-term Clerk David Orr, a Democrat, was reelected.

=== Primaries ===
==== Democratic ====
Cook County Clerk Democratic primary
Party	Candidate	Votes	%
Democratic	David D. Orr (incumbent)	502,817	100
Total votes		502,817	100

==== Republican ====
Cook County Clerk Republican primary
Party	Candidate	Votes	%
Republican	Angel Garcia	122,570	100
Total votes		122,570	100

==== Green ====
No candidates, ballot-certified or formal write-in, ran in the Green primary.

=== General election ===
Cook County Clerk election
Party	Candidate	Votes	%
Democratic	David D. Orr (incumbent)	1,047,462	77.77
Republican	Angel Garcia	299,449	22.23
Total votes		1,346,911	100

== Sheriff ==
2010 Cook County Sheriff election
- November 2, 2010
- Turnout: 49.85%

Candidate	Tom Dart	Frederick Collins
Party	Democratic	Republican
Popular vote	1,041,696	257,682
Percentage	77.26%	19.11%
Sheriff before election
Tom Dart
Democratic
Elected Sheriff
Tom Dart
Democratic

In the 2010 Cook County Sheriff election, incumbent first-term Sheriff Tom Dart, a Democrat, was reelected.

=== Primaries ===
==== Democratic ====
Cook County Sheriff Democratic primary
Party	Candidate	Votes	%
Democratic	Thomas J. Dart (incumbent)	397,844	76.37
Democratic	Sylvester E. Baker Jr.	123,096	23.63
Total votes		520,940	100

==== Republican ====
Cook County Sheriff Republican primary
Party	Candidate	Votes	%
Republican	Frederick Collins	124,228	100
Total votes		124,228	100

==== Green ====
Cook County Sheriff Green primary
Party	Candidate	Votes	%
Green	Marshall P. Lewis	2,104	100
Total votes		2,104	100

=== General election ===
Cook County Sheriff election
Party	Candidate	Votes	%
Democratic	Thomas J. Dart (incumbent)	1,041,696	77.26
Republican	Frederick Collins	257,682	19.11
Green	Marshall P. Lewis	48,930	3.63
Total votes		1,348,308	100

== Treasurer ==
2010 Cook County Treasurer election
- November 2, 2010
- Turnout: 49.91%
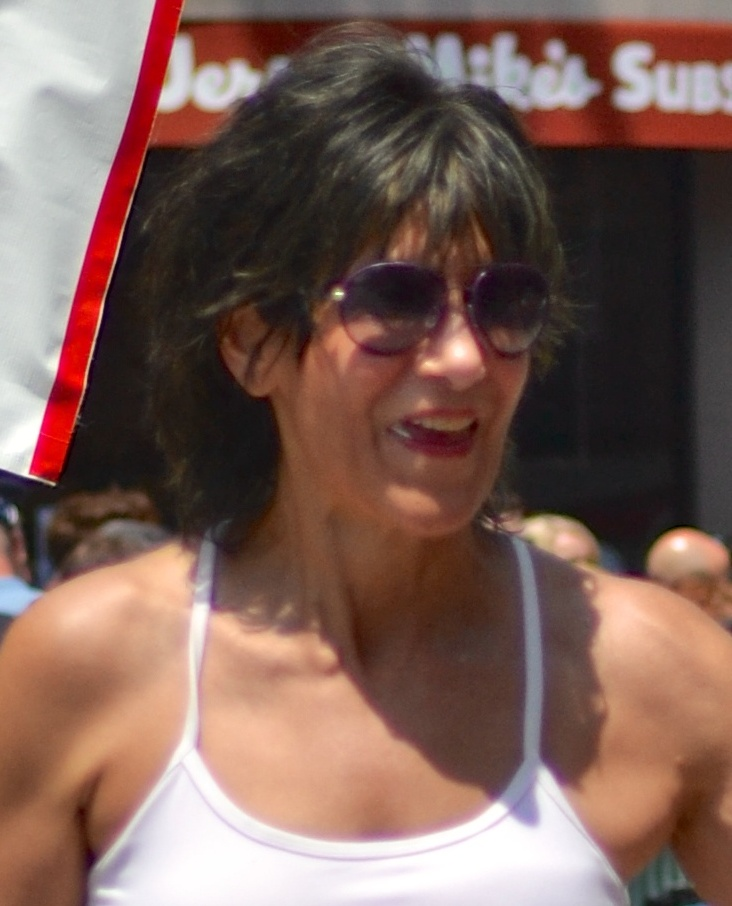

Candidate	Maria Pappas	Carol A. Morse
Party	Democratic	Republican
Popular vote	1,042,318	307,612
Percentage	77.21%	22.79%
Treasurer before election
Maria Pappas
Democratic
Elected Treasurer
Maria Pappas
Democratic

In the 2010 Cook County Treasurer election, incumbent third-term Treasurer Maria Pappas, a Democrat, was reelected.

=== Primaries ===
==== Democratic ====
Cook County Treasurer Democratic primary
Party	Candidate	Votes	%
Democratic	Maria Pappas (incumbent)	493,724	100
Total votes		493,724	100

==== Republican ====
Cook County Treasurer Republican primary
Party	Candidate	Votes	%
Republican	Carol A. Morse	123,408	100
Total votes		123,408	100

==== Green ====
No candidates, ballot-certified or formal write-in, ran in the Green primary.

=== General election ===
Cook County Treasurer election
Party	Candidate	Votes	%
Democratic	Maria Pappas (incumbent)	1,042,318	77.21
Republican	Carol A. Morse	307,612	22.79
Total votes		1,349,930	100

== President of the Cook County Board of Commissioners ==
2010 President of the Cook County Board of Commissioners election
- November 2, 2010
- Turnout: 49.92%
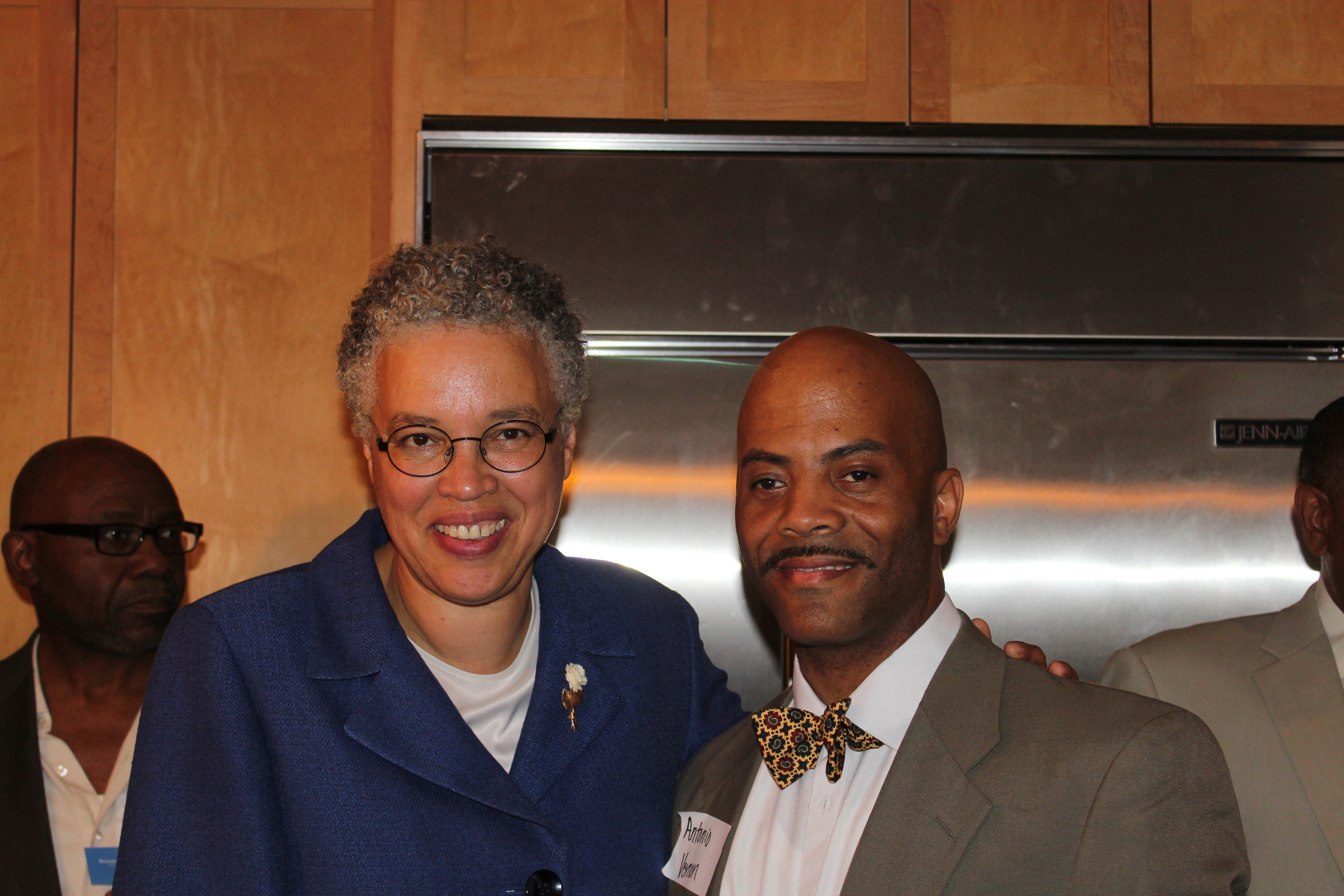

Nominee	Toni Preckwinkle	Roger A. Keats
Party	Democratic	Republican
Popular vote	939,056	357,070
Percentage	69.54%	26.44
President before election
Todd Stroger
Democratic
Elected President
Toni Preckwinkle
Democratic

In the 2010 President of the Cook County Board of Commissioners election, incumbent President Todd Stroger, a Democrat appointed in 2006 and elected outright to a full term later that year, lost reelection, being unseated in the Democratic primary by Toni Preckwinkle, who went on to win the general election.

Her victory in this election would make Preckwinkle the first woman to be popularly elected to the office of president of the Cook County Board of Commissioners, and the second woman overall to hold the position after Bobbie L. Steele.

=== Primaries ===
==== Democratic ====
Candidates

- Dorothy Brown, Clerk of the Cook County Circuit Court
- Terrence J. O'Brien, Metropolitan Water Reclamation District of Greater Chicago President
- Toni Preckwinkle, Chicago alderman
- Todd Stroger, incumbent President of the Cook County Board of Commissioners

Withdrew

- Danny K. Davis, U.S. congressman, former member of the Cook County Board of Commissioners, former member of the Chicago City Council

Polls

Poll source	Date(s) administered	Sample size	Margin of error	Dorothy Brown	Forrest Claypool	Terrence J. O'Brien	Toni Preckwinkle	Todd Stroger	Other	Undecided
WGN-TV/Chicago Tribune	January 16–20, 2010	503	± 4.4%	24%	–	16%	36%	11%	–	12%
WGN-TV/Chicago Tribune	December 2–8, 2009	502	± 4.4%	29%	–	11%	20%	14%	2%	11%
Cooper & Secrest Associates	November 11–17, 2009	605	± 4.0%	29%	—	15%	16%	13%	—	27%
Fako & Associates for Supporters of Cook County Circuit Court Clerk Dorothy Brown	April 21–22, 2009	295	± 5.70%	21%	33%	—	10%	7%	—	
Bennett, Petts, & Normington for SEIU	March 23—25 2009		± 4.3	–	28%	–	18%	23%	–	36%

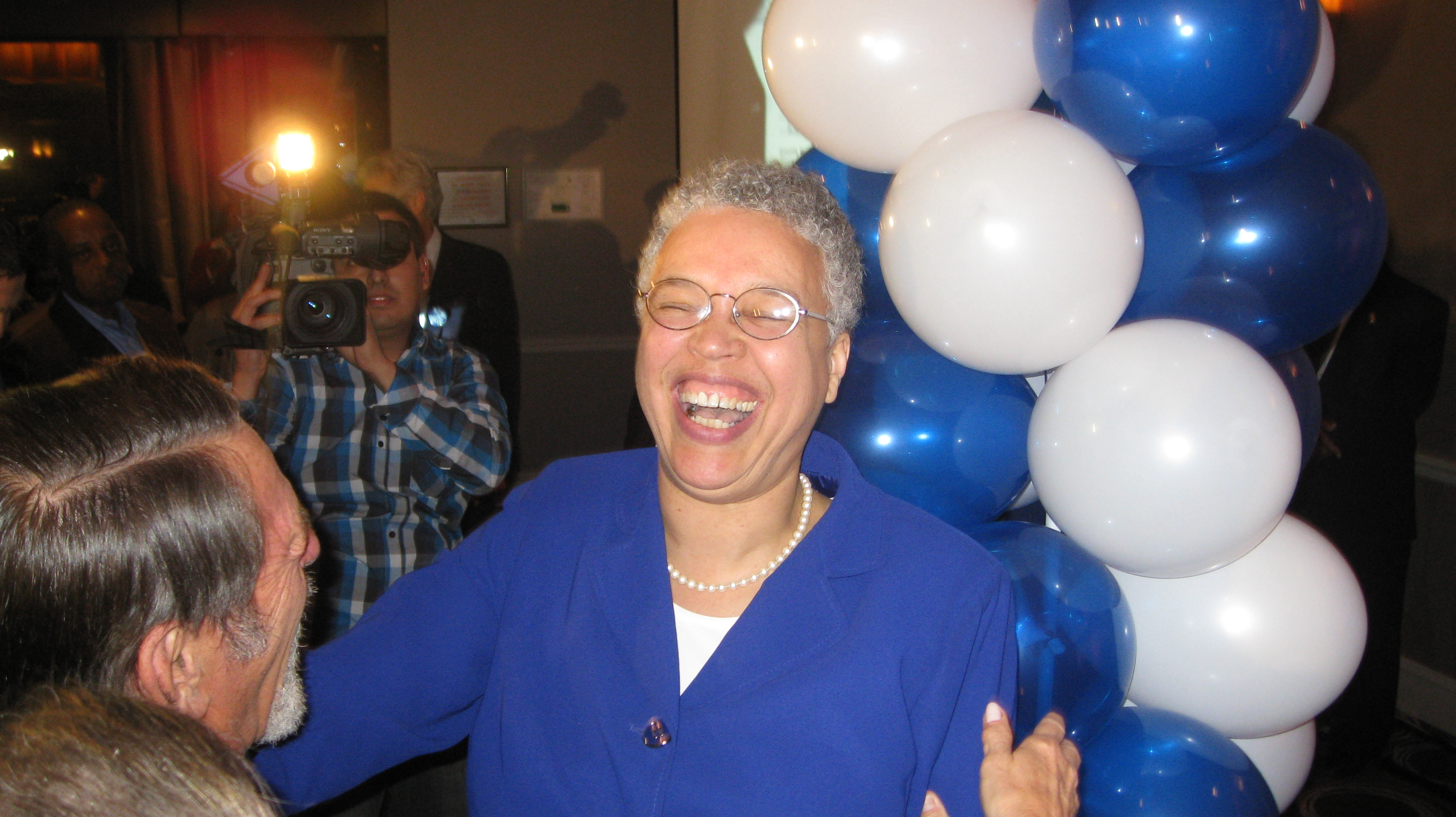
Toni Preckwinkle celebrating her Democratic primary victory

Results

President of the Cook County Board of Commissioners Democratic primary
Party	Candidate	Votes	%
Democratic	Toni Preckwinkle	281,905	48.99
Democratic	Terrence J. O'Brien	131,896	22.92
Democratic	Dorothy A. Brown	83,150	14.45
Democratic	Todd H. Stroger (incumbent)	78,532	13.65
Total votes		575,483	100

==== Republican ====
Candidates

- John Garrido III, Chicago Police Department officer
- Roger A. Keats, former Illinois State Senator and former Illinois State Representative

Results

President of the Cook County Board of Commissioners Republican primary
Party	Candidate	Votes	%
Republican	Roger A. Keats	94,398	68.71
Republican	John Garrido III	42,986	31.29
Total votes		575,483	100

==== Green ====
Candidates

- Thomas Tresser, activist

Results

President of the Cook County Board of Commissioners Green primary
Party	Candidate	Votes	%
Green	Thomas Tresser	2,001	100
Total votes		2,001	100

=== General election ===
President of the Cook County Board of Commissioners election
Party	Candidate	Votes	%
Democratic	Toni Preckwinkle	939,056	69.54
Republican	Roger A. Keats	357,070	26.44
Green	Thomas Tresser	54,273	4.02
Total votes		1,350,399	100

== Cook County Board of Commissioners ==
2010 Cook County Board of Commissioners election
- November 2, 2010

All 17 seats on the Cook County Board of Commissioners 9 seats needed for a majority
	First party	Second party
Party	Democratic	Republican
Seats before	12	5
Seats won	13	4
Seat change	▲1	▼1
Popular vote	875,019	356,573
Percentage	67.30%	27.42%
Swing	▼9.15%	▲4.53%
	Third party
Party	Green
Seats before	0
Seats won	0
Seat change	Steady
Popular vote	68,644
Percentage	5.28%
Swing	▲4.62%

The 2010 Cook County Board of Commissioners election saw all seventeen seats of the Cook County Board of Commissioners up for election to four-year terms.

== Cook County Board of Review ==
2010 Cook County Board of Review election
- November 2, 2010

1 of 3 seats on the Cook County Board of Review 2 seats needed for a majority
	First party	Second party
Party	Democratic	Republican
Seats before	3	0
Seats after	2	1
Seat change	▼1	▲1
Seats up	1	0
Races won	0	1

In the 2010 Cook County Board of Review election, one seat, Democratic-held, out of its three seats was up for election.

The Cook County Board of Review has its three seats rotate the length of terms. In a staggered fashion (in which no two seats have coinciding two-year terms), the seats rotate between two consecutive four-year terms and a two-year term.

=== 1st district ===
Incumbent first-term member Brendan Houlihan, a Democrat who had been elected in 2006, lost reelection to Republican Dan Patlak. This election was to a two-year term.

==== Primaries ====
===== Democratic =====
Cook County Board of Review 1st district Democratic primary
Party	Candidate	Votes	%
Democratic	Brendan F. Houlihan (incumbent)	109,750	100
Total votes		109,750	100

===== Republican =====
Cook County Board of Review 1st district Republican primary
Party	Candidate	Votes	%
Republican	Dan Patlak	48,218	52.51
Republican	Sean M. Morrison	43,600	47.49
Total votes		91,818	100

===== Green =====
No candidates, ballot-certified or formal write-in, ran in the Green primary.

==== General election ====
Cook County Board of Review 1st district election
Party	Candidate	Votes	%
Republican	Dan Patlak	256,891	51.69
Democratic	Brendan F. Houlihan (incumbent)	240,070	48.31
Total votes		496,961	100

== Water Reclamation District Board ==
2010 Metropolitan Water Reclamation District of Greater Chicago election
- November 2, 2010

3 of 9 seats on the Metropolitan Water Reclamation District of Greater Chicago 5 seats needed for a majority
	First party	Second party	Third party
Party	Democratic	Republican	Green
Seats before	9	0	0
Seats after	9	0	0
Seat change	Steady	Steady	Steady
Popular vote	2,007,447	608,336	324,078
Percentage	68.28%	20.69%	11.02%
Swing	▼0.03%	▼2.12%	▲2.14%
Seats up	3	0	0
Races won	3	0	0

In the 2010 Metropolitan Water Reclamation District of Greater Chicago election, three of the nine seats on the Metropolitan Water Reclamation District of Greater Chicago board were up for election in an at-large race. Since three six-year seats were up for election, voters could vote for up to three candidates and the top-three finishers would win.

Two of the incumbents for the three seats were seeking reelection, Democrats Barbara McGowan and Mariyana Spyropoulos. Each won reelection, joined by fellow Democrat Michael A. Alvarez in winning election.

=== Primaries ===
==== Democratic ====
Water Reclamation District Board election Democratic primary
Party	Candidate	Votes	%
Democratic	Mariyana T. Spyropoulos (incumbent)	180,730	14.78
Democratic	Barbara McGowan (incumbent)	179,955	14.72
Democratic	Michael A. Alvarez	158,172	12.94
Democratic	Kari K. Steele	141,649	11.59
Democratic	Todd Connor	130,383	10.66
Democratic	Maureen Kelly	123,590	10.11
Democratic	Kathleen Mary O'Reilley	110,810	9.06
Democratic	Wallace Davis, III	98,694	8.07
Democratic	Stella B. Black	98,588	8.06
Total votes		1,222,571	100

==== Republican ====
Water Reclamation District Board election Republican primary
Party	Candidate	Votes	%
Republican	Paul Chialdikas	101,817	61.44
Republican	Jimmy Lee Tillman II	63,914	38.56
Total votes		165,731	100

==== Green ====
Water Reclamation District Board election Green primary
Party	Candidate	Votes	%
Green	Diana Horton	1,611	37.08
Green	John "Jack" Ailey	1,393	32.06
Green	Nadine Bopp	1,341	30.86
Total votes		4,345	100

=== General election ===
Water Reclamation District Board election
Party	Candidate	Votes	%
Democratic	Michael A. Alvarez	679,058	23.10
Democratic	Mariyana T. Spyropoulos (incumbent)	669,036	22.76
Democratic	Barbara McGowan (incumbent)	659,353	22.43
Republican	Paul Chialdikas	380,787	12.95
Republican	Jimmy Lee Tillman II	227,549	7.74
Green	Diana Horton	141,943	4.83
Green	John "Jack" Ailey	93,301	3.17
Green	Nadine Bopp	88,834	3.02
Total votes		2,939,861	100

== Judicial elections ==
8 judgeships on the Circuit Court of Cook County were up for partisan elections due to vacancies. Other judgeships had retention elections.

13 subcircuit courts judgeships were also up for partisan elections due to vacancies. Other judgeships had retention elections.

== Other elections ==
Coinciding with the primaries, elections were held to elect the Democratic, Republican, and Green committeemen for the suburban townships.

== See also ==
- 2010 Illinois elections
