= 2002 Cook County, Illinois, elections =

American election

- November 5, 2002
- Turnout: 52.12%

The Cook County, Illinois, general election was held on November 5, 2002.

Primaries were held on March 19, 2002.

Elections were held for Assessor, Clerk, Sheriff, Treasurer, President of the Cook County Board of Commissioners, all 17 seats of the Cook County Board of Commissioners, all 3 seats of the Cook County Board of Review, three seats on the Water Reclamation District Board, and judgeships on the Circuit Court of Cook County.

== Election information ==
2002 was a midterm election year in the United States. The primaries and general elections for Cook County races coincided with those for federal (Senate and House) and those for state elections.

=== Voter turnout ===
==== Primary election ====
Voter turnout in Cook County during the primaries was 36.69%. The city of Chicago saw 39.87% turnout and suburban Cook County saw 33.40% turnout.

Vote totals of primaries
Primary	Chicago vote totals	Suburban Cook County vote totals	Total Cook County vote totals
Democratic	512,369	279,236	713,040
Republican	34,272	154,974	189,244
Libertarian	102	15	117
Nonpartisan			
Total	548,832	438,846	987,678

==== General election ====
The general election saw 52.12% turnout, with 1,423,403 ballots cast. Chicago saw 53.16% turnout and suburban Cook County saw 51.09% turnout.

== Assessor ==
2002 Cook County Assessor election
- November 5, 2002
- Turnout: 46.14%

Nominee	James Houlihan	James P. Pieczonka
Party	Democratic	Republican
Popular vote	954,774	305,176
Percentage	75.78%	24.22%
Assessor before election
James Houlihan
Democratic
Elected Assessor
James Houlihan
Democratic

In the 2002 Cook County Assessor election, incumbent Assessor James Houlihan, a Democrat first appointed in 1997 who was reelected in 1998, was again reelected.

=== Primaries ===
==== Democratic ====
Cook County Assessor Democratic primary
Party	Candidate	Votes	%
Democratic	James Houlihan (incumbent)	534,407	100
Total votes		534,407	100

==== Republican ====
Cook County Assessor Republican primary
Party	Candidate	Votes	%
Republican	James P. Pieczonka	135,397	100
Total votes		135,397	100

=== General election ===
Cook County Assessor election
Party	Candidate	Votes	%
Democratic	James Houlihan (incumbent)	954,774	75.78
Republican	James P. Pieczonka	305,176	24.22
Total votes		1,259,950	100

== Clerk ==
2002 Cook County Clerk election
- November 5, 2002
- Turnout: 47.75%
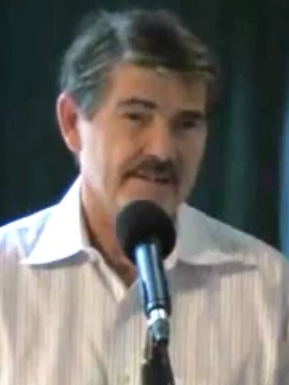

Candidate	David Orr	Kathleen A. Thomas
Party	Democratic	Republican
Popular vote	992,441	311,552
Percentage	76.11%	23.89%
Clerk before election
David Orr
Democratic
Elected Clerk
David Orr
Democratic

In the 2002 Cook County Clerk election, incumbent third-term Clerk David Orr, a Democrat, was reelected.

=== Primaries ===
==== Democratic ====
Cook County Clerk Democratic primary
Party	Candidate	Votes	%
Democratic	David D. Orr (incumbent)	603,556	100
Total votes		603,556	100

==== Republican ====
Cook County Clerk Republican primary
Party	Candidate	Votes	%
Republican	Kathleen A. Thomas	139,512	100
Total votes		139,512	100

=== General election ===
Cook County Clerk election
Party	Candidate	Votes	%
Democratic	David D. Orr (incumbent)	992,441	76.11
Republican	Kathleen A. Thomas	311,552	23.89
Total votes		1,303,993	100

== Sheriff ==
2002 Cook County Sheriff election
- November 5, 2002
- Turnout: 46.89%
Candidate	Michael F. Sheahan	Ronald Swick
Party	Democratic	Republican
Popular vote	984,348	296,062
Percentage	76.88%	23.12%
Sheriff before election
Michael F. Sheahan
Democratic
Elected Sheriff
Michael F. Sheahan
Democratic

In the 2002 Cook County Sheriff election, incumbent third-term Sheriff Michael F. Sheahan, a Democrat, was reelected.

=== Primaries ===
==== Democratic ====
Cook County Sheriff Democratic primary
Party	Candidate	Votes	%
Democratic	Michael F. Sheahan (incumbent)	558,682	100
Total votes		558,682	100

==== Republican ====
Cook County Sheriff Republican primary
Party	Candidate	Votes	%
Republican	Ronald Swick	135,355	100
Total votes		135,355	100

=== General election ===
Cook County Sheriff election
Party	Candidate	Votes	%
Democratic	Michael F. Sheahan (incumbent)	984,348	76.88
Republican	Ronald Swick	296,062	23.12
Total votes		1,280,410	100

== Treasurer ==
2002 Cook County Treasurer election
- November 5, 2002
- Turnout: 47.98%
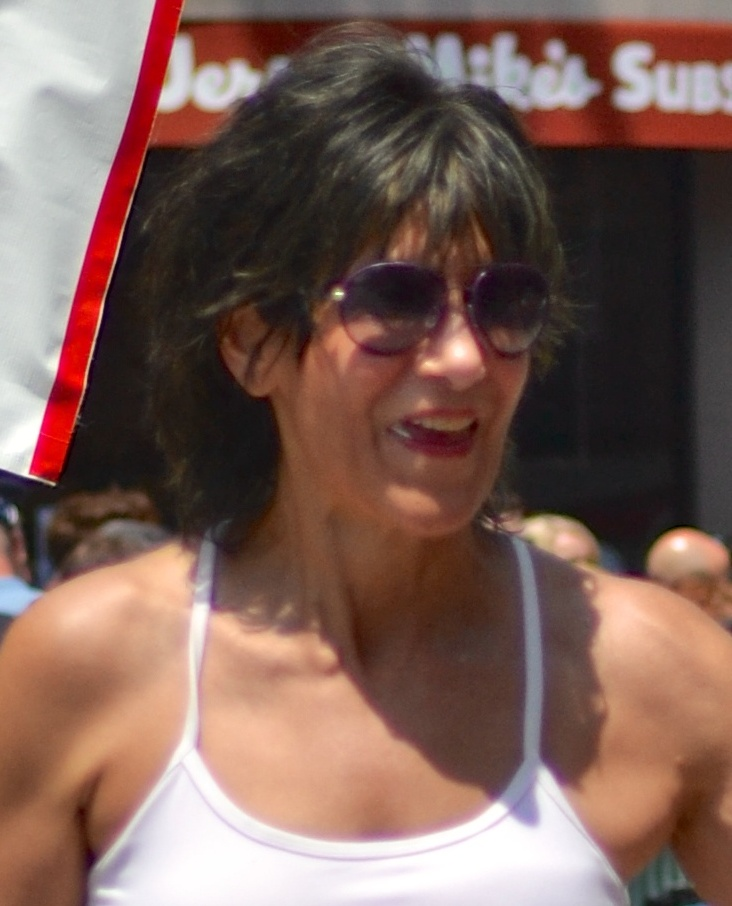

Candidate	Maria Pappas	Richard J. Daniels
Party	Democratic	Republican
Popular vote	998,480	311,787
Percentage	76.20%	23.80%
Treasurer before election
Maria Pappas
Democratic
Elected Treasurer
Maria Pappas
Democratic

In the 2002 Cook County Treasurer election, incumbent first-term Treasurer Maria Pappas, a Democrat, was reelected.

=== Primaries ===
==== Democratic ====
Cook County Treasurer Democratic primary
Party	Candidate	Votes	%
Democratic	Maria Pappas (incumbent)	586,494	100
Total votes		586,494	100

==== Republican ====
Cook County Treasurer Republican primary
Party	Candidate	Votes	%
Republican	Richard J. Daniels	137,151	100
Total votes		137,151	100

=== General election ===
Cook County Treasurer election
Party	Candidate	Votes	%
Democratic	Maria Pappas (incumbent)	998,480	76.20
Republican	Richard J. Daniels	311,787	23.80
Total votes		1,310,267	100

== President of the Cook County Board of Commissioners ==
2002 President of the Cook County Board of Commissioners election
- November 5, 2002
- Turnout: 48.04%
Nominee	John Stroger	Christopher A. Bullock
Party	Democratic	Republican
Popular vote	901,679	410,155
Percentage	68.73%	31.27
President before election
John Stroger
Democratic
Elected President
John Stroger
Democratic

In the 2002 President of the Cook County Board of Commissioners election, incumbent second-term President John Stroger, a Democrat, was reelected.

Stroger was only the forth person ever to win three elections for president of the Cook County Board of Commissioners.

=== Primaries ===
==== Democratic ====
President of the Cook County Board of Commissioners Democratic primary
Party	Candidate	Votes	%
Democratic	John H. Stroger, Jr. (incumbent)	587,440	100
Total votes		587,440	100

==== Republican ====
President of the Cook County Board of Commissioners Republican primary
Party	Candidate	Votes	%
Republican	Christopher A. Bullock	135,786	100
Total votes		135,786	100

=== General election ===
President of the Cook County Board of Commissioners election
Party	Candidate	Votes	%
Democratic	John H. Stroger, Jr. (incumbent)	901,679	68.73
Republican	Christopher A. Bullock	410,155	31.27
Total votes		1,311,834	100

== Cook County Board of Commissioners ==
2002 Cook County Board of Commissioners election
- November 5, 2002

All 17 seats on the Cook County Board of Commissioners 9 seats needed for a majority
	First party	Second party
Party	Democratic	Republican
Seats before	12	5
Seats won	12	5
Seat change	Steady	Steady
Popular vote	877,738	299,652
Percentage	74.55%	25.45%
Swing	▲4.16%	▼4.16%

The 2002 Cook County Board of Commissioners election saw all seventeen seats of the Cook County Board of Commissioners up for election to four-year terms.

As these were the first elections held following the 2000 United States census, the seats faced redistricting before this election.

== Cook County Board of Review ==
2002 Cook County Board of Review election
- November 5, 2002

3 of 3 seats on the Cook County Board of Review 2 seats needed for a majority
	First party	Second party
Party	Democratic	Republican
Seats before	2	1
Seats after	2	1
Seat change	Steady	Steady
Seats up	2	1
Races won	2	1

In the 2002 Cook County Board of Review election, all three seats, two Democratic-held and one Republican-held, were up for election.

Beginning with the 2002 elections, the Cook County Board of Review has had its three seats rotate the length of terms. In a staggered fashion (in which no two seats have coinciding two-year terms), the seats rotate between two consecutive four-year terms and a two-year term.

As this was the first elections held following the 2000 United States census, the seats faced redistricting before this election.

=== 1st district ===
Incumbent first-term member Maureen Murphy, a Republican, was reelected, being unopposed in both the Republican primary and general election. This election was to a four-year term.

==== Primaries ====
===== Democratic =====
No candidates, ballot-certified or formal write-in, ran in the Democratic primary. The Democratic Party ultimately nominated Brendan F. Houlihan.

===== Republican =====
Cook County Board of Review 1st district Republican primary
Party	Candidate	Votes	%
Republican	Maureen Murphy (incumbent)	102,690	100
Total votes		102,690	100

==== General election ====
Cook County Board of Review 1st district election
Party	Candidate	Votes	%
Republican	Maureen Murphy (incumbent)	381,157	100
Total votes		381,157	100

=== 2nd district ===
Incumbent first-term member Joseph Berrios, a Democrat, was reelected, running unopposed in both the Democratic primary and the general election. Berrios had not only served since the Board of Review was constituted in 1998, but had also served on its predecessor organization, the Cook County Board of (Tax) Appeals, for ten years. This election was to a four-year term.

==== Primaries ====
===== Democratic =====
Cook County Board of Review 2nd district Democratic primary
Party	Candidate	Votes	%
Democratic	Joseph Berrios (incumbent)	86,160	100
Total votes		86,160	100

===== Republican =====
No candidates, ballot-certified or formal write-in, ran in the Republican primary.

==== General election ====
Cook County Board of Review 2nd district election
Party	Candidate	Votes	%
Democratic	Joseph Berrios (incumbent)	303,159	100
Total votes		303,159	100

=== 3rd district ===
Incumbent first-term member Robert Shaw, a Democrat, was reelected. This election was to a two-year term.

==== Primaries ====
===== Democratic =====
Cook County Board of Review 3rd district Democratic primary
Party	Candidate	Votes	%
Democratic	Robert Shaw (incumbent)	143,317	51.71
Democratic	Steven Burris	133,854	48.29
Total votes		277,171	100

===== Republican =====
No candidates, ballot-certified or formal write-in, ran in the Republican primary.

==== General election ====
Cook County Board of Review 3rd district election
Party	Candidate	Votes	%
Democratic	Robert Shaw (incumbent)	374,527	100
Total votes		374,527	100

== Water Reclamation District Board ==
2002 Metropolitan Water Reclamation District of Greater Chicago election
- November 5, 2002

3 of 9 seats on the Metropolitan Water Reclamation District of Greater Chicago 5 seats needed for a majority
	First party	Second party
Party	Democratic	Republican
Seats before	9	0
Seats after	9	0
Seat change	Steady	Steady
Popular vote	2,222,243	1,005,503
Percentage	68.85%	31.15%
Seats up	3	0
Races won	3	0

In the 2006 Metropolitan Water Reclamation District of Greater Chicago election, three of the nine seats on the Metropolitan Water Reclamation District of Greater Chicago board were up for election in an at-large race. Since three six-year seats were up for election, voters could vote for up to three candidates and the top-three finishers would win.

Two Democratic incumbents Kathy Meany and Cynthia Santos, won reelection. They were joined in being elected by fellow Democrat Frank Avila. One Democratic incumbent, Martin Sandoval, had withdrawn ahead of the Democratic primary.

=== Primaries ===
==== Democratic ====
Water Reclamation District Board election Democratic primary
Party	Candidate	Votes	%
Democratic	Kathleen Therese Meany (incumbent)	304,767	19.97
Democratic	Cynthia M. Santos (incumbent)	300,142	19.67
Democratic	Frank Avila	194,061	12.72
Democratic	James P. Sheehan	191,456	12.54
Democratic	Jesse J. Evans	185,684	12.17
Democratic	Derrick David Stinson	120,318	7.88
Democratic	Lewis W. Powell, III	94,963	6.22
Democratic	Edward J. Schmit III	86,357	5.66
Democratic	Turheran "TC" Crawford	48,470	3.18
Total votes		1,526,218	100

==== Republican ====
Water Reclamation District Board election Republican primary
Party	Candidate	Votes	%
Republican	Donald G. Hansen	110,253	35.18
Republican	Patricia Vazquez	105,953	33.81
Republican	Eric M. Nickerson	97,197	31.01
Total votes		313,403	100

=== General election ===
Water Reclamation District Board election
Party	Candidate	Votes	%
Democratic	Kathleen Therese Meany (incumbent)	773,358	23.96
Democratic	Cynthia M. Stantos (incumbent)	758,842	23.51
Democratic	Frank Avila	690,043	21.38
Republican	Donald G. Hansen	383,823	11.89
Republican	Patricia Vazquez	330,607	10.24
Republican	Erick M. Nickerson	291,073	9.02
Total votes		3,227,746	100

== Judicial elections ==
Partisan elections were held for judgeships on the Circuit Court of Cook County, due to vacancies. Other judgeships had retention elections.

Partisan elections were also held for subcircuit courts judgeships due to vacancies. Other judgeships had retention elections.

== Other elections ==
Coinciding with the primaries, elections were held to elect both the Democratic and Republican committeemen for the suburban townships.

== See also ==
- 2002 Illinois elections
