= James D. Brosnahan =

American politician

Member of the Illinois House of Representatives from the 36th district
- In office January 8, 1997 - February 11, 2010
- Preceded by: Maureen Murphy
- Succeeded by: Michael J. Carberry

Personal details
- Born: July 5, 1963 (age 63) Evergreen Park, Illinois
- Party: Democratic
- Spouse: Janet
- Children: Tierney, Jimmy, Quinn, Julia
- Profession: Attorney

James D. Brosnahan (born 1963) is a former Democratic member of the Illinois House of Representatives, representing the 36th District from 1997 to 2010. The district includes all or parts of Oak Lawn, Evergreen Park, Chicago Ridge, Hometown, Palos Hills, and Chicago's 18th, 19th, and 21st wards.

James D. Brosnahan was born July 5, 1962, in Evergreen Park, Illinois. An attorney, he earned his B.A. at Loyola University of Chicago and his J.D., Loyola University of Chicago Law School

In the 1996 general election, Brosnahan, of Evergreen Park, defeated Republican incumbent Maureen Murphy to represent the 36th district as part of a Democratic wave in the south suburbs that flipped partisan control of the Illinois House of Representatives.

During the 96th Illinois General Assembly, Brosnahan resigned effective February 11, 2010. The 36th Representative District Committee of the Democratic Party appointed Michael J. Carberry to fill the vacancy. Carberry was sworn into office on March 14, 2010.
