= Cook County Board of Review =

Government agency in Illinois

- Seal of Cook County

Property tax appeals board overview
- Formed: 1998
- Preceding Property tax appeals board: Cook County Board of Appeals (1939–1998)
- Jurisdiction: Cook County, Illinois, United States
- Headquarters: Chicago, Illinois
- Property tax appeals board executives: George A. Cardenas, Commissioner, 1st District; Samantha Steele, Commissioner, 2nd District; Larry Rogers Jr., Commissioner, 3rd District
- Key document: 35 ILCS 200/5-5
- Website: cookcountyboardofreview.com

The Cook County Board of Review is a state independent office created by statute by the Illinois General Assembly and is governed by three commissioners who are elected by district for two- or four-year terms. Cook County, which includes Chicago, is the United States' second-most populous county (after Los Angeles County, California) with a population of 5.2 million residents. The Cook County Board of Review holds quasi-judicial powers to adjudicate taxpayer complaints or recommend exempt status of real property.

== History ==
The board had been first created after the task of hearing tax appeals was transferred from the Cook County Board of Commissioners to a three-member board of review. The Revenue Act of 1939 converted this appeals system into a two-member Cook County Board of Appeals. Both members were elected in a single at-large election held quadrennially. It remained this way until 1998. In 1996, the Illinois Legislature successfully passed Public Act 89-671, which made it so that, in 1998, the Cook County Board of Appeals would be renamed Cook County Board of Review and be reconstituted as a three-member body.

== Responsibilities ==
The board of review allows residential and commercial property owners to contest an assessment made by the Cook County assessor that they believe incorrect or unjust. The Cook County Board of Review is vested with quasi-judicial powers to adjudicate taxpayer complaints or recommend exempt status of real property, which includes: residential, commercial, industrial, condominium property, and vacant land. There are approximately 1.8 million parcels of property in Cook County. The Board of Review adjudicated 422,713 parcel appeals in the 2012 assessment year.

== Elections ==
=== 1939–1994 ===
After the Revenue Act of 1939 recreated the appeals board as the two-member Cook County Board of Appeals, its two members were elected in a single at-large election held quadrennially.

Regularly scheduled elections included:

- 1946
- 1986
- 1990
- 1994

Special elections included:

- 1988

=== Since 1998 ===
Since 1998 (when the board was recreated as a three-member body), members have been elected by district.

The Cook County Board of Review has its three seats rotate the length of terms. In a staggered fashion (in which no two seats have coinciding two-year terms), the seats rotate between two consecutive four-year terms and a two-year term.

The following table indicates whether a seat was/will be up for election in a given year:

Seats up for election by year (through 2036)
Year	District		
Year	1st	2nd	3rd
1998	Election	Election	Election
2002	Election	Election	Election
2004	No election	No election	Election
2006	Election	Election	No election
2008	No election	Election	Election
2010	Election	No election	No election
2012	Election	Election	Election
2014	No election	No election	Election
2016	Election	Election	No election
2018	No election	Election	Election
2020	Election	No election	No election
2022	Election	Election	Election
2024	No election	No election	Election
2026	Election	Election	No election
2028	No election	Election	Election
2030	Election	No election	No election
2032	Election	Election	Election
2034	No election	No election	Election
2036	Election	Election	No election

== Composition ==
Affiliation	Members
Democratic Party	3
Republican Party	0
Total	3

== Commissioners ==
=== Current ===
This is a list of the Cook County Board of Review Commissioners in order by district. This list is current as of December 2022:

District	Commissioner	In office since	Party
1	George A. Cardenas	2022	Democratic
2	Samantha Steele	2022	Democratic
3	Larry Rogers, Jr.	2004	Democratic

=== Past iterations ===
Individuals who served on the original three-member Cook County Board of Review included Patrick Nash.

Individuals who served on the two-member Cook County Board of Appeals included Joseph Berrios, Wilson Frost, Pat Quinn, and Harry H. Semrow.

=== Members of the Cook County Board of Review (1998–present) ===
First district

- Maureen Murphy (Republican): December 1998 – December 2006
- Brendan Houlihan (Democrat): December 2006 – December 2010
- Dan Patlak (Republican): December 2010 – December 2020
- Tammy Wendt (Democrat): December 2020 – December 2022
- George Cardenas (Democrat): December 2022 – present

Second district

- Joseph Berrios (Democrat): December 1998 — December 2010
- Michael Cabonargi (Democrat): February 2011 – December 2022
- Samantha Steele (Democrat): December 2022 – present

Third district

- Robert Shaw (Democrat): December 1998 – December 2004
- Larry Rogers Jr. (Democrat): December 2004 – present

== See also ==
- Cook County Board of Commissioners
- Chicago City Council
