= Maureen Murphy (politician) =

American politician

Member of the Cook County Board of Review from the 1st district
- In office December 1998 – December 2006
- Preceded by: Position created
- Succeeded by: Brendan F. Houlihan

Chair of the Cook County Republican Party
- In office 2002–2004
- Preceded by: Manny Hoffman
- Succeeded by: Gary Skoien

Member of the Illinois House of Representatives from the 36th district
- In office 1993–1997
- Preceded by: Andrew J. McGann
- Succeeded by: James D. Brosnahan

Worth Township Clerk
- In office 1985–1989

Personal details
- Born: Maureen Toolan; November 14, 1952 Chicago, Illinois, U.S.
- Died: August 9, 2008 (aged 55) Chicago, Illinois, U.S.
- Party: Republican
- Spouse: Jack Murphy (m. 1970)
- Children: 5
- Occupation: Realtor

Maureen Murphy (née Toolan; November 14, 1952 – August 9, 2008) was an American politician in the Republican Party. She held several offices in Illinois, serving as a member of the Illinois House of Representatives and the Cook County Board of Review, and chairing the Cook County Republican Party from 2002 to 2004.

== Early life and career ==
She was born Maureen Toolan in Chicago and grew up in the suburb of Blue Island, Illinois. She married Jack Murphy in 1970, and they settled in the Chicago suburb of Evergreen Park. They had five sons, one of whom died shortly after birth in 1983.

After working as a realtor, Murphy served on the Evergreen Park High School Board (to which she was elected in 1982) and as Worth Township Clerk (from 1985 to 1989). In 1988, she ran unsuccessfully for the Republican nomination for Cook County Recorder of Deeds, losing the Republican primary to Bernard Stone.

== Political career ==
She was elected to the Illinois House of Representatives representing Illinois' 36th district from 1993 to 1997; while State Representative, she chaired the House revenue committee. Maureen Murphy also served as Worth Township Republican Committeeman.

Murphy served as chairman of the Cook County Republican Party from 2002 to 2004; she was the first woman to hold that position.

She also served as the 1st district Commissioner of the Cook County Board of Review from 1998 to 2007. In her last two years of the board, she joined Joseph Berrios to block the reforms championed by its remaining member, Larry Rogers, Jr. On November 7, 2006 Murphy was defeated in her bid for reelection losing to Democrat Brendan F. Houlihan by a narrow margin of 2.4%.

During the 2008 Republican Party presidential primaries, Murphy worked on behalf of the presidential campaign of former U.S. Senator Fred Thompson as a congressional district chair for Illinois's 1st congressional district.

Maureen was the first woman, first Republican, and first suburban resident to serve on the Cook County Board of Review.

== Death ==
Murphy died from lung cancer at Rush University Medical Center in Chicago on August 9, 2008, at the age of 55.
