= Joseph Berrios =

American politician (born 1952)

Joe Berrios
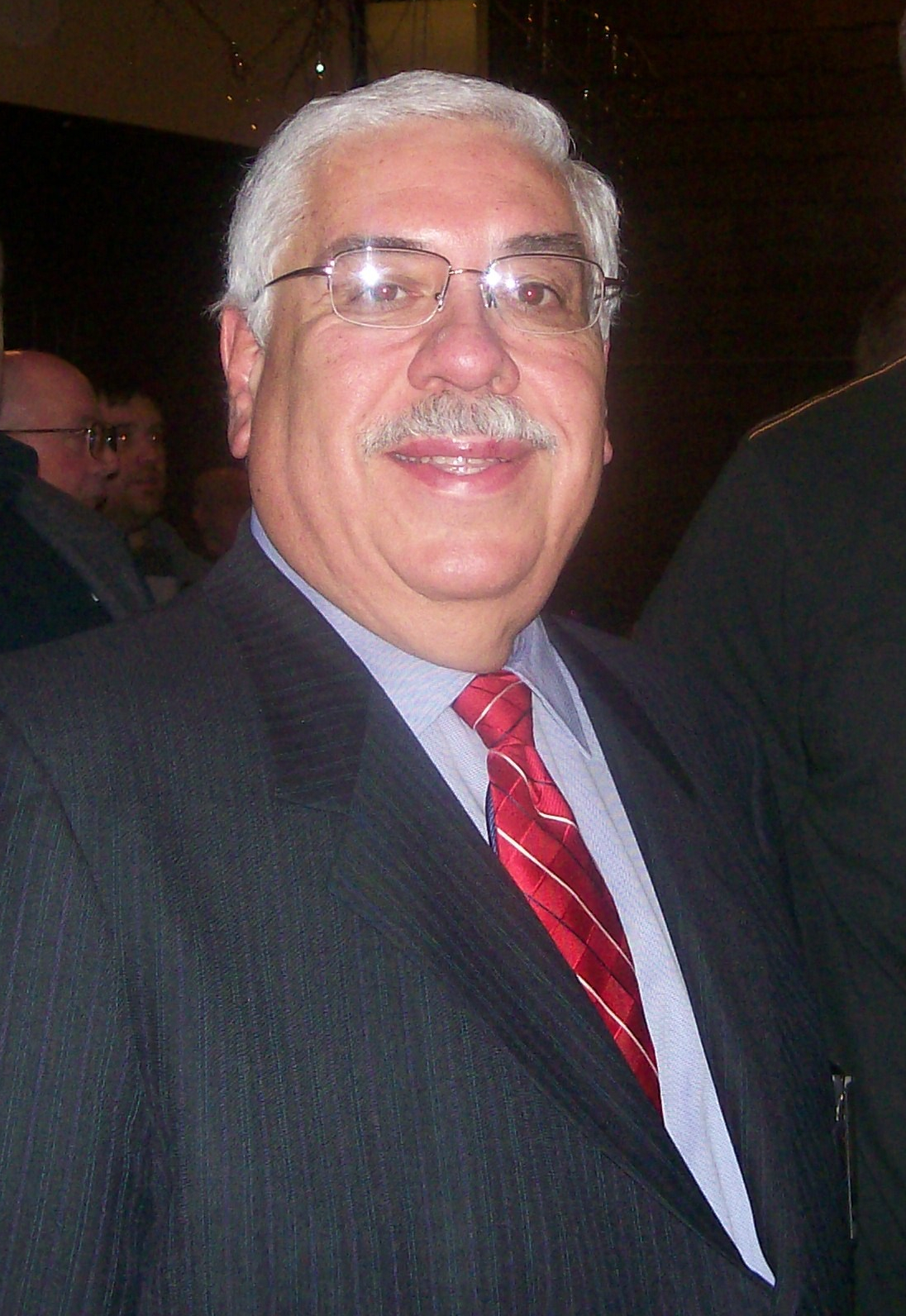
- Berrios in 2013

Cook County Assessor
- In office December 6, 2010 – December 3, 2018
- Preceded by: James Houlihan
- Succeeded by: Fritz Kaegi

Chairman of the Cook County Democratic Party
- In office 2007–2018
- Preceded by: Thomas G. Lyons
- Succeeded by: Toni Preckwinkle

Commissioner of Cook County Board of Review from the 2nd district
- In office 1998–2010
- Preceded by: Position established
- Succeeded by: Michael Cabonargi

Commissioner of the Cook County Board of Appeals
- In office 1988–1998
- Preceded by: Thomas A. Jaconetty
- Succeeded by: Position abolished

Member of the Illinois House of Representatives from the 9th district
- In office 1981 – 1987
- Preceded by: Constituency established
- Succeeded by: Miguel A. Santiago

Personal details
- Born: February 14, 1952 (age 74) Chicago, Illinois, U.S.
- Party: Democratic
- Education: University of Illinois, Chicago (BA)

Joseph "Joe" Berrios (born February 14, 1952) is an American Democratic politician who was the Assessor and Chairman of the Cook County Democratic Party of Cook County, Illinois, as well as a registered Illinois state government lobbyist. He was the first Hispanic American to serve in the Illinois General Assembly and the first and only Hispanic American to chair the Cook County Democratic Party. He was also a commissioner on the Cook County Board of Review, a property tax assessment appeal panel.

Throughout his career, Berrios combined government sector jobs, elected office, unpaid political party leadership positions, and private-sector proprietorships in lobbying, consulting and insurance sales. His political campaign strategies included ballot access challenges to potential opponents. He has been the focus of investigations into allegations of ethics violations and political corruption with respect to campaign fund-raising and nepotism. In the press and in the courts, Berrios has repeatedly defended his right as an elected official to hire relatives and to accept campaign contributions from those with business with his office.

Berrios was defeated in the March 20, 2018 Democratic primary election for Cook County Assessor, conceding to Fritz Kaegi.

== Early life, education, and early political career ==
Berrios was born on February 14, 1952, the oldest of seven children. His parents were Puerto Rican natives. When he was six, his family moved into the Cabrini-Green public housing high-rises. At age 13, Berrios got a job as a dishwasher in the Tower Club, a private restaurant on the 39th floor of the Civic Opera House, worked there for seven years, and eventually become a waiter. Berrios graduated from Lane Technical College Prep High School in Chicago, and received a bachelor's degree in accounting from the University of Illinois Chicago.

Berrios' first political role was the unpaid position of a precinct captain in the 31st Ward political organization of Alderman Thomas Keane, Chicago Mayor Richard J. Daley's chief ally on the Chicago City Council. Berrios first met Keane while a student at the University of Illinois Chicago, Berrios was ticketed for speeding on the Kennedy Expressway and called on his alderman and committeeman Keane. In October 1974, Keane was convicted of conspiracy and mail fraud for using his elected office to profit from illegal real estate deals. His wife, Adeline succeeded him as alderman and Edward Nedza as committeeman. In 1978 Nedza won the Illinois state Senate seat from the 5th Senate district, which encompasses the Humboldt Park neighborhood of Chicago, and much of the 31st ward. Nedza, a Polish-American, recognized the growing Puerto Rican population in his district, and groomed Hispanics within the Democratic Party. Nedza's political protegés included Alderman Miguel Santiago of the 31st ward, the only Hispanic on the Chicago City Council at the time, and Berrios.

== Illinois State Representative ==
Chicago-area Latino groups contested the legislative district map of the Illinois General Assembly in United States federal court. The panel of judges that decided the case ordered a new map that gave Hispanics a majority in two Illinois House of Representatives districts in Chicago, the 9th, which is predominantly Puerto Rican, and the 20th, which is predominantly Mexican American. In 1982, Nedza sponsored Berrios, at the time chief clerk to Cook County Board of Appeals commissioner Harry H. Semrow, in the 9th district. Berrios was one of three candidates who filed nominating petitions to run in the Democratic primary, but Berrios ran unopposed when the petitions of the other two candidates were successfully challenged. Republicans fielded no candidate in their primary, so Berrios ran unopposed in the general election, and at the age of 30 became the first Hispanic American to serve in the Illinois General Assembly. Berrios ran for re-election unopposed in the Fall 1986 general election. He won re-election twice, serving three two-year terms.

Berrios maintained his job in Chicago as chief clerk of the Cook County Board of (Tax) Appeals while serving part-time as a legislator in the state capital in downstate Springfield, Illinois. In December, 1985 he was one of 21 state legislators criticised for holding a second, taxpayer-salaried government job in a report issued by the Coalition for Political Honesty, founded by Board of (Tax) Appeals Commissioner Pat Quinn, later Illinois Treasurer, Lieutenant Governor and Governor.

== Democratic party posts ==
=== 31st ward Democratic committeeman ===
In March 1987 then former State Senator Edward Nedza, Berrios' mentor, was indicted in a federal investigation of bribes allegedly paid to city licensing officials. In April, 1987 Nedza resigned his position as committeeman of the 31st ward in Chicago and named Berrios as his replacement. In August, 1987, Nedza was convicted on federal charges of using his political office for illegal financial gain.

Berrios allied with Alderman Edward Vrdolyak, during Chicago Mayor Harold Washington's first term, the Council Wars era. In 1987 Raymond Figueroa, with Washington's backing, defeated Berrios's candidate for alderman, Miguel Santiago, which helped close the Council Wars. A year later Figueroa defeated Berrios for committeeman. In 1991, Figueroa decided not to run for re-election as alderman, and left the committeeman's job the following year. Berrios regained the committeeman's post, a role he has held ever since.

=== Chairman, Cook County Democratic Party ===
Thomas G. Lyons, a veteran 45th Ward committeeman who had held the unpaid party position of chairman of the Cook County Democratic Party for nearly 17 years, was seriously ill and announced his retirement in January 2007, and died on January 12 at age 75. Democrats met in Chicago on February 1 to fill the vacancy and elected Berrios as their new chairman. Berrios was the first Hispanic to hold the post, which he held until April 18, 2018, following his defeat in the Democratic primary for Cook County Assessor.

== Commissioner on the Cook County Board of Appeals/Cook County Board of Review ==
Berrios' boss at the Cook County Board of Appeals, Harry H. Semrow, died November 23, 1987, at age 72. In accordance with state law, the Chief Judge of the Cook County Circuit Court appointed a temporary replacement, attorney Thomas A. Jaconetty, 34, a deputy assessor with the Board of Appeals since 1981. Jaconnetty was a 31st ward resident and the secretary of Berrios' 31st ward Democratic organization with whom Berrios had been a precinct captain in the 31st Ward under Alderman Keane. Berrios ran for the vacancy with the backing of the Democratic party organization. In the Democratic primary, Berrios won the nomination with a sizable margin over Jeffrey Paul Smith, an assistant corporation counsel with the City of Chicago whose candidacy was sponsored by Quinn, by then a former Commissioner. He ultimately won the special election in November 1988. Berrios would be reelected to the Cook County Board of Appeals in 1990 and 1994.

When first elected to the Board of (Tax) Appeals in 1988, Berrios was paid about $56,000 a year. In October 1990, Berrios added a part-time job as a legislative aide to a political ally, Democratic State Representative Miguel Santiago. The job paid Berrios nearly $10,000 over the next two years. Also while working at the tax appeals board, Berrios worked as a lobbyist and a consultant to the state government, sometimes in association with his longtime business partner, Sam Panayotovich. From 1988 to 1993, Panayotovich and Berrios won a $185,000 no-bid contract as the Illinois Department of Transportation's (IDOT's) liaison with lawmakers and municipal officials.

On March 11, 1994, FBI agents executed a search warrant to confiscate records from the Cook County Board of (Tax) Appeals as part of an ongoing investigation. Weeks later, federal agents investigating ghost payrolling subpoenaed financial records regarding several past and current employees of the Board, including Berrios and Panayotovich. The US Treasury Department investigated the IDOT contracts with Berrios and Panayotovich, and a federal grand jury subpoenaed the contracts. A federal grand jury in Chicago subpoenaed records documenting the recipients of tuition waivers to state universities request by three current and two former state legislators, including Berrios and Panayotovich. The scholarship program, begun in 1905, allowed each state legislator to waive the tuition and fees of any of the state's 12 public universities, for any two students who live within the legislator's district, without regard to academic achievement or financial need. No charges were filed against anyone in the Cook County Board of (Tax) Appeals.

The Cook County Board of Appeals was reconstituted and renamed the Cook County Board of Review in 1998. Berrios was elected to the reconstituted body's 2nd district in that year's inaugural election. Berrios continued to serve until 2010, being reelected in 2002, 2006, and 2008 After Berrios resigned to become Cook County Assessor, Michael Cabonargi was appointed as his successor.

In a 2013 federal bribery trial of a Board of Review analyst, in secret recordings by an undercover FBI informant from 2008, the defendant named Berrios as a recipient of bribes. Berrios was not accused of any wrongdoing.

=== Hiring of relatives and friends ===
While Commissioner on the Board of Review, Berrios' sister, sister-in-law, son and daughter worked for the county at annual salaries ranging from $48,000 to $86,000. "Let me see, one, two, three ... yeah, four," Berrios told the Associated Press. Berrios also hired, as a deputy chief commissioner, election law attorney Jaconetty, who wrote the chapter on ballot access in the courseware of the Illinois Institute for Continuing Legal Education. Berrios responded to criticisms of his hiring of relatives and friends, said,

What you're basically saying is that Joe Berrios should get out of politics. If my brothers or whoever wants to come and work in government, they shouldn't be allowed to work in government. If you want to pass a law that says one individual is in government, then none of their friends or relatives can work in government, then you should pass that law.

=== Political fundraising from tax appeal lawyers ===
Board of (Tax) Appeals Commissioner Berrios regularly accepted hundreds of thousands of dollars a year in campaign contributions from lawyers who appealed property tax assessments before the Board. Berrios controls five personal political action committees, not including the fund for the Cook County Democratic Party, which he also controls. Berrios collected more than $3 million in political contributions between 2000 and 2010, 64 percent from property tax appeal lawyers. About one-third of Berrios' campaign contributions in that decade came from the 15 property tax appeal law firms that gained the most for their clients between 2006 and 2008, contributing almost $1 million to six political action committees controlled by Berrios and his daughter, Illinois State Representative Maria Antonia Berrios, Democrat of the 39th Illinois House district on Chicago's northwest side. Berrios started 2008 with $1.2 million in just one of his several campaign funds, much of it from attorneys who appeared before him.

Several of the most successful property tax appeal law firms in Cook County have strong political connections. From 2006 to 2008, the tax appeal law firms that received the largest reductions for their clients were those of Representative Michael J. Madigan (the Illinois House Speaker, a Chicago Democrat and close ally of Berrios), Patrick J. Cullerton (the brother of Illinois State Senator John Cullerton, the president of the Illinois Senate), and Chicago Alderman Edward M. Burke. Simultaneously, Berrios worked as a registered lobbyist to Illinois state government on issues such as legalizing video poker. Berrios lobbies Madigan and Cullerton in Springfield, while the Assessor is critical to the lucrative commercial real-estate tax appeals practices of law firms, including those of Madigan and Cullerton. "Illinois, thy name is conflict of interest," wrote Better Government Association Executive Director Andy Shaw in the Chicago Tribune in 2009. "Even by Illinois's loose conflict of interest standards, the obviousness of the Madigan-Berrios connection is stupefying," wrote Chicago Magazine in 2013.

== Cook County Assessor ==
=== Campaign and election ===
Cook County Assessor James Houlihan announced that he would not seek re-election in 2010. Within hours, Berrios said he planned to announce his candidacy for assessor. On February 2, 2010, Berrios won the three-way Democratic primary with 39% of the vote, in a primary with the lowest turn-out since 1958.

Berrios' candidacy was denounced by local editorial boards. The Chicago Tribune editorial board described Berrios as "a terrible candidate for the powerful office of assessor" and called the Democratic Party of Cook County's slating of Berrios for Assessor a "miserable mistake," citing "his disregard for basic ethical principles" and "patent conflicts of interest." The Chicago Sun-Times editorial board called the slating a "tragedy," describing Berrios as "a fine example, in fact, of why Illinois needs serious campaign finance reform with teeth in it," and citing Berrios' lack of transparency on the Board of Review, his record of hiring family and friends, and his "cozy" relationship with Madigan. The Daily Herald editorial board called Berrios "the very antithesis of what the office needs." A profile in Chicago Magazine described him as "a consummate insider in Illinois politics" and "a vivid example of the clout-infested politics for which Illinois is famous."

On Monday morning, September 13, 2010, while candidate Berrios was at a campaign fund-raising breakfast, the Finance Committee of the Cook County Board met and approved a package of ethics reforms in response to Berrios, including a measure that required candidates for Assessor or the Board of Review to return contributions from property tax appeal lawyers of more than $1,500, and prohibiting public officials from conducting political activities while at work for the county or using county resources. "The law stinks, bottom line," Berrios said.

Cook County Commissioner Forrest Claypool filed nominating petitions to run as an independent candidate for assessor. Berrios dropped a challenge to Claypool's nominating petitions after Berrios' lawyers examined Claypool's 90,000 signatures, 65,000 more than required. Berrios prevailed in the November 2010 general election with 46 percent of the vote in a field that also included Republican Sharon Strobeck-Eckersall. Claypool attributed his defeat to his failure to get enough suburban support to offset Berrios' organization in Chicago.

=== Campaign fundraising in excess of County limits ===
Assessor Berrios was investigated by the Cook County Board of Ethics for allegedly accepting excessive political contributions from attorneys who argued property-tax appeals before the Assessor and Board of Review. The Board of Ethics sent letters to 15 tax attorneys, warning that their donations to Berrios during the 2010 election cycle had exceeded the county campaign contribution limits. Berrios' attorney objected that the regulation was "illegal", and Berrios sought an advisory opinion from the Cook County State's Attorney. In February 2011, a Cook County Deputy State's Attorney wrote an advisory opinion that the County Board lacked the home rule authority to limit campaign contributions to the Assessor and that state campaign finance law prevails. The County Board's legal counsel issued an opinion that the new contribution limits were unconstitutional. Cook County commissioners scaled back the campaign finance reform law and the Cook County Board of Ethics dropped its investigation of Berrios' campaign contributions.

=== Hiring and promoting relatives and friends ===
Days after taking office, Berrios hired his son, sister and Jaconetty to work for him, bringing them over from the property tax appeals board. The family members received raises in their new positions. Berrios also brought over from the property tax appeals board veteran staff member, Felix Cardona Jr., the treasurer for Citizens for Maria A. Berrios, Berrios' daughter's campaign committee. Asked if the hirings confirmed past criticisms, Berrios said: "I still won the election."

Patrick Blanchard, the county's Inspector General, and MaryNic Foster, Executive Director of the Cook County Board of Ethics, the County's top two government watchpersons, issued a joint advisory memo to County Board President Toni Preckwinkle, all 17 Cook County commissioners, and nine other elected county officials, including Berrios, warning them that hiring relatives violated county ethics laws. The Cook County Board of Ethics initiated an investigation of Berrios. The federal-court appointed attorneys monitoring City of Chicago and Cook County compliance with the Shakman decrees, designed to prevent politics from influencing most personnel decisions, raised objections to as many as 27 hirings and firings in the first month of the Berrios administration of the Assessor's office. On January 28, 2011, to comply with County Board President Preckwinkle's request for across-the-board 16 percent budget cuts to help close an estimated $487 million budget shortfall, Berrios laid off 53 employees, of which 48 were members of unions, but Berrios' relatives remained on the payroll. On July 17, 2013, the Cook County Board approved $529,000 in settlements to 11 former employees of the Assessor's office that the court-appointed Shakman decree monitor had determined had been fired unlawfully by Berrios for political reasons.

While the Cook County Board of Ethics consideration of Berrios' possible violations of County nepotism ordinances was pending, reports by WGN-TV, the Better Government Association, and Chicago Magazine questioned Berrios' relationship to John J. Pikarski, the Board's chairman, and also a prominent, long-time real estate zoning attorney. Pikarski's law firm had represented clients before the County Board of Review on which Berrios served, and had donated thousands of dollars to Berrios' political campaigns. One day after the release of the joint investigations, Pikarski resigned.

In its final determination dated June 20, 2012, the Cook County Board of Ethics recommended that Berrios remove his son and sister from the County payroll and fined Berrios $10,000 total ($5,000 for each of two relatives he hired). "To me it's not big deal, because I've been told by the state's attorney they have no power over us," Berrios said. A Chicago Tribune editorial called Berrios' hiring of his relatives "a flagrant violation of the county's ethics rules." County Board President Preckwinkle said,

I've always said throughout my political career that if you're in public office, you should not hire your relatives. This is not appropriate. And it leads to the perception that government is only for friends and family. And that's neither good nor right.

Preckwinkle fired Foster in May, 2013. "Joe is a political ally," Preckwinkle said.

Cook County State's Attorney Anita Alvarez declined to represent Berrios or the Board of Ethics in the nepotism issue, citing conflict of interest. A Cook County Circuit Court judge appointed an outside lawyer to represent Berrios before the Board of Ethics beginning in April 2011, and the firm billed the county $4,773 for its work as of September, 2012. The Board of Ethics rejected Berrios' appeal of the final determination. By November, 2012, 15 members of Berrios' family were on state or county payrolls or receiving state or county pensions. Berrios topped the "Hall of Shame" category in "Chicago's Best and Worst Politicians of 2012" in Chicago Magazine's December, 2012 issue. The Board of Ethics petitioned the courts for a special prosecutor, and a judge appointed attorney and former Chicago Inspector General David H. Hoffman. By March, 2013, Berrios had billed the County $24,716 for his defense against the Board of Ethics' ruling. In April, 2015 the judge ruled that the Board of Ethics had no authority to impose fines on the Assessor. As of June, 2016, twelve Berrios relatives were government employees or receiving public pensions, totalling nearly $1.1 million a year.

Cook County homeowners are eligible for a property-tax break on their primary residence, but a manager in Assessor's office was granted the homeowner's exemption on two homes. In 2012 Cook County Inspector General Blanchard subpoenaed the Assessor's office seeking documents related to the exemptions. Berrios ignored the subpoena, claiming that the County Inspector General has no authority over him. Blanchard filed suit against Berrios. Berrios is represented in the suit by Cook County State's Attorney Alvarez. On January 15, 2014, a Cook County circuit court judge ruled that the County Inspector General had the authority to investigate the Assessor and all other independently elected County offices. On August 21, 2014, the judge ruled the Assessor must comply with the Inspector General's subpoena. On December 1, 2016, the Illinois Supreme Court unanimously ruled that the Cook County Inspector General has the power to investigate the Cook County Assessor, affirming two lower court decisions.

== Business interests and personal life ==
Berrios is a partner with Sam Panayotovich in, and secretary of, a lobbying firm, B-P Consulting, Inc. with offices in Springfield and downtown Chicago. Lobbying clients include the Illinois Licensed Beverage Association and the Illinois Coin Machine Operators Association, manufacturers and distributors of video poker machines. Berrios is President of an insurance agency, J B Insurance - Consulting Inc. with an office in downtown Chicago.

Berrios lives in the Belmont Cragin neighborhood on Chicago's Northwest Side. He is the father of three children, including former Illinois State Representative Maria Antonia "Toni" Berrios.

On June 15, 2023, Berrios' son-in-law James Weiss, who is Toni's husband, would be convicted in a bribery case which also involved two Illinois state legislators, Terry Link and Luis Arroyo. On October 11, 2023, Weiss would be sentenced to 5 1/2 years in prison. On October 16, 2024, Weiss' brother Joseph would also be sentenced to 60 days in prison after pleading guilty in May 2024 to one count of one count of making false statements to federal agents after lying to the FBI and IRS about the Berrios son-in-law's ties to the late Chicago mobster Frank “The German” Schweihs. Weiss, who is currently serving his prison sentence at a federal prison facility in Minnesota, is not due to be released until August 2028.
