= 1994 Cook County, Illinois, elections =

- November 8, 1994
- Turnout: 48.16%

The Cook County, Illinois, general election was held on November 8, 1994.

Primaries were held March 15, 1994.

Elections were held for Assessor, Clerk, Sheriff, Treasurer, President of the Cook County Board of Commissioners, all 17 seats of the Cook County Board of Commissioners, both seats of the Cook County Board of Appeals, seats on the Water Reclamation District Board, and judgeships in the Circuit Court of Cook County.

The Democratic Party performed well, winning a full sweep of all countywide offices and 11 out of 17 seats on the Cook County Board of Commissioners. This came despite 1994 having been a strong Republican election cycle nationally, including in Illinois’ statewide elections (with the national election cycle being dubbed the “Republican Revolution”).

== Election information ==
1994 was a midterm election year in the United States. The primaries and general elections for Cook County races coincided with those for congressional elections and those for state elections.

=== Voter turnout ===
==== Primary election ====
Turnout in the primaries was 34.58%, with 911,577 ballots cast. Chicago saw 555,937 ballots cast and suburban Cook County saw 23.95% turnout (with 355,620 ballots cast).

Vote totals of primaries
| Primary | Chicago vote totals | Suburban Cook County vote totals | Total Cook County vote totals |
|---|---|---|---|
| Democratic | 525,752 | 213,002 | 738,754 |
| Republican | 24,391 | 132,478 | 156,869 |
| Harold Washington Party | 564 | 110 | 674 |
| Harold Washington Party/Democratic | 3,826 | 1,669 | 5,495 |
| Harold Washington Party/Republican | 244 | 171 | 415 |
| Nonpartisan | 1,160 | 8,190 | 9,350 |
| Total | 555,937 | 355,620 | 911,557 |

==== General election ====
The general election saw turnout of 48.16%, with 1,267,152 ballots cast. Chicago saw 586,235 ballots cast, while suburban Cook County saw 50.54% turnout (with 680,917 ballots cast).

== Assessor ==
1994 Cook County Assessor election
- November 8, 1994
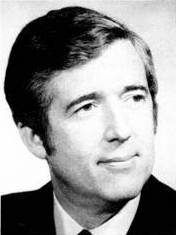

| Nominee | Thomas Hynes | Sandra C. Wilson-Muriel |
| Party | Democratic | Republican |
| Popular vote | 725,866 | 340,151 |
Assessor before election
Thomas Hynes
Democratic
Elected Assessor
Thomas Hynes
Democratic

In the 1994 Cook County Assessor election, incumbent assessor Thomas Hynes, a Democrat, was elected to a fifth full-term.

=== Primaries ===
==== Democratic ====
Cook County Assessor Democratic primary
| Party | Candidate | Votes | % |
|---|---|---|---|
| Democratic | Thomas Hynes (incumbent) | 444,436 | 100 |
| Total votes | | 444,436 | 100 |

==== Republican ====
Cook County Assessor Republican primary
| Party | Candidate | Votes | % |
|---|---|---|---|
| Republican | Sandra C. Wilson-Muriel | 98,084 | 100 |
| Total votes | | 98,084 | 100 |

==== Harold Washington Party ====
Cook County Assessor Harold Washington Party primary
| Party | Candidate | Votes | % |
|---|---|---|---|
| Harold Washington | Donald Pamon | 3,076 | 100 |
| Total votes | | 3,076 | 100 |

=== General election ===
Democrat Hynes won by a roughly 35-point margin. He defeated Republican nominee Sandra C. Wilson-Muriel, as well as Harold Washington Party nominee Donald Pamon and Populist Party nominee Loretha Weisinger.

Cook County Assessor election
| Party | Candidate | Votes | % |
|---|---|---|---|
| Democratic | Thomas Hynes (incumbent) | 725,866 | |
| Republican | Sandra C. Wilson-Muriel | 340,151 | |
| Harold Washington | Donald Pamon | 47,682 | |
| Populist | Loretha Weisinger | | |
| Total votes | | | 100 |

== Clerk ==
1994 Cook County Clerk election
- November 8, 1994
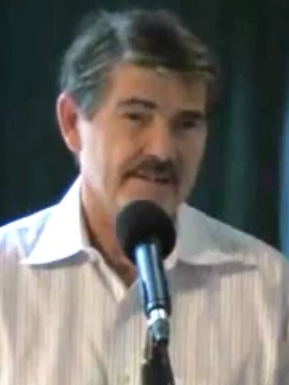

| Candidate | David Orr | Edward Howlett |
| Party | Democratic | Republican |
| Popular vote | 720,132 | 381,445 |
Clerk before election
David Orr
Democratic
Elected Clerk
David Orr
Democratic

In the 1994 Cook County Clerk election, incumbent first-term clerk David Orr, a Democrat, was reelected.

=== Primaries ===
==== Democratic ====
Cook County Clerk Democratic primary
| Party | Candidate | Votes | % |
|---|---|---|---|
| Democratic | David D. Orr (incumbent) | 454,873 | 76,37 |
| Democratic | Patricia Young | 140,290 | 23.63 |
| Total votes | | 595,163 | 100 |

==== Republican ====
Cook County Clerk Republican primary
| Party | Candidate | Votes | % |
|---|---|---|---|
| Republican | Edward G. Howlett | 102,454 | 100 |
| Total votes | | 102,454 | 100 |

==== Harold Washington Party ====
Cook County Clerk Harold Washington Party primary
| Party | Candidate | Votes | % |
|---|---|---|---|
| Harold Washington | Herman W. Baker, Jr. | 2,154 | 50.77 |
| Harold Washington | Vivian Stewart Tyler | 2,089 | 49.23 |
| Total votes | | 4,243 | 100 |

=== General election ===
David Orr was reelected by a roughly 30-point margin. He defeated Republican nominee Edward Howlett, as well as Harold Washington Party nominee Herman W. Baker, Jr. and Populist Party nominee Curtis Jones.

Cook County Clerk election
| Party | Candidate | Votes | % |
|---|---|---|---|
| Democratic | David Orr (incumbent) | 720,132 | |
| Republican | Edward Howlett | 381,445 | |
| Harold Washington | Herman W. Baker, Jr. | 30,754 | |
| Populist | Curtis Jones | | |
| Total votes | | | 100 |

== Sheriff ==
1994 Cook County Sheriff election
- November 8, 1994
| Candidate | Michael F. Sheahan | John D. Tourtelot |
| Party | Democratic | Republican |
Sheriff before election
Michael F. Sheahan
Democratic
Elected Sheriff
Michael F. Sheahan
Democratic

In the 1994 Cook County Sheriff election, incumbent first-term sheriff Michael F. Sheahan, a Democrat, was reelected.

=== Primaries ===
==== Democratic ====
Cook County Sheriff Democratic primary
| Party | Candidate | Votes | % |
|---|---|---|---|
| Democratic | Michael F. Sheahan (incumbent) | 388,977 | 67.41 |
| Democratic | Tommy H. Brewer | 188,025 | 32.59 |
| Total votes | | 577,002 | 100 |

==== Republican ====
No candidate ran in the Republican primary for Sheriff. The party ultimately nominated John D. Tourtelot.

==== Harold Washington Party ====
Cook County Sheriff Harold Washington Party primary
| Party | Candidate | Votes | % |
|---|---|---|---|
| Harold Washington | William A. Brown | 3,076 | 100 |
| Total votes | | 3,076 | 100 |

=== General election ===
Michael F. Sheahan was reelected by a roughly 40-point margin. He defeated Republican nominee John D. Tourtelot, as well as Harold Washington Party nominee William A. Brown and Populist Party nominee William J. Benson.

== Treasurer ==
1994 Cook County Treasurer election
- November 8, 1994
| Candidate | Edward J. Rosewell | Jean Reyes Pechette |
| Party | Democratic | Republican |
| Popular vote | 643,313 | 389,131 |
Treasurer before election
Edward J. Rosewell
Democratic
Elected Treasurer
Edward J. Rosewell
Democratic

In the 1994 Cook County Treasurer election, incumbent fifth-term treasurer Edward J. Rosewell, a Democrat, was reelected.

=== Primaries ===
==== Democratic ====
Cook County Treasurer Democratic primary
| Party | Candidate | Votes | % |
|---|---|---|---|
| Democratic | Edward J. Rosewell (incumbent) | 423,290 | 100 |
| Total votes | | 423,290 | 100 |

==== Republican ====
Cook County Treasurer Republican primary
| Party | Candidate | Votes | % |
|---|---|---|---|
| Republican | Jean Reyes Pechette | 111,506 | 100 |
| Total votes | | 111,506 | 100 |

==== Harold Washington Party ====
Cook County Treasurer Harold Washington Party primary
| Party | Candidate | Votes | % |
|---|---|---|---|
| Harold Washington | Robert J. Pettis | 2,089 | 50.47 |
| Harold Washington | Atara Young | 1,962 | 49.53 |
| Total votes | | 4,051 | 100 |

=== General election ===
Rosewell was reelected by a more than 20-point margin. He defeated Republican nominee Jean Reyes Pechette, as well as Harold Washington Party nominee Robert J. Pettis and Populist Party nominee John Justice.

Cook County Treasurer election
| Party | Candidate | Votes | % |
|---|---|---|---|
| Democratic | Edward J. Rosewell | 643,313 | |
| Republican | Jean Reyes Pechette | 389,131 | |
| Harold Washington | Robert J. Pettis | 55,017 | |
| Populist | John Justice | | |
| Total votes | | | 100 |

== President of the Cook County Board of Commissioners ==
1994 President of the Cook County Board of Commissioners election
- November 8, 1994
| Nominee | John Stroger | Joe Morris |
| Party | Democratic | Republican |
| Popular vote | 681,078 | 397,241 |
President before election
Richard Phelan
Democratic
Elected President
John Stroger
Democratic

In the 1994 President of the Cook County Board of Commissioners election, incumbent first-term president Richard Phelan, a Democrat, did not seek reelection. Democrat, John Stroger, was elected to succeed him in office. Stroger was the first African-American to be elected to the office.

=== Primaries ===
==== Democratic ====
The primary was won by John Stroger Jr., a longtime member of the Cook County Board of Commissioners. He defeated Cook County Clerk of Courts Aurelia Pucinski and county board member Maria Pappas. Stroger had received the endorsement of the Cook County Democratic Party organization prior to the primary.

Stroger and Pappas also were seeking simultaneous election to district seats on the board, while Puchinski opted against doing this.

Pappas centered her platform on passing a "truth in budgeting" bill she had previously proposed on the commission. She proposed reducing waseful spending by the county government. She also spoke of revisiting the question of whether the planned new facility for Cook County Hospital was genuinely a necessary expenditure. Pucinski released a 50-point policy platform, which included proposals to ban government agencies from being involved in "for profit" activity and imposing a 1,000% tax on bullets. She also promised that she would release quarterly reports updating residents on the status of her fulfillment of campaign pledges.

President of the Cook County Board of Commissioners Democratic primary
| Party | Candidate | Votes | % |
|---|---|---|---|
| Democratic | John Stroger, Jr. | 308,944 | 47.63 |
| Democratic | Aurelia Marie Pucinski | 185,266 | 28.56 |
| Democratic | Maria Pappas | 154,543 | 23.82 |
| Total votes | | 648,753 | 100 |

==== Republican ====
Joe Morris received the Republican nomination, running unopposed on the ballot in the Republican primary. Morris, an attorney, was a first-time candidate for elected office. He had previously worked at the Equal Opportunity Commission as the first assistant to then-director Clarence Thomas (who had by 1994 been appointed to the Supreme Court of the United States). Morris was a conservative, and campaigned on a platform of giving the county government a "complete overhaul", including a holding convention and referendum for the purposes of authoring and ratifying a new county charter. Morris proposed passing legislation to prevent the board president from simultaneously serving as a member of the board itself (and therefore, unlike Stroger and Pappas, he did not contest a district board seat while seeking the presidency). Morris championed abolishing the offices of assessor, clerk, recorder of deeds, and treasurer and instead folding them into a new united executive branch to function under the purview of the county board president. He also proposed consolidating the [[[Metropolitan Water Reclamation District]] into the Cook County Government, and placing term limits on its board members. He also proposed privatizing the Cook County Hospital and ceasing any new hospital construction. He also spoke of creating new business incentives and championing stronger regional coordination in Chicagoland on matters of law enforcement.

Originally, Palatine village president Rita Mullins was running for the nomination, but she withdrew her candidacy. Her candidacy posed an conundrum for the county party, as she wanted to also run for a board seat if she were to run for the board presidency. However, the district in her area had been specifically districted with considerations for incumbent Republican Richard Siebel to run for it, and if both Seibel and Mullins were to seek the same seat it would create an intraparty conflict. When she was running, Mullins' platform centered on public safety, lowering taxes, shrinking the size of the county government, and cutting public services.

Count Republicans had initially had hope that they might be able to attract a strong candidate who might be able to win the open-seat race. There had been hopes by Cook County Republican Party leadership that Donald Haider (a professor at Northwestern University, and the 1987 Republican mayoral nominee) might run. Overtures had also been made to recruit former Evanston Mayor Joan Barr to run, however she was ultimately conveyed the impression that Haider was the party organization's consensus choice to be slated for the post. Morris had indicated that he would abandon his plans to run if Haider entered the race. Haider, however, ultimately opted against running.

President of the Cook County Board of Commissioners Republican primary
| Party | Candidate | Votes | % |
|---|---|---|---|
| Republican | Joseph A. Morris | 99,238 | 100 |
| Total votes | | 99,238 | 100 |

==== Harold Washington Party ====
President of the Cook County Board of Commissioners Harold Washington Party primary
| Party | Candidate | Votes | % |
|---|---|---|---|
| Harold Washington | David R. Reed | 2,106 | 53.26 |
| Harold Washington | Bruce Crosby | 1,848 | 46.64 |
| Total votes | | 120,627 | 100 |

=== General election ===
Morris' candidacy was considered a long shot. It struggled with a lack of funds. During the general election, Stroger did not campaign heavily.

Morris proposed drastically restricting the county's government, abolishing all of the county agencies except the State's Attorney's office and replacing them with a different arrangement of departments that would have been under greater control of the president of the Cook Cook County Board of Commissioners.

Stroger was simultaneously running for a district seat on the board, while Morris opted not to seek a district seat and proposed passing a law prohibiting individuals from simultaneously holding both of these offices.

In August 1994, amid the campaign, Roland Burris (the attorney general of Illinois) filed a state lawsuit against Morris and the Lincoln Legal Foundation alleging inconsistencies in the foundation's accounting of its finances. Morris publicly claimed innocence, and argued that the lawsuit was merely intended to hurt his candidacy. However, allegations Morris had previously been ousted from a leadership role at another organization (the Mid-America Legal Foundation) due to allegations of excessive expenditures of its funds on luxuries such as offices and travel. Morris asserted that allegations of wrongdoing at either organizations were untrue.

Stroger won by a more than 25-point margin over Republican Joe Morris. He also defeated Harold Washington Party nominee Aloysius Majerczyk and Populist Party nominee Jerome Carter.

President of the Cook County Board of Commissioners election
| Party | Candidate | Votes | % |
|---|---|---|---|
| Democratic | John Stroger | 681,078 | |
| Republican | Joe Morris | 397,241 | |
| Harold Washington | Aloysius Majerczyk | 33,886 | |
| Populist | Jerome Carter | | |
| Total votes | | | 100 |

== Superintendent of the Education Service Region ==
1990 Superintendent of the Cook County Education Education Service Region election
- November 8, 1994
| Candidate | Lloyd Lehman |
| Party | Republican |
| Popular vote | 375,110 |
| Percentage | 100% |
Superintendent before election
Lloyd Lehman
Republican
Elected Superintendent
Lloyd Lehman
Republican

Suburban Cook County elected a superintendent for the Suburban Cook County Regional Office of Education, with Republican incumbent Lloyd Lehman running unopposed in both his primary election and the general election, as no other candidates sought the office. This was the only office for which only a single candidate filed. Lehman had been appointed to the office the previous year after Richard Martwick resigned. The Chicago Tribune observed that this office may have been the "most obscure election on the ballot". This was the last election before the position was eliminated.

Cook County Superintendent of Education Service Region election
| Party | Candidate | Votes | % |
|---|---|---|---|
| Republican | Lloyd Lehman | 375,110 | 100 |
| Total votes | | 375,110 | 100 |

== Cook County Board of Commissioners ==
1994 Cook County Board of Commissioners election
- November 8, 1994

All 17 seats on the Cook County Board of Commissioners 9 seats needed for a majority
| | First party | Second party | Third party |
|---|---|---|---|
| Party | Democratic | Republican | Harold Washington |
| Seats before | 11 | 6 | 0 |
| Seats won | 11 | 6 | 0 |
| Seat change | Steady | Steady | Steady |

The 1994 Cook County Board of Commissioners election saw all seventeen seats of the Cook County Board of Commissioners up for election to four-year terms.

This was the first for the Cook County Board of Commissioners conducted with individual districts, as previous elections had been conducted through two sets of at-large elections (one for ten seats from the city of Chicago and another for seven seats from suburban Cook County).

Six of those elected were new to the Cook County Board of Commissioners.

The number of commissioners each party held remained unchanged.

== Cook County Board of Appeals ==
1994 Cook County Board of Appeals election
- November 8, 1990

2 of 2 seats on the Cook County Board of Appeals
| | First party | Second party |
|---|---|---|
| Party | Democratic | Republican |
| Seats before | 2 | 0 |
| Seats after | 2 | 0 |
| Seat change | Steady | Steady |

In the 1994 Cook County Board of Appeals election, both seats on the board were up for election. The election was an at-large election.

Incumbent Democrats Joseph Berrios and Wilson Frost were reelected.

This was the last election to the Cook County Board of Appeals, which was reconstituted in 1998 as the three-member Cook County Board of Review.

== Water Reclamation District Board ==
1994 Metropolitan Water Reclamation District of Greater Chicago election
- November 8, 1994

In the 1998 Metropolitan Water Reclamation District of Greater Chicago election took place on November 8, 1994, with primaries on March 15, 1994.

== Judicial elections ==
Partisan elections were held for judgeships on the Circuit Court of Cook County, due to vacancies. Other judgeships had retention elections.

== Ballot questions ==
=== Property tax cap advisory referendum ===
An advisory referendum was held on whether the voters of Cook County wanted the Illinois General Assembly to pass a cap on property taxes. Voters overwhelmingly supported a tax cap.

Property tax cap
| Candidate | Votes | % |
|---|---|---|
| Yes | 653,200 | 83.02 |
| No | 133,650 | 16.99 |
| Total votes | 786,850 | 100 |

== Other elections ==
Coinciding with the primaries, elections were held to elect the Democratic, Republican, and Harold Washington Party committeemen for the suburban townships.

== See also ==
- 1994 Illinois elections
