= 1983 Chicago mayoral election =

- April 12, 1983
- Turnout: 82.07% ▲21.7 pp
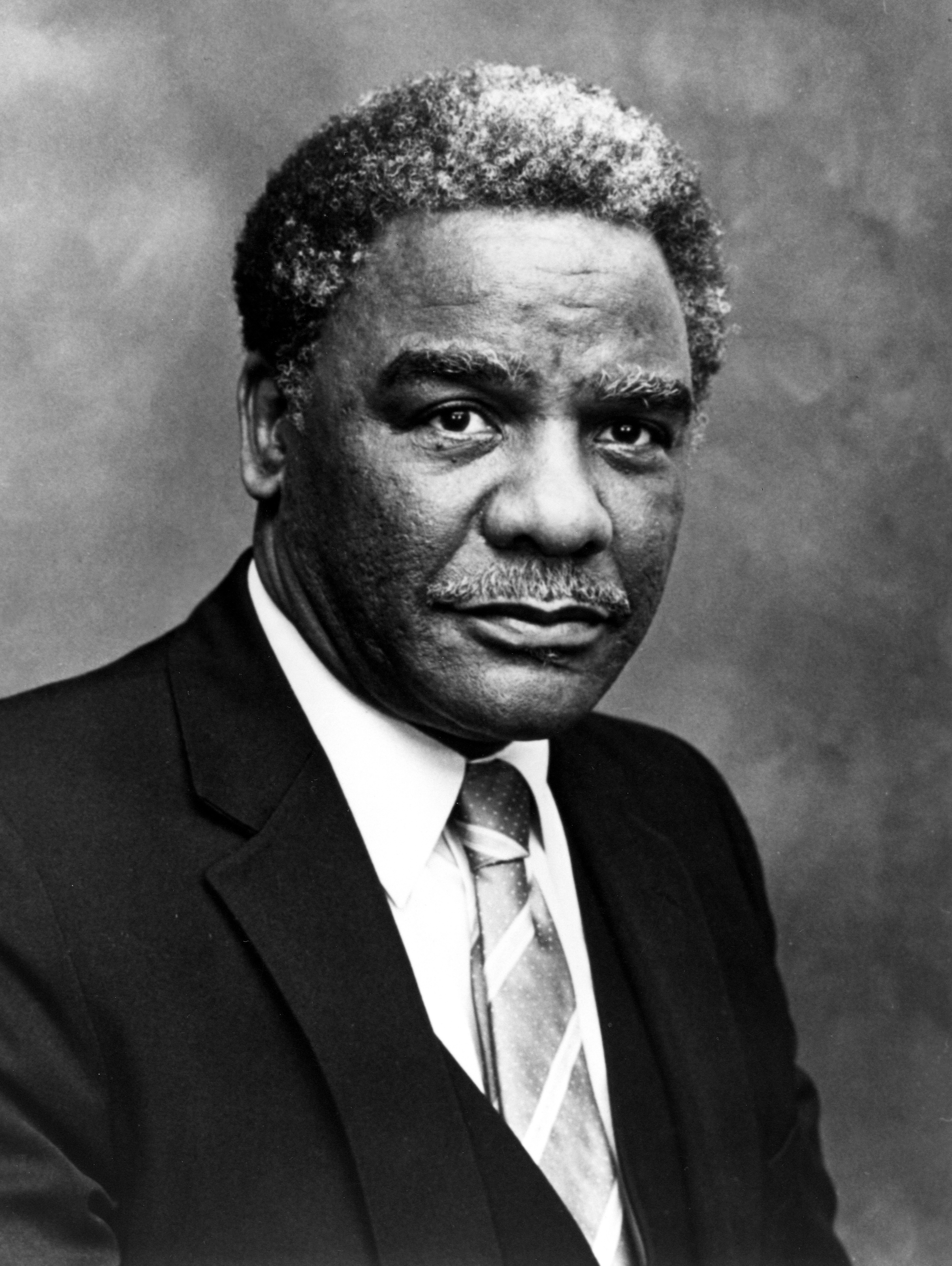

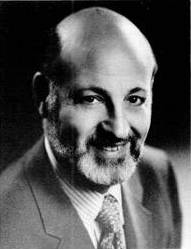
| Nominee | Harold Washington | Bernard Epton |
| Party | Democratic | Republican |
| Popular vote | 668,176 | 619,926 |
| Percentage | 51.72% | 47.99% |
- Washington: 40–50% 50–60% 60–70% 70–80% 80–90% >90% Epton: 40–50% 50–60% 60–70% 70–80% 80–90% >90% No votes
Mayor before election
Jane Byrne
Democratic
Elected Mayor
Harold Washington
Democratic

The Chicago mayoral election of 1983 began with the primary on February 22, 1983, which was followed by the general on April 12, 1983. The election resulted in the victory of Chicago's first African-American mayor, Harold Washington, over Republican Bernard Epton.

Incumbent Mayor Jane Byrne, who had served since April 16, 1979, faced primary challenges from Cook County State's Attorney Richard M. Daley and U.S. Congressman Harold Washington. Despite institutional support and a well-funded campaign, Byrne was weakened by controversies during her tenure. Daley, the son of former six-term mayor Richard J. Daley, initially led in polling but struggled to consolidate support. Harold Washington emerged as a viable challenger after significant African American voter mobilization and defeated both Byrne and Daley in the Democratic primary by nearly 3 points. On the Republican side, state Representative Bernard Epton won the nomination unopposed.

In the general election, backlash against Washington among some white voters propelled Epton's candidacy. While Epton's candidacy was initially respectful in tone, it later ran ads that observers described as racially tinged. Washington responded by challenging Epton's messaging, racial opposition to his candidacy, and resistance from segments of the Democratic machine, including aldermen who endorsed Epton. This led to an unusually competitive general election race.

Turnout in both the primary and general elections were among the highest in Chicago's history. In the general election, with 82.07% of voters casting ballots, Washington won by 3.7%, securing strong support from African American voters, while Epton carried more wards than any Republican candidate since 1927.

== Background ==
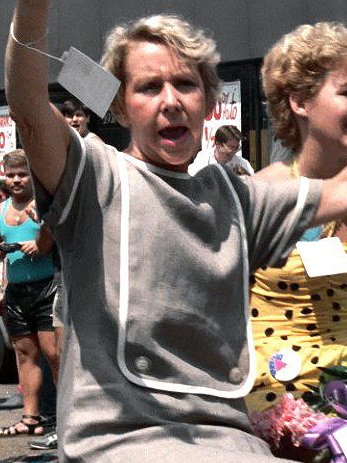
Mayor Jane Byrne

Since winning an upset victory in the 1979 Democratic primary and a landslide victory in that year's general election, Jane Byrne's mayoral tenure faced difficulties, including financial troubles, strikes by city workers, and high staff turnover.

Newspapers had speculated about a candidacy by Richard M. Daley, son of six-term mayor Richard J. Daley. From the start of her administration, Byrne recognized the threat posed by the younger Daley and sought to contain him. In the 1980 Cook County State's Attorney election, Byrne backed Ed Burke in the Democratic primary and later Republican Bernard Carey in the general election, both of whom were defeated by Daley. However, the younger Daley struggled with a perception that he was a lightweight compared to his father, though observers noted he began to shed the reputation after his father's death in 1976. Daley narrowly led Byrne in polls conducted throughout 1982.

There had long been speculation that a Black candidate for mayor would run, and professor Michael B. Preston wrote in 1982 that many Black voters had grown dissatisfied with the pre-existing political machine, though they would likely face challenges mobilizing the vote. Actions by Byrne, such as supporting a redistricting plan that reduced Black and Hispanic influence, and at various points, firing Black members of the city's Board of Education and Housing Authority and replacing them with white members, contributed to this dissatisfaction. Subsequently, Jesse Jackson would lead a boycott of 1982's ChicagoFest, which would serve as a catalyst for further Black mobilization.

Harold Washington had been the favorite among much of Chicago's African American community, and a movement to draft him was led by former journalist and community activist Lu Palmer. A poll by the Chicago Black United Communities (CBUC) found Washington to be the favorite among 10 prospective Black candidates. Washington initially did not accept any overtures to run. During a July 26, 1982, event in which prominent figures in the Black community intended to endorse his mayoral candidacy, Washington declared in his speech that the upcoming race was about "the plan, not the man." Moreover, Washington requested a guarantee that a prospective campaign would have adequate resources, including an increase in Black voter registration. Subsequently, activists registered more than 100,000 new voters, and with Daley and Byrne competing, there was a credible path for Washington.

== Democratic primary ==
=== Candidates ===
- Jane Byrne, incumbent mayor since 1979
- Richard M. Daley, Cook County State's Attorney
- Harold Washington, U.S. congressman, candidate for mayor in 1977

=== Declined ===
- Roman Pucinski, alderman for the 41st Ward, former U.S. Congressman
- William Singer, former alderman

=== Early campaign ===
Byrne officially announced her re-election bid on November 22, 1982. She campaigned on rehabilitating her image, accepting blame for past mistakes, but arguing she put the city on a better financial footing and was seasoned enough to lead it through turmoil. Byrne also attempted to portray herself as above the political fray, focusing on her administration's accomplishments.

Daley announced his campaign on November 4, 1982. He campaigned as a reform-minded candidate who sought a more transparent government. He also said that, if elected, he would call on the city council to adopt an ordinance making city records available to the public. Daley was critical of Byrne's leadership and attacked her over what he said were broken promises, including the fare increase on the CTA.

Washington announced that he would run for mayor on November 10, 1982, in Hyde Park. He campaigned against the city's political machine and promised to cut unnecessary patronage jobs to improve the city's finances. Additionally, Washington campaigned to mobilize Black voter support, arguing that it had been time for a Black mayor since Black voters had given white candidates votes for years with little to show for it.

Both Daley and Washington had strong regional support, with Daley receiving much support in the turnout-heavy Southwest Side neighborhoods, and Washington among Black voters in South Side neighborhoods. However, Byrne secured support for her re-nomination from 33 of the city's aldermen, while Daley and Washington split the remaining 17.

A voting bloc that candidates sought support from was the independent-leaning Democrats, often referred to as "lakefront liberals." They had backed Byrne in the 1979 primary, but were hesitant to back her again, feeling she had reneged on promises to implement reforms. These voters were divided between Daley, who won the support of prominent lakefront liberals such as Dawn Clark Netsch and Martin J. Oberman, and Washington, who won the support of the Independent Voters of Illinois-Independent Precinct Organization.

Washington had strong support from African American voters. However, he faced challenges in gaining white voters' support, as they were largely divided between Byrne and Daley. In contrast to Byrne and Daley, who received numerous white endorsements, including those from national figures such as Ted Kennedy and Walter Mondale, Washington was only endorsed by white elected officials representing predominantly Black districts. Washington's low name recognition led Byrne and Daley to avoid racially charged attacks, as they aimed to appeal to Black voters. Byrne held a lead with minority voters as late as January 1983. According to Professor William Grimshaw, Byrne and Washington primarily competed for Black voters, while Daley and Byrne vied for white voters' support.

Additionally, the city's Hispanic voters were noted as one of the fastest-growing voting blocs. Byrne polled well with Hispanic voters in a late January poll, while Daley benefited from residual memories of his father, and Washington was largely unknown in many Hispanic neighborhoods.

=== Debates ===
The three candidates met for four debates in January. Arrangements for the debates faced difficulties, as Daley had not initially committed to them, prompting Byrne and Washington to threaten to withdraw, and the Chicago Sun-Times canceled one debate. On January 13, 1983, the candidates agreed to four debates, held on January 18, January 24, January 27, and January 31. Professor Paul Green later wrote that during the debates, Byrne defended her record under pressure, Daley managed to dispel some of the notions about him, but Washington came off as a legitimate contender. Washington himself noted in an interview after the primary that he thought the debates helped him show off his experience to voters.

=== Closing weeks ===
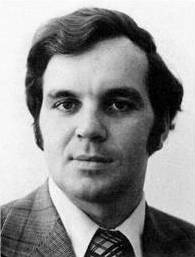
Richard M. Daley

In the aftermath of the debate, polling showed that Daley lost support among both white and Black voters. However, he won the endorsements of both of the city's major newspapers, the Chicago Tribune and the Chicago Sun-Times. The endorsements were critical of Byrne's tenure, helping revive Daley's campaign while halting Byrne's gains. Additionally, Washington's standing continued to improve. A campaign rally at the UIC Pavilion drew over 12,000 people, motivating the city's Black business community to donate more than $250,000 in the two weeks between the rally and election day. Washington was also endorsed by U.S. Senator and Democratic presidential candidate Alan Cranston, which legitimized Washington as a contender in the eyes of the Black community.

Cook County Democratic Party chairman Edward Vrdolyak was alleged to have encouraged voters to back Byrne, warning that a vote for Daley was a vote for Washington. The weekend of the primary, Vrdolyak told a group of precinct captains, "It's a racial thing. Don't kid yourself. I'm calling on you to save your city, to save your precinct. We’re fighting to keep the city the way it is." Reporters picked up the comments. Washington condemned the remarks, and Byrne attempted to avoid making race an issue.

In the closing days of the campaign, Byrne was defensive, particularly in response to attacks from Daley. Daley, meanwhile, was struggling to convince voters that he was no longer in third place.

=== Endorsements ===
Jane Byrne

Federal officials

- Ted Kennedy, U.S. Senator from Massachusetts

State officials

- Richard B. Ogilvie, former Governor of Illinois (Republican)
- Frank Savickas, member of the Illinois Senate from the 15th District
- William Shaw, member of the Illinois House of Representatives from the 34th District

Local officials

- Ed Kelly, General Superintendent of the Chicago Park District and 47th Ward Democratic Committeeman
- Michael Madigan, Speaker of the Illinois House of Representatives.
- Fred Roti, alderman for the 1st Ward
- Robert Shaw, alderman for the 9th Ward
- Edward Vrdolyak, alderman from the 10th Ward and chair of the Cook County Democratic Party

Newspapers and publications

- Jewish Sentinel
Richard M. Daley

Executive officials

- Walter Mondale, former Vice-President of the United States

Federal officials

- Dan Rostenkowski, U.S. Representative from IL-08
- Adlai Stevenson III, former U.S. Senator from Illinois, 1982 Democratic nominee for Governor of Illinois

State officials

- Neil Hartigan, Attorney General of Illinois and former Lieutenant Governor of Illinois
- Jeremiah E. Joyce, member of the Illinois Senate from the 14th District
- Dawn Clark Netsch, member of the Illinois Senate from the 13th District

Local officials

- John M. Daley, committeeman for the 18th Ward, Daley's cousin
- Thomas G. Lyons, committeeman for the 45th Ward, former member of the Illinois Senate from the 15th District
- Martin J. Oberman, alderman for the 43rd Ward

Newspapers and publications

- Chicago Sun-Times
- Chicago Tribune

Organizations

- Chicago Fire Fighters Union
Harold Washington

Federal officials

- Alan Cranston, U.S. Senator from California

State officials

- Larry Bloom, alderman from the 5th ward, Chicago
- Barbara Flynn Currie, member of the Illinois House of Representatives from the 24th district.
- Richard H. Newhouse Jr., member of the Illinois Senate from the 24th District

Individuals

- Albert Raby, activist and teacher
- Studs Terkel, author and radio show host

Newspapers and publications

- The Chicago Defender

Organizations

- Independent Voters of Illinois-Independent Precinct Organization
Declined to endorse

Local officials

- Ruth Love, Superintendent of Chicago Public Schools

Newspapers and publications

- Crain's Chicago Business

=== Results ===
Result map by ward

Result map by precinct

Washington received 36.3% of the citywide vote, including approximately 80% of the African American vote; Mayor Byrne had 33.6% of the citywide vote, and Daley came in third place with 29.7%. The election saw a record-setting 69% turnout among registered African American voters and 70% turnout among Hispanic voters.

Professor Paul Green would later say that Daley was not adequately prepared to run in 1983, lacking an efficient political organization, significant political experience, and a thorough understanding of the city's issues and demographics. Professor William J. Grimshaw pointed to Byrne's actions in office, particularly those opposed by the Black community, as a reason for her loss. Once Washington emerged, many Black ward organizers no longer had a reason to back her.

1983 Chicago Democratic Party Mayoral Primary
| Candidate | Votes | % | +/- |
|---|---|---|---|
| Harold Washington | 424,324 | 36.3% | N/A |
| Jane Byrne (incumbent) | 393,500 | 33.6% | -17.4% |
| Richard M. Daley | 346,835 | 29.7% | N/A |
| Frank R. Ranallo | 2,367 | 0.2% | N/A |
| William Markowski | 1,412 | 0.1% | N/A |
| Sheila Jones | 1,285 | 0.1% | N/A |
| Majority | 30,824 | 2.6% | +0.6% |
| Total | 1,169,723 | 100% | N/A |

=== Exit polls ===
According to an exit poll conducted by the Associated Press and WMAQ-TV, Byrne received 47% of the white vote, Daley received 46%, and Washington received 6%. Washington received 84% of the Black vote. Additionally, a March report said that Byrne received 51% of the Hispanic vote to Daley 35% and Washington 13%.

== Republican primary ==
=== Campaign ===
Former state Representative Bernard Epton won the Republican nomination. Epton reluctantly ran after being urged by party leaders, such as Governor James Thompson, who had personally called Epton and offered his gubernatorial campaign staff to help with a prospective mayoral candidacy. Epton was the only established figure who agreed to seek the nomination and effectively secured it at party meetings in November. He was viewed largely as a moderate figure and had previously marched in Memphis after the assassination of Martin Luther King Jr.

Chicago had not elected a Republican mayor in 56 years, and at the time, had no Republican aldermen on its City Council. While Chicago was regarded as overwhelmingly Democratic, many Republicans hoped that if the Democrats nominated Washington, white voters would be more likely to vote for the Republican nominee. Epton stated, "Chicago has been regarded for too long as a Democratic stronghold. It's about time we change that image." Epton was ultimately unopposed after candidates Ralph G. Medly, William Arthur Murray, and Raymond Wardingley had their names removed from the ballot due to petition issues. During the primary, Epton raised $41,000, almost entirely from self-donations and family donations.

== Independent candidates ==
Ed Warren ran as a candidate for the Socialist Workers Party. Warren was an unemployed garment worker who supported a 30-hour workweek and demanded that the federal government reallocate funds spent in Central America to Chicago. During the campaign, federal officials launched an investigation into allegations that a city official offered Warren $1 million and a city job to withdraw from the race and be replaced by a different candidate.

In November 1982, aldermen Roman Pucinski and Edward Burke both expressed interest in running an independent general election bid if Washington were the Democratic nominee. Both men ultimately ran for re-election.

== General election ==
=== Campaign ===
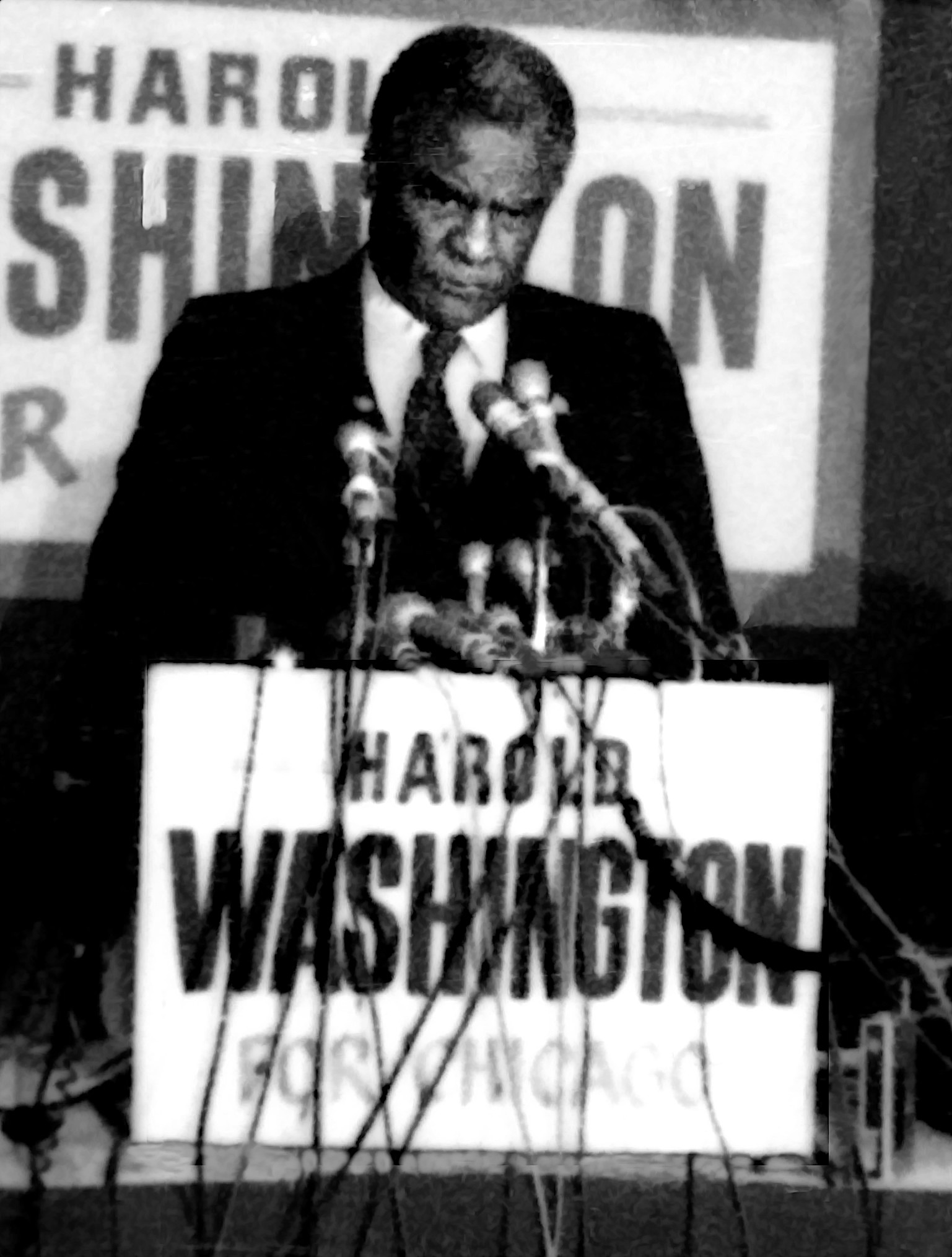
Washington holds a press conference at the Hyatt Regency Chicago on December 13, 1982.

As soon as Washington was declared the winner, political observers noted that his victory and the Democratic divide it created gave Epton a serious chance at becoming the city's first Republican mayor since William Hale Thompson in 1927. After Washington's primary victory, observers reported backlash from some white voters. In the following days, local Republican Party headquarters were filled with volunteers, and Epton's events began attracting people wearing bags with "Unknown Democrats for Epton" written on them.

Democratic Aldermen were reticent to support Washington. The first Alderman to endorse Epton was Aloysius Majerczyk, who said his constituents feared what would happen to their neighborhoods under a Washington administration. Edward Vrdolyak, chair of the Cook County Democratic Party, offered only tepid support for Washington, and according to an aide to Epton, maintained contact with the Epton campaign. Other white aldermen expressed disgruntlement, implicitly and explicitly. In addition to the issue of race, others, such as Vito Marzullo and Roman Pucinski, cited distaste for Washington's plans to end much of the city's patronage system and for his seeking the support of the party establishment despite having snubbed them in the primary.

Despite this, Epton promised not to make race an issue. He vowed not to make personal attacks and spoke highly of Washington, with whom he had served in the state legislature, and instead campaigned on improving city schools and the police force without raising taxes. James Fletcher, who ran Gov. James Thompson's first successful gubernatorial campaign, became Epton's general election campaign manager. High-profile figures such as Republican Senator Paul Laxalt (chairman of the RNC) campaigned for Epton.

Washington and his team opted to ignore the initial attacks under the idea that Chicago Republicans were essentially a non-factor. As the city was overwhelmingly Democratic, Washington campaigned on goals he intended to accomplish and generally focused on uniting the party for the general election. However, with time, this strategy would shift as much of the city's Democratic establishment refused to endorse Washington. Washington grew frustrated with the Democratic resistance and threatened to help defeat Democratic candidates in 1984 if the party officials did not support him.

On March 17, Byrne announced she was running as a write-in candidate, claiming that Epton and Washington were not the best candidates and did not have good plans for Chicago. Epton believed that Byrne's candidacy would hurt his campaign and help Washington. Washington was critical of her campaign, although he privately viewed it as helpful for his own candidacy. Byrne's candidacy faced resistance from Democratic aldermen, and Ted Kennedy personally visited her to persuade her to withdraw from the race. After being booed at a Southside nursing home, Byrne withdrew after only one week. In addition to a lack of support, Byrne had hoped to avoid a court battle with the Chicago Board of Elections over the simplification of write-in procedures.

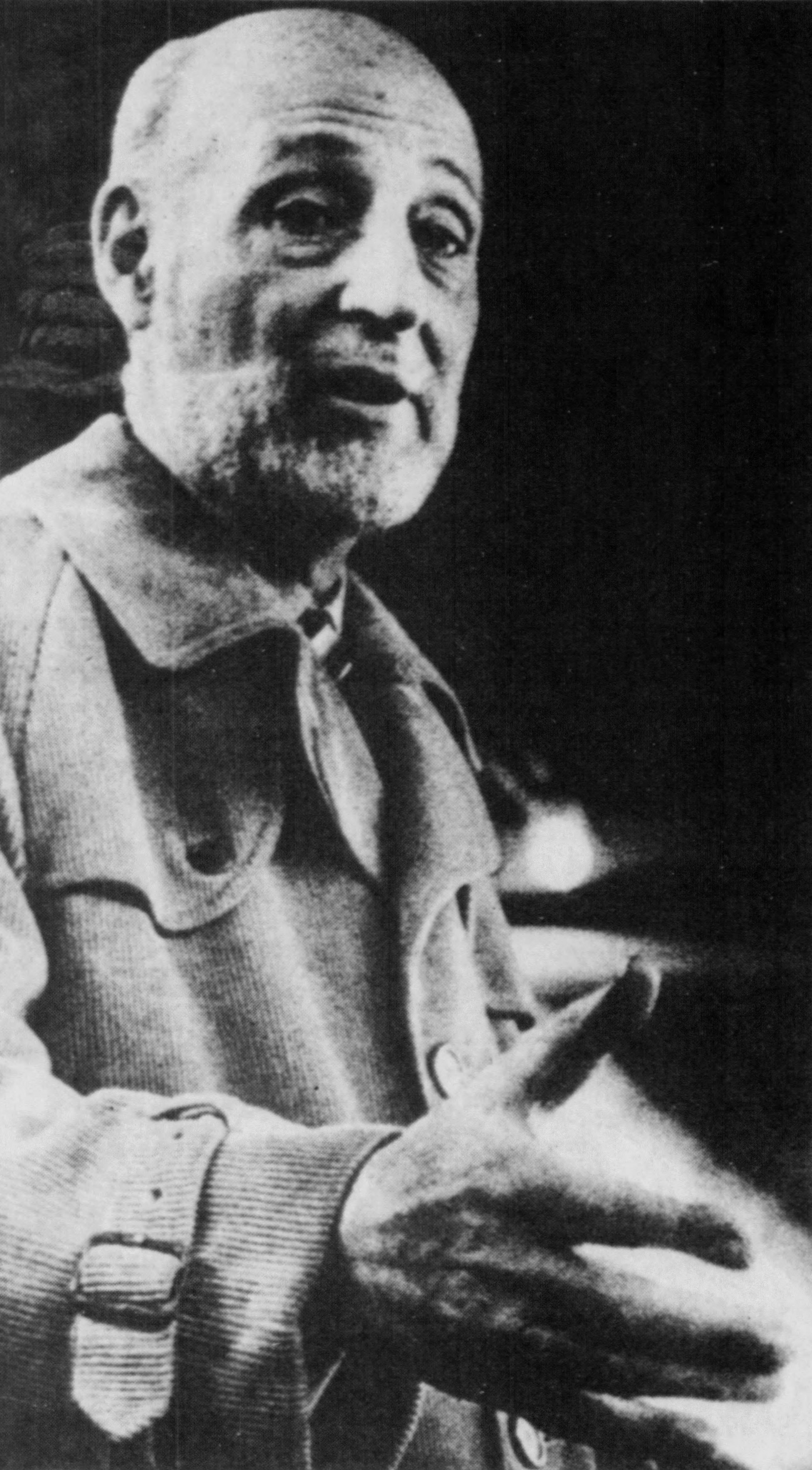
Bernard Epton during the campaign, March 6, 1983.

As the race went on, it became increasingly competitive, with the Chicago Sun-Times' Basil Talbott Jr. calling it a "tossup" and Epton polling double the amount typical of a Republican in Chicago mayoral races. The race also grew very bitter, as the last weeks of the campaign saw various attacks from Epton's campaign. Epton frequently referenced Washington's past legal troubles, including a failure to pay his taxes and a brief suspension of his law license. Epton's ads used the slogan "Epton- Before it's too late", which observers noted capitalized on the fears of white voters. Washington's campaign responded by referencing reports that Epton had been institutionalized multiple times for depression and attacked Epton's slogan for its racially tinged messaging.

A debate was held on March 21. During the debate, Epton pulled out a binder containing various civil lawsuits against Washington and attacked him for failing to pay his taxes and purportedly lying in a petition to regain his law license. Washington addressed the charges and also said that Epton supported Republican policies that opposed labor and that he would not provide property tax relief.

On March 27, protesters at the northwest side of St. Pascal's Catholic Church confronted Washington and former Vice President Walter Mondale. The incident received national attention, including a cover story in Newsweek titled "Chicago's Ugly Election". Subsequently, Washington's team made advertisements using footage of the protestors to highlight to white liberals the degree to which racism motivated the opposition to Washington. In the last days of the campaign, a flier circulated accusing Washington of being a child molester. Washington delivered a speech in response, criticizing Epton's character, which earned applause and cheers from a predominantly white audience.

==== Endorsements ====
Bernard Epton (R)

Federal officials

- Paul Laxalt, U.S. Senator from Nevada

State officials

- Jim Thompson, Governor of Illinois

Local officials

- Mathew Bieszczat, Democratic committeeman and former alderman
- Richard Clewis, alderman for the 45th district (Democratic)
- Ed Kelly, General Superintendent of the Chicago Park District and 47th Ward Democratic Committeeman
- Vito Marzullo, alderman for the 25th ward (Democratic)
- Gerald McLaughlin, alderman candidate for the 45th Ward (Democratic)
- Michael Nardulli, alderman for the 26th ward (Democratic)
- Roman Pucinski, alderman from the 41st Ward (Democratic)
- Ivan Rittenberg, alderman for the 40th ward (Democratic)
Harold Washington (D)

Federal officials

- Alan J. Dixon, U.S. Senator from Illinois
- John Glenn, U.S. Senator from Ohio
- Ted Kennedy, U.S. Senator from Massachusetts
- Tip O'Neill, Speaker of the United States House of Representatives
- Claude Pepper, U.S. Representative from Florida's 18th congressional district
- Adlai Stevenson III, former U.S. Senator from Illinois, 1982 Democratic nominee for Governor of Illinois

State officials

- Toney Anaya, Governor of New Mexico
- Richard M. Daley, Cook County State's Attorney and candidate for mayor
- Frank Damato, alderman for the 37th ward and Democratic committeeman
- Michael Holewinski, former member of the Illinois House of Representatives
- Dawn Clark Netsch, member of the Illinois Senate from the 13th District
- Martin J. Oberman, alderman for the 43rd ward

Local officials

- George Dunne, President of the Cook County Board of Commissioners
- Maurice Ferré, Mayor of Miami, Florida
- Edward Quigley, city sewer commissioner and Democratic ward committeeman
- Wilson Frost, alderman for the 34th ward

Newspapers and publications

- Chicago Sun-Times
- Chicago Tribune

Organizations

- Chicago Federation of Labor
- Cook County Democratic Party

=== Results ===
Mayor of Chicago 1983 (general election)
| Party | Candidate | Votes | % |
|---|---|---|---|
| Democratic | Harold Washington | 668,176 | 51.72 |
| Republican | Bernard Epton | 619,926 | 47.99 |
| Socialist Workers | Ed Warren | 3,756 | 0.29 |
| Turnout | | 1,291,858 | |

==== Results by ward ====
As Washington's coalition of voters consisted of the city's African American population, with additional support of "lakefront liberals" and the city's Latino community, he performed best in heavily Black and Hispanic wards while putting up adequate numbers in lakeshore wards. In Black wards, turnout was no lower than 73% and Washington garnered around 97% of the Black vote. He also received between 75% and 79% of the Hispanic vote. Epton performed strongest in white wards on the Northwest and Southwest side of the city, earning upwards of 90% of the vote in some.

Epton carried a plurality of the vote in 28 of the city's 50 wards, while Washington carried a plurality of the vote in 22 wards. Epton won the most wards for a Republican mayoral candidate since 1927.

| Ward | Harold Washington (Democratic Party) | | Bernard Epton (Republican Party) | | Ed Warren (Socialist Workers Party) | | Total |
| Ward | Votes | % | Votes | % | Votes | % | Votes |
|---|---|---|---|---|---|---|---|
| 1 | 13,026 | 62.4% | 7,777 | 37.3% | 65 | 0.3% | 20,868 |
| 2 | 22,738 | 97.4% | 558 | 2.4% | 42 | 0.2% | 23,338 |
| 3 | 24,470 | 99.1% | 178 | 0.7% | 48 | 0.2% | 24,696 |
| 4 | 24,420 | 92.3% | 1,981 | 7.5% | 70 | 0.3% | 26,471 |
| 5 | 24,729 | 90.8% | 2,455 | 9.0% | 45 | 0.2% | 27,229 |
| 6 | 34,727 | 99.2% | 240 | 0.7% | 43 | 0.1% | 35,010 |
| 7 | 17,293 | 81.9% | 3,771 | 17.9% | 45 | 0.2% | 21,109 |
| 8 | 31,095 | 98.5% | 457 | 1.4% | 28 | 0.1% | 31,580 |
| 9 | 23,979 | 93.9% | 1,518 | 5.9% | 29 | 0.1% | 25,526 |
| 10 | 10,103 | 33.9% | 19,609 | 65.8% | 94 | 0.3% | 29,806 |
| 11 | 7,186 | 25.8% | 20,515 | 73.8% | 98 | 0.4% | 27,799 |
| 12 | 3,836 | 15.4% | 21,042 | 84.2% | 99 | 0.4% | 24,977 |
| 13 | 1,457 | 4.0% | 34,856 | 95.7% | 100 | 0.3% | 36,413 |
| 14 | 3,864 | 16.1% | 20,095 | 83.5% | 94 | 0.4% | 24,053 |
| 15 | 15,949 | 60.3% | 10,451 | 39.5% | 62 | 0.2% | 26,462 |
| 16 | 25,646 | 98.9% | 221 | 0.9% | 56 | 0.2% | 25,923 |
| 17 | 29,233 | 99.1% | 205 | 0.7% | 53 | 0.2% | 29,491 |
| 18 | 14,889 | 43.7% | 19,081 | 56.0% | 79 | 0.2% | 34,049 |
| 19 | 7,045 | 20.0% | 28,072 | 79.7% | 105 | 0.3% | 35,222 |
| 20 | 25,701 | 99.0% | 220 | 0.8% | 40 | 0.2% | 25,961 |
| 21 | 32,967 | 99.1% | 275 | 0.8% | 32 | 0.1% | 33,274 |
| 22 | 4,674 | 51.9% | 4,279 | 47.5% | 46 | 0.5% | 8,999 |
| 23 | 1,373 | 4.1% | 32,399 | 95.6% | 101 | 0.3% | 33,873 |
| 24 | 24,259 | 99.2% | 129 | 0.5% | 63 | 0.3% | 24,451 |
| 25 | 5,925 | 49.1% | 6,099 | 50.5% | 51 | 0.4% | 12,075 |
| 26 | 7,449 | 45.5% | 8,823 | 53.9% | 96 | 0.6% | 16,368 |
| 27 | 20,706 | 92.7% | 1,577 | 7.1% | 58 | 0.3% | 22,341 |
| 28 | 22,335 | 98.6% | 224 | 1.0% | 103 | 0.5% | 22,662 |
| 29 | 19,882 | 92.7% | 1,530 | 7.1% | 43 | 0.2% | 21,455 |
| 30 | 3,033 | 12.6% | 20,947 | 87.1% | 72 | 0.3% | 24,052 |
| 31 | 9,856 | 60.4% | 6,396 | 39.2% | 77 | 0.5% | 16,329 |
| 32 | 8,266 | 43.8% | 10,515 | 55.7% | 98 | 0.5% | 18,879 |
| 33 | 6,909 | 37.7% | 11,296 | 61.7% | 101 | 0.6% | 18,306 |
| 34 | 29,354 | 98.8% | 336 | 1.1% | 32 | 0.1% | 29,722 |
| 35 | 3,412 | 15.4% | 18,647 | 84.2% | 85 | 0.4% | 22,144 |
| 36 | 1,647 | 4.9% | 31,944 | 94.8% | 95 | 0.3% | 33,686 |
| 37 | 17,549 | 76.8% | 5,251 | 23.0% | 57 | 0.2% | 22,857 |
| 38 | 1,881 | 5.7% | 30,939 | 94.0% | 100 | 0.3% | 32,920 |
| 39 | 3,127 | 12.3% | 22,159 | 87.3% | 92 | 0.4% | 25,378 |
| 40 | 3,772 | 17.1% | 18,202 | 82.5% | 91 | 0.4% | 22,065 |
| 41 | 2,380 | 6.8% | 32,725 | 93.0% | 75 | 0.2% | 35,180 |
| 42 | 12,496 | 45.5% | 14,891 | 54.2% | 67 | 0.2% | 27,454 |
| 43 | 11,006 | 35.8% | 19,618 | 63.9% | 93 | 0.3% | 30,717 |
| 44 | 10,613 | 39.2% | 16,372 | 60.4% | 105 | 0.4% | 27,090 |
| 45 | 2,376 | 6.9% | 31,737 | 92.8% | 91 | 0.3% | 34,204 |
| 46 | 10,251 | 46.8% | 11,542 | 52.7% | 108 | 0.5% | 21,901 |
| 47 | 4,515 | 18.0% | 20,397 | 81.5% | 125 | 0.5% | 25,037 |
| 48 | 9,433 | 43.3% | 12,269 | 56.3% | 88 | 0.4% | 21,790 |
| 49 | 9,719 | 42.9% | 12,815 | 56.6% | 109 | 0.5% | 22,643 |
| 50 | 5,001 | 18.2% | 22,368 | 81.4% | 103 | 0.4% | 27,472 |
| Totals | 667,552 | 51.7% | 620,003 | 48.0% | 3,752 | 0.3% | 1,291,307 |

== Aftermath ==
After his election, Washington held a unity luncheon with Byrne, Daley, and Epton's brother Saul. After his loss, Epton criticized the media for its coverage of his campaign, threatening to file lawsuits and complaints with the Federal Communications Commission, and went on vacation to Florida.

In the immediate aftermath of the election, Washington's victory was seen as potentially significant for state politics, as a sign of growing Black power but also of declining Democratic dominance among ethnic white voters. Additionally, Midwest Voter Registration Education Project executive director Juan Andrade Jr. said the election marked an increase in Hispanic political power in Chicago, as Hispanic voter registration increased, and that Hispanic voters made the difference for Washington. The DuSable Black History Museum cited Washington's election as an influence on future U.S. President Barack Obama, who stated that he moved to Chicago "in part because of the inspiration of Mayor Washington’s campaign."

Following his victory, opposition in the City Council solidified among 29 aldermen led by Edward Vrdolyak and Edward Burke, later referred to as the "Vrdolyak 29". Washington retained the support of 21 aldermen, including Eugene Sawyer and Bobby Rush. This period led to what was known as the "Council Wars," during which Washington faced challenges in enacting his agenda with the city council.

== Turnout ==
The city's Democratic and Republican primaries (held on February 22) saw high turnout, with 77.49% of registered voters voting. 1,235,324 ballots were returned by voters (1,217,965 in the Democratic primary, 14,641 ballots in the Republican primary, and 2,718 for third-party primaries). Most ballots were cast in person on election day at precinct polling places, though 22,483 ballots were cast absentee, and 1,822 were cast at nursing homes. The general election turnout was 82.07%, with 1,334,303 ballots cast. Though most ballots were cast in person at precinct polling places, 25,427 were absentee ballots, and 1,822 were cast at nursing homes.
