= Ed Kelly (Illinois politician, born 1924) =

American politician (born 1924)

General Superintendent of the Chicago Park District
- In office May 4, 1972 – July 1986
- Preceded by: Thomas C. Barry
- Succeeded by: Jesse Madison
- Mayor: Richard J. Daley; Michael Bilandic; Jane Byrne; Harold Washington

Personal details
- Born: August 19, 1924 (age 102) Chicago, Illinois, U.S.
- Party: Democratic

Military service
- Allegiance: United States
- Branch/service: United States Marine Corps
- Battles/wars: World War II

Edmund L. Kelly (born August 19, 1924) is an American politician who formerly served as General Superintendent of the Chicago Park District and 47th Ward Democratic Committeeman.

Before his park district and political career, Kelly had served as an aerial gunner in the United States Marine Corps, and played professional basketball with the NBA's Oshkosh All-Stars.

== Early life ==
Kelly was born August 19, 1924. Kelly grew up in a house located across from Seward Park at West Division and New Orleans Street on the Near North Side of Chicago. Kelly graduated from the all-boys St. Philip High School in 1942.

== Early career ==
Kelly served as an aerial gunner in the United States Marine Corps. Kelley played on the all-service basketball team, and won a serviceman welterweight boxing championship.

Kelley played professional basketball for the Oshkosh All-Stars of the NBA. His basketball career was ended by a knee injury.

Kelly began his career in the Chicago Park District in 1947 as a gym teacher at Welles Park. Kelly spent many years working in leadership roles for the Chicago Park District. He served a park board member as well as Assistant General Superintendent, serving in the latter role from 1969 through 1973. During this time, Kelly was involved in planning the first Special Olympics.

== General Superintendent of Chicago Park District ==
In 1972, Kelly was promoted to General Superintendent of the Chicago Park District, first serving as Acting Superintendent (and additionally retaining the title of Assistant Superintendent), until 1973 when he was permanently appointed by mayor Richard J. Daley as General Superintendent. He would hold this position until 1986. He had been named acting general superintendent immediately after the resignation of Thomas C. Barry as general superintendent on May 4, 1972. Kelly would later claim that, in accepting the role of General Superintendent in 1973, he turned down an offer from the NBA's Milwaukee Bucks owner Wesley Pavalon to serve as team's president.

Kelly became a strong promoter of Soldier Field, the lakefront stadium owned and operated by the Chicago Park District. He worked hard to attract events to the venue, and to retain it as a home of the Chicago Bears football team, who had recently moved in there on an interim basis. He reestablished the stadium as a venue for concerts, starting with a 1975 concert by Aretha Franklin. In the 1970s, there was talk of possibly building a new stadium to serve as a new home to the Chicago Bears, which would compete with and jeopardize Soldier Field. Kelly worked to instead push for a renovation of Soldier Field. He worked with mayor Richard J. Daley on plans to possibly renovate the stadium. By late, 1977, Daley had come to agree to support a $35 million to $50 million renovation that would have added an upper deck and hundreds of skyboxes to the stadium. However, on December 20, 1977, after earlier in the day having participated with Kelly in the opening of the new Park District field house, Daley died in office of a heart attack. Daley's successor Michael Bilandic again explored the idea of building a new stadium. Bilandic placed former governor Richard Ogilvie in charge of a task force to study the city's stadium situation, and Ogilvie proved to push for the task force to promote a new stadium over renovating Soldier Field. Kelly continued to work to promote plans for the renovation of Soldier Field, and got Bilandic to agree in 1978 to fund $3.5 million stopgap improvements of Soldier Field, including replacing the temporary seating in the north grandstand of the stadium with a permanent structure. When, in 1979, Jane Byrne was elected mayor, Kelly's push to renovate the stadium received a boon, as Byrne came to oppose building a new stadium, and came to support a $30 million plan to renovate the stadium. This renovation, which ultimately cost $32 million, was completed by 1982.

Kelly was known for his contributions to youth programs in the city, with a 1975 Chicago Tribune profile on him once declaring, "If Mayor Daley is the man who makes Chicago work, then Ed Kelly is the man who makes it play." Kelly also made heavy use of his office as a means of accruing political power through patronage hiring. In a 2014 interview with the Chicago Sun-Times, he reflected "When I became superintendent (in 1972), sure there was patronage. Absolutely."

When Kelly was approached by organizers of what would become the Chicago Marathon, he did not see value in the proposed event and refused to grant them use of the parks. The late Mayor Daley took an interest in the proposal, and Mayor Bilandic took an even greater interest. In 1977, Bilandic persuaded Kelly to support the event.

In 1982, a discrimination lawsuit was filed against the Chicago Park District which claimed that in Kelly's tenure they had neglected facilities in black and Hispanic neighborhoods while enhancing facilities and programs in white neighborhoods. A year later, while not admitting to discrimination, the Chicago Park District entered into a federal consent decree in which they agreed to spend more money in black and Hispanic neighborhoods.

Kelly got into disputes with the Friends of the Parks advocacy group, as well as mayor Harold Washington (who took office in 1983). Friends of the Parks and other civic groups urged Kelly to make reforms to the Park District. Also in 1986, Washington diminished Kelly's effective power by installing new park commissioners that were less friendly to Kelly. Among those Washington appointed was Walter Netsch, who was a constant critic of Kelly and had regularly pushed him for reform. After this, Kelly resigned his position as General Superintendent in July 1986.

== 47th Ward Democratic Committeeman ==
From 1968 through 2004, Kelly served as the 47th Ward Democratic Committeeman.

Kelly was elected committeeman in 1968. He had run for committeeman at the request of Mayor Daley. Kelly was considered the Democrat political boss of the ward.

Kelly built the ward's operation into one of the strongest Democratic ward operations in the city. In 1975, he recruited Eugene Schulter to run as the Democratic candidate for the ward. Schulter successfully unseated the ward's Republican longtime alderman John J. Hoellen Jr., a significant foe of Mayor Daley.

Kelly mixed his duty as committeeman with his duty as General Superintendent of the Chicago Park District, giving precinct workers with park district jobs (as patronage hires). By the mid-1980s, with the exception of the mayor, Kelly was considered to have the strongest patronage of Democratic Party leaders in the city.

After Mayor Daley's December 20, 1977 death, Kelley vigorously pushed become Daley's successor as chairman of the Cook County Democratic Party. However, on December 28 the county party's central commission instead voted 79–1 to appoint George Dunne (president of the Cook County Board of Commissioners).

In the 1983 Chicago mayoral election, Kelly endorsed incumbent mayor Jane Byrne in the Democratic primary. Kelly was the first Democratic Ward Committeeman to endorse Republican Bernard Epton over Democratic nominee Harold Washington in the general election.

In the 1987 Chicago mayoral election, he endorsed Chicago First nominee Thomas Hynes, who ultimately withdrew two days before the election.

In 2000, Eugene Schulter made an attempt to challenge Kelly for the 47th Ward committemanship. Kelly narrowly defeated him in the election. In retaliation, for the ward's 2003 aldermanic election, Kelly backed John "Jack" Lydon's unsuccessful attempt to unseat Schulter.

In late-2003, Kelly announce that he would be retiring as the ward's committeeman. Schulter was elected in 2004 to succeed him as the ward's committeeman.

== Possible pursuit of higher office ==
In 1986, Kelly had been encouraged by some to run for the chairmanship of the Cook County Democratic Party, but he declined to challenge Edward Vrdolyak, the incumbent chairman who was seeking reelection to the position, and with whom Kelly was friendly.

A powerful figure in Chicago politics, it had been speculated that he might run for mayor. He had considered running in the mid-1980s. When he resigned from his position as general superintendent of the Chicago Park District, he vowed to "get even" with mayor Washington in 1987. He considered a possible run in the 1987 mayoral election. He had made plans to run in the 1989 mayoral special election, considering both the possibility of seeking the Republican and Democratic nominations, before opting to make plans to seek the Democratic nomination. He ultimately did not run, however.

== Later life and career ==
After stepping down as committeeman, Kelly entered the field of advertising.

In 2014, Kelly gave an interview to the Chicago Sun-Times where he criticized Rahm Emanuel (the then-incumbent mayor of Chicago) as "a suburbanite" and "not a Chicago guy".

Kelly was inducted into the National Italian American Sports Hall of Fame in December 2023.
