= Donald Haider =

American business professor and politician

Personal details
- Party: Republican
- Other political affiliations: Democratic
- Spouse: Jean
- Education: Stanford University (B.A.); Columbia University (M.A. and PhD)
- Profession: Business professor

Donald H. Haider is an American business professor and politician. He has long been a business professor at Northwestern University's Kellogg School of Management. He ran in 1987 as a Republican nominee for mayor of Chicago (despite having been a longtime Democrat beforehand).

== Early life and education ==
Haider was born in either 1944 or 1945. Haider was raised in the northern suburbs of Chicago.

He graduated Stanford University in 1964 with a Bachelor of Arts. He graduated Columbia University in 1967 with a Master of Arts. He graduated from Columbia again in 1973 with a PhD in political science.

== Business and finance career ==
Haider has served on the corporate boards of Asset Acceptance Capital Corp, Continental Waste Industries, Covenant Mutual Insurance, Evanston National Bank, Fender Musical Instruments, InterAccess, LaSalle National Bank Corp, National Can, Talman Home Savings, and Westchester Insurance.

Haider has been considered a property finance expert.

In March 2016, he was elected a Fellow of the Business Excellence Institute.

== Professorial career ==
Haider first taught at Columbia University.

In 1973, Haider left Columbia University and began working as a business professor at Northwestern University's Kellogg School of Management. For most of the next four decades, he would teach there as a professor of strategy.

Haider served as head of the school's public management program.

He has served as director of the Kellogg School Center for Nonprofit Management until 2016. He had played a part in establishing it.

He retired from teaching full-time in late 2016. He was made an emeritus Professor in 2017.

== Political career ==
Haider was a congressional fellow from 1967 to 1968. He worked in the office of United States senator Ted Kennedy.

After working as a congressional fellow, Haider worked at a guest scholar at the Brookings Institution.

Haider was a White House fellow from 1976 to 1977. He is the only academic to serve both as a White House fellow and congressional fellow.

During the presidencies of Gerald Ford and Jimmy Carter, he worked an assistant to three different directors of the Office of Management and Budget. In this role, he was assigned to refinance New York City, which was facing a potential bankruptcy amid a financial crisis in the city.

Until 1986, Haider was a longtime member of the Democratic Party.

Haider had worked as an advisor to Richard J. Daley during his mayoralty. Haider also worked as the Chicago city budget director (chief financial officer for the City of Chicago) under Jane Byrne from 1979 until 1980.

Haider served as deputy assistant secretary of the United States Treasury.

Haider has also served as vice chairman of the Chicago School Finance Authority for fifteen years, during which time he helped refinance the schools.

Haider, in 2008, served on the president of the Cook County Board of Commissioners' task force on property tax classification.

Haider served as an alternate delegate to the 2012 Republican National Convention, pledged to Mitt Romney.

=== 1987 Chicago mayoral campaign ===
In 1987, Haider won the Republican mayoral primary, making him the party's nominee for mayor. Haider had, previous to running for the Republican Party's mayoral nomination, been a Democrat. The fifth overall mayoral candidate to be a resident of Edgewater, Haider would have been the third mayor from Edgewater if he were elected (and the first since Martin H. Kennelly). Ahead of the primary, Haider was endorsed by the city's Republican Party organization on December 4, 1986. He had narrowly defeated 1983 nominee Bernard Epton for the endorsement. The search committee to find a candidate for the Republican Party to endorse had been chaired by Dan K. Webb. After receiving the party's endorsement on December 2, 1985, he formally launched his campaign on December 3. Despite the party organization having already endorsing Haider, both Epton and Democratic state senator Jeremiah E. Joyce indicated their intentions to challenge Haider in the Republican primary. Neither ultimately ran. Instead, he was challenged by Kenneth Hurst, Chester Hornowski, and Ray Wardingley. Haider won the party's nomination in the Republican primary.

His candidacy was seen as a long shot. However, Republican leaders initially hoped that the 1986 election of Republican James O'Grady as Cook County sheriff was a sign that a Republican might be able to perform well in the 1987 mayoral election. They hoped that a strong performance by Haider would assist the party in getting a Republican affiliated candidate elected Chicago alderman for the first time in twelve years. Republican Party leaders considered him the party's most qualified mayoral candidate they had put forth in a long while. However, a March 1987 poll showed that very few of those that had voted for 1983 Republican nominee Bernard Epton in the last election were intending to vote for Haider the 1987 election. Part of this was attributed to there being two other white challengers against Harold Washington: Edward Vrdolyak and Thomas Hynes. He also lagged in fundraising, with those opposed to Washington donating mostly to the other two challengers' campaigns, and with Republican Party members more focused on donating to presidential campaigns, as the race for the 1984 Republican Party presidential primaries had already begun. His fundraising severely lagged behind the other campaigns. Hynes withdrew from the race just before the general election, but this did not help Haider's performance.

During the campaign, in a desperate bid for press, Haider rode an elephant (an animal often used to symbolize the Republican Party) down State Street.

In the general election he placed last out of the three candidates in the general election, only garnering 4.3% of the vote.

=== Consideration of a prospective 1994 county president candidacy ===
There had been hope by county Republicans that Haider might run for president of the Cook County Board of Commissioners in 1994, believing he could perhaps stand a chance of winning the open-seat race for the office. A prospective Haider candidacy had amassed consensus support amongst the leadership in the Cook County Republican Party to be slated (endorsed by the party organization ahead of the primary) for the post. However, Haider declined to seek the office, citing concerns about his ability to secure adequate funds for a campaign in light of the lack of funding his mayoral bid had received, as well as concerns that he might face challenges in being granted a leave of absence from his professorial post at Northwestern in order to campaign. He also cited a personal lack of interest in campaigning for the office as a principal motivating factor in his decision not to run, remarking, "I just didn't have the fire in my belly".

== Nonprofit work ==
Haider has been on the boards of the Midtown Educational Foundation, Chicago Catholic Charities, and the U.S. Rugby Foundation.

== Rugby ==
Haider has long been involved in the sport of rugby. In 2018, he was inducted into the United States Rugby Hall of Fame. He played rugby while at Stanford University, and continued playing and coaching rugby throughout his adulthood.

== Personal life ==
In 2017, Haider was widowed when his wife Jean died. Jean Wright Haider was an author who had been president of the Chicago History Museum and a board member of the Chicago Lyric Opera.

== Awards ==
- Martha Derthick 2012 Best Book Award on federalism and intergovernmental relations (for "When Governments Come to Washington")
- 2018 United States Rugby Hall of Fame inductee
- Chicago Midtown Education Foundation's "Reach for Excellence Award" (with Jean Haider)
- Business Excellence Hall of Fame inductee in 2017

== Works authored ==
Haider has authored around 50 scholarly articles and in excess of 100 newspaper columns. He has also co-authored a multitude books. Many of his books were co-authored with Philip Kotler and Irving J. Rein.

Select articles

- Haider, Donald (September 1971). "The Political Economy of Decentralization". American Behavioral Scientist. 15 (1): 108–129. doi:10.1177/000276427101500107. S2CID 144730797.
- Haider, Donald (January 1, 1975). "A rank order of eateries: A chicago stochastic model". PS: Political Science & Politics. 7 (2): 165–174. doi:10.1017/S1049096500011094. S2CID 155529613.
- Haider, Donald (January 1, 1976). "Chicago—the city that works". PS: Political Science & Politics. 9 (2): 172–174. doi:10.1017/S104909650001369X. S2CID 155855719.
- Haider, Donald (January 1, 1979). "Sayre and Kaufman Revisited: New York City Government Since 1965". Urban Affairs Review. 15 (2): 123–145. doi:10.1177/107808747901500201. S2CID 145006582.
- Haider, Donald H. (June 1, 1981). "Balancing the federal budget: The intergovernmental casualty and opportunity". Publius. 11 (3): 21–38.
- Haider, Donald H. (January 1, 1983). "Intergovernmental Redirection". The Annals of the American Academy of Political and Social Science. 466 (1): 165–178. doi:10.1177/0002716283466001011. PMID 10260626. S2CID 21364798.
- Haider, Donald. (May 9, 1985). "CHICAGO`S POST-DALEY DRIFT". Chicago Tribune
- Haider, Donald (January 1, 1986). "Economic development: changing practices in a changing US economy". Environment and Planning C: Government and Policy. 4 (4): 451–469. doi:10.1068/c040451. S2CID 153425347.
- Haider, Donald (January 1, 1992). "Place Wars: New Realities of the 1990s". Economic Development Quarterly. 6 (2): 127–134. doi:10.1177/089124249200600202. S2CID 154290870.
- Haider, Donald; Rein, Irving; Kotler, Philip (1993). "There's no place like our place! The marketing of cities, regions, and nations". Futurist. 27: 14–21.
- Haider, Donald; Rein, Irving; Kotler, Philip (February 1994). "There's No Place Like our Place! The Marketing of Cities". Public Management. 76.
- Haider, Donald (1 January 1996). "The United States-Japan Gateway Awards Case of 1990: International Competition and Regulatory Theory". Public Administration Review. 56 (1): 9–20. doi:10.2307/3110049. JSTOR 3110049.
- Haider, Donald (2004). "Common Bonds: A Merger of Not-Quite Equals". Stanford Social Innovation Review. 2 (2).
- Haider, Donald (2006-01-01). "Cancer Health Alliance of Metropolitan Chicago: Working Together to Achieve Mutual Goals". Kellogg School of Management Cases: 1–8. doi:10.1108/case.kellogg.2016.000052. ISSN 2474-6568.
- Haider, Donald (2007). "Uniting for Survival; How Nonprofits Partner". Stanford Social Innovation Review.
- Haider, Don (April 29, 2010). "Why you might sit down for this bill". Chicago Tribune.
- Haider, Donald (July 10, 2010). "OpEd: Chicago Public Schools bailout offers Springfield a lesson in 'parental guidance'". Crain's Chicago Business.
- Haider, Donald; Wohlgezogen, Franz (2012). "Change Comes at a Cost". Stanford Social Innovation Review. 10 (1).
- Haider, Donald (2013). "Eight Implications of a Detroit Bankruptcy". Kellogg Insight Blog.
- Haider, Donald (2013). "As Detroit Goes, So Goes Your Local School District". Kellogg Insight Blog.

Books

- Haider, Donald H. (June 1, 1971). When Governments Come to Washington: Governors, Mayors, and Intergovernmental Lobbying. ISBN 002913370X.
- Marketing Places: Attracting Investment, Industry and Tourism to Cities, States, and Nations. The Free Press. 1993. (with Philip Kotler, Irving Reinn)
- Marketing Places Europe: How to Attract Investments, Industries, Residents and Visitors to Cities, Communities, Regions and Nations in Europe. Financial Times Management/Prentice Hall. 1999. ISBN 0273644424. (with Christer Asplund, Philip Kotler, Irving Reinn)
- Marketing Asian Places: Attracting Investment, Industry, and Tourism to Cities, States and Nations. John Wiley & Sons. 2001. ISBN 0471479136. (with Michael Allen Hamlin, Philip Kotler, Irving Rein)
- Marketing Latin American and Caribbean Places. Pearson Brazil. 2004. (with David Gertner, Philip Kotler, Irving Rein)
