= Frank Savickas =

American politician (1935–2001)

Member of the Illinois Senate from the 15th district 27th district (1971-1982)
- In office January 1971 – January 1993
- Preceded by: John J. Lanigan
- Succeeded by: Bill Shaw

Personal details
- Born: May 14, 1935 Chicago, Illinois
- Died: May 14, 2001 (aged 66) Venice, Florida
- Party: Democratic
- Children: Three children
- Profession: Insurance Broker

Frank D. Savickas (May 14, 1935 – May 14, 2001) was an American politician who served in the Illinois General Assembly from 1967 to 1993.

== Early life ==
Savickas was born in Chicago, Illinois on May 14, 1935. He attended St. Rita and Harper High School. He went on to attend Wilson Junior College where he majored in business administration. He was the owner of Frank Savickas Insurance Agency. In 1966, he was elected to the Illinois House of Representatives as a Democrat. He was the first Lithuanian-American elected to the Illinois General Assembly.

== Political career ==
=== Illinois Senate ===
In 1970, he defeated three term incumbent Senator John J. Lanigan in the Democratic wave of 1970, which saw Democrats take control of the Illinois Senate. He served in the Illinois Senate until his retirement in 1992. During his Senate tenure, he represented various areas of the southwest side of Chicago and the south suburbs including the Chicago neighborhoods of Marquette Park, Garfield Ridge and the suburb of Burbank. As a Senator, Savickas was an ally of the disability rights movement and pushed for proposals including special funding for handicapped children, various senior services and the legislation which gave the disabled guaranteed access to public education. He was an advocate for Midway International Airport and an ally of Mayor Richard J. Daley. During his second term in the Illinois Senate, Savickas was appointed Executive Secretary of the Chicago Park District.

He eventually rose to serve as Assistant Majority Leader under Philip J. Rock. During the 86th General Assembly, Savickas abstained from voting to reelect Rock as President of the Illinois Senate. Subsequently, he was stripped of his leadership position in the Democratic caucus. To protest the loss of his position, he and his longtime ally Jeremiah E. Joyce joined the Republican caucus under Pate Philip. This gave the Republicans a majority to hold up the business of the Senate. The stalemate ended when Savickas was given a newly created leadership position. The key Republican proposals during the stalemate, the repeal of the three fifths rule and the removal of Howard W. Carroll from the Appropriations Committee, were rejected.

In the Republican-controlled 1990 redistricting, Savickas, along with Jeremiah E. Joyce and Howard B. Brookins Sr., was drawn into the new 15th district. Under this map, the 15th became a minority-majority district. Savickas opted to establish residency in the neighboring 11th district. However, after Gary LaPaille, the chairman of the Illinois Democratic Party, announced his candidacy for the Democratic nomination in the 11th district, Savickas chose to retire.

He was succeeded in the 15th by State Representative Bill Shaw while LaPaille was elected in the 11th district.

=== Democratic Committeeman ===
In 1974, he was elected the Democratic Committeeman for Chicago's 15th ward. As Committeeman, he endorsed Jane Byrne in the 1983 Democratic primary for Mayor of Chicago. In his majority African-American ward Byrne lost to Harold Washington with the vote going strictly down racial lines. In 1986, he quietly stepped down as Democratic Committeeman for the 15th ward, as he likely would have lost reelection in the now-African American majority ward.

== Personal life ==
He and his wife Adrienne Savickas, nee Shenoha, had three children, Michael, Linda and Sharon. Adrienne left him in 1963, and she later passed away in 1971 at age 35. Savickas then went on to marry JoAnne Cortez twice, and both marriages ended in divorce, with no children born of the unions. In 1986, he would later marry Pamela Blasco. This marriage also produced no children.

In 1990, his son Michael ("Big Roach") Savickas was convicted in the killing of Thomas Vinnicky and sentenced to twenty eight years in prison.

After retiring, he moved to Venice, Florida where he died on his 66th birthday.
