= Michael Holewinski =

American politician, lawyer, and businessman (1947–2017)

Michael S. Holewinski (April 30, 1947 – June 19, 2017) was an American politician, lawyer, and businessman.

Holewinski was born in Chicago, Illinois and went to the Lane Technical High School. He served in the United States Army as a military police officer. He went to University of Illinois at Chicago and John Marshall Law School. He was admitted to the Illinois bar and practiced law in Chicago. Holewinski was also involved with the family manufacturing business and was an associate buyer for Montgomery Ward. Hoewimski served in the Illinois House of Representatives from 1975 to 1979 and was a Democrat. In the 1978 Democratic primary, Holewinski finished third for two spots behind incumbent Ted Lechowicz and former Representative John Leon.

After his primary loss, Holewinski announced that he would run for Chicago City Council in the 45th ward to succeed the retiring Edwin Fifielski. The runoff election pitted Holewinski against outgoing State Senator Richard Clewis who had also been bested in the 1978 primary. Clewis, the "machine" candidate, defeated Holewinski in the runoff election. Between his time in the House and his aldermanic campaign he served as the chairman of the liberal Committee on Illinois Government. Holewinski served as deputy campaign director for the presidential campaign of Jimmy Carter in the 1980 election.

In the 1983 Chicago mayoral election, Holewinski was a rarity as an ethnic white in the Bungalow belt who supported Harold Washington. Upon taking office, Washington hired Holewinski to serve on his staff. After Washington's death, Holewinski stayed with the administration of Eugene Sawyer before leaving to work with his family's manufacturing business.

In 2011, Governor Pat Quinn appointed Holewinski to the Illinois Gaming Board. Holewinski died June 19, 2017.
