= 1980 Cook County State's Attorney election =

- November 4, 1980
- Turnout: 76.77%
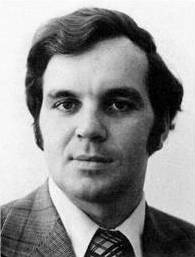

Candidate	Richard M. Daley	Bernard Carey
Party	Democratic	Republican
Popular vote	1,058,529	1,042,287
Percentage	50.39%	49.61%
State's Attorney before election
Bernard Carey
Republican
Elected State's Attorney
Richard M. Daley
Democratic

In the 1980 Cook County State's Attorney election, incumbent second-term state's attorney Bernard Carey, a Republican, was unseated by Democrat Richard M. Daley.

== Election information ==
The election was part of the 1980 Cook County, Illinois elections.

1980 was a presidential election year in the United States. The primaries and general elections for Cook County races coincided with those for federal races (President, Senate, and House) and those for state elections.

== Democratic primary ==
=== Candidates ===
The following candidates ran for the Democratic Party nomination for State's Attorney:

Candidate	Experience
Edward M. Burke	Chicago alderman since 1969
Richard M. Daley	Illinois state senator since 1972

=== Endorsements ===
Edward M. Burke

Organizations

- Cook County Democratic Central Committee

Officeholders

- Jane Byrne, mayor of Chicago
- Michael Madigan, member of the Illinois House of Representatives
Richard M. Daley

Officeholders

- Thomas Hynes, Cook County assessor and 19th ward Committeeman

=== Campaign ===
Daley ran as an "independent" Democrat, rather than pursuing the support of the local political machine. Daley's campaign was managed by his brother William M. Daley.

Burke aligned himself with Chicago mayor Jane Byrne, and was endorsed by the Cook County Democratic Central Committee. Burke ran at Byrne's urging, as she wanted to prevent Daley from becoming State's Attorney, since she saw him as a likely mayoral challenger in 1983.

Burke's loss to Daley was seen at the time as a setback for Chicago's political machine. This was also seen as a bad sign for Byrne, as the prospect of Daley being elevated to Cook County State's Attorney was problematic to her reelection chances, since he was seen as likely to challenge her for reelection in 1983 (and ultimately would).

=== Results ===
Cook County State’s Attorney Democratic primary
Party	Candidate	Votes	%
Democratic	Richard M. Daley	436,089	62.63
Democratic	Edward M. Burke	260,266	37.38
Total votes		696,355	100

== General election ==
=== Campaign ===
While the Cook County Democratic Party organization got behind Daley's candidacy once he won the party's primary, Chicago mayor Byrne continued to attempt to undermine the candidacy of her potential 1983 mayoral challenger. She raised questions of his mental state, accused him of being racist, and even succeeded in getting several ward committeemen to oppose Daley's candidacy. Byrne publicly supported Carey over Daley. Due to her heavy-handed intervention in the campaign, many voters in the city and county viewed the race as a proxy-referendum on mayor Byrne, and cast votes for Daley in order to voice their disapproval of her mayoralty. The feud between Daley and Byrne overshadowed most other aspects of the campaign.

Daley was successful in organizing with the Cook County Democratic Party across the county, including its suburbs. He also continued to benefit from the Daley name, still popular in much of Chicago.

Chicago Sun-Times columns by Mike Royko which attacked Carey may have harmed his performance in the election.

Some of Carey's harsh attacks on Daley may have backfired, offending voters more than persuading them. These included an ad he ran early in the campaign which went as far as to accuse some of Daley's brothers-in-law of being connected to organized crime.

Daley denied rumors that he had plans to seek the mayoralty of Chicago. He promised that he intended to serve a full four-year term if elected state's attorney.

While he had a clean record, Carey had also failed to make many waves while in office.

A key argument for Carey's past candidacies had been his opposition to the Democratic political machine. With Byrne and some on the Cook County Democratic Party Central Committee effectively supporting Carey over Daley, this argument was no longer persuasive.

Carey criticized Daley as being under-qualified for the office, arguing, "Even his father wouldn't have slated him for this office, because he isn't qualified. He's a ward committeeman, and Mayor Daley never slated someone like that for the prosecutor's job. He knew the people wouldn't buy it."

=== Results ===
Cook County State’s Attorney election
Party	Candidate	Votes	%
Democratic	Richard M. Daley	1,058,529	50.39
Republican	Bernard Carey (incumbent)	1,042,287	49.61
Total votes		2,100,816	100
