= Aloysius Majerczyk =

American politician (died 1996)

Aloysius Majerczyk (died January 19, 1996) was an American politician who served on the Chicago City Council from 1979 until 1987.

Majerczyk served in the United States Marine Corps during the Korean War. In 1959 he founded Standard Glass Co. and became a Chicago police officer. He resided in Brighton Park.

After two unsuccessful runs for Alderman, Majerczyk was elected in the 1979 election defeating incumbent George Kwak. Majerczyk was the first Alderman to explicitly come out in favor of Republican candidate Bernard Epton in the 1983 Chicago mayoral election. In a common trend in Chicago's ethnic white wards, Epton took a commanding 84% of the vote in the 12th ward. After the inauguration of Washington, Majerczyk continued his opposition to Washington during a vote on the reorganization of the City Council. Ultimately, Ed Vrdolyak assumed leadership of the anti-Washington aldermen, including Majerczyk, who would be known as the Vrdolyak 29. In the 1987 election, he lost to Mark Fary, the nephew of former Congressman John G. Fary.

After his 1987 loss, he made several efforts at a political comeback. In the 1988 United States House of Representatives elections, he ran for the Republican nomination in Illinois's 5th congressional district losing to John Holowinski. In 1990, he ran for the Illinois House of Representatives in the Democratic primary finishing third to winner Daniel J. Burke and incumbent Robert Krska. In 1991, he ran for his old City Council seat. In the 1992 United States House of Representatives elections, he ran in the Democratic primary and finished a distant third behind incumbents Bill Lipinski and Marty Russo. In the 1994 election for President of the Cook County Board of Commissioners he ran, ironically, as the nominee of the Harold Washington Party.

Majerczyk died on January 19, 1996, at Hines Veterans Administration Hospital after a stroke that happened the prior month.
