= Irving J. Rein =

American academic

Irving Jacob Rein

Academic background
- Education: Arizona State University

Academic work
- Discipline: Communication studies

Irving Jacob Rein is a professor of Communication Studies at Northwestern University. He is the author of many books on effective communication strategies and marketing.

Over the course of his career, Rein has researched, taught, and published in the areas of popular culture, crisis management, communication in sports and place marketing. As a member of the Northwestern community he has inspired many students’ love of popular culture. Before beginning his successful career, Rein received a B.A. and a B.S. from the University of Minnesota. After completing his undergraduate studies at Minnesota, Rein took a teaching job at Coronado High School from 1960 to 1962 before entering graduate school, receiving a M.A. from Arizona State University and a Ph.D from the University of Pittsburgh. Rein currently resides in Winnetka, Illinois, and enjoys spending time with his two children and two grandchildren.

As a faculty member at Harvard University from 1965 to 1969, Rein was director of the public speaking program, where he taught students such as Al Gore, Lou Dobbs, William Weld, and Tommy Lee Jones. Rein soon moved back to the Midwest and began teaching at Northwestern in 1969. In his time at Northwestern, he co-founded the Northwestern Master of Science in Communication program (MSC) with Professor Paul Arnston, which was the first professional Communications Master’s degree for executives. Additionally, he has been able to continually pursue his love of athletics, as a member of the Advisory Board for Northwestern University’s Master of Arts in Sports Administration, serving on Major League Baseball’s Commissioners’ Initiative for the 21st Century, and being the chairman of the MLB’s Youth Initiative.

Irving Rein also had a successful career in many diverse fields as a consultant, bringing those experiences back to the classroom. As a part of NASA’s astronaut training program for sixteen years, he conducted Public Communication Seminars and was responsible for developing the in-space communication program, which included teaching in space, press conferences and appearances in the media. In the political sphere, he served as a communication advisor for such campaigns as Richard M. Daley, Adlai Stevenson III, Michael Howlett, Jr., Harold Washington, Paul Simon, Neal Hartigan and Lisa Madigan. Rein has also been a communication consultant to many companies and organizations, including IBM, Mott’s, Ernst & Young, Internal Revenue Service, Honeywell, Motorola, and the Attorneys’ Liability Assurance Society (ALAS). Both within the U.S. and internationally, Rein has traveled and served as a consultant to cities, states, and nations including Norway, Sweden, Portugal, Argentina and Panama.

Rein has written many academic articles and convention papers, as well as authoring and co-authoring 13 books. The first of which was The Relevant Rhetoric in 1969, and the most recent of which were the Sports Strategist: Developing leaders for a High-Performance Industry, The Elusive Fan: Reinventing Sports in a Crowded Marketplace and High Visibility: Transforming Your Personal and Professional Brand. In 1993, he joined with Philip Kotler and Donald Haider to write about place marketing. In 2006, Rein and Kotler worked with Ben Shields to examine modern sports marketing and communication in The Elusive Fan: Reinventing Sports in a Crowded Marketplace. In 2015, Rein and Shields partnered with Adam Grossman to analyze the future of leadership in the sports industry with "The Sports Strategist: Developing Leaders for a High-Performance Industry". He is a pioneer in the study of persuasion and influence in popular culture, teaching courses on the subject at Northwestern beginning in the 1960s. He has also written on rhetoric and public communication, celebrity and branding, and crisis management. He was a recipient of the National Speakers Association's Outstanding Professor Award for 1999–2000, and in 2011, received the Clarence Simon Award for Outstanding Teaching and Mentoring in the School of Communication.

== Books ==
- The Relevant Rhetoric, The Free Press, 1969
- Rudy’s Red Wagon: Communication Strategies in Contemporary Society, Scott, Foresman, 1972
- The Great American Communication Catalogue, Prentice‑Hall, 1976
- The Public Speaking Book, Scott, Foresman, 1981
- High Visibility (with Philip Kotler and Martin Stoller), Dodd‑Mead, 1987
- Marketing Places: Attracting Investment, Industry, and Tourism to Cities, States, and Nations, with Philip Kotler and Donald Haider, The Free Press, March, 1993, paperback edition, 2002
- High Visibility: The Making and Marketing of Professionals into Celebrities, 2nd edition, with Philip Kotler and Martin Stoller, NTC/Contemporary Publishing Company, 1997
- Marketing Places Europe, with Philip Kotler, Christer Asplund, and Donald Haider, Financial Times Prentice Hall, 1999
- Marketing Asian Places, with Philip Kotler, Michael Alan Hamlin, and Donald Haider, John Wiley, 2002
- Marketing Latin American and Caribbean Places, with Philip Kotler, David Gertner, and Donald Haider, Pearson Brazil, 2006
- High Visibility: Transforming Your Personal and Professional Brand, 3rd edition, with Philip Kotler, Michael Hamlin, and Martin Stoller, McGraw-Hill, 2006
- The Elusive Fan: Reinventing Sports in a Crowded Marketplace, with Philip Kotler and Ben Shields, McGraw-Hill, 2006
- The Sports Strategist, with Ben Shields and Adam Grossman. Oxford Press, 2015
