= City marketing =

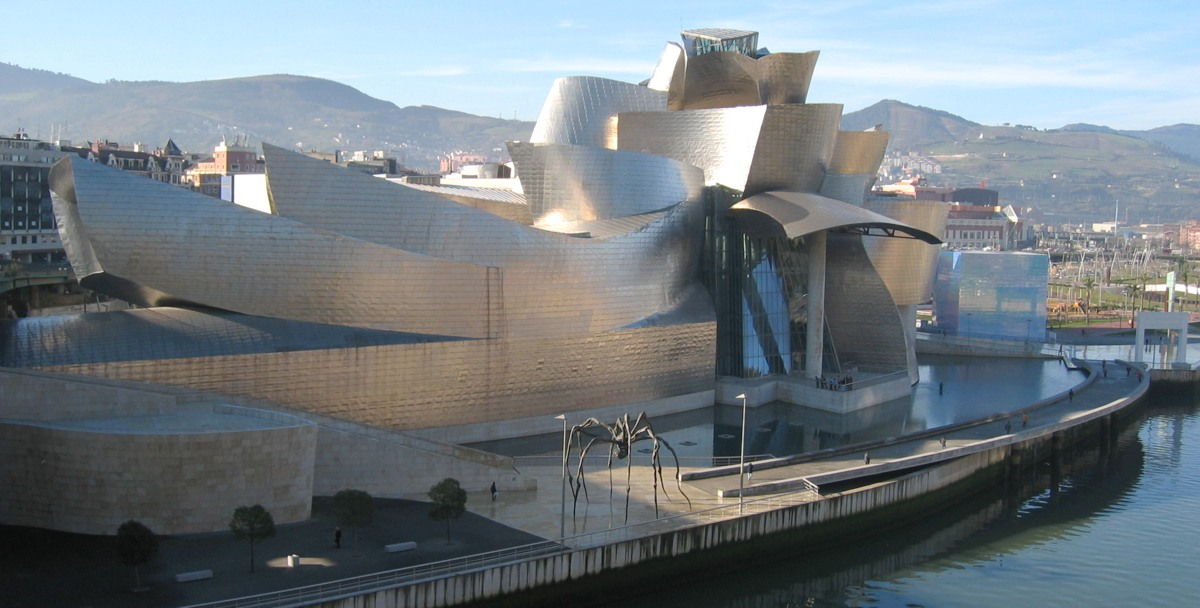
Guggenheim Museum in Bilbao is an example of a structure used for city marketing.

City marketing (related to city branding) or Place Marketing is the promotion of a city, or a district within it, with the aim of encouraging certain activities to take place there (such as tourism and attraction of foreign direct investments).

Place marketing "refers to the application of marketing instruments to geographical locations, such as cities, towns, regions and communities i.e. coordinated use of marketing tools supported by a shared customer-oriented philosophy, for creating, communicating, delivering and exchanging urban offerings that have value for the city's customers and the city's community at large".

The orchestrated attempt to differentiate place (city/ town or cities) aims at associating through:

- Design: describing place as a character
- Infrastructure: describing place as a fixed environment
- Basic services: place as a service provider
- Attraction: place as entertainment or recreation

It is used to alter the external perceptions of a city in order to encourage tourism, attract inward migration of residents, or enable business relocation. A significant feature of city marketing is the development of new landmark, or 'flagship', buildings and structures. The development of cities as a marketable product has led to competition between them for inward investment and government funding. It is often manifested in the attempts by cities to attract international sporting events, such as the Olympic Games. Competition between cities exists at the regional, national and international level; and is an effect of globalisation.
Some places are associated with certain brands and build on each other, but sometimes the commercial brand is so powerful that eclipses the place brand. An example of this is Maranello, Italy, which uses the Ferrari headquarters as a primary attraction for tourists.

City marketing can occur strategically or organically. An example of strategic city marketing is Las Vegas. The city is promoted through a variety of efforts with the strategic intent of acquiring cultural and economic bonuses. A case of organic city marketing is Jerusalem. The city is marketed without a grand strategy, as disorganized stakeholders over the course of centuries have glorified the city and encouraged pilgrimage, yielding cultural and economic bonuses. Both cases demonstrate city marketing, each with varying strategic and organic involvement. Generally, organic marketing occurs alongside strategic marketing, as the perception of the city is impossible to solely construct with strategic efforts.

According to Scott Cutlip, "one of the first, if not the first, municipal promotion programs" was led by Erastus Brainerd for the city of Seattle beginning in 1896. Seattle was in competition with Portland and Victoria as the preferred city in which to get supplied for the Klondike Gold Rush. A Bureau of Public Information was established within the city's Chamber of Commerce.

Effective city branding generally requires a long-term commitment so that a city's identity and message are communicated consistently. A shared vision among stakeholders can help produce a coherent strategy for the city's image.

== City Brand Index ==
The City Brand Index is released biannually and ranks the image of 50 cities on 6 components: presence, place, potential, pulse, people, and prerequisites. In the 2015 report, Paris took the top spot, with London, New York, Sydney, and Los Angeles taking the 2nd–5th spots respectively.

== See also ==
- Gordon, Ian (1999), "Internationalisation and Urban Competition", Urban Studies, 36 (5–6): 1001–1016, doi:10.1080/0042098993321, S2CID 153666072
- Philip Kotler, Donald H. Haider, Irving J. Rein (1993) Marketing Places: attracting investment, industry, and tourism to cities, states, and nations, Free Press, ISBN 0-02-917596-8 .
- Smyth, Hedley (1994), Marketing the city: the role of flagship developments in urban regeneration, Taylor & Francis, ISBN 978-0-419-18610-6
- Monclus, Francisco; Guardia, Manuel (2006), Culture, Urbanism and Planning, Ashgate, ISBN 978-0-7546-4623-5
