= Arthur Swanson =

American politician (1926–2010)

Arthur R. Swanson (May 28, 1926 – October 29, 2010) was an American businessman and politician.

Swanson was born in Chicago's Roseland neighborhood and attended Chicago public schools. Swanson went to the Morgan Park Junior College. He then served in the United States Army as a paratrooper during World War II in the Pacific. Swanson was involved in the real estate business in Chicago.

In the 1962 general election, Swanson defeated Democratic incumbent Robert Maher in a close race. He served as a Republican in the Illinois Senate from 1963 to 1971 from the 28th district. The 28th district, located on the southwest side of Chicago, included all or parts of Mount Greenwood, Beverly, Morgan Park, West Pullman, Roseland, Auburn Gresham, and Washington Heights. While a member of the Senate, Swanson proposed making it a felony for landlords to violate the building code as a way to fight blight. Democratic candidate Thomas Hynes defeated Swanson in the 1970 general election.

Swanson then became a lobbyist for various clients including large unit school districts. Swanson was convicted in 2006 for lying to a grand jury for some work he did as part of a lobbying assignment at McCormick Place in Chicago. He was sentenced to eight months to home confinement because of his age and health. Swanson died at his home in Homer Glen, Illinois.
