= Bernard Carey =

American politician (1934-2018)

Judge of the Circuit Court of Cook County
- In office 1988–1995

Member of the Cook County Board of Commissioners from suburban Cook County
- In office December 1982 – December 1986

State's Attorney of Cook County
- In office December 4, 1972 – December 1, 1980
- Preceded by: Edward Hanrahan
- Succeeded by: Richard M. Daley

Personal details
- Born: Clarence Bernard Carey Jr. December 16, 1934 Chicago, Illinois, U.S.
- Died: June 1, 2018 (aged 83) Naples, Florida, U.S.
- Party: Republican
- Spouse: Mary Rita
- Children: 5
- Education: Saint Mary's University of Minnesota; DePaul University (JD)

Clarence Bernard "Bernie" Carey Jr. (December 16, 1934 – June 1, 2018) was an American politician who served as Cook County State's Attorney from 1972 through 1980. Afterwards, he would serve on the Cook County Board of Commissioners and as a judge on the Circuit Court of Cook County.

A Republican, he was twice elected (in 1972 and 1976) State's Attorney in strongly Democratic Cook County, Illinois. In 1980, Carey was narrowly unseated by Democrat Richard M. Daley.

== Early life and education ==
Carey was the son of a school principal.

Carey graduated from De La Salle Institute in 1952. He graduated from Saint Mary's University of Minnesota. He graduated from DePaul University College of Law in 1958.

While he would later be a Republican politician, during his time at Saint Mary's University of Minnesota he chaired the school's chapter of Young Democrats.

== Early career ==
Carey worked as an agent of the Federal Bureau of Investigation. He met Joseph I. Woods while working there. Woods hired Carey to serve as his undersheriff, and also ushered him into Republican Party politics.

Working for Richard B. Ogilvie, Carey worked in Illinois state government, being selected by Ogilvie to organize the Illinois Bureau of Investigation in 1969.

== 1970 Cook County Sheriff campaign ==
In 1970, Carey was drafted to run as the Republican nominee for Cook County Sheriff, after incumbent Republican Joseph I. Woods opted to run for president of the Cook County Board of Commissioners instead of the seeking a second term. Carey narrowly lost the election to Democrat Richard Elrod. Ogilvie had been among those that had encouraged Carey to run for the office.

== Cook County State's Attorney ==
=== 1972 election ===
In 1972, Carey was nominated by the Republican Party for Cook County State's Attorney.

His victory over incumbent Democrat Edward Hanrahan was attributed largely to African-American voters' outrage over the 1969 police killings of Black Panther Party leaders Fred Hampton and Mark Clark under Hanrahan's leadership. Hanrahan had also been facing charges of conspiracy to obstruct justice relating to these killings until being acquitted the day before the general election.

Hanrahan had won the Democratic Party's primary, and thereby its nomination, despite the Cook County Democratic Party, led by Chicago Mayor Richard J. Daley, refusing to back his bid for reelection and supporting a primary challenger to him.

Carey's campaign was managed by Don Rose.

Carey won most of Chicago's black wards, which largely since the 1930s had typically been won by Democratic candidates in elections. He performed competitively in all fourteen black wards, and won ten of them.

Carey ran as a reformer. Carey had pledged that he would investigate allegations of voter fraud, political corruption, kickbacks, and other crimes by the Democratic establishment of Chicago and Cook County.

Carey ran what was described as an "understated" campaign.

As a candidate, Carey referred himself as, "a professional, not a politician".

=== Tenure ===
Among the investigations Carey launched was a police spying scandal, involving the so-called "Red Squad" of the Chicago Police Department infiltrating public organizations. Ultimately, after eleven years of litigation that arose, a 1985 court decision would end the Chicago Police Department's unlawful surveillance of political dissenters and their organizations.

Carey would receive praise for running an honest department as state's attorney.

Carey has received credit for lying the groundwork for the investigation that would become Operation Greylord.

Carey's office was in change of the prosecution of serial killer John Wayne Gacy.

Under Carey, the office doubled its number of attorneys to around 500 and expanded its felony review program. It also quadrupled its felony cases.

After Carey's 2018 death, Richard A. Devine, a Democrat who had served as Cook County State's Attorney from 1996 through 2008, remarked, "Bernie was a good guy. He worked hard to do a good job. He recruited professional prosecutors."

In 1976, he was reelected over Edward J. Egan, a Democrat who had stepped down from the Illinois Appellate Court in order to run against Carey. Egan had been recruited by Richard J. Daley to run against Carey. Carey campaigned against Egan, in part, by tying him to Richard J. Daley. Carey won what was seen as a strong victory, even carrying every single township of suburban Cook County. Carey was the first Republican to win multiple terms as Cook County state's attorney.

In 1980, Carey was narrowly unseated by Democrat Richard M. Daley, the son of the late Richard J. Daley.

== Subsequent career ==
In 1982, Carey ran for both as the Republican nominee for President of the Cook County Board of Commissioners and a Republican nominee to be a member of the Cook County Board of Commissioners from suburban Cook County. He lost the race for president, but won election to be a member of the board.

In 1986, Carey made an unsuccessful run for Illinois Attorney General, replacing James T. Ryan as the Republican nominee after Ryan withdrew from the race due to domestic violence allegations. This meant that Carey had to withdraw from the race to win reelection to the Cook County Board of Commissioners, thus meaning his tenure on the board ended that December.

In May 1988, the Illinois Supreme Court would appoint Carey a judge on the Cook County Circuit Court, filling the vacancy left when George M. Marovich was appointed to the federal bench. His appointment was effective on May 5, 1988, and lasted until 1990. The constituency of the judgeship was suburban Cook County. In 1990, Carey won the Republican nomination for the judgeship unopposed, Carey won reelection in the general election.

== Death ==
Carey died of stomach cancer on June 1, 2018, at his retirement home in Naples, Florida. His widow, Mary Rita Carey, disclosed his death to the press on June 4. His widow revealed, after his death, that he had been diagnosed with the stomach cancer in November 2017.

== Personal life ==
Carey had met Mary Rita, who would become his wife, at a church dance social at St. John Fisher in Chicago, Illinois. He died just over a week shy of what would have been their 60th wedding anniversary.

Carey was a longtime resident of South Holland, Illinois. After he retired at the age of 59, he and his wife moved to Florida in 1995.

Carey and his wife had five children. They had ten grandchildren and three great-grandchildren by the time of Carey's death.

== Electoral history ==
=== Cook County Sheriff ===
1970

1970 Cook County Sheriff election
Party	Candidate	Votes	%
Democratic	Richard Elrod	887,028	50.30
Republican	Bernard Carey	875,549	49.70
Total votes		1,762,577	100

=== Cook County State's Attorney ===
1972

1972 Cook County State's Attorney election
Party	Candidate	Votes	%
Republican	Bernard Carey	1,167,872	52.93
Democratic	Edward Hanrahan	1,038,666	47.07
Total votes		2,206,538	100

1976

1976 Cook County State's Attorney election
Party	Candidate	Votes	%
Republican	Bernard Carey (incumbent)	1,068,430	51.16
Democratic	Edward Egan	1,020,095	48.84
Total votes		2,088,525	100

1980

1980 Cook County State's Attorney election
Party	Candidate	Votes	%
Democratic	Richard M. Daley	1,058,529	50.39
Republican	Bernard Carey (incumbent)	1,042,287	49.61
Total votes		2,100,816	100

=== President of the Cook County Board of Commissioners ===
1982

=== Cook County Commissioner ===
1982

1986

1986 Cook County Board of Commissioners suburban Cook County Republican primary
Party	Candidate	Votes	%
Republican	Bernard Carey (incumbent)	54,525	13.21
Republican	Mary M. McDonald (incumbent)	47,117	11.43
Republican	Joseph I. Woods (incumbent)	43,912	10.64
Republican	Carl R. Hansen (incumbent)	42,499	10.30
Republican	Harold L. Tyrrell (incumbent)	41,272	10.00
Republican	Richard A. Siebel (incumbent)	39,733	9.63
Republican	Joseph D. Mathewson	38,207	9.26
Republican	Patricia J. Semrow	28,887	7.00
Republican	Gordon Scott Hirsch	27,229	6.60
Republican	Thomas E. Brennan	25,365	6.15
Republican	C. Robert McDonald	23,855	5.78

=== Illinois Attorney General ===
1986

1986 Illinois Attorney General election
Party	Candidate	Votes	%
Democratic	Neil Hartigan (incumbent)	1,925,012	61.71
Republican	Bernard Carey	1,129,193	36.20
Illinois Solidarity	John Ray Keith	33,702	1.08
Libertarian	Natalie Loder Clark	24,068	0.77
Socialist Workers	Scott Dombeck	7,254	0.23
Total votes		3,119,229	100

=== Circuit Court of Cook County ===
1990

1990 Circuit Court Judge (vacancy of George M. Marovich) Republican primary
Party	Candidate	Votes	%
Republican	Bernard Carey	115,297	100
Total votes		115,297	100

1990 Circuit Court Judge (vacancy of George M. Marovich)
Party	Candidate	Votes	%
Republican	Bernard Carey	363,357	66.97
Democratic	Ahmed A. Patel	179,206	33.03
Total votes		542,563	100

Party political offices
Preceded by James T. Ryan	Republican nominee for Attorney General of Illinois; 1986	Succeeded by Jim Ryan
