= Tax cap =

Upper bound on the amount of personal government tax

A tax cap places an upper bound on the amount of government tax a person might be required to pay. In this case the tax is said to be capped.

An example of this is the American Social Security Tax, which does not apply to wages over an annual limit.
