= John J. Lanigan =

American businessman and politician (1935-2014)

John J. "Jack" Lanigan (February 9, 1935 – October 11, 2014) was an American businessman and politician.

Born in Chicago, Illinois, Lanigan went to Chicago Vocational High School. He then received his bachelor's degree in accounting from DePaul University. Lanigan served briefly in the Illinois Air National Guard. He worked in the savings and loan business. From 1965 to 1971, Lanigan served in the Illinois State Senate and was a Republican. Later, Lanigan served as Illinois State Savings and Loan Commissioner and on the Illinois State Board of Election. Lanigan died at a hospital in Oak Lawn, Illinois.
