= Jewish Sentinel =

Weekly newspaper published by the Sentinel Publishing Company

The Jewish Sentinel called simply The Sentinel, was a weekly newspaper published each Thursday by The Sentinel Publishing Company of Chicago from 1911 to 1996.

Founded by Louis Berlin (d. 1964) with a friend, Abraham L. Weber. Berlin was the first editor. Its first issues was on February 4, 1911. In 1943 he sold it to Jack I. Fishbein (d.1996) who was editor and publisher since.

The Sentinel, Voice of Chicago Jewry, reflected the changing Chicago Jewish community. It set it apart from others by publishing in the English language while catering (also) to the immigrant community. It appealed to the wide spectrum of Chicago Jewry. In addition to local issues, it covered national and international Jewish news. "As Allied armies liberated Europe in 1945, it published some of the earliest eyewitness accounts of Nazi concentration camps."

It was one of the longest continuously published Jewish weeklies in the United States. The last issue was December 26, 1996.
