= Richard Clewis =

American politician (1934–1992)

Richard S. "Dick" Clewis (April 9, 1934 – October 28, 1992) was an American politician.

Born in Chicago, Illinois, Clewis lived in the Jefferson Park neighborhood. Clewis was a union tile setter and was involved with the labor union movement. He also worked in the Chicago Department of Human Resources and the Mayor's Office of Intergovernmental Relations. Clewis was involved in the Democratic Party. Clewis served in the Illinois State Senate from 1976 to 1979. He then served in the Chicago City Council from 1979 to 1983. Clewis died at Our Lady of the Resurrection Hospital in Chicago, Illinois.
