= 1987 Chicago mayoral election =

- April 7, 1987
- Turnout: 74.08% ▼7.99 pp
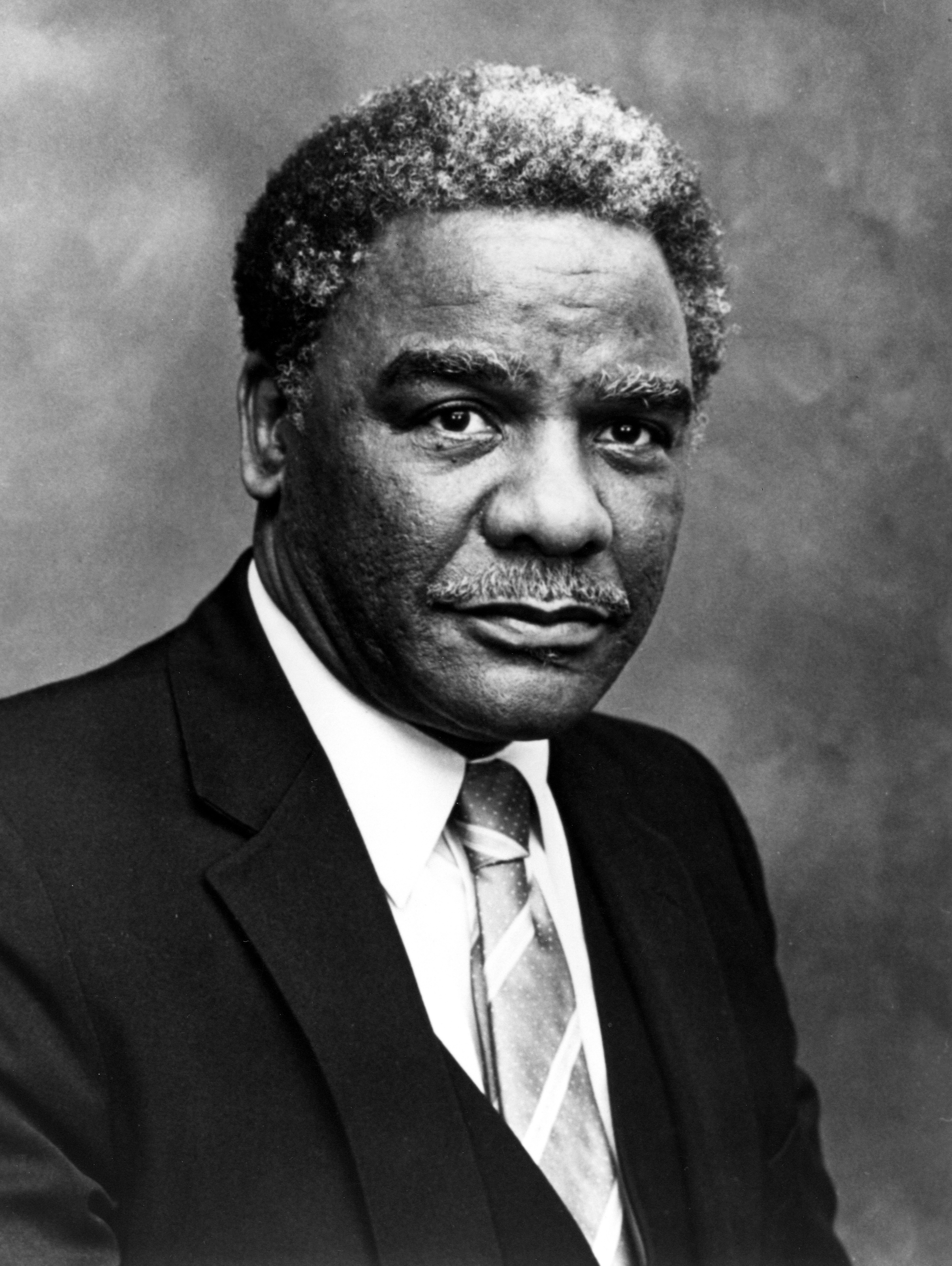

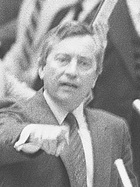

Nominee	Harold Washington	Ed Vrdolyak	Donald Haider
Party	Democratic	Illinois Solidarity	Republican
Popular vote	600,290	468,493	47,652
Percentage	53.78%	41.96%	4.26%
- Ward results
Mayor before election
Harold Washington
Democratic
Elected Mayor
Harold Washington
Democratic

The Chicago mayoral election of 1987 saw the re-election of incumbent Democrat Harold Washington. Partisan primaries were held on February 24, followed by the general election on April 7, 1987. Washington defeated Ed Vrdolyak, the leader of the Vrdolyak 29, who ran on the Illinois Solidarity Party ticket.

Former mayor Jane Byrne (who had held office from 1979 until 1983) had unsuccessfully challenged Washington in the Democratic primary.

Additionally, Cook County Assessor Thomas Hynes had run under the "Chicago First" ticket, framing himself as a centrist alternative to both Washington and Vrdolyak. However, he dropped out shortly before Election Day.

== Democratic primary ==
=== Candidates ===
Ran

- Harold Washington, incumbent mayor
- Jane Byrne, former mayor (1979–1983)
- Sheila A. Jones

Withdrew

- Thomas Hynes, Cook County assessor (withdrew and ran as "Chicago First" nominee instead

=== Campaigning ===
During incumbent Democratic Party mayor Harold Washington's first term, Ed Vrdolyak (the chairman of the Cook County Democratic Party and an alderman on the Chicago City Council) and many other city Democrats had opposed his efforts as mayor, thus creating the so-called "Council Wars". At one point, Washington considered running for reelection as an independent (thus forgoing a primary). He had at one point been widely expected to follow-through on these plans. However, Washington ultimately ran for re-nomination, formally announcing his candidacy on November 30, 1986. Former mayor Jane Byrne (who Washington had unseated in 1983 primary) had already declared her own candidacy by this time.

Four years earlier Washington had won nomination against divided opposition, and in 1987 faced a more united bloc of opponents. Nevertheless, Washington won the Democratic primary. Former mayor Jane Byrne challenged Washington in the Democratic primary for mayor. Washington had unseated her in the previous Democratic primary. Richard M. Daley, who (along with Byrne) had been one of Washington's chief opponents in the 1983 primary threw his support behind Washington.

Washington did not attend any debates. Byrne's campaign ads argued that under Washington's tenure racial tensions in Chicago had increased. Byrne's strategy aimed to limit Washington's share of the white vote to a maximum of 10%, while managing to capture 10% of the black vote for herself. Post-election polling indicated that Washington received 96% of the black vote (a greater share than he had received four years earlier). Polling also indicated that he received 21% of the white vote (more than twice what he had received four years earlier). Surveys also indicated that turnout in heavily black precincts had increased since the last election, whilst turnout in heavily white precincts had experienced a small decline.

Washington's victory made 1987 the first Chicago mayoral race since the 1975 Chicago mayoral election in which the incumbent mayor won the primary. Also running was Sheila A. Jones, a LaRouche movement devotee.

Cook County assessor Thomas Hynes had originally been running for the Democratic nomination. However, on January 7 he dropped out of the primary. On January 13 he declared that he intended to instead run as the nominee of the "Chicago First" party, a party which he himself had just founded. He and Edward Vrdolyak opted to prepare for possible third-party runs (with Vrdolyak seeking the Illinois Solidarity Party nomination) rather than risk Washington benefiting from a three-way split in the primary election similar to the one in the 1983 primary. Hynes (a career-long Democrat) opted to make a third party run after leading Republican operatives persuaded him to do so.

=== Polls ===
Poll source	Date(s) administered	Sample size	Margin of error	Jane Byrne	Harold Washington	Undecided
WBBM-TV	January 1987			39%	46%	15%

=== Results ===
Results map by ward

Turnout was 75.68%.

Washington received 96% of the African-American vote, surpassing the 80% in the 1983 election. Washington received 25% of the white vote, rising from 17% he received in 1983.

Chicago Democratic Party Mayoral Primary, 1987
Candidate	Votes	%	+/-
Harold Washington (incumbent)	586,841	53.50%	+17.22%
Jane Byrne	507,603	46.27%	+12.63%
Sheila Jones	2,549	0.23%	+0.12%
Majority	79,238	7.22%	+2.64%
Total	1,096,993	100.00%	N/A

Two reviews conducted by the Chicago Board of Election Commissioners and an election watchdog group headed by former U.S. Attorney Dan K. Webb found that tens of thousands of ballots were fraudulently cast by ineligible voters.

== Republican primary ==
=== Candidates ===
Ran

- Donald Haider, business professor and former city budget director
- Chester Hornowski, 35th Ward Republican committeeman and police officer
- Kenneth Hurst, 39th Ward Republican (simultaneously running a campaign for alderman)
- Ray Wardingley, professional clown

Disqualified from ballot

- Bernard Epton, 1983 Republican mayoral nominee

Withdrew

- Jeremiah E. Joyce, state senator (Democrat)

Declined to run

The following individuals received speculation as prospective candidates, but did not run:

- Gary Fencik, Chicago Bears player
- Louis Masotti, urbanist and professor
- Richard B. Ogilvie, former governor of Illinois
- Dan K. Webb, former United States attorney for the Northern District of Illinois

=== Campaigning ===
At one point it was believed that, if a federal bribery investigation against members of City Hall (including some in Washington's administration) had proved damaging enough to Washington, he might face a particularly notable Republican opponent such as former governor Richard B. Ogilvie or former U.S. attorney Dan K. Webb (the latter of whom had been involved in launching the aforementioned bribery probe). This did not come into fruition. However, what did come to fruition was simultaneous speculation that Democrats may bolt from their party and challenge Washington as a Republican. Before the election, Donald L. Totten (the chairman of the Cook County Republican Party) had unsuccessfully attempted to persuade a number of notable figures (including Ogilvie, Webb, and football star Gary Fencik) to run for mayor as a Republican. Webb did, however, agree to lead a county party search committee to help find a willing candidate. The Chicago Tribune reported that many leading Chicago Republicans were disinterested in running because Illinois' Republican governor (James R. Thompson) was unconcerned with the prospects of a Washington re-election, believing that it would result in a continuation of the chaotic Council Wars. Thompson saw his own position of influence in Illinois politics and enhanced by a discordant local government in Chicago. Thompson publicly denied wanting any implication of him desiring a Washington re-election, however. 1983 Republican nominee Bernard Epton announced his candidacy in 1986, but his run was not greeted with any excitement from figures in the county party.

The Republican Party nominated Donald Haider, a business professor and former city budget director. Haider was formerly a Democrat. Totten had recruited him to run. Haider was the only of Totten's recruits to agree to seek the Republican nomination. Haider was the fifth overall Chicago mayoral candidate to be a resident of Edgewater, and would have been the third mayor from Edgewater if he were elected (and the first since Martin H. Kennelly). Haider was endorsed by the city's Republican Party organization on December 4, 1986. Haider narrowly defeated 1983 nominee Bernard Epton for the Cook County Republican Party's endorsement. Despite the county party endorsing Haider, Epton and Democratic state senator Jeremiah E. Joyce indicated their continued intentions to challenge Haider in the party's primary. Neither of them ultimately were on the primary ballot, however. Epton was disqualified from the ballot and Joyce withdrew. Instead, Haider was challenged by Kenneth Hurst, Chester Hornowski, and Ray Wardingley.

Hurst (the 39th Ward Republican committeeman and was also a candidate for alderman in that ward) was a self-described Reagan Republican. He ran for mayor on a platform focusing on a wide number of social issues, including opposition to the Equal Rights Amendment, opposition to a gay rights ordinance by the City Council, and opposition to publicly subsidized abortions and the distribution of contraceptives in clinics at public schools. Hornowski (the 35th Ward Republican committeeman, a police officer, and also a candidate for alderman in the 35th ward) ran for mayor on a "law and order" platform, also pledging to end tax hikes and improve the city's schools. He focused his time more heavily on his coinciding aldermanic campaign, admitting that he had little prospect of becoming mayor. Ray Wardingley (an entertainer who performed as a clown under the name "Spanky the Clown" and had run for mayor twice before) promoted himself as the candidate representing "the little guy".

==== Results ====
Haider won the primary.

== Illinois Solidarity nomination ==
Vrdolyak formally received the Illinois Solidarity nomination in the party's primary, held on February 24. His sole opponent in the primary had been a write-in candidate.

== Independents and other third-party candidates ==
Independent candidate Ronald D. Bartos saw his name removed from the ballot due to issues with his petition.

"Chicago First" nominee Thomas Hynes withdrew two days before the election and threw his support behind Washington's two remaining opponents.

== General election ==
=== Campaign ===
Some regarded Washington's modest margin of victory in the Democratic primary as an indicator that he would be vulnerable in the general election.

Initially, Chicago First nominee Hynes polled well. He claimed he was a fresh alternative to the dirty infighting that had defined Chicago politics in recent years. Hynes also talked about being the issue-oriented candidate as opposed to some of the other candidates who allegedly talked about each other. As the election drew close, voters opposed to Mayor Washington rallied behind Vrdolyak, Washington's most fiery opponent. Hynes' support waned. Just two days before the general election, Hynes dropped out, leaving Vrdolyak and Haider as Washington's remaining opponents. Hynes did not throw his support to any of the remaining candidates, but suggested that either Vrdolyak or Haider should also drop out make it a one-on-one race against Washington.

During the campaign, in a desperate bid for press, Republican nominee Haider rode an elephant (an animal often used to symbolize the Republican Party) down State Street.

Civil rights activist Coretta Scott King, widow of Martin Luther King Jr., campaigned for Washington in predominately African-American neighborhoods throughout the city, most notably at the city's public housing complexes.

=== Results ===
Mayor of Chicago 1987 (general election)
Party	Candidate	Votes	%
Democratic	Harold Washington (incumbent)	600,290	53.78
Illinois Solidarity	Edward Vrdolyak	468,493	41.96
Republican	Donald Haider	47,652	4.26
Turnout		1,116,435	

Washington won a plurality of the vote in 27 of Chicago's 50 wards (winning a majority in 25 of those wards). Vrdolyak won a plurality in 23 wards (winning a majority in 20 of those wards).

Haider's 4.26% vote share (at the time) marked the lowest for any Republican nominee for mayor of Chicago, usurping the previous low of 15.83% seen in 1935.

Results by ward

Ward	Harold Washington (Democratic Party)		Edward Vrdolyak (Solidarity Party)		Donald Haider (Republican Party)		Total
Ward	Votes	%	Votes	%	Votes	%	Votes
1	12,179	59.7%	7,245	35.5%	977	4.8%	20,401
2	20,018	97.6%	296	1.4%	194	0.9%	20,508
3	20,769	99.0%	113	0.5%	100	0.5%	20,982
4	19,766	93.0%	946	4.5%	540	2.5%	21,252
5	22,543	92.2%	1,256	5.1%	642	2.6%	24,441
6	32,676	99.1%	182	0.6%	117	0.4%	32,975
7	16,072	83.6%	3,049	15.9%	108	0.6%	19,229
8	29,847	98.5%	340	1.1%	102	0.3%	30,289
9	22,012	95.0%	1,036	4.5%	113	0.5%	23,161
10	9,052	31.0%	19,906	68.2%	241	0.8%	29,199
11	4,460	20.5%	16,894	77.5%	432	2.0%	21,786
12	3,337	16.5%	16,186	80.2%	657	3.3%	20,180
13	1,123	3.4%	31,018	93.3%	1,092	3.3%	33,233
14	3,342	15.4%	17,766	81.9%	585	2.7%	21,693
15	18,426	79.1%	4,602	19.7%	278	1.2%	23,306
16	21,954	98.9%	154	0.7%	86	0.4%	22,194
17	25,339	99.1%	126	0.5%	99	0.4%	25,564
18	15,810	48.6%	16,146	49.6%	568	1.7%	32,524
19	6,248	19.6%	23,634	74.1%	1,992	6.2%	31,874
20	21,748	98.8%	146	0.7%	115	0.5%	22,009
21	30,370	98.9%	206	0.7%	138	0.4%	30,714
22	4,006	56.0%	2,963	41.4%	183	2.6%	7,152
23	961	3.1%	28,567	93.6%	994	3.3%	30,522
24	22,741	99.0%	125	0.5%	107	0.5%	22,973
25	4,940	50.8%	4,528	46.6%	249	2.6%	9,717
26	9,027	69.4%	3,543	27.2%	432	3.3%	13,002
27	15,282	88.7%	1,775	10.3%	168	1.0%	17,225
28	19,141	99.2%	82	0.4%	75	0.4%	19,298
29	19,389	94.7%	927	4.5%	153	0.7%	20,469
30	5,160	26.5%	13,319	68.3%	1,011	5.2%	19,490
31	9,332	67.0%	4,123	29.6%	479	3.4%	13,934
32	4,832	33.3%	9,067	62.5%	605	4.2%	14,504
33	4,737	30.4%	9,837	63.2%	1,003	6.4%	15,577
34	27,407	98.8%	231	0.8%	94	0.3%	27,732
35	2,628	14.6%	13,871	77.3%	1,454	8.1%	17,953
36	1,886	6.7%	25,096	88.5%	1,372	4.8%	28,354
37	20,522	96.8%	551	2.6%	130	0.6%	21,203
38	1,292	4.6%	25,024	89.5%	1,659	5.9%	27,975
39	2,731	13.2%	16,308	78.9%	1,632	7.9%	20,671
40	3,050	18.7%	11,518	70.7%	1,724	10.6%	16,292
41	1,582	5.2%	26,530	86.8%	2,461	8.0%	30,573
42	9,680	42.1%	10,215	44.4%	3,100	13.5%	22,995
43	7,723	29.3%	13,707	52.1%	4,897	18.6%	26,327
44	8,002	37.8%	10,389	49.1%	2,756	13.0%	21,147
45	1,562	5.5%	24,812	87.2%	2,064	7.3%	28,438
46	9,944	51.4%	7,564	39.1%	1,844	9.5%	19,352
47	4,161	21.8%	13,008	68.2%	1,896	9.9%	19,065
48	8,789	48.5%	7,348	40.6%	1,966	10.9%	18,103
49	8,269	47.1%	7,496	42.7%	1,809	10.3%	17,574
50	4,385	20.7%	14,673	69.2%	2,155	10.2%	21,213
Total	600,252	53.8%	468,444	42.0%	47,648	4.3%	1,116,344
