= Jeremiah E. Joyce =

American politician

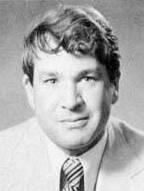
- official portrait, circa 1983

Member of the Illinois Senate from the 14th district
- In office January 1979 – January 1993
- Preceded by: Thomas Hynes
- Succeeded by: Tom Dart

Chicago Alderman from the 19th ward
- In office April 1, 1975 – February 1, 1979
- Preceded by: Thomas F. Fitzpatrick
- Succeeded by: Michael F. Sheahan

Personal details
- Born: January 3, 1943 (age 83) Chicago, Illinois
- Party: Democratic
- Education: Northern Illinois University (B.A.); Chicago State University (M.A.); DePaul University (J.D.)
- Profession: Attorney; Politician

Jeremiah E. Joyce (born January 3, 1943) is an American lawyer and politician.

== Early life ==
Born in Chicago, Illinois, Joyce received his bachelor's degree from Northern Illinois University, his masters from Chicago State University, and his J.D. degree from DePaul University College of Law.

== Career ==
Early in his career, he was a history teacher, a Chicago police officer, and an assistant state's attorney for the criminal division of the Cook County State's Attorney. He also worked as an adjutant at Saint Xavier College and the John Marshall Law School. He served on the Chicago City Council as an alderman from the 19th ward from April 1, 1975, until resigning to become state senator on February 1, 1979. He served on the Illinois State Senate from 1979 to 1993 as a Democrat. In 1999, Joyce was appointed to the Northern Illinois University Board of Trustees where he served until 2001. He has worked on the campaigns of Richard M. Daley, Dan Rostenkowski, Thomas Hynes, Michael Sheahan and Dawn Clark Netsch.

Ahead of the 1987 Chicago mayoral election, Joyce indicated his intention to run for the Republican nomination for mayor, but ultimately did not run.

== Personal life ==
He has four sons: Dan, Kevin, who served in the Illinois General Assembly, Jeremiah Joyce Jr., who ran for mayor of Chicago in the 2019 mayoral election, and Mike, who runs the Celtic Boxing Club and is married to Muhammad Ali's daughter Jamillah.
