= Bernard Epton =

American politician (1921–1987)

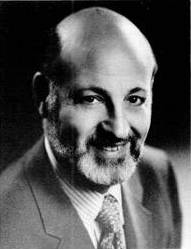
- Official portrait, c. 1981

Member of the Illinois House of Representatives from the 24th district
- In office August 30, 1969 – January 18, 1983
- Preceded by: Noble W. Lee
- Succeeded by: seat abolished

Personal details
- Born: Bernard Edward Epton; August 25, 1921 Chicago, Illinois, U.S.
- Died: December 13, 1987 (aged 66) Ann Arbor, Michigan, U.S.
- Party: Republican
- Education: University of Chicago (BA); DePaul University (JD)
- Profession: Attorney

Military service
- Allegiance: United States
- Branch/service: United States Army
- Years of service: 1942–1945
- Unit: Army Air Corps

Bernard Edward Epton (August 25, 1921 – December 13, 1987) was an American politician who served in the Illinois House of Representatives from 1969 to 1983. He was a candidate for the Republican nominee in the close and contentious Chicago mayoral election of 1983.

== Early life and education ==
Epton grew up in the South Shore neighborhood on the south side of Chicago. He graduated from O'Keefe Grammar School and Hyde Park High School. He later attended Woodrow Wilson Junior College and the University of Chicago. During his college years, Epton was active in the South Shore Chamber of Commerce and, in 1940, spoke on behalf of the Chamber's president, J. Leslie Rosenblum, about youth involvement in politics at a town hall meeting. This event was coordinated with the national radio broadcast "Is Youth Doing Its Share?" produced by America's Town Meeting of the Air.

== Military service ==
Epton served as a 2nd lieutenant in the U.S. Army Air Force during World War II, eventually reaching the rank of Captain. He was part of the Eighth Air Force, which conducted a strategic bombing campaign over Nazi-occupied Europe and Nazi Germany. Epton flew one mission with the 95th Bomb Group as a Boeing B-17 Flying Fortress navigator with the 335th Bombardment Squadron. He completed 23 missions with the 571st Bombardment Squadron in the 390th Bombardment Group as a "Mickey Operator," managing the H2X radar platform on the B-17G Flying Fortress for blind bombing operations. He returned home decorated with two Distinguished Flying Crosses, four Air Medals, five battle stars for the European Theater, and a personal citation from General Doolittle and also commended by General Kessler.

== Legal career and other work ==
After the war, Epton graduated from DePaul University College of Law and became a successful attorney specializing in insurance law. He became a partner of a firm alongside his brother, Saul A. Epton and attorney James E. Dwork. His brother Saul would later become a Cook County judge in 1959 and was a close friend of Gov. George Ryan. Epton worked as a senior partner at the downtown Chicago law firm of Epton, Mullin & Druth.

Epton served as president of the Decalogue Society of Lawyers, president of the South Shore Chamber of Commerce, and vice president of the Jane Dent Home for the Aged.

== Political career ==
=== Early politics ===
In 1947, Bernard was part of the Draft Eisenhower movement and co-founded a non-profit with Joseph A. Moller, an executive at Pure Oil Co. and a World War II pilot and veteran, and Harry G. Johnson. Their objective was to gather campaign funds for Dwight D. Eisenhower, former Chief of Staff of the United States Army, to contest the presidency of the United States. During this time Epton was president of the Illinois Republican Veterans League which started after World War I and they had collected 3,500 signatures and $16,000 in donations as campaign funds. After Eisenhower announced he wouldn't run for the 1948 presidential election, their non-profit returned the funds back to the contributors.

Later in 1948, Epton served as the campaign manager for Harry S. Ditchburne, a candidate for Cook County state's attorney. They received an endorsement from Nicholas J. Bohling, the South Shore alderman for Chicago's 7th Ward. Bohling, who later become a Cook County Circuit Court judge, held the alderman position from 1943 to 1971, believed to be the longest tenure for a Republican in the Chicago City Council. In 1949, he was elected to the board of governors of the State of Illinois Young Republican organizations and represented the Second Congressional district.

=== 1950 and 1960 U.S. House campaigns ===
Bernard's first attempt to run for Illinois's 2nd congressional district was in 1950 Republican primary, but he lost the primary to Richard B. Vail who went on to beat Barratt O'Hara and win the election to represent the district in the Eighty-second Congress (January 3, 1951 – January 3, 1953). During the primary race Vail accused Epton of being a Republican "rebel" who subscribed to New Deal theories and tactics. Also, Vail accused Epton that he didn't return the donations he received in 1948 for Eisenhower's presidency. In turn Epton then filed a $500,000 libel suit against Vail and his campaign manager Ambrose P. Finn for making false accusations regarding the funds. During these years he continued work as a lawyer and was an active member of the South Shore Chamber of Commerce, the Veterans of Foreign Wars and the Jewish War Veterans. In 1960, Bernard as a liberal Republican candidate for U.S. Representative from Illinois' 2nd congressional district but lost to the Democratic incumbent, Barratt O'Hara, during the same year John F. Kennedy narrowly won Illinois.

=== Illinois House of Representatives (1969–83) ===
Known for his wit and occasionally sharp tongue, Epton was elected to the Illinois House of Representatives in 1969, where he served until 1983. During his tenure, he chaired the chamber's Insurance Committee for twelve years. During a portion of his tenure, he served as majority whip.

=== 1983 mayoral campaign ===
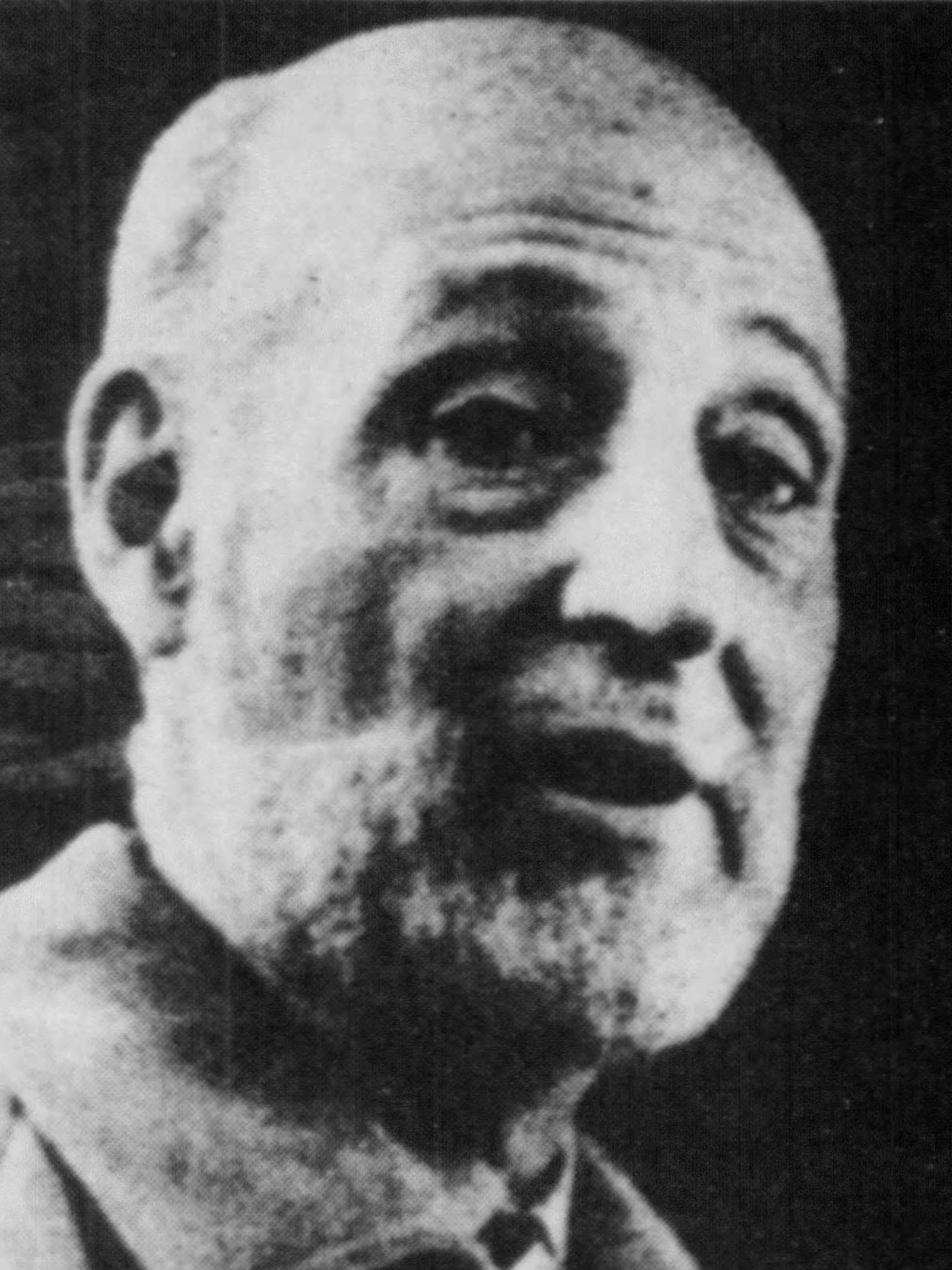
Epton in 1983

Epton was the Republican Party nominee for mayor of Chicago in 1983. In the general election, faced the liberal African American Democrat Harold Washington. In a racially charged election, Epton came within 40,000 votes (of 1.2 million cast) of defeating the Democratic nominee. His total was the high-water mark for Chicago Republicans in elections for mayor in the heavily Democratic city. Epton received 81 percent of the votes of Chicago whites, and 3 percent from blacks.

If elected, Epton would have been the city's first Jewish mayor (an accomplishment that eventually was claimed by Rahm Emanuel when he was elected in 2011) and its first Republican mayor since William Hale Thompson left office in 1931.

=== 1987 mayoral campaign ===
After being defeated by Washington, Epton briefly returned to private life.

Epton tried seeking the Republican nomination for mayor again in 1987 mayoral election, but failed to collect enough signatures to get on the ballot.

== Death ==
Four years after the 1983 mayoral election (and fewer than three weeks after Mayor Washington died suddenly of a heart attack) Epton himself suffered a coronary and died in Ann Arbor, Michigan, at the age of sixty-six on December 13, 1987. Epton was there visiting his son Jeffrey David "Jeff" Epton (born c. 1947), a socialist member of the Ann Arbor City Council and long-time critic of capital punishment.

Preceded by Wallace D. Johnson	Republican nominee for Mayor of Chicago; 1983	Succeeded by Don Haider
