= Thomas Hynes (politician) =

American lawyer and politician (1938–2019)

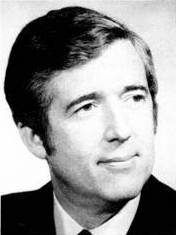
- Hynes, circa 1977

Cook County Assessor
- In office December 4, 1978 – March 9, 1997
- Preceded by: Thomas M. Tully
- Succeeded by: James Houlihan

34th President of the Illinois Senate
- In office February 16, 1977 – December 4, 1978
- Preceded by: Cecil Partee
- Succeeded by: Philip J. Rock

Member of the Illinois Senate from the 28th district
- In office January 13, 1971 – December 4, 1978
- Preceded by: Arthur Swanson
- Succeeded by: Jeremiah Joyce

Personal details
- Born: Thomas Charles Hynes; November 5, 1938 Chicago, Illinois, U.S.
- Died: May 4, 2019 (aged 80) Chicago, Illinois, U.S.
- Party: Democratic
- Spouse: Judy
- Children: 4 (including Daniel)
- Education: Loyola University (BA, JD)
- Profession: Attorney; Politician

Thomas Charles Hynes (November 5, 1938 – May 4, 2019) was a physics teacher who served as Cook County Assessor, President of the Illinois Senate, and 19th Ward Democratic Committeeman. Hynes was also a third party candidate for mayor of Chicago in 1987, dropping out before election. He was the father of former Illinois Comptroller Dan Hynes.

== Early life ==
Born in the south side of Chicago, Hynes served in the United States Army Reserve as a captain. He received his bachelor's degree from Loyola University Chicago and his J.D. degree from Loyola University Chicago School of Law. He practiced law and taught law at John Marshall Law School.

== Illinois Senate (1971–1979) ==
In the 1970 general election, Hynes defeated Republican incumbent Arthur Swanson to be elected to the Illinois Senate from the 28th district. The 28th district, located on the southwest side of Chicago, included all or parts of Mount Greenwood, Beverly, Morgan Park, West Pullman, Roseland, Auburn Gresham, and Washington Heights. Hynes served as President of the Illinois Senate from 1977 to 1978. He was succeeded in the Illinois Senate by Jeremiah E. Joyce.

== Democratic Party roles ==
For 31 years, he served as the Democratic committeeman on the South Side of Chicago.

Hynes long held a role in the Democratic National Committee, which he held until retiring in 2014. Hynes served as the Illinois state chairman of Bill Clinton's 1996 presidential campaign.

== Cook County assessor (1979–1997) ==
Hynes was elected Cook County Assessor in 1978 and re-elected five times, resigning in 1997. He resigned from the Illinois Senate after being elected assessor.

While serving as Cook County Assessor, he began the automation of the office.

=== 1987 Chicago mayoral campaign ===
In 1987, Hynes ran against incumbent Chicago Mayor Harold Washington, the city's first black mayor.

Although a member of the Democratic Party and a party official, Hynes withdrew from the Democratic mayoral primary and ran on a new ticket called the "Chicago First" party. This left former mayor Jane Byrne as the only serious opponent against Washington in the Democratic primary. The conventional wisdom at the time was that if two major white candidates ran against Washington in the Democratic primary, the white vote would be split, allowing Washington to win the primary without gaining a majority of the vote. Hynes opted to run third-party to avoid creating a three-way split in the primary election, similar to the one Washington benefited from in the 1983 primary. Despite being a lifelong Democrat, Hynes had been persuaded by leading Republican operatives to abandon a primary election candidacy and instead prepare for a third-party general election run.

Washington defeated Byrne in the Democratic primary, leaving Washington to face off against Vrdolyak, Hynes, and Haider in the general election. Soon after the primary, Bryne endorsed Washington.

Initially Hynes, who had not been visible in the racially polarized "Council Wars" of Washington's first term, polled well. He claimed he was a fresh alternative to the dirty infighting that had defined Chicago politics in recent years. Hynes also talked about being the issue-oriented candidate as opposed to some of the other candidates who allegedly talked about each other. In one of his commercials, Hynes contended that he could reunite a divided city and make Chicago great again. Said Hynes, "Chicago used to enjoy a national reputation as a good place to do business. Today, we've fallen behind the rest of the nation in economic growth. Politically, our city is so divided, business is looking elsewhere and we're losing job. As mayor, I believe I can reopen communication with businesses and renew the spirit of cooperation we need to move ahead. I want to restore Chicago to its rightful place as one of America's great cities." In another commercial Hynes tried to pass himself off as a policy wonk too nerdy to instigate a fight. The commercial comically featured a supporter falling asleep while Hynes droned on and on about budget issues. Washington challenged Hynes' billing of himself as a clean, peaceful man. In a Washington commercial, the narrator alleged that Hynes took a $90,000 a year job at a law firm which thereafter received clout contracts despite claiming to be for ethics, that Hynes packed his payroll with cronies to the exclusion of women and minorities despite saying he'll run the city fairly, and that Hynes supported Vrdolyak during the city council wars despite Hynes presentation of himself as above city council infighting. The commercial concluded with the line, "Forget the image, check the record."

As the election drew near, voters opposed to Mayor Washington rallied behind Vrdolyak, Washington's most fiery opponent. Hynes' support waned. Just two days before the general election, Hynes dropped out, leaving Edward Vrdolyak and Republican Donald Haider as Mayor Washington's remaining opponents. Hynes did not throw his support to any of the remaining candidates, but suggested that either Vrdolyak or Haider should also drop out make it a one-on-one race against Washington. "I now believe Harold Washington cannot be defeated if he faces more than one opponent," Hynes said in his resignation remarks. "I believe with every ounce of fervor in my soul that the people of Chicago deserve an opportunity for a real choice. ... Mr. Vrdolyak and Mr. Haider must now confront the fact that Harold Washington will win if they both remain in this race. Their hour of decision is at hand." His supporters were devastated; most reporters just rolled their eyes. "What drove Hynes out was the frightening specter of Tuesday night, when the results would show him finishing a drab third in the voting," Mike Royko wrote. "Then he would have been labeled with the dreaded word 'spoiler,' which in Chicago means a white candidate who causes a black man to become mayor." Both Vrdolyak and Haider stayed in the race, and Washington still got more than 50 percent of the vote—meaning he probably would have won even with only one white candidate to run against.

== Personal life and death ==
Hynes was the father of Daniel Hynes (former Illinois comptroller) and Matt Hynes (a former senior mayoral adviser to Rahm Emanuel).

He died on May 4, 2019, at Northwestern Memorial Hospital in Chicago from complications due to Parkinson's disease.
