= David Orr =

American politician (born 1944)

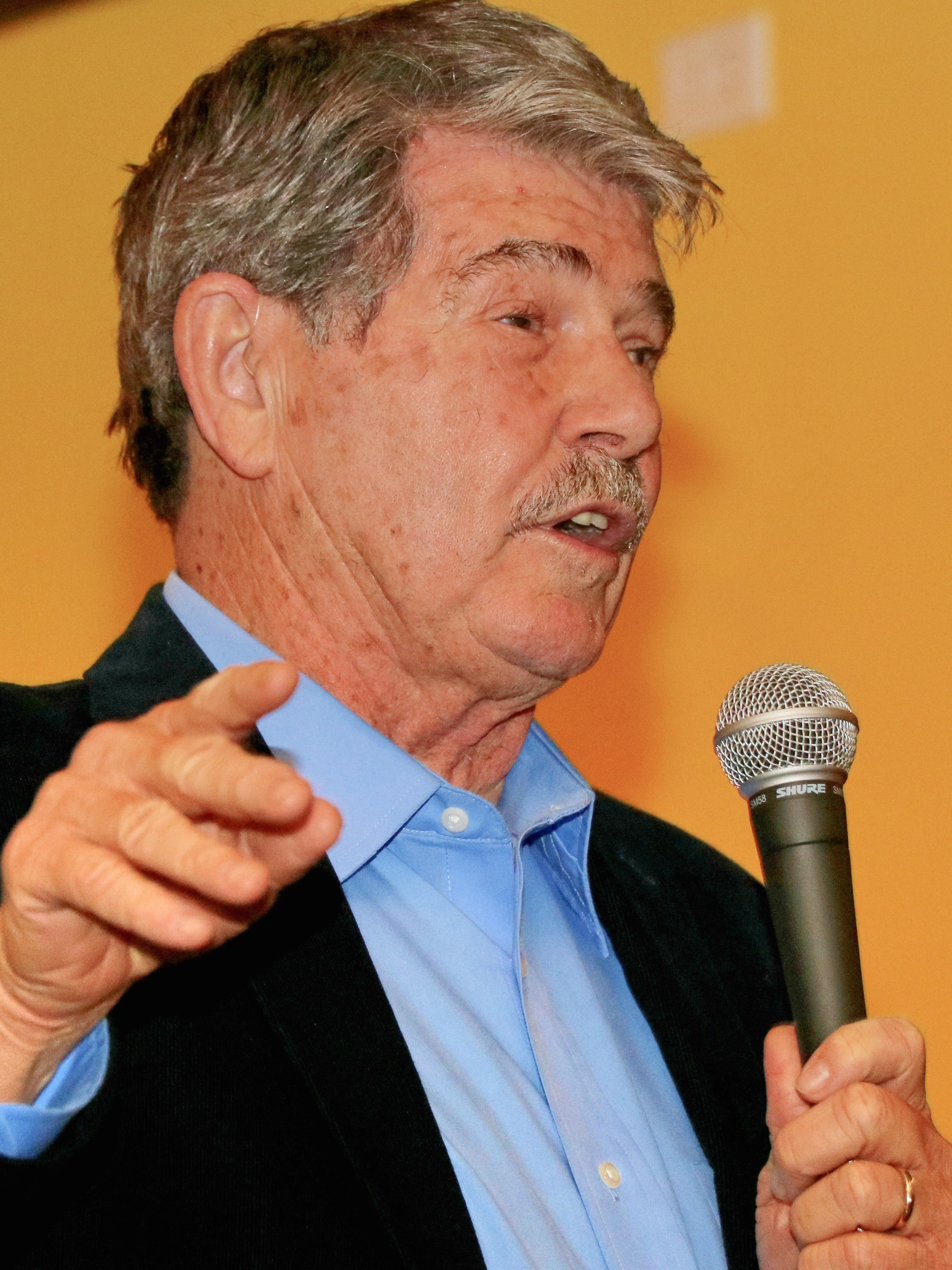
- Orr, speaking at a 2019 event

22nd Cook County Clerk
- In office December 11, 1990 – December 10, 2018
- Preceded by: Stanley Kusper
- Succeeded by: Karen Yarbrough

52nd Mayor of Chicago
- Acting
- In office November 25, 1987 – December 2, 1987
- Preceded by: Harold Washington
- Succeeded by: Eugene Sawyer

3rd Vice Mayor of Chicago
- In office April 1987 – May 1988
- Mayor: Harold Washington; Eugene Sawyer
- Preceded by: Richard Mell
- Succeeded by: Terry Gabinski

Member of the Chicago City Council from the 49th Ward
- In office April 16, 1979 – December 10, 1990
- Preceded by: Esther Saperstein
- Succeeded by: Robert Clarke

Personal details
- Born: David Duvall Orr; October 4, 1944 (age 82) Chicago, Illinois, U.S.
- Party: Democratic
- Spouse: Loretta Orr
- Children: 4
- Education: Simpson College (BA); Case Western Reserve University (MA)
- Website: Official website

David Duvall Orr (born October 4, 1944) is an American Democratic politician who served as the Cook County Clerk from 1990 to 2018. Orr previously served as alderman for the 49th ward in Chicago City Council from 1979 to 1990. He briefly served as acting Mayor of Chicago from November 25 to December 2, 1987, following the death of Mayor Harold Washington. Orr retired from the office of Cook County Clerk in 2018, opting not to run for an eighth term.

== Early life ==
Born in Chicago, Orr is a graduate of Simpson College in Indianola, Iowa for his undergraduate and his Masters Degree in American Studies from Case Western Reserve University in Cleveland. He was an instructor at Mundelein College in 1979, when he first decided to run for alderman.

== Chicago City Council (1979-90) ==
Orr entered politics as an "independent Democrat", opposed to the official Democratic Party organization. The party organization was then controlled by the "Machine" created by Mayor Richard J. Daley, who died in December 1976. In February 1979, Orr was elected by a narrow margin of 320 votes alderman from the 49th Ward, which covered most of the Rogers Park neighborhood in the far northeastern corner of Chicago.

Orr was considered a lakefront liberal.

Orr joined with other white "independent" aldermen from the "Lakefront" and black dissident aldermen from the south side and west side in opposing the corruption and racism of the Machine. Orr was re-elected in February 1983 and 1987.

In February 1983, with the Machine divided between supporters of Jane Byrne and Richard M. Daley, black independent Harold Washington became Mayor. Washington was opposed by 29 aldermen who tried to paralyze city government for three years in what was dubbed "Council Wars." Orr backed Washington, one of only five white aldermen to do so. After the Washington coalition won the majority in 1986, after special aldermanic elections were held, Orr was elected by the City Council in 1987 to serve as the city's Vice Mayor.

In 1986, Orr, with the assistance of fellow alderman Bernard Stone, successfully pushed an ordinance through City Council that declared Chicago a "nuclear-free zone".

As a city councilman, Orr often prevailed in getting the council to take actions which he fought for. Orr had a reputation of being a "clean" politician, devoid of corruption or negativity. Chicago Tribune columnist Mike Royko, a cynic towards local politics, stated in 1988, "there are three or four aldermen who are suspected of being honest and [Orr] is one of them."

In May 1988, the City Council voted to oust Orr from his position as Vice Mayor as retribution for his attempts to make reforms that would have held the council's committees more accountable for the budgets they manage.

After Orr resigned from the City Council in 1990 in order to serve as county clerk, then-mayor Richard M. Daley appointed Robert Clarke as his replacement. In the 1991 aldermanic election, Clarke was defeated by Joe Moore, whom Orr had endorsed.

=== Acting Mayor of Chicago (1987) ===
When Mayor Washington died of a heart attack on November 25, 1987, Orr, as Vice Mayor, became acting mayor. He took office on November 25 and served for a week until the Council elected a permanent replacement mayor. Orr was suggested as the obvious choice, but as a reformer, he was vehemently opposed by the remaining Machine aldermen, and many black Chicagoans wanted a black replacement for Washington. Alderman Eugene Sawyer, who was black, and before 1983 had been a Machine loyalist, was chosen instead on December 2, 1987. Orr chaired Council meetings as mayor on December 1, a memorial meeting for Washington, and on December 2, when Sawyer was selected as his replacement.

== County Clerk (1990-2018) ==
In 1990, the office of Cook County clerk was vacated by Stanley T. Kusper, Jr. who ran unsuccessfully for president of the Cook County Board of Commissioners. Orr ran for the office, and won the Democratic primary handily with 56% of the vote against two opponents. He also won easily in the general election, receiving more votes than any other candidate for county office. He was re-elected in 1994, 1998, 2002, 2006, 2010, and 2014. In 1998, 2002, 2006, and 2010, he was unopposed for renomination, and faced only token opposition in the general election.

After taking office, Orr put in place reforms, including instituting a new ethics guide for employees of the Office of the Cook County Clerk.

In 1994, Orr was considered a potential front-runner if he entered the election for president of the Cook County Board of Commissioners, but he ultimately decided to run for reelection as clerk instead of seeking the position.

On June 21, 2017, he announced that he would not run for reelection to an eighth term. Karen Yarbrough, the then-Cook County Recorder of Deeds, succeeded Orr as the Clerk.

== Subsequent career and activity ==
In 2013, Orr was appointed as a Senior Fellow at the Harris School of Public Policy Studies in the University of Chicago.

In June 2018, Orr founded a political action committee called Good Government Illinois, with the goal of supporting election reform, campaign finance reform, and candidates with shared goals. He supported several candidates in the 2019 Chicago aldermanic election, including Maria Hadden (who ran for his old 49th ward seat), Michael Rodriguez, Andre Vasquez, Matt Martin, Susan Sadlowski Garza, David Moore, and Scott Waguespack.

Orr considered running for mayor of Chicago in the 2019 Chicago mayoral election after incumbent mayor Rahm Emanuel declared in early September 2018 that he would no longer be seeking a third term. However, he ultimately did not run. In the week prior to the first round of the election, Orr publicly endorsed the candidacy of Lori Lightfoot.

In the 2023 Chicago mayoral election, Orr endorsed U.S. Representative Chuy Garcia's candidacy for mayor.

== Accolades ==
In 2012, Orr was inducted into the Chicago Gay and Lesbian Hall of Fame as a Friend of the Community.

== Electoral history ==
=== Aldermanic ===
1979 Chicago 49th Ward aldermanic general election
Candidate	Votes	%
David Orr	9,108	52.04
Homer H. Johnson	8,394	47.96
Total votes	17,502	100

1983 Chicago 49th Ward aldermanic general election
Candidate	Votes	%
David D. Orr (incumbent)	12,881	60.82
Nancy E. Kelly	7,952	37.55
William Deri-Davis	346	1.63
Total votes	21,179	100

1987 Chicago 49th Ward aldermanic general election
Candidate	Votes	%
David D. Orr (incumbent)	9,956	57.16
Jack Flemming	5,841	33.53
Howard E. Spinner	1,052	6.04
Grady A. Humphrey	570	3.27
Total votes	17,419	100

=== County Clerk ===
1990

1990 Cook County Clerk Democratic primary
Party	Candidate	Votes	%
Democratic	David D. Orr	353,772	55.94
Democratic	Calvin R. Sutker	144,083	22.78
Democratic	Joanne H. Alter	134,560	21.28
Total votes		632,415	100

1990 Cook County Clerk election
Party	Candidate	Votes	%
Democratic	David D. Orr	799,884	63.48
Republican	Samuel "Sam" Panayotovich	353,531	28.06
Harold Washington	Heldia R. Richardson	106,588	8.46
Total votes		1,260,003	100

1994

1994 Cook County Clerk Democratic primary
Party	Candidate	Votes	%
Democratic	David D. Orr (incumbent)	454,873	78.37
Democratic	Patricia Young	140,711	23.83
Total votes		595,584	100

1994 Cook County Clerk election
Party	Candidate	Votes	%
Democratic	David D. Orr (incumbent)		
Republican	Edward Howlett		
Harold Washington	Herman W. Baker, Jr.		
Populist	Curtis Jones		
Total votes			100

1998

1998 Cook County Clerk Democratic primary
Party	Candidate	Votes	%
Democratic	David Orr (incumbent)	404,839	100
Total votes		404,839	100

1998 Cook County Clerk election
Party	Candidate	Votes	%
Democratic	David Orr (incumbent)	988,136	77.30
Republican	Judith A. "Judie" Jones	290,256	22.70
Total votes		1,278,392	100

2002

2002 Cook County Clerk Democratic primary
Party	Candidate	Votes	%
Democratic	David D. Orr (incumbent)	603,556	100
Total votes		603,556	100

2002 Cook County Clerk election
Party	Candidate	Votes	%
Democratic	David D. Orr (incumbent)	992,441	76.11
Republican	Kathleen A. Thomas	311,552	23.89
Total votes		1,303,993	100

2006

2006 Cook County Clerk Democratic primary
Party	Candidate	Votes	%
Democratic	David D. Orr (incumbent)	520,407	100
Total votes		520,407	100

2006 Cook County Clerk election
Party	Candidate	Votes	%
Democratic	David D. Orr (incumbent)	1,034,263	80.78
Republican	Nancy Carlson	246,044	19.22
Total votes		1,280,307	100

2010

2010 Cook County Clerk Democratic primary
Party	Candidate	Votes	%
Democratic	David D. Orr (incumbent)	502,817	100
Total votes		502,817	100

2010 Cook County Clerk election
Party	Candidate	Votes	%
Democratic	David D. Orr (incumbent)	1,047,462	77.77
Republican	Angel Garcia	299,449	22.23
Total votes		1,346,911	100

2014

2014 Cook County Clerk Democratic primary
Party	Candidate	Votes	%
Democratic	David D. Orr (incumbent)	241,876	100
Total votes		241,876	100

2014 Cook County Clerk election
Party	Candidate	Votes	%
Democratic	David D. Orr (incumbent)	1,061,515	100
Total votes		1,061,515	100

Political offices
Preceded by Harold Washington	Mayor of Chicago; November 25 – December 2, 1987	Succeeded by Eugene Sawyer
