= Terry Gabinski =

American politician (1938–2026)

4th Vice Mayor of Chicago
- In office 1988–1998
- Mayor: Eugene Sawyer; Richard M. Daley
- Preceded by: David Orr
- Succeeded by: Bernard Stone

Member of the Chicago City Council from the 32nd ward
- In office March 12, 1969 – May 20, 1998
- Preceded by: Robert Sulski
- Succeeded by: Theodore Matlak

Personal details
- Born: November 20, 1938
- Died: April 8, 2026 (aged 87) Chicago, Illinois, U.S.
- Party: Democratic
- Spouse: Celeste
- Education: Northern Illinois University (BS); Loyola University (MEd)
- Profession: Politician, teacher

Theris M. Gabinski (November 30, 1938 – April 8, 2026) was an American politician who served as a Chicago alderman representing the 32nd ward from 1969 to 1998 and as Democratic committeeman from the city's 32nd ward from 1988 to 2008.

== Life and career ==
Gabinski earned a Bachelor of Science in chemistry from Northern Illinois University in 1962. He became a teacher at Ridgewood High School in suburban Norridge before becoming an aide to Congressman Dan Rostenkowski. Rostenowski later backed him for an appointment to Alderman for the 32nd ward after Robert Sulski became a judge on the Circuit Court of Cook County. He took office the same day as Edward M. Burke.

During the Council Wars he sided with the all-white Edward Vrdolyak 29 in opposition to Mayor Harold Washington. In 1988, he was appointed Democratic Committeeman for the ward; succeeding his mentor Rostenkowski. In the 1987 election when Washington took a majority on the council, he defeated Washington-ally Emma Lozano Rico, the sister of labor activist Rudy Lozano, with 75% of the vote.

From 1988 until 1998, Gabinski was the city's Vice Mayor. Gabinski was elected Vice Mayor by the Chicago City Council after they voted to oust David Orr over his attempts to make reforms that would have held the council's committees more accountable for the budgets they manage.

He resigned from the council before the end of his eighth term and was succeeded by Theodore Matlak on May 20, 1998. In 2008, he stepped down as Democratic Committeeman allowing his almost opponent in 2004, John Fritchey, to run with token opposition.

Gabinski died in Chicago on April 8, 2026, at the age of 87.
