= Charles Beach =

American judge in Illinois

Charlie Beach
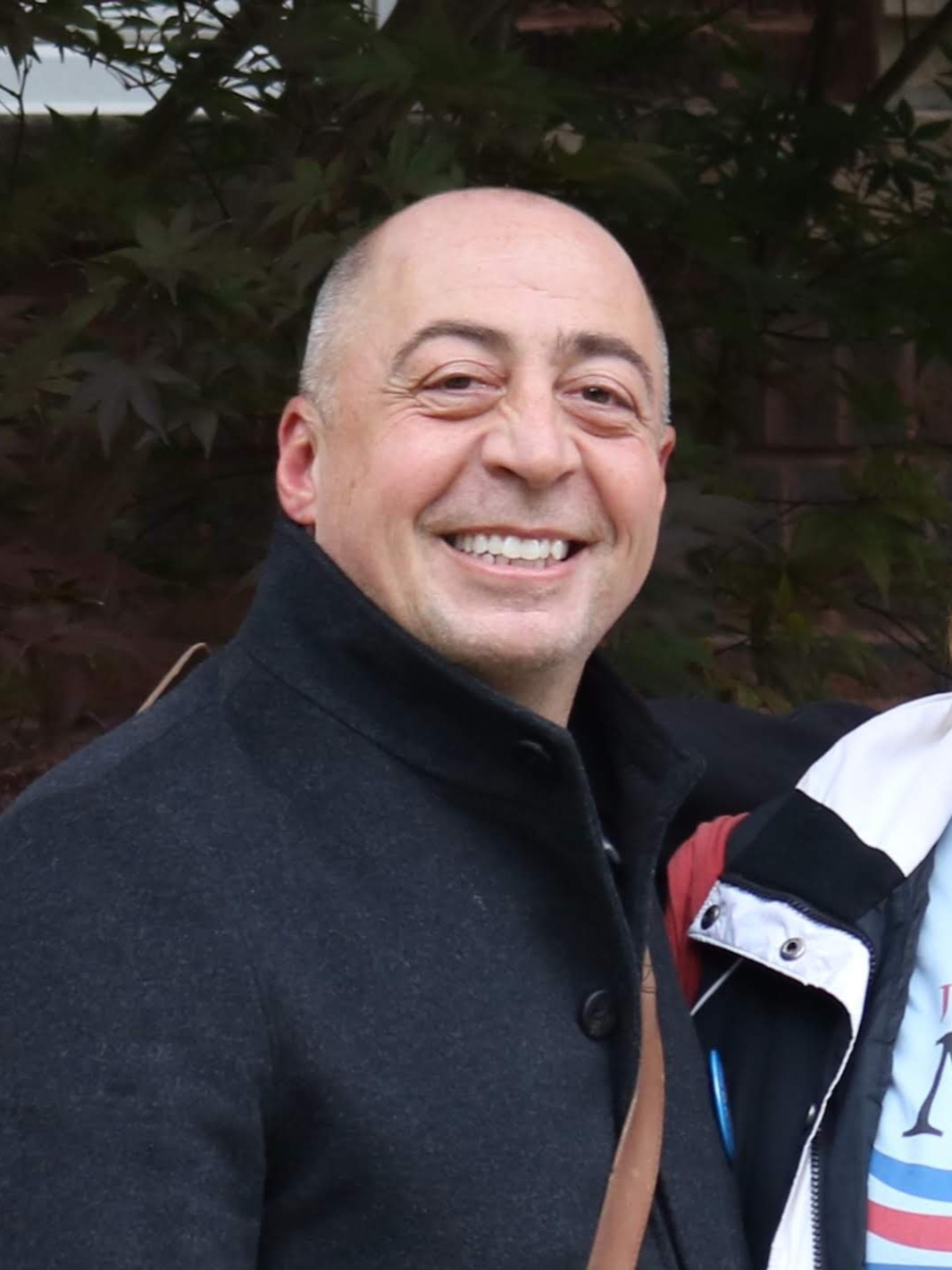
- Charles Beach during his campaign for Cook County judge

Chief Judge of the Cook County Circuit Court
- Designate
- Assuming office December 1, 2025
- Succeeding: Timothy C. Evans

Judge of the Cook County Circuit Court from the 6th subcircuit
- Incumbent
- Assumed office December 5, 2022
- In office September 15, 2017 – December 3, 2018
- Appointed by: Illinois Supreme Court
- Preceded by: Richard Cooke

Personal details
- Born: 1969 (age 56–57) Ann Arbor, Michigan, U.S.
- Education: Michigan State University (BS); DePaul University (JD)

Charles S. Beach II (born 1969) is an American attorney and jurist who serves on the Circuit Court of Cook County. On September 10, 2025, he was elected Chief Judge of the Circuit Court of Cook County by a vote of 144 to 109, defeating eight–term incumbent Timothy C. Evans; one ballot was reported spoiled. His three–year term as chief judge began on December 1, 2025.

== Early life and education ==
Beach was born in 1969 in Ann Arbor, Michigan. He earned a B.S. in Finance and Insurance from Michigan State University in 1993 and a J.D. from DePaul University College of Law in 1996.

== Legal career ==
After law school, Beach worked in the Cook County Public Defender's Office and later clerked for Illinois Appellate Court Justice Judith Koehler. He entered private practice and eventually led his own law firm, focusing largely on criminal defense. He co-founded the Chicago Bar Association's pro bono Statutory Summary Suspension Program and wrote and lectured on DUI and traffic law.

== Judicial service ==
In 2017, the Illinois Supreme Court appointed Beach as a circuit judge in Cook County's 6th Subcircuit to fill a vacancy created by the resignation of Judge Richard C. Cooke. His appointment took effect September 15, 2017, and ran through December 3, 2018.

In May 2018, circuit judges selected Beach to serve as an associate judge of the Circuit Court of Cook County. He later served in the court's Pretrial Division, where he presided over bail hearings, and in the Law Division on a civil motion calendar.

Beach then ran unopposed in 2022 and was elected as a circuit judge from the 6th Subcircuit. He assumed office December 5, 2022.

== Election as Chief Judge ==
On September 10, 2025, Beach was elected Chief Judge of the Circuit Court of Cook County by his fellow circuit judges, receiving 144 votes to Evans's 109, with one spoiled ballot. The vote ended Evans's 24 years as chief judge and made Beach the first new leader of the county's unified trial court since 2001. His three-year term is scheduled to begin December 1, 2025.

== Personal life ==
According to his campaign biography, Beach is married and has three children.
