= Monroe Anderson =

Journalist, author, press secretary

Monroe Anderson III
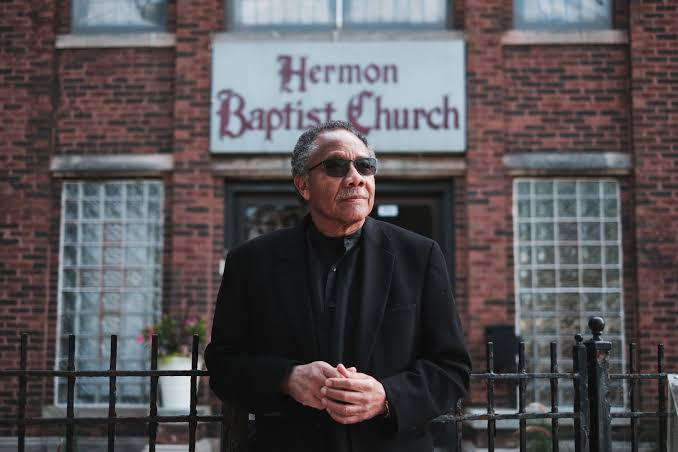
- Born: April 6, 1947 (age 79); Gary, Indiana
- Education: B.A '71 Indiana University
- Occupations: Journalist, author, press secretary
- Spouse(s): Joyce Owens; died 2024
- Children: 2
- Writing career
- Period: 1968 to present
- Subjects: Non-Fiction- Urban and rural Black Culture, Politics, Racism, Poverty
- Notable works: Brothers: Black and Poor- A True Story of Courage and Survival
- Notable awards: Indiana University Media School’s Distinguished Alumni Awards leadership in journalism and television 2021.

Monroe Anderson III (born April 6, 1947) is an American journalist, editor, and commentator who has been nominated for the Pulitzer Prize four times and was the press secretary of Chicago Mayor Eugene Sawyer. Anderson has held positions in magazines, newspapers, television networks, and digital platforms.

== Early life and family ==
Anderson born to Monroe Anderson Jr. an accountant and business owner and Norman Jean Scott, a domestic worker in Gary, Indiana. Anderson was raised in Gary, where he attended public schools, grew up in a blue-collar neighborhood near the Delaney housing projects, and developed an early interest in writing. After graduating from high school, he attended Indiana University Bloomington, earning a Bachelor of Arts degree in 1971. Anderson has attributed his journalistic perspective to his upbringing in Gary and his later experiences living in Chicago, stating that they provided an "insider-outsider" viewpoint that informed his reporting on race, poverty, public housing, and urban affairs.

== Career ==
Anderson began his journalism career as a reporter for The National Observer. In 1968, while serving as an intern at Newsweek, he covered anti-war protests at the Democratic National Convention in Chicago, where he was attacked by police during clashes between demonstrators and law enforcement. He later worked as an assistant editor at Ebony magazine before becoming a correspondent for Newsweek.

In 1985, Anderson resigned from the Chicago Tribune amid editorial disagreements, expressing concerns about the newspaper's portrayal of Black Chicagoans and what he regarded as bias in its coverage of Chicago's Black community.

== Later career ==
Anderson taught feature writing and journalism at Columbia College Chicago. He also served as director of station services and community affairs at WBBM-TV (CBS 2) in Chicago. During his tenure, he became the host and executive producer of the public-affairs television program Common Ground.

In 2003, Chicago publisher Hermene Hartman appointed Anderson editor of N'DIGO, a Black community newspaper. That same year, he became editor of SaVoy magazine. Anderson has also served on the board of Gilda's Club, a cancer-support organization.

Anderson is a co-author of the nonfiction book Brothers, published by William Morrow and Company in 1988. He also contributed to Restoration 1989: Chicago Elects a New Daley, published by Lyceum in 1993, which examined the 1989 Chicago mayoral special election.

From 1988 to 1989, Anderson served as press secretary to Chicago Mayor Eugene Sawyer.

Anderson has contributed to the Chicago Sun-Times and The Triibe, writing about subjects including the legacy of Jesse Jackson and protests in Chicago.

== Personal life ==
Anderson was married to artist and professor Joyce Owens (1947–2024), with whom he has two sons.

== Awards and honors ==
- Indiana University Media School's Distinguished Alumni Awards leadership in journalism and television 2021.

== Selected works ==
=== Articles ===
- Gaines, Williams & Anderson Monroe ( June 1976). Crackdown ordered on car repairs cheats: Licensed shops sought by Daley Licensing sought City orders crackdown on auto repair cheats. The Chicago Tribune.
- Anderson, Monroe (July, 1977). Trouble old and new: A civil rights giant is stumbling NAACP. The Chicago Tribune.
- Anderson, Monroe. (November 1982). Black may redo mayor script. The Chicago Tribune.
- Anderson, Monroe ( September 1983). Jesse Jackson and wolf tickets.The Chicago Tribune.
- Anderson, Monroe (February 1984). Where are good white leaders?. The Chicago Tribune.
- Anderson, Monroe. (January 2011). The Root: Braun’s bid for mayor is looking unlikely. Wbur.
- Anderson, Monroe. (June 2020). 1968: When the whole world was watching, the Chicago Police rioted. The Triibe.
- Anderson, Monroe (February 17, 2026). "After covering Jesse Jackson for 50 years, I'm going to miss his fierce activism". The Chicago Sun-times.

=== Books ===
- Brothers: Black and Poor - A True Story of Courage and Survival (1988), ISBN 978-0-688-07622-1
- Restoration 1989: Chicago Elects a New Daley (1993), ISBN 978-0-925065-09-4
- Chicago's Modern Mayors From Harold Washington to Lori Lightfoot (2024), ISBN 978-0-252-08771-4
