= Bernard Stone =

Chicago alderman (1927–2014)

- Alderman Stone in 2010

5th Vice Mayor of Chicago
- In office 1998–2011
- Mayor: Richard M. Daley
- Preceded by: Terry Gabinski
- Succeeded by: Ray Suarez

Chicago Alderman
- In office 1973–2011
- Preceded by: Jack I. Sperling
- Succeeded by: Debra Silverstein
- Constituency: 50th Ward

Personal details
- Born: November 24, 1927 Chicago, Illinois, U.S.
- Died: December 22, 2014 (aged 87) Skokie, Illinois, U.S.
- Party: Democratic (1956–1987; 1990–2014)
- Other political affiliations: Republican (1987–1990)
- Spouse: Lois Stone (m. 1949; died 1995)
- Children: 4
- Education: Wilbur Wright College (B.A.); John Marshall Law School (J.D.)

Military service
- Allegiance: United States
- Branch/service: United States Army
- Battles/wars: World War II

Bernard "Berny" L. Stone (November 24, 1927 – December 22, 2014) was alderman of the 50th Ward of the City of Chicago, Illinois from 1973 to 2011. The 50th Ward encompasses part of Chicago's far North Side and includes the West Ridge and Peterson Park neighborhoods. First elected to the Council in 1973, Stone was the second longest-serving alderman (after Edward M. Burke). His tenure spanned the terms of seven Mayors, from Richard J. Daley to Richard M. Daley. Stone was also Vice Mayor of the City of Chicago from 1998 to 2011.

Stone was a part of the "Vrdolyak 29", which opposed Mayor Harold Washington's agenda. Though he was a Democrat for most of his life, Stone briefly followed Alderman Edward Vrdolyak to the Republican Party, and unsuccessfully ran against Carol Moseley Braun for Cook County Recorder of Deeds in 1988. Stone was a protagonist in a protracted legal conflict with the neighboring suburb of Evanston in 1993–1994. Employees of Stone's 2007 re-election campaign were convicted of vote fraud in 2010. Stone was "outspoken" and "relished the rough and tumble of politics".

== Early life and education ==
Stone was born on November 24, 1927 in Chicago to Jewish immigrant parents. He was educated in the Chicago Public Schools system at Von Humboldt Elementary and Tuley High School, which is now Roberto Clemente Community Academy. Stone enlisted in the United States Army in 1945. Stone attended Wright Junior College, now known as Wilbur Wright College, and John Marshall Law School.

== Early political career ==
=== Early attempts at elected office ===
In 1956, Stone ran in the Democratic primary for the Illinois House of Representatives, but was defeated by Esther Saperstein, who went on to serve in the Illinois House for ten years and became Illinois' first female state senator.

In 1963, Stone was one of a record 233 candidates filing to run for Chicago alderman, and one of ten challengers to the incumbent in the 50th Ward, Republican Alderman Jack I. Sperling, who sought a third four-year term. Stone filed without the endorsement of a political party. By February 1963, Stone was not on the ballot for the February 26, 1963, election.

=== 1973 campaign for alderman ===
On January 29, 1973, the Supreme Court of Illinois appointed Alderman Sperling to fill a vacancy as Cook County Circuit Court judge. The Chicago City Council called a special election for June 5, 1973, to fill vacant City Council seats, including the 50th Ward alderman seat. Stone was an employee in the office of Cook County Sheriff Richard Elrod and the vice president of the 50th Ward Regular Democratic Organization, which endorsed him for alderman. Stone was one of five candidates who filed to finish Sperling's term. Another candidate, independent Theodore Berland, was a medical writer and nationally recognized anti-noise activist who was chiefly responsible for Chicago's anti-noise ordinance. Stone organized the "Concerned Citizens of the 50th Ward" to counter neighboring Lincolnwood's opposition to a bridge over the North Shore Channel at Pratt Avenue, which Stone called a "necessity" for the 50th Ward. In the first round of voting, Stone led with 47% of the vote and Berland finished second, with 27%. In the run-off election on July 3, 1973, Stone defeated Berland 12,882 to 10,958, with a turnout of about 53%, winning the 50th Ward for Democrats for the first time since 1955.

== Chicago City Council (1973–2011) ==
=== The Republican years (1987–1990) ===
Former Alderman and former Cook County Democratic Party chairman Edward R. Vrdolyak converted to the Republican Party and encouraged Stone to follow suit and run for Cook County Recorder of Deeds. By threatening Republican Party of Cook County leadership that he would run for county chairman and Cook County State's Attorney, Vrdolyak brokered a deal to slate himself for Clerk of the Circuit Court of Cook County and Stone for Cook County Recorder of Deeds. On October 29, 1987, Stone announced he had joined the Republican Party and expressed his intention to run for Recorder. "I can no longer be part of a party that punishes law-abiding, tax-paying citizens and communities", Stone said, adding that he also felt "the Democratic Party is drifting away from America's historically strong commitment to Israel".

On November 25, 1987, Chicago Mayor Harold Washington died. Stone announced his candidacy for mayor to fellow aldermen on November 29 and to the public on December 1. Many saw Stone's mayoral candidacy as an attempt to publicize his Recorder race. Two days later the City Council elected Alderman Eugene Sawyer as mayor.

In 1988, Stone ran as a Republican against African-American Democratic Illinois State Representative Carol Moseley Braun for Cook County Recorder of Deeds. Stone told reporters that although he did not expect their newspapers' endorsements, "Just run a picture of Braun. That's all I ask". Stone included Braun's photograph in his campaign flyers. Stone was defeated by Braun and contributed to a sweep of Cook County offices by Democrats.

In 1989, Stone unsuccessfully sought the Republican nomination for Mayor of Chicago, to unseat Mayor Sawyer. Richard M. Daley defeated Sawyer in the Democratic primary and Republican nominee Edward Vrdolyak in the general election to become mayor. In 1990, Stone returned to the Democratic Party.

=== "Berny's Wall" ===
Although resident and corporate relations between Chicago and neighboring suburb Evanston are generally cordial and co-operative, Stone was a protagonist in perhaps the most significant altercation in recent decades. The Evanston City Council adopted the Southwest II Tax Increment Financing (TIF) District, also called the Howard-Hartrey TIF, on April 27, 1992, in order to incent the development of a disused 23-acre Bell and Howell distribution center. A city contractor installed a $150,000, 2.5 feet (0.76 m) high, three-block-long, continuous steel guardrail down the middle of Howard Street, from Kedzie Avenue to California Avenue, blocking vehicles from crossing between Evanston and Chicago, to protect residents from the vehicular traffic expected at a proposed shopping center on the Evanston side of Howard Street that was projected to open in 1995. A Cook County Circuit Court judge denied Evanston's request for a restraining order to halt the erection of the barrier, which became known in the media as "Berny's Wall". The Chicago Tribune editorialized calling Stone "silly" and the guardrail a "senseless idea...just an insipid ploy by a useless alderman who has too much time on his hands and too much of the taxpayers' money at his disposal".

On May 28, 1993, Evanston Mayor Lorraine H. Morton, Chicago Mayor Richard M. Daley, Stone, and city officials met at Chicago City Hall, and hours later, Morton announced that Evanston would drop legal action against Chicago. The next day, after consultation with Evanston's corporation counsel and others, Evanston announced they would continue legal recourse in conjunction with negotiations. Stone demanded that Evanston pick up the cost of the installation and removal of the guardrail. On June 1, 1993, the Evanston City Council voted to refuse to contribute funds, to continue their lawsuit, and to defer modifications to the site plan until the barrier was dismantled.

Testimony began July 25, 1994. Chicago Transportation Commissioner Joseph Boyle Jr. and Planning Commissioner Valerie Jarrett testified that the guardrail had been installed at Stone's request without the benefit of traffic or planning studies. A partner of the shopping center's construction firm testified that Stone had discussed with him in 1992 the idea of siting the project on vacant land near the Lincoln Village Shopping Center, a site that was scheduled to be redistricted into the 50th Ward in 1995. Evanston officials said Stone was jealous of the project going to Evanston. On September 21, 1994, the judge ruled that the March 25, 1993, resolution which Stone ushered through the Chicago City Council authorized Chicago's Department of Transportation commissioner to consider a barrier, declared that the department had no authority to install the guardrail, ordered Chicago to remove it and pay all costs including Evanston's legal fees, and dismissed Chicago's countersuit to block the shopping center. Chicago's request for a stay pending appeal was denied, Bell and Howell agreed to pay the estimated $35,000 to remove the barrier, and removal began on October 4, 1994. "The party isn't over until the fat man sings, and I'm the fat man", said Stone. The Chicago Tribune editorialized calling the barrier "a petty, indulgent waste of money at the people's expense".

Stone passed legislation through the Chicago City Council to change to one-way, northbound only, portions of Kedzie and Sacramento Avenues, two Chicago streets south of the shopping center. After the changes were implemented November 10, 1994, Stone's office received numerous complaints, and by November 16 Kedzie was again a two-way street.

On November 3, 1999, the City of Chicago established the Lincoln Avenue TIF district, including the Lincoln Village Shopping Center area.

=== Sleeping in Council Chambers ===
Chicago Alderman Bernard L. Stone (50th) at his desk in Chicago City Council Chambers, January 2004

A photograph of Stone asleep in Council Chambers, during a hearing on an ordinance restricting the use of a cell phone while operating an automobile, ran on the front page of the Chicago Sun-Times in January 2004. "Some aldermen have a tendency while they're thinking to close their eyes and that may register with their constituency as not paying attention or, perhaps, even sleeping during the session", Stone later explained. Stone fell asleep at his desk in Council Chambers in City Hall during the City Council's Finance Committee debate on the controversial parking meter lease in December 2008 and was photographed by the press. Stone was videotaped sleeping during a Finance Committee hearing on the transparency of the city's tax increment financing program in March 2009.

=== Campaign employees convicted of vote fraud ===
On September 4, 2007, speaking from the floor of Council Chambers during a meeting of the Buildings Committee, Stone warned fellow aldermen of an ongoing investigation into absentee balloting. On January 28, 2008, two employees of Stone's 2007 re-election campaign were arrested and charged with improperly influencing voters, primarily from the ward's Indian and Pakistani communities, to vote absentee for Stone. Anish Eapen, a precinct captain and a ward superintendent with the city's Streets and Sanitation Department, was charged with "official misconduct, absentee ballot fraud, and mutilation of election materials". Eapen allegedly partnered with Armando Ramos, an unemployed student, who was also charged with absentee ballot fraud and mutilation of election materials. Stone accused the state attorney's office of acting at the behest of the area's U.S. Representative, Jan Schakowsky. "We know where this all started. We know it's politically based. ... Her [Schakowsky's] aide was soliciting the state's attorney to investigate. It's absolutely a devious political trick", he said. Schakowsky denied involvement. Bond was set at $50,000 and $40,000 for Eapen and Ramos, respectively.

City Inspector General David H. Hoffman called for Eapen to be fired. For nearly two years, Eapen was on paid administrative leave from his $83,940-a-year job with the city. On October 8, 2009, Streets and Sanitation Department Commissioner Tom Byrne found Eapen a job tracking equipment. Stone blamed Byrne's predecessor for Eapen's paid leave, saying "Mike Picardi has no cojones".

On October 24, 2008, during the annual budget hearing process, Inspector General Hoffman testified before the Committee on the Budget of the Chicago City Council. "It is my intent, Mr. Inspector General, to wipe your entire office out of the budget", Stone told Hoffman. "It is my intent to submit a budget amendment which will destroy your department". "He's come after me, so I'm going after him. That's the way the game is played", Stone said. Stone's amendment came before the Budget Committee on November 17, 2008, and was tabled 14–2.

Eapen and Ramos waived their right to trial by jury. In a bench trial, four members of a family who lived in the ward testified that Eapen came to their homes, watched as they completed the absentee ballot applications and absentee ballots, collected their ballots, and mailed them. One family member, who was not registered to vote, testified that Eapen filled out her ballot and she signed it. Another witness testified that when she told Stone in his office that Ramos filled out her ballot, Stone was dismissive, saying, "This meeting is over". Stone commented on the testimony, "I have no recollection of what she is talking about".

On June 24, 2010, Cook County Judge Marcus Salone found Eapen and Ramos each guilty on one count of attempted mutilation of voting materials and additional counts of attempted absentee ballot violations. On August 4, 2010, Salone sentenced Eapen and Ramos to prison terms of 364 days and 270 days, respectively. Salone said "I think the evidence is overwhelming. The reality is that Mr. Eapen and Mr. Ramos attempted to steal democracy and they did it in a vicious way". Stone called the case "a witch hunt", said that Ramos and Eapen were "political prisoners", and compared their crimes to "spitting on the sidewalk". Stone said Inspector General Hoffman targeted his staff while failing to investigate other aldermen's staffs. "They are not the ones who attempted to steal democracy. The one who attempted to steal democracy was David Hoffman", Stone said. "This is a miscarriage of justice".

=== Committees ===
Stone was the Chairman of the City Council Committee on Buildings, and also served on the following City Council committees: Budget and Government Operations, Finance, Historical Landmark Preservation, Housing and Landmark Preservation, Traffic Control and Safety, and the Committee on Committees.

=== Loss in 2011 run-off ===
In 2008, Illinois State Senator Ira Silverstein defeated Stone in the voting for the 50th Ward Democratic committeeman, an unpaid party post. In February 2011, in a five-way race for alderman including Silverstein's wife, Certified Public Accountant Debra Silverstein, no candidate garnered 50% plus one of the vote, forcing a run-off. In the April 2011 run-off, Debra Silverstein prevailed with 62% of the vote to 38% for Stone. On election night, Stone said Silverstein would be "a disaster for this ward. There's no way I'll help her. She knows nothing". Stone's tenure as alderman spanned seven Chicago Mayors, including two Mayors Daley.

== Political philosophy ==
Stone stated his political philosophy as "You take care of the people who take care of you – you know, the people who voted for you. That's not Chicago politics, that's Politics 101".

== Legacy ==
In 2017 a 1.8 acre greenspace along the North Shore Channel just south of Devon Avenue in the 50th ward was dedicated Berny Stone Park.

== Personal life ==
Stone married his wife, Lois (d. 1995), in 1949. They had three daughters and a son.

Stone worshipped at Congregation Ezras Israel and served on their Board of Directors. Stone also served on the board of directors for the Bernard Horwich Jewish Community Center, the Associated Talmud Torahs, and the Jewish National Fund.

In 2003, Stone's son, Jay, unsuccessfully challenged incumbent 32nd Ward Alderman Theodore Matlak. Stone supported Matlak, calling his son "an embarrassment" who "doesn't know what he's doing". Father and son remained on good terms.

Stone died on December 22, 2014, at age 87 from complications from a fall. Stone was remembered by the Chicago Tribune and Chicago Sun-Times as "outspoken"; by Chicago Mayor Rahm Emanuel as "fiercely loyal to his constituents"; and in a City Council resolution as "a vigorous advocate for the people of the 50th Ward".
