= Council Wars =

Political conflict in Chicago from 1983 to 1986

The Council Wars were a racially polarized political conflict in the city of Chicago from 1983 to 1986, centered on the Chicago City Council. The term came from a satirical comedy sketch of the same name written and performed by comedian and journalist Aaron Freeman in 1983, using the good vs. evil plot line of the film Star Wars as a device.

== History ==
In 1983, U.S. Representative Harold Washington was elected Mayor of Chicago. Washington, who became the city's first Black mayor, was backed by reformist "independent" Democrats and dissident Black aldermen. He had won the Democratic primary in a three-way contest against incumbent mayor Jane Byrne and State's Attorney Richard M. Daley, son of the late mayor Richard J. Daley.

Regular Democrats won most of the 50 aldermanic seats in the city council. Washington garnered the support of all 16 Black aldermen, even those who had been organization supporters. He also had the support of four White reformers and one other White alderman, Burton Natarus, who had been a loyal organization man but whose 42nd Ward voted for Washington.

The other 29 aldermen (28 White and 1 Hispanic) formed an opposition group led by Aldermen Ed Vrdolyak and Edward M. Burke, together known as "the Eddies". The "Vrdolyak 29" voted as a solid bloc. In the first session of the 1983-1987 term, the "Vrdolyak 29" voted themselves complete control of every Council committee. Over the next three years, they passed the mayor's budgets, but voted down all of the mayor's proposals. They also voted down all of his appointments, so the appointees could only serve as interim officeholders.

The Vrdolyak 29 had a majority of votes, but not enough to override Washington's veto, thus creating legislative gridlock. Chicago became known as "Beirut by the Lake", a reference to the Lebanese Civil War of the 1980s.

Meanwhile, Washington's allies sued the city in Federal court, claiming that the ward map drawn up after the 1980 Census had unfairly dispersed Black and Hispanic voters. At that time, White voters were about 40% of the city's population, Black voters were also about 40%, and Hispanic voters were about 15%, but there were 33 White aldermen, only 16 Black aldermen, and just 1 Hispanic aldermen.

In 1986, the court ruled in their favor, ordering modifications to the borders of seven wards, and also special elections in the modified wards. Washington's supporters gained three seats in the special elections; six weeks later, the election of Luis Gutiérrez in the 26th Ward gave the mayor 25 supportive aldermen. 25 votes in the city council do not suffice to pass legislation, but allow the mayor to cast a deciding 26th vote. A group of several remaining aldermen from the Vrdolyak 29, including Alderman Richard Mell, went to Washington to promise future cooperation. They claimed that their previous opposition had been forced on them by the Eddies. The majority of the city council now aligned with the mayor, and Council Wars ended.

Washington defeated Vrdolyak in the 1987 mayoral election, and in the same election, several pro-Washington challengers defeated incumbent opposition aldermen. Washington died of a heart attack later that year, with Alderman David Orr becoming interim mayor. The council then selected a permanent replacement to serve until a special election. They chose Alderman Eugene Sawyer, a Regular Democrat who sided with Washington during Council Wars. He was elected by a coalition of former Vrdolyak 29 and original pro-Washington aldermen as well as new aldermen.

== Disposition of the Council 1983–86 ==
Below is a list of aldermen from 1983. Pro-Washington aldermen are marked with a W; those in the Vrdolyak 29 are marked with a V.

Ward	Name	Party	Race	Alliance
1	Fred Roti	Democratic	White	V
2	Bobby Rush	Democratic	Black	W
3	Tyrone Kenner, Dorothy Tillman	Democratic	Black	W
4	Timothy C. Evans	Democratic	Black	W
5	Lawrence Bloom	Democratic	White	W
6	Eugene Sawyer	Democratic	Black	W
7	William Beavers	Democratic	Black	W
8	Marian Humes	Democratic	Black	W
9	Perry Hutchinson	Democratic	Black	W
10	Edward Vrdolyak	Democratic	White	V
11	Patrick Huels	Democratic	White	V
12	Aloysius Majerczyk	Democratic	White	V
13	John Madrzyk	Democratic	White	V
14	Edward M. Burke	Democratic	White	V
15	Frank Brady	Democratic	White	V
16	Anna Langford	Democratic	Black	W
17	Allan Streeter	Democratic	Black	W
18	Robert Kellam	Democratic	White	V
19	Michael F. Sheahan	Democratic	White	V
20	Clifford Kelley	Democratic	Black	W
21	Niles Sherman	Democratic	Black	W
22	Frank Stemberk	Democratic	White	V
23	William Krystyniak	Democratic	White	V
24	William Henry	Democratic	Black	W
25	Vito Marzullo	Democratic	White	V
26	Michael Nardulli	Democratic	White	V
27	Wallace Davis, Jr.	Democratic	Black	W
28	Ed Smith	Democratic	Black	W
29	Danny K. Davis	Democratic	Black	W
30	George Hagopian	Democratic	White	V
31	Miguel Santiago	Democratic	Hispanic	V
32	Terry Gabinski	Democratic	White	V
33	Richard Mell	Democratic	White	V
34	Wilson Frost	Democratic	Black	W
35	Joseph Kotlarz, Jr.	Democratic	White	V
36	William Banks	Democratic	White	V
37	Frank Damato	Democratic	White	V
38	Thomas Cullerton	Democratic	White	V
39	Anthony Laurino	Democratic	White	V
40	Patrick J. O'Connor	Democratic	White	V
41	Roman Pucinski	Democratic	White	V
42	Burton Natarus	Democratic	White	W
43	Martin J. Oberman	Democratic	White	W
44	Bernard Hansen	Democratic	White	V
45	Gerald McLaughlin	Democratic	White	V
46	Jerome M. Orbach	Democratic	White	V
47	Eugene Schulter	Democratic	White	V
48	Marion Volini	Democratic	White	W
49	David Orr	Democratic	White	W
50	Bernard Stone	Democratic	White	V
