= Scott Waguespack =

American politician (born 1970)

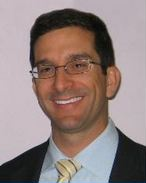

Member of the Chicago City Council from the 32nd ward
- Incumbent
- Assumed office May 21, 2007
- Preceded by: Theodore Matlak

Personal details
- Born: June 23, 1970 (age 56)
- Party: Democratic
- Spouse: Jade
- Children: 2
- Education: Colorado State University, Fort Collins (BA); Illinois Institute of Technology (JD)

Scott Waguespack (born June 23, 1970) is a member of the Chicago City Council, representing the 32nd ward since May 2007. The current 32nd ward includes parts of the neighborhoods of Wicker Park, Bucktown, Goose Island, Hamlin Park, Lakeview, Lincoln Park, and Roscoe Village.

== Early life and education ==
Waguespack earned his undergraduate degree in political science at Colorado State University and a Juris Doctor degree from Chicago-Kent College of Law, Illinois Institute of Technology. After college, he was in the U.S. Peace Corps in Kenya. Waguespack also worked with the U.S. State Department, the American Bar Association, and various governments in the Balkans working to assist the War Crimes Tribunal in the former Yugoslavia, establishing a rule of law, and working on economic development. He served as an advisor to the President of Kosovo and the interim government after the end of the Kosovo War.

Waguespack was the city administrator and chief of staff to Berwyn, Illinois mayor Michael A. O'Connor in 2005.

== Aldermanic career ==
Waguespack was first elected as Chicago alderman for the 32nd Ward in 2007, unseating incumbent alderman Ted Matlak. He has subsequently been reelected in 2011, 2015, 2019, and 2023.

He is a founding member of the Chicago City Council's Progressive Reform Coalition, and has chaired the Progressive Reform Caucus from 2015 to 2019. Waguespack is the Democratic Committeeman for the 32nd ward.

In the 2019 Chicago mayoral election, Waguespack endorsed Lori Lightfoot, publicly declaring his support of her candidacy in advance of the first round of the election. Waguespack was a City Council ally of Lightfoot during her mayoralty. He endorsed her for reelection in the 2023 Chicago mayoral election. During Lightfoot's mayoralty, Waguespack chaired the City Council's Committee on Finance.

In January 2020, Waguespack proposed legislation that would have placed limits on single-use plastics and foam food containers by giving restaurants and take-out establishments until January 1, 2021, to stop selling or serving food in polystyrene containers and limit use of plastic utensils and straws.

Waguespack currently serves on the following committees – Aviation, Committees and Rules, Economic, Capital and Technology Development, Ethics and Government Oversight, Finance, License and Consumer Protection, Special Events, Cultural Affairs and Recreation, and Transportation and Public Way.

=== Parking Meter Deal ===
To close the City of Chicago's 2009 budget deficit, Mayor Richard M. Daley proposed leasing Chicago's parking meters to a private investor for 75 years in exchange for a one-time $1.15 billion payment, most of which was spent in the next two years. Despite only a few days between the introduction of the Chicago Metered Parking System Concession Agreement and its passage, Waguespack was one of only five members of the City Council who voted against it. Waguespack conducted an independent study of the sale, later cited in the City of Chicago Inspector General's report on the sale, concluding that the $1.15 billion paid in the contract was substantially less than the actual value of the asset over the proposed time period.

=== Housing and Zoning ===
In 2012, Waguespack pushed to reduce the number of units in a proposed apartment building on the site of a gas station on North and Hermitage avenues. Initially proposed to be a five-story building with 44 units, Waguespack pushed to scale it down to a 30-unit 4-story building.

In 2017, Waguespack blocked a proposed 6-story 27-unit apartment building on a vacant industrial lot at 1894 N. Milwaukee Ave in his district. Waguespack had concerns about the height of the building.

In 2024, Waguespack sought his aldermanic privilege to block a 615-unit apartment building (of which 124 units were affordable housing) on the lot of a former industrial site in an area of Lincoln Park formerly served by 2nd ward Alderman Brian Hopkins. Waguespack offered various explanations for opposing the project, including pushback from the local Ranch Triangle neighborhood association related to density and traffic, as well as criticism that the developer received tax breaks for including affordable housing units. In July 2025, Waguespack dropped his opposition to the development at 1840 N. Marcey Street, which was revised to include two separate buildings of 19 and 16 stories and a total of 590 units.

=== Government Transparency ===
Since his inauguration in 2007, Waguespack has been dedicated to government transparency and ethics reform. In 2009, Waguespack and Alderman Manny Flores passed the TIF Sunshine Ordinance, establishing transparency requirements around Chicago's TIF districts.

Upon assuming the role of chair of the City Council's Committee on Finance in 2019, a position long held by Alderman Ed Burke, Waguespack began reforming the committee's handling of worker's compensation, reducing headcount, and reducing spending.

Waguespack has been a frequent critic of Mayor Brandon Johnson's administration, especially of his ethics practices. In response to Johnson's continued employment with Chicago Public Schools, Waguespack introduced an ordinance in early 2025 prohibiting the mayor and other executive officials from dual employment with sister agencies. Waguespack also introduced a resolution with City Clerk Anna Valencia calling for more oversight of mayoral appointments to boards and commissions.

== Electoral history ==
Chicago 32nd ward aldermanic general election, 2007
Party	Candidate	Votes	%
Nonpartisan	Ted Matlak (incumbent)	3,799	46.86
Nonpartisan	Scott Waguespack	3,186	39.30
Nonpartisan	Catherine A. Zaryczny	1,122	13.84
Total votes		8,107	100

Chicago 32nd ward aldermanic runoff election, 2007
Party	Candidate	Votes	%
Nonpartisan	Scott Waguespack	4,179	50.73
Nonpartisan	Ted Matlak (incumbent)	4,058	49.27
Total votes		8,237	100

Chicago 32nd ward aldermanic general election, 2011
Party	Candidate	Votes	%
Nonpartisan	Scott Waguespack (incumbent)	8,845	65.83
Nonpartisan	David M. Pavlik	2,322	17.28
Nonpartisan	Brian P. Lynch	1,489	11.08
Nonpartisan	Brian Gorman	781	5.81
Total votes		13,437	100

Chicago 32nd ward aldermanic general election, 2015
Party	Candidate	Votes	%
Nonpartisan	Scott Waguespack (incumbent)	6,425	78.95
Nonpartisan	Elise Doody-Jones	1,713	21.05
Total votes		8,138	100

Chicago 32nd ward aldermanic general election, 2019
Party	Candidate	Votes	%
Nonpartisan	Scott Waguespack (incumbent)	11,519	100
Total votes		11,519	100

Chicago 32nd ward aldermanic general election, 2023
Party	Candidate	Votes	%
Nonpartisan	Scott Waguespack (incumbent)	12,537	100
Total votes		12,537	100

== See also ==
- List of Chicago alderpersons since 1923
