= Claude Holman =

American lawyer and politician (1904–1973)

Member of the Chicago City Council from the 4th ward
- In office 1955 – June 1, 1973
- Preceded by: Abraham H. Cohen
- Succeeded by: Timothy C. Evans

Personal details
- Born: January 31, 1904 Topeka, Kansas
- Died: June 1, 1973 (aged 69) Chicago, Illinois
- Party: Democratic Party

Claude Holman (January 31, 1904 – June 1, 1973) was an American lawyer and politician.

Holman was born in Topeka, Kansas. He went to Crane Junior College and Loyola University Chicago. Holman received his law degree from John Marshall Law School in 1934. He was admitted to the Illinois bar and practiced law in Chicago, Illinois. He served as a secretary for United States Representative Arthur Mitchell for two years. Holman was involved with the Democratic Party. Holman served on the Chicago City Council from 1955 until his death in 1973, representing the 4th ward on the South Side. Holman was closely aligned with Mayor Richard J. Daley's Cook County Democratic Party. Holman died from a heart attack at his home in Chicago, Illinois.

In 1964, Holman started a weekly African-American newspaper called the News Clarion or South Side News-Clarion. It published until at least 1967. The News Clarion advertised itself as “Chicago’s Fastest Growing Newspaper, Serving Chicago & Cook County Southside.” Only one issue of the News Clarion is known to survive, consisting of 12 pages.
