= Theodore Matlak =

American alderman (born 1965)

Ted Matlak

Member of the Chicago City Council from the 32nd ward
- In office May 20, 1998 – May 21, 2007
- Preceded by: Terry Gabinski
- Succeeded by: Scott Waguespack

Personal details
- Born: Theodore Anthony Matlak; May 16, 1965 (age 61) Lincoln Park, Chicago, Illinois
- Party: Democratic
- Spouse: Gail Matlak (m.1991)
- Children: Two daughters
- Education: DePaul University (BA)
- Profession: Politician; Real Estate Broker

Ted Matlak (born May 16, 1965) was the alderman of the 32nd ward in Chicago from 1998 until 2007. On April 17, 2007, Matlak lost to challenger Scott Waguespack in a close aldermanic race.

== Background ==
Matlak was born in Chicago near the 2500 block of Marshfield in a tavern to Priscilla Gordon and the son of Polish immigrants, Theodore Matlak Sr. His younger sister now resides there with her children and his parents. Matlak was appointed alderman by former alderman Theris Gabinski and was an intern to ex-Congressman Dan Rostenkowski while attending page school in Washington D.C. He graduated from Gordon College Prep, and originally intended on joining the U.S. army. Unfortunately, health issues relating to his kidneys prevented such a career, and he instead proceeded to attend DePaul University in Chicago, where he received an accounting degree. In 1991, he married Gail and later he had 2 daughters: Emily and Aubrey Matlak.

Matlak has received two kidney transplants: one in 1993 and one in 2004.

== Politics ==
=== Early career ===
He had interned with Dan Rostenkowski and worked in the ward office of former alderman Terry Gabinski.

=== Aldermanic career ===
Matlak served as 32nd ward alderman in Chicago for nine years, from 1998 to 2007.

He was appointed in 1998 by Mayor Richard M. Daley to finish the term of Theris Gabinski, and was elected outright in 1999. He subsequently was again reelected in 2003. In 2003, his challenger was Jay Stone, son of 50th ward alderman Bernard Stone. Bernard Stone not only supported Matlak, but publicly criticized his son for running. In 2007 opponent was newcomer Scott Waguespack, who beat him in a tight race by only 121 votes in 2007. Among some of his accomplishments during his aldermanic career were having several Chicago Public Parks built and having a new Chicago Public Library built.

=== Subsequent political endeavors ===
Matlak lost the February 2, 2010 Democratic Primary Election for Commissioner of the 12th District of the Cook County Board to politician John Fritchey.

== Electoral history ==
1999 Chicago 32nd Ward aldermanic election
Party	Candidate	Votes	%
Nonpartisan	Theodore A. Matlak (incumbent)	6,725	54.34
Nonpartisan	Lorna Brett	4,019	32.47
Nonpartisan	Peter Donoghue	1,512	12.22
Nonpartisan	Richard T. Eilenberger	121	0.98
Total votes		12,377	100

2003 Chicago 32nd Ward aldermanic election
Party	Candidate	Votes	%
Nonpartisan	Ted Matlak (incumbent)	5,518	73.80
Nonpartisan	Jay Stone	1,959	26.20
Total votes		7,477	100

2007 Chicago 32nd Ward aldermanic election
Candidates	General Election		Runoff Election	
	Votes	%	Votes	%
Scott Waguespack	3,186	39.30	4,179	50.73
Ted Matlak (incumbent)	3,799	46.86	4,058	49.27
Catherine A. Zaryczny	1,122	13.84		
Total	8,107	100	8,237	100

2007 Cook County Board 12th district Democratic primary
Party	Candidate	Votes	%
Democratic	John A. Fritchey	19,878	75.32
Democratic	Ted Matlak	6,512	24.68
Total votes		26,390	100
