= Edward M. Burke =

American politician from Chicago

Ed Burke
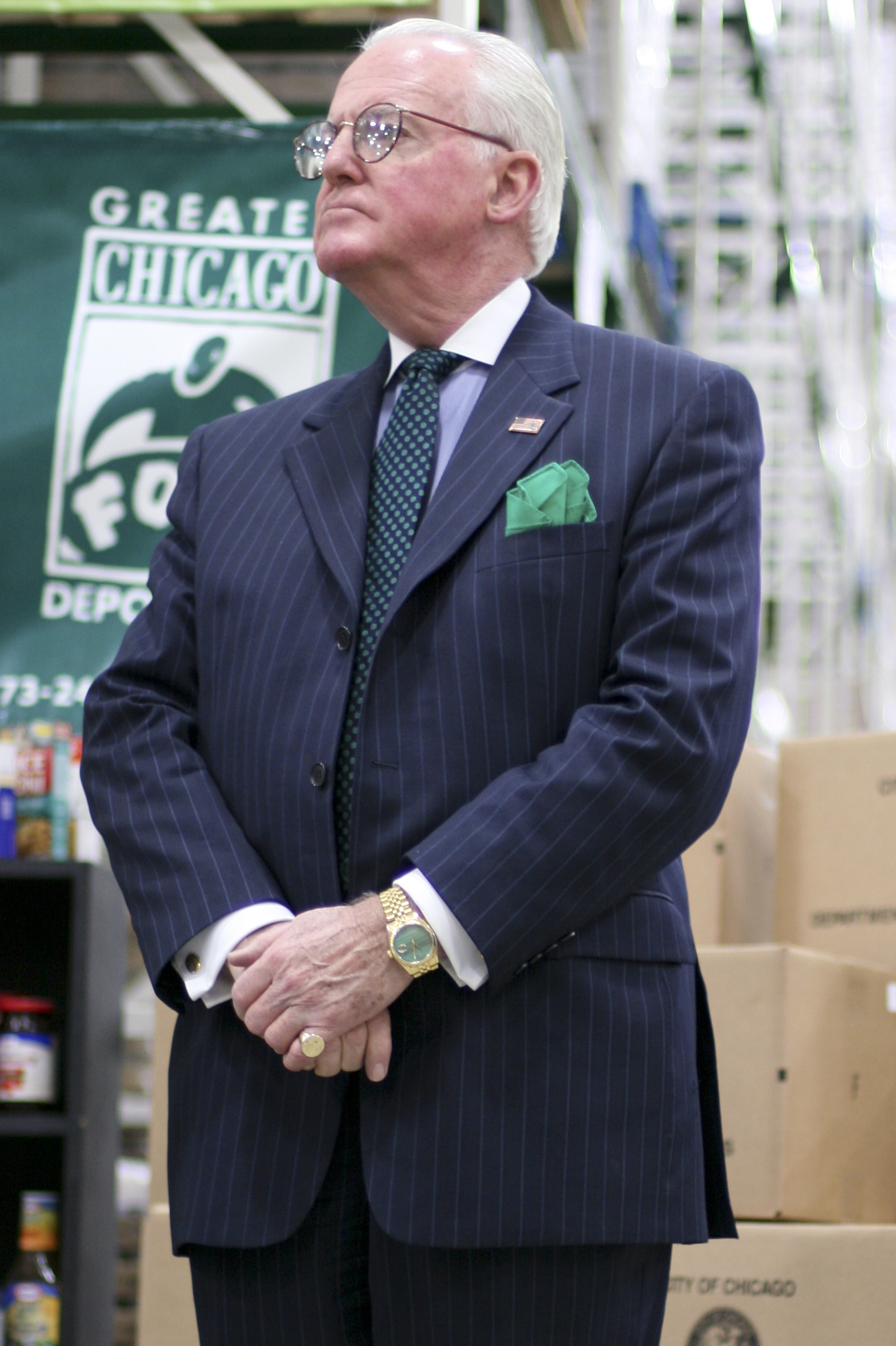
- Burke in 2009

Member of the Chicago City Council from the 14th ward
- In office March 14, 1969 – May 15, 2023
- Preceded by: Joseph P. Burke
- Succeeded by: Jeylú Gutiérrez

Personal details
- Born: Edward Michael Burke; December 29, 1943 (age 82) Chicago, Illinois, U.S.
- Party: Democratic
- Spouse: Anne McGlone (m. 1968)
- Children: 5
- Relatives: Daniel J. Burke (brother)
- Education: DePaul University (BA, JD)

Edward Michael Burke (born December 29, 1943) is an American politician and convicted felon who served as the alderman of Chicago's 14th ward from 1969 to 2023. A member of the Democratic Party, he was first elected to the Chicago City Council in 1969, and represented part of the city's Southwest Side. While the chair of the Council's Committee on Finance, Burke had been called Chicago's "most powerful alderman" by the Chicago Sun-Times. Burke was named one of the "100 Most Powerful Chicagoans" by Chicago Magazine, describing him as "[o]ne of the last of the old-school Chicago Machine pols."

Burke is the longest-serving alderman in Chicago history. Despite gaining prominence in Chicago politics, Burke was known to clash with the "old guard" of Mayor Richard J. Daley and often aligned with fellow Councilman Ed Vrdolyak. Along with Vrdolyak, he was a leader of the "Vrdolyak 29" during the first term of Mayor Harold Washington, the "Council Wars" era. Burke and his staff were the subjects of federal and local investigations, and members of his staff were the targets of indictments and convictions involving payroll and contracting irregularities. Burke opted not to run in the 2023 election, ending a record 14-term tenure on the City Council.

Burke was the lead partner with Klafter & Burke, a law firm specializing in property tax appeals; it has served clients who do business with the city and also provided services to U.S. president Donald Trump. As of August 2019, Burke is no longer a partner with the law firm.

On November 29, 2018, Burke's office at Chicago City Hall and his aldermanic ward office were seized by federal agents, who ejected staff and papered over the doors and windows. On January 3, 2019, Burke was charged with attempted extortion for allegedly using his political office to drive business for his law firm. On December 21, 2023, Burke was found guilty by a federal jury on 13 of 14 counts of racketeering, bribery, and extortion. On June 24, 2024, Burke was sentenced to two years in prison and a $2 million fine. On June 8, 2025, Burke was transferred from prison to community confinement, where he served the remainder of his sentence at a halfway house. His time under supervised release would end on February 20, 2026.

Burke's wife is former Illinois Supreme Court Justice Anne M. Burke. He and his wife were foster parents and were party to a protracted, highly publicized, racially charged child custody dispute.

== Early life ==
Burke is a lifelong resident of Chicago. His father, Joseph P. Burke, was a Cook County Sheriff's policeman who worked as a court bailiff. Joseph Burke served as committeeman from the 14th Ward (a local Democratic Party post), and was elected alderman from the 14th Ward in November 1953.

Ed Burke attended Visitation Grammar School in Visitation Parish on Chicago's South Side and is a 1961 graduate of Quigley Preparatory Seminary. He graduated with a bachelor's degree from DePaul University in 1965, then worked for three years as a Chicago police officer, assigned to the state's attorney's office. Meanwhile, he studied law at DePaul University College of Law. In 1968, Burke received a Juris Doctor degree, was admitted to the Illinois Bar, and married his wife, Anne Marie.

While in law school in the late 1960s, an era of escalation in the Vietnam War, Burke received a draft deferment as a full-time student. After his marriage and the death of his father, he applied for and was granted a hardship deferment (3-A), as the sole support of his wife, mother, and two younger brothers. In June 1969, the Illinois Selective Service board of appeals reclassified him 1-A ("available for unrestricted military service"). At the same time, he was accepted into a Chicago-based United States Army Reserve unit, the 363rd civil affairs group, as a private. Political rivals expressed concern that special consideration allowed Burke to join the Reserve unit ahead of others, but an Army investigation found no evidence of manipulation in his favor.

== Democratic committeeman ==
Burke succeeded his father in local politics, first as Democratic Committeeman and then as alderman from the 14th Ward. After the elder Burke died in office of cancer on May 11, 1968, Edward Burke took leave from his job as a policeman to replace his father as Democratic committeeman for the 14th Ward. Though not a precinct captain, Burke won election to his father's committeeman seat in a secret vote of 65 precinct captains, defeating a veteran precinct captain by just 3½ votes. At 24, Burke was the youngest person in Chicago's history to become a ward committeeman, a position he held until he was defeated by State Representative Aaron Ortiz on March 17, 2020.

== Chicago aldermanship ==
The 14th Ward Democrats slated the young Burke as the Democratic candidate in a special election called for on March 11, 1969, to fill vacancies in city council, including the 14th Ward. Burke faced six opponents, but won with a majority of 11,204 votes; the first runner-up received 1460 votes. He was sworn in by Mayor Richard J. Daley on March 14. Following the 1971 aldermanic elections, the Council approved the appointment of Burke, who was at the time a police sergeant on leave, as chairman of the Police and Fire Committee. In 1972 and 1973, Burke joined Alderman Edward Vrdolyak in a dissident caucus of aldermen demanding a greater voice in city affairs from Daley and finance committee chairman Thomas Keane. The dissident aldermen were labelled the "Young Turks", and their caucus was called the "coffee rebellion" after the beverage served at their morning meetings. In the backroom of the city council chamber, Burke once threatened to punch Alderman Leon Despres in the nose if Despres had not been as old as he was.

Former city commissioner of consumer affairs Jane Byrne announced her challenge to Chicago Mayor Michael Bilandic on April 24, 1978, describing herself as an alternative to a "cabal of evil men [that] [had] fastened onto the government of the City of Chicago", and, when pressed to name them, singled out Burke and Vrdolyak. However, during her mayoralty, Byrne would ultimately work together with Burke and Vrdolyak.

Having been first elected in a 1969 special election, Burke was since reelected thirteen times, in 1971, 1975, 1979, 1983, 1987, 1991, 1995, 1999, 2003, 2007, 2011, 2015, and 2019; he was unopposed in most of his re-election campaigns. In 2007, Burke faced his first opponent since 1971, a school teacher who had never run for office. A Burke supporter unsuccessfully challenged the validity of the opponent's ballot application, but the case was tied up in court for most of the campaign, and Burke won nearly 90% of the vote.

Burke did not seek reelection in 2023 and retired after completing his thirteenth full term.

=== Leader of opposition to Mayor Washington ===
Burke was, along with Alderman Edward Vrdolyak, a leader of the "Vrdolyak 29", a city council majority voting block, which included 28 white and one Puerto Rican aldermen, who opposed the agenda of the newly elected Mayor Harold Washington, Chicago's first black mayor, during Washington's first three years as mayor, 1983–1986, a period referred to as the Council Wars. Vrdolyak, a Burke mentor, was chairman of the Cook County Democratic Party. Vrdolyak forged the alliance by expanding the number of city council committees to 29 and negotiating 29 committee chairmanship assignments. On May 2, 1983, during the first city council meeting of the Washington administration, the mayor and some aldermen left the meeting, Vrdolyak was President pro tempore of the city council (chair of city council meetings when the mayor is not present) so he continued the meeting. Burke was chosen to chair the powerful Finance Committee.

Burke assumed a vocal role in anti-Washington attacks and was considered second to Vrdolyak in the anti-Washington caucus. Burke sued in Cook County Circuit Court to remove Washington from office, contending that Washington forfeited his office by being three weeks late in filing a routine financial disclosure by the deadline set by state law. The suit was dismissed. Burke asked Illinois Attorney General Neil Hartigan to seek the ouster of Washington. The request was denied. Richard M. Daley, Cook County States Attorney at the time, pleaded for unity, saying, "This personal hatred has gone too far."

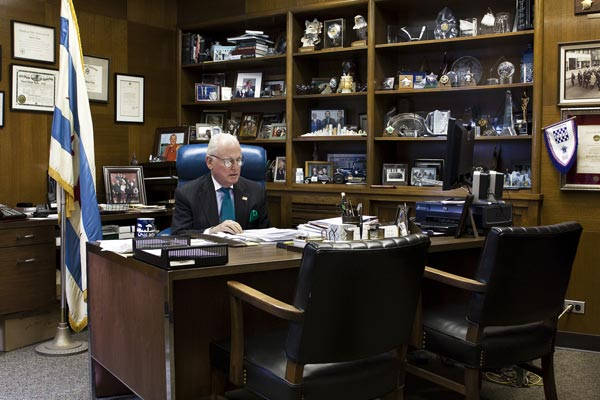
Burke at his desk in his ward office

In the spring of 1987, in Chicago's municipal elections, Vrdolyak, rather than seeking re-election as alderman, was the Solidarity Party's candidate challenging Washington for mayor. Washington won re-election, and Washington allies won twenty-five city council seats. Burke led opposition in the city council, but Washington supporter Alderman Timothy C. Evans replaced Burke as Chairman of the Committee on Finance. Ousted from the spacious Finance Committee staff offices, Burke never used the relatively modest office allocated to him in City Hall and instead worked out of his private law office two blocks away. In the days following the death of Mayor Washington in office, Burke supported the Council's selection of Alderman Eugene Sawyer over Evans to serve as mayor. Sawyer prevailed, but Burke was the alderman who least often voted in support of the legislative agenda of Sawyer, Chicago's second black mayor. After Richard M. Daley was elected mayor in the spring of 1989, Daley nominated Burke as Finance chairman, a position he had held until January 4, 2019, a day after he was charged with attempted exortion of a Burger King operator to gain more property tax appeal business for his private law firm, Klafter & Burke.

The chairmanship of the city council's Committee on Finance has been described as "the No. 2 spot in city government". Almost all expenditures, tax matters, and many city contracts must be recommended by the Finance Committee before they can be considered by the full Council. As Chairman of the Committee on Finance, Burke controlled a 63-member staff and $2.2-million annual budget, dwarfing the resources of other council committees. In the city's self-managed workers' compensation program, the Finance Committee determines and approves payment amounts in disability claims. As Chairman of the Committee on Finance, Burke controls a $1.3M per year taxpayer-funded payroll account available to aldermen with no scrutiny. In 2008, Burke spent the largest portion of the account, $70,164, more than any other alderman by more than $26,000. Burke is also a member of the city council's committees on Aviation; Budget and Government Operation; Energy, Environmental Protection and Public Utilities; and Zoning. Additionally, Burke is a member of the Chicago Planning Commission and Economic Development Commission. He controls three well-funded political action committees, the "Friends of Edward M Burke", the "14th Ward Regular Democratic Organization", and "The Burnham Committee". In July 2009, Burke's campaign funds totaled $3.7 million, higher than any other alderman and one of the largest in Illinois. Illinois judges are elected in partisan elections, and a significant aspect of Burke's influence derives from his role as the longtime chairman of the judicial slating subcommittee of the Cook County Democratic Party.

Burke was a principal draftsman of the map of ward boundaries. When Burke started his political career, the 14th Ward that he represented was centered in the Back of the Yards neighborhood, more than a mile and a half east of its current location. The 14th Ward is a gerrymandered area whose shape has been described as "like a piece of a jigsaw puzzle". With each new ward map, drawn every 10 years, its boundaries have been moved farther west. As of 2010, its boundaries extended from 39th Street south to 59th and from Western Avenue west to Cicero Avenue, including most of the Brighton Park, Gage Park and Archer Heights neighborhoods. The ethnic composition of the ward has changed dramatically during Burke's tenure in office. As of 1968, residents were predominantly of Polish or other Eastern European extraction, but by 2010 it had a large Mexican and Mexican-American population.

Burke maintained a taxpayer-salaried staff to ghost-write speeches, resolutions, and works of non-fiction for him, including Thomas J. O'Gorman, carried on Burke's city council staff payroll as a "legislative aide" since 1995. In October 2006, Burke and O'Gorman published End of Watch, a book detailing the lives and tragedies of police officers who died in the line of duty. Also, Burke and R. Craig Sautter published the book Inside the Wigwam: Chicago Presidential Conventions 1860–1996. Under Burke's direction, the Finance Committee staff compiles historical exhibits in City Hall and drafts honorary resolutions for special visitors to Chicago or recently deceased prominent Americans and Chicagoans. Burke was named "Best Orator at City Hall" in the Chicago Reader's "Best of Chicago 2010" special issue.

=== Ghost payrolling on Burke's staff ===
The staffing practices of Burke's Finance Committee came under scrutiny in local and federal investigations of ghost-payrolling abuses in local government and resulted in several indictments and convictions.

Marie D'Amico, the daughter of Alderman Anthony Laurino of the 39th Ward of Chicago, pleaded guilty to having collected tens of thousands of dollars in no-work jobs between 1981 and 1994 from three separate public agencies: Cook County sheriff, Cook County clerk, and the city council's Finance Committee while Burke was chairman. Burke denied knowing D'Amico rarely showed up for work. Burke said the Finance Committee's chief investigator, who had died in 1994, "apparently connived" with D'Amico to carry D'Amico on the payroll, prompting the Chicago Sun-Times editorial, "Dead Men Can't Wear Stripes". D'Amico was the first indictment in what became a federal investigation of ghost payrolling known as Operation Haunted Hall. In January 1995, the Operation Haunted Hall grand jury subpoenaed the personnel records of three City Council Committees: Finance, Budget and Traffic.

Burke's long-time aldermanic secretary worked full-time out of the downtown office of Burke's law firm, even though her salary was paid by the city. The secretary was subpoenaed by the Operation Haunted Hall grand jury. Alderman Joe Moore asked, "Why is she over at the law firm? It looks bad. It raises the appearance that she's possibly doing not only city work but law firm work." An attorney for the Finance Committee said, "I don't have to explain why she's at the law firm. [Burke] doesn't have to explain. It makes no difference where she sits...She's a city employee and she does city work." The secretary was transferred to City Hall.

Burke's law firm had employed Joseph A. Martinez, a real estate tax appeal attorney, as a full-time partner since about 1977, when in 1981 Mayor Jane Byrne appointed Martinez to replace the resigning 31st Ward Alderman Chester Kuta. Martinez served out the remainder of Kuta's term but declined to run for re-election when the ward committeeman endorsed a challenger. Between 1985 and 1992, Martinez received $91,000 in wages and benefits for doing little or no work for city council committees, and was a target of Operation Haunted Hall. In April 1995, after the federal subpoena of Council committee personnel records, Martinez returned the $91,000, sending cash to City Hall in three installments. He was charged and pleaded guilty on January 23, 1997. In his plea agreement, he admitted he was a ghost payroller on city council committees, starting with the Finance Committee in 1987, and said that he was employed in each committee job "in order to receive health insurance". Martinez's attorney said Burke got Martinez the jobs because Burke's law firm did not provide health insurance. In a statement, Burke wrote, "A memorandum filed in Mr. Martinez's case [has] asserted that I participated in a scheme that gave rise to these charges. This allegation is untrue. I have done nothing wrong in connection with this matter." Pulitzer Prize–winning columnist Mike Royko wrote, "You would think that a bright fellow such as Burke – whose father was a ward boss and an alderman – would know better..."

Burke was corporate secretary of security firm SDI Security, Inc. from shortly after it was formed in 1989 until 1994. Burke hired the President of SDI, Michael A. Pedicone, as an outside lawyer for the Finance Committee. SDI was owned by 11th ward Alderman Patrick Huels, chairman of the Council's Transportation Committee, and Mayor Richard M. Daley's floor leader, and Huels' wife and brother. A federal grand jury subpoenaed Burke's and Huels' campaign finance records and ethics disclosures, and Pedicone's billings. The Attorney Registration and Disciplinary Commission of the Illinois Supreme Court, the state agency that regulates the conduct of attorneys in Illinois, investigated Burke and subpoenaed all records on SDI from the Illinois Department of Professional Regulation. In late December 1997, a grand jury convened by the Cook County State's Attorney's office subpoenaed records on expenditures to SDI from Burke's Finance and Huels' Transportation Committees, notable in that local prosecutors rarely investigate local politicians. In a memo to aldermen, Burke wrote, "He [Pedicone] was not a ghost payroller", and that Pedicone had been paid about $490,000 over eight years for handling more than 450 disability-claim cases. Huels' resignation was the first major public corruption scandal of Daley's first two terms, and editorials called for Burke's resignation as well.

At the sentencing hearing for a Chicago attorney, a federal agent testified that the attorney said that his job with Burke's Finance Committee only required four hours of work a week, although he was paid a full-time salary. On January 8, 1998, federal prosecutors in Operation Haunted Hall indicted another Chicago attorney for collecting $9,223 in wages and benefits from the Finance Committee in 1991 and 1992 despite doing little or no work.

Burke hired criminal defense attorney Anton Valukas, a former United States attorney and a partner in the law firm Jenner and Block, to represent him. Burke was not charged with any wrongdoing in the probe. By 1999, Operation Haunted Hall resulted in 34 guilty pleas, one conviction after trial, and one acquittal.

On December 4, 2008, Illinois State Representative Robert S. Molaro resigned after serving about 15 years in the state legislature, and was eligible to receive a public pension of about $64,000 per year based on the standard of 85% of his roughly $75,000 annual salary. Burke hired the newly retired Molaro for $12,000 for one month to write a 19-page white paper about Chicago's perennially under-funded pensions. When Molaro officially retired on January 1, 2009, his pensionable salary was annualized as $144,000, nearly doubling his pension. On August 16, 2012, Illinois Governor Pat Quinn signed a bill which limited the state's liability when former state legislators bolster their state pensions with short-term jobs with cities, counties and other local governments.

=== Law clients with city business ===
In 2007, although one of eight alderman who were attorneys, only Burke disclosed law clients who were local government contractors. Burke had 37 law clients that did business with the city or other local government agencies, according to his annual ethics statement filed with the city. Burke disclosed 2008 income above the reporting threshold of $5,000 from each of 31 law clients that do business with the city.

Burke has been criticized for alleged conflicts of interest involving law clients and his role as chairman of the Council's Finance Committee. Burke has helped line up millions of dollars in public subsidies to companies that later hired his firm for property tax assessment appeals. Burke law clients which regularly have legislative issues before the Finance Committee have included communications company Ameritech, the Chicago Mercantile Exchange, Yellow Cab Company, and several major airlines and concessionaires at the city-owned O'Hare and Midway airports.

For example, Cotter and Company, a wholesaler to 6,000 True Value hardware stores, sought a package of public subsidies to keep their headquarters and operations in Chicago. In February 1996, while the final components of the package were working their way through City Hall, Burke toured Cotter's headquarters, at the end of which he handed out his business card from his private law practice and asked for the company's property tax appeals business. Cotter decided to hire Burke in March 1996 and finalized the arrangement in June 1996. An unprecedented $2.8 million cash grant from the City to Cotter, never publicized by the Daley administration, was included in a $20 million bond issue approved by the Finance Committee and the city council by July 31, 1996.

=== Recusals and corrections in voting record ===
Burke recuses himself from voting on issues involving clients so often that he was called "Chicago's most conflicted alderman" by the Chicago Sun-Times. Burke abstains from at least a few votes at almost every Finance Committee meeting.

In March 1997, weeks after hiring defense attorney Valukus, and days after learning from the Chicago Sun-Times of their investigation into Burke's law firm and clients, Burke invoked a rarely used motion to amend the proceedings of the city council to change to abstentions four "yes" votes regarding airport facility leases for Midway and American airlines, two of Burke's seven airline clients. Burke blamed the recording of his "aye" votes on the late Alderman Thomas Cullerton, who chaired the City Council Committee on Aviation, which reviews airport leases. Cullerton had died in February 1993, three months before Burke cast one of the votes he changed. At the July 2, 1997, City Council meeting, Burke changed to abstention a June 4, 1997, vote in favor of a property-tax break for another client, Heinemann's Inc., a baked goods company in Burke's 14th ward. Between 1993 and 1997, Burke put through six journal corrections on his votes, some dating back seven years, and accounting for more than half the corrections from all aldermen during that period. In 2004, Burke changed the record of a vote in support of a zoning change favorable to another of his clients, Centrum Properties.

Burke's corrections of his voting history were criticized by other aldermen and Chicago Mayor Richard M. Daley. Daley suggested Burke was involved in conflicts of interest that merited investigation by the Illinois Attorney Registration and Disciplinary Commission and the City Board of Ethics, and Daley advocated more stringent regulation regarding aldermanic conflicts of interest. Burke's conflicts of interest inspired a strengthening of the City's ethics laws in October 1998. The Council passed the ordinance, 40–9. Burke voted "no" in a voice vote, then switched to "yes" for the record.

=== Legislative initiatives ===
In October 1997, as Huels resigned in the SDI scandal, and amid calls for Burke's resignation, Burke sponsored a resolution exonerating Kate O'Leary and her cow Daisy of culpability for the Great Chicago Fire of 1871. The resolution cited research blaming the fire on an O'Leary neighbor, Daniel "Peg Leg" Sullivan. Burke argued in favor of passage of the resolution,

In 1871, journalists, eager to sensationalize the events of the Great Fire, were quick to find in Mrs. Kate O'Leary an easy scapegoat for the calamitous inferno. As a working-class immigrant and a woman, Kate O'Leary was an easy target for those publications who always found it comfortable to vilify Irish Catholics who had not yet assimilated into the dominant American middle-class culture.

The resolution was unanimously recommended by the city council's Police and Fire Committee on October 6, 1997, and passed unanimously by the full city council on October 28, 1997. Other Burke legislative initiatives include protecting non-smokers from second-hand smoke, mandating pet-spaying, and regulating fatty restaurant food.

=== Jerry Springer hearing ===
In April 1999, Roman Catholic priest and activist Michael Pfleger, pastor of St. Sabina parish in Chicago's Auburn Gresham neighborhood, wrote a letter to Chicago Police Superintendent Terry Hilliard complaining of the glorification of violence on The Jerry Springer Show, a popular television show which was produced in Chicago. Burke showed about ten minutes of clips from the show at the April 28, 1999, meeting of the city council's Police and Fire Committee and convinced aldermen to invite, under threat of subpoena, show host Jerry Springer to testify under oath as to whether the violence on the show was genuine or scripted. If scripted, Burke proposed to force the show to obtain a city entertainment license, and, if genuine, Burke proposed that the off-duty Chicago policemen providing security at the show arrest fighting guests on the set.

The hearing attracted more than 21 television news crews from around the country, including Court TV, MSNBC, Fox News, a film crew from The Jerry Springer Show, dozens of print reporters, and about 75 of Springer's fans. Burke led the questioning of Springer. None of the aldermen asked Springer if the violence was staged until more than an hour into the three-hour hearing. Springer, a former Cincinnati council member and mayor, spent most of his time sparring with Burke, and handled the inquiry.

=== Security detail ===
Burke was the only Chicago alderman who had Chicago police officers assigned to him as bodyguards. In 1986, Mayor Washington's acting Chicago police commissioner Fred Rice tried to reduce the number of Burke's bodyguards from four to two, on the basis that the manpower was no longer necessary. Burke sued the city, arguing that the move was a political retaliation. The court sided with Burke. Rice removed nearly all the aldermanic bodyguards, but was blocked by court orders from taking away the Vrdolyak and Burke contingents. For nine months in 2005, the police details assigned to the city clerk, city treasurer and Burke did not file any police reports. Andy Shaw, president and chief executive of the watchdog group Better Government Association, asked,

This is a city that doesn't have enough money for basic services right now and doesn't have enough money to protect regular citizens. The question has to be asked whether a full-time bodyguard detail to one alderman who hasn't been shown to be in any kind of danger for more than two decades is warranted.

An unmarked Chicago police car was assigned to Burke's city-funded security detail. He is one of several aldermen who lease sports utility vehicles at taxpayer expense.

=== Length of service ===
In November 2014, Burke surpassed John Coughlin as the longest-serving alderman in Chicago history. Coughlin, who had served from 1892 until his death in 1938, had held the record with 46 years.

=== Political prominence ===
According the Chicago Sun-Times in October 2023, Burke's political prominence did not come through mainly being a loyalist to the Chicago Mayor's office, but rather through the "army of allies" he placed in city jobs, and which served as his "personal intelligence network". It was noted that "Even mayors who despised Burke didn't dare to depose him as chairman of the council's Finance Committee, fearing the potential he had to stymie their legislative agendas."

=== Criminal charges ===
A criminal complaint was filed against Burke on January 2, 2019, for attempted extortion.

=== Conviction ===
On December 21, 2023, Burke was found guilty on 13 of 14 counts of racketeering, bribery, and extortion. Developer Charles Cui was also convicted, while Burke's aide Peter Andrews was acquitted. Burke turned 80 on December 29, 2023.

The Attorney Registration and Disciplinary Commission sought an interim suspension of Burke's license to practice law. The Illinois Supreme Court denied this motion because it was unable to obtain a quorum since a majority of the seven justices recused themselves from the matter.

=== Sentencing and imprisonment ===
On June 24, 2024, Burke was sentenced to two years in federal prison and given a $2 million fine. On June 8, 2025, after serving less than half his sentence, Burke was transferred from the Federal Correctional Institution, Thomson to community confinement, serving the remainder of his sentence at a halfway house. He would be released from home confinement on February 20, 2026.

== Attempts at other public office ==
In 1980, Burke sought the Democratic nomination for Cook County State's Attorney. Burke was aligned with Mayor Byrne and was endorsed by the Cook County Democratic Central Committee. Burke's loss in the primary to Richard M. Daley was interpreted at the time as a set-back for the Chicago political machine.

In 1988, following the sudden death in office of Mayor Harold Washington, Burke was one of several candidates who sought to fill the vacancy in the special election. "I know I would like to be Mayor. It is obviously the Super Bowl of Chicago politics," Burke said. After polls showed declining support for his candidacy, he dropped out of the race in December 1988 and endorsed Richard M. Daley, who won the nomination in the February 1989 Democratic primary.

== Property tax attorney ==
Burke was the lead partner in a Chicago law firm, Klafter and Burke, that specializes in representing clients in property tax appeals before the Cook County Assessor's Office, the Cook County Board of Review, and in the courts. The firm was successful in several "significant legal challenges" to Illinois real estate law. Burke's law firm's senior partner, Melvin Klafter, died on June 5, 1988, at age 73. The number of tax appeals Burke's firm filed for clients with the Board of Tax Appeals increased from 212 in 1982 to 1,876 in 1995. In 2002, Burke helped pass a city ordinance barring the city from contesting property tax appeals seeking a reduction in property assessment of under $1 million, which was most of Burke's cases. Between 2003 and 2013, Burke's firm won more than $18.1 million in property-tax refunds in Chicago.

In a 2006 interview, Burke reflected,

The law business is good. I have been fortunate to have the best of both worlds. I have enjoyed the political side of it and also enjoyed my private legal practice. Yes, there have been temptations, [but] if you try to conduct yourself under the rules, in the long run you are better off.

As of August 2019, Burke is no longer a partner with the law firm. According to the Illinois Secretary of State's office, he filed to withdraw himself as lead partner in April, a month before his federal indictment for bribery, racketeering, and extortion so he could increase more business for his former law firm. His daughter, Jennifer and two other attorneys took over his lead partnership.

== Personal life ==
Burke's wife Anne has served as an Illinois Appellate Court Justice and was installed as an Illinois Supreme Court Justice on July 4, 2006. The Burkes reside in the southwestern Chicago neighborhood of Archer Heights, close to Curie Metropolitan High School and the Pulaski Station of the CTA Orange Line. Their adult children are Jennifer, Edward, and Sarah. Jennifer is an attorney who worked in the City of Chicago Law Department under Mayor Richard M. Daley's corporation counsel and now is on the Illinois Pollution Control Board. Edward M. Burke Jr. was an assistant chief deputy to Cook County Sheriff Tom Dart. He resigned while under investigation for misconduct and was separately charged with domestic battery in 2019. In 2004, Burke's son Emmett, aged 30, was killed in a snowmobiling accident.

Burke's brother Daniel J. Burke was previously a member of the Illinois House of Representatives from Illinois' 23rd District, which includes the 14th ward, as well as a lobbyist to Chicago City Hall. Crain's Chicago Business in 2006 named Edward, Daniel, and Anne one of "Illinois' most influential families" and in 2013 named Edward and Anne one of Chicago's "15 clout-heavy clans".

Noted for his impeccable conservative suits and attention to accessorizing, Burke was named "Best Dressed Alderman" in a 1981 review of aldermen by the Chicago Tribune's City Hall reporters. Burke is also a licensed private detective in Illinois.

In April 2026, Burke offered to sell his Southwest Side home for $1.5 million.

=== Baby T ===
In February 1996, the Burkes became foster parents to an African American child, known in public by his court name "Baby T", born to a woman suffering drug addiction. The child's mother, Tina Olison, an addict in recovery, sued to regain custody of her child several times in a protracted, racially charged court battle that drew extensive media attention. In March 1999, Olison regained custody of the baby. In September 1999, however, the Burkes would regain custody of the baby. This ruling would be upheld in January 2000. The case ultimately reached the Illinois State Supreme Court, which again ruled in favor of custody for the Burkes in 2001.

== Publications ==
- Burke, Edward M.; O'Gorman, Thomas J. (2006). End of Watch: Chicago Police Killed in the Line of Duty 1853–2006. Chicago's Neighborhoods, Inc. ISBN 978-0-9788663-2-7.
- Sautter, R. Craig; Burke, Edward M. (1996). Inside the Wigwam: Chicago Presidential Conventions 1860–1996. Loyola Press. ISBN 978-0-8294-0911-6.
- Burke, Edward M. (March 22, 2002). "Lunatics and anarchists: political homicide in Chicago" (PDF). Journal of Criminal Law and Criminology. 92 (3–4). Northwestern University School of Law: 791–804. doi:10.2307/1144243. JSTOR 1144243.

== See also ==
- Political corruption in Illinois
- List of Chicago aldermen since 1923

Civic offices
Preceded by Joseph Burke	Member of the Chicago City Council from the 14th ward 1969–2023	Succeeded by Jeylú Gutiérrez
