= 1989 Chicago mayoral special election =

- April 4, 1989
- Turnout: 68.3% ▼5.78 pp
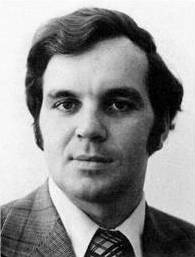

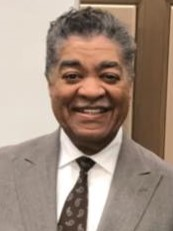

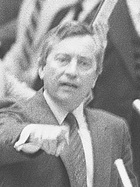
Nominee	Richard M. Daley	Timothy C. Evans	Ed Vrdolyak
Party	Democratic	Harold Washington	Republican
Popular vote	577,141	428,105	35,998
Percentage	55.43%	41.11%	3.46%
- Ward results
Mayor before election
Eugene Sawyer
Democratic
Elected Mayor
Richard M. Daley
Democratic

The Chicago mayoral election of 1989 saw Democratic nominee Richard M. Daley win election to the remainder of an unexpired mayoral term with a 14% margin of victory. This marked a return for the Daley family to the office of mayor. Daley was elected over Alderman Timothy Evans, the nominee of the newly formed Harold Washington Party, and the Republican nominee Ed Vrdolyak.

The election was held two years earlier than the next regularly scheduled mayoral election due to the death in office of Harold Washington. Eugene Sawyer had been appointed Mayor by the City Council to serve until the special election. He was defeated by Daley in the Democratic primary.

== Background ==
A lawsuit was filed by an anti-Sawyer coalition of black activists and several Harold Washington supporters demanding a special election be held as soon as possible.

On May 5, 1988, Eugene Wachowski, judge of the Cook County Circuit Court, held that a special election would be required to be held in 1989 on the basis of three previous rulings by Circuit, Appellate, and Supreme Court judges and by a 1978 legislative debate from when the Illinois General Assembly passed the then-current election law.

== Democratic primary ==
Richard M. Daley won the Democratic primary, defeating Eugene Sawyer, who had been appointed mayor by City Council following the death of Harold Washington. He also faced Sheila A. Jones and James C. Taylor (State Senator who had also been chief of staff in Jane Byrne's mayoral administration).

=== Candidates ===
- Richard M. Daley
- Sheila A. Jones, candidate for mayor of Chicago in 1987
- Eugene Sawyer, incumbent mayor
- James C. Taylor, state senator, former chief of staff to Chicago mayor Jane Byrne

Withdrew

- Edward M. Burke, alderman
- Lawrence S. Bloom, alderman

Denied ballot access

- Timothy C. Evans, alderman
- Juan Soliz

Declined to run

- Ed Kelly, former Chicago Park District superintendent

=== Campaign ===
While Daley was considered a poor public speaker, and sometimes a timid campaigner, he ran an effective campaign. In 1983, he was widely viewed merely as the son of the former mayor Richard J. Daley. In 1987, he had crafted an image of a strong public administrator. Daley's campaign was run by two young consultants that had previously worked on Paul Simon's 1984 United States Senate campaign, David Wilhelm and David Axelrod. His deputy campaign manager was Julie Hamos. His fundraising was headed by John Schmidt and Paul Stepan. Avis LaVelle served as his campaign press spokesperson.

One of Sawyer's first missteps was his choice for campaign leadership. Sawyer's campaign was managed by Louisiana political consultant Reynard Rochon. Rochon, being an outsider to Chicago politics, did not understand many important aspects of it. Additionally, Rochon spent much of his time working remotely from New Orleans. Sawyer did raise significant funds for his candidacy, but was also hampered by his personality — Sawyer was a low-key individual and eschewed interviews.

A media consultant was brought from Boston to film campaign commercials for Sawyer. Most of the ads were positive, highlighting the accomplishments of Sawyer's brief tenure. However, there were a few ads that attacked Daley by portraying him as stupid and unable to complete a sentence on his own. The campaign overspent on media advertising and failed to spend enough on literature, field operations, and lawn signs. Ultimately, Sawyer's campaign lacked a strong field operation.

The African-American anti-Sawyer faction, whose members were responsible for the lawsuit that led to the special election being ordered, rallied around Alderman Timothy C. Evans, whom they viewed as the proper heir to Washington's political legacy. Evans' allies criticized Sawyer; one of them, Dorothy Tillman, called the mayor an "Uncle Tom." Another alderman in Evans' camp was Bobby Rush. In July 1988, after receiving months of attacks from pro-Evans aldermen, Sawyer retaliated by stripping them of their committee chairmanships in a City Council restructuring.

African-American support was reported to be split between Sawyer and Evans. Sawyer attempted to broker a deal to get Evans to withdraw from the primary, but in a stroke of luck for Sawyer, Evans was ultimately removed from the ballot. Evans ultimately appeared on the November ballot as the candidate of the Harold Washington Party.

Daley, Sawyer, and Bloom participated in a debate. This was the last debate that Daley participated in as a candidate for mayor, as he did not participate in any debate during the general election or any of his subsequent re-election campaigns.

In December, Edward M. Burke withdrew from the race and endorsed Daley. Just under two weeks before the day of the primary, Alderman Lawrence S. Bloom withdrew his candidacy and endorsed Sawyer. Bloom had entered the race in September 1988 and had originally started his campaign near the front of the pack, benefiting from what the press referred to as a "squeaky clean" reputation.

During the campaign, Daley and Sawyer avoided lodging personal attacks, and both called for racial harmony.

=== Endorsements ===
Lawrence Bloom withdrew

Newspapers

- Chicago Lawyer
Richard M. Daley

Officeholders

- Edward M. Burke, Chicago alderman, formerly a candidate for mayor
- Luis Gutiérrez, Chicago alderman

Individuals

- Saul Bellow
Eugene Sawyer

Officeholders

- Lawrence S. Bloom, Chicago alderman, formerly a candidate for mayor

Individuals

- Jesse Jackson, reverend and civil rights leader, candidate for President of the United States in the 1984 Democratic primaries

=== Results ===
Results map of the Democratic primary by ward

Democratic primary results
Party	Candidate	Votes	%
Democratic	Richard M. Daley	485,182	55.63
Democratic	Eugene Sawyer (incumbent)	383,535	43.98
Democratic	James C. Taylor	2,233	0.26
Democratic	Sheila A. Jones	1,160	0.13
Total votes		872,110	100.00

Daley won a majority of the vote in 31 of the city's 50 wards, with Sawyer winning a majority of the vote in the remaining 19 wards.

==== Results by ward ====
Results by ward

Ward	Richard M. Daley		Eugene Sawyer		Lawrence S. Bloom		James C. Taylor		Sheila A. Jones		Total
Ward	Votes	%	Votes	%	Votes	%	Votes	%	Votes	%	Votes
1	8,321	50.8%	7,854	48.0%	118	0.7%	38	0.2%	38	0.2%	16,369
2	650	4.7%	12,903	93.8%	97	0.7%	56	0.4%	46	0.3%	13,752
3	408	3.1%	12,379	95.5%	59	0.5%	78	0.6%	37	0.3%	12,961
4	2,005	13.2%	12,938	84.9%	210	1.4%	61	0.4%	31	0.2%	15,245
5	2,341	13.0%	15,345	85.2%	235	1.3%	61	0.3%	22	0.1%	18,004
6	696	2.7%	24,460	95.8%	176	0.7%	131	0.5%	61	0.2%	25,524
7	2,389	18.1%	10,690	81.0%	75	0.6%	28	0.2%	23	0.2%	13,205
8	724	3.2%	21,508	95.6%	118	0.5%	103	0.5%	38	0.2%	22,491
9	1,075	6.7%	14,848	92.2%	59	0.4%	86	0.5%	35	0.2%	16,103
10	9,364	58.3%	6,586	41.0%	62	0.4%	23	0.1%	18	0.1%	16,053
11	18,496	88.4%	2,311	11.1%	70	0.3%	18	0.1%	18	0.1%	20,913
12	15,843	88.6%	1,956	10.9%	52	0.3%	20	0.1%	14	0.1%	17,885
13	29,801	96.6%	932	3.0%	98	0.3%	15	0.0%	6	0.0%	30,852
14	15,444	86.8%	2,269	12.8%	58	0.3%	17	0.1%	8	0.0%	17,796
15	3,844	24.4%	11,691	74.3%	85	0.5%	82	0.5%	42	0.3%	15,744
16	413	2.9%	13,251	93.7%	57	0.4%	379	2.7%	37	0.3%	14,137
17	466	2.7%	16,881	96.3%	68	0.4%	77	0.4%	43	0.2%	17,535
18	14,456	55.6%	11,330	43.6%	99	0.4%	65	0.3%	29	0.1%	25,979
19	23,993	82.6%	4,895	16.9%	112	0.4%	22	0.1%	18	0.1%	29,040
20	457	3.2%	13,709	95.5%	71	0.5%	63	0.4%	48	0.3%	14,348
21	598	2.7%	21,700	96.2%	96	0.4%	108	0.5%	46	0.2%	22,548
22	3,532	67.9%	1,631	31.4%	19	0.4%	11	0.2%	6	0.1%	5,199
23	27,815	97.1%	739	2.6%	79	0.3%	5	0.0%	5	0.0%	28,643
24	426	2.7%	14,897	95.9%	78	0.5%	92	0.6%	35	0.2%	15,528
25	4,561	64.3%	2,481	35.0%	32	0.5%	14	0.2%	10	0.1%	7,098
26	6,976	72.0%	2,609	26.9%	71	0.7%	13	0.1%	23	0.2%	9,692
27	1,653	15.2%	9,078	83.5%	55	0.5%	59	0.5%	23	0.2%	10,868
28	328	2.7%	11,902	96.4%	47	0.4%	50	0.4%	23	0.2%	12,350
29	1,050	7.6%	12,621	91.5%	37	0.3%	53	0.4%	27	0.2%	13,788
30	13,099	81.1%	2,971	18.4%	57	0.4%	16	0.1%	16	0.1%	16,159
31	6,103	64.4%	3,317	35.0%	40	0.4%	13	0.1%	10	0.1%	9,483
32	10,650	81.3%	2,305	17.6%	105	0.8%	16	0.1%	21	0.2%	13,097
33	13,425	86.2%	1,995	12.8%	127	0.8%	11	0.1%	19	0.1%	15,577
34	520	2.6%	19,225	96.3%	89	0.4%	85	0.4%	35	0.2%	19,954
35	14,348	91.1%	1,310	8.3%	75	0.5%	10	0.1%	6	0.0%	15,749
36	23,193	92.6%	1,724	6.9%	103	0.4%	6	0.0%	12	0.0%	25,038
37	783	5.8%	12,696	93.3%	37	0.3%	69	0.5%	30	0.2%	13,615
38	23,980	95.1%	1,146	4.5%	72	0.3%	3	0.0%	6	0.0%	25,207
39	16,659	90.2%	1,680	9.1%	102	0.6%	12	0.1%	10	0.1%	18,463
40	12,715	87.7%	1,678	11.6%	89	0.6%	11	0.1%	11	0.1%	14,504
41	25,990	93.2%	1,780	6.4%	108	0.4%	2	0.0%	9	0.0%	27,889
42	12,136	64.9%	6,354	34.0%	156	0.8%	31	0.2%	25	0.1%	18,702
43	17,050	80.6%	3,909	18.5%	161	0.8%	16	0.1%	13	0.1%	21,149
44	13,960	75.4%	4,253	23.0%	262	1.4%	11	0.1%	19	0.1%	18,505
45	24,541	94.0%	1,432	5.5%	112	0.4%	10	0.0%	10	0.0%	26,105
46	9,200	64.3%	4,924	34.4%	142	1.0%	19	0.1%	25	0.2%	14,310
47	14,841	85.3%	2,404	13.8%	123	0.7%	7	0.0%	22	0.1%	17,397
48	9,094	63.9%	4,915	34.5%	171	1.2%	23	0.2%	23	0.2%	14,226
49	8,428	62.2%	4,894	36.1%	193	1.4%	24	0.2%	18	0.1%	13,557
50	16,342	87.1%	2,229	11.9%	168	0.9%	10	0.1%	10	0.1%	18,759
Total	485,182	55.3%	383,535	43.7%	4,985	0.6%	2,233	0.3%	1,160	0.1%	877,095

Voter turnout was 200,000 less in the primary than it had been in the regularly scheduled mayoral primary two years prior. The decrease was even more pronounced in black neighborhoods than it had been in white neighborhoods.

According to a New York Times—WBBM-TV poll found that Daley received 91% of the white vote, to Sawyers 8%. It found, in contrast, that Sawyer received 94% of the black vote, to Daley's 5%. The poll also found that Jewish and Hispanic voters, who Sawyer had hoped to capture the support of, had strongly went for Daley. It found that Daley got 83% of the Jewish vote, to Sawyer's 15%. It also found that Daley got 84% of the Hispanic vote, to Sawyer's 15%. Additionally, the poll found that three-fourths of whites that had previously voted for Harold Washington voted for Daley.

== Republican primary ==
=== Candidates ===
- William J. Grutzmacher.
- Kenneth R. Hurst
- Herbert Sohn, urologist

Write-in candidates

- Edward Vrdolyak, alderman, former chairman of the Cook County Democratic Party, 1987 Illinois Solidarity Party nominee for mayor

Withdrew

- John Holowinski
- Bernard Stone, Chicago alderman

Denied ballot access

- Alfred Walter Balciunas,
- Edward L. Bowe
- Arthur J. Jones, neo-Nazi
- Gene Kulichenko
- Dean Rosenburg
- Jon Silverstein

Declined to run

- Ed Kelly, former Chicago Park District superintendent

=== Campaign ===
Less than two weeks before the day of the primary election, a movement emerged to draft 1987 Illinois Solidarity Party nominee Edward Vrdolyak as a write-in candidate for the Republican primary. Vrdolyak obliged, launching a last-minute a write-in campaign for the nomination only a week before the late February primary.

He defeated the GOP-backed Sohn by more than a thousand votes, which put him out of reach of the 5% spread for a recount to be triggered. Nearly 5000 of Vdrolyak's votes, representing close to half of his total, came from the 10th Ward he represented.

An additional candidate seeking the nomination, John Holowinski, had withdrawn from the race in late January.

=== Results ===
Republican primary results
Party	Candidate	Votes	%
write-in	Edward Vrdolyak	11,621	46.81
Republican	Herbert Sohn	10,478 (Note: ChicagoDemocracy.org reports Sohn getting 10,503 votes, while UPI reports the 10,478 figure)	42.22
Republican	Kenneth R. Hurst	1,581	6.369
Republican	William J. Grutzmacher	1,142	4.6
Total votes		24,821 (Note: This number assumes Sohn received 10,478 votes. The total is 24,846 if Sohn received 10,503 votes.)	100.00

== Harold Washington Party nomination ==
Timothy C. Evans, who had been unable to run for the Democratic nomination due to issues regarding his petition, received the Harold Washington Party's nomination.

== Other candidates ==
Independent candidate Peter Davis Kauss saw his name excluded from the ballot due to issues with his petition.

== General election ==
=== Results ===
Daley won the election by a fourteen-point margin.

Daley became the fifth (and, currently, the most recent) mayor to come from the city's Bridgeport neighborhood (after Edward J. Kelly, Martin H. Kennelly, Richard J. Daley, and Michael Bilandic).

Mayor of Chicago 1989 special election (general election)
Party	Candidate	Votes	%
Democratic	Richard M. Daley	577,141	55.43
Harold Washington	Timothy C. Evans	428,105	41.11
Republican	Edward Vrdolyak	35,998	3.46
Turnout		1,041,244	

Daley carried a majority of the vote in 31 of the city's 50 wards, with Evans carrying a majority of the vote in the remaining 19 wards.

Vroldyak only saw double-digit percentage of the votes in the 10th ward, which he had previously represented as an alderman. Elsewhere he saw only single-digit percentage of the vote.

==== Results by ward ====
Results by ward

Ward	Richard M. Daley (Democratic Party)		Timothy C. Evans (Harold Washington Party)		Edward R. Vrdolyak (Republican Party)		Total
Ward	Votes	%	Votes	%	Votes	%	Votes
1	10,651	54.6%	8,233	42.2%	617	3.2%	19,501
2	1,405	8.6%	14,710	89.7%	276	1.7%	16,391
3	833	5.2%	15,165	94.0%	137	0.8%	16,135
4	2,685	14.6%	15,459	83.8%	295	1.6%	18,439
5	3,212	15.5%	17,096	82.7%	362	1.8%	20,670
6	1,634	5.8%	26,425	93.0%	343	1.2%	28,402
7	3,249	19.9%	12,626	77.3%	455	2.8%	16,330
8	1,410	5.4%	24,324	93.5%	269	1.0%	26,003
9	1,573	8.0%	17,927	91.0%	202	1.0%	19,702
10	11,580	46.6%	6,987	28.1%	6,289	25.3%	24,856
11	20,101	88.1%	2,372	10.4%	351	1.5%	22,824
12	17,976	86.8%	1,829	8.8%	903	4.4%	20,708
13	32,976	95.9%	206	0.6%	1,187	3.5%	34,369
14	17,363	85.0%	2,369	11.6%	705	3.4%	20,437
15	4,595	22.9%	15,259	75.9%	250	1.2%	20,104
16	894	5.0%	16,690	94.2%	125	0.7%	17,709
17	851	4.0%	20,338	95.3%	159	0.7%	21,348
18	15,910	53.2%	13,211	44.2%	772	2.6%	29,893
19	26,527	81.2%	4,871	14.9%	1,276	3.9%	32,674
20	1,170	6.7%	15,991	92.3%	173	1.0%	17,334
21	1,079	4.0%	25,927	95.5%	149	0.5%	27,155
22	4,849	71.5%	1,728	25.5%	209	3.1%	6,786
23	30,431	95.2%	163	0.5%	1,356	4.2%	31,950
24	793	4.4%	17,062	94.8%	149	0.8%	18,004
25	6,453	75.8%	1,774	20.8%	289	3.4%	8,516
26	8,887	72.0%	3,135	25.4%	325	2.6%	12,347
27	2,535	18.4%	11,021	80.2%	187	1.4%	13,743
28	634	4.0%	15,000	95.2%	123	0.8%	15,757
29	1,563	9.0%	15,587	89.9%	179	1.0%	17,329
30	15,593	80.0%	3,203	16.4%	702	3.6%	19,498
31	7,853	63.3%	4,270	34.4%	280	2.3%	12,403
32	12,670	82.8%	2,103	13.7%	523	3.4%	15,296
33	16,209	88.1%	1,587	8.6%	605	3.3%	18,401
34	1,019	4.3%	22,674	95.1%	161	0.7%	23,854
35	16,945	91.5%	611	3.3%	961	5.2%	18,517
36	26,566	92.3%	1,030	3.6%	1,179	4.1%	28,775
37	1,245	7.1%	16,239	92.2%	123	0.7%	17,607
38	27,372	94.5%	278	1.0%	1,316	4.5%	28,966
39	19,793	91.9%	766	3.6%	969	4.5%	21,528
40	15,530	89.1%	1,064	6.1%	835	4.8%	17,429
41	29,795	92.5%	367	1.1%	2,054	6.4%	32,216
42	15,454	70.8%	5,338	24.5%	1,028	4.7%	21,820
43	21,026	85.4%	2,570	10.4%	1,027	4.2%	24,623
44	16,990	80.9%	3,203	15.3%	805	3.8%	20,998
45	27,727	93.8%	332	1.1%	1,490	5.0%	29,549
46	11,546	66.1%	5,250	30.1%	665	3.8%	17,461
47	17,340	87.4%	1,627	8.2%	871	4.4%	19,838
48	11,504	66.0%	5,119	29.4%	814	4.7%	17,437
49	10,560	64.3%	5,218	31.8%	655	4.0%	16,433
50	20,064	89.3%	1,620	7.2%	789	3.5%	22,473
Total	576,620	55.4%	427,954	41.1%	35,964	3.5%	1,040,538
