= Cook County Public Defender =

The Cook County Public Defender provides legal representation for indigent clients in the areas of felony and misdemeanor criminal cases, delinquency, abuse/neglect, some appeals, post-conviction, and traffic (non-petty) cases when appointed by the Court throughout Cook County, Illinois, which includes Chicago. Currently, the Cook County Public Defender is Sharone R. Mitchell, Jr. It is the second largest state public defender office in the United States after the Los Angeles County Public Defender.

== Divisions ==
- Capital Case Coordinator
- Child Protection
- Felony Trial
- Forensic Science
- Homicide Task Force
- Investigations
- Juvenile Justice
- Legal Resources (formerly Appeals and Post Conviction)
- Multiple Defendant Division
- Professional Development
