= Timothy C. Evans =

American politician (born 1943)

Tim Evans
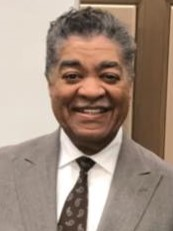
- Evans, circa 2017

Judge of the Illinois First District Appellate Court
- Assuming office August 16, 2026
- Succeeding: Terrence J. Lavin

Chief Judge of the Cook County Circuit Court
- In office September 2001 – December 1, 2025
- Preceded by: Donald O'Connell
- Succeeded by: Charles Beach

Judge of the Cook County Circuit Court from the 5th subcircuit
- In office December 1992 – August 2026

Member of the Chicago City Council from the 4th ward
- In office November 27, 1973 – May 1991
- Preceded by: Claude Holman
- Succeeded by: Toni Preckwinkle

Personal details
- Born: June 1, 1943 (age 83) Hot Springs, Arkansas, U.S.
- Party: Democratic
- Other political affiliations: Harold Washington Party (1989)
- Spouse: Thelma Evans (m. 1969)
- Children: 2
- Education: Illinois State University; University of Illinois, Urbana-Champaign (BS); John Marshall Law School (JD)

Timothy C. Evans (born June 1, 1943) is an American attorney, politician, former alderman and the former Chief Judge of the Cook County Circuit Court. Evans is noted as the first African-American Chief Judge of the Cook County Circuit Court. A graduate of the John Marshall Law School in Chicago, Evans was first elected to the bench in 1992, and was selected by his fellow judges as Chief Judge in 2001.

== Early life and education ==
Born the middle of three children in Hot Springs, Arkansas to George and Tiny Marie Evans, his family relocated to Chicago during the great migration. Having attended elementary school in Arkansas, Evans attended and graduated from Hirsch Metropolitan High School in 1961. After high school, Evans went on to study at Illinois State University, and later transferred to University of Illinois at Urbana-Champaign where he graduated with a B.S. in zoology/ Evans earned his J.D. degree at John Marshall Law School in 1969 and joined the Democratic Party.

== Chicago City Council (1973–1991) ==
=== First, second, and third terms (1973–1983) ===
Evans was elected alderman of the city's south side 4th Ward in a November 27, 1973 special election to fill the vacancy created six months earlier by the death of Ald. Claude Holman on June 1, 1973. Evans defeated Hattie B. Kay Williams, a 50-year-old executive of the Girl Scouts and civil rights activist by a vote of 6,784 to 3,136. Evans was re-elected to a second term in 1975 and a third term in 1979.

During his first term and second, Evans was an ally to mayor Richard J. Daley. After Daley's late-1976 death, he was succeeded by Michael A. Bilandic, who Evans was also an ally to. Evans was also an ally to Mayor Jane Byrne, who was mayor during his third aldermanic term.

=== Fourth and fifth terms (1983–1989) ===
Evans was re-elected to fourth and fifth terms as alderman in 1983 and 1987.

In these terms, amid the Council Wars, Evans was an ally to Mayor Harold Washington (elected mayor in 1983 and 1987. Evans served as council floor leader and finance chair during Washington's mayoralty.

Following Washington's death in November 1987, Evans sought appointment to Washington's unexpired term. The Chicago City Council voted instead to choose to appoint Eugene Sawyer as mayor. Evans continued to serve as alderman.

=== Harold Washington Party and mayoral campaign ===
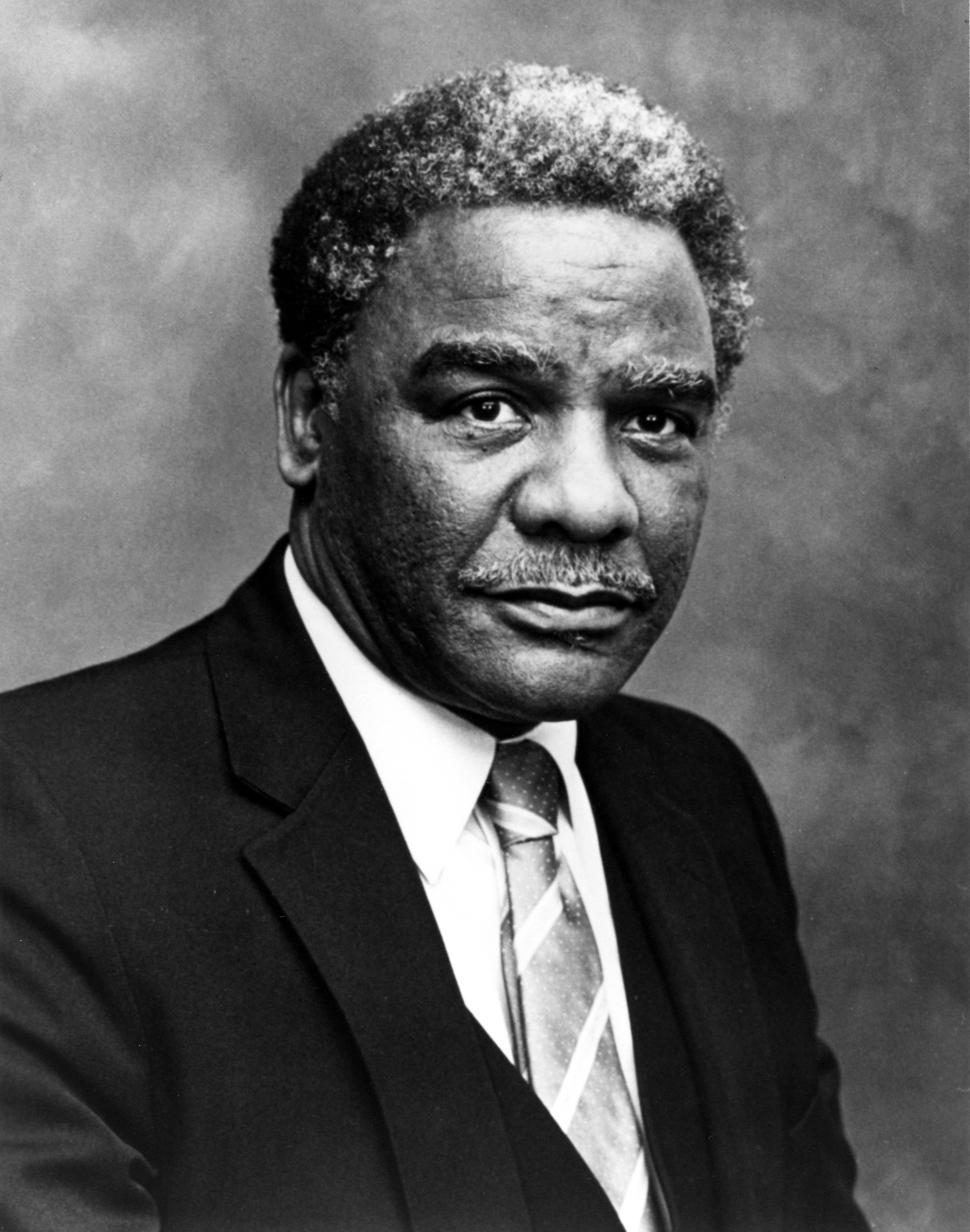
Harold Washington, the namesake for the party

Line graph of the vote share of the party's candidates in Chicago mayoral elections

The Harold Washington Party was founded in Chicago in the late 1980s by Evans to represent the interests of the city's African-American population who felt disenchanted with the mainline Democratic Party. In the 1989 special election, Evans ran as an independent candidate to fill the rest of Washington's term as mayor. Evans received 482,000 votes but lost to Richard M. Daley, son of former multi-term mayor Richard J. Daley. The party also nominated candidates for several other offices in Cook County.

In 1990, ahead of the Cook County elections, a court decision denied Harold Washington Party nominees ballot access, which was reported a boon to the Democratic Party slate. Ballot access was later reinstated though it required a jury-rigged solution to vote for their candidates because of how close to the election the decision was reached.

Additionally, R. Eugene Pincham left the Democratic Party and joined the Harold Washington Party after losing the Democratic nomination for President of the Cook County Board of Commissioners. The party did not do as well as they did during the 1989 special election but candidates for major offices such as County Clerk or Sheriff got around 8-16% of the vote, and the party received 10% of the total vote for Cook County Commissioner seats, which did not gain them any seats.

James R. Hutchinson, the party's vice-chairman, was going to be the party's candidate for the 1991 Chicago mayoral election, if Danny K. Davis secured the Democratic nomination; this did not happen and so Hutchinson stepped down so Pincham could be the party's mayoral candidate. Pincham received the endorsement of Davis shortly afterwards. The party wanted to expand their appeal and added white candidates such as Larry Machaj, a Polish-American businessman, to their slate. Despite the change in candidates, Richard M. Daley won in a landslide against Pincham with him under-performing expectations. Daley increased his average vote share in predominately African American wards from nine to fifteen percent from the primary to the general election. Overall, Daley received 25% of the African American vote, including over 40% in two predominately African American wards.

The following few years were chaotic for the party. In 1992, a dispute over a deal between the party and the Hudepohl-Schoenling Brewing Co., makers of Mt. Everest malt liquor, displeased half of the party. The brewery would donate 25 cents per case sold in African American neighborhoods in Chicago towards community projects. Joseph Faulkner, the party's Chicago's 8th Ward committeeman, criticized the move as a deal that will increase malt liquor sales in the community for the financial gain of party officials. Reed, the leader of the party, stating this was a way to reinvest part of the millions spent on malt liquor in the community. During the 1992 County elections the party fielded only a single candidate: Doloris Jones for Clerk of the Circuit Court, who finished in a distant third place with 6.97% of the vote. Shortly afterwards, Pincham left the party over a Republican-backed loan taken for the party. Hutchinson denied any ties to the Republican Party. At the end of 1993 the party suffered a schism between the Progressive Independents of the Harold Washington Party, headed by Bruce Crosby, and the Harold Washington Party, headed by David Reed. The former viewed Reed's decision to endorse non-party candidates as treasonous.

Up until the 1994 County elections, the Harold Washington Party never had primaries to decide on candidates, but since Crosby and Reed both ran for the Harold Washington Party nomination for President of the Cook County Board of Commissioners there needed to be one. Infighting occurred within the party during the election cycle with Baker, a member of the Progressive Independents of the Harold Washington Party, calling fellow party member Tyler a Republican in disguise. The party fielded more candidates than the previous election this cycle, but they were still a distant third place in each election they participated in.

From this point on the Harold Washington Party would gain few votes. The party's candidate, Lawrence C. Redmond, had less than one percent of the vote in the 1995 Chicago mayoral election, and the 1996 County elections were the final elections for which the party fielded a candidate.

=== 1991 defeat ===
After 18 years in office, in 1991 Evans was defeated for re-election as alderman in the 4th Ward by Toni Preckwinkle.

== Cook County Circuit Judge (1992-2026) ==
In 1992, Evans was elected to the bench as judge of Cook County Circuit Court.

=== Chief Judge (2001–2025) ===
In September 2001, Evans was elected as the chief judge of the Cook County Circuit Court succeeding Donald O'Connell. Evans was the first Black person to hold this office.

For twenty-four years, Timothy C. Evans reigned quietly yet firmly over the courts of Cook County. First chosen by his peers in 2001, and re-elected on schedule ever since, Evans became the longest-serving Chief Judge in the county’s modern history. Under his steady hand, courts saw the establishment of a supportive infrastructure: specialized divisions for domestic violence and elder law, a newly created courthouse for battered survivors, reforms in pretrial fairness and electronic monitoring, efforts toward greater access and reform. But in September 2025, the judges of Cook County broke with cadence. Amid the dull but durable rhythm of uncontested or lightly contested reelections that had marked Evans’s tenure, two challengers—Judges Charles Beach and Nichole C. Patton—stepped forward. It was rare, during Evans’s reign, to see genuine opposition. On September 10, 2025, the court convened in the Richard J. Daley Center for their triennial secret ballot. After two rounds, Judge Charles Beach emerged victorious, defeating Evans by a tally of 144 to 109, with one spoiled ballot; Patton, who had been a second challenger, withdrew after the first round and threw her support behind Beach. Judge Beach’s term will begin December 1, 2025, for three years, thereby ending Evans’s unbroken stretch of eight terms in office. The Chief Judge oversees judicial assignments, manages a budget ($368 million, as of 2025), and manages more than 3,000 full-time employees (as of 2025, the third-largest workforce of any Cook County agency).

During his tenure, the court reformed its pretrail system. It also implemented an end to cash bail, per the state's SAFE-T Act. During his tenure, the Chief Judge's office also assumed full responsibility for managing the county's electronic monitoring system.

The Chief Judge of Cook County is chosen by a vote of fellow judges. Terms are three years in length His first election in September 2001 was unanimous. Evans was elected to eight consecutive terms, and in September 2025 sought a ninth. The 2025 vote saw Evans face two challengers, a rarity during Evans's years as Chief Judge. He was defeated, with Charles Beach being elected in 144 to 109. Beach replaced Evans as Chief Judge on December 1, 2025.

Evans oversaw the opening of the first Restorative Justice Community Courts in Illinois.

In his final term as chief justice, he oversaw the court system's operations through challenges imposed by the health precautions related to the COVID-19 pandemic.

==== Employment lawsuits ====
During Chief Judge Timothy C. Evans’s tenure, the Office of the Chief Judge and its probation departments were the subject of several lawsuits alleging discrimination and unfair treatment of employees.

In Jordan et al. v. Chief Judge of the Circuit Court of Cook County, a group of African-American juvenile probation officers, including Anthony Jordan, Theodis Chapman, Patrick Nelson, and Kenneth Greenlaw, alleged that they were subjected to racial discrimination and retaliation in disciplinary actions, transfers, and work assignments. They alleged that under his administration they had been subjected to discriminatory discipline, unfair transfers, and retaliation.

The lawsuit accused the Juvenile Probation Department of:

- terminating or demoting individuals in a pattern that disadvantaged Black officers,
- assigning transfers out of desirable programs (notably the “Jumpstart” program) in retaliation for discrimination complaints,
- differential treatment in pay and training opportunities, and other adverse actions.

After motions for summary judgment (Evans defending in his official capacity), some claims were dismissed, others survived. For example, the court found that certain claims (like those of Nelson and Chapman regarding their transfers) had sufficient factual disputes to proceed.

While portions of the case were dismissed on summary judgment, some claims proceeded to trial. On appeal, the Seventh Circuit ultimately affirmed judgment for the Office of the Chief Judge, finding insufficient evidence to prove unlawful discrimination or retaliation.【law.justia.com†L1-L10】

In a lawsuit filed by Kimberly Flanagan:

- Plaintiff Kimberly Flanagan, an African-American probation officer working in the Cook County Adult Probation Department (which operates under the Office of the Chief Judge), filed a lawsuit alleging discrimination and retaliation under Title VII and 42 U.S.C. § 1981.
- In the initial complaint (filed August 2002), Flanagan alleged that she was denied promotions and assignments (including to a weapons-carrying unit) because of her race and sex.
- She also alleged that, after the discrimination claims, she suffered retaliation: heightened scrutiny, harassment, disciplinary actions, removal of office privileges, forced additional training at her own expense, audits of her time records, and other adverse actions.
- Flanagan won on her retaliation claim at trial in early 2007, with an award of about $205,000, later reduced (remitted) to $75,000, which she accepted. The discrimination claims (race and sex) were not successful (sex discrimination claims were dismissed by the jury; race discrimination claims dismissed earlier).

In 2023, Cook County approved a settlement of approximately $139,034.96 in the case of Loizon v. Evans et al. The case, filed against the Office of the Chief Judge, alleged employment discrimination. The settlement was authorized by the Cook County Board of Commissioners following litigation in both federal and state court (Case Nos. 18 C 2759; 22 CC 2801).【cook-county.legistar.com†L1-L9】 In Miller v. Office of the Chief Judge (Case No. 19 C 4216), Helen Miller brought an employment discrimination lawsuit against the office. In 2022, the Cook County Board approved a settlement totaling $1,268,247.20, including $768,247.20 to Miller and additional payments to her attorneys. The case represented one of the largest discrimination-related settlements involving the Chief Judge’s office.【cook-county.legistar.com†L1-L9】

== Illinois Appellate Court ==
On August 6, 2026, the Supreme Court of Illinois announced that Evans would be appointed as a judge of the Illinois First District Appellate Court effective August 17, 2026. He will fill the vacancy left by the retirement of Justice Terrence J. Lavin on March 31 of that same year. Evans's appointment will extend to December 4, 2028.

== Personal life ==
Evans met his wife during his time at University of Illinois at Urbana-Champaign.

== Awards and recognition ==
- "William H. Rehnquist Award for Judicial Excellence" from the National Center for State Courts (2009)
- named "Person of the Year" by the magazine Chicago Lawyer in 2017
- inducted into the Arkansas Black Hall of Fame in 2010
