= Eugene Sawyer =

American businessman and politician

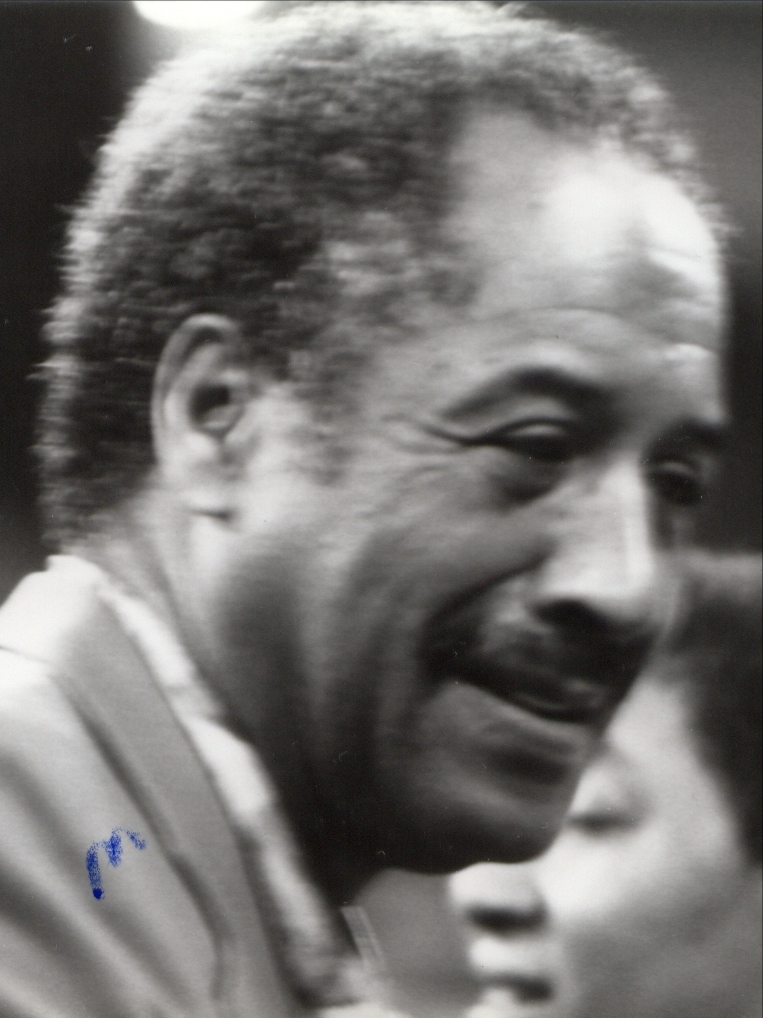
- Sawyer in 1994

53rd Mayor of Chicago
- In office December 2, 1987 – April 24, 1989
- Deputy: David Orr; Terry Gabinski
- Preceded by: Harold Washington; David Orr (acting)
- Succeeded by: Richard M. Daley

Member of the Chicago City Council from the 6th ward
- In office February 28, 1971 – December 2, 1987
- Preceded by: A. A. Rayner Jr.
- Succeeded by: Ronald Robinson

Personal details
- Born: September 3, 1934 Greensboro, Alabama, U.S.
- Died: January 19, 2008 (aged 73) Chicago, Illinois, U.S.
- Resting place: Oak Woods Cemetery
- Party: Democratic
- Spouses: Eleanor Taylor (m. 1955; div. 1984) Veronica L. Smith (m. 1996)
- Children: 3, including Roderick
- Education: Alabama State University

Eugene Sawyer Jr. (September 3, 1934 – January 19, 2008) was an American businessman, educator, and politician. Sawyer was selected by the Chicago City Council as the 53rd Mayor of Chicago, Illinois after the sudden death of then–mayor Harold Washington. Sawyer served for the remainder of the term, from December 2, 1987 until April 24, 1989. A member of the Democratic Party, Sawyer was an alderman, and the second African-American to serve as mayor of Chicago.

== Early life and career ==
Born to Bernice and Eugene Sawyer Sr. in Greensboro, Alabama, the oldest of six children, Sawyer spent summer vacations in Chicago with his aunt during his childhood. Sawyer attended Alabama State University, where he joined the Alpha Phi Alpha fraternity. He graduated from Alabama State in 1956 with bachelor's degree in chemistry. He had a brief stint as a chemistry and mathematics teacher in Prentiss, Mississippi, before moving to Chicago to do laboratory work in 1957. Shortly after moving to Chicago, Sawyer took a job in Chicago’s Department of Water, where he worked from 1959 until 1971. While working for the city's water department, Sawyer became involved with the Sixth Ward Regular Democratic organization and the Young Democrats (YD) through family friends, becoming the organization president and financial secretary in October 1968.

== Chicago Alderman (1971–1987) ==
In February 1971, Sawyer was elected Alderman of Chicago's 6th ward. By 1987, he was the longest-serving black alderman on the Chicago City Council. The sudden death of Mayor Harold Washington created a vacancy at city hall. With David Duvall Orr serving as interim mayor, the city council met to select a permanent successor as mayor. Washington's supporters in the city council split, with some supporting Alderman Sawyer, but most voting for Timothy C. Evans. The City Council elected Sawyer mayor in a tumultuous and lengthy meeting. Having received the majority of votes from the council’s white aldermen, Sawyer faced accusations of "selling out" to the white community, which led to protests from Evans’ supporters.

== Mayor of Chicago (1987–1989) ==
It is an urban legend that Sawyer's inauguration as mayor occurred in the parking lot of a closed restaurant at North and Bosworth Avenues at 4:01 am on December 2, 1987, in an effort to avoid public demonstration. In fact, he was sworn in at the Chicago City Council chambers. He was soft-spoken, which led to local media to refer to him as "Mr. Mumbles", or "Mayor Mumbles".

Sawyer enacted Washington's budget for the 1988 fiscal year. In January 1988, Sawyer was able to get the council to approve legislation that broke the taxi monopoly in the city, something which Washington had been unable to do.

Despite the division surrounding his selection, Sawyer pushed several initiatives through the city council, including the installation of lights at Wrigley Field and the Clean Indoor Air Ordinance, which banned indoor smoking. Building on groundwork laid under Mayor Washington, Sawyer championed the Human Rights Ordinance, passed in 1988, to protect individuals against discrimination. This was the first Chicago city ordinance to assert the rights of gay and lesbian Chicagoans.

Sawyer helped spur private development of land surrounding O'Hare International Airport.

Sawyer reached an unprecedented four-year agreement with the firemen's union.

In 1989, Sawyer ran for election in his own right. In the Democratic primary election, Richard M. Daley, the son of the late mayor Richard J. Daley, defeated Sawyer, taking 57% of the vote to Sawyer’s 40%.

=== Approval ratings ===
Sawyer was less popular a mayor than his predecessor, Washington, but still enjoyed a respectable approval rating. Nevertheless, polling showed that Chicagoans had doubt in Sawyer's leadership capabilities: a 1988 Chicago Tribune poll showed that 55% of residents did not think of Sawyer as being "strong, decisive, and independent", and 54% did not think he was an "effective leader".

== Retirement and death ==
After losing the mayoral contest, Sawyer lost his reelection bid for Democratic committeeman of the 6th Ward and subsequently retired from politics. After retiring from politics, he became involved in business again. Sawyer was also an active member of the Vernon Park Church of God in Chicago's Pill Hill neighborhood. Sawyer was thanked in the 1989 movie Uncle Buck, which was filmed during the final months of his administration.

In 1998, Sawyer suffered a stroke.

Sawyer died at age 73 on Saturday, January 19, 2008, at approximately 11 PM after a series of strokes and other health setbacks over the previous month. Public viewing for Sawyer took place on January 25 and his funeral took place on January 26 followed by burial at Oak Woods Cemetery, where Harold Washington is buried. Sawyer's mayoral papers are available as the Eugene Sawyer Collection at Special Collections department of the Chicago Public Library located in the Harold Washington Library.

== Personal life ==
Sawyer was married to Veronica Smith-Sawyer from September 7, 1996 until his death. From 1955 until 1984, Sawyer was married to Eleanor Taylor. Together, they had three children; sons, Roderick and Shedrick, and a daughter, Sheryl Sawyer McGill. Roderick followed his father into politics. In 2011, Roderick Sawyer was elected as 6th ward alderman, the same post which his father had held.

== See also ==
- Steve Cokely
- Monroe Anderson, journalist, author, was Chicago's press secretary for mayor Eugene Sawyer

Political offices
Preceded by David Orr	Mayor of Chicago; December 2, 1987 – April 24, 1989	Succeeded by Richard M. Daley
