= Jim Edgar =

American politician (1946–2025)

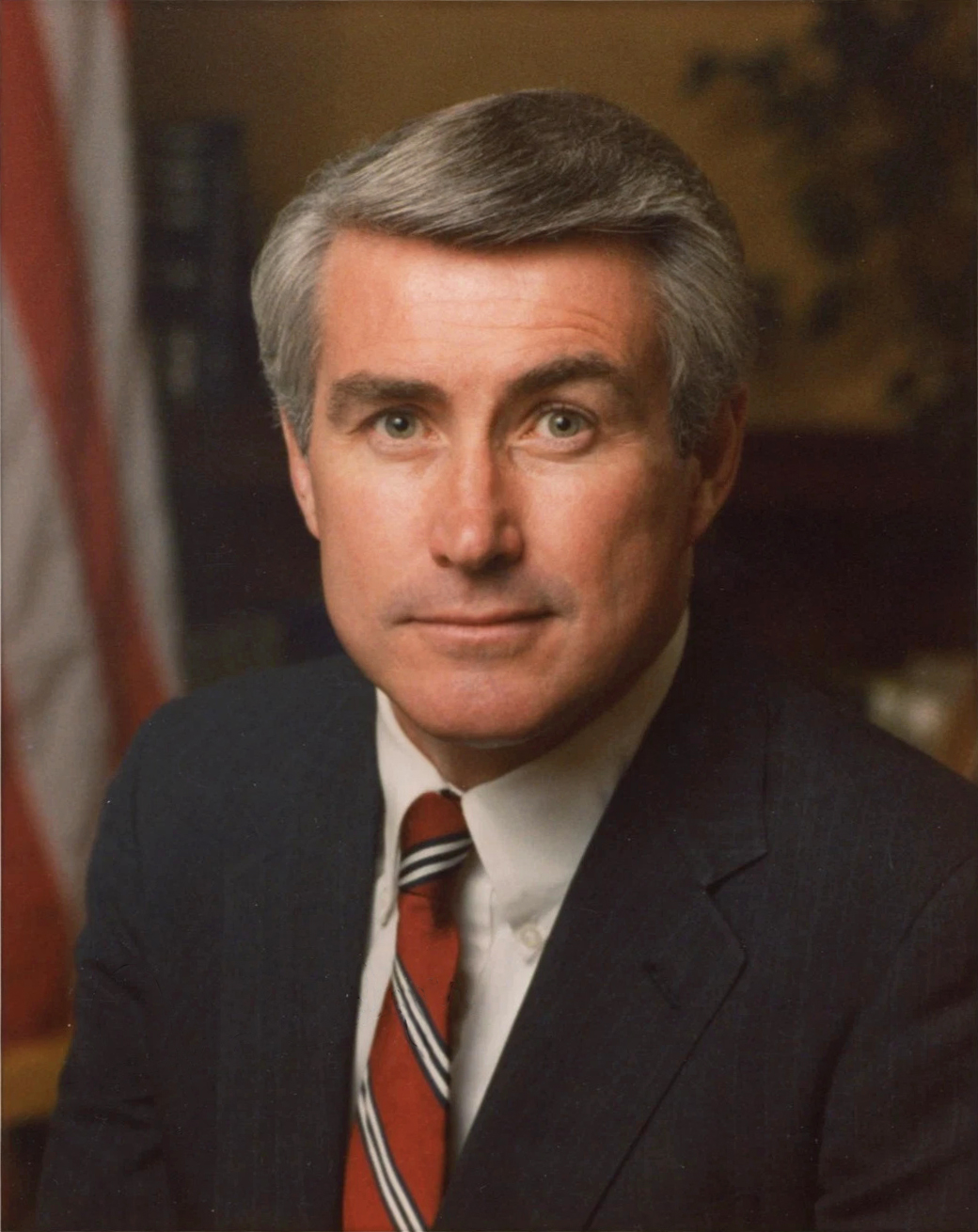
- Official portrait, 1989

38th Governor of Illinois
- In office January 14, 1991 – January 11, 1999
- Lieutenant: Bob Kustra
- Preceded by: Jim Thompson
- Succeeded by: George Ryan

35th Secretary of State of Illinois
- In office January 5, 1981 – January 14, 1991
- Governor: Jim Thompson
- Preceded by: Alan J. Dixon
- Succeeded by: George Ryan

Member of the Illinois House of Representatives from the 53rd district
- In office January 12, 1977 – March 8, 1979 Serving with Chuck Campbell and Larry Stuffle
- Preceded by: Max Coffey; Bob Craig
- Succeeded by: Harry Woodyard

Personal details
- Born: James Robert Edgar; July 22, 1946 Vinita, Oklahoma, U.S.
- Died: September 14, 2025 (aged 79) Springfield, Illinois, U.S.
- Party: Republican
- Spouse: Brenda Smith (m. 1967)
- Children: 2
- Education: Eastern Illinois University (BA)
- Website: Official website

James Robert Edgar (July 22, 1946 – September 14, 2025) was an American politician who served as the 38th governor of Illinois from 1991 to 1999. A Republican, he previously served in the Illinois House of Representatives from 1977 to 1979 and as the 35th secretary of state of Illinois from 1981 to 1991.

A native of Charleston, Illinois, Edgar began his political career as a legislative aide. He was elected to the Illinois House of Representatives in 1976 and reelected in 1978. In 1979, while still in his second term, Edgar resigned to become the director of legislative affairs for Governor Jim Thompson.

When incumbent Secretary of State Alan J. Dixon was elected to the Senate, Thompson appointed Edgar to serve the remainder of Dixon's term. Edgar would go on to win a full term in 1982 and was reelected by a significant margin in 1986 in a race complicated by a LaRouchian candidate on the Democratic ticket.

Edgar was elected governor in 1990, narrowly defeating incumbent Attorney General Neil Hartigan. During the Republican Revolution of 1994, he was reelected in a historic landslide over the Democratic state comptroller Dawn Clark Netsch—winning 101 of the state's 102 counties, including Cook County.

As governor, Edgar eliminated the state's budget deficit, managed the state's response to the Great Flood of 1993, and enacted the "Edgar Ramp," a bipartisan pension-funding plan that attempted to resolve Illinois's pension crisis. A moderate Republican, he retired from politics upon leaving office in 1999 and became a critic of Trumpism in his later years.

== Early life and education ==
James Robert Edgar was born on July 22, 1946, in Vinita, Oklahoma, to Cecil and Betty Edgar. Edgar and his family moved to Charleston, Illinois when he was three years old. His father, Cecil, died in an automobile accident in 1953, when Edgar was 7, leaving Jim and his two older brothers to be raised by their mother. To support the family, Betty Edgar worked as a clerk at Eastern Illinois University.

Edgar became interested in politics while following the 1952 presidential election. Although his parents were both Democrats, Edgar supported the Republican candidate, Dwight D. Eisenhower, and ran the Eisenhower campaign during his elementary school's mock election that year. Edgar would later recall, "I knew that Dwight Eisenhower was an army general, and any red-blooded American boy in 1952 would be for the army general, and I was for Eisenhower. That's how I became a Republican."

Edgar graduated from Charleston High School in 1964 and spent one year at Wabash College, an all-men's school, before transferring to Eastern Illinois University. While at Eastern Illinois, he met his future wife, Brenda, served on the student senate as the representative for the Young Republicans, and was elected student body president. He graduated with a bachelor's degree in history in 1968.

== Early political career ==
Edgar got his start in politics as a young "Rockefeller Republican." During the 1964 Republican Party presidential primaries, he worked as a campaign volunteer for Pennsylvania Governor William Scranton, organizing a rally for Scranton in Mattoon, Illinois. During the 1968 Republican Party presidential primaries, he supported the campaign of New York Governor Nelson Rockefeller.

Following his graduation from college, Edgar worked as a legislative intern and then personal assistant to Illinois Senate Republican leader W. Russell Arrington, despite his mother's wish for him to attend law school. Later in his political career, Edgar would call Arrington, who was a liberal Republican, his political role model. After serving under Arrington, Edgar went on to work briefly for the Republican Speaker of the Illinois House W. Robert Blair. He left Blair's office to make his first run for public office in 1974.

=== Illinois House of Representatives ===
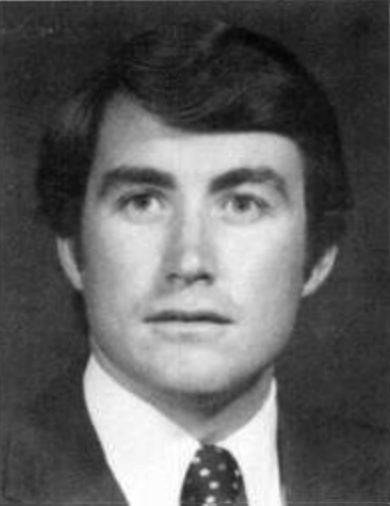
Rep. Edgar c. 1977

In 1974, Edgar ran unsuccessfully in the Republican primary for state representative from the 53rd district, coming in third place. After the campaign, Edgar worked as an insurance and cosmetics salesperson before briefly serving the National Conference of State Legislatures in Denver.

He ran for the same seat again two years later in 1976 and won. He was re-elected in 1978.

While in the House, Edgar served on the Appropriations II, Human Resources, and Revenue committees as well as the Illinois Commission on Intergovernmental Cooperation. Due to his moderate policy positions, Edgar was often considered a swing vote, especially on the Human Resources committee.

In April 1979, shortly after winning re-election, Edgar resigned his state House seat to accept an appointment from Governor Jim Thompson to be the governor's legislative liaison. Though reluctant at first, Edgar accepted Thompson's offer with a promise that Edgar would receive Thompson's support for a statewide office in the future. He worked in the governor's office as the director of legislative affairs until December 1980.

== Illinois Secretary of State ==
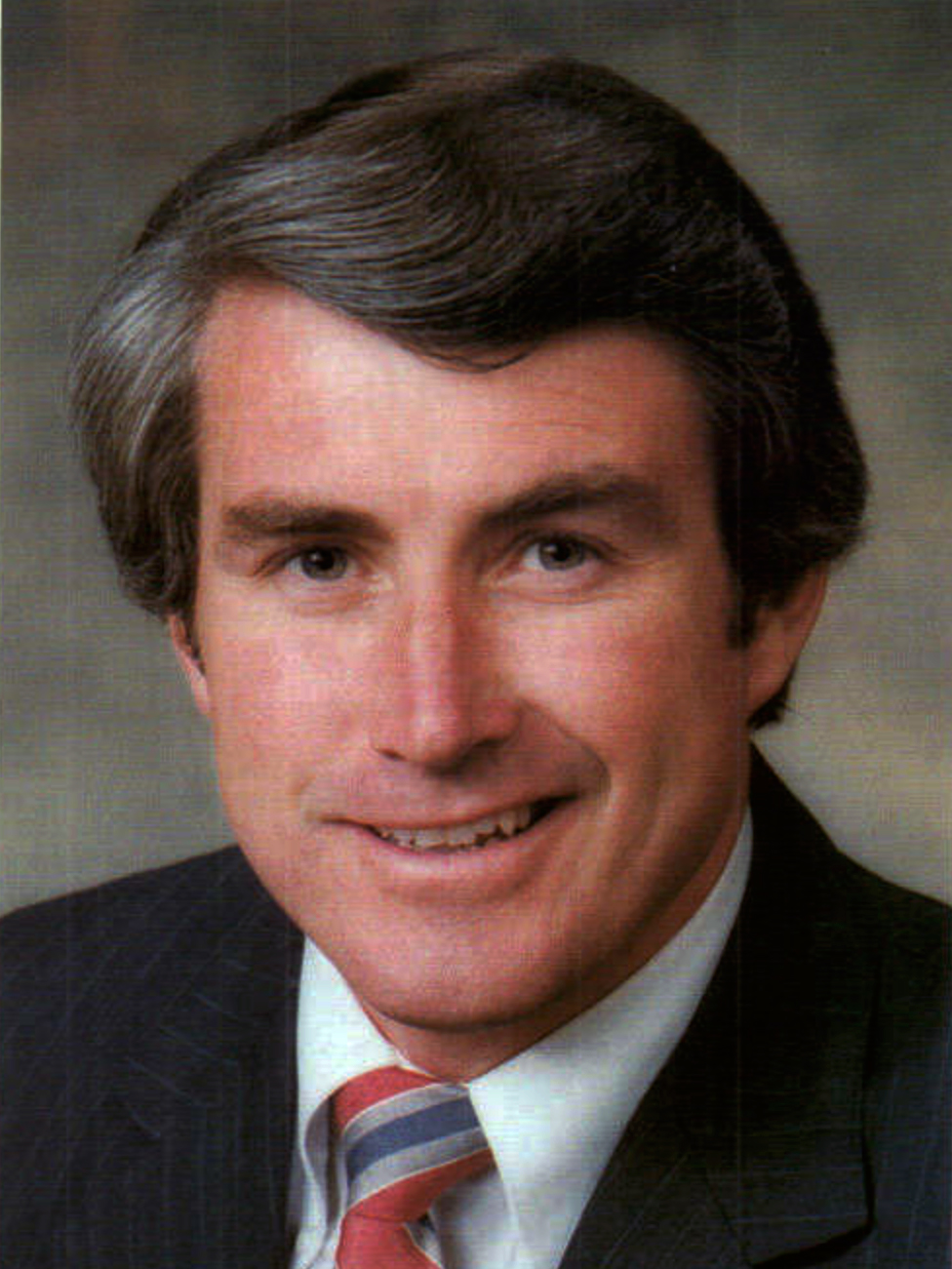
Illinois Secretary of State Edgar c. 1981

In January 1981, Governor Thompson announced Edgar's appointment as Illinois Secretary of State to fill the vacancy left by incumbent Secretary of State Alan Dixon following his 1980 election to the U.S. Senate. He won re-election twice in 1982 and 1986 with his 1986 re-election against the Illinois Solidarity Party nominee Jane N. Spirgel and the Lyndon LaRouche-backed Democratic nominee Janice A. Hart being the largest statewide margin of victory in Illinois history until the election of Barack Obama to the U.S. Senate in 2004.

During his first term as Secretary of State, Edgar diverged from past practices in the office by keeping many of the Democratic employees hired by his predecessor. He would later comment on his decision by saying "to me, the best politics is good government" and that in his view, as long as the employees did their jobs, he had no interest in firing them regardless of political affiliation.

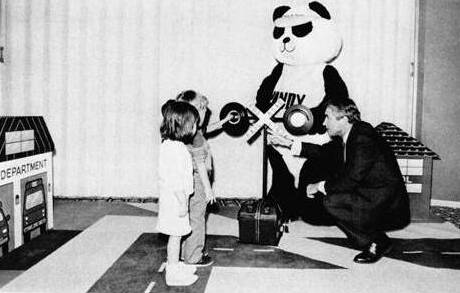
Edgar promotes "Project Panda," a youth-oriented traffic safety program, with two children. c. 1987

On policy, Edgar's partial term and first full term were largely defined by his work to toughen Illinois' drunk driving penalties. This included strengthening breathalyzer requirements for individuals pulled over for possibly driving under the influence and reforming the state's legal view of driver's licenses to be a "privilege, not a right," thereby allowing licenses to be administratively suspended pending a court date for potentially driving drunk as opposed to the prior system where drivers retained their licenses until their court date. Edgar also voiced support for a national 21-year-old legal drinking age and was appointed to U.S. President Ronald Reagan's Presidential Commission on Drunk Driving in 1982. Additionally, Edgar ended the practice of having the state's license plates manufactured by prisoners in state penitentiaries.

During his second term, Edgar spearheaded a successful legislative battle to pass a bill instituting mandatory automobile insurance for Illinois motorists, one of the first states in the nation to do so. Prior to Edgar's intervention, the bill had been routinely defeated by the state's insurance lobby. Edgar would later pick the Senate sponsor on the bill, Bob Kustra, to serve as his Lieutenant Governor.

Edgar, who was known to be an avid reader, also pushed forward an effort to construct a standalone Illinois State Library building. His efforts to support the State Library and love for books earned Edgar the nickname of "The Reader" from State Library employees. In May 2025, the reading room of the State Library was renamed in Edgar's honor by the Illinois Legislature in recognition of his work supporting the library and state literacy programs as Secertary of State.

=== 1990 Illinois gubernatorial election ===
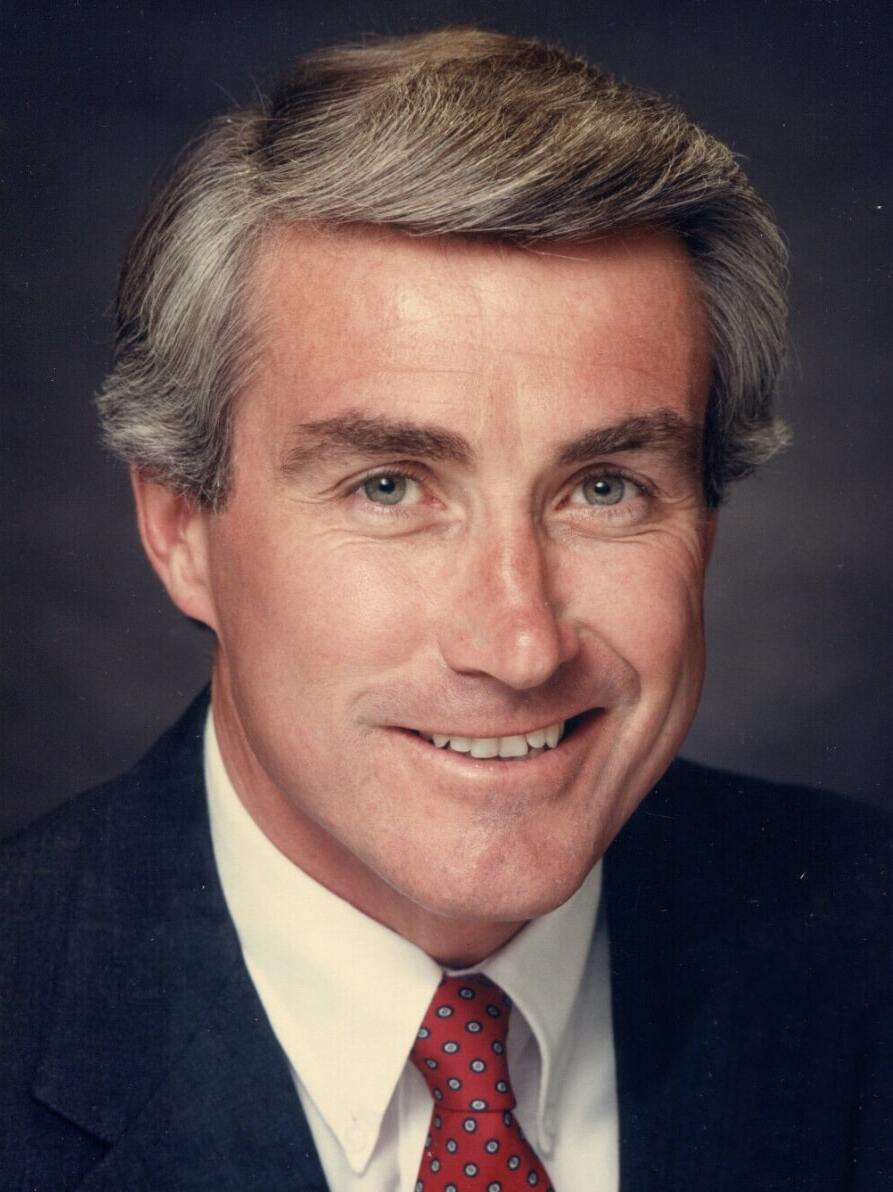
Illinois Secretary of State Edgar, c. 1987

On August 8, 1989, Edgar announced his candidacy for governor of Illinois following incumbent Governor Jim Thompson's decision not to seek a fifth term. Entering the race with Thompson's endorsement, Edgar quickly emerged as the frontrunner for the Republican nomination. Edgar's moderate-to-liberal policy positions attracted a primary challenge from conservative political activist Steve Baer. Baer criticized Edgar's support for abortion rights and his backing of making permanent a then-temporary 20% income tax surcharge. Edgar won the March 1990 Republican primary with just under 63% of the vote.

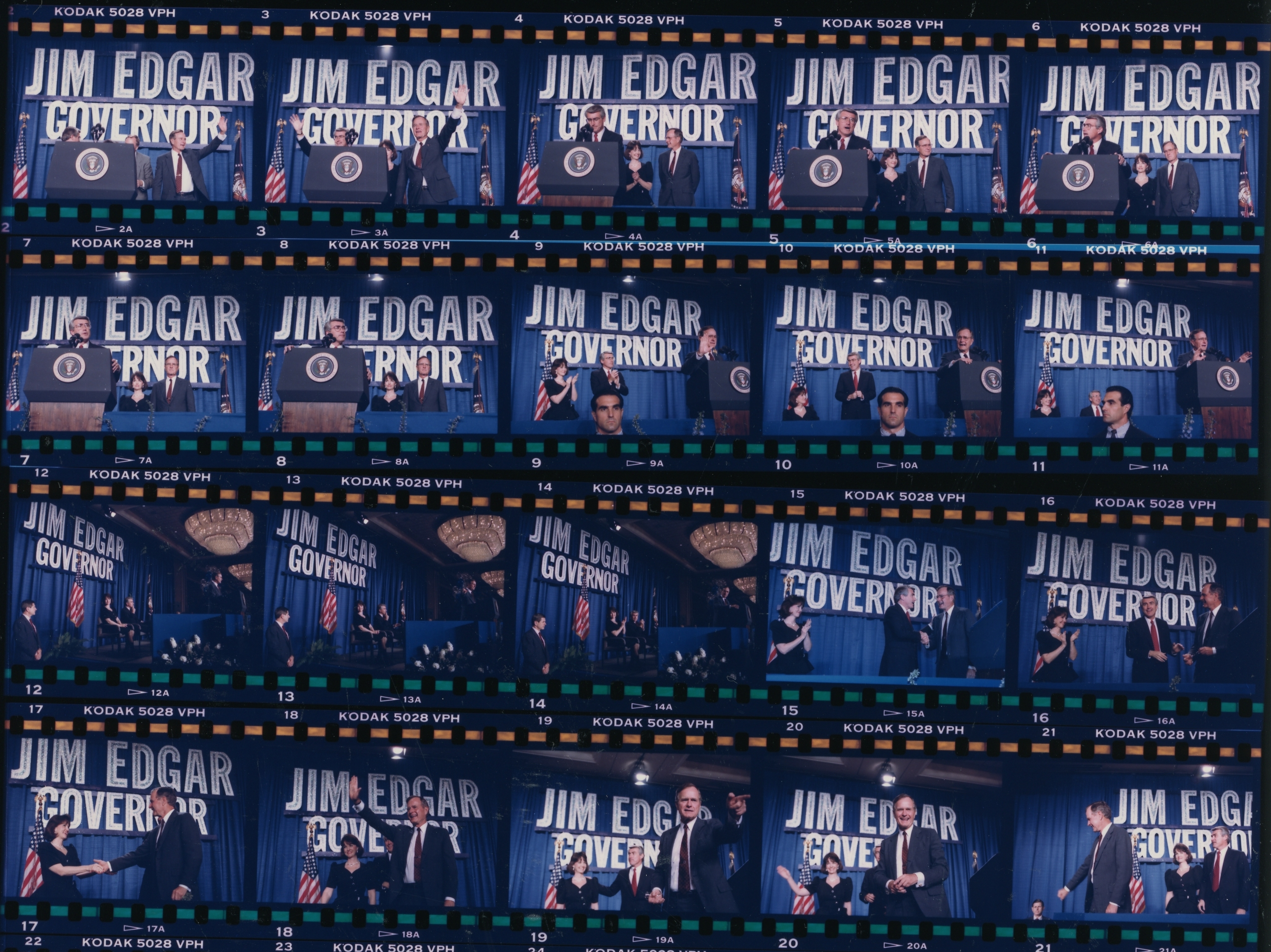
Film strips capturing an Edgar campaign event featuring President George H. W. Bush

In the general election, Edgar faced Democrat Neil Hartigan, the incumbent attorney general and former lieutenant governor. Hartigan began his career in Chicago's Democratic political machine as chief deputy to Mayor Richard J. Daley, eventually becoming one of the state's most prominent Democratic politicians during the 1970s and 1980s. Despite his record as an advocate for liberal causes, Hartigan campaigned to the right of Edgar on fiscal issues, opposing an extension of the 20% income tax surcharge.

Enacted in 1989, the surcharge temporarily raised Illinois's income tax rate by 20% for two years to provide additional funding for public schools and local governments. With the surcharge scheduled to expire in 1991, Edgar argued that making it permanent was essential to maintaining public school funding and preventing a further increase in the state's budget deficit, criticizing Hartigan's opposition as irresponsible. Hartigan, meanwhile, pledged to let the surcharge expire, proposing instead to provide the education funding through savings generated by a 2% reduction in overall government spending.

Throughout the campaign, Edgar framed himself as a consistent, pragmatic leader and attacked Hartigan as an indecisive policymaker prone to changing his positions, echoing an accusation that had been levied against Hartigan in the past. To emphasize the point, Edgar's campaign briefly ran a television ad featuring comedian Irwin Corey accusing Hartigan of waffling, and at a rally near the end of the campaign, Edgar held up a waffle and joked that it would become the state seal if Hartigan won.

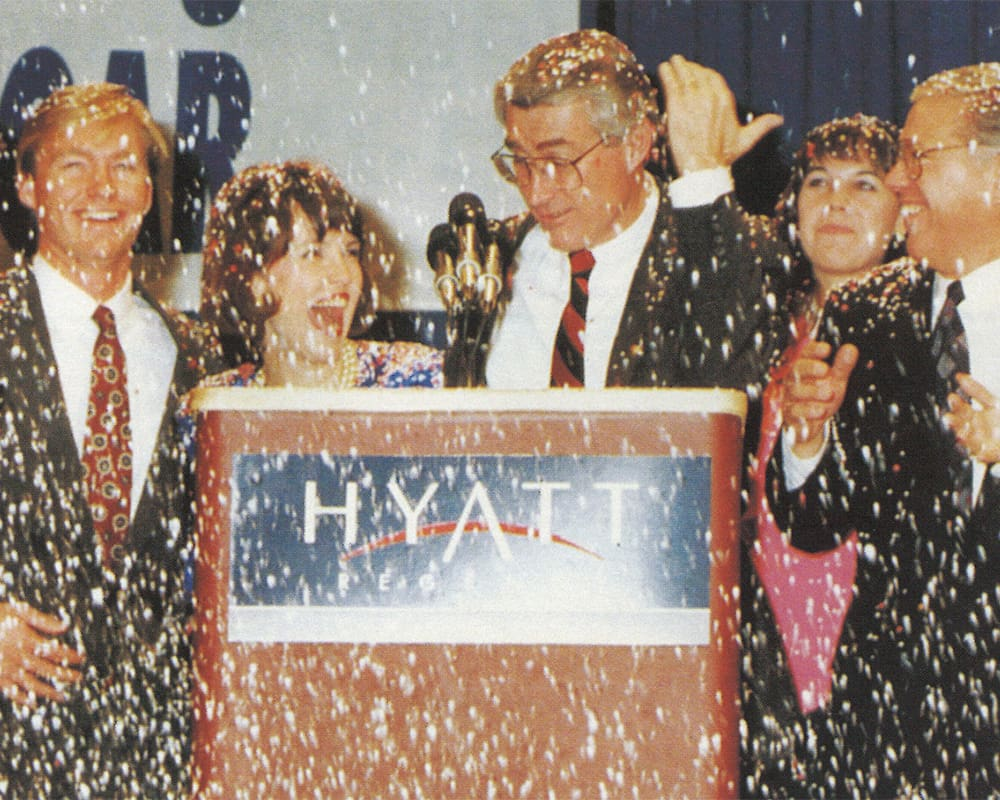
Edgar onstage with his family and Lt. Governor-elect Bob Kustra, after winning the election

A tough national environment for Republicans, a desire for change among the Illinois electorate, and poor polling led Edgar to believe he was going to lose. However, despite trailing Hartigan for most of election night, he narrowly won the election, becoming one of only two Republicans to win statewide office in Illinois that year.

1990 Illinois gubernatorial election results. Edgar won 50.75% to 48.17%

Edgar's stronger-than-expected showing in Chicago's majority-Black wards proved decisive in the closely contested race. Low turnout among Black voters in the city left Hartigan with smaller margins in Chicago than Democratic candidates typically received, a drop-off widely attributed to lingering dissatisfaction over his political history. During the 1987 Chicago mayoral election, Hartigan had initially backed his longtime political ally, Thomas Hynes, a white third-party candidate, over incumbent Harold Washington, the city's first Black mayor. Although Hartigan endorsed Washington after Hynes later withdrew, his initial support for Hynes amid Chicago's racially polarized political climate weakened his standing among Black voters.

Edgar capitalized on this rift by securing endorsements from several prominent Black activists who had been involved in Washington's campaigns, including Lu Palmer. Combined with the low turnout caused by dissatisfaction with Hartigan, these inroads enabled Edgar to win roughly 20% of the Black vote in Chicago, the best result for a Republican in decades. Political analysts estimated that Black Chicagoans accounted for approximately half of Edgar's 84,000-vote margin of victory.

== Governor of Illinois ==
=== First term (1991–1995) ===
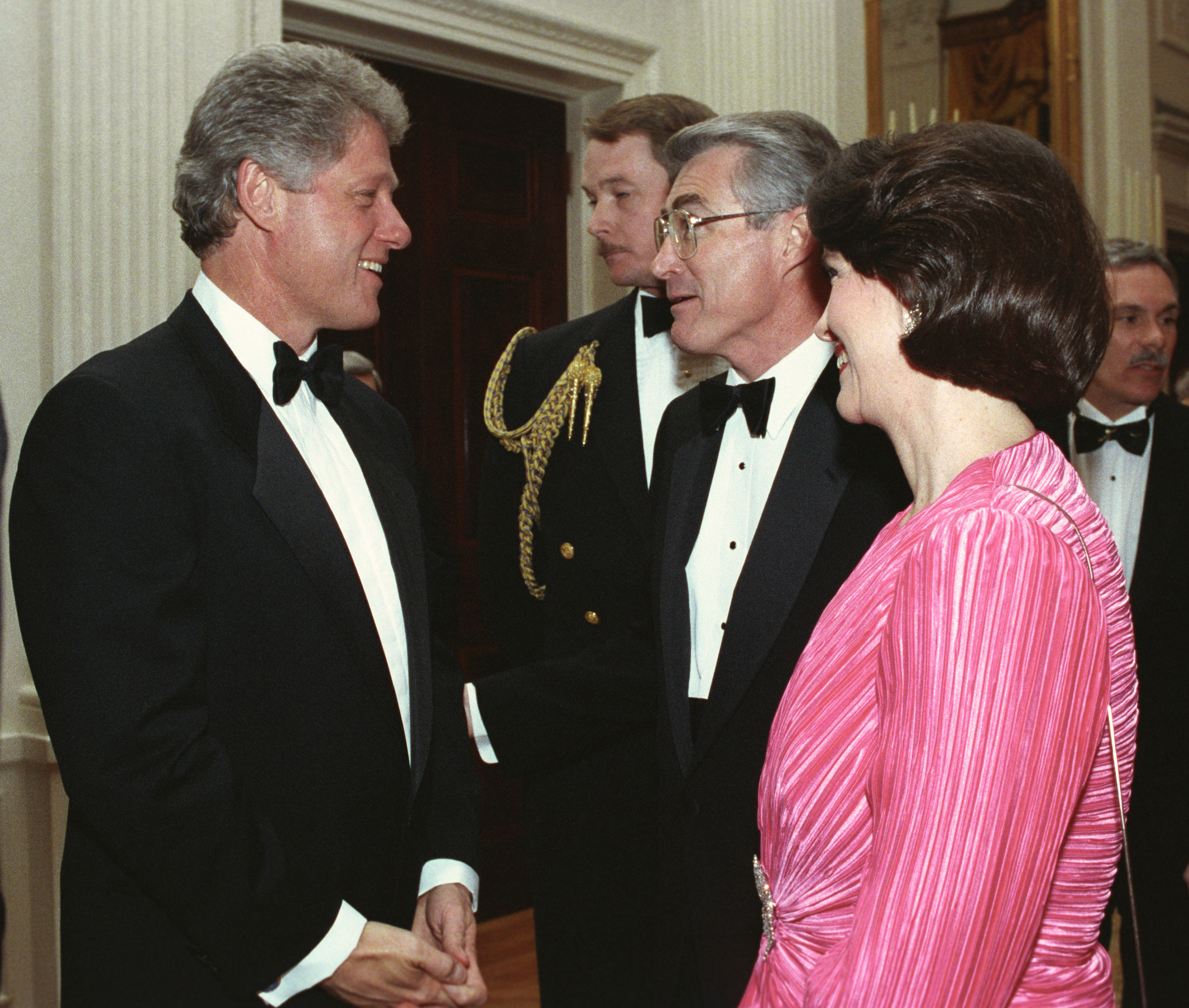
President Bill Clinton greets Edgar and his wife Brenda in January 1993

On January 14, 1991, Edgar took the oath of office as Governor of Illinois and gave his inaugural speech on fiscal responsibility. During the gubernatorial transition between the 1990 election and his inauguration, Edgar and his staff were made aware of a nearly billion-dollar deficit in state spending that he would have to deal with upon assuming office and though the exact size of the deficit was downplayed by the Illinois State Bureau of the Budget to the public and to the news-media of the time, it was still recognized to be the largest budget deficit in state history up to that point. Then, three weeks following Edgar's inauguration, the state began to feel stronger effects of the early 1990s recession, worsening the state's financial standing further.

To try and correct the state's finances, Edgar's first proposed budget for the fiscal year 1992 included no tax increases and extensive cuts to state spending totaling in the millions of dollars—with the exception of education, which received a slight increase. This budget ran into conflict with the Democrat-controlled Illinois General Assembly and a months-long budget fight ensued between Edgar and Illinois House Speaker Mike Madigan over his proposals. After months of negotiations, the two reached a compromise in mid-July that included most of Edgar's initial spending cuts, made permanent the temporary income tax surcharge that had dominated the 1990 campaign, and established property tax caps in all counties except Cook. Edgar would have two more significant budget fights in 1992 and 1993 and the state's financial troubles would dominate much of Edgar's first term.

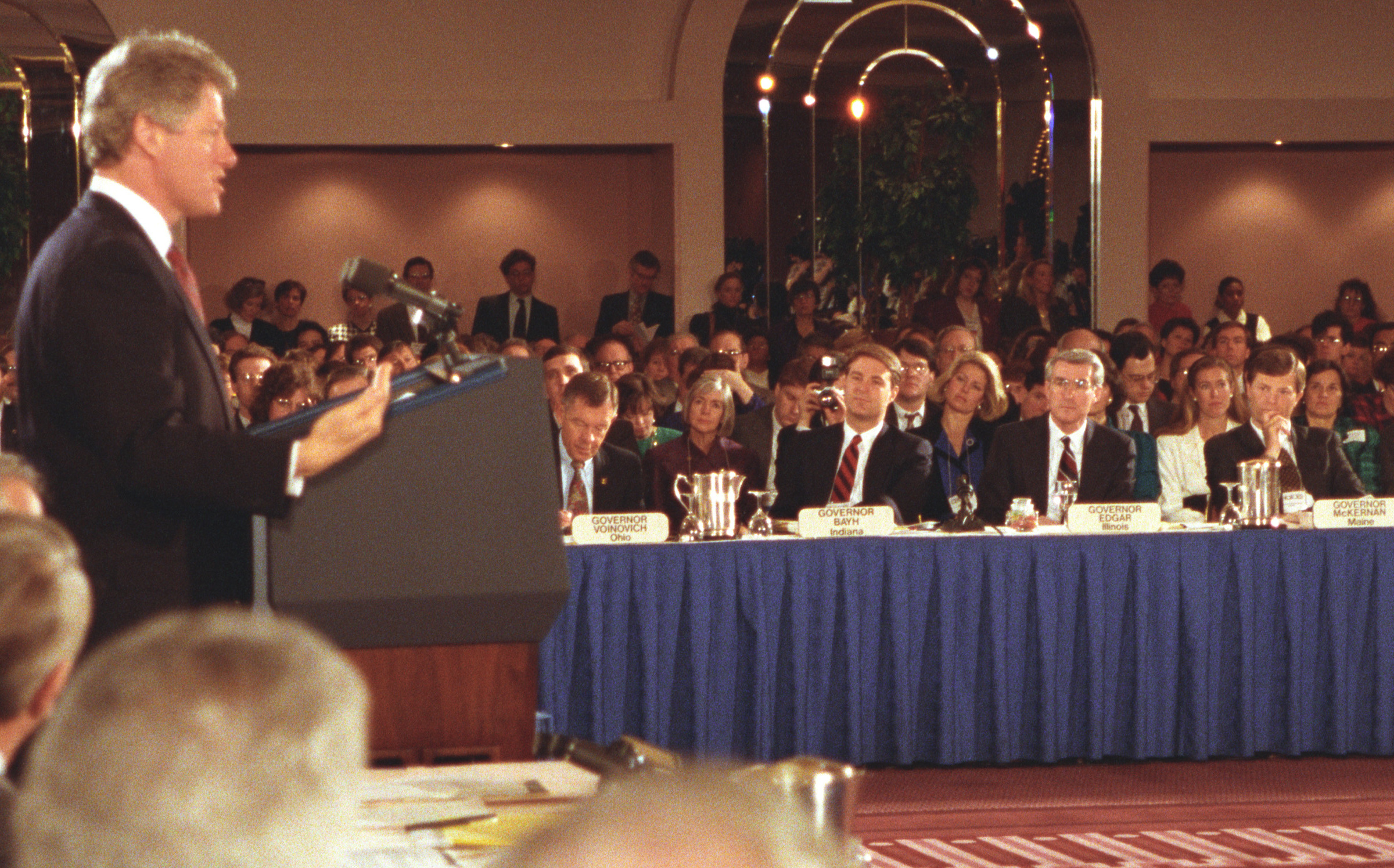
Edgar (second from right) and other governors watch President Bill Clinton address the winter meeting of the National Governors Association in February 1993

In between budget fights, Edgar also sought to reform the Illinois Department of Children and Family Services, which had been put under court supervision following an ACLU lawsuit three years prior to Edgar taking office. Edgar enacted a bipartisan package of welfare reforms in 1994 focused on increasing scrutiny in abuse-related death investigations, establishing methods of stopping child abuse before it occurs, and requiring the department to draft standardized training procedures and guidelines for caseworkers.

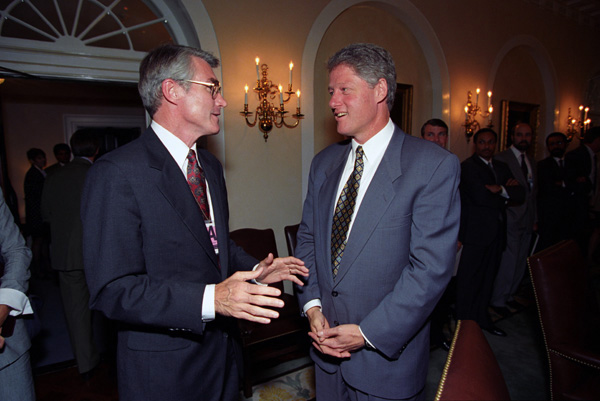
Edgar speaks with President Bill Clinton during a meeting held for Midwestern governors of states affected by flooding in July 1993

On April 24, 1993, Edgar declared Kane, Lake, and McHenry counties disaster areas due to flooding. This would be the first of many actions Edgar would take to curb the devastation of the Great Flood of 1993, later be regarded as one of the worst natural disasters in Illinois history. Edgar would also mobilize over 7,000 members of the Illinois National Guard to flood duty over the course of the disaster and organize hundreds of inmates from the Illinois Department of Corrections to help with sandbagging and levee-reinforcement. Edgar would also help with sandbagging efforts himself throughout the summer.

==== Addressing pensions ====
In 1994, Edgar signed into law Public Act 88-593, a bipartisan compromise bill between Edgar and Illinois House Speaker Mike Madigan to address the state's developing pension crisis. After the bill was passed unanimously by the General Assembly, Edgar told The State Journal-Register "We had a time bomb in our retirement system that was going to go off in the first part of the 21st century. This legislation defuses that time bomb."

Prior to 1981, the State of Illinois funded pensions on an "as-you-go" basis, making benefit payouts as they came due, with employee contributions and investment income funding a reserve to cover future payouts. This approach was stopped in 1982 due to strains on the Illinois budget and state contributions remained flat between 1982 and 1995, resulting in an underfunding of pensions by approximately $20 billion. Public Act 88-593 set out a schedule to raise the state's pension funding ratio from the then flat 52% liability to 90% by 2045 with mandatory yearly payments and a 15-year ramp period at the start where the state's payments would begin low and increase at an escalating rate yearly. It would be from this 'ramp' period that the funding plan would gain the colloquial name 'the Edgar ramp.' The Edgar plan included a provision that state pension payments would be made automatically, just as the state bond payments.

Despite being predicted as a bipartisan success at the time, the plan was not able to correct the state's pension issues long-term. It suffered setbacks during Rod Blagojevich's time as governor, when lawmakers underfunded the system by $2.3 billion in 2006 and 2007. This was followed by the 2008 global recession. The Illinois pension crisis continues into the present day, with Illinois' public pensions being the worst-funded in the nation as of 2023.

=== 1994 Illinois gubernatorial election ===
1994 Illinois gubernatorial election results. Edgar won 63.87% to 34.44%

On November 9, 1993, Edgar announced his intention to run for a second term as Governor of Illinois. In the spring primary, Edgar faced only token opposition from Jack Roeser, a self-funded conservative businessman who challenged Edgar from the right in a fashion similar to activist Steve Baer four years prior. The primary race received little coverage and Edgar won renomination in a landslide.

Edgar had initially anticipated that his general election opponent would be Richard Phelan, President of the Cook County Board of Commissioners, but he instead faced incumbent Democratic State Comptroller Dawn Clark Netsch. Edgar's campaign sought to neutralize Netsch early in the campaign season with a $750,000 ad blitz in June that characterized her as "soft on crime." The Netsch campaign, recovering from the costs of the Democratic primary, struggled to respond and Netsch was held back from campaigning that month by her official duties as comptroller.

In early July, following weeks of chest pains, Edgar scheduled an appointment with a cardiologist at the Midwest Cardiovascular Institute. Following an angiogram, Edgar was informed that he needed to undergo an emergency surgery due to a 95 percent blockage of his left anterior descending artery. Though the procedure was successful, it raised concerns about the viability of his re-election campaign. Despite this, Edgar led in the polls and fundraising for most of the campaign and won re-election in a historic landslide victory.

Edgar's reelection victory is to date the closest a gubernatorial candidate in Illinois has come to winning every single county in the state; Edgar won 101 of the state's 102 counties, including the historically Democratic stronghold of Cook County, and lost Gallatin County by a mere 3 votes, less than 0.01%.

=== Second term (1995–1999) ===
In his second term, Edgar maintained a focus on fiscal stability over his second term. He increased education funding, paid many of the state's previously unpaid bills, and improved Illinois' bond ratings. He also enacted the first income tax relief for Illinois workers in nearly three decades.

At the start of his second term, Edgar passed educational reforms including a major overhaul of the organizational structure of Chicago's public schools, creating an oversight board and introducing increased measures for academic accountability. These changes improved test scores, attendance and graduation rates. In 1997, Edgar championed and signed a law guaranteeing minimum funding per student for every school in the state and launched the state's first major school construction program.

Following his first term's reforms to the Illinois Department of Children and Family Services, Edgar and First Lady Brenda Edgar launched Project Heart (Helping to Ease Adoption Red Tape) to streamline the adoption process in Illinois. Reforms included faster backgrounds checks and fingerprinting processes, new courtrooms to speed parental rights cases, reduced filing fees, and waived fees for children with special needs. As a result, adoption times were cut in half and adoptions rose from 708 to 4,293 during Edgar's tenure.

In 1996, under Edgar's administration, 19,000 acres of a former Joliet Army Ammunition Plant was converted into the Midewin National Tallgrass Prairie, the first federally designated tallgrass prairie in the U.S., with other designated areas of the plant being set aside for veterans and economic development. Edgar's administration also partnered with the U.S. Fish and Wildlife Service to manage the 13,000-acre Savanna Army Depot, preserving diverse natural habitats and supporting endangered species.

Also in 1996, Edgar was interviewed by Republican presidential nominee Bob Dole about being his vice-presidential running mate. Edgar considered his selection to be a long-shot due to his pro-choice views but said he was "flattered to be considered" and quipped that the selection process had helped him "get better tables in restaurants" and "a couple of free horse rides" while on vacation. Other than himself, Edgar voiced support for retired Joint Chiefs of Staff Chairman Colin Powell or New Jersey Governor Christine Todd Whitman as possible running mates for Dole. Dole ultimately chose former United States Secretary of Housing and Urban Development Jack Kemp.

Despite his pro-choice views, Edgar signed into law the Parental Notification of Abortion Act during his second term.

During his second term, the relationship between Edgar's re-election campaign and Management Systems of Illinois (MSI), Edgar's largest campaign contributor, came under federal scrutiny. MSI had been granted a state contract that cost an estimated $20 million in overcharges. Edgar was never accused of wrongdoing, but he testified twice at the request of the defense, once in court and once by videotape, becoming the first sitting Illinois governor to take the witness stand in a criminal case in 75 years. In those appearances, the governor insisted political donations played no role in who received state contracts. Convictions were obtained against two men involved with Management Services of Illinois: Michael Martin, who had been a partner of Management Services of Illinois, and Ronald Lowder, who had been a state welfare administrator and later worked for Management Services of Illinois.

In 1997, Edgar announced he would retire from politics at the end of his term, ending speculation that he would run for reelection or for the U.S. Senate the following year. "I've enjoyed what I've done, but I've done it," Edgar said at the time, "I always thought 'I want to go out on top.' Some people stay too long in politics. Sometimes if you don't go out on top, they throw you out." He added that his decision was not impacted by his history of heart issues. Subsequently, Edgar supported Secretary of State George Ryan's successful candidacy to succeed him in 1998.

Edgar left office in January 1999 with high approval ratings, something he maintained for most of his two terms, including a high of 73% in 1995.

== Post-governorship ==
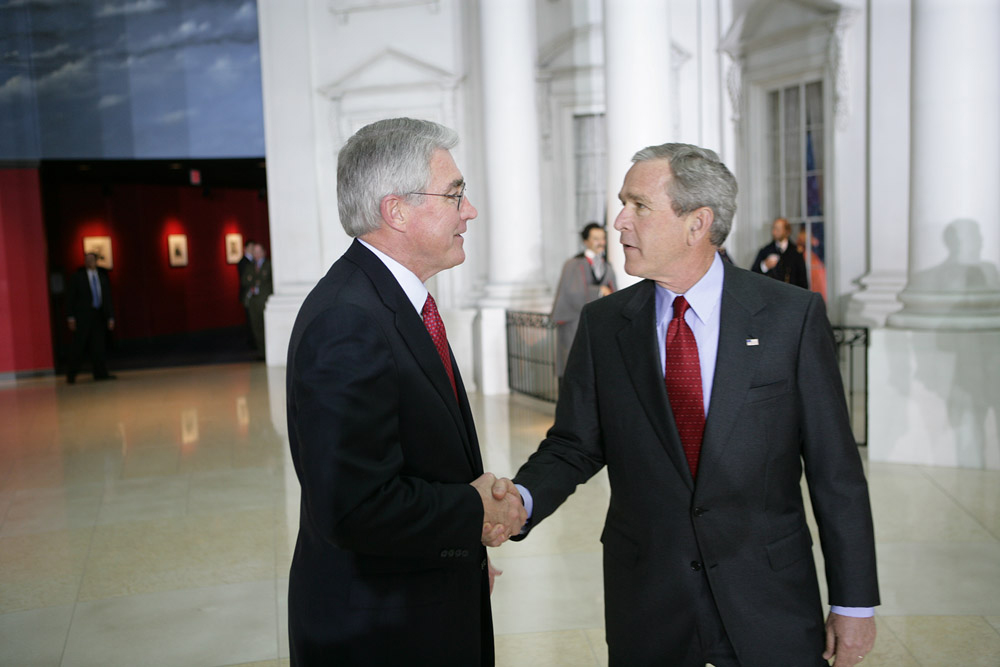
Edgar with President George W. Bush at the opening of the Abraham Lincoln Presidential Library and Museum in 2005

Edgar was encouraged to return to elected office more than once following his retirement from the governorship in 1999. In 2003, President George W. Bush lobbied Edgar to run in the upcoming 2004 Senate election to replace outgoing Republican U.S. Senator Peter Fitzgerald. In 2005, an effort was launched on the grassroots level to convince Edgar to run for a third gubernatorial term in 2006. Edgar declined to be a candidate in both races.

In 1999, Edgar was inducted as a Laureate of The Lincoln Academy of Illinois and awarded the Order of Lincoln (Illinois's highest honor) by his successor, Governor George Ryan, in the area of Government.

Also in 1999, Edgar was elected a fellow of the National Academy of Public Administration. Edgar also served as a resident fellow at the John F. Kennedy School of Government at Harvard University and a distinguished fellow of the Institute of Government & Public Affairs at the University of Illinois Urbana-Champaign. Edgar, who had supported the creation of the Abraham Lincoln Presidential Library and Museum as governor, also served as chairman of the presidential library's foundation during the 2000s.

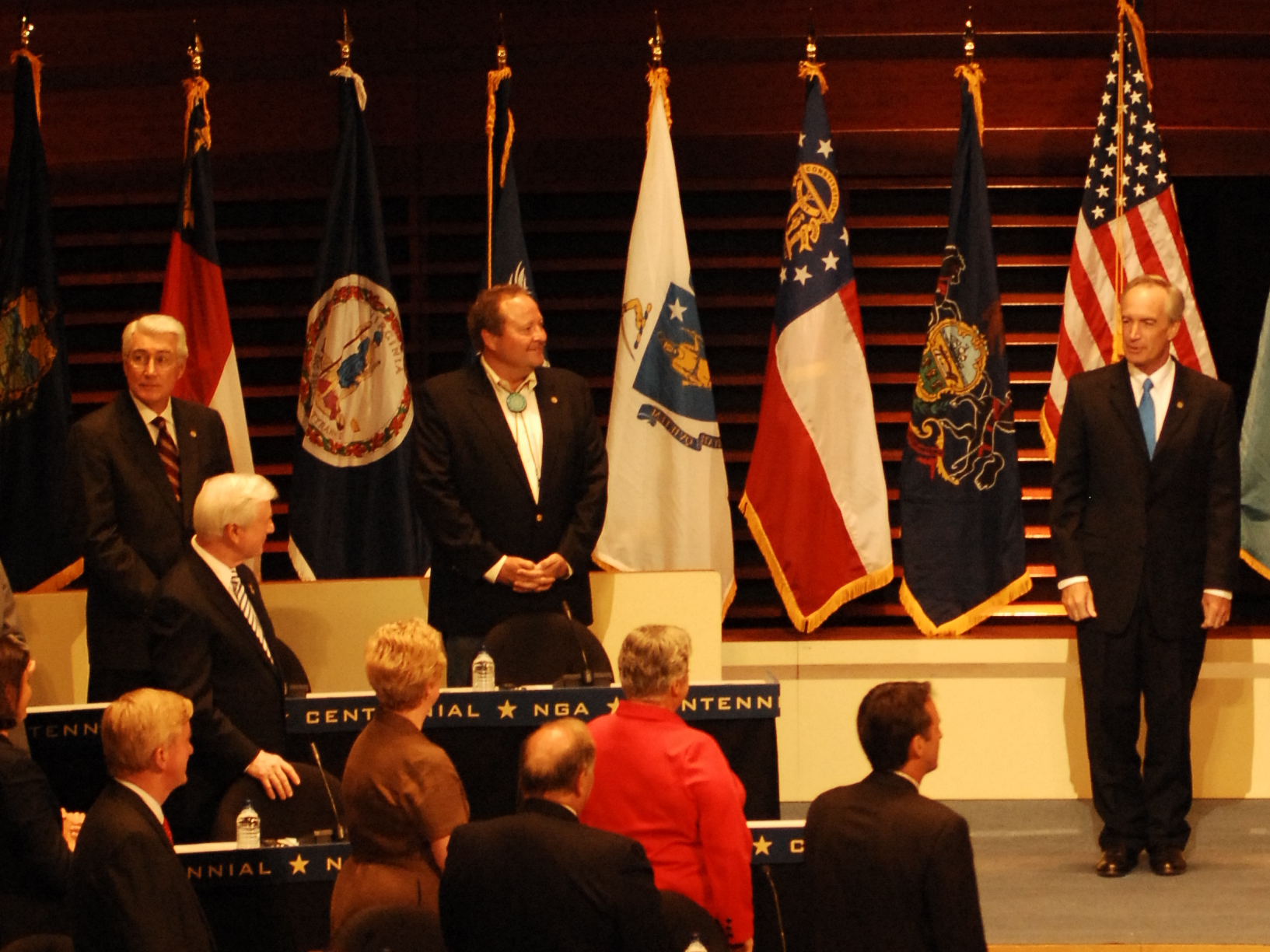
Edgar (top left) with other current and former governors, including Secretary of the Interior Dirk Kempthorne (top right), at the National Governors Association Centennial Meeting in Philadelphia in 2008

In 2010, Edgar was named the honorary chairman of the Ronald Reagan Centennial Celebration at Eureka College, President Reagan's alma mater. In 2012, Edgar donated the trophy awarded to the winner of the newly created Lincoln Bowl, which is now played annually between Knox College and Eureka College, two Illinois colleges where Abraham Lincoln spoke.

In the spring of 2016, during the then-ongoing Illinois budget impasse, Edgar said that Governor Bruce Rauner should sign the Democratic budget and support the Democratic pension plan in order to end the impasse. In July 2016, the Chicago Sun-Times reported that Illinois Financing Partners, a firm for which Edgar served as chairman, won approval by the state to advance money to state vendors who had been waiting for payments by the state. In turn, the firm would get to keep late payment fees when Illinois finally pays following the budget impasse.

=== Presidential endorsements ===
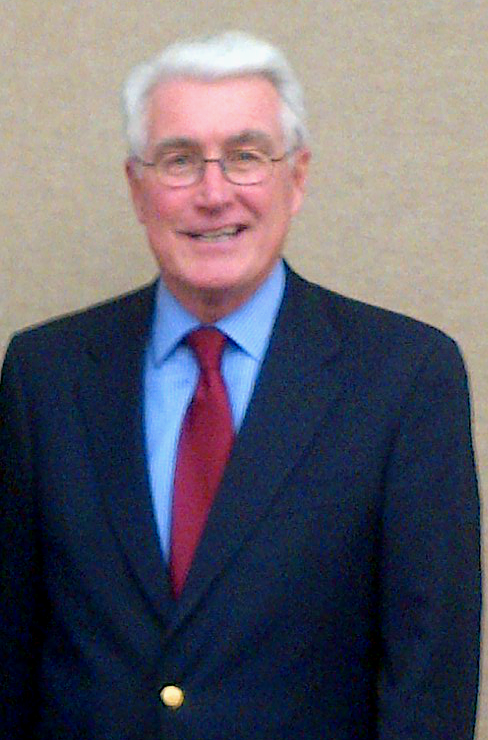
Edgar in 2013

In the lead-up to the 2008 Republican presidential primaries, Edgar endorsed former Mayor of New York City Rudy Giuliani for President of the United States. After Giuliani dropped out, Edgar endorsed Republican John McCain. During the 2012 presidential election, Edgar supported former Massachusetts Governor Mitt Romney, though he believed Romney went "farther right than he really had to go" in the 2012 Republican presidential primaries and thought he should prioritize an economic message in the general election.

When Donald Trump won the Republican nomination in 2016, Edgar publicly announced that he would not be voting for him. Edgar also supported Democrats Joe Biden and Kamala Harris in the 2020 and 2024 presidential elections, respectively. In 2020, Edgar told Peoria-area newspaper the Peoria Journal Star on Trump, "I have been very disappointed. We've had chaos for four years we didn't need to have. I mean, there's always going to be some turmoil, but he stirs it up. He bullies. You can't believe what he says because he'll do the different thing the next day. ... He's bungled the virus, there's no doubt about that. He continued to stir up division in the country, [when] a president should be trying to bring people together. I mean, the list goes on and on." In 2024, Edgar called Trump "the biggest disaster we've ever had in American government" and said that the Republican party under Trump was "not the Republican party I was involved in."

== Personal life and death ==
Edgar married Brenda Smith in 1967. The two met while going to classes at Eastern Illinois University. They had two children, Brad and Elizabeth. Edgar was an American Baptist.

Edgar always made a point of being public about the health problems he faced, including an angioplasty, a gall bladder removal surgery and a quadruple bypass surgery. In February 2025, Edgar announced that he had been diagnosed with pancreatic cancer. In September 2025, Edgar was hospitalized in Springfield due to an adverse reaction to his pancreatic cancer treatment. He died on September 14, 2025, at the age of 79.

A few months before he died, as he was undergoing cancer treatment, Edgar said he wanted to be remembered as a "good, good public servant", who "tried to do what he thought was the right thing."

Political offices
Preceded by Alan J. Dixon	Secretary of State of Illinois; 1981–1991	Succeeded by George Ryan
Preceded by James R. Thompson	Governor of Illinois; 1991–1999	Succeeded by George Ryan
Party political offices
Preceded by Sharon Sharp	Republican nominee for Secretary of State of Illinois; 1982, 1986	Succeeded by George Ryan
Preceded by James R. Thompson	Republican nominee for Governor of Illinois; 1990, 1994	Succeeded by George Ryan
