= 1994 Illinois gubernatorial election =

- November 8, 1994
- Turnout: 50.77% ▼3.23 pp
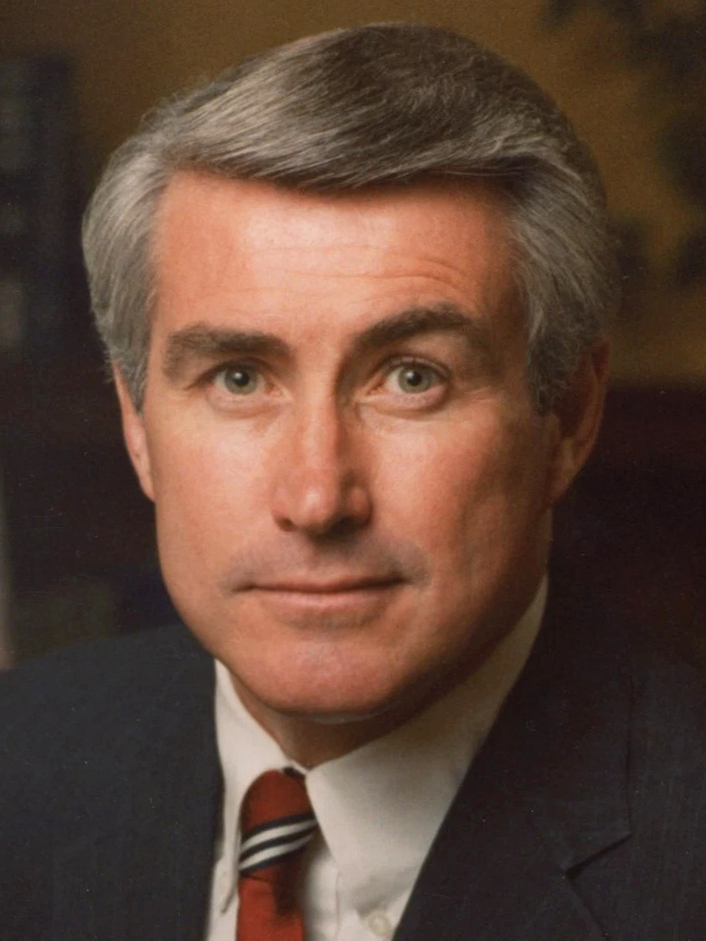

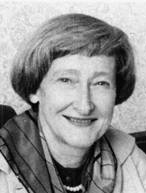
Nominee	Jim Edgar	Dawn Clark Netsch
Party	Republican	Democratic
Running mate	Bob Kustra	Penny Severns
Popular vote	1,984,318	1,069,850
Percentage	63.87%	34.44%
- County results Edgar: 50–60% 60–70% 70–80% 80–90% Netsch: 40–50%
Governor before election
Jim Edgar
Republican
Elected Governor
Jim Edgar
Republican

The 1994 Illinois gubernatorial election was held on November 8, 1994. Incumbent Republican Governor Jim Edgar won reelection in a landslide. Edgar carried 101 of the state's 102 counties over the Democratic nominee, State Comptroller Dawn Clark Netsch, with Netsch only winning Gallatin County by a narrow margin. This was the first time in Illinois that a woman was a major party's nominee for governor, with 2006 being the only other time.

To date, this is the most recent statewide election in which Cook County voted for a Republican candidate, a Republican governor won a second term in Illinois, and the last time any gubernatorial candidate received over 60% of the vote. Clark Netsch's 34% of the vote was the worst performance for a Democratic gubernatorial nominee in almost a century.

Additionally, this is to date the closest a gubernatorial candidate has ever come to winning every single county in the state; Edgar lost Gallatin County by a mere 3 votes, less than 0.10%.

Edgar won 70% of whites and 20% of African Americans.

== Background ==
The primaries and general elections coincided with those for Congress, as well as those for other state offices. The election was part of the 1994 Illinois elections.

The 1994 midterm elections saw a strong showing by the Republican Party, which was dubbed the "Republican Revolution".

For the primaries, turnout for the gubernatorial primaries was 29.16%, with 1,794,357 votes cast and turnout for the lieutenant gubernatorial primaries was 23.44% with 1,442,160 votes cast. For the general election, turnout was 50.77%, with 3,106,556 votes cast.

== Democratic primaries ==
=== Governor ===
==== Candidates ====
- Roland Burris, Illinois Attorney General
- James Elroy Gierach
- Sheila A. Jones, perennial candidate
- Dawn Clark Netsch, Illinois Comptroller
- Richard Phelan, President of the Cook County Board of Commissioners

==== Results ====
Democratic gubernatorial primary results
Party	Candidate	Votes	%
Democratic	Dawn Clark Netsch	487,364	44.35
Democratic	Roland W. Burris	401,142	36.50
Democratic	Richard Phelan	160,576	14.61
Democratic	James Elroy Gierach	26,752	2.43
Democratic	Sheila A. Jones	23,191	2.11
Total votes		1,099,025	100.00

=== Lieutenant governor ===
==== Candidates ====
- Anthony P. Harper
- Penny Severns, Illinois State Senator
- Sheila Smith

Democratic lieutenant gubernatorial primary results
Party	Candidate	Votes	%
Democratic	Penny Severns	406,510	45.75
Democratic	Sheila Smith	366,760	41.27
Democratic	Anthony P. Harper	115,347	12.98
Total votes		888,617	100

== Republican primaries ==
=== Governor ===
==== Candidates ====
- Jim Edgar, incumbent governor
- Jack Roeser, businessman

==== Results ====
Republican gubernatorial primary results
Party	Candidate	Votes	%
Republican	Jim Edgar (incumbent)	521,590	75.01
Republican	Jack Roeser	173,742	23.89
Total votes		695,332	100.00

=== Lieutenant governor ===
==== Candidates ====
- Bob Kustra, incumbent lieutenant governor

==== Results ====
Republican lieutenant gubernatorial primary results
Party	Candidate	Votes	%
Republican	Bob Kustra (incumbent)	553,543	100
Total votes		553,543	100

== General election ==
=== Polling ===
Source	Date	Jim Edgar (R)	Dawn Clark Netsch (D)
Chicago Tribune	October 30, 1994	60%	25%
Chicago Tribune	October 23, 1994	61%	22%

=== Results ===
1994 gubernatorial election, Illinois
Party	Candidate	Votes	%	±%
Republican	Jim Edgar (incumbent)	1,984,318	63.9	+13.1
Democratic	Dawn Clark Netsch	1,069,850	34.4	−13.8
Libertarian	David L. Kelley	52,388	1.69	+1.69
Write-in		10	0.0	n-a
Majority		914,468	29.5	
Turnout		3,106,556	50.77	
Republican hold		Swing		

==== By county ====
County	Jim Edgar		Dawn Clark Netsch		David Kelley		Write-in		Margin		Total
County	#	%	#	%	#	%	#	%	#	%	Total
Adams	15,656	79.90%	3,573	18.23%	366	1.87%	0	0.00%	12,083	61.67%	19,595
Alexander	2,347	68.37%	1,045	30.44%	41	1.19%	0	0.00%	1,302	37.93%	3,433
Bond	3,628	66.08%	1,731	31.53%	131	2.39%	0	0.00%	1,897	34.55%	5,490
Boone	7,128	75.02%	2,081	21.90%	293	3.08%	0	0.00%	5,047	53.12%	9,502
Brown	1,974	77.59%	527	20.72%	43	1.69%	0	0.00%	1,447	56.87%	2,544
Bureau	9,974	70.41%	3,921	27.68%	271	1.19%	0	0.00%	6,053	42.73%	14,166
Calhoun	1,267	59.54%	802	37.69%	59	2.77%	0	0.00%	465	21.85%	2,128
Carroll	4,463	76.47%	1,254	21.49%	119	2.04%	0	0.00%	3,209	54.98%	5,836
Cass	3,205	65.25%	1,632	33.22%	75	1.53%	0	0.00%	1,573	32.03%	4,912
Champaign	30,468	67.02%	14,334	31.53%	662	1.46%	0	0.00%	16,134	35.49%	45,464
Christian	6,880	59.94%	4,411	38.43%	188	1.64%	0	0.00%	2,469	21.51%	11,479
Clark	4,079	71.59%	1,511	26.52%	108	1.90%	0	0.00%	2,568	45.07%	5,698
Clay	3,095	71.17%	1,183	27.20%	71	1.63%	0	0.00%	1,912	43.97%	4,349
Clinton	8,235	70.38%	3,216	27.49%	249	2.13%	0	0.00%	5,019	42.89%	11,700
Coles	11,494	75.40%	3,442	22.58%	309	2.03%	0	0.00%	8,052	52.82%	15,245
Cook	634,353	52.04%	568,737	46.66%	15,854	1.30%	7	0.00%	65,616	5.38%	1,218,951
Crawford	4,978	73.12%	1,733	25.46%	97	1.42%	0	0.00%	3,245	47.66%	6,808
Cumberland	2,909	72.20%	1,027	25.49%	93	2.31%	0	0.00%	1,882	46.71%	4,029
DeKalb	13,354	71.40%	4,942	26.42%	408	2.18%	0	0.00%	8,412	44.98%	18,704
DeWitt	4,218	75.46%	1,294	23.15%	78	1.40%	0	0.00%	2,924	52.31%	5,590
Douglas	4,721	78.41%	1,215	20.18%	85	1.41%	0	0.00%	3,506	58.23%	6,021
DuPage	179,395	78.51%	45,548	19.93%	3,564	1.56%	0	0.00%	133,847	58.58%	228,507
Edgar	4,678	77.40%	1,306	21.61%	60	1.00%	0	0.00%	3,372	48.79%	6,044
Edwards	1,918	70.26%	768	28.13%	44	1.61%	0	0.00%	1,150	42.13%	2,730
Effingham	8,800	75.47%	2,615	22.43%	245	2.10%	0	0.00%	6,185	53.04%	11,660
Fayette	5,112	69.05%	2,128	28.75%	163	2.20%	0	0.00%	2,984	40.30%	7,403
Ford	3,815	80.76%	846	17.91%	63	1.33%	0	0.00%	2,969	62.85%	4,724
Franklin	8,554	60.38%	5,280	37.27%	334	2.36%	0	0.00%	3,274	23.11%	14,168
Fulton	7,490	65.30%	3,737	32.58%	244	2.13%	0	0.00%	3,753	32.72%	11,471
Gallatin	1,534	49.01%	1,537	49.11%	59	1.88%	0	0.00%	-3	-0.10%	3,130
Greene	3,457	68.63%	1,462	29.03%	118	2.34%	0	0.00%	1,995	39.61%	5,037
Grundy	8,802	77.37%	2,365	20.79%	210	1.85%	0	0.00%	6,437	56.58%	11,377
Hamilton	2,428	68.45%	1,041	29.35%	78	2.20%	0	0.00%	1,387	39.10%	3,547
Hancock	4,883	75.37%	1,485	22.92%	111	1.71%	0	0.00%	3,398	52.45%	6,479
Hardin	1,839	71.72%	680	26.52%	45	1.76%	0	0.00%	1,159	45.20%	2,564
Henderson	2,336	70.11%	943	28.30%	53	1.59%	0	0.00%	1,393	41.81%	3,332
Henry	11,680	71.56%	4,437	27.18%	205	1.26%	0	0.00%	7,243	44.38%	16,322
Iroquois	9,160	81.43%	1,905	16.93%	184	1.64%	0	0.00%	7,255	64.50%	11,249
Jackson	10,251	64.74%	5,204	32.87%	379	2.39%	0	0.00%	5,047	31.87%	15,834
Jasper	2,357	65.64%	1,162	32.36%	72	2.01%	0	0.00%	1,195	33.28%	3,591
Jefferson	7,840	68.38%	3,414	29.77%	212	1.85%	0	0.00%	4,426	38.61%	11,466
Jersey	4,498	64.27%	2,223	31.76%	278	3.97%	0	0.00%	2,275	32.50%	6,999
Jo Daviess	5,293	71.22%	1,985	26.71%	154	2.07%	0	0.00%	3,308	44.51%	7,432
Johnson	3,119	74.12%	977	23.22%	92	2.19%	0	0.00%	2,142	50.90%	4,208
Kane	56,340	74.80%	17,517	23.26%	1,466	1.95%	0	0.00%	38,823	51.54%	75,323
Kankakee	19,282	71.73%	7,148	26.59%	452	1.68%	0	0.00%	12,134	45.14%	26,882
Kendall	9,769	79.77%	2,207	18.02%	270	2.21%	0	0.00%	7,562	61.75%	12,246
Knox	12,935	75.44%	3,964	23.12%	248	1.45%	0	0.00%	8,971	52.32%	17,147
Lake	96,775	73.46%	32,758	24.86%	2,214	1.68%	0	0.00%	64,017	48.60%	131,747
LaSalle	22,685	68.37%	9,725	29.31%	772	2.33%	0	0.00%	12,960	39.06%	33,182
Lawrence	3,561	66.47%	1,707	31.87%	89	1.66%	0	0.00%	1,854	34.60%	5,357
Lee	8,114	74.96%	2,454	22.67%	257	2.37%	0	0.00%	5,660	52.29%	10,825
Livingston	9,782	80.13%	2,267	18.57%	158	1.29%	0	0.00%	7,515	61.56%	12,207
Logan	7,666	76.63%	2,194	21.93%	144	1.44%	0	0.00%	5,472	54.70%	10,004
Macon	22,714	62.20%	13,273	36.35%	530	1.45%	0	0.00%	9,441	25.85%	36,517
Macoupin	9,957	60.47%	6,105	37.08%	403	2.45%	0	0.00%	3,852	23.39%	16,465
Madison	43,806	62.04%	25,008	35.42%	1,794	2.54%	0	0.00%	18,798	26.62%	70,608
Marion	7,734	64.95%	3,918	32.91%	255	2.14%	0	0.00%	3,816	32.04%	11,907
Marshall	3,538	73.43%	1,180	24.49%	100	2.08%	0	0.00%	2,358	48.94%	4,818
Mason	3,546	69.73%	1,463	28.77%	76	1.49%	0	0.00%	2,083	40.97%	5,085
Massac	3,752	78.44%	958	20.03%	73	1.53%	0	0.00%	2,794	58.41%	4,783
McDonough	6,495	70.94%	2,528	27.61%	133	1.45%	0	0.00%	3,967	53.33%	9,156
McHenry	44,414	76.18%	12,596	21.60%	1,292	2.22%	0	0.00%	31,818	54.58%	58,302
McLean	27,216	77.87%	7,144	20.44%	591	1.69%	0	0.00%	20,072	57.43%	34,951
Menard	3,956	72.80%	1,386	25.51%	92	1.69%	0	0.00%	2,570	47.29%	5,434
Mercer	4,550	71.72%	1,695	26.72%	99	1.56%	0	0.00%	2,855	45.00%	6,344
Monroe	5,587	70.11%	2,154	27.03%	228	2.86%	0	0.00%	3,433	43.08%	7,969
Montgomery	6,648	62.26%	3,793	35.52%	236	2.21%	0	0.00%	2,855	26.74%	10,677
Morgan	9,258	74.00%	3,059	24.45%	193	1.54%	0	0.00%	6,199	49.55%	12,510
Moultrie	3,230	68.06%	1,432	30.17%	84	1.77%	0	0.00%	1,798	37.89%	4,746
Ogle	10,285	78.39%	2,444	18.63%	392	2.99%	0	0.00%	7,841	59.76%	13,121
Peoria	36,461	70.09%	14,612	28.09%	945	1.82%	0	0.00%	21,849	42.00%	52,018
Perry	5,856	66.06%	2,820	31.81%	189	2.13%	0	0.00%	3,036	34.25%	8,865
Piatt	4,589	70.37%	1,825	27.99%	107	1.64%	0	0.00%	2,764	42.38%	6,521
Pike	5,199	73.45%	1,737	24.54%	142	2.01%	0	0.00%	3,462	48.91%	7,078
Pope	1,493	75.14%	440	22.14%	54	2.72%	0	0.00%	1,053	53.00%	1,987
Pulaski	2,035	73.12%	712	25.58%	36	1.29%	0	0.00%	1,323	47.54%	2,783
Putnam	1,792	66.35%	850	31.47%	59	2.18%	0	0.00%	942	34.88%	2,701
Randolph	7,391	60.99%	4,455	36.76%	272	2.24%	0	0.00%	2,936	24.23%	12,118
Richland	4,216	73.78%	1,419	24.83%	79	1.38%	0	0.00%	2,797	48.95%	5,714
Rock Island	26,901	64.37%	14,238	34.07%	651	1.56%	0	0.00%	12,663	30.30%	41,790
Saline	6,168	64.89%	3,121	32.84%	216	2.27%	0	0.00%	3,047	32.05%	9,505
Sangamon	52,673	68.13%	23,424	30.30%	1,207	1.56%	3	0.00%	24,249	37.83%	77,307
Schuyler	2,346	71.29%	886	26.92%	59	1.79%	0	0.00%	1,460	44.37%	3,291
Scott	1,771	75.68%	525	22.44%	44	1.88%	0	0.00%	1,246	53.24%	2,340
Shelby	5,452	68.01%	2,405	30.00%	159	1.98%	0	0.00%	3,047	38.01%	8,016
Stark	1,730	76.25%	505	22.26%	34	1.50%	0	0.00%	1,225	53.99%	2,269
St. Clair	38,601	60.84%	23,644	37.27%	1,197	1.89%	0	0.00%	14,957	23.57%	63,442
Stephenson	10,372	76.50%	2,773	20.45%	413	3.05%	0	0.00%	7,599	56.05%	13,558
Tazewell	30,478	72.88%	10,432	24.95%	907	2.17%	0	0.00%	20,046	47.93%	41,817
Union	4,810	71.92%	1,729	25.85%	149	2.23%	0	0.00%	3,081	46.07%	6,688
Vermilion	16,813	72.90%	5,855	25.39%	396	1.72%	0	0.00%	10,958	47.51%	23,064
Wabash	2,837	68.05%	1,259	30.20%	73	1.75%	0	0.00%	1,578	37.85%	4,169
Warren	4,400	77.41%	1,203	21.16%	81	1.43%	0	0.00%	3,197	56.25%	5,684
Washington	4,206	71.71%	1,517	25.87%	142	2.42%	0	0.00%	2,689	45.84%	5,865
Wayne	4,667	70.08%	1,829	27.46%	164	2.46%	0	0.00%	2,838	42.62%	6,660
White	3,679	61.42%	2,191	36.58%	120	2.00%	0	0.00%	1,488	24.84%	5,990
Whiteside	12,179	69.69%	4,995	28.58%	303	1.74%	0	0.00%	7,184	41.11%	17,477
Will	71,871	73.11%	24,635	25.06%	1,799	1.83%	0	0.00%	47,236	48.05%	98,305
Williamson	13,737	69.44%	5,603	28.32%	443	2.24%	0	0.00%	8,134	41.12%	19,783
Winnebago	49,053	71.40%	17,087	24.87%	2,557	3.72%	0	0.00%	31,966	46.53%	68,697
Woodford	9,282	78.31%	2,388	20.15%	183	1.54%	0	0.00%	6,894	58.16%	11,853
Totals	1,984,318	63.88%	1,069,850	34.44%	52,388	1.69	10	0.00%	914,468	29.44%	3,106,556
