= Loleta Didrickson =

American politician (born 1941)

5th Comptroller of Illinois
- In office January 9, 1995 – January 11, 1999
- Governor: Jim Edgar
- Preceded by: Dawn Clark Netsch
- Succeeded by: Daniel Hynes

Director of the Illinois Department of Employment Security
- In office 1991–1994
- Governor: Jim Edgar
- Preceded by: Sally Jackson
- Succeeded by: Lynn Doherty

Member of the Illinois House of Representatives from the 37th district
- In office January 12, 1983 – February 8, 1991
- Preceded by: Jack Dunn
- Succeeded by: Manny Hoffman

Personal details
- Born: May 22, 1941 (age 85) Chicago, Illinois, U.S.
- Party: Republican
- Spouse: Charles Didrickson
- Children: 3
- Education: Governors State University (BA)

Loleta Anderson Didrickson (born May 22, 1941) is the 5th Illinois Comptroller, serving from 1995 to 1999.

== Early life and education ==
Didrickson was born on May 22, 1941 in Chicago. She attended public schools and completed three years of study at the University of Illinois before marrying her husband, Charles "Charlie" Didrickson, and raising three children. She later completed a Bachelor of Arts degree, with a major in communications, at Governors State University.

== Career ==
Didrickson was elected comptroller in 1994, succeeding Democrat Dawn Netsch, who was the Democratic nominee for governor. Her Democratic opponent was State Senator Earlean Collins. Before being elected comptroller, Didrickson served for three years, under Governor Jim Edgar, as the Director of the Illinois Department of Employment Security. She had served eight years in the Illinois House of Representatives.

In 1998, Didrickson was a candidate for the United States Senate. She was strongly supported in this bid by Governor Edgar and former Republican presidential nominee Bob Dole. The latter was her national campaign chairman. In a heated primary, however, she was defeated by a more conservative candidate, State Senator Peter Fitzgerald. He went on that year to defeat incumbent Senator Carol Moseley-Braun. Didrickson was succeeded as comptroller by Democrat Dan Hynes.

Party political offices
Preceded by Sue Suter	Republican nominee for Illinois Comptroller; 1994	Succeeded by Chris Lauzen
Political offices
Preceded by Dawn Clark Netsch	Illinois Comptroller; 9 January 1995– 11 January 1999	Succeeded by Daniel Hynes
