= Prevarication =

Prevarication is avoidance of the truth. Prevarication can include, or be part of:

- Deception
- Evasion (ethics)
- Waffle (speech)
