= Dawn Clark Netsch =

American politician

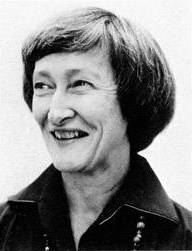
- Netsch in 1981

4th Comptroller of Illinois
- In office January 14, 1991 – January 9, 1995
- Governor: Jim Edgar
- Preceded by: Roland Burris
- Succeeded by: Loleta Didrickson

Member of the Illinois Senate
- In office January 10, 1973 – January 14, 1991
- Preceded by: redistricting
- Succeeded by: John Cullerton
- Constituency: 13th district (1973–1983); 4th district (1983–1991)

Personal details
- Born: Patricia Dawn Clark; September 16, 1926 Cincinnati, Ohio, U.S.
- Died: March 5, 2013 (aged 86) Chicago, Illinois, U.S.
- Party: Democratic
- Spouse: Walter Netsch
- Education: Northwestern University (BA, JD)

Dawn Clark Netsch (born Patricia Dawn Clark; September 16, 1926 – March 5, 2013) was an American politician and Northwestern University law professor. A member of the Democratic Party, she served in the Illinois State Senate from 1973 to 1991, and as the Illinois Comptroller from 1991 through 1995. In 1994, she was the first woman to be nominated by a major political party to run for Governor of Illinois. In addition to being a professor, she co-authored the legal textbook State and Local Government in a Federal System.

== Early career ==
She was born Patricia Dawn Clark in Cincinnati, Ohio. Her father, William Keith Clark, was a manufacturer of building materials until his business failed during the Great Depression. Her mother, Hazel Dawn Clark (née Harrison), was a social worker. Netsch graduated Phi Beta Kappa from Northwestern University in 1948. She was selected for membership in Mortar Board National College Senior Honor Society in her junior year. She then attended the university's law school, where she was the first woman to earn the school's Scholar’s Cup for the highest grade-point average in the first-year class. When Netsch graduated in 1952 she was the only woman in her class. When she joined the Northwestern Law faculty in 1965, she was the school’s first female faculty member.

She worked on Adlai Stevenson's 1952 presidential campaign and then at the Washington, D.C. law firm of Covington & Burling. Returning to Chicago, she was in private practice from 1957 to 1961 and then joined the staff of Gov. Otto Kerner.

In 1969, she was elected to serve as a delegate to the 1969–70 Illinois Constitutional Convention, at which the fourth and current Constitution of Illinois was drafted.

== Illinois State Senator ==
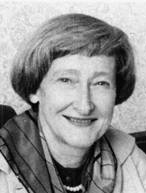
Official portrait, c. 1987

In 1972, she was elected to the State Senate as a Democrat, first representing the 13th district, then the 4th district. In 1974, she hired Glynn Sudbery as her campaign manager. Sudbery, who was openly gay, helped inspire her efforts to secure state funding for victims of the AIDS crisis.

For a decade, she was the chair of the Senate Revenue Committee.

== Illinois Comptroller ==
In 1990, she ran for and won the Democratic party's nomination for Illinois Comptroller and went on to win the general election, beating Republican Sue Suter 54% to 46%.

== Gubernatorial race ==
Four years later, in 1994, she won an upset victory in the Democratic primary for Illinois governor, beating Illinois Attorney General Roland Burris and Cook County Board President Richard Phelan, winning by more than 10 points ahead of Burris (who was the favorite). Netsch had been behind in the polls a few weeks earlier. During the primary, she aired a campaign ad showing her playing (and winning) a game of eight-ball pool, reflecting a lifelong hobby of hers and also playing on her reputation as a "straight shooter." The effectiveness of this ad, in contrast to the far more flashy ones aired by her much better funded opponents, was seen as contributing to her surge in the polls in the final weeks of the primary campaign. Adding to the historic nature of her candidacy was her pairing with Illinois State Senator Penny Severns of Decatur as her Lt. Governor candidate on the gubernatorial ticket. This was, and remains, the only time in Illinois history two women have headed the party ticket.

Netsch used humor to address the fact that she was twenty years older than her Republican opponent, Governor Jim Edgar, with her campaign using the slogan, "Not just another pretty face." She proposed increasing the state income tax rate from 3% to 4.25% to pay for educational funding and reduce property taxes, a plan which Edgar attacked. Netsch, a social liberal who lacked strong support of the Cook County Democratic Party, was unable to overcome Edgar's popularity in a year when the Republican party was successful nationally, and received only 34% of the vote.

== Later career ==
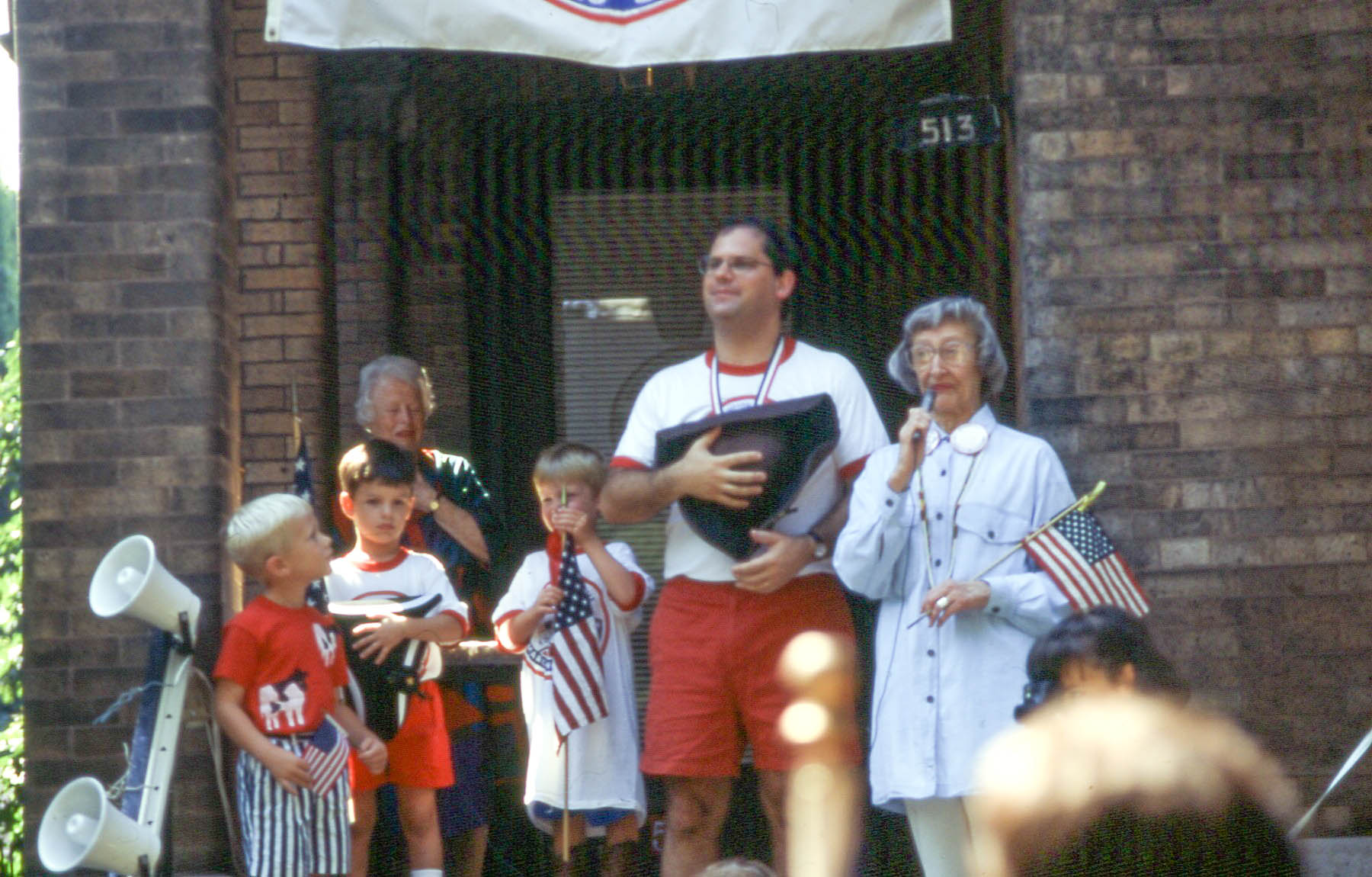
Nestch (right) speaking at a 1995 parade

In 1995 Netsch was inducted into the Chicago Gay and Lesbian Hall of Fame as a Friend of the Community for her support of issues of importance to the LGBT community. She participated for years in Chicago's Gay Pride parade, riding in a convertible bearing a sign that read, "I'm Not Running for Anything."

Netsch was a professor of law, and then professor emeritus, at Northwestern University School of Law. She was a prominent opponent of holding a new constitutional convention in Illinois. She co-authored with Daniel Mandelker and Peter Salsich Jr. State and Local Government in a Federal System, the preeminent law school casebook on local and state government law.

Netsch remained involved in politics after her electoral career by backing candidates for elected office, such as Jan Schakowsky's winning bid to replace Congressman Sidney Yates, representing Illinois's 9th congressional district, in 1996, and John Schmidt's failed gubernatorial bid in 2002. In 2010, Netsch endorsed Dan Hynes in the Democratic primary for Illinois Governor, Julie Hamos in the 10th congressional district primary, David H. Hoffman in the US Senate primary and Toni Preckwinkle in the Cook County Board President primary. All but Preckwinkle failed to win the party's nomination.

Netsch was married to architect Walter Netsch, best known for his design of the Cadet Chapel at the U.S. Air Force Academy in Colorado Springs, for 45 years until his death in 2008.

In January 2013, Netsch announced that she had been diagnosed with ALS. She died at her home in Chicago on March 5, 2013, at the age of 86. Governor Pat Quinn gave the order to fly all Illinois flags at half-mast until sunset, March 16, 2013, in her honor.

== Awards ==
Dawn Clark Netsch was inducted as a Laureate of The Lincoln Academy of Illinois and awarded the Order of Lincoln (the State’s highest honor) by the Governor of Illinois in 2011 in the area of Government & Law.

Political offices
Preceded by Roland Burris	Comptroller of Illinois; 1991–1995	Succeeded by Loleta Didrickson
Party political offices
Preceded by Roland Burris	Democratic nominee for Illinois Comptroller; 1990	Succeeded by Earlean Collins
Preceded by Neil Hartigan	Democratic nominee for Governor of Illinois; 1994	Succeeded by Glenn Poshard
