= 1994 Illinois elections =

- November 8, 1994
- Turnout: 52.61%

Elections were held in Illinois on Tuesday, November 8, 1994. Primaries were held on March 15, 1994.

These elections saw the Republican Party make significant gains, and conversely saw the Democratic Party see significant losses. The Republican Party captured the State House and retained control of the State Senate and, winning them a trifecta of state government control. The Republican Party additionally won all statewide executive offices, retaining the governorship and office of lieutenant governor in their combined election, retaining the office of Secretary of State, while also flipping the offices of Attorney General, Comptroller, and Treasurer. The Republican Party also gained two more of Illinois' U.S. congressional seats.

The result of the election marked the first time since the 1950s that all executive offices and control of the Illinois General Assembly were held by a single party (the previous time had also seen the Republican Party reach this feat).

== Election information ==
1994 was a midterm election year in the United States. The 1994 midterm elections saw a strong national showing by the Republican Party, which was dubbed the Republican Revolution.

=== Turnout ===
For the primaries, turnout was 31.91%, with 1,963,606 ballots cast (with 1,186,888 Democratic ballots, 729,372 Republican ballots, 674 Harold Washington, and 46,619 nonpartisan ballots cast).

For the general election, turnout was 52.61%, with 3,219,122 ballots cast.

=== Straight-ticket voting ===
Illinois had a straight-ticket voting option in 1994.

Party	Number of straight-ticket votes
Democratic	407,858
Republican	587,670
Libertarian	2,343
United Independents Party	654

== Federal elections ==
=== United States House ===
All Illinois seats in the United States House of Representatives were up for election in 1994.

The Republican Party flipped two seats from the Democratic Party. Among the two Democrats unseated by Republicans was Ways and Means Chairman Dan Rostenkowski, who had been in congress since 1959. This left the party composition of Illinois' House delegation 10 Democrats and 10 Republicans.

== State elections ==
=== Governor and Lieutenant Governor ===
1994 Illinois gubernatorial election
- November 8, 1994
- Turnout: 50.77%
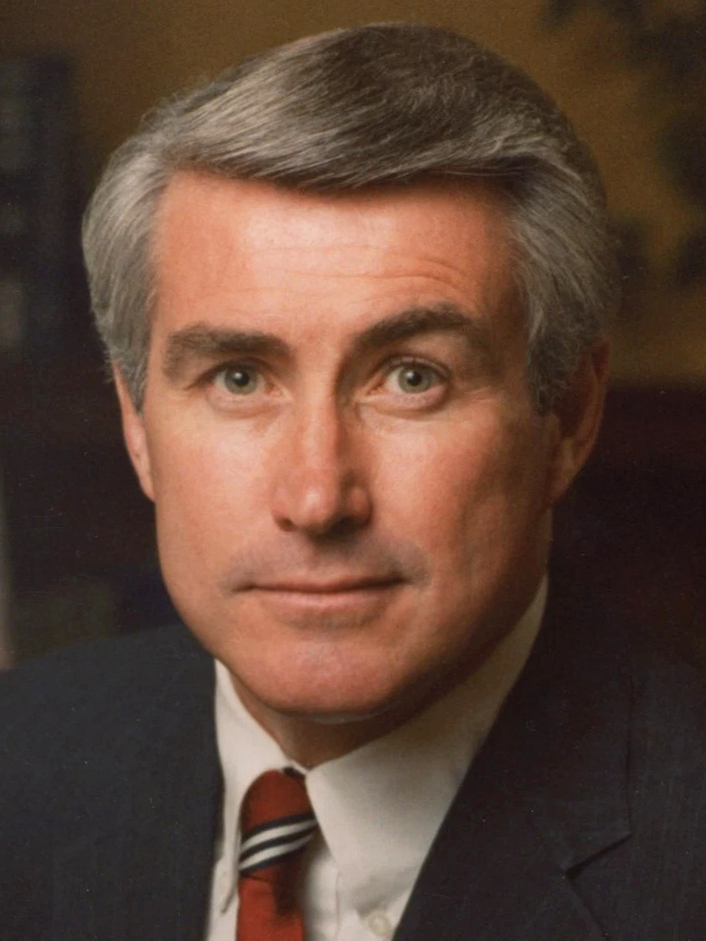

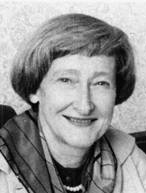
Nominee	Jim Edgar	Dawn Clark Netsch
Party	Republican	Democratic
Running mate	Bob Kustra	Penny Severns
Popular vote	1,984,318	1,069,850
Percentage	63.9%	34.4%
- County results Edgar: 50-60% 60-70% 70-80% 80-90% Netsch: 40–50%
Governor before election
Jim Edgar
Republican
Elected Governor
Jim Edgar
Republican

Incumbent Governor Jim Edgar, a Republican, won reelection in the greatest landslide in Illinois history, excepting the election of 1818. Edgar carried 101 of the state's 102 counties over the Democratic nominee, State Comptroller Dawn Clark Netsch, with Netsch only winning Gallatin County. To date, this is the most recent statewide election in which Cook County voted for the Republican candidate.

Gubernatorial election
Party	Candidate	Votes	%
Republican	Jim Edgar (incumbent) / Bob Kustra (incumbent)	1,984,318	63.9
Democratic	Dawn Clark Netsch / Penny Severns	1,069,850	34.4
Libertarian	David L. Kelley	52,388	1.69
Write-in		10	0.0
Total votes		3,106,556	100

=== Attorney General ===
1994 Illinois Attorney General election
- November 8, 1994
- Turnout: 50.34%
Nominee	Jim Ryan	Al Hofeld
Party	Republican	Democratic
Popular vote	1,651,976	1,371,295
Percentage	53.63%	44.52%
- County results Ryan: 40–50% 50–60% 60–70% 70–80% Hofeld: 40–50% 50–60%
Attorney General before election
Roland Burris
Democratic
Elected Attorney General
Jim Ryan
Republican

Incumbent Attorney General Roland Burris, a Democrat, did not run for a second term, instead opting (ultimately unsuccessfully) to seek the Democratic nomination for governor. Republican Jim Ryan was elected to succeed him in office.

==== Democratic primary ====
Attorney and 1992 U.S. Senate candidate Al Hofeld won the Democratic primary, defeating former Chicago alderman Martin J. Oberman.

Attorney General Democratic primary
Party	Candidate	Votes	%
Democratic	Al Hofeld	573,033	57.70
Democratic	Martin J. Oberman	420,019	42.30
Total votes		993,052	100

==== Republican primary ====
DuPage County state's attorney Jim Ryan won the Republican primary, defeating Metra Chairman Jeffrey Ladd and attorney Themis Anagost. Ryan had been the unsuccessful Republican nominee for attorney general in 1990.

Attorney General Republican primary
Party	Candidate	Votes	%
Republican	Jim Ryan	471,068	71.64
Republican	Jeff Ladd	176,002	26.77
Republican	Themis Anagost	10,482	1.59
Total votes		657,552	100

==== General election ====
Attorney General election
Party	Candidate	Votes	%
Republican	Jim Ryan	1,651,976	53.63
Democratic	Albert F. Hofeld	1,371,295	44.52
Libertarian	Natalie Loder Clark	57,104	1.85
Total votes		3,080,375	100

=== Secretary of State ===
1994 Illinois Secretary of State election
- November 8, 1994
- Turnout: 50.48%
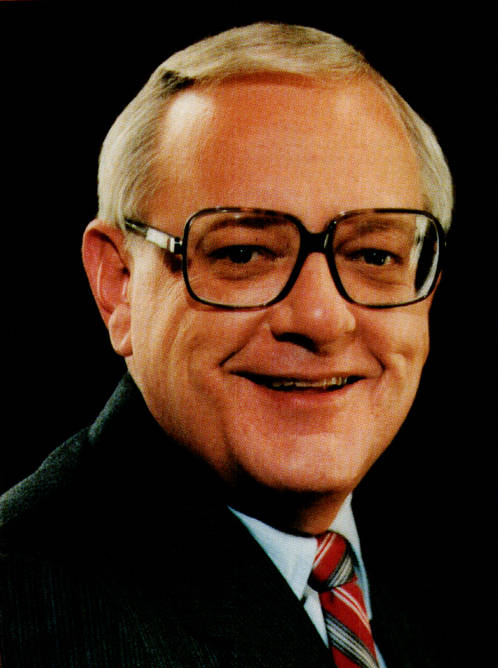

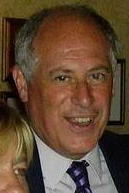
Nominee	George Ryan	Pat Quinn
Party	Republican	Democratic
Popular vote	1,868,144	1,182,629
Percentage	60.48%	38.29%
- County results Ryan: 50–60% 60–70% 70–80% Quinn: 40–50% 50–60%
Secretary of State before election
George Ryan
Republican
Elected Secretary of State
George Ryan
Republican

Incumbent Secretary of State George Ryan was reelected to a second term. As of 2022, this is the last time a Republican was elected Illinois Secretary of State.

==== Democratic primary ====
Treasurer of Illinois Pat Quinn won the Democratic primary, defeating Illinois State Senator Denny Jacobs and LaRouche movement member Rose-Marie Love.

Originally, Kane County Coroner Mary Lou Kearns had also declared herself a candidate for the Democratic nomination for Secretary of State, but she subsequently decided to instead run for Comptroller.

Secretary of State Democratic primary
Party	Candidate	Votes	%
Democratic	Pat Quinn	641,787	70.54
Democratic	Denny Jacobs	141,058	15.51
Democratic	Rose-Marie Love	126,939	13.95
Total votes		909,784	100

==== Republican primary ====
Incumbent George Ryan ran unopposed in the Republican primary.

Secretary of State Republican primary
Party	Candidate	Votes	%
Republican	George H. Ryan (incumbent)	621,196	100
Total votes		621,196	100

==== General election ====
Secretary of State election
Party	Candidate	Votes	%
Republican	George H. Ryan (incumbent)	1,868,144	60.48
Democratic	Pat Quinn	1,182,629	38.29
Libertarian	Joseph Schreiner	38,074	1.23
Total votes		3,088,847	100

=== Comptroller ===
1994 Illinois State Comptroller election
- November 8, 1994
- Turnout: 47.99%

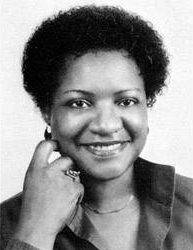
Nominee	Loleta Didrickson	Earlean Collins
Party	Republican	Democratic
Popular vote	1,615,122	1,208,128
Percentage	55.00%	41.14%
- County results Didrickson: 40–50% 50–60% 60–70% 70–80% Collins: 40–50% 50–60% 60–70%
State Comptroller before election
Dawn Clark Netsch
Democratic
Elected State Comptroller
Loleta Didrickson
Republican

Incumbent Comptroller Dawn Clark Netsch, a Democrat, did not seek reelection to a second term, instead opting to run for governor. Republican Loleta Didrickson was elected to succeed her in office.

==== Democratic primary ====
Illinois State Senator Earlean Collins defeated Kane County Coroner/Kane County Democratic Party Chairwoman Mary Lou Kearns, Lyons Township Assessor Edward J. Schumann, and LaRouche movement member Mark Bender.

Comptroller Democratic primary
Party	Candidate	Votes	%
Democratic	Earlean Collins	320,718	36.15
Democratic	Mary Lou Kearns	311,088	35.06
Democratic	Edward J. Schumann	161,733	18.23
Democratic	Mark P. Bender	93,676	10.56
Total votes		887,215	100

==== Republican primary ====
Comptroller Republican primary
Party	Candidate	Votes	%
Republican	Loleta A. Didrickson	537,642	100
Total votes		537,642	100

=== General election ===
Comptroller election
Party	Candidate	Votes	%
Republican	Loleta A. Didrickson	1,615,122	55.00
Democratic	Earlean Collins	1,208,128	41.14
Libertarian	Michael J. Ginsberg	113,071	3.85
Total votes		2,936,321	100

=== Treasurer ===
1994 Illinois State Treasurer election
- November 8, 1994
- Turnout: 48.78%
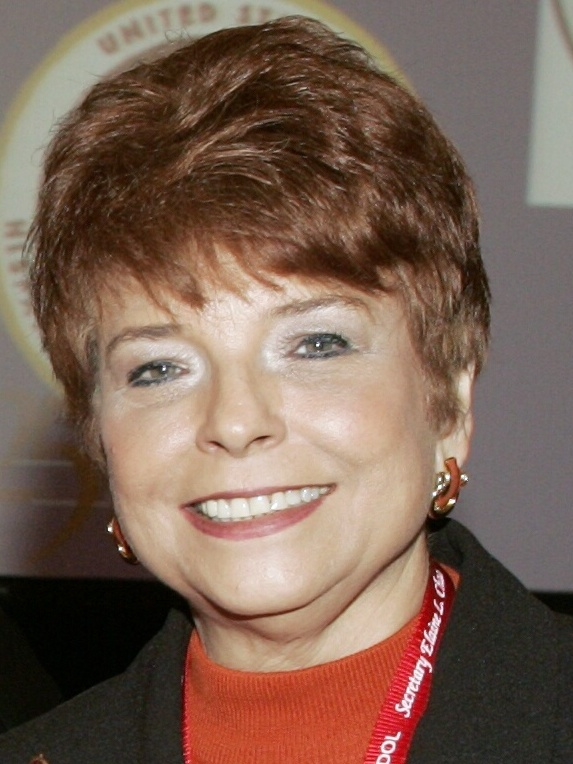

Nominee	Judy Baar Topinka	Nancy Drew Sheehan
Party	Republican	Democratic
Popular vote	1,504,335	1,427,317
Percentage	50.40%	47.82%
- County results Topinka: 40–50% 50–60% 60–70% 70–80% Sheehan: 40–50% 50–60% 60–70%
Treasurer before election
Pat Quinn
Democratic
Elected Treasurer
Judy Baar Topinka
Republican

Incumbent Treasurer Pat Quinn, a Democrat, did not run for a second term, instead opting to run for Secretary of State. Republican Judy Baar Topinka was elected to succeed him in office.

==== Democratic primary ====
Metropolitan Water Reclamation District board member Nancy Drew Sheehan defeated Thomas J. Beaudette in the Democratic primary.

Treasurer Democratic primary
Party	Candidate	Votes	%
Democratic	Nancy Drew Sheehan	711,865	84.07
Democratic	Thomas J. Beaudette	134,873	15.93
Total votes		846,738	100

==== Republican primary ====
Illinois State Senator Judy Baar Topinka won the Republican primary, running unopposed.

Treasurer Republican primary
Party	Candidate	Votes	%
Republican	Judy Baar Topinka	543,235	100
Total votes		543,235	100

==== General election ====
Treasurer election
Party	Candidate	Votes	%
Republican	Judy Baar Topinka	1,504,335	50.40
Democratic	Nancy Drew Sheehan	1,427,317	47.82
Libertarian	Kati L. Kroenlein	53,108	1.78
Total votes		2,984,760	100

=== State Senate ===
1994 Illinois Senate election
- November 8, 1994

21 of 59 seats in the Illinois Senate 30 seats needed for a majority
	Majority party	Minority party
Party	Republican	Democratic
Last election	32	27
Seats won	33	26
Seat change	▲1	▼1
- Results: Republican gain Republican hold Democratic hold No election
President before election
James Philip
Republican
Elected President
James Philip
Republican

21 out of 59 seats in the Illinois Senate were up for election in 1994. Republicans retained control of the Illinois Senate, which they had captured a majority in during the preceding 1992 elections.

=== State House of Representatives ===
1994 Illinois House of Representatives election
- November 8, 1994

All 118 seats in the Illinois House of Representatives 60 seats needed for a majority
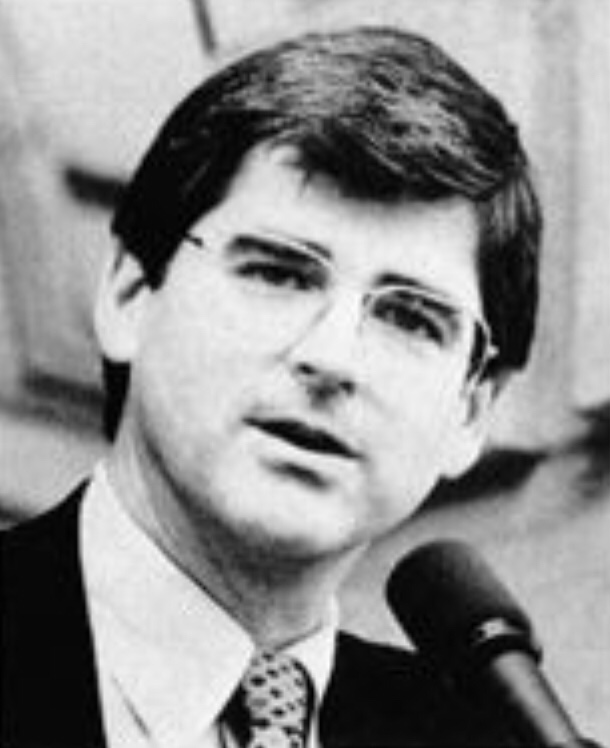

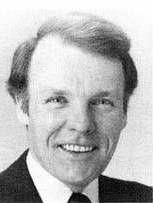
	Majority party	Minority party
Leader	Lee Daniels	Michael Madigan
Party	Republican	Democratic
Leader's seat	46th	22nd
Last election	51	67
Seats won	64	54
Seat change	▲13	▼13
- Results: Republican gain Republican hold Democratic hold
Speaker before election
Michael Madigan
Democratic
Speaker-Elect
Lee Daniels
Republican

All of the seats in the Illinois House of Representatives were up for election in 1994. Republicans flipped control of the Illinois House of Representatives.

=== Trustees of the University of Illinois ===
1994 Trustees of the University of Illinois election
- November 8, 1994

An election was held for three of nine seats for Trustees of the University of Illinois system for six-year terms.

This was the last election for Trustees of University of Illinois, as this would subsequently become an appointed office.

The election saw the reelection of incumbent Republican Judith Reese to a second term, as well as the election of new trustees Republican Bill Engelbrecht and Democrat Martha R. O'Malley.

First-term incumbent Democrat Ken Boyle lost reelection. First-term incumbent Republican Donald W. Grabowski was not nominated for reelection.

Trustees of the University of Illinois election
Party	Candidate	Votes	%
Republican	Judith Reese (incumbent)	1,432,013	17.55
Republican	William D. "Bill" Engelbrecht	1,330,511	16.31
Democratic	Martha R. O'Malley	1,312,075	16.08
Democratic	Ken Boyle (incumbent)	1,305,334	16.00
Republican	Brian C. Silverman	1,240,397	15.20
Democratic	Ross Harano	1,088,218	13.34
Libertarian	Robin J. Miller	196,068	2.40
Libertarian	Joni Garcia Rubio	148,395	1.82
Libertarian	Kirby R. Cundiff	105,994	1.30
Write-in	Robin Kessinger	4	0.00
Total votes		8,159,009	100

=== Judicial elections ===
Multiple judicial positions were up for election in 1994.

=== Ballot measures ===
Illinois voters voted on a two ballot measures in 1994, both of them legislatively referred constitutional amendment In order to be approved, the measures required either 60% support among those specifically voting on the amendment or 50% support among all ballots cast in the elections.

==== Illinois Criminal Defendants' Right to Meet Witnesses Amendment ====
Voters approved the Illinois Criminal Defendants' Right to Meet Witnesses Amendment (also known as "Amendment 1"), a legislatively referred constitutional amendment which amended Article I, Section 8 of the Constitution of Illinois, which allowed criminal defendants be given the right to be confronted by witnesses.

Illinois Criminal Defendants' Right to Meet Witnesses Amendment
Option	Votes	% of votes on measure	% of all ballots cast
Yes	1,525,525	62.73	47.39
No	906,383	37.27	28.16
Total votes	2,431,908	100	75.55
Voter turnout	39.74%		

Amendment results by county Yes: 60–70%; 50–60%; No: 50–60%

==== Illinois Legislative Session Length Amendment ====
Voters approved Illinois Legislative Session Length (also known as "Amendment 2"), a legislatively referred constitutional amendment which amended Article IV, Section 10 of the Constitution of Illinois to change the legislative adjournment date from June 20 to May 3.

Illinois Legislative Session Length Amendment
Option	Votes	% of votes on measure	% of all ballots cast
Yes	1,476,615	68.87	45.87
No	667,585	31.14	20.74
Total votes	2,144,200	100	66.61
Voter turnout	35.04%		

Amendment results by county Yes: 70–80%; 60–70%; 50–60%

== Local elections ==
Local elections were held. These included county elections, such as the Cook County elections.
