= Roeser (surname) =

Roeser is a surname. Notable people with the surname include:

- Andy Roeser (born 1959), American basketball executive
- Donald Roeser (born 1947), American guitarist, singer, songwriter and founding member of Blue Öyster Cult
- Jack Roeser (1923–2014), American engineer, inventor, entrepreneur, businessman and civic leader
- Nic Roeser (1896–1997), Luxembourgian gymnast
- Tom Roeser (1928–2011), American writer and broadcaster
