= George Dunne =

American politician (1913–2006)

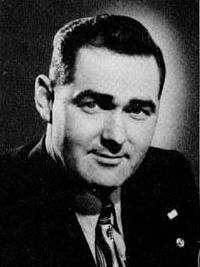
- official portrait, circa 1961

President of the Cook County Board of Commissioners
- In office January 1969 – December 1990
- Preceded by: Richard B. Ogilvie
- Succeeded by: Richard Phelan

Chair of the Cook County Democratic Party
- In office 1987–1990
- Preceded by: Edward Vrdolyak
- Succeeded by: Thomas G. Lyons
- In office 1976–1982
- Preceded by: Richard J. Daley
- Succeeded by: Edward Vrdolyak

Member of the Cook County Board of Commissioners
- In office 1963–1990
- Constituency: Member from Chicago

Member of the Illinois House of Representatives
- In office 1955–1963

Personal details
- Born: February 20, 1913 Chicago, Illinois, U.S.
- Died: May 28, 2006 (aged 93) Hebron, Illinois, U.S.
- Party: Democratic
- Spouse: Claudia Grimaldi
- Children: 3, including Murphy
- Education: Northwestern University

Military service
- Allegiance: United States
- Branch/service: United States Air Force
- Years of service: 1941–1945 (active); 1951–1953 (reserve)
- Unit: 126th Fighter-Bomber Wing (active); Illinois Air National Guard (reserve)

George W. Dunne (February 20, 1913 – May 28, 2006) was an American politician within the Democratic Party from Chicago, Illinois. He was president of the Cook County Board of Commissioners from 1969 to 1991; the longest service of anyone holding that office.

== Early life ==
He was born in the Near North Side of Chicago, one of eight children of John and Ellen Dunne. His father died when he was twelve years old. He graduated from De La Salle Institute and attended Northwestern University for a year but dropped out. He became active in Democratic politics and was employed by the Park District, an agency in which many Democratic precinct captains were given patronage jobs. During World War II and the Korean War he served overseas as a member of the Illinois Air National Guard's 126th Fighter-Bomber Wing.

== Political career ==
He was appointed to a vacant seat in the Illinois House of Representatives in 1955, and was re-elected in 1956, 1958, 1960, and 1962. After eight years he became floor leader for the House Democrats.

In 1963, Chicago Mayor Richard J. Daley appointed him to a seat on the Cook County Board of Commissioners.

== Cook County Board presidency and stints as Cook County Democratic Party chairman ==
In 1969, Dunne became President of the Cook County Board of Commissioners, succeeding Richard B. Ogilvie, who had been elected Governor. Despite periodic revelations of questionable financial dealings, of which he was continuously cleared (Dunne owned and operated an insurance agency throughout his career in elected office), Dunne was re-elected in 1970, 1974, 1978, 1982, and 1986. He was also seen as a potential successor to mayor Daley.

After Daley's death in December 1976, Dunne succeeded him as chairman of the Cook County Democratic Committee. He was elected by a 79–1 vote of the committee, defeating a vigorous effort by Ed Kelly (47th ward committeeman and superintendent of the Chicago Park District) to secure the position for himself. After becoming county party chairman, his first action was to dismiss Jane Byrne as a co-chair and to disband the county's Democratic Women's Group. Byrne would later reflect in her memoirs that she believed that, "Dunne obviously cared little for women politicians." In 1982, Dunne lost the party chairmanship to alderman Edward Vrdolyak, an ally of Byrne (who had been elected mayor of Chicago in 1979.

During the "Council Wars" of the 1980s, Dunne aligned himself with Harold Washington (Chicago's first African-American mayor). Dunne was one of the few members of the Cook County Democratic Party political machine to side with Washington. After Vrdolyak lost his attempt to unseat Washington in the 1987 mayoral election, Vrdolyak resigned the county party chairmanship. After Vrdolyak's resignation, Dunne was returned to the chairmanship. After Washington's death in office later that year, Dunne played an important role in securing Eugene Sawyer's appointment as mayor by the city council.

Approaching the age of 80, and enmeshed in a scandal in which he admitted having sex with female county employees (The Chicago Tribune printed a correction that these women were not pressured into providing sexual favors to him,) Dunne decided to retire in 1990, and did not seek re-election to the County Board presidency or party chairmanship. However, he stayed on as Democratic ward committeeman of Chicago's 42nd Ward, a post he had held since 1961. Dunne was repeatedly re-elected to this position until he resigned in 2003.

== Death and legacy ==
Dunne died on May 28, 2006 on his farm in Hebron, Illinois. The Cook County Administration Building at 69 West Washington Street (originally the headquarters of the Brunswick Corporation) was renamed in his honor and bears his portrait in the lobby. On June 1, 2006, there was a funeral mass at Holy Name Cathedral, followed by entombment All Saints Mausoleum.There is a golf course located in the southwest suburbs of Chicago named George W. Dunne National Golf Course. Located in Oak Forest, it is a premier 18-hole course. Consisting of unique features of bent grass fairways and greens. Eight lakes come into play on eleven of the courses holes. Surrounded by Cook County Forest Preserve there is always an abundance of wildlife and feeling of tranquility.

His son George became an actor and musician under the name Murphy Dunne, appearing in the Chicago-based Blues Brothers movies.

Preceded by Richard B. Ogilvie	Cook County Board President; 1969–1990	Succeeded by Richard Phelan
