= Illinois pension crisis =

State of pension system

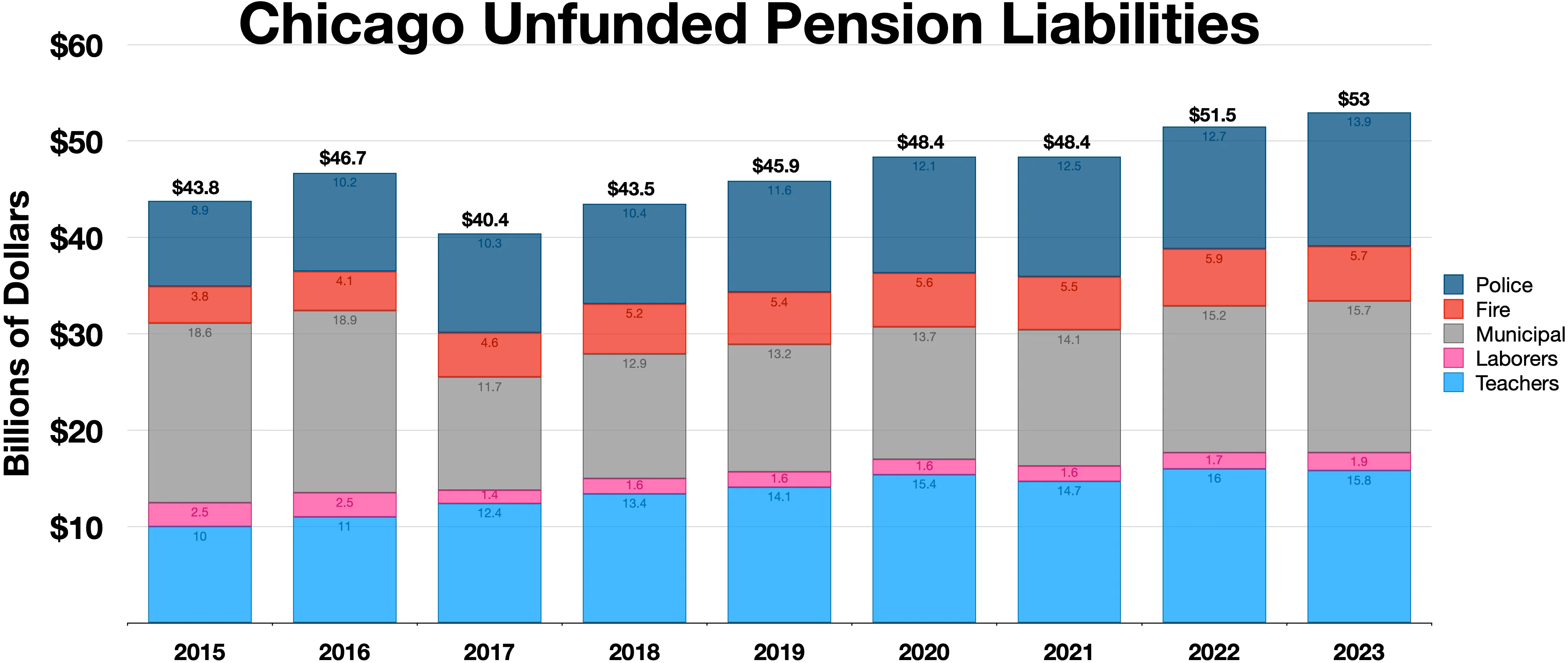
Chicago and Chicago Public Schools unfunded pension liabilities

The Illinois pension crisis refers to the rising gap between the pension benefits owed to eligible state employees and the amount of funding set aside by the state to make these future pension payments. As of 2020, the size of Illinois' pension obligation is $237B, but the state's pension funds have only $96B available for payouts to retirees.

Illinois has the second highest unfunded pension ratio, after New Jersey. Illinois state budget contributions have fallen short of the increases in pension liabilities for 12 of the past 15 years, resulting in a three-fold increase in the funding gap.

Illinois' pension obligations are made up of five pension plans for public sector employees. The plans, and their respective size and funding level, include:

State Pension Plan	Total Membership	Total Liability ($M)	Funding ratio
Teachers' Retirement System (TRS)	406,855	$122,904	40%
State Employees Retirement System (SERS)	87,437	$46,701	36%
State University Retirement System (SURS)	230,364	$41,853	44%
Judges' Retirement System (JRS)	972	$2,649	36%
General Assembly Retirement System (GARS)	470	$371	15%

== History ==
Dating as far back as 1917, reports by the Illinois legislature described the condition of the state and municipal pension systems as "one of insolvency" and "moving toward crisis". Such findings continued in the 1940s to 1960s, when the state pension commission warned of the pension systems' impending insolvency and the growth of unfunded pension liabilities, noting the appropriations were "grossly insufficient" and "below mandatory statutory requirements."

Throughout the 1970s, the funding of the state's pension systems rose from roughly 35% to 50%. From the 1980s to the mid-1990s, pension funding levels fluctuated between 50% and 60%.

=== 1994 pension reform ===
In 1994, when unfunded pension liabilities hit a then-high of $17B, new legislation was passed under governor Jim Edgar to raise the funding ratio from 52% to 90% by 2045, referred to as the 'Edgar Ramp'. However, a later complaint by the Securities and Exchange Commission noted even at the levels proposed by the reform package, unfunded pension liabilities would continue to grow. While the state's pension funding ratio increased to 75% by 2000, the funding improvements were driven by $15B of favorable changes to actuarial assumptions and better-than-expected investment returns, and state contributions fell $6B short of required amounts.

=== 2000–2001: the dot-com crash ===
From 2001 to 2003, following the dot-com crash, poor investment returns contributed to an increase in unfunded liabilities, representing $14B of the $27B rise. By 2003, the unfunded liability reached $43.1B. In 2003, the state sold $10 billion in pension obligation bonds used to reduce unfunded liabilities for fiscal year 2003 ($2.2B) and 2004 ($7.3B).

=== 2005 reform amendment ===
In 2005, Senate Bill 27 allowed for reduced contributions in times of budgetary pressure, known as 'pension holidays'. In 2006 and 2007, contributions were roughly $1B lower than the amounts required under the 1995 legislation.

=== 2008 financial crisis ===
Poor investment returns caused by the 2008 financial crisis, combined with insufficient contributions, increased the unfunded liability from $42B in 2007 to $86B in 2010. In 2009, Governor Pat Quinn included pension reforms for newly-hired public employees, including a higher retirement age and capped cost-of-living adjustment rate, but the proposed changes were not enacted by lawmakers.

=== 2013 pension reform and supreme court repeal ===
In 2013, Illinois passed a pension reform bill which reduced retiree cost of living increases, raised retirement ages, limited pensionable salary, lowered the amounts current employees contribute, set up voluntary 401(k)s and guaranteed the state makes contributions on time. Legislators estimated the reform would save roughly $160 billion over three decades. In May 2015, the Illinois Supreme Court unanimously overturned the law on the grounds that it violated the benefit protection clause in the Illinois Constitution (Article XIII, Section V) which states "Membership in any pension or retirement system of the State, any unit of local government or school district, or any agency or instrumentality thereof, shall be an enforceable contractual relationship, the benefits of which shall not be diminished or impaired."

== Reform debate ==
Pension funding levels are determined by the contributions made in the state budget to fund pension liabilities, and the scale and formula of pension benefits offered to state employees. Additionally, actuarial assumptions used in the calculation of future pension payments and the financial performance of the pension fund asset investments affect the annual valuation of pension liabilities.

Illinois' General Assembly, Governor, lobbyists and unions disagree over what combination of reforms should be made to reduce the existing funding gap. The debate has centered around two mechanisms:

- Increasing state budget contributions toward pension liabilities (such as tax increases, new state revenue streams, spending cuts); and/or
- Changing benefit calculations and criteria (such as reducing 3% automatic annual cost-of-living increase in pension payments signed into law by James Thompson, limiting the impact of salary increases on benefit calculations, increasing the retirement age, increasing employee contributions)

A parallel debate exists on whether and how to restrict defined-benefit pension plans to new state employees to reduce future pension obligations.

A new model for reform referred to as the "Consideration model", first advocated by Illinois Senate President John Cullerton in 2012, has been discussed in the General Assembly. Based on the legal concept of consideration, pension plan members would be offered options to choose from to opt-in to lesser benefits, and the new agreement would represent a modification to the original contract. Former Governor Bruce Rauner's 2019 budget included a proposed consideration model reform stated to bring $900M in savings.
