= Illinois Department of Children and Family Services =

U.S. state government agency

Department of Children and Family Services
Department overview
- Jurisdiction: Illinois
- Department executive: Marc Smith, Director of Children and Family Services
- Website: www.dcfs.illinois.gov

The Illinois Department of Children and Family Services (DCFS) is the code department of the Illinois state government responsible for child protective services. As of June 2019, Marc Smith is the acting Director of Children and Family Services.

The DCFS Office of the Inspector General (OIG) reports to the Governor and General Assembly annually regarding DCFS. This report reviews deaths and serious injuries that occurred to children who were in DCFS custody or whose families had DCFS involvement the year prior to the child's death or injury. The report also includes policy and disciplinary recommendations by the OIG which are occasionally rejected in the publication by DCFS. The January 2016 edition reviews 96 children's deaths and opens with an introduction from the Inspector General, Denise Kane:

"This year’s annual report sadly captured our failures to our child welfare children and families. There are times when citizens, State agencies and our governmental leaders must have a collective conscience to remedy our social failings. When State agencies use an assessment tool that has never been validated on the very young to psychiatrically hospitalize three and four year-old children, shame on us. When a four-year-old comes into state custody with the developmental speech of a two-year-old, and we only afford him 15 minutes of speech therapy once a week, shame on us. When a ward is gunned down in the streets by an officer whose duty is to protect and there is no integrity to those reporting the incident, shame on us as a society. When our State’s Public Health and Mental Health systems become so eviscerated that vulnerable families have to face child protection investigations without prevention services, shame on us. It is with hope of a collective conscientious response that I submit this year’s annual report."
