= Daniel Hynes =

American politician (born 1968)

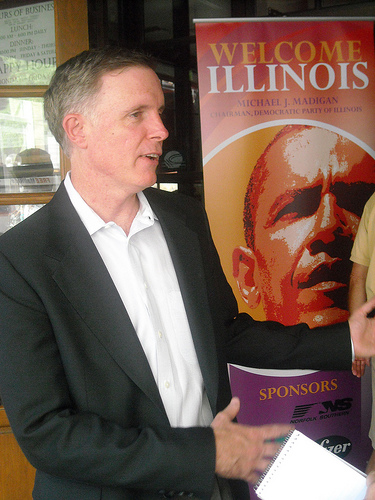
- Hynes in 2008

6th Comptroller of Illinois
- In office January 11, 1999 – January 10, 2011
- Governor: George Ryan; Rod Blagojevich; Pat Quinn
- Preceded by: Loleta Didrickson
- Succeeded by: Judy Baar Topinka

Personal details
- Born: July 20, 1968 (age 57) Chicago, Illinois, U.S.
- Party: Democratic
- Spouse: Christina Kerger
- Parent: Thomas Hynes (father)
- Education: University of Notre Dame (BA); Loyola University Chicago (JD)

Daniel W. Hynes (born July 20, 1968) is an American politician, formerly serving as the Illinois Comptroller.

== Early life ==
Hynes was born in Chicago, the son of Thomas Hynes, a former Cook County assessor, president of the Illinois Senate and Democratic Ward committeeman of the 19th ward in Chicago, Illinois. He attended St. Ignatius College Prep in Chicago, where he graduated in 1986.

Hynes later attended the University of Notre Dame, where he graduated magna cum laude in 1990 with a Bachelor of Science degree in economics and computer applications. He received his Juris Doctor degree with honors from Loyola University Chicago's School of Law in 1993. Daniel Hynes served as a health care attorney at the Chicago law firm of Hogan, Marren and McCahill, Ltd.

== Illinois Comptroller ==
Hynes was first elected Illinois Comptroller in 1998, at the age of 30. At the time, he was the youngest elected statewide constitutional officer in Illinois, since William Stratton was elected Treasurer of Illinois in 1942. Since first entering office in 1999, he was the first Comptroller to establish a "Rainy Day Fund" for Illinois as a way to secure funding for the state whenever there is a slowdown in revenue.

During the 2000 presidential election, Hynes was listed as an Illinois state co-chair of GoreNet. GoreNet was a young-Americans-focused group that supported the Al Gore campaign with a focus on grassroots and online organizing as well as hosting small dollar donor events.

Hynes also spearheaded bipartisan reform of laws governing the state's private cemeteries and funeral homes (which his office regulates) in 2001, the most extensive overhaul of these industries in 25 years.

Dan Hynes has sponsored new legislation that prohibited tax scofflaws from receiving state contracts. He also introduced legislation in 2003, that would do the same to corporations that have falsified their financial reports. Among his other measures as Comptroller, was to reform the Local Government Division of his office, increasing the percentage of compliance from Illinois's local government units in financial reporting from 65 to 95 percent.

Hynes also expanded the office's commercial direct deposit program, encouraging state vendors to receive payments electronically, which saves taxpayer money and improves efficiency. Daniel Hynes was elected to a second term as Comptroller in 2002, with a margin of more than one million votes. He was elected to a third term in 2006, by a similarly large margin.

== U.S. Senate campaign ==
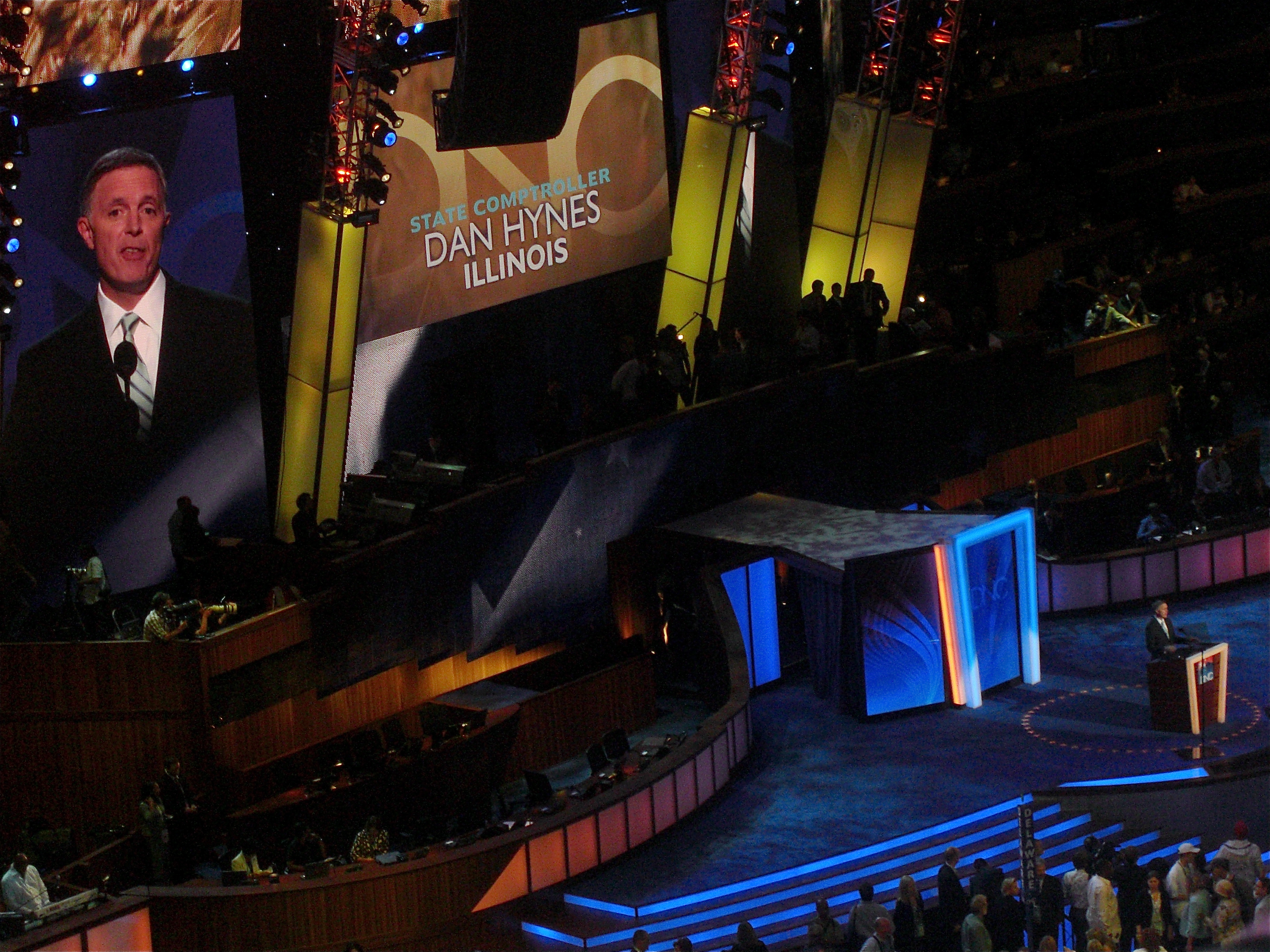
Hynes speaks on the first day of the 2008 Democratic National Convention in Denver, Colorado.

In March 2004, Hynes was an unsuccessful candidate in the Democratic primary election, for his party's nomination for the United States Senate, finishing second to State Senator Barack Obama, who went on to win the general election in November. In September 2006, in an open letter published in the Chicago Sun-Times, Hynes endorsed drafting Obama into the presidential race of 2008. Hynes spoke on the first day of the 2008 Democratic National Convention in Denver, Colorado, lauding Obama.

== 2010 gubernatorial campaign ==
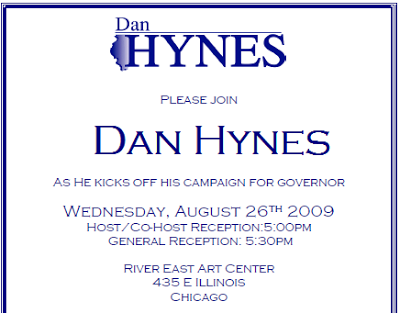
Invitation to an early fundraiser for Hynes' campaign

Hynes challenged Governor Pat Quinn for the Democratic nomination for Governor of Illinois, formally announcing his campaign on September 2, 2009. His campaign received the endorsement of former United States Senator Adlai E. Stevenson III.

His newspaper endorsements included the Daily Herald, Kane County Chronicle, Northwest Herald, South Suburban News, Peoria Journal Star, The News-Gazette (Champaign-Urbana), The State Journal-Register (Springfield), and the Southtown Star. After a close vote, on February 4, 2010, Hynes conceded to Quinn and pledged his support to Quinn in the general election.

== After politics ==
After leaving the Illinois Comptroller's office, Hynes joined Fort Myers, Florida based Foster & Foster Actuaries & Consultants. On January 19, 2012, it was reported that Hynes would be joining Ariel Investments, a Chicago investment management firm, as a senior vice president to aid in client services, marketing and business development. In 2015, Hynes moved to UBS Global Asset Management as head of Taft Hartley & large market public Chicago.

In 2016, Hynes was the sole superdelegate supporting former Maryland Governor Martin O'Malley. O'Malley dropped out after the Iowa Caucus in February, after failing to win any delegates, leaving Hillary Clinton and Bernie Sanders as the two remaining Democratic candidates, for the rest of the primary calendar.

In 2018, Dan Hynes was appointed by J. B. Pritzker as one of four Deputy Governors (the others being Founding La Casa Norte Director Sol Flores, State Representative Christian Mitchell and Chicago Park District President Jesse Ruiz). He left the Pritzker Administration in 2021.

== Personal life ==
Hynes married Dr. Christina Kerger (M.D) in June 1999.

== Electoral history ==
- 1998 Democratic Primary Election for Comptroller
  - Daniel Hynes (D), unopposed
- 1998 General Election for Comptroller
  - Daniel Hynes (D), 58.6%
  - Chris Lauzen (R), 39.6%
  - Houstoun McIntosh Sadler II (Reform), 1.7%
- 2002 Democratic Primary Election for Comptroller
  - Daniel Hynes (D) (inc.), unopposed
- 2002 General Election for Comptroller
  - Daniel Hynes (D) (inc.), 63.2%
  - Thomas Jefferson Ramsdell (R), 30.6%
  - Julie Fox (Libertarian), 4.2%
- 2004 Democratic Primary Election for U.S. Senate.
  - Barack Obama, 52.8%
  - Daniel Hynes, 23.7%
  - Blair Hull, 10.8%
  - Maria Pappas, 6.0%
  - Gery Chico, 4.3%
  - Nancy Skinner, 1.3%
  - Joyce Washington, 1.1%
- 2006 Democratic Primary Election for Comptroller
  - Daniel Hynes (D) (inc.), unopposed
- 2006 General Election for Comptroller
  - Daniel Hynes (D) (inc.), 64.2%
  - Carole Pankau (R), 31.5%
  - Alicia Snyder (Green), 4.3%
- 2010 Democratic Primary Election for Governor
  - Pat Quinn (D) (inc.), 50.4%
  - Daniel Hynes (D), 49.6%

Party political offices
Preceded by Earlean Collins	Democratic nominee for Comptroller of Illinois; 1998, 2002, 2006	Succeeded by David E. Miller
Political offices
Preceded by Loleta Didrickson	Comptroller of Illinois; 1999-2011	Succeeded by Judy Baar Topinka
