= 1998 United States Senate election in Illinois =

- November 3, 1998
- Turnout: 50.25%
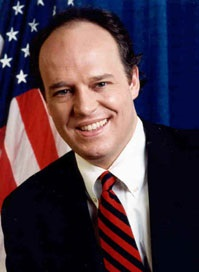

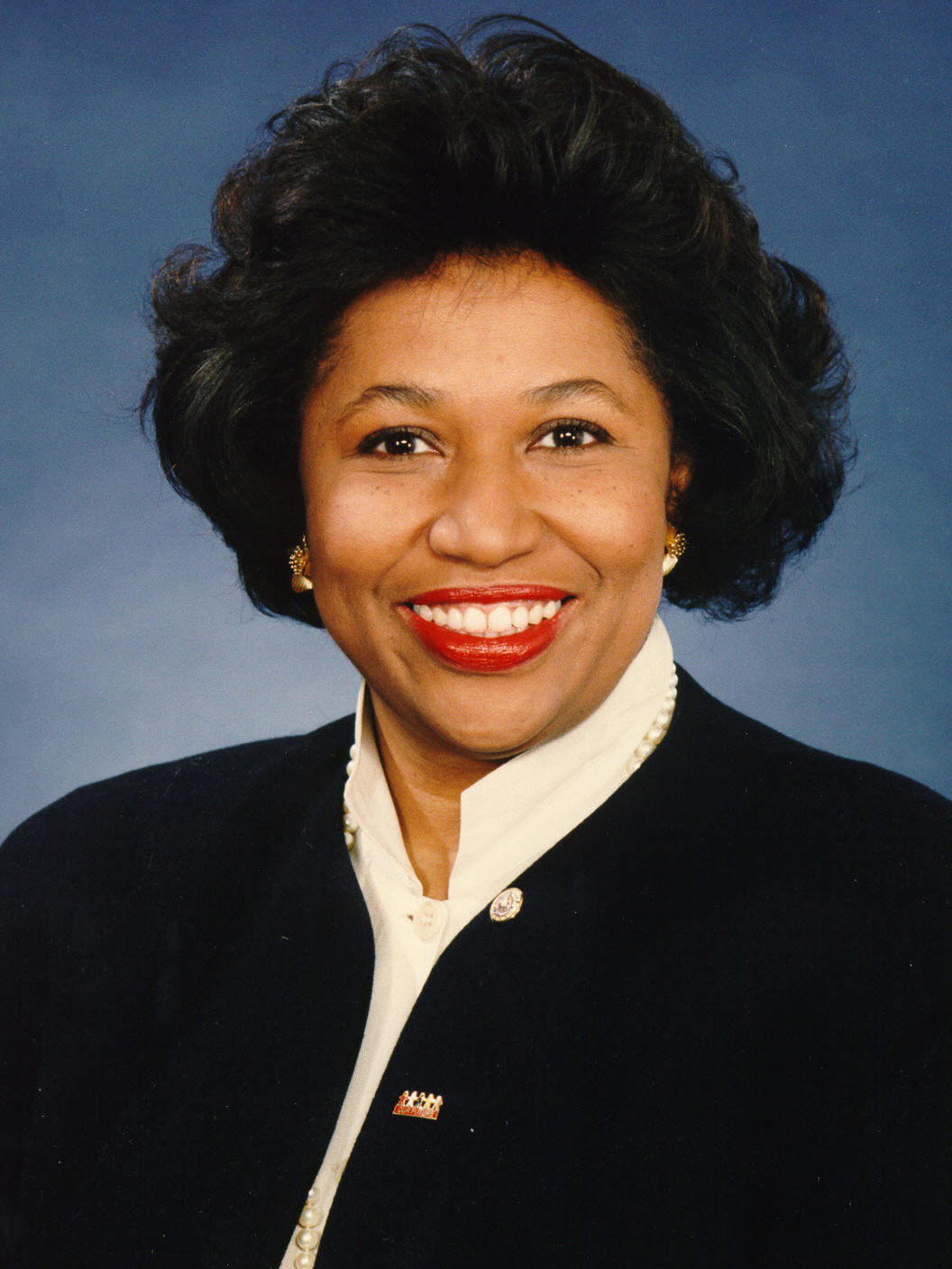
Nominee	Peter Fitzgerald	Carol Moseley Braun
Party	Republican	Democratic
Popular vote	1,709,042	1,610,496
Percentage	50.35%	47.44%
- County results Fitzgerald: 40–50% 50–60% 60–70% 70–80% Braun: 40–50% 50–60% 60–70%
U.S. senator before election
Carol Moseley Braun
Democratic
Elected U.S. Senator
Peter Fitzgerald
Republican

The 1998 United States Senate election in Illinois was held November 3, 1998. Democratic incumbent Carol Moseley Braun ran for re-election to a second term in office but was defeated by Republican state senator Peter Fitzgerald.

In the Republican primary election, Fitzgerald narrowly defeated state comptroller Loleta Didrickson. Braun was unopposed. In the primary elections, turnout was 20.55% with 1,386,694 total votes cast.

In the general election, Braun was dogged by a series of controversies which had marred her first term in office, and Fitzgerald led in most public opinion polling, often by a large margin. However, Braun closed the gap late in the campaign by appealing to African American voters. On Election Day, Braun won a large majority of the vote in Cook County, beating polling by several points, but Fitzgerald won the race by a surprisingly close margin. Fitzgerald was the only Republican candidate to defeat an incumbent Democratic senator in 1998.

== Background ==
During Moseley Braun's first term as U.S. senator, she was plagued by several major controversies. In 1993, she was the subject of a Federal Election Commission investigation over $249,000 in unaccounted campaign funds. The commission found that Braun had violated campaign finance law but took no action, citing a lack of resources. Moseley Braun admitted only to bookkeeping errors. The Justice Department turned down two requests by the Internal Revenue Service to investigate.

In 1996, Moseley Braun made a private trip to Nigeria, where she met with military dictator Sani Abacha. Despite U.S. sanctions against the country and Abacha, the senator did not notify nor register her trip with the United States Department of State. She subsequently defended Abacha's human rights record in Congress.

== Democratic primary ==
=== Candidates ===
- Carol Moseley Braun, incumbent U.S. senator since 1993

=== Results ===
Democratic primary results
Party	Candidate	Votes	%
Democratic	Carol Moseley Braun (incumbent)	666,419	100.00%
Total votes		666,419	100.00%

== Republican primary ==
=== Candidates ===
- Loleta Didrickson, Illinois comptroller
- Peter Fitzgerald, state senator from Inverness

=== Campaign ===
Fitzgerald, a multimillionaire, spent nearly $7 million in the Republican primary.

=== Results ===
Fitzgerald won the Republican primary with 51.8% of the vote to Didrickson's 48.2%.

Republican primary results
Party	Candidate	Votes	%
Republican	Peter Fitzgerald	372,916	51.83%
Republican	Loleta Didrickson	346,606	48.17%
Total votes		719,522	100.00%

Results by county Map legend: Fitzgerald—80–90%; Fitzgerald—70–80%; Fitzgerald—60–70%; Fitzgerald—50–60%; Didrickson—50–60%

== Reform primary ==
=== Candidates ===
- Steve Denarie
- Don A. Torgersen

=== Results ===
Reform primary results
Party	Candidate	Votes	%
Reform	Don A. Torgersen	403	53.52%
Reform	Steve Denari	350	46.48%
Total votes		753	100.00%

== General election ==
=== Candidates ===
- Carol Moseley Braun, incumbent U.S. senator since 1993 (Democratic)
- Peter Fitzgerald, state senator from Inverness (Republican)
- Raymond Stalker (U.S. Taxpayers)
- Don A. Torgersen (Reform)

=== Campaign ===
In September, Moseley Braun created controversy again by using the racial slur "nigger" in describing her own experiences with racism.

Most polls over the first few months showed Moseley-Braun trailing badly. However, after she was helped in the final month by notable Democrats such as first lady Hillary Clinton and U.S. Representative Luis Gutiérrez, three polls published in the last week showed her within the margin of error, and, in one poll, running even with Fitzgerald.

Between the primary and general election, Fitzgerald spent over $12 million in total on the two races.

=== Polling ===
Poll source	Date(s)	Sample size (Note: Key: A – all adults RV – registered voters LV – likely voters V – unclear)	Margin of error	Carol Moseley Braun (D)	Peter Fitzgerald (R)	Undecided
Harris Insights & Analytics	October 30, 1998	847	—	39%	58%	3%
Zogby International (Note: Poll sponsored by the St. Louis Dispatch and KMOV TV)	October 28–29, 1998	703 (LV)	± 4.0%	45%	42%	13%
Richard Day Research Inc.	October 27, 1998	712	—	40%	50%	10%
Mason-Dixon	October 24–26, 1998	813 (LV)	± 3.5%	41%	49%	10%
Harris Insights & Analytics	October 20, 1998	1,209	—	38%	52%	10%
Illinois Wesleyan University	October 20, 1998	423	—	31%	53%	16%
KRC/Communications Research	October 20, 1998	400	—	40%	50%	10%
Market Shares Corp. (Note: Poll sponsored by the Chicago Tribune)	October 17–20, 1998	1,009 (LV)	± 3.0%	38%	48%	14%
University of Illinois at Chicago	October 16, 1998	597	—	31%	48%	21%
WCIA-TV	October 14, 1998	401	—	37%	54%	9%
Mason-Dixon	October 10–12, 1998	830 (LV)	± 3.5%	37%	49%	14%
Market Shares Corp.	October 3–6, 1998	1,009 (LV)	± 3.0%	36%	49%	15%
Market Shares Corp.	September 19–22, 1998	1,102 (LV)	± 3.0%	38%	48%	14%
Mason-Dixon	September 11–14, 1998	811 (LV)	± 3.5%	37%	46%	17%
KRC Communications Research (Note: Poll sponsored by the Chicago Sun-Times & WBBM-TV)	September 8–10, 1998	400 (LV)	± 4.8%	35%	50%	15%
Zogby International	August 31 – September 1, 1998	726 (LV)	± 4.0%	35%	46%	19%
Market Shares Corp.	August 11–17, 1998	1,109 (RV)	± 4.0%	39%	46%	15%
Mason-Dixon	July 10–13, 1998	807 (LV)	± 3.5%	46%	42%	12%
University of Illinois (Note: Poll sponsored by the University of Illinois at Chicago)	June 9 – July 3, 1998	465 (LV)	± 5.0%	49%	31%	20%
Mason-Dixon	March 8–10, 1998	831 (LV)	± 3.0%	42%	41%	17%
WCIA-TV	March 5–10, 1998	952 (RV)	± 3.0%	41%	41%	18%
Mason-Dixon	February 6–8, 1998	804 (RV)	± 3.5%	43%	38%	19%
Market Shares Corp.	January 28–29, 1998	700 (RV)	± 3.7%	41%	35%	24%

=== Results ===
Moseley Braun was narrowly defeated, winning only five of Illinois's 102 counties. However, the race was much closer than expected, thanks to Moseley Braun's massive margin in Cook County and the city of Chicago.

For the general election, turnout was 50.25%, with 3,394,521 votes cast.

1998 United States Senate election in Illinois
Party	Candidate	Votes	%	±%
Republican	Peter Fitzgerald	1,709,041	50.35%	+7.4%
Democratic	Carol Moseley Braun (incumbent)	1,610,496	47.44%	−5.6%
Reform	Don Torgersen	74,704	2.20%	N/A
US Taxpayers	Raymond Stalker	280	0.01%	N/A
Total votes		3,394,521	100.00%	N/A
Republican gain from Democratic				

== Aftermath ==
Fitzgerald initially sought to run for re-election to a second term in 2004. However, after many Republicans and Democrats announced their intentions to challenge him, Fitzgerald decided to retire. On January 3, 2005, Fitzgerald was succeeded by Democrat Barack Obama.

== See also ==
- 1998 United States Senate elections

== Notes ==
Partisan clients
