= Waffle (speech) =

Argumentative strategy

Waffle is language without meaning; blathering, babbling, droning. It generally refers to speaking or writing in a vague, trivial, or nonsensical manner without making any clear or important points. This can occur during presentations, essays, or casual conversations, often to fill time or when the speaker lacks substantial material. The term likely derives from the Scots verb waff, meaning "to wave" or "fluctuate," which aligns with the meandering and aimless nature of waffling speech. Another theory suggests that the term emerged from the idea of waffle batter spreading in an irregular, non-linear pattern, much like incoherent talk.

To waffle, particularly in the U.S., can also denote indecision about particular subjects, or changing one's mind frequently on a topic. Doonesbury referenced this by depicting U.S. President Bill Clinton as a waffle who would switch sides on issues to gain approval
