= Richard Phelan (politician) =

American politician (1937–2024)

President of the Cook County Board of Commissioners
- In office December 1990 – December 1994
- Preceded by: George Dunne
- Succeeded by: John H. Stroger

Personal details
- Born: March 29, 1937 Chicago, Illinois, U.S.
- Died: March 26, 2024 (aged 86) Lake Forest, Illinois, U.S.
- Party: Democratic

Richard John Phelan (March 29, 1937 – March 26, 2024) was an American politician from the state of Illinois. He was special counsel to the House Ethics Committee investigating Speaker Jim Wright in the late 1980s. Phelan was then elected as Cook County Board President from 1990 to 1994. His campaign was Chicago's and Illinois' top 1990 election in terms of coverage and importance, as Phelan brought a reform agenda, beating out the candidates of the Regular Cook County Democratic Party. His campaign included campaign manager Eric Adelstein, media consultant David Axelrod, field director Pete Giangreco, Rahm Emanuel, who did opposition research, issues director Don Wiener, fundraiser Mary Beth Sova, and field assistant Troy Deckert.

Phelan was an unsuccessful candidate for the Democratic gubernatorial nomination in 1994.

Phelan died from cancer at his home in Lake Forest, Illinois, on March 26, 2024, at the age of 86.

== See also ==
- 1990 Cook County, Illinois, elections

Preceded by George Dunne	Cook County Board President; 1990–1994	Succeeded by John H. Stroger
