= Jack Roeser =

American engineer (1923–2014)

John Otto Roeser (August 31, 1923 – June 13, 2014) was an American engineer, inventor, entrepreneur, businessman, civic leader and candidate for elected office.

Roeser was born in Chicago, the youngest son of Irene and Otto Roeser. As a boy, he designed and built free flight model aircraft winning national championships.

Roeser was the chairman and founder of Otto Engineering Inc. in Carpentersville, Illinois, which manufactures electronic control and communication switches for aerospace, medical and industrial uses since 1961. In 2006, Otto had over 500 employees and annual sales of over $79 million. He received over 50 patents in electrical, mechanical, machinery and marine products.

Roeser enlisted in the Army in 1942 and served during World War II as a corporal in the 1689th Engineer Battalion Combat Engineers in the Pacific Theater. He served in combat with distinction fighting the Japanese in the Philippines, most notably in the Battle of Leyte. He was one of the first U.S. soldiers to set foot on Japan after its surrender to the Allies in 1945.

In 1948, he received his Bachelor of Science in mechanical engineering from the University of Illinois, graduating with Pi Tau Sigma honors. In 1996, Roeser was chosen as an Outstanding Alumnus of the University of Illinois.

After graduating from the University of Illinois and before founding Otto Engineering, he worked at the Hawthorne Works and started three other businesses that are now owned by other corporations.

Roeser was a competitive sailor. Of the many trophies his boat The Jeannine had won, the most prestigious is the Chicago-Mackinac Cup awarded in 1988 for winning the 90th running of the Chicago Yacht Club Race to Mackinac. Roeser lived in Barrington, Illinois, with his wife, Jeannine.

== Civic and political activities ==
Roeser was the founder and president of the Family Taxpayers Foundation, a 501(c)(3) non-profit organization. The foundation claims as its primary focus the promotion of school choice as a catalyst for improvement in the public school system and as a vehicle for choices in education that will benefit students and empower parents.

Roeser was the publisher of Champion News, an internet news service which also had a Chicago talk radio program broadcast on WIND (AM) 560 AM.

Roeser challenged the incumbent Governor Jim Edgar in the Republican primary in 1994 and lost the election, receiving only 25% of the vote. He also served by appointment on Governor Edgar's Education Transition Team and Lamar Alexander's Education 2000 in Illinois.

As a conservative activist, Roeser "helped develop the Tea Party movement in Illinois" and was active in the movement. He "was a generous donor to local and national GOP candidates".

Bob Kjellander, treasurer of the Republican National Committee, referred to Roeser as "rule-or-ruin Republican" who frequently abandoned his own party when someone he backed in a primary lost. During his ill-fated run for Governor of Illinois in 1994, many Republican insiders were dismissive of Roeser's appeal, even among Republicans, especially more moderate Republicans.

As noted by the Chicago Tribune in his obituary, while Roeser never disavowed any comments he had made, his own rhetoric also helped cast him as an outsider. Most candidates he backed in major politics were defeated, including his own ill-fated bid against Jim Edgar in 1994.

In 2004, a Federal Election Commission complaint by a Washington, D.C.–based group, Citizens for Responsibility and Ethics in Washington, alleged that Roeser illegally funded a series of attack advertisements against Barack Obama who was running for the U.S. Senate against Alan Keyes. Roeser, who pledged to raise $1 million for Keyes' campaign, contributed $40,000 to Empower Illinois and a related group and also met with Keyes to discuss his campaign. According to a settlement issued by the FEC, the Empower Illinois Media Fund violated campaign rules by raising money to defeat Obama without registering with the FEC as a political committee or complying with federal contribution limits and reporting requirements. Empower Illinois agreed to pay a $3,000 penalty and retroactively report its expenses and contributors. But the FEC could not prove Roeser was complicit in the groups' violations.

== Awards ==
Business

- High Tech Entrepreneur of the Year, 1991

Military Service

- Bronze De Fleury Medal, May 13, 2008

Education

- Elgin Community College Friend of Education Award
- "Miracle on 41st Street" Award by St. Elizabeth School

== Otto Engineering ==
Roeser's company, Otto Engineering, manufactures military-qualified switches and other products It has over 450 employees and has been awarded 278 government defense contracts. From 2000 to 2013, these contracts have netted Otto Engineering $5,142,512.
