= 2016 Illinois Comptroller special election =

- November 8, 2016
- Turnout: 67.41%
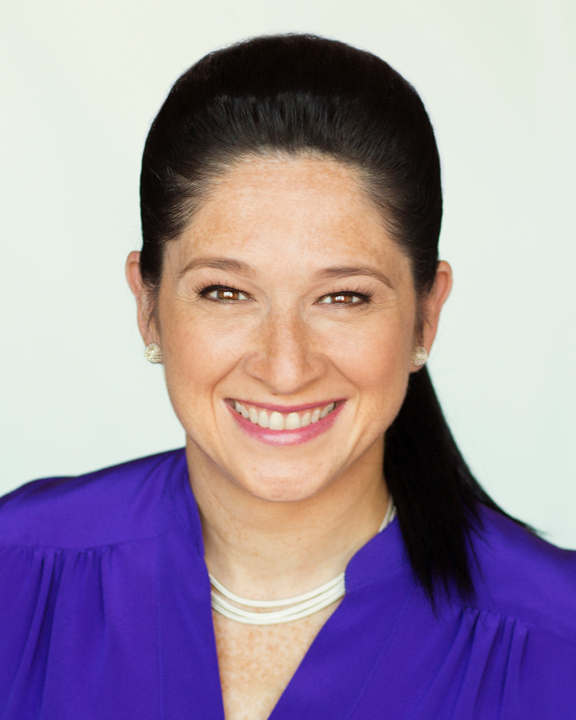

Nominee	Susana Mendoza	Leslie Munger
Party	Democratic	Republican
Popular vote	2,676,244	2,404,723
Percentage	49.45%	44.43%
- Mendoza: 40–50% 50–60% 60–70% 70–80% 80–90% >90% Munger: 40–50% 50–60% 60–70% 70–80% 80–90% >90% Tie: 40–50% No votes
Comptroller before election
Leslie Munger
Republican
Elected Comptroller
Susana Mendoza
Democratic

A special election for Illinois Comptroller took place on November 8, 2016. After comptroller Judy Baar Topinka died shortly after her reelection in 2014, Republican Governor Bruce Rauner appointed Leslie Munger, a former business executive and unsuccessful 2014 nominee for the Illinois House of Representatives, to fill her seat at the beginning of his term in 2015. Per Illinois state law, a special election was held to elect a comptroller to finish Topinka's term. Munger ran as the Republican nominee against Democratic Chicago City Clerk Susana Mendoza. State Senator Daniel Biss ran for the Democratic nomination, but dropped out in November 2015.

Mendoza defeated Munger by 49.45% of the vote to Munger's 44.43%, becoming Illinois' tenth comptroller on December 5, 2016.

== Election information ==
The primaries and general elections coincided with those for federal elections (president, House and Senate), as well as those for other state offices.

=== Background ===
Topinka died in December 2014, shortly after being re-elected to a second term in November, but before that second term began, outgoing Democratic Governor Pat Quinn (who lost his own bid for re-election) appointed his former budget chief Jerry Stermer to fill the remainder of Topinka's first term, allowing Governor-elect Bruce Rauner to make his own appointment for what would have been Topinka's second full term.

In an early January 2015 special session, the Democratic-led Illinois General Assembly approved a bill requiring that a special election be held at the next regular statewide election for any vacancy in any statewide executive office that occurs more than 28 months before the end of the term. Governor Quinn signed the bill shortly thereafter. Whoever incoming Governor Bruce Rauner appointed to fill Topinka's second term would serve only until a 2016 special election, instead of serving the full four-year term. The special election law received criticism from Republicans, who described it as a move to weaken Governor Rauner by shortening the term of his appointee.

=== Turnout ===
For the state-run primaries (Democratic and Republican), turnout was 35.94%, with 2,755,220 votes cast. For the general election, turnout was 67.41%, with 5,412,543 votes cast.

== Democratic primary ==
=== Candidates ===
==== Declared ====
- Susana Mendoza, City Clerk of Chicago

==== Withdrew ====
- Daniel Biss, state senator

=== Results ===
Democratic primary results
Party	Candidate	Votes	%
Democratic	Susana Mendoza	1,626,175	100.00%
Total votes		1,626,175	100.00%

== Republican primary ==
=== Candidates ===
==== Declared ====
- Leslie Munger, incumbent Comptroller

=== Results ===
Republican primary results
Party	Candidate	Votes	%
Republican	Leslie Munger (incumbent)	1,129,045	100.00%
Total votes		1,129,045	100.00%

== Libertarian Party ==
=== Candidates ===
==== Declared ====
- Claire Ball, corporate accountant, U.S. Cellular

== Green Party ==
=== Candidates ===
==== Declared ====
- Tim Curtin, former international representative for United Electrical, Radio and Machine Workers of America Local 925 national staff

== General election ==
=== Endorsements ===
Leslie Munger
- The News-Gazette
- Herald-Whig
- Belleville News-Democrat
- Chicago Sun-Times
- Chicago Tribune
- Rockford Register Star
- The Chicago Defender
- The State Journal-Register
- Daily Herald
- Journal Star

=== Results ===
2016 Illinois Comptroller special election
Party	Candidate	Votes	%	±%
Democratic	Susana Mendoza	2,676,244	49.45%	+3.78%
Republican	Leslie Munger (incumbent)	2,404,723	44.43%	−5.13%
Libertarian	Claire Ball	187,017	3.46%	−1.30%
Green	Tim Curtin	144,559	2.59%	N/A
Total votes		5,412,543	100.00%	N/A
Democratic gain from Republican				
