= 2014 Illinois elections =

- November 4, 2014
- Turnout: 49.18%

A general election was held in the U.S. state of Illinois on November 4, 2014. All of Illinois' executive officers were up for election as well as a United States Senate seat, and all of Illinois' eighteen seats in the United States House of Representatives. Primary elections were held on March 18, 2014.

== Election information ==
2014 was a midterm election year in the United States.

=== Turnout ===
==== Primary election ====
For the primary election, turnout was 18.09%, with 1,357,807 votes cast.

Turnout by county

County	Registration	Votes cast	Turnout
Adams	45,771	7,942	17.35%
Alexander	5,588	1,082	19.36%
Bond	12,146	1,579	13.00%
Boone	32,955	6,675	20.25%
Brown	3,525	712	20.20%
Bureau	24,173	5,136	21.25%
Calhoun	3,722	1,730	46.48%
Carroll	11,388	2,865	25.16%
Cass	8,467	2,570	30.35%
Champaign	110,100	23,299	21.16%
Christian	22,235	5,713	25.69%
Clark	11,626	2,185	18.79%
Clay	8,899	1,322	14.86%
Clinton	24,712	3,475	14.06%
Coles	29,736	9,310	31.31%
Cook (Note: For more on Cook County primary turnout, see 2014 Cook County, Illinois elections#Voter turnout)	2,819,883	458,396	16.26%
Crawford	14,437	3,528	24.44%
Cumberland	7,417	1,662	22.41%
DeKalb	57,903	8,642	14.92%
DeWitt	11,843	3,544	29.92%
Douglas	11,686	3,717	31.81%
DuPage	576,737	110,696	19.19%
Edgar	12,487	3,941	31.56%
Edwards	4,390	938	21.37%
Effingham	22,568	8,375	37.11%
Fayette	14,996	3,796	25.31%
Ford	8,526	3,031	35.55%
Franklin	29,413	4,654	15.82%
Fulton	25,882	6,478	25.03%
Gallatin	3,847	1,070	27.81%
Greene	8,642	1,530	17.70%
Grundy	29,795	5,740	19.26%
Hamilton	5,662	2,655	46.89%
Hancock	12,292	2,857	23.24%
Hardin	3,055	611	20.00%
Henderson	4,847	1,983	40.91%
Henry	35,928	5,894	16.41%
Iroquois	18,278	4,512	24.69%
Jackson	38,401	6,782	17.66%
Jasper	6,777	1,755	25.90%
Jefferson	23,134	7,355	31.79%
Jersey	18,239	2,719	14.91%
Jo Daviess	15,601	3,159	20.25%
Johnson	7,954	3,976	49.99%
Kane	269,208	44,082	16.37%
Kankakee	64,377	10,835	16.83%
Kendall	67,129	12,568	18.72%
Knox	32,448	4,743	14.62%
Lake	402,644	56,616	14.06%
LaSalle	66,775	12,250	18.35%
Lawrence	9,354	1,857	19.85%
Lee	23,312	6,344	27.21%
Livingston	21,092	7,740	36.70%
Logan	19,356	5,254	27.14%
Macon	75,053	11,978	15.96%
Macoupin	30,814	9,638	31.28%
Madison	176,987	26,131	14.76%
Marion	24,254	3,606	14.87%
Marshall	8,160	1,695	20.77%
Mason	10,002	3,070	30.69%
Massac	11,238	1,667	14.83%
McDonough	16,527	3,116	18.85%
McHenry	204,440	34,700	16.97%
McLean	99,351	28,439	28.62%
Menard	8,648	3,890	44.98%
Mercer	11,935	2,953	24.74%
Monroe	23,542	3,830	16.27%
Montgomery	17,359	3,792	21.84%
Morgan	22,063	4,765	21.60%
Moultrie	8,646	1,549	17.92%
Ogle	33,519	10,350	30.88%
Peoria	109,927	20,423	18.58%
Perry	14,293	3,584	25.08%
Piatt	11,999	2,782	23.19%
Pike	11,883	3,325	27.98%
Pope	2,999	703	23.44%
Pulaski	4,626	864	18.68%
Putnam	4,143	1,936	46.73%
Randolph	20,465	6,707	32.77%
Richland	11,417	1,553	13.60%
Rock Island	95,070	19,056	20.04%
Saline	16,100	4,288	26.63%
Sangamon	133,114	30,870	23.19%
Schuyler	5,372	1,976	36.78%
Scott	4,802	806	16.78%
Shelby	15,058	5,986	39.75%
Stark	4,291	1,522	35.47%
St. Clair	171,162	30,282	17.69%
Stephenson	33,385	7,706	23.08%
Tazewell	86,869	12,509	14.40%
Union	12,393	2,691	21.71%
Vermilion	47,217	8,602	18.22%
Wabash	8,921	1,765	19.78%
Warren	11,876	2,148	18.09%
Washington	9,874	3,254	32.96%
Wayne	12,323	4,186	33.97%
White	10,939	1,754	16.03%
Whiteside	36,946	5,661	15.32%
Will	395,131	60,719	15.37%
Williamson	42,013	6,406	15.25%
Winnebago	171,537	29,330	17.10%
Woodford	24,961	7,364	29.50%
Total	7,505,002	1,357,807	18.09%

==== General election ====
For the general election, turnout was 49.18%, with 3,680,417 votes cast.

Turnout by county

County	Registration	Votes cast	Turnout%
Adams	44,280	22,724	51.32%
Alexander	5,634	2,457	43.61%
Bond	12,243	5,019	40.99%
Boone	32,036	15,400	48.07%
Brown	3,468	1,622	46.77%
Bureau	24,311	12,956	53.29%
Calhoun	3,694	2,060	55.77%
Carroll	11,440	5,681	49.66%
Cass	8,747	3,888	44.45%
Champaign	113,122	55,434	49.00%
Christian	22,351	11,807	52.83%
Clark	11,629	5,292	45.51%
Clay	8,982	4,011	44.66%
Clinton	24,679	12,960	52.51%
Coles	30,204	15,017	49.72%
Cook (Note: For more on Cook County general election turnout, see 2014 Cook County, Illinois elections#Voter turnout)	2,767,432	1,364,436	49.30%
Crawford	14,569	6,471	44.42%
Cumberland	7,508	4,004	53.33%
DeKalb	58,482	28,438	48.63%
DeWitt	12,151	5,570	45.84%
Douglas	11,693	6,108	52.24%
DuPage	587,216	288,692	49.16%
Edgar	12,507	6,511	52.06%
Edwards	4,440	2,379	53.58%
Effingham	22,414	12,380	55.23%
Fayette	15,022	6,671	44.41%
Ford	8,695	4,548	52.31%
Franklin	28,985	13,082	45.13%
Fulton	25,594	11,242	43.92%
Gallatin	3,791	1,939	51.15%
Greene	8,732	4,497	51.50%
Grundy	30,095	16,780	55.76%
Hamilton	5,681	3,346	58.90%
Hancock	12,003	6,072	50.59%
Hardin	3,096	1,545	49.90%
Henderson	4,904	2,700	55.06%
Henry	34,933	17,969	51.44%
Iroquois	18,481	9,561	51.73%
Jackson	40,116	16,521	41.18%
Jasper	6,707	4,244	63.28%
Jefferson	23,119	12,732	55.07%
Jersey	18,386	8,276	45.01%
Jo Daviess	15,782	7,916	50.16%
Johnson	8,133	4,723	58.07%
Kane	275,885	126,912	46.00%
Kankakee	61,292	34,576	56.41%
Kendall	67,829	32,586	48.04%
Knox	32,715	16,314	49.87%
Lake	404,004	202,532	50.13%
LaSalle	67,532	35,823	53.05%
Lawrence	9,221	4,243	46.01%
Lee	23,335	11,455	49.09%
Livingston	21,296	11,365	53.37%
Logan	19,263	8,850	45.94%
Macon	75,200	33,796	44.94%
Macoupin	31,160	16,145	51.81%
Madison	178,845	80,241	44.87%
Marion	24,736	12,084	48.85%
Marshall	8,245	4,306	52.23%
Mason	10,030	5,411	53.95%
Massac	11,293	4,383	38.81%
McDonough	16,865	8,728	51.75%
McHenry	206,197	94,609	45.88%
McLean	103,672	51,006	49.2%
Menard	8,683	4,955	57.07%
Mercer	12,122	6,678	55.09%
Monroe	24,374	12,741	52.27%
Montgomery	17,225	8,901	51.67%
Morgan	22,084	11,388	51.57%
Moultrie	8,718	4,625	53.05%
Ogle	33,852	17,279	51.04%
Peoria	112,254	52,913	47.14%
Perry	14,282	7,454	52.19%
Piatt	11,988	7,176	59.86%
Pike	11,936	5,907	49.49%
Pope	2,945	1,637	55.59%
Pulaski	4,676	2,774	59.32%
Putnam	4,241	2,636	62.16%
Randolph	20,792	11,518	55.40%
Richland	11,058	5,081	45.95%
Rock Island	93,478	45,527	48.70%
Saline	15,995	8,179	51.13%
Sangamon	136,270	72,784	53.41%
Schuyler	5,406	3,401	62.91%
Scott	4,132	2,251	54.48%
Shelby	14,509	8,212	56.60%
Stark	4,379	1,951	44.55%
St. Clair	174,340	77,710	44.57%
Stephenson	33,639	14,857	44.17%
Tazewell	85,862	43,985	51.23%
Union	12,139	6,385	52.60%
Vermilion	47,048	22,020	46.80%
Wabash	8,715	3,978	45.65%
Warren	11,957	5,548	46.40%
Washington	9,860	5,900	59.84%
Wayne	12,124	6,012	49.59%
White	10,782	6,235	57.83%
Whiteside	37,510	17,860	47.61%
Will	393,738	197,970	50.28%
Williamson	43,318	20,954	48.37%
Winnebago	165,347	79,838	48.29%
Woodford	25,151	14,151	56.26%
Total	7,483,031	3,680,417	49.18%

== Federal elections ==
=== United States Senate ===
Incumbent Democratic senator and Senate Majority Whip Dick Durbin won reelection to a fourth term.

United States Senate election in Illinois, 2014
Party	Candidate	Votes	%
Democratic	Dick Durbin (incumbent)	1,929,637	53.5
Republican	Jim Oberweis	1,538,522	42.7
Libertarian	Sharon Hansen	135,316	3.8
Write-in		44	0.0
Total votes		3,603,519	100.0
Democratic hold			

=== United States House ===
All of Illinois' 18 seats in the United States House of Representatives were up for election in 2014.

The Republican Party flipped two Democratic-held seat, making the composition of Illinois' House delegation 10 Democrats and 8 Republicans.

== Governor and Lieutenant Governor ==
Incumbent Democratic Governor Pat Quinn ran for re-election to a second full term as governor. Quinn, the then-lieutenant governor, assumed the office of governor on January 29, 2009, when Rod Blagojevich was impeached and removed from office. He was narrowly elected to a first full term in 2010.

Quinn was renominated by the Democrats, while the Republicans chose businessman and venture capitalist Bruce Rauner and the Libertarians nominated political activist Chad Grimm.

Previously in Illinois, there were separate primary elections for governor and lieutenant governor, with the winners then running together on the same ticket. In 2011, the law was changed and candidates for governor now pick their own running mate. Incumbent Democratic lieutenant governor Sheila Simon did not run for re-election, instead running unsuccessfully for Comptroller. She was replaced as Quinn's running mate by former Chicago Public Schools CEO Paul Vallas. Rauner chose Wheaton City Councilwoman Evelyn Sanguinetti and Grimm chose Alex Cummings.

Rauner defeated Quinn in the general election by 50.3% of the vote to Quinn's 46.4%. Rauner won every county in Illinois except for Cook County, home to the city of Chicago and 40% of the state's residents.

Illinois gubernatorial election, 2014
Party	Candidate	Votes	%
Republican	Bruce Rauner/Evelyn Sanguinetti	1,823,627	50.3
Democratic	Pat Quinn/Paul Vallas (incumbent)	1,681,343	46.4
Libertarian	Chad Grimm/Alex Cummings	121,534	3.3
Write-in		1,186	0.0
Total votes		3,627,690	100.0
Republican gain from Democratic			

== Attorney General ==
2014 Illinois Attorney General election
- November 4, 2014
- Turnout: 48.15%
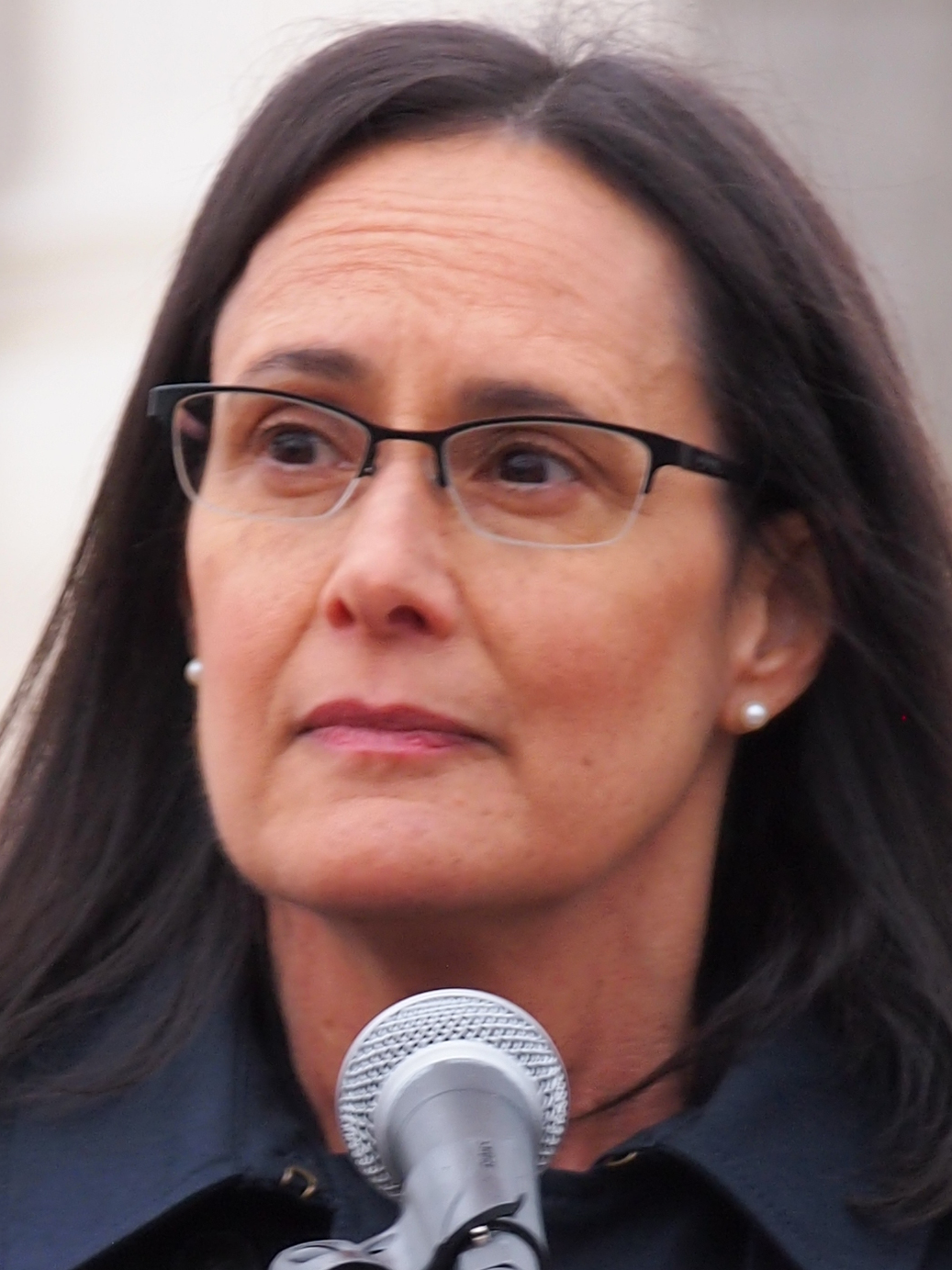

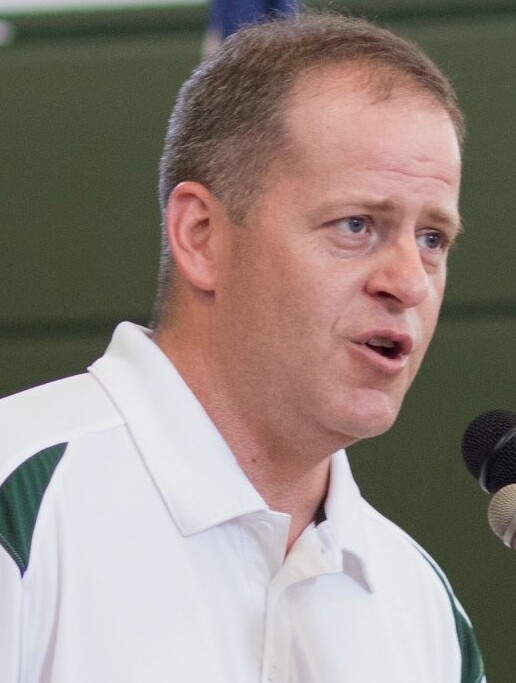
Nominee	Lisa Madigan	Paul Schimpf
Party	Democratic	Republican
Popular vote	2,142,558	1,360,763
Percentage	59.46%	37.77%
- County results Madigan: 40–50% 50–60% 70–80% Schimpf: 40–50% 50–60% 60–70% 70–80%
Attorney General before election
Lisa Madigan
Democratic
Elected Attorney General
Lisa Madigan
Democratic

Incumbent Democratic Attorney General Lisa Madigan ran for re-election to a fourth term in office.

=== Democratic primary ===
==== Candidates ====
===== Declared =====
- Lisa Madigan, Illinois Attorney General

==== Results ====
Democratic primary results
Party	Candidate	Votes	%
Democratic	Lisa Madigan (incumbent)	427,639	100.0
Total votes		427,639	100.0

=== Republican primary ===
==== Candidates ====
===== Declared =====
- Paul Schimpf, attorney and former U.S. Marine Corps infantry officer

===== Withdrew =====
- Mark Curran, Lake County sheriff
- Mike Webster, attorney, accountant, and president Cass School District 63 Board of Education (ran for secretary of state)

===== Declined =====
- Tom Cross, state representative and former minority leader of the Illinois House of Representatives (ran for Treasurer)
- Jim Durkin, state representative (replaced Cross as Minority Leader)

==== Results ====
Republican primary results
Party	Candidate	Votes	%
Republican	Paul Schimpf	640,595	100.0
Total votes		640,595	100.0

=== General election ===
==== Polling ====
Poll source	Date(s) administered	Sample size	Margin of error	Lisa Madigan (D)	Paul Schimpf (R)	Ben Koyl (L)	Other	Undecided
APC Research	October 16–21, 2014	800	± 3.5%	61%	24%	6%	1%	8%
We Ask America	October 6, 2014	1,097	± 3%	56%	31%	5%	—	8%
We Ask America	September 17, 2014	1,071	± 3.1%	53%	32%	6%	—	9%
We Ask America	September 3, 2014	1,096	± 3%	54%	30%	5%	—	11%
We Ask America	July 30, 2014	1,057	± 3.02%	52%	35%	—	—	13%
McKeon & Associates	July 9–10, 2014	800	± 3.9%	46%	37%	—	—	17%
We Ask America	June 16, 2014	1,023	± 3.06%	51%	35%	—	—	14%

==== Results ====
Illinois Attorney General election, 2014
Party	Candidate	Votes	%	±%
Democratic	Lisa Madigan (incumbent)	2,142,558	59.46%	−5.26%
Republican	Paul Schimpf	1,360,763	37.77%	+6.12%
Libertarian	Ben Koyl	99,903	2.77%	+1.30%
Total votes		3,603,224	100.0%	
Democratic hold				

== Secretary of State ==
2014 Illinois Secretary of State election
- November 4, 2014
- Turnout: 48.30%
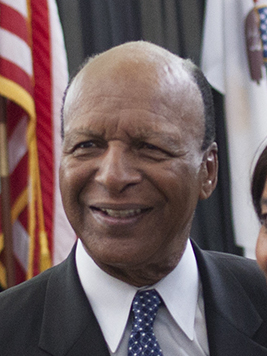

Nominee	Jesse White	Mike Webster
Party	Democratic	Republican
Popular vote	2,374,849	1,134,452
Percentage	65.70%	31.39%
- County results White: 40–50% 50–60% 60–70% 70–80% Webster: 40–50% 50–60%
Secretary of State before election
Jesse White
Democratic
Elected Secretary of State
Jesse White
Democratic

Incumbent Democratic Secretary of State Jesse White ran for re-election to a fifth term in office.

=== Democratic primary ===
==== Candidates ====
===== Declared =====
- Jesse White, Illinois Secretary of State

==== Results ====
Democratic primary results
Party	Candidate	Votes	%
Democratic	Jesse White (incumbent)	448,025	100.0
Total votes		448,025	100.0

=== Republican primary ===
==== Candidates ====
===== Declared =====
- Mike Webster, attorney, accountant, and president of the Cass School District 63 Board of Education

===== Withdrew =====
- Will Lindsey, businessman

==== Results ====
Republican primary results
Party	Candidate	Votes	%
Republican	Mike Webster	644,248	100.0
Total votes		644,248	100.0

=== General election ===
==== Polling ====
Poll source	Date(s) administered	Sample size	Margin of error	Jesse White (D)	Mike Webster (R)	Christopher Michel (L)	Other	Undecided
APC Research	October 16–21, 2014	800	± 3.5%	68%	19%	5%	1%	7%
We Ask America	September 17, 2014	1,071	± 3.1%	61%	28%	5%	—	6%
We Ask America	September 3, 2014	1,096	± 3%	61%	26%	5%	—	7%
We Ask America	July 30, 2014	1,057	± 3.02%	60%	31%	—	—	9%
We Ask America	June 16, 2014	1,023	± 3.06%	63%	29%	—	—	9%

==== Results ====
Illinois Secretary of State election, 2014
Party	Candidate	Votes	%	±%
Democratic	Jesse White (incumbent)	2,374,849	65.70%	−4.17%
Republican	Mike Webster	1,134,452	31.39%	+4.37%
Libertarian	Christopher Michel	104,498	2.89%	−0.22%
Write-in		809	0.02%	N/A
Total votes		3,614,608	100.0%	
Democratic hold				

== Comptroller ==
2014 Illinois State Comptroller election
- November 4, 2014
- Turnout: 47.89%
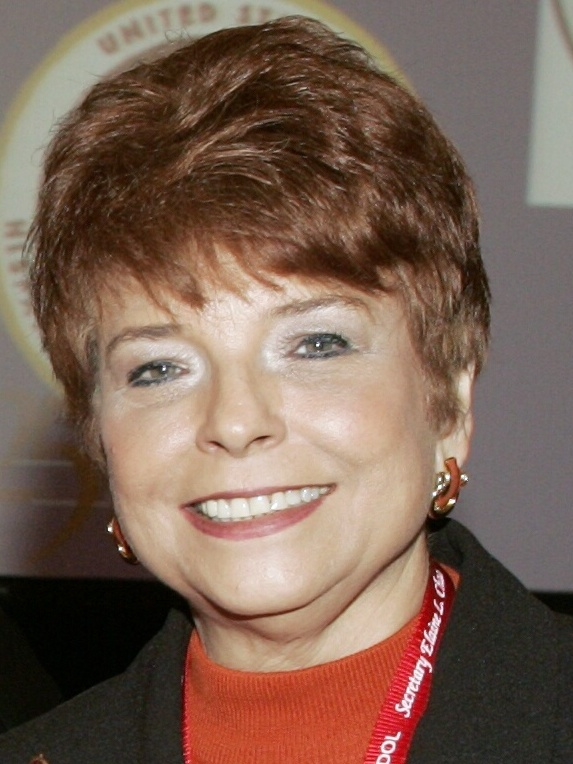

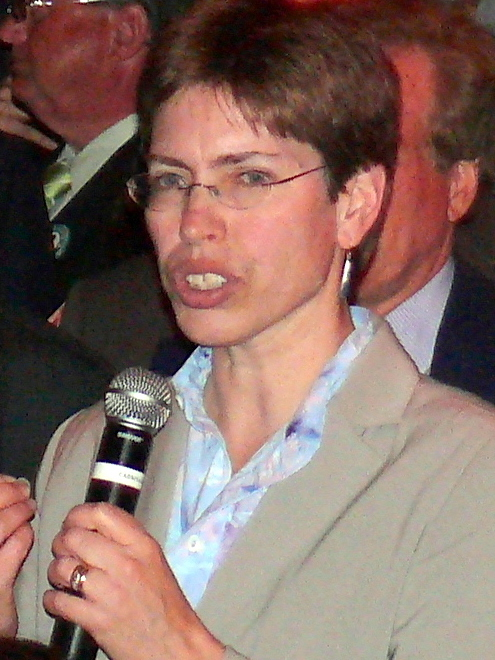
Nominee	Judy Baar Topinka	Sheila Simon
Party	Republican	Democratic
Popular vote	1,775,983	1,636,593
Percentage	49.56%	45.67%
- County results Topinka: 40–50% 50–60% 60–70% 70–80% Simon: 40–50% 50–60% 60–70%
State Comptroller before election
Judy Baar Topinka
Republican
Elected State Comptroller
Judy Baar Topinka
Republican

Incumbent Republican Comptroller Judy Baar Topinka ran for re-election to a second term in office. As of 2022, this was the last time a Republican was elected Comptroller.

=== Democratic primary ===
==== Candidates ====
===== Declared =====
- Sheila Simon, Lieutenant Governor of Illinois

==== Results ====
Democratic primary results
Party	Candidate	Votes	%
Democratic	Sheila Simon	411,623	100.0
Total votes		411,623	100.0

=== Republican primary ===
==== Candidates ====
===== Declared =====
- Judy Baar Topinka, Illinois Comptroller

===== Withdrew =====
- William J. Kelly, political activist, columnist, and candidate for Illinois Comptroller in 2010

==== Results ====
Republican primary results
Party	Candidate	Votes	%
Republican	Judy Baar Topinka (incumbent)	680,768	100.0
Total votes		680,768	100.0

=== General election ===
==== Polling ====
Poll source	Date(s) administered	Sample size	Margin of error	Judy Baar Topinka (R)	Sheila Simon (D)	Julie Fox (L)	Other	Undecided
APC Research	October 16–21, 2014	800	± 3.5%	49%	31%	8%	1%	11%
Communication Express	September 30, 2014	1,167	± 2.87%	53%	31%	5%	—	11%
We Ask America	September 17, 2014	1,071	± 3.1%	55%	32%	6%	—	8%
We Ask America	September 2, 2014	1,064	± 3%	51%	32%	8%	—	9%
We Ask America	July 31, 2014	1,005	± 3.1%	51%	32%	—	—	17%
We Ask America	June 17, 2014	1,021	± 3.07%	48%	37%	—	—	15%
We Ask America	April 27, 2014	—	± 3.14%	51%	38%	—	—	11%
We Ask America	April 21, 2014	—	± 3.21%	56%	29%	—	—	15%

==== Results ====
Illinois State Comptroller election, 2014
Party	Candidate	Votes	%	±%
Republican	Judy Baar Topinka (incumbent)	1,775,983	49.56%	−3.06%
Democratic	Sheila Simon	1,636,593	45.67%	+4.79%
Libertarian	Julie Fox	170,534	4.76%	+1.45%
Write-in		176	0.01%	N/A
Total votes		3,583,286	100.0	
Republican hold				

==== Aftermath ====
Topinka died on December 10, 2014. Governor Pat Quinn appointed Jerry Stermer to serve out the remainder of her term. A special election was held for the office in 2016.

== Treasurer ==
2014 Illinois State Treasurer election
- November 4, 2014
- Turnout: 47.14%
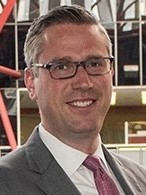

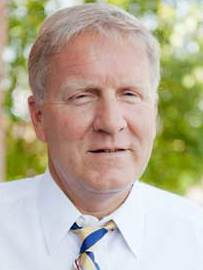
Nominee	Mike Frerichs	Tom Cross
Party	Democratic	Republican
Popular vote	1,694,885	1,685,659
Percentage	48.05%	47.79%
- County results Frerichs: 40–50% 50–60% 60–70% Cross: 40–50% 50–60% 60–70% 70–80%
Treasurer before election
Dan Rutherford
Republican
Elected Treasurer
Mike Frerichs
Democratic

Incumbent Republican Treasurer Dan Rutherford did not run for re-election to a second term in office. He instead ran unsuccessfully for the Republican nomination for governor.

=== Republican primary ===
==== Candidates ====
===== Declared =====
- Tom Cross, minority leader of the Illinois House of Representatives
- Bob Grogan, DuPage County auditor

===== Withdrew =====
- Michael Scott Carter, financial executive
- Bob Schillerstrom, former chairman of the DuPage County Board and candidate for governor in 2010

===== Declined =====
- Darin LaHood, state senator
- Dan Rutherford, Illinois Treasurer

==== Polling ====
Poll source	Date(s) administered	Sample size	Margin of error	Tom Cross	Bob Grogan	Bob Schillerstrom	Other	Undecided
Battleground Polling	November 3–11, 2013	535	± 3.97%	27%	13%	—	—	60%
Battleground Polling	May 20–27, 2013	400	± 4.8%	—	21%	18%	61%	—

==== Results ====
Republican primary results
Party	Candidate	Votes	%
Republican	Tom Cross	397,691	57.4
Republican	Bob Grogan	295,682	42.6
Total votes		693,373	100.0

=== Democratic primary ===
==== Candidates ====
===== Declared =====
- Mike Frerichs, state senator and former Champaign County auditor

==== Results ====
Democratic primary results
Party	Candidate	Votes	%
Democratic	Mike Frerichs	385,585	100.0
Total votes		385,585	100.0

=== General election ===
==== Polling ====
Poll source	Date(s) administered	Sample size	Margin of error	Tom Cross (R)	Mike Frerichs (D)	Matthew Skopek (L)	Other	Undecided
McKeon & Associates	October 28, 2014	823	± 3.9%	35%	32%	7%	—	26%
APC Research	October 16–21, 2014	800	± 3.5%	38%	34%	7%	2%	20%
We Ask America	October 7, 2014	1,083	± 2.98%	40%	39%	6%	—	15%
Communication Express	September 30, 2014	1,134	± 2.87%	44%	34%	3%	—	19%
We Ask America	September 17, 2014	1,071	± 3.1%	43%	35%	7%	—	15%
We Ask America	September 4, 2014	1,014	± 3.08%	43%	37%	6%	—	14%
We Ask America	July 31, 2014	1,005	± 3.1%	45%	33%	—	—	21%
We Ask America	June 17, 2014	1,021	± 3.07%	43%	34%	—	—	23%
We Ask America	April 27, 2014	—	± 3.14%	41%	37%	—	—	22%
We Ask America	April 21, 2014	—	± 3.21%	33%	20%	—	—	47%

==== Results ====
Illinois State Treasurer election, 2014
Party	Candidate	Votes	%	±%
Democratic	Mike Frerichs	1,694,884	48.05%	+2.79%
Republican	Tom Cross	1,685,659	47.79%	−1.89%
Libertarian	Matthew Skopek	146,654	4.16%	+2.27%
Total votes		3,527,197	100.0%	
Democratic gain from Republican				

== State Senate ==
One-third of the seats of the Illinois Senate were up for election in 2014.

== State House of Representatives ==
All of Illinois' 118 seats in the Illinois House of Representatives were up for election in 2014.

No seats flipped in this election, retaining the composition at 71 Democrats and 47 Republicans.

== Judicial elections ==
Judicial elections were held, which consisted of both partisan and retention elections, including those one seat of the Supreme Court of Illinois for ten seats in the Illinois Appellate Court.

== Ballot measures ==
Illinois voters voted on a two ballot measures in 2014. In order to be approved, the measures required either 60% support among those specifically voting on the amendment or 50% support among all ballots cast in the elections.

=== Illinois Crime Victims' Bill of Rights ===
Illinois voters approved the Illinois Crime Victims' Bill of Rights (commonly known as "Marsy's Law"), a legislatively referred constitutional amendment.

==== Results ====
Illinois Crime Victims' Bill of Rights
Option	Votes	% of votes on measure	% of all ballots cast
Yes	2,653,475	78.4	72.10
No	728,991	21.6	19.81
Total votes	3,382,466	100	91.90
Voter turnout	45.07%		

=== Illinois Right to Vote Amendment ===
Illinois voters approved the Illinois Right to Vote Amendment, a legislatively referred constitutional amendment. The amendment was designed to provide that no person shall be denied the right to register to vote or cast a ballot in an election based on race, color, ethnicity, language, national origin, religion, sex, sexual orientation or income.

Both proponents and opponents argued that the legislation was intended to block Voter Identification laws from being passed in Illinois.

The measure added a Section 8 to Article III of the Constitution of Illinois which reads,

No person shall be denied the right to register to vote or to cast a ballot in an election based on race, color, ethnicity, status as a member of a language minority, national origin, religion, sex, sexual orientation, or income.

==== Results ====
Illinois Right to Vote Amendment
Option	Votes	% of votes on measure	% of all ballots cast
Yes	2,350,114	70.99	63.85
No	960,181	29.01	26.09
Total votes	3,310,295	100	89.94
Voter turnout	44.24%		

== Local elections ==
Local elections were held. These included county elections, such as the Cook County elections.
