= 2002 Illinois elections =

- November 5, 2002
- Turnout: 51.86%

Elections were held in Illinois on Tuesday, November 5, 2002. Primary elections were held on March 19, 2002.

The Democratic Party made gains in these elections, while the Republican Party conversely saw losses. The Democratic Party retained their control of the State House and flipped control of the State Senate. The Democratic Party also won the Governorship and Lieutenant Governorship in their combined election, ending 26 years of Republican control of the state's executive branch. In addition, among the other four statewide elected offices, the Democratic Party retained their hold of two (Secretary of State and Comptroller), while flipping another (Attorney General). This left Illinois Treasurer Judy Baar Topinka as the sole remaining Republican holder of a statewide office.

The losses for Republicans continued a decline of fortunes that had taken place in the state of Illinois over the last several elections for the party, which previously had held all statewide elected offices and both chambers of the Illinois General Assembly in the mid-1990s (following the 1994 elections).

== Election information ==
2002 was a midterm election year in the United States.

=== Turnout ===
==== Primary election ====
For the primary election, turnout was 32.84%, with 2,321,875 votes cast.

Turnout by county

County	Registration	Votes cast	Turnout
Adams	42,020	15,498	36.88%
Alexander	8,063	2,530	31.38%
Bond	10,818	2,654	24.53%
Boone	26,285	7,072	26.91%
Brown	3,363	1,127	33.51%
Bureau	25,633	8,007	31.24%
Calhoun	3,589	1,222	34.05%
Carroll	11,775	4,115	34.95%
Cass	10,185	3,159	31.02%
Champaign	110,734	28,639	25.86%
Christian	22,647	7,450	32.9%
Clark	11,994	4,368	36.42%
Clay	10,014	1,795	17.92%
Clinton	24,517	4,433	18.08%
Coles	28,732	7,577	26.37%
Cook (Note: For more on Cook County primary election turnout, see 2002 Cook County, Illinois elections#Primary election)	2,691,821	987,678	36.69%
Crawford	14,989	4,376	29.19%
Cumberland	7,758	2,832	36.5%
DeKalb	47,633	16,703	35.07%
DeWitt	11,843	4,434	37.44%
Douglas	12,100	3,746	30.96%
DuPage	520,682	185,874	35.7%
Edgar	13,052	4,919	37.69%
Edwards	5,146	1,736	33.73%
Effingham	22,548	5,835	25.88%
Fayette	13,916	3,913	28.12%
Ford	9,137	2,933	32.1%
Franklin	29,257	8,839	30.21%
Fulton	24,677	6,392	25.9%
Gallatin	4,729	3,262	68.98%
Greene	9,377	3,506	37.39%
Grundy	24,727	6,137	24.82%
Hamilton	6,252	2,477	39.62%
Hancock	13,238	4,206	31.77%
Hardin	3,681	1,793	48.71%
Henderson	5,398	1,636	30.31%
Henry	38,164	7,348	19.25%
Iroquois	19,632	6,207	31.62%
Jackson	55,122	7,531	13.66%
Jasper	7,156	1,790	25.01%
Jefferson	23,777	7,232	30.42%
Jersey	13,844	3,677	26.56%
Jo Daviess	15,029	4,118	27.4%
Johnson	7,472	2,877	38.5%
Kane	219,721	75,413	34.32%
Kankakee	60,747	15,803	26.01%
Kendall	38,687	15,391	39.78%
Knox	36,934	8,655	23.43%
Lake	337,435	126,285	37.42%
LaSalle	73,827	17,230	23.34%
Lawrence	10,980	3,883	35.36%
Lee	21,457	6,055	28.22%
Livingston	22,260	8,809	39.57%
Logan	19,182	7,718	40.24%
Macon	77,308	20,791	26.89%
Macoupin	34,859	7,363	21.12%
Madison	159,965	42,660	26.67%
Marion	29,583	9,774	33.04%
Marshall	8,877	3,203	36.08%
Mason	10,421	4,058	38.94%
Massac	10,796	3,005	27.83%
McDonough	23,433	6,747	28.79%
McHenry	165,112	42,719	25.87%
McLean	89,295	25,618	28.69%
Menard	8,378	4,079	48.69%
Mercer	12,946	2,824	21.81%
Monroe	20,225	3,496	17.29%
Montgomery	18,314	4,989	27.24%
Morgan	22,435	8,775	39.11%
Moultrie	8,409	3,463	41.18%
Ogle	33,254	11,170	33.59%
Peoria	113,954	30,031	26.35%
Perry	15,412	6,022	39.07%
Piatt	11,668	3,880	33.25%
Pike	12,749	3,976	31.19%
Pope	3,648	1,662	45.56%
Pulaski	6,079	2,135	35.12%
Putnam	4,547	1,302	28.63%
Randolph	24,740	8,101	32.74%
Richland	11,966	1,980	16.55%
Rock Island	106,133	22,203	20.92%
Saline	16,498	6,421	38.92%
Sangamon	128,932	50,869	39.45%
Schuyler	6,369	1,549	24.32%
Scott	3,924	1,708	43.53%
Shelby	14,622	4,514	30.87%
Stark	4,608	1,156	25.09%
St. Clair	170,737	33,660	19.71%
Stephenson	31,490	11,045	35.07%
Tazewell	90,205	23,669	26.24%
Union	13,263	4,029	30.38%
Vermilion	50,969	12,820	25.15%
Wabash	9,998	1,638	16.38%
Warren	12,694	4,381	34.51%
Washington	10,536	2,603	24.71%
Wayne	12,333	5,451	44.2%
White	11,493	4,968	43.23%
Whiteside	39,434	8,351	21.18%
Will	293,864	97,410	33.15%
Williamson	41,787	11,195	26.79%
Winnebago	174,926	51,561	29.48%
Woodford	23,331	7,956	34.1%
Total	7,070,275	2,321,875	32.84%

==== General election ====
For the general election, turnout was 51.86%, with 3,653,060 votes cast.

Turnout by county

County	Registration	Votes cast	Turnout%
Adams	42,861	25,512	59.52%
Alexander	8,749	3,451	39.44%
Bond	10,071	6,120	60.77%
Boone	24,846	11,691	47.05%
Brown	3,416	2,316	67.8%
Bureau	24,322	13,889	57.1%
Calhoun	3,589	2,374	66.15%
Carroll	11,878	6,153	51.8%
Cass	9,023	5,629	62.39%
Champaign	99,225	54,302	54.73%
Christian	22,506	12,593	55.95%
Clark	11,905	6,721	56.46%
Clay	10,310	5,551	53.84%
Clinton	25,110	12,800	50.98%
Coles	30,541	15,406	50.44%
Cook (Note: For more on Cook County general election turnout, see 2002 Cook County, Illinois elections#General election)	2,730,878	1,423,403	52.12%
Crawford	15,408	7,636	49.56%
Cumberland	7,947	4,299	54.1%
DeKalb	48,745	24,800	50.88%
DeWitt	11,987	5,583	46.58%
Douglas	12,422	6,231	50.16%
DuPage	491,151	274,520	55.89%
Edgar	12,476	8,155	65.37%
Edwards	5,243	2,888	55.08%
Effingham	20,533	13,155	64.07%
Fayette	14,628	8,232	56.28%
Ford	8,642	4,897	56.67%
Franklin	29,655	14,907	50.27%
Fulton	25,195	13,291	52.75%
Gallatin	4,710	3,269	69.41%
Greene	8,530	5,087	59.64%
Grundy	24,689	13,719	55.57%
Hamilton	6,371	4,399	69.05%
Hancock	13,399	8,327	62.15%
Hardin	3,793	2,488	65.59%
Henderson	5,414	3,366	62.17%
Henry	35,931	17,135	47.69%
Iroquois	18,998	11,078	58.31%
Jackson	35,670	16,755	46.97%
Jasper	7,228	4,230	58.52%
Jefferson	24,667	13,347	54.11%
Jersey	14,015	7,947	56.7%
Jo Daviess	15,387	8,641	56.16%
Johnson	7,669	5,113	66.67%
Kane	225,878	109,331	48.4%
Kankakee	56,797	30,145	53.07%
Kendall	44,165	20,874	47.26%
Knox	37,687	19,062	50.58%
Lake	335,313	176,597	52.67%
LaSalle	70,741	38,100	53.86%
Lawrence	11,114	5,622	50.58%
Lee	22,247	12,120	54.48%
Livingston	22,455	12,263	54.61%
Logan	19,142	11,476	59.95%
Macon	76,170	38,488	50.53%
Macoupin	35,024	16,443	46.95%
Madison	165,301	79,631	48.17%
Marion	30,353	13,595	44.79%
Marshall	8,990	5,122	56.97%
Mason	10,659	6,137	57.58%
Massac	10,928	5,569	50.96%
McDonough	18,451	11,073	60.01%
McHenry	169,530	77,529	45.73%
McLean	89,651	43,349	48.35%
Menard	8,584	5,769	67.21%
Mercer	13,080	7,119	54.43%
Monroe	20,886	10,711	51.28%
Montgomery	21,021	10,613	50.49%
Morgan	22,799	12,526	54.94%
Moultrie	8,630	5,349	61.98%
Ogle	34,396	15,738	45.76%
Peoria	111,963	56,206	50.2%
Perry	15,548	8,953	57.58%
Piatt	11,768	6,515	55.36%
Pike	11,851	7,289	61.51%
Pope	3,673	2,159	58.78%
Pulaski	6,066	3,124	51.5%
Putnam	4,670	2,746	58.8%
Randolph	25,105	12,111	48.24%
Richland	12,315	6,405	52.01%
Rock Island	96,573	43,682	45.23%
Saline	16,703	10,313	61.74%
Sangamon	124,339	82,243	66.14%
Schuyler	5,625	3,829	68.07%
Scott	3,752	2,485	66.23%
Shelby	15,011	8,579	57.15%
Stark	4,702	2,355	50.09%
St. Clair	169,173	69,684	41.19%
Stephenson	29,748	14,486	48.7%
Tazewell	90,507	41,870	46.26%
Union	15,721	7,059	44.9%
Vermilion	49,556	24,889	50.22%
Wabash	10,102	4,507	44.61%
Warren	12,861	6,394	49.72%
Washington	10,783	6,316	58.57%
Wayne	12,531	7,800	62.25%
White	11,465	7,437	64.87%
Whiteside	36,423	17,379	47.71%
Will	295,501	150,153	50.81%
Williamson	40,870	22,082	54.03%
Winnebago	175,101	79,235	45.25%
Woodford	23,826	13,018	54.64%
Total	7,043,557	3,653,060	51.86%

== Federal elections ==
=== United States Senate ===
Incumbent Democratic United States Senator Dick Durbin won reelection to a second term.

=== United States House ===
Illinois had lost one seat in the reapportionment following the 2000 United States census. All 19 of Illinois' remaining seats in the United States House of Representatives were up for election in 2002.

Before the election, Democrats and Republicans each held 10 seats from Illinois. In 2002, Republicans won 10 seats while Democrats won 9.

== State elections ==
=== Governor and Lieutenant Governor ===
2002 Illinois gubernatorial election
- November 5, 2002
- Turnout: 50.05%
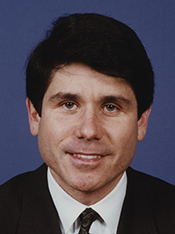

Nominee	Rod Blagojevich	Jim Ryan
Party	Democratic	Republican
Running mate	Pat Quinn	Carl Hawkinson
Popular vote	1,847,040	1,594,961
Percentage	52.2%	45.1%
- County results Blagojevich: 40–50% 50–60% 60–70% Ryan: 40–50% 50–60% 60–70% 70–80%
Governor before election
George Ryan
Republican
Elected Governor
Rod Blagojevich
Democratic

Incumbent Governor George Ryan, a Republican plagued by scandals, did not seek reelection. Democrat Rod Blagojevich was elected to succeed him.

Governor/Lieutenant Governor election
Party	Candidate	Votes	%
Democratic	Rod Blagojevich / Pat Quinn	1,847,040	52.19
Republican	Jim Ryan / Carl Hawkinson	1,594,961	45.07
Libertarian	Cal Skinner	73,794	2.09
Independent	Marisellis Brown	23,089	0.65
Write-in	Peter Dale Kauss	8	0.00
Total votes		3,538,891	100

=== Attorney General ===
2002 Illinois Attorney General election
- November 5, 2002
- Turnout: 49.68%
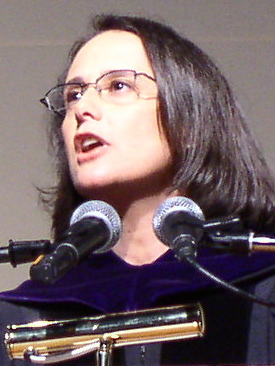

Nominee	Lisa Madigan	Joe Birkett
Party	Democratic	Republican
Popular vote	1,762,949	1,648,003
Percentage	50.39%	47.10%
- County results Madigan: 40–50% 50–60% 60–70% Birkett: 40–50% 50–60% 60–70%
Attorney General before election
Jim Ryan
Republican
Elected Attorney General
Lisa Madigan
Democratic

Incumbent Attorney General Jim Ryan, a Republican, did not seek a third term, instead opting to run for governor. Democrat Lisa Madigan was elected to succeed him.

==== Democratic primary ====
2002 Illinois Attorney General Democratic primary debate
No.	Date	Host	Moderator	Link	Democratic	Democratic
Key: P Participant A Absent N Not invited I Invited W Withdrawn						
Key: P Participant A Absent N Not invited I Invited W Withdrawn					Lisa Madigan	John Schmidt
1	Feb. 15, 2002	City Club of Chicago	Paul Green	YouTube	P	P

Attorney General Democratic primary
Party	Candidate	Votes	%
Democratic	Lisa Madigan	698,250	58.21
Democratic	John Schmidt	501,190	41.79
Total votes		1,199,440	100

Democratic primary by county Map legend: Schmidt 50–60%; Madigan 50–60%; Madigan 60–70%; Madigan 70–80%; Madigan 80-90%

==== Republican primary ====
Attorney General Republican primary
Party	Candidate	Votes	%
Republican	Joe Birkett	527,160	64.04
Republican	Bob Coleman	295,958	35.96
Total votes		823,118	100

==== General election ====
Poll source	Date(s) administered	Sample size (Note: Key: A – all adults RV – registered voters LV – likely voters V – unclear)	Margin of error	Lisa Madigan (D)	Joe Birkett (R)	Gary Shilts (L)	Other / Undecided
SurveyUSA	October 28–30, 2002	510 (LV)	± 4.4%	48%	43%	5%	5%

2002 Illinois Attorney General debate
No.	Date	Host	Moderator	Link	Republican	Democratic
Key: P Participant A Absent N Not invited I Invited W Withdrawn						
Key: P Participant A Absent N Not invited I Invited W Withdrawn					Joe Birkett	Lisa Madigan
1	Oct. 1, 2002	City Club of Chicago	Paul Green	YouTube	P	P

Attorney General election
Party	Candidate	Votes	%
Democratic	Lisa Madigan	1,762,949	50.39
Republican	Joe Birkett	1,648,003	47.10
Libertarian	Gary L. Shilts	87,949	2.51
Total votes		3,498,901	100

=== Secretary of State ===
2002 Illinois Secretary of State election
- November 5, 2002
- Turnout: 49.99%
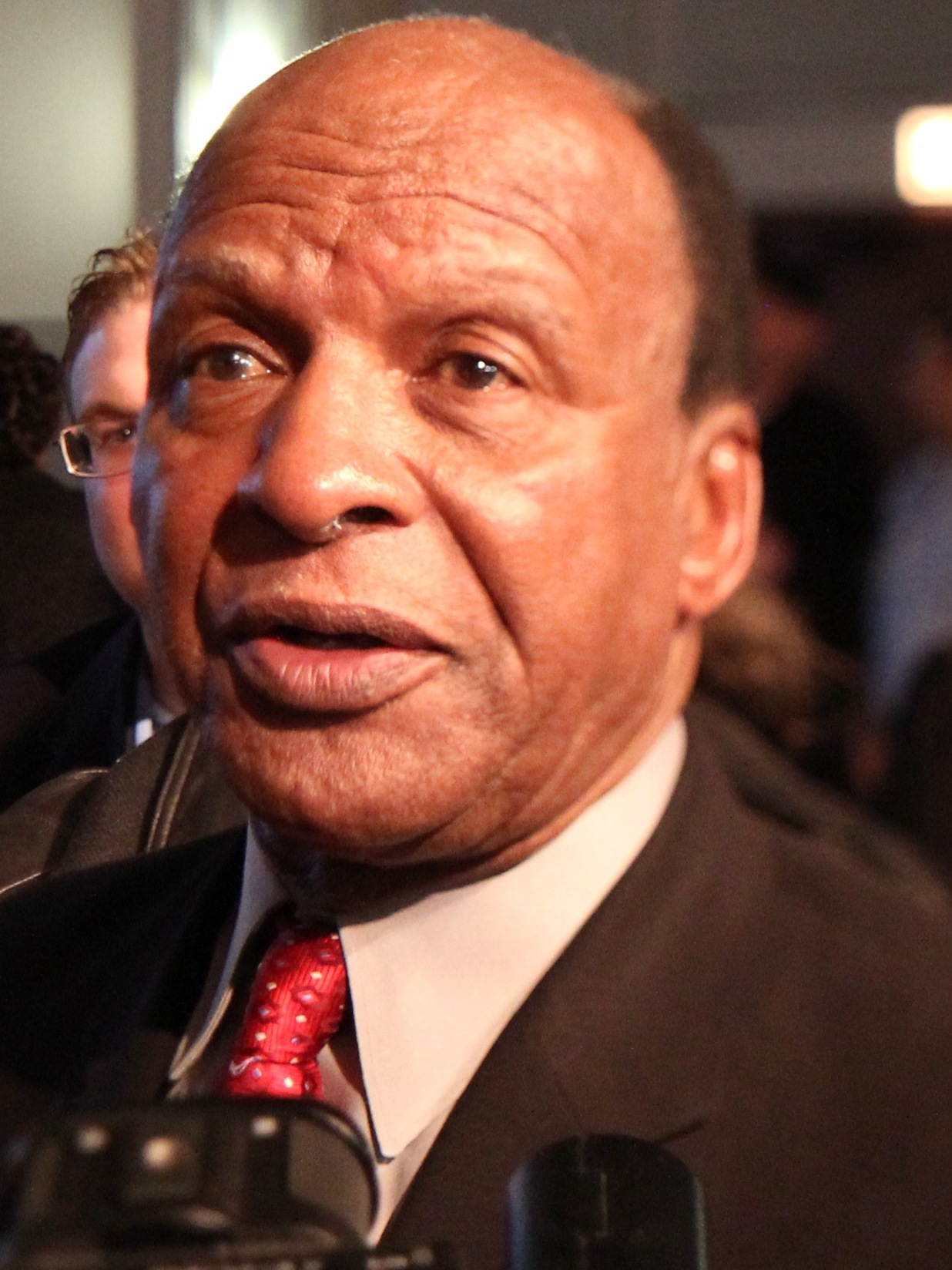

Nominee	Jesse White	Kris O'Rourke Cohn
Party	Democratic	Republican
Popular vote	2,390,181	1,051,672
Percentage	67.89%	28.87%
- County results White: 50–60% 60–70% 70–80%
Secretary of State before election
Jesse White
Democratic
Elected Secretary of State
Jesse White
Democratic

Incumbent Secretary of State Jesse White, a Democrat, won reelection to a second term in office.

==== Democratic primary ====
Secretary of State Democratic primary
Party	Candidate	Votes	%
Democratic	Jesse White (incumbent)	1,104,041	100
Total votes		1,104,041	100

==== Republican primary ====
Secretary of State Republican primary
Party	Candidate	Votes	%
Republican	Kris O'Rourke Cohn	725,591	100
Total votes		725,591	100

==== General election ====
White carried all of Illinois' 102 counties.

Secretary of State election
Party	Candidate	Votes	%
Democratic	Jesse White (incumbent)	2,390,181	67.89
Republican	Kris O'Rourke Cohn	1,051,672	28.87
Libertarian	Matt Beauchamp	78,830	2.24
Total votes		3,520,683	100

=== Comptroller ===
2002 Illinois State Comptroller election
- November 5, 2002
- Turnout: 48.32%
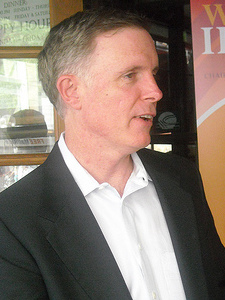

Nominee	Daniel Hynes	Thomas Jefferson Ramsdell
Party	Democratic	Republican
Popular vote	2,150,425	1,108,984
Percentage	63.18%	32.58%
- County results Hynes: 40–50% 50–60% 60–70% 70–80% Ramsdell: 40–50% 50–60%
State Comptroller before election
Daniel Hynes
Democratic
Elected State Comptroller
Daniel Hynes
Democratic

Incumbent Comptroller Daniel Hynes, a Democrat, was reelected to a second term.

==== Democratic primary ====
Comptroller Democratic primary
Party	Candidate	Votes	%
Democratic	Daniel Hynes (incumbent)	1,002,585	100
Total votes		1,002,585	100

==== Republican primary ====
Comptroller Republican primary
Party	Candidate	Votes	%
Republican	Thomas Jefferson Ramsdell	717,379	100
Total votes		717,379	100

==== General election ====
2002 Illinois Comptroller debate
No.	Date	Host	Moderator	Link	Democratic	Republican
Key: P Participant A Absent N Not invited I Invited W Withdrawn						
Key: P Participant A Absent N Not invited I Invited W Withdrawn					Daniel Hynes	Thomas Ramsdell
1	Oct. 18, 2002	City Club of Chicago	Paul Green	YouTube	P	P

Comptroller election
Party	Candidate	Votes	%
Democratic	Daniel Hynes (incumbent)	2,150,425	63.18
Republican	Thomas Jefferson Ramsdell	1,108,984	40.88
Libertarian	Julie Fox	144,066	4.23
Total votes		3,403,475	100

=== Treasurer ===
2002 Illinois State Treasurer election
- November 5, 2002
- Turnout: 49.15%
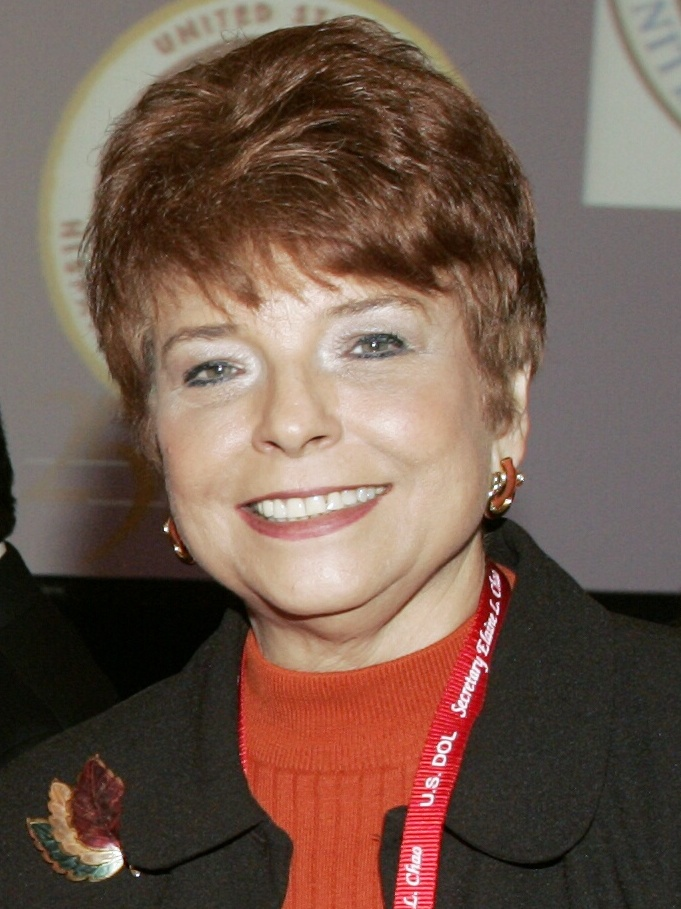

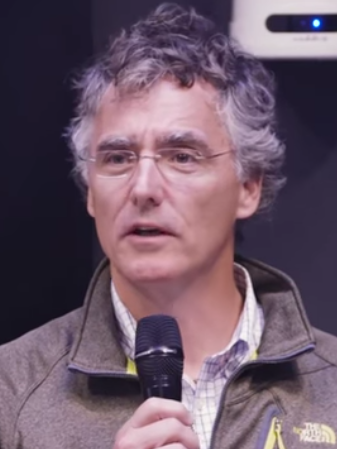
Nominee	Judy Baar Topinka	Tom Dart
Party	Republican	Democratic
Popular vote	1,896,020	1,499,055
Percentage	54.77%	43.30%
- County results Topinka: 40–50% 50–60% 60–70% 70–80% Dart: 40–50% 50–60% 60–70%
Treasurer before election
Judy Baar Topinka
Republican
Elected Treasurer
Judy Baar Topinka
Republican

Incumbent Treasurer Judy Baar Topinka, a Republican, was reelected to a third term.

==== Democratic primary ====
Treasurer Democratic primary
Party	Candidate	Votes	%
Democratic	Thomas J. Dart	966,421	100
Total votes		966,421	100

==== Republican primary ====
Treasurer Republican primary
Party	Candidate	Votes	%
Republican	Judy Baar Topinka (incumbent)	773,416	100
Total votes		773,416	100

==== General election ====
2002 Illinois Treasurer debate
No.	Date	Host	Moderator	Link	Republican	Democratic
Key: P Participant A Absent N Not invited I Invited W Withdrawn						
Key: P Participant A Absent N Not invited I Invited W Withdrawn					Judy Baar Topinka	Tom Dart
1	Oct. 16, 2002	City Club of Chicago	Paul Green	YouTube	P	P

Treasurer election
Party	Candidate	Votes	%
Republican	Judy Baar Topinka (incumbent)	1,896,020	54.77
Democratic	Thomas J. Dart	1,499,055	43.30
Libertarian	Rhys Read	66,593	1.92
Total votes		3,461,668	100

=== State Senate ===
2002 Illinois Senate election
- November 5, 2002

59 of 59 seats in the Illinois Senate 30 seats needed for a majority
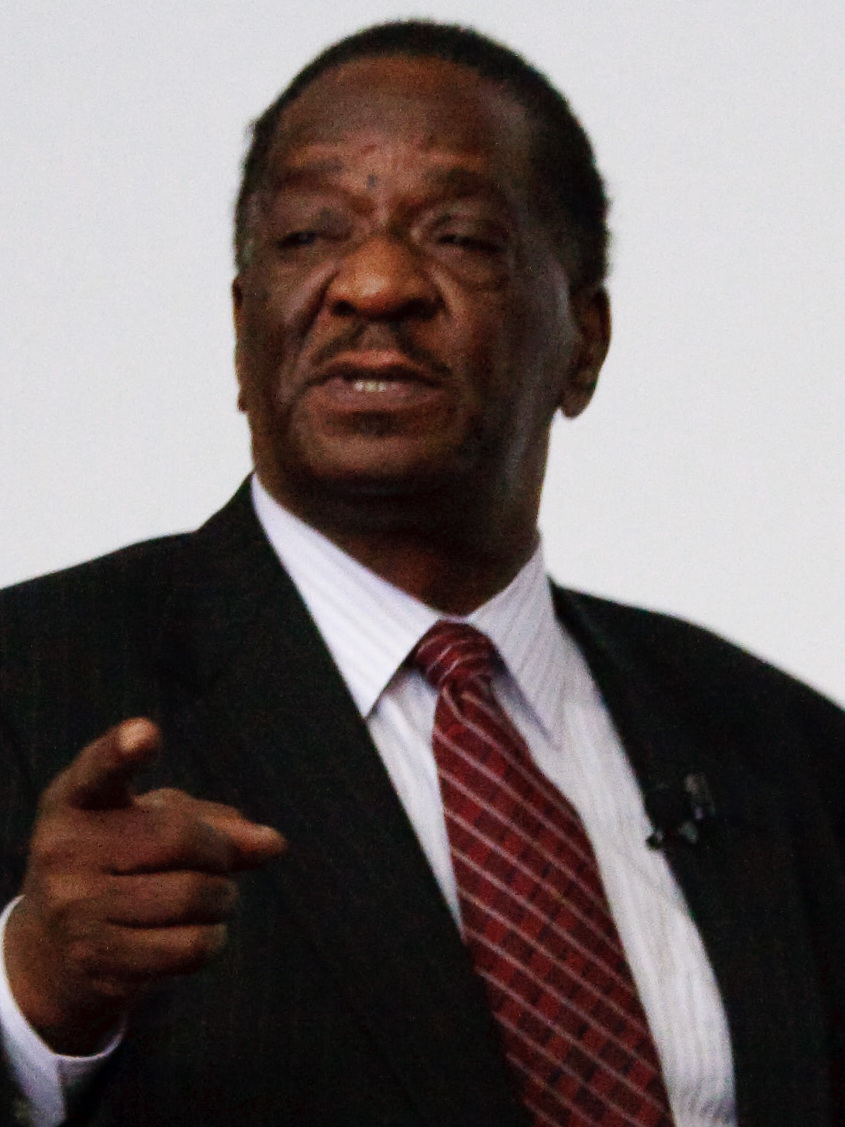

	Majority party	Minority party	Third party
Leader	Emil Jones	James Philip	N/A
Party	Democratic	Republican	Independent
Leader's seat	14th	23rd	N/A
Last election	27	32	0
Seats won	32	26	1
Seat change	▲5	▼6	▲1
- Results: Democratic gain Republican gain Independent gain Democratic hold Republican hold
President before election
James Philip
Republican
Elected President
Emil Jones
Democratic

All 59 of the seats of the Illinois Senate were up for election in 2002, as this election followed a redistricting. Control of the Illinois Senate was flipped from Republican to Democratic. Republicans had been in control of the State Senate since 1993, having captured a majority from the 1992 election.

=== State House of Representatives ===
2002 Illinois House of Representatives election
- November 5, 2002

All 118 seats in the Illinois House of Representatives 60 seats needed for a majority
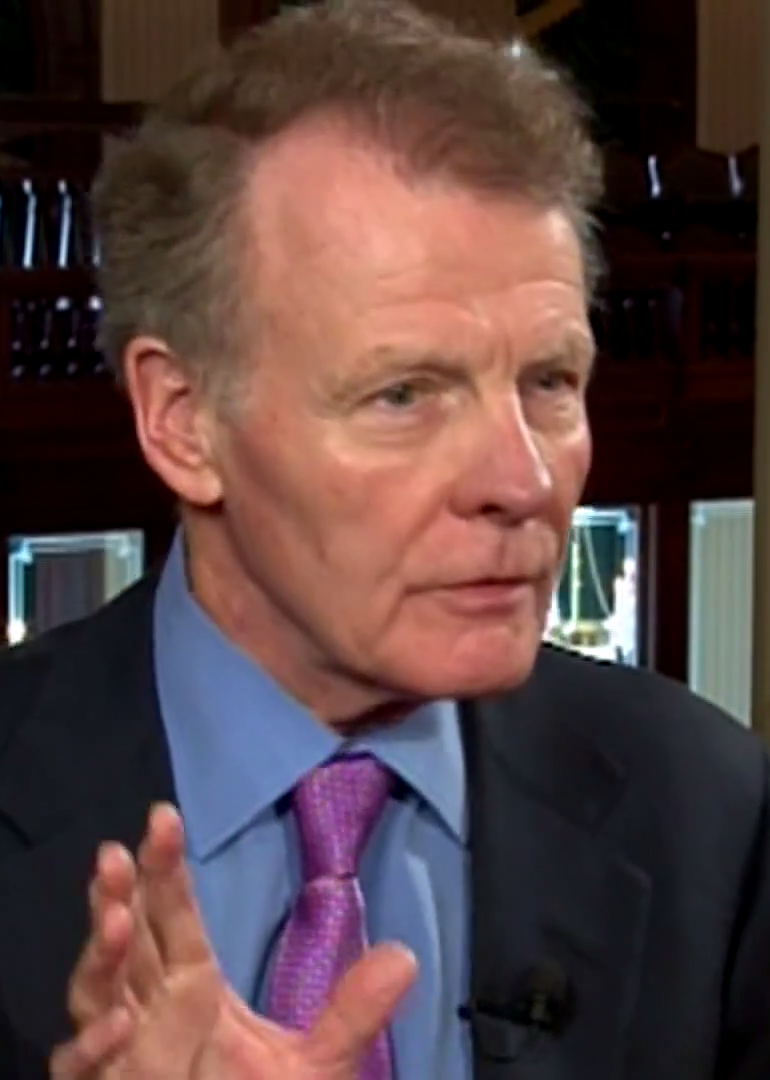

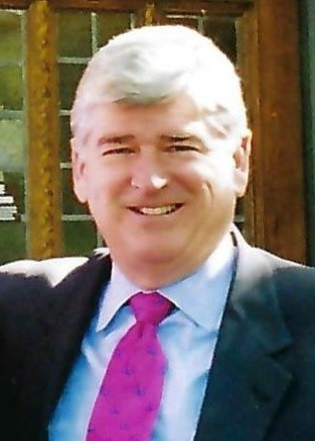
	Majority party	Minority party
Leader	Michael Madigan	Lee Daniels (retired)
Party	Democratic	Republican
Leader's seat	22nd	46th
Last election	62	56
Seats won	66	52
Seat change	▲4	▼4
- Results: Democratic gain Democratic hold Republican hold
Speaker before election
Michael Madigan
Democratic
Speaker-Elect
Michael Madigan
Democratic

All of the seats in the Illinois House of Representatives were up for election in 2002. Democrats retained control of the House, which they had held since 1997, having won a majority in the 1996 election. Republican Leader Lee Daniels had resigned as Chair of the Illinois GOP in July, but maintained his position as Minority Leader in the House until after the 2002 elections. Madigan continued as Speaker and Democratic chair after the elections.

=== Judicial elections ===
Multiple judicial positions were up for election in 2002.

== Local elections ==
Local elections were held. These included county elections, such as the Cook County elections.
