= Senator Becker =

Senator Becker may refer to:

- George Loomis Becker (1829–1904), Minnesota State Senate
- Josh Becker (politician) (born 1969), California State Senate
- Leonard F. Becker (1920–1991), Illinois State Senate
- Randi Becker (born 1948), Washington State Senate
- Richard L. Becker (1905–2004), Kansas State Senate
- Richard M. Becker (1931–2007), Kansas State Senate
- Vaneta Becker (born 1949), Indiana State Senate
