= Judy Baar Topinka =

American politician (1944–2014)

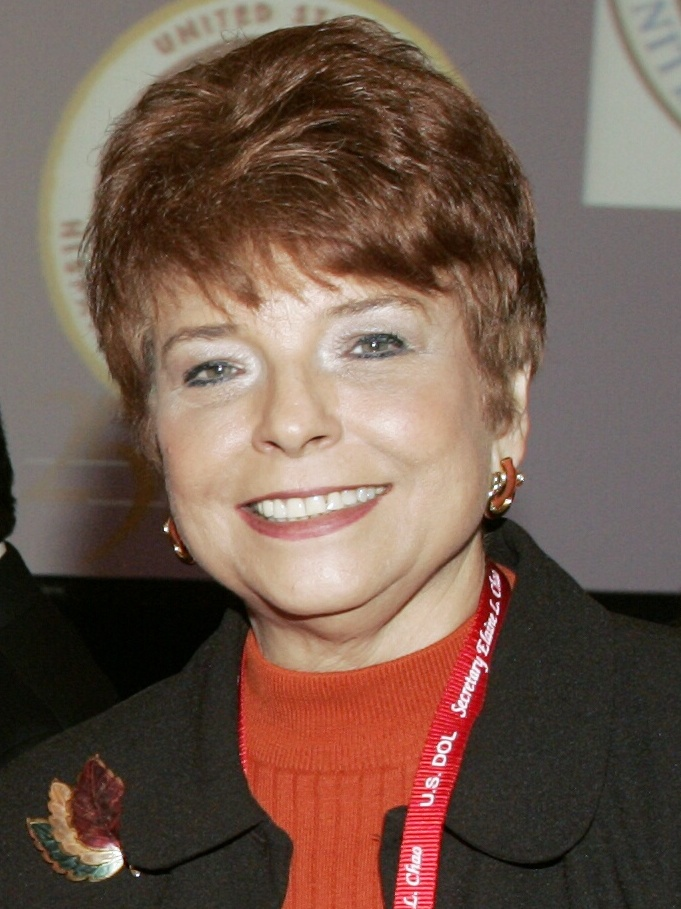
- Topinka in 2004

7th Comptroller of Illinois
- In office January 10, 2011 – December 10, 2014
- Governor: Pat Quinn
- Preceded by: Daniel Hynes
- Succeeded by: Jerry Stermer

71st Treasurer of Illinois
- In office January 9, 1995 – January 8, 2007
- Governor: Jim Edgar; George Ryan; Rod Blagojevich
- Preceded by: Pat Quinn
- Succeeded by: Alexi Giannoulias

Chair of the Illinois Republican Party
- In office 2002–2005
- Preceded by: Gary MacDougal
- Succeeded by: Andrew McKenna

Member of the Illinois Senate from the 22nd district
- In office January 1985 – January 1995
- Preceded by: Leonard F. Becker
- Succeeded by: Thomas J. Walsh

Member of the Illinois House of Representatives from the 43rd district
- In office January 1983 – January 1985
- Preceded by: George Ryan; Ray A. Christensen; Edward McBroom
- Succeeded by: Jack L. Kubik

Member of the Illinois House of Representatives from the 7th district
- In office January 1981 – January 1983 Serving with John S. Kociolko, Robert Pechous
- Preceded by: Henry Klosak; Paul J. Matula
- Succeeded by: John Cullerton

Personal details
- Born: Judy Baar; January 16, 1944 Riverside, Illinois, U.S.
- Died: December 10, 2014 (aged 70) Berwyn, Illinois, U.S.
- Party: Republican
- Spouse: Joe Topinka (m. 1965; div. 1981)
- Children: 1
- Education: Northwestern University (BA)

Judy Baar Topinka (née Baar; January 16, 1944 – December 10, 2014) was an American politician and member of the Republican Party from the U.S. State of Illinois.

Originally a journalist, Topinka served in the Illinois House of Representatives from 1981 to 1985 and in the Illinois Senate from 1985 to 1995. She was elected to three terms as Illinois State Treasurer, serving from 1995 to 2007. She was the first woman to become state treasurer, the first to be elected to three consecutive terms, and the first Republican to hold the post in more than 32 years. During her last term as treasurer, she was the only Republican to hold statewide elected office in Illinois. In 2002, she was elected chair of the Illinois Republican Party, holding that office until 2005.

She declined to run for re-election as treasurer in 2006, instead running for Governor of Illinois. In March 2006, she was nominated as the Republican candidate. She was the second woman (after 1994 Democratic nominee Dawn Clark Netsch) and first Republican woman to be nominated for governor of Illinois. She lost the election to Democratic incumbent Rod Blagojevich.

In 2010, she successfully ran for the office of Illinois Comptroller. She was re-elected to a second four-year term in November 2014, but died of a stroke only a month later.

== Early years ==
Topinka was born in the Chicago, Illinois, suburb of Riverside to Lillian Mary (Shuss) and William D. Baar, the children of Czech and Slovak immigrants. After graduating from Ferry Hall School in Lake Forest in 1962, she attended Northwestern University in nearby Evanston. Topinka received a Bachelor of Science degree in journalism from the university's Medill School of Journalism. She was a member of the Alpha Gamma Delta sorority.

== Journalism and public relations careers ==
After graduating from Northwestern, Topinka became a reporter for several suburban Chicago newspapers, eventually becoming an editor. On the side, Topinka established her own public relations business, through which she began a career in consulting for various political candidates.

== Political career ==
=== Legislative career ===
In 1980, Topinka first pursued her own career in politics by running for the Illinois General Assembly. She won a seat in the Illinois House of Representatives and served two two-year terms, respectively for the 7th and 43rd districts. In 1984, she set her sights on the upper house of the Illinois General Assembly and won a seat in the Illinois Senate where she represented the 22nd district for ten years.

=== Illinois State Treasurer ===
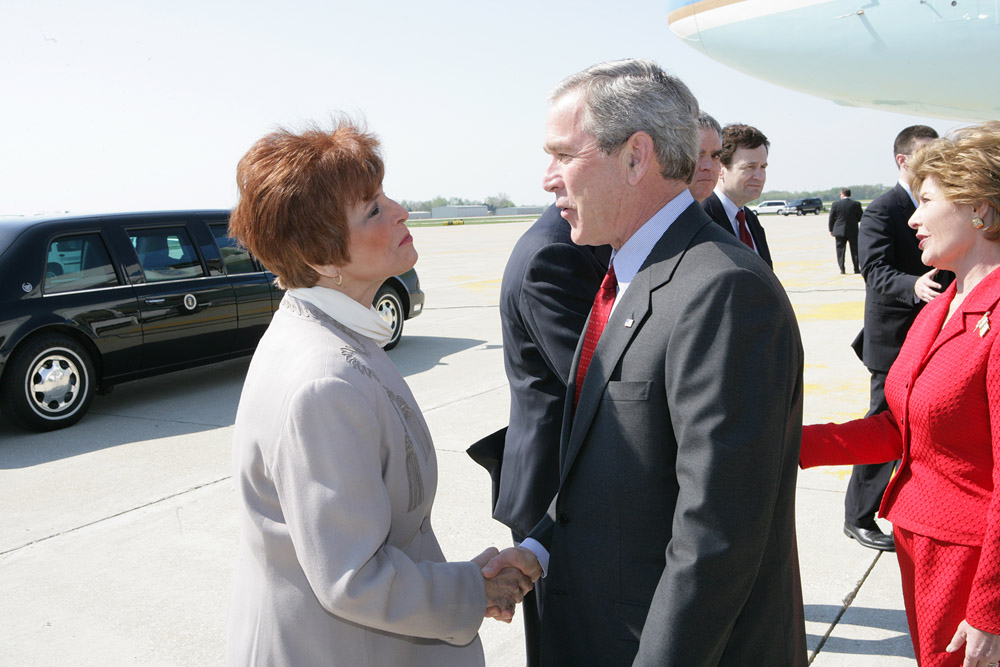
Topinka greets President George W. Bush in April 2005

In the middle of a term as state senator, Topinka joined the Illinois State Treasurer race in 1994 and won the election. She was reelected in 1998 and 2002.

As state treasurer, Topinka cut a deal to allow hotels that were owned by indicted Springfield power-broker Bill Cellini to pay $10 million to settle their debts which totaled $40.3 million. This deal was quashed by Attorney General Jim Ryan who stated that the hotels were worth more than the $10 million for which Topinka had attempted to settle the debt.

=== Illinois gubernatorial campaign ===
On November 7, 2005, Topinka announced that she would not seek re-election as state treasurer—instead, she entered the gubernatorial primary, hoping to challenge Democratic Governor Rod Blagojevich. The Republican primary was deeply divisive; her tenure as Party chairman destroyed her support from the conservative wing of her party, and it was feared that her pro-choice and positive gay rights positions would be detrimental to her standing with the same conservatives. In December she announced that she would join forces with DuPage County State's Attorney Joe Birkett as a candidate for Lieutenant Governor of Illinois.

In February 2006, the candidates for the Republican nomination for Illinois Governor began running their first TV ads for the March statewide primary election. Rival candidate Ron Gidwitz's advertisements, attacking Topinka, were rebuked in the same week by the Illinois Republican Party: "In an unprecedented action, the Illinois Republican Party has officially rebuked the Gidwitz campaign for this ad because the Party found that the ad violates the Party's "Code of Conduct," which was enacted to police proper conduct among Republican candidates."

Later in February, candidate Jim Oberweis, another rival for the Republican gubernatorial nomination, started a series of attack ads against Topinka for television markets that were even more widely criticized, mostly for using "fake" headlines on the images of actual Illinois newspapers. (Note: Article originally published in the Chicago Tribune about Oberweis's "faked" newspaper headline campaign ads.) (Note: FactCheck.org article about the same ads. Archived July 20, 2011, at the Wayback Machine) These ads, like Gidwitz's ads, also came under review by the Illinois Republican Party. (Note: Article originally published in the St. Louis Post-Dispatch about Oberweis's ads coming under review by the Illinois Republican Party.) Because of the controversy generated, several television stations withdrew Oberweis's ads. (Note: Article originally published in the Daily Herald about the withdrawal of Oberweis's ads from some Illinois television markets.)

On March 21, 2006, Topinka won the Republican nomination with 37 percent of the vote.

On November 7, 2006, she lost the race to Blagojevich.

=== Illinois Comptroller ===
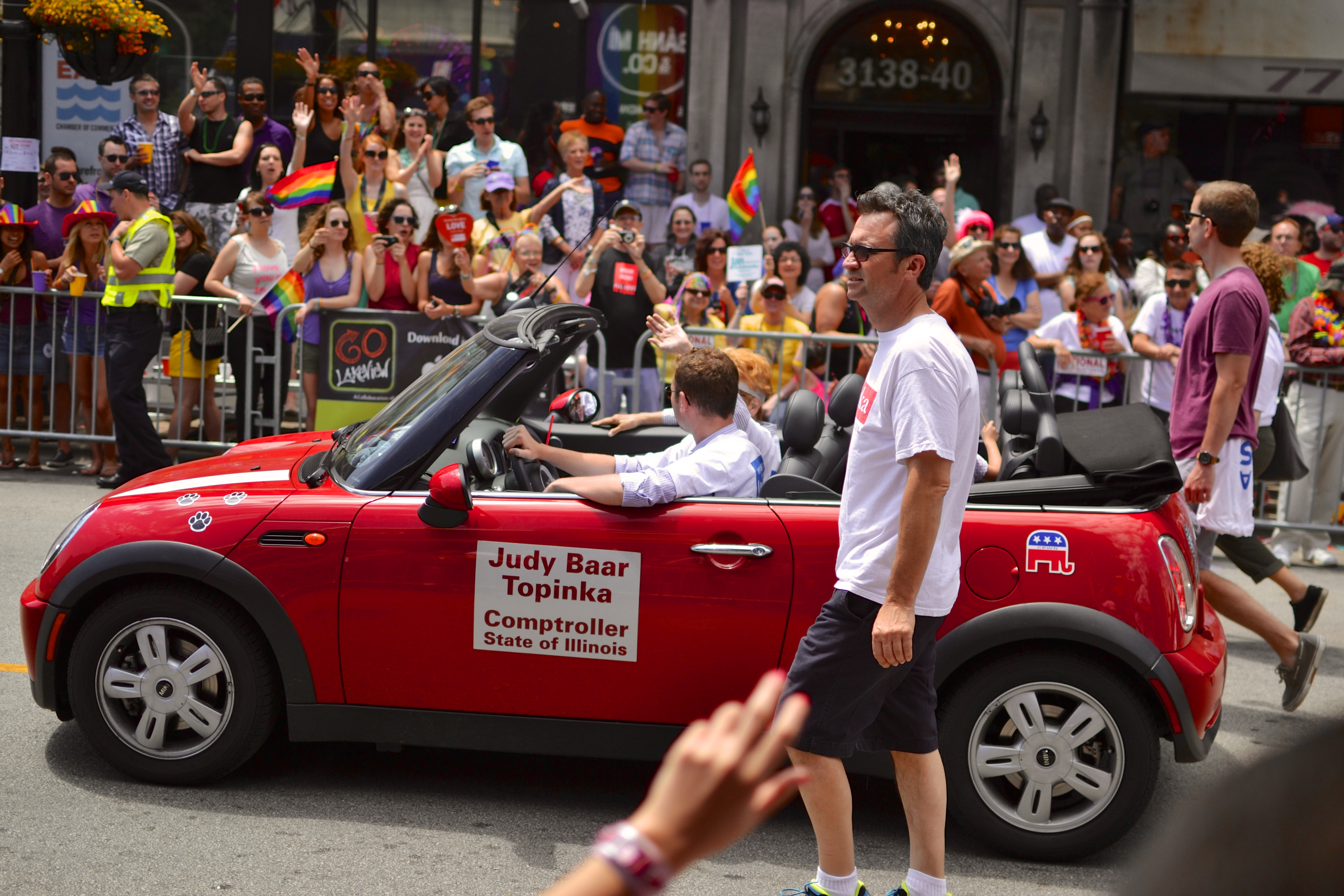
Topinka at a gay pride parade

Topinka was a candidate for the office of Illinois State Comptroller in the 2010 election, facing conservative radio host William J. Kelly and Orland Park Village Trustee Jim Dodge in the Republican primary. She won the nomination with 59% of the vote. She went on to win the general election against Illinois state representative David E. Miller (D), Julie Fox (L) and E. Erika Schafer (G). She won re-election in November 2014.

=== Electoral history ===
- 2014 election for Illinois State Comptroller
  - Judy Baar Topinka (R) (inc.), 50%
  - Sheila Simon (D), 46%
  - Julie Fox (L), 5%
- 2010 election for Illinois State Comptroller
  - Judy Baar Topinka (R), 53%
  - David Miller (D), 41%
  - Julie Fox (L), 3%
  - R. Erika Schafer (G), 3%
- 2006 election for Governor of Illinois
  - Rod Blagojevich (D) (inc.), 50%
  - Judy Baar Topinka (R), 39%
  - Rich Whitney (Green), 10%
- 2002 election for Illinois State Treasurer
  - Judy Baar Topinka (Republican) (inc.), 55%
  - Tom Dart (Democrat), 43%
- 1998 election for Illinois State Treasurer
  - Judy Baar Topinka (Republican) (inc.), 50%
  - Dan McLaughlin (Democrat), 48%
- 1994 election for Illinois State Treasurer
  - Judy Baar Topinka (Republican), 51%
  - Nancy Shaheen (Democrat), 49%

== Personal life and death ==
In 1965, she married Joe Topinka. They had a son, Joseph, before divorcing in 1981.

Topinka was a member of the Illinois St. Andrew Society and attended multiple events for it throughout the year. She could play four instruments and could fluently speak four languages, English, Czech, Spanish and Polish.

On December 9, 2014, Topinka was admitted to MacNeal Hospital in Berwyn, a western suburb of Chicago, after reporting discomfort. After undergoing tests, she appeared to be doing well. However, overnight she suddenly lost consciousness and was pronounced dead from a stroke at shortly after 2 a.m. on December 10. President Barack Obama referred to Topinka as "an institution in Illinois politics", citing her service in a statement from the White House. Illinois Governor Pat Quinn said it was a "sad day in the state of Illinois", calling her "a trailblazer in every sense of the word". Topinka was succeeded by Jerry Stermer as comptroller.

== See also ==
- Political party strength in Illinois

== Notes ==
Illinois House of Representatives
Preceded by Henry Klosak; Paul J. Matula	Member of the Illinois House of Representatives from the 7th district 1981–1983; Served alongside: John S. Kociolko, Robert Pechous	Succeeded by John Cullerton
Preceded by George Ryan; Ray A. Christensen; Edward McBroom	Member of the Illinois House of Representatives from the 43rd district 1983–1985	Succeeded by Jack L. Kubik
Illinois Senate
Preceded by Leonard F. Becker	Member of the Illinois Senate from the 22nd district 1985–1995	Succeeded by Thomas J. Walsh
Political offices
Preceded by Pat Quinn	Treasurer of Illinois; 1995–2007	Succeeded by Alexi Giannoulias
Preceded by Daniel Hynes	Comptroller of Illinois; 2011–2014	Succeeded by Jerry Stermer
Party political offices
Preceded by Greg Baise	Republican nominee for Illinois Treasurer; 1994, 1998, 2002	Succeeded by Christine Radogno
Preceded by Gary MacDougal	Chair of the Illinois Republican Party; 2002–2005	Succeeded by Andrew McKenna
Preceded by Jim Ryan	Republican nominee for Governor of Illinois; 2006	Succeeded by Bill Brady
Preceded by Carole Pankau	Republican nominee for Illinois Comptroller; 2010, 2014	Succeeded by Leslie Munger
