= 2010 Illinois elections =

- November 2, 2010
- Turnout: 50.53%

Elections were held in Illinois on Tuesday, November 2, 2010. Primary elections were held on February 2, 2010.

== Election information ==
2010 was a midterm election year in the United States.

=== Turnout ===
==== Primary election ====
For the primary election, turnout was 23.14%, with 1,758,489 votes cast.

Turnout by county

County	Registration	Votes cast	Turnout
Adams	45,182	7,655	16.94%
Alexander	7,942	1,727	21.75%
Bond	11,734	1,786	15.22%
Boone	33,048	6,596	19.96%
Brown	3,852	832	21.6%
Bureau	23,216	4,034	17.38%
Calhoun	3,766	1,901	50.48%
Carroll	12,139	2,814	23.18%
Cass	9,553	3,584	37.52%
Champaign	117,991	22,466	19.04%
Christian	22,459	7,068	31.47%
Clark	12,821	2,279	17.78%
Clay	9,798	1,942	19.82%
Clinton	25,528	3,422	13.4%
Coles	30,412	8,957	29.45%
Cook (Note: For more on Cook County primary turnout, see 2010 Cook County, Illinois elections#Voter turnout)	2,883,692	761,626	26.41%
Crawford	14,324	2,286	15.96%
Cumberland	9,048	2,272	25.11%
DeKalb	56,012	14,024	25.04%
DeWitt	11,689	3,856	32.99%
Douglas	11,722	4,184	35.69%
DuPage	548,771	136,750	24.92%
Edgar	13,170	3,004	22.81%
Edwards	4,689	943	20.11%
Effingham	22,187	5,666	25.54%
Fayette	15,289	2,891	18.91%
Ford	8,710	2,834	32.54%
Franklin	31,891	8,752	27.44%
Fulton	24,642	5,772	23.42%
Gallatin	4,237	1,991	46.99%
Greene	8,615	2,223	25.8%
Grundy	30,933	6,952	22.47%
Hamilton	5,781	1,849	31.98%
Hancock	13,496	2,610	19.34%
Hardin	3,709	1,437	38.74%
Henderson	5,179	1,447	27.94%
Henry	37,309	8,438	22.62%
Iroquois	19,277	7,674	39.81%
Jackson	36,567	6,873	18.8%
Jasper	7,505	2,350	31.31%
Jefferson	24,172	4,624	19.13%
Jersey	17,041	2,625	15.4%
Jo Daviess	16,321	4,044	24.78%
Johnson	7,876	3,029	38.46%
Kane	264,600	52,530	19.85%
Kankakee	67,614	11,056	16.35%
Kendall	60,295	13,459	22.32%
Knox	33,720	6,226	18.46%
Lake	401,680	83,908	20.89%
LaSalle	71,815	15,314	21.32%
Lawrence	10,640	3,134	29.45%
Lee	25,107	4,543	18.09%
Livingston	21,477	7,776	36.21%
Logan	19,999	5,417	27.09%
Macon	71,226	13,303	18.68%
Macoupin	34,040	8,107	23.82%
Madison	173,397	27,383	15.79%
Marion	27,689	6,744	24.36%
Marshall	8,510	1,922	22.59%
Mason	10,502	2,015	19.19%
Massac	12,104	2,303	19.03%
McDonough	16,762	4,206	25.09%
McHenry	200,688	36,078	17.98%
McLean	95,280	21,257	22.31%
Menard	9,701	2,083	21.47%
Mercer	14,288	2,348	16.43%
Monroe	22,962	4,276	18.62%
Montgomery	17,667	5,223	29.56%
Morgan	23,096	4,620	20%
Moultrie	8,967	2,239	24.97%
Ogle	40,360	8,881	22%
Peoria	110,919	22,637	20.41%
Perry	14,928	3,710	24.85%
Piatt	12,079	4,024	33.31%
Pike	10,723	2,232	20.82%
Pope	3,376	1,388	41.11%
Pulaski	7,157	1,470	20.54%
Putnam	4,228	1,530	36.19%
Randolph	20,725	4,543	21.92%
Richland	13,644	2,264	16.59%
Rock Island	124,361	18,224	14.65%
Saline	16,366	3,591	21.94%
Sangamon	133,469	25,838	19.36%
Schuyler	5,522	1,271	23.02%
Scott	3,942	836	21.21%
Shelby	15,465	3,639	23.53%
Stark	4,747	1,369	28.84%
St. Clair	186,372	32,986	17.7%
Stephenson	34,480	6,303	18.28%
Tazewell	87,517	18,751	21.43%
Union	15,280	4,086	26.74%
Vermilion	47,735	8,598	18.01%
Wabash	9,515	1,351	14.2%
Warren	11,261	2,598	23.07%
Washington	9,720	3,399	34.97%
Wayne	12,490	5,201	41.64%
White	11,515	1,790	15.54%
Whiteside	39,407	5,635	14.3%
Will	360,651	79,000	21.9%
Williamson	41,960	10,324	24.6%
Winnebago	178,992	27,115	15.15%
Woodford	24,935	6,346	25.45%
Total	7,600,962	1,758,489	23.14%

==== General election ====
For the general election, turnout was 50.53%, with 3,792,770 votes cast.

Turnout by county

County	Registration	Votes cast	Turnout
Adams	44,891	24,125	53.74%
Alexander	7,806	2,910	37.28%
Bond	11,886	5,618	47.27%
Boone	33,464	15,111	45.16%
Brown	3,489	2,227	63.83%
Bureau	23,782	12,969	54.53%
Calhoun	3,817	2,418	63.35%
Carroll	11,895	5,242	44.07%
Cass	9,830	3,964	40.33%
Champaign	122,441	54,818	44.77%
Christian	22,692	12,780	56.32%
Clark	12,914	6,236	48.29%
Clay	9,850	4,992	50.68%
Clinton	32,161	13,205	41.06%
Coles	31,489	15,087	47.91%
Cook (Note: For more on Cook County general election turnout, see 2010 Cook County, Illinois elections#Voter turnout)	2,704,993	1,424,959	52.68%
Crawford	14,133	7,020	49.67%
Cumberland	7,708	4,393	56.99%
DeKalb	57,102	29,197	51.13%
DeWitt	11,733	5,815	49.56%
Douglas	11,980	6,545	54.63%
DuPage	558,929	288,680	51.65%
Edgar	13,238	7,143	53.96%
Edwards	4,622	2,296	49.68%
Effingham	22,838	13,202	57.81%
Fayette	15,406	6,891	44.73%
Ford	8,908	4,699	52.75%
Franklin	29,513	13,334	45.18%
Fulton	24,904	11,833	47.51%
Gallatin	4,234	2,299	54.3%
Greene	8,753	4,540	51.87%
Grundy	29,708	16,973	57.13%
Hamilton	5,853	3,644	62.26%
Hancock	13,461	6,943	51.58%
Hardin	3,833	2,194	57.24%
Henderson	5,231	3,574	68.32%
Henry	35,322	18,444	52.22%
Iroquois	19,847	10,703	53.93%
Jackson	42,164	16,696	39.6%
Jasper	7,586	4,126	54.39%
Jefferson	24,750	12,663	51.16%
Jersey	17,250	7,825	45.36%
Jo Daviess	16,347	8,279	50.65%
Johnson	8,083	4,777	59.1%
Kane	260,429	129,050	49.55%
Kankakee	64,306	32,999	51.32%
Kendall	65,153	31,538	48.41%
Knox	34,258	16,943	49.46%
Lake	404,637	207,499	51.28%
LaSalle	73,051	34,423	47.12%
Lawrence	10,770	5,314	49.34%
Lee	25,723	11,075	43.05%
Livingston	21,968	12,844	58.47%
Logan	20,088	9,008	44.84%
Macon	72,975	37,186	50.96%
Macoupin	34,443	16,809	48.8%
Madison	177,371	83,208	46.91%
Marion	28,274	12,227	43.24%
Marshall	8,613	4,379	50.84%
Mason	10,510	4,995	47.53%
Massac	12,350	5,047	40.87%
McDonough	17,909	9,433	52.67%
McHenry	202,033	95,339	47.19%
McLean	97,274	52,944	54.43%
Menard	9,744	4,951	50.81%
Mercer	14,295	6,892	48.21%
Monroe	23,792	12,037	50.59%
Montgomery	18,162	9,911	54.57%
Morgan	22,816	10,978	48.12%
Moultrie	8,904	4,964	55.75%
Ogle	40,973	17,461	42.62%
Peoria	121,725	53,848	44.24%
Perry	14,989	7,663	51.12%
Piatt	11,990	6,895	57.51%
Pike	11,418	6,525	57.15%
Pope	3,397	2,089	61.5%
Pulaski	5,961	2,972	49.86%
Putnam	4,296	2,371	55.19%
Randolph	21,130	11,902	56.33%
Richland	13,826	5,217	37.73%
Rock Island	125,875	47,053	37.38%
Saline	16,780	8,292	49.42%
Sangamon	136,649	74,124	54.24%
Schuyler	5,618	3,035	54.02%
Scott	3,996	1,828	45.75%
Shelby	15,610	8,309	53.23%
Stark	4,752	1,969	41.44%
St. Clair	194,486	82,250	42.29%
Stephenson	34,930	15,008	42.97%
Tazewell	89,514	46,268	51.69%
Union	15,156	6,745	44.5%
Vermilion	48,711	22,833	46.87%
Wabash	9,242	4,057	43.9%
Warren	11,953	6,134	51.32%
Washington	10,662	5,979	56.08%
Wayne	12,689	6,983	55.03%
White	11,598	5,361	46.22%
Whiteside	38,300	19,240	50.23%
Will	371,079	196,857	53.05%
Williamson	43,569	22,735	52.18%
Winnebago	179,182	83,229	46.45%
Woodford	25,333	14,156	55.88%
Total	7,506,073	3,792,770	50.53%

== Federal elections ==
=== United States Senate ===
Incumbent Democrat Roland Burris, appointed in 2009 by then-Governor Rod Blagojevich to fill the U.S. Senate seat that Barack Obama had vacated after being elected President of the United States, did not seek reelection.

U.S. Congressman Mark Kirk (Republican Party) won against State Treasurer Alexi Giannoulias (Democratic Party), Mike Labno (Libertarian Party), and football coach LeAlan Jones (Green Party) in both a regular election for the Senate seat and a coinciding special election to fill the remainder of Barack Obama's unexpired term.

=== United States House ===
All Illinois seats in the United States House of Representatives were up for election in 2010.

The Republican Party flipped four Democratic-held seats, making the composition of Illinois' House delegation 11 Republicans and 8 Democrats.

== State elections ==
=== Governor and lieutenant governor ===
Incumbent Governor Pat Quinn, who became governor after Rod Blagojevich was removed from office, was elected outright to his first full term.

Governor/Lieutenant Governor election
Party	Candidate	Votes	%
Democratic	Pat Quinn (incumbent) / Sheila Simon	1,745,219	46.79
Republican	Bill Brady / Jason Plummer	1,713,385	45.94
Independent	Scott Lee Cohen / Baxter B. Swilley	135,705	3.64
Green	Rich Whitney / Don W. Crawford	100,756	2.70
Libertarian	Lex Green / Ed Rutledge	34,681	0.93
Write-in		243	0.01
Total votes		3,729,989	100

=== Attorney general ===
2010 Illinois Attorney General election
- November 2, 2010
- Turnout: 49.36%
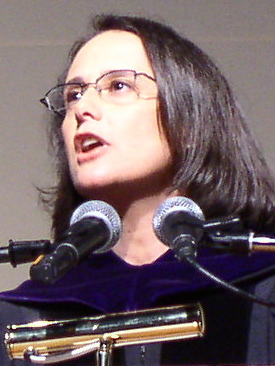

Nominee	Lisa Madigan	Steve Kim
Party	Democratic	Republican
Popular vote	2,397,723	1,172,427
Percentage	64.72%	31.65%
- County results Madigan: 40–50% 50–60% 60–70% 70–80% Kim: 40–50% 50–60% 60–70%
Attorney General before election
Lisa Madigan
Democratic
Elected Attorney General
Lisa Madigan
Democratic

Incumbent Democratic attorney general Lisa Madigan won reelection to a third term in office

==== Democratic primary ====
Attorney General Democratic primary
Party	Candidate	Votes	%
Democratic	Lisa Madigan (incumbent)	838,605	100
Total votes		838,605	100

==== Republican primary ====
Attorney General Republican primary
Party	Candidate	Votes	%
Republican	Steve Kim	641,689	100
Total votes		641,689	100

==== Green primary ====
Attorney General Green primary
Party	Candidate	Votes	%
Green	David F. Black	4,917	100
Total votes		4,917	100

==== General election ====
Attorney General election
Party	Candidate	Votes	%
Democratic	Lisa Madigan (incumbent)	2,397,723	64.72
Republican	Steve Kim	1,172,427	31.65
Green	David F. Black	80,004	2.16
Libertarian	Bill Malan	54,532	1.47
Total votes		3,704,686	100

=== Secretary of state ===
2010 Illinois Secretary of State election
- November 2, 2010
- Turnout: 49.39%
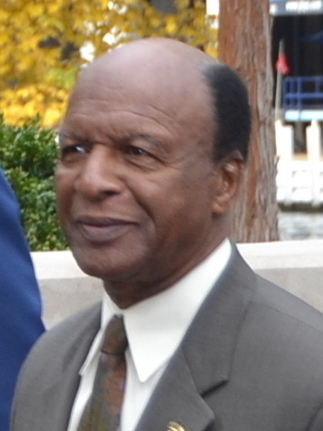

Nominee	Jesse White	Robert Enriquez
Party	Democratic	Republican
Popular vote	2,590,222	1,001,544
Percentage	69.87%	27.02%
- County results White: 40–50% 50–60% 60–70% 70–80% 80–90% Enriquez: 40–50% 50–60%
Secretary of State before election
Jesse White
Democratic
Elected Secretary of State
Jesse White
Democratic

Incumbent Democratic Secretary of State Jesse White won reelection to a fourth term in office.

==== Democratic primary ====
Secretary of State Democratic primary
Party	Candidate	Votes	%
Democratic	Jesse White (incumbent)	854,408	100
Total votes		854,408	100

==== Republican primary ====
Secretary of State Republican primary
Party	Candidate	Votes	%
Republican	Robert Enriquez	627,224	100
Total votes		627,224	100

==== Green primary ====
Secretary of State Green primary
Party	Candidate	Votes	%
Green	Adrian Frost	4,931	100
Total votes		4,931	100

==== General election ====
Green Party nominee Adrian Frost withdrew before the election.

Secretary of State election
Party	Candidate	Votes	%
Democratic	Jesse White (incumbent)	2,590,222	69.87
Republican	Robert Enriquez	1,001,544	27.02
Libertarian	Josh Hanson	115,458	3.11
Total votes		3,707,224	100

=== Comptroller ===
2010 Illinois State Comptroller election
- November 2, 2010
- Turnout: 48.79%
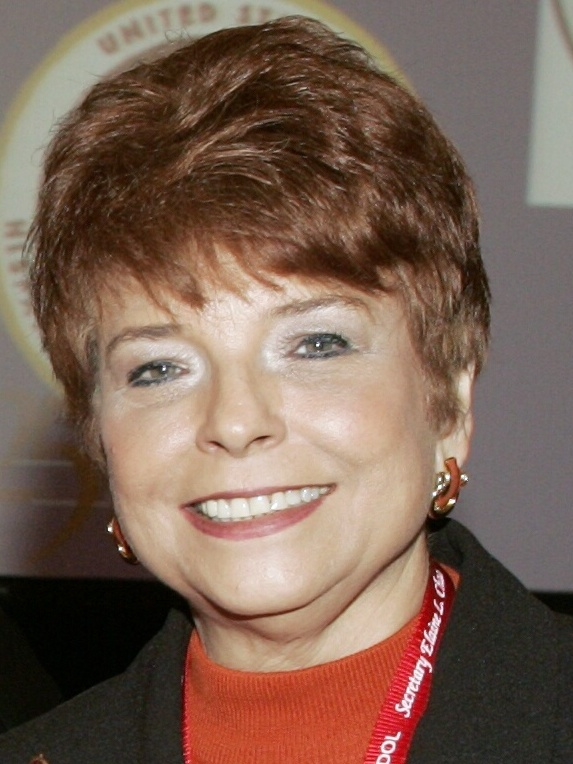

Nominee	Judy Baar Topinka	David E. Miller
Party	Republican	Democratic
Popular vote	1,927,139	1,497,263
Percentage	52.62%	40.88%
- County results Topinka: 40–50% 50–60% 60–70% 70–80% Miller: 40–50% 50–60%
State Comptroller before election
Daniel Hynes
Democratic
Elected State Comptroller
Judy Baar Topinka
Republican

Incumbent Comptroller Daniel Hynes, a Democrat, did not seek a fourth term. Republican Judy Baar Topinka was elected to succeed him.

==== Democratic primary ====
Comptroller Democratic primary
Party	Candidate	Votes	%
Democratic	David E. Miller	393,405	46.71
Democratic	S. Raja Krishnamoorthi	384,796	45.68
Democratic	Clinton A. "Clint" Krislov	64,086	7.61
Total votes		842,287	100

==== Republican primary ====
Comptroller Republican primary
Party	Candidate	Votes	%
Republican	Judy Baar Topinka	430,996	59.19
Republican	William J. Kelly	157,774	21.67
Republican	Jim Dodge	139,336	19.14
Total votes		728,106	100

==== Green primary ====
Comptroller Green primary
Party	Candidate	Votes	%
Green	R. Erika Schafer	4,908	100
Total votes		4,908	100

==== General election ====
Comptroller election
Party	Candidate	Votes	%
Republican	Judy Baar Topinka	1,927,139	52.62
Democratic	David E. Miller	1,497,263	40.88
Libertarian	Julie Fox	121,068	3.31
Green	R. Erika Schafer	116,712	3.19
Total votes		3,662,182	100

=== Treasurer ===
2010 Illinois State Treasurer election
- November 2, 2010
- Turnout: 48.58%
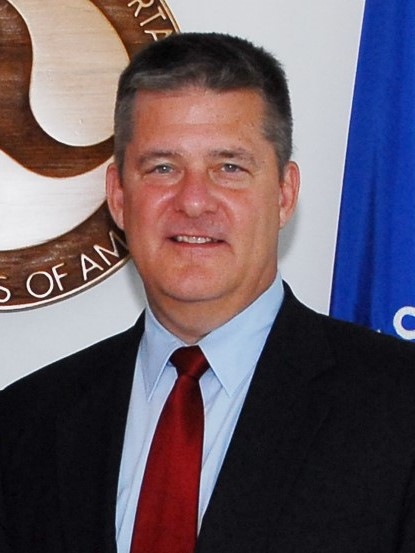

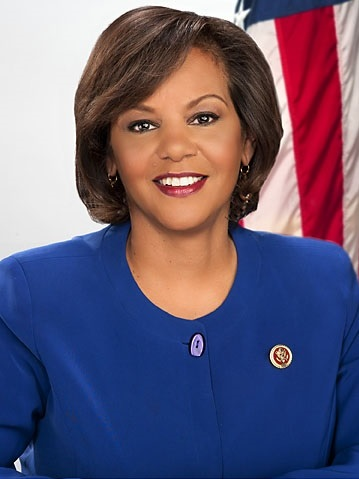
Nominee	Dan Rutherford	Robin Kelly
Party	Republican	Democratic
Popular vote	1,811,293	1,650,244
Percentage	49.68%	45.26%
- County results Rutherford: 40–50% 50–60% 60–70% 70–80% 80–90% Kelly: 40–50% 50–60% 60–70%
Treasurer before election
Alexi Giannoulias
Democratic
Elected Treasurer
Dan Rutherford
Republican

Incumbent Treasurer Alexi Giannoulias, a Democrat, did not seek reelection to a second term, instead opting to run for United States Senate. Republican Dan Rutherford was elected to succeed him. As of 2022, this is the last time a Republican was elected Illinois state treasurer.

==== Democratic primary ====
Treasurer Democratic primary
Party	Candidate	Votes	%
Democratic	Robin Kelly	472,494	57.92
Democratic	Justin P. Oberman	343,307	42.08
Total votes		815,801	100

==== Republican primary ====
Treasurer Republican primary
Party	Candidate	Votes	%
Republican	Dan Rutherford	654,517	100
Total votes		654,517	100

==== Green primary ====
Treasurer Green primary
Party	Candidate	Votes	%
Green	Scott K. Summers	4,918	100
Total votes		4,918	100

==== General election ====
Treasurer election
Party	Candidate	Votes	%
Republican	Dan Rutherford	1,811,293	49.68
Democratic	Robin Kelly	1,650,244	45.26
Green	Scott K. Summers	115,772	3.18
Libertarian	James Pauly	68,803	1.89
Total votes		3,646,112	100

=== State senate ===
One-third of the seats of the Illinois Senate were up for election in 2010.

- Illinois State Senate elections, 2010 at Ballotpedia

=== State House of Representatives ===
All of the seats in the Illinois House of Representatives were up for election in 2010.

- Illinois House of Representatives elections, 2010 at Ballotpedia

=== Judicial elections ===
Multiple judicial positions were up for election in 2010.

- VoteForJudges.org

=== Ballot measure ===
One measure, the Governor recall amendment, was certified for the 2010 statewide election.

- Illinois 2010 ballot measures at Ballotpedia

==== Illinois Governor Recall Amendment ====
Voters approved the Illinois Governor Recall Amendment, allowing voters to hold recall elections of Illinois Governors. In order to be approved, the measure required either 60% support among those specifically voting on the amendment or 50% support among all ballots cast in the elections. The 60% support threshold was exceeded.

Illinois Governor Recall Amendment
Option	Votes	% of votes on measure	% of all ballots cast
For	1,639,158	65.90	43.36
Against	846,966	34.10	22.40
Total votes	2,486,124	100	65.76
Voter turnout	33.12%		

== Local elections ==
Local elections were held. These included county elections, such as the Cook County elections.
