= 2016 Illinois elections =

- November 8, 2016
- Turnout: 70.56%

The Illinois general election was held on November 8, 2016.

Primaries were held March 15.

In addition to federal races for president, Senate, and House, all 118 seats of the Illinois House of Representatives and 40 seats (out of 59) of the Illinois Senate were up for election, a special election was held for Illinois Comptroller, judicial elections were held, and a statewide ballot measure was voted upon.

== Election information ==
=== Turnout ===
==== Primary election ====
For the primary election, turnout was 46.56%, with 3,569,960 votes cast. Over 520,000 of votes cast were done so as early votes.

Turnout by county

County	Registration	Votes cast	Turnout
Adams	45,246	17,946	39.66%
Alexander	5,825	2,021	34.7%
Bond	12,365	4,479	36.22%
Boone	31,979	14,691	45.94%
Brown	3,388	1,357	40.05%
Bureau	23,881	9,107	38.13%
Calhoun	3,511	1,810	51.55%
Carroll	11,499	4,980	43.31%
Cass	7,721	2,724	35.28%
Champaign	119,454	59,003	49.39%
Christian	22,335	8,533	38.2%
Clark	11,699	4,954	42.35%
Clay	9,221	3,588	38.91%
Clinton	24,952	8,072	32.35%
Coles	28,751	12,890	44.83%
Cook (Note: For more on Cook County primary turnout, see 2016 Cook County, Illinois elections#Voter turnout)	2,958,173	1,512,348	51.12%
Crawford	12,558	4,875	38.82%
Cumberland	7,753	3,756	48.45%
DeKalb	57,530	26,517	46.09%
DeWitt	12,109	5,205	42.98%
Douglas	11,390	5,344	46.92%
DuPage	572,109	289,589	50.62%
Edgar	12,710	4,728	37.2%
Edwards	4,256	2,326	54.65%
Effingham	22,691	10,166	44.8%
Fayette	12,821	5,363	41.83%
Ford	8,499	4,198	49.39%
Franklin	27,115	11,660	43%
Fulton	25,434	9,445	37.14%
Gallatin	3,776	2,393	63.37%
Greene	8,523	3,394	39.82%
Grundy	30,702	13,115	42.72%
Hamilton	5,731	2,821	49.22%
Hancock	12,096	4,773	39.46%
Hardin	2,851	1,395	48.93%
Henderson	4,931	1,890	38.33%
Henry	35,371	13,142	37.15%
Iroquois	17,844	8,210	46.01%
Jackson	39,167	13,587	34.69%
Jasper	6,746	3,082	45.69%
Jefferson	23,169	11,047	47.68%
Jersey	15,547	6,078	39.09%
Jo Daviess	15,622	6,963	44.57%
Johnson	8,390	4,091	48.76%
Kane	279,908	114,192	40.8%
Kankakee	63,673	25,982	40.81%
Kendall	69,158	31,079	44.94%
Knox	32,987	13,345	40.46%
Lake	413,663	182,851	44.2%
LaSalle	67,991	27,728	40.78%
Lawrence	9,139	3,631	39.73%
Lee	22,425	9,742	43.44%
Livingston	21,790	11,100	50.94%
Logan	18,892	7,949	42.08%
Macon	74,240	27,774	37.41%
Macoupin	31,424	14,730	46.88%
Madison	170,325	72,740	42.71%
Marion	25,772	9,710	37.68%
Marshall	8,459	4,399	52%
Mason	9,848	3,617	36.73%
Massac	11,580	4,139	35.74%
McDonough	17,113	6,973	40.75%
McHenry	205,178	88,950	43.35%
McLean	105,634	52,686	49.88%
Menard	8,975	3,746	41.74%
Mercer	11,721	4,583	39.1%
Monroe	23,911	11,259	47.09%
Montgomery	17,529	8,486	48.41%
Morgan	22,504	8,763	38.94%
Moultrie	8,362	3,834	45.85%
Ogle	31,570	15,757	49.91%
Peoria	109,327	48,014	43.92%
Perry	14,369	5,120	35.63%
Piatt	11,567	6,780	58.62%
Pike	11,649	4,401	37.78%
Pope	2,939	1,336	45.46%
Pulaski	4,353	1,642	37.72%
Putnam	4,254	1,929	45.35%
Randolph	21,036	7,329	34.84%
Richland	11,151	4,118	36.93%
Rock Island	96,885	34,567	35.68%
Saline	15,823	6,891	43.55%
Sangamon	128,576	55,764	43.37%
Schuyler	5,440	2,270	41.73%
Scott	3,721	1,488	39.99%
Shelby	14,751	6,753	45.78%
Stark	4,089	1,597	39.06%
St. Clair	179,296	70,138	39.12%
Stephenson	33,736	12,854	38.1%
Tazewell	88,509	40,896	46.21%
Union	12,422	5,360	43.15%
Vermilion	45,413	17,506	38.55%
Wabash	8,462	3,078	36.37%
Warren	11,053	4,585	41.48%
Washington	9,620	4,354	45.26%
Wayne	11,986	5,613	46.83%
White	10,379	4,015	38.68%
Whiteside	36,702	13,056	35.57%
Will	402,557	177,799	44.17%
Williamson	44,300	18,560	41.9%
Winnebago	165,291	71,089	43.01%
Woodford	25,895	13,657	52.74%
Total	7,666,763	3,569,960	46.56%

==== General election ====
For the general election, turnout was 70.56%, with 5,666,118 votes cast.

Turnout by county

County	Registration	Votes cast	Turnout%
Adams	47,072	32,563	69.18%
Alexander	5,867	2,880	49.09%
Bond	12,550	7,644	60.91%
Boone	32,972	23,199	70.36%
Brown	3,769	2,413	64.02%
Bureau	24,087	16,771	69.63%
Calhoun	3,554	2,622	73.78%
Carroll	11,008	7,566	68.73%
Cass	7,895	5,187	65.7%
Champaign	134,352	92,842	69.1%
Christian	22,732	15,713	69.12%
Clark	12,020	8,003	66.58%
Clay	9,642	6,421	66.59%
Clinton	25,414	17,599	69.25%
Coles	30,778	22,138	71.93%
Cook (Note: For more on Cook County general election turnout, see 2016 Cook County, Illinois elections#Voter turnout)	3,082,719	2,205,504	71.54%
Crawford	12,983	8,824	67.97%
Cumberland	7,930	5,630	71%
DeKalb	62,119	43,978	70.8%
DeWitt	12,374	7,628	61.65%
Douglas	12,041	8,285	68.81%
DuPage	614,752	435,143	70.78%
Edgar	13,273	8,008	60.33%
Edwards	4,311	3,395	78.75%
Effingham	23,755	17,788	74.88%
Fayette	13,336	9,727	72.94%
Ford	9,586	6,480	67.6%
Franklin	27,697	18,943	68.39%
Fulton	25,869	15,938	61.61%
Gallatin	3,838	2,760	71.91%
Greene	8,652	5,652	65.33%
Grundy	32,626	23,474	71.95%
Hamilton	5,779	4,252	73.58%
Hancock	12,370	9,223	74.56%
Hardin	2,937	2,202	74.97%
Henderson	4,865	3,594	73.87%
Henry	36,454	24,986	68.54%
Iroquois	18,345	13,270	72.34%
Jackson	41,829	24,870	59.46%
Jasper	6,912	5,231	75.68%
Jefferson	24,171	17,192	71.13%
Jersey	16,115	11,114	68.97%
Jo Daviess	16,207	11,496	70.93%
Johnson	8,539	6,166	72.21%
Kane	300,293	204,393	68.06%
Kankakee	64,829	47,785	73.71%
Kendall	75,755	54,495	71.94%
Knox	34,031	22,838	67.11%
Lake	430,436	306,829	71.28%
LaSalle	70,850	50,401	71.14%
Lawrence	9,375	6,164	65.75%
Lee	22,919	15,707	68.53%
Livingston	22,570	15,585	69.05%
Logan	19,235	12,564	65.32%
Macon	76,226	48,524	63.66%
Macoupin	31,700	22,681	71.55%
Madison	182,063	131,347	72.14%
Marion	24,915	17,281	69.36%
Marshall	8,266	6,081	73.57%
Mason	10,005	6,597	65.94%
Massac	11,801	6,773	57.39%
McDonough	18,782	13,318	70.91%
McHenry	218,178	145,254	66.58%
McLean	112,198	82,053	73.13%
Menard	9,232	6,589	71.37%
Mercer	12,081	8,625	71.39%
Monroe	24,890	19,517	78.41%
Montgomery	17,899	13,140	73.41%
Morgan	22,984	15,005	65.28%
Moultrie	8,642	6,358	73.57%
Ogle	33,627	24,460	72.74%
Peoria	118,746	81,462	68.6%
Perry	14,342	10,044	70.03%
Piatt	11,743	9,166	78.06%
Pike	11,909	7,607	63.88%
Pope	2,983	2,174	72.88%
Pulaski	4,398	2,775	63.1%
Putnam	4,260	3,183	74.72%
Randolph	21,376	14,445	67.58%
Richland	11,311	7,766	68.66%
Rock Island	100,163	64,672	64.57%
Saline	16,679	11,623	69.69%
Sangamon	136,312	99,757	73.18%
Schuyler	5,486	3,896	71.02%
Scott	3,790	2,640	69.66%
Shelby	15,175	11,158	73.53%
Stark	4,171	2,788	66.84%
St. Clair	184,932	122,936	66.48%
Stephenson	34,165	20,649	60.44%
Tazewell	90,769	65,511	72.17%
Union	12,685	8,742	68.92%
Vermilion	47,963	31,169	64.99%
Wabash	8,647	5,539	64.06%
Warren	11,373	7,916	69.6%
Washington	9,759	7,544	77.3%
Wayne	12,148	8,372	68.92%
White	10,690	7,392	69.15%
Whiteside	37,759	25,875	68.53%
Will	417,813	310,937	74.42%
Williamson	45,930	32,193	70.09%
Winnebago	175,630	121,296	69.06%
Woodford	26,862	20,213	75.25%
Total	8,029,847	5,666,118	70.56%

== Federal elections ==
=== United States President ===
United States presidential election in Illinois, 2016
Party	Candidate	Running mate	Votes	%	Electoral votes
Democratic	Hillary Clinton	Tim Kaine	3,090,729	55.8%	20
Republican	Donald Trump	Mike Pence	2,146,015	38.8%	0
Libertarian	Gary Johnson	William Weld	209,596	3.8%	0
Green	Jill Stein	Ajamu Baraka	76,802	1.4%	0
Total			5,374,280	100.0%	20

=== United States Senate ===
2016 United States Senate election in Illinois
Party	Candidate	Votes	%
Democratic	Tammy Duckworth	3,012,940	54.9%
Republican	Mark Kirk (incumbent)	2,184,692	39.8%
Libertarian	Kenton McMillen	175,988	3.2%
Green	Scott Summers	117,619	2.1%
Total votes		5,491,239	100.0%
Democratic gain from Republican			

=== United States House ===
All of Illinois' 18 seats in the United States House of Representatives were up for election in 2016.

The Democratic Party flipped one Republican-held seat, making the composition of Illinois' House delegation 11 Democrats and 7 Republicans.

== State elections ==
=== State House of Representatives ===
Democrats retained the majority in the State House of Representatives. However, they lost their veto-proof supermajority, as Republicans gained seats.

=== State Senate ===
Democrats retained the majority in the State Senate.

=== Judicial elections ===
Judicial elections were held. These consisted of both partisan and retention elections, including those for seven seats in the Illinois Appellate Court.

=== Ballot measure ===
Illinois voters voted a single ballot measure in 2016. In order to be approved, the measure required either 60% support among those specifically voting on the amendment or 50% support among all ballots cast in the elections.

==== Illinois Transportation Taxes and Fees Lockbox Amendment ====
Illinois voters approved the Illinois Transportation Taxes and Fees Lockbox Amendment, a legislatively referred constitutional amendment that prohibits lawmakers from using transportation funds for anything other than their stated purpose. In order to be approved, the measure required either 60% support among those specifically voting on the amendment or 50% support among all ballots cast in the elections.

Illinois Transportation Taxes and Fees Lockbox Amendment
Option	Votes	% of votes on measure	% of all ballots cast
For	3,796,654	78.94	67.47
Against	1,014,461	21.09	18.03
Total votes	4,811,115	100	85.50
Voter turnout	59.92%		

Amendment results by county Yes: 80–90%; 70–80%

== Local elections ==
Local elections were held. These included county elections, such as the Cook County elections.
