= Leslie Munger =

American politician

9th Comptroller of Illinois
- In office January 12, 2015 – December 5, 2016
- Governor: Bruce Rauner
- Preceded by: Jerry Stermer
- Succeeded by: Susana Mendoza

Personal details
- Born: September 5, 1956 (age 69) Joliet, Illinois, U.S.
- Party: Republican
- Education: University of Illinois, Urbana- Champaign (BS); Northwestern University (MBA)

Leslie Geissler Munger (born September 5, 1956) is an American politician and business executive who served as the Illinois Comptroller in 2015 and 2016. She was appointed by incoming Governor Bruce Rauner to fill the vacancy caused by the death of re-elected Comptroller Judy Baar Topinka.

== Career ==
Munger is a former corporate executive for Helene Curtis/Unilever. She oversaw the United States hair care business for Helene Curtis from 1984 to 2001 under former CEO Ron Gidwitz.

=== Political career ===
In 2014, Munger ran for the Illinois House of Representatives in the 59th District against incumbent Democrat Carol Sente but narrowly lost.

After the sudden death of Comptroller Judy Baar Topinka, then-Governor-elect Bruce Rauner appointed Munger as Comptroller. She was sworn in on January 12, 2015, the same date as Rauner and the other elected officials.

On November 8, 2016, Democrat Susana Mendoza defeated Munger in a special election for Illinois Comptroller. The normally low-key comptroller's race became a high-profile, big-budget campaign seen as a proxy battle between Democratic House Speaker Michael Madigan and Republican Gov. Bruce Rauner.

On February 3, 2017, Munger was hired as a staffer in the office of Governor Rauner with the title of deputy governor.

== Electoral history ==
Illinois House of Representatives 59th District Election, 2014
Party	Candidate	Votes	%
Democratic	Carol Sente (inc.)	14,528	52.4
Republican	Leslie Munger	13,179	47.6

Illinois Comptroller Election, 2016
Party	Candidate	Votes	%
Democratic	Susana Mendoza	2,583,436	49.0
Republican	Leslie Munger (inc.)	2,366,194	44.9

Party political offices
Preceded by Judy Baar Topinka	Republican nominee for Illinois Comptroller; 2016	Succeeded by Darlene Senger
Political offices
Preceded by Jerry Stermer	Comptroller of Illinois; 2015–2016	Succeeded by Susana Mendoza
