= Sheila Simon =

American politician

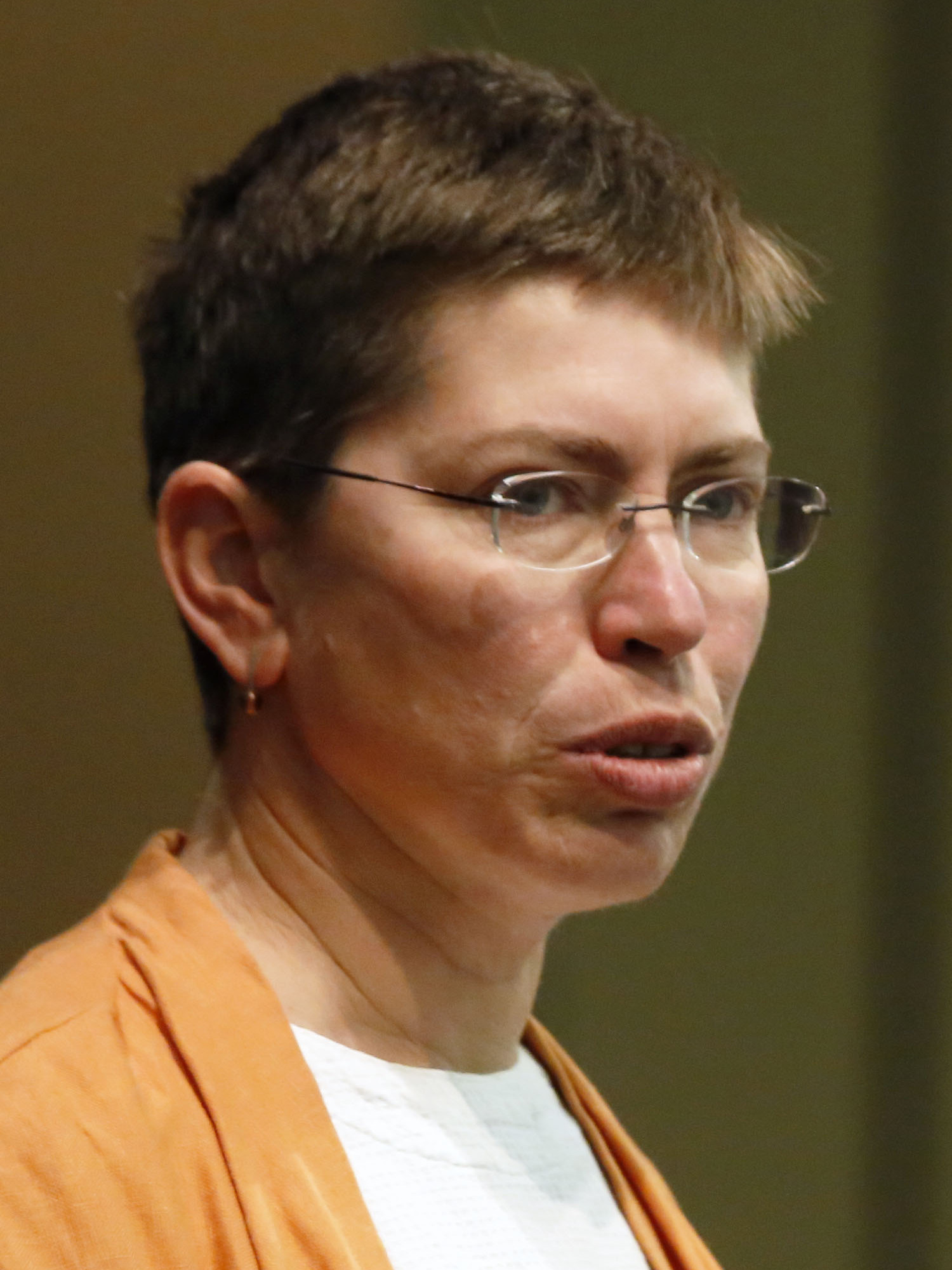
- Simon in 2015

46th Lieutenant Governor of Illinois
- In office January 10, 2011 – January 12, 2015
- Governor: Pat Quinn
- Preceded by: Pat Quinn (2009)
- Succeeded by: Evelyn Sanguinetti

Personal details
- Born: March 13, 1961 (age 65) Springfield, Illinois, U.S.
- Party: Democratic
- Spouse: Perry Knop (m. 1987)
- Children: 2
- Parent(s): Paul Simon; Jeanne Hurley
- Education: Wittenberg University (BA); Georgetown University (JD)

Sheila J. Simon (born March 13, 1961) is an American politician who served as the 46th lieutenant governor of Illinois, from 2011 to 2015. In 2014, she was the Democratic nominee for Illinois State Comptroller, losing to Republican incumbent Judy Baar Topinka. Simon is the daughter of former U.S. Senator Paul Simon, who had previously served as Lieutenant Governor of Illinois (1969–1973), and his first wife, former Illinois State Representative Jeanne Hurley Simon.

She currently serves as a professor of law at the Southern Illinois University School of Law.

== Education and pre-political career ==
Sheila Simon received a B.A. in 1983 from Wittenberg University and a J.D. in 1987 from Georgetown University Law Center. Following law school, she worked as a staff attorney at a legal aid clinic, the Land of Lincoln Legal Assistance Foundation from 1987 to 1992, providing legal services to indigent clients. She was an associate at the firm of O'Neill & Colvin in Carbondale, Illinois, from 1992 to 1994 and then served as an assistant state's attorney in Jackson County, Illinois from 1994 to 1998, where she prosecuted DUIs and domestic battery cases.

Simon is currently a law professor at Southern Illinois University Simmons Law School, and serves as the school’s Associate Dean. Along with several other attorneys and with the support of school faculty, Simon helped to inaugurate Southern Illinois University's law school domestic violence clinic in 1998. She worked as a clinical assistant professor at Southern Illinois University School of Law from 2000 to 2005 and was promoted to clinical associate professor in 2005.

== Political career ==
Simon was on the Carbondale city council from 2003 to 2007 and unsuccessfully ran for mayor of Carbondale in 2007. Subsequently, Governor Quinn selected her to serve on the Illinois Reform Commission, which helped to establish the first political contribution limits in Illinois law.

The Reform Commission consisted of 15 members from a wide variety of backgrounds, from attorneys, business owners, academics and even a football coach. The Commission issued a 100-day report after holding hearings across the state and examining ethics regulations in states across the country.

On October 28, 2019, State Treasurer Mike Frerichs nominated Simon to serve as a member of the Charitable Trust Stabilization Committee. The Illinois Senate confirmed Simon's appointment on May 26, 2021.

=== Lieutenant Governor of Illinois ===
On March 27, 2010, Illinois Democratic leaders, in the form of the 38-member Democratic State Central Committee, selected Simon to be Illinois Governor Pat Quinn's running mate in the November 2010 general election, despite her not appearing as a candidate in the original primary election, as the candidate for Lieutenant Governor of Illinois. Simon replaced Scott Lee Cohen on the ballot after Cohen, who won the February 2010 Democratic primary, withdrew amid controversies involving his personal life. Among potential candidates, Simon beat out Illinois State Rep. Art Turner, who had come in second in the primary to Cohen.

According to the Quinn/Simon campaign, the pairing of Gov. Quinn and Sheila Simon was appropriate, as the two worked together successfully in achieving the passage of campaign finance law, and have many shared goals and political viewpoints. Simon was sworn in on January 10, 2011.

=== State Senate campaign ===
On September 7, 2015, Simon announced her candidacy for the Illinois Senate seat being vacated by the retiring David Luechtefeld. Simon was defeated by her Republican opponent Paul Schimpf.

== Personal life ==
Simon and her husband, Perry Knop, were married in 1987. Knop is a Political Science professor and the Social Science department chair at John A. Logan College, the Carterville community college that serves the Carbondale area. In 2010, they had two daughters in college, and hosted a female exchange student from Peru. Simon has been in the band Loose Gravel for over ten years. She plays banjo and bassoon.

== See also ==
- List of female lieutenant governors in the United States

Party political offices
| Preceded by Pat Quinn | Democratic nominee for Lieutenant Governor of Illinois; 2010 | Succeeded by Paul Vallas |
| Preceded by David E. Miller | Democratic nominee for Illinois Comptroller; 2014 | Succeeded by Susana Mendoza |
Political offices
| Preceded by Pat Quinn | Lieutenant Governor of Illinois; 2011–2015 | Succeeded by Evelyn Sanguinetti |
