= Robert Pechous =

American politician

Member of the Illinois House of Representatives
- In office 1977–1983

Personal details
- Born: August 24, 1933 Berwyn, Illinois, U.S.
- Died: July 9, 2013 (aged 79) Berwyn, Illinois, U.S.
- Party: Democratic
- Education: Southern Illinois University (BA)

Military service
- Branch/service: United States Marine Corps
- Battles/wars: Korean War

Robert C. "Bob" Pechous (August 24, 1933 – July 9, 2013) was an American politician and educator.

== Early life ==
Born in Berwyn, Illinois, Pechous served in the United States Marine Corps during the Korean War. He then received his degree in political science from Southern Illinois University.

== Career ==
Before entering politics, Pechous worked as a teacher. Pechous was the Berwyn Township supervisor and Berwyn city clerk. He served in the Illinois House of Representatives from 1977 to 1983 as a Democrat. In 1992, he ran unsuccessfully for his old seat.

== Death ==
Pechous died in Berwyn, Illinois.
