= Leonard F. Becker =

American politician and businessman (1920–1991)

Leonard F. Becker (January 15, 1920 – May 4, 1991) was an American politician and businessman.

Becker was born in Chicago, Illinois. He served in the United States Army during World War II. Becker went to Roosevelt University. He worked at Western Electrical Company and lived in Cicero, Illinois. Becker served assistant director of the Illinois Department of Labor in 1977 and 1978. He served in the Illinois Senate from 1979 to 1985 and was a Republican. Becker died at Hinsdale Suburban Hospital in Hinsdale, Illinois.
