= Jerry Stermer =

American politician

8th Comptroller of Illinois
- In office December 19, 2014 – January 12, 2015
- Governor: Pat Quinn
- Preceded by: Judy Baar Topinka
- Succeeded by: Leslie Munger

Personal details
- Party: Democratic
- Education: Divine Word College (BA); University of Illinois (MA)

Jerome "Jerry" Stermer is an American Democratic politician who was appointed Comptroller of Illinois for a short period in late 2014 and early 2015, and was previously in many other Illinois state government positions and private political positions since the 1970s.

== Education ==
Stermer attended Divine Word Missionaries, a Catholic seminary in Epworth, Iowa: According to Voices for Illinois Children, of which he was the first president, he "completed his bachelor's degree in liberal arts"; his 2012 state resume says that he received his bachelor's degree in English in 1966.

He received his master's degree in political science from the University of Illinois in 1982.

== Career ==
Stermer was a Peace Corps volunteer in Ecuador from 1968 to 1970.

He was in the Illinois Department of Children and Family Services from 1973 to 1979, eventually becoming Assistant to the Director. He was Executive Director of the Legislative Advisory Committee on Public Aid for the Illinois General Assembly from 1979 to 1985. He was Supervisor of Government Affairs for the Legal Assistance Foundation of Chicago, the Chicago area's main legal aid in the United States organization.

He became an adjunct professor for the Northwestern University School of Education and Social Policy in 2002.

In 1987, he became the first president of Voices for Illinois Children, a lobbying organization. His 2012 Illinois state biography says he was president of the organization until 2002; according to the Voices for Illinois Children website he was president until 2009.

=== Appointments by Pat Quinn ===
Stermer and Pat Quinn have known each other since the Dan Walker administration in the 1970s.

Stermer became chief of staff for Pat Quinn, Governor of Illinois, in 2009. In January 2010, Stermer reported to the Executive Inspector General that Stermer had been sent three political e-mails from Pat Quinn's campaign staff and replied to them from state e-mail, out of 39,000 e-mails examined. In one instance, Quinn's brother, Thomas Quinn, sent campaign e-mail several private accounts, but accidentally includedSterner's state e-mail in the list, then left Sterner voice mail saying to "ignore that e-mail". The inspector general's report on the e-mails was delivered to the governor's office on August 12. On the morning of August 13, James Wright was dismissed as Executive Inspector General; Quinn had already told staff on July 23 that James Wright would be replaced by former federal prosecutor Ricardo Meza. Pat Quinn said that he and his staff did not know the contents of Wright's report until the evening of August 13, and "It took them seven months to provide the report. I had no idea when it would arrive." At the time, Quinn was considered very vulnerable in the 2010 election against Republican Bill Brady, and Stermer resigned just before the inspector's general report was made public in late August, in order to minimize harm to Quinn's chances of winning. Stermer also paid a $500 fine.

After the November 2010 election, in which Quinn narrowly defeated Brady, Stermer was brought back as a "senior advisor" to Quinn, with his first week unpaid as a disciplinary measure for the earlier violations as chief of staff. He remained a senior advisor from 2010 until being appointed Acting Director of the Governor's Office of Management and Budget on April 2, 2012.

The Comptroller of Illinois, Judy Baar Topinka, died on December 10, 2014, a month after her re-election but while still serving out her first term. Pat Quinn appointed Stermer, who was still the governor's budget director, to the position of Comptroller on December 19, 2014, saying that Stermer would step aside when statewide officers' new terms begin on January 12, 2015.

On January 12, 2015, Leslie Munger, appointee of incoming Republican governor Bruce Rauner, took the oath of office for Comptroller in the same event as Rauner.

Political offices
| Preceded by Judy Baar Topinka | Comptroller of Illinois; 2014–2015 | Succeeded by Leslie Munger |
