= Illinois Comptroller =

U.S. state constitutional officer position

Comptroller of Illinois
- Seal of the State of Illinois

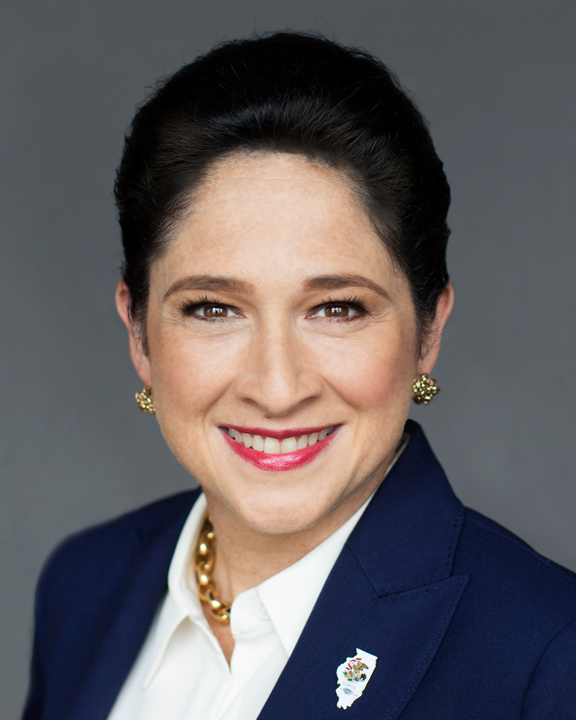
- Incumbent; Susana Mendoza since December 5, 2016
- Style: Mister or Madam Comptroller (informal); The Honorable (formal)
- Member of: Board of Trustees of the State Employees' Retirement System
- Seat: Illinois State Capitol; Springfield, Illinois
- Appointer: General election
- Term length: Four years, no term limits
- Inaugural holder: George W. Lindberg
- Formation: December 15, 1970 (55 years ago)
- Succession: Fourth
- Salary: $135,669 (2016)
- Website: Official page

The Comptroller of Illinois is a constitutional officer in the executive branch of government of the U.S. state of Illinois. Ten individuals have held the office of Comptroller since the enactment of the Illinois Constitution of 1970, replacing the prior office of Auditor of Public Accounts that was first created in 1799. The incumbent is Susana Mendoza, a Democrat.

== Eligibility and term of office ==
The Comptroller is elected for a renewable four-year term during the quadrennial mid-term election. The Illinois Constitution provides that the Comptroller must, at the time of their election, be a United States citizen, at least 25 years old, and a resident of the state for at least 3 years preceding the election.

== Powers and duties ==
Article V, Section 17 of the Constitution of Illinois states the Comptroller "...shall maintain the State's central fiscal accounts, and order payments into and out of the funds held by the Treasurer." In accordance with this mandate, the Comptroller is designated by law as the chief fiscal control officer for the state of Illinois and thus responsible for the legal, efficient, and effective financial operations of state government. As such, the Comptroller:

1. Prescribes uniform accounting standards, records financial transactions, codifies appropriations made by law, and makes adjustments in the statewide accounting system.
2. Establishes internal control guidelines applicable to every state agency.
3. Orders deposits into the state treasury and approves receipts issued by the Treasurer.
4. Audits vouchers certified by state agencies for obligations incurred, including obligations made by the state to its employees and creditors, and issues warrants on the state treasury in payment of vouchers approved, either by signing paychecks or granting approval to electronic payments.
5. Administers payroll to state employees.
6. Maintains records of inventory and bonded indebtedness for every state agency.
7. Monitors cash flow in each state fund and approves interfund transfers.
8. Provides monthly debt transparency reports to the General Assembly.
9. Prepares the state's annual comprehensive financial report. (Note: The basic financial statements and disclosures contained within the annual comprehensive financial report are prepared in accordance with generally accepted accounting principles promulgated by the Governmental Accounting Standards Board.)
10. Approves or refuses the sale of state bonds in excess of statutory debt limits. Illinois state agencies, as a matter of law, cannot generally incur debt in excess of sums appropriated by the General Assembly. In practice however, state agencies can incur debt beyond these statutory limits if the resulting bonds are authorized by the Governor and approved by the Comptroller. If approved, said bonds are issued by the Office of Management and Budget, a Cabinet-level state agency, and serviced as to principal and interest by the Treasurer. No other elected state comptroller in the United States enjoys this power over bond issuance. (Note: The other states with elected comptrollers are California, Connecticut, Florida, Idaho, Indiana, Maryland, Nevada, New York, South Carolina, Texas, and Wyoming.)

The Comptroller is charged by statute with certain additional duties. In particular, the Comptroller supervises local government finances throughout Illinois. This function includes reviewing localities' financial statements, collecting financial data and organizing it into user-friendly databases, investigating instances of waste or fraud in local governments, and publishing an annual report summarizing the revenues, expenditures, fund balance, and debt of some 9,000 units of local government. Moreover, the Comptroller regulates cemeteries under the Cemetery Care Act, and is charged with the fiduciary protection of cemetery care funds used for the care and maintenance of Illinois gravesites.

Aside from their regular responsibilities, the Comptroller is fourth (behind the Lieutenant Governor, Attorney General, and Secretary of State, respectively) in the line of succession to the office of Governor of Illinois. The Comptroller is also by law a member of the board of trustees of the State Employees' Retirement System (SERS), the independent state agency that administers public pensions for legislators and their staff, the judiciary, executive branch officials, and the professional civil service.

== Recent history ==
The late Judy Baar Topinka was a moderate Republican first elected in 2010 and subsequently re-elected in 2014 to a second four-year term as Comptroller. However, Topinka died unexpectedly in December 2014. On December 19, Governor Pat Quinn appointed Jerry Stermer to succeed Topinka, to serve until January 12, 2015, when he was replaced by Leslie Munger, who was appointed by Quinn's successor as governor, Bruce Rauner. Munger was then defeated by Susana Mendoza in the 2016 special election to fill the remainder of the term through 2018.

== Merger proposals ==
Some legislators have perceived a redundancy overlap between the offices of Comptroller and Treasurer, and have therefore proposed constitutional amendments to merge the two offices and earn administrative savings. For example, HJRCA 12, considered by the Illinois General Assembly in the 2008-2009 session, would merge the office of Comptroller into the office of Treasurer.

In 2011, Comptroller Topinka and the Treasurer, Dan Rutherford, introduced legislation to allow voters to decide whether the offices should be merged. The legislation was opposed by Michael Madigan, Speaker of the Illinois House of Representatives, and did not become law.

== List of office holders ==
The following is an historic list of office holders for the Comptroller of Illinois and its preceding office, the Auditor of Public Accounts.

=== Auditors of Public Accounts, Northwest Territory ===
- Rice Bullock (1799–1800)

=== Auditors of Public Accounts, Indiana Territory ===
- vacant (1801–1809)

=== Auditors of Public Accounts, Illinois Territory ===
- vacant (1809–1812)

#	Name	Term	Political Party
1	H. H. Maxwell	1812-1816	
2	Daniel Pope Cook	1816	Democratic-Republican
3	Robert Blackwell	1817	
4	Elijah C. Berry	1817–1818	

=== Auditors of Public Accounts, State of Illinois ===
#	Name	Political Party	Term
1	Elijah C. Berry	Democratic	1818–1831
2	James T. B. Stapp	Democratic	1831–1835
3	Levi Davis	Whig	1835–1841
4	James Shields	Democratic	1841–1843
5	William L. D. Ewing	Democratic	1843–1846
6	Thomas Hayes Campbell	Democratic	1846–1857
7	Jesse K. Dubois	Republican	1857–1864
8	Orlin H. Miner	Republican	1864–1869
9	Charles E. Lippincott	Republican	1869–1877
10	Thomas B. Needles	Republican	1877–1881
11	Charles P. Swigart	Republican	1881–1889
12	Charles W. Pavey	Republican	1889–1893
13	David Gore	Democratic	1893–1897
14	James S. McCullough	Republican	1897–1913
15	James J. Brady	Democratic	1913–1917
16	Andrew Russell	Republican	1917–1925
17	Oscar Nelson	Republican	1925–1933
18	Edward J. Barrett	Democratic	1933–1941
19	Arthur C. Lueder	Republican	1941–1949
20	Benjamin O. Cooper	Democratic	1949–1953
21	Orville E. Hodge	Republican	1953–1956
22	Lloyd Morey	Republican	1956–1957
23	Elbert S. Smith	Republican	1957–1961
24	Michael J. Howlett	Democratic	1961–1973

=== Comptrollers, State of Illinois ===
#	Name	Political Party	Term
1	George W. Lindberg	Republican	1973–1977
2	Michael J. Bakalis	Democratic	1977–1979
3	Roland W. Burris	Democratic	1979–1991
4	Dawn Clark Netsch	Democratic	1991–1995
5	Loleta A. Didrickson	Republican	1995–1999
6	Dan Hynes	Democratic	1999–2011
7	Judy Baar Topinka	Republican	2011–2014
8	Jerry Stermer	Democratic	2014–2015
9	Leslie Munger	Republican	2015–2016
10	Susana Mendoza	Democratic	2016–present
