= Rod Blagojevich =

Governor of Illinois from 2003 to 2009

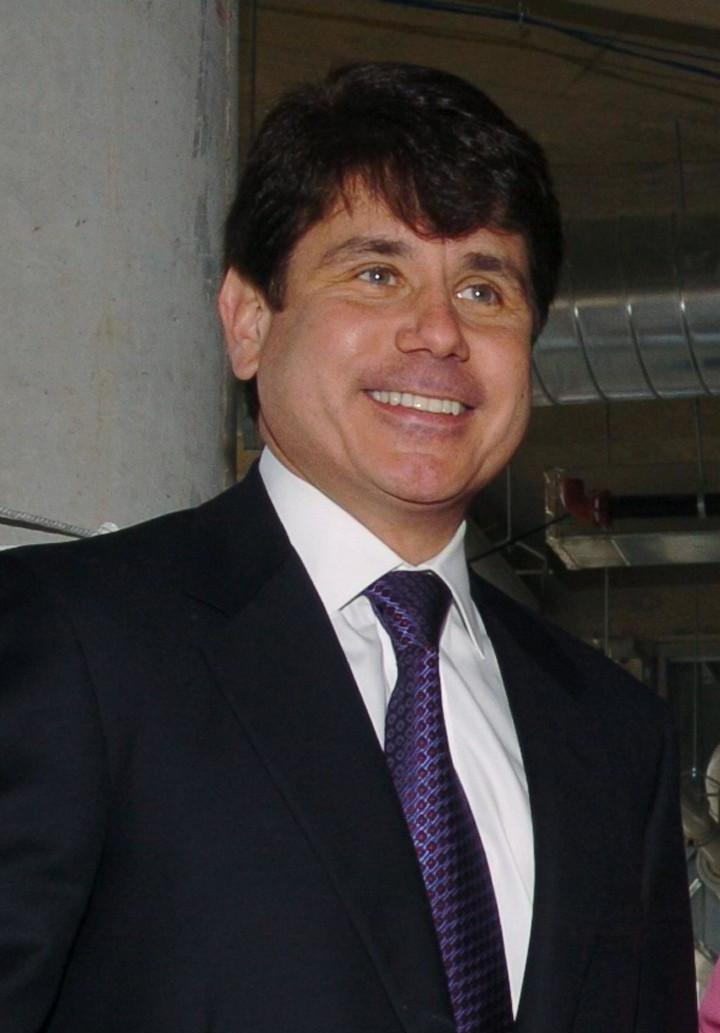
- Blagojevich in 2007

40th Governor of Illinois
- In office January 13, 2003 – January 29, 2009
- Lieutenant: Pat Quinn
- Preceded by: George Ryan
- Succeeded by: Pat Quinn

Member of the U.S. House of Representatives from Illinois's 5th district
- In office January 3, 1997 – January 3, 2003
- Preceded by: Michael Flanagan
- Succeeded by: Rahm Emanuel

Member of the Illinois House of Representatives from the 33rd district
- In office January 6, 1993 – January 3, 1997
- Preceded by: Myron Kulas
- Succeeded by: John Fritchey

Personal details
- Born: December 10, 1956 (age 69) Chicago, Illinois, U.S.
- Party: Democratic
- Spouse: Patti Mell (m. 1990)
- Children: 2
- Education: University of Tampa (attended); Northwestern University (BA); Pepperdine University (JD)
- Criminal information
- Status: Was incarcerated at the Federal Correctional Institution, Englewood; Sentence commuted February 18, 2020, by President Donald Trump
- Convictions: Wire fraud (10 counts); Bribery (3 counts); Extortion (4 counts); Making false statements
- Penalty: Served nearly 8 years of a 14 year sentence; commuted 2020, pardoned 2025

Rod R. Blagojevich (/bləˈɡɔɪ.əvɪtʃ/ blə-GOY-ə-vitch; born December 10, 1956), often referred to by his nickname "Blago", is an American politician who served as the 40th governor of Illinois from 2003 to 2009. A member of the Democratic Party, Blagojevich previously worked in both the state and federal legislatures. He served as an Illinois state representative from 1993 to 1997, and the U.S. representative from Illinois's 5th district from 1997 to 2003.

Born and raised in Chicago, Blagojevich graduated from Northwestern University in 1979 and the Pepperdine University School of Law in 1983. After graduating, he became a criminal prosecutor at the Cook County State's Attorney Office during the late 1980s. Turning to elective politics, he represented the 33rd state house district in the Illinois House of Representatives where he supported mostly law and order policies. Forgoing a third two-year term in the state legislature, he represented Illinois's 5th congressional district for six years, winning re-election twice. He was elected governor in 2002, becoming the first Democrat to win the office since 1972. During his first term, the state increased education spending, launched a $5.3 billion rebuilding program for the Illinois Tollway, expanded health coverage, and enacted ethics and criminal-justice reforms. Blagojevich was reelected to a second term in 2006. His administration subsequently expanded preschool, signed a statewide smoking ban and renewable-energy standard, and continued efforts to broaden health coverage, while repeated budget disputes and changes to pension funding contributed to growing conflict with the General Assembly.

In December 2008, a federal investigation led to Blagojevich's arrest on corruption charges after he attempted to sell the U.S. Senate seat vacated by Barack Obama upon his election to the presidency. Shortly after his arrest, Blagojevich was impeached and removed from office by the Illinois General Assembly. He was also barred by the Illinois Senate's judgement from holding public office in the state again. In June 2011, Blagojevich was convicted in a federal criminal trial for his role in the corruption scandal, and was sentenced to 14 years in federal prison. President Donald Trump formally commuted his sentence in 2020, after Blagojevich had been imprisoned for nearly eight years, and fully pardoned him in 2025. Blagojevich had previously been a contestant on Trump's reality series The Celebrity Apprentice. Blagojevich subsequently supported Trump's 2020 and 2024 presidential campaigns, and attended the 2024 Republican National Convention. He has since described himself as a "Trumpocrat".

To date, Blagojevich is the only Illinois governor to be successfully impeached and removed from office.

== Early life ==
Rod Blagojevich was born in Chicago, Illinois, the second of two sons of Serb immigrants from FPR Yugoslavia. His father, Rade B. Blagojevich, was an immigrant steel plant laborer from a village near Kragujevac, PR Serbia. His mother, Mila, was a Herzegovinian Serb whose family was originally from Gacko, PR Bosnia and Herzegovina. His parents moved to Chicago in 1947. He grew up on the Northwest Side of Chicago. Blagojevich's older brother Rob worked as a fund-raiser for Blagojevich in his later political career. Blagojevich spent much of his childhood working odd jobs to help the family pay its bills. He was a shoeshiner and pizza delivery boy before working at a meatpacking plant. In order to afford university costs, Blagojevich worked for the Trans-Alaska Pipeline System as a dishwasher.

Blagojevich does not have a middle name, but uses the initial "R" in honor of his deceased father. His nickname in the family was "Milorad", which some have mistakenly thought to be his name at birth.

Blagojevich graduated from Chicago's Foreman High School after transferring from Lane Technical High School. He played basketball in high school, and participated in two fights after training as a Golden Gloves boxer. After graduation, he enrolled at the University of Tampa. After two years, he transferred to Northwestern University in suburban Evanston, where he graduated in 1979 with a B.A. in history. He earned his J.D. from the Pepperdine University School of Law in 1983. He later said of the experience: "I went to law school at a place called Pepperdine in Malibu, California, overlooking the Pacific Ocean — a lot of surfing and movie stars and all the rest. I barely knew where that law library was."

== Early career ==
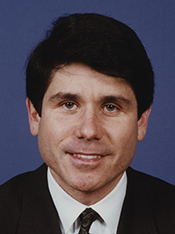
Portrait as a member of the U.S. House of Representatives, 1997–2003

=== Prosecutor ===
Blagojevich clerked for Chicago Alderman Edward Vrdolyak. Blagojevich then took a job as Cook County Assistant State's Attorney (assistant prosecutor) under State's Attorney Richard M. Daley, specializing in domestic abuse crimes and felony weapons cases.

=== State and federal legislator ===
In 1992, with the backing of his influential father-in-law, Blagojevich unseated 14-year incumbent Myron Kulas in the Democratic primary for the 33rd state house district, in the Illinois House of Representatives, which includes part of Chicago's North Side. As is the case with most state legislative elections in Chicago, this virtually assured him of election in November. He drew on his experiences as a prosecutor to draft bills that he argued would strengthen the state's judicial system and reduce crime.

In 1996, Blagojevich did not seek reelection to the statehouse but instead ran for Illinois's 5th congressional district, based on the North Side. The district had long been represented by Dan Rostenkowski, who served as chairman of the House Ways and Means Committee. Rostenkowski lost reelection in 1994 to Republican Michael Patrick Flanagan after pleading guilty to mail fraud. However, Flanagan was a conservative Republican representing a heavily Democratic district and was regarded as a heavy underdog. Blagojevich soundly defeated Flanagan by a nearly 2-to-1 margin, with support from his father-in-law. He was elected two more times, taking 74% against a nominal Republican challenger in 1998 and having only a Libertarian opponent in 2000.

Blagojevich was not known as a particularly active congressman. In the late 1990s, he traveled with Jesse Jackson to Belgrade in the Federal Republic of Yugoslavia to negotiate with President Slobodan Milošević for the release of American prisoners of war.

On October 10, 2002, Blagojevich was one of 81 House Democrats, and one of only two from Illinois (the other being David D. Phelps), who voted in favor of authorizing the invasion of Iraq.

== Gubernatorial campaigns ==
=== 2002 election ===
During 2002, Blagojevich campaigned for his party's nomination to become governor. Blagojevich won a close primary campaign against former Illinois Attorney General Roland Burris and Chicago Public Schools Superintendent Paul Vallas, who ran well in the suburban collar counties of Chicago. Contemporary reports placed the result at about 37% for Blagojevich, 34% for Vallas and 29% for Burris. Blagojevich finished strongly in Southern Illinois, taking 55% there and 56% of the vote downstate, enough to overcome Vallas's advantage in suburban Cook County and the collar counties and win the primary by a thin margin. His campaign combined support from organized labor and downstate party organizations with months of television advertising; some of the advertisements emphasized his immigrant family background and appeal to working families.

During the primary, state Senator Barack Obama backed Burris but, at Burris's suggestion, supported Blagojevich after he won the primary, serving as an adviser for the general election. Future Obama senior adviser David Axelrod had previously advised Blagojevich, but grew disenchanted with him and ended the relationship before Blagojevich assembled the team that ran his gubernatorial campaign. According to Rahm Emanuel, he, Obama, Blagojevich's campaign co-chair David Wilhelm, and another Blagojevich staffer met regularly during the 2002 race to discuss campaign strategy. Wilhelm later said that Emanuel had overstated the group's role. After the primary, Chicago mayor Richard M. Daley joined the campaign as a chairman, while the Illinois AFL–CIO and the state Fraternal Order of Police backed the Blagojevich–Quinn ticket.

In the general election, Blagojevich defeated Republican Illinois Attorney General Jim Ryan. Blagojevich's campaign was helped by his well-connected father-in-law, Chicago alderman Richard Mell. Ethics scandals had plagued the previous administration of Republican George Ryan (no relation to Jim Ryan), and Blagojevich's campaign focused on the theme of "ending business as usual" in state government. Polls prior to the election found that many Illinois voters were confused about the names of George Ryan and Jim Ryan, a fact which Blagojevich used to his advantage. An August Chicago Tribune poll summarized by Illinois Issues showed Blagojevich ahead by 17 percentage points; when respondents were explicitly reminded that Jim Ryan and George Ryan were different people, the lead narrowed to ten points. By the end of June, the campaigns had spent similar amounts over the preceding year, but Blagojevich retained about $3.8 million in cash compared with about $690,000 for Ryan. Blagojevich asked, "How can you replace one Ryan with another Ryan and call that change? You want change? Elect a guy named Blagojevich."

Blagojevich won with 52% of the vote over Jim Ryan. On election night, he said: "Tonight, ladies and gentlemen, Illinois has voted for change."

=== 2006 reelection ===
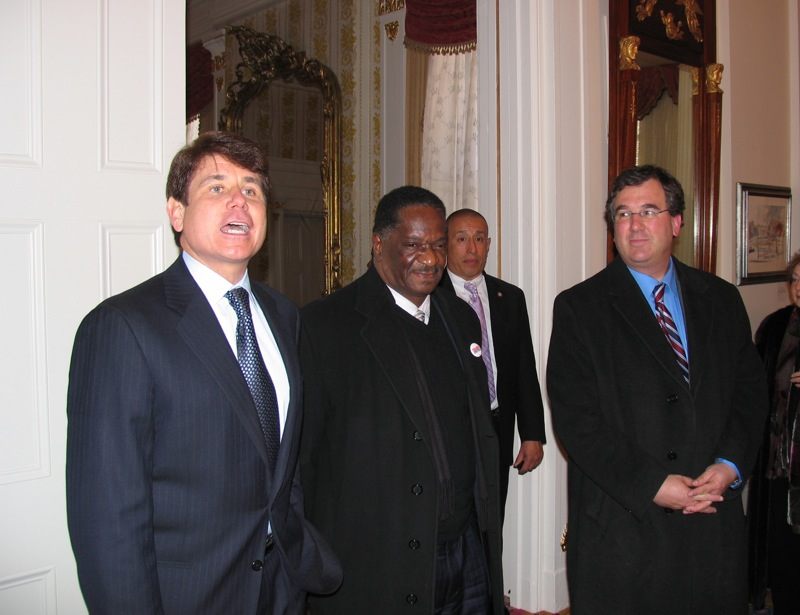
Blagojevich (left) with Emil Jones (center) and Jeffrey Schoenberg (right) at the Illinois Executive Mansion for a luncheon after Barack Obama launched his 2008 campaign in 2007

From 2005 to 2006, Blagojevich served as federal liaison for the Democratic Governors Association. In March 2005, Blagojevich was elected chair of the Midwestern Governors Association by the other governors in the organization and served a one-year term.

Amid controversies surrounding his administration, Blagojevich's approval rating fell as low as 36 percent, with 56 percent disapproving near the end of 2005. By early 2006, five Republicans campaigned in the primary for the right to challenge him in the general election, with state treasurer Judy Baar Topinka eventually winning the nomination. Federal investigators were also examining hiring practices in the Blagojevich administration, and Eisendrath made the governor's credibility and allegations involving campaign contributors, state jobs and contracts central themes of his primary challenge.

Blagojevich formally began his 2006 reelection campaign for Governor of Illinois on February 19, 2006. He won the Democratic primary on March 21 with 70.84% of the vote against challenger Edwin Eisendrath, who received 29.16%. During the primary, Blagojevich declined an invitation from WTTW to appear jointly with Eisendrath for a televised discussion. He convinced Democratic state senator James Meeks not to launch a third-party campaign by promising to attempt to lease out the state lottery to provide education funding. A University of Illinois policy analysis published the following year said that the proposal was widely interpreted at the time as an effort to dissuade Meeks from entering the race, while noting that Blagojevich did not publicly acknowledge such an arrangement and that the proposed lottery sale received relatively little attention during the general-election campaign.

Blagojevich was endorsed by many Democratic leaders (with the notable exception of Attorney General Lisa Madigan, who claimed it was a conflict of interest since her office was investigating him), including then-Illinois Senator Barack Obama, who endorsed the governor in early 2005 and spoke on his behalf at the August 2006 Illinois State Fair. Blagojevich was also endorsed by the state's Sierra Club. He was described at the time as the only Illinois governor ever endorsed by the organization. The union American Federation of State, County and Municipal Employees declined to endorse Blagojevich for reelection, citing the 500 jobs he eliminated from the Illinois Department of Natural Resources, which left some state parks unsupervised. The Illinois Education Association likewise declined to endorse a gubernatorial candidate that year.

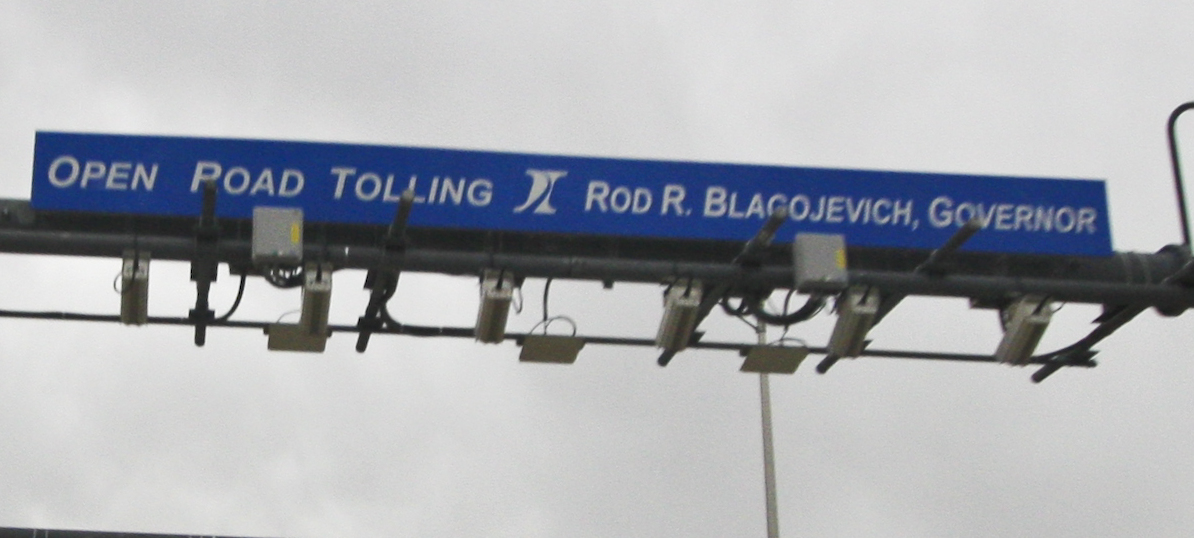
Sign reading "Open Road Tolling Rod R. Blagojevich, Governor"

In 2004, Blagojevich had ordered the Illinois Tollway to erect 32 signs at a cost of $480,000, announcing "Open Road Tolling. Rod R. Blagojevich, Governor." In 2006, the signs were criticized for serving as campaign signs and costing significantly more than the common $200 signs.

In the general election, Blagojevich defeated Topinka and the Green Party's Rich Whitney, outspending Topinka $27 million to $6 million. At the end of June, Blagojevich's campaign reported about $12.2 million on hand, compared with about $1.5 million for Topinka; Whitney's campaign reported $860 on hand at the same point. Blagojevich attempted to tie Topinka to former Republican governor George Ryan's corruption. Topinka's campaign emphasized the federal investigation into the Blagojevich administration and his lack of support from some prominent Democrats, including Lisa Madigan. A September Chicago Tribune poll reported by Illinois Issues put Blagojevich at 45%, Topinka at 33% and Whitney at 6%, while finding no candidate with a clear advantage among voters asked who could clean up state government. A three-term state treasurer, Topinka said that she had attempted to stop Blagojevich from using money from special funds for general expenditures without approval of the legislature; she said Blagojevich used the funds for projects meant to distract voters from his associates' corruption trials: "This constant giving away of money ... a million here, a million there, it raids our already hamstrung government and deadbeat state." Topinka's spokesman claimed that Blagojevich was the most investigated governor in Illinois history. Topinka lost to Blagojevich by a margin of more than ten percentage points. Blagojevich received 49.8% of the vote, Topinka 39.3%, and Whitney 10.4%.

== Governor of Illinois (2003–2009) ==
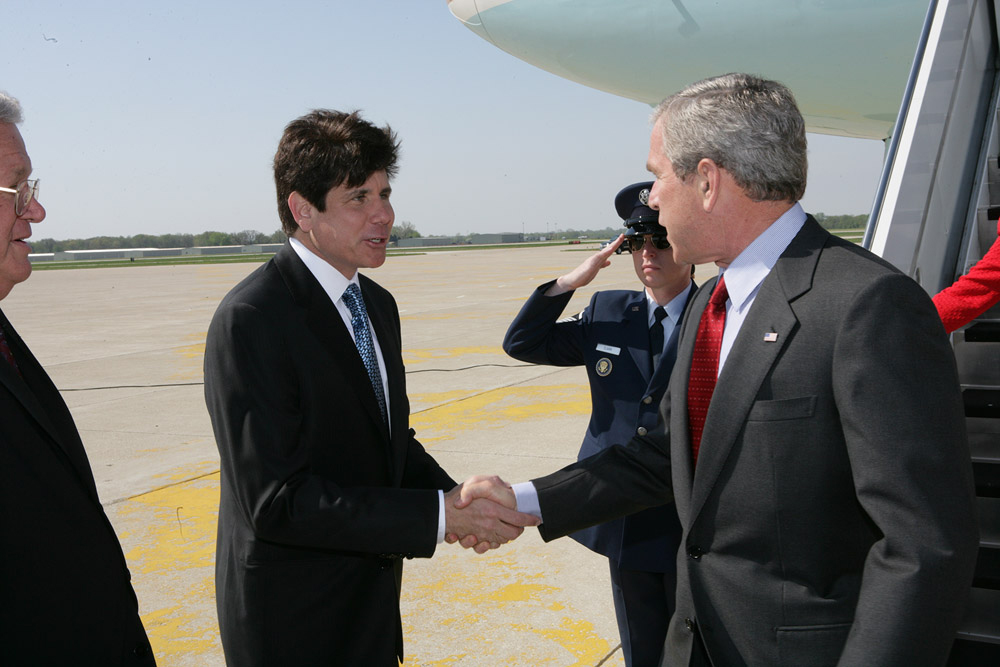
Blagojevich greeting President George W. Bush in 2005

After the 2002 elections, Democrats had control of the Illinois House, Senate, and all but one statewide office. While in office, Blagojevich signed progressive legislation including ethics reform, death penalty reform, a state Earned Income Tax Credit, a statewide comprehensive smoking ban and expansions of health programs such as KidCare, FamilyCare and All Kids. He signed a 2005 amendment to the Illinois Human Rights Act prohibiting discrimination based on sexual orientation, a definition that included gender identity, in employment, housing, public accommodations and credit. Other legislation signed during his governorship raised the state minimum wage, established a renewable-energy standard, and created the Biometric Information Privacy Act, which regulated private collection and use of biometric identifiers. Blagojevich originally campaigned against pork barrel spending, but eventually used it himself to gain more votes for bills.

Soon after taking office in 2003, Blagojevich continued support of a moratorium on executions of death row inmates. His predecessor, George Ryan, had commuted the sentences of everyone on Illinois's death row shortly before leaving office, and Blagojevich said in April 2003 that he would not lift the moratorium until he believed the system had been sufficiently reformed. The moratorium remained in place throughout his administration.

Another notable action of his first year was the enactment of the State Officials and Employees Ethics Act. The law restricted political activity on state time, tightened gift rules, required ethics training and employee time sheets, prohibited retaliation against whistleblowers, and created executive ethics oversight and inspector-general mechanisms. When campaigning for re-election in 2006, Blagojevich said that if his ethics law had existed when former governor George Ryan had been in office, Ryan's corruption might not have occurred. Illinois also enacted a broad package of death-penalty reforms in 2003, drawing in part on recommendations from the commission appointed by Ryan and co-chaired by former U.S. senator Paul Simon. The General Assembly overrode an amendatory veto by Blagojevich on one of the principal measures; the reforms included tighter standards for capital cases and expanded protections intended to reduce wrongful convictions. Labor unions and African Americans were Blagojevich's staunchest political supporters. In 2008, he told a group of African-Americans that he sometimes considered himself the first African American governor of Illinois.

=== Education ===
Blagojevich oversaw annual increases in state education appropriations without raising the general income or sales tax rates. His administration said that the first three years of his term included $2.3 billion in new school funding, while his fiscal year 2007 proposal called for another $400 million increase for K–12 education. He was criticized by Republicans and many moderate Democrats for helping finance other spending by reducing scheduled state pension contributions. In 2006, Blagojevich proposed "Preschool for All", an expansion intended eventually to make publicly funded preschool available to every three- and four-year-old in Illinois. Legislation authorizing the program was adopted as part of the fiscal year 2007 budget, with an initial $45 million increase intended to add roughly 10,000 preschool slots. By 2008, NPR Illinois reported that the state ranked first nationally in the share of three-year-olds served by state-funded preschool, although demand for grants continued to exceed available funding.

=== Proposed capital programs ===
Blagojevich's administration undertook a major rebuilding program for the Illinois Tollway. In 2004, the Tollway adopted a $5.3 billion Congestion-Relief Program to reconstruct much of the system, widen roads, extend Interstate 355 and convert mainline toll plazas to open road tolling. Separately, on January 10, 2006, Blagojevich announced a $3 billion proposal for roads, mass transit and schools, to be financed in part through new gambling revenues, including Keno and lottery games. The proposal met immediate opposition from Republicans and many Democrats, who described it as an election-year proposal, and the Keno component was later withdrawn. The larger question of a statewide capital plan remained unresolved through most of Blagojevich's tenure.

In March 2008, Blagojevich announced a bipartisan coalition, chaired by former U.S. House speaker Dennis Hastert and Southern Illinois University president and former U.S. representative Glenn Poshard, to develop a capital construction plan that could pass the Illinois General Assembly. The Illinois Works Coalition toured the state and developed proposals that combined road, bridge, school and transit construction with financing from the state lottery, road funds and, in some versions, expanded gambling. A $34 billion version passed the Senate but stalled in the Illinois House; Blagojevich and the coalition later proposed a smaller package that removed expanded gambling as a funding source. Earlier that year, Blagojevich had also signed a separate Chicago-area transit funding package after the Chicago Transit Authority warned of large service cuts and layoffs; at his insistence, the legislation included free fixed-route transit rides for Illinois residents aged 65 and older.

=== Special sessions ===
Blagojevich called the Illinois General Assembly into special session 36 times while in office, about half of all special sessions called in the state since 1970. The sessions became especially frequent during the prolonged 2007 budget dispute. Legislators complained that repeated calls disrupted their schedules and that Blagojevich sometimes did not attend the sessions himself. The 2007 impasse extended well beyond the scheduled end of the legislative session and became intertwined with disputes over Blagojevich's proposed health-care expansion, business taxes and capital spending.

=== Relationships with lawmakers ===
Blagojevich disagreed with many state Democrats while in office, with House and Senate Republican leaders Frank Watson and Tom Cross at times finding themselves between competing Democratic factions. His most consequential dispute was with House Speaker Michael Madigan, and the breakdown between the governor and legislative leaders increasingly limited his ability to enact major proposals during his second term. During 2008, Blagojevich even expressed fear that House Democrats would gain more seats and he would face more opposition.

Blagojevich and his lieutenant governor Pat Quinn publicly disagreed over Blagojevich's proposed Gross Receipts Tax to increase revenue for schools, health care and other projects within Illinois. After Blagojevich's arrest, Quinn said that the two had last spoken to each other in the summer of 2007. Blagojevich also feuded with Attorney General Lisa Madigan, Comptroller Dan Hynes, Secretary of State Jesse White, and state treasurer Alexi Giannoulias — all of whom are Democrats.

Blagojevich was often at odds with members of both parties in the state legislature. Democratic state representative Jack Franks said that the reason Blagojevich had problems passing laws with the cooperation of the General Assembly was that he did not spend enough time with the legislature. "That's a real reason he has such poor relations with the Legislature and can't get any of his agenda passed, because he doesn't talk to anybody." When lawmakers working on a budget during a special session met at 10 am rather than 2 pm, and Blagojevich's attorney threatened that the governor was considering legal action against the involved representatives, Democratic state representative Joe Lyons told reporters, "We have a madman. The man is insane." NPR Illinois similarly described legislative leaders in 2007 as increasingly negotiating among themselves rather than with the governor.

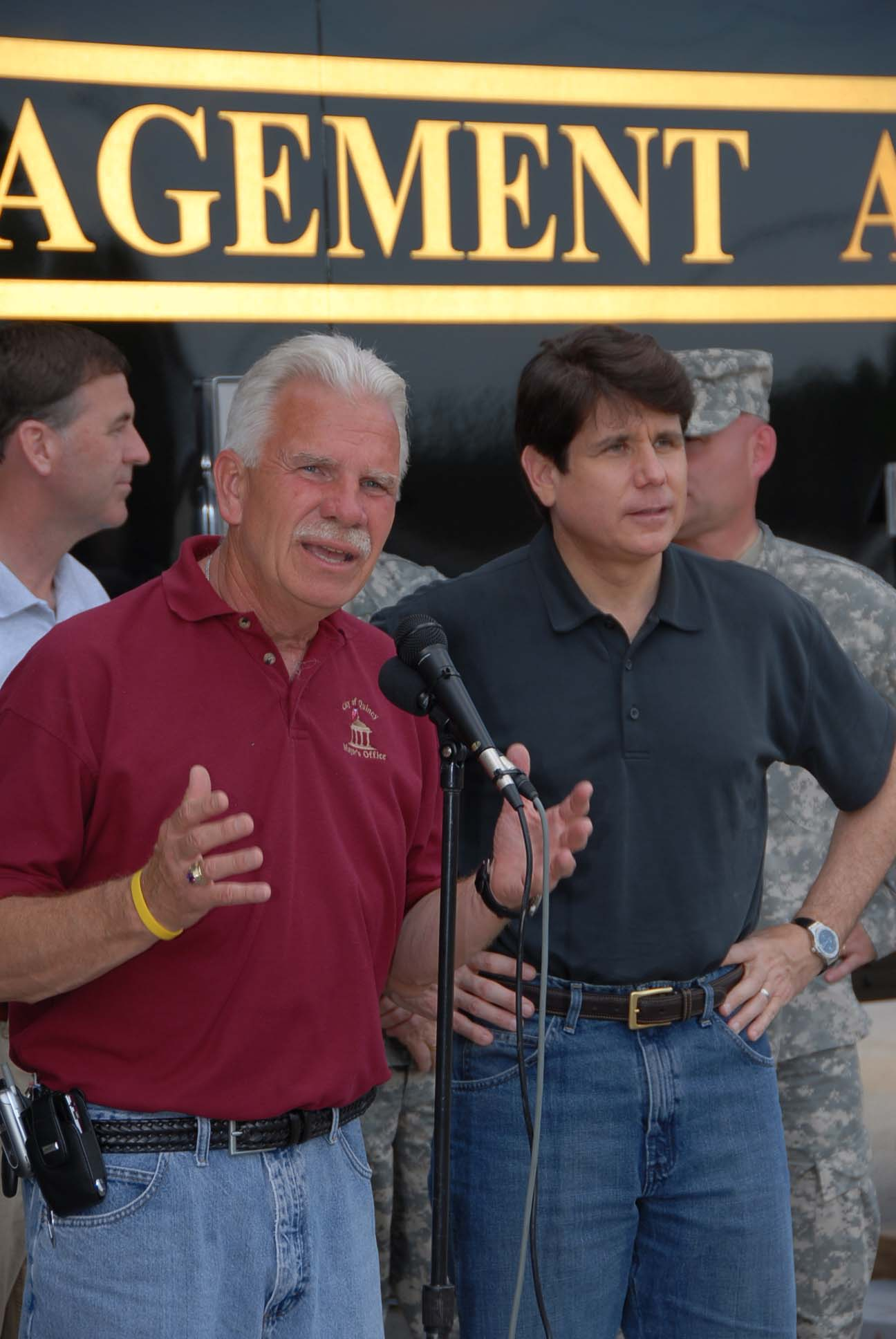
Quincy Mayor John Spring appears at a press conference with Blagojevich to discuss Mississippi River flood-relief efforts in 2008.

Although Barack Obama served as an adviser to Blagojevich's 2002 gubernatorial campaign, by all accounts, Blagojevich and Obama had been estranged for years by the end of Blagojevich's governorship. Blagojevich did not endorse Obama in the 2004 United States Senate race, and Obama did not invite Blagojevich to speak at the 2008 Democratic National Convention, as he did Lisa Madigan, Hynes, and Giannoulias. Blagojevich had a "friendly rapport" with the man who took over his congressional seat, Rahm Emanuel.

Blagojevich also disagreed publicly with Chicago Mayor Richard M. Daley; after their dispute over Chicago Transit Authority funding, Daley called Blagojevich "cuckoo" and said he did not want to argue with the Governor since "he's arguing with everybody in America." Blagojevich replied, "I don't think I'm cuckoo."

Soon after a meeting in 2007 with Democratic state senator Mike Jacobs, meant to convince Jacobs to vote for Blagojevich's health insurance proposals, Jacobs emerged telling reporters that the governor "blew up at him like a 10-year-old child" and threatened to ruin his political career; Blagojevich would not comment on the alleged incident. Jacobs said in 2008: "This is a governor who I don't think has a single ally, except for Senate president Emil Jones — and that's tenuous at best." Indeed, Jones and Blagojevich sometimes collaborated, while at other times they disagreed on funding for education.

During a 2008 congressional race in which Democratic state senator Debbie Halvorson ran against Republican Marty Ozinga, the Democratic Congressional Campaign Committee ran television advertisements attempting to help Halvorson by linking Republican Ozinga to Blagojevich, asserting that Ozinga had given campaign donations to the governor.

=== The Daily Show appearances ===
In February 2006, Blagojevich appeared on The Daily Show to discuss the governor's executive order that pharmacists must dispense any drugs for which a customer had a valid prescription, including birth control pills and Plan B. This measure was being challenged on the show by state legislator Ron Stephens from Greenville, Illinois. Blagojevich was interviewed by Jason Jones, who repeatedly pretended to be unable to pronounce Blagojevich's name and simply called him "Governor Smith". At one point in the interview, Jones, who was acting as if he were against the governor's order, told him, "I'll be in charge of what my listeners hear." This prompted Blagojevich to turn to the camera and ask, "Is he teasing me or is that legit?" Two weeks after the interview, Blagojevich said that he was unaware of the nature of the show. Stephens said he knew beforehand that the show was a comedy show: "I thought the governor was hip enough that he would have known that, too."

Stephens later said, "With all due respect to the governor, he knew it was a comedy show. It's general knowledge for people under 90 years of age. It was when he came off looking so silly that he said he thought it was a regular news program. Even assuming he didn't know about it beforehand, we had to sign a release before the interview."

Blagojevich made another appearance on The Daily Show on August 23, 2010, after his first criminal trial, which ended in a mistrial. During his time on the show, he vehemently defended himself against host Jon Stewart's critique of things that he had previously said on the show. Stewart criticized Blagojevich for expressing a great desire to tell his side in court, but then not doing so. Stewart attempted to get a promise that Blagojevich would testify at his retrial. Stewart also focused on Blagojevich's previous statement to him, that if one heard the famous "effing golden" statement in context, it would be seen as innocent. Stewart then played the additional recording, and asked him how that sounded any different; Blagojevich was unable to answer.

== Political positions ==
=== State spending ===
Blagojevich was criticized for using what his opponents called "gimmicks" to balance the state budget. His administration inherited a large budget shortfall and continued to avoid increases in the general income and sales tax rates, relying instead on a combination of spending reductions, fee and tax changes, borrowing and changes to scheduled pension contributions. In 2003, Blagojevich championed legislation authorizing $10 billion in pension-obligation bonds. Approximately $7.3 billion of the proceeds ultimately went toward reducing existing unfunded pension liabilities, while part of the remainder was used to cover contributions the state otherwise would have paid from current revenues. In 2005, Public Act 94-0004 reduced the state's required pension contributions for fiscal years 2006 and 2007 by a combined $2.3 billion from the amounts that would otherwise have been required under the statutory funding schedule. During 2008, Blagojevich proposed another large pension-bond issue, ranging from $12 billion to $20 billion; a $16 billion version passed the Senate but failed in the House. Blagojevich once told a gathering of black ministers on Chicago's South Side that he was "on the side of our Lord" with his budget proposals.

Blagojevich's proposed fiscal year 2009 operating budget totaled $49.7 billion, about 1.3 percent above the amount originally proposed for fiscal year 2008. Budget reductions in 2008 led the administration to announce the closure of 11 state parks and 13 state historic sites and layoffs at the agencies that operated them. Blagojevich also acknowledged that he had never visited any of the affected parks or historic sites. To plug state budget holes, Blagojevich at one point proposed selling the James R. Thompson Center or mortgaging it. Blagojevich was also criticized for his handling of the 2007 state budget. In particular, critics cited his unprecedented use of line-item and reduction vetoes to remove his political opponents' "member initiatives" from the budget bill. A later NPR Illinois retrospective described the fiscal deterioration during his six years in office as a problem he did not create but also did not prevent.

During 2003, more than 1,000 Illinois judges brought a class action against Blagojevich and the state comptroller after Blagojevich used his reduction-veto authority to block cost-of-living adjustments that had been enacted for the judiciary. In 2004, the Illinois Supreme Court held that the attempt to withhold the increases violated the state constitution's protection against diminishing judicial compensation and ordered the payments made.

=== Health care ===
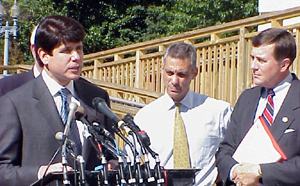
Blagojevich with then Congressman Rahm Emanuel (D-Chicago) advocating for changes in Medicare legislation

During a suspected shortage of the flu vaccine in 2004, Blagojevich ordered 260,000 doses from overseas distributors, which the Food and Drug Administration had warned would be barred from entering the United States. Although the vaccine doses had cost the state $2.6 million, the FDA refused to allow them into the country, and a buyer could not be found; they were donated to earthquake survivors in Pakistan a year later. However, the lots had expired, and Pakistan destroyed the vaccines.

Also in 2004, Blagojevich announced the I-SaveRx program, a state-backed website intended to help Illinois residents buy lower-cost prescription medication from approved pharmacies in Canada and the United Kingdom despite objections from the U.S. Food and Drug Administration. The administration estimated that participants could save 25 to 50 percent compared with U.S. retail prices.

Blagojevich issued an executive order in 2005 requiring pharmacies that sold prescription contraceptives to fill valid prescriptions for emergency contraception, including Plan B, notwithstanding objections by individual pharmacists. The rule was challenged in state court. A 2007 settlement in one case permitted objecting pharmacists to step aside if another pharmacist would fill the prescription or the customer was promptly directed elsewhere. In another case, Morr-Fitz v. Blagojevich (later Morr-Fitz v. Quinn), the Illinois Appellate Court ultimately held that the rule violated state law protecting conscience rights.

During October 2005, Blagojevich announced All Kids, his plan to provide access to state-subsidized health insurance for every child in Illinois. Signed into law in November 2005 and implemented in July 2006, All Kids made Illinois the first state to establish a program making comprehensive health coverage available to every uninsured child regardless of family income or immigration status, with premiums and copayments varying by income. The program built on earlier KidCare and FamilyCare expansions and was initially projected to make coverage available to roughly a quarter-million uninsured children.

During March 2007, Blagojevich announced and campaigned for a much broader health-care proposal known as Illinois Covered. He proposed financing the health expansion, additional education spending, pension relief and a capital program largely through a new gross receipts tax on businesses. The proposal would have raised several billion dollars annually and was described by business opponents as the largest tax increase in state history. Illinois House Speaker Mike Madigan called for a non-binding vote to test support for the gross receipts tax. When it became apparent that the resolution would be defeated, Blagojevich urged lawmakers to vote against it; the House rejected the idea 107–0. The health-care legislation itself also failed to win sufficient support in the Senate.

Blagojevich's Illinois Covered proposal also included an employer assessment, structured as a payroll tax on businesses with at least ten employees that provided little or no health coverage for their workers.

Lawmakers did not approve another expansion of FamilyCare that would have extended subsidized coverage to higher-income parents, but Blagojevich's administration attempted to implement the expansion without specific legislative authorization. A legislative rulemaking committee rejected the expansion, and courts later held that the administration lacked authority to proceed with it. During October 2008, pharmacies that had dispensed drugs under the disputed expansion were informed by the administration that some payments would be recouped through future Medicaid reimbursements. One state lawmaker, Republican Ron Stephens, suggested that Blagojevich should pay the difference out of his own personal account.

The Associated Press attempted under the Freedom of Information Act to determine how the state planned to pay for the Blagojevich-ordered expansion, how many people were enrolled, and how much the care had cost, but state departments declined to provide the requested information.

=== Business ===
After Blagojevich pushed for a law banning sales of certain violent or sexually explicit video games to minors, a federal court held that the law violated the First Amendment, and the state was ordered to pay more than $500,000 in the video-game industry's legal fees.

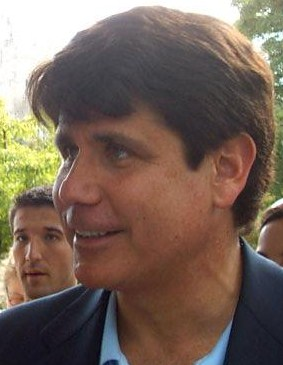
Blagojevich greeting students at Illinois State University in 2006

Blagojevich vetoed three bills that would permit trucks to drive 65 mph outside the Chicago area instead of the then-current 55 mph, stating that one bill "compromises safety". His administration also supported labor-oriented measures including increases in the state minimum wage; legislation signed in December 2006 raised the rate to $7.50 an hour in July 2007 and scheduled annual increases to $8.25 by 2010.

Blagojevich threatened to stop the state's dealings with Bank of America Corp. over a shut-down factory in Chicago. On December 8, 2008, all state agencies were ordered to stop conducting business with Bank of America to pressure the company to restore credit to Republic Windows and Doors, whose workers were staging a sit-in after being laid off without expected severance and vacation pay. John Douglas, a former general counsel for the FDIC and attorney for Bank of America, called Blagojevich's action dangerous.

=== Gun control ===
Blagojevich was a supporter of gun-control legislation during both his congressional and gubernatorial careers.

During his February 2006 State of the State address, Blagojevich called for Illinois to ban assault weapons and .50-caliber rifles and to strengthen restrictions on gun trafficking.

As a state legislator, Blagojevich proposed raising the price of an Illinois Firearm Owners Identification (FOID) card from $5 to $500. Blagojevich vetoed three gun bills in 2005, which would have:

1. Deleted records in the state gun-purchase database after 90 days
2. Eliminated the waiting period for someone wanting to buy a rifle or shotgun when trading in a previously owned weapon
3. Overridden local laws regulating transport of firearms.

=== Oprah Winfrey ===
In early 2009, Blagojevich reported being so impressed by Oprah Winfrey's influence on the election of Barack Obama that he considered offering Obama's vacant Senate seat to Winfrey. Blagojevich summarized his reasons for considering Winfrey on various talk shows:

To begin with, she was perhaps the most instrumental person in electing Barack Obama president. She is a larger-than-life figure in America and around the world. She has a huge bully pulpit and tremendous support across America ... She has a voice larger than all 100 senators combined. And if she was a U.S. Senator, she would be a voice for the Obama program, which she supports, and she would be in a position to be able to use an unbelievable bully pulpit to be able to get it done. She obviously can't be bought. And she's actually a very, obviously, in my judgment, a very impressive and a very nice person.... On the other hand, how likely is it she'd give up what she's doing for that? I mean, being a senator's a big deal, but it ain't Oprah.

Winfrey noted that although she was uninterested, she did feel she could be a senator.

Political analyst Chris Matthews praised Blagojevich's idea of making Winfrey a senator, suggesting that in one move it would diversify the Senate and raise its collective IQ. Elaborating further he said:

Anybody who doesn't think Winfrey would be a great senator from Illinois or anywhere is crazy. She gets along with everybody. She brings people together. She finds common ground. She's way past race politics 20 years ago. She's so far ahead of most people in human relations. And she listens ... I think she is up there with Will Rogers and Bob Hope and some of our great public personalities of the last century.

Lynn Sweet of the Chicago Sun Times agreed with Matthews, writing Winfrey would be "terrific" and an "enormously popular pick".

== Impeachment, removal from office, trial ==
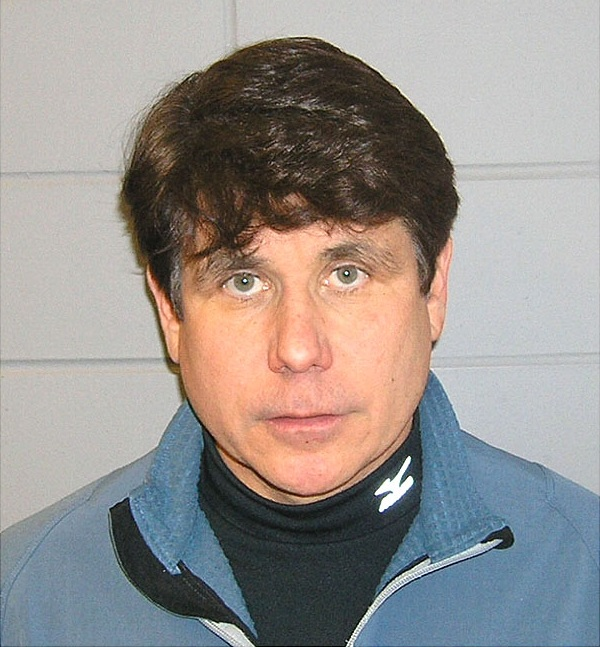
U.S. Marshals' photo of Blagojevich on the day of his arrest

"Governor Arrested for Bribery" – video news report about Blagojevich from Voice of America, December 10, 2008

U.S. Attorney Patrick Fitzgerald directed the FBI to arrest Blagojevich at his home on December 9, 2008, and charge him with corruption. The Justice Department complaint alleged that the governor conspired to commit several "pay-to-play" schemes, including attempting "to obtain personal gain ... through the corrupt use" of his authority to fill the United States Senate seat vacated by Barack Obama following his election as president, claiming that in wiretapped recordings Blagojevich discussed his desire to get something in exchange for an appointment to the seat. After various outreach efforts, he appointed former state attorney general Roland Burris on New Year's Eve 2008. Burris was seated after some initial opposition in mid-January 2009. A trial was set for June 3, 2010, and U.S. Attorney Patrick Fitzgerald spoke out on the charges, characterizing Blagojevich's actions as trying to auction the open seat off to "the highest bidder".

The Illinois House and Senate moved quickly to impeach the governor for abuse of power and corruption. On January 8, the Illinois House voted 114–1 (with three abstentions) to impeach Blagojevich. The charges brought by the House emphasized Blagojevich's alleged abuses of power and his alleged attempts to sell legislative authorizations and/or vetoes, and gubernatorial appointments including that of Obama's vacated Senate seat. Blagojevich was taped by the FBI saying "I've got this thing, and it's fucking golden. I'm just not giving it up for fucking nothing."

On January 27, 2009, Blagojevich began a media campaign planned by publicist Glenn Selig. During the two-day campaign, he visited Today, Good Morning America, The Early Show, The View, multiple programs on Fox News Channel, CNN and MSNBC where he proclaimed his innocence and insisted he would be vindicated.

On January 29, 2009, Blagojevich was removed from office and prohibited from ever holding public office in the state of Illinois again, by two separate and unanimous votes of 59–0 by the Illinois Senate. His lieutenant governor Pat Quinn subsequently became governor of Illinois.

Blagojevich's impeachment trial and removal from office did not affect his federal indictment in the United States District Court for the Northern District of Illinois, since impeachment is a political as opposed to a criminal sanction in addition to being (in this particular case) a punishment imposed at the state level.

=== Post-removal activities ===
After being convicted and removed from office by the Illinois Senate, Blagojevich went on Late Show with David Letterman and The Daily Show with Jon Stewart, where he re-affirmed his innocence and stated that the Illinois legislature's decision to remove him from office was politically motivated, being due to his unwillingness to raise taxes. He has accused his successor, Pat Quinn, of using state funds excessively for personal leisure. Contemporary reporting on Quinn's travel records found that he frequently paid his own lodging and had not accepted the state's $32 daily meal allowance.

Blagojevich attempted to make a deal to star in NBC's 2009 summer reality show I'm a Celebrity ... Get Me out of Here! He made a request with the judge to ease his travel restrictions so that he could travel to Costa Rica to star in the show, saying that his family needed to make money. However, his request was formally rejected by U.S. District Judge James B. Zagel, who was sympathetic to Blagojevich's financial situation, but nevertheless stated, "I don't think this defendant fully understands and I don't think he could understand ... the position he finds himself in." Judge Zagel went on further to note that Blagojevich must prepare for his defense.

Despite the ruling, NBC expressed an interest in negotiating with the judge to have Blagojevich as a part of the show. His wife took his place on the show, which began airing June 1, 2009. He told an interviewer he found it difficult to watch his wife eat a dead tarantula on the broadcast, but remarked that her willingness to participate in the show was "an act of love" because she was earning funds to alleviate their adverse financial position.

On June 13, 2009, Blagojevich starred in the improv group The Second City's musical Rod Blagojevich Superstar. He performed in order to support the charity Gilda's Club Chicago, which offers support for people living with cancer.

On June 30, 2009, Blagojevich's autobiography The Governor: The Truth Behind the Political Scandal That Continues to Rock the Nation was announced for print release on September 8, 2009. The book was also released by Amazon.com for sale as an eBook on the Kindle on the same day as the announcement.

On July 19, 2009, Blagojevich began hosting a two-hour weekly radio talk show on 890 WLS, which aired mid-day Sundays. He had previously been a guest host of the "Don Wade and Roma Morning Show" on WLS in March 2009. On June 2, 2010, WLS placed Blagojevich's radio show on hiatus while his corruption trial was ongoing.

Blagojevich appeared on season 3 of The Celebrity Apprentice in Spring 2010, asserting that he has the "skill and know-how to get things accomplished" on the series. Series star and producer Donald Trump praised Blagojevich's "tremendous courage and guts", and predicted that he would become one of the show's breakout stars. Trump subsequently fired Blagojevich in the fourth episode of the season, which aired April 4, 2010.

In an interview with Esquire in January 2010, Blagojevich said about President Obama, "Everything he's saying's on the teleprompter. I'm blacker than Barack Obama. I shined shoes. I grew up in a five-room apartment. My father had a little laundromat in a black community not far from where he lived. I saw it all growing up." He soon backpedaled from the term "blacker than", saying that he had chosen his words poorly, but he stood by his message that "the frustration is real, and the frustration is still, today, average, ordinary people aren't getting a fair shake."

Blagojevich made an appearance at the Wizard World Chicago comic convention in August 2010, conversing with and taking pictures with attendees. He charged $50 for an autograph and $80 for a photo. He also had a humorous televised meeting with Adam West; Blagojevich remarked that he considered The Joker to be the best Batman foil. Comic fandom website Bleeding Cool reported that Blagojevich had met with a mostly positive reception, while Time Out Chicago described it as mixed.

=== Federal trial and conviction ===
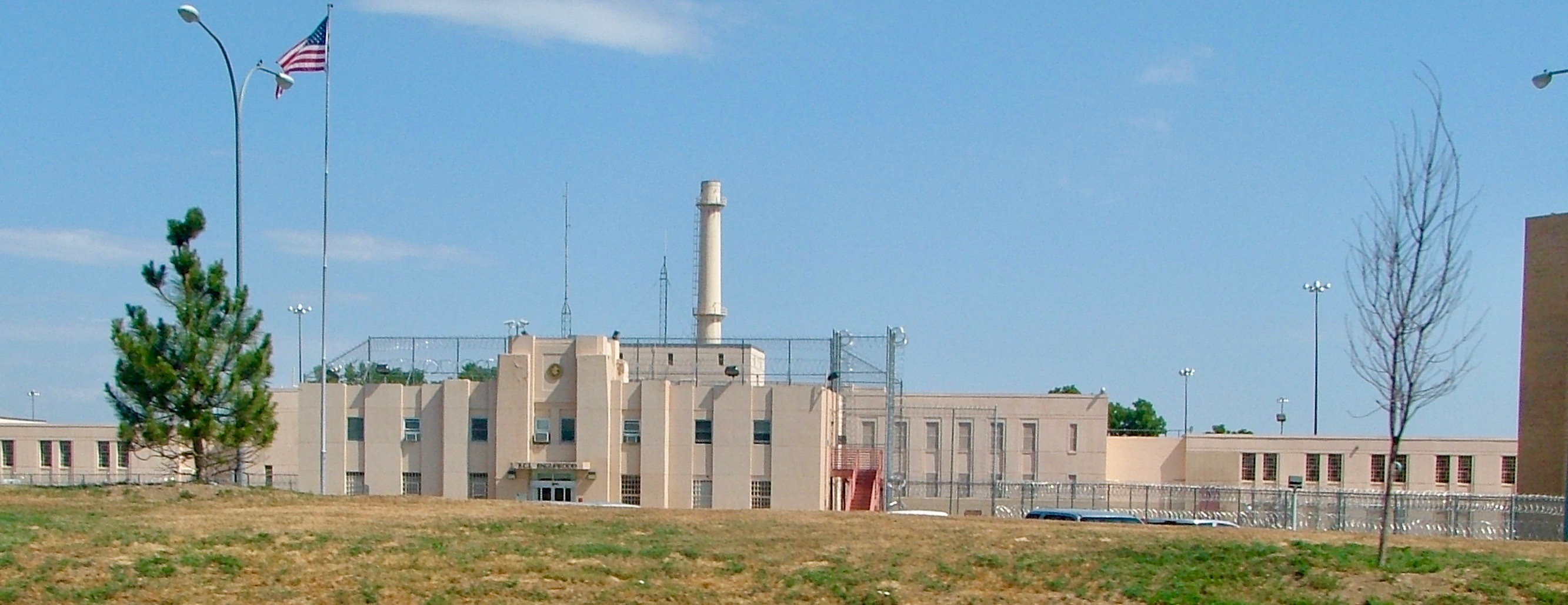
FCI Englewood, where Blagojevich was located

Blagojevich was indicted by a federal grand jury in April 2009. Most of the charges were related to attempts to sell the Senate seat vacated by then-President-elect Barack Obama. On August 17, 2010, he was convicted on one of the 24 federal charges, a charge of lying to the FBI, and the jury was hung on 23 other counts. The defense did not call a single witness, claiming that prosecutors did not prove their case. Because the jury could not agree on the remaining charges, a mistrial was ordered for those counts. Within 15 minutes after the mistrial was declared, the prosecution team announced that they would definitely pursue a retrial on the 23 mistrial counts. A post-verdict court date was set for August 23, 2010. Federal prosecutors reduced the number of counts for Blagojevich's retrial, and, on June 27, 2011, he was found guilty of 17 of the 20 remaining charges and not guilty on one, and no verdict was rendered by the jury on two counts. He was found guilty on all charges pertaining to the Senate seat, as well as extortion relating to state funds being directed towards a children's hospital and race track. However, he was acquitted on a charge pertaining to the tollway extortion and avoided a guilty verdict (by split decision) on attempting to extort Rahm Emanuel.

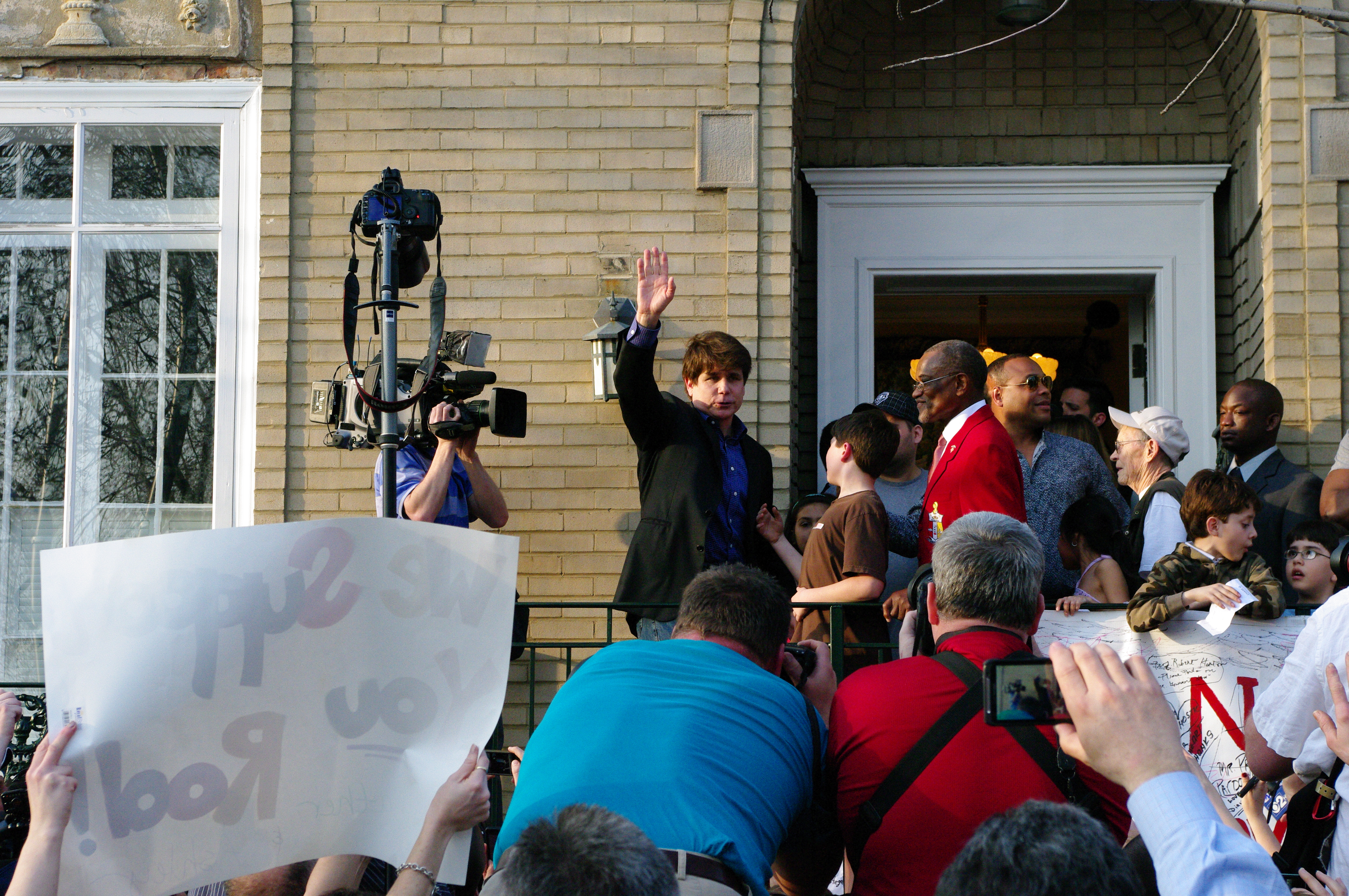
Blagojevich waves as he leaves his house to begin serving his sentence.

He reported to prison on March 15, 2012, at Federal Correctional Institution, Englewood, Colorado. His Federal Bureau of Prisons (BOP) number was 40892–424. Had his sentence not been commuted by President Donald Trump, under federal rules, Blagojevich would have served at least 85%, or 12 years, of his sentence after which time he may have been eligible for early release in March 2024, based on good behavior. However, President Trump commuted his sentence so he was released on February 18, 2020.

While in the federal penitentiary, Blagojevich was the lead singer for a prison band called "The Jailhouse Rockers", named after an Elvis Presley song. The band dissolved when the lead guitarist was released. He was the fourth Illinois governor to serve time in federal prison, after Otto Kerner Jr., Dan Walker (post-governorship criminal activity), and George Ryan (crimes starting during his prior service as Secretary of State).

=== Appeal ===
Blagojevich appealed his conviction, claiming judicial bias and a tainted jury pool. He has also long contended that there was critical evidence the jury never heard, including witness testimony and recorded phone calls that Judge Zagel did not allow to be played during the trial. They have also argued that Blagojevich's own testimony was restricted by Judge Zagel's rulings.

In July 2013, Blagojevich filed an appeal with the United States Court of Appeals for the Seventh Circuit in Chicago challenging the corruption conviction and the length of his prison term. A three-judge panel of the Seventh Circuit heard arguments in the case in December 2013. In July 2015, the court unanimously vacated five of the corruption convictions, including his convictions for attempting to sell Barack Obama's vacant U.S. Senate seat after he was elected president, but affirmed the rest. The court's decision remanded to the district court. The Seventh Circuit denied Blagojevich's request for rehearing en banc, and in March 2016, the Supreme Court of the United States denied Blagojevich's petition for a writ of certiorari.

In August 2016, a resentencing hearing was held in the district court. Judge Zagel re-imposed the same 14-year sentence he had imposed in 2011. Zagel acknowledged the suffering of Blagojevich's family and Blagojevich's good conduct in prison, but found that Blagojevich's corrupt conduct still warranted a 14-year sentence. Blagojevich's attorneys appealed to the 7th Circuit, but failed; then filed another appeal with the U.S. Supreme Court on November 3, 2017. Meanwhile, Blagojevich continued to fight his conviction and sentence in the media. His wife Patti joined him in attracting press attention to his cause and criticism of the federal judiciary. On April 16, 2018, the U.S. Supreme Court refused to hear an appeal, the second time in two years.

=== Commutation ===
President Donald Trump told reporters on May 31, 2018, hours after he had pardoned commentator Dinesh D'Souza, that he was considering commuting Blagojevich's sentence without pardoning him, as well as pardoning Martha Stewart. Trump called Blagojevich's sentence "unfair", saying that Blagojevich's statements about enriching himself were "stupid", but also the sort of thing "that many other politicians say". Blagojevich filed a petition officially asking President Trump for commutation of sentence on June 5, 2018. In August 2019, Trump commented to reporters that he was "very strongly" considering issuing a commutation.

President Donald Trump speaks about commuting Blagojevich on February 18, 2020. Video from White House.

On February 18, 2020, President Trump commuted Blagojevich's 14-year corruption sentence, wiping away the sentence but not the conviction. "I don't know him very well, I've met him a couple of times, he was on for a short time on The Apprentice years ago, seemed like a very nice person, don't know him, but he served eight years in jail, there's a long time to go," Trump said to reporters. Some news sources noted that, in addition to The Apprentice connection, Trump and his organization had made contributions to Blagojevich's political campaigns, including his 2002 gubernatorial campaign.

Blagojevich was released from prison that day, and flew home to Chicago that night. Speaking to reporters after his release, he stated, "I'm profoundly grateful to President Trump, and I will be for as long as I live." He said Trump was "a man who's not only tough and outspoken, strong, but he has a kind heart", and proclaimed himself to be a "Trump-ocrat". On February 19, Blagojevich held a press conference at his home in Chicago's Ravenswood neighborhood, where he remained defiant towards his conviction, describing himself as a "political prisoner", and promised to use his experience in prison to fix the broken criminal justice system.

Illinois House GOP leader Jim Durkin criticized the President's decision to commute Blagojevich's sentence, stating that Blagojevich was "rogue on steroids" when he "abused the office" and that Trump was "not concerned about the people of Illinois in November." The commutation was satirized by Chicago-based The Wieners Circle. Following the commutation, the Illinois Attorney Registration and Disciplinary Commission found that Blagojevich had engaged in "a pattern of dishonest and deceptive conduct" and recommended his disbarment to the Illinois Supreme Court. On May 18, 2020, the Supreme Court of Illinois officially disbarred him.

In August of the same year, it was announced that Blagojevich would be the featured speaker at a fundraising event to benefit Republican state senate candidate Tom McCullagh. The candidate's campaign stated that "McCullagh is welcoming [Blagojevich] to the table to give us an inside look to help understand the depths of the Madigan machine and how to end corruption in Illinois.".

=== Pardon ===
On February 10, 2025, President Donald Trump issued a full and unconditional pardon to Blagojevich using the power given to presidents in the Constitution. While Blagojevich had already been walking free since Trump's 2020 commutation of his sentence, the pardon cleared Blagojevich's criminal record. The pardon did not reverse the Illinois Senate's prohibition on Blagojevich holding state office or restore his Illinois law license.

== Post-political career ==
In May 2020, Blagojevich launched a politics-themed podcast titled The Lightning Rod on WLS-AM 890. The podcast ran through September 2021.

In May 2025, it was reported that Blagojevich was considering a bid to succeed Dick Durbin in the 2026 United States Senate election in Illinois and that he was undecided on which party he would seek it under if he did run. He later endorsed the candidacy of Congresswoman Robin Kelly for the Democratic primary.

In June 2025, Blagojevich commented on the sentencing of Mike Madigan, claiming that the system in Springfield is corrupt.

In December 2025, Blagojevich pushed for former Commonwealth Edison CEO Anne Pramaggiore to be granted clemency shortly before she was scheduled to report to prison for a bribery conviction. Though not confirmed to be tied to Blagojevich's clemency plea, on January 12, 2026, Pramaggiore reported to a prison in Marianna, Florida which was acknowledged to be of minimum security. While also not known if it was tied to Blagojevich's clemency plea, on April 14, 2026, the U.S. 7th Circuit Court of Appeals ordered Pramaggiore to be released from prison on bail and get a re-trial, with Pramaggiore then officially being released from prison the following day. However, Praggiore's co-defendant Michael McClain was released and ordered to get a retrial as well.

== Personal life ==
Blagojevich married Patricia Mell, the daughter of former Chicago alderman Richard Mell. He is a Serbian Orthodox Christian. Blagojevich voted for Ronald Reagan in 1980 and voted for his re-election in 1984.

Blagojevich had an amateur boxing career which spanned 13 months and included Golden Gloves competition. He trained under Jerry Marzillo in Chicago's Park District, and he fought some of his matches at the St. Andrews Gym on Chicago's North Side.

=== Personal style ===
Blagojevich was famed for his flamboyant dress style, such as his taste for Charvet ties. After the Justice Department complaint was made public, Blagojevich's hairstyle became the subject of discussion and jokes for national and local media personalities. Blagojevich insisted his aides always carry a hairbrush for him. He referred to it as "the football", alluding to the term nuclear football, which represents the bomb launch codes never to be out of reach of the president.

== Electoral history ==
=== House of Representatives ===
1996

- Rod Blagojevich, Democratic: 64%
- Michael Flanagan (incumbent), Republican: 36%

1998

- Rod Blagojevich (incumbent), Democratic: 74%
- Alan Spitz, Republican: 26%

2000

- Rod Blagojevich (incumbent), Democratic: 87%
- Matt Beauchamp, Libertarian: 13%

=== Gubernatorial elections ===
2002 Illinois gubernatorial election

- Rod Blagojevich, Democratic: 1,847,040, 52.2%
- Jim Ryan, Republican: 1,594,960, 45.1%
- Cal Skinner, Libertarian: 73,794, 2.1%
- Marisellis Brown, Independent: 23,089, 0.7%

2006 Illinois gubernatorial election

- Rod Blagojevich (incumbent), Democratic: 1,736,731, 49.8%
- Judy Baar Topinka, Republican: 1,369,315, 39.3%
- Rich Whitney, Green: 361,336, 10.4%
- Randall C. Stufflebeam, write-in: 19,020, 0.5%
- Other write-ins: 1,587, 0.0%

== See also ==
- List of people granted executive clemency in the first Trump presidency
- List of people granted executive clemency in the second Trump presidency

U.S. House of Representatives
Preceded by Michael Flanagan	Member of the U.S. House of Representatives from Illinois's 5th congressional district 1997–2003	Succeeded by Rahm Emanuel
Party political offices
Preceded by Glenn Poshard	Democratic nominee for Governor of Illinois; 2002, 2006	Succeeded by Pat Quinn
Political offices
Preceded by George H. Ryan	Governor of Illinois; 2003–2009	Succeeded by Pat Quinn
U.S. order of precedence (ceremonial)
Preceded by Martha McSally as Former U.S. Senator	Order of precedence of the United States; Within Illinois	Succeeded by Pat Quinn as Former Governor
Preceded by Phil Bryant as Former Governor	Order of precedence of the United States; Outside Illinois	Succeeded by Pat Quinn as Former Governor
