= Illinois Bail Amendment =

Illinois Bail Amendment may refer to:

- Illinois Bail Amendment (1982)
- Illinois Bail Amendment (1986)
