= Jill Zwick =

American politician (born 1944)

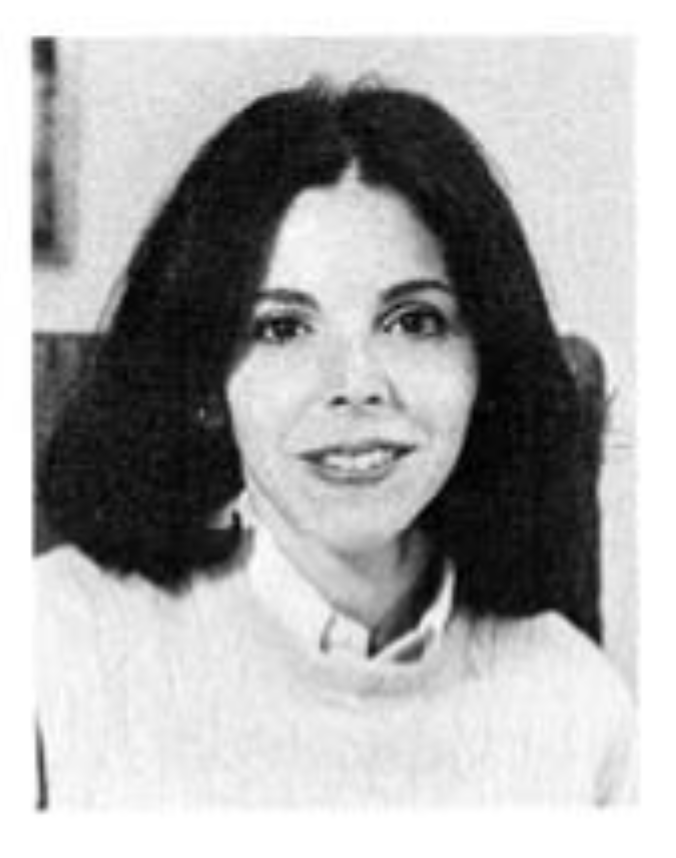
- Jill Zwick's Official Photo in the Illinois Blue Book, 1985-1986.

Illinois House of Representatives
- In office 1981–1987

Personal details
- Born: June 12, 1944 (age 82) Chicago, Illinois
- Party: Republican
- Spouse: Morton Zwick (m. 1968; div. 1984)
- Education: Bradley University, Roosevelt University

Jill Zwick (born June 12, 1944) is an American politician.

Born in Chicago, Illinois, Zwick went to Bradley University and Roosevelt University majoring in business. Zwick is a Republican and served on the Kane County Board. From 1981 to 1987, Zwick served in the Illinois House of Representatives. She was primaried by her ex-husband Morton "Mort" Zwick and she withdrew from the race.

Zwick served as state director for six years from 1992-1998 under Senator Carol Moseley-Braun. She then became director of the Department of Intergovernmental Affairs in the Illinois Secretary of State’s Office under Secretary of State Jesse White.

After 22 years in the Department of Intergovernmental Affairs, Zwick retired in 2021.

== Notes ==
Illinois House of Representatives
Preceded by Calvin Skinner; R. Bruce Waddell	Member of the Illinois House of Representatives from the 33rd district 1981–1983; Served alongside: Richard O. Klemm, Thomas J. Hanahan	Succeeded by Nelson G. R. Rice, Sr.
Preceded by District established	Member of the Illinois House of Representatives from the 65th district 1983–1987	Succeeded by DeLoris Doederlein
