= Robert Waddell =

Robert Waddell may refer to:

- Rob Waddell (born 1975), New Zealand rower, and yachtsman
- R. Bruce Waddell (1914–1979), American politician
- Bobby Waddell (1939–2021), Scottish footballer
