= Calvin Skinner =

American politician

Cal Skinner

Member of the Illinois House of Representatives from the 64th district
- In office 1993 – 2001
- Preceded by: Ron Wait
- Succeeded by: Rosemary Kurtz

Member of the Illinois House of Representatives from the 33rd district
- In office 1973 – 1981
- Preceded by: Lester Cunningham
- Succeeded by: Jill Zwick

Personal details
- Born: June 11, 1942 (age 84) Easton, Maryland
- Party: Republican; Libertarian (2002)
- Education: Oberlin College (B.S.); University of Michigan (M.P.A.)

Calvin L. Skinner, Jr. is an American politician who served two tenures as a Republican member of the Illinois House of Representatives from 1973 to 1981 and again from 1993 to 2001.

== Early life ==
Skinner was born in Easton, Maryland on June 11, 1942. During his childhood, he moved to Illinois and attended Crystal Lake High School. He then attended Oberlin College and the University of Michigan where he earned a bachelor's degree in economics and a master of public administration. He accepted a job with the United States Bureau of the Budget. In 1966, at age 23, he returned to McHenry County and was elected county treasurer. During his time as Treasurer he became a Certified Illinois Assessing Officer.

== Political career ==
Skinner was first elected to the Illinois House of Representatives as one of three members from the 33rd district with Republican R. Bruce Waddell and Democrat Thomas J. Hanahan. Skinner was an opponent of the Regional Transportation Authority citing the limited services provided to exurban residents and the risk to local autonomy. He did sit on the R.T.A. Legislative Advisory Committee. He left the legislature in 1981 and was succeeded by Republican Jill Zwick.

He later served another tenure in the Illinois House from the 64th district from 1993 to 2001. He was the Libertarian nominee for Governor of Illinois in 2002 with running mate Jim Tobin. They received 73,794 votes.

Party political offices
Preceded by John W. Castle	Republican nominee for Illinois Comptroller; 1982	Succeeded by Adeline Geo-Karis
