= Zwickl =

Zwickl is a surname. Notable people with the surname include:

- Dániel Zwickl (born 1984), Hungarian table tennis player
- Helmut Zwickl (born 1939), Austrian journalist
- Kurt Zwickl (1949–2021), American politician

== See also ==
- Zwick
