= 2002 Illinois gubernatorial election =

- November 5, 2002
- Turnout: 50.05% ▲0.33 pp
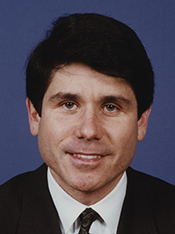

Nominee	Rod Blagojevich	Jim Ryan
Party	Democratic	Republican
Running mate	Pat Quinn	Carl Hawkinson
Popular vote	1,847,040	1,594,961
Percentage	52.19%	45.07%
- County results Blagojevich: 40–50% 50–60% 60–70% Ryan: 40–50% 50–60% 60–70% 70–80%
Governor before election
George Ryan
Republican
Elected Governor
Rod Blagojevich
Democratic

The 2002 Illinois gubernatorial election occurred on November 5, 2002. Incumbent Republican Governor George Ryan, who was plagued by scandal, did not run for a second term. Democrat Rod Blagojevich, a U.S. congressman, ran against Republican Jim Ryan (no relation to the incumbent), the Illinois attorney general.

Blagojevich won 52% to 45%, snapping a losing streak of seven elections, and becoming the first Democrat to win an election for governor in 30 years, since 1972. As of 2026, this is the most recent Illinois governor election in which no candidate running was an incumbent.

== Background ==
The primaries and general elections coincided with those for federal elections (Senate and House), as well as those for other state offices. The election was part of the 2002 Illinois elections.

For the primaries, turnout for the gubernatorial primaries was 30.81%, with 2,170,344 votes cast and turnout for the lieutenant gubernatorial primaries was 26.99% with 1,908,564 votes cast. For the general election, turnout was 50.05%, with 3,538,891 votes cast.

== Democratic primary ==
=== Governor ===
==== Candidates ====
- Rod Blagojevich, U.S. representative
- Roland Burris, former attorney general of Illinois, former Illinois state comptroller, candidate for governor in 1994 and 1998 and independent candidate for mayor of Chicago in 1995
- Paul Vallas, former CEO of Chicago Public Schools

==== Debate ====
2002 Illinois gubernatorial election Democratic primary debate
No.	Date	Host	Moderator	Link	Democratic	Democratic	Democratic
Key: P Participant A Absent N Not invited I Invited W Withdrawn							
Key: P Participant A Absent N Not invited I Invited W Withdrawn					Rod Blagojevich	Roland Burris	Paul Vallas
1	Jan. 10, 2002	City Club of Chicago	Paul Green	YouTube	P	P	P

==== Results ====
The Democratic primary was a very close three-way race. Blagojevich prevailed by just 25,469 votes, and just by 2.03%. Vallas did very well in the Chicago suburbs, and narrowly defeated Burris in Cook County, the most populous county in the state. Vallas led early on in the night with Burris in second and Blagojevich in third. Vallas had won probably the most vital county, Cook County. For Blagojevich to beat both opponents, he had to run the board through the rest of Illinois. Blagojevich won almost all of the state's rural counties. Eventually, Cook County had reported all of its votes, with a slight advantage for Vallas over Burris. However many votes were still left to be counted in other cities outside the Chicago area. Blagojevich managed to pull out a narrow victory by winning in Champaign County, home of Champaign. Blagojevich also did well in Sangamon County home to the state's capital, Springfield. Blagojevich also won St. Clair County home of East St. Louis. In the early morning the day after the election, Vallas realized that with all of Cook County's votes counted, he had lost. At 4:18am, Vallas called Blagojevich and congratulated him, and pledged Blagojevich his full support for the general election.

County results Blagojevich: 30–40%; 40–50%; 50–60%; 60–70%; 70–80%; Vallas: 30–40%; 40–50%; 50–60%; Burris: 40–50%

Democratic gubernatorial primary results
Party	Candidate	Votes	%
Democratic	Rod Blagojevich	457,197	36.50
Democratic	Paul Vallas	431,728	34.47
Democratic	Roland Burris	363,591	29.03
Total votes		1,252,516	100.00

=== Lieutenant governor ===
==== Candidates ====
- F. Michael Kelleher Jr.
- Pat Quinn, former treasurer of Illinois, nominee for secretary of state in 1994 candidate for US Senate in 1996 candidate for lieutenant governor in 1998
- Joyce Washington, nurse

==== Results ====
County results Quinn: 40–50%; 50–60%; 60–70%; Washington: 40–50%; Kelleher: 40–50%; 50–60%; 60–70%; 70–80%

Democratic lieutenant gubernatorial primary results
Party	Candidate	Votes	%
Democratic	Pat Quinn	471,038	42.11
Democratic	Joyce W. Washington	362,902	32.35
Democratic	F. Michael Kelleher, Jr.	284,549	25.44
Total votes		1,118,489	100.00

== Republican primary ==
=== Governor ===
==== Candidates ====
- Patrick O'Malley, state senator
- Jim Ryan, attorney general of Illinois
- Corinne Wood, lieutenant governor

==== Results ====
County results Ryan: 30–40%; 40–50%; 50–60%; 60–70%; O'Malley: 30–40%; 40–50%; 50–60%; 60–70%; Wood: 30–40%; 40–50%; Tie (40–50%)

Republican primary results
Party	Candidate	Votes	%
Republican	Jim Ryan	410,074	44.68
Republican	Patrick O'Malley	260,860	28.42
Republican	Corinne Wood	246,825	26.89
Republican	Write-ins	69	0.01
Total votes		917,828	100.00

=== Lieutenant governor ===
==== Candidates ====
- Carl Hawkinson, state senator and former Knox County state's attorney
- Jack McInerney
- William O'Connor
- Charles Owens

==== Results ====
Hawkinson: 30–40%; 40–50%; 50–60%; 60–70%; 70–80%; 80–90%; >90%; O'Connor: 30–40%; 40–50%; 50–60%; Owens: 40–50%

Republican lieutenant gubernatorial primary results
Party	Candidate	Votes	%
Republican	Carl Hawkinson	373,040	47.22
Republican	William A. O'Connor	257,375	32.58
Republican	Jack J. McInerney	90,571	11.46
Republican	Charles G. Owens	69,089	8.74
Total votes		790,075	100.00

== Libertarian nomination ==
In March 2002, the Libertarian Party of Illinois nominated Cal Skinner. Skinner had formerly served as a Republican state representative, and was a political conservative.

== General election ==
=== Campaign ===
In the general election, Blagojevich defeated Republican Illinois Attorney General Jim Ryan by a solid margin. Ethics scandals had plagued the administration of incumbent Republican George Ryan, who was of no relation to Jim Ryan, and Blagojevich's campaign focused on the theme of "ending business as usual" in state government. During the campaign, Blagojevich played on the name of his opponent by asking "How can you replace one Ryan with another Ryan and call that change? You want change? Elect a guy named Blagojevich."

=== Predictions ===
Source	Ranking	As of
The Cook Political Report	Lean D (flip)	October 31, 2002
Sabato's Crystal Ball	Likely D (flip)	November 4, 2002

=== Polling ===
Poll source	Date(s) administered	Sample size (Note: Key: A – all adults RV – registered voters LV – likely voters V – unclear)	Margin of error	Rod Blagojevich (D)	Jim Ryan (R)	Cal Skinner (L)	Other / Undecided
SurveyUSA	October 28–30, 2002	535 (LV)	± 4.3%	53%	39%	4%	4%

=== Results ===
Although the election was thought to be a close one early on in the campaign, Blagojevich's big numbers out of Cook County were too much for the Republicans to come back from.

2002 Illinois gubernatorial election
Party	Candidate	Votes	%	±%
Democratic	Rod Blagojevich	1,847,040	52.19%	+4.73%
Republican	Jim Ryan	1,594,961	45.07%	−5.96%
Libertarian	Cal Skinner	73,794	2.09%	N/A
Independent	Marisellis Brown	23,089	0.65%	N/A
Write-in	Peter Dale Kauss	8	0.00%	N/A
Total votes		3,538,891	100.00%	N/A
Democratic gain from Republican				

==== Counties that flipped from Democratic to Republican ====
- Clinton (largest city: Breese)
- Coles (largest city: Charleston)
- Fayette (largest city: Vandalia)
- Greene (largest city: Carrollton)
- Jersey (largest city: Jerseyville)
- Moultrie (largest city: Sullivan)
- Shelby (largest city: Shelbyville)
- White (largest city: Carmi)
- Williamson (largest city: Marion)
- Johnson (largest city: Vienna)
- Cumberland (largest city: Neoga)
- Crawford (largest city: Robinson)
- Wabash (largest city: Mount Carmel)
- Effingham (largest city: Effingham)
- Clark (largest city: Marshall)
- Jasper (largest city: Newton)
- Richland (largest city: Olney)
- Clay (largest city: Flora)
- Wayne (largest city: Fairfield)

==== Counties that flipped from Republican to Democratic ====
- Rock Island (largest city: Moline)
- Whiteside (largest city: Sterling)
- LaSalle (largest city: Ottawa)
- Winnebago (largest city: Rockford)
- Mason (largest city: Havana)
- Putnam (largest city: Hennpin)

== See also ==
- Electoral history of Rod Blagojevich
