= Barbara Giolitto =

American politician

Barbara A. Giolitto (born September 1, 1946) is an American politician who served as a Democratic member of the Illinois House of Representatives.

Born in Elgin, Illinois, Giolitto received her associate degree from Rock Valley College and her bachelor's degree in sociology from Rockford College. She lives in Rockford, Illinois.

In the 1991 decennial redistricting process, Republican incumbent Ron Wait was redistricted into the 68th House District. The 68th included all of Boone County, eastern Winnebago County, and a small portion of northern DeKalb County. Giolitto defeated Wait in the 1992 general election. In a 1994 rematch, the staunchly Republican district reverted to form and Wait was returned to the Illinois House of Representatives.
