= Ronald A. Wait =

American politician (1944–2024)

Ron Wait

Member of the Illinois House of Representatives
- In office 1995 – 2011
- Preceded by: Barbara Giolitto
- Succeeded by: Joe Sosnowski
- Constituency: 69th district (2003–2011); 68th district (1995–2003)
- In office 1983 – 1993
- Preceded by: District created
- Succeeded by: Calvin Skinner (redistricted)
- Constituency: 64th district

Personal details
- Born: April 15, 1944 Belvidere, Illinois, U.S.
- Died: December 2024 (aged 80)
- Party: Republican
- Spouse: Jody
- Children: 1
- Education: Drake University (BS, JD); Northern Illinois University (MSEd, MBA)
- Profession: Farmer; Politician

Ronald A. Wait (April 15, 1944 – December 2024) was an American politician who was a Republican member of the Illinois House of Representatives, representing the 69th district from 1995 to 2011. He previously served as a member in the Illinois House of Representatives from 1983 to 1993.

== Legislative career ==
Wait was first elected in 1982 defeating Democratic candidate Judith A. Weiher. The 64th district included all of Boone County, eastern Winnebago County, and the northern half of McHenry County.

In the 1991 decennial redistricting process, Wait was redistricted into the 68th House District. The 68th included all of Boone County, eastern Winnebago County outside of Rockford, and a small portion of northern DeKalb County. In the 1992 general election, Wait was defeated by Democratic candidate Barbara Giolitto. In a 1994 rematch, the staunchly Republican district reverted to form and Wait was returned to the Illinois House of Representatives.

During the 2001 decennial redistricting process, Wait retained much of his previous district, but the district was renumbered from the 68th district to the 69th district. Wait opted to retire from the Illinois House of Representatives and run for a judgeship in the 17th Circuit Court of Illinois. In a three-way Republican primary, Wait lost to former Boone County State's Attorney Jim Hursh. Hursh would go on to lose to independent candidate Rob Tobin. Rockford City Councilman and fellow Republican Joe Sosnowski defeated Belvidere City Councilman and Democratic candidate Ray Pendzinski.

Wait's death was announced on December 30, 2024. He was 80.
