= Zwick =

Zwick is a German surname. It originates as a descriptor for a triangular piece of land, which would be applied to the person who worked it.

- Charles Zwick (1926–2018), American government official
- Edward Zwick (born 1952), American filmmaker
- Jill Zwick (born 1944), American politician
- Joel Zwick (born 1942), American director
- Johannes Zwick (c. 1496–1542), German Reformer and hymnwriter
- Justin Zwick (born 1983), American football player
- Luis Zwick (born 1994), German footballer (Dundee United FC)
- Rebecca Zwick, American expert in educational assessment and college admissions
- Spencer J. Zwick, finance chair of Mitt Romney presidential campaign, 2012
- W. Craig Zwick (born 1947), American religious leader
- Uri Zwick, Israeli computer scientist

== Other ==
- Zwick Roell Group, German manufacturing company
- Karloff–Zwick algorithm, a randomised approximation algorithm in computational complexity theory
- Zwick (card game), a north German card game for 2-4 players and the name of a sweep in that game
