= Jim Ryan (politician) =

American lawyer and politician (1946–2022)

40th Attorney General of Illinois
- In office January 9, 1995 – January 13, 2003
- Governor: Jim Edgar; George Ryan
- Preceded by: Roland Burris
- Succeeded by: Lisa Madigan

State's Attorney of DuPage County
- In office 1984 – January 9, 1995
- Preceded by: Joseph Fitzsimmons
- Succeeded by: Anthony Peccarelli

Personal details
- Born: February 21, 1946 Chicago, Illinois, U.S.
- Died: June 12, 2022 (aged 76) Elmhurst, Illinois, U.S.
- Party: Republican
- Spouse: Marie
- Children: 6
- Education: Benedictine University (BA); Illinois Institute of Technology (JD)

James E. Ryan (February 21, 1946 – June 12, 2022) was an American lawyer and politician who served two four-year terms as Illinois Attorney General. A Republican, he received his party's nomination and ran unsuccessfully for Governor of Illinois against Rod Blagojevich in 2002.

== Education ==
Ryan was born in Chicago on February 21, 1946 and grew up in the suburb of Villa Park, Illinois. His father, Edward Ryan, was a construction worker while his mother was an Italian immigrant housewife. As a youth, he was active in boxing and won the middleweight title in the 1963 Chicago Golden Gloves tournament when he was 17 years old. He attended a Benedictine-run high school, Saint Procopius Academy (now Benet Academy). Upon graduating, Ryan went on to study at Saint Procopius College (now Benedictine University), where he obtained his Bachelor of Arts degree in political science in 1968. He then went on to Chicago-Kent College of Law where he obtained his J.D. in 1971.

== Career in politics ==
Ryan entered the legal profession having found a position with the DuPage County State's Attorney office. After three years, he was promoted to first Assistant State's Attorney. In 1976, Ryan left the public sector to enter private practice. He worked at an independent law firm until 1984.

=== DuPage County State's Attorney ===
Ryan sought the Republican nomination for state's attorney in 1976 but was defeated by J. Michael Fitzsimons. After eight years in private practice, Ryan ran against Fitzsimmons again in the 1984 election, and defeated him in the Republican primary. He won the general election and was re-elected in 1988 and 1992. During his time as state's attorney, he served as president of the Illinois State's Attorney's Association.

=== Criticism of Prosecutorial Practices as DuPage County State's Attorney ===
During his tenure as DuPage County State's Attorney, Jim Ryan faced significant criticism for fostering a prosecutorial culture that prioritized convictions over justice, leading to several high-profile wrongful convictions. His office was accused of burying exculpatory evidence, relying on discredited forensic methods, and subverting due process to secure guilty verdicts.

==== The Rolando Cruz and Alejandro Hernandez Case ====
One of the most notorious examples of alleged misconduct involved the wrongful convictions of Rolando Cruz and Alejandro Hernandez for the 1983 abduction, rape, and murder of 10-year-old Jeanine Nicarico. Despite a confession from another suspect, Brian Dugan, whose statement was corroborated by significant evidence, Ryan's office continued to pursue Cruz and Hernandez, ultimately sentencing them to death. Key testimony against Cruz hinged on detectives' claims that he had revealed non-public details of the crime, a statement later proven false.

Evidence pointing to Dugan's sole culpability, including DNA testing that excluded Cruz and Hernandez, was downplayed or ignored for years. Ryan's office also relied on questionable forensic methods and resisted acknowledging errors in the case until the defendants were exonerated after years on death row. The case became emblematic of systemic issues within his office, including allegations of perjury and obstruction of justice by prosecutors and law enforcement.

==== The Stephen Buckley Case ====
Stephen Buckley, a co-defendant in the Nicarico case, was also targeted using questionable forensic evidence. Prosecutors leaned heavily on expert testimony linking a boot print at the crime scene to Buckley, despite later revelations that the methods used were unreliable. A mistrial was declared when the jury could not reach a verdict, and charges were eventually dropped. Critics argued that the case exemplified the office's reliance on shaky evidence to support its narratives.

==== The Marcus Lyons Case ====
In another instance of prosecutorial failure, Marcus Lyons was wrongfully convicted of a 1987 rape, primarily based on eyewitness testimony. Evidence that could have excluded Lyons as the perpetrator was either overlooked or suppressed. In 2007, DNA testing proved his innocence, underscoring the office's pattern of ignoring or withholding exculpatory evidence.

==== Allegations of Systemic Misconduct ====
Critics have described Ryan’s leadership as fostering a “win-at-all-costs” mentality, where evidence that contradicted the prosecution's case was buried or dismissed. Investigations into the Nicarico case revealed a troubling pattern of misconduct, leading to the indictment of four sheriff's deputies and three prosecutors on charges of perjury and obstruction of justice. Though they were acquitted, the county later paid $3.5 million in civil settlements to Cruz, Hernandez, and Buckley.

Ryan publicly apologized for the wrongful convictions years later, but the legacy of his tenure remains controversial. Advocacy groups and legal experts often cite his office as an example of systemic prosecutorial misconduct, warning of the consequences of unchecked power in the pursuit of convictions.

=== Illinois Attorney General ===
Ryan first ran for Illinois Attorney General in 1990, but was defeated by the Democrat, Roland Burris. He ran again four years later and won. He was reelected in 1998 with the endorsement of every major newspaper in the state. Ryan's most notable accomplishment as Illinois Attorney General was his $9.1 billion settlement from tobacco companies. He was the last Republican to serve as Illinois attorney general.

=== 2002 gubernatorial campaign ===
In 2002, Ryan was the Republican candidate for governor of Illinois, defeating two other candidates for the Republican nomination. However, as an incumbent member of the state government, his campaign was negatively affected by scandals engulfing the administration of outgoing Governor George Ryan (no relation). There was concern that the two men's similar names would also lead to confusion and further association between the two, so, according to the Chicago Tribune, Jim Ryan's campaign sent "a missive to newspaper editors urging them to use 'initials or full names in headlines and graphics' to make clear to readers whether they were referring to George Ryan or the attorney general". In the end, he lost the general election, winning 45% of the vote against Democratic U.S. Representative Rod Blagojevich, who won 52% of the vote.

=== 2010 gubernatorial campaign ===
Ryan again ran for governor in 2010 and at one point led in aggregate polling, but he eventually lost the Republican primary to State Senator Bill Brady, coming in fourth in a field of seven candidates. He was on the receiving end of a great deal of controversy for his conduct in the erroneous prosecution of Rolando Cruz and Alex Hernandez in the Jeanine Nicarico murder case.

=== Electoral history ===
- Illinois gubernatorial election, 2002
  1. Rod Blagojevich (D), 52%
  2. Jim Ryan (R), 45%
- Illinois Attorney General, 1998
  1. Jim Ryan (R) (inc.), 61%
  2. Miriam Santos (D), 37%
- Illinois Attorney General, 1994
  1. Jim Ryan (R), 54%
  2. Al Hofeld (D), 45%
- Illinois Attorney General, 1990
  1. Roland Burris (D), 52%
  2. Jim Ryan (R), 48%

== Career in academia ==
After the 2002 elections, Ryan returned to his alma mater, Benedictine University, where he was named a Distinguished Fellow and taught political science and criminal justice courses. In 2005, he established the Center for Civic Leadership at Benedictine.

== Personal life ==
Ryan and his wife, Marie, had six children.

In 1996, Jim Ryan was diagnosed with Stage 2 non-Hodgkin lymphoma and began chemotherapy. In January 1997, the youngest of Jim and Marie Ryan's six children, 12-year-old Anne Marie, collapsed and died of a brain tumor. In October 1997, Marie Ryan suffered what appeared to be a near-fatal heart attack as the couple walked near their home; the cause turned out to be a rare virus.

On October 8, 2007, Ryan's son, Patrick, died from a self-inflicted gunshot wound at the family's home in Elmhurst, aged 24.

=== Death ===
Ryan died at his home in DuPage County on June 12, 2022, aged 76, after what a family spokesperson described as "several lengthy illnesses".

Legal offices
Preceded by Roland Burris	Attorney General of Illinois; 1995–2003	Succeeded by Lisa Madigan
Party political offices
Preceded by Bernard Carey	Republican nominee for Attorney General of Illinois; 1990, 1994, 1998	Succeeded by Joe Birkett
Preceded by George Ryan	Republican nominee for Governor of Illinois; 2002	Succeeded by Judy Topinka
