= Roland Burris =

American politician and attorney (born 1937)

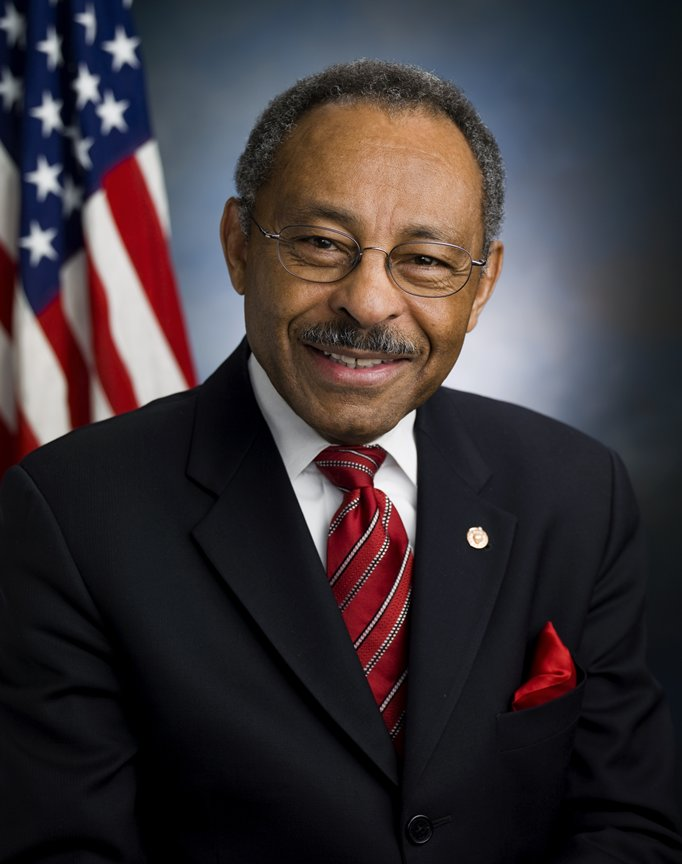
- Official portrait, 2009

United States Senator from Illinois
- In office January 12, 2009 – November 29, 2010
- Appointed by: Rod Blagojevich
- Preceded by: Barack Obama
- Succeeded by: Mark Kirk

39th Attorney General of Illinois
- In office January 14, 1991 – January 9, 1995
- Governor: Jim Edgar
- Preceded by: Neil Hartigan
- Succeeded by: Jim Ryan

3rd Comptroller of Illinois
- In office January 8, 1979 – January 14, 1991
- Governor: Jim Thompson
- Preceded by: Michael Bakalis
- Succeeded by: Dawn Clark Netsch

Personal details
- Born: Roland Wallace Burris; August 3, 1937 (age 89) Centralia, Illinois, U.S.
- Party: Democratic
- Spouse: Berlean Miller
- Children: 2
- Education: Southern Illinois University, Carbondale (BA); Howard University (JD)
- Burris's voice Burris supporting the District of Columbia Voting Rights Act. Recorded February 25, 2009

Roland Wallace Burris (born August 3, 1937) is an American politician and attorney who served as Attorney General of Illinois from 1991 to 1995 and as a United States senator from Illinois from 2009 until 2010. A member of the Democratic Party, Burris was the first African-American elected to statewide office in Illinois.

Burris was first elected to public office in 1978, becoming the Comptroller of Illinois, and was reelected in 1982 and 1986. He was elected Illinois Attorney General in 1990, becoming the second African-American state attorney general in U.S. history. Burris unsuccessfully sought the Democratic nomination for Governor of Illinois in 1994.

Burris ran four other unsuccessful campaigns for public office. These include campaigns for governor in 1998 and 2002, in both of which he lost in the Democratic primary. Burris also ran as an independent candidate in the 1995 Chicago mayoral election, losing to incumbent Richard M. Daley by a significant margin.

In January 2009, Governor Rod Blagojevich appointed Burris to the U.S. Senate seat vacated by Barack Obama, who resigned to become president of the United States. The appointment was controversial due to an ongoing corruption investigation into Blagojevich and rumors that he was paid for the appointment. Burris was never convicted of any wrongdoing.

== Early life, family and education ==
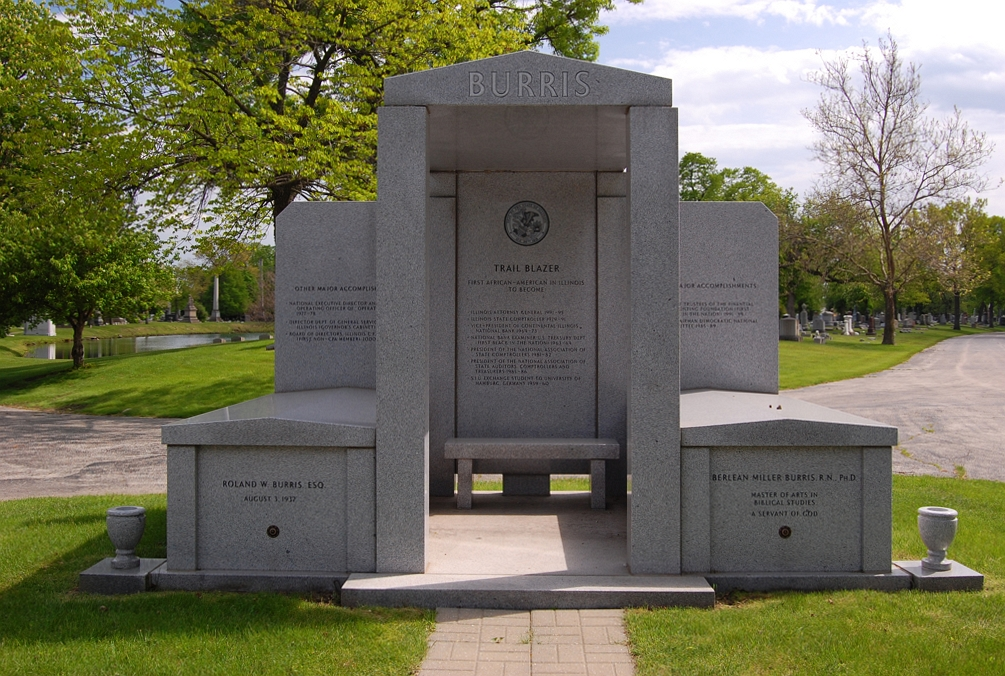
Roland Burris mausoleum in 2008

Burris was born and raised in the small community of Centralia in southern Illinois. The Burris family traces its roots to slaves in the American South, mainly Georgia, South Carolina, and Tennessee. Burris is a 1955 graduate of Centralia High School. He attended Southern Illinois University Carbondale, receiving a Bachelor of Arts degree in political science in 1959. He was an exchange student on scholarship to study International Law at the University of Hamburg in Germany. He earned his Juris Doctor degree from the Howard University School of Law in 1963.

== Early career ==
After graduating from law school, Burris became National Bank Examiner for the Office of the Comptroller of the Currency for the U.S. Treasury Department. In that capacity, he traveled throughout the Midwest, examining banks in Illinois, Indiana, Michigan and Wisconsin. The adversities he faced as an African-American bank examiner in the early 1960s were described in some detail in the February 2013 edition of SuperVisions (the OCC's employee newsletter). From 1964 to 1973, Burris worked at Continental Illinois National Bank and Trust Company (now Bank of America), serving as tax accountant, tax consultant, commercial banking officer, and vice president. He headed a commercial group that covered government guaranteed loans and minority business banking.

In 1973, Illinois Governor Dan Walker appointed Burris Director of the Department of Central Management Services. He served until 1977.

Burris was National Executive Director and Chief Operating Officer for Operation PUSH from January to October 1977. He was in private law practice from October 1977 to January 1979, and again from June 1995 to present.

In 1985, Burris was selected for the position of vice-chairman of the Democratic National Committee. This decision, coming on the heels of the party's landslide loss to President Ronald Reagan, generated controversy, since Gary, Indiana Mayor Richard Hatcher, who had served as presidential candidate Jesse Jackson's campaign manager, was the nominee of the party's Black Caucus. Jackson refused to recognize Burris's selection, claiming that it was part of an effort by the Democratic Party leadership to pander to the white American electorate.

== State politics ==
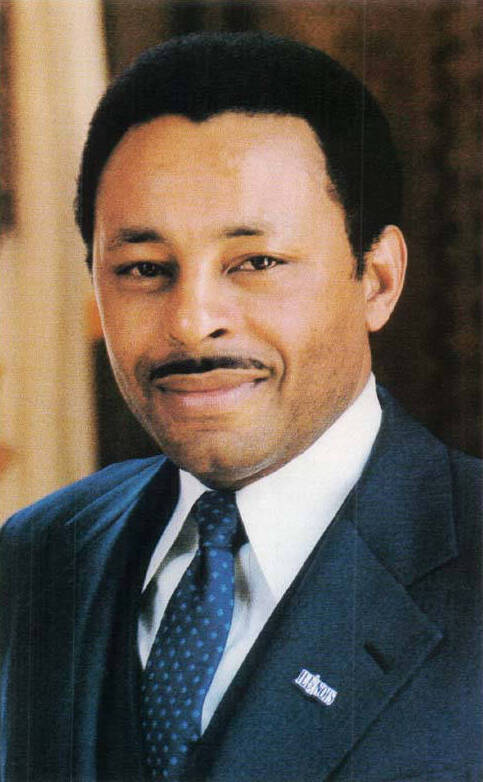
Burris, circa 1985

Burris sought the Democratic nomination for Illinois Comptroller in 1976, but was defeated by Michael Bakalis. In 1978 Bakalis did not seek reelection as comptroller, choosing to run for governor, and Burris won the comptrollership. He was reelected as comptroller in 1982 and 1986. He was the first African American elected to statewide office in Illinois. While serving as comptroller, Burris was an unsuccessful candidate for the Democratic nomination for U.S. Senate in 1984, losing to Paul Simon, who defeated the incumbent, Republican Charles Percy.

Burris was elected Illinois Attorney General in 1990. He was the second African American ever elected to a state office of attorney general in the U.S., after Edward Brooke. He served from 1991 to 1995, supervising over 500 lawyers. In 1985, 19-year-old Rolando Cruz was tried, convicted, and sentenced to death along with a co-defendant in a DuPage County Circuit Court for the kidnapping, rape, and murder of a 10-year-old child. In 1992, Assistant Attorney General Mary Brigid Kenney, whom Burris had assigned to fight Cruz's appeal, sent Burris a memo identifying numerous errors in the investigation and trial in Cruz's initial conviction, and refusing to participate in upholding what she considered a wrongful conviction. Burris ignored Kenney's warnings, and she resigned in protest, writing to Burris, "I was being asked to help execute an innocent man... Unfortunately, you have seen fit to ignore the evidence in this case." In September 1995, DNA tests showed that neither Cruz nor his co-defendant contributed the semen found at the crime scene, exonerating them. In 2002, Governor George Ryan fully pardoned Cruz and declared a moratorium on the death penalty in Illinois, calling the system "fraught with error".

In 1993, Burris, an advocate for a national handgun ban, helped organize Chicago's first Gun Turn-in Day. The next year, he admitted that he kept a handgun in his home and had not turned it into police as he had urged others to do. A spokesman said that Burris had "forgotten about" his gun.

In 1994, Burris was an unsuccessful candidate for the Democratic nomination for governor of Illinois. He had been favored for much of the primary campaign, but he and Cook County Board President Richard Phelan both lost to Comptroller Dawn Clark Netsch, who had a strong late showing in the final weeks of the campaign. In the general election, Netsch lost to incumbent Republican Governor Jim Edgar. That year, Democrats lost every single race for statewide office.

In 1995, Burris ran as an independent for Mayor of Chicago, losing to incumbent Richard M. Daley. In 1998, he again unsuccessfully sought the Democratic nomination for governor. In that race, Burris caused controversy by calling his primary opponents—Jim Burns, Glenn Poshard (who eventually won the nomination) and John Schmidt—"non-qualified white boys". During his 2002 run for governor against, among others, Rod Blagojevich, he was supported by, among others, Barack Obama.

=== IFDA scandal ===
When Burris was state comptroller in the 1980s, his office issued a license to the Illinois Funeral Directors Association (IFDA) to manage a pre-need funeral trust fund. A provision was also issued allowing trustees to take 25% of the fund's earnings as management fees.

The fund went into deficits beginning in 2001, leading to the revocation of the IFDA license in September 2007 and a $59 million deficit by October 2008. Burris acted as a lobbyist for the IFDA trust from early 2007 through 2008. He has refused to comment on the scandal, saying, "it was 30 years ago". Consequently, a group of funeral directors (plaintiffs in a suit filed in 2009 against the IFDA alleging a Ponzi scheme) have subpoenaed Burris to find out the nature of his involvement during his time as lobbyist. The lawsuit is currently ongoing.

== Career outside politics ==
Burris is manager/CEO of Burris & Lebed Consulting, LLC, which was formed in 2002.

Burris's cameo in The Fugitive

Burris was featured briefly in a scene from the Hollywood blockbuster The Fugitive. A scene in the movie, which was mainly shot in Chicago, shows Burris in the St. Patrick's Day parade, waving to spectators.

== U.S. Senate ==
=== Senate appointment ===
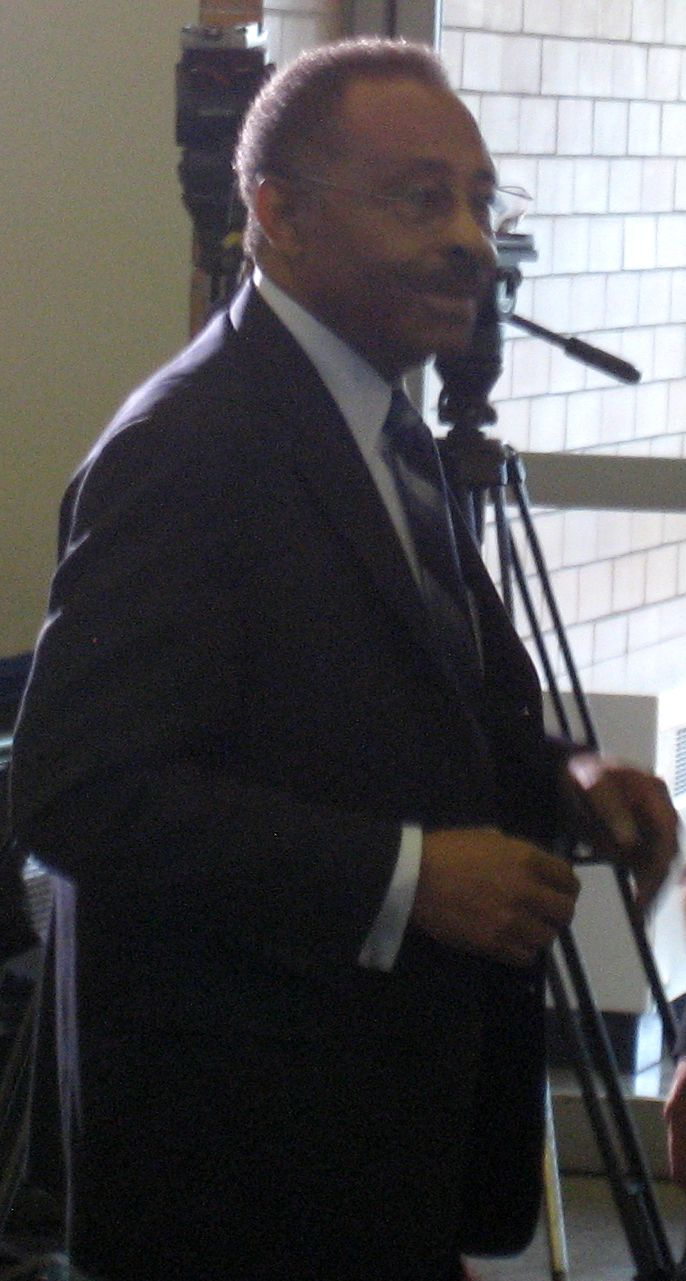
Burris speaking in 2009

On December 14, 2008, Burris suggested himself as a possible caretaker for the United States Senate seat vacated by President-elect Barack Obama, saying he would not run for election if appointed. Before this suggestion, Governor Blagojevich had been considering appointing Oprah Winfrey, but feared she would not take his call. This suggestion came in the wake of an FBI investigation regarding charges of corruption against Blagojevich for seeking bribes in a pay-to-play scheme for the empty Senate seat and other offenses. Blagojevich said he appointed Burris because he believed Burris's ego made him the only person who would fight to be seated.

Burris filed an affidavit on January 5, in advance of his testimony before the Illinois impeachment committee, in which he wrote, "prior to the December 26, 2008, telephone call from Mr. Adams Jr., there was not any contact between myself or any of my representatives with Governor Blagojevich or any of his representatives regarding my appointment to the United States Senate." But according to the FBI wiretap transcript recorded November 13, Burris told the governor's brother Rob Blagojevich, who chaired the governor's reelection campaign, that he understood that Blagojevich wanted money, that he was "trying to figure out how to deal with this and still be in the consideration for the appointment", and that he was willing to "personally do something", including write the governor a personal check. He said he realized, however, that such an action might look like he was trying to buy the seat and wanted to find a way to avoid that perception.

On December 30, 2008, Blagojevich announced that he was naming Burris to the seat. Illinois Secretary of State Jesse White registered the appointment in the official records of Illinois on December 31, 2008, but declined to sign the Senate's certification form.

On January 5, 2009, Secretary of the United States Senate Nancy Erickson rejected Burris's certificate of appointment to the Senate as invalid. Erickson cited Senate Rule 2 as the reason for the rejection. Because White had refused to sign the certificate, Erickson concluded that the certificate did not conform to Senate Rule 2. Senate Majority Leader Harry Reid and Illinois's senior Senator Dick Durbin agreed with Erickson that the Senate rule required the secretary of state's signature.

Reid initially said that the Senate would not seat Burris, citing Article I, Section 5 of the United States Constitution, which reads, "Each House shall be the Judge of the Elections, Returns and Qualifications of its own Members." Before Burris was in contention, Reid and other senators had said they would use Article I authority against any appointment by Blagojevich. The Senate could also have referred the appointment to the Senate Rules Committee, thus stalling it until Blagojevich's status was settled. Some Democrats, including Senate Rules Committee chair Dianne Feinstein and the Congressional Black Caucus, spoke in favor of seating Burris.

Burris appeared in Washington at the January 6 congressional swearing-in ceremony to claim his seat, but was denied entry into the Senate chamber. He and his lawyers insisted that he was "now the junior senator from the state of Illinois", though technically he was not a senator and could not be one until being administered the oath of office.

On January 9, 2009, the Illinois Supreme Court ruled that the appointment required only the governor's signature, not the secretary of state's. It also said Illinois is not obligated to use, and hence its secretary of state is not required to sign, the Senate's "recommended" certification form. The State Supreme Court noted that a different form was available: White had already registered the appointment in Illinois's official records, and Illinois law requires the secretary of state to provide a certified copy, with signature and seal, of any of the state's official records to anyone willing to pay the fee. It suggested that Burris simply obtain a certified copy of the appointment registration. In Burris v. White, the State Supreme Court not only declared that the form of certificate contained in rule II of the Standing Rules of the U.S. Senate was, according to its own terms, only a recommended form, but further remarked that "no explanation has been given as to how any rule of the Senate, whether it be formal or merely a matter of tradition, could supersede the authority to fill vacancies conferred on the states by the federal constitution". After the ruling, White gave Burris a certified copy of the appointment's registration, and Burris delivered that copy, bearing the State Seal, to the Secretary of the Senate. On January 12, 2009, after the Secretary of the Senate announced that she and the Senate Parliamentarian deemed Burris's credentials valid, Senate leaders seated Burris. Burris was sworn in by Vice President Dick Cheney on January 15, 2009.

Burris filed an affidavit with the Illinois House committee that oversaw Governor Blagojevich's impeachment, dated February 4, to supplement his earlier answer to a question posed by the committee. Burris acknowledged that Blagojevich had requested "assistance in fund-raising" three times in the weeks and months before Blagojevich appointed him. Illinois House Republicans considered this at odds with Burris's testimony during the impeachment trial and said they were considering a perjury investigation. Democratic officials, including Illinois Attorney General Lisa Madigan, supported an investigation. Burris said he told the governor's brother Rob Blagojevich that he could not donate to Governor Blagojevich because "it could be viewed as an attempt to curry favor with him regarding his decision to appoint a successor to President Obama" and that he "did not raise or donate any funds to Governor Blagojevich after the fundraiser on June 27, 2008."

On February 16, Burris told reporters that the governor's brother had asked him to raise $10,000 to $15,000 for the governor in October 2008. Burris said that after the phone call, he "talked to some people about trying to see if we could put a fundraiser on" but that no one was willing to donate to the governor. Burris says he spoke with the governor's brother again around November 10 to tell him that his efforts to raise money were unsuccessful, but that he might be able to talk other people into donating about $1,000 to the governor. Burris also said that around November 15 or 16, he told the governor's brother that he could not raise any money for the governor, nor would he donate to the governor himself.

On February 17, the Sangamon County State's Attorney's Office released a statement saying it was investigating Burris for perjury connected to his testimony to the panel of the Illinois House of Representatives investigating the governor's impeachment. The Senate Ethics Committee was also reportedly preparing a preliminary investigation into the matter.

On February 18, the Chicago Tribune called on Burris to resign. In the editorial, the board wrote, "His protests that he had nothing to hide just don't square with his obvious attempts to hide something." The editorial board of The Washington Post also called for Burris's resignation, saying his story had "more twists than the Chicago 'L'" because Burris had offered five varying explanations, three of them under oath, of his contact with associates of Blagojevich. Burris refused to resign despite calls to do so from new Illinois Governor Pat Quinn and statements from fellow Illinois Senator Dick Durbin that Durbin would not support Burris for election.

On March 7, the Chicago Sun-Times reported that Sangamon County State's Attorney John Schmidt has asked the FBI for recordings of wiretapped phone calls between Burris and Blagojevich for a perjury investigation. On May 26, 2009, the recordings were released. In them, Burris promised to "personally do something" for Blagojevich's campaign. During the conversation, Burris and Blagojevich discussed the possibility that Burris might raise campaign money on a larger scale, and Burris said, "I know I could give him a check myself."

A few days later, the Associated Press reported: "When asked in a recent interview with The Associated Press how the scandal back home has affected him, Burris made a sweeping gesture with his hands and literally brushed the matter aside."

On May 28, 2009, Democratic Illinois Representative Jack Franks and Republican Representative Jim Durkin, the ranking Republican on the impeachment panel that had questioned Burris during his January 8 testimony, accused Burris of perjury and called for him to be removed from office. In 2009, Burris was named one of the 15 Most Corrupt Members of Congress by the watchdog group Citizens for Responsibility and Ethics in Washington.

On June 19, 2009, Sangamon County State's Attorney John Schmidt announced that Burris would not face criminal perjury charges, saying that Burris's promise to "personally do something" for Blagojevich was too vague to rise to the level of criminality. Burris praised the announcement, saying, "The truth has prevailed"; meanwhile, Durkin criticized Schmidt's decision, saying, "They're all contradictions to his previously sworn statements. To me, it's a pretty strong case."

On November 20, 2009, the Senate Ethics Committee wrote Burris a letter saying that although no ethics charges would be pursued, "The Committee found that you should have known that you were providing incorrect, inconsistent, misleading, or incomplete information to the public, the Senate and those conducting legitimate inquiries into your appointment to the Senate."

=== Senate term ===
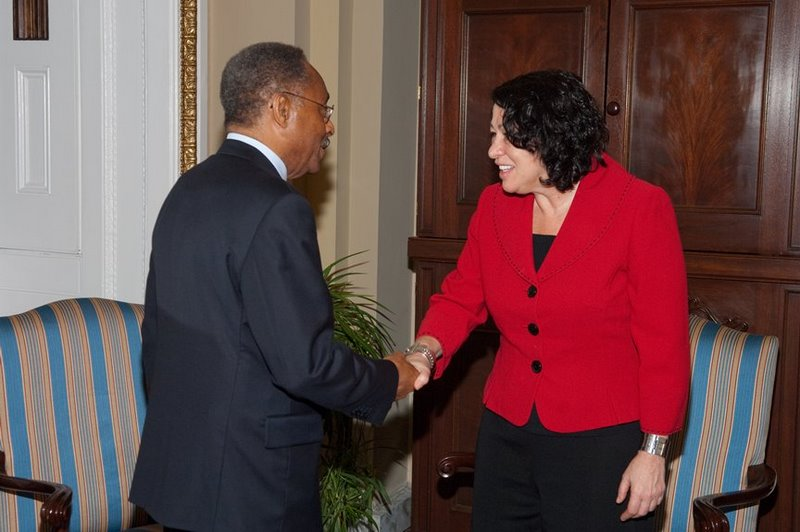
Senator Burris meeting with Supreme Court nominee Sonia Sotomayor in June 2009

Burris was the only black U.S. senator during his term in office. After he left office, it was over two years until the next black senator, Tim Scott, a Republican and the first black senator elected in the South since Reconstruction, took office in 2013.

==== Committee assignments ====
- Committee on Armed Services
  - Subcommittee on Airland
  - Subcommittee on Personnel
  - Subcommittee on Readiness and Management Support
- Committee on Homeland Security and Governmental Affairs
  - Subcommittee on Federal Financial Management, Government Information, Federal Services and International Security
  - Subcommittee on Oversight of Government Management, the Federal Workforce, and the District of Columbia
  - Ad Hoc Subcommittee on Disaster Recovery
- Committee on Veterans' Affairs

=== 2010 election campaign plans ===
According to Federal Election Commission records, on January 2, 2009, before the controversy over his conflicting explanations of his fundraising activity on Blagojevich's behalf, Burris signed a statement of candidacy for the 2010 election. Durbin said, "it would be extremely difficult for him to be successful", and on April 16, the Chicago Tribune reported that Burris had raised only $845 for his campaign. On July 9, the Chicago Sun-Times reported that Burris would not run for election in 2010, and Burris made an official announcement in Chicago on July 10 that he would retire when his term ended.

Burris's term ended on November 29, 2010, with the swearing-in of his elected successor, Mark Kirk, who had won the special election to complete the term in addition to a full six-year term. Burris cited the high cost of running a campaign as a major reason for not seeking election, saying he would rather continue to serve the people of Illinois than raise money for a campaign.

== Personal life ==
Burris is married to Berlean M. Burris. They have two children and one grandchild.

Burris has built a mausoleum for himself in Oak Woods Cemetery on Chicago's South Side. His tombstone reads "TRAIL BLAZER" and includes a list of his accomplishments, with space left for future ones.

== See also ==
- List of African-American firsts
- List of African-American United States senators
- Powell v. McCormack

Party political offices
Preceded by Michael Bakalis	Democratic nominee for Comptroller of Illinois; 1978, 1982, 1986	Succeeded by Dawn Clark Netsch
Preceded by Neil Hartigan	Democratic nominee for Attorney General of Illinois; 1990	Succeeded by Al Hofeld
Political offices
Preceded by Michael Bakalis	Comptroller of Illinois; 1979–1991	Succeeded by Dawn Clark Netsch
Legal offices
Preceded by Neil Hartigan	Attorney General of Illinois; 1991–1995	Succeeded by Jim Ryan
U.S. Senate
Preceded by Barack Obama	United States Senator (Class 3) from Illinois; 2009–2010; Served alongside: Dick Durbin	Succeeded by Mark Kirk
U.S. order of precedence (ceremonial)
Preceded by Mo Cowan as Former U.S. Senator	Order of precedence of the United States	Succeeded by Donald Stewart as Former U.S. Senator
