= 1982 Illinois elections =

- November 2, 1982
- Turnout: 64.65%

Elections were held in Illinois on Tuesday, November 2, 1982.

Primaries were held on March 16.

== Election information ==
1982 was a midterm election year in the United States.

Amid the ongoing recession and resultant unpopularity of incumbent Republican president Ronald Reagan, Democrats made significant gains in the national elections for the United States House of Representatives and in the gubernatorial elections. In Illinois, Democrats made gains in the House of Representatives elections. Democrats also managed to flip control of the office of Illinois Attorney General. While the election was incredibly close, Republican James R. Thompson managed to retain his governorship.

=== Turnout ===
Turnout in the primary election was 27.38%, with a total of 1,622,410 ballots cast. 949,426 Democratic and 672,984 Republican primary ballots were cast.

Turnout during the general election was 64.65%, with 3,856,875 ballots cast.

=== Convictions for fraud ===
There were "62 indictments and 58 convictions, many involving precinct captains and election officials. The grand jury concluded that 100,000 fraudulent votes had been cast in the city ... Authorities found massive fraud involving vote buying and ballots cast by others in the names of registered voters. In one case, a ballot punched for the Democratic slate had been tabulated 198 times." The case was prosecuted in November 1982 by US Attorney Dan K. Webb.

The gubernatorial election result has been questioned. Some Democrats have alleged that fraud might have been committed by Republicans in areas outside Chicago to secure Thompson his victory. In 2016, Rudy Giuliani suggested that the gubernatorial results had been fraudulent on the part of Chicago Democrats.

In January 1983, the Illinois Supreme Court rejected a petition by Democratic gubernatorial nominee Adlai Stevenson III for a full statewide recount, with the majority opinion finding there to be insufficient evidence of either mistakes, fraud, or irregularities to warrant a recount

== Federal elections ==
=== United States House ===
Illinois had lost two congressional districts (the 23rd and 24th) in reapportionment following the 1980 United States census. All 22 of Illinois' remaining seats in the United States House of Representatives were up for election in 1982

Before the election, there were 14 Republican and 10 Democratic seats. In 1982, 12 Democrats and 9 Republicans were elected from Illinois.

== State elections ==
=== Governor and Lieutenant Governor ===
1982 Illinois gubernatorial election
- November 2, 1982
- Turnout: 61.58%
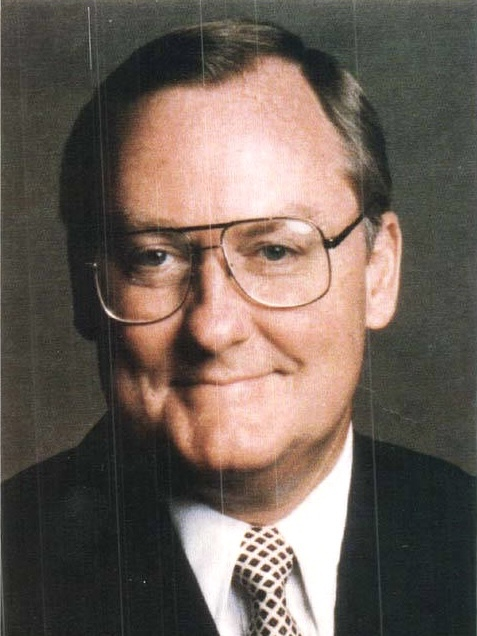

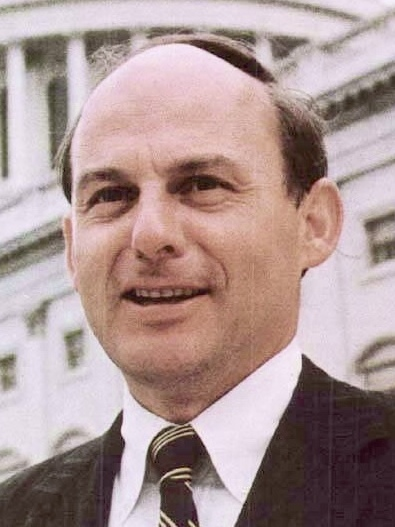
| Nominee | James R. Thompson | Adlai Stevenson III |
| Party | Republican | Democratic |
| Running mate | George Ryan | Grace Mary Stern |
| Popular vote | 1,816,101 | 1,811,027 |
| Percentage | 49.4% | 49.3% |
- County results Thompson: 40-50% 50-60% 60-70% 70-80% Stevenson: 40–50% 50–60% 60–70%
Governor before election
James R. Thompson
Republican
Elected Governor
James R. Thompson
Republican

Incumbent Governor James R. Thompson, a Republican, narrowly won reelection to a third term, defeating Democrat Adlai Stevenson III by merely 5,074 votes. George Ryan joined Thompson on the Republican ticket, and won a first term as Lieutenant Governor.

The election was surprisingly close, as, before the election, Thompson had been favored by polls and predictions to win by roughly twenty percentage points.

Gubernatorial election
| Party | Candidate | Votes | % |
|---|---|---|---|
| Republican | James R. Thompson (incumbent) / George Ryan | 1,816,101 | 49.44 |
| Democratic | Adlai Stevenson III / Grace Mary Stern | 1,811,027 | 49.30 |
| Libertarian | Bea Armstrong/ David L. Kelley | 24,417 | 0.66 |
| Taxpayers | John E. Roche/ Melvin "Mel" Jones | 22,001 | 0.60 |
| Write-in | Others | 161 | 0.00 |
| Total votes | | 3,673,707 | 100 |

=== Attorney General ===
1982 Illinois Attorney General election
- November 2, 1982
- Turnout: 60.96%
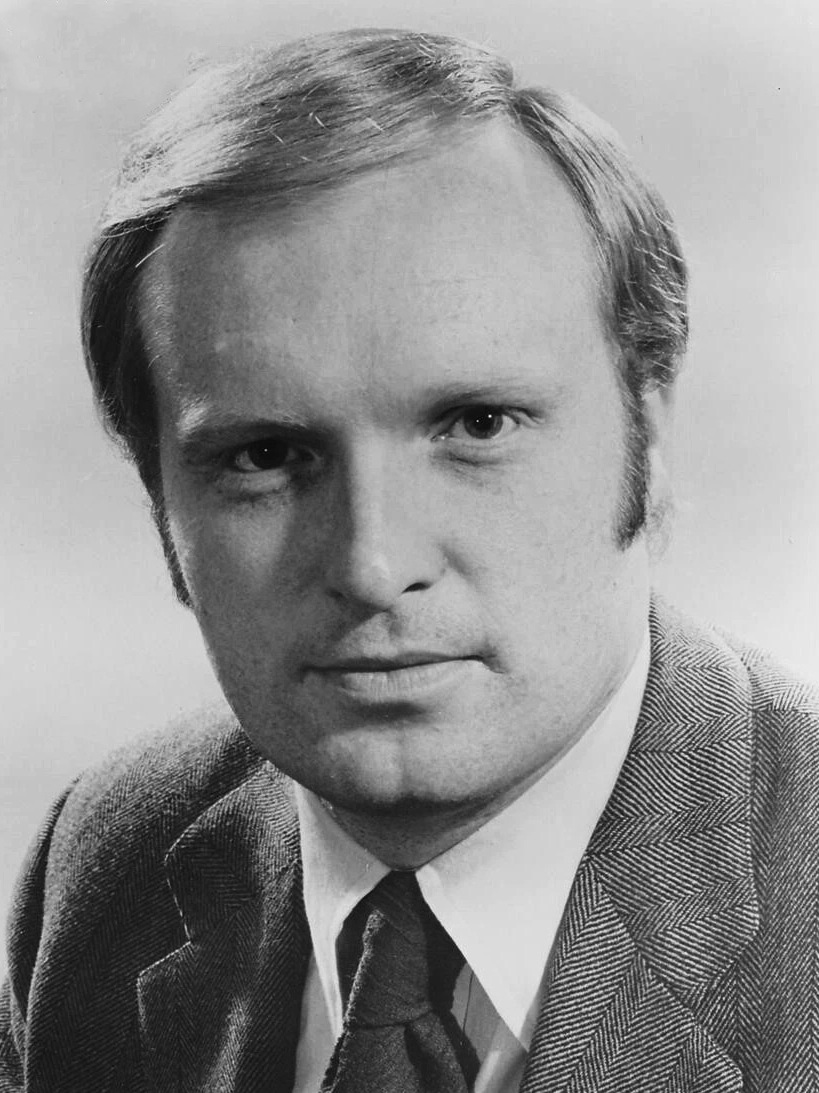

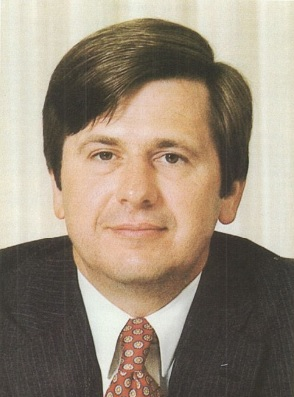
| Nominee | Neil Hartigan | Ty Fahner |
| Party | Democratic | Republican |
| Popular vote | 2,064,196 | 1,519,507 |
| Percentage | 56.76% | 41.78% |
- County results Hartigan: 40–50% 50–60% 60–70% Fahner: 40–50% 50–60% 60–70%
Attorney General before election
Tyrone C. Fahner
Republican
Elected Attorney General
Neil Hartigan
Democratic

Incumbent Attorney General Tyrone C. Fahner, a Republican appointed in 1980, lost reelection to Democrat Neil Hartigan.

==== Democratic primary ====
Attorney General Democratic primary
| Party | Candidate | Votes | % |
|---|---|---|---|
| Democratic | Neil F. Hartigan | 606,662 | 99.99 |
| Write-in | Others | 48 | 0.01 |
| Total votes | | 606,710 | 100 |

==== Republican primary ====
Attorney General Republican primary
| Party | Candidate | Votes | % |
|---|---|---|---|
| Republican | Ty Fahner (incumbent) | 524,853 | 100 |
| Write-in | Others | 27 | 0.01 |
| Total votes | | 524,880 | 100 |

==== General election ====
Attorney General election
| Party | Candidate | Votes | % |
|---|---|---|---|
| Democratic | Neil F. Hartigan | 2,064,196 | 56.76 |
| Republican | Ty Fahner (incumbent) | 1,519,507 | 41.78 |
| Libertarian | Natalie Loder Clark | 28,074 | 0.77 |
| Taxpayers | Gordon James Arnett | 24,719 | 0.68 |
| Write-in | Others | 12 | 0.00 |
| Total votes | | 3,636,508 | 100 |

=== Secretary of State ===
1982 Illinois Secretary of State election
- November 2, 1986
- Turnout: 61.87%
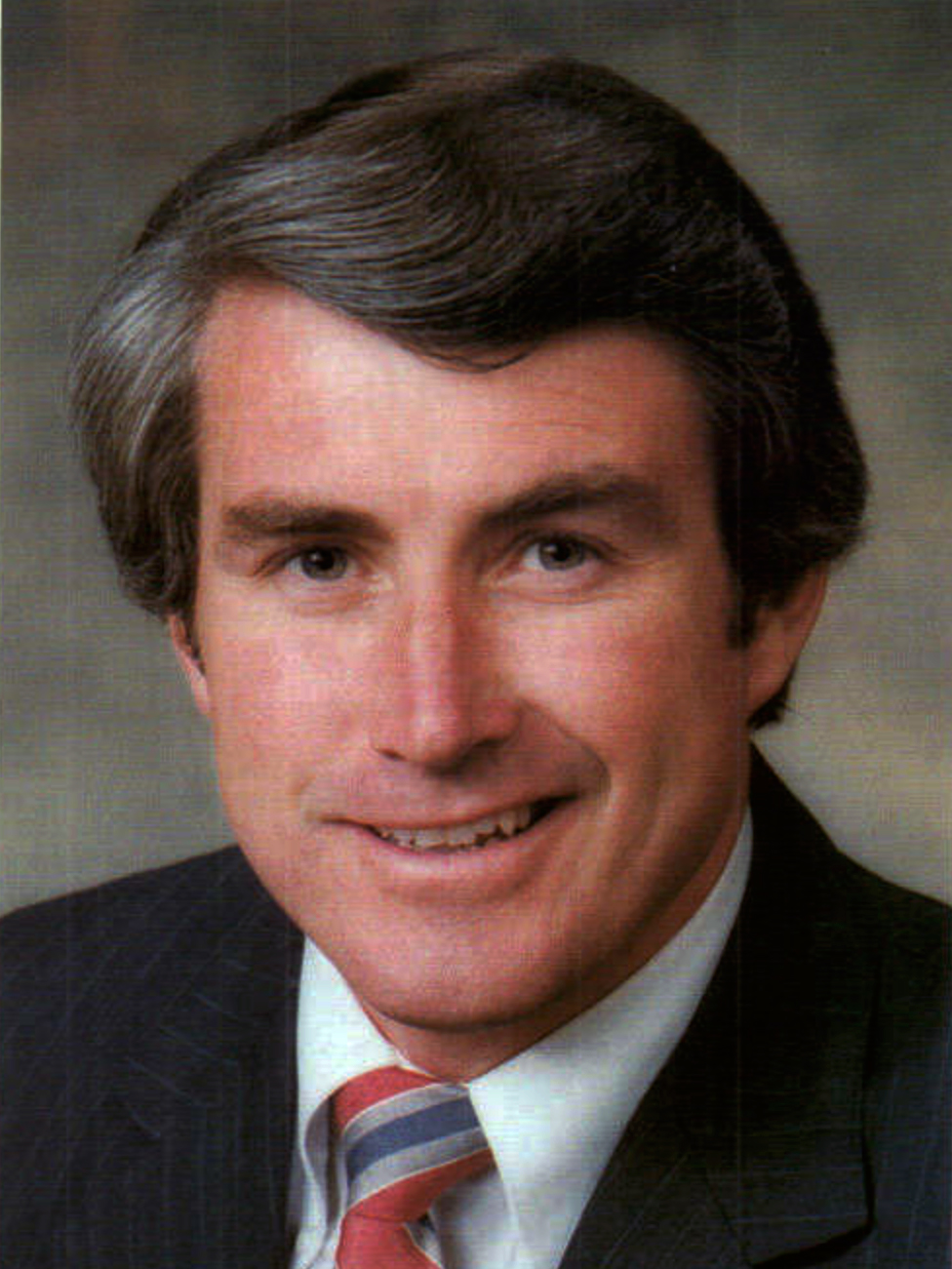

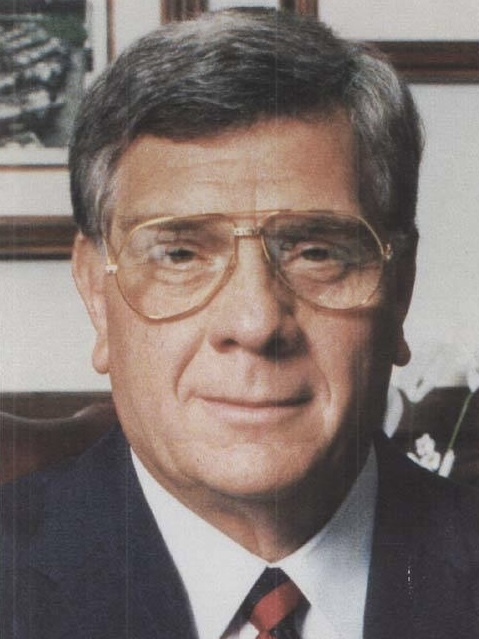
| Nominee | Jim Edgar | Jerome Cosentino |
| Party | Republican | Democratic |
| Popular vote | 1,942,664 | 1,709,008 |
| Percentage | 52.64% | 46.31% |
- County results Edgar: 50–60% 60–70% 70–80% Cosentino: 40–50% 50–60% 60–70%
Secretary of State before election
Jim Edgar
Republican
Elected Secretary of State
Jim Edgar
Republican

Incumbent Secretary of State Jim Edgar, a Republican first appointed in 1981, was elected to a full term.

==== Democratic primary ====
Secretary of State Democratic primary
| Party | Candidate | Votes | % |
|---|---|---|---|
| Democratic | Jerry Cosentino | 614,540 | 100 |
| Write-in | Others | 23 | 0.00 |
| Total votes | | 614,563 | 100 |

==== Republican primary ====
Secretary of State Republican primary
| Party | Candidate | Votes | % |
|---|---|---|---|
| Republican | Jim Edgar (incumbent) | 558,327 | 100 |
| Write-in | Others | 15 | 0.00 |
| Total votes | | 558,342 | 100 |

==== General election ====
Secretary of State election
| Party | Candidate | Votes | % |
|---|---|---|---|
| Republican | Jim Edgar (incumbent) | 1,942,664 | 52.64 |
| Democratic | Jerome Cosentino | 1,709,008 | 46.31 |
| Taxpayers | Kenneth J. Prazak | 19,728 | 0.53 |
| Libertarian | Roger Hosbein | 19,216 | 0.52 |
| Write-in | Others | 9 | 0.00 |
| Total votes | | 3,690,625 | 100 |

=== Comptroller ===
1982 Illinois State Comptroller election
- November 2, 1982
- Turnout: 60.56%
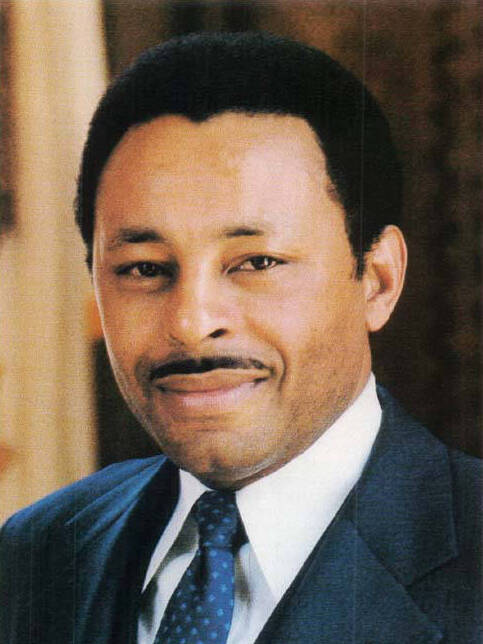

| Nominee | Roland Burris | Calvin Skinner |
| Party | Democratic | Republican |
| Popular vote | 1,696,414 | 1,440,747 |
| Percentage | 54.07% | 45.93% |
- County results Burris: 50–60% 60–70% 70–80% Skinner: 40–50% 50–60% 60–70%
State Comptroller before election
Roland Burris
Democratic
Elected State Comptroller
Roland Burris
Democratic

Incumbent Comptroller Roland Burris, a Democrat, won reelection to a second term.

==== Democratic primary ====
Incumbent Roland Burris won renomination unopposed.

Secretary of State Democratic primary
| Party | Candidate | Votes | % |
|---|---|---|---|
| Democratic | Roland W. Burris (incumbent) | 630,921 | 100 |
| Write-in | Others | 25 | 0.00 |
| Total votes | | 630,946 | 100 |

==== Republican primary ====
Former State Representative Calvin Skinner won the Republican primary unopposed.

Secretary of State Republican primary
| Party | Candidate | Votes | % |
|---|---|---|---|
| Republican | Cal Skinner Jr. | 512,639 | 100 |
| Write-in | Others | 27 | 0.01 |
| Total votes | | 512,666 | 100 |

==== General election ====
Comptroller election
| Party | Candidate | Votes | % |
|---|---|---|---|
| Democratic | Roland W. Burris (incumbent) | 2,327,779 | 64.43 |
| Republican | Cal Skinner Jr. | 1,210,467 | 33.50 |
| Taxpayers | Leland W. Bormann | 37,835 | 1.05 |
| Libertarian | Stephen M. Johnson | 36,856 | 1.02 |
| Write-in | Others | 12 | 0.00 |
| Total votes | | 3,612,949 | 100 |

=== Treasurer ===
1982 Illinois State Treasurer election
- November 2, 1982
- Turnout: 60.47%
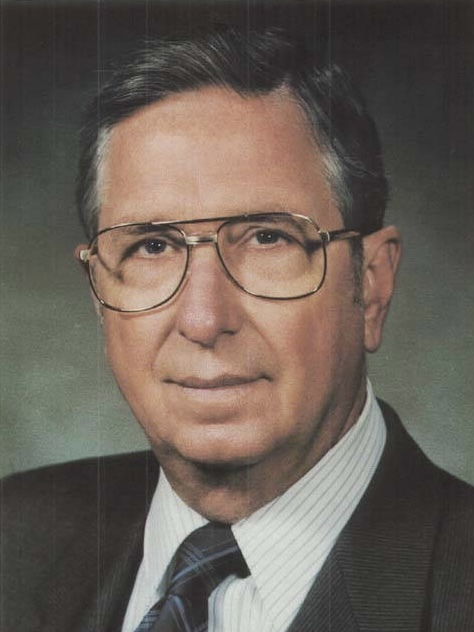

| Nominee | James Donnewald | John P. Dailey |
| Party | Democratic | Republican |
| Popular vote | 1,940,828 | 1,573,496 |
| Percentage | 53.81% | 43.62% |
- County results Donnewald: 40–50% 50–60% 60–70% Dailey: 40–50% 50–60% 60–70%
Treasurer before election
Jerome Cosentino
Democratic
Elected Treasurer
James Donnewald
Democratic

Incumbent Treasurer Jerome Cosentino, a Democrat, did not run for a second term, instead opting to run for Secretary of State. Democrat James Donnewald was elected to succeed him in office.

==== Democratic primary ====
Treasurer Democratic primary
| Party | Candidate | Votes | % |
|---|---|---|---|
| Democratic | James H. Donnewald | 579,254 | 100 |
| Write-in | Others | 8 | 0.00 |
| Total votes | | 579,262 | 100 |

==== Republican primary ====
Treasurer Republican primary
| Party | Candidate | Votes | % |
|---|---|---|---|
| Republican | John P. Dailey | 353,106 | 60.61 |
| Republican | W. Robert Blair | 229,487 | 39.39 |
| Write-in | Others | 8 | 0.00 |
| Total votes | | 582,601 | 100 |

==== General election ====
Treasurer election
| Party | Candidate | Votes | % |
|---|---|---|---|
| Democratic | James H. Donnewald | 1,940,828 | 53.81 |
| Republican | John P. Dailey | 1,573,496 | 43.62 |
| Taxpayers | Naomi F. Wilson | 60,251 | 1.67 |
| Libertarian | Walter E. Edge | 32,452 | 0.90 |
| Write-in | Paul Salander | 22 | 0.00 |
| Total votes | | 3,607,049 | 100 |

=== State Senate ===
As this was the first election after a redistricting, all of the seats of the Illinois Senate were up for election in 1982. Democrats retained control of the chamber.

=== State House of Representatives ===
All of the seats in the Illinois House of Representatives were up for election in 1982. Democrats flipped control of the chamber.

=== Trustees of University of Illinois ===
1982 Trustees of University of Illinois election
- November 2, 1982

An election was held for three of nine seats for Trustees of University of Illinois system.

The election saw the reelection incumbents William D. Forsyth Jr. and George W. Howard, III and the election of new trustee Albert N. Logan Jr.

Incumbent second-term Democrat Earl L. Langdon was not renominated.

Trustees of the University of Illinois election
| Party | Candidate | Votes | % |
|---|---|---|---|
| Democratic | William D. Forsyth Jr. (incumbent) | 1,865,806 | 22.95 |
| Democratic | Albert N. Logan | 1,775,410 | 21.84 |
| Democratic | George W. Howard, III (incumbent) | 1,739,795 | 21.40 |
| Republican | Jane Hayes Rader | 1,403,554 | 17.26 |
| Republican | Park Livingston | 1,252,356 | 15.40 |
| Republican | Larry Gougler | 1,234,911 | 15.19 |
| Taxpayers | Helen Louise Wells | 209,396 | 2.58 |
| Taxpayers | Robert Joseph Loftus | 133,157 | 1.64 |
| Taxpayers | Phoebe T. Dover | 131,786 | 1.62 |
| Libertarian | Michael Edward Stack | 92,501 | 1.14 |
| Libertarian | Joseph Maxwell | 81,901 | 1.01 |
| Libertarian | Geoffrey S. Nathan | 76,064 | 0.95 |
| Total votes | | 8,130,831 | 100 |

=== Judicial elections ===
Multiple judicial positions were up for election in 1982.

=== Ballot measure ===
Illinois voters voted on a single ballot measure in 1982. In order to be approved, the measures required either 60% support among those specifically voting on the amendment or 50% support among all ballots cast in the elections.

==== Bail Amendment ====
Voters approved the Bail Amendment (also known as "Amendment 1"), a legislatively referred constitutional amendment which amended Article I, Section 9 of the Constitution of Illinois to expand the population that could be denied bail to include those who committed an offense that could result in a life imprisonment sentence.

Bail Amendment
| Option | Votes | % of votes on referendum | % of all ballots cast |
|---|---|---|---|
| Yes | 1,389,796 | 85.31 | 36.03 |
| No | 239,380 | 14.69 | 6.21 |
| Total votes | 1,629,176 | 100 | 42.24 |
| Voter turnout | 27.31% | | |

Amendment results by county Yes: 90–100%; 80–90%; 70–80%

== Local elections ==
Local elections were held.
