= Thomas J. Hanahan =

American carpenter and politician (1934–2009)

Member of the Illinois House of Representatives

Personal details
- Party: Democratic

Thomas J. Hanahan, Jr. (November 10, 1934 – April 3, 2009) was an American carpenter and politician.

Hanahan was born in Chicago, Illinois. He went to the Catholic parochial schools and St. Ignatius High School in Chicago. He took extension courses at University of Illinois. Hanahan served in the United States Navy with the Seabees during the Korean War. Hanahan lived in McHenry, Illinois with his wife and family. He was a carpenter working for Sears, Roebuck and Co. and was involved with the local carpenters labor union serving on the labor union board. Hanahan served in the Illinois House of Representatives from 1965 to 1983 and was a Democrat. In 1975, Hanahan was tried in the United States District Court for extortion, bribery, and mail fraud. He was acquitted for trying to get five thousand dollars from executives in the car rental business. In 2007, Hanahan moved to Prescott, Arizona died at his home in Prescott, Arizona from cancer.
