= R. Bruce Waddell =

American politician

Robert Bruce Waddell (November 27, 1914 – July 31, 1979) was an American politician.

Waddell was born in Dolton, Illinois. He went to study at the Thornton Township High School in Harvey, Illinois, Thornton Community College, and the University of Illinois. During World War II, he served in the United States Military as a medical corpsman and medical administrative officer. He lived with his wife and children in West Dundee, Illinois and was the president of the Taskmaster Equipment Company. A Republican, he served in the Illinois House of Representatives from 1969 until his death in 1979.

Waddell died from a heart attack while cutting wood at Island Lake in Sawyer County, Wisconsin while he was on vacation with his wife in Wisconsin.
