= Illinois Fair Tax =

Failed Illinois state constitution amendment

Fair Tax Amendment, 2020
- Concerns the Adoption of Graduated Income Tax

Results
Choice	Votes	%
Yes	2,683,490	46.73%
No	3,059,411	53.27%
Valid votes	5,742,901	100.00%
Invalid or blank votes	0	0.00%
Total votes	5,742,901	100.00%
County results
Yes
60–70%
50–60%
No
80–90%
70–80%
60–70%
50–60%

The Illinois Fair Tax was a proposed amendment to the Illinois state constitution that would have effectively changed the state income tax system from a flat tax to a graduated income tax. The proposal, formally titled the "Allow for Graduated Income Tax Amendment", appeared on the ballot in the November 3, 2020 election in Illinois as a legislatively referred constitutional amendment striking language from the Constitution of Illinois requiring a flat state income tax. (Note: Constitutional amendments in Illinois must be approved by voters in a referendum.) Concurrent with the proposed constitutional amendment, the Illinois legislature passed legislation setting a new set of graduated income tax rates that would have taken effect had the amendment been approved by voters.

Proponents argued that the proposal would make the Illinois tax code fairer, provide tax relief to most Illinoisans, better fund public goods and social services, and boost small businesses. Opponents argued it would open the door to future tax hikes, hurt businesses, drive businesses and wealthy residents to neighboring states, and place more revenues in the hands of an untrustworthy state government.

The referendum was not approved, receiving about 47% "yes" votes and 53% "no" votes. As a constitutional amendment, the proposal needed to be approved by 60% of those voting on the referendum, or by 50% of all voters voting in the election.

The term "Fair Tax" is used by legislative proponents and advocates of the proposed amendment, who consider a graduated income tax to be more fair than a flat tax. Opponents of the proposal refer to it using other, less favorable terms.

== Context ==
Under current law, Illinois's state income tax rate is a flat rate of 4.95 percent. A flat income tax, which taxes all income levels at the same rate, is required by the current Illinois state constitution. Illinois is one of 11 U.S. states with a flat income tax; seven states have no income tax; 32 other states use graduated income taxes, which tax higher incomes at a higher rate. The last state to switch from a flat state income tax to a graduated state income tax was Connecticut in 1996. The United States federal government, via the Internal Revenue Service, uses a graduated income tax.

== Legislative history ==
=== 2013–14: First attempts to pass graduated income tax in Illinois ===
In 2011, the Illinois government temporarily raised the personal income tax rate from 3% to 5% in order to raise revenues. The rate was set to drop to 3.75% in 2015. In January 2014, the non-partisan business group Civic Federation of Chicago estimated that the prescribed cut in income tax would yield decreased revenues of $1.4 billion in FY15 growing to $2.7 billion in FY16. In its own analysis, the federation projected that the loss of revenue "would dramatically destabilize Illinois' already weak financial condition." They argued that the loss of revenue would be bad for Illinois' businesses, due in part to the fact that the state still owed many private businesses money. Governor Pat Quinn proposed extending the 5 percent flat tax indefinitely, while other groups sought to use a graduated tax to raise revenues.

In 2013, State Rep. Naomi Jakobsson, an Urbana Democrat proposed and advanced HJRCA 33, the initial House legislative vehicle for the proposal. The bill received some criticism for containing no proposed tax rate schedule. The House Revenue Committee rejected Jakobsson's proposal in March 2014.

In 2014, Sen. Don Harmon (D-Oak Park) proposed a Fair Tax amendment along with separate legislation proposing a marginal rate schedule that taxed the first $12,500 of income at 2.9 percent, the range from $12,500 to $180,000 at 4.9 percent, and taxed all income over $180,000 at 6.9 percent. Harmon's proposed constitutional amendment, SJRCA 40, passed the Senate Executive Subcommittee on constitutional amendments. It advanced to the Senate Executive Committee, but failed to make the deadline to clear the Senate, and was withdrawn.

Senator Harmon's proposal was estimated to reduce the tax bill of the Illinois median taxpayer (making $55,317 per year) by $303 per year versus the 5 percent rate. Allowing 2014 law to continue would reduce the median taxpayer's bill by $689 per year, an additional savings of $386 versus the Harmon rates. Other speculative proposals had called for top marginal rates as high as 11 percent, but they were not introduced in the state legislature. Proponents argued that Harmon's rate schedule would provide tax relief to 94% of Illinoisans. Opponents and skeptics contended that was misleading since the current law in 2014 prescribed a decline in the personal income tax rate to 3.75 percent in 2015, after the expiration of a 2011 temporary surtax. They contended Harmon calculated his claimed tax relief from current rates rather than current law at the time.

=== 2019: Passage of a graduated income tax proposal ===
During the 2018 Illinois gubernatorial election, Democratic candidate J. B. Pritzker campaigned in support of a Fair Tax amendment. Pritzker won the election, and Democrats controlled both chambers of the Illinois legislature. On January 28, 2019, Senator Don Harmon introduced a joint resolution that would propose a constitutional amendment allowing the Illinois government to change from a flat tax rate to a graduated rate. The resolution was approved in the Senate by a 36–22 vote on May 1 and by the House by a 73–44 vote on May 27. The resolution received two votes more than the 71 votes needed to pass in the House, in what the Chicago Tribune called a "historic vote". The passage of the resolution placed the proposed amendment on the ballot in the next general election on November 3, 2020. To pass, it requires 60% of the votes on the ballot measure itself, or a simple majority of all of those voting in the election.

Concurrently with the constitutional amendment proposals, legislators debated Senate Bill 687, which laid out the proposed new tax structure which would only have gone into place if voters approved Constitutional Amendment 1. If the amendment had been approved, Senate Bill 687 would have raised taxes on Illinois taxpayers with a taxable income over $250,000. It also included $100 million for property tax relief. This bill passed in the Senate by a 36–22 vote on May 1 and in the House by a 67–48 vote on May 30.

== Proposed changes ==
=== Proposed constitutional amendment ===
The amendment to be voted on in November, 2020, would replace Article IX, Section 3 of the Illinois Constitution with the following language:

Section 3. Limitations on Income Taxation

(a) The General Assembly shall provide by law for the rate or rates of any tax on or measured by income imposed by the State. ~~A tax on or measured by income shall be at a non-graduated rate. At any one time there may be no more than one such tax imposed by the State for State purposes on individuals and one such tax so imposed on corporations.~~ In any such tax imposed upon corporations the highest rate shall not exceed the highest rate imposed on individuals by more than a ratio of 8 to 5.

(b) Laws imposing taxes on or measured by income may adopt by reference provisions of the laws and regulations of the United States, as they then exist or thereafter may be changed, for the purpose of arriving at the amount of income upon which the tax is imposed.

=== Ballot referendum language ===
The official ballot language of the question is as follows:

The proposed amendment grants the State authority to impose higher income tax rates on higher income levels, which is how the federal government and a majority of other states do it. The amendment would remove the portion of the Revenue Article of the Illinois Constitution that is sometimes referred to as the “flat tax,” that requires all taxes on income to be at the same rate. The amendment does not itself change tax rates. It gives the State the ability to impose higher tax rates on those with higher income levels and lower tax rates on those with middle or lower income levels. You are asked to decide whether the proposed amendment should become a part of the Illinois Constitution.

=== Proposed rate changes ===
The constitutional amendment itself would have removed the requirement that income be taxed at a flat rate. The state government would then have been allowed to change income tax rates through the normal legislative process. The Illinois legislature proposed a new set of income tax rates in Senate Bill 687, which was enacted shortly after the constitutional amendment was approved to be placed on the ballot. This legislation would have taken effect on January 1, 2021, if voters had approved the constitutional amendment in the November 2020 election.

==== Personal income tax ====
The table below shows the new tax rates on personal income proposed in Senate Bill 687. Those with a taxable income of $250,000 or less would have retained the same marginal tax rate or see their rate lowered. Rates would have increased for those making over $250,000, with the specific rate varying depending on whether a taxpayer is filing alone or jointly. Single filers with a taxable income over $750,000 and joint filers with a taxable income over $1 million would have paid the maximum rate of 7.95% on their net income, rather than paying marginal tax rates for each tier of income.

Proposed changes to personal income tax rates in SB 687
Taxable income (for single filers)	Marginal tax rate in 2019	Proposed marginal tax rate (for single filers)	Proposed marginal tax rate (for joint filers)
$0 – $10,000	4.95%	4.75%	4.75%
$10,001 – $100,000	4.95%	4.90%	4.90%
$100,001 – $250,000	4.95%	4.95%	4.95%
$250,001 – $350,000	4.95%	7.75%	7.75%
$350,001 – $500,000	4.95%	7.85%	7.75%
$500,001 – $750,000	4.95%	7.85%	7.85%
$750,001 – $1,000,000	4.95%	7.95% on net income	7.85%
$1,000,001 and above	4.95%	7.95% on net income	7.95% on net income

==== Corporate tax and other taxes ====
The proposed constitutional amendment included a requirement that corporate tax rates must not exceed the highest income tax rate by a ratio of 8 to 5. The new tax rates proposed by the state legislature in SB 687 included an increase in corporate income taxes from 7% to 7.99%. SB 687 would have also changed the state's property tax credit, which is a credit that some residents paying property taxes can claim to reduce their income taxes, from 5% to 6%. (Note: The property tax credit allows individuals or households with an Adjusted Gross Income (AGI) of $500,000 to receive a credit on their income taxes. Currently, this credit is 5% of property taxes paid. SB 687 would raise this amount to 6% of property taxes paid.) It would also have created a per-child tax credit of up to $100 for couples earning less than $100,000 and single persons earning less than $80,000. The new tax rates would not have included any taxation of retirement income.

== 2020 statewide vote ==
=== Support and opposition ===
Three 501(c)(4) organizations formed to support the Fair Tax amendment. Vote Yes For Fairness was formed by Quentin Fulks, who is also the head of Think Big Illinois and was a staffer on Pritzker's 2018 gubernatorial campaign. Governor Pritzker donated $56.5 million of his personal wealth to Vote Yes For Fairness. Vote Yes for Fair Tax was headed by John Bouman, president of the Shriver Center on Poverty Law, and received donations from a number of labor unions and community organizations. A third organization, Yes to a Financially Response Illinois, was funded and organized by the AARP.

Two organizations formed to campaign against the Fair Tax amendment. Greg Baise, former president of the Illinois Manufacturers’ Association, formed the Vote No on Blank Check Amendment Committee to oppose the Illinois Fair Tax. A second organization opposed to the amendment, Coalition To Stop The Proposed Tax Hike Amendment, received $20 million from hedge fund manager and Illinois' wealthiest resident Kenneth C. Griffin. In October 2020, multi-Billionaire Ken Griffin donated a second time, adding $26.75 million more to the campaign to stop the Fair Tax for a total of $46.75 million donated.

==== Endorsements ====
For

Officeholders

- Christopher Belt, Illinois state senator
- Don Harmon, president of the Illinois Senate
- Michael Madigan, speaker of the Illinois House of Representatives
- Robert Martwick, Illinois state representative
- J. B. Pritzker, governor of Illinois
- Dick Durbin, US senator for Illinois
- Susana Mendoza, Comptroller of Illinois
- David Harris, former IL state representative (Republican)

Newspapers

- Chicago Sun-Times
- St. Louis Post-Dispatch
- Southern Illinoisan
- The New York Times

Community and advocacy organizations

- AARP
- Access Living
- Act for Children
- Action for a Better Tomorrow
- Active Transportation Alliance
- AIDS Foundation of Chicago
- Allendale Association
- American Association of University Women Illinois
- Arab American Family Services
- Asian American Midwest Progressives
- Asian Americans Advancing Justice-Chicago
- Black Women Organizing for Power-BWOP Chicago
- Brighton Park Neighborhood Council
- Center for Housing and Health
- Champaign County Health Care Consumers
- Change Peoria
- Chicago Alliance Against Sexual Exploitation
- Chicago Area Peace Action
- Chicago Coalition for the Homeless
- Chicago Jobs Council
- Chicago Jobs with Justice Action Board
- Chicago Votes
- Chicago Women Take Action
- Citizen Action/IL
- CommUNITY Diversity Group of La Grange
- Community Organizing and Family Issues (COFI)
- Community Renewal Society
- Economic Security for Illinois
- Enlace Chicago
- Erie Neighborhood House
- Equality Illinois
- FIKA Naperville
- Grassroots Collaborative
- Grassroots Illinois Action
- GSU Chapter of State Universities Annuitant Association
- HANA Center
- Healthy Illinois
- Heartland Alliance
- Housing Action Illinois
- Illinois Alliance for Retired Americans
- Illinois Association of Rehabilitation Facilities
- Illinois Birth Justice
- Illinois Coalition Against Domestic Violence
- Illinois Coalition for Immigrant and Refugee Rights
- Illinois Collaboration on Youth
- Illinois Economic Policy Institute
- Illinois Families for Public Schools
- Illinois Partners for Human Service
- Illinois Primary Health Care Association
- Indivisible Illinois
- Indivisible Chicago Alliance
- Indivisible Chicago – Lincoln Square
- Indivisible Chicago – South Side
- Indivisible South Suburban Chicago
- Inner-City Muslim Action Network
- Jane Addams Senior Caucus
- Jewish Council on Urban Affairs
- Latino Policy Forum
- League of Women Voters of Illinois
- League of Women Voters of Glenview/Glencoe
- League of Women Voters Homewood-Flossmoor Area
- League of Women Voters LaGrange Area
- League of Women Voters of Lake County
- League of Women Voters of Central Kane County
- League of Women Voters of Chicago
- League of Women Voters of Evanston
- League of Women Voters of Glen Ellyn
- League of Women Voters of Greater Rockford
- League of Women Voters of Lake County
- League of Women Voters of McLean County
- League of Women Voters of Oak Park and River Forest
- League of Women Voters of Roselle-Bloomingdale
- League of Women Voters of the Edwardsville Area
- Legal Council for Health Justice
- Live Free Chicago
- Logan Square Neighborhood Association
- Mujeres Latinas en Acción
- National Alliance on Mental Illness of Illinois (NAMI Illinois)
- Northern Illinois Jobs With Justice
- Omidyar Network
- ONE Northside
- ONE People's Campaign
- Parents Organized to Win, Educate, and Review-Policy Action Council, IL (POWER-PAC IL)
- Partnership for College Completion
- Peoria People's Project
- Peoria Chapter of the NAACP
- Personal PAC
- Planned Parenthood Illinois Action
- Pride Action Tank
- Saint Anthony Hospital
- She Votes Illinois
- Shriver Center on Poverty Law
- Sierra Club Illinois
- Supportive Housing Providers Association of Illinois
- Teach Plus Illinois
- The People's Lobby
- Think Big Illinois
- Thresholds
- United Nations Association of Chicago
- United Working Families
- Women Employed
- Women's March Rockford
- Workers Center for Racial Justice
- Young Invincibles
- YWCA McLean County

Labor unions

- AFSCME Council 31
- AFSCME Retirees Chapter 31
- Amalgamated Transit Union Local 241
- Amalgamated Transit Union Local 308
- American Federation of Government Employees, District 7
- APWU Local 0001
- Argo Teachers Council
- Associated Firefighters of Illinois
- Bricklayers Administrative District Council 1 of Illinois
- Chicago Federation of Labor
- Chicago Laborers’ District Council
- Chicago Teachers Union
- Cook County College Teachers Union, Local 1600
- East Central Illinois Building & Construction Trades Council
- Elgin Community College Faculty Association, IFT Local 3791
- Federation of College Clerical and Technical Personnel, IFT Local 1708
- Heat & Frost Insulators Local 1
- Heat & Frost Insulators Local 17
- Heat & Frost Insulators Local 18
- IAMAW Mechanics' Local 701
- IBEW Local 134
- Illinois AFL–CIO
- Illinois Education Association
- Illinois Federation of Teachers
- IUOE Local 399
- International Association of Machinists Local 126
- Laborers’ International Union of North America – Midwest Region
- Limestone Federation of Teachers
- McHenry County Federation of Teachers
- Moraine Valley Faculty Association
- NALC Branch 11
- North Central Illinois Labor Council
- North Suburban Teachers Union
- Painters' District Council 14
- Plumbers Local 130 UA
- SEIU Healthcare Illinois
- SEIU Local 1
- SEIU Local 73
- Service Employees International Union (SEIU) Illinois State C ouncil
- Sheet Metal Workers' Local 73
- Southwestern Illinois Central Labor Council
- Springfield and Central Illinois Trades and Labor Council
- Student IEA
- Teamsters Joint Council 25
- Triton College Faculty Association (TCFA), Local 1600
- UAW Local 1268
- UAW Region 4
- UFCW Local 881
- UFCW Local 1546
- UNITE HERE Local 1
- University Professionals of Illinois Local 4100
- West Central Illinois Labor Council
- Western Trades and Labor Assembly

Faith organizations

- Faith Coalition for the Common Good
- Good Shepherd of Faith UCC
- Mt. Carmel Missionary Baptist Church
- Social Justice Committee of Unitarian Universalist Society of Geneva
- Tzedek Chicago
- Unitarian Universalist Advocacy Network of Illinois
- United Church of Christ: CMA Justice & Witness Team
- United Congregations of Metro East
Against

Officeholders

- Greg Baise, former director of the Illinois Department of Transportation and former head of Illinois Manufacturers' Association
- Bill Brady, minority leader of the Illinois Senate
- Jim Durkin, minority leader of the Illinois House of Representatives
- Margo McDermed, Illinois state representative
- David McSweeney, Illinois state representative
- Lindsay Parkhurst, Illinois state representative
- Steven Reick, Illinois state representative
- Dale Righter, Illinois state senator
- Tim Schneider, Illinois Republican Party Chairman and former member of the Cook County Board of Commissioners
- Paul Schimpf, Illinois state senator

Individuals

- Kenneth C. Griffin, hedge fund manager

Newspapers

- Chicago Tribune
- Quad-City Times
- Shaw Media Local News Network

Organizations

- Civic Federation
- Ideas Illinois
- Illinois Chamber of Commerce
- Illinois Farm Bureau
- Illinois Opportunity Project
- National Federation of Independent Business Federal Political Action Committee
- Technology and Manufacturing Association

=== Arguments ===
Proponents argue that a tax structure which includes lower rates for lower-income residents and higher marginal rates for higher-income residents would be fairer. They point out that when income taxes are considered alongside other state and local taxes such as sales taxes, lower-income residents pay a higher share of their income as taxes than higher-income residents. Many proponents, including the organizations formed to advocate for the passage of the proposal, have emphasized that 97% of Illinois families would not see an increase in income taxes, since the new rates passed by the legislature accompanying the ballot referendum only raise taxes for those making over $250,000.

Labor unions, activist groups, and Democratic Party politicians have pointed to estimates that the new tax rates would increase state revenues by $3.4 billion annually while reducing the burden on lower-income families, arguing that increased revenues could be used to fund schools, healthcare, and public safety. In endorsing the Fair Tax proposal, a coalition of 125 labor unions in the state argued that it would reduce economic inequality and would enable increased funding for public education and healthcare. Some proponents have also argued that the increased state revenues would help create jobs, prevent the trend of working families leaving the state, and support small businesses by giving customers more purchasing power. During the COVID-19 pandemic, the Chicago Sun-Times editorial board argued that the best way to thank essential workers and service sector workers during the pandemic would be to pass the Fair Tax, arguing that an extra dollar is more valuable to these workers than it is for the rich.

Opponents of the proposal, including several business associations, argue that it would hurt businesses in the state. The Illinois Chamber of Commerce argued the new tax system would hurt business and push wealthier earners out of the state.

Opponents have also argued that the state government cannot be trusted to appropriately spend the additional funds that would be raised, and that the proposal gives lawmakers a "blank check." For example, the organization Vote No Blank Check have pointed to the corruption scandal surrounding Commonwealth Edison and Illinois House Speaker Michael Madigan in their campaign against the ballot referendum. The Illinois Policy Institute, a libertarian think tank, points to the amendment's removal of the provision that the state may only impose one tax on income and argues that legislators will be able to impose additional or special taxes on top of the regular income tax.

=== Polls ===
Poll source	Date(s) administered	Sample size (Note: Key: A – all adults RV – registered voters LV – likely voters V – unclear)	Margin of error	Support	Oppose	Undecided
Paul Simon Public Policy Institute	February 10–17, 2020	1,000 (RV)	± 3.1%	65%	32%	3%
University of Illinois Springfield; Survey Research Office	September 13–23, 2019	1,012 (RV)	± 3.5%	67%	33%	—N/a
Ideas Illinois/We Ask America (Note: Ideas Illinois is an opponent of the graduated income tax proposal and commissioned the poll as part of its inquiry into the effectiveness of its campaigning against the proposal.)	May 29–30, 2019	800 (LV)	± 3.5%	51%	33%	—N/a
Paul Simon Public Policy Institute	March 11–17, 2019	1,000 (RV)	± 3.1%	67%	31%	2%

=== Election results ===
The proposed amendment was on the ballot during the November 3, 2020 election in Illinois as a legislatively referred constitutional amendment. In order to be approved, the measure needed to receive either 60% support among those specifically voting on the amendment or support from 50% of all ballots cast in the state's November elections.

The referendum did not pass, as it failed to meet either threshold. The "no" votes outnumbered the "yes" votes by 53.27 to 46.73%.

Allow for Graduated Income Tax Amendment
Option	Votes	% of votes on measure	% of all ballots cast
For	2,683,490	46.73	44.00
Against	3,059,411	53.27	50.17
Total votes	5,742,901	100	94.17
Voter turnout	68.66%		
