= Tom Walsh (Illinois politician) =

American politician

Thomas P. Walsh was a Democratic member of the Illinois House of Representatives from 1991-1993.

== Biography ==
Walsh was born April 16, 1937 in Ottawa, Illinois. He attended LaSalle-Peru-Oglesby Junior College and the Worsham College of Mortuary Science. He served in the United States Army Reserve from 1960 to 1965. In 1972, Walsh was elected the county clerk for LaSalle County, Illinois. After Peg McDonnell Breslin chose to run for Illinois Treasurer, Walsh was elected to succeed her as the state representative from the 75th district. He served as a full-time legislator and was assigned to the Committees on Aging; Economic and Urban Development; Elementary and Secondary Education; Environment and Energy; Health Care; and Municipal and Conservation Law. In the 1991 decennial reapportionment, the Republicans gerrymandered Walsh with recently appointed Democratic colleague Frank Mautino into the 76th district. In the 1992 Democratic primary, Mautino prevailed over Walsh.
