= Illinois Governor Recall Amendment =

Illinois Governor Recall Amendment, 2010
- Concerns the Adoption of Gubernatorial Recall Elections

Results
Choice	Votes	%
Yes	1,639,158	65.93%
No	846,966	34.07%
Valid votes	2,486,124	100.00%
Invalid or blank votes	0	0.00%
Total votes	2,486,124	100.00%
Yes
60–70%
50–60%
No
50–60%

On November 2, 2010, Illinois voters approved the Illinois Governor Recall Amendment, a legislatively referred constitutional amendment to the Constitution of Illinois. The amendment changed the state constitution to allow recall elections of Illinois governors.

== Background ==
Illinois had seen four of the eight governors that preceded the incumbent governor, Pat Quinn, be convicted of felonies. The movement to adopt the amendment also was riding the recent public sentiment following the scandals related to former governor Rod Blagojevich, who was removed from office by impeachment.

== Passage in the state legislature ==
It was required that, in order to qualify for the ballot, the measure be approved by 60% approval of both the Illinois House of Representatives and the Illinois Senate.

The amendment had been proposed by state representative Jack D. Franks and state senator Daniel Cronin. Michael Noland was the one to formally introduce it when it came before the Illinois Senate.

== Changes to the state constitution ==
Effective December 3, 2010, per the amendment, Article III of the Illinois Constitution was amended with the addition of the new section, section 7, which read,

Initiative to Recall Governor

(a) The recall of the Governor may be proposed by a petition signed by a number of electors equal in number to at least 15% of the total votes cast for Governor in the preceding gubernatorial election, with at least 100 signatures from each of at least 25 separate counties. A petition shall have been signed by the petitioning electors not more than 150 days after an affidavit has been filed with the State Board of Elections providing notice of intent to circulate a petition to recall the Governor. The affidavit may be filed no sooner than 6 months after the beginning of the Governor's term of office. The affidavit shall have been signed by the proponent of the recall petition, at least 20 members of the House of Representatives, and at least 10 members of the Senate, with no more than half of the signatures of members of each chamber from the same established political party.

(b) The form of the petition, circulation, and procedure for determining the validity and sufficiency of a petition shall be as provided by law. If the petition is valid and sufficient, the State Board of Elections shall certify the petition not more than 100 days after the date the petition was filed, and the question "Shall (name) be recalled from the office of Governor?" must be submitted to the electors at a special election called by the State Board of Elections, to occur not more than 100 days after certification of the petition. A recall petition certified by the State Board of Elections may not be withdrawn and another recall petition may not be initiated against the Governor during the remainder of the current term of office. Any recall petition or recall election pending on the date of the next general election at which a candidate for Governor is elected is moot.

(c) If a petition to recall the Governor has been filed with the State Board of Elections, a person eligible to serve as Governor may propose his or her candidacy by a petition signed by a number of electors equal in number to the requirement for petitions for an established party candidate for the office of Governor, signed by petitioning electors not more than 50 days after a recall petition has been filed with the State Board of Elections. The form of a successor election petition, circulation, and procedure for determining the validity and sufficiency of a petition shall be as provided by law. If the successor election petition is valid and sufficient, the State Board of Elections shall certify the petition not more than 100 days after the date the petition to recall the Governor was filed. Names of candidates for nomination to serve as the candidate of an established political party must be submitted to the electors at a special primary election, if necessary, called by the State Board of Elections to be held at the same time as the special election on the question of recall established under subsection (b). Names of candidates for the successor election must be submitted to the electors at a special successor election called by the State Board of Elections, to occur not more than 60 days after the date of the special primary election or on a date established by law.

(d) The Governor is immediately removed upon certification of the recall election results if a majority of the electors voting on the question vote to recall the Governor. If the Governor is removed, then (i) an Acting Governor determined under subsection (a) of Section 6 of Article V shall serve until the Governor elected at the special successor election is qualified and (ii) the candidate who receives the highest number of votes in the special successor election is elected Governor for the balance of the term.

== Referendum ==
The amendment was referred to the voters in a referendum during the general election of 2010 Illinois elections on November 2, 2012.

=== Ballot language ===
The ballot question read,

The proposed amendment, which takes effect upon approval by the voters, adds a new section to the Suffrage and Elections Article of the Illinois Constitution. The new section would provide the State's electors with an option to petition for a special election to recall a Governor and for the special election of a successor Governor. At the general election to be held on November 2, 2010, you will be called upon to decide whether the proposed amendment should become part of the Illinois Constitution. If you believe the Illinois Constitution should be amended "YES" on the question. If you believe the Illinois Constitution to provide for a special election to recall a Governor and for a special election to elect a successor Governor, you should vote should not be amended successor Governor, you should vote "NO" on the question. Three-fifths of those voting on the question or a majority of those voting in the election must vote "YES" in order for the to provide for a special election to recall a Governor and for a special election to elect an amendment to become effective.

=== Arguments ===
Proponents argued that it empowered citizens, and was justified by corruption in the state.

Some opponents argued that recall elections are costly. Others argued that the signature barriers were too high. Others also criticized it as not allowing true citizen-initiated recall, with the Illinois Policy Institute deriding it as "permission slip democracy" for the requirement of getting an affidavit signed by "at least 20 members of the House of Representatives, and at least 10 members of the Senate, with no more than half of the signatures of members of each chamber coming from members of the same established political party."

The American Civil Liberties Union argued that the measure could lead to expensive litigation.

=== Endorsements ===
Yes

Officeholders

- Bill Brady, Illinois state senator and Republican nominee for governor of Illinois
- Daniel Cronin, Illinois state senator
- Jack D. Franks, Illinois state representative
- Frank Mautino, Illinois state representative
- Michael Noland, Illinois state senator
- Pat Quinn, governor of Illinois

Newspapers

- Daily Herald
- The Pantagraph
- Chicago Tribune
No

Organizations

- American Civil Liberties Union
- Illinois Policy Institute

Newspapers

- Belleville News-Democrat
- Chicago Sun-Times
- Rockford Register Star
- St. Louis Post-Dispatch
- The State Journal-Register

=== Result ===
In order to be approved, the measure required either 60% support among those specifically voting on the amendment or 50% support among all ballots cast in the elections. The 60% support threshold was exceeded.

Illinois Governor Recall Amendment
Option	Votes	% of votes on measure	% of all ballots cast
For	1,639,158	65.90	43.36
Against	846,966	34.10	22.40
Total votes	2,486,124	100	65.76
Voter turnout	33.12%		
