= Greg Baise =

American politician (born 1952)

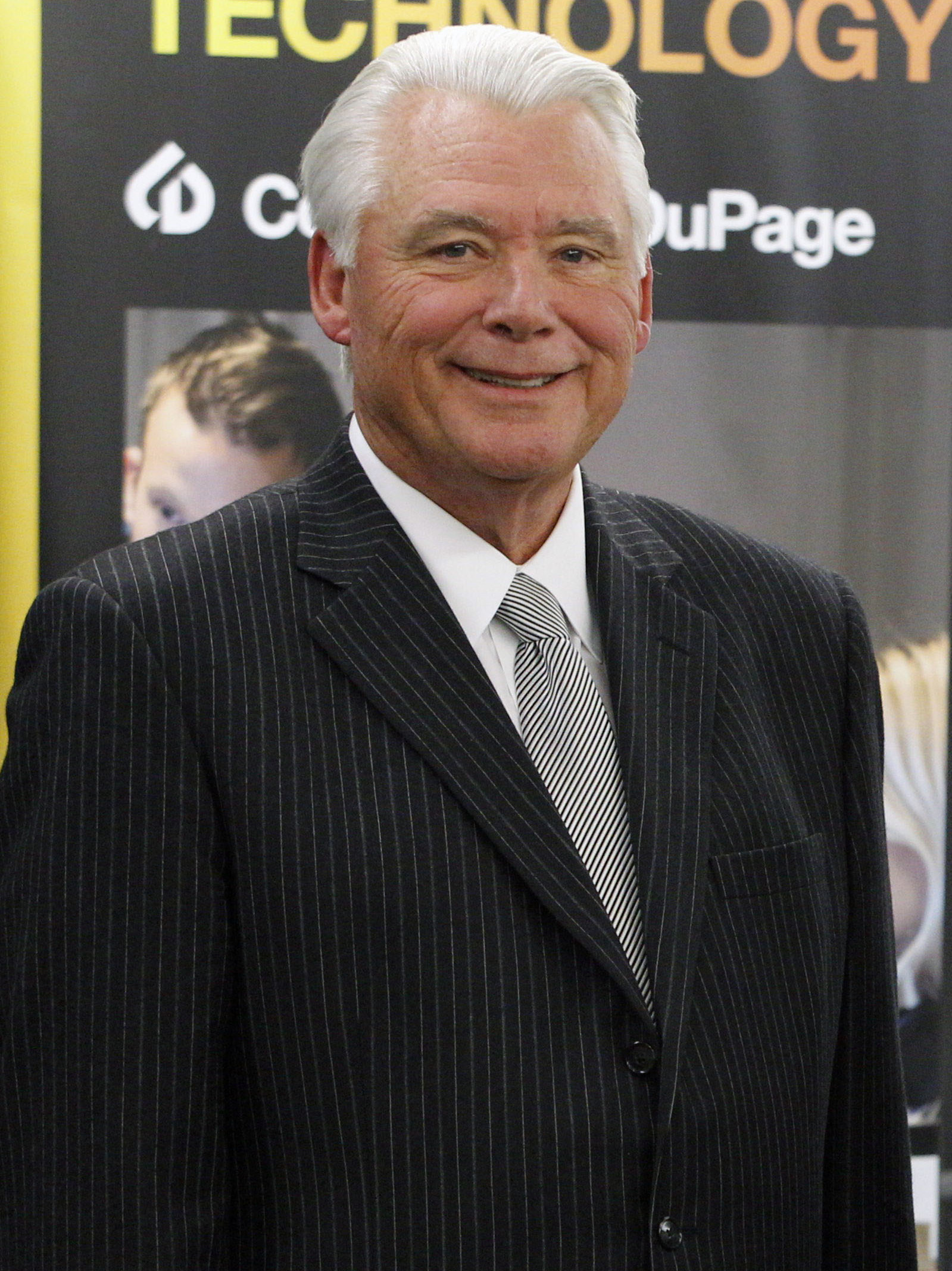
- Baise in 2017

Illinois Secretary of Transportation
- In office November 1984 – November 1989
- Governor: Jim Thompson
- Preceded by: John D. Kramer
- Succeeded by: Kirk Brown

Jacksonville, Illinois, alderman
- In office 1975–1978

Personal details
- Born: April 13, 1952 (age 74) Jacksonville, Illinois
- Party: Republican
- Spouse: Tonya
- Children: 2

Gregory W. Baise (born April 13, 1952) is an American politician who served as the president and CEO of the Illinois Manufacturers' Association from 1991 until 2019. Before that, he had worked in several political and government roles, including leading IDOT as Illinois secretary of transportation under governor Jim Thompson in the 1980s. Baise is a Republican, and in 1990 was his party's unsuccessful nominee for Illinois treasurer. In recent decades, he has been involved in a number of political action committees (PACs).

== Early life and education ==
Baise was born April 13, 1952, in Jacksonville, Illinois. He grew up on a farm nearby. He graduated from Triopia High School in 1970, and went on to attend Illinois College in Jacksonville. He graduated from Illinois College in 1974.

== Early career ==
Baise spent his final two summers of college as an intern at the United States House of Representatives at the time of the Watergate hearings. After graduating from college, Baise was elected an alderman (city councilor) in Jacksonville. He served as alderman from 1975 through 1978. His employment outside of his elected office was in the admission's department of Illinois College.

During the 1976 Illinois gubernatorial election, Baise volunteered for the campaign of Jim Thompson. This began a fourteen-year period in which he would hold various roles as a staffer for Thompson. After Thompson's victory, Baise was hired to serve as a travel aide to Governor Thompson. In 1979, he became Thompson's scheduler, heading the governor's scheduling office. Effective January 5, 1981, he became Thompson's personnel director, a role in which he oversaw the governor's patronage appointments. At the same time that he became the personnel director, he also was named an assistant to Arthur Quern, the director of government operations. Baise was the campaign manager of Thompson's 1986 reelection campaign, and during the 1984 United States presidential election managed the Illinois operations of Ronald Reagan's presidential reelection campaign.

== Illinois Secretary of Transportation ==
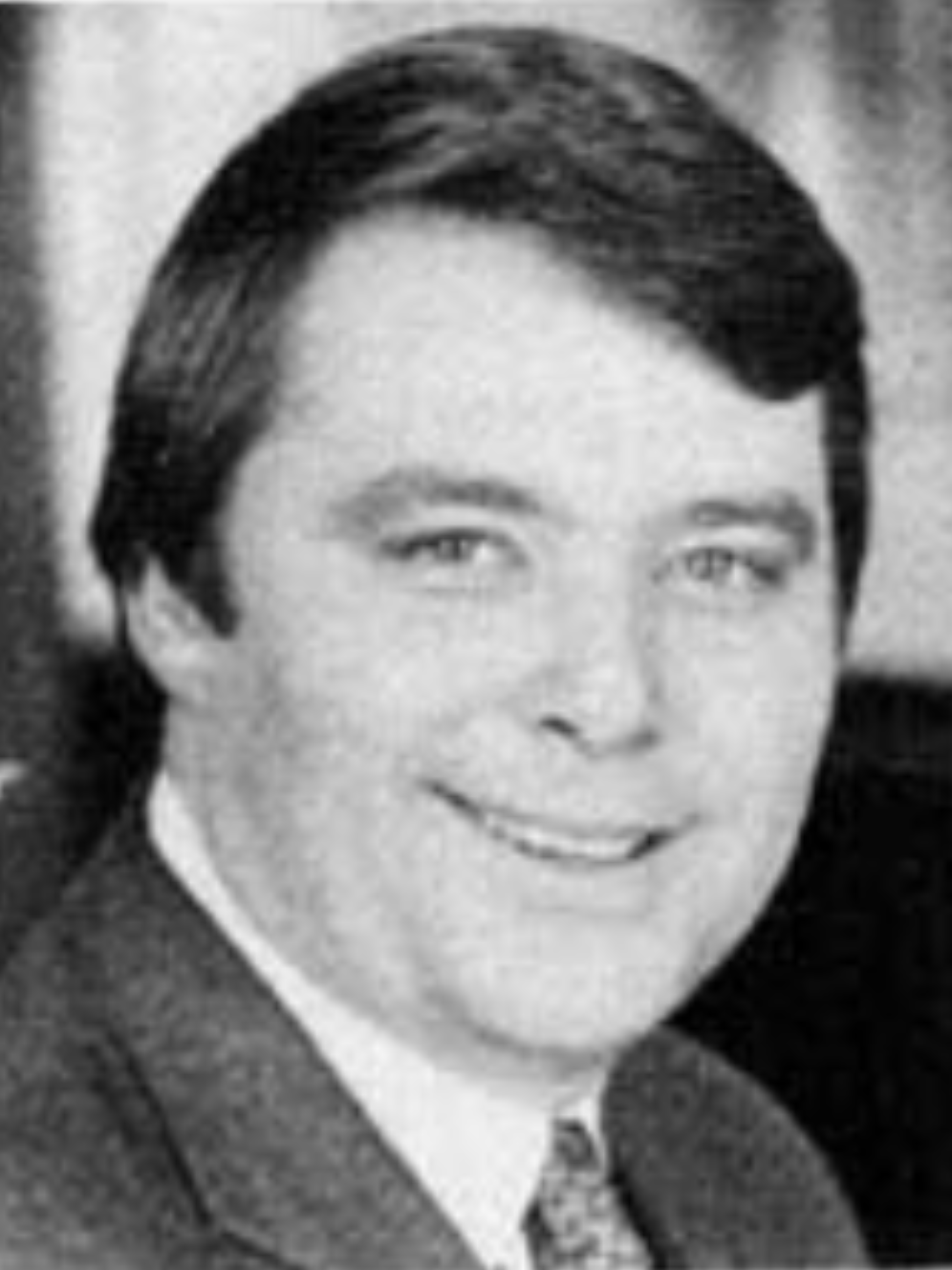
Baise, circa 1985

In November 1984, Baise was appointed by Thompson as Illinois Secretary of Transportation, making him the director of the Illinois Department of Transportation (IDOT).

Under Baise, an emergency number *999 was created as the Cellular Express Line to be used by expressway motorists with mobile phones (then on the rise) in the Chicago-area. Baise announced the program in August 1989. In November 1989, Baise told local officials that IDOT had decided that it would only complete a portion of the planned route of Illinois Route 390. During his tenure, work was completed by IDOT to upgrade U.S. Route 51 in Illinois. In 1989, Baise was, appointed to also serve as the chairman of the Governor's Earthquake Preparedness Task Force.

During the 1988 United States presidential election, Baise served as an advisor to George H. W. Bush's campaign operations in Illinois, and ran its Southern Illinois operations.

=== Plans for a new Chicago airport ===
Baise was involved in the Chicago Airport Capacity Study in partnership with the state's of Wisconsin and Indiana. The study concluded that a new airport would need to be constructed by the year 2000, and should be located in the southern part of the region. The study and its conclusions drew criticism for its cost projections and passenger projections, among other critiques. The technical committee of the study, which consisted of the planning departments of the three states, had departed from the full committee, with its own conclusions arguing that the region's existing airports could sufficiently meet demand in the foreseeable future. Despite the technical committee's continlusion, the policy committee of the study led by Baise along with Aldo DeAngelis and Lieutenant Governor of Illinois George Ryan continued ahead with studying options for an additional airport. Baise continued serving as chairman of the Third Airport Policy Committee as plans continued.

In 1989, the Illinois-Indiana Regional Airport Study was formed, and its commission studied four potential sites, including Gary Airport, a site along the Illinois-Indiana border, Peotone, Illinois, and Kankakee, Illinois. This study also, at the urging of newly elected Chicago mayor Richard M. Daley, added the proposed Lake Calumet airport to their study. After Wisconsin got its demand of having Milwaukee Mitchell International Airport named as Chicago's "supplemental" airport, the state withdrew from its participation in the study, leaving just Illinois and Indiana.

== 1990 Illinois Treasurer campaign ==
November 16, 1989, Baise resigned as Secretary of Transportation in order to focus on his campaign running for Illinois treasurer in 1990.

Baise won the Republican nomination, but lost general election to Democrat Pat Quinn He campaigned on a message of conservatism. His opponent, Quinn, campaigned as a populist reformer in opposition to big government. his campaign adopted a tactic of painting Quinn as a longtime anti-establishment demagogue. His campaign also criticized Quinn for his failed 1986 treasurer campaign and for having considered runs for various other offices before opting to run again for treasurer. His campaign also painted Quinn as having had few accomplishments. He criticized Quinn's plan to close what Quinn had called a "tax loophole". Quinn had lobbied for the state to impose a sales tax on farm machinery.

One of Baise's campaign proposals was to establish a "College Savings Plan" to enable the treasurer's office to help students and families afford the cost of higher education. He also promised to modernize the office through technology. This included establishing electronic transfers of funds. He additionally promised to expand the Illinois Public Treasurers’ Investment Pool through collaboration with municipal governments and local treasurers. He also pledged that he would request the Illinois General Assembly establish an advisory board to give him recommendations on where he should invest state money. During his campaign, there was an incident in which his two-engine plane lost power and landed in a wheat field near Pontiac, Illinois. There were no injuries incurred in this incident. During the campaign, Quinn accused Baise of improper conduct by accepting a loan from a road contractor while serving as Illinois Secretary of Transportation. Baise ultimately lost to Quinn by an 11.4 point margin. Of all the major-party nominees for Illinois statewide offices in 1990, Baise received the fewest votes, the greatest margin of defeat, and the lowest percentage of the vote in his race.

== Leadership of the Illinois Manufacturer's Association ==
On March 1, 1991, Baise succeeded Arthur R. Gottschalk as president of the Illinois Manufacturers' Association (IMA). He later also became CEO.

As head of the organization, Baise quickly involved himself in lobbying business issues, including regulatory reforms such as the deregulation of electrical utilities and efforts to alter workers' compensation laws. He was credited with overseeing a revitalization of the IMA's education foundation. During his tenure, IMA was involved with successfully pushing for the repeal of the Illinois Structural Work Act, the institution of the Manufacturer's Purchase Credit, the passage of significant reforms to workers' compensation and unemployment insurance, major reforms to tort law and education policies, and the passage of landmark hydraulic fracturing legislation. In 2004, Baise founded Xpress Professional Services, a for-profit subsidiary of IMA. Xpress Professional Services is a political fulfillment firm which delivers such services as direct mail, radio, and television production and placement for candidates. The firm would also, in 2006, establish a polling service named We Ask America.

In 2018, Baise announced that he would retire as president and CEO of the Illinois Manufacturers' Association effective January 1, 2019. He also announced that he would continue to head the organizations' subsidiary for-profit political strategy and marketing firm Xpress Professional Services.

== Political action committee involvement ==
Baise has been involved with a number of political action committees (PACs). During his tenure as head of the Illinois Manufacturers' Association, had its own political action committee called Manufacturers PAC, also known as MPAC. In 2004, Baise, became the lead co-founder of the Illinois Coalition for Jobs, a 501(c) organization. In 2008, he and Ronald Gidwitz formed the Economic Freedom Alliance, a 527 organization, to oppose the passage of the Employee Free Choice Act. Baise has served as treasurer of New Prosperity Foundation political action committee since it was founded during the 2010 election cycle. Baise serves as chairman of Ideas Illinois PAC. In 2019, he founded the Vote No on Blank Check Amendment Committee to oppose the Illinois Fair Tax. He served as head of the committee.

== Personal life ==
Baise and his wife, Tonya, have two children.

At various points of his life Baise has lived in different places in Illinois, including Chicago, Jacksonville, Lemont, Oak Brook, Springfield, and Willowbrook.

== Electoral history ==
=== Illinois State Treasurer ===
1990 Illinois Treasurer Republican primary
Party	Candidate	Votes	%
Republican	Greg Baise	594,238	100
Total votes		594,238	100

1990 Illinois Treasurer election
Party	Candidate	Votes	%
Democratic	Patrick Quinn	1,740,742	55.7
Republican	Greg Baise	1,384,492	44.3
Write-in	Paul Salander	55	0.0
Total votes		3,125,289	100

Party political offices
Preceded by J. Michael Houston	Republican nominee for Illinois Treasurer; 1990	Succeeded by Judy Baar Topinka
