= Peg McDonnell Breslin =

American politician

Member of the Illinois House of Representatives
- In office January 1977 – January 1991
- Preceded by: James Riccolo
- Succeeded by: Tom Walsh
- Constituency: 38th district (1977–1983); 75th district (1983–1991)

Personal details
- Born: Peg McDonnell; July 11, 1946 (age 80) Ottawa, Illinois
- Party: Democratic
- Spouse: John Breslin
- Children: Two
- Education: Loyola University (BA, JD)
- Profession: Attorney; Judge

Peg McDonnell Breslin (born July 11, 1946) is an American politician who served as a Democratic member of the Illinois House of Representatives from 1977 until 1991.

== Biography ==
Breslin was born July 11, 1946, in Ottawa, Illinois. After graduating from a Catholic high school in the Ottawa area, Breslin moved to Chicago to attend Loyola University. In 1967, she graduated from Loyola with a Bachelor of Arts in political science. Three years later, she graduated from Loyola University School of Law and went into private practice. She was a legal advisor to the Illinois State Board of Education from 1974 to 1976.

In 1976, she was elected to the Illinois House of Representatives as one of three members from the 38th district. Democratic incumbent James Riccolo, appointed to fill the vacancy created by Joseph Fennessey's resignation, finished fourth. At that time, the 38th encompassed all of Livingston County parts of DeKalb, Kane, Kendall and LaSalle counties. As Breslin had voted in Chicago while a Loyola student, she did not meet the constitutionally mandated two-year residency requirement to serve as an Illinois State Representative. She was removed from the Illinois House by a 91–74 vote. The next day, the Democratic chairmen of the five county parties in the 38th district appointed Breslin to the seat from which she had been removed. A group of legislators led by Edward Bluthardt raised the residency question in a lawsuit. The judge ruled the House action ousting her was legal and that her reappointment by the county chairmen was unconstitutional. On appeal, the Illinois Supreme Court declared the issue moot as the 80th General Assembly had ended.

After the passage of the Cutback Amendment, Breslin was reelected to the House from the 75th district, which included all of Lasalle and Putnam counties, southeastern Bureau County, and a small portion of eastern Marshall County. She rose through the ranks of the Democratic Party serving as both an Assistant Democratic Leader in the house and the Committeewoman for Illinois's 14th congressional district on the central committee of the Democratic Party of Illinois.

In 1990, she ran for the Democratic nomination for Illinois Treasurer against future Governor Pat Quinn. Quinn, who had name recognition from his political activism including the Cutback Amendment and Citizens Utility Board, defeated Breslin with 450,217 to her 422,295. She was succeeded in the House by LaSalle County Clerk Tom Walsh.

In 1992, she became the first woman elected an Illinois Appellate Court outside of Cook County when she was elected in the Third District. It was speculated that she would be the Democratic candidate for a seat on the Illinois Supreme Court in the 2000 election, but she chose not to run. Democratic candidate Thomas Kilbride defeated Republican Carl Hawkinson for the seat. Judge Breslin chose to retire rather than run for retention in 2002. On January 23, 2006, her son John died at age 22.
