= 1990 Illinois elections =

- November 6, 1990
- Turnout: 56.71%

Elections were held in Illinois on Tuesday, November 6, 1990. The primary elections were held on March 20, 1990.

All statewide offices saw their incumbents forgo seeking reelection. However, no statewide office saw a change in party composition, with Republicans retaining the governorship and lieutenant governorship in their joint election, as well as the office of Secretary of State, and Democrats retaining the offices of Attorney General, Comptroller, and Treasurer.

Democrats retained their control of both chambers of the Illinois General Assembly.

== Election information ==
1990 was a midterm election year in the United States.

=== Turnout ===
For the primaries, turnout was 32.62%, with 1,962,284 ballots cast (with 1,123,972 Democratic ballots, 805,381 Republican ballots, 525 Illinois Solidarity, 21 Independent Progressive, and 32,385 nonpartisan ballots cast).

For the general election, turnout was 56.71%, with 3,420,720 ballots cast.

=== Straight-ticket voting ===
Illinois had a straight-ticket voting option in 1990.

Party	Number of straight-ticket votes
Democratic	498,918
Republican	360,273
Illinois Solidarity	2,108
Independent Progressive	7
Jim Wham	394
Libertarian	3,005

== Federal elections ==
=== United States Senate ===
Incumbent Democrat Paul Simon was reelected to a second term.

=== United States House ===
All 22 of Illinois' seats in the United States House of Representatives were up for election in 1990.

The Democratic Party flipped one Republican-held seat, making the composition of Illinois' House delegation 15 Democrats and 7 Republicans.

== State elections ==
=== Governor and Lieutenant Governor ===
1990 Illinois gubernatorial election
- November 6, 1990
- Turnout: 54.00%
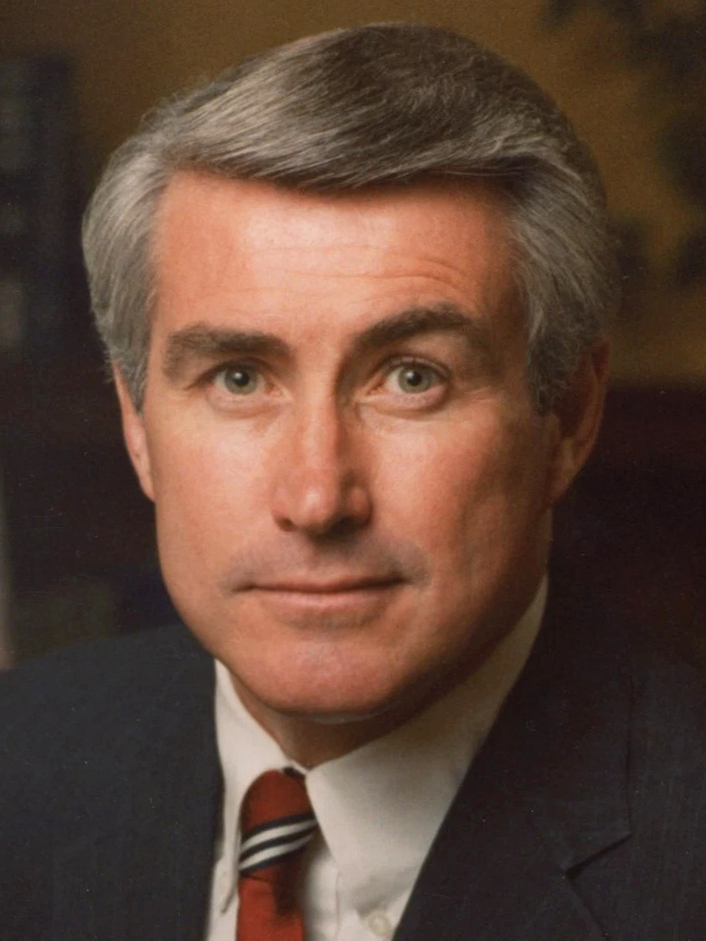

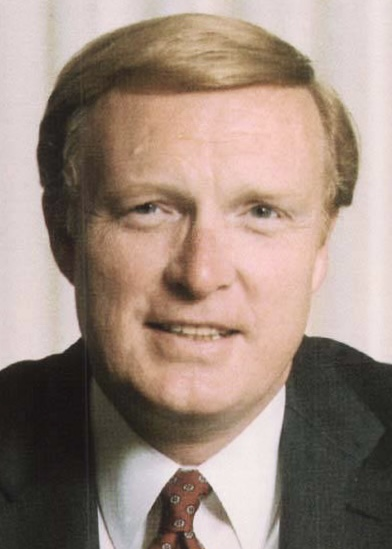
Nominee	Jim Edgar	Neil Hartigan
Party	Republican	Democratic
Running mate	Bob Kustra	James B. Burns
Popular vote	1,653,126	1,569,217
Percentage	50.8%	48.2%
- County results Edgar: 40–50% 50–60% 60–70% Hartigan: 40–50% 50–60% 60–70% 70–80%
Governor before election
James R. Thompson
Republican
Elected Governor
Jim Edgar
Republican

Incumbent Governor James R. Thompson did not seek reelection to a fifth term. Republican Jim Edgar was elected to succeed him in office, defeating Democrat Neil Hartigan by a narrow margin of about 80,000 votes.

Gubernatorial election
Party	Candidate	Votes	%
Republican	Jim Edgar / Bob Kustra	1,653,126	50.75
Democratic	Neil Hartigan / James B. Burns	1,569,217	48.17
Illinois Solidarity	Jessie Fields	35,067	1.08
Total votes		3,257,410	

=== Attorney General ===
1990 Illinois Attorney General election
- November 6, 1990
- Turnout: 53.33%
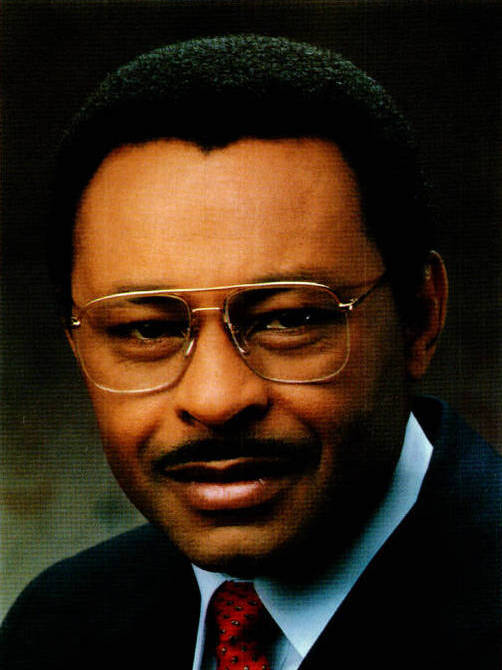

Nominee	Roland Burris	Jim Ryan
Party	Democratic	Republican
Popular vote	1,656,045	1,560,831
Percentage	51.48%	48.52%
- County results Burris: 50–60% 60–70% 70–80% Ryan: 50–60% 60–70% 70–80%
Attorney General before election
Neil Hartigan
Democratic
Elected Attorney General
Roland Burris
Democratic

Incumbent Attorney General Neil Hartigan, a Democrat, did not run for a third term, instead opting to run for governor. Democrat Roland Burris was elected to succeed him in office.

==== Democratic primary ====
Illinois Comptroller Roland Burris won the Democratic primary, running unopposed.

Attorney General Democratic primary
Party	Candidate	Votes	%
Democratic	Roland Burris	801,279	100
Total votes		801,279	100

==== Republican primary ====
Attorney General Republican primary
Party	Candidate	Votes	%
Republican	Jim Ryan	645,000	100
Total votes		645,000	100

==== General election ====
Attorney General election
Party	Candidate	Votes	%
Democratic	Roland Burris	1,656,045	51.48
Republican	Jim Ryan	1,560,831	48.52
Total votes		3,216,876	100

=== Secretary of State ===
1990 Illinois Secretary of State election
- November 6, 1990
- Turnout: 52.16%
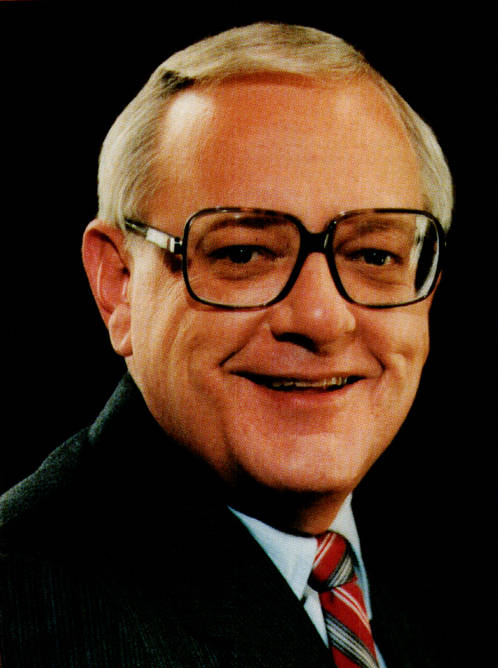

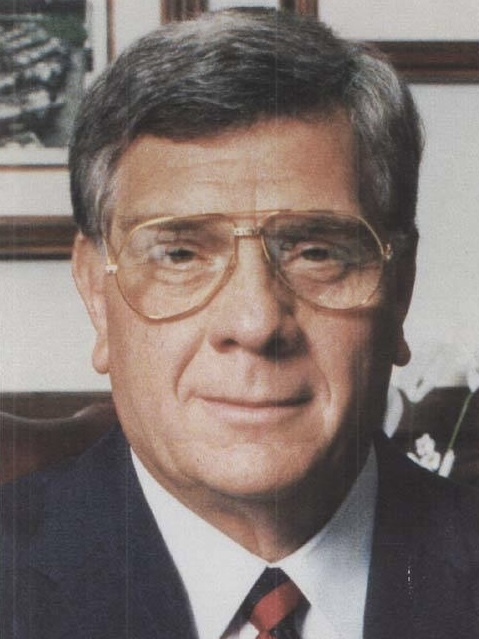
Nominee	George Ryan	Jerome Cosentino
Party	Republican	Democratic
Popular vote	1,680,531	1,465,785
Percentage	53.41%	46.59%
- County results Ryan: 50–60% 60–70% 70–80% Cosentino: 50–60% 60–70%
Secretary of State before election
Jim Edgar
Republican
Elected Secretary of State
George Ryan
Republican

Incumbent Secretary of State Jim Edgar, a Republican first appointed in 1981 and subsequently reelected to two full terms, did not seek reelection to another term, instead opting to run for governor. Republican George Ryan was elected to succeed him in office.

==== Democratic primary ====
Illinois Treasurer Jerome Cosentino won the Democratic primary, running unopposed.

Secretary of State Democratic primary
Party	Candidate	Votes	%
Democratic	Jerry Cosentino	769,279	100
Total votes		769,279	100

==== Republican primary ====
Lieutenant Governor of Illinois George Ryan won the Republican primary, running unopposed.

Secretary of State Republican primary
Party	Candidate	Votes	%
Republican	George H. Ryan	639,808	100
Total votes		639,808	100

==== General election ====
Secretary of State election
Party	Candidate	Votes	%
Republican	George H. Ryan	1,680,531	53.41
Democratic	Jerome Cosentino	1,465,785	46.59
Total votes		3,146,316	100

=== Comptroller ===
1990 Illinois State Comptroller election
- November 6, 1990
- Turnout: 52.01%
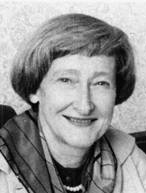

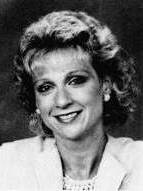
Nominee	Dawn Clark Netsch	Sue Suter
Party	Democratic	Republican
Popular vote	1,696,414	1,440,747
Percentage	54.07%	45.93%
- County results Netsch: 50–60% 60–70% 70–80% Suter: 50–60% 60–70%
State Comptroller before election
Roland Burris
Democratic
Elected State Comptroller
Dawn Clark Netsch
Democratic

Incumbent Comptroller Roland Burris, a Democrat, did not seek reelection to a fourth term, instead opting to run for Attorney General. Democrat Dawn Clark Netsch was elected to succeed him in office.

==== Democratic primary ====
State Senator Dawn Clark Netsch defeated attorney Shawn Collins, State Representative Woody Bowman, and Kane County Democratic Party Chairman Bill Sarto.

Secretary of State Democratic primary
Party	Candidate	Votes	%
Democratic	Dawn Clark Netsch	401,928	47.73
Democratic	Shawn Collins	230,889	27.42
Democratic	Woody Bowman	135,321	16.07
Democratic	Bill Sarto	73,993	8.79
Total votes		842,131	100

==== Republican primary ====
Republican Sue Suter, the director of the Illinois Department of Public Aid who previously from 1984 until 1988 had been head of the Illinois Department of Rehabilitation Services, won the Republican primary unopposed. This was Suter's first attempt at elected office.

Secretary of State Republican primary
Party	Candidate	Votes	%
Republican	Sue Suter	600,830	100
Total votes		600,830	100

==== General election ====
Comptroller election
Party	Candidate	Votes	%
Democratic	Dawn Clark Netsch	1,696,414	54.07
Republican	Sue Suter	1,440,747	45.93
Total votes		3,137,161	100

=== Treasurer ===
1990 Illinois State Treasurer election
- November 6, 1990
- Turnout: 51.81%
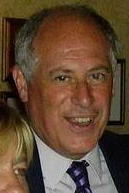

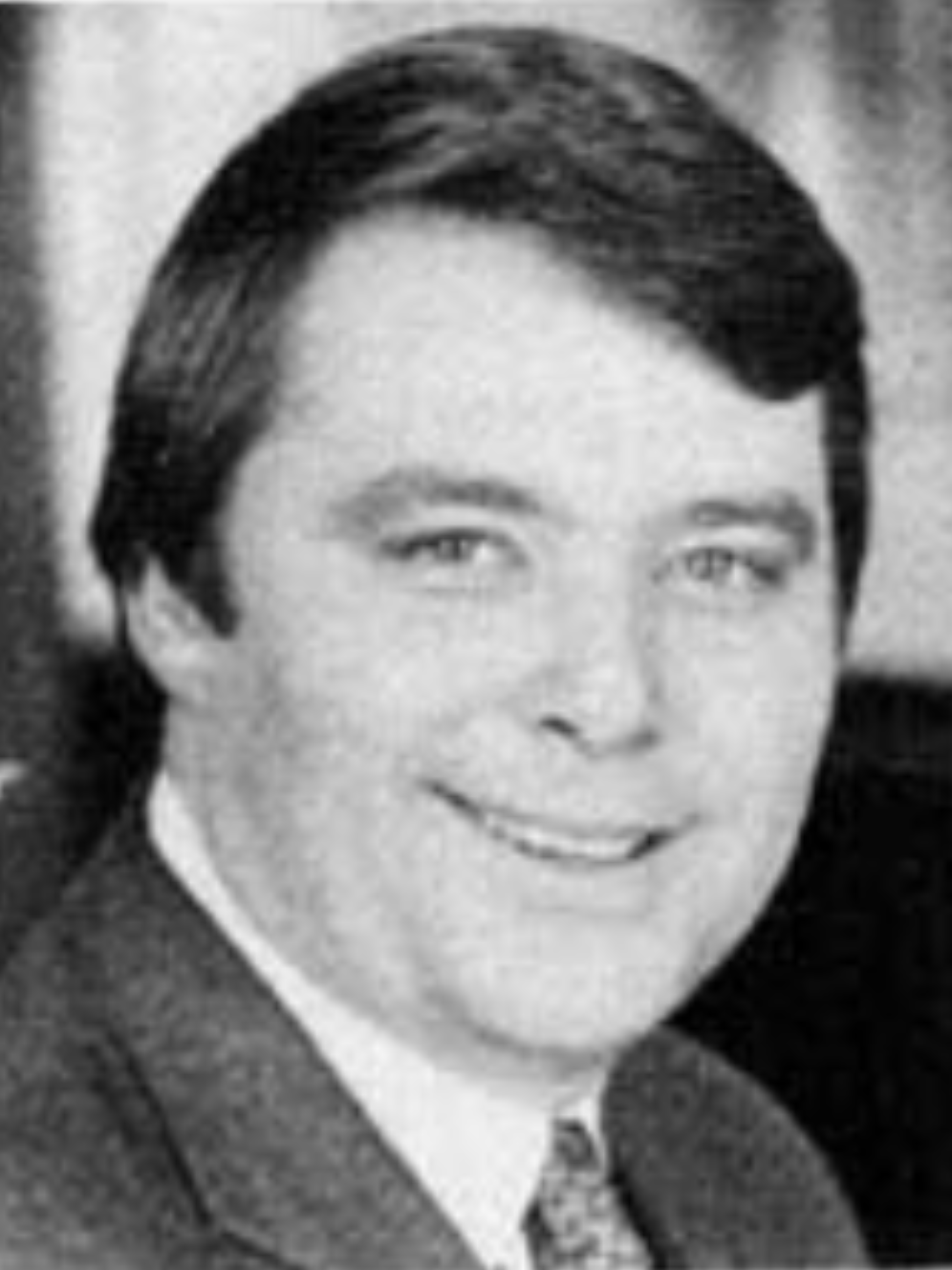
Nominee	Pat Quinn	Greg Baise
Party	Democratic	Republican
Popular vote	1,740,742	1,384,492
Percentage	55.70%	44.30%
- County results Quinn: 50–60% 60–70% 70–80% Baise: 50–60% 60–70%
Treasurer before election
Jerome Cosentino
Democratic
Elected Treasurer
Pat Quinn
Democratic

Incumbent Treasurer Jerome Cosentino, a Democrat, did not run for what would have been a third overall (second consecutive) term, instead opting to run for Secretary of State. Democrat Pat Quinn was elected to succeed him in office.

==== Democratic primary ====
Former Cook County Board of Tax Appeals commissioner and Chicago Revenue Director Pat Quinn defeated State Representative Peg McDonnell Breslin. Quinn previously had been an unsuccessful candidate for the Democratic nomination in 1986.

Breslin had been the candidate endorsed by the Democratic Party organization.

Treasurer Democratic primary
Party	Candidate	Votes	%
Democratic	Patrick Quinn	449,442	51.12
Democratic	Peg McDonnell Breslin	429,810	48.88
Total votes		879,252	100

==== Republican primary ====
Former Illinois Secretary of Transportation Greg Baise won the Republican primary unopposed.

Treasurer Republican primary
Party	Candidate	Votes	%
Republican	Greg Baise	594,238	100
Total votes		594,238	100

==== General election ====
Baise campaigned on a message of conservatism. Quinn campaigned as a populist reformer in opposition to big government.

During the general election campaign, Quinn won the endorsement of the AFL–CIO.

Treasurer election
Party	Candidate	Votes	%
Democratic	Patrick Quinn	1,740,742	55.70
Republican	Greg Baise	1,384,492	44.30
Write-in	Paul Salander	55	0.00
Total votes		3,125,289	100

=== State Senate ===
Some of the seats of the Illinois Senate were up for election in 1990. Democrats retained control of the chamber.

=== State House of Representatives ===
All of the seats in the Illinois House of Representatives were up for election in 1990. Democrats retained control of the chamber.

=== Trustees of University of Illinois ===
1990 Trustees of University of Illinois election
- November 6, 1990

An election was held for three of nine seats for Trustees of University of Illinois system for six-year terms.

The election saw the reelection of incumbent Democrat Gloria Jackson Bacon to a second term and incumbent Republican Susan Loving Gravenhorst to a third term, as well as the election of new trustee Democrat Thomas R. Lamont.

Fourth-term incumbent Republican Ralph Crane Hahn lost reelection.

Trustees of the University of Illinois election
Party	Candidate	Votes	%
Democratic	Gloria Jackson Bacon (incumbent)	1,597,215	19.00
Republican	Susan Loving Gravenhorst (incumbent)	1,416,930	16.86
Democratic	Tom Lamont	1,412,371	16.80
Republican	Ralph Crane Hahn (incumbent)	1,330,902	15.84
Democratic	Joe Luco	1,311,182	15.60
Republican	John G. Huftalin	1,110,264	13.21
Illinois Solidarity	Martin C. Ortega	226,103	2.69
Total votes		8,404,967	100

=== Judicial elections ===
Multiple judicial positions were up for election in 1990.

=== Ballot measure ===
Illinois voters voted on a single ballot measure in 1990. In order to be approved, the measure required either 60% support among those specifically voting on the amendment or 50% support among all ballots cast in the elections.

==== Redemption Periods for Property Sold for Non-Payment of Taxes Amendment ====
Voters approved the Redemption Periods for Property Sold for Non-Payment of Taxes Amendment, a legislatively referred constitutional amendment which amended Article IX, Section 8 of the Constitution of Illinois to reduce the redemption period on the tax sale of certain delinquent properties.

Redemption Periods for Property Sold for Non-Payment of Taxes Amendment
Option	Votes	% of votes on measure	% of all ballots cast
Yes	1,004,546	72.25	29.37
No	385,772	27.75	11.28
Total votes	1,390,318	100	40.64
Voter turnout	23.05%		

Amendment results by county Yes: 70–80%; 60–70%; 50–60%; No: 50–60%

== Local elections ==
Local elections were held. These included county elections, such as the Cook County elections.
