= Ben Nuckels =

American political strategist (born 1979)

- Born: January 18, 1979 (age 47); Carroll, Iowa
- Occupation: Political Consultant
- Political party: Democratic Party
- Website: www.nuckelsmediapartners.com

Ben Nuckels (born January 18, 1979) is an American political strategist and former campaign manager. Nuckels is a founding partner of the Washington D.C.–based Democratic media consulting business, Nuckels Media Partners.

== Career ==
Nuckels has helped elect Governors, Senators, Members of Congress, State Supreme Court Justices, and Mayors. Nuckels was the media strategist for Wisconsin Governor Tony Evers’ victory over Governor Scott Walker in 2018 that the Washington Post labeled, "...potentially the greatest Democratic victory of the midterms.” In 2022, Nuckels reprised his role in Evers' victory over Wisconsin businessman Tim Michels.

Nuckels has helped re-elect U.S. Senator Jon Tester of Montana, Congresswoman Betty McCollum of Minnesota, and Congresswoman Abby Finkenauer of Iowa, and former New Hampshire Governor and current Senator Maggie Hassan. Nuckels has also produced public affairs advertising for Airbnb, and helped defeat soccer superstar David Beckham's MLS soccer stadium proposal at PortMiami. Nuckels previously co-founded the political communications business, Strother Nuckels Strategies.

Prior to consulting, Nuckels was the campaign manager to former Illinois Governor Pat Quinn's successful election that Real Clear Politics deemed one of the top upsets in the country in 2010. He also served as Chief of Staff to Wisconsin Lieutenant Governor Barbara Lawton.

Nuckels has also been a subject matter expert in publications such as the New York Times, Detroit Free Press, Fox News, and Campaigns & Elections Magazine.

== Personal life ==
Nuckels was born in Carroll, Iowa. Nuckels is now a Wisconsin resident.
