= Patrick M. Collins =

American lawyer (born 1964)

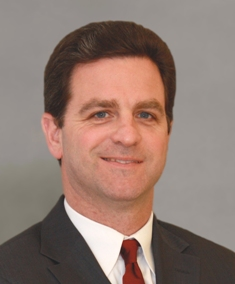
Patrick M. Collins, Partner, King & Spalding LLP

Patrick M. Collins (born September 1, 1964), is an American lawyer. Collins is a partner in King & Spalding LLP's Special Matters and Government Investigations practice. Previously, he was a partner at Perkins Coie LLP. Prior to joining Perkins Coie, Collins worked for the United States Department of Justice as an assistant U.S. Attorney. In 2005, he led the U.S. government's team in the trial and conviction of former Illinois Governor George Ryan on charges of racketeering and fraud. In 2009, Illinois Governor Pat Quinn appointed Collins to chair the Illinois Reform Commission, which was tasked with making recommendations for ethical reform for Illinois government. Several of the IRC's recommendations became the basis for new state legislation, including an overhauled Freedom of Information Act and the state's first measures to limit campaign finance in history. In January 2010, Collins authored a book entitled Challenging the Culture of Corruption: Game Changing Reform for Illinois.(ISBN 978-0879464240). In 2010, Collins was selected by the Chicago Law Bulletin as one of Chicago's "Top Ten" attorneys of the decade. Prior to his 12 years with the Department of Justice, Collins worked as an associate in private practice.

== United States Department of Justice ==
From 1995 - 2007, Collins worked as a federal prosecutor for the United States Department of Justice in the Chicago office of U.S. Attorney Patrick Fitzgerald. Collins was the lead prosecutor in the trial and conviction of former Illinois Governor George Ryan. The Ryan trial was the culmination of Operation Safe Road, an eight-year investigation which led to more than 75 convictions, including the former Governor and members of his inner circle. During his tenure with the U.S. Department of Justice, Collins also led a long-term investigation into corruption in City government and ghost payrolling in county government.

Collins was awarded the U.S. Attorney General's Award for Superior Performance by Litigative Team; Chicago Crime Commission's Stars of Distinction Award; Director's Award for Superior Performance as an AUSA, and Chief Postal Inspector's Award for his work on Operation Safe Road.

== After Department of Justice ==
In 2007, Collins was selected as lead trial counsel for the Indiana Attorney General's Office in a civil Racketeer Influenced and Corrupt Organizations Act case, and, in 2008, as outside counsel for Wayne County Airport Authority's investigation of its multimillion dollar Disadvantaged Business Enterprise program (DBE), which led to a U.S. Department of Justice civil settlement with airport contractors for fraudulent DBE activities. In September 2009, Collins was appointed by the United States Trustee and confirmed by the U.S. Bankruptcy Court as the Chapter 11 trustee for the A & O Life Fund LLC and six related estates.

== Horizons for Youth ==
In 1991, Collins co-founded Horizons for Youth, an organization that provides scholarships, mentoring and a community of support for children from low-resource areas of Chicago. Collins has served as president, a board member and a mentor.

== Education ==
Collins is a graduate of Benet Academy Class of 1982. He is a graduate of the University of Chicago Law School and received his undergraduate degree in Economics, magna cum laude, from the University of Notre Dame.
