= Pat Quinn (politician) =

Governor of Illinois from 2009 to 2015

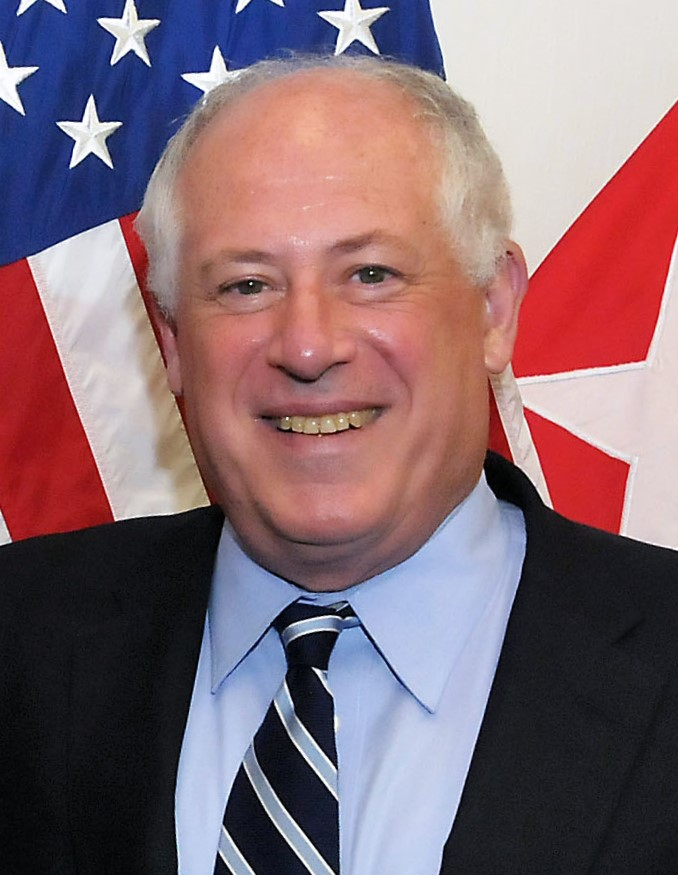
- Quinn in 2013

41st Governor of Illinois
- In office January 29, 2009 – January 12, 2015
- Lieutenant: Sheila Simon
- Preceded by: Rod Blagojevich
- Succeeded by: Bruce Rauner

45th Lieutenant Governor of Illinois
- In office January 13, 2003 – January 29, 2009
- Governor: Rod Blagojevich
- Preceded by: Corinne Wood
- Succeeded by: Sheila Simon

70th Treasurer of Illinois
- In office January 14, 1991 – January 9, 1995
- Governor: Jim Edgar
- Preceded by: Jerome Cosentino
- Succeeded by: Judy Baar Topinka

Commissioner of the Cook County Board of Appeals
- In office 1982–1986
- Preceded by: Seymour Zaban
- Succeeded by: Wilson Frost

Personal details
- Born: Patrick Joseph Quinn Jr. December 16, 1948 (age 77) Chicago, Illinois, U.S.
- Party: Democratic
- Spouse(s): Julie Hancock (m. 1982; div. 1986) Monica Walker (m. 2025)
- Children: 2
- Education: Georgetown University (BS); Northwestern University (JD)

Patrick Joseph Quinn (born December 16, 1948) is an American politician who served as the 41st governor of Illinois from 2009 to 2015. A Democrat, Quinn began his career as a political activist, founding the Coalition for Political Honesty, which organized citizen-initiated referendums advocating political reform. He later served as a commissioner on the Cook County Board of Tax Appeals from 1982 to 1986, Illinois Treasurer from 1991 to 1995, and the 45th lieutenant governor of Illinois from 2003 to 2009.

Born in Chicago, Illinois, Quinn is a graduate of Georgetown University and Northwestern University School of Law. He began his political career working as a campaign organizer and then aide to Illinois Governor Dan Walker before launching a series of citizen-led petition drives, including the 1976 Political Honesty Initiative and the 1980 Cutback Amendment, which reduced the size of the Illinois House of Representatives from 177 to 118. The amendment marked the first and only time Illinois voters used the initiative process to enact a constitutional amendment or law.

After the passage of the Cutback Amendment, Quinn continued to organize petition drives and was elected as a Commissioner on the Cook County Board of Appeals in 1982; he later served as revenue director in the administration of Chicago Mayor Harold Washington. He was elected Treasurer of Illinois in 1990 and subsequently ran unsuccessful campaigns for secretary of state in 1994, United States senator in 1996, and Lieutenant Governor in 1998.

In 2002, Quinn won the Democratic nomination for Lieutenant Governor of Illinois and was elected alongside gubernatorial candidate Rod Blagojevich in the general election. Both Quinn and Blagojevich were reelected in 2006. Quinn assumed the governorship on January 29, 2009, after Blagojevich was impeached and removed from office on corruption charges.

Quinn won a full term in the 2010 gubernatorial election, winning by a margin of less than 1% against Republican state senator Bill Brady in an upset. While in office, Quinn worked to provide voters the power to recall the governor, passed a $31 billion capital construction plan, passed ethics reforms, legalized civil unions and same-sex marriage, expanded state coverage under the Affordable Care Act, instituted the Put Illinois to Work program, initiated the Illinois Secure Choice retirement savings program, and abolished the death penalty. He lost re-election in 2014 to the Republican nominee, Bruce Rauner. He later ran an unsuccessful campaign for the Democratic nomination for attorney general of Illinois in 2018.

== Early life and education ==
Quinn was born December 16, 1948, at Mercy Hospital in the South Shore neighborhood of Chicago, the son of Patrick Joseph "P. J." Quinn and the former Eileen Prindiville. P. J. Quinn and his wife Eileen both grew up in the Englewood neighborhood on the South Side of Chicago.

Quinn's father enlisted in the U.S. Navy at the outbreak of World War II, serving in the Pacific Theater aboard several ships including the USS Bon Homme Richard. He served for three years, one month, and 15 days. In a commendation letter from his commanding officer, Quinn was described as "one of the finest men with whom I have ever worked. Extremely capable in his work, he was at all times cheerful, earnest, cooperative, frank, and honest." After World War II, Quinn graduated from DePaul University thanks to the G.I. Bill. He worked for the Catholic Cemeteries of Chicago for 40 years.

Eileen Prindiville was born before American women had the right to vote under the Nineteenth Amendment to the United States Constitution in 1920 and graduated from the Academy of Our Lady in 1935. Eileen worked for decades as an assistant to the principal of the Hinsdale Public Middle School. P. J. and Eileen Quinn raised three sons in a single-family home in Hinsdale, Illinois, thanks to a mortgage secured by the Veterans Administration.

Quinn attended St. Isaac Jogues for elementary school in Hinsdale before attending Fenwick High School in Oak Park. Quinn was the cross-country team captain and sports editor of the school newspaper. Quinn then on to graduate from Georgetown University in 1971 with a Bachelor of Science in Foreign Service (BSFS) degree from the Edmund A. Walsh School of Foreign Service, where he was a student of Professor Jan Karski and sports editor for The Hoya.

From 1967 through 1971, Quinn was captain of the Bad Motor Scooters, a traveling basketball team that competed successfully in summer basketball tournaments at Hilliard Homes, Stateway Gardens, 66th and Kimbark on Chicago’s South Side, and Martin Luther King Boys Club on the West Side, where he played against Chicago Bulls legend Bob “Butterbean” Love. Quinn remains a dedicated sports fan, including the Chicago White Sox, Chicago Bears, Chicago Blackhawks, and the Chicago Bulls. He is the only Illinois governor known to have dunked a basketball.

After serving in state government and spearheading three major statewide initiative petition drives, Quinn earned a Juris Doctor degree from Northwestern University School of Law in 1980.

Quinn is the eldest of three boys. Tom Quinn has been an attorney since 1979 and his proudest moment in the courtroom was winning a legal settlement in a major case that targeted housing discrimination in the south suburbs of Chicago. John Quinn served as an American history teacher at Fenwick from 1980 to 2022 and served as head basketball coach for more than 30 years. He is in the Illinois Basketball Hall of Fame. P. J., Eileen, Tom, and John always played energetic roles in Pat's petition and referendum drives and political campaigns.

Quinn later married Julie Hancock in 1982 before divorcing in 1986, and later married Monica Walker in 2025.

== Family history and heritage ==
Quinn's relatives hailed from County Mayo in Ireland, where the term boycott was invented following a mass tenant farmer movement against a cruel, unpopular land agent, Charles Boycott. Quinn's grandparents left Ireland in the early 1900s to emigrate to the United States. His paternal grandfather, also named Patrick Quinn, had a stint as a copper miner in Butte, Montana, then came to Chicago's South Side. In 1915, he opened "Quinn's Groceries, Meats & Vegetables" in Chicago. His motto was "Quinn for Quality, Quantity and Service". Quinn's father, P. J. Quinn, worked in the family store and graduated from De La Salle Institute in 1932.

== Early activism ==
Before running for public office, Quinn worked as an organizer for Dan Walker in the 1972 Illinois gubernatorial primary election, working statewide on college campuses (1972 being the first election in which 18-year-olds could vote) before organizing the Metro East and southwestern Illinois in the general election. From January 1973 to July 1975, Quinn served as an ombudsman and assistant to the governor for labor and worker safety.

From July 1975 to December 1982, Quinn served as the secretary-treasurer of the Coalition for Political Honesty, a volunteer initiative petition and referendum organization. From October 1975 to 1976, the Coalition collected signatures and advocated for the Political Honesty Initiative, which called for referendums on three reforms: ending political double dipping, conflict-of-interest voting by Illinois legislators, and the practice of advance pay, wherein legislators could collect their entire annual salary on their first day in office. Radio host Wally Phillips of WGN-AM was among the Political Honesty Initiative petition signers and one of its greatest supporters. Petitions containing 635,128 signatures (an all-time record) were filed with the Illinois Secretary of State at the State Capitol on April 30, 1976, leading the General Assembly to quickly pass a bill in May 1976, ending the 100-year-old advance pay practice once and for all by requiring legislators to be paid monthly after doing their work. The referendum did not appear on the 1976 ballot following the case of Coalition for Political Honesty v. State Board of Elections, which hinged on whether the word "and" in the 1970 Illinois constitution was "conjunctive" or "disjunctive."

In 1976, as a result of Quinn's efforts to end the practice of advance pay, Quinn received a "standing boo-vation" from members of the Illinois General Assembly, led by State Representative Mike Madigan who said that didn’t deserve to be called a fellow Irishman.

In 1977, Quinn led a statewide petition drive for open primaries in Illinois, and in 1978, a statewide petition drive for a property tax freeze. On December 16, 1978, the anniversary of the Boston Tea Party, Quinn led a campaign where 40,000 Illinois taxpayers sent tea bags to the office of Governor James R. Thompson to protest a lame-duck 40% pay raise for legislators and state officials. Thompson had supported the pay raises, which were later roundly criticized by President Jimmy Carter, United States Senators Adlai Stevenson III and Charles H. Percy, and others. Thompson angrily defended his actions, saying that the governor is not "a nine-to-five clerk," calling it "a different job," but ultimately the tea bag movement prevailed.

Beginning in 1979, Quinn and the Coalition for Political Honesty began an initiative petition drive for what became known as the Cutback Amendment, a constitutional amendment to reduce the size of the Illinois House of Representatives from 177 to 118 members and abolish cumulative voting, requiring House members to run in single-member districts. The proposal was supported by the League of Women Voters. After the petition drive began, the Illinois General Assembly passed legislation to make it more difficult to pass initiative petitions. After submitting 477,112 signatures, the Illinois State Board of Elections struck the question from the ballot, citing the new law, resulting in a lawsuit, Coalition for Political Honesty v. State Board of Elections (II) (1980), the Illinois Supreme Court case found that the petition restrictions were unconstitutional and on the voters' initiative power placed the question on the 1980 ballot.

Illinois voters approved the Cutback Amendment by a 68.7 percent margin (2,112,224 to 962,325) on November 4, 1980. It marked the first and only time in state history that Illinois voters had used initiative petition and binding referendum to enact a constitutional amendment or law. The Associated Press ranked the Cutback Amendment movement as the state's top story of the year.

In 1981 and 1982, Quinn led an initiative petition drive to amend the 1970 Illinois Constitution with the "Illinois Initiative". This amendment was intended to increase the power of petition and binding referendums in the political process. The petition drive collected a sufficient number of signatures, but the Illinois Appellate Court ruled in Lousin v. State Board of Elections (1982) that it could not appear on the ballot.

In 1982, Quinn and the Coalition placed a question on the Chicago ballot calling for a Citizens Utility Board to protect consumers. In 1983, 110 towns in Illinois placed the CUB question on their ballots. On September 20, 1983, Gov. James Thompson signed the Citizens Utility Board (CUB) law (Public Act 83-945) to provide “effective and democratic representation of utility consumers before the Illinois Commerce Commission, the General Assembly, the courts and other public bodies, and by providing consumer education on utility services prices and methods of energy conservation.”

In July 1984, the first CUB membership inserts were included in 3.5 million phone bills. Some 30,000 consumers quickly sent back $5 to join the new group. The next month, 2.3 million gas customers received the CUB insert along with 5 million electric customers in September 1984. Within six months, CUB had grown to 100,000 dues-paying members from all 102 counties in Illinois.

In a 2019 oral history interview, Barbara Flynn Currie said that Quinn has "more populism in his pinky finger than most of the rest of us have in our whole bodies."

== Political career ==
=== Cook County Board of Appeals (1982–1986) ===
In 1982, Quinn won the Democratic primary to serve as a commissioner on the Cook County Board of Appeals, now known as the Cook County Board of Review. In a three-way primary for two positions, Quinn was able to beat one of the incumbents who had presided over a scandal in which 37 people were convicted for fixing property tax assessment appeal cases. He was endorsed by then-US Congressman Harold Washington, who argued that Quinn would "make an outstanding member of the Board of Appeals." Quinn established an ethics code and established a practice of not taking campaign contribution from tax attorneys.

=== 1986 state treasurer campaign ===
In 1986, Quinn chose to run in the Democratic primary for Illinois treasurer in a four-way primary that also included incumbent treasurer James Donnewald, former treasurer Jerome Cosentino, and LaRouche movement member Robert D. Hart.

In the March 18, 1986, Democratic primary, Donnewald lost to his predecessor, Cosentino, 29.47% to 30.22%, with Quinn coming in a close third with 26.18%.

=== Chicago Revenue Director (1986-1987) ===
As the 1987 Chicago mayoral election began, incumbent Mayor Harold Washington faced stiff opposition from former Mayor Jane Byrne in the Democratic primary in February. One issue that rose to prominence was the Chicago Revenue Department, which had been seen as incompetent and corrupt. Washington fired Charles E. Sawyer due to unethical conduct. Washington turned to Quinn, whom he described as "committed to reform," to head the department, effective in November 1986. A Chicago Tribune columnist referred to Quinn as "Mr. Clean" and called him an "obstinately possessed reformer" and "a fine choice." Upon his appointment to the position of Revenue Director, Quinn said:

It's a trust, and the trust belongs to the City of Chicago. There's a lot of people in Chicago that live from paycheck to paycheck. They deserve a fair, efficient, and competent enforcement of the revenue laws.

— Pat Quinn

Prompted by the Washington administration, Quinn went public with many instances of unethical conduct and reforms, which were lauded by newspapers and reformers. Quinn found multiple instances of favoritism and political interference. While in office, he also launched a successful parking ticket amnesty program to ensure bills were paid, and made the first-ever agreement between the Chicago Revenue Department and the Illinois Department of Revenue.

During the 1987 Chicago mayoral elections, Washington defeated former Mayor Jane Byrne in the Democratic Primary, and he later faced Ed Vrdolyak of the Solidarity Party, Thomas Hynes of the Chicago First Party, and Donald Haider of the Republican Party in the general election. Washington's campaign regularly spotlighted Quinn and his work at the Revenue Department during both election cycles. After securing a second term, Washington aides Ernest Barefield and Lucille Dobbins orchestrated Quinn's ouster. Quinn resigned at Washington's request on June 25, 1987, writing in his resignation letter, "I am proud of my work at the Department of Revenue and I am proud of the programs and policy changes I've initiated. I remain committed to making government adhere to the highest standards of integrity and competence." Quinn said that when he was hired, he'd been instructed, "No monkey business, no politics, and go by the book," and he said upon his resignation, "I can look myself in the eye every morning and know that's exactly what I did."

A number of issues were later discovered to have motivated Washington's inner circle to turn on Quinn, including Quinn's insistence that politically-connected business owners under court order to pay back unremitted city taxes continue to do so. Daniel Ruth wrote in a tongue-in-cheek column, "Quinn had committed the most unpardonable of civil service sins as revenue director. He had the audacity to do his job."

=== Illinois State Treasurer (1991–1995) ===
Incumbent Treasurer Jerome Cosentino, a Democrat, did not run for what would have been a third overall (second consecutive) term, instead opting to run for Secretary of State. Quinn won the 1990 Democratic primary for Illinois treasurer, defeating State Representative Peg McDonnell Breslin, who had been slated by the Democratic Party, in the primary, 51%-49%. Quinn defeated Republican Greg Baise in the general election. Quinn campaigned as a consumer and taxpayer advocate in opposition to big government. Quinn won with 55.7% of the vote.

He pledged during his campaign that he would seek to transform the office into a consumer advocate-style position. As a candidate, he refused to take campaign contributions from banks and banking officials. He also pledged as a candidate to modernize the office and maximize returns on state deposits through use of electronic fund transfers and through expanding linked-deposit programs. He released an "Invest in Illinois" plan which proposed competitive bidding from financial institutions wanting to be state depositories. He also promised that he would not deposit or invest assets used to pay employee retirement benefits in junk bonds. He also pledged to implement a professional code of ethics for the office's employees.

In 1994, then-State Treasurer Pat Quinn unveiled the first State Inspector Misconduct Act. It would impose a Class A misdemeanor and loss of job for soliciting campaign contributions from anyone engaged in a business which the state employee regulates or inspects, and create a toll-free hotline for whistleblowers. For seven years, the General Assembly considered (and rejected) versions of Quinn's Inspector Misconduct reforms sponsored by State Representative John Fritchey every session. On August 28, 2002, Governor George Ryan finally signed the Illinois Inspector Misconduct Act (Public Act 92-853) which banned the long-time practice of state employees soliciting campaign contributions from individuals or businesses they regulate or inspect.

=== 1994 Secretary of State campaign ===
During his tenure as Treasurer, Quinn was publicly critical of Illinois Secretary of State and future governor, George Ryan, saying, "George Ryan has behaved like the sheriff of Nottingham, standing by while his army of inspectors squeezes more and more campaign money out of honest people." He drew attention to special vanity license plates that Ryan's office provided for cronies and the politically connected. Quinn challenged Ryan in the 1994 general election for Secretary of State. Quinn won the Democratic primary, defeating Illinois State Senator Denny Jacobs and LaRouche movement member Rose-Marie Love.

There was a great contrast between Quinn and Ryan, leading Illinois Issues to remark, "You couldn't find two more opposite candidates to run for secretary of state if you asked Hollywood to cast the race." One supporter remarked, "Just everything he talked about, term limits and giving power back to voters, I totally agreed with." Quinn's focus during the campaign was on making the office work for taxpayers and reducing wasteful spending that benefitted politicians, stating of the office:

"It works for the office-holders, but it's inefficient and wasteful for too many people. I know how to organize customers.... I think the secretary of state should be head of Citizens for Auto Reform."

Ryan beat Quinn 60.48% to 38.29% in a year that benefited the Republican Party nationally. Ryan was later convicted of federal corruption charges stemming from the illegal sale of commercial drivers licenses which resulted in the deaths of six children while serving as secretary of state; he spent more than five years in federal prison and seven months of home confinement.

=== 1996 U.S. Senate campaign ===
When United States Senator Paul Simon chose not to seek re-election in 1996, Quinn entered the race. However Richard Durbin won the Democratic primary and eventually the Senate seat.

=== 1998 lieutenant gubernatorial campaign ===
Quinn sought the Democratic nomination for lieutenant governor in 1998, but was narrowly defeated by Mary Lou Kearns by 1,300 votes.

=== Walk Across Illinois for Decent Healthcare (2001) ===
In August 2001, Quinn undertook what he called a “Walk Across Illinois for Decent Healthcare,” trekking across the state alongside his physician, longtime single-payer advocate Dr. Quentin Young to draw attention to gaps in coverage and push the case for “decent healthcare for everybody.” The walk began on the Centennial Bridge over the Mississippi River in Rock Island and ended 167 miles later at the statue of Abraham Lincoln near Lake Michigan in Chicago.

In 2019, Quinn's son, Patrick, did a similar walk to end homelessness, which Quinn joined.

=== Lieutenant Governor (2003-2009) ===
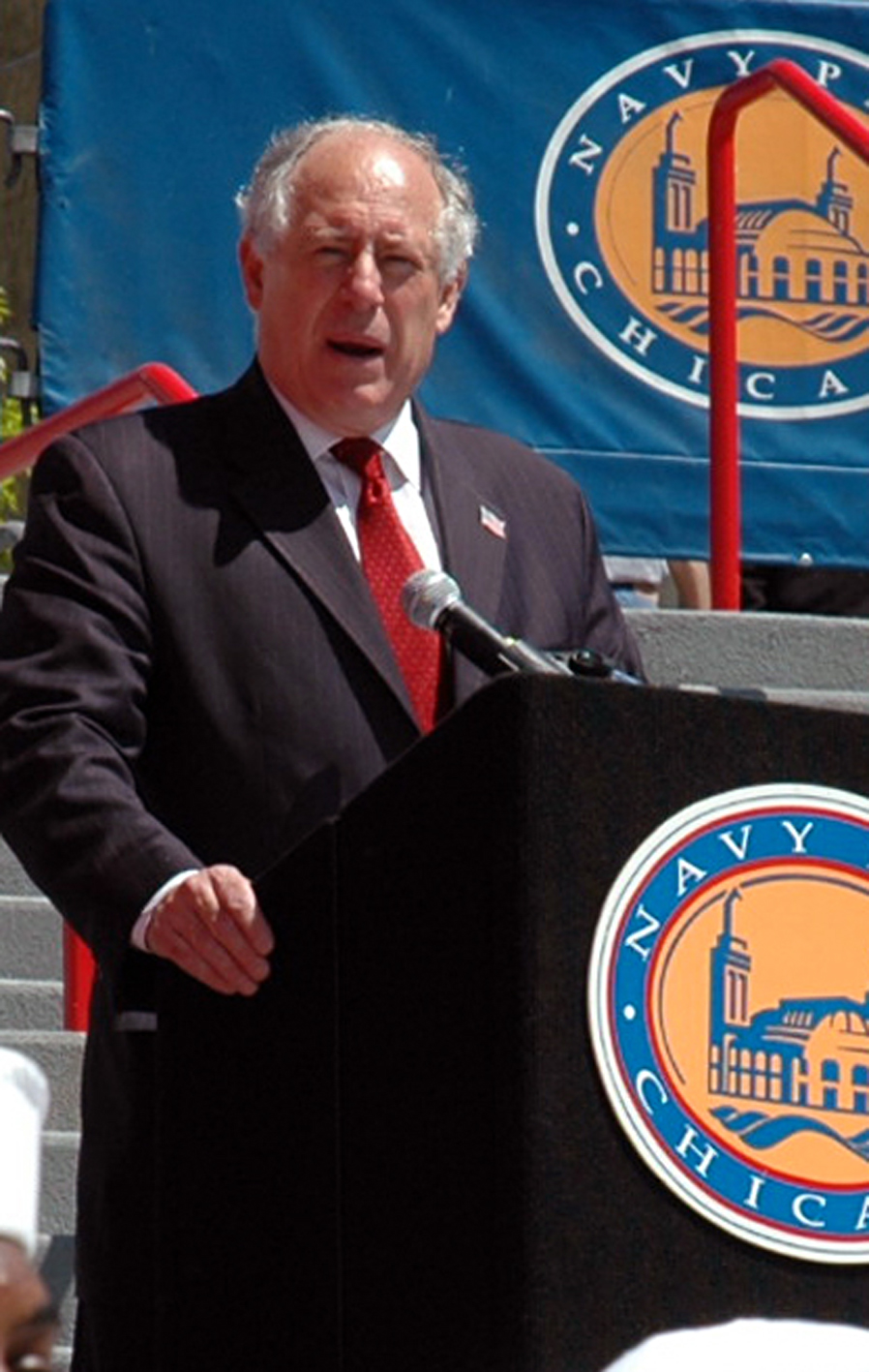
Quinn as lieutenant governor in 2006

Quinn won the Democratic nomination for lieutenant governor in March 2002, and subsequently won the general election on the Democratic ticket alongside gubernatorial nominee, Rod Blagojevich. In Illinois, candidates for lieutenant governor and governor at that time ran in separate primary elections, but were conjoined as a single ticket for the general election. This same ticket won re-election in 2006, where Quinn was unopposed in the primary. While Lieutenant Governor, according to his official biography, his priorities were consumer advocacy, environmental protection, health care, broadband deployment, and veterans' affairs.

Following the terrorist attacks on September 11, 2001, thousands of Illinois National Guard members and reservists were called to active duty in the Global War on Terror. The families of many Illinois citizen-soldiers faced a serious decline in household income, since their military pay was often much less than their civilian salary.

As a private citizen, Quinn had launched Operation Homefront in 2001 to help service members known their financial rights. Mary Beth Beiersdorf, a suburban mother of three, contacted Quinn who told him that her husband's employer had opted not to pay his salary while he was deployed. The family faced a 70% drop in income. Mary Beth knew that other military families faced similar hardships. Quinn championed legislation to provide assistance to military families beginning in 2001, and on February 7, 2003, Blagojevich signed the Illinois Military Family Relief Act (Public Act 92-886) to provide financial help to the families of Illinois National Guard members and reservists who were called to active duty after the terrorist attacks on the United States on September 11, 2001. The legislation added a new voluntary check-off box on income tax forms and gave the Illinois Department of Military Affairs the authority to disburse those funds.

Quinn had "paid his own expenses" many times as lieutenant governor. As a rule, he either paid his own way, or stayed at "cut rate hotels" (such as Super 8), and never charged the state for his meals.

Hardly a team, Quinn had a strained, almost nonexistent relationship with Rod Blagojevich. On December 14, 2008, when Quinn was asked about his relationship with Blagojevich, he said, "Well, he's a bit isolated. I tried to talk to the Governor, but the last time I spoke to him was in August of 2007. I think one of the problems is the Governor did sort of seal himself off from all the statewide officials ... Attorney General Madigan and myself and many others." Blagojevich had announced in 2006 that Quinn was not to be considered part of his administration.

== Governor of Illinois (2009-2015) ==
=== Succession and tenure ===
On January 29, 2009, Rod Blagojevich was removed from office by a vote of 59–0 by the Illinois State Senate, and Quinn was sworn in as the 41st Governor of Illinois.

Quinn served as Governor from January 29, 2009 to January 12, 2015. When Quinn took the oath of office, Illinois was in the midst of a triple crisis of government corruption at the highest level, budget instability, and economic collapse caused by the deepest recession since the Great Depression.

Quinn entered office during a dark chapter for Illinois politics. His early months were focused on restoring public trust, overhauling state leadership, and confronting a fiscal emergency.

Quinn made clear his priority was to restore integrity to state government after the Blagojevich scandal. He publicly declared that Illinois was entering an "era of reform," called for passage of stronger ethics laws and campaign finance reforms, and reached out to lawmakers from both parties to rebuild relationships damaged under Blagojevich, who had frequently feuded with the legislature.

==== Ethics reform ====
When Quinn was sworn in as governor, former Gov. George Ryan was in jail on federal corruption charges and Ryan's successor, Rod Blagojevich, had been impeached and removed as Governor for misconduct. Blagojevich was later convicted on federal corruption charges and sent to prison.

On January 5, 2009, while still lieutenant governor, Quinn created the Illinois Reform Commission, and appointed Patrick M. Collins as chair. It was tasked with making recommendations for ethical reform for Illinois government.

On his first day in office, Gov. Quinn dispatched crews to take down his predecessor's name which was plastered on dozens of Illinois Toll Highway signs across the state and on June 16, 2011, signed legislation prohibiting elected officials from putting their names on state road signs, billboards, or electronic signs.

On August 18, 2009, Gov. Quinn signed a law strengthening the Illinois Governmental Ethics Act (Public Act 96-555), which tightened scrutiny of elected officials, state employees, and lobbyists, and prohibited the promise of state jobs, contracts, or political favors in exchange for campaign contributions.

Quinn had long been a proponent of the power of recall, first working toward its passage locally in 1976. In 2000, Quinn led a "Recall Ryan" petition drive to remove Ryan for office for his involvement in the licenses for bribes scandal, which ultimately led to Ryan's indictment and 2008 conviction. As governor, pushed for a constitutional amendment to allow gubernatorial recall.

Known as House Joint Constitutional Amendment 31, the Recall Amendment was passed nearly unanimously by the General Assembly for consideration by voters in the November 2010 general election. HJCA 31 passed with 1,639,158 votes to 846,966 votes, or 65.9%, well above the required 60% threshold, making Illinois the 19th state to permit the recall of a governor.

In June 2009, Quinn launched a panel, chaired by Abner Mikva, to investigate unethical practices at the University of Illinois amid fears that a prior investigation would be ineffective in instituting necessary reforms. The panel was charged with searching the admissions practices, amid reports that the public university was a victim of corruption. The panel found evidence of favoritism and its investigation culminated in the resignation of all but two University trustees.

==== Budget, debt, and taxes ====
Quinn inherited a state budget that was in dire straits. The budget deficit grew daily due to the economic consequences of the Great Recession, when thousands of Illinoisans lost their jobs and their homes.

As Governor, Quinn signed six state budgets into law, cutting state spending by more than $5 billion while providing sufficient revenue for vital public services such as education, healthcare, public safety, and human services.

In July 2009, Quinn signed a $29 billion capital bill to provide construction and repair funds for Illinois roads, mass transit, schools, and other public works projects. The capital bill, known as "Illinois Jobs Now!", was the first since Governor George H. Ryan's Illinois FIRST plan, which was enacted in the late-1990s. On July 7, 2009, he for the second time in a week vetoed a budget bill, calling it "out of balance", his plan being to more significantly fix the budget gap in Illinois.

Quinn worked in tandem with President Barack Obama's American Recovery and Reinvestment Act and launched a new project called Put Illinois to Work, which The New York Times called "a job program that works."

The job total at Chrysler's Belvidere plant went from 200 employees to 4,500 during Quinn's time in office. Over the same period at Ford's plant on the South Side of Chicago, operations grew from one shift and 1,600 workers in 2009 to three shifts and 5,100 workers. Auto suppliers such as Continental Tire greatly benefitted.

By the time Quinn left office in January 2015, Illinois had made a significant economic comeback with job creation up and unemployment down across the state. Illinois’ unemployment rate dropped to its lowest level since before the Great Recession (6% in January 2015), and unemployment rates fell in every region of the state month after month. Nearly 300,000 private sector jobs were created after the end of the Great Recession, and Illinois’ average wages were eighth-highest in the country, outranking every midwestern state.

In 2025, an analysis by the Illinois Policy Institute found that Quinn's administration held the line on spending to a greater degree than any governor in the previous 25 years.

==== Infrastructure ====
During the Great Recession, Illinois launched the largest infrastructure investment in its history, anchored by Illinois Jobs Now!, the Clean Water Initiative, and the Move Illinois program with the Illinois Tollway system. Viewed together, Illinois Jobs Now!, the Clean Water Initiative, and Move Illinois represented a coordinated, statewide renewal of infrastructure in the State of Illinois, larger even than the subsequent Rebuild Illinois infrastructure program.

Illinois Jobs Now! committed $31 billion to rebuilding the state’s foundation—repairing nearly 8,980 miles of roads, 1,475 bridges, and more than 1,050 schools, while also modernizing public transit, housing, and other critical facilities.

Move Illinois is a 15-year, $14 billion capital program that rebuilt and widened the Jane Addams Memorial Tollway (I-90), constructed the Illinois Route 390 Tollway, began work on the I-490 Tollway, and reconstructed the Central Tri-State (I-294). These projects not only eased congestion and improved freight movement but also stimulated billions in economic growth and supported more than 111,070 jobs.

The $1 billion Clean Water Initiative upgraded aging drinking water and wastewater systems through low-interest loans to municipalities, ensuring healthier communities while creating thousands of construction jobs.

Together, these efforts generated hundreds of thousands of jobs and delivered improvements that touched every corner of Illinois.

Quinn also worked to save Roseland Hospital. "Roseland Community Hospital is an anchor in the community and we will do what we can to protect the patients and employees," Quinn said as he announced state funding to keep the hospital open.

==== Criminal justice and clemency ====
During his time as governor, Quinn sought to address a backlog of approximately 2,800 unresolved clemency petitions left by his predecessor, Rod Blagojevich. Between 2009 and 2015, Quinn acted on 4,928 clemency petitions – more than any other Illinois governor. Governor Quinn granted 1,795 and denied 3,133 petitions during his time in office. On his last day in office, Quinn commuted the sentence of Tyrone Hood, who was imprisoned for 22 years for a crime he did not commit. Cook County State's Attorney Anita Alvarez's press secretary criticized the decision publicly, but Alvarez later dropped the charges against Hood. The City of Chicago later authorized $17.5 million to be paid to Hood as a settlement for his wrongful conviction.

Quinn also pardoned abolitionists Richard Eells and Julius and Samuel Willard, who had been convicted for playing a part in the Underground Railroad.

==== State income tax ====
In March 2009, Quinn called for an increase in the personal income tax rate. To help offset the increased rate, he also sought to triple the amount shielded from taxation (or the "personal exemption") – from $2,000 per person to $6,000.

During the 2010 gubernatorial campaign, Quinn advocated for an increase in the income tax in order to shore up Illinois finances, a difficult topic during a year dominated by the Tea Party. State Senator Bill Brady, Quinn's opponent, opposed additional revenue. Despite being counted out by many political pundits, Quinn defeated Brady in the November 2010 election.

With the state budget deficit projected to hit $15 billion in 2011, after the 2010 election, the legislature in early 2011 raised the personal income tax from 3% to 5%, and the corporation profits tax 4.8% to 7%. Governor Quinn's office projected the new taxes would generate $6.8 billion a year, enough to balance the annual budget and begin reducing the state's backlog of about $8.5 billion in unpaid bills.

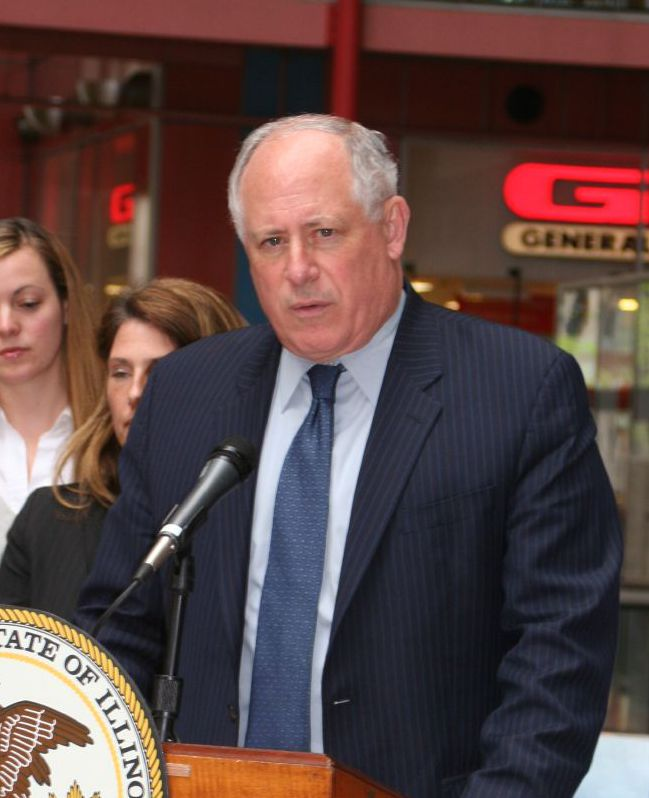
Governor Quinn at the Green expo in 2009

On January 13, 2011, Quinn signed legislation to impose comprehensive state spending caps and enable Illinois to have sufficient revenue for education, healthcare, public safety, human services, and actuarially-required pension funding for state employees and teachers.

On January 10, 2012, Quinn signed legislation to give tax relief by doubling the Illinois Earned Income Tax Credit and indexing the personal income tax exemption to the cost of living.

In early 2014, Quinn suggested a 3% income tax surcharge on the state's millionaires to provide more funding for education. On July 29, 2014, Gov. Quinn signed legislation for an advisory referendum asking voters if they favor an income tax surcharge on the state's millionaires in order to provide much-needed funding for public education in classrooms across Illinois. The proposal passed, but Quinn's successor, Bruce Rauner, himself very wealthy, did not implement it. A similar proposal passed ten years later, in 2024, at Quinn's urging.

==== ComEd rate hike vetoes ====
On July 10, 2009, Quinn signed legislation to create a payment plan option for low-income utility customers and cap the amount those customers pay for utilities.

In 2011, ComEd pushed the Energy Infrastructure Modernization Act, a “smart‑grid” law that switched consumer utility rates to an automatic formula, allowing regular rate increases based on costs rather than oversight. Quinn vetoed this bill in May 2011, saying, "We're the government of the people, and I don't think people are for this. I want to make it clear to the public that they should not be gouged ... by something they don't feel is providing better service."

The Illinois legislature, led by Speaker Michael Madigan, overrode his veto later that year. The law was amended to further weaken the Illinois Commerce Commission in 2013, which Quinn also vetoed. The legislature overrode that veto as well.

Federal investigations later showed that Commonwealth Edison, via lobbyists and executives, engaged in a bribery scheme Speaker Madigan and secure legislative backing for their 2011 and 2013 bills. Testimony from ComEd’s former general counsel, Thomas O’Neill, confirmed that they secured the override of Quinn’s veto alongside promises of no‑work contracts, internships, and other perks for Madigan’s associates. This became part of a larger federal case leading to the 2023 conviction of the so‑called “ComEd Four” — former CEO Anne Pramaggiore, lobbyist Mike McClain, and others — for bribery conspiracy, and ultimately the 2025 conviction of Madigan.

Quinn’s vetoes of the 2011 and 2013 ComEd-backed utility bills are largely viewed in hindsight as principled stands against corruption and corporate overreach, especially in light of the bribery convictions of ComEd executives and Speaker Madigan. Some editorial boards and watchdogs who once criticized him have since acknowledged he was right to oppose what turned out to be part of a corrupt scheme.

==== Environment and energy ====
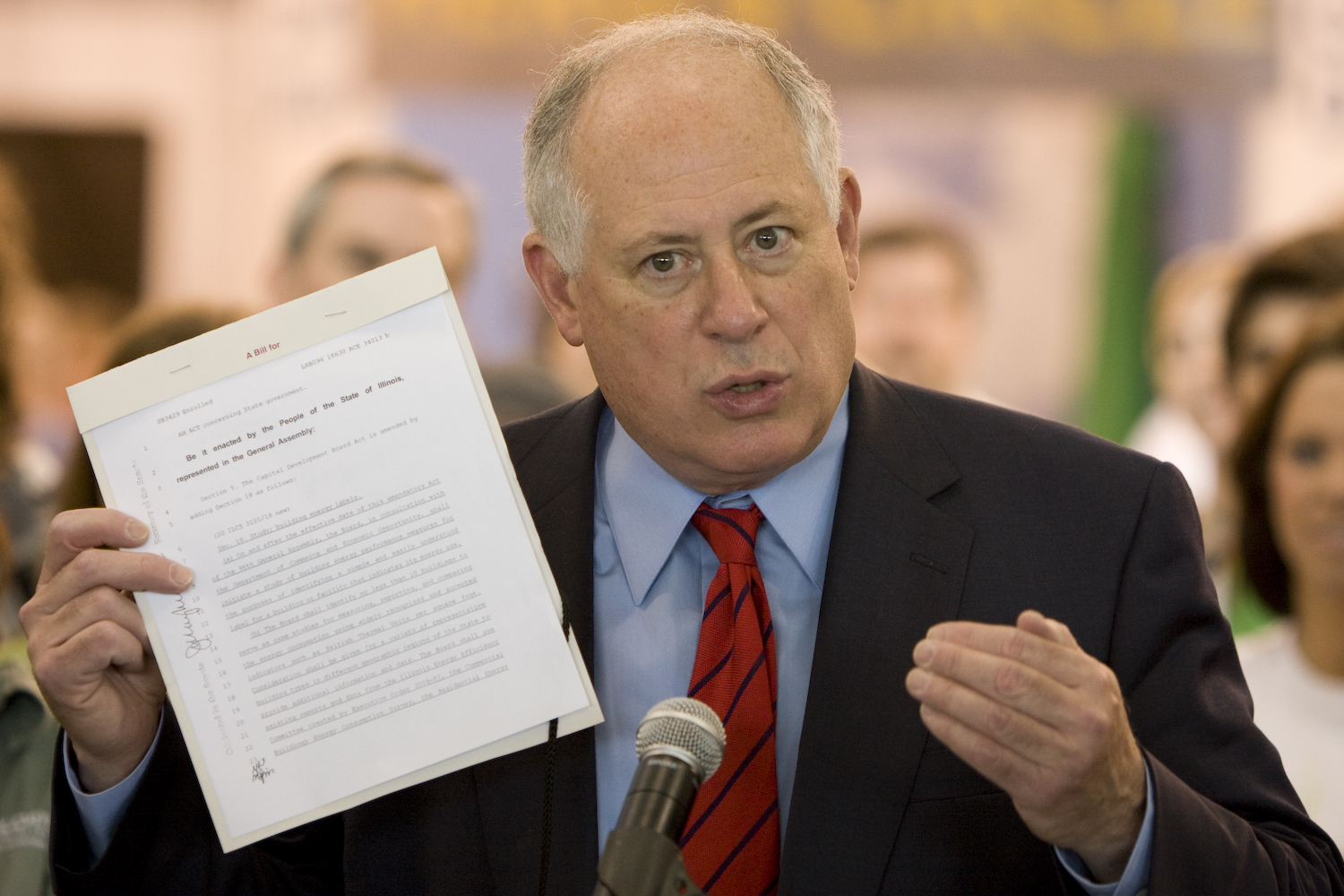
Quinn in May 2010, holding up a bill he signed into law moments before (96th General Assembly, SB 3429), which requires state government to conduct an energy audit of buildings that will be used for future energy efficiency standards.

Shortly after taking office, Quinn reopened seven state parks that had been closed by his predecessor. 44 million citizens visit Illinois state parks and other sites each year, generating an estimated $790 million in overall economic impact in Illinois. Later, Quinn announced the reopening of 11 state historic sites that had been closed by his predecessor, including Frank Lloyd Wright's Dana–Thomas House.

On July 24, 2009, Quinn signed a series of environmental sustainability bills creating the Green Buildings Act to require green practices in state government construction, requiring composting for maintenance of state lands, and focusing on green government. On February 18, 2014, Quinn announced that the U.S. Green Building Council had ranked Illinois number one among all 50 states in the sustainable building design movement, with more than 29 million square feet of certified green buildings, or 2.29 square feet for every resident.

Quinn won generally high praise for his leadership on environmental issues, going back at least as far as when he was lieutenant governor, where he helped develop annual statewide conferences on green building, created a state day to celebrate and defend rivers, and promoted measures such as rain gardens for water conservation. As governor, Quinn helped pass measures on solar and wind energy, including sourcing electricity for the state capitol from wind power, and helped secure funding for high-speed rail in the Midwest corridor. As Governor and Lt. Governor, Quinn chaired the Illinois Green Government Council, a council that focused on greening state government and energy efficiency. The Illinois Green Government Council produced public annual sustainability reports tracking overall state government energy usage, fuel usage, water usage, and waste In 2010 and 2014, the Sierra Club, Illinois's largest environmental group, endorsed Quinn, calling him "The Green Governor."

On October 18, 2012, Quinn was joined by United States Environmental Protection Agency Administrator Lisa P. Jackson, labor leaders, environmental activists, and local government officials to launch a $1 billion Illinois Clean Water Initiative to overhaul Illinois’ aging water infrastructure. Two years later, of communities had secured low-interest loans through the program for drinking and wastewater infrastructure improvements.

==== Death penalty ====
On March 9, 2011, Quinn signed the bill which abolished the death penalty in Illinois. On signing the bill, Quinn stated,

"It is impossible to create a perfect system, one that is free of all mistakes, free of all discrimination with respect to race or economic circumstance or geography. To have a consistent, perfect death penalty system, I have concluded, after looking at everything I've been given, that that's impossible in our state. I think it's the right and just thing to abolish the death penalty."

In an interview with The New York Times, Quinn attributed his decision to the late Cardinal Joseph Bernardin who had argued until the end of his life for a “consistent ethic of life" that included opposing capital punishment. "As time went on it became increasingly clear to me that there were too many problems with the death penalty to keep it on the books,” Quinn said in an interview in 2021.

Though Quinn's successor, Bruce Rauner, campaigned to reenact the death penalty, it remains abolished in Illinois. In 2011, Quinn received the Courageous Leadership Award from Death Penalty Focus.

The decision was supported by many, including the 14th Dalai Lama. In 2025, a 2011 email was unearthed in which Robert F. Prevost, an Illinois resident later elected as Pope Leo XIV, hailed Quinn's decision on abolishing the death penalty:

“Dear Governor Quinn, THANK YOU for your courageous decision in signing into law the elimination of the death penalty. I know it was a difficult decision, but I applaud your vision and your understanding of the very complex matter. You have my full support! Sincerely, Robert F. Prevost.”

Eric Zorn, a columnist for the Chicago Tribune, wrote in 2021, "Now, 10 years on, Quinn’s decision to reject capital punishment is looking increasingly pivotal, more and more like his legacy moment. Yes, it was a somber moment — tragedy, loss and pain suffuse any conversation about the death penalty — but it was also triumphant."

==== Marriage equality ====
In Quinn's 2013 State of the State address, he declared his commitment to the legalization of same sex marriage. After a months-long battle in the legislature, Quinn signed the Religious Freedom and Marriage Fairness Act into law on November 20, 2013, before a crowd of thousands, making Illinois the 16th state in the nation to legalize same-sex marriage. The new law enabled all couples to have access to the same rights, responsibilities, benefits, and protections of civil marriage. It further protected the religious freedom of churches, mosques, synagogues, temples, and other religious organizations.

In November 2013, Patricia Ewert and Vernita Gray became the first same-sex couple to marry in Illinois, months before the June 1, 2014, effective date, as the result of one of the spouses' terminal illness.

Marriage equality became the law nationally as a result of the United States Supreme Court case, Obergefell v. Hodges. However, Illinois had legalized marriage equality already, by legislative action rather than judicial.

A major step towards marriage equality occurred on January 31, 2011, when Quinn signed legislation that legalized civil unions, with access to the full state legal rights and responsibilities enjoyed by couples that are married. Afterwards, more than 6,000 couples from across Illinois joined in a civil union. The marriage equality law in 2013 also allowed the voluntary conversion of a civil union into a marriage.

==== Issues of faith ====
On July 28, 2013, Quinn observed Ramadan by hosting the first-ever Iftar meal in the Illinois Executive Mansion. Quinn continued the Iftar Dinner in 2014. President Thomas Jefferson is credited with hosting the first Iftar meal in the White House when he hosted a Tunisian envoy in 1805. Quinn also joined the Muslim community to observe the completion of the Holy Month of Ramadan at the Eid-ul-Fitr prayer service in Bridgeview, Illinois. During the occasion, the governor renounced recent incidences of violence against Muslim places of worship and signed a new law to foster religious tolerance.

During his tenure as governor, Quinn also supported projects and initiatives significant to Illinois’ Jewish community. In 2009, he joined civic leaders in celebrating the opening of the Illinois Holocaust Museum and Education Center in Skokie, which was built to honor Holocaust survivors and to serve as a center for human rights education. Quinn described the museum as “a beacon of hope” and emphasized its role in combating intolerance. As governor he also issued proclamations marking Holocaust Remembrance Day, advocated interfaith dialogue, and worked with Jewish community leaders on social service and security funding for cultural and religious institutions.^{[2][3]}

==== Military issues ====
Quinn went to grammar school with Congressional Medal of Honor recipient Lester W. Weber, who was killed in action in Vietnam in 1969.

In 2006, then-Lt. Gov. Quinn worked with Rep. Brandon Phelps and Sen. A. J. Wilhelmi to win passage of the Let Them Rest in Peace Act, which established a zone of privacy around Illinois funerals before, during, and after the funeral. Quinn drafted the Let Them Rest in Peace Act after a hate group repeatedly sought to disrupt Illinois military funerals. The bill was later expanded in 2011.

In a proclamation in 2009, Quinn designated the last Sunday of September as Gold Star Mother's Day in Illinois.The Gold Star symbolizes a family member who died in the line of duty while serving in the United States Armed Forces. More than 300 Illinois servicemembers were killed in action since September 11, 2001.

==== Secure Choice Program ====
In January 2015, Governor Quinn signed the Illinois Secure Choice Savings Program Act into law, establishing one of the first state-facilitated automatic individual retirement account (IRA) programs in the United States.

The legislation required private employers that had at least 25 employees, had been in business for two years or more, and did not offer a qualified retirement plan to either sponsor their own plan or facilitate payroll deductions into Secure Choice accounts. By signing the measure, Quinn made Illinois the first state to mandate an “auto-IRA” program for private sector workers without access to employer-sponsored retirement benefits.

The Illinois Secure Choice program automatically enrolls eligible employees into a Roth IRA funded through payroll deductions, with participants able to adjust their contributions, select investment options, or opt out at any time. Employers do not contribute funds, pay fees, or assume fiduciary responsibility; the program is administered through the Office of the Illinois Treasurer, and enforcement of employer compliance is handled by the Illinois Department of Revenue. The law specifies that the program must be self-sustaining, funded by participant fees rather than taxpayer dollars, with costs capped to maintain affordability.

Since its implementation, Secure Choice has expanded in stages to cover smaller employers, eventually lowering the threshold to businesses with five or more employees. As of mid-2025, the program reported more than 157,000 participants and over $250 million saved across more than 27,000 registered employers, reaching workers in all 102 Illinois counties. Independent analysis has suggested that participants in Secure Choice experienced improved financial outcomes, including higher credit scores compared to both those who opted out and Illinois residents overall.

Illinois’ initiative has been widely recognized as a model for other states considering or implementing similar state-run retirement savings programs. Following the passage of Secure Choice, multiple states—including California, Oregon, and Connecticut—adopted comparable auto-IRA frameworks, often citing Illinois’ experience as an example in program design and governance.

=== Gubernatorial elections ===
==== 2010 gubernatorial election ====
In the Democratic primary for governor in 2010, Quinn was challenged by State Comptroller Daniel Hynes, who had held that office since 1999. Following a contentious primary, Quinn defeated Hynes by just under 9,000 votes, with 50.4% of the vote.

While Quinn won the Democratic nomination, the Democratic nomination for Lieutenant Governor went to political unknown Scott Lee Cohen. Illinois law at the time put Cohen's name with Quinn's in the general election. Difficulties in Cohen's personal life, including allegations of domestic violence, quickly came to light, threatening the Democrats' chances (and Quinn's) in the fall. Cohen withdrew from the ballot, which Quinn said was "the right decision for the Democratic Party and the people of Illinois." On March 27, 2010, Illinois Democratic leaders selected Sheila Simon to replace Cohen on the ballot.

Quinn faced Republican Bill Brady in the general election. In April, Cohen announced that he, too, would run for governor, as an independent.

In a year marked by the conservative Tea Party movement, Quinn campaigned on raising Illinois' flat income tax rate, a politically risky move, announcing in March a plan to raise the rate from 3% to 4%. Despite the election campaign for a full term, Quinn said, "Your oath is to the people, not to politics as usual, not to an election year. You’ve got to do hard things."

In the general election Quinn's campaign aired television ads produced by Joe Slade White that repeatedly asked the question of his opponent, "Who is this guy?" Ben Nuckels was the general election Campaign Manager and was named a "Rising Star of Politics" by Campaigns & Elections magazine for his efforts with Quinn.

Despite political statistician Nate Silver giving Quinn a 9.4% chance of winning – in a Republican year, while campaigning on new revenue – Quinn won the general election on November 2, 2010, in one of the top political upsets of the year. Quinn's victory was named by RealClearPolitics.com as the No. 5 General Election upset in the country; Politico said it was the seventh closest gubernatorial election in American history.

A University of Illinois professor said that the election wins in 2010 proved that, "When push comes to shove he has shown himself to be the best closer in Illinois politics."

==== 2014 gubernatorial election ====
In 2012, Quinn stated that he was running for re-election in 2014.

Discussions started to emerge about whether there would be a Democratic primary challenge to Quinn, which the media dubbed a potential "family feud." Quinn said, "I don't believe in family feuds. I like to see families come together."

In the summer of 2013, former White House Chief of Staff and former United States Secretary of Commerce William M. Daley, who had worked for JPMorgan Chase before and after his stints in government, declared a run for governor in the Democratic primary against Quinn.

Despite being the son of longtime Chicago mayors Richard J. Daley and brother of Richard M. Daley, Daley failed to secure support from the Cook County Democratic Party, which slated Quinn.

In an August 2013 interview with the Washington Post, Quinn said of Daley:

“He’s not a reformer. Never has been. He’s not a progressive. Never has been. He’s not an organizer of grass-roots campaigns. Never has been. When you run in Illinois as a Democrat, you’d better be a progressive, you’d better be a reformer and you’d better know how to interact with everyday people. I’ve been doing that for the last 40 years.”

Roughly a month later, on September 16, 2013, Daley dropped out mid-campaign.

Lisa Madigan, the Illinois Attorney General, had also considered challenging Quinn, but announced that she would not run, as her father, Michael Madigan, was still Speaker of the Illinois House: “I feel strongly that the state would not be well-served by having a governor and speaker of the House from the same family and have never planned to run for governor if that would be the case. With Speaker Madigan planning to continue in office, I will not run for governor,” she announced.

Quinn was ultimately challenged in the Democratic primary by Tio Hardiman, the former director of CeaseFire, but won 72% to 28%.

The income tax that was passed in 2011 was set to expire in 2015, and Quinn was once again in the position of advocating for revenue in an election year by making the 5% rate permanent. The plan to maintain the 5% rate was supported by, among others, former Governor Jim Edgar, a Republican. He also proposed a $500 property tax rebate to help property taxpayers.

Quinn faced Republican businessman Bruce Rauner in the general election. Rauner injected a record amount of his own money into the race, and campaigned on allowing the income tax to expire and curbing the power of labor unions like the American Federation of State, County and Municipal Employees. Rauner meanwhile faced allegations that he had engaged in pay-to-play to get his daughter into Walter Payton College Preparatory High School, and that as a businessman, he had threatened a female CEO. Journalist Dave McKinney resigned from the Chicago Sun-Times after the Rauner campaign sent an opposition research file to the Sun-Times editors in an effort to quash the story, and McKinney was put on "house arrest" by the paper.

Quinn was defeated by Rauner in the general election, 50% to 46%.

== Post-gubernatorial activities ==
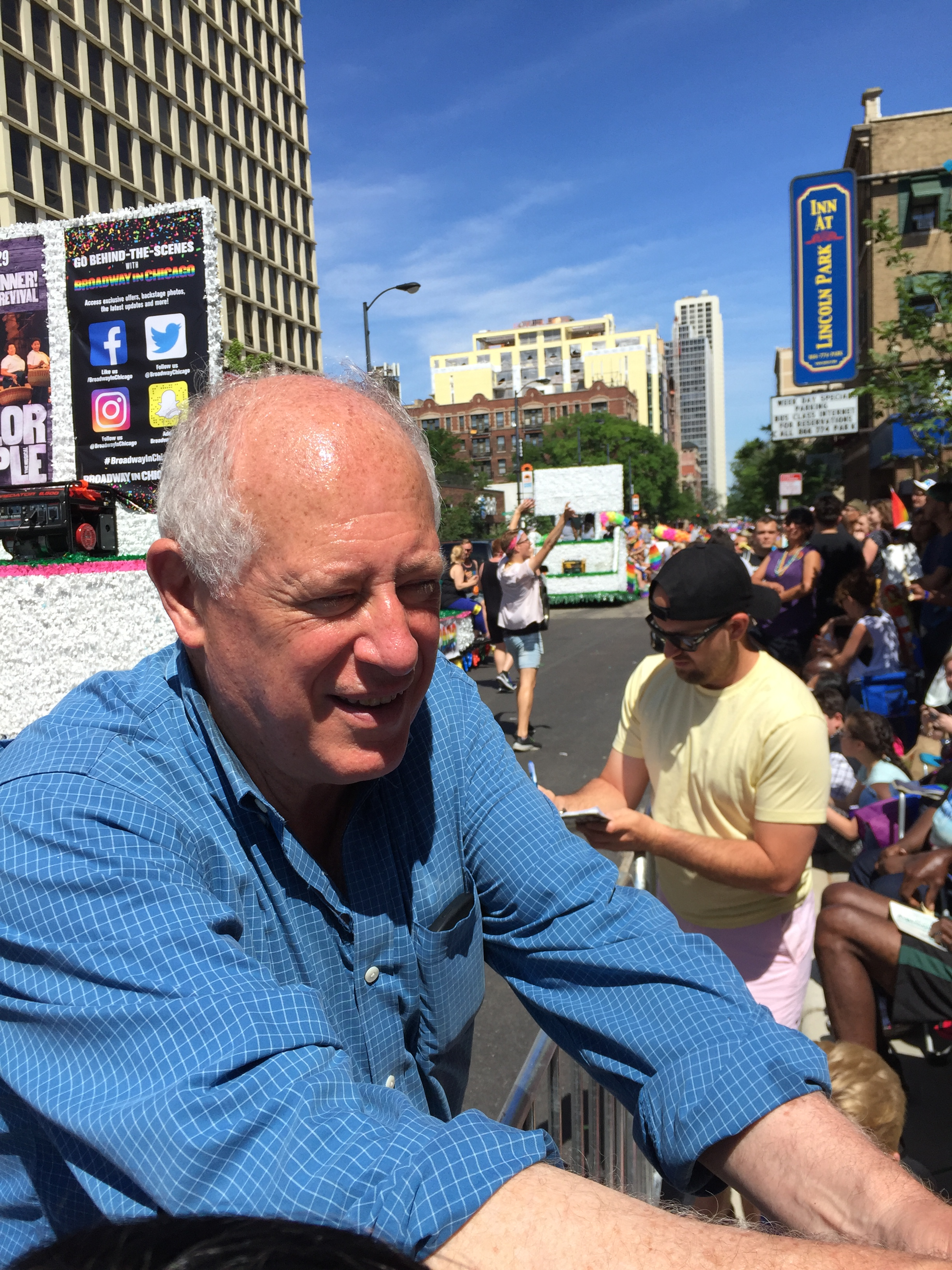
Quinn at the 2018 Chicago Pride Parade, June 2018

Since leaving office, Quinn has worked on a variety of policy issues. He has continued to support veterans and raise awareness for service members and their families through the Portrait of a Soldier exhibit honoring the more than 300 Illinois service members, which he has had displayed across the state.

Quinn donated his personal papers, including a large number related to individuals killed in action from Illinois since the September 11 attacks, to Northwestern University.

In 2024, Quinn discovered that the Illinois General Assembly had quietly stopped scaling the standard exemption to inflation, essentially a backdoor tax hike. The practice was later reinstated as a result of Quinn's efforts. In the same year, Quinn publicly opposed efforts to provide taxpayer dollars to private sports stadiums, calling for a referendum on the issue and getting a referendum question on the issue on the ballot in eight precincts in Chicago, including his house and the house of stadium advocate Mayor Brandon Johnson. Residents agreed with Quinn, with approximately 80% voting no on the referendum.

=== Take Charge Chicago and Swart v. City of Chicago ===
In June 2016, Quinn announced Take Charge Chicago, a new petition drive to put term limits on Chicago's mayor (the only city out of the ten largest in the country to not have term limits) and create a new Consumer Advocate position in Chicago. At the time, Rahm Emanuel was actively considering a third term for Mayor of Chicago.

Quinn submitted 86,481 signatures in August 2018, in excess of the legal requirement of 52,533. Despite a fierce objection from Emanuel's campaign, the Electoral Board found sufficient number of signatures later in August, and days later Emanuel announced his decision to no longer seek a third term.

==== Swart v. City of Chicago ====
While circulating petitions for Take Charge Chicago, several circulators were harassed in Millennium Park in Chicago by security personnel hired by the city. In October 2019, Quinn represented Take Charge Chicago petition circulators in federal court when they joined Swart v. City of Chicago, a case brought by students from Wheaton College who had been similarly removed from proselytizing.

Quinn, Ed Mullen, and John Mauck, the attorney for the students from Wheaton College, alleged that Chicago had deprived their clients of their rights under the First Amendment, and that Millennium Park is a traditional public forum, a property that is open to public expression and assembly. Judge John Robert Blakey found in favor of the petition passers, writing that "the City's restrictions prohibit reasonable forms of expression in large areas of the Park," and continuing:

Although the City insists a curated design divests the Park of its traditional public nature, this Court cannot accept this characterization based upon the facts here. Indeed, if a “curated design” were enough to transform the nature of the forum, any park with a statue could lose its First Amendment protections. The law precludes this absurd result.

As a result, the City was required to allow First Amendment activities, such as petition passing, in Millennium Park. Quinn later successfully represented individuals attempting to circulate petitions in other public city properties, including Daley Civic Center Plaza for Christmas markets.

==== Other legal cases ====
Quinn also represented a number of individuals in Morgan v. White and Morgan v. State Board of Elections, two cases during the COVID-19 pandemic to require the allowance of electronic signatures for the passing of petitions, which would allow for social distancing as well as allow additional access for people with disabilities.

Quinn joined, as the lead plaintiff, a lawsuit for an elected school board in Chicago, Quinn v. Board of Education of the City of Chicago.

=== 2018 attorney general campaign ===
On October 27, 2017, Quinn announced he would run for Illinois Attorney General in the 2018 election. His campaign focused on ethics reform (particularly with regard to utility companies and red light camera operators), consumer rights and protections, protecting access to healthcare, and combating federal actions by the Trump administration. Kwame Raoul won the eight-person primary on March 20, 2018, with 30.17% (390,472 votes), and Quinn placed second with 27.23% (352,425 votes), winning most of Illinois' 102 counties. Raoul went on to defeat Erika Harold in the November election.

=== Millionaire Amendment ===
In 2024, at Quinn's urging, an advisory referendum for a millionaire amendment – a surcharge on income over a million dollars, to be used for property tax relief, and inspired by Quinn's 2014 ballot – passed with a healthy margin. In 2026, a proposed constitutional amendment for a similar proposal, authored by Quinn and others, passed an Illinois House committee but the House ran out of time before the deadline for it to appear on the ballot. The proposal, which calls for the revenue to be used for property tax relief and education, will appear on the ballot in Cook County in 2026.

== Electoral history ==
=== For Illinois Attorney General ===
Democratic primary results, 2018
Party	Candidate	Votes	%
Democratic	Kwame Raoul	374,667	30.2
Democratic	Pat Quinn	340,163	27.4
Democratic	Sharon Fairley	156,070	12.6
Democratic	Nancy Rotering	115,974	9.3
Democratic	Scott Drury	98,246	7.9
Democratic	Jesse Ruiz	67,706	5.5
Democratic	Renato Mariotti	49,891	4.0
Democratic	Aaron Goldstein	37,987	3.1
Total votes		1,159,701	100

=== As Governor of Illinois (with Lt. Governor) ===
==== 2014 ====
Illinois gubernatorial election, 2014
Party	Candidate	Votes	%
Republican	Bruce Rauner/Evelyn Sanguinetti	1,823,627	50.27
Democratic	Pat Quinn/Paul Vallas (Incumbent)	1,681,343	46.35
Libertarian	Chad Grimm/Alex Cummings	121,534	3.35
Write-In	Various candidates	1,186	0.03
Majority		142,284	3.92%
Total votes		3,627,690	100
Republican gain from Democratic			

Democratic primary results
Party	Candidate	Votes	%
Democratic	Pat Quinn (Incumbent)	321,818	71.94
Democratic	Tio Hardiman	125,500	28.06
Total votes		447,318	100

==== 2010 ====
Illinois gubernatorial election, 2010
Party	Candidate	Votes	%	±%
Democratic	Pat Quinn (Incumbent)	1,745,219	46.79%	−3.00%
Republican	Bill Brady	1,713,385	45.94%	+6.68%
Independent	Scott Lee Cohen	135,705	3.64%	
Green	Rich Whitney	100,756	2.70%	−7.66%
Libertarian	Lex Green	34,681	0.93%	
Majority		31,834	0.85%	−9.68%
Turnout		3,729,989		
Democratic hold		Swing		

Democratic primary results
Party	Candidate	Votes	%
Democratic	Pat Quinn (Incumbent)	462,049	50.46
Democratic	Dan Hynes	453,677	49.54
Total votes		915,726	100.00

=== As Lt. Governor (with Governor) ===
- 2006 Election for Governor/Lieutenant Governor of Illinois
  - Rod Blagojevich/Pat Quinn (D) (inc.), 49.79%
  - Judy Baar Topinka/Joe Birkett (R), 39.26%
  - Rich Whitney/Julie Samuels (Green), 10.36%
- 2002 Election for Governor / Lieutenant Governor
  - Rod Blagojevich/Pat Quinn (D), 52%
  - Jim Ryan/Carl Hawkinson (R), 45%

=== For United States Senate ===
Democratic primary results
Party	Candidate	Votes	%
Democratic	Dick Durbin	512,520	64.87%
Democratic	Pat Quinn	233,138	29.51%
Democratic	Ronald F. Gibbs	17,681	2.24%
Democratic	Jalil Ahmad	17,211	2.18%
Democratic	Paul H. D. Park	9,505	1.20%
Total votes		790,055	100

=== For Illinois Secretary of State ===
==== General election ====
Secretary of State election
Party	Candidate	Votes	%
Republican	George H. Ryan (incumbent)	1,868,144	60.48
Democratic	Pat Quinn	1,182,629	38.29
Libertarian	Joseph Schreiner	38,074	1.23
Total votes		3,088,847	100

==== Democratic primary ====
Secretary of State Democratic primary
Party	Candidate	Votes	%
Democratic	Pat Quinn	641,787	70.54
Democratic	Denny Jacobs	141,058	15.51
Democratic	Rose-Marie Love	126,939	13.95
Total votes		909,784	100

=== For state treasurer ===
1990 Treasurer general election
Party	Candidate	Votes	%
Democratic	Patrick Quinn	1,740,742	55.70
Republican	Greg Baise	1,384,492	44.30
Write-in	Paul Salander	55	0.00
Total votes		3,125,289	100

1990 Treasurer Democratic primary
Party	Candidate	Votes	%
Democratic	Patrick Quinn	449,442	51.12
Democratic	Peg McDonnell Breslin	429,810	48.88
Total votes		879,252	100

1986 Treasurer Democratic primary
Party	Candidate	Votes	%
Democratic	Jerry Cosentino	241,006	30.22
Democratic	James H. Donnewald (incumbent)	235,052	29.47
Democratic	Patrick Quinn	208,775	26.18
Democratic	Robert D. Hart	112,645	14.13
Write-in	Others	1	0.00
Total votes		797,478	100

Party political offices
Preceded by Jerome Cosentino	Democratic nominee for Treasurer of Illinois; 1990	Succeeded by Nancy Drew Sheehan
Preceded by Jerome Cosentino	Democratic nominee for Secretary of State of Illinois; 1994	Succeeded by Jesse White
Preceded by Mary Lou Kearns	Democratic nominee for Lieutenant Governor of Illinois; 2002, 2006	Succeeded by Sheila Simon
Preceded by Rod Blagojevich	Democratic nominee for Governor of Illinois; 2010, 2014	Succeeded by J. B. Pritzker
Political offices
Preceded by Jerome Cosentino	Treasurer of Illinois; 1991–1995	Succeeded by Judy Topinka
Preceded by Corinne Wood	Lieutenant Governor of Illinois; 2003–2009	Succeeded by Sheila Simon
Preceded by Rod Blagojevich	Governor of Illinois; 2009–2015	Succeeded by Bruce Rauner
U.S. order of precedence (ceremonial)
Preceded by Rod Blagojevich as Former Governor	Order of precedence of the United States	Succeeded by Bruce Rauner as Former Governor
