= 1988 Cook County, Illinois, elections =

- November 8, 1988
- Turnout: 72.56%

The Cook County, Illinois, general election was held on November 8, 1988.

Primaries were held March 15, 1988.

Elections were held for Clerk of the Circuit Court, Recorder of Deeds, State's Attorney, one seat on the Cook County Board of Appeals, three seats on the Water Reclamation District Board, and judgeships on the Circuit Court of Cook County.

== Election information ==
1988 was a presidential election year in the United States. The primaries and general elections for Cook County races coincided with those for federal races (President and House) and those for state elections.

=== Political context ===
After Harold Washington's 1987 re-election as Chicago mayor and the end of the Council Wars gridlock on the Chicago City Council, Washington reconciled with the Cook County Regular Democratic Organization. Before his death in November 1987, he endorsed the regular organization's slate of candidates for Cook County office in 1988 (Richard M. Daley for re-election as state's attorney; Aurelia Pucinski for clerk of courts; and Carol Moseley-Braun for recorder of deeds).

=== Voter turnout ===
==== Primary election ====
Turnout in the primaries was 45.63%, with 1,236,750 ballots cast.

Vote totals of primaries
Primary	Chicago vote totals	Suburban Cook County vote totals	Total Cook County vote totals
Democratic	742,281	244,812	987,093
Republican	83,625	161,042	244,667
Illinois Solidarity	127	77	204
Nonpartisan	733	6,053	6,786
Total	826,766	411,984	1,236,750

==== General election ====
The general election saw turnout of 72.56%, with 2,095,985 ballots cast. Chicago saw 1,14,080 ballots cast, and suburban Cook County saw 981,905 ballots cast.

=== Straight-ticket voting ===
Ballots had a straight-ticket voting option in 1988.

Party	Number of straight-ticket votes
Democratic	442,219
Republican	276,923
Communist	102
Illinois Solidarity	508
John Davis Comm. Act.	0
Independent Tax Reform	974
Independent Progressive	0
Libertarian	1,531
Marie Goodlow Party	348

== Clerk of the Circuit Court ==
1988 Clerk of the Circuit Court of Cook County election
- November 8, 1988
- Turnout: 68.25%
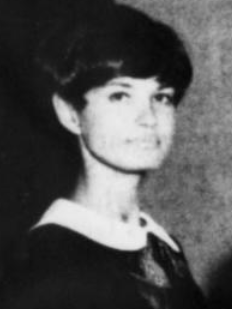

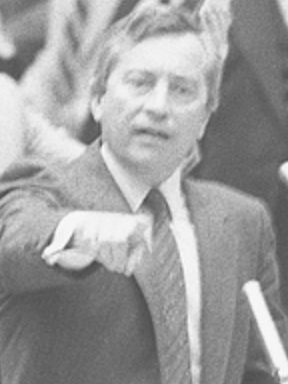
Candidate	Aurelia Pucinski	Edward R. Vrdolyak
Party	Democratic	Republican
Popular vote	1,170,558	800,783
Percentage	59.38%	40.62%
Clerk before election
Morgan M. Finley
Democratic
Elected Clerk
Aurelia Pucinski
Democratic

In the 1988 Clerk of the Circuit Court of Cook County election, incumbent clerk Morgan M. Finley, a Democrat, did not seek reelection. Democrat Aurelia Pucinski was elected to succeed him.

=== Primaries ===
==== Democratic ====
Candidates

The following candidates ran for the Democratic Party nomination for Clerk of the Circuit Court:

Candidate	Experience	Ref
Jane Byrne	Former mayor of Chicago (1979–1983)	
Thomas S. Fuller	Commissioner of the Metropolitan Water Reclamation District of Greater Chicago since 1978	
Janice Hart	1984 Democratic nominee for Illinois Secretary of State, supporter of the LaRouche movement	
Aurelia Pucinski	Commissioner of the Metropolitan Water Reclamation District of Greater Chicago since 1984	

Results

Clerk of the Circuit Court of Cook County Democratic primary
Party	Candidate	Votes	%
Democratic	Aurelia Marie Pucinski	407,958	51.96
Democratic	Jane M. Byrne	296,298	37.74
Democratic	Thomas S. Fuller	60,863	7.75
Democratic	Janice A. Hart	20,061	2.55
Total votes		785,180	100

==== Republican ====
Candidate

The following candidate ran for the Republican Party nomination for Clerk of the Circuit Court:

Candidate	Experience	Ref
Edward Vrdolyak	Former Chicago alderman (1971–1987), former president of the Chicago City Council (1977–1983), former Chairman of the Cook County Democratic Party (1982–1987), 1987 Illinois Solidarity Party nominee for mayor of Chicago	

Results

Clerk of the Circuit Court of Cook County Republican primary
Party	Candidate	Votes	%
Republican	Edward R. Vrdolyak	191,798	100
Total votes		191,798	100

==== Illinois Solidarity ====
No candidates ran in the Illinois Solidarity Party primary.

=== General election ===
Clerk of the Circuit Court of Cook County election
Party	Candidate	Votes	%
Democratic	Aurelia Marie Pucinski	1,170,558	59.38
Republican	Edward R. Vrdolyak	800,783	40.62
Total votes		1,971,341	100

== Recorder of Deeds ==
1988 Cook County Recorder of Deeds election
- November 8, 1988
- Turnout: 65.06%
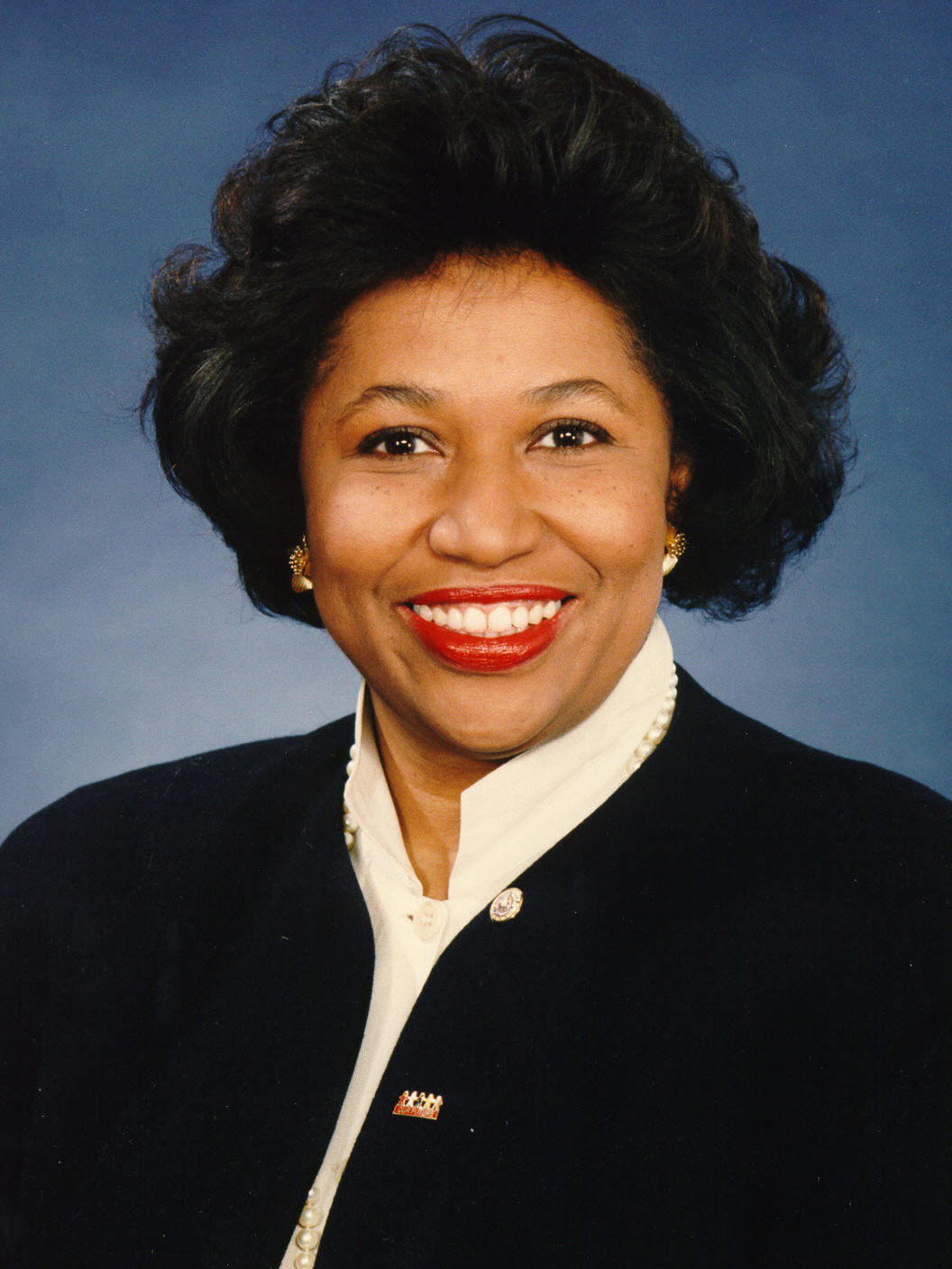

Candidate	Carol Moseley Braun	Bernard L. Stone
Party	Democratic	Republican
Popular vote	1,020,805	795,540
Percentage	54.32%	42.33%
Recorder of Deeds before election
Harry Yourell
Democratic
Elected Recorder of Deeds
Carol Moseley Braun
Democratic

In the 1988 Cook County Recorder of Deeds election, incumbent first-term recorder of deeds Harry Yourell, a Democrat, did not seek reelection, instead running to be a commissioner of the Metropolitan Water Reclamation District of Greater Chicago. Democrat Carol Moseley Braun was elected to succeed him.

Mosely Braun's election made her the first African-American to hold the office of Cook County recorder of deeds.

=== Primaries ===
==== Democratic ====
Candidates

The following candidate ran for the Democratic Party nomination for Cook County Recorder of Deeds Court:

Candidate	Experience	Ref
Sheila A. Jones	Perennial candidate	
Carol Moseley Braun	Member of the Illinois House of Representatives since 1979	

Results

Cook County Recorder of Deeds Democratic primary
Party	Candidate	Votes	%
Democratic	Carol Moseley Braun	424,480	78.05
Democratic	Sheila A. Jones	119,372	21.95
Total votes		543,852	100

==== Republican ====
Candidates

The following candidate ran for the Democratic Party nomination for Cook County Recorder of Deeds Court:

Candidate	Experience	Ref
Maureen Murphy	Worth Township Clerk	
Bernard Stone	Chicago alderman since 1973	

Results

Cook County Recorder of Deeds Republican primary
Party	Candidate	Votes	%
Republican	Bernard L. Stone	114,985	59.31
Republican	Maureen Murphy	78,895	40.69
Total votes		193,880	100

==== Illinois Solidarity ====
No candidates ran in the Illinois Solidarity Party primary. The party ultimately nominated Edward M. Wojkowski.

=== General election ===
Cook County Recorder of Deeds election
Party	Candidate	Votes	%
Democratic	Carol Moseley Braun	1,020,805	54.32
Republican	Bernard L. Stone	795,540	42.33
Illinois Solidarity	Edward M. Wojkowski	62,968	3.35
Total votes		1,879,313	100

== State's Attorney ==
1988 Cook County State's Attorney election
- November 8, 1988
- Turnout: 67.68%
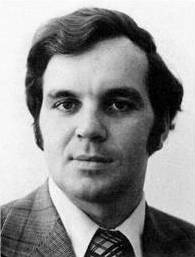

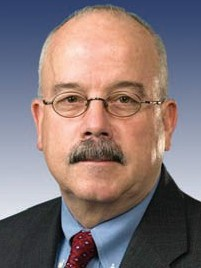
Candidate	Richard M. Daley	Terrance Gainer
Party	Democratic	Republican
Popular vote	1,303,906	650,942
Percentage	66.70%	33.30%
State's Attorney before election
Richard M. Daley
Democratic
Elected State's Attorney
Richard M. Daley
Democratic

In the 1988 Cook County State's Attorney election, incumbent second-term state's attorney Richard M. Daley, a Democrat, was reelected.

=== Primaries ===
==== Democratic ====
Cook County State's Attorney Democratic primary
Party	Candidate	Votes	%
Democratic	Richard M. Daley (incumbent)	641,789	100
Total votes		641,789	100

==== Republican ====
Cook County State's Attorney Republican primary
Party	Candidate	Votes	%
Republican	Terrance Gainer	177,879	100
Total votes		177,879	100

==== Illinois Solidarity ====
No candidates ran in the Illinois Solidarity Party primary.

=== General election ===
Cook County State's Attorney election
Party	Candidate	Votes	%
Democratic	Richard M. Daley (incumbent)	1,303,906	66.70
Republican	Terrance Gainer	650,942	33.30
Total votes		1,954,848	100

== Cook County Board of Appeals (special election) ==
1988 Cook County Board of Appeals special election
- November 8, 1988

1 of 2 seats on the Cook County Board of Appeals
- Turnout: 65.27%
	First party	Second party
Party	Democratic	Republican
Seats before	2	0
Seats after	2	0
Seat change	Steady	Steady
Seats up	1	0
Races won	1	0

1988 Cook County, Illinois, elections
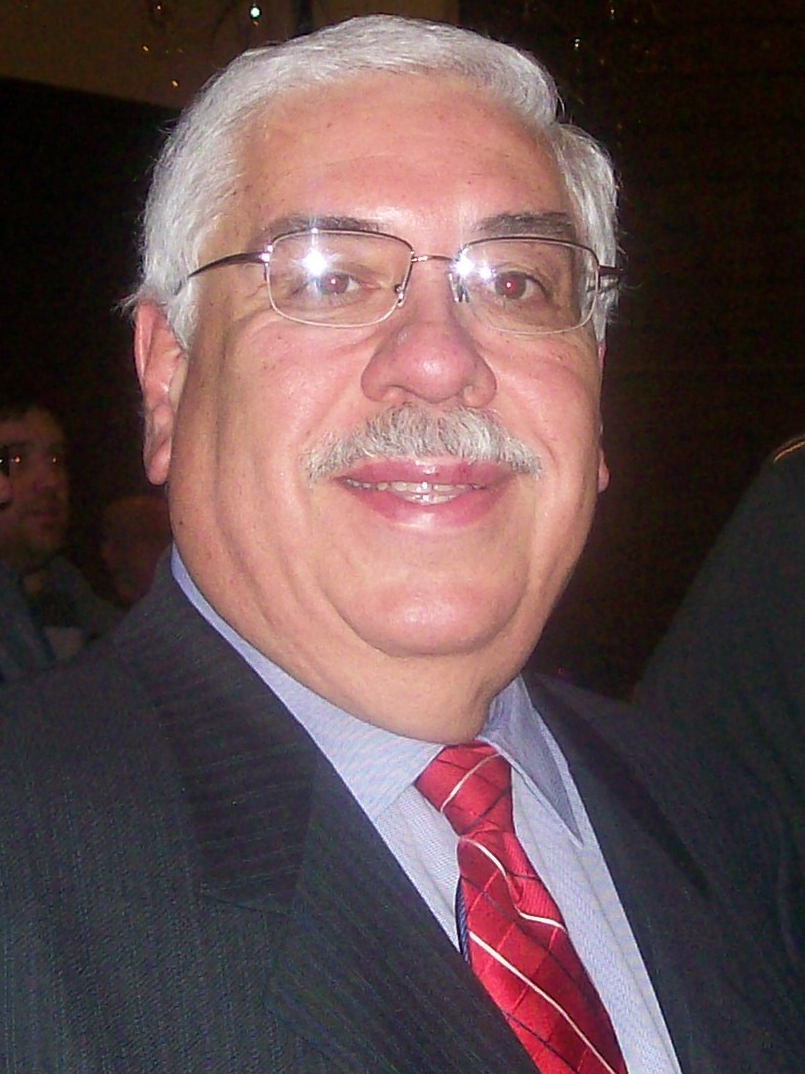

Candidate	Joseph Berrios	David R. Wiltise
Party	Democratic	Republican
Popular vote	1,170,558	714,736
Percentage	60.68%	39.32%
Commissioner before election
Thomas A. Jaconetty
Democratic
Elected Commissioner
Joseph Berrios
Democratic

In the 1988 Cook County Board of Appeals special election, one seat on the board were up for election. Due to the death of Harry Semrow, this special election was held to fill the seat he had served on. Democrat Joseph Berrios was elected to fill the seat.

Thomas A. Jaconetty had been appointed to hold the seat until the new commissioner elected in this race would be seated.

=== Primaries ===
==== Democratic ====
31st Ward committeeman Joseph Berrios, the Democratic Party organization-endorsed candidate, won the Democratic primary.

Cook County Board of Appeals Democratic primary
Party	Candidate	Votes	%
Democratic	Joseph Berrios	302,253	54.47
Democratic	Jeffrey Paul Smith	252,633	45.53
Total votes		554,886	100

==== Republican ====
The Republican Party nominated David R. Wiltse, an attorney who had worked in various positions for the state of Illinois and at the time of the election was a special assistant attorney general representing the Illinois Lottery. After losing the general election, Wiltse would remain in that office until 1994. In 1993, he began working as the city attorney of Des Plaines, an office he would hold until retiring in 2012. Wiltse would later run unsuccessfully for judgeships on the Cook County Circuit Court in 1998 and 2001.

Cook County Board of Appeals Republican primary
Party	Candidate	Votes	%
Republican	David R. Wiltse	154,447	100
Total votes		154,447	100

==== Illinois Solidarity ====
No candidates ran in the Illinois Solidarity Party primary.

=== General election ===
Cook County Board of Appeals Democratic primary
Party	Candidate	Votes	%
Democratic	Joseph Berrios	1,170,558	60.68
Republican	David R. Wiltse	714,736	39.32
Total votes		1,885,294	100

== Water Reclamation District Board ==
1988 Metropolitan Water Reclamation District of Greater Chicago election
- November 8, 1988

3 of 9 seats on the Metropolitan Water Reclamation District of Greater Chicago

In the 1988 Metropolitan Water Reclamation District of Greater Chicago election, three of the nine seats on the Metropolitan Water Reclamation District of Greater Chicago board were up for election in an at-large election. All three Democratic nominees won.

== Judicial elections ==
Pasrtisan elections were held for judgeships on the Circuit Court of Cook County due to vacancies. Retention elections were also held for the Circuit Court.

== Other elections ==
Coinciding with the primaries, elections were held to elect the Democratic, Republican, and Illinois Solidarity committeemen for the wards of Chicago.

== See also ==
- 1988 Illinois elections
