= 1984 Cook County, Illinois, elections =

- November 6, 1984
- Turnout: 78.76%

The Cook County, Illinois, general election was held on November 6, 1984.

Primaries were held March 20, 1984.

Elections were held for Clerk of the Circuit Court, Recorder of Deeds, State's Attorney, 4 seats on the Water Reclamation District Board, and judgeships on the Circuit Court of Cook County.

== Election information ==
1984 was a presidential election year in the United States. The primaries and general elections for Cook County races coincided with those for federal races (President, Senate, and House) and those for state elections.

=== Voter turnout ===
==== Primary election ====
Voter turnout in Cook County during the primaries was 46.94%

Chicago saw 58.55% turnout, and suburban Cook County saw 31.99% turnout.

Vote totals of primaries
Primary	Chicago vote totals	Suburban Cook County vote totals	Total Cook County vote totals
Democratic	878,243	257,169	1,135,412
Republican	35,966	126,181	162,147
Citizens	241	0	241
Nonpartisan	0	4,348	4,348
Total	914,450	387,698	1,302,148

==== General election ====
Turnout in the general election was 78.76%, with 2,262,103 ballots cast. Chicago saw 78.23% turnout (with 1,247,630 ballots cast), and suburban Cook County saw 79.42% turnout (with 1,014,473 ballots cast).

=== Straight-ticket voting ===
Ballots had a straight-ticket voting option in 1988.

Party	Number of straight-ticket votes
Democratic	146,961
Republican	249,150
Citizens	75
Communist	128
Jesse Butler Progressive	199
Libertarian	883
Socialist Workers	134

== Clerk of the Circuit Court ==
1984 Clerk of the Circuit Court of Cook County election
- November 6, 1984
- Turnout: 71.55%
Candidate	Morgan M. Finley	Deborah L. Murphy
Party	Democratic	Republican
Popular vote	1,260,257	794,882
Percentage	61.32%	38.68%
Clerk before election
Morgan M. Finley
Democratic
Elected Clerk
Morgan M. Finley
Democratic

In the 1984 Clerk of the Circuit Court of Cook County election, incumbent clerk Morgan M. Finley, a Democrat first appointed in 1974, was reelected.

=== Primaries ===
==== Democratic ====
Clerk of the Circuit Court of Cook County Democratic primary
Party	Candidate	Votes	%
Democratic	Morgan M. Finley	691,037	100
Total votes		691,037	100

==== Republican ====
Clerk of the Circuit Court of Cook County Republican primary
Party	Candidate	Votes	%
Republican	Deborah L. Murphy	123,290	100
Total votes		123,290	100

=== General election ===
Clerk of the Circuit Court of Cook County election
Party	Candidate	Votes	%
Democratic	Morgan M. Finley	1,260,257	61.32
Republican	Deborah L. Murphy	794,882	38.68
Total votes		2,055,139	100

== Recorder of Deeds ==
1984 Cook County Recorder of Deeds election
- November 6, 1984
- Turnout: 70.41%
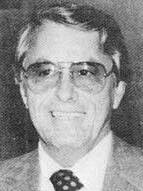

Candidate	Harry Yourell	Paul M. Sengpiehl
Party	Democratic	Republican
Popular vote	1,232,485	789,906
Percentage	60.94%	39.06%
Recorder of Deeds before election
Sid Olsen
Democratic
Elected Recorder of Deeds
Harry Yourell
Democratic

In the 1988 Cook County Recorder of Deeds election, incumbent second-term recorder of deeds Sid Olsen, a Democrat, did not seek reelection. Democrat Harry Yourell was elected to succeed him.

=== Primaries ===
==== Democratic ====
Cook County Recorder of Deeds Democratic primary
Party	Candidate	Votes	%
Democratic	Harry "Bus" Yourell	368,040	50.24
Democratic	David W. Gleicher	364,457	49.76
Total votes		732,497	100

==== Republican ====
Cook County Recorder of Deeds Republican primary
Party	Candidate	Votes	%
Republican	Paul M. Sengpiehl	72,400	58.84
Republican	William B. Shlifka	50,649	41.16
Total votes		123,049	100

=== General election ===
Cook County Recorder of Deeds election
Party	Candidate	Votes	%
Democratic	Harry "Bus" Yourell	1,232,485	60.94
Republican	Paul M. Sengpiehl	789,906	39.06
Total votes		2,022,391	100

== State's Attorney ==
1984 Cook County State's Attorney election
- November 6, 1984
- Turnout: 74.87%
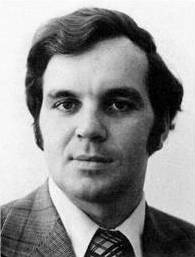

Candidate	Richard M. Daley	Richard J. Brzeczek
Party	Democratic	Republican
Popular vote	1,418,775	731,634
Percentage	65.98%	34.02%
State's Attorney before election
Richard M. Daley
Democratic
Elected State's Attorney
Richard M. Daley
Democratic

In the 1984 Cook County State's Attorney election, incumbent first-term state's attorney Richard M. Daley, a Democrat, was reelected.

=== Primaries ===
==== Democratic ====
Cook County State’s Attorney Democratic primary
Party	Candidate	Votes	%
Democratic	Richard M. Daley (incumbent)	629,743	63.86
Democratic	Lawrence S. Bloom	356,381	36.14
Total votes		986,124	100

==== Republican ====
Former superintendent of the Chicago Police Department Richard J. Brzeczek won the Republican primary, running unopposed.

Cook County State’s Attorney Republican primary
Party	Candidate	Votes	%
Republican	Richard J. Brzeczek	135,852	100
Total votes		135,852	100

=== General election ===
Cook County State’s Attorney election
Party	Candidate	Votes	%
Democratic	Richard M. Daley (incumbent)	1,418,775	65.98
Republican	Richard J. Brzeczek	731,634	34.02
Total votes		2,150,409	100

== Water Reclamation District Board ==
1984 Metropolitan Water Reclamation District of Greater Chicago election
- November 6, 1984

4 of 9 seats on the Metropolitan Water Reclamation District of Greater Chicago

In the 1988 Metropolitan Water Reclamation District of Greater Chicago election, four of the nine seats on the Metropolitan Water Reclamation District of Greater Chicago board were up for election. Three were regularly scheduled elections, and one was a special election due to a vacancy.

Democrats won all four seats up for election.

== Judicial elections ==
Pasrtisan elections were held for judgeships on the Circuit Court of Cook County due to vacancies. Retention elections were also held for the Circuit Court.

== Other elections ==
Coinciding with the primaries, elections were held to elect the Democratic, Republican, and Citizens committeemen for the wards of Chicago.

== See also ==
- 1984 Illinois elections
