= 1986 Illinois gubernatorial election =

- November 4, 1986
- Turnout: 52.37% ▼9.21 pp
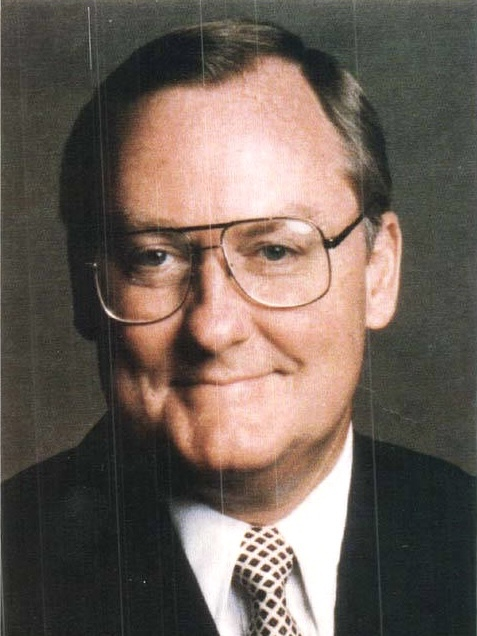

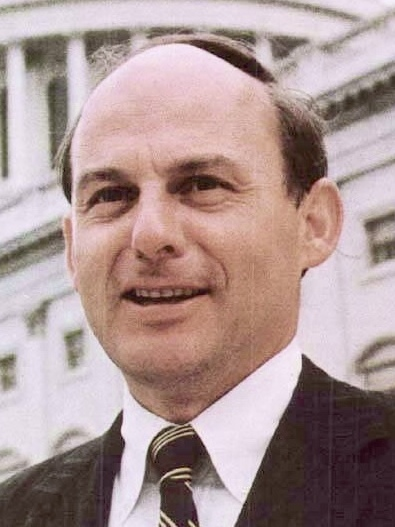

Nominee	Jim Thompson	Adlai Stevenson III	No nominee
Party	Republican	Illinois Solidarity	Democratic
Running mate	George Ryan	Mike Howlett	Mark Fairchild
Popular vote	1,655,849	1,256,626	208,830
Percentage	52.67%	39.97%	6.64%
- Thompson: 40–50% 50–60% 60–70% 70–80% 80–90% Stevenson: 40–50% 50–60% 60–70% 70–80% 80–90% Tie: 30–40% 40–50%
Governor before election
James R. Thompson
Republican
Elected Governor
James R. Thompson
Republican

The 1986 Illinois gubernatorial election was held on November 4, 1986. Republican candidate James R. Thompson won a fourth term in office, defeating the Illinois Solidarity Party nominee, former United States Senator Adlai Stevenson III, by around 400,000 votes.

Stevenson, a Democrat, originally ran for and received that party's gubernatorial nomination. However, his preferred candidate lost the lieutenant gubernatorial nomination to Mark J. Fairchild in the primary (primaries for both major parties were held March 18, 1986). When it came out after the primary that Fairchild was a member of the LaRouche movement, Stevenson withdrew from the Democratic gubernatorial ticket to avoid running with Fairchild. At that time in Illinois, the governor and lieutenant governor were nominated in separate primaries, but ran as a single ticket in the general election. Stevenson formed the third party Solidarity Party and ran as its candidate with Mike Howlett as his running mate.

Virtually the entire Democratic establishment supported Stevenson's bid. The "official" Democratic ticket, ultimately running Fairchild on the ballot alone as a lieutenant gubernatorial nominee without a gubernatorial nominee atop the ticket, only just managed to surpass the 5% mark needed for the party to retain their major party status in Illinois after the election.

== Background ==
The primaries and general elections coincided with those for federal offices (Senate and House), as well as those for other state offices. The election was part of the 1986 Illinois elections.

The primaries saw turnout of 21.10% in the gubernatorial primaries, with 1,289,162 votes cast, and turnout of 18.01% in the lieutenant gubernatorial primaries, with 1,100,110 votes cast.

Turnout during the general election was 52.37%, with 3,143,978 votes cast.

== Democratic primary ==
Adlai Stevenson III won a comfortable victory in the primary over perennial candidate Larry Burgess. Originally, Attorney General Neil Hartigan had declared himself a candidate for governor. However, soon after Stevenson announced his intention to run as well, Hartigan opted to run for reelection as Illinois Attorney General instead.

As a result of Stevenson's primary victory, the 1986 election was a rematch of the 1982 election, which had been narrowly won by Thompson over Adlai Stevenson III by about 5,000 votes out of over 3.5 million votes cast. However, Stevenson's efforts were largely derailed in the primary when the candidates he supported for Lieutenant Governor (George Sangmeister) and Secretary of State (Aurelia Pucinski) were both upset by Mark J. Fairchild and Janice Hart.

While not heavily publicized during the primaries, Fairchild and Hart were followers of the controversial Lyndon LaRouche. When this became public knowledge after the primaries, Stevenson was forced to abandon his Democratic Party nomination and run as a third-party candidate. As of 2024, this remains the last time a third-party candidate finished in the top two in the Illinois governor's race.

Stevenson made it clear right after learning his running mate was to be a LaRouche supporter that he would "never run on a ticket with candidates who espouse the hate-filled folly of Lyndon LaRouche".

=== Governor ===
==== Candidates ====
- Adlai Stevenson III, former U.S. Senator from Illinois (1970–1981), former treasurer of Illinois (1967–1970), and Democratic nominee for governor in 1982
- Larry Burgess, perennial candidate

==== Withdrew ====
- Neil Hartigan, incumbent attorney general of Illinois (1983–1991) and former lieutenant governor of Illinois (1973–1977) (endorsed Stevenson, successfully ran for reelection as attorney general)

Democratic gubernatorial primary
Party	Candidate	Votes	%
Democratic	Adlai E. Stevenson	735,249	92.93
Democratic	Larry Burgess	55,930	7.07
Write-in		1	0.00
Total votes		791,180	100

=== Lieutenant governor ===
Democratic lieutenant gubernatorial primary
Party	Candidate	Votes	%
Democratic	Mark J. Fairchild	340,727	51.75
Democratic	George E. Sangmeister	317,700	48.25
Write-in		4	0.00
Total votes		658,431	100

== Republican primary ==
=== Governor ===
Incumbent James R. Thompson defeated his sole challenger, Peter Bowen.

Republican gubernatorial primary
Party	Candidate	Votes	%
Republican	James R. Thompson (incumbent)	452,685	90.90
Republican	Peter Bowen	45,236	9.08
Write-in		61	0.01
Total votes		497,982	100

=== Lieutenant governor ===
Incumbent George Ryan won the Republican primary for lieutenant governor, running unopposed.

Republican lieutenant gubernatorial primary
Party	Candidate	Votes	%
Republican	George Ryan (incumbent)	441,672	100
Write-in		7	0.00
Total votes		441,679	100

== Third-party nominations ==
Adlai Stevenson III's newly-formed Illinois Solidarity Party nominated him for governor. Mike Howlett, an associate judge on the Cook County Circuit Court and son of former Illinois Secretary of State Michael Howlett, was nominated for lieutenant governor. Stevenson opted to avoid having his ticket spoiling the performance of non-LaRouche affiliated Democratic nominees for statewide office by having political unknowns nominated on his Solidarity slate for all offices except lieutenant governor and secretary of state.

The Libertarian Party nominated Gary L. Shilts for governor and Gerry Walsh for lieutenant governor.

The Socialist Workers Party nominated Diane Roling for governor and Jim Little for lieutenant governor.

Chicago Mayor Harold Washington, a strong supporter of Stevenson's candidacy, worked to combat an attempt by a Black activist to collect signatures for a third-party slate of Black candidates for statewide office, which was seen as likely to threaten Stevenson in a general election by dividing the Black vote.

== General election ==
Thompson's reelection campaign received the backing of incumbent Republican president Ronald Reagan.

1986 Illinois gubernatorial election
Party	Candidate	Votes	%	±%
Republican	James R. Thompson (incumbent)/ George Ryan (incumbent)	1,655,849	52.67	+3.23
Illinois Solidarity	Adlai Stevenson III/ Mike Howlett	1,256,626	39.97	N/A
Democratic	No candidate/ Mark Fairchild	208,830	6.64	−42.66
Libertarian	Gary L. Shilts/ Gerry Walsh	15,646	0.50	−0.16
Socialist Workers	Diane Roling/ Jim Little	6,843	0.22	+0.22
Write-in	Charles E. Koen	141	0.01	N/A
Write-in	Wilbur L. Keeling	30	0.00	N/A
Write-in	David L. Bernabie	13	0.00	N/A
Majority		399,223	12.70	
Turnout		3,143,978	52.37	
Republican hold		Swing		
