= 1988 Illinois elections =

- November 8, 1988
- Turnout: 73.89%

Elections were held in Illinois on Tuesday, November 8, 1988.

Primaries were held on March 15.

== Election information ==
=== Turnout ===
Turnout during the primary was 42.56%, with 2,552,932 ballots cast (with 1,588,438 Democratic ballots, 899,153 Republican ballots, 418 Illinois Solidarity, and 34,923 nonpartisan ballots cast).

Turnout during the general election was 73.89%, 4,697,192 ballots cast.

=== Straight-ticket voting ===
Illinois had a straight-ticket voting option in 1988.

Party	Number of straight-ticket votes
Democratic	855,402
Republican	839,467
Illinois Solidarity	1,442
Libertarian	2,365

== Federal elections ==
=== United States President ===
Illinois voted for Republican ticket of George H. W. Bush and Dan Quayle.

This was the sixth consecutive election in which the state had voted for the Republican ticket in a presidential election. As of the 2020 election, it is also the last time that the state has voted for the Republican ticket.

=== United States House ===
All of Illinois' 22 congressional seats were up for reelection in 1988.

== State elections ==
=== State Senate ===
Some of the seats of the Illinois Senate were up for election in 1988. Democrats retained control of the chamber.

=== State House of Representatives ===
All of the seats in the Illinois House of Representatives were up for election in 1988. Democrats retained control of the chamber.

=== Trustees of University of Illinois ===
1988 Trustees of University of Illinois election
- November 8, 1988

A regularly scheduled election was held for three of nine seats for trustees of University of Illinois system for full six-year terms, while a special election was held to fill an additional seat for a partial term.

==== Regular election ====
An election was held for three of nine seats for trustees of University of Illinois system for six-year terms.

The election saw the election of new three new trustees, Republicans Donald W. Grabowski and Judith Reese as well as Democrat Ken Boyle.

First-term incumbent Democrat Albert N. Logan lost reelection.

Third-term incumbent Democrats George W. Howard III and William D. Forsyth Jr. were not nominated for reelection.

Trustees of the University of Illinois election
Party	Candidate	Votes	%
Republican	Judith Reese	1,954,187	16.52
Republican	Donald W. Grabowski	1,899,739	16.06
Democratic	Ken Boyle	1,890,185	15.98
Republican	John F. Rundquist	1,836,088	15.52
Democratic	Albert N. Logan (incumbent)	1,826,705	15.44
Democratic	Eden Martin	1,821,057	15.40
Libertarian	Katherine M. Kelley	184,735	1.56
Libertarian	Anne McCracken	167,029	1.41
Illinois Solidarity	Martin C. Ortega	97,887	0.83
Libertarian	Stephen Nelson	89,414	0.76
Illinois Solidarity	Alan Port	61,935	0.52
Total votes		11,828,961	100

==== Special election ====
A special election was held to fill the trustee seat left vacant by Democrat Anne E. Smith. Smith's unexpired term would end in 1991. The seat was filled by the interim appointment of Republican Paul R. Cicero. He was defeated by Democrat Gloria Jackson Bacon.

Turnout in the special election was 60.60%.

Trustee of the University of Illinois special election
Party	Candidate	Votes	%
Democratic	Gloria Jackson Bacon	1,983,643	51.50
Republican	Paul R. Cicero	1,868,322	48.50
Total votes		3,851,965	100

=== Judicial elections ===
Multiple judicial positions were up for election in 1988.

=== Ballot measures ===
Illinois voters voted on several ballot measures in 1988. In order to be approved, measures required either 60% support among those specifically voting on the measure or 50% support among all ballots cast in the elections.

==== Redemption Period for Tax Delinquent Property Amendment ====
The Illinois Redemption Period for Tax Delinquent Property Amendment, a legislatively referred constitutional amendment which would amend Article IX, Section 8 of the Constitution of Illinois to modify the redemption period on the sale of a tax delinquent property, failed to meet either threshold to amend the constitution. It only missed the threshold of 60% of votes cast specifically on the measure by a mere 0.87% margin (21,960 votes).

Redemption Period for Tax Delinquent Property Amendment
Option	Votes	% of votes on measure	% of all ballots cast
Yes	1,497,885	59.13	31.89
No	1,035,190	40.87	22.04
Total votes	2,533,075	100	53.93
Voter turnout	39.85%		

Amendment results by county Yes: 60–70%; 50–60%; No: 60–70%; 50–60%

==== Voting Requirement Amendment ====
Voters approved the Voting Requirement Amendment, a legislatively referred constitutional amendment which amended Article III, Section 1 of the Constitution of Illinois to lower the voting age in the state constitution to 18 and lower the residency requirement to vote to 30 days.

The voting age in Illinois was already 18, due to the passage of the Twenty-sixth Amendment to the United States Constitution. However, the voting age in the state constitution (superseded by United States Constitution) was still 21.

Voting Requirement Amendment
Option	Votes	% of votes on measure	% of all ballots cast
Yes	2,086,744	64.23	44.43
No	1,162,258	35.77	24.74
Total votes	3,249,002	100	69.17
Voter turnout	51.11%		

Amendment results by county Yes: 70–80%; 60–70%; 50–60%

==== Proposed call for a Constitutional Convention ====
A measure which would call for a state constitutional convention failed. Article XIV of the Constitution of Illinois requires that Illinois voters be asked at least every 20 years if they desire a constitutional convention, thus this election was an automatic ballot referral. It was constitutionally required to be held, since the last vote on holding a constitutional convention had occurred in 1968.

Proposed call for a Constitutional Convention
Option	Votes	% of votes on referendum	% of all ballots cast
Yes	900,109	24.82	19.16
No	2,727,144	75.18	58.06
Total votes	3,627,253	100	77.22
Voter turnout	57.06%		

Constitutional Convention results by county No: 80–90%; 70–80%; 60–70%; 50–60%

== Local elections ==
Local elections were held. These included county elections, such as the Cook County elections.
