= 1986 Illinois elections =

- November 4, 1986
- Turnout: 55.34%

Elections were held in Illinois on Tuesday, November 4, 1986.

Primaries were held March 18, 1986.

== Election information ==
1986 was a midterm election year in the United States.

=== Creation of the Illinois Solidarity Party ===
After LaRouche movement disciples won the Democratic primaries for Lieutenant Governor and Secretary of State, Adlai Stevenson III created the Solidarity Party primarily to run Democratic candidates against them in the general election. He himself dropped off of the Democratic ticket for Governor, which he had won the primary for, and ran instead as the Solidarity Party candidate for Governor. The two Lyndon LaRouche-affiliated candidates, Mark J. Fairchild for Lieutenant Governor and Janice Hart for Secretary of State, had not seen their affiliations with LaRouche well-publicized until after they won their upset primary defeats over Stevenson-backed candidates George Sangmeister and Aurelia Pucinski.

Illinois law required any unestablished party to run a full slate in order to obtain ballot access, thus, Stevenson ran candidates in all races.

=== Turnout ===
Turnout in the primary was 26.23%, with 1,602,156 ballots cast. 1,014,908 Democratic and 570,661 Republican primary ballots were cast.

Turnout in the general election was 55.34%, with 3,332,450 ballots cast.

=== Straight-ticket voting ===
Illinois had a straight-ticket voting option in 1986.

Party	Number of straight-ticket votes
Democratic	107,788
Republican	465,469
Allin Walker	17
Illinois Solidarity	1,901
Libertarian	1,239
Quality Congressional Representation	421
Socialist Workers	358

== Federal elections ==
=== United States Senate ===
Incumbent Democratic Senator Alan Dixon was reelected.

=== United States House ===
All Illinois seats in the United States House of Representatives were up for election in 1986.

== State elections ==
=== Governor and Lieutenant Governor ===
1986 Illinois gubernatorial election
- November 4, 1986
- Turnout: 52.37%
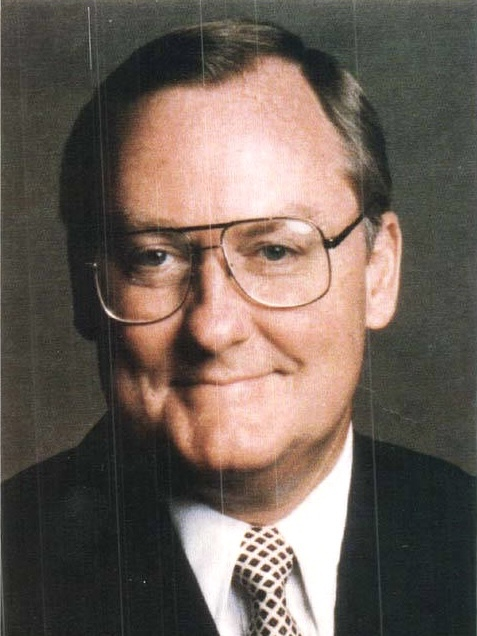

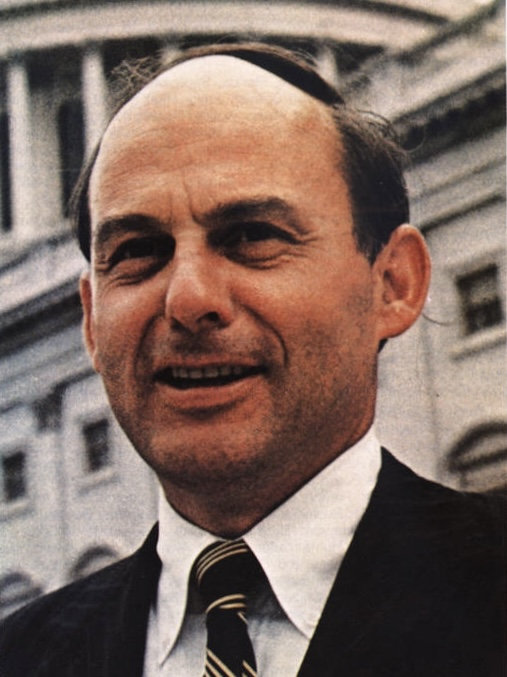

Nominee	James R. Thompson	Adlai Stevenson III	No candidate
Party	Republican	Illinois Solidarity	Democratic
Running mate	George Ryan	Mike Howlett	Mark Fairchild
Popular vote	1,655,849	1,256,626	208,830
Percentage	52.7%	40.0%	6.6%
- County Results: Thompson: 40-50% 50-60% 60-70% 70-80% Stevenson: 40-50% 50-60%
Governor before election
James R. Thompson
Republican
Elected Governor
James R. Thompson
Republican

Incumbent Governor James R. Thompson won reelection to a fourth term, defeating Adlai Stevenson III. This was a rematch of the previous 1982 gubernatorial election, which saw Stevenson as a Democratic nominee.

Stevenson, who had won the Democratic gubernatorial primary, withdrew from the Democratic ticket after Mark Fairchild, a follower of Lyndon LaRouche, won the Democratic primary for lieutenant governor. Stevenson refused to run on a ticket with supporters of LaRouche's ideology. Stevenson instead created the Illinois Solidarity Party and ran as its nominee.

Gubernatorial election
Party	Candidate	Votes	%
Republican	James R. Thompson (incumbent) / George Ryan (incumbent)	1,655,849	52.67
Illinois Solidarity	Adlai Stevenson III / Mike Howlett	1,256,626	39.97
Democratic	No candidate / Mark Fairchild	208,830	6.64
Libertarian	Gary L. Shilts/ Gerry Walsh	15,646	0.50
Socialist Workers	Diane Roling/ Jim Little	6,843	0.22
Write-in	Others	184	0.01
Total votes		3,143,978	100

=== Attorney General ===
1986 Illinois Attorney General election
- November 4, 1986
- Turnout: 51.95%
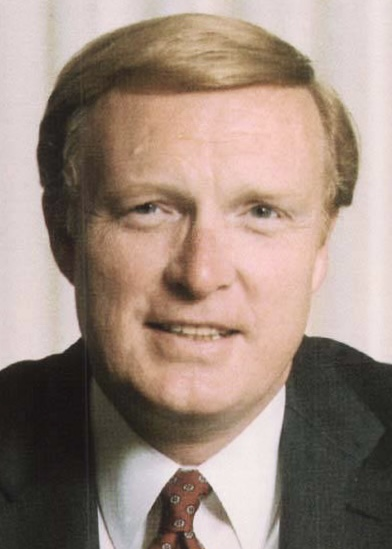

Nominee	Neil Hartigan	Bernard Carey
Party	Democratic	Republican
Popular vote	1,925,012	1,129,193
Percentage	61.71%	36.20%
- County results Hartigan: 40–50% 50–60% 60–70% 70–80% Carey: 40–50% 50–60%
Attorney General before election
Neil Hartigan
Democratic
Elected Attorney General
Neil Hartigan
Democratic

Incumbent Attorney General Neil Hartigan, a Democrat, was reelected to a second term.

==== Democratic primary ====
Incumbent Neil Hartigan defeated Chicago alderman Martin J. Oberman in the Democratic primary.

Hartigan had originally declared his intention to forgo seeking reelection, and instead run for governor, but he ultimately reversed course and sought reelection after Adlai Stevenson III entered the race for governor.

Attorney General Democratic primary
Party	Candidate	Votes	%
Democratic	Neil F. Hartigan (incumbent)	531,801	61.67
Democratic	Martin J. Oberman	330,561	38.33
Write-in	Others	1	0.00
Total votes		862,363	100

==== Republican primary ====
Republican Village President of Arlington Heights James T. Ryan won the Republican primary, running unopposed. Ryan stepped-down as nominee after allegations arose that he had committed domestic abuse against both his wife and ex-wife, which arose soon after he received his party's nomination.

There had been originally been several other candidates running for the Republican nomination in the primary, but all withdrew soon after Democratic incumbent Hartigan announced that he would seek reelection.

If he had been elected, Ryan would have been the first Republican sitting mayor elected to statewide office in Illinois since Edward C. Akin was elected Attorney General in 1898.

After Ryan withdrew as the Republican nominee, he was replaced on the ballot by Bernard Carey, a member of the Cook County Board of Commissioners who had also formerly served as Cook County State's Attorney from 1972 through 1980. Ryan's withdrawal had taken place five months before the general election.

Attorney General Republican primary
Party	Candidate	Votes	%
Republican	James T. Ryan	434,917	100
Write-in	Others	4	0.00
Total votes		434,921	100

==== General election ====
Attorney General election
Party	Candidate	Votes	%
Democratic	Neil Hartigan (incumbent)	1,925,012	61.71
Republican	Bernard Carey	1,129,193	36.20
Illinois Solidarity	John Ray Keith	33,702	1.08
Libertarian	Natalie Loder Clark	24,068	0.77
Socialist Workers	Scott Dombeck	7,254	0.23
Total votes		3,119,229	100

=== Secretary of State ===
1986 Illinois Secretary of State election
- November 4, 1986
- Turnout: 51.97
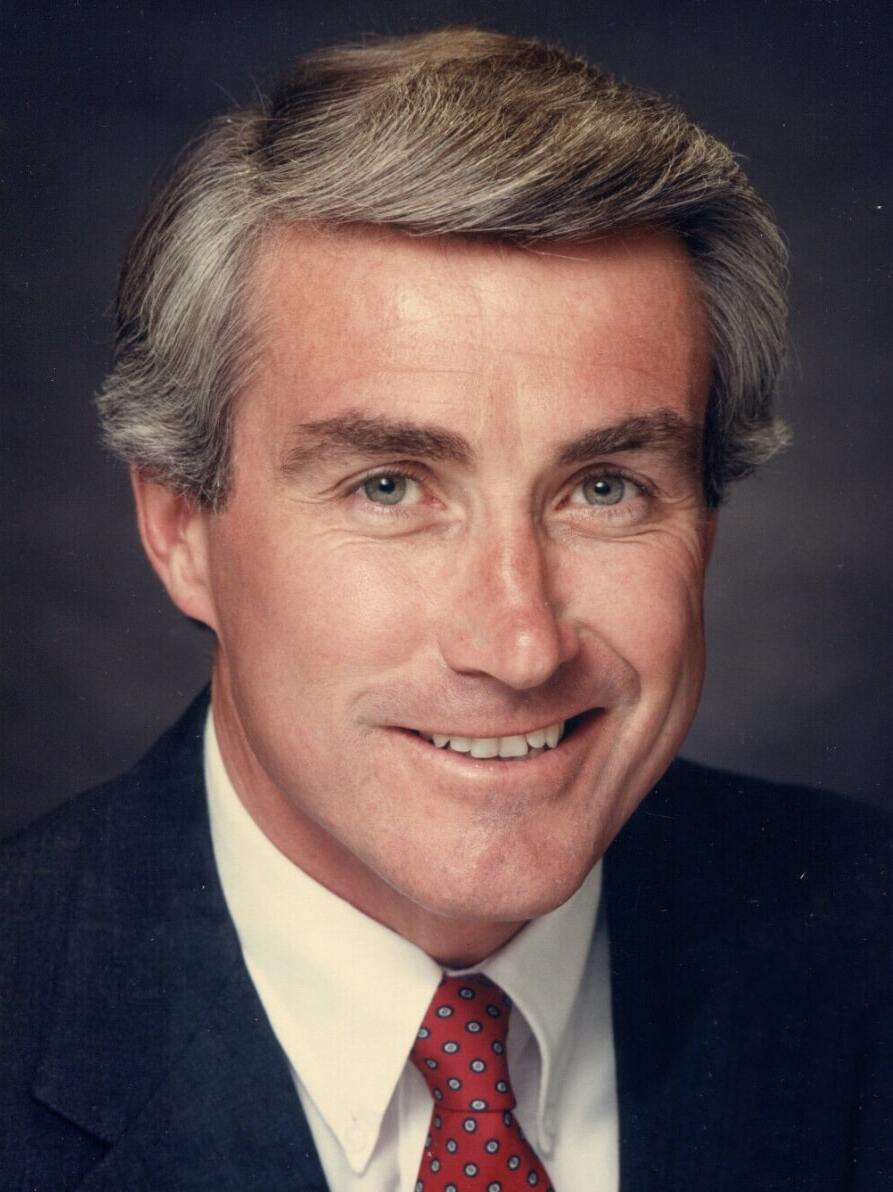

Nominee	Jim Edgar	Jane Spirgel	Janice Hart
Party	Republican	Illinois Solidarity	Democratic
Popular vote	2,095,489	521,410	478,361
Percentage	67.16%	16.71%	15.33%
- County results Edgar: 40-50% 50–60% 60–70% 70–80% 80-90%
Secretary of State before election
Jim Edgar
Republican
Elected Secretary of State
Jim Edgar
Republican

Incumbent Secretary of State Jim Edgar, a Republican first appointed in 1981 and subsequently elected to a full term in 1982, was reelected to a second full term.

==== Democratic primary ====
Little known candidate Janice Hart won an upset victory over Aurelia Pucinski (who had the backing of Adlai Stevenson III and others). While, not well-reported until after the primary, Hart was a member of the LaRouche movement.

Secretary of State Democratic primary
Party	Candidate	Votes	%
Democratic	Janice A. Hart	375,405	51.17
Democratic	Aurelia Marie Pucinski	358,232	48.83
Write-in	Others	1	0.00
Total votes		733,637	100

==== Republican primary ====
Secretary of State Republican primary
Party	Candidate	Votes	%
Republican	Jim Edgar (incumbent)	487,842	100
Write-in	Others	8	0.00
Total votes		487,850	100

==== General election ====
The Illinois Solidarity Party ran Jane N. Spirgel in the election. Spirgel was an outgoing member of the DuPage County Board (on which she was the sole remaining Democratic member and had first been elected in 1974).

Secretary of State election
Party	Candidate	Votes	%
Republican	Jim Edgar	2,095,489	67.16
Illinois Solidarity	Jane N. Spirgel	521,410	16.71
Democratic	Janice A. Hart	478,361	15.33
Libertarian	Steven L. Givot	17,566	0.56
Socialist Workers	Holly Harkness	7,549	0.24
Total votes		3,120,375	100

=== Comptroller ===
1986 Illinois State Comptroller election
- November 4, 1986
- Turnout: 51.07%
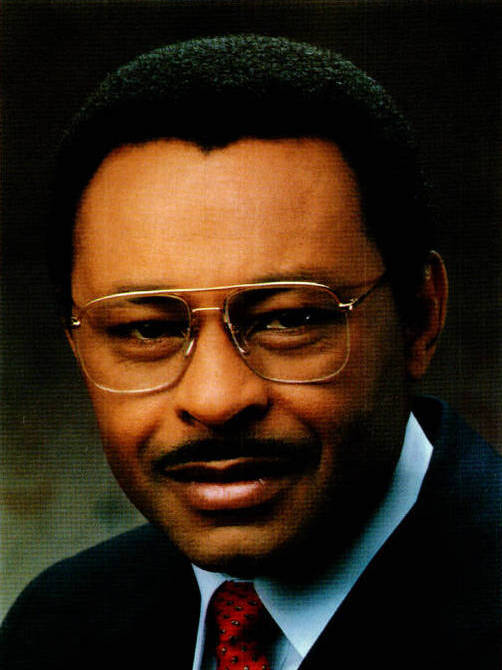

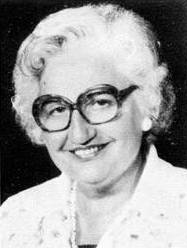
Nominee	Roland Burris	Adeline Geo-Karis
Party	Democratic	Republican
Popular vote	1,880,413	1,074,923
Percentage	61.33%	35.06%
- County results Burris: 40–50% 50–60% 60–70% 70–80% Geo-Karis: 40–50% 50–60% 60–70%
State Comptroller before election
Roland Burris
Democratic
Elected State Comptroller
Roland Burris
Democratic

Incumbent Comptroller Roland Burris, a Democrat, was reelected to a third term.

==== Democratic primary ====
Comptroller Democratic primary
Party	Candidate	Votes	%
Democratic	Roland W. Burris (incumbent)	633,142	77.74
Democratic	Donald S. Clark	181,252	22.26
Write-in	Others	1	0.00
Total votes		814,395	100

==== Republican primary ====
State Senator Adeline Jay Geo-Karis won the Republican primary unopposed.

Comptroller Republican primary
Party	Candidate	Votes	%
Republican	Adeline Jay Geo-Karis	415,009	100
Write-in	Others	1	0.00
Total votes		415,010	100

==== General election ====
Comptroller election
Party	Candidate	Votes	%
Democratic	Roland W. Burris (incumbent)	1,880,413	61.33
Republican	Adeline Jay Geo-Karis	1,074,923	35.06
Illinois Solidarity	A. Patricia Scott	78,389	2.56
Libertarian	Donald Morris	22,428	0.73
Socialist Workers	Jim Miles	9,998	0.33
Total votes		3,066,151	100

=== Treasurer ===
1986 Illinois State Treasurer election
- November 4, 1986
- Turnout: 51.08%
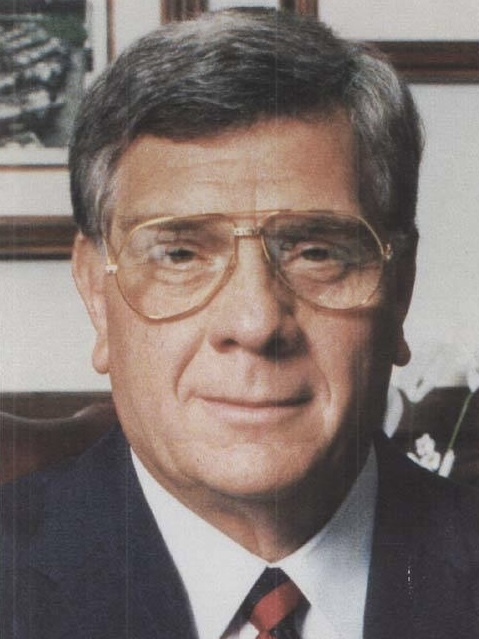

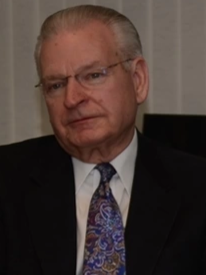
Nominee	Jerome Cosentino	J. Michael Houston
Party	Democratic	Republican
Popular vote	1,724,979	1,252,796
Percentage	56.25%	40.85%
- County results Cosentino: 40–50% 50–60% 60–70% Houston: 40–50% 50–60% 60–70% Tie: 40–50%
Treasurer before election
James Donnewald
Democratic
Elected Treasurer
Jerome Cosentino
Democratic

Incumbent Treasurer James Donnewald, a Democrat, lost the Democratic primary to former Treasurer Jerome Cosentino. Consentino won the general election, earning him a second non-consecutive term.

==== Democratic primary ====
Incumbent James Donnewald lost renomination to former Treasurer Jerome Cosentino. Donnewald had been the party organization's favored candidate. Other candidates running included Cook County Board of Appeals member Pat Quinn and LaRouche movement member Robert D. Hart (who had the formal backing of Lyndon LaRouche's NDPC).

Treasurer Democratic primary
Party	Candidate	Votes	%
Democratic	Jerry Cosentino	241,006	30.22
Democratic	James H. Donnewald (incumbent)	235,052	29.47
Democratic	Patrick Quinn	208,775	26.18
Democratic	Robert D. Hart	112,645	14.13
Write-in	Others	1	0.00
Total votes		797,478	100

==== Republican primary ====
J. Michael Houston, the mayor of Springfield, won the Republican nomination. Houston was seeking to become the first Republican Illinois Treasurer in over twenty years. He was also seeking to be the first Republican sitting mayor elected to statewide office in Illinois since Edward C. Akin was elected Illinois Attorney General in 1898.

Treasurer Republican primary
Party	Candidate	Votes	%
Republican	Mike Houston	421,486	100
Write-in	Others	3	0.00
Total votes		421,489	100

==== General election ====
Treasurer election
Party	Candidate	Votes	%
Democratic	Jerry Cosentino	1,724,979	56.25
Republican	Mike Houston	1,252,796	40.85
Illinois Solidarity	William E. Skedd	50,570	1.65
Libertarian	Jay D. Marsh	19,875	0.65
Socialist Workers	Lucille Robbins	18,285	0.60
Total votes		3,066,505	100

=== State Senate ===
Some of the seats of the Illinois Senate were up for election in 1986. Democrats retained control of the chamber.

=== State House of Representatives ===
All of the seats in the Illinois House of Representatives were up for election in 1986. Democrats retained control of the chamber.

=== Trustees of University of Illinois ===
1986 Trustees of University of Illinois election
- November 4, 1986

An election was held for three of nine seats for Trustees of University of Illinois system for six year terms.

The election saw the reelection incumbent Democrat Nina T. Shepherd to a third term, as well as the election of new Democratic trustees Judith Ann Calder and Charles Wolff.

First-term incumbent Republicans Galey Day and Dean E. Madden lost reelection.

Trustees of the University of Illinois election
Party	Candidate	Votes	%
Democratic	Nina T. Shephered (incumbent)	1,394,762	16.67
Democratic	Judith Ann Calder	1,362,623	16.29
Democratic	Charles Wolff	1,300,436	15.54
Republican	Dean E. Madden (incumbent)	1,271,806	15.20
Republican	Mrs. Galey Day (incumbent)	1,253,707	14.99
Republican	David A. McConnell	1,221,379	14.60
Illinois Solidarity	Elena Mulcahy	108,337	1.30
Illinois Solidarity	James S. Spencer	102,419	1.22
Illinois Solidarity	Philip Martin	92,253	1.10
Libertarian	Anne McCracken	83,586	1.00
Libertarian	Stephen N. Nelson	52,823	0.63
Libertarian	Gene Bourke	43,312	0.52
Socialist Workers	Pedro Vasquez	31,220	0.37
Socialist Workers	Cathleen Gutekanst	28,093	0.34
Socialist Workers	Stephen Bloodworth	19,755	0.24
Total votes		8,366,511	100

=== Judicial elections ===
Multiple judicial positions were up for election in 1986.

=== Ballot measures ===
Illinois voters voted on two ballot measures in 1986, both of them legislatively referred constitutional amendments. In order to be approved, measures required either 60% support among those specifically voting on the amendment or 50% support among all ballots cast in the elections.

==== Bail Amendment ====
Voters approved the Bail Amendment, a legislatively referred constitutional amendment which amended Article I, Section 9 of the Constitution of Illinois to further expand the population that may be denied bail.

Bail Amendment
Option	Votes	% of votes on measure	% of all ballots cast
Yes	1,368,242	77.25	41.18
No	402,891	22.75	12.13
Total votes	1,771,133	100	53.31
Voter turnout	29.50%		

Amendment results by county Yes: 80–90%; 70–80%; 60–70%

==== Exempt Veterans' Organizations from Property Taxes Amendment ====
Exempt Veterans' Organizations from Property Taxes Amendment, a legislatively refereed constitutional amendment which would amend Article IX, Section 6 of the Constitution of Illinois to exempt property used exclusively by veterans' organizations from property taxes, failed to meet either threshold amend the constitution.

Exempt Veterans' Organizations from Property Taxes Amendment
Option	Votes	% of votes on measure	% of all ballots cast
Yes	860,609	54.19	25.90
No	727,737	45.82	21.90
Total votes	1,588,346	100	47.80
Voter turnout	26.46%		

Amendment results by county Yes: 70–80%; 60–70%; 50–60%; No: 50–60%

== Local elections ==
Local elections were held. These included county elections, such as the Cook County elections.
