= Aurelia Pucinski =

American judge

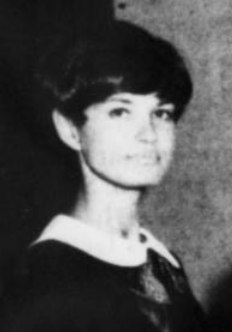
- Aurelia Pucinski in 1967, from a US State Department publication

Judge of the Illinois Appellate Court for the First District
- Incumbent
- Assumed office 2010
- Preceded by: Denise M. O'Malley

Judge of the Circuit Court of Cook County
- In office 2004–2010

Clerk of the Circuit Court of Cook County
- In office 1988–2000
- Preceded by: Morgan M. Finley
- Succeeded by: Dorothy A. Brown

Member of the MWRDGC Board of Commissioners
- In office December 1984 – December 1988

Personal details
- Born: April 29, 1947 (age 79) Chicago, Illinois
- Party: Democratic; Republican (1997–2004)
- Parent: Roman Pucinski (father)
- Education: Catholic University of America (B.A.); DePaul University (J.D.)

Aurelia Marie Pucinski (born April 29, 1947) is a judge on the Illinois Appellate Court for the First District. She previously served as a trial judge and clerk of the Circuit Court of Cook County. Her second term expires in 2030.

== Early life ==
Born Aurelia Marie Pucinski in Chicago, Illinois, she was named for her paternal grandmother. Her mother was Aurelia Bordin Pucinski. Her father, Roman Pucinski, was a U.S. Congressman from Illinois's 11th congressional district (1959-1973) during her childhood and youth. After his defeat in the nationwide 1972 Republican landslide, he represented the 41st Ward on the Chicago Alderman from 1973 until 1991. Aurelia Pucinski graduated from Catholic University of America in Washington, D.C. in 1968 with a B.A. in History. She then taught at a grammar school in Skokie, Illinois. She decided to become a lawyer, enrolled at the DePaul University College of Law in Chicago, and received a J.D. degree from DePaul in 1975.

== Career ==
After beginning her career in a neighborhood law office (1977-1980), Pucinski followed her father's lead into Democratic party politics. One of her first public efforts was representing citizens who sued the Chicago Board of Education to keep a local school open. She also served as an assistant corporation counsel for the City of Chicago and as regional counsel for the U.S. Small Business Administration. In 1984 Pucinski became a Commissioner of the Metropolitan Water Reclamation District of Greater Chicago, a position she held until 1988.

Although Pucinski had the support of Democratic gubernatorial nominee Adlai Stevenson III in the Democratic primary for Secretary of State of Illinois in the 1986 election, she was upset by LaRouche supporter Janice Hart, who failed to win in the general election.

=== Cook County office ===
In 1988, clerk of the Cook County Circuit Court Morgan M. Finley was indicted for corruption (for which he would be convicted the following year). He did not seek reelection in that year's election. Pucinski resoundingly defeated former Chicago mayor Jane Byrne in the Democratic primary to succeed him as Clerk of the Cook County Circuit Court, then defeated former Democrat turned Republican Edward Vrdolyak in the general election. She would win reelection to two additional terms in 1992 and 1996. As Circuit Court Clerk, Pucinski became Cook County's first official to institute a code of ethics and internal ethics board, as well as led the office into the 21st century by adopting new technology to improve efficiency and respond to law enforcement, attorneys and all citizens, including greatly improving processing of child support payments.

In 1994, Pucinski ran in the Democratic primary for President of the Cook County Board of Commissioners. The race was a three-way contest between her, John Stroger, and Maria Pappas. Stroger defeated her and Pappas.

In December 1997, Pucinski switched parties to the Republican Party to run as that party's nominee for President Cook County Board of Commissioners in the 1998 election, in which she lost to Stroger in the general election.

Pucinski did not seek reelection as clerk of the Circuit Court of Cook County in 2000, and Democrat Dorothy A. Brown was elected to succeed her.

=== Judiciary ===
In August 2002, Governor George Ryan appointed Pucinski to head the Illinois Department of Financial and Professional Regulation. Ryan would later reassign Pucinski to the Illinois Environmental Regulatory and Review Commission. In the 2002 general election, Pucinski ran for the a judgeship in the First District of the Illinois Appellate Court. Democratic candidate James Fitzgerald Smith defeated Pucinski by a sixteen point margin (58%-42%).

In 2004, she rejoined the Democrats and became a judge on the Cook County Circuit Court. As a trial judge, Pucinski helped handle more than 10,000 domestic violence cases (including against the elderly), and later was assigned to hear adoption, election, property tax and mental health cases. Her bench book summarized forms and procedures to handle civil protection orders. She also frequently speaks about elder abuse, including at a Chicago Bar Association panel on third party issues in probate, mental health, guardianship and domestic relations, as well as won the City of Chicago's Luminary Award for developing a program to assist elderly victims of domestic abuse.

In 2010, winning the Democratic nomination and running uncontested in the general election, Pucinksi was elected to the seat on the Illinois Appellate Court left vacant by Denise M. O'Malley.

Pucinski ran for the Democratic nomination for Justice of the Illinois Supreme Court in 2012, but Judge Mary Jane Theis won that seat, so Pucinski continued on the intermediate appellate court. Civil rights groups, including Chicago Appleseed Center for Fair Courts, report she has criticized judicial campaign financing.

In 2020, she succeeded in her first retention election for the Illinois appellate court.

== Personal life ==
Pucinski is divorced and has three children.
