= Clerk of the Circuit Court of Cook County =

County clerk of Cook County, Illinois

- Incumbent; Mariyana Spyropoulos since December 4, 2024
- Term length: 4 years

The Clerk of the Circuit Court of Cook County is the clerk of Circuit Court of Cook County, located in Cook County, Illinois.

== Office description ==
The office was first established in 1831, the year that Cook County was created. In 1848, the office of Cook County recorder was merged into the office of clerk of the Circuit Court. The office was accordingly renamed as "clerk and recorder". For decades thereafter, the office served not only as the Circuit Court's clerk, but also served as the ex-officio county recorder of deeds. This ended in 1872, when the county's recorder of deeds was again created as a separate office.

On January 1, 1964, the more than 200 courts of Cook County were unified. Replacing the separate clerks that existed for different courts was a single popularly elected clerk of courts for newly merged Circuit Court of Cook County.

== Pre-1964 officeholders ==
Clerk	Term in office	Party	Notes	Cite
R. J. Hamilton	1831–1841	Democratic		
H.G. Hubbard	1841–1843			
Samuel Hoard	1843–____			
Norman T. Gassette	Dec. 1868–Dec. 1, 1872	Republican		
Jacob Gross	Dec. 1872–Dec. 1884	Republican		
Henry Best	Dec. 1884–___	Republican		
John E. Conroy		Democratic		
Joseph P. McMahon				

== Officeholders since 1964 ==
The following individuals have held the office since the modern iteration of the Circuit Court of Cook County was established in 1964.

Clerk	Term in office	Party	Notes	Cite
Joseph B. McDonough	1964–1968			
Matthew J. Danaher	December 1968 – 1974	Democratic	Elected in 1968 and 1972	
Morgan M. Finley	1974–December 1988	Democratic	Appointed in 1974; elected in 1976, 1980, 1984	
Aurelia Pucinski	December 1988–December 1, 2000	Democratic (1988–1998); Republican (1998–2000)	Elected in 1988, 1992, 1996	
Dorothy A. Brown	December 1, 2000 – December 1, 2020	Democratic	Elected in 2000, 2004, 2008, 2012, 2016	
Iris Martinez	December 1, 2020–December 2024	Democratic	Elected in 2020	
Mariyana Spyropoulos	December 4, 2024–present	Democratic	Elected in 2024	

== Recent election results ==
Clerk of the Circuit Court general elections
Year	Winning candidate	Party	Vote (pct)	Opponent	Party	Vote (pct)	Opponent	Party	Vote (pct)	Opponent	Party	Vote (pct)
1984	Morgan M. Finley	Democratic	1,260,257 (61.32%)	Deborah L. Murphy	Republican	794,882 (38.68%)						
1988	Aurelia Pucinski	Democratic	1,170,558 (59.38%)	Edward R. Vrdolyak	Republican	800,783 (40.62%)						
1992	Aurelia Pucinski	Democratic	1,349,837 (68.39%)	Herbert T. Schumann, Jr.	Republican	486,185 (24.63%)	Deloris "Dee" Jones	Harold Washington Party	137,642 (6.97%)			
1996	Aurelia Pucinski	Democratic	1,149,216 (70.37%)	Sandra M. Stavropoulos	Republican	397,191 (24.32%)	Philip Morris	Harold Washington Party	64,204 (3.03%)	Janet Dennis	Justice Party	22,581 (1.38%)
2000	Dorothy A. Brown	Democratic	1,197,773 (72.94%)	Nancy F. Mynard	Republican	444,336 (27.06%)						
2004	Dorothy A. Brown	Democratic	1,365,285 (74.06%)	Judith A. Kleiderman	Republican	478,222 (25.94%)						
2008	Dorothy A. Brown	Democratic	1,315,731 (68.29%)	Dianne S. Shapiro	Republican	517,115 (26.84%)	Paloma Andrade	Green	93,906 (4.87%)			
2012	Dorothy A. Brown	Democratic	1,291,499 (70.44%)	Diane S. Shapiro	Republican	541,973 (29.56%)						
2016	Dorothy A. Brown	Democratic	1,345,696 (67.22%)	Diane S. Shapiro	Republican	656,232 (32.78%)						
2020	Iris Y. Martinez	Democratic	1,549,615 (73.03%)	Barbara Bellar	Republican	572,169 (26.97%)						
2024	Mariyana Spyropoulos	Democratic		Lupe Aguirre	Republican		Michael Murphy	Libertarian				
