= Electoral history of Michael Madigan =

List of political elections featuring Michael Madigan as a candidate

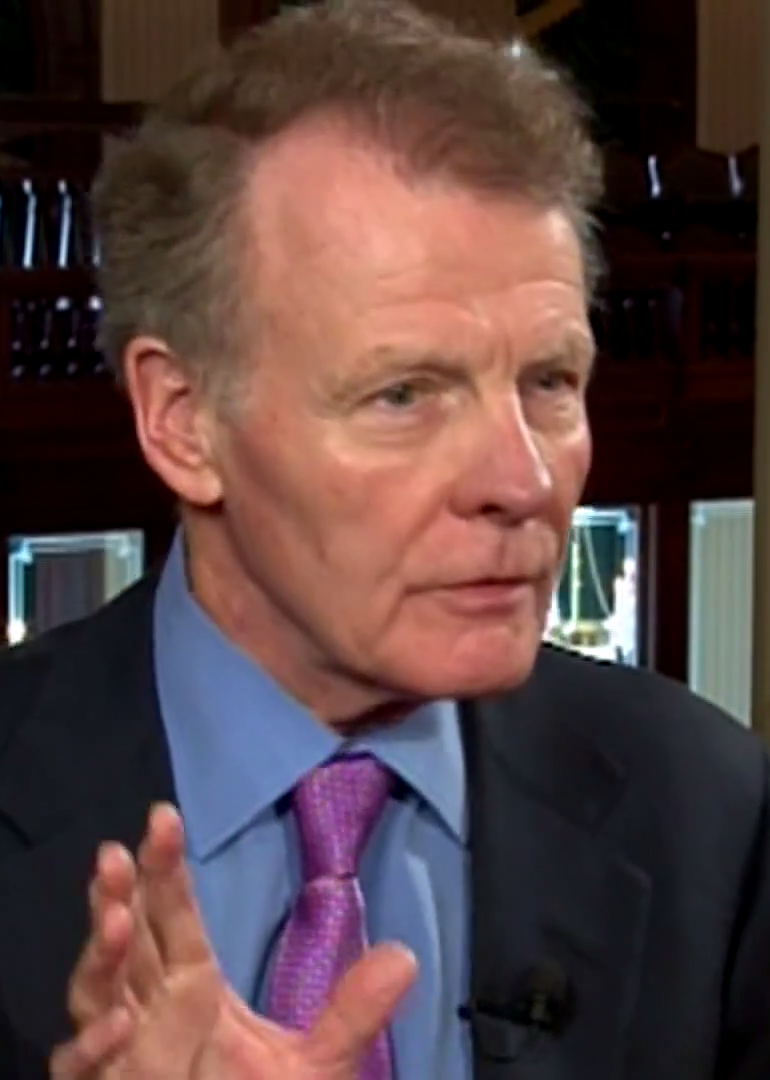
Former Illinois Speaker Mike Madigan

This is the electoral history of Michael Madigan. Madigan served in the Illinois House of Representatives (1971–2021) and served as the chamber's 67th and 69th Speaker of the House (1983–1995;1997–2021). He served as Chair of the Illinois Democratic Party (1998–2021).

== Illinois Constitutional Convention ==
27th district Member of the Illinois Constitutional Convention, 1969
| Candidate | Votes | % |
|---|---|---|
| Michael J. Madigan | 20,248 | 29.39 |
| Joseph V. Rachunas | 16,839 | 24.44 |
| Joseph K. Prince | 16,539 | 24.01 |
| John J. Foy | 15,270 | 22.16 |
| Total votes | 68,896 | 100.0 |

== Illinois House of Representatives (1970–2020) ==
=== 1970 ===
Illinois' 27th representative district Democratic primary results, 1970
| Party | Candidate | Votes | % |
|---|---|---|---|
| Democratic | Michael J. Madigan | 35,085 | 65.02 |
| Democratic | Robert M. Terzich | 15,746 | 29.18 |
| Democratic | Joseph A. Barracca | 3,127 | 5.80 |
| Total votes | | 53,958 | 100.0 |

Illinois' 27th representative district election results, 1970
| Party | Candidate | Votes | % |
|---|---|---|---|
| Democratic | Michael J. Madigan | 62,645 | 30.11 |
| Republican | Walter (Babe) McAvoy | 49,581 | 23.83 |
| Democratic | Robert M. Terzich | 49,286 | 23.69 |
| Republican | Joseph Potempa | 46,571 | 22.38 |
| Total votes | | 208,083 | 100.0 |

=== 1972 ===
Illinois' 27th legislative district representative Democratic primary results, 1972
| Party | Candidate | Votes | % |
|---|---|---|---|
| Democratic | Michael J. Madigan (incumbent) | 69,687 | 72.09 |
| Democratic | John J. Beatty | 26,980 | 27.91 |
| Write-in | | 1 | 0.00 |
| Total votes | | 96,668 | 100.0 |

Illinois' 27th legislative district representative election results, 1972
| Party | Candidate | Votes | % |
|---|---|---|---|
| Republican | Edmund F. Kucharski | 81,965.5 | 32.03 |
| Democratic | Michael J. Madigan (incumbent) | 65,625.5 | 25.65 |
| Democratic | John J. Beatty | 54,268.5 | 21.21 |
| Republican | Raymond J. Kahoun | 54,007 | 21.11 |
| Total votes | | 255,866.5 | 100.0 |

=== 1974 ===
Illinois' 27th legislative district representative Democratic primary results, 1974
| Party | Candidate | Votes | % |
|---|---|---|---|
| Democratic | Michael J. Madigan (incumbent) | 43,020 | 43.43 |
| Democratic | John J. Beatty (incumbent) | 35,270.5 | 35.60 |
| Democratic | John F. Galvin | 16,451.5 | 16.61 |
| Democratic | Dennis Johnson | 4,319.5 | 4.36 |
| Total votes | | 99,061.5 | 100.0 |

Illinois' 27th legislative district representative election results, 1974
| Party | Candidate | Votes | % |
|---|---|---|---|
| Democratic | Michael J. Madigan (incumbent) | 60,498.5 | 38.14 |
| Democratic | John J. Beatty (incumbent) | 53,219 | 33.55 |
| Republican | Edmund F. Kucharski (incumbent) | 30,710.5 | 19.36 |
| Republican | Herbert F. Setzke | 14,186.5 | 8.94 |
| Total votes | | 158,614.5 | 100.0 |

=== 1976 ===
Illinois' 27th legislative district representative Democratic primary results, 1976
| Party | Candidate | Votes | % |
|---|---|---|---|
| Democratic | Michael J. Madigan (incumbent) | 61,244 | 64.36 |
| Democratic | John J. Beatty (incumbent) | 33,921.5 | 35.64 |
| Total votes | | 95,165.5 | 100.0 |

Illinois' 27th legislative district representative election results, 1976
| Party | Candidate | Votes | % |
|---|---|---|---|
| Democratic | John J. Beatty (incumbent) | 67,568 | 30.62 |
| Democratic | Michael J. Madigan (incumbent) | 64,058 | 29.03 |
| Republican | Edmund F. Kucharski (incumbent) | 58,569 | 26.54 |
| Republican | Herbert F. Setzke | 30,464 | 13.81 |
| Write-in | | 4 | 0.00 |
| Total votes | | 220,663 | 100.0 |

=== 1978 ===
Illinois' 27th legislative district representative Democratic primary results, 1978
| Party | Candidate | Votes | % |
|---|---|---|---|
| Democratic | John J. Beatty (incumbent) | 36,533 | 37.10 |
| Democratic | Michael J. Madigan (incumbent) | 35,802 | 36.36 |
| Democratic | Anita M. Cummings | 15,346.5 | 15.59 |
| Democratic | Joseph P. Migas | 5,177.5 | 5.26 |
| Democratic | W. Harold Kamar | 4,023 | 4.09 |
| Democratic | William Jones | 1,586.5 | 1.61 |
| Total votes | | 98,468.5 | 100.0 |

Illinois' 27th legislative district representative election results, 1978
| Party | Candidate | Votes | % |
|---|---|---|---|
| Democratic | Michael J. Madigan (incumbent) | 67,118 | 35.05 |
| Democratic | John J. Beatty (incumbent) | 65,487.5 | 34.20 |
| Republican | Edmund F. Kucharski (incumbent) | 41,061.5 | 21.45 |
| Republican | Herbert F. Setzke | 17,433.5 | 9.11 |
| Write-in | | 5 | 0.00 |
| Total votes | | 191,465.5 | 100.0 |

=== 1980 ===
Illinois' 27th legislative district representative Democratic primary results, 1980
| Party | Candidate | Votes | % |
|---|---|---|---|
| Democratic | Michael J. Madigan (incumbent) | 60,777.5 | 65.10 |
| Democratic | John J. Beatty (incumbent) | 32,577.5 | 34.90 |
| Write-in | | 2 | 0.00 |
| Total votes | | 93,357 | 100.0 |

Illinois' 27th legislative district representative election results, 1980
| Party | Candidate | Votes | % |
|---|---|---|---|
| Democratic | Michael J. Madigan (incumbent) | 85,119.5 | 36.10 |
| Democratic | John J. Beatty (incumbent) | 66,463 | 28.19 |
| Republican | Edmund F. Kucharski (incumbent) | 53,159.5 | 22.54 |
| Republican | Mary Lou Lyman | 31,061 | 13.17 |
| Write-in | | 1 | 0.00 |
| Total votes | | 235,804 | 100.0 |

=== 1982 ===
Illinois' 30th representative district Democratic primary results, 1982
| Party | Candidate | Votes | % |
|---|---|---|---|
| Democratic | Michael J. Madigan | 17,652 | 99.98 |
| Write-in | | 4 | 0.02 |
| Total votes | | 17,656 | 100.0 |

Illinois' 30th representative district election results, 1982
| Party | Candidate | Votes | % |
|---|---|---|---|
| Democratic | Michael J. Madigan | 29,399 | 76.92 |
| Republican | Leonard Kaczanowski | 8,820 | 23.08 |
| Total votes | | 38,219 | 100.0 |

=== 1984 ===
Illinois' 30th representative district election results, 1984
| Party | Candidate | Votes | % |
|---|---|---|---|
| Democratic | Michael J. Madigan (incumbent) | 27,739 | 67.62 |
| Republican | Leonard Kaczanowski | 13,285 | 32.38 |
| Total votes | | 41,024 | 100.0 |

=== 1986 ===
Illinois' 30th representative district election results, 1986
| Party | Candidate | Votes | % |
|---|---|---|---|
| Democratic | Michael J. Madigan (incumbent) | 27,954 | 78.66 |
| Republican | Stanley C. Sobrya | 7,580 | 21.33 |
| Total votes | | 35,534 | 100.0 |

=== 1988 ===
Illinois' 30th representative district election results, 1988
| Party | Candidate | Votes | % |
|---|---|---|---|
| Democratic | Michael J. Madigan (incumbent) | 28,442 | 66.68 |
| Republican | Edmund F. Kucharski | 13,524 | 31.71 |
| Illinois Solidarity Party | Edard O’Malley | 683 | 1.60 |
| Total votes | | 42,649 | 100.0 |

=== 1990 ===
Illinois' 30th representative district election results, 1990
| Party | Candidate | Votes | % |
|---|---|---|---|
| Democratic | Michael J. Madigan (incumbent) | 24,721 | 75.99 |
| Republican | Shirley A. Kaczanowski | 7,245 | 22.27 |
| Illinois Solidarity Party | Stanley J. Gruca | 564 | 1.73 |
| Total votes | | 32,530 | 100.0 |

=== 1992 ===
Illinois' 22nd representative district Democratic primary results, 1992
| Party | Candidate | Votes | % |
|---|---|---|---|
| Democratic | Michael J. Madigan | 26,586 | 100.0 |
| Total votes | | 26,586 | 100.0 |

Illinois' 22nd representative district election results, 1992
| Party | Candidate | Votes | % |
|---|---|---|---|
| Democratic | Michael J. Madigan | 34,482 | 75.08 |
| Republican | Stanley J. Gruca | 11,448 | 24.92 |
| Total votes | | 45,930 | 100.0 |

=== 1994 ===
Illinois' 22nd representative district election results, 1994
| Party | Candidate | Votes | % |
|---|---|---|---|
| Democratic | Michael J. Madigan (incumbent) | 24,900 | 74.92 |
| Republican | John J. Schultz | 8,335 | 25.08 |
| Total votes | | 33,235 | 100.0 |

=== 1996 ===
Illinois' 22nd representative district election results, 1996
| Party | Candidate | Votes | % |
|---|---|---|---|
| Democratic | Michael J. Madigan (incumbent) | 31,049 | 80.23 |
| Republican | Terrence F. Goggin | 7,651 | 19.77 |
| Total votes | | 38,700 | 100.0 |

=== 1998 ===
Illinois' 22nd representative district election results, 1998
| Party | Candidate | Votes | % |
|---|---|---|---|
| Democratic | Michael J. Madigan (incumbent) | 24,981 | 83.27 |
| Republican | Terrence F. Goggin | 5,020 | 16.73 |
| Total votes | | 30,001 | 100.0 |

=== 2000 ===
Illinois' 22nd representative district election results, 2000
| Party | Candidate | Votes | % |
|---|---|---|---|
| Democratic | Michael J. Madigan (incumbent) | 28,351 | 82.75 |
| Republican | Terrence F. Goggin | 5,910 | 17.25 |
| Total votes | | 34,261 | 100.0 |

=== 2002 ===
Illinois' 22nd representative district election results, 2002
| Party | Candidate | Votes | % |
|---|---|---|---|
| Democratic | Michael J. Madigan (incumbent) | 19,742 | 71.67 |
| Republican | Terrence F. Goggin | 7,802 | 28.33 |
| Total votes | | 27,544 | 100.0 |

=== 2004 ===
Illinois' 22nd representative district election results, 2004
| Party | Candidate | Votes | % |
|---|---|---|---|
| Democratic | Michael J. Madigan (incumbent) | 26,670 | 77.83 |
| Republican | Darleen A. Conners | 7,596 | 22.17 |
| Total votes | | 34,266 | 100.0 |

=== 2006 ===
Illinois' 22nd representative district election results, 2006
| Party | Candidate | Votes | % |
|---|---|---|---|
| Democratic | Michael J. Madigan (incumbent) | 20,216 | 83.06 |
| Republican | Robert P. Famiglietti | 4,122 | 16.94 |
| Total votes | | 24,338 | 100.0 |

=== 2008 ===
Illinois' 22nd representative district election results, 2008
| Party | Candidate | Votes | % |
|---|---|---|---|
| Democratic | Michael J. Madigan (incumbent) | 27,233 | 79.82 |
| Republican | Robert P. Famiglietti | 6,887 | 20.18 |
| Total votes | | 34,120 | 100.0 |

=== 2010 ===
Illinois' 22nd representative district election results, 2010
| Party | Candidate | Votes | % |
|---|---|---|---|
| Democratic | Michael J. Madigan (incumbent) | 15,599 | 67.20 |
| Republican | Patrick John Ryan | 7,614 | 32.80 |
| Total votes | | 23,213 | 100.0 |

=== 2012 ===
Illinois' 22nd representative district Democratic primary results, 2012
| Party | Candidate | Votes | % |
|---|---|---|---|
| Democratic | Michael J. Madigan (incumbent) | 9,860 | 75.72 |
| Democratic | Michele J. Piszczor | 2,232 | 17.14 |
| Democratic | Olivia Trejo | 582 | 4.47 |
| Democratic | Mike Rodriguez | 347 | 2.66 |
| Total votes | | 13,021 | 100.0 |

Illinois' 22nd representative district election results, 2012
| Party | Candidate | Votes | % |
|---|---|---|---|
| Democratic | Michael J. Madigan (incumbent) | 21,755 | 76.73 |
| Republican | Robert Handzik | 6,599 | 23.27 |
| Total votes | | 28,354 | 100.0 |

=== 2014 ===
Illinois' 22nd representative district election results, 2014
| Party | Candidate | Votes | % |
|---|---|---|---|
| Democratic | Michael J. Madigan (incumbent) | 16,956 | 100.0 |
| Total votes | | 16,956 | 100.0 |

=== 2016 ===
Illinois' 22nd representative district Democratic primary results, 2016
| Party | Candidate | Votes | % |
|---|---|---|---|
| Democratic | Michael J. Madigan (incumbent) | 17,155 | 65.18 |
| Democratic | Jason Gonzales | 7,124 | 27.07 |
| Democratic | Grasiela Rodriguez | 1,523 | 5.79 |
| Democratic | Joe G. Barboza | 518 | 1.97 |
| Total votes | | 26,320 | 100.0 |

Illinois' 22nd representative district election results, 2016
| Party | Candidate | Votes | % |
|---|---|---|---|
| Democratic | Michael J. Madigan (incumbent) | 27,715 | 100.0 |
| Total votes | | 27,715 | 100.0 |

=== 2018 ===
Illinois' 22nd representative district election results, 2018
| Party | Candidate | Votes | % |
|---|---|---|---|
| Democratic | Michael J. Madigan (incumbent) | 21,619 | 100.0 |
| Total votes | | 21,619 | 100.0 |

=== 2020 ===
Illinois' 22nd representative district Democratic primary results, 2020
| Party | Candidate | Votes | % |
|---|---|---|---|
| Democratic | Michael J. Madigan (incumbent) | 13,740 | 99.99 |
| Write-in | | 1 | 0.01 |
| Total votes | | 13,741 | 100.0 |

Illinois' 22nd representative district election results, 2020
| Party | Candidate | Votes | % |
|---|---|---|---|
| Democratic | Michael J. Madigan (incumbent) | 29,041 | 99.98 |
| Write-in | | 6 | 0.02 |
| Total votes | | 29,047 | 100.0 |
