= Neil Hartigan =

American politician and attorney

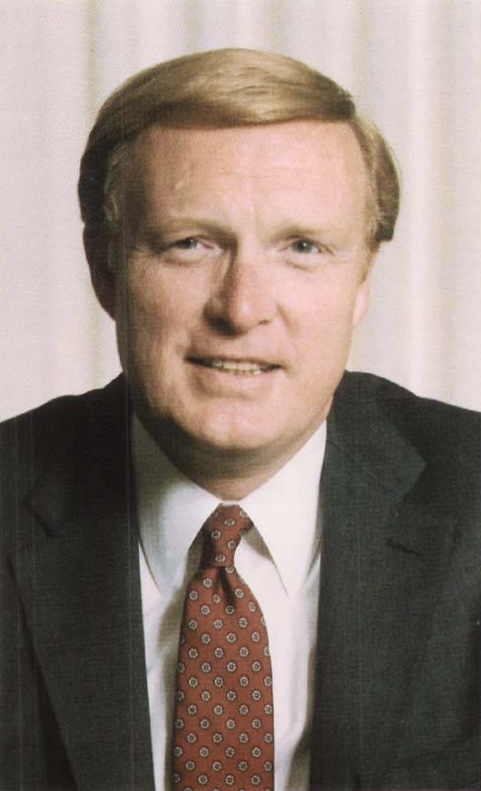
- Official portrait, 1980s

Judge of the Illinois First District Appellate Court
- In office December 2, 2002 – June 1, 2004
- Preceded by: Robert Chapman Buckley
- Succeeded by: P. Scott Neville Jr.

38th Attorney General of Illinois
- In office January 12, 1983 – January 14, 1991
- Governor: Jim Thompson
- Preceded by: Tyrone C. Fahner
- Succeeded by: Roland Burris

40th Lieutenant Governor of Illinois
- In office January 8, 1973 – January 10, 1977
- Governor: Dan Walker
- Preceded by: Paul Simon
- Succeeded by: Dave O'Neal

Personal details
- Born: Cornelius Francis Hartigan; May 4, 1938 (age 88) Chicago, Illinois, U.S.
- Party: Democratic
- Spouse: Marge Dunne (died 2003)
- Parents: David L. Hartigan (father); Coletta Hogan (mother)
- Education: Georgetown University (BS); Loyola University Chicago (JD)

Cornelius Francis Hartigan (born May 4, 1938) is an American politician, attorney, and jurist. A member of the Democratic Party, he served as the 38th Attorney General of Illinois from 1983 to 1991 and as the 40th Lieutenant Governor of Illinois from 1973 to 1977. Hartigan was also the Democratic nominee for Governor of Illinois in the 1990 election.

Hartigan began his career as a protégé of Mayor Richard J. Daley, serving in various administrative and legal roles within the Chicago city government. Elected the Lieutenant Governor of Illinois in 1972, he held the office for one term under Dan Walker. As the running mate of Michael Howlett, he lost reelection in the 1976 landslide.

After a brief period in the private sector, Hartigan successfully ran for Attorney General of Illinois in 1982, defeating the Republican incumbent, Tyrone C. Fahner. An advocate for consumers' rights and environmental protection, he won reelection by a wide margin in the 1986 election. As the Democratic nominee for governor in 1990, Hartigan narrowly lost the race to Republican Jim Edgar.

Following his defeat, Hartigan embarked on a career in the judiciary. Elected to the Illinois Appellate Court in 2002, he heard cases from the Cook County district. He voluntarily retired in 2004. Appointed by Governor Pat Quinn, he went on to serve on the Illinois Court of Claims from 2013 to 2019.

== Early life and education ==
Born into an Irish Catholic family, Hartigan grew up in Chicago's Rogers Park neighborhood. Attending Loyola Academy in nearby Wilmette, he went on to graduate from Georgetown University in 1959. Hartigan received his law degree from Loyola University Chicago in 1962.

The Hartigan family was involved in Chicago Democratic politics. Hartigan's father, David, worked for the city government. David also briefly served as City Treasurer of Chicago under Mayor Martin H. Kennelly from 1954 to 1955, and later represented the 49th ward from 1955 until his death in 1959. In addition, Hartigan's paternal uncle, Matthew, was a longtime judge in Chicago.

== Early career ==
Following law school and until his election as Lieutenant Governor of Illinois in 1972, Hartigan worked for the City of Chicago.

A protégé of Mayor Richard J. Daley, Hartigan served in the mayor's office as an administrative assistant. He was in charge of the city's liquor licensing and was Daley's lobbyist in the Illinois General Assembly. In addition, Hartigan was the attorney for the Chicago Board of Health and the general counsel for the Chicago Park District.

In 1968, Hartigan was elected the Democratic Committeeman from Chicago's 49th ward. He held this local party position until 1980, when he chose not to seek reelection.

== Lieutenant Governor of Illinois ==
In 1971, Paul Simon recruited Hartigan to run alongside him as lieutenant governor in the 1972 election. During the primary, Simon and Hartigan were supported by the state Democratic party. Nevertheless, Simon lost in an upset to Dan Walker, a political outsider. However, since the primaries were separate, Hartigan was able to defeat Walker's preferred running mate.

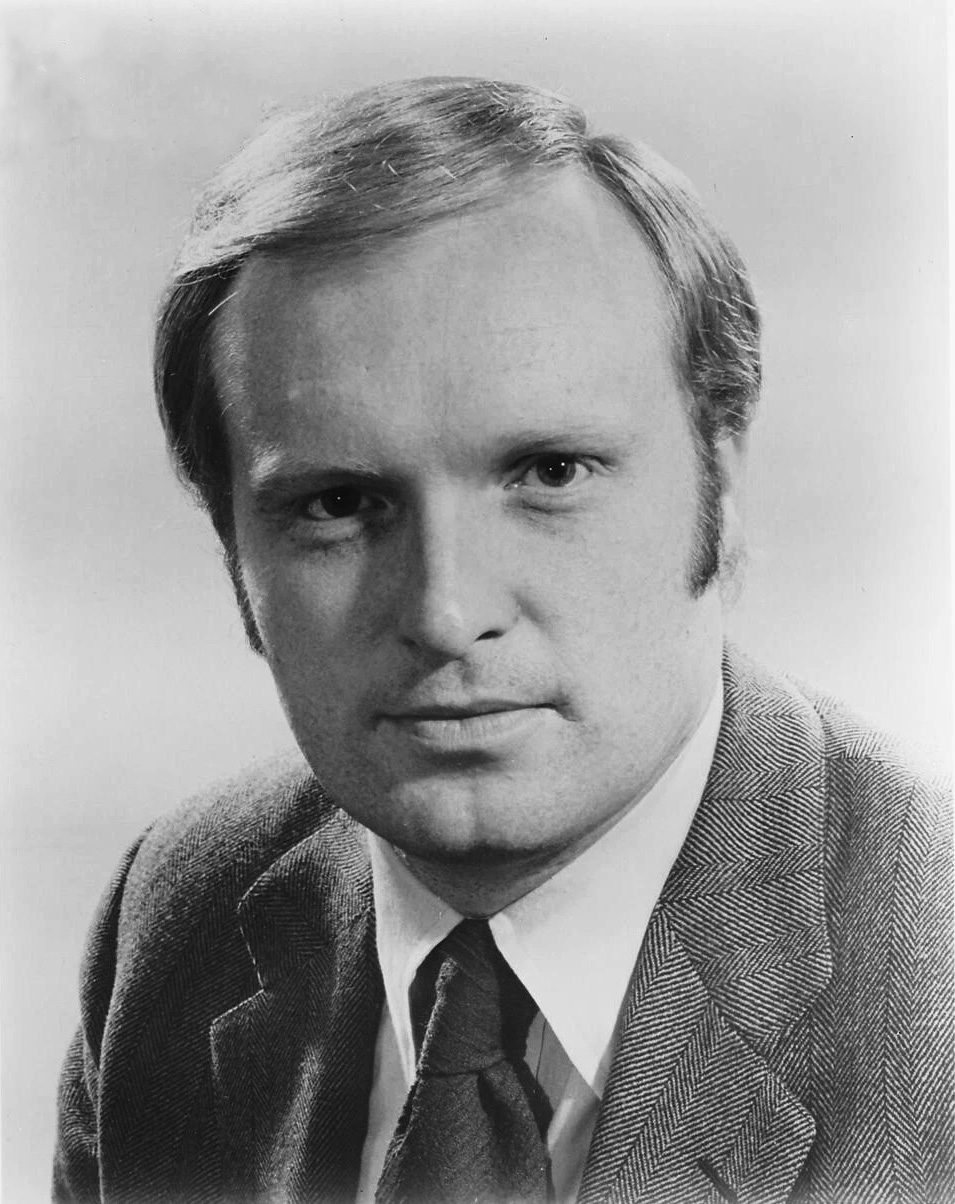
Hartigan as Lieutenant Governor, c. 1973

During the general election, the combined Walker-Hartigan ticket narrowly defeated incumbent Republican governor Richard B. Ogilvie and his running mate. But, upon taking office, Hartigan and Walker had a tense relationship due to Walker's anti-establishment beliefs. Despite this, during his tenure, Hartigan helped establish the Illinois Department on Aging, a first-of-its-kind state agency to consolidate government programs for the elderly.

Running for reelection in 1976, Hartigan won renomination, but Walker lost the primary to Secretary of State Michael Howlett. During the general election, Howlett and Hartigan lost in a landslide to Republican nominees Jim Thompson and Dave O'Neal. A Democrat did not hold the lieutenant governor position again until 2003.

== Attorney General of Illinois ==
For a time, Hartigan left public office for the business world. Returning to run for attorney general in 1982, he defeated Tyrone C. Fahner, the Republican incumbent. As attorney general, Hartigan helped pass the 1983 Illinois Violent Crime Victims Assistance Act, which uses the fines paid by convicted criminals to fund non-profits supporting survivors of violent crime. He was also involved in lawsuits protecting disabled persons, consumers, and the environment.

Hartigan initially ran for governor in the 1986 election. However, when Adlai Stevenson III entered the Democratic primary, Hartigan dropped out and endorsed Stevenson. Opting to run for reelection as attorney general, he won by a wide margin, winning with the highest number of votes of any statewide office that year.

Hartigan ran for governor again in the 1990 election, winning the Democratic nomination unopposed. A moderate Democrat, he opposed making the state's temporary income tax increase permanent during the campaign. Hartigan lost the general election to Secretary of State Jim Edgar by a narrow margin of 80,000 votes out of the over 3.2 million cast.

== Later years ==
Following his defeat, Hartigan served as Chairman of the World Trade Center Illinois and worked for a law firm. In 1997, Hartigan was appointed by President Bill Clinton to serve on the board of directors of the Federal Home Loan Mortgage Corporation.

After leaving statewide office, Hartigan has also remained involved in politics. On a national level, he was an active supporter of Hillary Clinton's 2008 presidential campaign and, alongside other former state attorneys general, he endorsed Joe Biden during the 2020 presidential election.

In 2002, Hartigan won election to the Illinois Appellate Court from the First District, which covers Cook County. After two years, he chose to retire voluntarily from the bench. On March 22, 2013, Governor Pat Quinn appointed Hartigan to the Illinois Court of Claims. He served on the court from 2013 until 2019.

Party political offices
Preceded by Paul Simon	Democratic nominee for Lieutenant Governor of Illinois; 1972, 1976	Succeeded by Dick Durbin
Preceded by Richard J. Troy	Democratic nominee for Attorney General of Illinois; 1982, 1986	Succeeded by Roland Burris
Vacant Title last held by Adlai Stevenson III	Democratic nominee for Governor of Illinois; 1990	Succeeded by Dawn Clark Netsch
Legal offices
Preceded by Tyrone C. Fahner	Attorney General of Illinois; 1983–1991	Succeeded by Roland Burris
Political offices
Preceded by Paul Simon	Lieutenant Governor of Illinois; 1973 – 1977	Succeeded by Dave O'Neal
