= Edward Vrdolyak =

American politician and lawyer

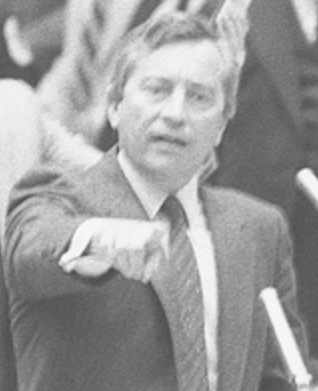
- Vrdolyak in 1983

Member of the Chicago City Council for Chicago's 10th ward
- In office 1971–1987
- Preceded by: John J. Buchanan
- Succeeded by: Victor Vrdolyak

President of the Chicago City Council
- In office 1977–1983

Chairman of the Cook County Democratic Party
- In office 1982–1987
- Preceded by: George Dunne
- Succeeded by: George Dunne

Personal details
- Born: Edward Robert Vrdolyak; December 28, 1937 (age 88) Chicago, Illinois, U.S.
- Party: Republican (1987–present)
- Other political affiliations: Illinois Solidarity (1987); Democratic (until 1987)
- Education: Mount Carmel High School; St. Joseph's College; University of Chicago Law School

Edward Robert Vrdolyak (/vərˈdoʊli.æk/; born December 28, 1937), also known as "Fast Eddie", is a former American politician and lawyer. He was a longtime Chicago alderman and the head of the Cook County Democratic Party until 1987 when he ran unsuccessfully for Mayor of Chicago on the Illinois Solidarity Party ticket. He subsequently ran again in 1989 on the Republican Party ticket. He was a prominent opponent of Harold Washington and the de facto leader of the so-called "Vrdolyak 29" that opposed and blocked many of Washington's measures.

After his electoral career ended, he resumed his law practice at The Vrdolyak Law Group. He surrendered his law license in 2009 after pleading guilty to conspiracy to commit mail fraud. The firm consists of 20 attorneys. Vrdolyak's three sons are partners in the firm.

== Early life and family ==
Vrdolyak, born to Croatian immigrant parents, entered a Catholic seminary at age 13, but decided against joining the priesthood. He graduated from Mount Carmel High School in Chicago, then from St. Joseph's College in Rensselaer, Indiana. He received his J.D. degree from the University of Chicago Law School in 1963 and began a legal career in private practice, specializing in personal injury cases.

Vrdolyak's brother, Victor Vrdolyak (1933-1992), would also serve as a Chicago alderman (being elected in 1987 to succeed Edward on the city council).

== Early political career ==
In 1968, Vrdolyak was elected as Democratic committeeman from Chicago's 10th ward in the Hegewisch and South Deering areas; a position he continued to hold until 1988.

== Chicago City Council ==
=== First and second terms (1971–79) ===
In 1971, he was elected alderman, and, after defeating Republican Melvin Simonovich, he served as President of the City Council from 1977 to 1983. Vrdolyak earned the nickname "Fast Eddie" because of his skill in back-room deal-making.

==== 1974 county assessor campaign ====
In 1974, Vrdolyak unsuccessfully ran for Cook County Assessor. Originally, the Democratic incumbent P. J. Cullerton had been intending to seek re-election. However, Vrdolyak led an effort to have Cullerton denied slating (endorsement ahead of the primary election) by the Cook County Democratic Party organization, and Cullerton decided to forgo re-election and endorsed the candidacy of Tom Tully. Tully was able to secure the county party slating, but Vrdolyak opted to run against him in the primary. While Vrdolyak was widely regarded as the front-runner to win the primary, Tully defeated him by a large margin.

=== Third term (1979–83) ===
Vrdolyak was the campaign manager of Mayor Michael A. Bilandic's re-election bid in 1979. In a colossal upset, Bilandic narrowly lost the Democratic primary to maverick challenger Jane Byrne. After she took office as mayor, Byrne stripped Vrdolyak of all his powers as council president. However, over the course of her term as mayor, he came to be Byrne's chief ally against both independent and Regular Democrats, and was ultimately made her floor leader in the Council. In 1982, with Byrne's support, he was elected Chairman of the Cook County Democratic Party, ousting County Board President George Dunne.

=== Fourth term and the "Council Wars" (1983–1987) ===
Vrdolyak is most noted for leading the City Council opposition to Mayor Harold Washington from 1983 to 1987. After Washington defeated Mayor Byrne and Richard M. Daley in the 1983 Democratic mayoral primary, he won the general election by 47,549 votes. A solid majority of the council formed the "Vrdolyak 29" (27 Regular Democrats and two independents) in opposition to Washington. These 27 aldermen outnumbered the 21 aldermen who aligned with the mayor. Vrdolyak and 14th Ward Alderman Edward M. Burke led the opposition group. The Vrdolyak 29 rejected mayoral appointments and appropriations, but could not override the mayor's veto. The resulting political deadlock was labeled "Council Wars".

In 1986, a federal lawsuit forced the redrawing of some aldermanic wards, and special elections in some, but not all, of the redrawn wards. Members of the Vrdolyak 29 were incumbents in all seven of the wards going to the polls. Four of them did not seek reelection, including three who sought seats on the county board. Two of the three attempting to retain their seats were reelected in the first round, but a third, Alderman Brady, lost six weeks later in a run-off; the council was split 25-25, creating a tie which the mayor could break. At this point, several of the Vrdolyak 29 began to support Washington, giving him a supportive council.

== 1987 mayoral campaign ==
In 1987, Vrdolyak resigned as county Democratic chairman, and ran for mayor as the Solidarity Party nominee, defeating a candidate backed by Washington in the primary. He was defeated by Washington, who got 54% of the vote to Vrdolyak's 42%.

== 1988 Clerk of Courts campaign ==
Washington's second term began more smoothly, but he unexpectedly died in November 1987 and Vrdolyak's political clout waned. In light of these factors, as well as his growing unpopularity among Democrats, Vrdolyak joined the Republican Party in September 1987. In 1988, Vrdolyak was the Republican nominee for Clerk of the Circuit Court of Cook County. He received 41% of the vote; Democrat Aurelia Pucinski (daughter of Alderman and former US Representative Roman Pucinski) won with 59%.

== 1989 mayoral campaign ==
In 1989, Vrdolyak again ran for mayor, in a special election for the last half of Washington's unexpired term; he won the Republican primary as a write-in candidate. The general election was won by Democrat Richard M. Daley. Vrdolyak managed less than 4% of the vote, effectively ending his political career.

== Later career ==
After his final electoral defeat, Vrdolyak returned to his law practice. He hosted a popular talk radio show from 1993 to 1996, first on WLS radio (890 AM) and then on WJJD Radio (1160 AM). He also maintained a strong behind-the-scenes presence in Chicago area politics. He became best known for his influence in the appointment and election of Cook County Circuit Court judges. Illinois Supreme Court Justice Charles Freeman confirmed that at least two judges he appointed to the bench were recommended by Vrdolyak. This would cause problems for Vrdolyak as he was implicated in the case of former Cook County Circuit Court Judge George J.W. Smith, who pled guilty to federal charges of illegally structuring cash withdrawals to avoid tax penalties. Prosecutors claimed the transactions were in furtherance of an alleged bribe paid to a "go-between" in order to secure Smith's appointment. Smith was reportedly appointed by Freeman based on Vrdolyak's recommendation, leading to speculation that Vrdolyak was the alleged "go-between". The investigation did not result in charges of wrongdoing against Vrdolyak, nor in bribery charges against Smith or any other party.

Vrdolyak was also a key adviser to Betty Loren-Maltese, former Town President of the Chicago suburb of Cicero. The Vrdolyak Law Group received millions of dollars in legal work from the town during the administrations of Loren-Maltese and her successor, Ramiro González. Maltese was convicted of corruption in 2002 and González was defeated in the 2005 election. While Vrdolyak was not charged in the Loren-Maltese investigation, his close alliance with the once-imprisoned former Town President was a major issue in the 2005 election. During the campaign, Dominick criticized what he called Vrdolyak's excessive legal bills, and removed Vrdolyak's firm as the town's legal counsel after taking office. However, NBC Chicago reported that the new town attorney, Michael Del Galdo, billed the town over $2 million in 2006—more than twice the average billings when Vrdolyak's firm held the contract.

In 2005, Vrdolyak agreed to a 30-day suspension of his law license for allegedly double-billing clients he represented in sexual harassment cases.

== Federal indictments and convictions ==
On May 10, 2007, Vrdolyak was indicted by a federal grand jury on charges of bribery, mail fraud and wire fraud. Prosecutors later added additional wire fraud charges, and the final indictment included a total of eight counts. The case centered on property that was sold by the Chicago Medical School. The key witness against Vrdolyak was to be Stuart Levine, a partner in the alleged scheme. Prosecutors charged that Vrdolyak and Levine devised a scheme to use Levine's position on the school's board to steer the $15 million sale of a school building to Smithfield Properties - a developer with ties to Vrdolyak. It was alleged that the two arranged a $1.5 million kickback from Smithfield to Vrdolyak in return for Levine's support.

Levine, a close friend and political ally of Vrdolyak, was indicted in 2005 for using his positions on the Illinois Teachers Retirement System board and the Illinois Health Facilities board to obtain kickbacks. Levine pleaded guilty in late 2006 and agreed to testify in several corruption cases as a condition of his plea agreement. Prosecutors dropped 22 felony charges in return for his cooperation. Prosecutors have indicated that Levine wore a recording device while discussing some of the alleged schemes. Political insiders expressed surprise at the idea that Vrdolyak would be caught on tape. A long-time power broker and target of investigations, the notoriously careful Vrdolyak has been quoted as saying that he "talk[s] to everyone like they're wearing a wire, even my wife". Chicago alderman Bernard Stone noted that Vrdolyak was always careful when talking on the phone, once telling Stone to "always talk like the government was on the phone with you".

Vrdolyak initially pleaded not guilty to all charges. Vrdolyak's attorney, Michael Monico, questioned Levine's "credibility, reliability and truthfulness", noting that he agreed to testify under "immense pressure" from prosecutors. Levine also testified at the 2008 trial of Tony Rezko, another powerbroker in Illinois politics. He told the jury that he funneled payoffs for clients who wanted Chicago city contracts through Vrdolyak, including some alleged schemes for which Vrdolyak has not been charged. Monico called Levine's statements in regards to Vrdolyak "absolutely false" and said that he had never heard them before.

The trial was set for November 3, 2008. That day, however, an agreement was reached in which prosecutors dropped several of the charges and Vrdolyak pleaded guilty to a reduced charge of conspiracy to commit mail and wire fraud. The plea agreement stated that Vrdolyak was not cooperating with other investigations, and prosecutors recommended a sentence of 41 months in prison. However, on February 26, 2009, United States District Judge Milton I. Shadur sentenced Vrdolyak to five years of probation, a $50,000 fine and 2,500 hours of community service. On January 29, 2010, a federal appeals court overturned the probation sentence on appeal by the prosecution and ordered a resentencing by a different judge. On October 15, 2010 Vrdolyak was sentenced to 10 months in prison. Vrdolyak served his sentence at the federal prison camp in Terre Haute, Indiana. He was released from prison on November 17, 2011.

On November 15, 2016, Vrdolyak was indicted for income tax evasion. He pled guilty on March 4, 2019. Vrdolyak was sentenced to eighteen months in prison for the scheme. Judge Robert Michael Dow Jr. ordered Vrdolyak to report to FMC Rochester by November 30, 2021 to complete his eighteen month sentence. In January 2022, his attorneys filed an emergency petition requesting his release for time served due to the health risks posed by the SARS-CoV-2 Omicron variant. In April 2022, after serving five months in the Rochester federal prison, Vrdolyak was transferred to a halfway house. On March 9, 2023, Vrdolyak was released from the halfway house

== See also ==
- List of Chicago aldermen since 1923
