= Illinois Solidarity Party =

Former political party in United States

- Founder: Adlai Stevenson III
- Founded: 1986; 40 years ago
- Dissolved: 1992; 34 years ago
- Headquarters: Chicago, Illinois
- Presidential candidate: Lenora Fulani (1988, 1992)
- Ideology: Anti-LaRouche movement Liberalism

The Illinois Solidarity Party was an American political party in the state of Illinois. It was named after Lech Wałęsa's Solidarity movement in Poland, which was then widely admired in Illinois because of its very large Polish-American population, especially around Chicago.

The party was founded in 1986 by Senator Adlai Stevenson III in reaction to the Democratic Party's nomination of two followers of Lyndon LaRouche in the race for high state offices: Mark Fairchild, who was running for Lieutenant Governor, and Janice Hart, who was running for Illinois Secretary of State. Stevenson, a Democratic candidate for Illinois Governor, did not want to run alongside anybody associated with LaRouche's organization.

The Solidarity Party continued to exist, unaffiliated with Stevenson, after the 1986 election. In the 1987 Chicago mayoral election, Edward Vrdolyak ran for mayor of Chicago on the Illinois Solidarity Party ticket, which provided the major opposition to incumbent Harold Washington, Chicago's first African-American mayor. Vrdolyak lost to Washington by a final tally of 53%–43%.

The party's continued existence afterward made it an easy target for other small political parties to "take over" whenever necessary. One such group was the New Alliance Party (NAP), which was largely unknown in Illinois but still managed to run some of its candidates for local offices. The NAP founder Lenora Fulani campaigned as a Solidarity Party presidential candidate in 1988 and 1992.

== Electoral history ==
=== President ===
| Year | Candidate | Popular vote | % | Pos. | Result | Ref. |
|---|---|---|---|---|---|---|
| 1988 | Lenora Fulani; Joyce Dattner | 10,276 | 0.22% | 4th | Lost | |

=== Congressional elections ===
| Year | Chamber | District | Candidate | Popular vote | % | Pos. | Result | Ref. |
|---|---|---|---|---|---|---|---|---|
| 1986 | Senate | —N/a | Einar V. Dyhrkopp | 15,804 | 0.50% | 3rd | Lost | |
| 1988 | House of Representatives | 9th | Jessie Fields | 2,000 | 0.97% | 3rd | Lost | |
| 1990 | House of Representatives | 5th | Ronald "Ron" Bartos | 3,001 | 2.69% | 3rd | Lost | |
| 1990 | House of Representatives | 10th | Herbert L. Gorrell | 2,243 | 1.46% | 3rd | Lost | |
| 1990 | House of Representatives | 11th | Larry Saska | 2,692 | 1.74% | 3rd | Lost | |
| 1990 | House of Representatives | 12th | Steve Pedersen | 24,450 | 17.77% | 2nd | Lost | |
| 1990 | House of Representatives | 15th | Brian James O'Neill II | 2,250 | 1.30% | 3rd | Lost | |

=== Statewide elections ===
| Year | Office | Candidate | Popular vote | % | Pos. | Result | Ref. |
|---|---|---|---|---|---|---|---|
| 1986 | Governor | Adlai Stevenson III; Mike Howlett | 1,256,626 | 39.96% | 2nd | Lost | |
| 1986 | Attorney General | John Ray Keith | 33,702 | 1.08% | 3rd | Lost | |
| 1986 | Secretary of State | Jane N. Spirgel | 521,410 | 16.70% | 2nd | Lost | |
| 1986 | Comptroller | A. Patricia Scott | 78,389 | 2.55% | 3rd | Lost | |
| 1986 | Treasurer | William E. Skedd | 50,570 | 1.64% | 3rd | Lost | |
| 1986 | University of Illinois trustees | Elena Mulcahy | 108,337 | 1.29% | 7th | Lost | |
| 1986 | University of Illinois trustees | James S. Spencer | 102,419 | 1.22% | 8th | Lost | |
| 1986 | University of Illinois trustees | Philip Martin | 92,253 | 1.10% | 9th | Lost | |
| 1988 | University of Illinois trustees | Martin C. Ortega | 97,887 | 0.82% | 9th | Lost | |
| 1988 | University of Illinois trustees | Alan Port | 61,935 | 0.52% | 11th | Lost | |
| 1990 | Governor | Jessie Fields; Marisellis Brown | 35,067 | 1.07% | 3rd | Lost | |
| 1990 | University of Illinois trustees | Martin C. Ortega | 226,103 | 2.69% | 7th | Lost | |

=== Legislative elections ===
| Year | Chamber | District | Candidate | Popular vote | % | Pos. | Result | Ref. |
|---|---|---|---|---|---|---|---|---|
| 1988 | Senate | 15th | Bernard Cole | 942 | 1.10% | 3rd | Lost | |
| 1988 | Senate | 21st | Earl N. Smith | 780 | 0.95% | 3rd | Lost | |
| 1988 | House of Representatives | 26th | Chuck Edmonds | 310 | 0.94% | 3rd | Lost | |
| 1988 | House of Representatives | 30th | Edward O'Malley | 683 | 1.60% | 3rd | Lost | |
| 1988 | House of Representatives | 42nd | Vernell Smith | 352 | 0.94% | 3rd | Lost | |
| 1988 | House of Representatives | 76th | Robert Hugh Lee | 2,415 | 7.48% | 2nd | Lost | |
| 1990 | House of Representatives | 30th | Stanley J. Gruca | 564 | 1.73% | 3rd | Lost | |

=== Judicial elections ===
| Year | Court | Candidate | Popular vote | % | Pos. | Result | Ref. |
|---|---|---|---|---|---|---|---|
| 1988 | Circuit Court of Cook County | Patrick J. O'Malley | 94,642 | 12.01% | 2nd | Lost | |

=== Local elections ===
| Year | Area | Office | Candidate | Popular vote | % | Pos. | Result | Ref. |
|---|---|---|---|---|---|---|---|---|
| 1987 | Chicago | Mayor | Edward Vrdolyak | 468,493 | 41.96% | 2nd | Lost | |
| 1988 | Cook County | Recorder of Deeds | Edward M. Wojkowski | 62,968 | 3.35% | 3rd | Lost | |
| 1990 | Cook County | Sheriff | William M. Piecuch, Sr. | 7,648 | 1.41% | 4th | Lost | |

== See also ==
- 1986 Illinois elections
- 1986 Illinois gubernatorial election
- 1987 Chicago mayoral election
