= Adlai Stevenson III =

American attorney and politician (1930–2021)

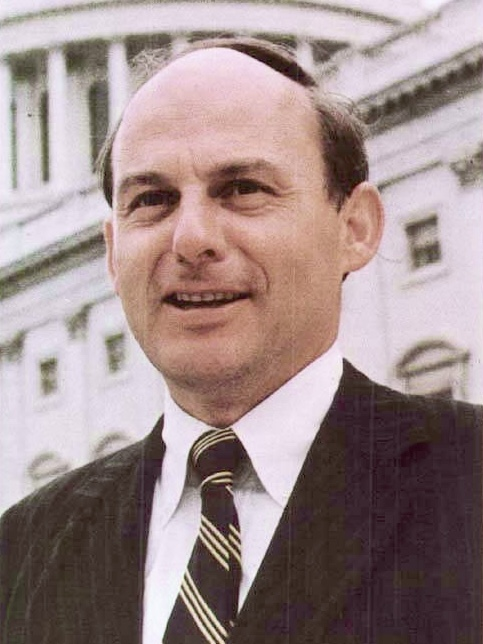
- Official portrait, 1977

United States Senator from Illinois
- In office November 17, 1970 – January 3, 1981
- Preceded by: Ralph T. Smith
- Succeeded by: Alan J. Dixon

63rd Treasurer of Illinois
- In office January 9, 1967 – November 17, 1970
- Governor: Otto Kerner Jr. Samuel Shapiro; Richard B. Ogilvie
- Preceded by: William Scott
- Succeeded by: Charles W. Woodford

Member of the Illinois House of Representatives from the at-large district
- In office January 13, 1965 – January 11, 1967
- Preceded by: redistricting
- Succeeded by: redistricting

Personal details
- Born: Adlai Ewing Stevenson III; October 10, 1930 Chicago, Illinois, U.S.
- Died: September 6, 2021 (aged 90) Chicago, Illinois, U.S.
- Party: Democratic
- Other political affiliations: Solidarity (1986)
- Spouse: Nancy Anderson (m. 1955)
- Children: 4
- Parents: Adlai Stevenson II; Ellen Stevenson
- Relatives: Stevenson family
- Education: Harvard University (AB, LLB)

Military service
- Service: United States Marine Corps
- Years of service: 1952–1954 (active); 1954–1961 (reserve)
- Rank: Captain
- Wars: Korean War

Adlai Ewing Stevenson III (October 10, 1930 – September 6, 2021) was an American attorney and politician from Illinois. A member of the Democratic Party, he served as a member of the United States Senate from 1970 to 1981. A member of the prominent Stevenson family, he also served as a member of the Illinois House of Representatives and Illinois Treasurer. He unsuccessfully ran for governor of Illinois in 1982 and 1986. He had been awarded Japan’s Order of the Sacred Treasure with gold and silver stars and was an honorary Professor of Renmin University of China.

== Early life, education, and early career (1930–1964) ==
Adlai Stevenson III was born in Chicago to Ellen Stevenson (née Borden) and two-time Democratic Party presidential nominee Adlai Stevenson II. He attended Milton Academy in Massachusetts, Harrow School in England, and Harvard College. He received a law degree in 1957 from Harvard Law School. Stevenson was commissioned as a lieutenant in the U.S. Marine Corps in 1952, served in Korea and was discharged from active duty in 1954. He continued to serve in the Marine Reserve and was discharged in 1961 as a captain. In 1957, Stevenson went to work as a clerk for a justice of the Supreme Court of Illinois and worked there until 1958 when he joined the law firm of Brown and Platt.

== Illinois House of Representatives (1965–1967) ==
Stevenson was elected to the Illinois House of Representatives in the 1964 Illinois House of Representatives election, which was held at-large due to the state's failure to redistrict. With 2,417,978 votes, he received the most votes of any candidate (by a margin of 7,613 more votes than the next candidate). More than half of ballots cast in the statewide general election included a vote for Stevenson.

Stevenson served in the Illinois House from 1965 to 1967. During his time in the state house, he won a Best Legislator award from the Independent Voters of Illinois.

== Treasurer of Illinois (1967–1970) ==
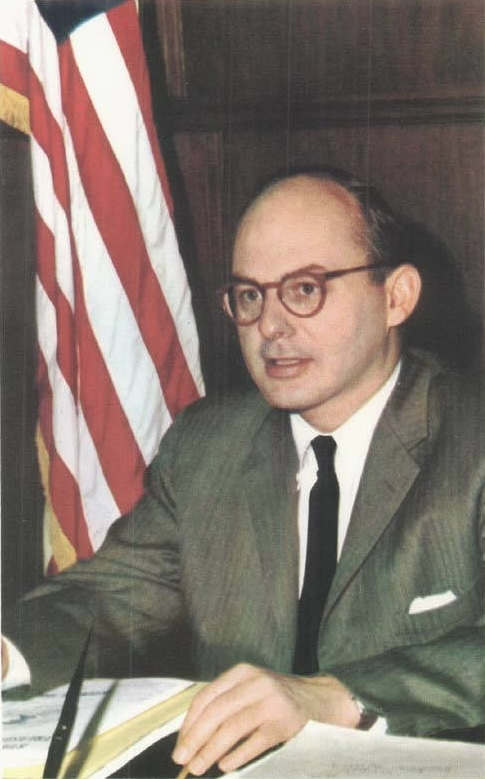
Stevenson during his tenure as state treasurer

In 1966, Stevenson was elected treasurer of Illinois. Stevenson's 1966 victory had come despite a Republican-favoring wave election in Illinois that year. As state treasurer, he quadrupled earnings on the investment of state funds while cutting the budget each year.

=== Tensions with Daley machine; Committee on Illinois Government ===
By the late-1960s, Stevenson was regarded as a leader of reform-minded (anti-establishment) politics in Illinois. He had a complicated dynamic with Mayor Richard J. Daley and the Daley-led political machine. He received Daley's support in his 1966 state treasurer campaign. In 1968, Stevenson unsuccessfully sought the political machine's slating to run for governor, but Daley preferred to support the nomination of Lieutenant Governor Sam Shapiro and his machine followed suit. Stevenson then turned his attention to running for United States Senate, but Daley and his machine instead slated State Attorney General William G. Clark. Soon after this, Stevenson spoke critically Daley publicly by faulting his handling of protesters during the 1968 Democratic National Convention in Chicago. He later accused Daley of running a "feudal" political system based upon "patronage and fear."

Stevenson formed the Committee on Illinois Government, an informal group which also included William Singer and Abner Mikva. The group began holding meetings at Stevenson's Chicago home. In September 1969, the group held a large picnic event at Stevenson's Libertyville farm to which 15,000 reform-minded individuals were invited, of whom 8,000 attended. Attendees of the event were asked to sign the Libertyville Proclamation, which would call for the Democratic Party of Illinois to "end reliance upon the purchased loyalties of patronage". Mayor Daley crashed the event by attending himself, arriving in a limosine alongside Congressman Dan Rostenkowski, Cook County Circuit Court Clerk Matt Danaher, and State Auditor Michael Howlett. He then took the stage, and delivered a speech which pandered to the reform-minded crowd by highlighting Daley's past support for political candidates they appreciated, such as Stevenson's own father, the late president John F. Kennedy, and the former senator Paul Douglas. Having been blindsided by Daley, Stevenson threw out his own prepared marks and spoke positively of the Mayor in his own impromptu speech. At the same event, South Dakota U.S. Senator George McGovern shared news to the crowd that Illinois U.S. Senator Everett Dirksen had died in office. Daley would ultimately slate Stevenson to run in the special election for his seat, pacifying Stevenson's growing resistance to his machine.

== United States Senate (1970–1981) ==
=== Elections ===
==== 1970 ====
Following the death of incumbent U.S. Senator Everett Dirksen in 1969, Stevenson ran for his seat. He faced former state representative Ralph T. Smith in the general election, who was appointed to the seat by Gov. Richard B. Ogilvie. Stevenson defeated Smith in a 1970 special election by 545,336 votes, to fill Dirksen's unexpired term.

==== 1974 ====
In 1974, Stevenson ran for re-election, and faced Republican George Burditt in the general election. He defeated Burditt by 726,612 votes.

=== Committee assignments ===
In the Senate, Stevenson served on the Commerce Committee (Chairman of the Subcommittee on Science, Technology and Space), Banking Committee (Chairman of the Subcommittee on International Finance) and Intelligence Committee (Chairman, Subcommittee on the Collection and Production of Intelligence). He was the first Chairman of the United States Senate Select Committee on Ethics charged with implementing a code of ethics he helped draft. Stevenson was also chairman of a Special Senate Committee which led the first major reorganization of the Senate since its Committee system was formed in the early 19th Century.

=== Tenure ===
Stevenson took his seat on November 17, 1970.

==== Vietnam War ====
Stevenson opposed the Vietnam War. He condemned Democratic President Lyndon B. Johnson’s Indochina policies and the violent police tactics at the 1968 Democratic National Convention in Chicago, renewed his attacks on Republican President Richard Nixon’s prosecution of the war. He also introduced legislation requiring an end to all aid to South Vietnam by June 30, 1975.

==== Watergate scandal ====
Stevenson was highly critical of Republican President Richard Nixon during the Watergate scandal. He called on Nixon to answer for the integrity of the country’s leaders. “All of us — Republicans and Democrats — have an interest in clearing the record," he said a year before Nixon resigned in disgrace. “The faith of the people in their system and their leaders — a faith that has already been shaken enough — is at stake."

==== Legislative accomplishments ====
Stevenson authored the International Banking Act of 1978, the Stevenson–Wydler Technology Innovation Act of 1980 and its companion, the Bayh–Dole Act, to foster cooperative research, organize national laboratories for technology utilization and commercialization, and permit private sector interests in government-funded research. He was the first chairman of the United States Senate Select Committee on Ethics charged with implementing a code of ethics he helped draft. Stevenson was also chairman of a special Senate committee that reorganized the Senate and served on the United States Senate Democratic Policy Committee. He also conducted the first in-depth congressional study of terrorism as chairman of the Subcommittee on the Collection and Production of Intelligence, leading to introduction of the Comprehensive Counter Terrorism Act of 1971. He warned of "spectacular acts of disruption and destruction" and an amendment that proposed reducing assistance for Israel by $200 million. His amendment received seven votes.

==== Views on Israel ====
Stevenson was initially a strong supporter of Israel, but was critical of the influence of American Israel Public Affairs Committee (AIPAC) on US politics. Stevenson had sharp differences with the Israeli lobby on issues concerning the Middle East, including a 1979 vote to cut military assistance to Israel by 10 percent and support of a 1978 weapons sale to Saudi Arabia. AIPAC also criticized his meeting with PLO leader Yasser Arafat.

In a letter to Jewish leader Hyman Bookbinder in 1980, Stevenson wrote:

"It is the Israeli lobby, led by AIPAC, which I deplore. It does not speak for all Jewry, including Israeli Jewry. Yet it exercises an inordinate degree of influence with weak public officials. I deplore their subservience to the vagaries of a foreign government."

=== 1976 Presidential election ===
==== Presidential bid ====
Stevenson was encouraged to run for president in 1976, which was fueled by Mayor Richard J. Daley of Chicago, who resented the senator’s liberal reforms, but who recognized Stevenson as being a vote-getter. The senator declined to campaign, but as the nominating process got underway, Daley forces ran him as a favorite son candidate.

==== Vice presidential finalist ====
Despite this, former governor Jimmy Carter of Georgia locked up the nomination before the 1976 Democratic National Convention, in New York City. Stevenson was, however, one of the finalists for vice president at the convention, though Carter eventually chose U.S. Senator Walter Mondale from Minnesota.

=== Retirement ===
Stevenson opted to not run for reelection in 1980 and returned to Illinois to practice law.

== Post-Senate life and career (1981–2021) ==
=== Gubernatorial bids ===
Stevenson ran for governor of Illinois in 1982 and 1986, losing both elections to James R. Thompson.

==== 1982 ====
In the 1982 campaign, Stevenson complained that Thompson was trying to portray him as an ineffectual elitist by famously stating, "He is saying 'Me tough guy,' as if to imply that I’m some kind of wimp." The initial vote count showed Stevenson winning; however, the final official count showed him losing by 0.14 percent. Stevenson promptly petitioned the Illinois Supreme Court for a recount and presented evidence of widespread election irregularities, including evidence of a failed punch card system for tabulation of votes. Three days before the gubernatorial inauguration, the court denied the recount in a 4-3 ruling, asserting that the Illinois recount statute was unconstitutional.

==== 1986 ====
In the 1986 statewide Democratic primaries, Democratic voters nominated allies of Lyndon LaRouche for lieutenant governor and secretary of state. Stevenson objected to their platform and refused to appear on the same ticket. Instead, he organized the Illinois Solidarity Party to provide an alternate slate for governor, lieutenant governor, and secretary of state, which was endorsed by Democratic Party of Illinois. Persuading Democrats to vote for most of the Democratic ticket as well as the Solidarity candidates for governor, lieutenant governor, and secretary of state was an unconventional strategy; however, Stevenson and the candidate for lieutenant governor position, Mike Howlett, won 40% of the vote.

=== Later career ===
==== Business and cultural relations ====
After leaving the Senate, Stevenson was active in business and cultural relations with East Asia. He was chairman of SC&M Investment Management Corporation, and co-chairman of HuaMei Capital Company (the first Chinese-American investment bank).

==== Non-profit organizations ====
He also held many positions with non-profit organizations in this area. He served as chairman of the National Association of Japan–America Societies Society of Chicago, the Midwest U.S.-Japan Association, and the Midwest U.S.-China Association, and as president of the U.S. Committee of the Pacific Economic Cooperation Council (PECC). He was also co-chairman of the PECC's Financial Market Development Project, a member of the U.S.-Korea Wisemen Council, and sat on the board of directors of the Korea Institute for International Economic Policy. He was also chairman of the international Adlai Stevenson Center on Democracy housed at the family home, a national historic landmark, near Libertyville. Stevenson was also a member of the ReFormers Caucus of Issue One.

==== UNPA proposal ====
On December 8, 2012, aged 82, Stevenson endorsed the proposal for the United Nations Parliamentary Assembly (UNPA), one of only six persons who served in the United States Congress ever to do so.

=== Death ===
Stevenson died from complications of Lewy body dementia at his home in Chicago on September 6, 2021, at age 90.

== Personal life ==
=== Family ===
Stevenson's great-grandfather Adlai E. Stevenson I was Vice President of the United States (1893–1897) during Grover Cleveland's second term. His grandfather Lewis Stevenson was Illinois secretary of state (1914–1917). His father, Adlai Stevenson II, was governor of Illinois, Ambassador to the United Nations, and two-time Democratic presidential nominee. Actor McLean Stevenson was his third cousin.

=== Marriage and children ===
Stevenson met his future wife, Nancy Anderson, in 1953 while he was in tank training at Fort Knox in preparation for his deployment to Japan and then Korea. The couple was married in 1955 at Nancy’s home outside of Louisville. Together, they had four children. His son Adlai Stevenson IV is a business executive and former journalist. Though Adlai IV had expressed his intention to be "Adlai the last," his son, Adlai Ewing Stevenson V, was born in the summer of 1994.

== Writings ==
- Stevenson authored The Black Book, which records American history and culture from within its politics as his family knew it over five generations, starting with his great-great-grandfather, Jesse W. Fell, who was Abraham Lincoln's patron and persuaded him to run for president.

== Awards ==
Stevenson has been honored with a number of awards, which include :

- Order of the Sacred Treasure, by the government of Japan, with gold and silver star.
- Honorary Professor of Renmin University in China.
- Laureate of the Lincoln Academy of Illinois
- Order of Lincoln by the governor of Illinois in 1981 in the area of government.

Party political offices
Preceded by Francis S. Lorenz	Democratic nominee for Treasurer of Illinois; 1966	Succeeded by Alan J. Dixon
Preceded by William G. Clark	Democratic nominee for U.S. Senator from Illinois (Class 3); 1970, 1974	Succeeded by Alan J. Dixon
Preceded by Michael Bakalis	Democratic nominee for Governor of Illinois; 1982	Vacant Title next held by Neil Hartigan
First	Illinois Solidarity nominee for Governor of Illinois; 1986	Succeeded by Jessie Fields
Political offices
Preceded by William Scott	Treasurer of Illinois; 1967–1971	Succeeded by Alan J. Dixon
U.S. Senate
Preceded by Ralph Tyler Smith	U.S. Senator (Class 3) from Illinois; 1970–1981; Served alongside: Charles H. Percy	Succeeded by Alan J. Dixon
New office	Chair of the Senate Committee System Study Committee; 1976–1977; Served alongside: Bill Brock, Bob Packwood	Position abolished
Preceded by Howard Cannon	Chair of the Senate Ethics Committee; 1977–1980	Succeeded by Howell Heflin
