= Slate (elections) =

List of candidates for an elected position

A slate, or political slate, is a group of candidates that run in multi-seat or multi-position elections on a common platform.

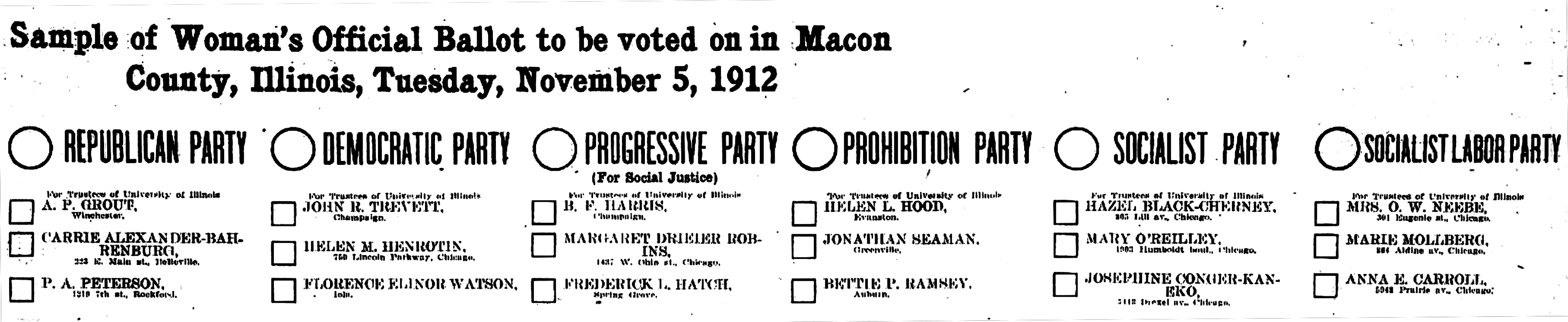
Newspaper illustration of a 1912 Macon County, Illinois, ballot for women which were only allowed to vote for trustees of the state university in Illinois at the time and in that state. Candidates are listed by political parties, and voters could choose to mark for a slate or for individuals.

The common platform may be because the candidates are all members of a political party, have the same or similar policies, or some other reason.

== Elections that commonly have slates ==
=== United States electoral college ===
The United States presidential elections use an electoral college to determine the winner and the electors are chosen by popular vote in each state. In most states, voters choose a slate of electors who support one of the candidates, although this may not be obvious to the voter at the time.

=== United States legislative elections ===
In states whose state legislatures are elected from multi-member districts, it is common for groups of candidates to form slates in primary and general elections. Elections to the Maryland General Assembly are a prime example, with most districts electing one member of the Maryland Senate and three members of the Maryland House of Delegates. Candidates for senator and delegate (usually incumbents) often join together prior to the primary election, registering their slates as separate campaign committees to enable them to raise funds separately. They are commonly called "Leadership Teams".

=== United Kingdom student unions ===
Most student unions in the United Kingdom have the places on their executive committee elected simultaneously, but separately. Groups of candidates may run together so as each candidate can campaign for themselves and the other members on the slate at the same time, thereby increasing the election material and manpower available to the group. Slates can be political (e.g. Stop the War) or non-political. However some students' unions ban the use of slates in their elections.

=== Canadian municipal elections ===
Unusual among western democracies, Canada's major federal and provincial political parties do not have municipal wings. While some of Canada's biggest cities, such as Montreal and Vancouver, have permanent political parties that have been a "slate". For members of a slate, this usually means not running against each other for the same office, purchasing advertising materials together and possibly agreeing to vote together on some issues if elected. Slates differ from political parties in that they are usually temporary arrangements that last for the election campaign only, and they have no annual meetings, headquarters or volunteers.

=== Canadian student unions ===
The use of slates by students to collectively get elected to student union positions is common. Slates are often a controversial feature of student politics in Canada, with many student associations wavering between full recognition of them to outright banning them. In bigger student unions where slates are tolerated, it is not uncommon to see these slates take on party-like features to entertain multi-year success.

Different campuses in North America are seen having groups of students creating political agendas in order to run the campus in a specific way.

=== Philippine elections ===
Political parties and coalitions employ slates in elections with multiple winners. For the nationally-elected Senate, parties and coalitions draw up 12-person slates, as there are 12 seats being contested. The same is true for local legislatures, depending on how many seats are up, where elections are done via plurality-at-large voting. Parties and coalitions issue sample ballots to prospective voters that show the candidates in their respective slates, from the Senate up to the Sangguniang Bayan (municipal council) level, encourage voters to "vote straight" their respective slates.

=== Russian elections ===
In Russia, using slates in parliamentary elections was banned in 2007, but in municipal elections they still can be used.

=== Student government elections ===
Many universities in the United States allow members of the student body to combine into slates if they share a common agenda when running for student government positions.

=== Israeli Knesset elections ===
Elections to the Knesset, Israel's unicameral legislature, are held under a closed-list party-list proportional representation system, which means that votes are cast for a slate of candidates running under the banner of a political party. Similarly to the US electoral college, the actual identities of all candidates are not obvious to the voters - the ballot design only lists the party's name and electoral symbol, and campaigning mainly revolves around the party leaders, as the prime minister would almost always be appointed from among them.

== See also ==
- Election ticket
