= Morgan M. Finley =

American politician and businessman

Morgan Martin Finley (August 31, 1925 – September 20, 2016) was an American politician and businessman.

Finley was born in Chicago, Illinois. He went to De La Salle Institute and DePaul University. Finley served in the United States Navy during World War II. Finley lived in the Bridgeport, Chicago neighborhood with his wife and family. He was involved in the real estate and insurance business. Finley served in the Illinois Senate from 1959 to 1967 and was a Democrat. He also served as clerk of the Circuit Court of Cook County. In 1989, Finley was sentenced in the United States District Court to prison for attempted extortion and racketeering.
