= Straight-ticket voting =

Voting practice supporting one party

In political science, straight-ticket voting or straight-party voting refers to the practice of voting for every candidate that a political party has on a general election ballot. In some states, ballots may offer a straight-ticket voting option, sometimes known as a master lever or group voting ticket, that allows voters to check a box and vote for all of a party's candidates, instead of voting for each race individually.

It means the voter gives a single party support to fill all the various positions open on a long ballot, and also means that in plurality block voting, the voter casts all votes for candidates of one party.

== History ==
The vast majority of ballots cast in the United States before the 1960s were straight-ticket ballots. However, straight-ticket voting experienced a steady decline through the 2000s as a result of many political factors. The drift of the Democratic Party away from its roots in the Reconstruction era's Redeemers led to the collapse of straight-ticket voting in the Solid South, as southern voters began to vote for Dixiecrats (Conservative southern Democrats) at the local level while backing Republicans at the national level. At the same time, the Democratic Party moved toward the center-right under Bill Clinton and the New Democrats. With fewer distinctions between the two parties, voters focused more on the specifics of different candidates.

However, straight-ticket voting experienced a resurgence in the 2010s. The success of the Southern strategy has resulted in Republicans dominating at all levels in the American South, and increasing political polarization has created a large ideological distance between the two parties.

== Straight-ticket voting in individual American states ==
Straight-ticket voting options differ from state to state. As of 2022, Alabama, Indiana, Kentucky, Michigan, Oklahoma, South Carolina and Nevada allow straight ticket voting, though Indiana does not allow it for at-large races. Many other states had straight-ticket options before repealing them.

=== Georgia ===
Georgia abolished straight-ticket voting in 1994.

=== Indiana ===
Indiana abolished the straight-ticket vote for at-large elections in 2016, but retains it for all other partisan races.

=== Illinois ===
Illinois abolished straight-ticket voting in 1997, when House Bill 444 was passed by both chambers of the 89th Illinois General Assembly.

=== Iowa ===
Iowa repealed its straight-ticket option in 2017.

=== Michigan ===
General-election ballots in Michigan have three sections:

- The partisan section, which includes candidates for partisan offices;
- The non-partisan section, which includes candidates for judgeships, most municipal offices, and school boards; and
- The proposals section, which includes state and local ballot issues.

Voters in Michigan have long been able to vote a straight ticket or a split ticket (voting for individual candidates in individual offices).

Straight-ticket voting only involved the partisan section of the ballot, meaning that if an individual wished to vote in a non-partisan race or for or against a proposal, they had to cast those votes individually. One area in which this issue received attention was in races for the Michigan Supreme Court. All parties on the ballot can nominate candidates for Justice of the Supreme Court at their party conventions (2–3 months before the election for primary-eligible parties, or before the August primary for alternative parties which nominate only at conventions or county caucuses). However, the races appear on the ballot in the nonpartisan section, meaning that a straight-ticket vote for either of these parties would not include a vote for that party's candidates for Supreme Court.

The Michigan Legislature passed and Governor Rick Snyder signed SB 13 on January 5, 2015, which repeals and abolishes straight-ticket voting in the state. This follows failed attempts to abolish it in 1964 and 2001-2002 after voter referendums repealing abolition. With a $5 million appropriation in SB 13, however, a voter referendum is no longer possible due to a constitutional prohibition on referendums on bills appropriating moneys by the Legislature.

In 2018, Michigan voters passed a constitutional amendment ballot proposal that restored straight-ticket voting, which went around the prohibition on appropriated money bills.

=== Missouri ===
Missouri abolished its straight-ticket voting option by passing SB661 in 2006.

=== Nevada ===
In 1975, a statute was added with contained a requirement for straight-ticket voting except at primary elections, with a further edit in 1995 which changed the restriction to exclude "a primary election or presidential preference primary election." In 2021, SB292 was introduced with wording requiring an option for straight-ticket voting for both major and minor political parties, but the bill was passed without this portion.

=== New Hampshire ===
New Hampshire abolished its straight-ticket voting option by passing SB36 in 2007. Following its passage, Ann Kaligan, Deputy Laconia City Clerk, worried about the impact on elderly voters, though others like Cindy Reinartz, a Tilton Town Clerk, believed it was for the better overall.

=== New Mexico ===
New Mexico abolished its straight-ticket voting option in 2001, though from 2002-2010 secretaries of state put the option onto ballots. In 2012, the secretary of state decided not to put the option on ballots, with the legislature attempting to reinstate it that year but the effort failed. Another effort in 2018 was initiated by the secretary of state, but a petition approved by the state supreme court prevented this.

=== North Carolina ===
North Carolina had an option for voting "straight party" (using the term from an NC ballot) that did not include a vote for the President and Vice President of the United States, through the 2012 elections. A voter ID law enacted in 2013 abolished all straight-ticket voting in the state, and went into effect in 2014. The bill eliminating it was HB 589.

Under the former system, North Carolina made separate selections for the President/Vice President and the straight-party option. This idiosyncrasy on the North Carolina ballot was described by some as "a ballot flaw," potentially resulting in voters failing to cast a vote for President and Vice President when doing so was their intent. It was introduced in the 1960s to shore up Democrats at the state level as Republicans were gaining strength at the national level. In the 2000 presidential election, there was a 3.15% "undervote" (i.e. (total voter turnout - total votes for President and Vice President) / total voter turnout); in the 2004 presidential election, there was a 2.57% undervote. This means that in raw numbers, more than 92,000 North Carolina voters in the 2000 election turned out to vote but did not vote for president; similarly, in 2004, more than 75,000 North Carolina voters turned out to vote but not vote for president.

=== Pennsylvania ===
Pennsylvania repealed its straight-ticket option in 2019. The repeal went into effect in 2020.

=== Rhode Island ===
Rhode Island passed HB 8072 in 2014, which abolished straight-ticket voting, which became effective in 2015.

=== South Dakota ===
South Dakota abolished its straight-ticket option in 1996.

=== Texas ===
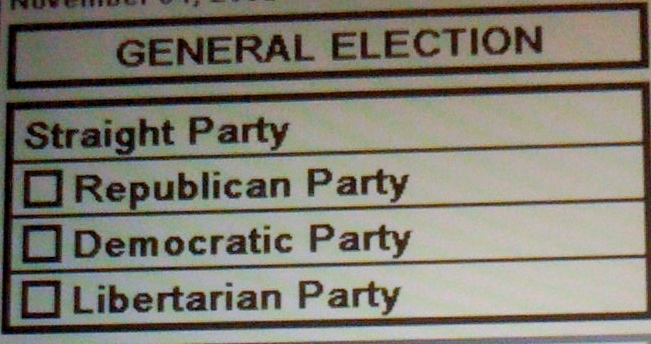
Straight-party option on Texas ballot in the 2008 general election

On June 1, 2017, Governor Greg Abbott signed into law House Bill 25, which eliminated the straight-ticket voting option in Texas for all races beginning in 2020.

Before this, a vote for a straight-party ticket cast votes for all party candidates in all races where the party was fielding a candidate and the voter was eligible to cast a vote, including the President/Vice President, Governor, county constable, and justice of the peace.

A voter, however, could vote a straight-party ticket and subsequently cast an individual vote in a particular race. This could happen in cases where

1. the voter's party did not field a candidate in a specific race, and the voter wanted to cast a vote in that race for one of the candidates from another party, and/or
2. the voter did not wish to support the party's candidate in a specific race, but wished to vote for another candidate in that race. However, Texas did not have a "none of the above" option, in cases where a voter wished not to vote for any candidate in a race where his/her party was fielding one, the voter could not choose the straight-party option. In some Texas counties, an individual vote would not override the straight-party vote: If a voter chose the straight-party option, then voted for a single candidate from another party, votes for that race were recorded for both candidates.

Straight-party voting was available only in the general election for partisan elections. It was not available for:

- party primary elections
- non-partisan races (such as City Council or School Board elections); even if a slate of candidates was endorsed by a particular group the slate could be elected on a single ticket, each candidate had to be selected individually.
- ballot issues (such as an amendment to the Texas Constitution or a measure to approve bonds and assess taxes for their repayment), even if a political party officially endorsed or opposed such an amendment.

In those cases where a partisan election was combined with a non-partisan election and/or ballot issues, the voter could vote straight-party in the partisan portion, but then had to vote individually in the other portion(s).

=== Utah ===
Utah repealed its straight-ticket option in 2020.

=== West Virginia ===
In West Virginia, voting "straight party" included a vote for all candidates of the party voters selected, including the President and Vice President of the United States. Non-partisan candidates had to be voted separately. In 2015, however, straight-ticket voting was eliminated as an option on ballots through an Act of the State Legislature signed by Governor Earl Ray Tomblin, SB 249.

=== Wisconsin ===
Wisconsin offered its straight-ticket option in 2011, which was effective for the November 2024 elections, and it remains available for UOCAVA voters.

=== Others ===
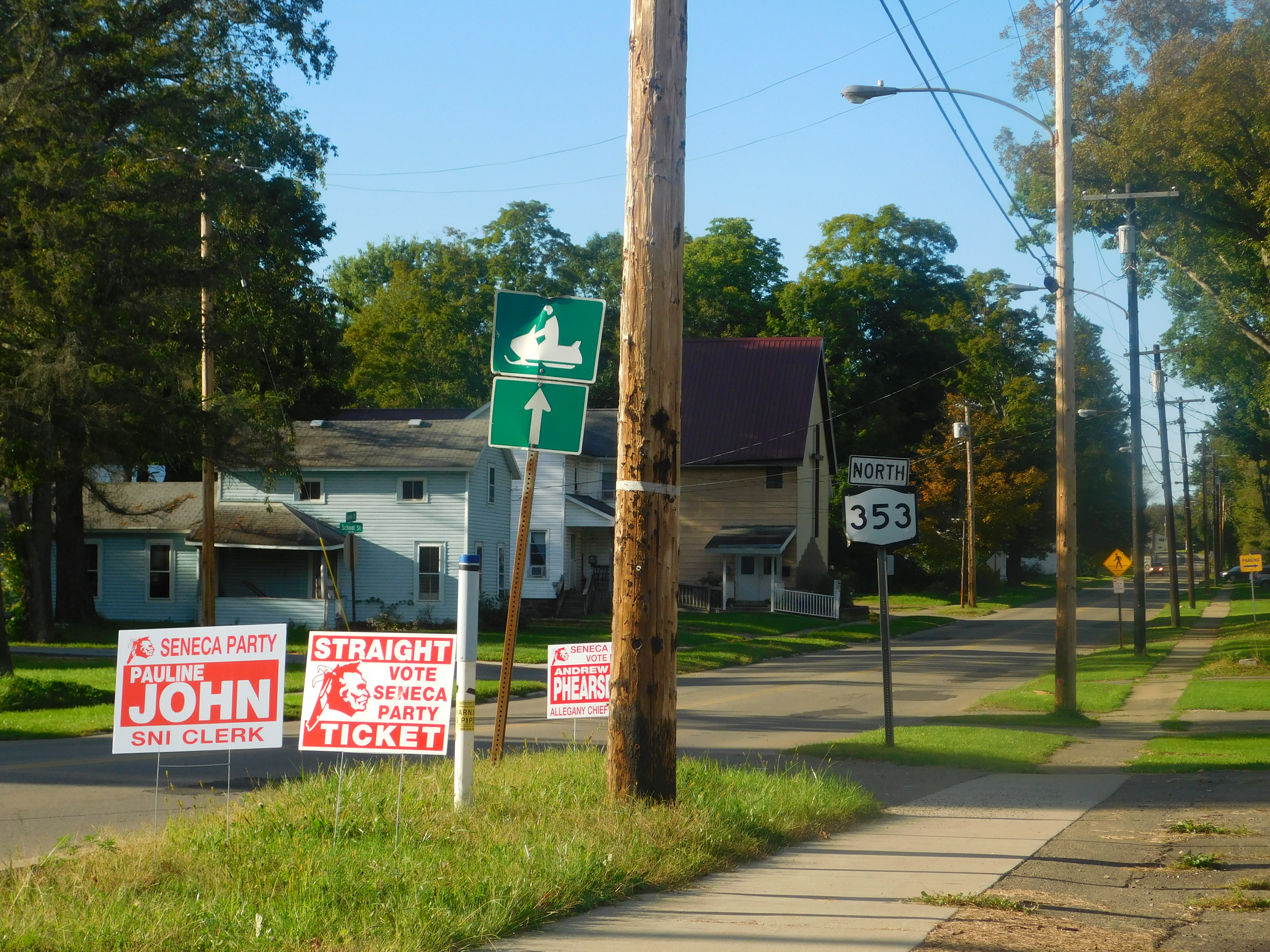
A collection of Seneca political election signage, with the middle sign advertising the straight-ticket option

The Seneca Nation of Indians, which operates under a republican form of government on reservations within the bounds of the state of New York, offers a straight-ticket voting option. To qualify, a political party must field candidates in each seat up for election in a given year. In practice, only the Seneca Party, which has been the dominant party in the nation's politics for decades, has ever received the straight-ticket option. Opponents of the Seneca Party have accused the party of using the straight-ticket option to eavesdrop on voters and punish them with the loss of their jobs if they do not use it, also using the promise of jobs to those running in opposing parties to get them to drop out and deny those parties the straight-ticket option.

== Italy ==
Since the reintroduction of a mixed electoral system in 2017, ticket splitting had been banned. If a voter decides to only vote for a candidate, their party vote will be split among the parties which fused to nominate a candidate based on the proportion to their votes obtained in the constituency.

== See also ==
- Coattail effect
- Double simultaneous vote
- Split-ticket voting
- Ticket (election)
