= 2016 Cook County, Illinois, elections =

- November 8, 2016
- Turnout: 71.54%

The Cook County, Illinois, general election was held on November 8, 2016.

Primaries were held March 15, 2016.

Elections were held for Clerk of the Circuit Court, Recorder of Deeds, State's Attorney, Cook County Board of Review districts 1 and 2, four seats on the Water Reclamation District Board, and judgeships on the Circuit Court of Cook County.

== Election information ==
2016 was a presidential election year in the United States. The primaries and general elections for Cook County races coincided with those for federal races (President, House, and Senate) and those for state elections.

=== Voter turnout ===
Voter turnout in Cook County during the primaries was 51.12%, with 1,512,348 ballots cast. Among these, 1,197,073 Democratic, 314,517 Republican, 404 Green, and 354 nonpartisan primary ballots were cast. The city of Chicago saw 53.52% turnout. Suburban Cook County saw 48.61% turnout, its highest turnout for presidential primaries since at least 1992. In Chicago, more than 118,000 votes cast were early votes, setting a record for the time for Chicago primaries (since surpassed by the 2020 elections). In suburban Cook County, 31,409 mail-in ballots were returned by voters, setting a record (also surpassed in 2020).

The general election saw 71.54% turnout, with 2,205,504 ballots cast. Chicago saw 71.04% turnout and suburban Cook County saw 72.07% turnout.

== Clerk of the Circuit Court ==
2016 Clerk of the Circuit Court of Cook County election
- November 8, 2016
- Turnout: 66.39%
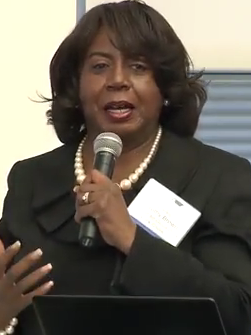

Candidate	Dorothy A. Brown	Diane Shapiro
Party	Democratic	Republican
Popular vote	1,345,696	656,232
Percentage	67.22%	32.78%
Clerk before election
Dorothy A. Brown
Democratic
Elected Clerk
Dorothy A. Brown
Democratic

In the 2016 Clerk of the Circuit Court of Cook County election, incumbent fourth-term Clerk Dorothy A. Brown, a Democrat, was reelected.

=== Primaries ===
==== Democratic ====
Clerk of the Circuit Court of Cook County Democratic primary
Party	Candidate	Votes	%
Democratic	Dorothy A. Brown (incumbent)	477,503	47.27
Democratic	Michelle A. Harris	307,392	30.43
Democratic	Jacob Meister	221,921	21.97
Write-in	Tio Hardiman	4	0.00
Write-in	Others	3,247	0.32
Total votes		1,010,067	100

==== Republican ====
Clerk of the Circuit Court of Cook County Republican primary
Party	Candidate	Votes	%
Republican	Diane S. Shapiro	208,340	100
Total votes		208,340	100

=== General election ===
Clerk of the Circuit Court of Cook County election
Party	Candidate	Votes	%	±%
Democratic	Dorothy A. Brown (incumbent)	1,345,696	67.22	−3.22
Republican	Diane S. Shapiro	656,232	32.78	+3.22
Total votes		2,001,928	100	

== Recorder of Deeds ==
2016 Cook County Recorder of Deeds election
- November 8, 2016
- Turnout: 55.41%
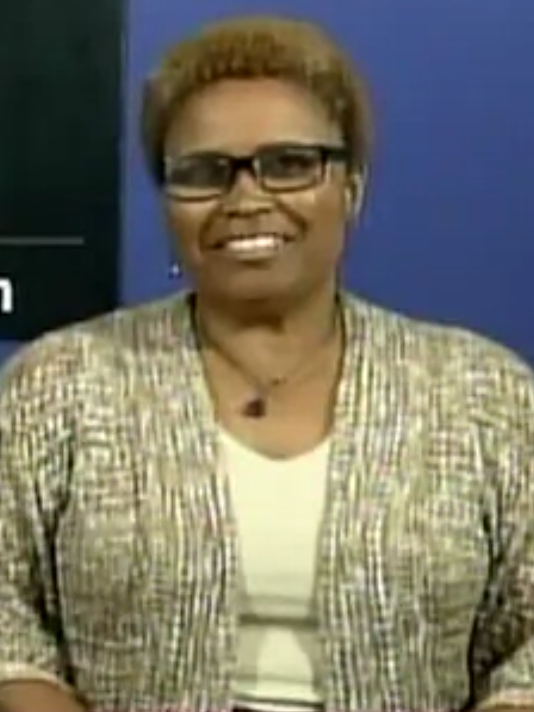
Candidate	Karen Yarbrough
Party	Democratic
Popular vote	1,647,174
Percentage	98.58%
Recorder of Deeds before election
Karen Yarbrough
Democratic
Elected Recorder of Deeds
Karen Yarbrough
Democratic

In the 2016 Cook County Recorder of Deeds election, incumbent first-term Recorder of Deeds Karen Yarbrough, a Democrat, was reelected, running unopposed in both the Democratic primary and general election.

This was ultimately the last election held for this office, as, on the same day as the general election, Cook County voters approved a ballot measure to merge the office with that of Cook County Clerk by December 7, 2020.

=== Primaries ===
==== Democratic ====
Cook County Recorder of Deeds Democratic primary
Party	Candidate	Votes	%
Democratic	Karen A. Yarbrough (incumbent)	888,242	99.19
Write-in	Others	7,250	0.81
Total votes		895,492	100

===== Republican =====
No candidates, ballot-certified or formal write-in, ran in the Republican primary.

=== General election ===
Cook County Recorder of Deeds election
Party	Candidate	Votes	%
Democratic	Karen A. Yarbrough (incumbent)	1,647,174	98.58
Write-in	Phil Collins	57	0.00
Write-in	Others	23,637	1.42
Total votes		1,670,868	100

== State's Attorney ==
2016 Cook County State's Attorney election
- November 8, 2016
- Turnout: 67.14%
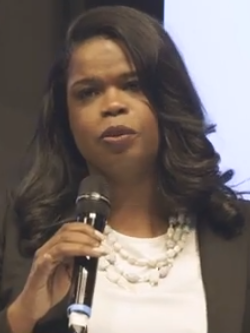

Candidate	Kim Foxx	Christopher Pfannkuche
Party	Democratic	Republican
Popular vote	1,459,087	565,671
Percentage	72.06%	27.94%
State's Attorney before election
Anita Alvarez
Democratic
Elected State's Attorney
Kim Foxx
Democratic

In the 2016 Cook County State's Attorney election, incumbent second-term State's Attorney Anita Alvarez, a Democrat, lost her bid for reelection, being unseated in the Democratic primary by Kim Foxx, who went on to win the general election.

Only Democrats had held this office ever since 1996, when Richard A. Devine unseated Republican Jack O'Malley.

=== Primaries ===
==== Democratic ====
Cook County State’s Attorney Democratic primary
Party	Candidate	Votes	%
Democratic	Kim Foxx	645,738	58.31
Democratic	Anita Alvarez (incumbent)	317,594	28.68
Democratic	Donna More	144,063	13.01
Total votes		1,107,395	100

==== Republican ====
Cook County State’s Attorney Republican primary
Party	Candidate	Votes	%
Republican	Christopher E.K. Pfannkuche	201,204	100
Total votes		201,204	100

=== General election ===
Cook County State’s Attorney election
Party	Candidate	Votes	%	±%
Democratic	Kim Foxx	1,459,087	72.06	−4.99
Republican	Christopher E.K. Pfannkuche	565,671	27.94	+5.17
Total votes		2,024,758	100	

== Cook County Board of Review ==
2016 Cook County Board of Review election
- November 8, 2016

2 of 3 seats on the Cook County Board of Review 2 seats needed for a majority
	First party	Second party
Party	Democratic	Republican
Seats before	2	1
Seats after	2	1
Seat change	Steady	Steady
Seats up	1	1
Races won	1	1

In the 2016 Cook County Board of Review election, two seats, one Democratic-held and one Republican-held, out of its three seats were up for election. Both incumbents won reelection.

The Cook County Board of Review has its three seats rotate the length of terms. In a staggered fashion (in which no two seats have coinciding two-year terms), the seats rotate between two consecutive four-year terms and a two-year term.

=== 1st district ===
Incumbent second-term member Dan Patlak, a Republican, was reelected. Patlak was last reelected in 2012. This election was to a four-year term.

==== Primaries ====
===== Democratic =====
No candidates, ballot-certified or formal write-in, ran in the Democratic primary. The Democrats ultimately nominated Marty Stack.

===== Republican =====
Cook County Board of Review 1st district Republican primary
Party	Candidate	Votes	%
Republican	Dan Patlak (incumbent)	132,977	100
Total votes		132,977	100

==== General election ====
Cook County Board of Review 1st district election
Party	Candidate	Votes	%
Republican	Dan Patlak (incumbent)	353,705	51.89
Democratic	Marty Stack	327,998	48.11
Total votes		681,703	100

=== 2nd district ===
Incumbent member Michael Cabonargi, a Democrat first appointed in 2011 and elected to a full term in 2012, was reelected, running unopposed in both the Democratic primary and general election. This election was to a two-year term.

==== Primaries ====
===== Democratic =====
Cook County Board of Review 2nd district Democratic primary
Party	Candidate	Votes	%
Democratic	Michael Cabonargi (incumbent)	275,406	100
Total votes		275,406	100

===== Republican =====
No candidates, ballot-certified or formal write-in, ran in the Republican primary.

==== General election ====
Cook County Board of Review 2nd district election
Party	Candidate	Votes	%
Democratic	Michael Cabonargi (incumbent)	508,321	100
Total votes		508,321	100

== Water Reclamation District Board ==
2016 Metropolitan Water Reclamation District of Greater Chicago election
- November 8, 2016

4 of 9 seats on the Metropolitan Water Reclamation District of Greater Chicago 5 seats needed for a majority
	First party	Second party	Third party
Party	Democratic	Green	Republican
Seats before	8	0	1
Seats after	9	0	0
Seat change	▲1	Steady	▼1
Popular vote	4,242,494	1,173,374	482,277
Percentage	71.93%	19.90%	8.18%
Swing	▲10.09%	▲8.52%	▼18.60%
Seats up	3	0	1
Races won	4	0	0

In the 2016 Metropolitan Water Reclamation District of Greater Chicago election, four of the nine seats on the Metropolitan Water Reclamation District of Greater Chicago board were up for election. Three were regularly scheduled elections, and one was a special election due to a vacancy.

Democrats won all four seats up for reelection. The two incumbents seeking reelection won, and two new members were also elected.

=== Regularly-scheduled election ===
Three six-year term seats were up for the regularly scheduled election. Since three six-year seats were up for election, voters could vote for up to three candidates, and the top-three finishers would win.

Two of the incumbents for the three seats were seeking reelection, Barbara McGowan and Mariyana Spyropoulos, both Democrats. Each won reelection. The third, newly elected, winner of the general election was fellow Democrat Josina Morita.

==== Primaries ====
===== Democratic =====
Water Reclamation District Board Democratic primary
Party	Candidate	Votes	%
Democratic	Barbara McGowan (incumbent)	517,239	24.42
Democratic	Mariyana T. Spyropoulos (incumbent)	423,313	19.99
Democratic	Josina Morita	388,766	18.36
Democratic	Kevin McDevit	303,170	14.32
Democratic	Joseph Daniel Cook	321,814	15.20
Democratic	R. Cary Capparelli	163,482	7.72
Total votes		2,117,784	100

===== Republican =====
No candidates, ballot-certified or formal write-in, ran in the Republican primary.

==== General election ====
Water Reclamation District Board election
Party	Candidate	Votes	%
Democratic	Barara McGowan (incumbent)	1,150,063	28.79
Democratic	Mariyana T. Spyropoulos (incumbent)	951,773	23.83
Democratic	Josina Morita	919,714	23.03
Green	Karen Roothaan	343,930	8.61
Green	George Milkowski	308,576	7.73
Green	Michael Smith	320,162	8.02
Total votes		3,994,218	100

=== Unexpired term (2 years) ===
A special election was held to fill the seat vacated when Patrick Daley Thompson resigned to assume office as a Chicago alderman. This seat had been filled with an interim appointment by Governor Bruce Rauner of David J. Walsh. Walsh was a Republican.

==== Primaries ====
===== Democratic =====
Water Reclamation District Board unexpired term Democratic primary
Party	Candidate	Votes	%
Democratic	Martin J. Durkan	334,416	38.27
Democratic	Tom Greenhaw	296,262	33.90
Democratic	Andrew Seo	236,950	27.11
Write-in	Others	6,276	0.72
Total votes		873,904	100

===== Republican =====
Water Reclamation District Board unexpired term Republican primary
Party	Candidate	Votes	%
Republican	Herb Schumann	194,158	100
Total votes		194,158	100

==== General election ====
Water Reclamation District Board unexpired term election
Party	Candidate	Votes	%
Democratic	Martin J. Durkan	1,220,944	64.13
Republican	Herb Schumann	482,277	25.33
Green	Christopher Anthony	200,706	10.54
Total votes		1,903,927	100

== Judicial elections ==
13 judgeships on the Circuit Court of Cook County were up for partisan elections due to vacancies. 57 judgeships on the Circuit Court of Cook County were up for retention elections.

22 subcircuit courts judgeships were up for partisan elections due to vacancies. Other judgeships had retention elections.

== Ballot questions ==
Two ballot questions were included on ballots county-wide during the November general election.

=== Clerk-Recorder Office ===
A ballot question was referred by the Cook County Board of Commissioners to the voters of Cook County as to whether the position of Cook County Recorder of Deeds should be eliminated, and its duties merged into the position Cook County Clerk. Voters ultimately approved the ballot question.

The sponsor of the legislation passed by the Cook County Board of Commissioners which created the ballot question was John Fritchey. The legislation to create this ballot question passed unanimously in a vote of all seventeen members of the Board of Commissioners.

The last time the county had voted by referendum on whether to eliminate an elected office was in 1972, when voters strongly voted in favor of eliminating the elected position of Cook County Coroner, replacing it with an appointed medical examiner.

The ballot measure asked the question,

Shall the Office of the Cook County Recorder of Deeds be eliminated and all duties and responsibilities of the Office of the Cook County Recorder of Deeds be transferred to, and assumed by, the Office of the Cook County Clerk by December 7, 2020?

Clerk-Recorder Office ballot question
Candidate	Votes	%
Yes	1,195,413	63.15
No	697,427	36.85
Total votes	1,892,840	100
Turnout	{{{votes}}}	62.77%

=== Earned Sick Time ===
A ballot question was created by a successful citizen initiative petition which asked Cook County voters whether they believed that Illinois should enact the Earned Sick Time for Employees Act, thus allowing Illinois workers to earn up to 40 hours of paid sick leave.

The ballot measure asked the question,

Shall Illinois enact the Earned Sick Time for Employees Act which will allow Illinois workers to earn up to 40 hours of sick time a year to take care of their own health or a family member's health?

Earned Sick Time ballot question
Candidate	Votes	%
Yes	1,718,405	85.53
No	290,815	14.47
Total votes	2,009,220	100
Turnout	{{{votes}}}	66.63%

== Other elections ==
Coinciding with the primaries, elections were held to elect both the Democratic and Republican committeepeople for the wards of Chicago.

== See also ==
- 2016 Illinois elections
