= 2008 Cook County, Illinois, elections =

- November 4, 2008
- Turnout: 73.71%

The Cook County, Illinois, general election was held on November 4, 2008.

Primaries were held February 5, 2008.

Elections were held for Clerk of the Circuit Court, Recorder of Deeds, State's Attorney, Board of Review districts 2 and 3, three seats on the Water Reclamation District Board, and judgeships on the Circuit Court of Cook County.

== Election information ==
2012 was a presidential election year in the United States. The primaries and general elections for Cook County races coincided with those for federal races (President and House) and those for state elections.

=== Voter turnout ===
Voter turnout in Cook County during the primaries was 47.95%, with 1,274,569 ballots cast. Among these, 1,091,008 Democratic, 200,750 Republican, 112 Green, 4 Moderate, and 2,125 nonpartisan primary ballots were cast. The city of Chicago saw 52.70% turnout and suburban Cook County saw 43.3% turnout.

The general election saw 73.71% turnout, with 2,162,240 ballots cast. Chicago saw 73.87% turnout and suburban Cook County saw 73.54% turnout.

== Clerk of the Circuit Court ==
2008 Clerk of the Circuit Court of Cook County election
- November 4, 2008
- Turnout: 65.68%
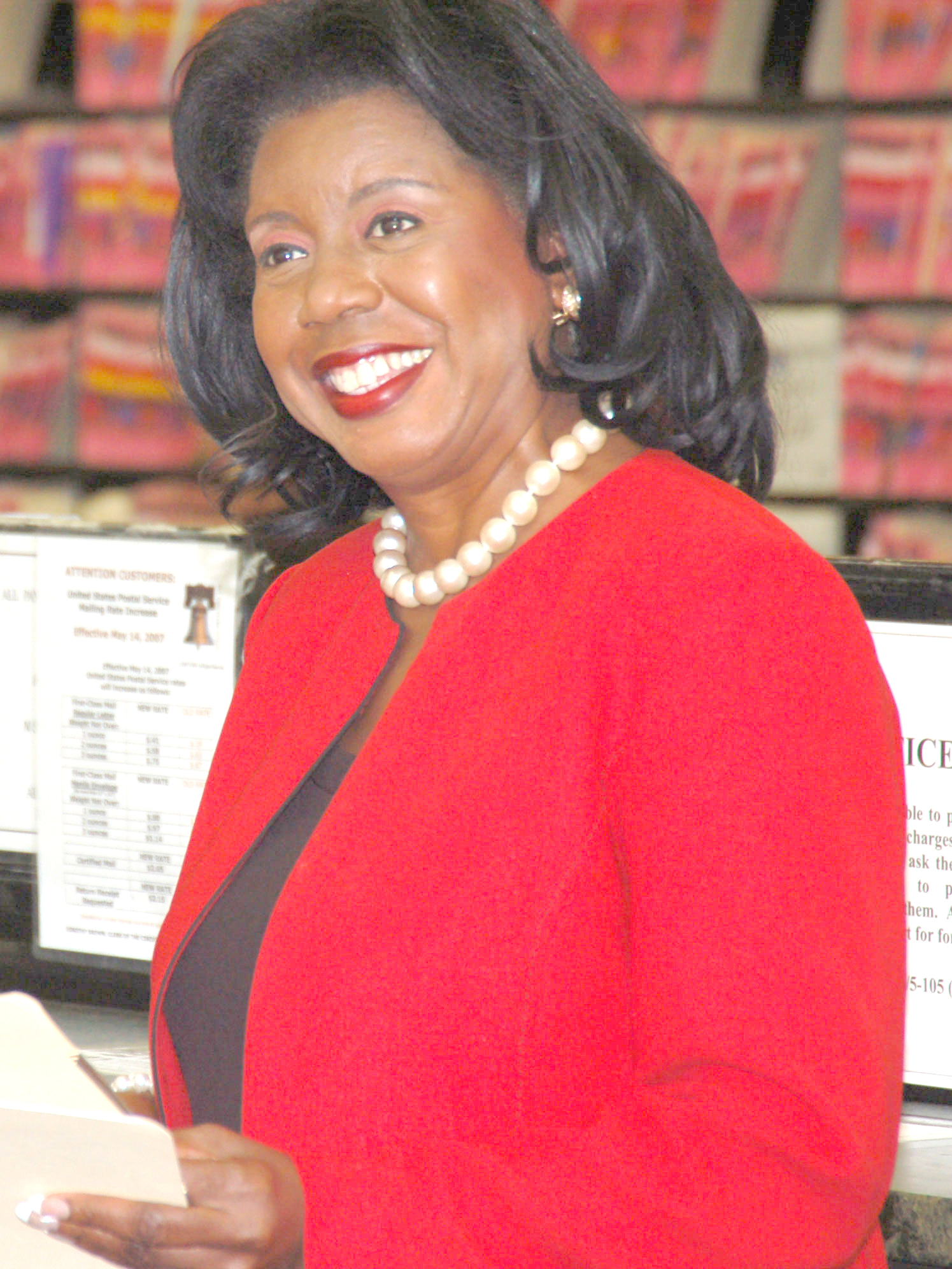

Candidate	Dorothy A. Brown	Diane Shapiro
Party	Democratic	Republican
Popular vote	1,315,731	517,115
Percentage	68.29%	26.84%
Clerk before election
Dorothy A. Brown
Democratic
Elected Clerk
Dorothy A. Brown
Democratic

In the 2008 Clerk of the Circuit Court of Cook County election, incumbent second-term Clerk Dorothy A. Brown, a Democrat, was reelected.

=== Primaries ===
==== Democratic ====
Clerk of the Circuit Court of Cook County Democratic primary
Party	Candidate	Votes	%
Democratic	Dorothy A. Brown (incumbent)	833,795	100
Total votes		833,795	100

==== Republican ====
No candidates, ballot-certified or formal write-in, ran in the Republican primary. The Republican Party ultimately nominated Diane Shapiro.

==== Green ====
No candidates, ballot-certified or formal write-in, ran in the Green primary. The Green Party ultimately nominated Paloma Andrade.

=== General election ===
Clerk of the Circuit Court of Cook County election
Party	Candidate	Votes	%	±%
Democratic	Dorothy A. Brown (incumbent)	1,315,731	68.29	−5.77
Republican	Diane Shapiro	517,115	26.84	+0.90
Green	Paloma Andrade	93,906	4.87	N/A
Total votes		1,926,752	100	

== Recorder of Deeds ==
2008 Cook County Recorder of Deeds election
- November 4, 2008
- Turnout: 64.05%
Candidate	Eugene Moore	Gregory Goldstein	Terrence A. Gilhooly
Party	Democratic	Republican	Green
Popular vote	1,324,426	451,452	102,968
Percentage	70.49%	24.03%	5.48%
Recorder of Deeds before election
Eugene Moore
Democratic
Elected Recorder of Deeds
Eugene Moore
Democratic

In the 2008 Cook County Recorder of Deeds election, incumbent Recorder of Deeds Eugene Moore, a Democrat, was reelected. Moore had first been appointed in 1999 (after Jesse White resigned to become Illinois Secretary of State), and had been elected to two full-terms.

=== Primaries ===
==== Democratic ====
Incumbent Record Eugene Moore defeated a challenge from Ed Smith (Chicago City Council alderman from the 28th ward).

Smith's candidacy had received endorsements from prominent figures, including Chicago Mayor Richard M. Daley (who rarely gave endorsements in contested county primaries), Illinois Senate President Emil Jones, and business executive John W. Rogers Jr.

Cook County Recorder of Deeds Democratic primary
Party	Candidate	Votes	%
Democratic	Eugene "Gene" Moore (incumbent)	521,163	61.12
Democratic	Ed H. Smith	331,511	38.88
Total votes		852,674	100

===== Republican =====
No candidates, ballot-certified or formal write-in, ran in the Republican primary. The Republican Party ultimately nominated Gregory Goldstein.

===== Green =====
No candidates, ballot-certified or formal write-in, ran in the Green primary. The Green Party ultimately nominated Terrence A. Gilhooly

=== General election ===
Cook County Recorder of Deeds election
Party	Candidate	Votes	%
Democratic	Eugene "Gene" Moore (incumbent)	1,324,426	70.49
Republican	Gregory Goldstein	451,452	24.03
Green	Terrence A. Gilhooly	102,968	5.48
Total votes		1,878,846	100

== State's Attorney ==
2008 Cook County State's Attorney election
- November 4, 2008
- Turnout: 67.23%
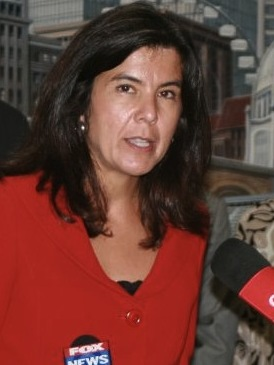

Candidate	Anita Alvarez	Tony Peraica	Thomas O'Brien
Party	Democratic	Republican	Green
Popular vote	1,378,452	494,611	99,101
Percentage	69.90%	25.08%	5.03%
State's Attorney before election
Richard A. Devine
Democratic
Elected State's Attorney
Anita Alvarez
Democratic

In the 2008 Cook County State's Attorney election, incumbent third-term State's Attorney Richard A. Devine, a Democrat, did not seek reelection. Democrat Anita Alvarez was elected to succeed him.

Alvarez became the first Hispanic woman elected to this position, after also having been the first Latina to win the Democratic nomination for the office.

=== Primaries ===
==== Democratic ====
Cook County State’s Attorney Democratic primary
Party	Candidate	Votes	%
Democratic	Anita Alvarez	244,538	25.73
Democratic	Tom Allen	234,976	24.72
Democratic	Larry Suffredin	210,381	22.14
Democratic	Howard B. Brookins, Jr.	172,746	18.18
Democratic	Robert J. Milan	55,350	5.82
Democratic	Tommy H. Brewer	32,430	3.41
Total votes		950,421	100

==== Republican ====
Cook County State’s Attorney Republican primary
Party	Candidate	Votes	%
Republican	Tony Peraica	137,767	100
Total votes		137,767	100

==== Green ====
No candidates, ballot-certified or formal write-in, ran in the Green primary. The Green Party ultimately nominated Thomas O'Brien.

=== General election ===
Cook County State’s Attorney election
Party	Candidate	Votes	%	±%
Democratic	Anita Alvarez	1,378,452	69.90	−9.63
Republican	Tony Peraica	494,611	25.08	+4.51
Green	Thomas O'Brien	99,101	5.03	N/A
Total votes		1,972,164	100	

== Cook County Board of Review ==
2008 Cook County Board of Review election
- November 4, 2008

2 of 3 seats on the Cook County Board of Review 2 seats needed for a majority
	First party	Second party
Party	Democratic	Republican
Seats before	3	0
Seats after	3	0
Seat change	Steady	Steady
Seats up	2	0
Races won	2	0

In the 2008 Cook County Board of Review election, two seats, both Democratic-held, were up for election. Both incumbents won reelection.

The Cook County Board of Review has its three seats rotate the length of terms. In a staggered fashion (in which no two seats have coinciding two-year terms), the seats rotate between two consecutive four-year terms and a two-year term.

=== 2nd district ===
Incumbent third-term member Joseph Berrios, a Democrat last reelected in 2006, was reelected. Berrios had served since the Board of Review was constituted in 1998, and had served on its predecessor organization, the Cook County Board of Appeals, for another ten years. This election was to a four-year term.

==== Primaries ====
===== Democratic =====
Cook County Board of Review 2nd district Democratic primary
Party	Candidate	Votes	%
Democratic	Joseph Berrios (incumbent)	153,053	58.65
Democratic	Jay Paul Deratany	107,889	41.35
Total votes		260,942	100

===== Republican =====
No candidates, ballot-certified or formal write-in, ran in the Republican primary. The Republican Party ultimately nominated Lauren Elizabeth McCracken-Quirk.

===== Green =====
No candidates, ballot-certified or formal write-in, ran in the Green primary. The Green Party ultimately nominated Howard Kaplan.

==== General election ====
Cook County Board of Review 2nd district election
Party	Candidate	Votes	%
Democratic	Joseph Berrios (incumbent)	370,380	69.94
Republican	Lauren Elizabeth McCracken-Quirk	108,138	20.42
Green	Howard Kaplan	51,088	9.65
Total votes		529,606	100

=== 3rd district ===
Incumbent first-term member Larry Rogers, Jr., a Democrat elected in 2004, was reelected. This election was to a four-year term.

==== Primaries ====
===== Democratic =====
Cook County Board of Review 3rd district Democratic primary
Party	Candidate	Votes	%
Democratic	Larry R. Rogers, Jr. (incumbent)	323,842	100
Total votes		323,842	100

===== Republican =====
No candidates, ballot-certified or formal write-in, ran in the Republican primary. The Republican Party ultimately nominated Lionel Garcia.

===== Green =====
No candidates, ballot-certified or formal write-in, ran in the Green primary. The Green Party ultimately nominated Antonne "Tony" Cox.

==== General election ====
Cook County Board of Review 3rd district election
Party	Candidate	Votes	%
Democratic	Larry R. Rogers, Jr. (incumbent)	573,194	88.69
Republican	Lionel Garcia	49,680	7.69
Green	Antonne "Tony" Cox	23,455	3.63
Total votes		646,329	100

== Water Reclamation District Board ==
2008 Metropolitan Water Reclamation District of Greater Chicago election
- November 4, 2008

3 of 9 seats on the Metropolitan Water Reclamation District of Greater Chicago 5 seats needed for a majority
	First party	Second party	Third party
Party	Democratic	Republican	Green
Seats before	9	0	0
Seats after	9	0	0
Seat change	Steady	Steady	Steady
Popular vote	2,925,190	976,574	380,319
Percentage	68.31%	22.81%	8.88%
Seats up	3	0	0
Races won	3	0	0

In the 2008 Metropolitan Water Reclamation District of Greater Chicago election, three of the nine seats on the Metropolitan Water Reclamation District of Greater Chicago board were up for election in an at-large election.

Three incumbent Democrats were reelected to their seats.

=== Democratic primary ===
All three incumbents were renominated.

Metropolitan Water Reclamation District Democratic primary
Party	Candidate	Votes	%
Democratic	Frank Avila (incumbent)	367,867	17.01
Democratic	Kathleen Therese Meany (incumbent)	336,047	15.54
Democratic	Cynthia M. Santos (incumbent)	334,427	15.47
Democratic	Mariyana T. Spyropoulos	307,067	14.20
Democratic	Daine Jones	284,623	13.16
Democratic	Dean T. Maragos	212,967	9.85
Democratic	Derrick David Stinson	188,506	8.72
Democratic	Matthew Podgorski	130,748	6.05

=== Republican primary ===
No candidates ran in the Republican primary.

=== Green primary ===
Metropolitan Water Reclamation District Green primary
Party	Candidate	Votes	%
Green	Nadine Bopp	572	34.48
Green	John "Jack" Alley	567	34.18
Green	Rita Bogolub	520	31.34

==== General election ====
Metropolitan Water Reclamation District election
Party	Candidate	Votes	%
Democratic	Frank Avila (incumbent)	1,091,542	25.49
Democratic	Cynthia M. Santos (incumbent)	937,529	21.89
Democratic	Kathleen Therese Meany (incumbent)	896,119	20.93
Republican	David Clearwater	343,516	8.02
Republican	Paul Chialdikas	317,081	7.40
Republican	Daniel Flores	315,977	7.38
Green	Nadine Bopp	166,289	3.88
Green	John "Jack" Alley	109,424	2.56
Green	Rita Bogolub	104,606	2.44
Total votes		4,282,083	100

== Judicial elections ==
Partisan elections were held for judgeships on the Circuit Court of Cook County due to vacancies. Other judgeships had retention elections.

Partistan elections were also held for subcircuit courts judgeships due to vacancies. Other judgeships had retention elections.

== Other elections ==
Coinciding with the primaries, elections were held to elect both the Democratic and Republican committeemen for the wards of Chicago.

== See also ==
- 2008 Illinois elections
