= 2012 Cook County, Illinois, elections =

- November 6, 2012
- Turnout: 70.59%

The Cook County, Illinois, general election was held on November 6, 2012.

Primaries were held March 20, 2012.

Elections were held for Clerk of the Circuit Court, Recorder of Deeds, State's Attorney, all three seats on the Board of Review, three seats on the Water Reclamation District Board, and judgeships on the Circuit Court of Cook County.

== Election information ==
2012 was a presidential election year in the United States. The primaries and general elections for Cook County races coincided with those for federal races (President and House) and those for state elections.

=== Voter turnout ===
Voter turnout in Cook County during the primaries was 24.03%, with 644,701 ballots cast. Among these, 440,873 Democratic, 200,750 Republican, 112 Green, and 2,966 nonpartisan primary ballots were cast. The city of Chicago saw 24.46% turnout, its lowest turnout for a presidential primary on record (with the records dating back to 1942). Suburban Cook County saw 23.63% turnout.

The general election saw 70.59% turnout, with 2,030,563 ballots cast. Chicago saw 73.01% turnout and suburban Cook County saw 70.70% turnout.

== Clerk of the Circuit Court ==
2012 Clerk of the Circuit Court of Cook County election
- November 6, 2012
- Turnout: 63.74%
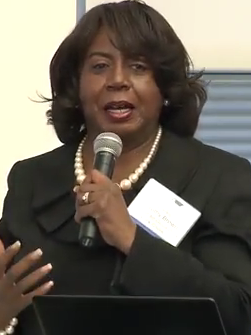

Candidate	Dorothy A. Brown	Diane Shapiro
Party	Democratic	Republican
Popular vote	1,291,499	541,973
Percentage	70.44%	29.56%
Clerk before election
Dorothy A. Brown
Democratic
Elected Clerk
Dorothy A. Brown
Democratic

In the 2012 Clerk of the Circuit Court of Cook County election, incumbent third-term Clerk Dorothy A. Brown, a Democrat, was reelected.

=== Primaries ===
==== Democratic ====
Clerk of the Circuit Court of Cook County Democratic primary
Party	Candidate	Votes	%
Democratic	Dorothy A. Brown (incumbent)	269,781	67.44
Democratic	Ricardo Muñoz	130,221	32.56
Total votes		400,002	100

==== Republican ====
No candidates, ballot-certified or formal write-in, ran in the Republican primary. The Republican Party ultimately nominated Diane S. Shapiro.

=== General election ===
Clerk of the Circuit Court of Cook County election
Party	Candidate	Votes	%	±%
Democratic	Dorothy A. Brown (incumbent)	1,291,499	70.44	+2.15
Republican	Diane S. Shapiro	541,973	29.56	+2.72
Total votes		1,833,472	100	

== Recorder of Deeds ==
2012 Cook County Recorder of Deeds election
- November 6, 2012
- Turnout: 61.88%
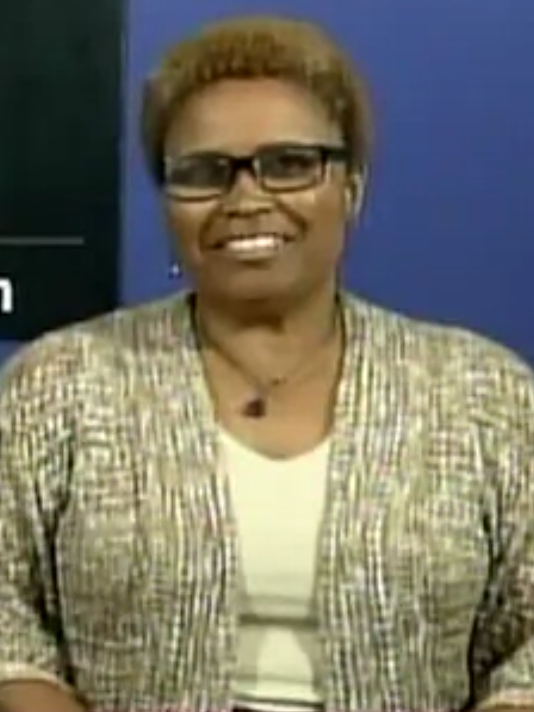

Candidate	Karen Yarbrough	Sherri Griffith
Party	Democratic	Republican
Popular vote	1,313,967	466,038
Percentage	73.82%	26.18%
Recorder of Deeds before election
Eugene Moore
Democratic
Elected Recorder of Deeds
Karen Yarbrough
Democratic

In the 2012 Cook County Recorder of Deeds election, incumbent Recorder of Deeds Eugene Moore, a Democrat, did not seek reelection. Moore had served as Recorder of Deeds since 1999. Karen Yarbrough was elected to succeed him.

=== Primaries ===
==== Democratic ====
Cook County Recorder of Deeds Democratic primary
Party	Candidate	Votes	%
Democratic	Karen A. Yarbrough	343,603	100
Total votes		343,603	100

===== Republican =====
No candidates, ballot-certified or formal write-in, ran in the Republican primary. The Republican Party ultimately nominated Sherri Griffith.

=== General election ===
Cook County Recorder of Deeds election
Party	Candidate	Votes	%
Democratic	Karen A. Yarbrough	1,313,967	73.82
Republican	Sherri Griffith	466,038	26.18
Total votes		1,780,005	100

== State's Attorney ==
2012 Cook County State's Attorney election
- November 6, 2012
- Turnout: 64.39%
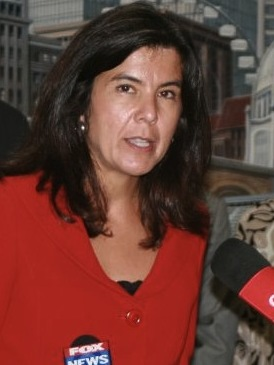

Candidate	Anita Alvarez	Lori S. Yokoyama
Party	Democratic	Republican
Popular vote	1,427,145	421,810
Percentage	77.05%	22.77%
State's Attorney before election
Anita Alvarez
Democratic
Elected State's Attorney
Anita Alvarez
Democratic

In the 2012 Cook County State's Attorney election, incumbent first-term State's Attorney Anita Alvarez, a Democrat, was reelected.

Only Democrats had held this office ever since Richard A. Devine unseated Republican Jack O'Malley in 1996.

=== Primaries ===
==== Democratic ====
Cook County State’s Attorney Democratic primary
Party	Candidate	Votes	%
Democratic	Anita Alvarez (incumbent)	343,555	100
Total votes		343,555	100

==== Republican ====
No candidates, ballot-certified or formal write-in, ran in the Republican primary. The Republican Party ultimately nominated Lori S. Yokoyama.

=== General election ===
Cook County State’s Attorney election
Party	Candidate	Votes	%	±%
Democratic	Anita Alvarez (incumbent)	1,427,145	77.05	+7.15
Republican	Lori S. Yokoyama	421,810	22.77	−2.31
Write-in	Others	3,320	0.18	N/A
Total votes		1,852,275	100	

== Cook County Board of Review ==
2012 Cook County Board of Review election
- November 6, 2012

2 of 3 seats on the Cook County Board of Review 2 seats needed for a majority
	First party	Second party
Party	Democratic	Republican
Seats before	2	1
Seats after	2	1
Seat change	Steady	Steady
Seats up	2	1
Races won	2	1

In the 2012 Cook County Board of Review election, all three seats, two Democratic-held and one Republican-held, were up for election. All incumbents won reelection.

The Cook County Board of Review has its three seats rotate the length of terms. In a staggered fashion (in which no two seats have coinciding two-year terms), the seats rotate between two consecutive four-year terms and a two-year term. This was the first year since 2002 that all three seats were coincidingly up for election.

As these were the first elections held following the 2010 United States census, the seats faced redistricting before this election.

=== 1st district ===
Incumbent first-term member Dan Patlak, a Republican first elected in 2010, was reelected. This election was to a four-year term.

==== Primaries ====
===== Democratic =====
Cook County Board of Review 1st district Democratic primary
Party	Candidate	Votes	%
Democratic	Casey Thomas Griffin	71,168	100
Total votes		71,168	100

===== Republican =====
Cook County Board of Review 1st district Republican primary
Party	Candidate	Votes	%
Republican	Dan Patlak (incumbent)	59,778	53.68
Republican	Sean M. Morrison	51,577	46.32
Total votes		111,355	100

==== General election ====
Cook County Board of Review 1st district election
Party	Candidate	Votes	%
Republican	Dan Patlak (incumbent)	316,190	51.52
Democratic	Casey Thomas Griffin	297,517	48.48
Total votes		613,707	100

=== 2nd district ===
Incumbent member Michael Cabonargi, a Democrat appointed in 2011 after Joseph Berrios resigned to assume office as Cook County Assessor, was reelected to a full term, running unopposed in both the Democratic primary and general election. This election was to a four-year term.

==== Primaries ====
===== Democratic =====
Cook County Board of Review 2nd district Democratic primary
Party	Candidate	Votes	%
Democratic	Michael Cabonargi (incumbent)	88,990	100
Total votes		88,990	100

===== Republican =====
No candidates, ballot-certified or formal write-in, ran in the Republican primary.

==== General election ====
Cook County Board of Review 2nd district election
Party	Candidate	Votes	%
Democratic	Michael Cabonargi (incumbent)	404,100	100
Total votes		404,100	100

=== 3rd district ===
Incumbent second-term member Larry Rogers, Jr., a Democrat, was reelected, running unopposed in both the Democratic primary and general election. Rogers had last been reelected in 2008. This election was to a two-year term.

==== Primaries ====
===== Democratic =====
Cook County Board of Review 3rd district Democratic primary
Party	Candidate	Votes	%
Democratic	Larry Rogers, Jr. (incumbent)	170,821	100
Total votes		170,821	100

===== Republican =====
No candidates, ballot-certified or formal write-in, ran in the Republican primary.

==== General election ====
Cook County Board of Review 3rd district election
Party	Candidate	Votes	%
Democratic	Larry Rogers, Jr. (incumbent)	584,624	100
Total votes		584,624	100

== Water Reclamation District Board ==
2012 Metropolitan Water Reclamation District of Greater Chicago election
- November 6, 2012

3 of 9 seats on the Metropolitan Water Reclamation District of Greater Chicago 5 seats needed for a majority
	First party	Second party	Third party
Party	Democratic	Republican	Green
Seats before	9	0	0
Seats after	9	0	0
Seat change	Steady	Steady	Steady
Popular vote	2,884,689	675,810	507,547
Percentage	70.91%	16.61%	12.48%
Swing	▲2.63%	▼4.08%	▲1.46%
Seats up	3	0	0
Races won	3	0	0

In the 2012 Metropolitan Water Reclamation District of Greater Chicago election, three of the nine seats on the Metropolitan Water Reclamation District of Greater Chicago board were up for election in an at-large election.

Incumbent Democrats Debra Shore and Patricia Horton sought reelection. Horton failed to garner renomination, thus losing reelection.

Shore won reelection. Joining Shore in winning the general election were Democrats Kari K. Steele and Patrick Daley Thompson.

=== Primaries ===
==== Democratic ====
Water Reclamation District Board election Democratic primary
Party	Candidate	Votes	%
Democratic	Debra Shore (incumbent)	194,936	21.05
Democratic	Kari K. Steele	182,369	19.70
Democratic	Patrick Daley Thompson	162,329	17.53
Democratic	Patricia Young	129,670	14.01
Democratic	Patricia Horton (incumbent)	128,432	13.87
Democratic	Stella B. Black	125,147	13.52
Write-in	Others	2,968	0.32
Total votes		925,851	100

==== Republican ====
Water Reclamation District Board election Republican primary
Party	Candidate	Votes	%
Republican	Harold "Noonie" Ward	124,643	100
Total votes		124,643	100

=== General election ===
Water Reclamation District Board election
Party	Candidate	Votes	%
Democratic	Debra Shore (incumbent)	1,071,670	26.34
Democratic	Kari K. Steele	919,841	22.61
Democratic	Patrick Daley Thompson	893,178	21.96
Republican	Harold "Noonie" Ward	334,207	8.22
Republican	Carl Segvich	341,603	8.40
Green	Dave Ehrlich	200,953	4.94
Green	Karen Roothaan	189,505	4.66
Green	Nasrin R. Khalili	117,089	2.88
Total votes		4,068,046	100

== Judicial elections ==
12 judgeships on the Circuit Court of Cook County were up for partisan elections due to vacancies. 56 Circuit Court judgeships were up for retention elections.

23 subcircuit court judgeships were also up for partisan elections due to vacancies. Multiple subcircuit court judgeships were also up for retention elections.

== Other elections ==
Coinciding with the primaries, elections were held to elect both the Democratic and Republican committeemen for the wards of Chicago.

== See also ==
- 2012 Illinois elections
