= 2000 Cook County, Illinois, elections =

- November 7, 2000
- Turnout: 71.50%

The Cook County, Illinois, general election was held on November 7, 2000.

Primaries were held March 21, 2000.

Elections were held for Clerk of the Circuit Court, Recorder of Deeds, State's Attorney, four seats on the Water Reclamation District Board, and judgeships on the Circuit Court of Cook County.

== Election information ==
2000 was a presidential election year in the United States. The primaries and general elections for Cook County races coincided with those for federal races (President and House) and those for state elections.

=== Voter turnout ===
==== Primary election ====
Voter turnout in Cook County during the primaries was 28.26%. The city of Chicago saw 32.82% turnout and suburban Cook County saw 23.13% turnout.

Vote totals of primaries
Primary	Chicago vote totals	Suburban Cook County vote totals	Total Cook County vote totals
Democratic	424,642	148,370	573,012
Republican	27,701	124,830	152,531
Nonpartisan	2,086	8,841	10,927
Total	454,429	282,041	736,470

==== General election ====
The general election saw 71.50% turnout, with 1,988,821 ballots cast. Chicago saw 70.22% turnout and suburban Cook County saw 72.94% turnout.

== Clerk of the Circuit Court ==
2000 Clerk of the Circuit Court of Cook County election
- November 7, 2000
- Turnout: 59.04%
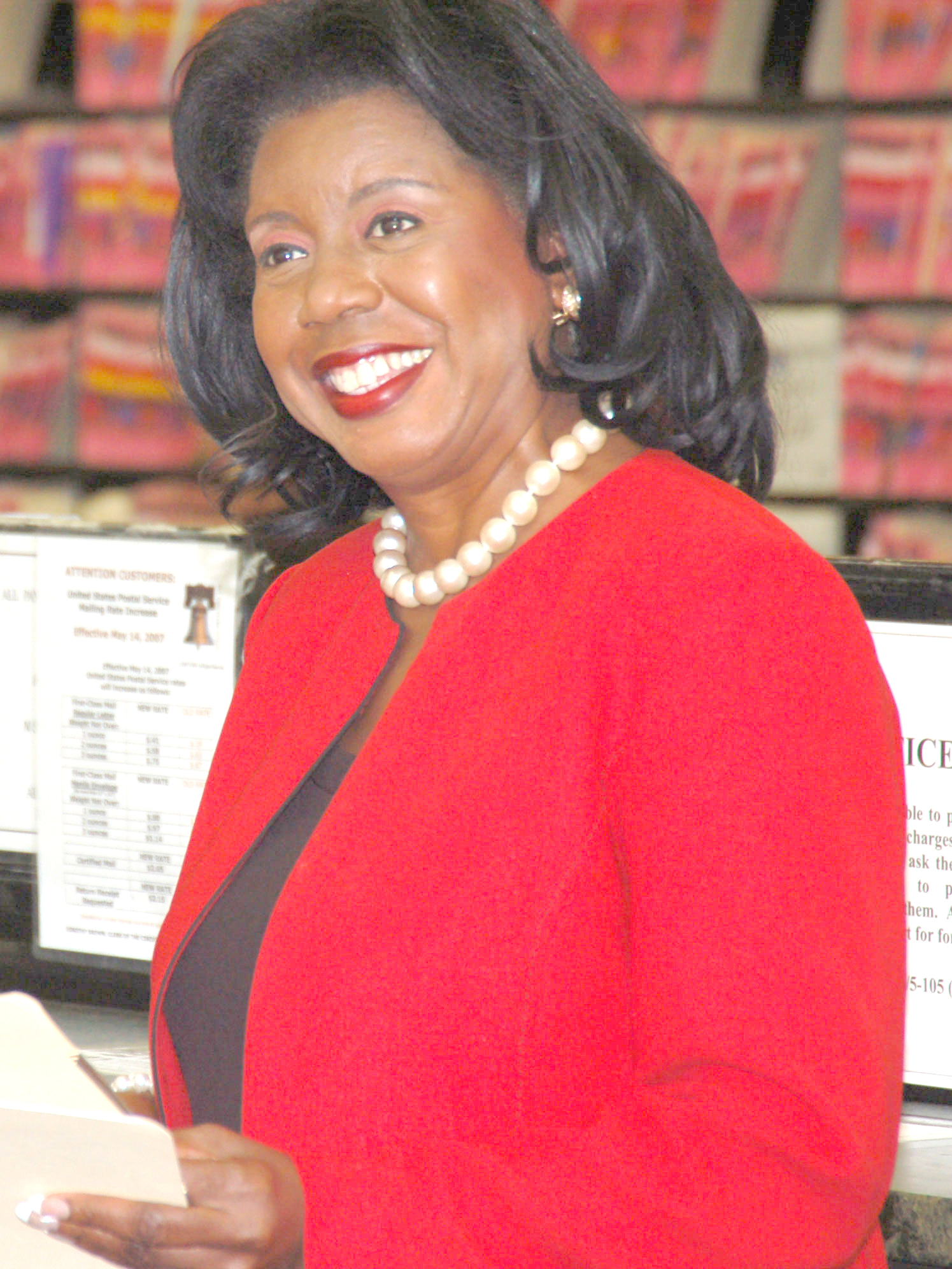

Candidate	Dorothy A. Brown	Nancy F. Mynard
Party	Democratic	Republican
Popular vote	1,197,773	444,336
Percentage	72.94%	27.06%
Clerk before election
Aurelia Pucinski
Republican
Elected Clerk
Dorothy A. Brown
Democratic

In the 2000 Clerk of the Circuit Court of Cook County election, incumbent third-term clerk Aurelia Pucinski, a Republican who had been elected as a Democrat (switching parties in 1998), did not seek reelection. Democrat Dorothy A. Brown was elected to succeed her.

Brown's election made her the first African-American to serve as clerk of the circuit court of Cook County.

=== Primaries ===
==== Democratic ====
Candidates

The following candidates ran for the Democratic Party nomination for Clerk of the Circuit Court:

Candidate	Experience	Ref
Dorothy A. Brown	General Auditor for the CTA since 1991; Candidate for Chicago City Treasurer in 1999	
Patrick Levar	Chicago Alderman for the 45th Ward since 1987	
Joe Moore	Chicago Alderman for the 49th Ward since 1991	
Patricia Young	Commissioner of the Metropolitan Water Reclamation District of Greater Chicago since 1992	

Results

Clerk of the Circuit Court of Cook County Democratic primary
Party	Candidate	Votes	%
Democratic	Dorothy A. Brown	222,906	48.54
Democratic	Patrick J. Levar	126,642	27.58
Democratic	Patricia Young	57,999	12.63
Democratic	Joe Moore	51,673	11.26
Total votes		459,254	100

==== Republican ====
Candidate

The following candidate ran for the Republican Party nomination for Clerk of the Circuit Court:

- Nancy Mynard, information technology company executive

Results

Clerk of the Circuit Court of Cook County Republican primary
Party	Candidate	Votes	%
Republican	Nancy F. Mynard	97,149	100
Total votes		97,149	100

=== General election ===
Clerk of the Circuit Court of Cook County election
Party	Candidate	Votes	%
Democratic	Dorothy A. Brown	1,197,773	72.94
Republican	Nancy F. Mynard	444,336	27.06
Total votes		1,642,109	100

== Recorder of Deeds ==
2000 Cook County Recorder of Deeds election
- November 7, 2000
- Turnout: 57.50%
Candidate	Eugene Moore	Arthur D. Sutton
Party	Democratic	Republican
Popular vote	1,167,630	431,717
Percentage	73.01%	26.99%
Recorder of Deeds before election
Eugene Moore
Democratic
Elected Recorder of Deeds
Eugene Moore
Democratic

In the 2000 Cook County Recorder of Deeds election, incumbent Recorder of Deeds Eugene Moore, a Democrat, was elected to his first full term. Moore had first been appointed in 1999 (after Jesse White resigned to become Illinois Secretary of State).

=== Primaries ===
==== Democratic ====
Candidate

The following candidate ran for the Democratic Party nomination for Clerk of the Circuit Court:

- Eugene "Gene" Moore, incumbent

Results

Cook County Recorder of Deeds Democratic primary
Party	Candidate	Votes	%
Democratic	Eugene "Gene" Moore (incumbent)	353,823	100
Total votes		353,823	100

==== Republican ====
Candidate

The following candidate ran for the Democratic Party nomination for Clerk of the Circuit Court:

- Arthur D. Sutton

Results

Cook County Recorder of Deeds Republican primary
Party	Candidate	Votes	%
Republican	Arthur D. Sutton	95,678	100
Total votes		95,678	100

=== General election ===
Cook County Recorder of Deeds election
Party	Candidate	Votes	%
Democratic	Eugene "Gene" Moore (incumbent)	1,167,630	73.01
Republican	Arthur D. Sutton	431,717	26.99
Total votes		1,599,347	100

== State's Attorney ==
2000 Cook County State's Attorney election
- November 7, 2000
- Turnout: 61.42%
Candidate	Richard A. Devine	David P. Gaughan
Party	Democratic	Republican
Popular vote	1,337,578	370,678
Percentage	78.30%	21.70%
State's Attorney before election
Richard A. Devine
Democratic
Elected State's Attorney
Richard A. Devine
Democratic

In the 2000 Cook County State's Attorney election, incumbent first-term State's Attorney Richard A. Devine, a Democrat, was reelected.

=== Primaries ===
==== Democratic ====
Candidate

The following candidate ran for the Democratic Party nomination for Clerk of the Circuit Court:

- Richard A. Devine, incumbent

Cook County State’s Attorney Democratic primary
Party	Candidate	Votes	%
Democratic	Richard A. Devine (incumbent)	379,990	100
Total votes		379,990	100

==== Republican ====
Candidate

The following candidate ran for the Republican Party nomination Cook County State's Attorney:

- David P. Gaughan, former Assistant Cook County State's Attorney (1989–1999)

Cook County State’s Attorney Republican primary
Party	Candidate	Votes	%
Republican	David P. Gaughan	96,112	100
Total votes		96,112	100

=== General election ===
Cook County State’s Attorney election
Party	Candidate	Votes	%
Democratic	Richard A. Devine (incumbent)	1,337,578	78.30
Republican	David P. Gaughan	370,678	21.70
Total votes		1,708,256	100

== Water Reclamation District Board ==
2000 Metropolitan Water Reclamation District of Greater Chicago election
- November 7, 2000

4 of 9 seats on the Metropolitan Water Reclamation District of Greater Chicago 5 seats needed for a majority
	First party	Second party
Party	Democratic	Republican
Seats after	9	0

In the 2000 Metropolitan Water Reclamation District of Greater Chicago election, four of the nine seats on the Metropolitan Water Reclamation District of Greater Chicago board were up for election. Three were up in a regularly scheduled at-large election, while a fourth seat was up in for a separate special election.

== Judicial elections ==
Pasrtisan elections were held for judgeships on the Circuit Court of Cook County due to vacancies. Retention elections were also held for the Circuit Court.

Partisan elections were also held for subcircuit courts judgeships due to vacancies. Retention elections were held for other judgeships.

== Ballot questions ==
One ballot question was included on ballots county-wide during the March primary.

=== Tobacco Settlement ===
A ballot question involving tobacco settlement funds was included on the March primary ballot.

Tobacco Settlement
Candidate	Votes	%
Yes	421,260	86.70
No	64,608	13.30
Total votes	485,868	100

== Other elections ==
Coinciding with the primaries, elections were held to elect both the Democratic and Republican committeemen for the wards of Chicago.

== See also ==
- 2000 Illinois elections
