= 2004 Cook County, Illinois, elections =

- November 2, 2004
- Turnout: 74.75%

The Cook County, Illinois, general election was held on November 2, 2004.

Primaries were held March 16, 2004.

Elections were held for Clerk of the Circuit Court, Recorder of Deeds, State's Attorney, Board of Review district 3, three seats on the Water Reclamation District Board, and judgeships on the Circuit Court of Cook County.

== Election information ==
2004 was a presidential election year in the United States. The primaries and general elections for Cook County races coincided with those for federal races (President, House, and Senate) and those for state elections.

=== Voter turnout ===
==== Primary election ====
Voter turnout in Cook County during the primaries was 35.02%. The city of Chicago saw 38.58% turnout and suburban Cook County saw 31.34% turnout.

Vote totals of primaries
Primary	Chicago vote totals	Suburban Cook County vote totals	Total Cook County vote totals
Democratic	484,622	279,538	764,160
Republican	27,893	117,554	145,447
Green	72	4	76
Libertarian	71	3	74
Nonpartisan	2,310	9,016	11,326
Total	514,971	406,115	921,086

==== General election ====
The general election saw 74.75% turnout, with 2,088,727 ballots cast. Chicago saw 75.13% turnout and suburban Cook County saw 74.36% turnout.

== Clerk of the Circuit Court ==
2004 Clerk of the Circuit Court of Cook County election
- November 2, 2004
- Turnout: 65.98%
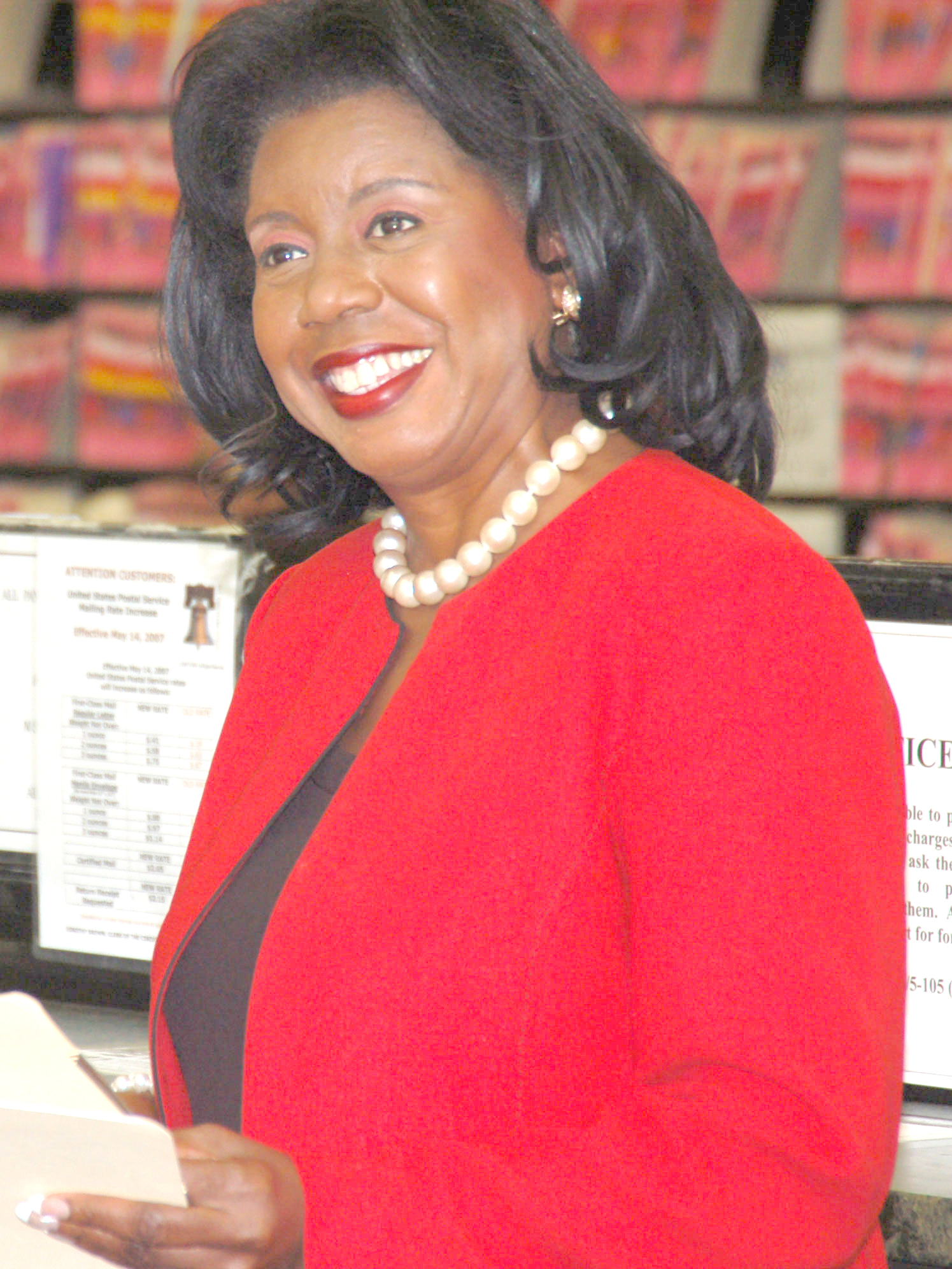

Candidate	Dorothy A. Brown	Judith A. Kleiderman
Party	Democratic	Republican
Popular vote	1,365,285	478,222
Percentage	74.06%	25.94%
Clerk before election
Dorothy A. Brown
Democratic
Elected Clerk
Dorothy A. Brown
Democratic

In the 2004 Clerk of the Circuit Court of Cook County election, incumbent first-term Clerk Dorothy A. Brown, a Democrat, was reelected.

=== Primaries ===
==== Democratic ====
Clerk of the Circuit Court of Cook County Democratic primary
Party	Candidate	Votes	%
Democratic	Dorothy A. Brown (incumbent)	479,438	74.52
Democratic	Jerry Orbach	163,896	25.48
Total votes		643,334	100

==== Republican ====
Clerk of the Circuit Court of Cook County Republican primary
Party	Candidate	Votes	%
Republican	Judith A. Kleiderman	116,238	100
Total votes		116,238	100

=== General election ===
Endorsements

Dorothy Brown (D)

Newspapers

- Chicago Tribune

Results

Clerk of the Circuit Court of Cook County election
Party	Candidate	Votes	%	±%
Democratic	Dorothy A. Brown (incumbent)	1,365,285	74.06	+1.12
Republican	Judith A. Kleiderman	478,222	25.94	−1.12
Total votes		1,843,507	100	

== Recorder of Deeds ==
2004 Cook County Recorder of Deeds election
- November 2, 2004
- Turnout: 64.94%

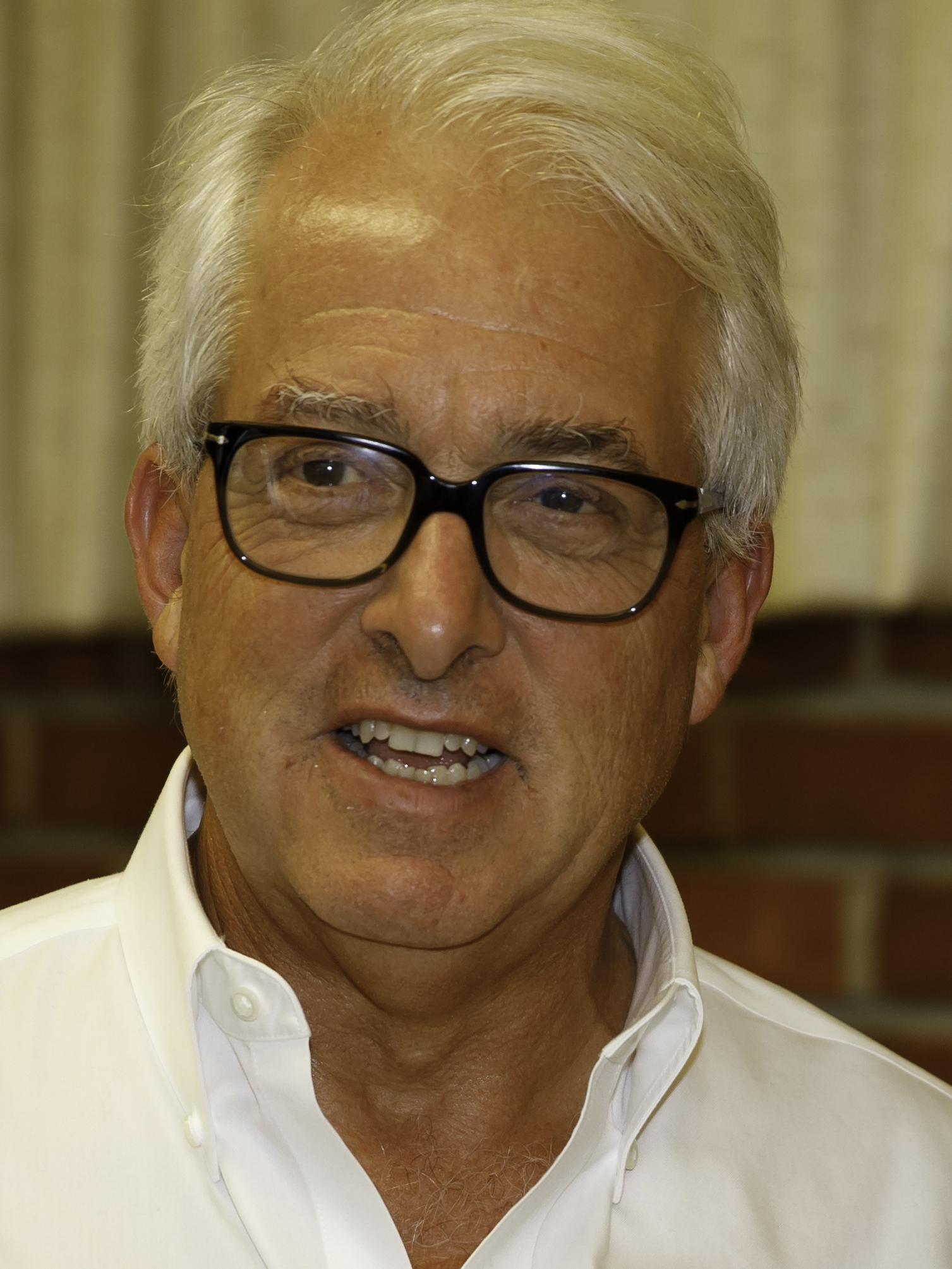
Candidate	Eugene Moore	John H. Cox
Party	Democratic	Republican
Popular vote	1,283,762	530,945
Percentage	70.74%	29.26%
Recorder of Deeds before election
Eugene Moore
Democratic
Elected Recorder of Deeds
Eugene Moore
Democratic

In the 2004 Cook County Recorder of Deeds election, incumbent Recorder of Deeds Eugene Moore, a Democrat, was reelected. Moore had first been appointed in 1999 (after Jesse White resigned to become Illinois Secretary of State), and had been elected to a full-term in 2000.

=== Primaries ===
==== Democratic ====
Cook County Recorder of Deeds Democratic primary
Party	Candidate	Votes	%
Democratic	Eugene "Gene" Moore (incumbent)	325,906	100
Total votes		325,906	100

==== Republican ====
Cook County Recorder of Deeds Republican primary
Party	Candidate	Votes	%
Republican	John H. Cox	117,731	100
Total votes		117,731	100

=== General election ===
Republican nominee Cox had declared that his intent in seeking the office was to push for its elimination, as he argued that the office was an unnecessary duplication of services and had become a "model of waste and corruption".

Endorsements

John H. Cox (R)

Newspapers

- Chicago Tribune

Results

Cook County Recorder of Deeds election
Party	Candidate	Votes	%
Democratic	Eugene "Gene" Moore (incumbent)	1,283,762	70.74
Republican	John H. Cox	530,945	29.26
Total votes		1,814,707	100

== State's Attorney ==
2004 Cook County State's Attorney election
- November 2, 2004
- Turnout: 66.83%
Candidate	Richard A. Devine	Phillip Spiwak
Party	Democratic	Republican
Popular vote	1,483,280	384,082
Percentage	79.43%	20.57%
State's Attorney before election
Richard A. Devine
Democratic
Elected State's Attorney
Richard A. Devine
Democratic

In the 2004 Cook County State's Attorney election, incumbent second-term State's Attorney Richard A. Devine, a Democrat, was reelected.

=== Primaries ===
==== Democratic ====
In the Democratic primary, incumbent Dick Devine defeated challenger Tommy H. Brewer (who had previously, in 1994, run unsuccessfully for the Democratic nomination Cook County Sheriff).

Cook County State’s Attorney Democratic primary
Party	Candidate	Votes	%
Democratic	Richard A. Devine (incumbent)	505,791	79.06
Democratic	Tommy H. Brewer	133,978	20.94
Total votes		639,769	100

==== Republican ====
Cook County State’s Attorney Republican primary
Party	Candidate	Votes	%
Republican	Philip Spiwak	116,365	100
Total votes		116,365	100

=== General election ===
Endorsements

Richard Devine (D)

Newspapers

- Chicago Tribune

Results

Cook County State’s Attorney election
Party	Candidate	Votes	%	±%
Democratic	Richard A. Devine (incumbent)	1,483,280	79.43	+1.13
Republican	Philip Spiwak	384,082	20.57	−1.13
Total votes		1,867,362	100	

== Cook County Board of Review ==
2004 Cook County Board of Review election
- November 2, 2004

2 of 3 seats on the Cook County Board of Review 2 seats needed for a majority
	First party	Second party
Party	Democratic	Republican
Seats before	2	1
Seats after	2	1
Seat change	Steady	Steady
Seats up	1	0
Races won	1	0

In the 2004 Cook County Board of Review election, one seat, Democratic-held, was up for election. The incumbent won reelection.

The Cook County Board of Review has its three seats rotate the length of terms. In a staggered fashion (in which no two seats have coinciding two-year terms), the seats rotate between two consecutive four-year terms and a two-year term.

=== 3rd district ===
Incumbent second-term member Robert Shaw, a Democrat last reelected in 2002, lost reelection, being unseated by in the Democratic primary by Larry R. Rogers, Jr., who went on to win the general election unopposed. Rogers' margin-of-victory over Shaw in the Democratic primary was narrow, at 1,087 votes (equal to 0.37 of votes cast). This election was to a four-year term.

==== Primaries ====
===== Democratic =====
Cook County Board of Review 3rd district Democratic primary
Party	Candidate	Votes	%
Democratic	Larry R. Rogers, Jr.	148,987	50.18
Democratic	Robert Shaw (incumbent)	147,900	49.81
Total votes		296,887	100

===== Republican =====
No candidates, ballot-certified or formal write-in, ran in the Republican primary.

==== General election ====
Cook County Board of Review 3rd district election
Party	Candidate	Votes	%
Democratic	Larry R. Rogers, Jr.	518,543	100
Total votes		518,543	100

== Water Reclamation District Board ==
2004 Metropolitan Water Reclamation District of Greater Chicago election
- November 2, 2004

3 of 9 seats on the Metropolitan Water Reclamation District of Greater Chicago 5 seats needed for a majority
	First party	Second party	Third party
Party	Democratic	Republican	Green
Seats before	9	0	0
Seats after	9	0	0
Seat change	Steady	Steady	Steady
Seats up	3	0	0
Races won	3	0	0

In the 2004 Metropolitan Water Reclamation District of Greater Chicago election, three of the nine seats on the Metropolitan Water Reclamation District of Greater Chicago board were up for election in an at-large election.

== Judicial elections ==
Pasrtisan elections were held for judgeships on the Circuit Court of Cook County due to vacancies. Retention elections were also held for the Circuit Court.

Partisan elections were also held for subcircuit courts judgeships due to vacancies. Retention elections were held for other judgeships.

== Other elections ==
Coinciding with the primaries, elections were held to elect both the Democratic and Republican committeemen for the wards of Chicago.

== See also ==
- 2004 Illinois elections
