= Ed Smith (alderman) =

American politician (21st century)

- Occupation: Alderman of the 28th Ward

Ed H. Smith was alderman of the 28th ward in Chicago from 1983 to 2010.

== Early life ==
Smith earned his bachelor's degree from Alcorn State University in Lorman, Mississippi and his master's degree from Northeastern Illinois University. Smith has written two books: Love the Town Couldn’t Stop and Almost to Late. Smith is also the executive producer of the film, "Love Relations."

== Public service ==
Before becoming an alderman, Smith was a school teacher and worked for the Chicago Economic Development Corporation.

== Aldermanic career ==
Smith was elected alderman in 1983 after he ran unsuccessfully in 1972, 1976, 1979 and 1980. In that 1983 election, running alongside Harold Washington, he ran a progressive campaign publicly committed to smashing the old system of patronage and corruption within Chicago.

As alderman, Smith was the main sponsor of Chicago's Smoking Ban, passed in 2005 by a vote of 47–1. He also pushed the state legislature to pass a statewide ban.

Smith was remarkably free of scandal in the City Council; at twenty-seven years, he had the longest tenure of any elected African-American official in Cook County, and he was never mentioned or implicated in any of the city council's corruption scandals.

Smith was also Chicago's representative on the Transportation, Infrastructure and Service Steering Committee to the National League of Cities. The National League of Cities works towards "strengthening and promoting cities as centers of opportunity, leadership, and governance."

Smith was Chairman of the Health Committee, where he led campaigns to promote awareness about sexually transmitted infections (STIs). Smith was vice-chairman on the Zoning committees, and served on five additional committees: Budget and Government Operations; Finance, Buildings; Committees, Rules and Ethics; and Aviation.

Smith ran in the Democratic primary for Cook County recorder of deeds in 2008, but did not win, losing to the incumbent recorder of deeds Eugene Moore. Smith's candidacy had received endorsements from prominent figures, including Chicago Mayor Richard M. Daley (who rarely gave endorsements in contested county primaries), Illinois Senate President Emil Jones, and business executive John W. Rogers Jr.

Smith announced his retirement from the city council in November 2010, effective at the end of that month.
