= Cook County State's Attorney =

Political and law enforcement official for Cook County, Illinois, US

State's Attorney of Cook County
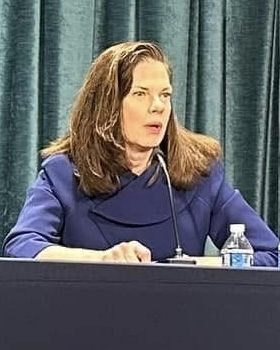
- Incumbent; Eileen O'Neill Burke since December 1, 2024
- Term length: 4 years
- Salary: $198,073 (2020)
- Website: Office of the Cook County State's Attorney

The Cook County State's Attorney is the chief prosecutor for Cook County, Illinois. The State's Attorney oversees the second-largest prosecutor's office in the United States, with over 600 attorneys and 1,200 employees. The office's responsibilities include directing Illinois criminal prosecutions in the county, filing legal actions to enforce child support orders, consumer protection, and assistance for victims of domestic violence.

The State's Attorney is elected for a term of four years. The current incumbent is Eileen O'Neill Burke, who was first elected in 2024.

== Subdivisions of the state's attorney's office ==
- The Criminal Prosecutions Bureau is the largest bureau in the office. The bureau is divided into three divisions: Felony Trial, Sexual Crimes, and Municipal. Each division is further divided into specialized units located throughout the county. The bureau is also charged with prosecuting thousands of domestic violence cases each year as well as cases of child sexual abuse through the Child Advocacy Division.
- The Juvenile Justice Bureau contains two divisions: Delinquency and Child Protection. The Delinquency Division handles cases involving juveniles who have been charged with committing misdemeanors or felonies. The Child Protection Division files civil actions against parents and guardians who abuse or neglect their children.
- The Narcotics Bureau consists of the following units: Preliminary Hearings/Grand Jury, Felony Trial, Narcotics Courtrooms, Drug Treatment Programs, Complex Narcotics Prosecution, and Asset Forfeitures.
- The Special Prosecutions Bureau is responsible for investigating and prosecuting complex criminal and public corruption cases. It includes units for Auto Theft, Gang Crimes, Government and Financial Crimes, Organized Crime/Cold Case, and Professional Standards. It also initiates civil and criminal lawsuits to protect individuals and the general public interest. Consumer Fraud and Seniors and Persons with Disabilities are also units in the bureau.
- The Civil Actions Bureau defends the county and its officeholders and employees in civil suits, provides a full range of legal services for all county agencies, and represents the county's interests in actions brought to collect monies owed for taxes and fees. The bureau has sections dedicated to Child Support Services, Complex Litigation, Labor and Employment, Civil Rights/Torts, Workers' Compensation, Municipal Litigation (including Transactions/Health Law), and Real Estate Tax Litigation.
- The Investigations and Administrative Services Bureaus supply investigative, technical and administrative assistance to the office.
- The Administrative Services Bureau supports all the other bureaus with administrative personnel and contains the office's national award-winning Victim Witness Assistance Program that provides services to crime victims.

== Appearance in fiction ==
A fictionalized version of the office is a major backdrop in Presumed Innocent, TV series The Good Wife, and the Chicago franchise.

== List of Cook County State's Attorneys ==
State's attorney	Term in office	Party	Notes
Patrick Ballingall	1845–1849		
Daniel McElroy	1849–1857		
Carlos Haven	1857–1863	Died in office	
Joseph Knox	1863–1864		
Charles H. Reed	1864–1876		
Luther L. Mills	1876–1884	Republican	
Julius Grinnell	1884–1887		
Joel M. Longnecker	1887–1892	Republican	
Jacob J. Kern	1892–1896	Democratic	
Charles S. Deneen	1896–1904	Republican	
John J. Healy	1904–1908	Republican	
John E. W. Wayman	1908–1912	Republican	
Maclay Hoyne	1912–1920	Democratic	
Robert E. Crowe	1920–1928	Republican	
John A. Swanson	1928–1932	Republican	
Thomas J. Courtney	1932–1944	Democratic	
William J. Tuohy	1944–1947	Democratic	
Richard B. Austin	1947–1948 (acting)		
John S. Boyle	1948–1952	Democratic	
John Gutknecht	1952–1956		
Ben Adamowski	1956–1960	Republican	
Daniel P. Ward	1960–1966	Democratic	
John J. Stamos	1966–1968		
Edward Hanrahan	1968–1972	Democratic	
Bernard Carey	1972–1980	Republican	
Richard M. Daley	1980–1989	Democratic	Elected in 1980, 1984, and 1988; resigned upon winning the 1989 Chicago mayoral special election.
Cecil A. Partee	1989–1990	Democratic	Appointed to replace Richard Daley, and lost the 1990 special election.
Jack O'Malley	1990–1996	Republican	Elected in 1990 (special election) and 1992. Lost re-election in 1996.
Richard A. " Dick" Devine	December 1, 1996 – December 1, 2008	Democratic	Elected in 1996, 2000, and 2004. Did not seek re-election in 2008.
Anita Alvarez	December 1, 2008 – December 1, 2016	Democratic	Elected in 2008 and 2012. Lost re-election in 2016.
Kim Foxx	December 1, 2016 – December 1, 2024	Democratic	Elected in 2016 and 2020. Did not seek re-election in 2024.
Eileen O'Neill Burke	December 1, 2024 – present	Democratic	Elected in 2024.

== Election results ==
Cook County State's Attorney general elections
Year	Winning candidate	Party	Vote (pct)	Opponent	Party	Vote (pct)	Opponent	Party	Vote (pct)	Opponent	Party	Vote (pct)	Opponent	Party	Vote (pct)	Opponent	Party	Vote (pct)
1900	Charles S. Deneen	Republican	205,709 (51.94%)	Julius Goldzier	Democratic	178,696 (45.12%)	Thomas J. Morgan	Social Democratic	6,227 (1.57%)	Walter Hawk	Prohibition	5,236 (1.32%)	C. H. Becker	People's	153 (0.04%)			
1904	John J. Healy	Republican	206,487 (53.13%)	George A. Trude	Democratic	132,811 (34.17%)	Seymour Stedman	Socialist	39,736 (10.22%)	M. C. Harper	Prohibition	5,630 (1.45%)	Henry Sale	Socialist Labor	2,547 (0.66%)	L. A. Shaw	People's	1,468 (0.38%)
1908	John E. W. Wayman	Republican	197,805 (48.57%)	Jacob J. Kern	Democratic	146,133 (35.89%)	William Street	Prohibition	45,528 (11.18%)	Seymour Stedman	Socialist	17,471 (4.29%)	Charles H. Mitchell	independent	9,279 (2.28%)			
1912	Maclay Hoyne	Democratic	122,419 (27.85%)	Lewis Rinaker	Republican	113,181 (25.74%)	William A. Cunnea	Socialist	107,647 (24.49%)	George I. Haight	Progressive	93,495 (21.27%)	John H. Hill	Prohibition	2,895 (0.66%)			
1916	Maclay Hoyne	Democratic	236,384 (44.57%)	Harry B. Miller	Republican	191,456 (36.10%)	William A. Cunnea	Socialist	102,579 (19.34%)									
1920	Robert E. Crowe	Republican	525,115 (58.44%)	Michael L. Igoe	Democratic	319,236 (35.53%)	William A. Cunnea	Socialist	50,766 (5.65%)	John C. Teevan	Farmer–Labor	3,463 (0.39%)						
1924... 1968	[data missing]																	
1972	Bernard Carey	Republican		Edward Hanrahan	Democratic													
1976	Bernard Carey	Republican		Edward J. Egan	Democratic													
1980	Richard M. Daley	Democratic	1,058,529 (50.39%)	Bernard Carey	Republican	1,042,287 (49.61%)												
1984	Richard M. Daley	Democratic	1,418,775 (65.98%)	Richard J. Brzeczek	Republican	731,634 (34.02%)												
1988	Richard M. Daley	Democratic	1,303,906 (66.70%)	Terrance Gainer	Republican	650,942 (33.30%)												
1990	Jack O'Malley	Republican	692,192 (52.96%)	Cecil A. Partee	Democratic	511,424 (39.13%)	Janice H. Robinson	Harold Washington Party	103,353 (7.91%)									
1992	Jack O'Malley	Republican	1,272,939 (61.27%)	Patrick J. O'Connor	Democratic	804,528 (38.73%)												
1996	Richard A. Devine	Democratic	805,659 (47.88%)	Jack O'Malley	Republican	694,306 (41.26%)	R. Eugene Pincham	Justice Party	156,695 (9.31%)	Lawrence C. Redman Jr.	Harold Washington Party	26,131 (1.55%)						
2000	Richard A. Devine	Democratic	1,337,578 (78.30%)	David P. Gaughan	Republican	370,678 (21.70%)												
2004	Richard A. Devine	Democratic	1,483,280 (79.43%)	Philip Spiwak	Republican	384,082 (20.57%)												
2008	Anita Alvarez	Democratic	1,378,452 (69.90%)	Tony Peraica	Republican	494,611 (25.08%)	Thomas O'Brien	Green	99,101 (5.03%)									
2012	Anita Alvarez	Democratic	1,427,145 (77.05%)	Lori S. Yokoyama	Republican	421,810 (22.77%)												
2016	Kim Foxx	Democratic	1,459,087 (72.06%)	Christopher E.K. Pfannkuche	Republican	565,671 (27.94%)												
2020	Kim Foxx	Democratic	1,194,299 (54.21%)	Pat O'Brien	Republican	861,108 (39.08%)	Brian Dennehy	Libertarian	147,769 (6.71%)									
2024

== See also ==
- Circuit Court of Cook County
- Cook County Sheriff's Office
