= 2008 Illinois elections =

- November 4, 2008
- Turnout: 71.60%

Elections were held in Illinois on November 4, 2008.

Primaries were held February 5, 2008.

== Election information ==
=== Turnout ===
==== Primary election ====
For the primary election, turnout was 40.89%, with 2,986,982 votes cast.

Turnout by county

County	Registration	Votes cast	Turnout
Adams	42,024	14,154	33.68%
Alexander	7,743	2,526	32.62%
Bond	11,258	3,499	31.08%
Boone	33,607	11,545	34.35%
Brown	3,262	1,450	44.45%
Bureau	24,159	7,301	30.22%
Calhoun	4,108	1,592	38.75%
Carroll	12,143	3,469	28.57%
Cass	9,490	2,188	23.06%
Champaign	109,946	39,156	35.61%
Christian	21,272	7,848	36.89%
Clark	12,624	4,199	33.26%
Clay	9,390	3,582	38.15%
Clinton	26,213	6,851	26.14%
Coles	28,826	10,180	35.32%
Cook (Note: For more on Cook County primary turnout, see 2008 Cook County, Illinois elections#Voter turnout)	2,658,099	1,274,569	47.95%
Crawford	13,807	4,457	32.28%
Cumberland	8,821	2,616	29.66%
DeKalb	52,754	23,612	44.76%
DeWitt	10,863	4,885	44.97%
Douglas	11,742	4,222	35.96%
DuPage	549,621	244,032	44.4%
Edgar	12,704	4,773	37.57%
Edwards	4,369	1,641	37.56%
Effingham	23,050	7,936	34.43%
Fayette	15,280	4,770	31.22%
Ford	8,619	3,237	37.56%
Franklin	27,167	11,720	43.14%
Fulton	26,485	9,033	34.11%
Gallatin	4,264	2,203	51.67%
Greene	9,644	2,811	29.15%
Grundy	30,311	10,635	35.09%
Hamilton	6,563	3,266	49.76%
Hancock	13,475	5,362	39.79%
Hardin	3,811	1,750	45.92%
Henderson	5,414	1,919	35.45%
Henry	36,015	10,762	29.88%
Iroquois	20,187	6,171	30.57%
Jackson	41,323	12,131	29.36%
Jasper	14,959	2,777	18.56%
Jefferson	24,758	10,744	43.4%
Jersey	16,402	4,803	29.28%
Jo Daviess	16,819	5,508	32.75%
Johnson	7,596	3,922	51.63%
Kane	258,902	101,332	39.14%
Kankakee	64,925	18,849	29.03%
Kendall	58,570	22,923	39.14%
Knox	33,486	12,240	36.55%
Lake	377,738	147,424	39.03%
LaSalle	70,265	24,372	34.69%
Lawrence	10,145	3,110	30.66%
Lee	47,146	8,262	17.52%
Livingston	23,146	8,133	35.14%
Logan	19,496	7,357	37.74%
Macon	69,372	26,993	38.91%
Macoupin	32,641	10,440	31.98%
Madison	163,584	60,403	36.92%
Marion	24,959	9,233	36.99%
Marshall	8,447	3,486	41.27%
Mason	10,447	3,786	36.24%
Massac	11,434	4,348	38.03%
McDonough	17,882	6,528	36.51%
McHenry	188,449	65,232	34.62%
McLean	89,510	38,116	42.58%
Menard	9,303	3,222	34.63%
Mercer	14,018	4,216	30.08%
Monroe	22,972	8,065	35.11%
Montgomery	18,629	6,170	33.12%
Morgan	23,947	6,590	27.52%
Moultrie	8,453	3,011	35.62%
Ogle	38,584	13,322	34.53%
Peoria	113,614	42,887	37.75%
Perry	14,590	4,807	32.95%
Piatt	11,369	4,113	36.18%
Pike	12,585	3,617	28.74%
Pope	3,490	1,304	37.36%
Pulaski	6,615	2,007	30.34%
Putnam	4,566	1,714	37.54%
Randolph	24,153	7,149	29.6%
Richland	13,463	3,742	27.79%
Rock Island	117,900	35,990	30.53%
Saline	16,402	7,525	45.88%
Sangamon	134,911	40,607	30.1%
Schuyler	5,301	2,013	37.97%
Scott	3,994	1,378	34.5%
Shelby	14,377	5,315	36.97%
Stark	5,179	1,470	28.38%
St. Clair	186,756	58,617	31.39%
Stephenson	33,178	10,111	30.48%
Tazewell	96,705	32,412	33.52%
Union	15,118	6,403	42.35%
Vermilion	46,793	14,177	30.3%
Wabash	9,221	2,561	27.77%
Warren	12,488	4,213	33.74%
Washington	11,683	3,989	34.14%
Wayne	12,368	4,917	39.76%
White	11,312	3,911	34.57%
Whiteside	48,987	12,777	26.08%
Will	330,732	144,040	43.55%
Williamson	40,948	18,198	44.44%
Winnebago	174,484	61,303	35.13%
Woodford	23,844	10,745	45.06%
Total	7,304,563	2,986,982	40.89%

==== General election ====
For the general election, turnout was 71.60%, with 5,577,509 votes cast.

Turnout by county

County	Registration	Votes cast	Turnout%
Adams	44,329	31,107	70.17%
Alexander	7,926	4,030	50.85%
Bond	11,756	8,034	68.34%
Boone	32,771	22,317	68.1%
Brown	3,383	2,625	77.59%
Bureau	26,861	17,291	64.37%
Calhoun	3,952	2,773	70.17%
Carroll	12,012	7,734	64.39%
Cass	9,650	5,479	56.78%
Champaign	123,150	84,804	68.86%
Christian	22,088	15,253	69.06%
Clark	12,882	8,382	65.07%
Clay	9,665	6,577	68.05%
Clinton	27,262	17,492	64.16%
Coles	32,867	23,287	70.85%
Cook (Note: For more on Cook County general election turnout, see 2008 Cook County, Illinois elections#Voter turnout)	2,933,502	2,162,240	73.71%
Crawford	14,197	9,246	65.13%
Cumberland	9,065	5,390	59.46%
DeKalb	60,718	45,178	74.41%
DeWitt	11,468	7,886	68.77%
Douglas	12,193	8,443	69.24%
DuPage	551,280	420,397	76.26%
Edgar	13,004	8,345	64.17%
Edwards	4,576	3,418	74.69%
Effingham	22,353	16,999	76.05%
Fayette	15,589	9,815	62.96%
Ford	9,059	6,435	71.03%
Franklin	28,247	18,970	67.16%
Fulton	26,982	16,489	61.11%
Gallatin	4,316	2,948	68.3%
Greene	9,446	5,881	62.26%
Grundy	30,234	22,356	73.94%
Hamilton	6,432	4,452	69.22%
Hancock	13,674	9,570	69.99%
Hardin	3,910	2,332	59.64%
Henderson	5,527	3,875	70.11%
Henry	37,351	24,995	66.92%
Iroquois	20,695	13,697	66.19%
Jackson	45,225	25,795	57.04%
Jasper	7,511	5,229	69.62%
Jefferson	25,816	17,454	67.61%
Jersey	17,113	10,723	62.66%
Jo Daviess	16,529	11,878	71.86%
Johnson	7,984	6,012	75.3%
Kane	263,876	194,981	73.89%
Kankakee	65,279	48,333	74.04%
Kendall	67,307	46,875	69.64%
Knox	34,898	24,284	69.59%
Lake	405,041	301,077	74.33%
LaSalle	73,689	50,775	68.9%
Lawrence	10,497	6,661	63.46%
Lee	26,428	16,499	62.43%
Livingston	23,826	15,752	66.11%
Logan	19,859	13,029	65.61%
Macon	73,597	51,644	70.17%
Macoupin	32,910	22,606	68.69%
Madison	178,014	129,880	72.96%
Marion	26,084	17,562	67.33%
Marshall	8,777	6,402	72.94%
Mason	10,527	6,889	65.44%
Massac	11,759	7,320	62.25%
McDonough	19,569	13,158	67.24%
McHenry	199,378	140,002	70.22%
McLean	100,157	76,231	76.11%
Menard	9,594	6,531	68.07%
Mercer	14,087	8,943	63.48%
Monroe	24,280	18,241	75.13%
Montgomery	19,055	13,039	68.43%
Morgan	25,007	15,466	61.85%
Moultrie	8,782	6,312	71.87%
Ogle	40,453	25,062	61.95%
Peoria	124,116	83,008	66.88%
Perry	15,054	10,148	67.41%
Piatt	11,921	9,065	76.04%
Pike	12,991	7,712	59.36%
Pope	3,399	2,272	66.84%
Pulaski	6,679	3,333	49.9%
Putnam	4,663	3,369	72.25%
Randolph	24,624	15,401	62.54%
Richland	13,684	7,751	56.64%
Rock Island	114,645	68,933	60.13%
Saline	17,179	11,691	68.05%
Sangamon	138,299	100,679	72.8%
Schuyler	5,473	3,876	70.82%
Scott	3,976	2,643	66.47%
Shelby	15,158	11,004	72.6%
Stark	5,212	2,945	56.5%
St. Clair	201,095	126,682	63%
Stephenson	34,535	21,798	63.12%
Tazewell	99,868	64,319	64.4%
Union	15,337	9,306	60.68%
Vermilion	49,863	33,249	66.68%
Wabash	9,391	5,860	62.4%
Warren	12,970	8,117	62.58%
Washington	12,396	8,040	64.86%
Wayne	12,640	8,172	64.65%
White	11,566	7,571	65.46%
Whiteside	43,590	27,142	62.27%
Will	373,847	288,709	77.23%
Williamson	43,676	30,519	69.88%
Winnebago	188,795	127,369	67.46%
Woodford	25,578	19,639	76.78%
Total	7,789,500	5,577,509	71.6%

== Federal elections ==
=== United States President ===
Illinois voted for the Democratic ticket of Barack Obama and Joe Biden.

This was the fifth consecutive presidential election in which Illinois had voted for the Democratic ticket.

=== United States Senate ===
Incumbent Democrat Dick Durbin was reelected to a third term.

=== United States House ===
All 19 of Illinois’ seats in the United States House of Representatives were up for election in 2008.

The Democratic Party flipped one Republican-held seat, making the composition of Illinois' House delegation 11 Democrats and 8 Republicans.

== State elections ==
=== State Senate ===
One-third of the seats of the Illinois Senate were up for election in 2008.

=== State House of Representatives ===
All of the seats in the Illinois House of Representatives were up for election in 2008.

=== Judicial elections ===
Judicial elections were held.

=== Ballot measure ===
Illinois voters voted on a single ballot measure in 1998. In order to be approved, the measure required either 60% support among those specifically voting on the amendment or 50% support among all ballots cast in the elections.

This was the first time since the 1998 Illinois elections that a statewide ballot measure was presented to Illinois voters.

==== Proposed call for a Constitutional Convention ====
A measure which would call for a state constitutional convention failed. Article XIV of the Constitution of Illinois requires that Illinois voters be asked at least every 20 years if they desire a constitutional convention, thus this election was constitutionally required to be held.

Proposed call for a Constitutional Convention
Option	Votes	% of votes on referendum	% of all ballots cast
For	1,493,203	32.78	26.96
Against	3,062,724	67.23	55.29
Total votes	4,555,927	100	82.25
Voter turnout	58.49%		

== Local elections ==
Local elections were held. These included county elections, such as the Cook County elections.
