= Eugene Moore (politician) =

American politician (1942–2016)

Cook County Recorder of Deeds
- In office January 1999 – December 2012
- Preceded by: Jesse White
- Succeeded by: Karen Yarbrough

Member of the Illinois House of Representatives from the 7th district
- In office January 1993 – January 1999
- Preceded by: Ann Stepan
- Succeeded by: Wanda Sharp

Personal details
- Born: July 19, 1942 Baltzer, Mississippi, U.S.
- Died: June 14, 2016 (age 73) Maywood, Illinois, U.S.
- Party: Democratic

Eugene M. Moore (July 19, 1942 – June 14, 2016) was a politician who served both as Cook County recorder of deeds and as a member of the Illinois House of Representatives.

== Early life ==
Moore was born July 19, 1942, in Baltzer, Mississippi, the son of Sara Ella Burrell and Joseph Moore.

When Moore was a young child, his family moved to Maywood, Illinois. Moore would from then on be a lifelong resident of Maywood.

Moore attended Maywood's Washington Elementary School. Moore graduated from Proviso East High School.

Moore earned a football scholarship to Otero Junior College. However, an injury ended his football career at Otero, and he returned to Maywood. A family member, after Moore's death, would share their belief that Moore had left Otero Junior College mostly due to feeling homesick and desiring to return to his high school sweetheart, who he would eventually marry.

Moore worked for some time with the American Can Company in Maywood. He then began what would be a long career as an account manager at Metropolitan Life Insurance.

== Early political career ==
In the 1980s, Moore became active in Democratic Party politics. He first ran unsuccessfully be a Maywood trustee. In 1988, Moore was elected a Proviso Township trustee.

== State representative ==
Elected in 1992, Moore became the first African American to represent the 7th district in the Illinois House of Representatives. Moore had successfully run in a district that had been redistricted in such a way as to make it feasible for the Proviso area to elect a black representative. His candidacy received support from individuals such as then-Cook County commissioner Danny K. Davis.

In 1998, Moore fended off a serious primary challenge by Karen Yarbrough. Also in 1998, he was elected Proviso Township Democratic committeeman, unseating Gary G. Marinaro. He would hold this party post in addition to his other offices until 2006, when he would be unseated from this party post.

== Cook County Recorder of Deeds ==
In January 1999, Moore was appointed Cook County recorder of deeds, filling the vacancy left when Jesse White resigned to become Illinois Secretary of State. His appointment to replace White as recorder of deeds had been backed by county political heavyweights such as John Stroger and John P. Daley. Moore would be elected outright to his first full term in 2000, and reelected in 2004 and 2008.

Moore worked to overhaul the office's efforts to fight property fraud and theft. He also worked to modernize the data-collecting and processing capabilities of the office.

In 2006, Karen Yarbrough defeated Moore to become the Democratic committeeman for Proviso Township. Yarbrough had previously unsuccessfully challenged Moore for the post of Proviso Township Democratic committeeman in 2002.

Moore retired in 2012, with fellow Democrat Karen Yarbrough being elected to succeed him as Cook County recorder of deeds in that year's election.

== Nonprofit work ==
Moore was active in local charities and organizations, including the Boys & Girls Club of West Cook County and John C. Vaughn Scholarship Fund.

== Personal life ==
Moore was divorced from his former wife. Moore had three children, daughters Dowanna and Natalie and son Eric. At the time of his death, he had six grandchildren.

Moore's primary nicknames were "Gene" and "Geno".

Moore's chief hobby was said to have been dancing.

=== Death ===
Moore died on June 14, 2016, in Maywood, Illinois, of prostate cancer, which he had been fighting for a long time, and which had recently metastasized to his bones. His funeral, held June 17 at Maywood's Second Baptist Church, of which Moore had been a longtime member and had been baptized as a kid, was attended by more than 1,400 mourners.

== Electoral history ==
=== Illinois House of Representatives ===
1992

1992 Illinois House of Representatives 7th district Democratic primary
Party	Candidate	Votes	%
Democratic	Eugene Moore	5,427	36.75
Democratic	Chuck Baxter	3,012	20.39
Democratic	Kristine K. Mackey	2,869	19.43
Democratic	William (Jay Jay) Turner	1,483	10.04
Democratic	LaCoulton Walls	784	5.30
Democratic	Bill Thompson	733	4.96
Democratic	Robert "Bobby" Reid	457	3.09

1992 Illinois House of Representatives 7th district election
Party	Candidate	Votes	%
Democratic	Eugene Moore	28,265	74.96
Republican	Lorenzo S. Littles	5,765	15.29
Harold Washington	Loretta A. Ragsdell	3,670	9.73

1994

1994 Illinois House of Representatives 7th district Democratic primary
Party	Candidate	Votes	%
Democratic	Eugene "Gene" Moore (incumbent)	8,239	85.08
Democratic	Chuck Baxter	1,444	14.91

1994 Illinois House of Representatives 7th district election
Party	Candidate	Votes	%
Democratic	Eugene "Gene" Moore (incumbent)	16,102	79.07
Republican	Joann Tate	4,261	20.92

1996

1996 Illinois House of Representatives 7th district Democratic primary
Party	Candidate	Votes	%
Democratic	Eugene "Gene" Moore (incumbent)	9,324	100

1996 Illinois House of Representatives 18th district election
Party	Candidate	Votes	%
Democratic	Eugene "Gene" Moore (incumbent)	26,498	84.52
Republican	June Edvenson	4,851	15.47

1998

1998 Illinois House of Representatives 7th district Democratic primary
Party	Candidate	Votes	%
Democratic	Eugene Moore (incumbent)	6,087	48.93
Democratic	Karen A. Yarbrough	5,543	44.55
Democratic	Tommie R. Jones	454	3.65
Democratic	Sylvester Hartigan	357	2.87
Total votes		12,441	100

1998 Illinois House of Representatives 18th district election
Party	Candidate	Votes	%
Democratic	Eugene Moore (incumbent)	23,701	100
Total votes		23,701	100

=== Proviso Township Democratic committeeman ===
1998 Proviso Township Democratic committeeman election
Party	Candidate	Votes	%
Democratic	Eugene M. "Gene" Moore	6,883	53.14
Democratic	Gary G. Marinaro (incumbent)	3,935	30.38
Democratic	Chuck Baxter	2,135	16.48

2002 Proviso Township Democratic committeeman election
Party	Candidate	Votes	%
Democratic	Eugene "Gene" Moore (incumbent)	9,073	53.14
Democratic	Karen A. Yarbrough	7,911	41.04
Democratic	Paul "Paulie" Esperaza	2,293	11.90

2006 Proviso Township Democratic committeeman election
Party	Candidate	Votes	%
Democratic	Karen A. Yarbrough	9,746	58.04
Democratic	Eugene "Gene" Moore (incumbent)	7,045	41.96
Total votes		16,791	100

=== Cook County Recorder of Deeds ===
2000

2000 Cook County Recorder of Deeds Democratic primary
Party	Candidate	Votes	%
Democratic	Eugene "Gene" Moore (incumbent)	353,823	100
Total votes		353,823	100

2000 Cook County Recorder of Deeds election
Party	Candidate	Votes	%
Democratic	Eugene "Gene" Moore (incumbent)	1,167,630	73.01
Republican	Arthur D. Sutton	431,717	26.99
Total votes		1,599,347	100

2004

2004 Cook County Recorder of Deeds Democratic primary
Party	Candidate	Votes	%
Democratic	Eugene "Gene" Moore (incumbent)	325,906	100
Total votes		325,906	100

2004 Cook County Recorder of Deeds election
Party	Candidate	Votes	%
Democratic	Eugene "Gene" Moore (incumbent)	1,283,762	70.74
Republican	John H. Cox	530,945	29.26
Total votes		1,814,707	100

2008

2008 Cook County Recorder of Deeds Democratic primary
Party	Candidate	Votes	%
Democratic	Eugene "Gene" Moore (incumbent)	521,162	61.12
Democratic	Ed H. Smith	331,511	38.88
Total votes		852,674	100

2008 Cook County Recorder of Deeds election
Party	Candidate	Votes	%
Democratic	Eugene "Gene" Moore (incumbent)	1,324,426	70.49
Republican	Gregory Goldstein	451,452	24.03
Green	Terrence A. Gilhooly	102,968	5.48
Total votes		1,878,846	100
