= Jesse White Tumbling Team =

Acrobat tumbling team in Illinois, US

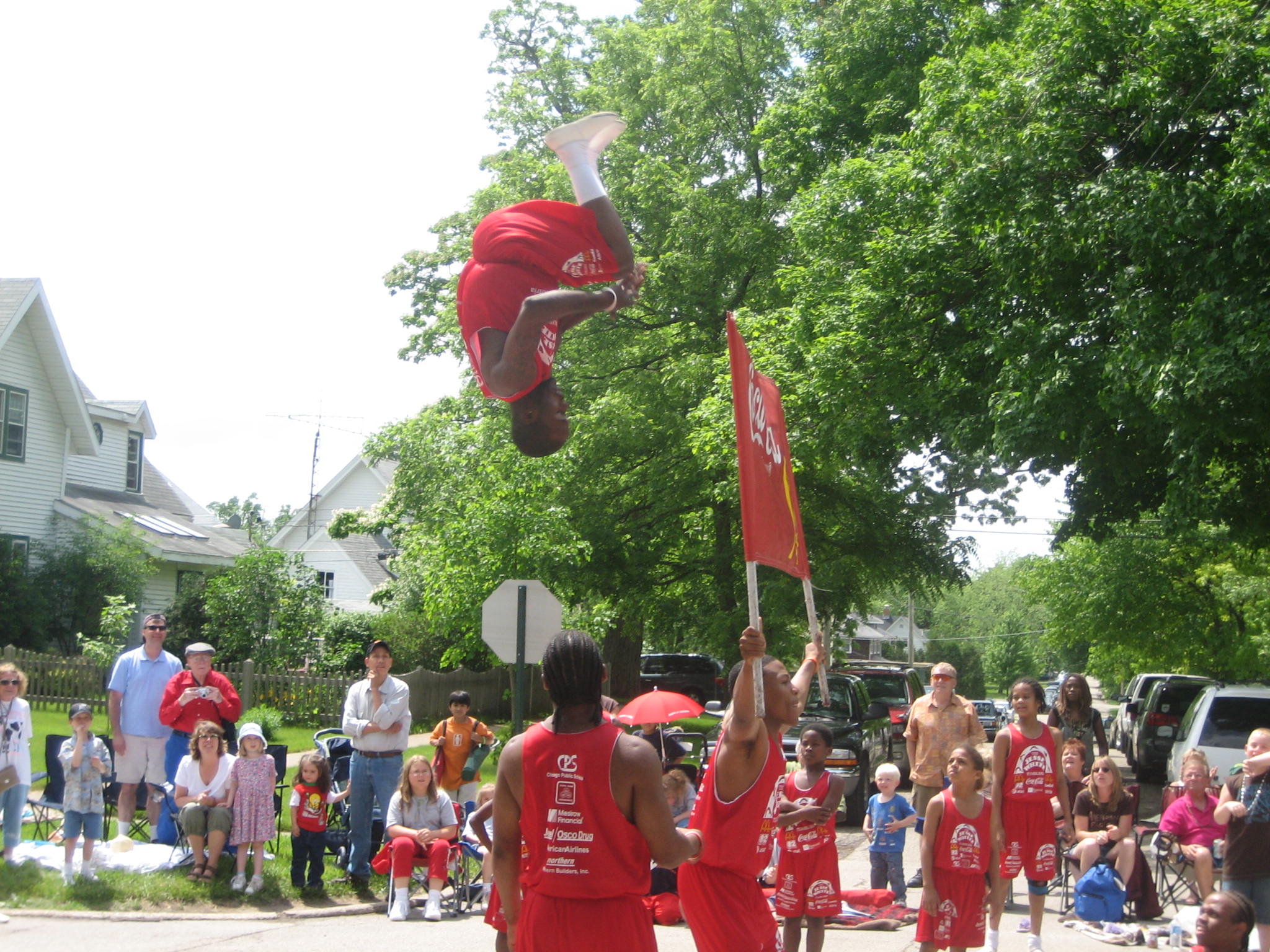
The Jesse White Tumbling Team performing at the 2007 Milk Days parade in Harvard, Illinois.

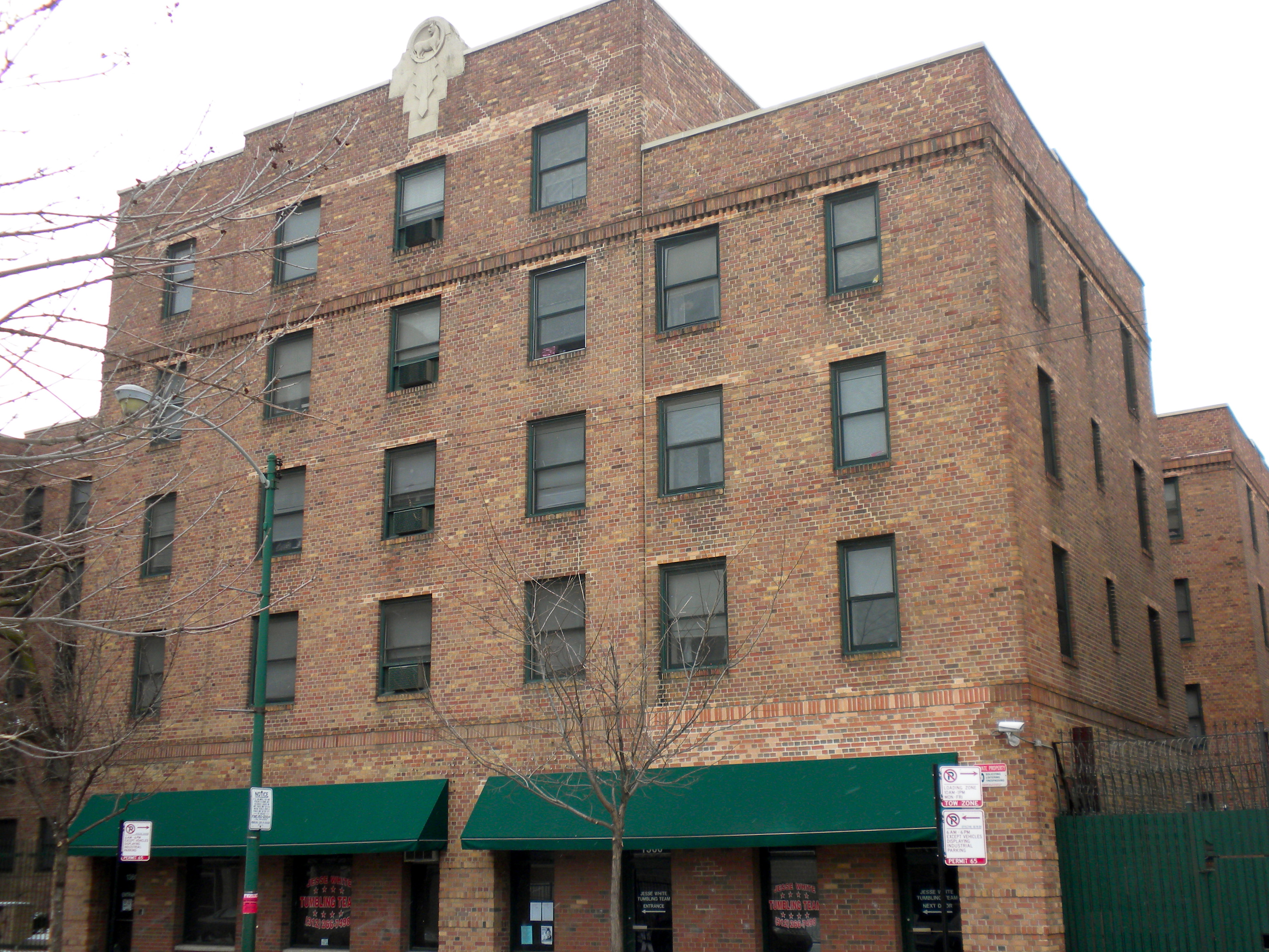
Office of the team at 1360 N. Sedgwick, Chicago

The Jesse White Tumbling Team is a team of acrobats that was founded in 1959 by Illinois athlete and politician Jesse White and Zach Mitchell. Their acrobatic performances, choreographed by Mitchell, can frequently be seen during half-time shows for the National Basketball Association, the National Football League and Major League Baseball games.

White, who still coaches, created the team for children residing in Chicago's inner city housing projects. It serves a juvenile delinquency prevention program. Members are required to abide by White's rules, which include staying in school, maintaining a C average in academic coursework and staying away from gangs and drugs. Since the team's inception, over 10,000 children, ages 6 and up, have participated in the program.

The tumblers have appeared in the movies Heaven is a Playground, Ferris Bueller's Day Off, and The Meteor Man. They have performed at the half time for every NBA team with the exception of the Oklahoma City Thunder and the Charlotte Hornets. They have also appeared in two presidential inaugural parades, for President Bill Clinton and President Barack Obama.

The Jesse White Tumbling Team makes over 1,500 appearances each year, in state and out of state. They have gone to U.S. states as far as Hawaii, and have even made international performances. They have gone to Canada 17 times, Tokyo, Japan to appear on television, China for the Chinese New Year, Bermuda, the Cayman Islands, and Croatia.

The Team celebrated their 50th anniversary at the United Center in February 2010.
