= Ann Stepan =

American politician

Member of the Illinois House of Representatives from the 7th district
- In office 1991–1993
- Preceded by: John Cullerton
- Succeeded by: Eugene Moore

Personal details
- Born: Ann Ruppe; September 27, 1943 Chicago, Illinois
- Died: April 17, 2015 (aged 71) Beverly Shores, Indiana
- Party: Democratic
- Spouse: Paul Stepan (m. 1965; d. 2013)
- Children: 2
- Parent(s): Robert Ruppe (father); Eilleen Bauser (mother)
- Education: Barat College

Ann Stepan (September 27, 1943 – April 17, 2015) was an American politician from Illinois.

Stepan served the 7th district in the Illinois House of Representatives from 1991 to 1993. She married Paul Stepan, a real estate developer, in 1965, shortly after her graduation from Barat College. Stepan died of lymphoma, at her home in Beverly Shores, Indiana on April 17, 2015. Her husband died in 2013.
