= R. Eugene Pincham =

American attorney and jurist (1925–2008)

Judge of the Illinois Appellate Court from the First District
- In office June 11, 1984 – December 29, 1989
- Preceded by: Kenneth Wilson
- Succeeded by: Joseph Gordon

Personal details
- Born: Robert Eugene Pincham; June 28, 1925
- Died: April 3, 2008 (aged 82) Chicago, Illinois
- Party: Democratic Party; Harold Washington Party (1991-1992)
- Spouse: Alzata Henry
- Children: 3
- Education: Tennessee State University (BS); Northwestern University (JD)
- Profession: Judge

Robert Eugene Pincham (June 28, 1925 – April 3, 2008) was an American attorney active in the field of civil rights who served as both a judge of the Circuit Court of Cook County and later a judge of the Appellate Court of Illinois.

== Early life and career ==
R. Eugene Pincham was born June 28, 1925. He was raised in Athens, Alabama. He attended LeMoyne College in Memphis, Tennessee and later earned a Bachelor of Science from Tennessee State University in Nashville, Tennessee. He then earned his J.D. degree at Northwestern University's School of Law. He was admitted to the Illinois State Bar in 1951 and the U.S. Supreme Court Bar in 1965.

== Judicial career ==
He became a Judge of the Cook County Circuit Court in 1976. Howard C. Ryan, the chief justice of the Illinois Supreme Court, appointed Pincham to a vacancy created by the death of Kenneth Wilson. The appointment began June 11, 1984. He won election to the Appellate Court in 1986. In 1989, Pincham resigned to run for President of the Cook County Board of Commissioners in 1990, with an effective resignation date of December 29. Joseph Gordon, a former circuit court judge, was appointed to Pincham's vacancy. Pincham lost the Democratic primary to Richard Phelan.

== Mayoral campaign ==
After then-Cook County Commissioner Danny K. Davis lost the Democratic primary to Richard M. Daley, the mayoral nominee of the Harold Washington Party stepped down to allow party leaders to appoint Pincham as the candidate. Pincham ultimately failed to mobilize African American support in the campaign and lost by a roughly three to one margin.

== Subsequent career ==
In 1992, Pincham left the Harold Washington Party following a dispute over a loan with Republican Party ties, though the leadership denied such a claim. In 1996, Pincham ran for Cook County State's Attorney under the Justice Party ballot line. He placed third, with 9.31% of the vote.

== Death and legacy ==
Pincham died of complications from lung and brain cancer at his home in the Chatham neighborhood. The funeral was held in private at Trinity United Church of Christ, and culminated in remarks by Rev. Jeremiah Wright Jr. A member of the American Civil Liberties Union and a lifetime member of the NAACP, the semi-retired Pincham lectured and instructed in trial and appellate techniques and advocacy. He received numerous awards for his professional and community service and activism. He was also an ardent critic of the U.S. criminal justice system (also see Race Inequalities in the Criminal Justice System). Known for his dramatic oratory which drew on his own personal struggles and those of African Americans, and his tireless advocacy on behalf of those less able to speak for themselves, he was regarded by many in Illinois and particularly the African-American community, as a political and legal icon, and held as a role model by both blacks and whites who came behind him.
