= Joe Birkett =

American politician and attorney

Judge of the Illinois Appellate Court from the 2nd District
- Incumbent
- Assumed office December 2010
- Appointed by: Illinois Supreme Court
- Preceded by: Jack O'Malley

State's Attorney of DuPage County
- In office October 1, 1996 – December 13, 2010
- Preceded by: Anthony Peccarelli
- Succeeded by: Bob Berlin

Personal details
- Born: February 13, 1955 (age 71)
- Education: North Central College (BA); John Marshall Law School (JD)

Joseph E. Birkett (born February 13, 1955) is an appellate court judge on the Illinois Appellate Court – Second District. He was appointed by the Illinois Supreme Court in December 2010, and was subsequently elected to a full term in November 2012. His current term runs through December 2032. Prior to being elevated to the bench, Justice Birkett was the State's Attorney of DuPage County, an office he had held since 1996.

== Biography ==
Birkett is one of 10 children on Chicago's West side. His father died when he was 13. He attended St. Phillip High School, and Aurora Central Catholic High School where he was football team captain and Most Valuable Player. He went on to attend North Central College, where he earned a B.A. in Political Science and English in 1977. He received his Juris Doctor from John Marshall Law School in 1981, where he placed first in the Intramural Moot Court Competition.

He was the Assistant State's Attorney of Dupage County from 1981 to 1985, Chief of Major Crimes Unit from 1986 to 1988, Deputy Chief of Criminal Division from 1986 to 1991, Chief of Criminal Division from 1991 to 1996, and has served as DuPage County State's Attorney since then. He was first elected in November 1996, then re-elected in 2000 and 2004.

Birkett gained national attention when he prosecuted Marilyn Lemak in 1999 for the murders of her three children. Lemak is currently serving a life sentence.

He has been married to Patricia Hill since July 9, 1977, and has two children, Nick and Jackie. He is a resident of Wheaton and attends St. Daniel The Prophet Catholic Church in Wheaton. His brother-in-law is George Wendt, who is married to Birkett's sister Bernadette.

=== 2002 run for Attorney General ===
In 2002, Birkett ran for Illinois Attorney General against Democrat Lisa Madigan. Madigan defeated Birkett in the November 7, 2002 General Election with 50% of the vote to Birkett's 47%.

=== 2006 run for lieutenant governor ===
Judy Baar Topinka named Birkett as her running mate on December 9, 2005. On March 21, 2006, he defeated Steve Rauschenberger, Sandy Wegman, and Lawrence Bruckner in the Republican Party's primary. Topinka also won her primary race. In the November 7, 2006 General Election, Democrats Rod Blagojevich and Pat Quinn defeated Topinka and Birkett, as well as the Green Party's Rich Whitney and Julie Samuels.

=== Appellate Court Judge ===
On November 2, 2010, the Illinois Supreme Court appointed Joe Birkett to serve as Appellate Court Judge on the Second District Appellate Court, replacing Justice Jack O'Malley, who retired. He was sworn in on December 13, 2010.

== Controversy ==
=== Rolando Cruz case ===
In 2002 Birkett's role in the wrongful prosecution of Rolando Cruz, subsequently exonerated by DNA evidence in the murder of 10-year-old Jeanine Nicarico, was partly responsible for his loss to Democrat Lisa Madigan in the race for Illinois attorney general. During his office's prosecution of Rolando Cruz, the lead detective in the case resigned in protest that prosecutors were proceeding against innocent men. https://wwws.law.northwestern.edu/legalclinic/wrongfulconvictions/exonerations/il/alejandro-hernandez.html Yet, DuPage County prosecutors persisted in their prosecution. After four years of arduous litigation, the Illinois Supreme Court reversed Cruz's conviction in 1994, and granted him a third trial. Prior to that trial, newly available DNA testing excluded Cruz as the perpetrator, instead linking another man to the crime. Even so, Birkett's office refused to drop the case. Finally, during the trial, a police officer admitted that he had lied under oath in relation to testimony about Cruz's purported statement that lead to the charges. After hearing all of the prosecution's evidence, the trial judge directed a verdict of not guilty.https://wwws.law.northwestern.edu/legalclinic/wrongfulconvictions/exonerations/il/alejandro-hernandez.html

=== 2007–08 Prosecution of Iraq War protesters ===
On July 18, 2007, The Naperville Sun published an editorial calling the state's attorney's disorderly conduct charges against two war protestors "heavy-handed". The editorial opined:

It is hard to believe that the criminal charges against Sarah M. Hartfield, 45, of Naperville and Jeff Zurawski, 39, of Downers Grove are not at least to some extent politically inspired in nature...We also suspect that had the banner read "Support Bush and Cheney" instead of "Impeach Bush and Cheney – LIARS" the situation would have been viewed a little differently.

Supporters of the defendants staged three rallies at the DuPage County courthouse. The charges were dropped when the chief witness failed to appear in court. Jeff Zurawski called the prosecution "vindictive" and requested a public apology.

Party political offices
Preceded by Jim Ryan	Republican nominee for Attorney General of Illinois; 2002	Succeeded by Stewart Umholtz
Preceded by Carl Hawkinson	Republican nominee for Lieutenant Governor of Illinois; 2006	Succeeded by Jason Plummer
