= Cook County Recorder of Deeds =

Former position of county recorder of deeds of Cook County, Illinois

- Term length: 4 years (second incarnation)
- Inaugural holder: R. J. Hamilton (1st incarnation); James Stewart (2nd incarnation)
- Formation: 1831 (first incarnation); 1872 (second incarnation)
- Final holder: Ed S. Kimberly (first incarnation); Edward Moody (2nd incarnation)
- Abolished: 1848 (first incarnation); December 7, 2020 (second incarnation)

The Cook County Recorder of Deeds was the recorder of deeds of county government in Cook County, Illinois, prior to the position's abolishment in 2020.

== History of office ==
An early incarnation of a dedicated county recorder of deeds was established with the creation of Cook County in 1831. In 1848, it was eliminated, being merged into the position of clerk of the Circuit Court of Cook County (which was renamed "clerk and recorder"). For decades thereafter, the clerk of the Circuit Court served as the ex-officio county recorder of deeds.

An independent position of Cook County recorder of deeds was re-created in December 1872.

On November 8, 2016, Cook County voters approved a binding referendum to eliminate the office, merging its functions into the purview of the Cook County Clerk. The office formally ceased to exist on December 7, 2020.

== Officeholders ==
=== 1831–1848 ===
Recorder of Deeds	Term in office	Party	Notes	Cite
R. J. Hamilton	1831–1839	Democratic		
Eli R. Williams	1839–1843			
William A. Eagan	1843–1847			
Ed S. Kimberly	1847–1848			

=== 1872–2020 ===
Recorder of Deeds	Term in office	Party	Notes	Cite
James Stewart	1872–1876			
James W. Brockway	1876–1884	Republican		
Wiley Scribner	1884–1889	Republican		
Abel Davis	1904–1912	Republican	Elected in 1904 and 1908	
Joseph F. Connery	1912–	Democratic		
Joseph F. Haas				
Salomea Jaranowski				
Clayton F. Smith				
Edward J. Kaindl		Democratic		
Victor L. Schlaeger				
Joseph T. Baran				
Joseph F. Ropa				
Edmund J. Kucharski	1956–1960	Republican	Elected in 1956; lost reelection in 1960	
Sid Olsen	December 1976–December 1984	Democratic	Elected in 1976 and 1980	
Harry Yourell	December 1984–December 1, 1988	Democratic	Elected in 1984	
Carol Moseley Braun	December 1, 1988 – December 1, 1992	Democratic	Elected in 1988	
Jesse White	December 1, 1992 – January 11, 1999	Democratic	Elected in 1992 and 1996; resigned in January 1999 to serve as Illinois Secretary of State	
Eugene Moore	January 1999–December 2012	Democratic	Appointed in January 1999; elected in 2000, 2004, 2008	
Karen Yarbrough	December 2012–December 3, 2018	Democratic	Elected in 2012 and 2016	
Edward Moody	December 4, 2018 – December 7, 2020	Democratic	Appointed in December 2018	

== Recent election results ==
Cook County Recorder of Deeds general elections
Year	Winning candidate	Party	Vote (pct)	Opponent	Party	Vote (pct)	Opponent	Party	Vote (pct)	Opponent	Party	Vote (pct)
1984	Harry "Bus" Yourell	Democratic	1,232,485 (60.94%)	Deborah L. Murphy	Republican	789,906 (39.06%)						
1988	Carol Moseley Braun	Democratic	1,020,805 (54.32%)	Bernard L. Stone	Republican	795,540 (42.33%)	Edward M. Wojkowski	Illinois Solidarity	62,968 (3.35%)			
1992	Jesse White	Democratic	1,121,865 (58.07%)	Susan Catania	Republican	809,963 (41.93%)						
1996	Jesse White	Democratic	1,061,436 (65.33%)	Patrick A. Dwyer	Republican	499,551 (30.75%)	Brenda Hernandez Frias	Harold Washington Party	53,421 (3.29%)	Smith Wiiams	Justice Party	10,251 (0.63%)
2000	Eugene "Gene" Moore	Democratic	1,167,630 (73.01%)	Arthur D. Sutton	Republican	431,717 (26.99%)						
2004	Eugene "Gene" Moore	Democratic	1,283,762 (70.74%)	John H. Cox	Republican	530,945 (29.26%)						
2008	Eugene "Gene" Moore	Democratic	1,324,426 (70.49%)	Gregory Goldstein	Republican	451,452 (24.03%)	Terrence A. Gilhooly	Green	102,968 (5.48%)			
2012	Karen Yarbrough	Democratic	1,313,967 (73.82%)	Sherri Griffith	Republican	466,038 (26.18%)						
2016	Karen Yarbrough	Democratic	1,647,174 (98.58%)	Others	Write-ins	7,250 (0.81%)						
