= 1996 Cook County, Illinois, elections =

- November 5, 1996
- Turnout: 64.37%

The Cook County, Illinois, general election was held on November 5, 1996.

Primaries were held March 19, 1996.

Elections were held for Clerk of the Circuit Court, Recorder of Deeds, State's Attorney, three seats on the Water Reclamation District Board, and judgeships on the Circuit Court of Cook County.

== Election information ==
1996 was a presidential election year in the United States. The primaries and general elections for Cook County races coincided with those for federal races (President, House, and Senate) and those for state elections.

=== Voter turnout ===
==== Primary election ====
Turnout in the primaries was 30.39%, with 776,069 ballots cast. Chicago saw 35.02% turnout and suburban Cook County saw 25.46% turnout.

Vote totals of primaries
| Primary | Chicago vote totals | Suburban Cook County vote totals | Total Cook County vote totals |
|---|---|---|---|
| Democratic | 420,288 | 144,103 | 564,391 |
| Republican | 39,967 | 159,378 | 199,345 |
| Harold Washington Party | 426 | 72 | 498 |
| Harold Washington Party/Democratic | 5,108 | 559 | 5,667 |
| Harold Washington Party/Republican | 224 | 44 | 268 |
| Libertarian | 267 | 318 | 585 |
| Nonpartisan | 17 | 5,298 | 5,315 |
| Total | 466,297 | 309,772 | 776,069 |

==== General election ====
The general election saw turnout of 64.37%, with 1,774,961 ballots cast. Chicago saw 63.17% turnout (with 902,514 ballots cast), and suburban Cook County saw 65.66% turnout (with 872,447 ballots cast).

=== Straight-ticket voting ===
Ballots had a straight-ticket voting option in 1996. This would be the last Cook County election with straight-ticket voting, as it would be abolished in Illinois in 1997.

| Party | Number of straight-ticket votes |
|---|---|
| Democratic | 511,115 |
| Republican | 204,349 |
| Harold Washington | 2,062 |
| Libertarian | 1,992 |
| Reform | 8,881 |
| U.S. Taxpayers' | 234 |
| Justice | 952 |

== Clerk of the Circuit Court ==
1996 Clerk of the Circuit Court of Cook County election
- November 5, 1996
- Turnout: 59.55%
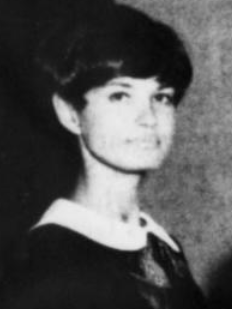

| Candidate | Aurelia Pucinski | Sandra M. Stavropoulos |
| Party | Democratic | Republican |
| Popular vote | 1,149,216 | 397,191 |
| Percentage | 70.37% | 24.32% |
Clerk before election
Aurelia Pucinski
Democratic
Elected Clerk
Aurelia Pucinski
Democratic

In the 1996 Clerk of the Circuit Court of Cook County election, incumbent second-term clerk Aurelia Pucinski, a Democrat, was reelected.

=== Primaries ===
==== Democratic ====
Clerk of the Circuit Court of Cook County Democratic primary
| Party | Candidate | Votes | % |
|---|---|---|---|
| Democratic | Aurelia Marie Pucinski (incumbent) | 374,508 | 100 |
| Total votes | | 374,508 | 100 |

==== Republican ====
Clerk of the Circuit Court of Cook County Republican primary
| Party | Candidate | Votes | % |
|---|---|---|---|
| Republican | Sandra M. Stavropoulos | 114,082 | 100 |
| Total votes | | 114,082 | 100 |

=== General election ===
Clerk of the Circuit Court of Cook County election
| Party | Candidate | Votes | % |
|---|---|---|---|
| Democratic | Aurelia Marie Pucinski | 1,149,216 | 70.37 |
| Republican | Sandra M. Stavropoulos | 397,191 | 24.32 |
| Harold Washington | Philip Morris | 64,204 | 3.03 |
| Justice Party | Janet Dennis | 22,581 | 1.38 |
| Total votes | | 1,642,109 | 100 |

== Recorder of Deeds ==
1996 Cook County Recorder of Deeds election
- November 5, 1996
- Turnout: 58.92%
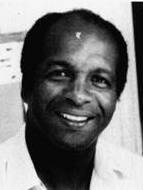

| Candidate | Jesse White | Patrick A. Dwyer |
| Party | Democratic | Republican |
| Popular vote | 1,061,436 | 499,551 |
| Percentage | 65.33% | 30.75% |
Recorder of Deeds before election
Jesse White
Democratic
Elected Recorder of Deeds
Jesse White
Democratic

In the 1996 Cook County Recorder of Deeds election, incumbent first-term recorder of deeds Jesse White, a Democrat, was reelected.

=== Primaries ===
==== Democratic ====
Cook County Recorder of Deeds Democratic primary
| Party | Candidate | Votes | % |
|---|---|---|---|
| Democratic | Jesse White (incumbent) | 286,877 | 70.35 |
| Democratic | Mary Ellen Considine | 120,924 | 29.65 |
| Total votes | | 407,801 | 100 |

==== Republican ====
Cook County Recorder of Deeds Republican primary
| Party | Candidate | Votes | % |
|---|---|---|---|
| Republican | Patrick A. Dwyer | 72,215 | 60.07 |
| Republican | William J. Kelly | 48,000 | 39.93 |
| Total votes | | 120,215 | 100 |

==== Harold Washington Party ====
Cook County Recorder of Deeds Harold Washington Party primary
| Party | Candidate | Votes | % |
|---|---|---|---|
| Harold Washington | Brenda Hernandez Frias | 1,997 | 100 |
| Total votes | | 1,997 | 100 |

=== General election ===
Cook County Recorder of Deeds election
| Party | Candidate | Votes | % |
|---|---|---|---|
| Democratic | Jesse White (incumbent) | 1,061,436 | 65.33 |
| Republican | Patrick A. Dwyer | 499,551 | 30.75 |
| Harold Washington | Brenda Hernandez Frias | 53,421 | 3.29 |
| Justice Party | Smith Wiiams | 10,251 | 0.63 |
| Total votes | | 1,624,659 | 100 |

== State's Attorney ==
1996 Cook County State's Attorney election
- November 5, 1996
- Turnout: 61.95%
| Candidate | Richard A. Devine | Jack O'Malley | R. Eugene Pincham |
| Party | Democratic | Republican | Justice |
| Popular vote | 805,659 | 694,306 | 156,695 |
| Percentage | 47.88% | 41.26% | 9.31% |
State's Attorney before election
Jack O'Malley
Republican
Elected State's Attorney
Richard A. Devine
Democratic

In the 1996 Cook County State's Attorney election, incumbent state's attorney Jack O'Malley, a Republican first elected in a special election in 1990 and subsequently reelected in 1992, was defeated by Democrat Richard A. Devine.

=== Primaries ===
==== Democratic ====
Cook County State’s Attorney Democratic primary
| Party | Candidate | Votes | % |
|---|---|---|---|
| Democratic | Richard A. Devine | 284,781 | 100 |
| Total votes | | 284,781 | 100 |

==== Republican ====
Cook County State’s Attorney Republican primary
| Party | Candidate | Votes | % |
|---|---|---|---|
| Republican | John M. "Jack" O'Malley (incumbent) | 159,505 | 100 |
| Total votes | | 159,505 | 100 |

==== Harold Washington Party ====
Cook County State’s Attorney Harold Washington Party primary
| Party | Candidate | Votes | % |
|---|---|---|---|
| Harold Washington | Lawrence C. Redman, Jr. | 3,475 | 100 |
| Total votes | | 3,475 | 100 |

=== General election ===
Few had seen Devine as having much prospect of unseating O'Malley, a popular incumbent who was regarded as a rising political star. Devine's strong victory over O'Malley was regarded as a very surprising upset.

Devine was regarded as having ridden the coattails of a Democratic wave in Illinois which saw incumbent president Bill Clinton and his vice president Al Gore carry the state by nearly twenty-points in the presidential election and Illinois also elect Dick Durbin in its U.S. Senate election.

Even Devine himself expressed surprise at just how large his margin-of-victory was over O'Malley.

Cook County State’s Attorney election
| Party | Candidate | Votes | % |
|---|---|---|---|
| Democratic | Richard A. Devine | 805,659 | 47.88 |
| Republican | John M. "Jack" O'Malley (incumbent) | 694,306 | 41.26 |
| Justice Party | R. Eugene Pincham | 156,695 | 9.31 |
| Harold Washington | Lawrence C. Redman, Jr. | 26,131 | 1.55 |
| Total votes | | 1,708,256 | 100 |

== Water Reclamation District Board ==
1996 Metropolitan Water Reclamation District of Greater Chicago election
- November 5, 1996

3 of 9 seats on the Metropolitan Water Reclamation District of Greater Chicago
| | First party | Second party |
|---|---|---|
| Party | Democratic | Republican |

In the 1996 Metropolitan Water Reclamation District of Greater Chicago election, three of the nine seats on the Metropolitan Water Reclamation District of Greater Chicago board were up for election in an at-large election. All three Democratic nominees won election.

== Judicial elections ==
Pasrtisan elections were held for judgeships on the Circuit Court of Cook County due to vacancies. Retention elections were also held for the Circuit Court.

Partisan elections were also held for subcircuit courts judgeships due to vacancies. Retention elections were held for other judgeships.

== Other elections ==
Coinciding with the primaries, elections were held to elect both the Democratic, Republican, and Harold Washington Party committeemen for the wards of Chicago.

== See also ==
- 1996 Illinois elections
