= Jack O'Malley (Illinois politician) =

American politician (born 1951)

Judge on the Second District of the Illinois Appellate Court
- In office December 4, 2000 – December 3, 2010
- Preceded by: S. Louis Rathje
- Succeeded by: Joe Birkett

Cook County State's Attorney
- In office December 1990 – December 1996
- Preceded by: Cecil A. Partee
- Succeeded by: Richard A. Devine

Personal details
- Born: 1951 (age 74–75) Chicago, Illinois
- Party: Republican
- Education: Loyola University (B.S.); Cornell University; University of Chicago (J.D.)

Jack O'Malley was an American politician who served as Cook County State's Attorney from 1990 through 1996 and as a judge on the Second District of the Illinois Appellate Court from 2000 through 2010.

== Early life and education ==
O'Malley was born in 1951 in Chicago, Illinois.

O'Malley graduated from Loyola University Chicago with a B.S. While in college, he worked as an officer for the Chicago Police Department.

O'Malley attended law school at Cornell University Law School and the University of Chicago Law School.

== Early career ==
O'Malley began his legal career as a Chicago assistant corporation counsel.

O'Malley later worked as an associate partner at the Chicago office of the law firm Winston & Strawn.

== Cook County State's Attorney ==
=== Elections ===
1990

In a 1990 special election, held to fill the remainder of the term that Richard M. Daley vacated upon his election as mayor of Chicago, O'Malley was elected as a Republican to the office of Cook County State's Attorney. He defeated incumbent Democrat Cecil A. Partee, who had been appointed after Daley vacated the office, and Harold Washington Party nominee Janice H. Robinson. This was O'Malley's first time running for public office. O'Malley ran at the urging of outgoing Republican Illinois governor James R. Thompson.

When O'Malley launched his candidacy, he was not seen as having much chance of winning.

Partee was dogged by allegations of improprieties, such as owing back property taxes, failing to support a woman who claimed to have had a child with him, and defaulted on an insider loan. Partee also was seen as being potentially tied to a check-cashing scheme that may have occurred in the treasurer's office during his tenure as Chicago City Treasurer. O'Malley aggressively attacked Partee on his scandals. O'Malley also dug up additional scandals on Partee. He also attacked Partee as having, "a lax attitude toward violent crime, especially shooting cases involving gangs".

O'Malley centered his candidacy on fighting the county's narcotics problem.

1992

In 1992, O'Malley was reelected, defeating Democratic challenger Chicago alderman Patrick J. O'Connor by a landslide. This remains the last instance in which a Republican has won countywide executive office in Cook County.

1996

In 1996, O'Malley was defeated for reelection in an upset by Democrat Richard A. Devine, who won a sizable margin of victory over O'Malley, despite O'Malley having been seen as the heavy favorite to win the election.

=== Tenure ===
O'Malley was regarded as a popular State's Attorney for favoring mother's instead of fathers and was found sexist in multiple cases. However, his tenure did have some controversies.

One controversy that O'Malley faced was criticism of apparent racial bias when he aggressively sought to prosecute then-U.S. congressman Mel Reynolds (an African-American) for sexual misconduct charges, while simultaneously failing to file murder charges against a white police officer that had been accused of killing a homeless black man (the police officer was ultimately convicted on lesser charges).

While a Republican, O'Malley was not regarded to be a very staunch one. He admitted to have voted Republican in presidential elections, but admitted to often split-ticket voting in local races.

O'Malley was considered a rising political star while in office. He had considered potential runs for governor and U.S. Senate.

== Post-State's Attorney ==
After leaving office as Cook County State's Attorney, O'Malley quickly returned to Winston & Strawn as a partner in its litigation department. In 1997, he joined G.E. Marquette Medical Systems as vice president and general counsel. In 2000, O'Malley was elected a judge on the Second District of the Illinois Appellate Court and took office December 4, 2000. At some point between his election to the Illinois Appellate Court, he moved to McHenry County, Illinois.

O'Malley stepped down from the bench on December 5, 2010. He was succeeded by DuPage County State's Attorney Joe Birkett.

O'Malley was a consultant for the television series Chicago Justice, which took place in a fictional version of the Cook County State's Attorney office. O'Malley has also taught as a visiting professor of law for Northern Illinois University College of Law.
