= Jesse White (politician) =

American politician

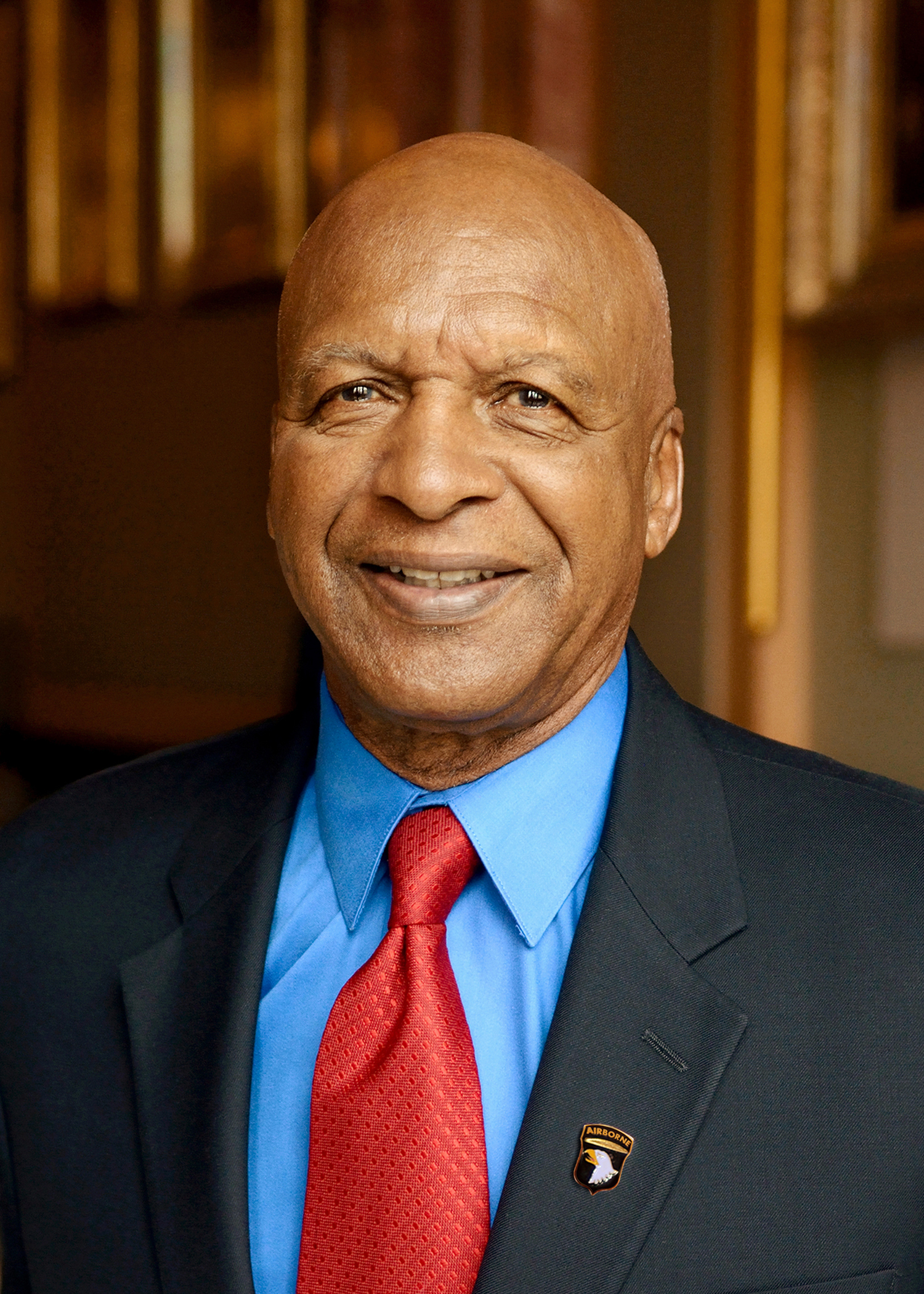
- White in 2015

37th Secretary of State of Illinois
- In office January 11, 1999 – January 9, 2023
- Governor: George Ryan; Rod Blagojevich; Pat Quinn; Bruce Rauner; JB Pritzker
- Preceded by: George Ryan
- Succeeded by: Alexi Giannoulias

Cook County Recorder of Deeds
- In office December 1, 1992 – January 11, 1999
- Preceded by: Carol Moseley Braun
- Succeeded by: Eugene Moore

Member of the Illinois House of Representatives
- In office January 8, 1979 – December 1, 1992
- Preceded by: James Houlihan
- Succeeded by: Robert LeFlore
- Constituency: 8th district (1983–1992); 13th district (1979–1983)
- In office January 8, 1975 – January 12, 1977
- Preceded by: Robert L. Thompson
- Succeeded by: Daniel P. O'Brien/ Elroy C. Sandquist Jr.
- Constituency: 13th district

Personal details
- Born: Jesse Clark White; June 23, 1934 (age 92) Alton, Illinois, U.S.
- Party: Democratic
- Children: 1
- Education: Alabama State University (BA)

Military service
- Allegiance: United States
- Branch/service: United States Army
- Years of service: 1957–1959
- Unit: 101st Airborne Division • Illinois National Guard

Jesse Clark White (born June 23, 1934) is an American educator, politician, and former athlete from the state of Illinois. A member of the Democratic Party, he served as the 37th secretary of state of Illinois from 1999 to 2023. He was the longest-serving person to hold this office. A popular office holder, White declined to seek reelection in 2022 for a seventh term. Previously, he served as the Cook County Recorder of Deeds from 1993 to 1999 and in the Illinois House of Representatives from 1975 to 1993.

Raised in Chicago, White attended Alabama State University on a sports scholarship. He was a minor league baseball player in the 1950s and 1960s. During that time, he also formed a youth sports and community organization, the Jesse White Tumbling Team, which has continued throughout his several careers. White went on to become a teacher and administrator in the Chicago Public Schools.

== Biography ==
White was born in Alton, Illinois. He attended Alabama State University (then called Alabama State College), where he played baseball and basketball, and he graduated with a bachelor's degree in 1957. While there, he got to know then local minister, Martin Luther King Jr. He served in the 101st Airborne Division of the United States Army from 1957 to 1959. In May 1995, White was inducted into the Southwestern Athletic Conference Hall of Fame. He was an all-city baseball and basketball player at Chicago's Waller High School (now Lincoln Park High School) and was inducted into the Chicago Public League Basketball Coaches Association Hall of Fame in June 1995. In 1999, he was inducted into the Alabama State University Sports Hall of Fame.

In 1959, White founded the Jesse White Tumbling Team to serve as a positive alternative for children residing in the Chicago area. Since its inception, more than 18,500 young men and women have performed with the team.

White served as a paratrooper in the United States Army’s 101st Airborne Division and as a member of the Illinois National Guard. He played minor league professional baseball with the Chicago Cubs organization. In the 1960s, a Cubs official told him he was on a shortlist to be brought up to the majors, but was dropped when he was seen at a restaurant with a white woman (who, it turns out, was interviewing him as a reporter). The Cubs honored him in 2021 by giving him a one day majors contract, making him a "Cub for life." Also in the 1960s, White began a 33-year career with the Chicago Public Schools as a teacher and administrator.

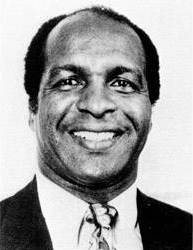
White, circa 1981

White became a political protégé of longtime Cook County Board President and 42nd Ward Democratic Committeeman George Dunne. White was elected to the Illinois General Assembly in 1974 and served for 16 years. He was elected Cook County Recorder of Deeds in 1992 and re-elected in 1996. White was elected Secretary of State of Illinois in 1998, and was re-elected in 2002, 2006, 2010, 2014, and 2018. In recent years he has also served as Democratic Committeeman of Chicago's 27th Ward.

=== As Secretary of State ===
First elected to Secretary of State of Illinois in 1998, White was re-elected in 2002 by winning all 102 counties and garnering more than 2.3 million votes, the largest vote total by any candidate for Illinois statewide office in a quarter of a century. In 2006, White was re-elected to a third term, having received 63 percent of the vote statewide. White was elected to a fourth term in 2010, the leading vote-getter in the entire state.

White has been an advocate on traffic safety issues. In 2007, he initiated teen driver safety legislation giving Illinois one of the top-ranked graduated driver licensing (GDL) programs in the country. In the first full year of the new law, teen fatal crashes in Illinois dropped by over 40 percent.

White has also worked to crack down on DUI. He partnered with Mothers Against Drunk Driving (MADD) on key DUI legislation. Effective January 1, 2009, the new law requires all first-time DUI offenders who wish to obtain driving relief to install a breath alcohol ignition interlock device (BAIID) on their vehicles. MADD called this one of the most important pieces of DUI legislation passed in Illinois in several years.

While in office White worked to improve truck safety and the CDL licensing process. In his first year in office, White initiated a comprehensive highway safety package to tighten up the rules and regulations of the CDL licensing process. Most recently, White implemented a key policy change beginning May 1, 2008 in which out-of-state Commercial driver's license holders moving to Illinois must take and pass the written and road tests before they are issued an Illinois CDL. Illinois was the first state in the nation to require these tests for licensed CDL holders moving from another state. The policy change has received praise from law enforcement and trucking industry representatives.

White improved customer services through streamlined operations and the innovative use of technology. This resulted in shorter than ever wait times at driver licensing facilities as more customers take advantage of new, technology-based transactions that the office has developed to better serve the public. In 2006, Internet transactions accounted for over $41 million. In 2008, these transactions accounted for over $73 million.

White continues to be an advocate for organ and tissue donation. He initiated legislation creating the First Person Consent Organ/Tissue Donor Registry, which makes a person's decision to donate legally binding. Since 2006, more than 5 million people have signed up for the registry.

In 1999, White inherited an office under a cloud of corruption from George H. Ryan. White immediately pledged to restore integrity and eliminate all forms of institutionalized corruption and wrongdoing. Some key efforts included: establishing a code of conduct for employees; setting strict fundraising policies that prohibit employee contributions; hiring Jim Burns, former U.S. Attorney for the Northern District of Illinois, as Inspector General and strengthened the Inspector General's office; and initiated legislation to make the position of Inspector General permanent with broad powers to root out corruption.

The Secretary of State's office administers library grants throughout the state. In 2010, White re-directed federal funds from the Illinois State Library so that local libraries throughout Illinois could maintain a revenue flow from the state despite the state's fiscal crisis.

=== Senate appointment of Roland Burris ===
In January 2009, White gained national attention for his decision to not certify Roland Burris's nomination to the United States Senate following corruption charges against former Illinois Governor Rod Blagojevich. White steadfastly refused to co-sign a certificate of appointment for any appointee named by the governor, Blagojevich, who was arrested in part for trying to sell this very same senate seat. Burris then filed for mandamus in the Illinois Supreme Court to compel White to certify the appointment as part of his routine administrative duties.

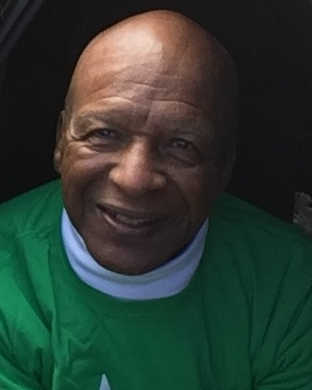
White in 2018

On January 9, the Supreme Court ruled that White did not have to sign his name to any appointment made by Governor Rod Blagojevich. The Court further ruled that White had fulfilled his legal obligations regarding the appointment of Burris to the U.S. Senate by registering the appointment in accordance with state law. The document registered did not include White's signature or the State Seal. On January 12, the U.S. Senate officially seated Burris as Illinois’ junior senator.

== Election history ==
Illinois Secretary of State election, 2018
Party	Candidate	Votes	%
Democratic	Jesse White (incumbent)	3,120,207	68.3
Republican	Jason Helland	1,336,079	29.2
Libertarian	Steve Dutner	114,556	2.5
Democratic hold			

Illinois Secretary of State election, 2014
Party	Candidate	Votes	%
Democratic	Jesse White (incumbent)	2,374,849	65.7
Republican	Michael Webster	1,134,452	31.4
Libertarian	Christopher Michel	104,498	2.9
Democratic hold			

Illinois Secretary of State election, 2010
Party	Candidate	Votes	%
Democratic	Jesse White (incumbent)	2,590,222	69.9
Republican	Robert Enriquez	1,001,544	27.0
Libertarian	Josh Hanson	115,458	3.1
Democratic hold			

Illinois Secretary of State election, 2006
Party	Candidate	Votes	%
Democratic	Jesse White (incumbent)	2,204,762	62.8
Republican	Dan Rutherford	1,159,363	33.0
Green	Karen "Young" Peterson	115,458	3.2
Democratic hold			

Illinois Secretary of State election, 2002
Party	Candidate	Votes	%
Democratic	Jesse White (incumbent)	2,390,181	67.9
Republican	Kristine O'Rourke Cohn	1,051,672	29.9
Libertarian	Matt Beauchamp	115,458	3.2
Democratic hold			

Illinois Secretary of State election, 1998
Party	Candidate	Votes	%
Democratic	Jesse White	1,874,626	55.5
Republican	Al Salvi	1,437,420	42.5
Reform	Sandra Millatti	67,696	2.0
Democratic gain from Republican			

Illinois Secretary of State Democratic primary election, 1998
Party	Candidate	Votes	%
Democratic	Jesse White	484,798	55.8
Democratic	Tim McCarthy	384,603	44.2
Total votes		869,401	100

== Awards and honors ==
In 1999, White was inducted into the Chicago Gay and Lesbian Hall of Fame as a Friend of the Community. In 2015, he received the Jane Addams Award for Distinction in Social Service from the Chicago History Museum. He was named by the governor of Illinois as a 2026 recipient of the Order of Lincoln, an award which recognizes "remarkable contributions to the betterment of humanity in or on behalf of the State of Illinois."

Party political offices
Preceded by Pat Quinn	Democratic nominee for Secretary of State of Illinois; 1998, 2002, 2006, 2010, 2014, 2018	Succeeded by Alexi Giannoulias
Political offices
Preceded by George Ryan	Secretary of State of Illinois; 1999–2023	Succeeded by Alexi Giannoulias
