= Richard A. Devine =

American lawyer (born 1943)

Richard Devine

Cook County State's Attorney
- In office December 1, 1996 – December 1, 2008
- Preceded by: Jack O'Malley
- Succeeded by: Anita Alvarez

President of the Chicago Park District Board of Commissioners
- In office 1990–1993

Personal details
- Born: July 5, 1943 (age 82) Chicago, Illinois
- Party: Democratic
- Education: Loyola University Chicago (BA); Northwestern University (JD)

Richard A. Devine (born July 5, 1943) is an American attorney who served as the Cook County State's Attorney from 1996 to 2008.

== Early life and education ==
The second of five children, he was the son of a Chicago Water Department employee. Devine grew up in Rogers Park, Chicago, and played football and basketball at Loyola Academy in Wilmette, Illinois. He attended John Carroll University for one year on a football scholarship but returned home when his father's health worsened after a stroke. In 1966, Devine graduated from Loyola University Chicago with a Bachelor of Arts degree before earning a Juris Doctor from the Northwestern University Pritzker School of Law in 1968.

== Career ==
Devine worked as an aide to Chicago mayor Richard J. Daley in 1968 and 1969. Devine worked then as a legal advisor to Daley from 1969 to 1972. He then served as the first assistant state's attorney's office under Richard M. Daley from 1980 to 1983. He was President of the Chicago Park District from 1990 to 1993, and a member of the court-reform commission created in the wake of the Operation Greylord.

Devine was elected in 1996 as the Cook County State's Attorney, unseating incumbent Republican Jack O'Malley in an upset victory. He served for 12 years until 2008, when he did not seek re-election. He was succeeded by Anita Alvarez.

Devine appeared in Surviving R. Kelly, a 2019 Lifetime documentary series about sexual abuse allegations against musician R. Kelly. Though the 2008 trial of Kelly occurred at the end of Devine's tenure, he did not participate in the trial.

== Personal life ==
Devine has been married to Charlene Devine for over 50 years and they have four adult children.

Preceded by Jack O'Malley	Cook County, Illinois State's Attorney; 1996–2008	Succeeded by Anita Alvarez
