= Osoje =

Osoje may refer to:

- Osojë, Albania, a village in Albania
- Osojë, Kosovo, a village near Peja (Peć)
- Osoje, Vareš, a village in Bosnia and Herzegovina
- Osoje, Posušje, a village in Bosnia and Herzegovina
- Osoje, Tuzla, a village in Bosnia and Herzegovina
- Osoje, Croatia, a village in Dicmo
- Osoje (Novi Pazar), a village in Serbia
- Osoje (Prijepolje), a village in Serbia

== See also ==
- Podosoje (disambiguation)
