= Prisoje =

Prisoje may refer to:

- Prisoje, Bileća, a village in Bosnia and Herzegovina
- Prisoje, Foča, a village in Bosnia and Herzegovina
- Prisoje, Goražde, a village in Bosnia and Herzegovina
- Prisoje, Jezero, a village in Bosnia and Herzegovina
- Prisoje, Tomislavgrad, a village in Bosnia and Herzegovina
- Prisoje, Višegrad, a village in Bosnia and Herzegovina
- Prisoje, Croatia, a village in Dicmo
- Prisoje, a hamlet in the village of Milošev Do, Serbia
