= Podosoje =

Podosoje may refer to several places:

In Croatia

- Podosoje, Runovići, a village near Runovići
- Podosoje, Vrlika

In Bosnia and Herzegovina

- Podosoje, Bileća
- Podosoje, Kotor Varoš, a village near Kotor Varoš
- Podosoje, Ravno, a village near Ravno
- Podosoje, Srebrenica
- Podosoje, Šipovo, a village near Šipovo
- Podosoje, Trebinje

== See also ==
- Osoje (disambiguation)
