= Osojë =

Osojë may refer to:

- Osojë, Albania, a village in Albania
- Osojë, Kosovo, a village near Peja (Peć)
