= Ercegovci =

- Village
- Interactive map of Ercegovci
- Location within Croatia
- Coordinates: 43°35′42″N 16°38′10″E
- Country: Croatia
- County: Split-Dalmatia County
- Municipality: Dicmo

Area
  - Total: 5.2 km^{2} (2.0 sq mi)
- Elevation: 314 m (1,030 ft)

Population (2021)
  - Total: 121
  - Density: 23/km^{2} (60/sq mi)
- Postal code: 21232
- Area code: +385 (0)21

Ercegovci is a village in the municipality of Dicmo in Croatia. In 2021, it had 121 inhabitants. The settlement's patron saint is Elijah, celebrated on 20 July.

== History ==
The village of Ercegovci was first settled by residents from Herzegovina at the end of the 17th century. Ercegovci belongs to the parish of Krušvar, the village that is on the opposite side of the karst field.

== Demographics ==
Historical population
| Year | Pop. | ±% |
|---|---|---|
| 1857 | 191 | — |
| 1869 | 199 | +4.2% |
| 1880 | 196 | −1.5% |
| 1890 | 230 | +17.3% |
| 1900 | 262 | +13.9% |
| 1910 | 262 | +0.0% |
| 1921 | 295 | +12.6% |
| 1931 | 315 | +6.8% |
| 1948 | 245 | −22.2% |
| 1953 | 280 | +14.3% |
| 1961 | 297 | +6.1% |
| 1971 | 287 | −3.4% |
| 1981 | 208 | −27.5% |
| 1991 | 164 | −21.2% |
| 2001 | 145 | −11.6% |
| 2011 | 143 | −1.4% |
| 2021 | 121 | — |

Ercegovci: Population trends 1857–2021
v

| population | 191 | 199 | 196 | 230 | 262 | 262 | 295 | 315 | 245 | 280 | 297 | 287 | 208 | 164 | 145 | 143 | 121 |
| | 1857 | 1869 | 1880 | 1890 | 1900 | 1910 | 1921 | 1931 | 1948 | 1953 | 1961 | 1971 | 1981 | 1991 | 2001 | 2011 | 2021 |

Sources: Croatian Bureau of Statistics publications
