= Sičane =

Settlement in Split-Dalmatia County, Croatia

- Settlement
- Interactive map of Sičane
- Location within Croatia
- Coordinates: 43°39′30″N 16°34′58″E
- Country: Croatia
- County: Split-Dalmatia
- Municipality: Dicmo

Area
  - Total: 20.0 km^{2} (7.7 sq mi)

Population (2021)
  - Total: 451
  - Density: 22.6/km^{2} (58.4/sq mi)
- Time zone: UTC+1 (CET)
  - Summer (DST): UTC+2 (CEST)
- Postal code: 21232 Dicmo
- Area code: +385 (0)21

Sičane is a settlement in the Municipality of Dicmo in Croatia. In 2021, its population was 451.

== Demographics ==
Sičane: Population trends 1857–2021
v

population	488	490	486	487	508	479	612	568	647	705	793	738	641	531	449	502	451
	1857	1869	1880	1890	1900	1910	1921	1931	1948	1953	1961	1971	1981	1991	2001	2011	2021

Sources: Croatian Bureau of Statistics publications
