= Polk Bros Park =

Park in Chicago, Illinois, U.S.

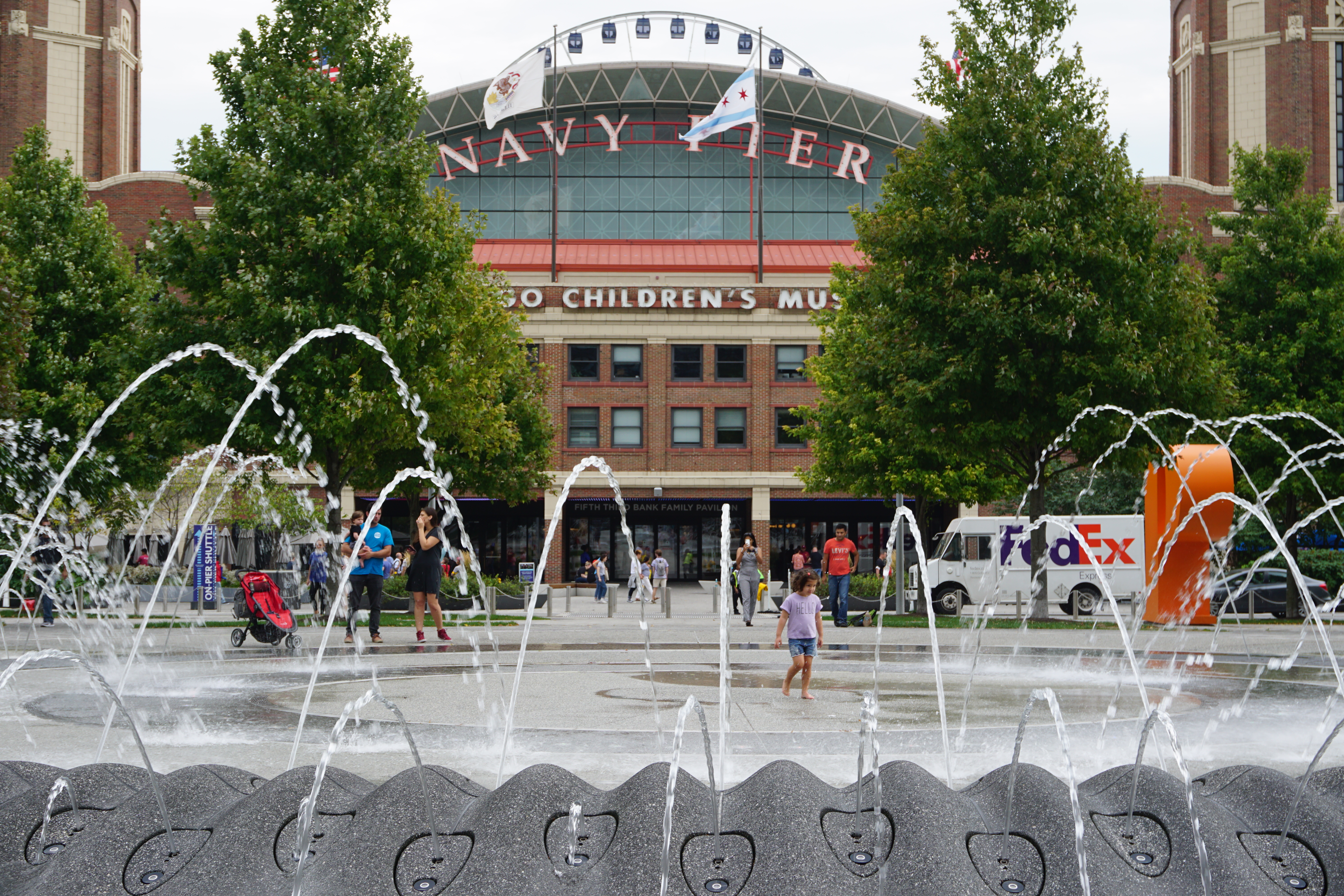
- The fountain in 2019, with Navy Pier in the background
- Interactive map of Polk Bros Park
- Location: Chicago, Illinois, U.S.
- Coordinates: 41°53′29″N 87°36′38″W
- Area: 13 acres (5.3 ha)

Polk Bros Park is a 13-acre (5.3 ha) park at Chicago's Navy Pier. The park features the Peoples Energy Welcome Pavilion, Polk Bros Fountain, and the Polk Bros Performance Lawns, a pair of lawns with stages called City Stage and Lake Stage.

== Description ==
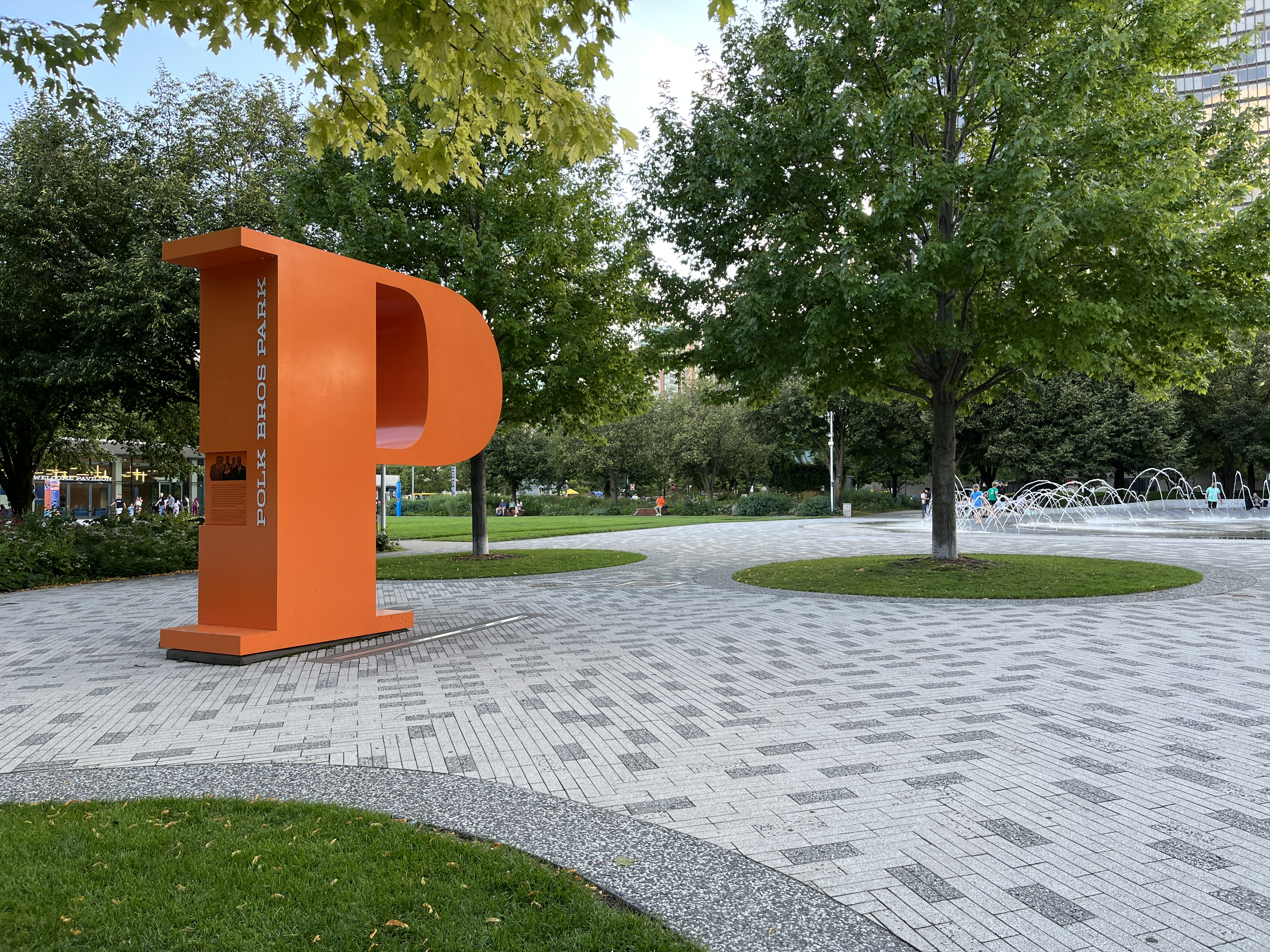
Sign for the park in 2023

Polk Bros Park serves as a "front lawn" to Chicago's Navy Pier. The park is named after the Polk family, who owned a large appliance and electronics store. Features include the Peoples Energy Welcome Pavilion, the Polk Bros Fountain, and the Polk Bros Performance Lawns.

=== Peoples Energy Welcome Pavilion ===
The Peoples Energy Welcome Pavilion is a 4,000-square-foot (370 m^{2}) pavilion with restrooms, seating areas, a 35-foot (11 m) digital screen, LED lighting, and a green roof.

=== Polk Bros Fountain ===
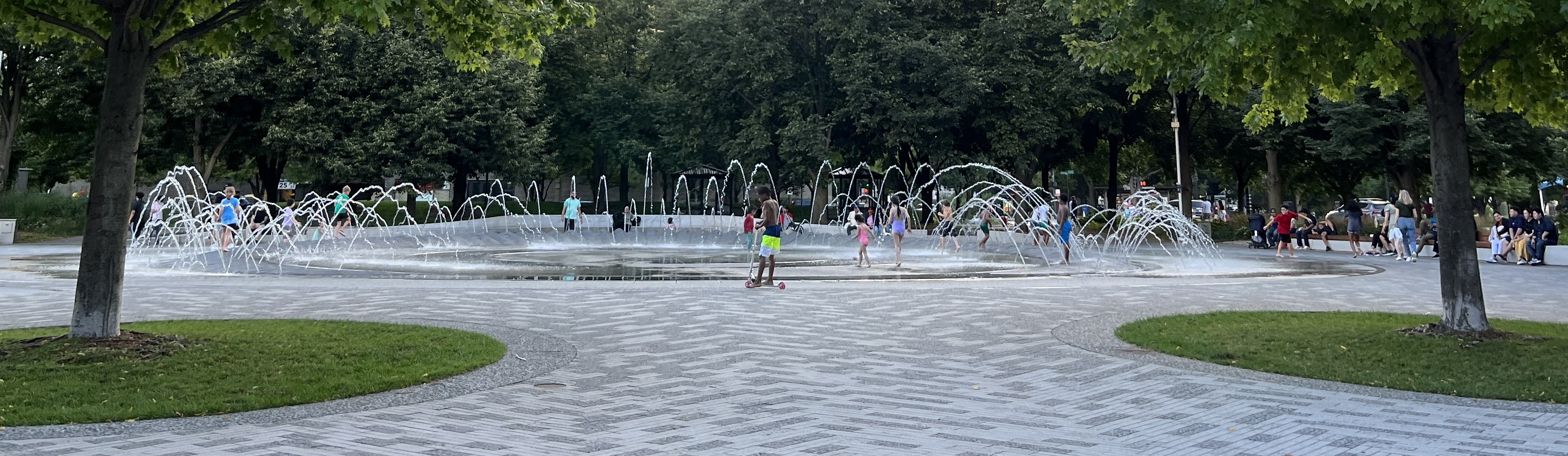
The fountain in 2023

The Polk Bros Fountain was designed by Fluidity Design Consultants. Landscape Architecture Magazine said, "From the outset, this water feature puts Navy Pier's emphasis on engaging and interactive social spaces. It's 100 feet in circumference, outlined by a set of 3-D modeled concrete berms worth scrambling over, with 147 water jets that create parabolic arcs that expand and contract. These concentric arcs are nearly architectural expressions themselves: tunnels that are the perfect size for children to run through in cloaks of mist emitted from the fountain’s center."

=== Polk Brothers Performance Lawns ===
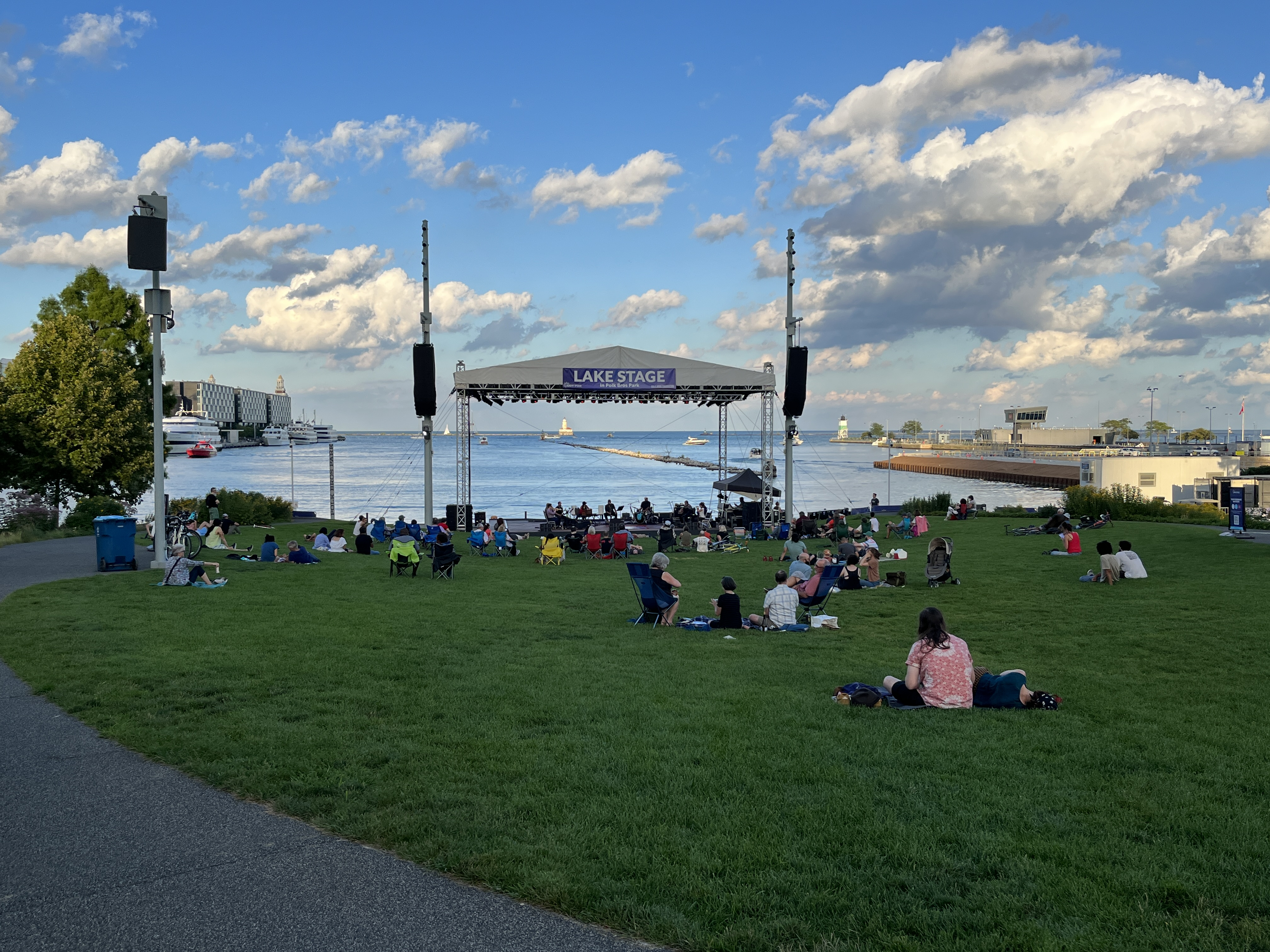
Concert at Lake Stage, 2023

The Polk Bros Performance Lawns are a pair of lawns at the park's south end, with stages City Stage and Lake Stage. City Stage has steps to seat approximately 700–750 people, and faces west, and Lake Stage has an east-facing, sloping lawn which can accommodate approximately 1,700 people. The lawns are separated by a landscaped hilltop.

== History ==
The park and performance laws were funded by a $20 million donation Navy Pier by the Polk family in 2014, and designed by James Corner Field Operations. The performance venues opened in 2017, as part of Navy Pier's 'Centennial Vision' redevelopment, replacing the pier's unused South Dock.

The joint venture Madison Evans Construction Group was hired for the project in 2013. James McHugh Construction contributed to the pavilion, which opened in 2018. The pavilion was underwritten by Peoples Gas.

=== Events ===
The park has hosted concerts, film screenings, and other events, such as fitness classes, ice cream socials, public art exhibitions, and Chicago Shakespeare Theater's Shakespeare in the Park series. The space has been considered to host Taste of Chicago. In 2022, the park hosted a pop-up Pixar-themed mini-golf course.

== See also ==
- Parks in Chicago
  - List of Chicago parks
