= ChicagoFest =

Music festival in Chicago, Illinois, US

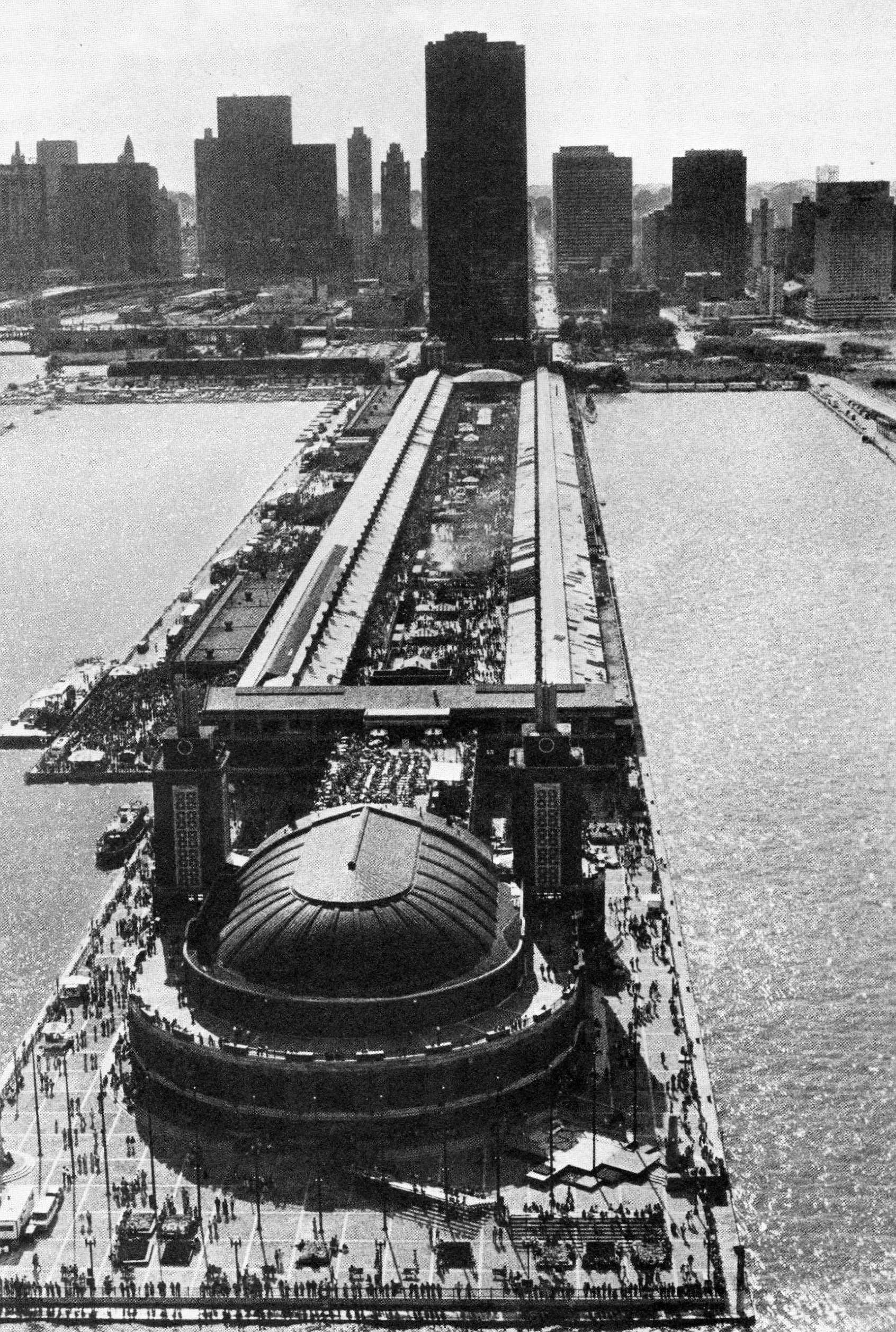
- ChicagoFest at Navy Pier
- Status: Defunct
- Genre: Music Festival
- Frequency: Annual
- Locations: Navy Pier (1978–82); Soldier Field (1983); Chicago, Illinois
- Country: United States
- Years active: 1978–1983
- People: Mayor Michael Bilandic

ChicagoFest was a Chicago music festival established in 1978 by Mayor Michael Bilandic. It was a two-week event held annually at Navy Pier that featured sixteen separate stages, each sponsored by a national retail brand and a media sponsor compatible to the stage's format, e.g. Rock WLUP, Chicago Tribune Jazz, Miller Brewing Company Blues and WXRT, that broadcast live from the festival. The stages were Rock, Classic Rock, Country, Blues, Comedy, Roller Disco, Pin Ball Arcade, Jazz, Children's, Variety, Ethnic, as well as a main stage seating 30,000. There were approximately 600 concert performances by headline artists produced each year.

== History ==
Some of the hundreds of superstars that appeared over the years were Frank Sinatra, The Beach Boys, The Doobie Brothers, Carole King, George Burns, Orleans, Chicago, REO Speedwagon, Willie Nelson with Waylon Jennings, The Blues Brothers, Bobby Vinton, Journey, The Commodores, Kool and The Gang, the Chicago Symphony Orchestra, Charlie Daniels Band, Alice Cooper, Cheap Trick, Aretha Franklin, Ben Vereen, Dick Clark, and Muddy Waters, a live TV broadcast of Bozo's Circus, and productions for HBO and PBS.

In addition to its 30,000 seat main stage, ChicagoFest featured 16 other stage areas that seated 2,500 to 5,000 and presented nationally known recording artists. Iron Maiden, Spyro Gyra, Joan Jett, 38 Special and Point Blank, The Joe Perry Project, Scorpions, Krokus, Wet Willie, and many more appeared on the rock stage; Asleep at the Wheel, Carl Perkins, and Bullseye on the country stage; and Chick Corea and Gary Burton on the jazz stage. The Buckinghams and Jan and Dean were among oldies stage headliners. In 1979, when Germany's Scorpions played one of their first American live concerts on the floating stage at Chicagofest, the Chicago Police Department furnished over one hundred patrolmen for show security.

In addition to music, ChicagoFest also featured a cinema at which the premiere of The Buddy Holly Story attracted Roger Ebert and Gene Siskel, a laser light show, and 100 local food vendors, whose sales grossed ten million dollars annually. MTV's premiere was mounted at ChicagoFest, and The Mike Douglas Show began there.

Admission to the first ChicagoFest, held in 1978, was $3.50 in advance and $4 at the gate. As the festival grew over the years, it attracted roughly 100,000 visitors per day, and approximately 1,000,000 people attended Navy Pier for it. The idea for ChicagoFest was taken from Milwaukee's Summerfest by Joe Balasa of the special events office of Mayor Michael Bilandic, who hired the staff from Milwaukee. That staff, formed as Festivals Inc., included general manager Tom Drilias, food and beverage manager Bill Drilias, entertainment producers Joel Gast and Lou Volpano, marketplace and security manager Ray Rymer, staff architect Don Montgomery, and public relations director Joseph Pecor. The success of the festival led to the creation of the Taste of Chicago, Loop Alive's restoration of the Chicago Theatre, and other events at Navy Pier such as Art Expo Chicago.

== Politics ==
Jane Byrne became mayor in 1979 and attempted to cancel ChicagoFest. However, a public relations campaign mounted by the Chicago Tribune and Labor Unions gained enough support to convince Byrne to reverse her decision. In 1982, after black Chicago residents were angered by Mayor Byrne's nomination of three white board members to new positions in the Chicago Housing Authority, Jesse Jackson and other civil rights leaders called for a boycott of ChicagoFest. Stevie Wonder and over one hundred other local black entertainers cancelled their scheduled appearances, and a picket line was set up outside the festival.
