= Split–Sinj railway =

Former narrow-gauge railway line in Croatia

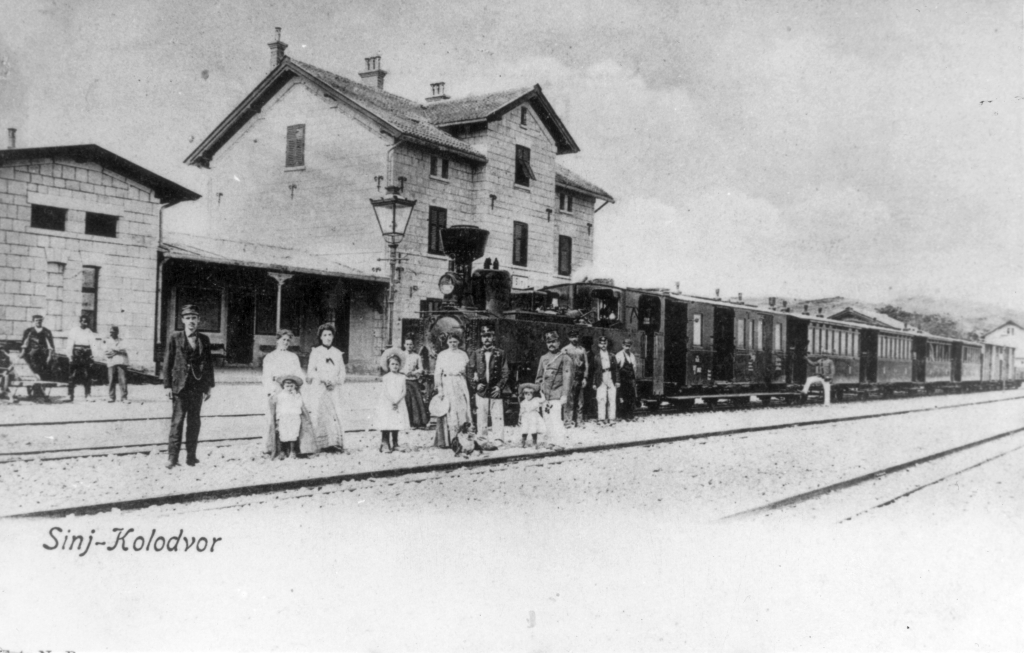
- At the train station in Sinj in 1905

Overview
- Native name: Sinjska rera
- Status: Closed
- Locale: Dalmatian Hinterland
- Termini: Split; Sinj

History
- Commenced: 1901
- Opened: 2 September 1903
- Closed: 30 September 1962 (for passengers)

Technical
- Line length: 40 km (25 mi)
- Track gauge: 760 mm (2 ft 5 15/16 in)
- Operating speed: 30 km/h (19 mph)
Route map

Sinjska rera was a narrow-gauge railway that operated between the Croatian cities of Sinj and Split from 1903 to 1962. It was an economic and social link between the Cetinska Krajina region in Dalmatian Hinterland and the largest Croatian city in the south.

== Name ==
The railway was given several popular names: šuljarica because of its appearance and slowness, sinjska željeznica, sinjski vlak, sinjska ferata. More recently, some authors assumed that the Sinjska rera got its name from the passengers who sang rera, a two-part folk song characteristic of the region. However, folk storytellers in the 1960s agreed that the songs were named after the train that climbed up the hill, and that at the beginning of the century the singing was called kontanje.

== History ==
The railway was planned in the first half of the 19th century as part of a future railway connection between Split and Sarajevo, two trading centers then connected only by road, which took five days to travel. The first section was to be built from Split to the state border in Aržano and with a branch from Dugopolje to Sinj, while the second would connect Aržano and Bugojno.

The railway was part of the plan to connect the Adriatic cargo ports of Dubrovnik, Metković, and later Ploče, with the hinterland and continue towards the Central European railways. Decades passed, and the political situation in the Austro-Hungarian Monarchy was not in favor of the construction of these railways: neither Austria nor Hungary wanted to strengthen the connections between Dalmatia and Croatia, and the Hungarians opposed the railway connection of the Adriatic ports, then under Austrian administration, also because of the competition with the port of Rijeka, which they managed.

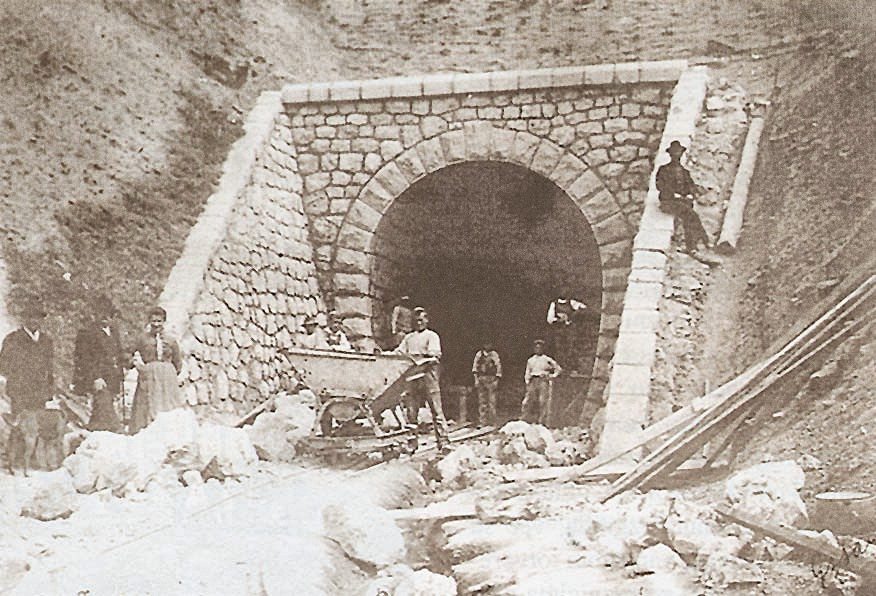
Construction of the Gornja Rupotina tunnel

The Imperial Council Act on Lower-Order Railways of 21 December 1898 marked the beginning of the construction of the railway, fifty-five years after the first Austrian legal decision. Emperor Franz Joseph I himself, at a session of the Imperial Council on 4 February 1901, asked the representatives to deeply evaluate the government's proposal to connect the port of Split with the interior of Bosnia. In the background were political and military interests arising from the existence of a military garrison in Sinj. Construction began with the publication of an auction notice for the takeover of the works by the then Imperial-Royal Railway Ministry in June 1901. The notice also set deadlines for the completion of individual construction projects. However, the notice did not mention the section between Dugopolje and Aržano. Due to the outbreak of World War I and the collapse of the Monarchy, the railway was never built, despite the great interest of the chambers of commerce and trades from Split.

Construction of the railway began in late October 1901. The most difficult physical work was done mainly by local people, and a large number of workers from the Monarchy worked alongside them – as many as 1,500 Italian masons and miners from the province of Apulia, which did not go without protests from local entrepreneurs. The facilities on the railway and all the station buildings were finished by the end of 1902, and the railway was opened on 2 September 1903. During the construction of the railway, the prehistoric hillfort around the Sutikva bend was severely damaged. Fearing unrest due to the trilingual signs at the railway stations (in German, Croatian and Italian), the opening was accompanied by heavy police security. Like the first railway built in Dalmatia (Split – Siverić – Knin with the Perković – Šibenik branch), this railway was also isolated from the rest of the continent until it was connected to the Lika railway at Knin in 1925.

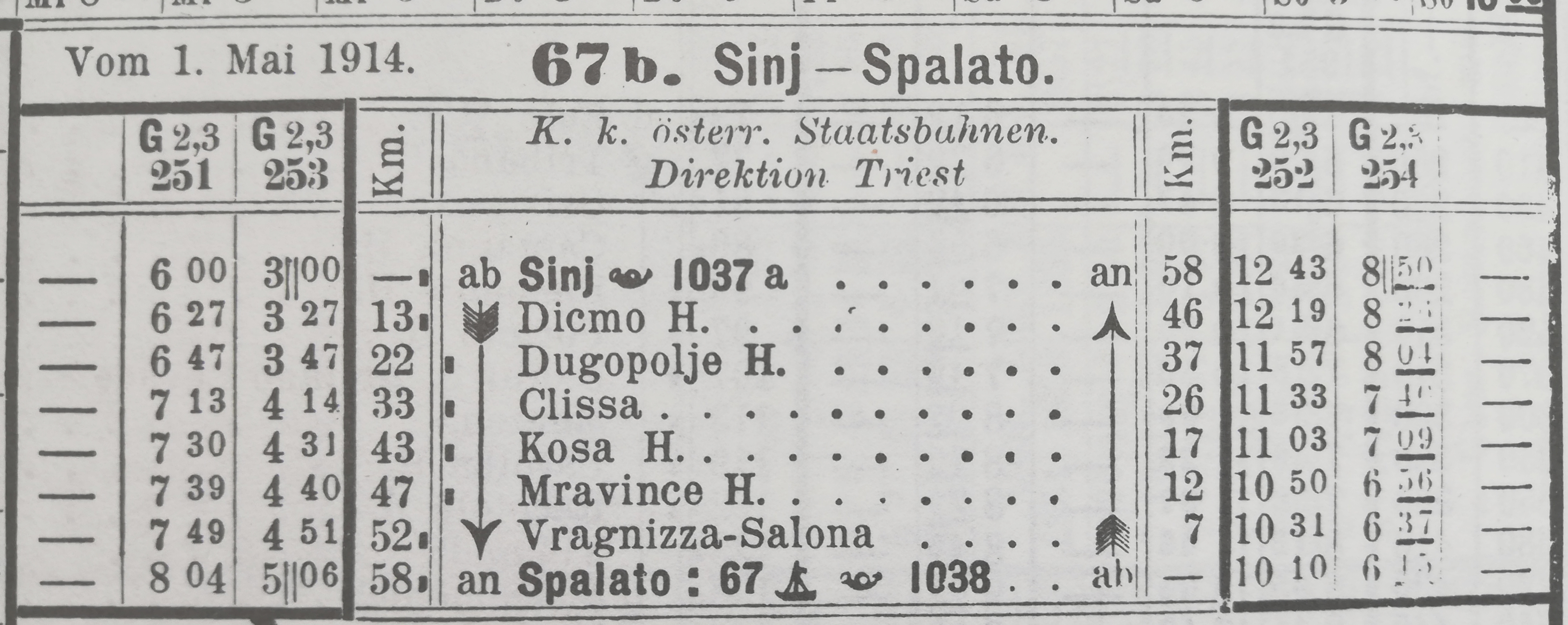
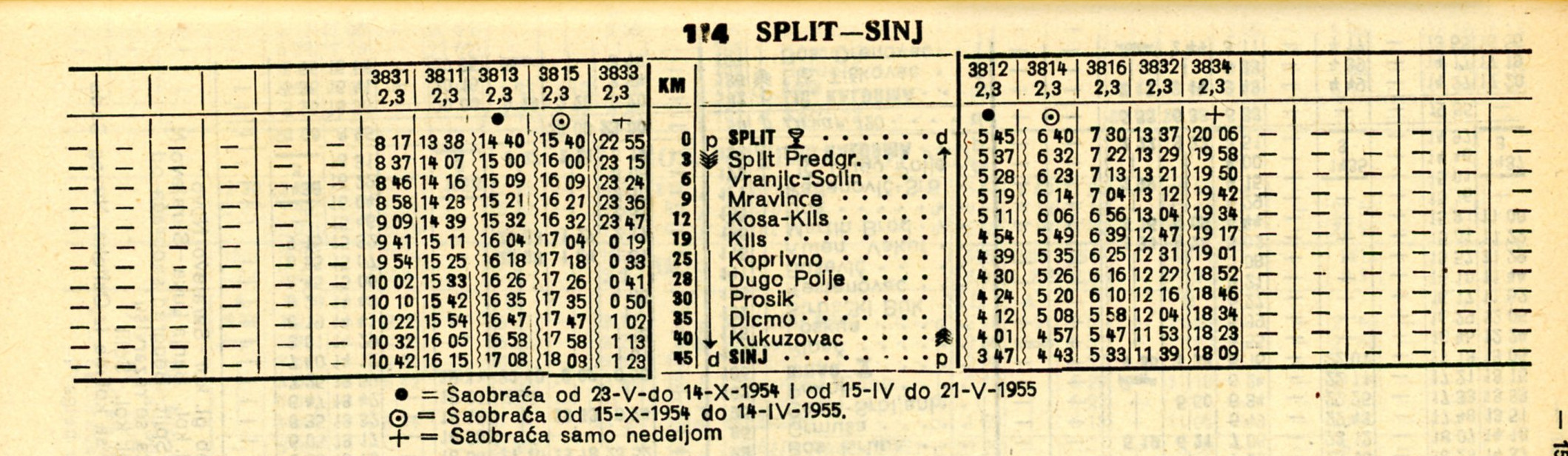
Timetable from 1914 and 1954

Trains ran twice a day in each direction, and the journey took two hours and 30 minutes from Sinj to Split, and three hours in the opposite direction, which involved overcoming the steep hill of Klis. There were no first-class carriages, while both second and third class were inaccessible to the public. Due to frequent locomotive breakdowns, overloading and a small number of railway workers, trains were on average half an hour late.

During World War II, the trains and the railway were repeatedly damaged in sabotage operations, so bunkers were built in front of the bridges and tunnels for the soldiers of the Independent State of Croatia. When it became impossible to maintain safe traffic, the Croatian State Railways discontinued it, and part of the tracks were dismantled. After the war, the number of trains increased from two to four to five per day due to the increased volume of passenger traffic. Although the rolling stock was rejuvenated in the late 1950s by purchasing seven passenger carriages, due to the development of road traffic and the decrease in the volume of traffic on the railway, people began to think about closing it. The decrease in passenger traffic was significantly visible in 1960, when a 25% drop was recorded compared to 1959, and in 1961, with a 51% drop compared to 1959. At the same time, the decrease in freight traffic was 36% and 49%, respectively. Due to the losses and the need to overhaul the line and replace the rolling stock, which required large funds, the Croatian Parliament proposed in April 1962 that it be closed to public use and dismantled. Before that, the Split-Sinj road had to be completed and about ten buses had to be purchased. The last passenger train, number 3834, on the Split-Sinj line left Sinj on 30 September 1962. Freight traffic continued for some time. The following year, the line was dismantled, and the locomotives and wagons were moved to Gornji Milanovac in Serbia.

== Technical characteristics ==
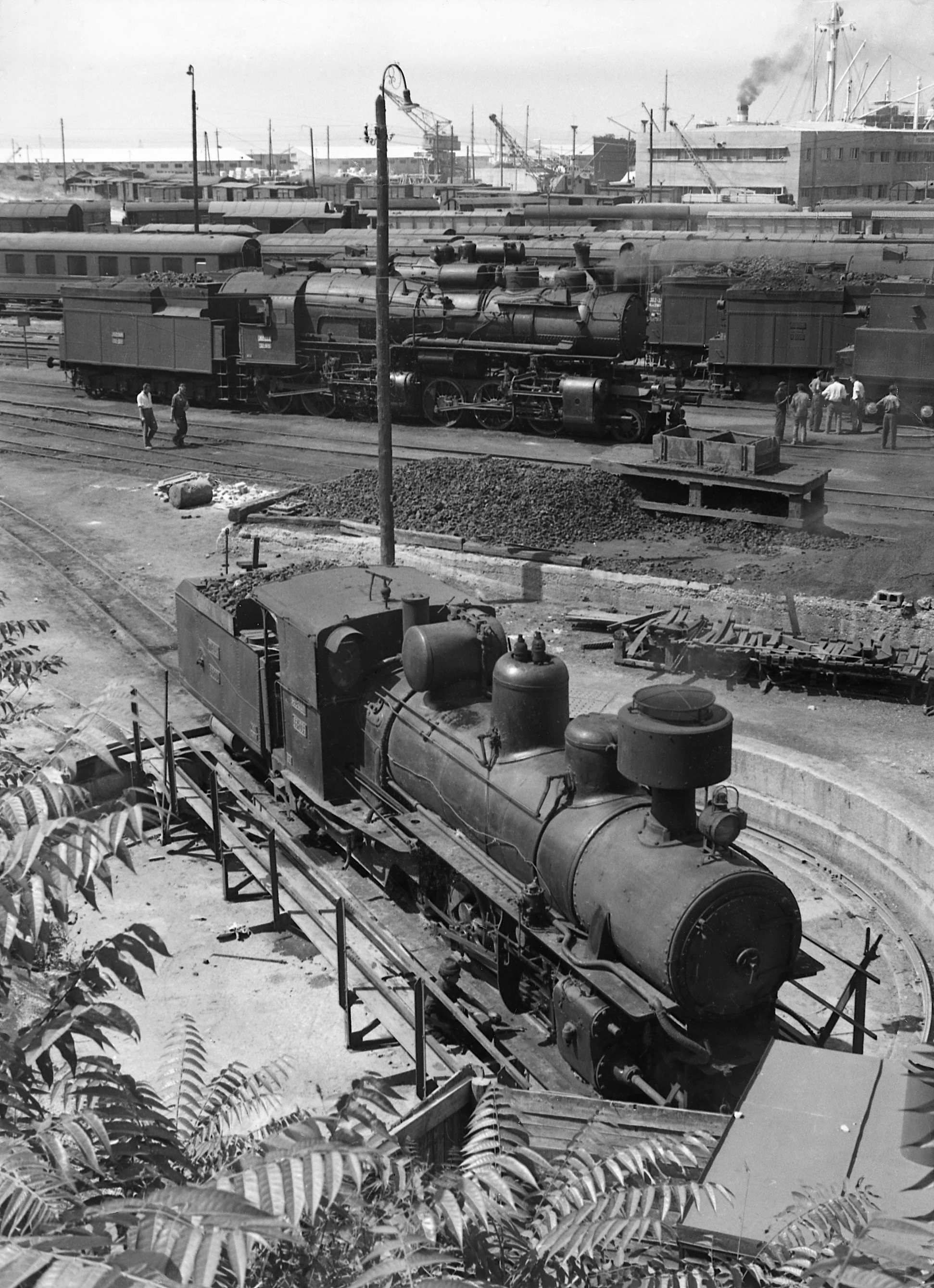
A "JŽ 83-092" locomotive on the turn table in Split in 1952

The railway was 39.972 km long, and had the characteristics of a mountain railway with gradual changes in elevation, with a maximum gradient of 26.7‰. The lowest elevation point on the railway was 2.4 m above sea level in Split, and the highest 386.2 m above sea level at Kukuzovac near Sinj. Three tunnels were built on the railway: the tunnel in Gornja Rupotina, 400 m long, the Tri kralja tunnel on Greben, 123 m long, and the Jadro tunnel, later called Mačkovac, 118 m long. Another tunnel was subsequently built at the entrance to the Split railway station. Of the larger railway structures, a stone overpass (at Meterize, near the Vranjic-Solin railway station, 10 m long), the stone viaduct Vetmin most (in Klis, below Varoš, 76.8 m long), and an iron bridge (in the Grlo area, with a span of 8 m) were also built. There were 117 crossings and 20 drainage channels for rainwater on the railway route.

In addition to the previously built station in Split, five more stations were built (Vranjic-Solin, Klis, Dugopolje, Dicmo and Sinj) and three stops (Mravinci, Klis-Kosa and Prosik). Three more stops were built later: in Koprivno and Kukuzovac, and in the Split suburb of Kopilica. The stations and stops were built in a typical manner and made of stone, without waiting rooms.

The tracks were built in Graz in 1903. The gauge was 760 mm. Some 47,100 wooden sleepers were laid at 800 mm intervals. The maximum permissible axle load was 4,700 kg, and the maximum permissible speed on the track was 30 km/h, but for safety reasons the train rarely ran over 20 km/h. The freight and passenger carriage combinations were powered by steam locomotives of the 188 type C1t series, and the 186 type C2 series, mainly produced at the Krauss factory in Linz with a maximum tractive force of up to 40 tonnes. After World War II, six small steam locomotives of the 83 type D1 series, built at the Krauss factory in Linz and at the Mavag factory in Budapest, were in service. Seven Pullmann passenger carriages from the Đuro Đaković company from Slavonski Brod were purchased as part of the modernization in 1956.

== History of accidents ==
- On 13 September 1903, the day after the opening marked by heavy security, a 40 kg stone was spotted in front of the Klis tunnel, but the train with more than a hundred passengers stopped on time.
- On18 January 1904, a train overturned at Majdan due to a bora wind; 16 passengers were injured and several carriages were damaged or destroyed. The experience of the overturned train in which he was then found was described by the Croatian writer Janko Polić Kamov in his novella Katastrofa.
- On 7 March 1926, a train overturned at Ravnica due to a bora wind, causing three minor injuries.
- On 17 June 1930, at the Klis station, a train derailed and veered into a ditch, causing material damage.

== Gallery ==
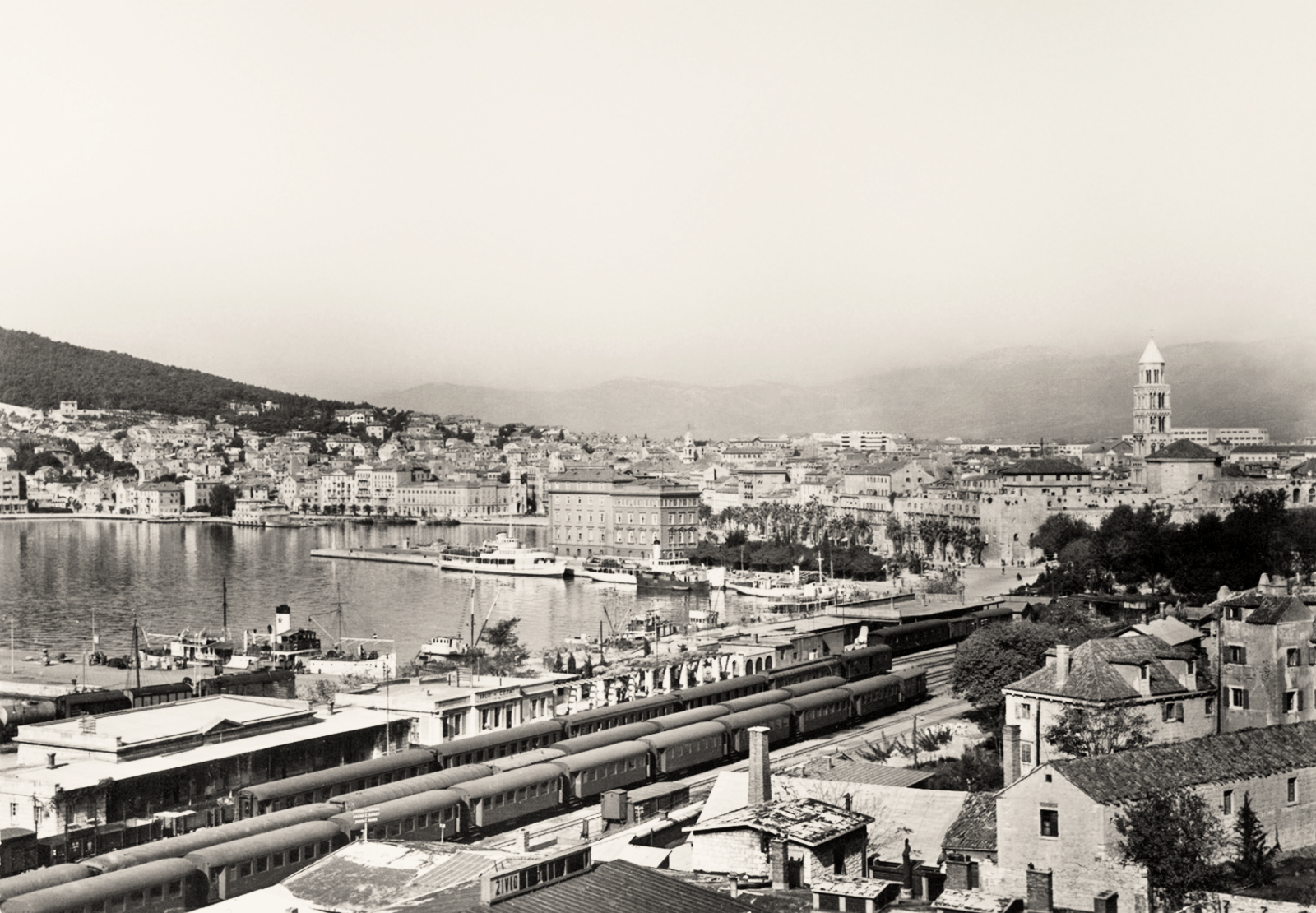
Split railway station around 1955

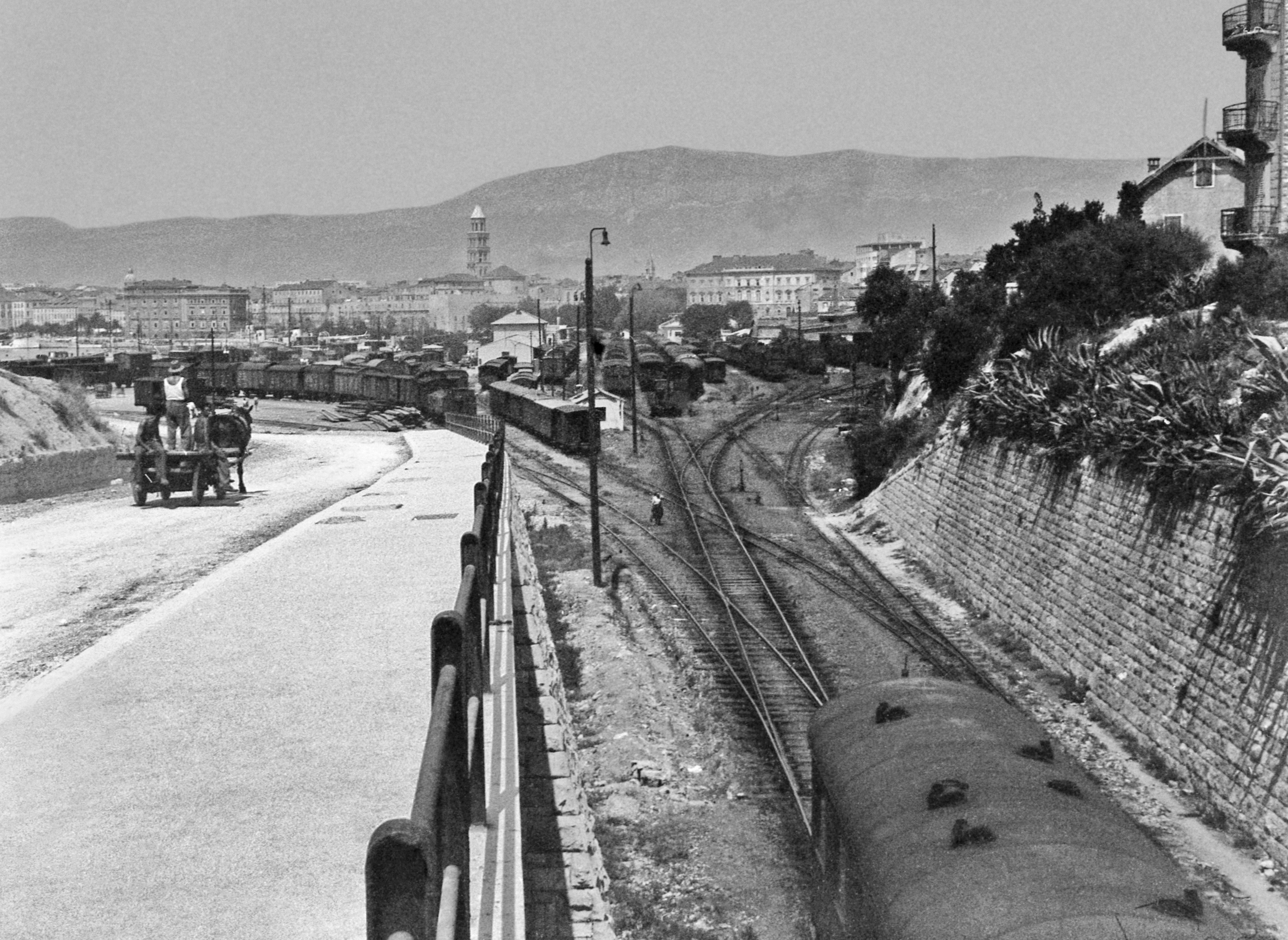
Narrow gauge for Sinjska rera in 1952

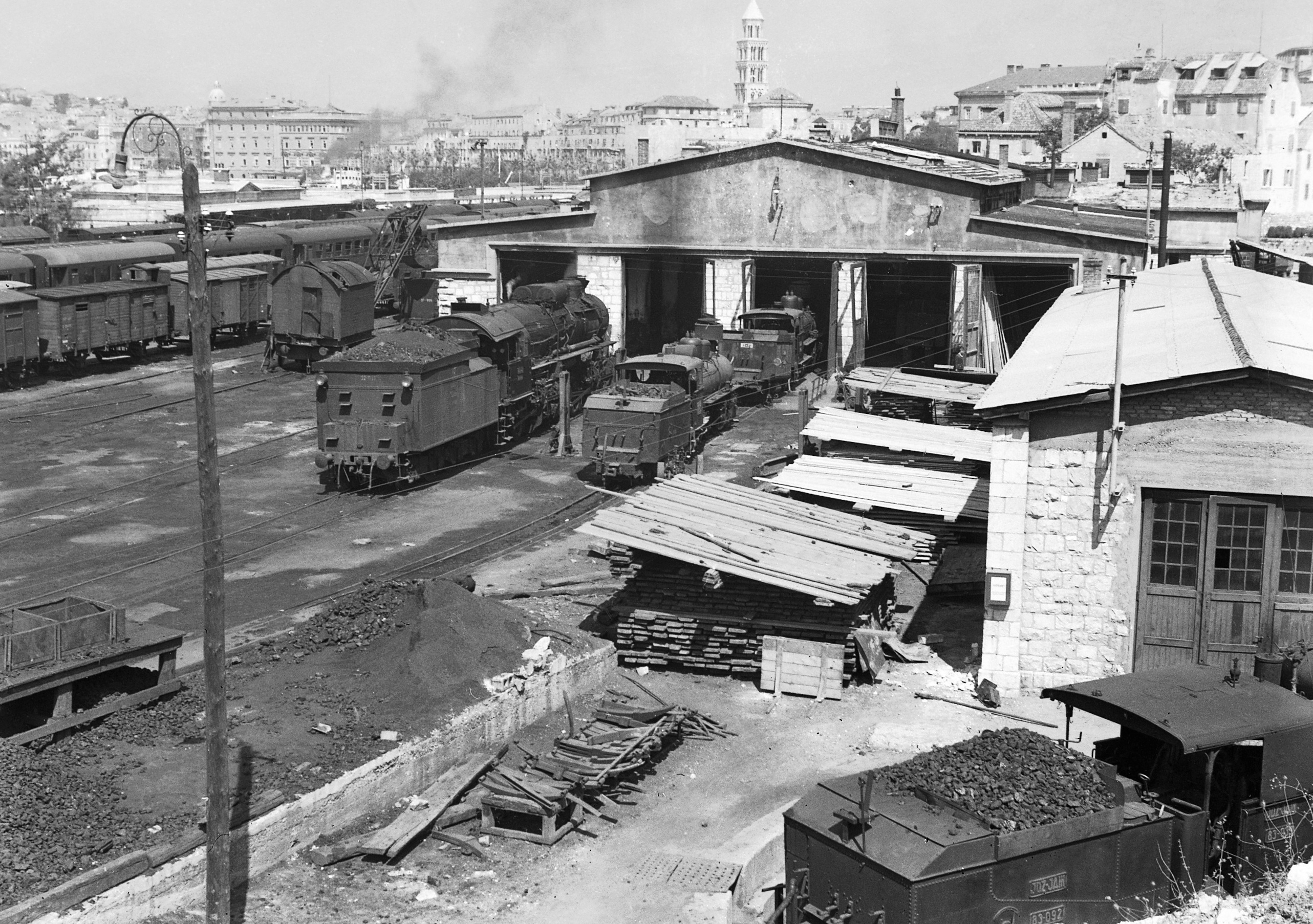
Train depot in Split in 1952.

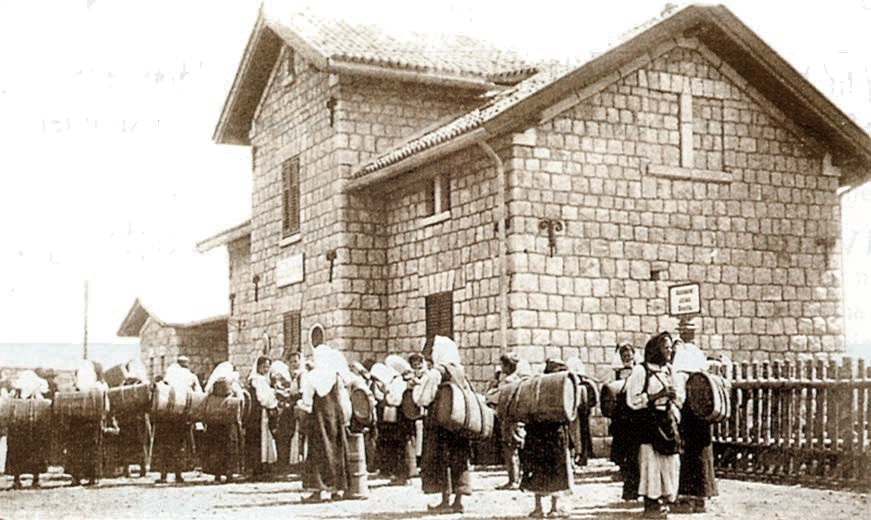
Dugopolje train station

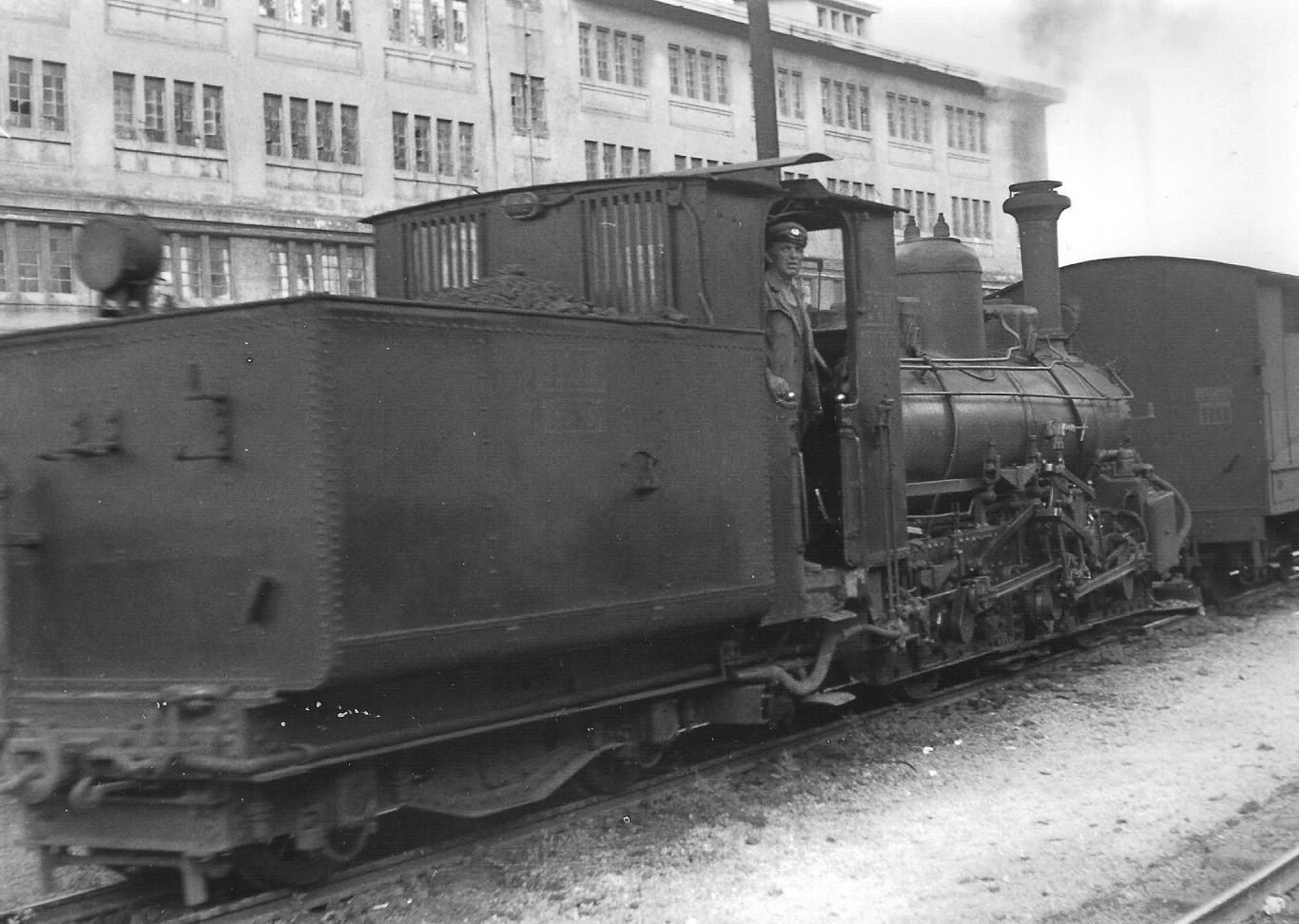
"Klose 186-007" locomotive in Dubrovnik in 1965. Locomotives of the same class operated on the Split-Sinj railway.
