= Crack the Whip (sculpture) =

Sculpture by J. Seward Johnson

- The sculpture in Chicago, 2023
- Location: 41°53′25.8″N 87°36′35.1″W

Crack the Whip is a sculpture by J. Seward Johnson. The artwork depicts eight children at play. One copy was installed in a cemetery in Flint, Michigan. The copy at Chicago's Navy Pier was installed in 1996.
