= Captain on the Helm =

Bronze sculpture by Michael Martino installed in Chicago, Illinois, U.S.

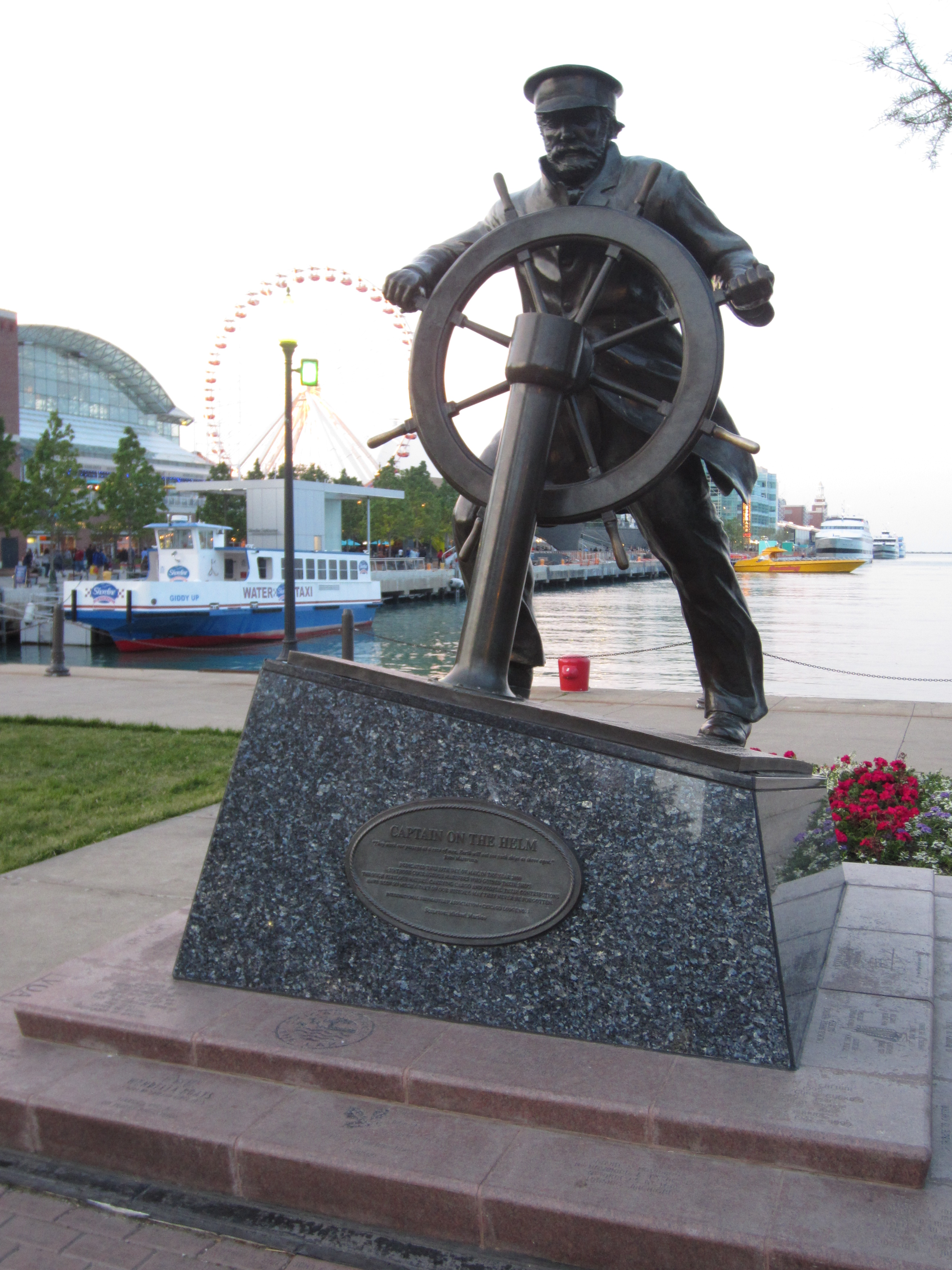
- The statue in 2015
- Artist: Michael Martino
- Medium: Bronze sculpture
- Location: Chicago, Illinois, U.S.
- 41.890711°N 87.609667°W

Captain on the Helm, also known as Captain at the Helm, is an outdoor bronze sculpture by Michael Martino, installed at Chicago's Navy Pier, in the U.S. state of Illinois. The statue was donated by the Chicago Lodge of Shipmasters International and dedicated on May 19, 2000. A plaque reads, "To those courageous mariners who guided their ships through perilous waters, carrying cargo and people. Their contributions have been so much a part of our history. May they never be forgotten."
