= Michael A. Bilandic =

American politician and judge

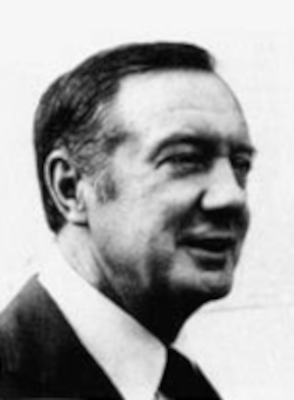
- Bilandic, in 1987

Chief Justice of the Illinois Supreme Court
- In office January 1, 1994 – January 1, 1997
- Preceded by: Benjamin K. Miller
- Succeeded by: James D. Heiple

Justice of the Supreme Court of Illinois
- In office November 2, 1990 – August 30, 2000
- Preceded by: Daniel P. Ward
- Succeeded by: Thomas R. Fitzgerald

49th Mayor of Chicago
- In office December 28, 1976 – April 16, 1979; Acting until June 22, 1977
- Deputy: Casey Laskowski
- Preceded by: Richard J. Daley
- Succeeded by: Jane Byrne

Member of the Chicago City Council from the 11th Ward
- In office June 12, 1969 – June 7, 1977
- Preceded by: Matthew J. Danaher
- Succeeded by: Patrick M. Huels

Personal details
- Born: Michael Anthony Bilandic; February 13, 1923 Chicago, Illinois, U.S.
- Died: January 15, 2002 (aged 78) Chicago, Illinois, U.S.
- Resting place: St. Mary's Cemetery; Evergreen Park, Illinois, U.S.
- Party: Democratic
- Spouse: Heather Morgan (m. 1977)
- Children: 1
- Education: De La Salle Institute; St. Mary's University of Minnesota (BA); DePaul University College of Law (JD)

Military service
- Allegiance: United States
- Branch/service: United States Marine Corps
- Years of service: 1943–1945
- Rank: First Lieutenant
- Battles/wars: World War II

Michael Anthony Bilandic (February 13, 1923 – January 15, 2002) was an American Democratic politician, judge, and attorney who served as the 49th mayor of Chicago from 1976 to 1979, after the death of his predecessor, Richard J. Daley. Bilandic practiced law in Chicago for several years, having graduated from the DePaul University College of Law. Bilandic served as an alderman in Chicago City Council, representing the eleventh ward on the south-west side (Bridgeport neighborhood) from June 1969 until he began his tenure as mayor in December 1976. After his mayoralty, Bilandic served on the Illinois Appellate Court from 1984 until being elected to the Illinois Supreme Court in 1990. He served on the state supreme court until 2000, and was the court’s chief Justice from 1994 to 1997.

== Early life and career ==
Bilandic was born in Chicago to Croatian immigrant parents. His father Mate "Matthew" Bilandžić was from Krušvar in Dalmatian Hinterland, and his mother Milka "Minnie" Bilandžić, née Lebedina from Bobovišća on the island of Brač. Bilandic studied at De La Salle High School and graduated in 1940. Bilandic joined the United States Marine Corps during World War II in 1943, serving as first lieutenant until 1945. After his time in the Marine Corps, Bilandic returned to school; receiving his bachelor's degree from St. Mary's University of Minnesota in 1947. After college, Bilandic returned to Chicago and became involved in political work. Bilandic began working in the city's eleventh ward was asked by then–committeeman Richard J. Daley to aid the Democratic party in 1948. In 1951, Bilandic later received his Juris Doctor degree from DePaul University College of Law.

== Chicago City Council (1969–1977) ==
Bilandic officially began his political career after being elected alderman of the city's eleventh ward in the 1969 election, succeeding Matthew J. Danaher and taking office on March 11, 1969.

== Acting mayoralty (1976–77) and special election victory ==
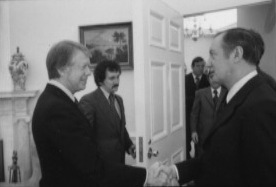
Bilandic (right) meets with President Jimmy Carter in the Oval Office of the White House in February 1977

After Mayor Richard J. Daley died in office on December 20, 1976, Wilson Frost argued that as president pro tempore of the City Council he had automatically become the acting mayor. As such, he would have been the first African American to serve as mayor. However, much of the city council disputed Frost's claim. After nearly a week of closed-door negotiations, a compromise was struck among councilors in which the city council would vote to name Bilandic to serve as acting mayor for approximately six months until a special election could be held to choose a mayor filling out the remaining two years of Daley's unexpired term. This came with the agreed understanding that Bilandic would not run as a candidate in the special election. Other aspects of the compromise that resulted in Bilandic becoming mayor had included the council voting to name Frost the chairman of the council's powerful Finance Committee, a position with real power as opposed to the primarily ceremonial role of president pro tempore. This served to appease African American aldermen. The compromise also included satisfying the city's grouping of Polish American aldermen by naming Casey Laskowski (a member of the council's Polish American bloc) to serve in the newly-created role of vice mayor. The new vice mayor position was created in aims of clarifying the mayoral succession process in the future by creating a position that would be the first-in-line to serve as an interim successor in instances of mayoral vacancy.

On December 28 (eight days after Daley's death), Bilandic was approved by the City Council to serve as acting mayor. No other candidates challenged him. While the vote was preceded by fiery debate, Dick Simpson and Martin J. Oberman were ultimately the sole alderman to cast dissenting votes on Bilandic's appointment. At the same meeting that it appointed Bilandic, the council also voted for the other aspects of the compromise: naming Frost as chairman of the finance committee, Vrdolyak as president pro tempore, and Laskowski as vice mayor. Despite that he would not run in the special election, one mere week after becoming acting mayor Bilandic reneged on this promise and declared that he would be amenable to running if he was drafted to do so. Bilandic ultimately ran. Still enjoying a honeymoon period as acting mayor, he received a popular mandate to assume Daley's mantle. In the Democratic's primary election, he won 51.1% of the vote, handily defeating challengers Edward Hanrahan, Anthony Martin-Trigona, Roman Pucinski, Ellis Reid and Harold Washington. In the June 7 general election, Bilandic was elected mayor with 77.4% of the vote, defeating Dennis H. Block (the Republican nominee), as well as Dennis Brasky (the Socialist Labor nominee) and Gerald Rose (the U.S. Labor nominee). Bilandic delivered his inaugural address and took office on June 22, 1977.

== Mayoralty (1977–79) ==
While initially popular, Bilandic's term as mayor would prove to be short and difficult.

A 1993 survey of historians, political scientists and urban experts conducted by Melvin G. Holli of the University of Illinois at Chicago ranked Bilandic as the twenty-first-worst American big-city mayor to have served between the years 1820 and 1993.

=== Labor strikes ===
While he was mayor, Chicago faced several labor disputes including a gravediggers and cemetery owners' strike and a threatened strike by members of Lyric Opera of Chicago. The Chicago Butcher's Union worked to stop stores from selling fresh meat after 6 p.m., but Bilandic managed to work out a settlement. Bilandic also had to face social unrest in June 1977 when an FALN bomb exploded in City Hall and started a two-day riot among the Puerto Rican community. Bilandic oversaw the creation of ChicagoFest, a food and music festival held on Navy Pier. The Chicago Marathon had its first running in 1977 and Bilandic participated, finishing with a time of 4 hours. A runner himself, Bilandic arranged to have five miles of unused equestrian paths along the lakefront converted to running paths.

=== Blizzard of 1979 ===
During January 1979, a blizzard struck Chicago and effectively closed down the city, dropping a total of twenty-one inches of snow over a two-day period. The city's slow response to the debilitating storm was publicly blamed on Bilandic. Additionally, as part of attempts to deal with the storm, Bilandic ordered Chicago 'L' trains to bypass many intermediate stops, particularly affecting black neighborhoods on the South Side of the city, and angering that large voter base.

=== Urban development ===
In November 1978, Bilandic unveiled a broad $7.4 billion five-year public works plan to reshape much of the city. These plans included the construction a new State of Illinois office building on the site occupied by shuttered Sherman House Hotel. This would ultimately be realized with the construction of the James R. Thompson Center.

=== 1979 Democratic primary loss ===
Bilandic sought re-election in 1979, and was challenged in the Democratic primary by the former longtime city consumer affairs department head Jane Byrne, whom Bilandic had fired in 1977. Bilandic's candidacy was dragged down by dissatisfaction with the city's handling of the recent snowstorm, as well as other issues. Many Republicans crossover voted in the Democratic primary against Bilandic in hopes of delivering a defeat to the Democratic machine that had dominated Chicago politics for decades. Byrne's challenge was also boosted by the endorsement of Reverend Jesse Jackson. Additionally, many North Side and Northwest Side voters supported Byrne against Bildanic because they were angered by the Cook County Democratic leadership's slating of only South Side and Southwest Side candidates for the citywide offices (mayor, clerk, and treasurer) in its endorsements ahead of the primary. Bilandic very narrowly lost the primary, winning 49% to Byrne's 51%. Byrne went on to win the general election with a record-setting 82% of the vote, becoming Chicago's first female mayor.

== Judicial career ==
Following his term as mayor, Bilandic was elected to the Illinois Appellate Court in 1984, and then the Illinois Supreme Court in 1990, where Bilandic served until 2000. From 1994 until 1996, Bilandic served as the Illinois chief justice.

== Personal life and death ==
On June 1, 1977, Bilandic married Chicago socialite Heather Morgan in a ceremony officiated by Chicago's Archbishop John Cardinal Cody. Bilandic and Morgan had a son, Michael M. Bilandic Jr., born in 1978.

On January 15, 2002, Bilandic died from heart failure and was interred in St. Mary's Cemetery in Evergreen Park, Illinois.

== Works cited ==
- Drell, Adrienne, ed. (2000). 20th Century Chicago: 100 years 100 voices. Sports Publishing. ISBN 1-58261-239-0.

Political offices
Preceded by Richard J. Daley	Mayor of Chicago; December 20, 1976 – April 16, 1979	Succeeded by Jane Byrne
