= Kraj, Split-Dalmatia County =

Settlement in Split-Dalmatia County, Croatia

Kraj
- Settlement
- Interactive map of Kraj
- Location within Croatia
- Coordinates: 43°38′17″N 16°34′55″E
- Country: Croatia
- County: Split-Dalmatia
- Municipality: Dicmo

Area
  - Total: 4.7 km^{2} (1.8 sq mi)

Population (2021)
  - Total: 689
  - Density: 150/km^{2} (380/sq mi)
- Time zone: UTC+1 (CET)
  - Summer (DST): UTC+2 (CEST)
- Postal code: 21232 Dicmo
- Area code: +385 (0)21

Kraj is a settlement in the Municipality of Dicmo, Croatia, and its administrative center. In 2021, its population was 689. Kraj consists of the hamlets of Brda, Grubuša Velika, Kraj Osoje, Kraj Sušci and Križice.

The village houses the parish church of the Dicmo Donje parish, dedicated to Saint James the Apostle and Saint Anne, built in the Romanesque Revival style in 1934. The old parish church is located at the cemetery and was built sometime before 1709.

One of the stations of the Split–Sinj railway was in Kraj from 1902 to 1962. In 2024, a theme park was dedicated to the railway next to the old cut-stone station building.

== Demographics ==
Kraj: Population trends 1857–2021
v

population	156	408	367	444	489	244	480	598	234	242	290	323	363	426	442	514	689
	1857	1869	1880	1890	1900	1910	1921	1931	1948	1953	1961	1971	1981	1991	2001	2011	2021

Sources: Croatian Bureau of Statistics publications
