= Sušci =

Settlement in Split-Dalmatia County, Croatia

- Settlement
- Interactive map of Sušci
- Location within Croatia
- Coordinates: 43°38′05″N 16°33′36″E
- Country: Croatia
- County: Split-Dalmatia
- Municipality: Dicmo

Area
  - Total: 12.0 km^{2} (4.6 sq mi)

Population (2021)
  - Total: 90
  - Density: 7.5/km^{2} (19/sq mi)
- Time zone: UTC+1 (CET)
  - Summer (DST): UTC+2 (CEST)
- Postal code: 21232 Dicmo
- Area code: +385 (0)21

Sušci is a settlement in the Municipality of Dicmo in Croatia. In 2021, its population was 90.

== Demographics ==
Sušci: Population trends 1857–2021
v

population	432	546	511	555	628	733	680	764	564	597	560	411	292	224	143	122	90
	1857	1869	1880	1890	1900	1910	1921	1931	1948	1953	1961	1971	1981	1991	2001	2011	2021

Sources: Croatian Bureau of Statistics publications
