= Osoje, Croatia =

Settlement in Split-Dalmatia County, Croatia

Osoje
- Settlement
- Interactive map of Osoje
- Location within Croatia
- Coordinates: 43°37′06″N 16°35′21″E
- Country: Croatia
- County: Split-Dalmatia
- Municipality: Dicmo

Area
  - Total: 6.8 km^{2} (2.6 sq mi)

Population (2021)
  - Total: 387
  - Density: 57/km^{2} (150/sq mi)
- Time zone: UTC+1 (CET)
  - Summer (DST): UTC+2 (CEST)
- Postal code: 21232 Dicmo
- Area code: +385 (0)21

Osoje is a settlement in the Municipality of Dicmo in Croatia. In 2021, its population was 387.

== Demographics ==
Osoje: Population trends 1857–2021
v

population	261		125	64	135	322			364	374	457	413	400	280	348	388	387
	1857	1869	1880	1890	1900	1910	1921	1931	1948	1953	1961	1971	1981	1991	2001	2011	2021

Note:In 1869, 1921 and 1931, the data were contained in the settlement of Kraj, Split-Dalmatia County. Until 1910, it was reported as part of the settlement. Sources: Croatian Bureau of Statistics publications
