= Podosoje, Srebrenica =

Podosoje Подосоје
- Village
- Location within Bosnia and Herzegovina
- Coordinates: 44°05′57″N 19°11′52″E
- Country: Bosnia and Herzegovina
- Municipality: Srebrenica
- Time zone: UTC+1 (CET)
  - Summer (DST): UTC+2 (CEST)

Podosoje (Srebrenica) is a village in the municipality of Srebrenica, Bosnia and Herzegovina.
