= Prisoje, Croatia =

Settlement in Split-Dalmatia County, Croatia

Prisoje
- Settlement
- Interactive map of Prisoje
- Location of Prisoje in Croatia
- Coordinates: 43°37′49″N 16°36′24″E
- Country: Croatia
- County: Split-Dalmatia
- Municipality: Dicmo

Area
  - Total: 11.2 km^{2} (4.3 sq mi)

Population (2021)
  - Total: 610
  - Density: 54/km^{2} (140/sq mi)
- Time zone: UTC+1 (CET)
  - Summer (DST): UTC+2 (CEST)
- Postal code: 21232 Dicmo
- Area code: +385 (0)21

Prisoje is a village within the area of the Municipality of Dicmo in Croatia. In 2021, its population was 610.

== Demographics ==
Prisoje: Population trends 1857–2021
v

population	413	475	506	619	456	738	759	720	734	763	752	746	742	739	649	643	610
	1857	1869	1880	1890	1900	1910	1921	1931	1948	1953	1961	1971	1981	1991	2001	2011	2021

Sources: Croatian Bureau of Statistics publications

== Landmarks ==
Our Lady of Health Church or Gospica Church in Prisoje is one of the oldest churches in the parish of Dicmo. Built at the end of the 17th century, it was expanded and upgraded on several occasions. In 2005, a new altar was installed and church utensils renovated, including the chalice dating from 1604.
