= Osoje, Vareš =

Village in Vareš, Bosnia and Herzegovina

Osoje Осоје
- Village
- Location within Bosnia and Herzegovina
- Coordinates: 44.1748296°N 18.351802°E
- Country: Bosnia and Herzegovina
- Entity: Federation of Bosnia and Herzegovina
- Canton: Zenica-Doboj
- Municipality: Vareš

Area
  - Total: 1.06 sq mi (2.74 km^{2})

Population (2013)
  - Total: 27
  - Density: 26/sq mi (9.9/km^{2})
- Time zone: UTC+1 (CET)
  - Summer (DST): UTC+2 (CEST)

Osoje is a village in the municipality of Vareš, Bosnia and Herzegovina.

== Demographics ==
According to the 2013 census, its population was 27.

Ethnicity in 2013
Ethnicity	Number	Percentage
Croats	24	88.9%
other/undeclared	3	11.1%
Total	27	100%
