= Navy Pier =

Historic pier in Chicago, Illinois

- Formerly listed on the U.S. National Register of Historic Places
- Chicago Landmark
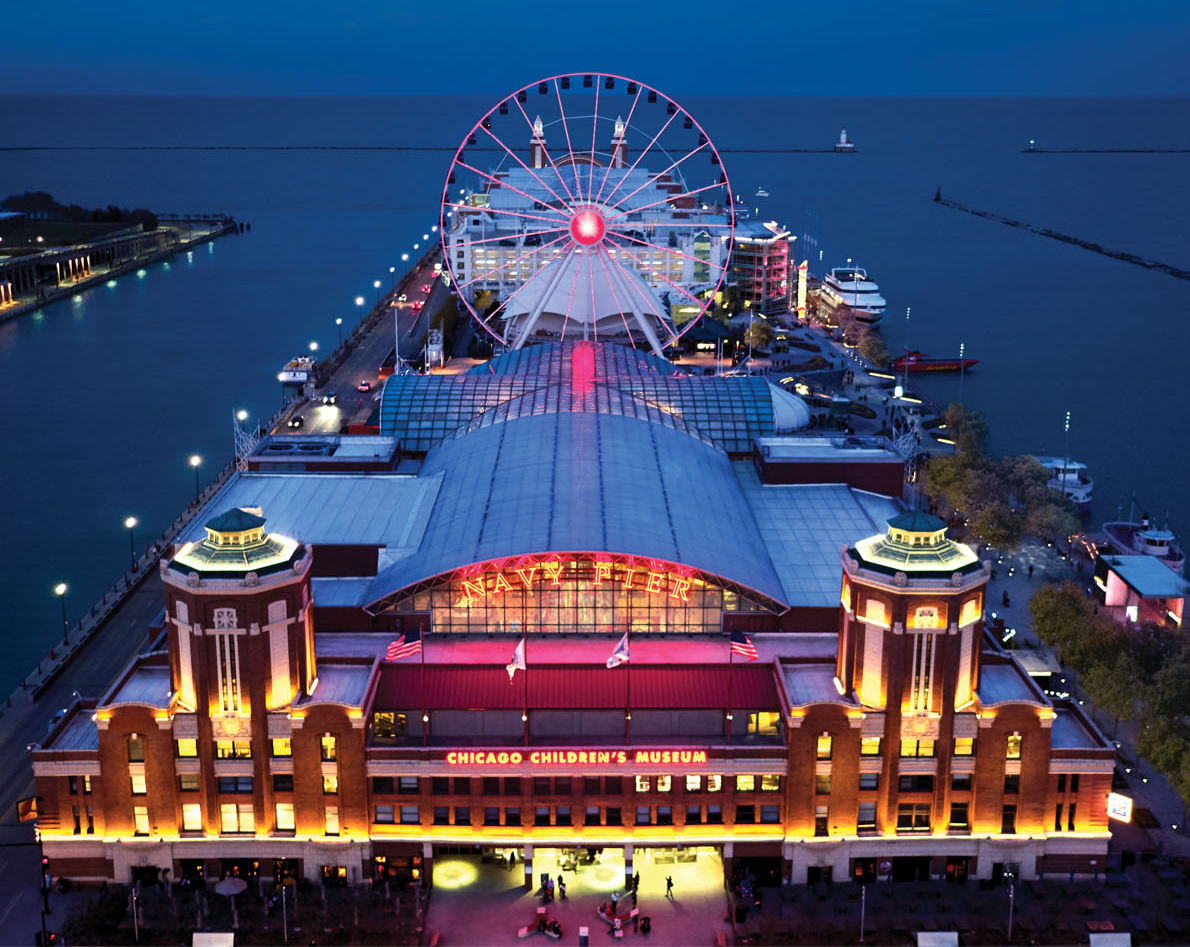

- Location within Chicago metropolitan area
- Location: 600 E. Grand Avenue; Chicago, Illinois, 60611
- Coordinates: 41°53′29″N 87°35′59″W
- Built: 1916
- Architects: Charles S. Frost; E.C. Shankland
- Website: navypier.org
- NRHP reference No.: 79000825

Significant dates
- Added to NRHP: September 13, 1979
- Designated CHICL: November 14, 1977
- Removed from NRHP: February 14, 1992

Navy Pier is a 3,300-foot-long (1,010 m) pier on the shoreline of Lake Michigan, located in the Streeterville neighborhood of the Near North Side community area in Chicago, Illinois, United States. The pier encompasses over 50 acres (20 ha) of shops, restaurants, live theaters, family attractions, parks (including Polk Bros Park), gardens, and exhibition facilities. Navy Pier is one of the top destinations in the Midwestern United States, drawing over nine million visitors annually. It is one of the most visited attractions in the Midwestern United States, and is Chicago's second most visited tourist attraction.

== History ==
=== Military usage ===
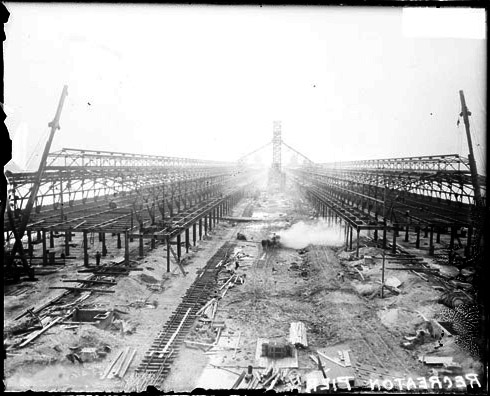
During construction, 1915 (Chicago Daily News)

Navy Pier opened to the public on July 15, 1916. Originally known as Municipal Pier, it was built by Charles Sumner Frost, a nationally known architect, with a design based on the 1909 Plan of Chicago by Daniel Burnham and Edward H. Bennett. Its original purpose was to serve as a dock for freighters, passenger ships, and indoor and outdoor recreation; events like expositions and pageants were held there. The pier was built atop 20,000 logs imported from Oregon that were piled into the lake bed of Lake Michigan.

In mid-1918, the pier was also used as a jail for draft dodgers. In 1927, the pier was renamed Navy Pier to honor the naval veterans who served in World War I.

In 1941, during World War II, the pier became a training center for the United States Navy; about 10,000 people worked, trained and lived there. The pier contained a 2,500-seat theater, gym, 12-chair barber shop, tailor, cobbler shops, soda fountain and a vast kitchen and hospital. The pier was home to the USS Wolverine and USS Sable, training carriers that qualified 18,000 naval aviators.

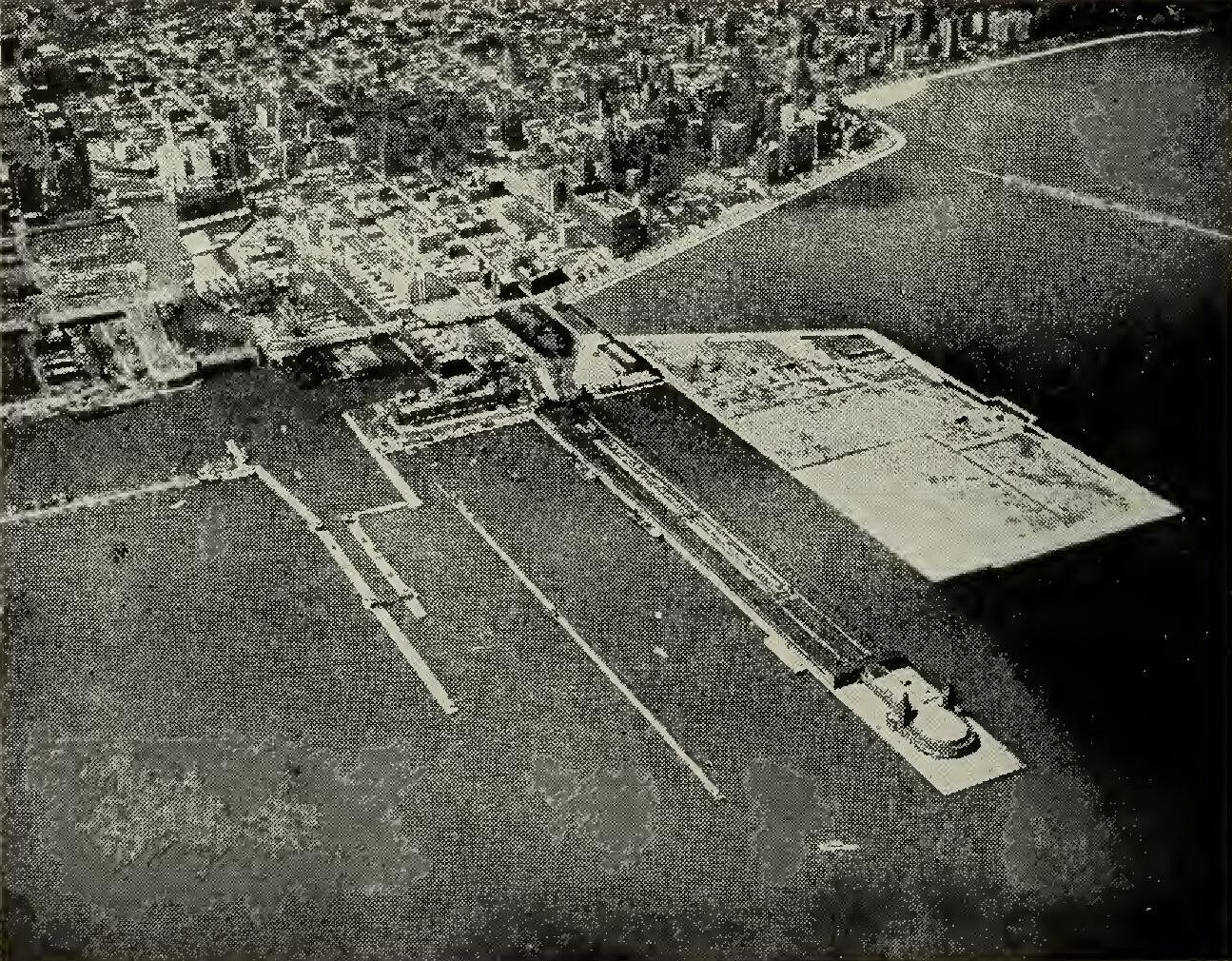
circa 1963

Beginning in 1946, as the Navy was winding down from its mission, the University of Illinois held classes at the pier, especially to serve the high demand from returning service members. As the maximum capacity was exceeded, the school outgrew the pier, the University of Illinois at Chicago was partly founded as a result. After the university left, Navy Pier became underutilized.

=== Later use and redevelopment ===
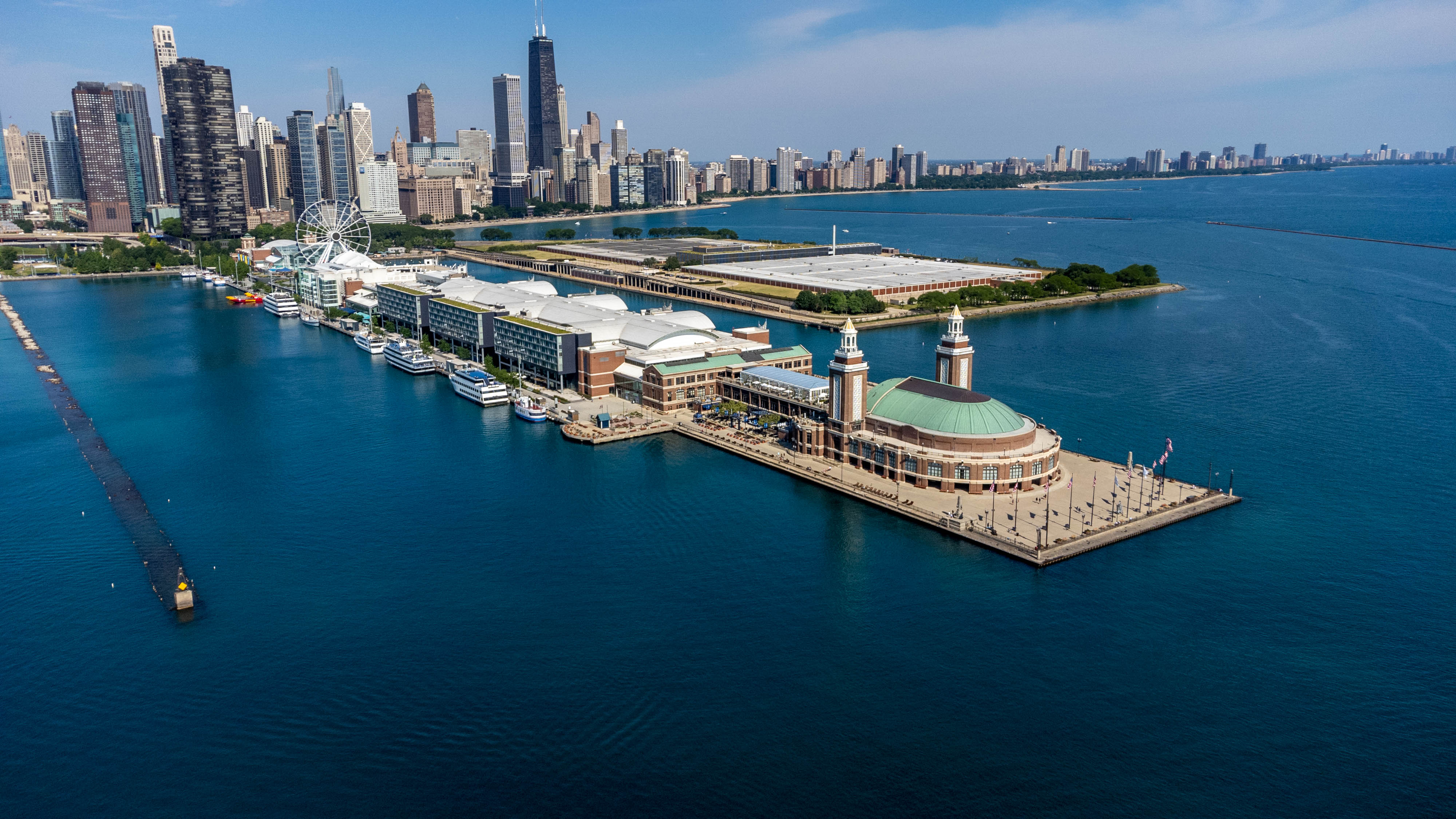
Navy Pier looking northwest in 2022

In 1959, the St. Lawrence Seaway opened and increased commercial shipping activity at the pier for a short time, though business died down and left for more modern facilities at Lake Calumet. In 1976, the East End buildings were renovated and for a brief period the pier was alive again, home to summer events like ChicagoFest. However, maintenance was not done and the pier went into decline.

In 1989, the City of Chicago had the Urban Land Institute (ULI) reimagine uses for the pier. The Metropolitan Pier and Exposition Authority (MPEA) was created; its responsibility was to manage and operate Navy Pier as well as McCormick Place. The MPEA undertook the redevelopment, incorporating some of ULI's recommendations. On July 12, 1995, Navy Pier was reopened to the public as a mixed-use venue incorporating retail, dining, entertainment and cultural spaces.

=== 21st century ===
Navy Pier logo as of 2008

Efforts to update Navy Pier for the 21st century began on January 13, 2006, when the Metropolitan Pier and Exposition Authority released a proposal for a major renovation of the pier, which included a monorail, a 260-foot (79 m) spokeless Ferris wheel, a roller coaster, floating hotel, and a water park with a Great Lakes theme. The plan would have included nearly double the current parking and a replacement theater with a greater capacity. At the time of the announcement, a price tag of $2 billion was announced.

Following the reorganization of the agency that runs Navy Pier and McCormick Place, a new study was commissioned to reinvigorate the upgrade process. The new study, by the Urban Land Institute, was released on November 11, 2010, and recommended a more modest set of enhancements aimed at retaining the pier's role as a public space, rather than turning it into a theme park. Suggested elements include a concert venue, an enlarged Chicago Shakespeare Theater space, new restaurants, a renovated commercial area around the pier's entrance and additional park-like features to bring people closer to the lake. Possibilities, including the enlarged Ferris wheel and a hotel, are mentioned as more remote possibilities.

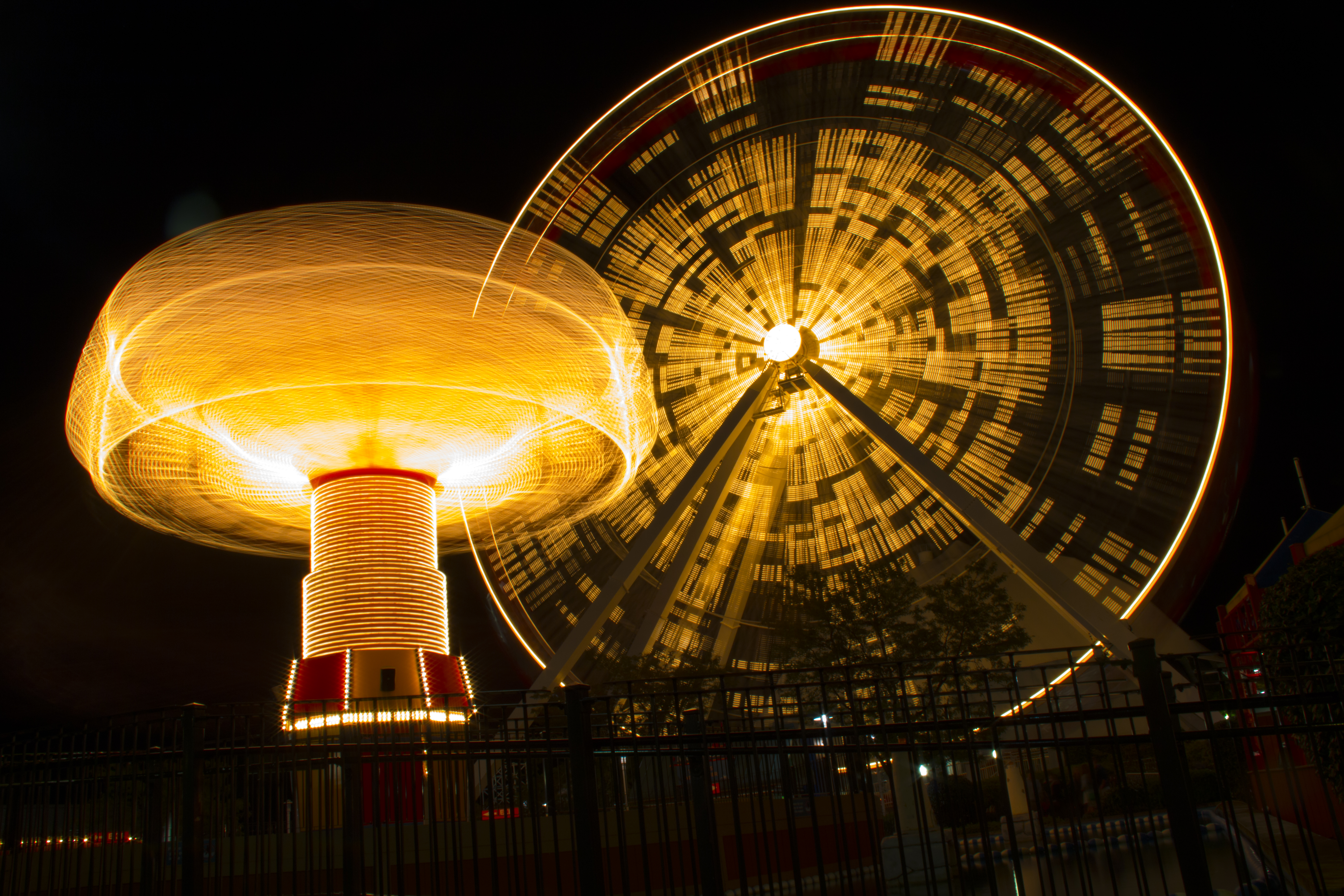
The iconic Navy Pier wheel, which was retired on September 27, 2015

In March 2012, a competition led to selection of a design concept presented by a team led by James Corner of James Corner Field Operations that focuses on the pier's role as a waterfront promenade. In 2013, the Authority announced plans to carry out the first elements of a streamlined version of that concept, with reworked streetscape and a wider pedestrian space, moving tour-boat moorings to improve the view from a new central stairway centered on the Ferris wheel. Work began on the redevelopment plan, called The Centennial Vision, during the winter of 2013–2014. The purpose of the plan is to fulfill the mission to keep Navy Pier as a world-class public space and to renovate the pier so it will have more evening and year-round entertainment and more compelling landscape and design features. The Polk Family Foundation (founded by Sol Polk) donated $20 million to the redevelopment effort; the park and fountain at the entrance to the pier was named the Polk Bros Park and Fountain. The park hosts concerts and screens films.

A new Ferris wheel for the pier was announced on June 23, 2015. It is 196 feet (60 m) tall, 46 feet (14 m) taller than its predecessor. Rides now last twelve minutes instead of seven and feature three revolutions. The new wheel has brighter lights and opened in May 2016.

The Centennial Vision's first phase was completed in summer 2016. Work included the redesign of the Pier's public spaces, known as Pierscape, and improvements to the interior of the Family Pavilion and South Arcade. Phase I projects included the transformation of South Dock into a more engaging, greener space, conversion of the South Arcade indoor walkway into a Chicago-themed food experience and creation of a lighted water fountain/ice skating rink in Polk Bros Park. In November 2016, Phase I development achieved Gold certification under the Sustainable SITES Initiative (SITES) rating system, based on its expanded green spaces, improved pedestrian access, energy efficiency, innovative storm water management, and use of recycled local materials.

Phase II projects include the development of a seven-story, 240-room hotel, adjacent to the south side of Festival Hall; marquee additions to the East End Plaza, including a proposed arched, elevated overlook walkway and reflective water feature; a Welcome Pavilion in the 13-acre Polk Bros Park with 4,000 square feet for guest services and programmatic space; a seasonal ice rink within the footprint of the Polk Bros Park's fountain and plaza; and a short-term, north-side boat docking facility for use by recreational boaters seasonally.

== Attractions ==
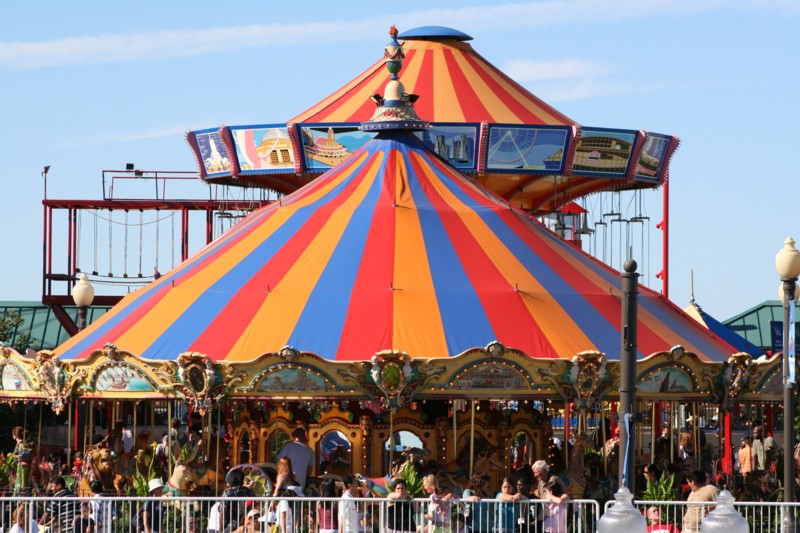
Musical carousel

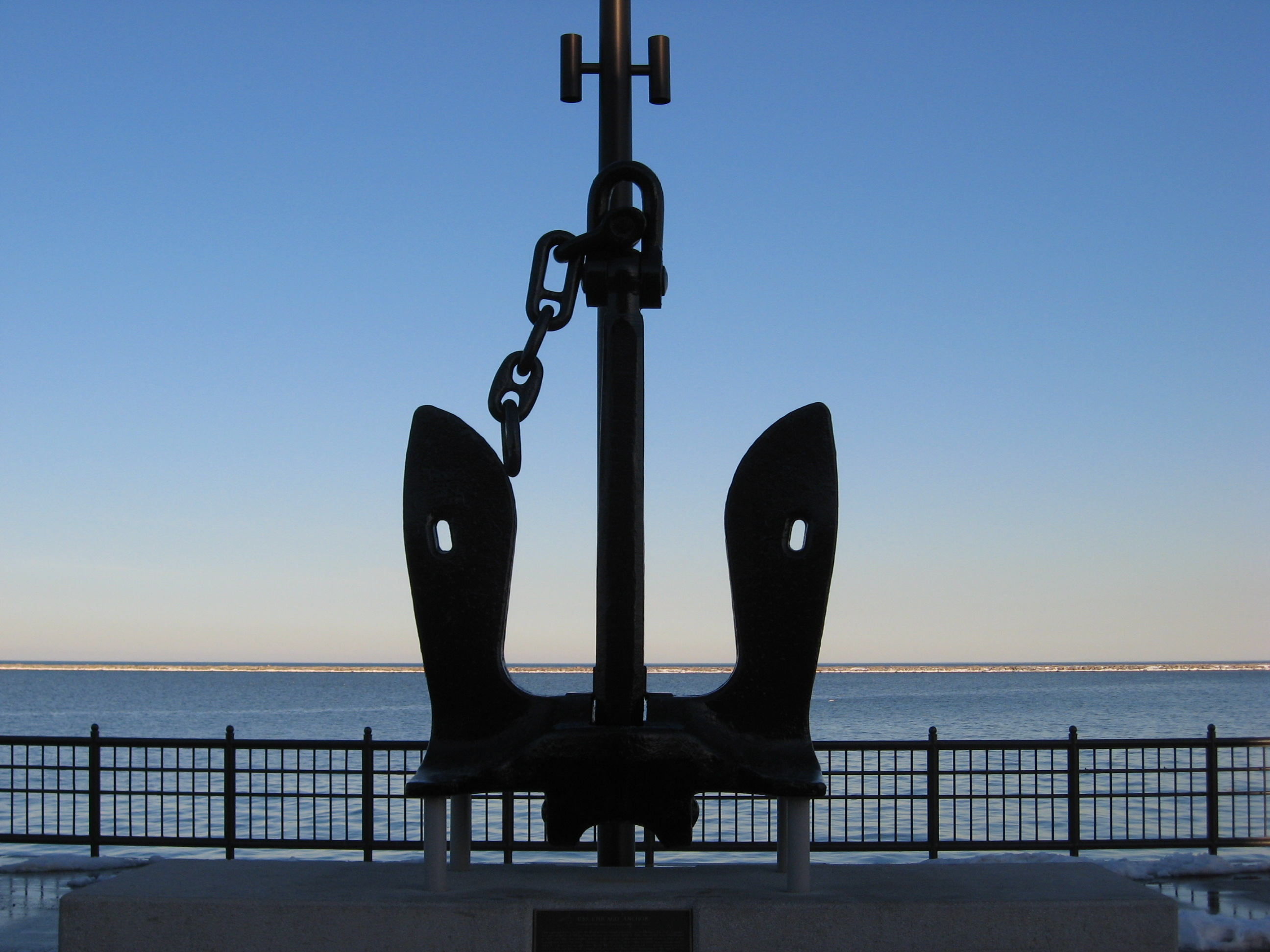
USS Chicago anchor

There are many outdoor attractions at the Navy Pier Park, such as the Pepsi Wave Swinger, Light Tower Ride, Remote Control Boats (now removed along with fountain around the Wave Swinger), Teacups and the Carousel. New for 2021 is Drop Tower, an S&S Double Shot relocated from the closed Pleasure Island.

Amazing Chicago's Funhouse Maze is on the pier. It is a self-paced, full-sensory maze experience where a person navigates their way through 4,000 square feet (370 m^{2}) of tunnels and mazes. Crystal Gardens is a one-acre, botanical garden inside the pier. It is a six-story glass atrium with a 50-foot (15 m) arched ceiling. Many schools come here for field-trips to see and experience the attraction.

The Chicago Children's Museum is a part of the pier, with many different exhibits and activities for both children and adults to enjoy. Chicago Shakespeare Theater, a theater that performs Shakespeare's productions, is located there.

The original Ferris wheel was sold on September 27, 2015, and moved to Branson, Missouri, where it opened in 2016. The new 196-foot (60 m) Ferris wheel which replaced it is a DW60 from Dutch Wheels, the Netherlands-based company that built the pier's former wheel. The state-of-the-art DW60 is the first of its kind in the U.S. with similar wheels currently in operation in Hong Kong and Baku, Azerbaijan. Significant features include two-sided cars that allow for easy loading and unloading, a fortified structure to withstand winds of 115 miles per hour (185 km/h) and safety glass capable of weathering intense storms. The new Ferris Wheel was unveiled on May 27, 2016.

Around April 2019, the pier’s original carousel that had operated since 1995 was dismantled and removed, after the original carousel’s mechanism broke due to cold weather in early 2019. Around late May into June, a new carousel was installed in the site of the original. This new carousel had previously operated at Dorney Park from 1986-2016 under the name Chance Carousel.

== Tenants ==
The Chicago Sun-Times has its headquarters in Navy Pier. WBEZ, affiliated with the newspaper, is the lessee of 45,000 square feet (4,200 m^{2}) of space, which has radio and newspaper functions.

== Events and art ==
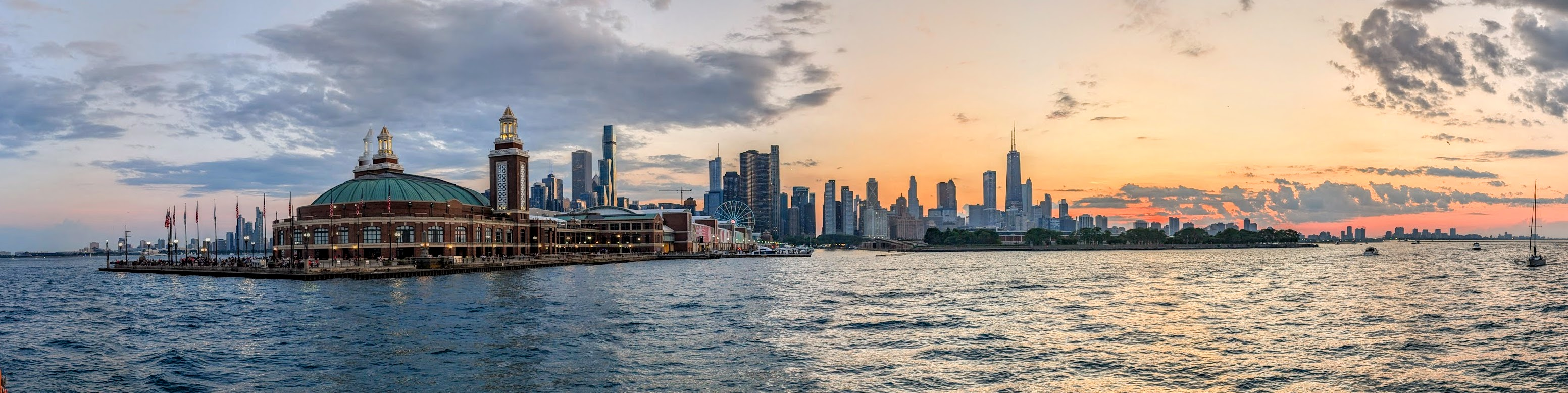
Panoramic sunset view of Navy Pier and Chicago's Near North Side skyline

Navy Pier hosts sightseeing tours from companies such as Seadog Ventures, Shoreline Sightseeing cruises and Water Taxi service, and the tall ship "Windy". There are also dinner cruises by Entertainment Cruises on their ships the Spirit of Chicago, Odyssey II, and Mystic Blue. The pier has fireworks on Wednesday and Saturday nights during the summer and Saturday nights during the fall.

Many outdoor art installations are displayed on the pier. The anchor from the naval vessel USS Chicago (CA-136/CG-11) is on display at the far end. Other installations include a statue of actor Bob Newhart at a desk, alongside a couch as seen on The Bob Newhart Show, the Captain on the Helm statue dedicated to maritime captains, and the Crack the Whip sculpture of eight children at play holding hands by J. Seward Johnson Jr.

The Festival Halls can be used for sporting events. Festival Halls A and B can be turned into a 170,000-square-foot (16,000 m^{2}) competition arena. Gymnastics meets have been held in the Festival Halls. The game show Wheel of Fortune taped episodes on the pier in 2002 and 2008.

== Bus routes ==
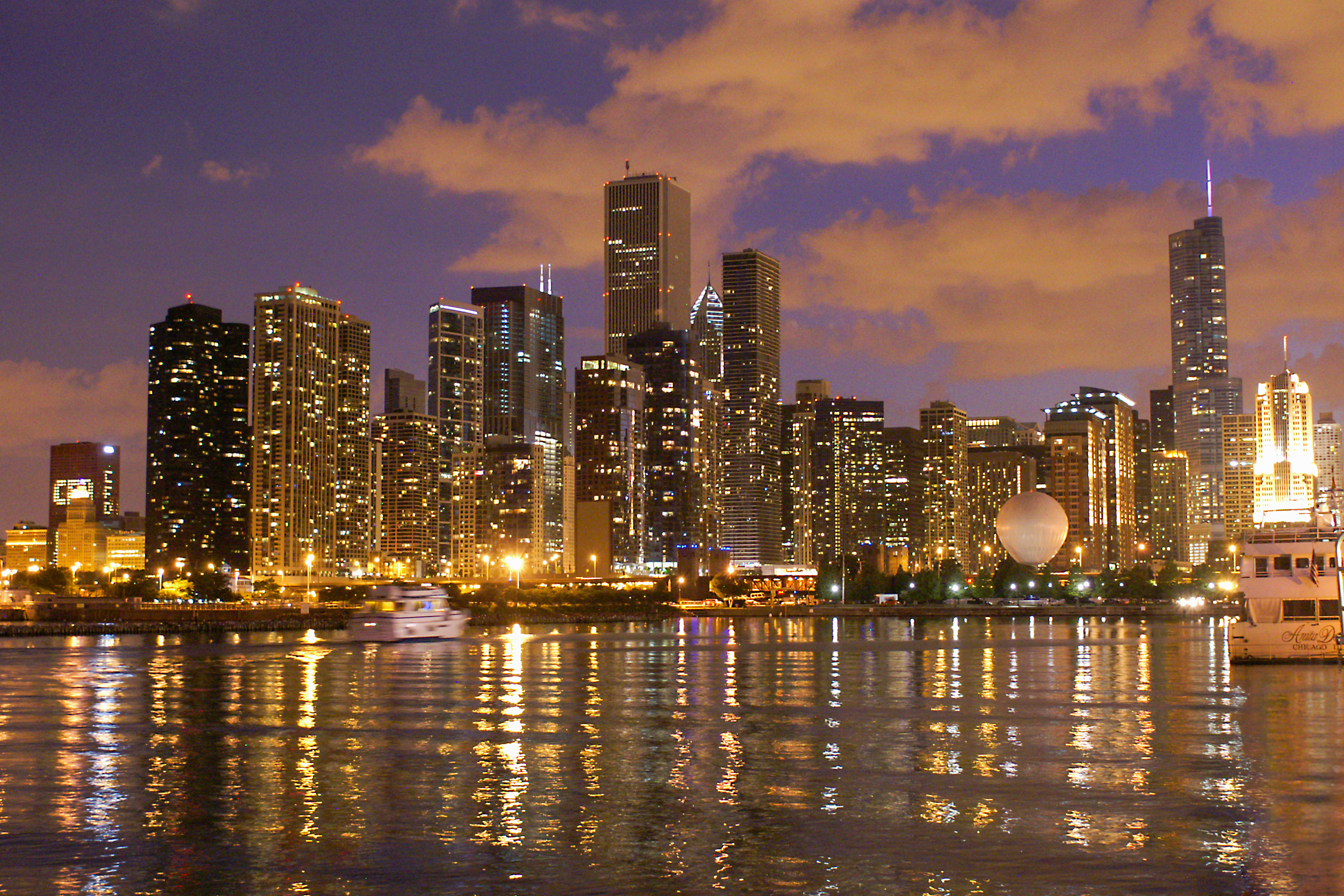
New Eastside from Navy Pier

CTA

- 2 Hyde Park Express (weekday rush hours only)
- 29 State
- 65 Grand
- 66 Chicago
- 124 Navy Pier

== In popular culture ==
The halls were used to represent Atlantic City, New Jersey, in the 1986 movie The Color of Money for the 9-Ball Championship.

In both Raw Deal and Cooley High, the pier was used as a location for car chases.

The fourth season finale of T. J. Hooker, titled "The Chicago Connection", featured a scene in front of the then-abandoned pier.

In the film Divergent, the pier and Ferris wheel are shown abandoned and decayed in a future Chicago and it is stated that they were abandoned by choice a long time before. The Dauntless members play capture the flag in the park. Tris and Four climb the Ferris wheel to spot the opposing team. In the book, the opposing team hides the flag in a park near Navy Pier, while in the film version, the flag is hidden in a tower of the Chicago Children's Museum building.

In the video game NASCAR 09, the pier is featured as a fictional race track.

The album/DVD A Long Day's Night by Blue Öyster Cult was recorded live at Navy Pier/Skyline Stage on June 21, 2002.

== See also ==
- Navy Pier Auditorium
- Smith Museum of Stained Glass Windows
- National Register of Historic Places listings in Central Chicago
