= Prvi splitski odred =

1972 film directed by Vojdrag Berčić

- Directed by: Vojdrag Bercic
- Written by: Vojdrag Bercic; Ratko Djurovic; Slavko Goldstein
- Starring: Toni Laurencic; Zarko Radic; Miha Baloh
- Production company: Adria Film
- Release date: 7 July 1972
- Running time: 1h 22m
- Country: Yugoslavia
- Language: Serbo-Croatian

Prvi splitski odred is a Croatian film directed by Vojdrag Berčić. It was released in 1972. It is based on true events from the very beginning of the Second World War in Dalmatia.
