= Krušvar, Croatia =

Settlement in Split-Dalmatia County, Croatia

Krušvar
- Settlement
- Interactive map of Krušvar
- Location of Krušvar in Croatia
- Coordinates: 43°36′40″N 16°38′46″E
- Country: Croatia
- County: Split-Dalmatia
- Municipality: Dicmo

Area
  - Total: 9.1 km^{2} (3.5 sq mi)

Population (2021)
  - Total: 457
  - Density: 50/km^{2} (130/sq mi)
- Time zone: UTC+1 (CET)
  - Summer (DST): UTC+2 (CEST)
- Postal code: 21232 Dicmo
- Area code: +385 (0)21

Krušvar is a settlement in the Municipality of Dicmo in Croatia. In 2021, its population was 457.

== History ==
Krušvar, also known as Dicmo Gornje, belonged to the single parish of Dicmo until 1752, when it became an independent parish. Until 1858, the parish was governed by the Franciscans from the Sinj monastery of the Franciscan Province of the Most Holy Redeemer, with an interruption from 1847 to 1852. Since then, the parish priests have been secular priests. The parish is part of the Deanery of Klis.

The village of Ercegovci, first settled by residents from Herzegovina at the end of the 17th century, that is on the opposite side of the karst field, belongs to the same parish.

== Demographics ==
Unlike many other villages in the Cetina region and Dalmatian hinterland, population is not decreasing. In 2016, it was reported that the primary school had about 30 students in grades 1 to 4.

Krušvar: Population trends 1857–2021
v

population	548	597	553	667	762	744	769	832	793	822	841	750	685	476	481	490	457
	1857	1869	1880	1890	1900	1910	1921	1931	1948	1953	1961	1971	1981	1991	2001	2011	2021

Sources: Croatian Bureau of Statistics publications

== Education ==
Krušvar had its own primary school since 1961. The newly constructed part of the building and the renovated old part were dedicated in 2017.

== Notable people ==
- Michael Anthony Bilandic, former Chicago mayor whose father Mate Bilandžić was an immigrant from Krušvar
