= Osoje, Tuzla =

Osoje
- Village
- Location within Bosnia and Herzegovina
- Coordinates: 44.6152466°N 18.5961944°E
- Country: Bosnia and Herzegovina
- Entity: Federation of Bosnia and Herzegovina
- Canton: Tuzla
- Municipality: Tuzla

Area
  - Total: 1.02 sq mi (2.64 km^{2})

Population (2013)
  - Total: 574
  - Density: 563/sq mi (217/km^{2})
- Time zone: UTC+1 (CET)
  - Summer (DST): UTC+2 (CEST)

Osoje is a village in the municipality of Tuzla, Tuzla Canton, Bosnia and Herzegovina.

== Demographics ==
According to the 2013 census, its population was 574.

Ethnicity in 2013
Ethnicity	Number	Percentage
Bosniaks	457	79.6%
Croats	80	13.9%
Serbs	2	0.3%
other/undeclared	35	6.1%
Total	574	100%
