= Dicmo =

- Municipality
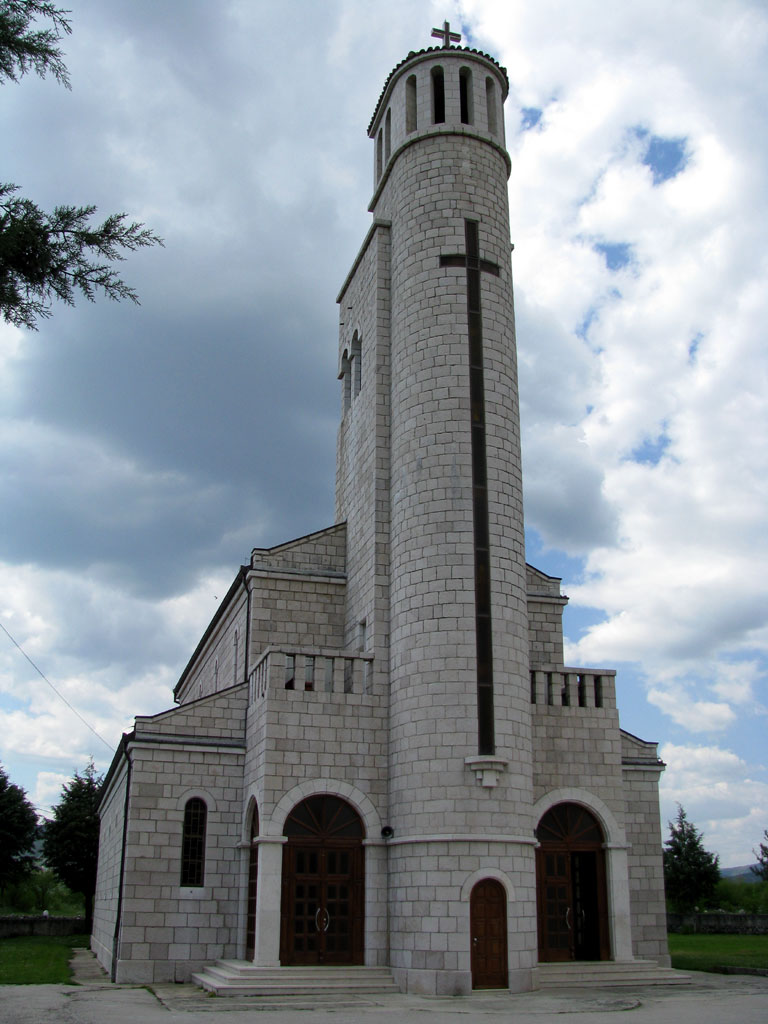

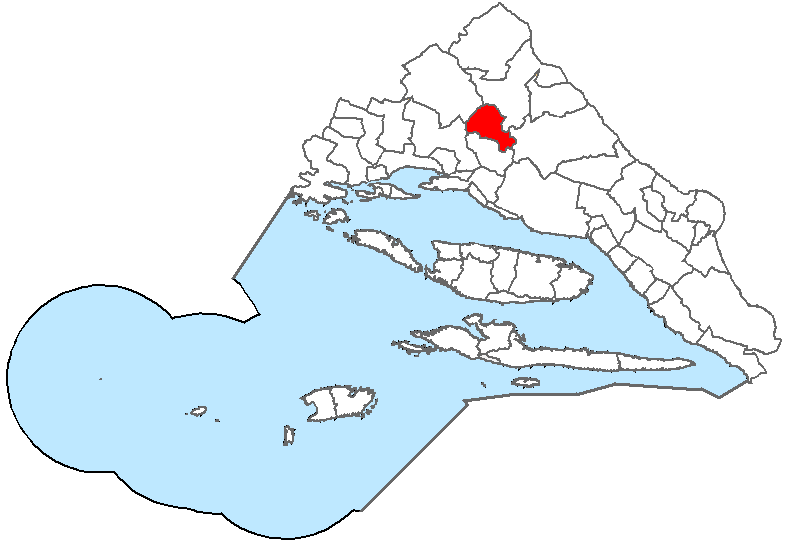

- Location within Croatia
- Coordinates: 43°38′N 16°35′E
- Country: Croatia
- Region: Dalmatian Hinterland
- County: Split-Dalmatia County

Area
  - Total: 69.0 km^{2} (26.6 sq mi)

Population (2021)
  - Total: 2,805
  - Density: 40.7/km^{2} (105/sq mi)
- Time zone: UTC+1 (CET)
  - Summer (DST): UTC+2 (CEST)
- Website: dicmo.hr

Dicmo is a municipality in Croatia in the Split-Dalmatia County.

== Population ==
In the 2011 census, it had a total population of 2,802, in the following settlements:

- Ercegovci, population 143
- Kraj, population 514
- Krušvar, population 490
- Osoje, population 388
- Prisoje, population 643
- Sičane, population 502
- Sušci, population 122

In the same census, 98% were Croats.

Dicmo: Population trends 1857–2021
v

population	2489	2715	2744	3066	3240	3522	3595	3797	3581	3783	3990	3668	3331	2840	2657	2802	2805
	1857	1869	1880	1890	1900	1910	1921	1931	1948	1953	1961	1971	1981	1991	2001	2011	2021

Sources: Croatian Bureau of Statistics publications

== Geography and history ==
Dicmo is a municipality made up of small villages located on the bottom of several foot-hills and edges of a stretched karst field, connected via the D1 road in the middle of the field, with Sinj 10 km to the north, A1 Motorway 7 km to the south and Split 20 km to the south-west.

Dicmo has been inhabited since the Ilyrian ages, but the first mentions of it and its name comes from the word "Decimanum", because it was the "tenth mile" on the ancient road between Salona and Aequum. Throughout its history, Dicmo has been a transit stop for both commercial and military reasons, and like the rest of today's Croatia, often changed administrations, due to both the Ottoman and Morean wars. During the Austro-Hungarian rule, a railway between Sinj and Split, "Rera", whose route passed through Dicmo is built. World War II came up and Dicmo was once again a transit route, this time for Italians and Germans on their path to Split, which allowed Italians to build a watchtower next to the local train station, the ruins of which can be seen to this day. At the beginning, there was a mix of sides, but after 1943, residents joined the fight against Axis powers. Notable WW2 event in the municipality took place in the Butige hamlet where several Ustaše soldiers were intercepted by Sinj partisans and eventually taken into Huso's pit (Husina jama), a mt. Kamešnica site where dozens of axis bodies were disposed. During the Yugoslav era, the area was under a former municipality of Sinj, during which the Rera railway was shut down, D1 road was built in the 1960s, while the electricity and the waterlines were installed in the 1970s and late 1980s, respectively. Many inhabitants of the municipality took part in the Croatian War of Independence, after which Dicmo became a part of Croatia and a municipality in the Split-Dalmatia county, with the HDZ (Croatian Democrat Party) as a local leading political party. Most notable investment during the 21st century, during the ruling of the independent political party, is the municipality's Industrial Zone, with over 500 people from the nearby region employed in it.

== Education ==
Osnovna škola Ante Starčevića Dicmo (Ante Starčević elementary school)

== Sports ==
MNK Spartak (Futsal Club Spartak)

== Notable people ==
- Michael Anthony Bilandic, former Chicago mayor whose parents were immigrants from Krušvar
- Ratko Rudić, waterpolo coach
- Ivan Grubišić, Catholic priest, politician, sociologist
- Bruno Silić, waterpolo coach
- Inoslav Bešker, journalist
