= Wallace D. Johnson =

Member of the Chicago Transit Authority Board
- In office 1970–1976
- Appointed by: Richard B. Ogilvie
- Preceded by: Raymond D. Peacock
- Succeeded by: Mathilda A. Jakubowski

Personal details
- Born: Etna Green, Indiana
- Died: December 1, 1994 Chicago, Illinois
- Party: Republican
- Education: Lake Forest College
- Profession: investment banker

Wallace D. Johnson was an American investment banker. In the 1970s, he served on the Chicago Transit Authority Board. He is credited with creating its Super Transfer and Culture Bus, and was involved in work to establish the Regional Transportation Authority. He was the Republican nominee for mayor of Chicago in 1979, losing the general election by a massive margin to Democratic nominee Jane Byrne. From 1990 until his death in 1994, Johnson was the executive director of the Children's Care Foundation.

== Early life and education ==
Johnson was born and raised in Etna Green, Indiana. He graduated from Lake Forest College. He would later serve as a trustee of his alma mater.

From 1944 through 1946, Johnson served in the United States Navy.

== Banking career ==
Johnson was a founder of the investment banking firm Howe, Barnes, & Johnson, which specialized in government bond and securities brokerage. He led the firm, serving as its president and retiring as its chairman in 1980.

Johnson served as the board chairman of the Chicago Association of Stock Exchange Firm.

== Government and private sector work on transportation ==
Johnson worked as an advisor to the Federal Railroad Administration. In this role, he was involved in managing the reorganization of a number of railroads. This included work on the reorganization of the Chicago & North Western Railway, for which he drafted a plan in 1955.

Johnson co-authored a plan to rehabilitate the New Haven Railroad, and worked as a financial advisor to the president of the South Shore Line.

In 1971, the United States Department of Transportation (USDOT) tasked Johnson with taking a five-nation tour of Europe to study the impact of mass transit on urban and suburban living in various cities. Johnson also served on the USDOT's High Speed Ground Transportation Advisory Committee.

From 1970 through 1976, Johnson was a member of the board of the Chicago Transit Authority (CTA). He was appointed to the position by Governor Richard B. Ogilvie. Johnson started the agency's Super Transfer and Culture Bus offerings. In 1973, he was involved in the preliminary work of establishing the Regional Transit Authority (RTA).

== 1979 mayoral campaign ==
Johnson was the Republican Party nominee for mayor of Chicago in 1979, losing to Democratic Party nominee Jane Byrne by a massive margin. Before this, he had for many years been a fundraiser for Republican mayoral candidates in Chicago. He considered running for mayor himself in the 1977 mayoral special election, but ultimately did not.

He was unanimously slated by the Cook County Republican Party ahead of the primary election.

As nominee, Johnson received little organizational assistance from the Republican Party. This is despite the fact that Governor Jim Thompson had promised financial support to his campaign if he ran for mayor.

== Later life and death ==
Johnson retired from his banking career in his later years. From 1990 until his death in 1994, Johnson was executive director of the Children's Care Foundation. The nonprofit, which was founded in 1891 as the Home for Destitute and Crippled Children, had spun-off from Wyler's Children Hospital in 1989.

Johnson died on December 1, 1994, at his residence along North Lake Shore Drive in Chicago.

== Personal life ==
Johnson was president of the Indiana Society of Chicago.

At the time of his death, Johnson had been a longtime romantic partners with Dr. Elva Poznanski.
