= Jane Byrne =

American politician (1933–2014)

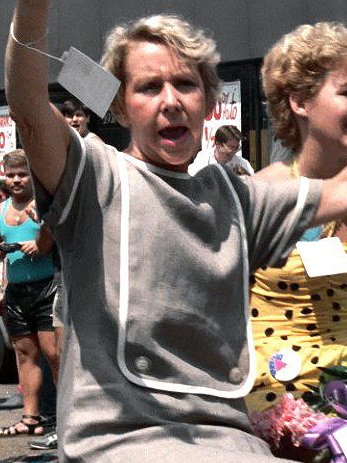
- Byrne in 1985

50th Mayor of Chicago
- In office April 16, 1979 – April 29, 1983
- Deputy: Richard Mell
- Preceded by: Michael Bilandic
- Succeeded by: Harold Washington

Personal details
- Born: Jane Margaret Burke; May 24, 1933 Chicago, Illinois, U.S.
- Died: November 14, 2014 (aged 81) Chicago, Illinois, U.S.
- Resting place: Calvary Catholic Cemetery
- Party: Democratic
- Spouses: William Byrne (m. 1956; died 1959) Jay McMullen (m. 1978; died 1992)
- Children: Kathy Byrne
- Education: Saint Mary-of-the-Woods College; Barat College (BS)

Jane Margaret Byrne (née Burke; May 24, 1933 – November 14, 2014) was an American politician who served as the 50th mayor of Chicago from April 16, 1979, until April 29, 1983. Prior to her tenure as mayor, Byrne served as Chicago's commissioner of consumer sales from 1969 until 1977 under Mayor Richard J. Daley, the only woman in the mayoral cabinet.

Byrne won the 1979 Chicago mayoral election on April 3, 1979 becoming the first female mayor of the city, and causing an upheaval in beating the city's political machine. She was the first woman to be elected mayor of a major city in the United States, as Chicago was the second largest city in the United States at the time.

Byrne narrowly lost her bid for renomination in the Democratic primary for the 1983 Chicago mayoral election, in which she faced a long-expected challenge from Richard J. Daley's son Richard M. Daley, with both Byrne and Daley losing to Harold Washington in an upset. Washington won the general election. Byrne unsuccessfully challenged Washington for the nomination in 1987, but endorsed his re-election in the general election. Byrne made one last unsuccessful bid for the Democratic mayoral nomination in 1991, challenging Richard M. Daley (who had become mayor in a special election two years earlier).

== Early life and career ==
Byrne was born Jane Margaret Burke on May 24, 1933, at John B. Murphy Hospital in the Lake View neighborhood on the north side of Chicago, Illinois, to Katherine Marie Burke (née Nolan), a housewife, and William Patrick Burke, vice president of Inland Steel. Raised on the city's north side, Byrne graduated from Saint Scholastica High School and attended Saint Mary-of-the-Woods College for her first year of college. Byrne later transferred to Barat College, where she graduated with a bachelor's degree in chemistry and biology in 1955.

Byrne entered politics to volunteer in John F. Kennedy's campaign for president in 1960. During that campaign she first met then Chicago Mayor Richard J. Daley. After Daley met Byrne, he appointed her to several positions, beginning in 1964 with a job in a city anti-poverty program In June 1965, she was promoted to working with the Chicago Committee of Urban Opportunity.

In 1968, Byrne was appointed head of the City of Chicago's consumer affairs department. She served as a delegate to the 1972 Democratic National Convention (DNC) and chairperson of the DNC resolutions committee in 1973. In 1975, Byrne was appointed co-chairperson of the Cook County Democratic Central Committee by Daley, over the objection of a majority of Democratic leaders. The committee ousted Byrne shortly after Daley's death in late 1976. Shortly thereafter, Byrne accused the newly appointed mayor Michael Bilandic of being unfair to citizens of the city by approving an increase in regulated taxi fares, which Byrne charged was the result of a "backroom deal". Byrne was then dismissed from her post as head of consumer affairs by Bilandic.

== Mayor of Chicago (1979–1983) ==
=== 1979 election ===
Months after being fired as head of the consumer affairs department, Byrne challenged Bilandic in the 1979 Democratic mayoral primary, the real contest in the heavily Democratic Chicago. Officially announcing her mayoral campaign in August 1977, Byrne partnered with Chicago journalist and political consultant Don Rose, who served as her campaign manager. At first, political observers believed she had little chance of winning. A memorandum inside the Bilandic campaign said it should portray her as "a shrill, charging, vindictive person—and nothing makes a woman look worse".

Nevertheless, the January Chicago Blizzard of 1979 paralyzed the city and caused Bilandic to be seen as an ineffective leader. Bilandic's ineffective leadership caused Jesse Jackson to endorse Byrne. Even many Republican voters voted in the Democratic primary to help beat Bilandic. Infuriated voters on the North Side and Northwest Side retaliated against Bilandic for the Democratic Party's slating of only South Side candidates for the mayor, clerk, and treasurer (the outgoing city clerk, John C. Marcin, was from the Northwest Side). These four factors combined to give Byrne a 51% to 49% victory over Bilandic in the primary. Byrne outperformed Bilandic in more than half of wards. She performed particularly strongly in Black-majority wards, which she swept.

Positioning herself as a reformer, Byrne won the general election with 82.1% of the vote, which remains the largest vote share any candidate has won in a Chicago mayoral election.

While Byrne had run against the Democratic political machine's candidate (Bilandic) in the primary, and her win over him harmed the machine's reputation for electoral strength, she had not run on any promise of eliminating the machine once mayor. The New York Times noted shortly after her primary election victory of Bilandic,

Despite the threat her victory posed to the reputation and perhaps even the continued existence of the machine, which has controlled City Hall since 1931, Mrs. Byrne, a loyal disciple of Mayor Daley, has shown little appetite for dismantling the organization he proudly headed for two decades.

=== Tenure ===
==== Leadership and general politics ====
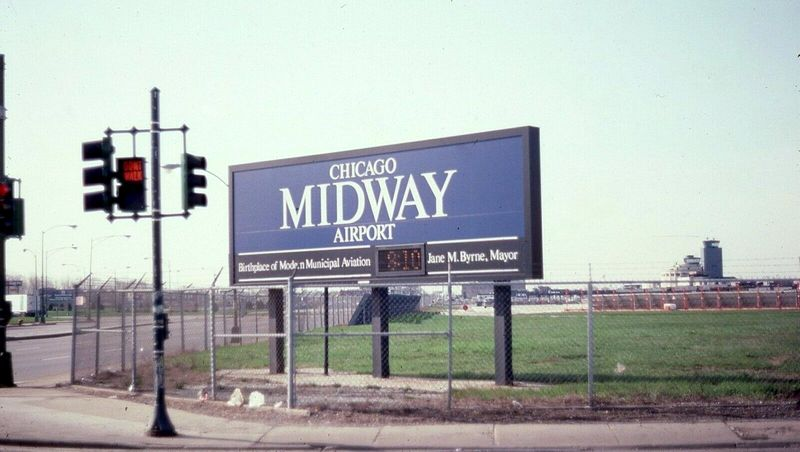
Early 1980s sign at Midway Airport listing Byrne as the city's mayor

Byrne made inclusive moves as mayor such as shepherding the hiring of the city's first African-American and female school superintendent Ruth B. Love, and she was the first mayor to recognize the gay community. Byrne helped to make Chicago more welcoming to the gay community. She ended the police department's practice of raiding gay bars, and declared the city's first official "Gay Pride Parade Day" in 1981. However, during her tenure, Byrne drifted away from many of the progressive tenets she had campaigned on. Byrne began to collaborate with aldermen Edward M. Burke and Edward Vrdolyak, whom, during her 1979 campaign, she had denounced as an "evil cabal".

In 1982, she supported the Cook County Democratic Party's replacement of its chairman, County Board President George Dunne, with her city council ally, Alderman Edward Vrdolyak.

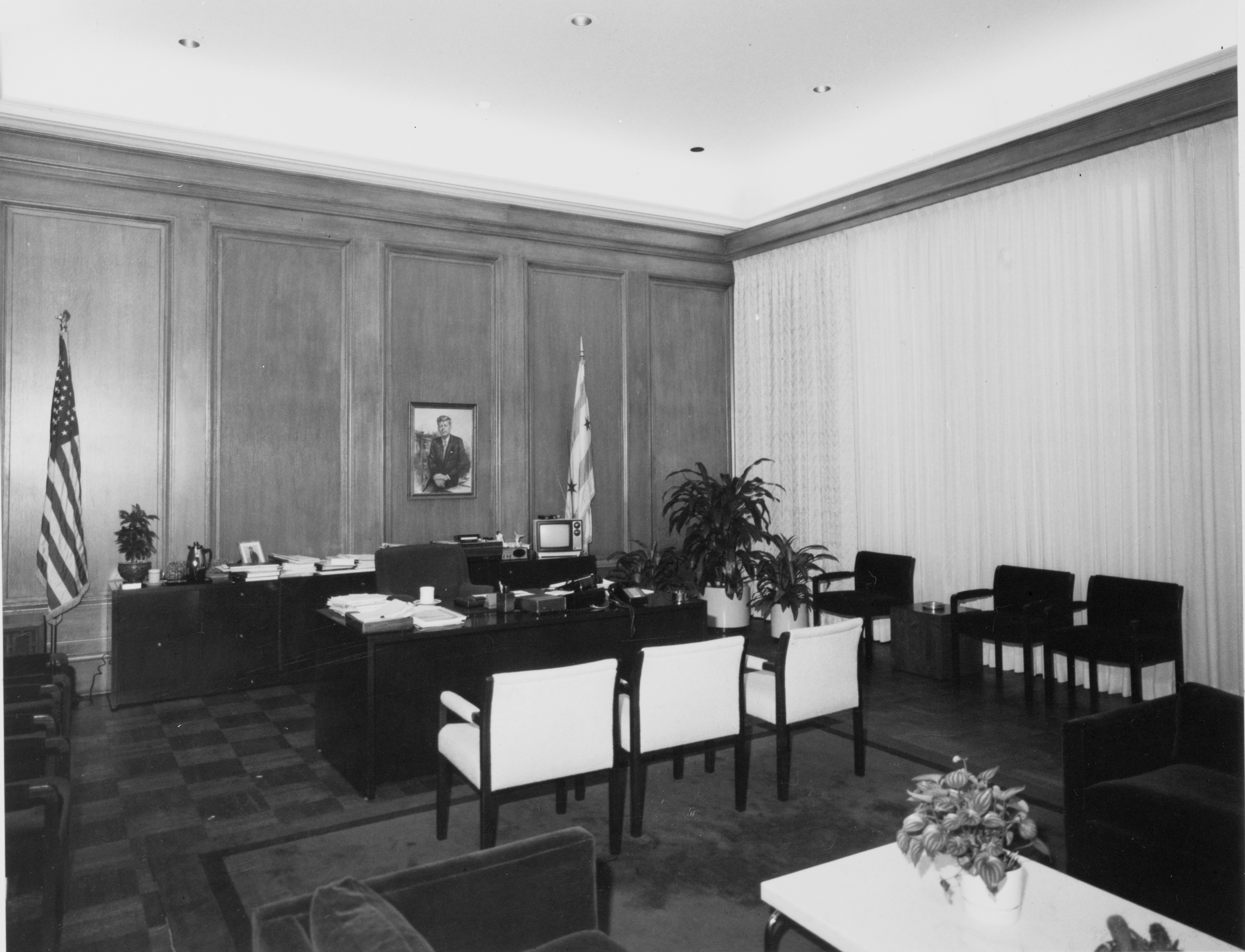
Byrne's mayoral office at the City Hall-County Building, photographed circa 1981

Byrne and the Cook County Democratic Party endorsed Senator Ted Kennedy for president in the 1980 Democratic presidential primaries, but incumbent President Jimmy Carter won the Illinois Democratic Primary and even carried Cook County and the city of Chicago. Byrne's endorsement of Kennedy was later considered detrimental because of her controversial tenure, and Kennedy's loss in the city was a key moment in the 1980 Democratic Party presidential primaries because of Chicago's role in delivering his brother John F. Kennedy the 1960 Democratic presidential nomination. When Byrne and Kennedy walked in the annual Saint Patrick's Day parade they were sometimes booed by hecklers.

Simultaneously, Byrne and the Cook County Democratic Party's candidate in the 1980 election for Cook County State's Attorney (chief local prosecutor), 14th Ward Alderman Edward M. Burke, lost in the Democratic primary to Richard M. Daley, and Daley then unseated GOP incumbent Bernard Carey in the general election.

The Chicago Sun Times reported that Byrne's enemies publicly mocked her as "that crazy broad" and "that skinny bitch" and worse.

==== Appointments and personnel ====
In her first year in office, significant instances of turnover in prominent city positions led critics to accuse Byrne of running a "revolving door administration".

While Byrne initially made inclusive moves with regards to appointments as mayor: shepherding the hiring of the city's first African-American and female school superintendent Ruth B. Love which she later pivoted away from this. Among the later steps that Byrne took that upset many of the progressives and Blacks that had supported her in the 1979 mayoral campaign was replacing Black members of the Chicago Board of Education and Chicago Housing Authority board with White members, some of whom even held stances that critics viewed as racist.

During the 1979 mayoral election, Byrne pledged to fire Superintendent of the Chicago Police Department James E. O'Grady, accusing him of having "politicized" the department. Days after her inauguration, O'Grady resigned. Later that year, she relieved interim superintendent Joseph DiLeonardi of command. She appointed Samuel Nolan interim superintendent in his place, Nolan was the first African American to serve as head of the Chicago Police Department. In January 1980, Richard J. Brzeczek took office as permanent superintendent, having been appointed by Byrne. On her last day in office, after the resignation of Brzeczek as superintdendent, Byrne appointed James E. O'Grady as interim superintendent. By this time, Byrne had rescinded her past criticisms of O'Grady. In 1980, Byrne appointed William R. Blair as Chicago fire commissioner.

==== Arts ====
During her campaign for mayor, Byrne promised to provide strong support to the performing arts. Chicago Tribune art critic, Richard Christiansen, hailed Byrne for having made, "the arts and amusements of the city a most significant part of her" mayoral administration.

As mayor, she provided $200,000 to the Lyric Opera of Chicago for the express purposes of providing family-friendly entertainment. She provided a similar amount to Auditorium Theatre for them to acquire a new lighting board. As mayor, Byrne provided for the city to partially fund the construction of the Miró's Chicago sculpture by artist Joan Miró. Byrne also allowed Chicago to be used as a filming location, pushing for such movies as The Blues Brothers to be shot in Chicago.

==== Cabrini–Green ====
On March 26, 1981, Byrne decided to move into the crime-ridden Cabrini–Green Homes housing project on the near-north side of Chicago after 37 shootings resulting in 11 murders occurring during a three-month period from January to March 1981. In her 2004 memoir, Byrne reflected on her decision to move into Cabrini–Green: "How could I put Cabrini on a bigger map? ... Suddenly I knew—I could move in there." Prior to her move to Cabrini, Byrne closed down several liquor stores in the area, citing the stores as hangout for gangs and murderers. Byrne also ordered the Chicago Housing Authority to evict tenants who were suspected of harboring gang members in their apartments, which affected approximately 800 tenants.

Byrne moved into a 4th floor apartment in a Cabrini extension building on North Sedgwick Avenue with her husband on March 31 around 8:30 p.m. after attending a dinner at the Conrad Hilton hotel. Hours after Byrne moved into the housing project, police raided the building and arrested eleven street gang members who they had learned through informants were planning to have a shootout in the mayor's building later that evening.

Byrne described her first night at Cabrini-Green as "lovely" and "very quiet". She stayed at Cabrini-Green for three weeks to bring attention to the housing project's crime and infrastructure problems. Her stay there ended on April 18, 1981, following an Easter celebration at the project which drew protests and demonstrators who claimed Byrne's move to the project was just a publicity stunt.

==== Finances ====
One of the crises that Byrne faced in her first year as mayor was a major shortage of funds in both the municipal government and by the Chicago Board of Education (the city's school board). This arose due to questionable past borrowing practices, and necessitated both budget cuts and further borrowing to resolve.

==== Handgun ordinance ====
In January 1982, Byrne proposed a controversial ordinance effectively banning new handgun registration. The ordinance was created to put a freeze on the number of legally owned handguns in Chicago and to require owners of handguns to re-register them annually. The ordinance was approved by a 6–1 vote in February 1982. The ordinance was struck down by the Supreme Court in the 2010 case McDonald v. City of Chicago.

==== Hosting of special events ====
Byrne also used special events, such as ChicagoFest, to revitalize Navy Pier and the downtown Chicago Theatre. ChicagoFest had first been held the year prior to her election. One of Byrne's first efforts as mayor had been an attempt to cancel future editions of the event. But, after facing complaints from citizens and unions, Byrne allowed the festival to continue as an annual event, and formally renamed it "Mayor Jane M. Byrne's ChicagoFest".

Festivals inaugurated during her tenure included Taste of Chicago. Byrne held a number of smaller-scale events in neighborhoods all across the city, wording them with the prefix "Mayor Byrne's". As mayor, Byrne was a strong supporter of the planned Chicago 1992 World's Fair. In 1980, Byrne announced that the city would host a Championship Auto Racing Teams "Indy Car" automobile race at Grant Park on the 4th of July weekend of the following year. However, after facing criticism, Byrne quickly canceled these plans.

==== Labor ====
In her first year in office, she faced strikes by labor unions as the city's transit workers, public school teachers, and firefighters all went on strike.

==== Transportation ====
There had been plans under Daley and Bilandic to demolish the Loop elevated rail and replace it with a subway. Byrne appointed a commission that ultimately recommended that the Loop should be retained along with modernization. In 1981, Byrne disbanded the Chicago Transit Authority's dedicated security force, transferring its duties instead to the Chicago Police Department.

==== Other matters ====
In November 1981, the Chicago City Council approved a new redistricting map for the city's aldermanic wards which was drawn by Byrne's administration. The U.S. Court of Appeals would find, in 1984, that the map was in violation of the federal Voting Rights Act of 1965.

On November 11, 1981, Dan Goodwin, who had successfully climbed the Sears Tower the previous spring, battled for his life on the side of the John Hancock Center. William Blair, Chicago's fire commissioner, had ordered the Chicago Fire Department to stop Goodwin by directing a full-power fire hose at him and by using fire axes to break window glass in Goodwin's path.

Mayor Byrne rushed to the scene and ordered the fire department to stand down. Then, through a smashed out a 38th floor window, Byrne told Goodwin, who was hanging from the building's side a floor below, that though she did not agree with his climbing of the John Hancock Center, she certainly opposed the fire department knocking him to the ground below. Byrne then allowed Goodwin to continue his climb unimpeded to the top.

Byrne also initiated the idea for creating a unified lakefront museum campus, which was implemented subsequent to her tenure as Museum Campus, as well as the idea of renovating Navy Pier, also implemented subsequent to her tenure. Byrne additionally expanded O'Hare International Airport.

=== Bid for reelection ===
In August 1982, Byrne decided that she would seek a second term as mayor. At the beginning of her re-election campaign, she was trailing behind Richard M. Daley, then Cook County State's Attorney, by 3% in a poll done by the Chicago Tribune in July 1982. Compared to the 1979 mayoral election in which Byrne received 59.3% of the African-American vote, Byrne had lost half of that vote. Byrne was defeated in the 1983 Democratic primary for mayor by Harold Washington, also an anti-machine politician and African-American congressman; the younger Daley ran a close third. Washington won the Democratic primary with just 36% of the vote; Byrne had 33%. Washington went on to win the general election.

=== Assessments ===
A 1993 survey of historians, political scientists and urban experts conducted by Melvin G. Holli of the University of Illinois at Chicago saw Byrne ranked as the tenth-worst American big-city mayor to serve between the years 1820 and 1993. When the survey was limited only to mayors that were in office post-1960, the results saw Byrne ranked the fourth-worst.

== Later career ==
Byrne ran against Washington again in the 1987 Democratic primary, but was defeated. She endorsed Washington for the general election, in which he defeated two Democrats running under other parties' banners (Edward Vrdolyak and Thomas Hynes) and a Republican.

Early into her 1987 campaign, in October 1985, Byrne called for a feasibility study of the potential to construct a third major airport for the city on the site of the South Works. Soon after, Governor James R. Thompson endorsed the idea of immediately planning for a third major airport to serve Chicago. This would be one of the impetuses of decades-long discussions and studies for a third major airport for the city, including the proposed Chicago south suburban airport.

Byrne next ran in the 1988 Democratic primary for Cook County Circuit Court Clerk. She faced the Democratic Party's slated candidate, Aurelia Pucinski (who was endorsed by Mayor Washington and is the daughter of then-Alderman Roman Pucinski). Pucinski defeated Byrne in the primary and Vrdolyak, by then a Republican, in the general election. Byrne's fourth run for mayor became a rematch with Daley in the 1991 primary. She received only 5.9 percent of the vote, a distant third behind Daley and Alderman Danny K. Davis.

== Personal life ==
In 1956, she married William P. Byrne, a U.S. Marine pilot. The couple had a daughter, Katherine C. Byrne (1957-2024). On May 31, 1959, while flying from Marine Corps Air Station Cherry Point to Naval Air Station Glenview in a Skyraider, Lt. Byrne attempted to land in a dense fog. After being waved off for landing twice, his plane's wing struck the porch of a nearby house and the plane crashed into Sunset Memorial Park, killing him.

Byrne married journalist Jay McMullen in 1978, and they remained married until his death from lung cancer in 1992. Byrne lived in the same apartment building from the 1970s until her death in 2014. She has one grandchild, Willie. Her daughter, Kathy, who died in 2024, was a lawyer with a Chicago firm. Mayor Byrne's book, My Chicago (1992), covers her life through her political career. In 2011, Byrne attended the inauguration of the city's then new mayor, Rahm Emanuel.

== Death and legacy ==
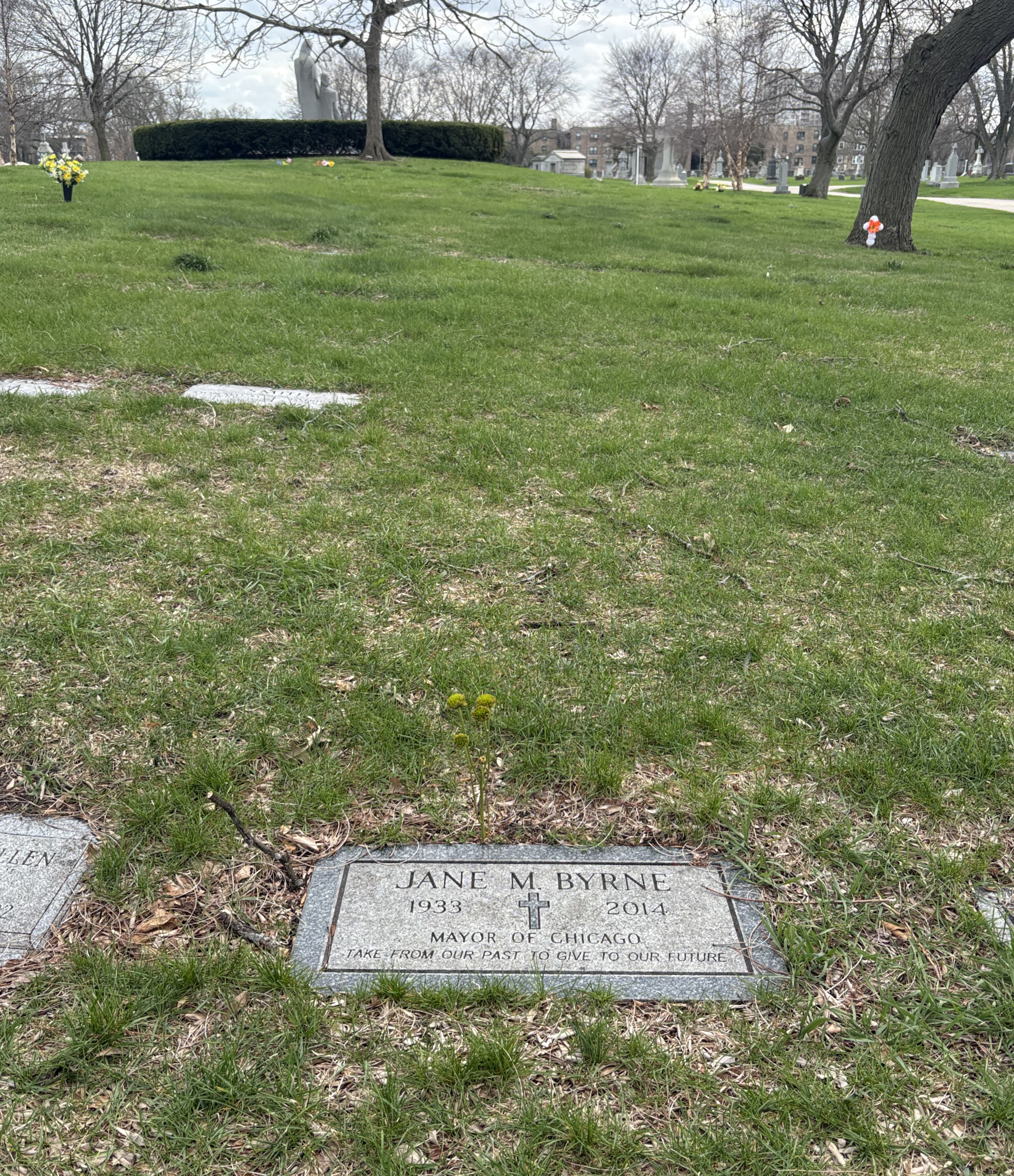
Byrne's grave at Calvary Cemetery

In 2006, a near decade before she died, Sufjan Stevens, a midwest native, released an instrumental song titled "Inaugural Pop Music for Jane Margaret Byrne". Stevens the year prior released an album titled and about Illinois to great acclaim. The song came out on the subsequent outtakes album, The Avalanche.

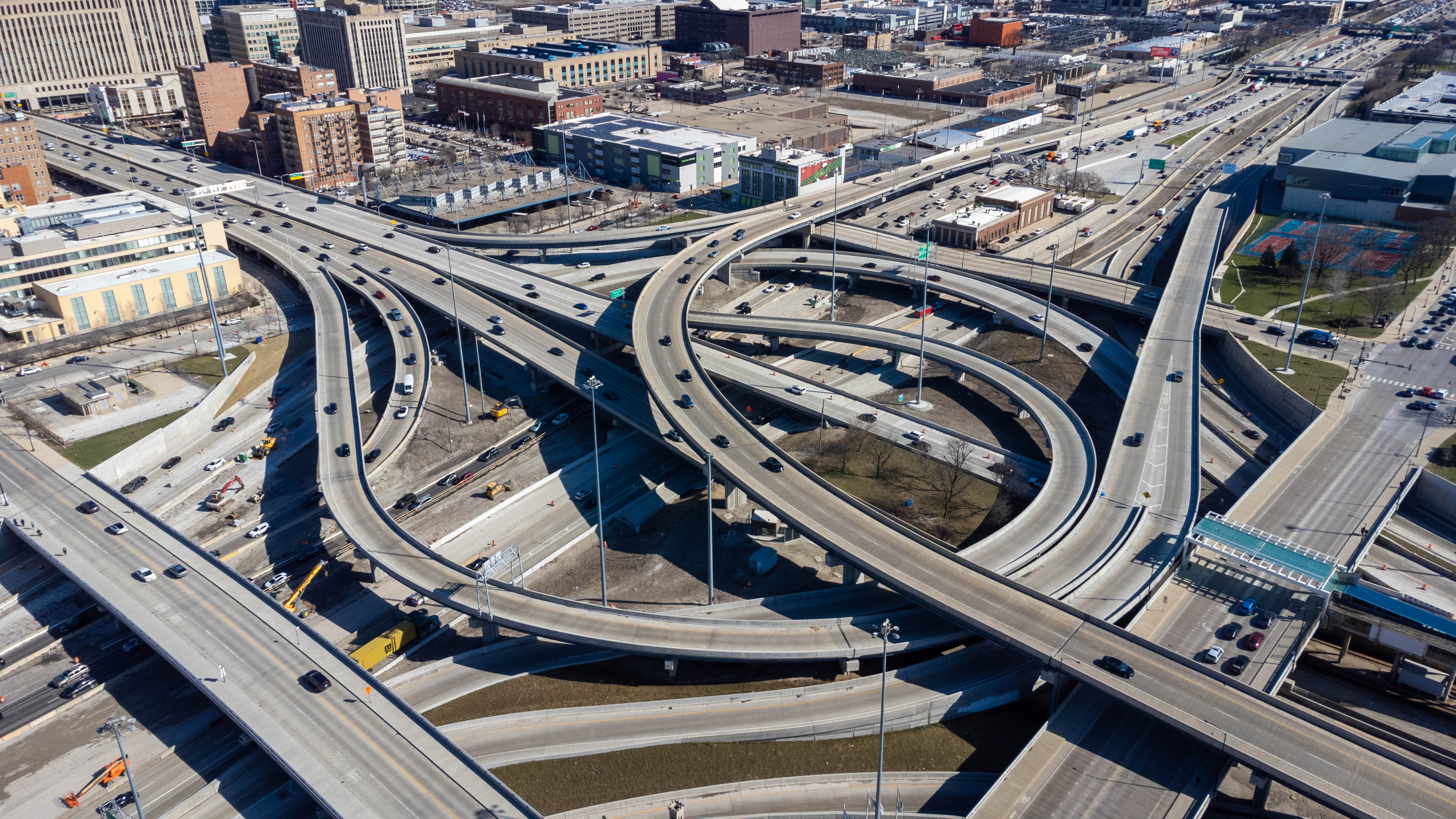
Jane M. Byrne Interchange

Byrne, a chain-smoker, had entered hospice care and died on November 14, 2014, in Chicago, aged 81, from complications of a stroke she suffered in January 2013. She was survived by her daughter Katherine and her grandson Willie. Her funeral Mass was held at St. Vincent de Paul Church on Monday, November 17, 2014. She is buried at Calvary Catholic Cemetery in Evanston, Illinois.

In July 2014, the Chicago City Council voted to rename the plaza surrounding the historic Chicago Water Tower on North Michigan Avenue the Jane M. Byrne Plaza in her honor. In a dedication ceremony held on August 29, 2014, Illinois Governor Pat Quinn renamed the Circle Interchange in Chicago the "Jane Byrne Interchange".

Byrne was also known for coining the malapropism "fruitworthy".

== Electoral history ==
=== Mayoral ===
1979

1979 Chicago mayoral Democratic primary
Candidate	Votes	%
Jane Byrne	412,909	51.04
Michael A. Bilandic (incumbent)	396,194	48.96
Turnout	809,043	

1979 Chicago mayoral election
Party	Candidate	Votes	%
Democratic	Jane Byrne	700,874	82.05
Republican	Wallace D. Johnson	137,663	16.12
Socialist Workers	Andrew Pulley	15,625	1.83
Turnout		854,162	61

1983

1983 Chicago mayoral Democratic primary
Candidate	Votes	%
Harold Washington	424,324	36.28
Jane Byrne (incumbent)	393,500	33.64
Richard M. Daley	346,835	29.65
Frank R. Ranallo	2,367	0.20
William Markowski	1,412	0.12
Sheila Jones	1,285	0.11
Turnout	1,169,723	

1987

1987 Chicago mayoral Democratic primary
Candidate	Votes	%
Harold Washington (incumbent)	586,841	53.50
Jane Byrne	507,603	46.27
Sheila Jones	2,549	0.23
Turnout	1,096,993	

1991

1991 Chicago mayoral Democratic primary
Party	Candidate	Votes	%
Democratic	Richard M. Daley (incumbent)	408,418	69.47
Democratic	Danny K. Davis	199,408	33.92
Democratic	Jane M. Byrne	38,216	6.50
Democratic	Sheila A. Jones	2,146	0.37
Turnout		587,923	

=== Clerk of the Circuit Court of Cook County ===
1988 Clerk of the Circuit Court of Cook County Democratic primary
Party	Candidate	Votes	%
Democratic	Aurelia Marie Pucinski	407,958	51.96
Democratic	Jane M. Byrne	296,298	37.74
Democratic	Thomas S. Fuller	60,863	7.75
Democratic	Janice A. Hart	20,061	2.55
Turnout		785,180	28.97

Political offices
Preceded by Michael Bilandic	Mayor of Chicago; April 16, 1979 – April 29, 1983	Succeeded by Harold Washington
