= Etna Township =

Etna Township may refer to the following townships in the United States:

- Etna Township, Kosciusko County, Indiana
- Etna Township, Licking County, Ohio

== See also ==
- Etna-Troy Township, Whitley County, Indiana
