= Kathy Byrne =

American lawyer (1957–2024)

- Born: Katherine Crane Byrne; December 31, 1957
- Died: August 8, 2024 (aged 66); Chicago, Illinois, U.S.
- Education: Saint Mary's College; Loyola University Chicago
- Occupation: Lawyer
- Years active: 1988–2024
- Children: 1
- Parent(s): Jane Byrne (mother); Jay McMullen (stepfather)

Katherine Crane Byrne (December 31, 1957 – August 8, 2024) was an American lawyer. She worked at a Chicago-based law firm, became involved in politics, and president of the Illinois Trial Lawyers Association.

== Life and career ==
Byrne was born on December 31, 1957, to William and Jane Byrne. Her mother later became a politician and her father was a marine pilot who died in a crash en route to Naval Air Station Glenview when she was eighteen months old. She was raised in Sauganash, Chicago where she lived with her mother and grandparents. Byrne was an editor of her high school newspaper and initially wanted to be a political journalist. She earned a bachelor's degree in political science at Saint Mary's College. Her mother later remarried to political journalist Jay McMullen. In October 1978, she was hired through her mother, who by then was mayor of Chicago, to work in a public relations job at the Chicago Transit Authority making US$17,500 (equivalent to $75,817 in 2024). She left the position after ten months. Byrne completed a law degree from Loyola University Chicago School of Law in 1988.

Byrne joined Cooney & Conway as a law clerk on the day she passed the Illinois Bar Examination in 1988. She worked there as a trial attorney for over 35 years. Byrne specialized in asbestos law. She co-chaired Susana Mendoza's campaign during the 2019 Chicago mayoral election. She fundraised for Joe Biden's 2020 and 2024 presidential campaigns. On June 9, 2023, Byrne became the second woman to serve as president of the Illinois Trial Lawyers Association.

Byrne died of lung cancer at the Rush University Medical Center, on August 8, 2024, at the age of 66.
