= 1980 United States presidential election in Kentucky =

- November 4, 1980

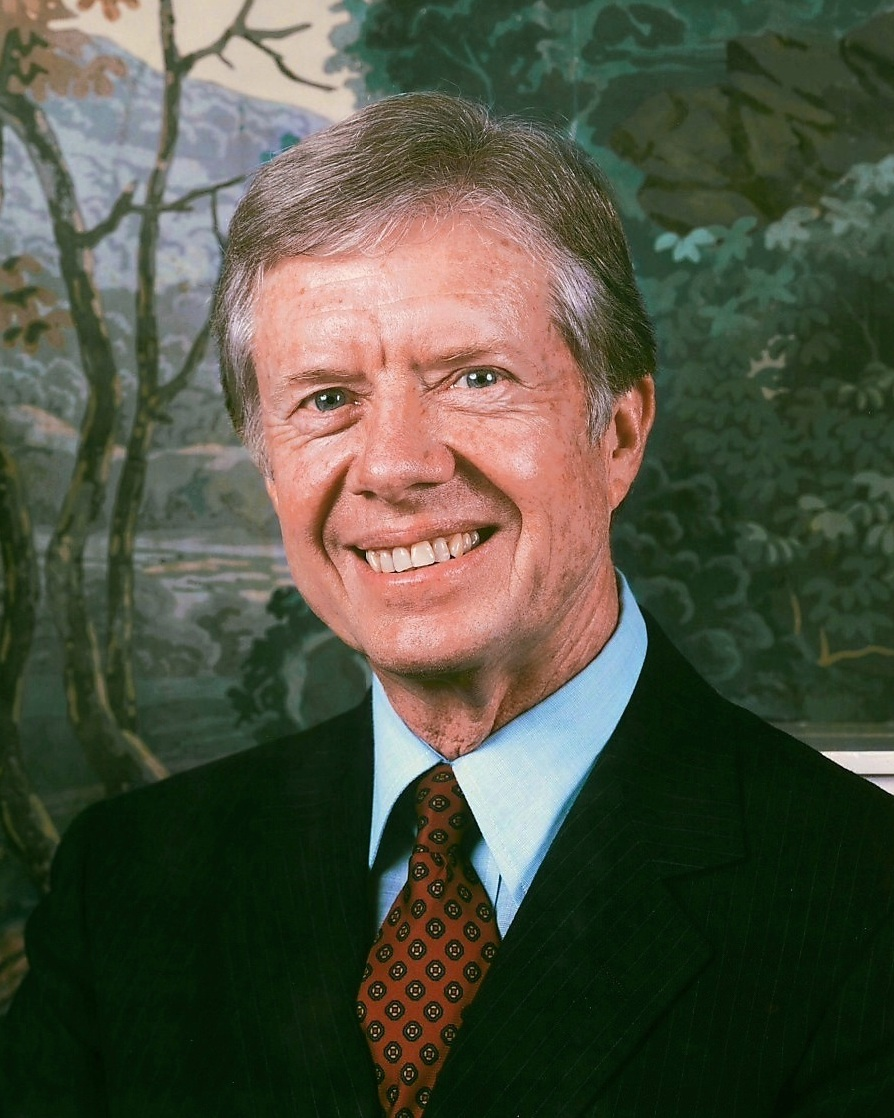
Nominee	Ronald Reagan	Jimmy Carter
Party	Republican	Democratic
Home state	California	Georgia
Running mate	George H. W. Bush	Walter Mondale
Electoral vote	9	0
Popular vote	635,274	616,417
Percentage	49.07%	47.61%
County results
Reagan
40–50%
50–60%
60–70%
70–80%
80–90%
Carter
40–50%
50–60%
60–70%
70–80%
President before election
Jimmy Carter
Democratic
Elected President
Ronald Reagan
Republican

The 1980 United States presidential election in Kentucky took place on November 4, 1980. All 50 states and The District of Columbia were part of the 1980 United States presidential election. Kentucky voters chose 9 electors to the Electoral College, who voted for president and vice president.

Kentucky was won by former California Governor Ronald Reagan (R) by a slim margin of 1 point. As of the 2024 presidential election, this marks the last time that Scott County, Shelby County, Boyle County, Woodford County, Grant County, Anderson County, Mercer County, Pendleton County, and Washington County voted for a Democratic presidential candidate and the most recent election where Kentucky voted to the left of the national popular vote.

== Results ==
Presidential Candidate	Running Mate	Party	Electoral Vote (EV)	Popular Vote (PV)	
Ronald Reagan of California	George H. W. Bush	Republican	9	635,274	49.07%
Jimmy Carter (incumbent)	Walter Mondale (incumbent)	Democratic	0	616,417	47.61%
John B. Anderson	Patrick Lucey	Anderson Coalition (Note: Anderson’s party was listed on this state’s ballot as “Anderson Coalition”.)	0	31,127	2.40%
Ed Clark	David Koch	Libertarian	0	5,531	0.43%
Ellen McCormack	Carroll Driscoll	Respect for Life	0	4,233	0.33%
Barry Commoner	Wretha Hanson	Citizens	0	1,304	0.10%
Andrew Pulley	Matilde Zimmermann	Socialist Workers	0	393	0.03%
Gus Hall	Angela Davis	Communist	0	348	0.03%

=== Results by county ===
County	Ronald Reagan Republican		Jimmy Carter Democratic		John B. Anderson Anderson Coalition		Ed Clark Libertarian		Various candidates Other parties		Margin		Total votes cast
County	#	%	#	%	#	%	#	%	#	%	#	%	Total votes cast
Adair	4,051	63.12%	2,285	35.60%	53	0.83%	21	0.33%	8	0.12%	1,766	27.52%	6,418
Allen	3,186	60.36%	2,010	38.08%	54	1.02%	23	0.44%	5	0.09%	1,176	22.28%	5,278
Anderson	2,052	43.07%	2,567	53.88%	90	1.89%	22	0.46%	33	0.69%	-515	-10.81%	4,764
Ballard	1,190	31.10%	2,583	67.51%	23	0.60%	10	0.26%	20	0.52%	-1,393	-36.41%	3,826
Barren	6,405	53.67%	5,285	44.29%	164	1.37%	61	0.51%	18	0.15%	1,120	9.38%	11,933
Bath	1,463	39.56%	2,174	58.79%	47	1.27%	13	0.35%	1	0.03%	-711	-19.23%	3,698
Bell	5,433	44.95%	6,362	52.63%	150	1.24%	35	0.29%	108	0.89%	-929	-7.68%	12,088
Boone	8,263	58.40%	5,374	37.98%	383	2.71%	73	0.52%	55	0.39%	2,889	20.42%	14,148
Bourbon	2,475	39.00%	3,641	57.37%	153	2.41%	28	0.44%	49	0.77%	-1,166	-18.37%	6,346
Boyd	10,367	47.79%	10,702	49.33%	496	2.29%	105	0.48%	25	0.12%	-335	-1.54%	21,695
Boyle	3,848	44.88%	4,429	51.66%	254	2.96%	33	0.38%	10	0.12%	-581	-6.78%	8,574
Bracken	1,154	43.65%	1,420	53.71%	36	1.36%	23	0.87%	11	0.42%	-266	-10.06%	2,644
Breathitt	1,532	27.69%	3,916	70.79%	68	1.23%	9	0.16%	7	0.13%	-2,384	-43.10%	5,532
Breckinridge	3,629	52.66%	3,163	45.90%	72	1.04%	23	0.33%	4	0.06%	466	6.76%	6,891
Bullitt	6,364	50.60%	5,884	46.79%	202	1.61%	40	0.32%	86	0.68%	480	3.81%	12,576
Butler	3,129	70.31%	1,274	28.63%	28	0.63%	11	0.25%	8	0.18%	1,855	41.68%	4,450
Caldwell	2,609	46.22%	2,924	51.80%	66	1.17%	17	0.30%	29	0.51%	-315	-5.58%	5,645
Calloway	4,498	37.60%	6,809	56.91%	318	2.66%	82	0.69%	257	2.15%	-2,311	-19.31%	11,964
Campbell	16,743	57.32%	11,059	37.86%	943	3.23%	228	0.78%	235	0.80%	5,684	19.46%	29,208
Carlisle	975	38.31%	1,542	60.59%	8	0.31%	6	0.24%	14	0.55%	-567	-22.28%	2,545
Carroll	1,076	32.33%	2,127	63.91%	82	2.46%	32	0.96%	11	0.33%	-1,051	-31.58%	3,328
Carter	3,934	50.18%	3,782	48.25%	86	1.10%	22	0.28%	15	0.19%	152	1.93%	7,839
Casey	4,239	75.27%	1,298	23.05%	38	0.67%	13	0.23%	44	0.78%	2,941	52.22%	5,632
Christian	8,209	52.92%	7,048	45.44%	190	1.22%	47	0.30%	18	0.12%	1,161	7.48%	15,512
Clark	4,302	44.42%	5,071	52.36%	242	2.50%	45	0.46%	25	0.26%	-769	-7.94%	9,685
Clay	4,594	67.78%	2,121	31.29%	37	0.55%	12	0.18%	14	0.21%	2,473	36.49%	6,778
Clinton	3,539	77.10%	1,000	21.79%	34	0.74%	14	0.31%	3	0.07%	2,539	55.31%	4,590
Crittenden	2,219	58.84%	1,508	39.99%	28	0.74%	14	0.37%	2	0.05%	711	18.85%	3,771
Cumberland	2,216	71.92%	821	26.65%	27	0.88%	6	0.19%	11	0.36%	1,395	45.27%	3,081
Daviess	14,643	47.67%	14,902	48.51%	752	2.45%	172	0.56%	248	0.81%	-259	-0.84%	30,717
Edmonson	2,913	68.82%	1,252	29.58%	28	0.66%	6	0.14%	34	0.80%	1,661	39.24%	4,233
Elliott	551	24.59%	1,668	74.43%	15	0.67%	3	0.13%	4	0.18%	-1,117	-49.84%	2,241
Estill	2,818	57.97%	1,965	40.42%	45	0.93%	20	0.41%	13	0.27%	853	17.55%	4,861
Fayette	35,349	49.22%	30,511	42.48%	4,933	6.87%	462	0.64%	562	0.78%	4,838	6.74%	71,817
Fleming	2,189	50.73%	2,051	47.53%	54	1.25%	18	0.42%	3	0.07%	138	3.20%	4,315
Floyd	4,179	27.16%	10,975	71.34%	171	1.11%	32	0.21%	28	0.18%	-6,796	-44.18%	15,385
Franklin	6,455	34.84%	11,193	60.40%	610	3.29%	110	0.59%	162	0.87%	-4,738	-25.56%	18,530
Fulton	1,462	41.22%	2,016	56.84%	31	0.87%	14	0.39%	24	0.68%	-554	-15.62%	3,547
Gallatin	684	40.14%	988	57.98%	20	1.17%	10	0.59%	2	0.12%	-304	-17.84%	1,704
Garrard	2,585	57.70%	1,774	39.60%	62	1.38%	15	0.33%	44	0.98%	811	18.10%	4,480
Grant	1,779	42.53%	2,272	54.32%	76	1.82%	21	0.50%	35	0.84%	-493	-11.79%	4,183
Graves	6,556	47.45%	6,999	50.66%	135	0.98%	40	0.29%	86	0.62%	-443	-3.21%	13,816
Grayson	5,084	62.95%	2,788	34.52%	78	0.97%	25	0.31%	101	1.25%	2,296	28.43%	8,076
Green	2,775	60.50%	1,758	38.33%	39	0.85%	8	0.17%	7	0.15%	1,017	22.17%	4,587
Greenup	6,857	48.04%	7,126	49.92%	220	1.54%	50	0.35%	22	0.15%	-269	-1.88%	14,275
Hancock	1,367	45.51%	1,530	50.93%	52	1.73%	16	0.53%	39	1.30%	-163	-5.42%	3,004
Hardin	9,779	52.19%	8,339	44.50%	452	2.41%	52	0.28%	116	0.62%	1,440	7.69%	18,738
Harlan	5,460	37.77%	8,798	60.86%	131	0.91%	45	0.31%	23	0.16%	-3,338	-23.09%	14,457
Harrison	2,184	38.69%	3,319	58.80%	107	1.90%	29	0.51%	6	0.11%	-1,135	-20.11%	5,645
Hart	3,129	50.44%	3,005	48.44%	42	0.68%	15	0.24%	13	0.21%	124	2.00%	6,204
Henderson	5,074	37.15%	8,082	59.17%	354	2.59%	111	0.81%	38	0.28%	-3,008	-22.02%	13,659
Henry	1,723	35.82%	2,999	62.35%	69	1.43%	13	0.27%	6	0.12%	-1,276	-26.53%	4,810
Hickman	1,143	42.84%	1,456	54.57%	28	1.05%	10	0.37%	31	1.16%	-313	-11.73%	2,668
Hopkins	6,238	40.63%	8,810	57.38%	213	1.39%	49	0.32%	45	0.29%	-2,572	-16.75%	15,355
Jackson	3,379	81.95%	702	17.03%	29	0.70%	8	0.19%	5	0.12%	2,677	64.92%	4,123
Jefferson	127,254	47.97%	125,844	47.44%	9,686	3.65%	1,078	0.41%	1,424	0.54%	1,410	0.53%	265,286
Jessamine	4,809	56.38%	3,310	38.80%	278	3.26%	40	0.47%	93	1.09%	1,499	17.58%	8,530
Johnson	5,039	60.50%	3,142	37.72%	96	1.15%	34	0.41%	18	0.22%	1,897	22.78%	8,329
Kenton	25,965	56.16%	17,907	38.73%	1,583	3.42%	376	0.81%	401	0.87%	8,058	17.43%	46,232
Knott	1,602	22.68%	5,405	76.50%	25	0.35%	18	0.25%	15	0.21%	-3,803	-53.82%	7,065
Knox	5,539	59.95%	3,543	38.34%	113	1.22%	25	0.27%	20	0.22%	1,996	21.61%	9,240
Larue	2,000	47.07%	2,183	51.38%	43	1.01%	20	0.47%	3	0.07%	-183	-4.31%	4,249
Laurel	8,868	68.23%	3,969	30.54%	114	0.88%	33	0.25%	13	0.10%	4,899	37.69%	12,997
Lawrence	2,564	51.49%	2,362	47.43%	32	0.64%	19	0.38%	3	0.06%	202	4.06%	4,980
Lee	1,650	60.53%	1,017	37.31%	41	1.50%	13	0.48%	5	0.18%	633	23.22%	2,726
Leslie	3,536	71.86%	1,327	26.97%	40	0.81%	7	0.14%	11	0.22%	2,209	44.89%	4,921
Letcher	3,426	43.82%	4,280	54.75%	78	1.00%	23	0.29%	11	0.14%	-854	-10.93%	7,818
Lewis	2,802	63.78%	1,543	35.12%	34	0.77%	10	0.23%	4	0.09%	1,259	28.66%	4,393
Lincoln	3,034	49.70%	2,991	48.99%	58	0.95%	14	0.23%	8	0.13%	43	0.71%	6,105
Livingston	1,670	41.67%	2,287	57.06%	30	0.75%	16	0.40%	5	0.12%	-617	-15.39%	4,008
Logan	3,366	43.26%	4,264	54.80%	85	1.09%	18	0.23%	48	0.62%	-898	-11.54%	7,781
Lyon	968	38.31%	1,496	59.20%	26	1.03%	11	0.44%	26	1.03%	-528	-20.89%	2,527
Madison	8,437	47.74%	8,208	46.45%	739	4.18%	134	0.76%	153	0.87%	229	1.29%	17,671
Magoffin	2,265	42.76%	2,986	56.37%	25	0.47%	10	0.19%	11	0.21%	-721	-13.61%	5,297
Marion	2,126	36.55%	3,577	61.50%	87	1.50%	12	0.21%	14	0.24%	-1,451	-24.95%	5,816
Marshall	4,403	40.85%	6,231	57.81%	96	0.89%	43	0.40%	6	0.06%	-1,828	-16.96%	10,779
Martin	2,793	63.05%	1,567	35.37%	51	1.15%	6	0.14%	13	0.29%	1,226	27.68%	4,430
McCracken	10,281	42.27%	13,365	54.94%	369	1.52%	73	0.30%	237	0.97%	-3,084	-12.67%	24,325
McCreary	3,786	71.27%	1,377	25.92%	40	0.75%	26	0.49%	83	1.56%	2,409	45.35%	5,312
McLean	1,497	40.35%	2,147	57.87%	44	1.19%	14	0.38%	8	0.22%	-650	-17.52%	3,710
Mason	2,926	46.54%	3,181	50.60%	127	2.02%	33	0.52%	20	0.32%	-255	-4.06%	6,287
Meade	2,740	45.22%	3,205	52.90%	90	1.49%	16	0.26%	8	0.13%	-465	-7.68%	6,059
Menifee	547	35.45%	966	62.61%	11	0.71%	2	0.13%	17	1.10%	-419	-27.16%	1,543
Mercer	3,275	46.99%	3,528	50.62%	92	1.32%	19	0.27%	56	0.80%	-253	-3.63%	6,970
Metcalfe	2,013	54.30%	1,628	43.92%	39	1.05%	17	0.46%	10	0.27%	385	10.38%	3,707
Monroe	4,592	79.00%	1,156	19.89%	47	0.81%	16	0.28%	2	0.03%	3,436	59.11%	5,813
Montgomery	2,869	44.70%	3,391	52.84%	117	1.82%	25	0.39%	16	0.25%	-522	-8.14%	6,418
Morgan	1,450	34.53%	2,698	64.25%	31	0.74%	11	0.26%	9	0.21%	-1,248	-29.72%	4,199
Muhlenberg	4,893	41.80%	6,616	56.52%	148	1.26%	26	0.22%	23	0.20%	-1,723	-14.72%	11,706
Nelson	3,349	36.75%	5,514	60.50%	162	1.78%	33	0.36%	56	0.61%	-2,165	-23.75%	9,114
Nicholas	915	38.92%	1,349	57.38%	56	2.38%	4	0.17%	27	1.15%	-434	-18.46%	2,351
Ohio	5,272	59.10%	3,486	39.08%	103	1.15%	48	0.54%	12	0.13%	1,786	20.02%	8,921
Oldham	5,586	58.74%	3,487	36.67%	351	3.69%	61	0.64%	25	0.26%	2,099	22.07%	9,510
Owen	944	28.23%	2,323	69.47%	43	1.29%	15	0.45%	19	0.57%	-1,379	-41.24%	3,344
Owsley	1,250	73.57%	437	25.72%	7	0.41%	2	0.12%	3	0.18%	813	47.85%	1,699
Pendleton	1,757	45.45%	1,992	51.53%	69	1.78%	25	0.65%	23	0.59%	-235	-6.08%	3,866
Perry	4,226	40.76%	6,031	58.17%	72	0.69%	18	0.17%	20	0.19%	-1,805	-17.41%	10,367
Pike	10,550	41.02%	14,878	57.85%	204	0.79%	54	0.21%	34	0.13%	-4,328	-16.83%	25,720
Powell	1,716	45.55%	2,006	53.25%	33	0.88%	7	0.19%	5	0.13%	-290	-7.70%	3,767
Pulaski	12,970	65.11%	6,570	32.98%	257	1.29%	88	0.44%	34	0.17%	6,400	32.13%	19,919
Robertson	416	41.64%	562	56.26%	14	1.40%	6	0.60%	1	0.10%	-146	-14.62%	999
Rockcastle	3,543	71.62%	1,345	27.19%	37	0.75%	17	0.34%	5	0.10%	2,198	44.43%	4,947
Rowan	2,758	46.07%	2,975	49.69%	191	3.19%	34	0.57%	29	0.48%	-217	-3.62%	5,987
Russell	3,804	68.66%	1,693	30.56%	29	0.52%	8	0.14%	6	0.11%	2,111	38.10%	5,540
Scott	2,868	43.02%	3,531	52.96%	197	2.95%	28	0.42%	43	0.64%	-663	-9.94%	6,667
Shelby	3,423	42.22%	4,429	54.63%	178	2.20%	45	0.56%	33	0.41%	-1,006	-12.41%	8,108
Simpson	2,020	41.92%	2,713	56.30%	59	1.22%	21	0.44%	6	0.12%	-693	-14.38%	4,819
Spencer	935	42.50%	1,216	55.27%	27	1.23%	7	0.32%	15	0.68%	-281	-12.77%	2,200
Taylor	4,243	54.62%	3,400	43.77%	84	1.08%	23	0.30%	18	0.23%	843	10.85%	7,768
Todd	1,945	48.86%	1,956	49.13%	44	1.11%	11	0.28%	25	0.63%	-11	-0.27%	3,981
Trigg	1,913	41.54%	2,619	56.87%	56	1.22%	13	0.28%	4	0.09%	-706	-15.33%	4,605
Trimble	824	34.45%	1,478	61.79%	49	2.05%	29	1.21%	12	0.50%	-654	-27.34%	2,392
Union	1,847	33.97%	3,479	63.99%	68	1.25%	33	0.61%	10	0.18%	-1,632	-30.02%	5,437
Warren	12,184	53.90%	9,643	42.66%	602	2.66%	120	0.53%	55	0.24%	2,541	11.24%	22,604
Washington	2,008	47.26%	2,147	50.53%	43	1.01%	13	0.31%	38	0.89%	-139	-3.27%	4,249
Wayne	3,972	59.14%	2,673	39.80%	50	0.74%	13	0.19%	8	0.12%	1,299	19.34%	6,716
Webster	1,939	35.03%	3,506	63.34%	52	0.94%	26	0.47%	12	0.22%	-1,567	-28.31%	5,535
Whitley	7,007	63.26%	3,889	35.11%	125	1.13%	41	0.37%	15	0.14%	3,118	28.15%	11,077
Wolfe	951	33.90%	1,814	64.67%	19	0.68%	3	0.11%	18	0.64%	-863	-30.77%	2,805
Woodford	3,105	47.66%	3,122	47.92%	213	3.27%	25	0.38%	50	0.77%	-17	-0.26%	6,515
Totals	635,274	49.07%	616,417	47.61%	31,127	2.40%	5,531	0.43%	6,278	0.49%	18,857	1.46%	1,294,627

==== Counties that flipped from Democratic to Republican ====
- Barren
- Boone (was tied)
- Breckinridge
- Bullitt
- Carter
- Christian
- Crittenden
- Caldwell
- Calloway
- Clark
- Daviess
- Fulton
- Fleming
- Hardin
- Hart
- Lawrence
- Madison
- Metcalfe
- Taylor
- Warren
