= 1979 Chicago mayoral election =

- April 3, 1979
- Turnout: 61% ▲21 pp
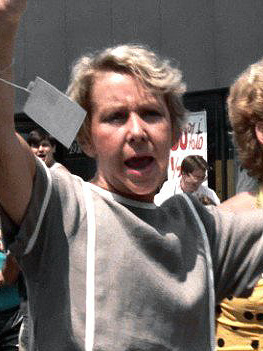

| Nominee | Jane Byrne | Wallace D. Johnson |
| Party | Democratic | Republican |
| Popular vote | 700,874 | 137,664 |
| Percentage | 82.1% | 16.1% |
Mayor before election
Michael A. Bilandic
Democratic
Elected Mayor
Jane Byrne
Democratic

The 1979 Chicago mayoral election was first the primary on February 27, 1979, which was followed by the general on April 3, 1979. The election saw the election of Chicago, Illinois' first female mayor, and the first female mayor of any major American city, Jane M. Byrne. Byrne defeated Republican Wallace Johnson by a landslide 66 percent margin of victory, winning more than 82 percent of the vote. Byrne's 82% of the vote is the most any candidate has received in a Chicago mayoral election.

Byrne had won the Democratic Party's nomination by narrowly defeating incumbent mayor Michael A. Bilandic in the party's primary election.

== Primaries and nominations ==
60.5% of registered voters participated in the primary elections.

=== Democratic primary ===
The Cook County Democratic Party organization (run by the city Democratic political machine) had fully supported incumbent mayor Michael A. Bilandic's bid for renomination for election to a full term as mayor. Byrne, whom Bilandic had previously fired from the post of the city's Commissioner of Consumer Sales in 1977, had launched an underdog challenge to Bilandic. In what was regarded to be a major upset to the Chicago Democratic machine, Jane Byrne succeeded in pulling off an insurgent challenge to Bilandic.

Turnout in the primary was among the greatest in Chicago mayoral history. By some reports, turnout was 839,443, which was 58.97% of Chicago's 1,423,476 voters. Turnout exceeded the average mayoral primary election turnout in the years since 1955 by more than 10 percentage points. Byrne was a first-time candidate for elected office. She campaigned as a progressive reformer. Her campaign manager was Don Rose, who had previously served as the Chicago press secretary for Martin Luther King Jr. She attacked alderman such as Edward M. Burke and Ed Vrdolyak as an "evil cabal" who ran the city's government. Her candidacy was seen as a longshot. Byrne also pledged that as mayor her cabinet would differ from Bilandic's.

Byrne was endorsed by Jesse Jackson. Byrne had lambasted Bilandic's government's slow response to the 1979 Chicago blizzard, criticism which was greatly credited with fueling her upset victory. Polls, up to the election day, had shown Bilandic in the lead.

After the result, The New York Times reported,

[Bilandic's] surprising defeat by an underfinanced newcomer to elective politics inevitably raised questions about the effectiveness and the future of what is perhaps the last of the old‐time, big‐city Democratic machines.

However, The New York Times also noted that, despite running against the Democratic political machine's mayoral candidate, Byrne had expressed "little appetite for dismantling the organization."

==== Democratic primary results ====
Chicago Democratic Party Mayoral Primary, 1979
| Candidate | Votes | % |
|---|---|---|
| Jane Byrne | 412,909 | 51.04 |
| Michael A. Bilandic (incumbent) | 396,194 | 48.96 |
| Majority | 16,775 | 2.07 |
| Total | 809,043 | 100.0 |

===== Democratic primary results by ward =====
Byrne won a majority of the vote in 29 of the city's 50 wards, with Bilandic winning a majority in the remaining 21 wards. She swept the city's African-American wards, winning more than 2/3 of votes from them.

Results by ward
| Ward | Jane Byrne | | Michael Bilandic | | Total |
| Ward | Votes | % | Votes | % | Votes |
|---|---|---|---|---|---|
| 1 | 4,049 | 32.7% | 8,338 | 67.3% | 12,387 |
| 2 | 6,247 | 51.6% | 5,858 | 48.4% | 12,105 |
| 3 | 5,716 | 55.3% | 4,628 | 44.7% | 10,344 |
| 4 | 6,402 | 57.7% | 4,701 | 42.3% | 11,103 |
| 5 | 10,304 | 73.8% | 3,654 | 26.2% | 13,958 |
| 5 | 10,168 | 68.6% | 4,645 | 31.4% | 14,813 |
| 7 | 7,865 | 65.5% | 4,149 | 34.5% | 12,014 |
| 8 | 12,327 | 70.7% | 5,116 | 29.3% | 17,443 |
| 9 | 9,286 | 67.2% | 4,542 | 32.8% | 13,828 |
| 10 | 8,580 | 38.7% | 13,592 | 61.3% | 22,172 |
| 11 | 3,526 | 13.8% | 22,117 | 86.2% | 25,643 |
| 12 | 8,838 | 43.9% | 11,317 | 56.1% | 20,155 |
| 13 | 10,451 | 38.2% | 16,938 | 61.8% | 27,389 |
| 14 | 6,048 | 34.8% | 11,334 | 65.2% | 17,382 |
| 15 | 7,865 | 47.8% | 8,579 | 52.2% | 16,444 |
| 16 | 5,803 | 53.0% | 5,139 | 47.0% | 10,942 |
| 17 | 8,024 | 68.9% | 3,619 | 31.1% | 11,643 |
| 18 | 10,903 | 50.6% | 10,659 | 49.4% | 21,562 |
| 19 | 10,395 | 44.0% | 13,223 | 56.0% | 23,618 |
| 20 | 6,221 | 58.0% | 4,514 | 42.0% | 10,735 |
| 21 | 13,516 | 71.4% | 5,405 | 28.6% | 18,921 |
| 22 | 5,179 | 48.9% | 5,422 | 51.1% | 10,601 |
| 23 | 10,814 | 43.6% | 14,003 | 56.4% | 24,817 |
| 24 | 4,446 | 49.9% | 4,458 | 50.1% | 8,904 |
| 25 | 3,365 | 31.1% | 7,455 | 68.9% | 10,820 |
| 26 | 4,632 | 35.1% | 8,572 | 64.9% | 13,204 |
| 27 | 3,564 | 32.4% | 7,450 | 67.6% | 11,014 |
| 28 | 4,588 | 54.3% | 3,860 | 45.7% | 8,448 |
| 29 | 5,059 | 55.8% | 4,004 | 44.2% | 9,063 |
| 30 | 7,957 | 52.4% | 7,229 | 47.6% | 15,186 |
| 31 | 5,452 | 40.3% | 8,086 | 59.7% | 13,538 |
| 32 | 6,000 | 45.8% | 7,099 | 54.2% | 13,099 |
| 33 | 6,779 | 46.2% | 7,899 | 53.8% | 14,678 |
| 34 | 9,414 | 56.6% | 7,233 | 43.4% | 16,647 |
| 35 | 10,973 | 63.4% | 6,329 | 36.6% | 17,302 |
| 36 | 10,788 | 44.9% | 13,265 | 55.1% | 24,053 |
| 37 | 7,177 | 55.4% | 5,774 | 44.6% | 12,951 |
| 38 | 11,920 | 55.1% | 9,723 | 44.9% | 21,643 |
| 39 | 8,864 | 49.5% | 9,053 | 50.5% | 17,917 |
| 40 | 9,386 | 56.4% | 7,268 | 43.6% | 16,654 |
| 41 | 14,847 | 58.2% | 10,649 | 41.8% | 25,496 |
| 42 | 7,943 | 49.6% | 8,085 | 50.4% | 16,028 |
| 43 | 11,915 | 61.4% | 7,499 | 38.6% | 19,414 |
| 44 | 9,448 | 61.1% | 6,027 | 38.9% | 15,475 |
| 45 | 12,843 | 54.6% | 10,690 | 45.4% | 23,533 |
| 46 | 8,825 | 60.8% | 5,698 | 39.2% | 14,523 |
| 47 | 8,020 | 43.2% | 10,542 | 56.8% | 18,562 |
| 48 | 7,970 | 57.6% | 5,855 | 42.4% | 13,825 |
| 49 | 10,376 | 59.0% | 7,214 | 41.0% | 17,590 |
| 50 | 11,875 | 59.6% | 8,039 | 40.4% | 19,914 |
| Totals | 412,953 | 51.0% | 396,547 | 49.0% | 809,500 |

=== Republican primary ===
Wallace D. Johnson, an investment banker who was the chairman of the firm Howe, Barnes & Johnson Inc., won a landslide victory in the Republican primary over his sole opponent. The total number of votes cast in the Republican primary was 21,144, equal to roughly 2.6% the 809,043 votes cast in the Democratic primary. Johnson had, from 1970 through 1976, been a member of the Chicago Transit Authority board, where he was involved in creating the Super Transfer and Culture Bus, and in 1973 helped to lay the groundwork for the creation of the Regional Transportation Authority.

==== Republican primary results ====
Chicago Republican Party Mayoral Primary, 1979
| Candidate | Votes | % | +/- |
|---|---|---|---|
| Wallace D. Johnson | 18,268 | 86.39 | N/A |
| Raymond G. Wardingley | 2,877 | 13.61 | N/A |
| Majority | 15,391 | 72.79 | N/A |
| Total | 21,144 | 100.0 | N/A |

=== Socialist Workers nomination ===
The Socialist Workers Party nominated Andrew Pulley. Pulley was a steelworker that had been the party's vice presidential nominee in 1972.

== General election ==
Democrat Byrne had the support of such trade unions as the Chicago Federation of Labor and United Auto Workers. Republican nominee Johnson failed to attract much support. Socialist Workers Party nominee Pulley sought to convince voters that neither Democrats nor Republicans offered an adequate alternative for workers. He argued that, despite having support of trade unions, Byrne was "an anti-labor, anti-strike candidate". During his campaign, he urged trade union members to organize to form a labor party in Chicago, urging them to run independent labor candidates in the following year's congressional elections. Pulley, himself a member of United Steelworkers 1066 at U.S. Steel's Gary Works, argued, "If we don't act to establish a political party, the unions will be destroyed."

Despite being its nominee, Johnson's campaign received little organizational assistance from the Republican Party.

Some aldermen (including Edward M. Burke and Edward Vrdolyak, both of whom were in 1979 considered to longtime political foes of Byrne) as well as some Democratic committeemen were accused of trying to work against Byrne in order to decrease the level of the vote with which she would win election. Any such would have proved for naught, however, when the results came in.

=== General election results ===
With 82.05% of the vote, Byrne won the largest vote share in the history of Chicago mayoral elections (excluding the invalid April 1876 election).

The election of Byrne (a resident of the city's North Side) made her the first mayor since 1933 not to hail from the Bridgeport neighborhood. The previous four mayors (Edward J. Kelly, Martin Kennelly, Richard J. Daley, and Bilandic) all hailed from Bridgeport.

Mayor of Chicago 1979 (general election)
| Party | Candidate | Votes | % |
|---|---|---|---|
| Democratic | Jane Byrne | 700,874 | 82.05 |
| Republican | Wallace D. Johnson | 137,663 | 16.12 |
| Socialist Workers | Andrew Pulley | 15,625 | 1.83 |
| Turnout | | 854,162 | |

==== General election results by ward ====
Byrne won a majority of the vote in each of the city's 50 wards. In fact, Byrne won all but two of the city's 3,100 precincts (with the remaining two being carried by Johnson).

Results by ward
| Ward | Jane Byrne (Democratic Party) | | Wallace D. Johnson (Republican Party) | | Andrew Pulley (Socialist Workers Party) | | Total |
| Ward | Votes | % | Votes | % | Votes | % | Votes |
|---|---|---|---|---|---|---|---|
| 1 | 10,799 | 86.4% | 1,497 | 12.0% | 197 | 1.6% | 12,493 |
| 2 | 11,273 | 89.3% | 863 | 6.8% | 494 | 3.9% | 12,630 |
| 3 | 9,050 | 91.2% | 603 | 6.1% | 271 | 2.7% | 9,924 |
| 4 | 10,419 | 87.0% | 1,048 | 8.8% | 502 | 4.2% | 11,969 |
| 5 | 11,929 | 79.8% | 2,048 | 13.7% | 971 | 6.5% | 14,948 |
| 6 | 14,026 | 89.5% | 1,005 | 6.4% | 639 | 4.1% | 15,670 |
| 7 | 10,972 | 81.9% | 1,956 | 14.6% | 476 | 3.6% | 13,404 |
| 8 | 15,881 | 89.3% | 1,078 | 6.1% | 823 | 4.6% | 17,782 |
| 9 | 13,441 | 89.2% | 1,078 | 7.2% | 548 | 3.6% | 15,067 |
| 10 | 15,176 | 76.0% | 4,411 | 22.1% | 372 | 1.9% | 19,959 |
| 11 | 22,511 | 89.6% | 2,448 | 9.7% | 160 | 0.6% | 25,119 |
| 12 | 16,583 | 78.8% | 4,325 | 20.5% | 140 | 0.7% | 21,048 |
| 13 | 22,797 | 78.5% | 6,113 | 21.0% | 131 | 0.5% | 29,041 |
| 14 | 13,957 | 83.7% | 2,539 | 15.2% | 185 | 1.1% | 16,681 |
| 15 | 14,228 | 83.5% | 2,498 | 14.7% | 323 | 1.9% | 17,049 |
| 16 | 10,132 | 92.4% | 543 | 5.0% | 289 | 2.6% | 10,964 |
| 17 | 11,961 | 90.7% | 827 | 6.3% | 396 | 3.0% | 13,184 |
| 18 | 18,453 | 83.5% | 3,280 | 14.8% | 374 | 1.7% | 22,107 |
| 19 | 18,441 | 75.3% | 5,815 | 23.7% | 231 | 0.9% | 24,487 |
| 20 | 10,729 | 90.6% | 771 | 6.5% | 344 | 2.9% | 11,844 |
| 21 | 18,497 | 90.3% | 1,139 | 5.6% | 856 | 4.2% | 20,492 |
| 22 | 9,459 | 85.1% | 1,519 | 13.7% | 140 | 1.3% | 11,118 |
| 23 | 20,989 | 80.5% | 4,926 | 18.9% | 155 | 0.6% | 26,070 |
| 24 | 8,389 | 93.1% | 420 | 4.7% | 202 | 2.2% | 9,011 |
| 25 | 10,056 | 89.2% | 1,113 | 9.9% | 102 | 0.9% | 11,271 |
| 26 | 11,392 | 86.4% | 1,664 | 12.6% | 131 | 1.0% | 13,187 |
| 27 | 11,786 | 94.9% | 445 | 3.6% | 191 | 1.5% | 12,422 |
| 28 | 8,338 | 92.8% | 423 | 4.7% | 223 | 2.5% | 8,984 |
| 29 | 8,870 | 91.3% | 577 | 5.9% | 265 | 2.7% | 9,712 |
| 30 | 13,357 | 81.5% | 2,890 | 17.6% | 132 | 0.8% | 16,379 |
| 31 | 12,886 | 90.0% | 1,304 | 9.1% | 129 | 0.9% | 14,319 |
| 32 | 11,282 | 86.4% | 1,642 | 12.6% | 134 | 1.0% | 13,058 |
| 33 | 12,608 | 83.9% | 2,266 | 15.1% | 157 | 1.0% | 15,031 |
| 34 | 15,971 | 91.7% | 786 | 4.5% | 668 | 3.8% | 17,425 |
| 35 | 15,090 | 75.1% | 4,820 | 24.0% | 191 | 1.0% | 20,101 |
| 36 | 20,790 | 77.6% | 5,827 | 21.7% | 189 | 0.7% | 26,806 |
| 37 | 11,492 | 87.3% | 1,347 | 10.2% | 322 | 2.4% | 13,161 |
| 38 | 18,188 | 74.3% | 6,150 | 25.1% | 136 | 0.6% | 24,474 |
| 39 | 14,929 | 77.2% | 4,262 | 22.0% | 147 | 0.8% | 19,338 |
| 40 | 13,063 | 74.7% | 4,229 | 24.2% | 191 | 1.1% | 17,483 |
| 41 | 19,852 | 70.6% | 8,119 | 28.9% | 163 | 0.6% | 28,134 |
| 42 | 13,876 | 77.1% | 3,867 | 21.5% | 260 | 1.4% | 18,003 |
| 43 | 12,944 | 73.3% | 4,294 | 24.3% | 429 | 2.4% | 17,667 |
| 44 | 13,622 | 77.7% | 3,446 | 19.7% | 453 | 2.6% | 17,521 |
| 45 | 19,786 | 72.7% | 7,259 | 26.7% | 183 | 0.7% | 27,228 |
| 46 | 13,133 | 77.7% | 3,271 | 19.4% | 493 | 2.9% | 16,897 |
| 47 | 15,669 | 79.5% | 3,863 | 19.6% | 174 | 0.9% | 19,706 |
| 48 | 11,335 | 74.5% | 3,568 | 23.4% | 317 | 2.1% | 15,220 |
| 49 | 13,419 | 79.0% | 3,167 | 18.6% | 409 | 2.4% | 16,995 |
| 50 | 17,048 | 79.0% | 4,314 | 20.0% | 217 | 1.0% | 21,579 |
| Totals | 700,874 | 82.1% | 137,663 | 16.1% | 15,625 | 1.8% | 854,162 |
