= Humboldt Park Health =

Hospital in Chicago, Illinois, US

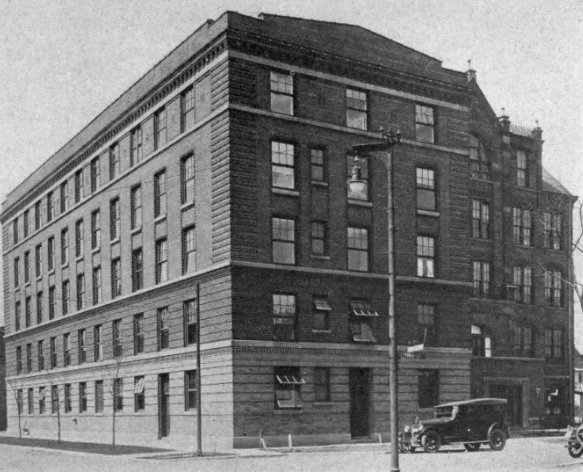
- Norwegian American Hospital, 1044 North Francisco Ave. in 1922

Geography
- Location: Humboldt Park, Chicago, Illinois, United States
- Coordinates: 41°54′03″N 87°41′57″W

Organization
- Care system: Private
- Type: General

Services
- Beds: 200

History
- Former name: Norwegian American Hospital
- Opened: 1894

Links
- Website: www.hph.care
- Lists: Hospitals in Illinois

Humboldt Park Health, formerly known as Norwegian American Hospital, is a nonprofit safety net hospital in Humboldt Park, Chicago that was founded in 1894.

It has about 900 employees, of which about 350 are medical personnel.

It receives about $38 million a year from the Illinois Hospital Assessment Program which funds the Emergency Department, Wound Clinic, Cardiology, and the Comprehensive Diabetes Center. It runs a pediatric mobile medical unit which is known as the Norwegian American Hospital Pediatric Care-A-Van, which is partly funded by the Children's Care Foundation. Cancer services are provided by City of Hope Cancer Center.

In July 2018, it reported that it had a serious problem with a shortage of morphine and other painkillers in the emergency room, which was then run by US Acute Care Solutions.

On January 28, 2021, the change to Humboldt Park Health from Norwegian American Hospital was made by the administration.
