= Children's Care Foundation =

Organization based in Chicago

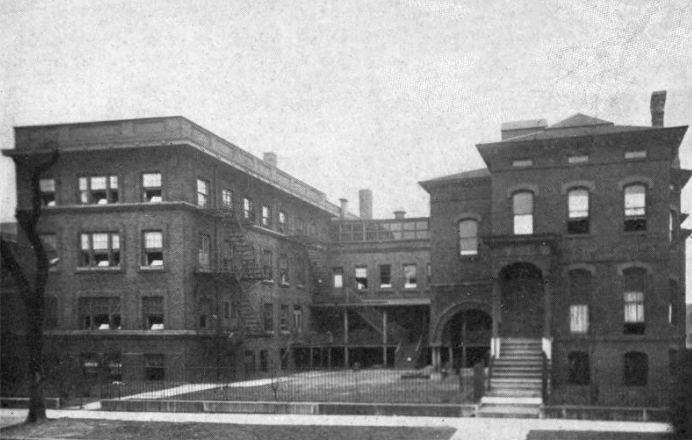
Home for Destitute Crippled Children, 1653 Park Ave. in 1922

The Children's Care Foundation is an organization based in Chicago. It developed from the Home for Destitute Crippled Children, which was established in 1892.

The foundation's building was completed in 1906, had 100 beds, and was affiliated with Rush Medical College. It later developed into the Whyler Children's Hospital, which was opened in 1967. In 1989 the organization ceased its involvement in direct health provision, and became a foundation. Today, the foundation helps to fund the Norwegian American Hospital Pediatric Care-A-Van.

== See also ==
- Wallace D. Johnson, executive director (1990–1994)
