= Jay McMullen (Chicago journalist) =

American journalist (1920–1992)

- 1981 photograph of McMullen (left) and his wife Chicago mayor Jane Byrne in their Cabrini–Green public housing apartment.

First Gentleman of Chicago
- In role April 16, 1979 – April 29, 1983
- Preceded by: Heather Bilandic
- Succeeded by: Loretta Orr (1987)

Personal details
- Born: June 28, 1920 Cicero, Illinois, U.S.
- Died: March 18, 1992 (aged 71) Chicago, Illinois, U.S.
- Spouse: Jane Byrne (m. 1978)
- Children: Kathy Byrne (stepdaugher)
- Occupation: Journalist

Jay McMullen (June 28, 1920 – March 18, 1992) was an American journalist. McMullen graduated from Northwestern University. He was a Chicago City Hall reporter for the Chicago Daily News for nearly quarter of a century. He also worked as a real estate writer for the Chicago Sun-Times for many years. From 1978 until his death 14 years later, McMullen was married to politician Jane Byrne. Byrne served as the Mayor of Chicago from 1979 to 1983, and McMullen was a close advisor to his wife during those years. He also served as her press secretary during her first year in office. He died of cancer at the age of 71 in Chicago in 1992.
