= 1980 United States presidential election in New Jersey =

- November 4, 1980
- Turnout: 79.75% (▼0.82%)

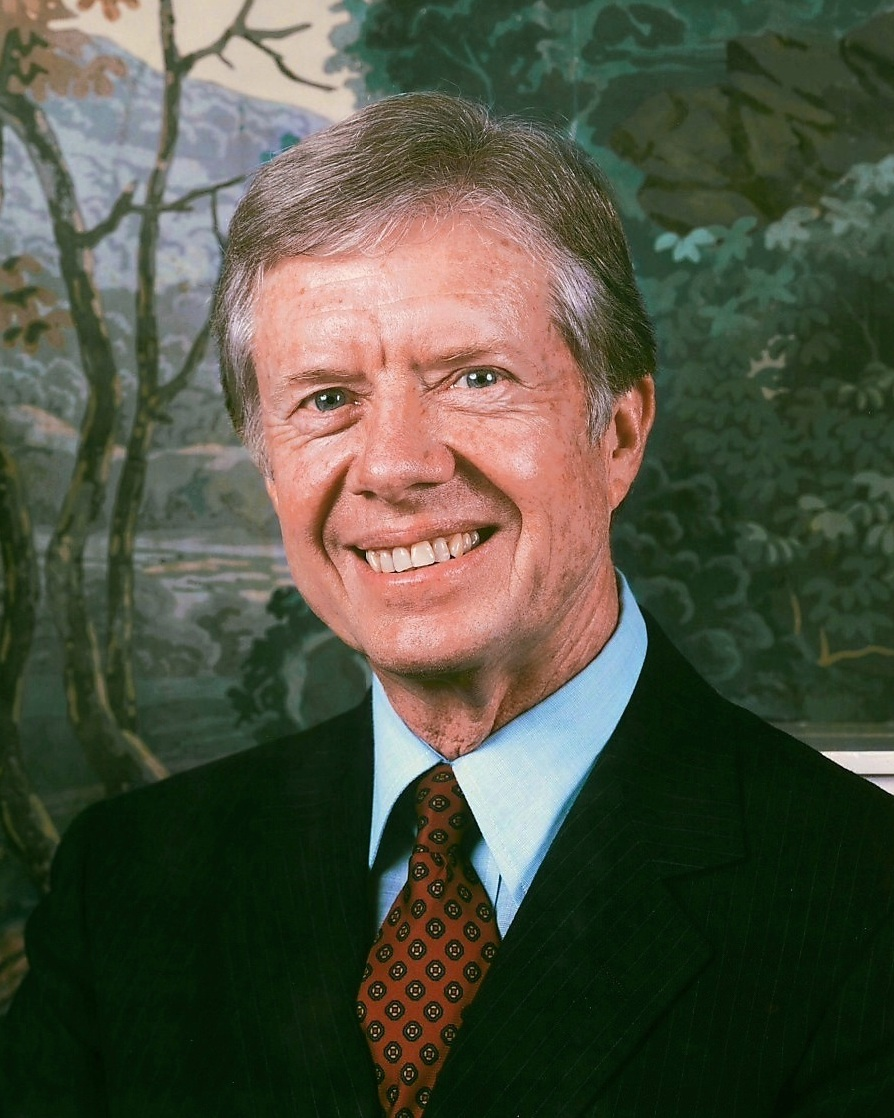

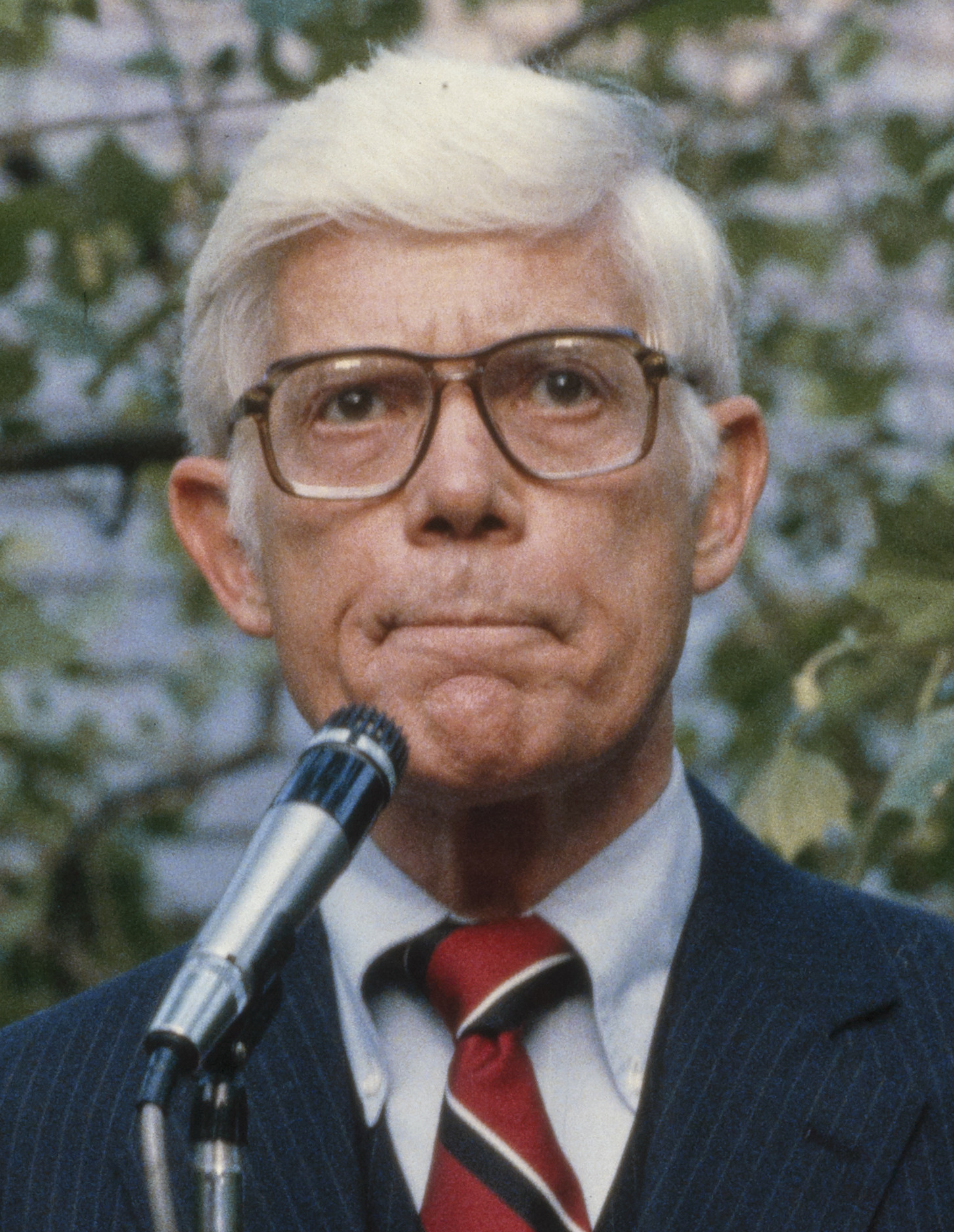
Nominee	Ronald Reagan	Jimmy Carter	John B. Anderson
Party	Republican	Democratic	Anderson Alternative (Note: Anderson’s party was listed on this state’s ballot as “Anderson Alternative”.)
Home state	California	Georgia	Illinois
Running mate	George H. W. Bush	Walter Mondale	Patrick Lucey
Electoral vote	17	0	0
Popular vote	1,546,557	1,147,364	234,632
Percentage	51.97%	38.56%	7.88%
County results
Reagan
40–50%
50–60%
60–70%
Carter
40–50%
50–60%
President before election
Jimmy Carter
Democratic
Elected President
Ronald Reagan
Republican

The 1980 United States presidential election in New Jersey took place on November 4, 1980. All 50 states and the District of Columbia, were part of the 1980 United States presidential election. Voters chose seventeen electors to the Electoral College, which selected the president and vice president.

New Jersey was won by the Republican nominees, former actor and Governor Ronald Reagan of California and former CIA Director George H. W. Bush of Texas. Reagan and Bush defeated the Democratic nominees, incumbent President Jimmy Carter of Georgia and his running mate incumbent Vice President Walter Mondale of Minnesota. Also in the running was former Republican Congressman John B. Anderson of Illinois, who ran as an independent with former Ambassador and Governor Patrick Lucey of Wisconsin.

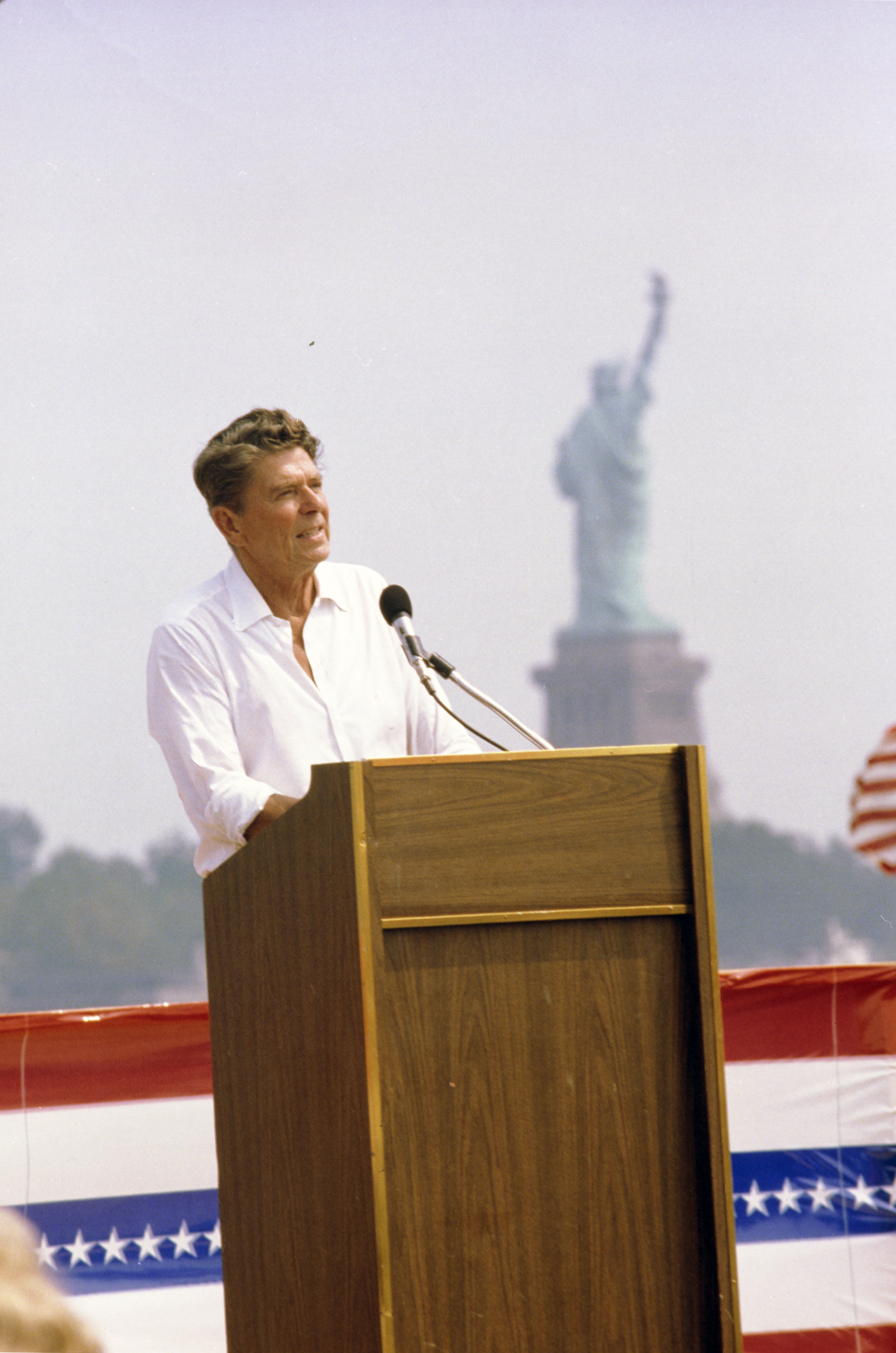
Ronald Reagan giving a speech at Liberty State Park in Jersey City, New Jersey on September 1, 1980.

Reagan carried New Jersey with 51.97% of the vote to Carter's 38.56%, a margin of 13.42%.

Anderson came in a strong but distant third, with 7.88% of the vote. Reagan won 18 of the state's 21 counties, with Carter only holding onto the 3 most heavily Democratic counties in New Jersey: Essex County, Hudson County, and Mercer County. New Jersey weighed in for this election as almost 4% more Republican than the national average.

New Jersey in this era was a swing state with a slight Republican tilt; four years earlier, in 1976, the state had narrowly backed Republican Gerald Ford over Jimmy Carter by a 50–48 margin, as Carter won nationally over Ford by a similarly narrow 50–48 margin. However, in 1980, with Reagan winning convincingly at the national level, the state easily remained in the Republican column. Carter was also hurt in the state by the candidacy of John Anderson, who had been a liberal Republican Congressman and whose campaign appealed strongly to Northeastern liberals and moderates who viewed Reagan as being too extreme and too far to the right, but who were dissatisfied with the status quo under the Carter Administration. Carter bled a substantial amount of support among such liberals and moderates in New Jersey who would likely have leaned Democratic in 1980 but instead voted for Anderson as a protest vote, pushing Carter below 40% and widening Reagan's margin over Carter.

== Results ==
1980 United States presidential election in New Jersey
Party	Candidate	Votes	Percentage	Electoral votes
Republican	Ronald Reagan	1,546,557	51.97%	17
Democratic	Jimmy Carter (incumbent)	1,147,364	38.56%	0
Anderson Alternative	John B. Anderson	234,632	7.88%	0
Libertarian	Ed Clark	20,652	0.69%	0
Citizens	Barry Commoner	8,203	0.28%	0
Right to Life	Ellen McCormack	3,927	0.13%	0
Middle Class	Kurt Lynen	3,694	0.12%	0
Communist	Gus Hall	2,555	0.09%	0
Socialist Workers	Andrew Pulley	2,198	0.07%	0
Socialist	David McReynolds	1,973	0.07%	0
Down with Lawyers	Bill Gahres	1,718	0.06%	0
Workers World	Deirdre Griswold	1,288	0.04%	0
Independent	Martin Wendelken	923	0.03%	0
Totals		2,975,684	100.0%	17
Voter Turnout (Voting age/Registered)				55%/79%

=== Results by county ===
County	Ronald Reagan Republican		Jimmy Carter Democratic		John B. Anderson Anderson Alternative		Ed Clark Libertarian		Various candidates Other parties		Margin		Total votes cast
County	#	%	#	%	#	%	#	%	#	%	#	%	Total votes cast
Atlantic	37,973	49.83%	31,286	41.06%	5,582	7.33%	800	1.05%	561	0.74%	6,687	8.77%	76,202
Bergen	232,043	55.89%	139,474	33.60%	38,242	9.21%	2,661	0.64%	2,737	0.66%	92,569	22.29%	415,157
Burlington	68,415	51.94%	50,083	38.03%	11,314	8.59%	1,010	0.77%	887	0.67%	18,332	13.91%	131,709
Camden	87,939	47.07%	80,033	42.84%	16,125	8.63%	1,267	0.68%	1,444	0.77%	7,906	4.23%	186,808
Cape May	22,729	59.08%	12,708	33.03%	2,550	6.63%	312	0.81%	172	0.45%	10,021	26.05%	38,471
Cumberland	23,242	50.09%	19,356	41.71%	3,253	7.01%	324	0.70%	228	0.49%	3,886	8.38%	46,403
Essex	117,222	40.82%	145,281	50.59%	21,271	7.41%	1,192	0.42%	2,200	0.77%	-28,059	-9.77%	287,166
Gloucester	40,306	51.08%	29,804	37.77%	7,533	9.55%	851	1.08%	409	0.52%	10,502	13.31%	78,903
Hudson	91,207	45.90%	95,622	48.13%	8,941	4.50%	840	0.42%	2,078	1.05%	-4,415	-2.23%	198,688
Hunterdon	21,403	58.75%	10,029	27.53%	3,610	9.91%	404	1.11%	984	2.70%	11,374	31.22%	36,430
Mercer	53,450	41.57%	60,888	47.35%	12,117	9.42%	1,153	0.90%	974	0.76%	-7,438	-5.78%	128,582
Middlesex	122,354	50.73%	97,304	40.34%	17,463	7.24%	1,787	0.74%	2,298	0.95%	25,050	10.39%	241,206
Monmouth	120,173	56.69%	71,328	33.65%	17,444	8.23%	1,696	0.80%	1,330	0.63%	48,845	23.04%	211,971
Morris	105,260	60.63%	48,965	28.20%	17,181	9.90%	1,375	0.79%	823	0.47%	56,295	32.43%	173,604
Ocean	98,433	62.47%	46,923	29.78%	10,073	6.39%	1,165	0.74%	974	0.62%	51,510	32.69%	157,568
Passaic	82,531	51.92%	61,486	38.68%	9,385	5.90%	904	0.57%	4,645	2.92%	21,045	13.24%	158,951
Salem	13,000	51.03%	10,209	40.08%	1,800	7.07%	265	1.04%	200	0.79%	2,791	10.95%	25,474
Somerset	52,591	57.21%	29,470	32.06%	8,346	9.08%	599	0.65%	922	1.00%	23,121	25.15%	91,928
Sussex	27,063	63.94%	10,531	24.88%	3,988	9.42%	518	1.22%	227	0.54%	16,532	39.06%	42,327
Union	112,288	51.66%	86,074	39.60%	15,586	7.17%	1,157	0.53%	2,234	1.03%	26,214	12.06%	217,339
Warren	16,935	54.99%	10,510	34.13%	2,828	9.18%	372	1.21%	152	0.49%	6,425	20.86%	30,797
Totals	1,546,557	51.97%	1,147,364	38.56%	234,632	7.88%	20,652	0.69%	26,479	0.89%	399,193	13.41%	2,975,684

Counties that flipped from Democratic to Republican

- Middlesex
- Burlington
- Camden
- Salem
- Gloucester
- Atlantic
- Cumberland

== See also ==
- United States presidential elections in New Jersey
- Presidency of Ronald Reagan
