= Etna Green, Indiana =

- Town
- Town of Etna Green
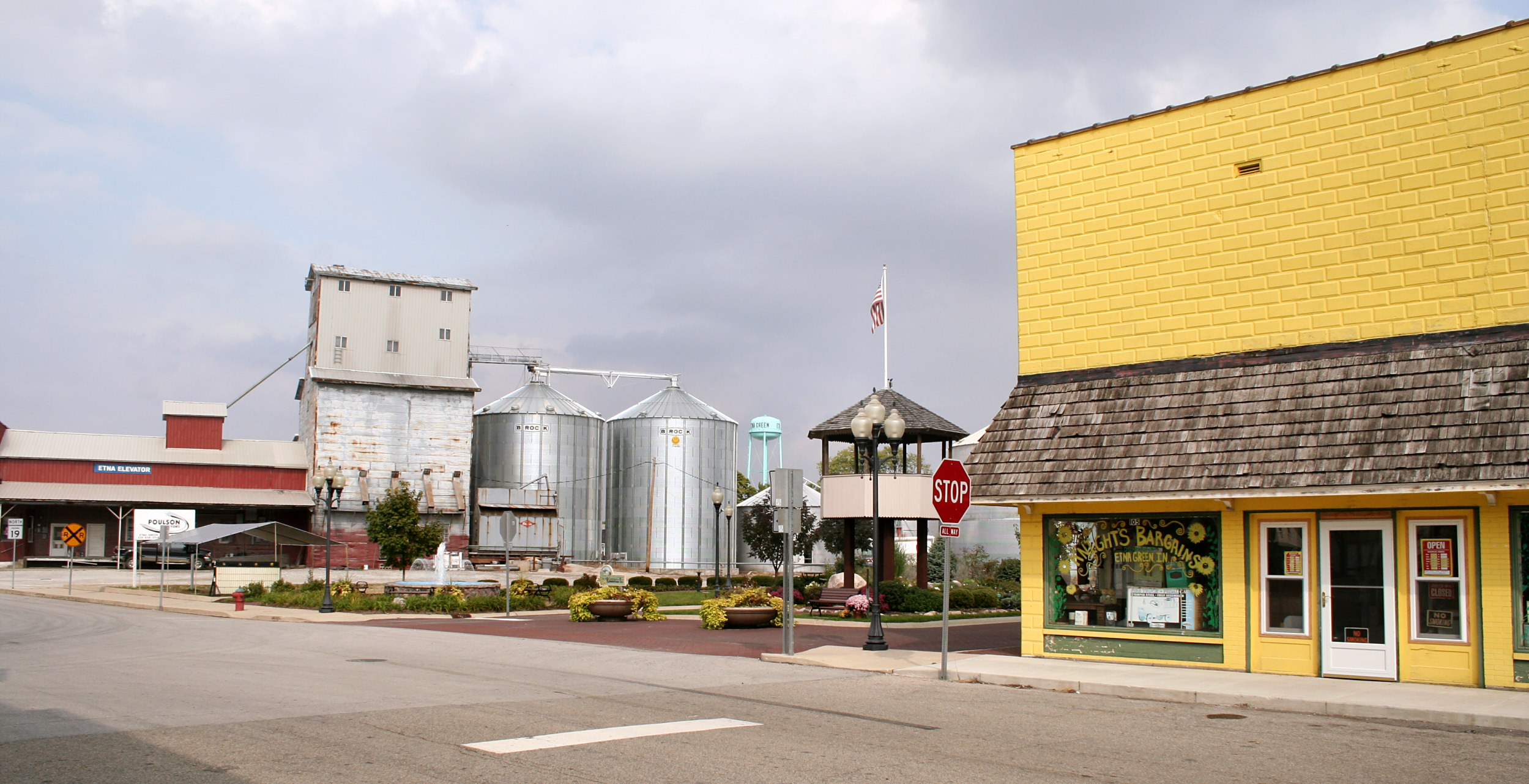
- Downtown Etna Green

- Location of Etna Green in Kosciusko County, Indiana.
- Coordinates: 41°16′32″N 86°02′46″W
- Country: United States
- State: Indiana
- County: Kosciusko
- Township: Etna

Area
  - Total: 0.50 sq mi (1.30 km^{2})
  - Land: 0.50 sq mi (1.30 km^{2})
  - Water: 0 sq mi (0.00 km^{2})
- Elevation: 827 ft (252 m)

Population (2020)
  - Total: 570
  - Density: 1,138/sq mi (439.3/km^{2})
- Time zone: UTC-5 (Eastern (EST))
  - Summer (DST): UTC-4 (EDT)
- ZIP code: 46524
- Area code: 574
- FIPS code: 18-21502
- GNIS feature ID: 2396930
- Website: etnagreenin.com

Etna Green is a town in Etna Township, Kosciusko County, in the U.S. state of Indiana. The population was 586 at the 2010 census and 535 as of 2023.

== History ==
Etna Green was laid out in 1853. It took its name from Etna Township. The Etna Green post office was established in 1854.

== Geography ==
According to the 2010 census, Etna Green has a total area of 0.51 square miles (1.32 km^{2}), all land.

== Demographics ==
Historical population
Census	Pop.	Note	%±
1870	397		—
1880	388		−2.3%
1890	411		5.9%
1900	420		2.2%
1910	431		2.6%
1920	357		−17.2%
1930	371		3.9%
1940	423		14.0%
1950	444		5.0%
1960	483		8.8%
1970	516		6.8%
1980	522		1.2%
1990	578		10.7%
2000	663		14.7%
2010	586		−11.6%
2020	570		−2.7%
U.S. Decennial Census

=== 2010 census ===
As of the census of 2010, there were 586 people, 219 households, and 159 families living in the town. The population density was 1,149.0 inhabitants per square mile (443.6/km^{2}). There were 245 housing units at an average density of 480.4 per square mile (185.5/km^{2}). The racial makeup of the town was 97.8% White, 0.5% African American, 0.3% Native American, 0.3% Asian, 0.5% from other races, and 0.5% from two or more races. Hispanic or Latino of any race were 2.4% of the population.

There were 219 households, of which 37.0% had children under the age of 18 living with them, 52.5% were married couples living together, 11.4% had a female householder with no husband present, 8.7% had a male householder with no wife present, and 27.4% were non-families. 23.3% of all households were made up of individuals, and 7.8% had someone living alone who was 65 years of age or older. The average household size was 2.64 and the average family size was 3.09.

The median age in the town was 35.9 years. 27.3% of residents were under the age of 18; 9.4% were between the ages of 18 and 24; 24.8% were from 25 to 44; 26.7% were from 45 to 64; and 11.9% were 65 years of age or older. The gender makeup of the town was 49.8% male and 50.2% female.

=== 2000 census ===
As of the census of 2000, there were 663 people, 234 households, and 165 families living in the town. The population density was 1,411.3 inhabitants per square mile (544.9/km^{2}). There were 251 housing units at an average density of 534.3 per square mile (206.3/km^{2}). The racial makeup of the town was 96.98% White, 0.45% African American, 0.30% Native American, 0.75% Asian, 1.21% from other races, and 0.30% from two or more races. Hispanic or Latino of any race were 2.87% of the population.

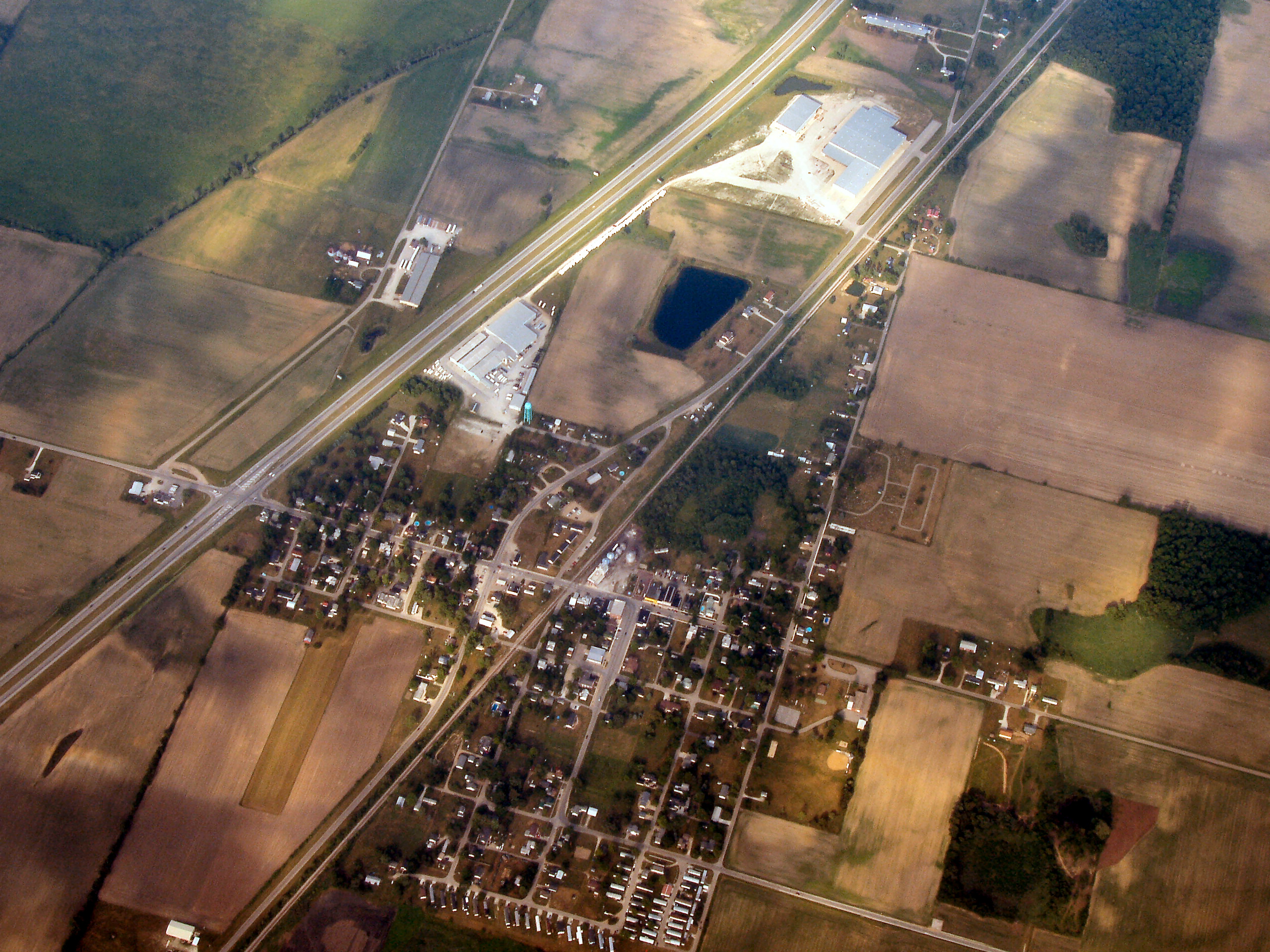
Etna Green from the air.

There were 234 households, out of which 42.3% had children under the age of 18 living with them, 52.6% were married couples living together, 13.7% had a female householder with no husband present, and 29.1% were non-families. 21.4% of all households were made up of individuals, and 9.4% had someone living alone who was 65 years of age or older. The average household size was 2.80 and the average family size was 3.33.

In the town, the population was spread out, with 33.3% under the age of 18, 8.1% from 18 to 24, 30.3% from 25 to 44, 17.6% from 45 to 64, and 10.6% who were 65 years of age or older. The median age was 30 years. For every 100 females, there were 102.8 males. For every 100 females age 18 and over, there were 92.2 males.

The median income for a household in the town was $35,625, and the median income for a family was $35,139. Males had a median income of $34,000 versus $21,339 for females. The per capita income for the town was $14,110. About 3.1% of families and 4.9% of the population were below the poverty line, including 2.6% of those under age 18 and 9.2% of those age 65 or over.
