= Etna Township, Kosciusko County, Indiana =

Etna Township
- Township
- Coordinates: 41°18′00″N 86°20′00″W
- Country: United States
- State: Indiana
- County: Kosciusko

Government
  - Type: Indiana township

Area
  - Total: 20.38 sq mi (52.8 km^{2})
  - Land: 20.17 sq mi (52.2 km^{2})
  - Water: 0.21 sq mi (0.54 km^{2})
- Elevation: 820 ft (250 m)

Population (2020)
  - Total: 1,500
  - Density: 74.5/sq mi (28.8/km^{2})
- Time zone: UTC-5 (Eastern (EST))
  - Summer (DST): UTC-4 (EDT)
- FIPS code: 18-21466
- GNIS feature ID: 453280

Historical population
Census	Pop.	Note	%±
1920	1,007		—
1930	986		−2.1%
1940	993		0.7%
1950	1,050		5.7%
1960	1,056		0.6%
1970	1,037		−1.8%
1980	1,150		10.9%
1990	1,290		12.2%
2000	1,521		17.9%
2010	1,503		−1.2%
2020	1,500		−0.2%
US Census:

Etna Township is one of seventeen townships in Kosciusko County, Indiana. As of the 2020 census, its population was 1,500 (a tiny decline of 1,503 from 2010) and it contained 537 housing units.

== Geography ==
According to the 2010 census, the township has a total area of 20.38 square miles (52.8 km^{2}), of which 20.17 square miles (52.2 km^{2}) (or 98.97%) is land and 0.21 square miles (0.54 km^{2}) (or 1.03%) is water.

=== Cities and towns ===
- Etna Green
