= Andrew Pulley =

American politician (born 1951)

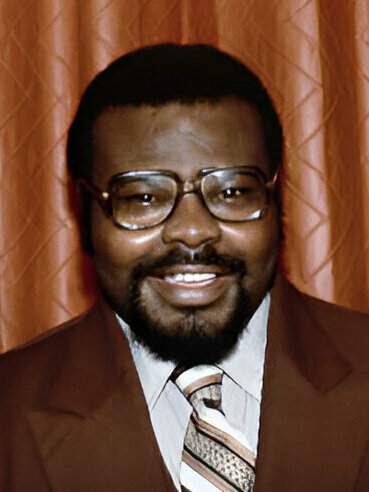
- Pulley in 1979
- Born: Andrew Pulley; May 5, 1951 (age 75); Chicago, Illinois, U.S.
- Occupation: Political activist
- Political party: Socialist Workers

Cleve Andrew Pulley (born May 5, 1951) is an American former politician who ran as the Socialist Workers Party (SWP) nominee for Vice President of the United States in 1972 and one of three nominees the party put forth for President of the United States in 1980. Pulley was also the SWP's nominee for mayor of Chicago in 1979 and has also run for the United States Congress in the state of Michigan.

== Biography ==
Pulley is African American and from Chicago, Illinois.

He strongly supported the civil rights movement, was a steel mill worker, and Vietnam War U.S. Army veteran who had opposed the war. Pulley's speech at the April 24, 1971 500,000 person protest march in Washington, D.C. against the Vietnam War appears in filmmaker David Loeb Weiss' 1972 documentary short film, To Make a Revolution. Pulley was one of the Fort Jackson Eight. Pulley was a member of United Steelworkers Local 1066 at Gary Works.

In 1972, he was the Socialist Workers Party nominee for vice president in 1972, the running mate of Linda Jenness. He and Jenness were nominated at the party's convention in Cleveland, which was held in August 1971. At the time of the election, he was twenty-one years old, making him ineligible to serve as vice president under the United States Constitution (also ineligible was Jenness, who was 31). The ticket of Jenness and him received 52,799 votes.

In 1979, Pulley ran for mayor of Chicago as the SWP nominee. He received 1.83% of the vote.

In some states, he was the SWP nominee for president in 1980. As the party's presidential nominee in the states of California, Colorado, Delaware, Georgia, Kentucky, Mississippi, New Jersey, New Mexico, and South Dakota, he received a total of 6,272 votes nationwide. Among those supporting his candidacy was future-Senator Bernie Sanders.

In 1984, Pulley was the SWP nominee for Michigan's 1st congressional district, and received 0.4% of the vote. A central part of his platform was opposition to the privatization of Wayne County General Hospital.

In 1990, Pulley ran without any party affiliation for Michigan's 13th congressional district. He placed fifth out of five candidates, with 530 votes (0.8% of votes cast).

Party political offices
Preceded by Paul Boutelle	Socialist Workers Party nominee for Vice President of the United States; 1972	Succeeded by Willie Mae Reid
Preceded by Peter Camejo	Socialist Workers Party nominee for President of the United States; 1980; With: Clifton DeBerry and Richard Congress	Succeeded by Melvin T. Mason
