= Michael Zalewski =

Michael Zalewski may refer to:

- Michael J. Zalewski, member of the Illinois General Assembly
- Michael R. Zalewski (born 1954), City of Chicago alderman
- Michał Zalewski (born 1981), computer security expert
- Mike Zalewski (born 1992), American ice hockey player
