= Brendan Reilly (politician) =

American politician

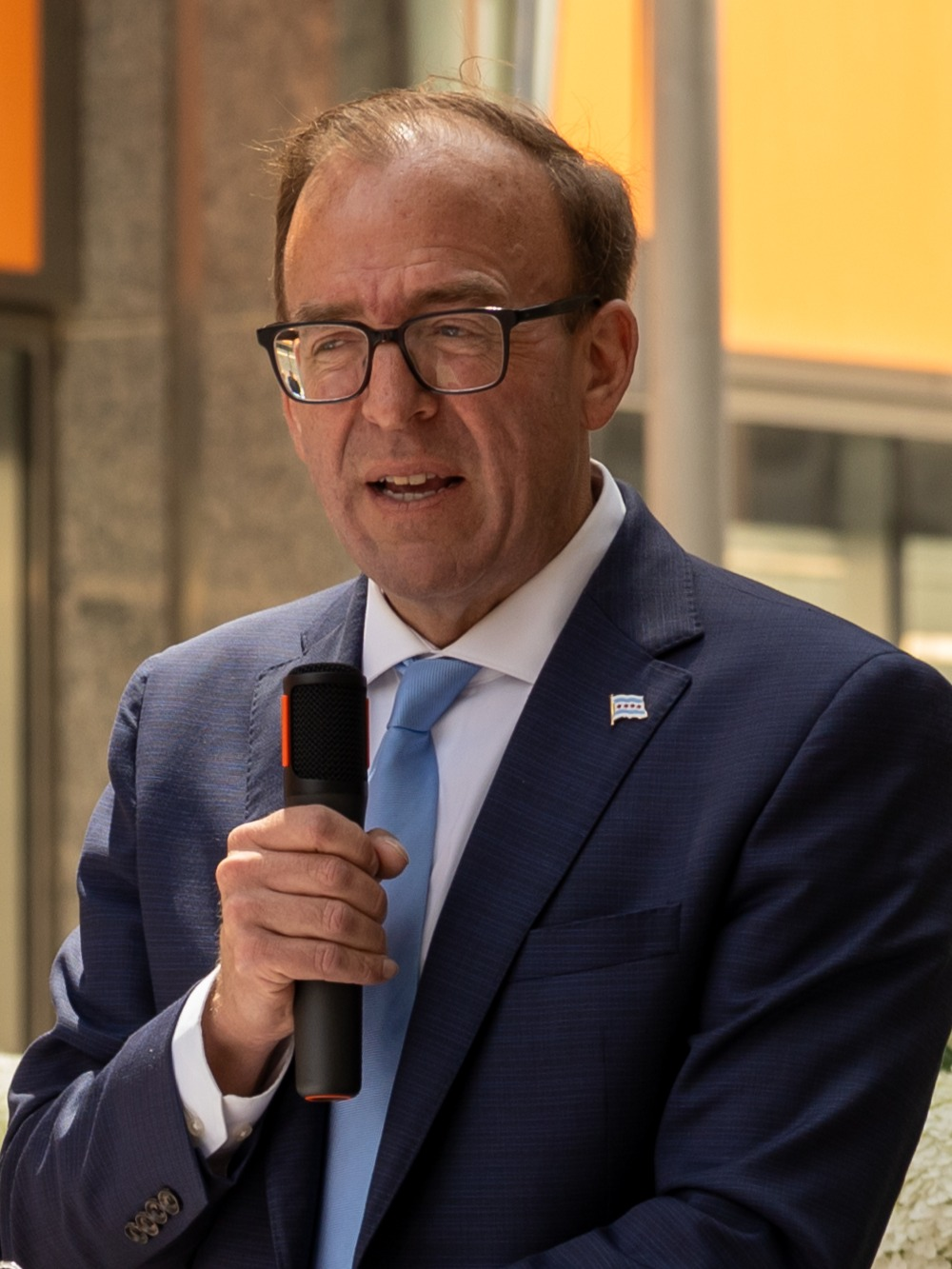
- Reilly in 2025

President pro tempore of the Chicago City Council
- In office May 20, 2019 – May 15, 2023
- Preceded by: Margaret Laurino
- Succeeded by: Samantha Nugent

7th Vice Mayor of Chicago
- In office May 18, 2015 – May 20, 2019
- Mayor: Rahm Emanuel
- Preceded by: Ray Suarez
- Succeeded by: Tom Tunney

Member of the Chicago City Council from the 42nd ward
- Incumbent
- Assumed office May 21, 2007
- Preceded by: Burton Natarus

Personal details
- Born: December 26, 1971 (age 54)
- Party: Democratic
- Spouse: Kristin Reilly
- Education: Hobart College (BA)

Brendan Reilly (born December 26, 1971) is an American politician who has served as alderman of Chicago's 42nd ward since 2007, when he unseated incumbent Burton Natarus. He served as Vice Mayor of Chicago, being elected to that position by the Chicago City Council, from 2015 to 2019. From May 2019 to May 2023, he served as President pro tempore of the Council, which means that he presided over council proceedings in the mayor's absence.

== Early life and education ==
Reilly was born December 26, 1971.

Reilly completed his bachelor's degree from Hobart College in 1994.

== Professional and public career ==
In 1995 he joined the staff of the Illinois House of Representatives. He served as Communications Director for the Democratic caucus before leaving in 2001. In 2001, Reilly served as press director of Paul Vallas's campaign in the Democratic primary of the 2002 Illinois gubernatorial election.

Reilly serves as a board member of the Energy Foundry, a non-profit venture capital fund dealing with green technology. He is also a member of the State of Illinois Smart Grid Advisory Council. He is a member of the Committee on Economic, Capital and Technology Development.

== Aldermanic career ==
Reilly was elected Chicago alderman for the 42nd ward in 2007, unseating longtime incumbent Burton Natarus. Reilly has subsequently been reelected in 2011, 2015, and 2019.

Reilly voted against a tax subsidy that would have allowed a Catholic hospital to build a cancer clinic in an under served area of Chicago because, as Catholics, they would not be pro-abortion.

Reilly served as Vice Mayor of Chicago from 2015 to 2019, being elected to that position by the Chicago City Council. Since May 2019, he has served as President pro tempore of the Council, which means that he presides over council proceedings in the absence of the mayor.

In the runoff of the 2019 Chicago mayoral election, Reilly endorsed Lori Lightfoot.

In November 2019, Reilly was one of fifteen aldermen to oppose a $72 million property tax increase in Mayor Lori Lightfoot's first budget that included $7 million in funding for City Colleges, $32 million in funding to retire a general obligation bond issue and $18 million in funding for libraries. However, he voted for the budget as a whole.

In the 2020 Cook County State's Attorney election, Reilly endorsed Bill Conway in his primary challenge against Kim Foxx, the Democratic incumbent. After Conway lost 50-31, Reilly endorsed Republican former Cook County Judge Pat O'Brien in the general election instead of backing Foxx. For the snub of his party's candidate, Reilly was sent a letter of reprimand by the Cook County Democratic Party. Ahead of the first round of the 2023 Chicago mayoral election, Reilly endorsed Paul Vallas.

== 2026 Cook County Board President campaign ==
In September 2025, Reilly announced he would challenge incumbent Toni Preckwinkle for the Democratic nomination for Cook County Board President in 2026. Reilly ultimately lost the race by over 37%.

== Personal life ==
Reilly has lived in downtown Chicago with his wife Kristin since 1997.

== See also ==
- List of Chicago alderpersons since 1923
