= 2020 Cook County State's Attorney election =

- November 3, 2020
- Turnout: 72.20% (ballots cast) (Note: share of registered voters casting a ballot in Cook County); 67.72% (votes cast) (Note: share of registered voters casting a vote for State's Attorney; this statistic excludes ballots which undervoted by leaving a "blank vote" for State's Attorney)
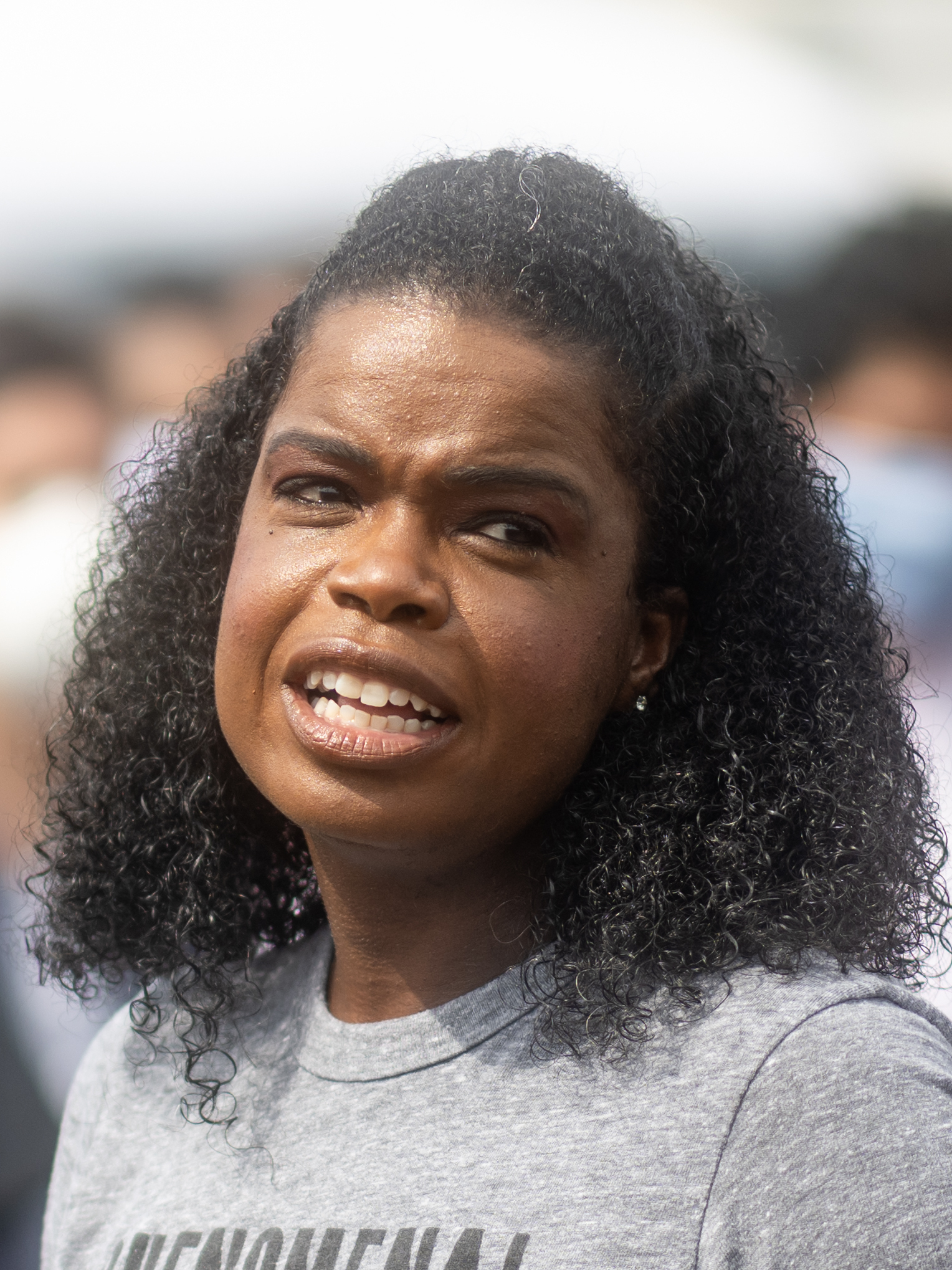

Candidate	Kim Foxx	Pat O'Brien	Brian Dennehy
Party	Democratic	Republican	Libertarian
Popular vote	1,194,299	861,108	147,769
Percentage	54.21%	39.08%	6.71%
- Precinct results Foxx: 40–50% 50–60% 60–70% 70–80% 80–90% >90% O'Brien: 40–50% 50–60% 60–70% 70–80% 80–90% >90%
State's Attorney before election
Kim Foxx
Democratic
Elected State's Attorney
Kim Foxx
Democratic

The 2020 Cook County state's attorney election was held on November 3, 2020. Incumbent state's attorney Kim Foxx (a Democrat) won reelection to a second term, defeating Republican Pat O'Brien in the general election. Foxx had earlier defeated three opponents in the Democratic primary.

== Democratic primary ==
Incumbent Kim Foxx faced three opponents: two former assistant state's attorneys, Bill Conway and Donna More; and former Chicago alderman Bob Fioretti.

The money spent in the Democratic primary made this the most expensive state's attorney election in Cook County to date. Conway raised $11.9 million in campaign funds, most of which was from his father William E. Conway's cumulative donations of $10.5 million. Foxx raised $2.8 million, and her biggest donors included Fred Eychaner and the political action committee of SEIU Illinois. (Note: Foxx's campaign committee was created prior to her previous run for the office in the 2016 election. This amount counts all donations received by the committee after December 1, 2016, when Foxx first took office.) More raised $406,000 and Fioretti raised $20,000. (Note: Fioretti's campaign committee had been active for several of his prior runs for office. This amount counts all donations received by the committee since April 2019, after the end of the 2019 Chicago mayoral election where Fioretti last ran for office.)

=== Candidates in the Democratic primary ===
The following candidates ran for the Democratic Party nomination for state's attorney:

Candidate	Experience	Campaign	Ref
Bill Conway	Former Navy Intelligence officer Former Cook County Assistant State's Attorney	Website	
Bob Fioretti	Former Chicago alderman for the 2nd ward Candidate for Mayor of Chicago in the 2015 and 2019 elections Candidate for Cook County Board President in 2018; Candidate for Illinois State Senate in 2016	Website	
Kim Foxx	Incumbent; Former Chief of Staff for Cook County Board President; Former Cook County Assistant State's Attorney	Website	
Donna More	Candidate for Cook County State's Attorney in 2016; Former U.S. Attorney and Cook County Assistant State's Attorney	Website	

=== Endorsements for the Democratic primary ===
Bill Conway

Organizations

- Chicago Fire Fighters Union Local 2
- International Union of Elevator Constructors
- Maine Township Democratic Organization
- United Hellenic Voters of America

Elected officials

- Felix Cardona Jr., Chicago alderman for the 31st ward
- Brian K. Hopkins, Chicago alderman for the 2nd ward
- Ariel Reboyras, Chicago alderman for the 30th ward
- Brendan Reilly, Chicago alderman for the 42nd ward
- Nicholas Sposato, Chicago alderman for the 38th ward
Bob Fioretti

Organizations

- Fraternal Order of Police Chicago Lodge #7
Kim Foxx

Newspapers

- Chicago Sun-Times

Organizations

- Chicago Federation of Labor
- Chicago Teachers Union
- Color of Change
- Cook County Democratic Party
- Democratic Party of Evanston
- Equality Illinois
- Independent Voters of Illinois Independent Precinct Organization
- The People's Lobby
- Personal PAC
- Real Justice PAC
- Reclaim Chicago
- United Working Families
- Wheeling Township Democrats

Elected officials

- Alma E. Anaya, Cook County Board commissioner
- Danny K. Davis, U.S. representative for Illinois' 7th district
- Tammy Duckworth, U.S. senator for Illinois
- Dick Durbin, U.S. senator for Illinois
- Jesús "Chuy" García, U.S. representative for Illinois' 4th district
- Edgar González Jr., Illinois state representative for the 21st district
- Kamala Harris, U.S. senator for California and candidate in the 2020 Democratic Party presidential primary election
- Amy Klobuchar, U.S. senator for Minnesota and candidate in the 2020 Democratic Party presidential primary election
- Daniel La Spata, Chicago alderman for the 1st ward
- Lori Lightfoot, mayor of Chicago
- Toni Preckwinkle, Cook County Board president
- J. B. Pritzker, governor of Illinois
- Delia Ramirez, Illinois state representative for the 4th district
- Michael Rodriguez, Chicago alderman for the 22nd ward
- Bobby Rush, U.S. representative for Illinois' 1st district
- Bernie Sanders, U.S. senator for Vermont and candidate in the 2020 Democratic Party presidential primary election
- Jan Schakowsky, U.S. representative for Illinois' 9th district
- Brad Schneider, U.S. representative for Illinois' 10th district
- Celina Villanueva, Illinois state senator for the 11th district
- Elizabeth Warren, U.S. senator for Massachusetts and candidate in the 2020 Democratic Party presidential primary election

Individuals

- John Legend, musician and activist
Donna More

Newspapers

- Chicago Tribune
- Daily Herald

=== Polls for the Democratic primary ===
Poll source	Date(s) administered	Sample size	Margin of error	Bill Conway	Bob Fioretti	Kim Foxx	Donna More	Undecided
WGN-TV/Emerson College/Nexstar	March 11–12, 2020	567	± 4.1	20.3%	4.3%	36.3%	4.8%	34.2%
Ogden & Fry	March 7, 2020	466	± 4.63	31.7%	9.0%	48.2%	11.1%	–
Ogden & Fry	March 7, 2020	466	± 4.63	19.5%	4.2%	33.0%	5.8%	37.5%
Anzalone Liszt Grove Research	February 13–16, 2020	600	± 4.0	26%	5%	28%	4%	
Anzalone Liszt Grove Research	January 22, 2020			16%	8%	32%	5%	
Anzalone Liszt Grove Research	December 8, 2019			14%	11%	36%	6%	

=== Results of the Democratic primary ===
Cook County state's attorney Democratic primary
Party	Candidate	Votes	%
Democratic	Kim Foxx (incumbent)	447,974	50.19
Democratic	Bill Conway	276,341	30.96
Democratic	Donna More	122,528	13.73
Democratic	Bob Fioretti	44,794	5.02
Write-in	Others	955	0.11
Total votes		892,592	100

== Republican primary ==
Pat O'Brien defeated Christopher Pfannkuche. Pfannkuche had been the Republican nominee for state's attorney in 2016.

=== Candidates in the Republican primary ===
The following candidates ran for the Republican party nomination for state's attorney:

Candidate	Experience	Campaign	Ref
Pat O'Brien	Former Judge, Cook County Circuit Court 1st Municipal District	Website	
Christopher Pfannkuche	Lawyer	Website	

Write-in candidates

- Richard Mayers, perennial candidate and alleged white supremacist, write-in candidate for Chicago mayor, city clerk, treasurer, and alderman in 2019; congressional candidate in 2000, 2002, 2008, 2016, 2018, and 2020; 1998 State House candidate; 1993 Berwyn city clerk and city treasurer candidate; write-in candidate for U.S. senator in 2020; write-in candidate in 2020 Illinois Republican presidential primary

=== Endorsements for the Republican primary ===
Pat O'Brien

Newspapers

- Chicago Sun-Times
- Daily Herald
Christopher Pfannkuche

Newspapers

- Chicago Tribune

Organizations

- Fraternal Order of Police Chicago Lodge #7

=== Results of the Republican primary ===
Cook County state's attorney Republican primary
Party	Candidate	Votes	%
Republican	Patrick W. "Pat" O'Brien	51,610	72.53
Republican	Christopher E. K. Pfannkuche	19,122	26.87
Write-in	Richard Mayers	1	0.00
Write-in	Others	426	0.60
Total votes		71,159	100

== General election ==
=== Polls for the general election ===
Poll source	Date(s) administered	Sample size	Margin of error	Kim Foxx	Pat O'Brien	Undecided
Ogden & Fry / Cook County Republican Party (Note: The Cook County Republican Party nominated O'Brien prior to the sampling period.)	October 18, 2020	473	± 3.69	47.1%	40.6%	9.8%
Ogden & Fry	September 5, 2020	447	± 3.77	48.1%	33.8%	18.1%

=== Endorsements for the general election ===
Kim Foxx (D)

Organizations

- AFSCME Council 31
- Chicago Federation of Labor
- Chicago Painter's Local 147
- Chicago Teachers Union
- Citizen's Action Illinois
- Color of Change
- Cook County Democratic Party
- Council of Carpenters
- Democratic Party of Evanston
- EMILY's List
- Equality Illinois
- Independent Voters of Illinois Independent Precinct Organization
- International Brotherhood of Teamsters
- The People's Lobby
- Personal PAC
- Real Justice PAC
- Reclaim Chicago
- SEIU Healthcare IL/IN
- SEIU Local 73
- United Working Families
- Wheeling Township Democrats

Politicians

- Chicago City Council Progressive Reform Caucus, including aldermen Daniel La Spata (1st ward); Sophia King (4); Leslie Hairston (5); Roderick Sawyer (6); Susan Sadlowski Garza (10); Stephanie Coleman (16); David Moore (17); Jeanette Taylor (20); Michael Rodriguez (22); Byron Sigcho-Lopez (25); Chris Taliaferro (29); Rossana Rodríguez-Sánchez (33); Carlos Ramirez-Rosa (35); Felix Cardona Jr. (31); Scott Waguespack (32); Andre Vasquez (40); Matt Martin (47); and Maria Hadden (49)
- Alma E. Anaya, Cook County Board commissioner
- Danny K. Davis, U.S. representative for Illinois' 7th district
- Tammy Duckworth, U.S. senator for Illinois
- Dick Durbin, U.S. senator for Illinois
- Jesús "Chuy" García, U.S. representative for Illinois' 4th district
- Edgar González Jr., Illinois state representative for the 21st district
- Kamala Harris, U.S. senator for California and Democratic vice presidential nominee
- Robin Kelly, U.S. representative for Illinois' 2nd district
- Amy Klobuchar, U.S. senator for Minnesota and candidate in the 2020 Democratic Party presidential primary election
- Lori Lightfoot, mayor of Chicago
- Toni Preckwinkle, Cook County Board president
- J. B. Pritzker, governor of Illinois
- Delia Ramirez, Illinois state representative for the 4th district
- Michael Rodriguez, Chicago alderman for the 22nd ward
- Bobby Rush, U.S. representative for Illinois' 1st district
- Bernie Sanders, U.S. senator for Vermont and candidate in the 2020 Democratic Party presidential primary election
- Jan Schakowsky, U.S. representative for Illinois' 9th district
- Brad Schneider, U.S. representative for Illinois' 10th district
- Celina Villanueva, Illinois state senator for the 11th district
- Elizabeth Warren, U.S. senator for Massachusetts and candidate in the 2020 Democratic Party presidential primary election

Individuals

- John Legend, singer and activist

Newspapers

- Chicago Sun-Times
Pat O'Brien (R)

Politicians

- Brendan Reilly, Chicago alderman for the 42nd ward (Democratic)

Newspapers

- Chicago Tribune
- Daily Herald

=== Results of the general election ===
Cook County state's attorney election
Party	Candidate	Votes	%	±%
Democratic	Kim Foxx (incumbent)	1,194,299	54.21	−17.85
Republican	Patrick W. "Pat" O'Brien	861,108	39.08	+11.14
Libertarian	Brian Dennehy	147,769	6.71	N/A
Total votes		2,203,176	100	

Kim Fox's performance 54.21% vote share was the lowest performance by a Democratic nominee in a Cook County state's attorney election since 1996. It was also the worst that a re-nominated incumbent has performed in a general election for Cook County state's attorney since the same election, which saw Republican incumbent Jack O'Malley lose reelection. Conversely, O'Brien's 39.08% share of the vote was the best performance by a Republican since 1996, and Dennehy's 6.71% share of the vote was best performance by as third-party candidate since 1996.

Only Democrats have held this office ever since Richard A. Devine unseated Republican Jack O'Malley.

== See also ==
- 2020 Cook County, Illinois, elections
- 2020 Illinois elections
