= Bob Fioretti =

American politician

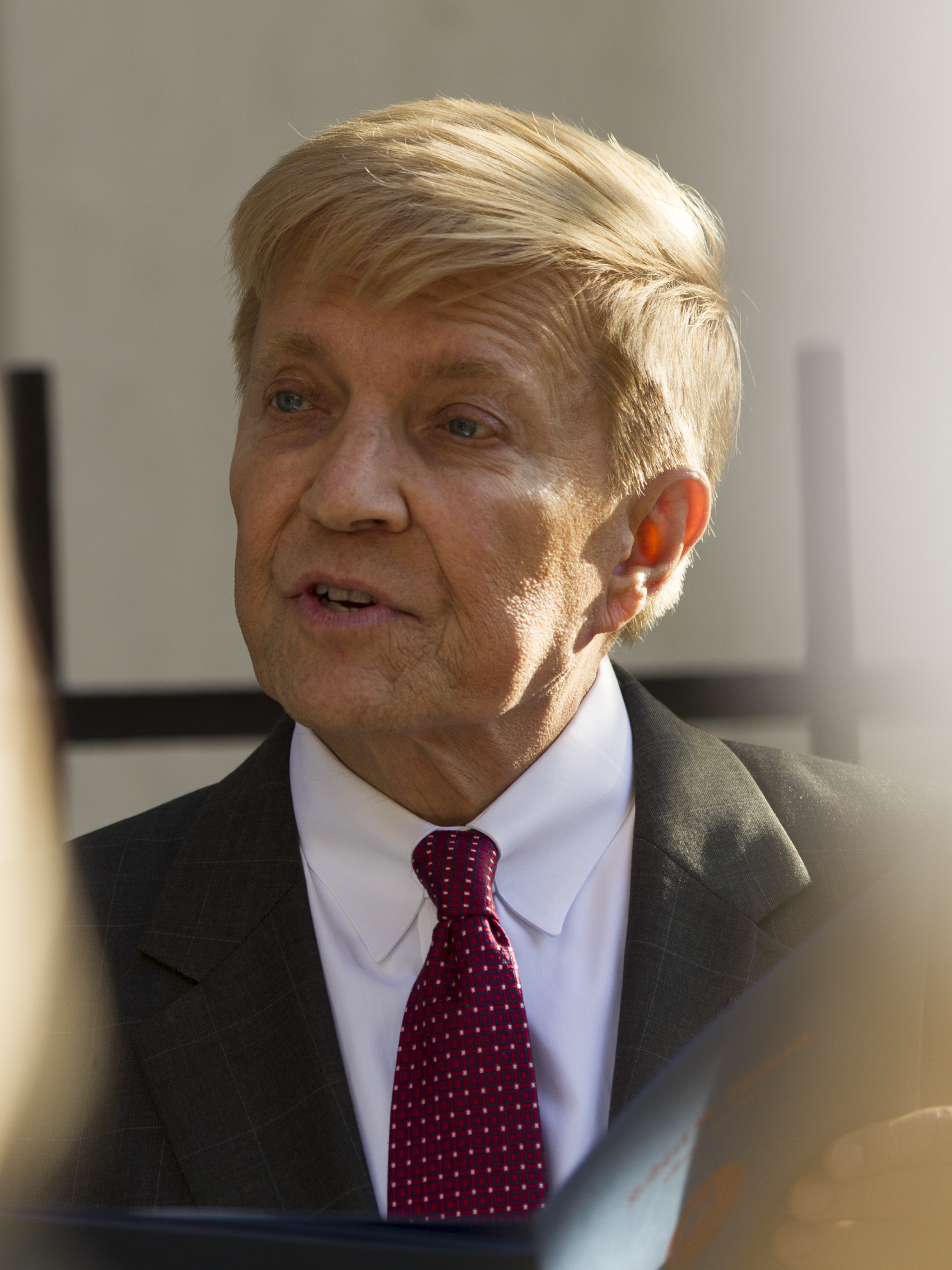
- Fioretti in 2015

Member of the Chicago City Council from the 2nd ward
- In office May 21, 2007 – May 18, 2015
- Preceded by: Madeline Haithcock
- Succeeded by: Brian K. Hopkins

Personal details
- Born: Robert William Fioretti; March 8, 1953 (age 73) Chicago, Illinois, U.S.
- Party: Democratic (before 2022); Republican (2022–present)
- Spouse: Nicki Fioretti
- Education: University of Illinois, Urbana-Champaign (BA); Northern Illinois University (JD)

Robert William Fioretti (born March 8, 1953) is an American attorney and politician who served as an alderman in the Chicago City Council for the 2nd ward, which included portions of Bronzeville, East Garfield Park, Illinois Medical District, Little Italy, Loop, Near West Side, Prairie District, South Loop, University Village, Westhaven, and West Loop. Fioretti first won election as alderman in 2007 and was re-elected in 2011. He also served as 2nd ward Democratic Committeeman for two terms, which is a position in the Cook County Democratic Party.

When ward boundaries were re-drawn after the 2010 Census, the original area in the 2nd ward was divided into several wards, and Fioretti did not run for re-election.

Since leaving City Council, Fioretti has unsuccessfully run for several other elected offices. He also successfully represented Dolton mayor Tiffany Henyard in a lawsuit to invalidate an attempted recall vote against her.

== Background/education ==
Fioretti was born and raised in Chicago's Pullman and Roseland neighborhoods. He is the son of a Polish-American mother and an Italian immigrant father who moved to Chicago and worked for the Pullman train car company. Fioretti attended St. Anthony's Grammar School and Mendel High School on the South Side of Chicago. He received a Pullman Foundation scholarship to attend the University of Illinois, where he studied political science and served as student body president.

Fioretti earned his J.D. degree from Northern Illinois University College of Law, where he remains a member of the adjunct faculty. He serves on the Law School Alumni Council and the NIU Board of Visitors. He previously served as president of the NIU National Alumni Association from 2000 to 2004. During his tenure as president, Fioretti oversaw the establishment of a Chicago alumni office, the formation of a quarterly alumni magazine, and the creation of the Barsema Alumni Center on campus, created the law student travel overseas program, and helped establish a scholarship endowment program. Fioretti also served as president of the NIU College of Law Alumni Council.

== Personal life ==
Fioretti currently lives on Chicago’s Near West Side, with his wife, Nicki.

Fioretti survived throat cancer, which he was diagnosed with in late-2010. In 2019 Fioretti published, "My Cancer Journey: In Seven Parts." Fioretti described the book by stating, "You now belong to a club where no one wants to be a member. Words no one wants to hear. But there is nothing you negotiate to get out of it once it happens to you. My Cancer Journey chronicles what I, and my wife, Nicki, went through from my diagnosis to treatment, recovery and our new normal today."

== Legal career ==
Fioretti, a civil rights lawyer, is a partner in the law firm Roth Fioretti LLC in Chicago, where he practices governmental law and complex litigation. He has litigated cases before federal and state administrative law judges as well as in the state and federal courts. He is a former Senior Supervising Attorney of the General Litigation Division for the Corporation Counsel for the City of Chicago, working with Mayor Harold Washington during the time of Council Wars. Fioretti has been appointed in numerous cases as a Special Assistant Attorney General of Illinois and a Special Assistant State's Attorney.

In 2006 Fioretti was the attorney for LaFonso Rollins, a young African American sentenced to 75 years in jail for rape. Rollins had spent 11 years in prison before being exonerated in 2004 by DNA testing. He was awarded a $9 million settlement in a wrongful conviction lawsuit against the City of Chicago.

He represented the family of Baby Tamia in an interstate adoption case that led to changes in Illinois adoption law. This adoption case spurred legislation in Illinois, providing sweeping protections for birth parents and established the state as a model for adoption reform. Previously Illinois adoption law has been discriminatory against poor families of color involved in the adoption process.

In 2022, Fioretti successfully represented Dolton, Illinois Mayor Tiffany Henyard in her lawsuit to block the certification of an attempted recall election against her. A Cook County Circuit Court judge ruled that it was improper to, on the same ballot, ask both whether the town should create a previously-nonexistent recall mechanism and whether it should use said mechanism to remove Henyard.

== Aldermanic career ==
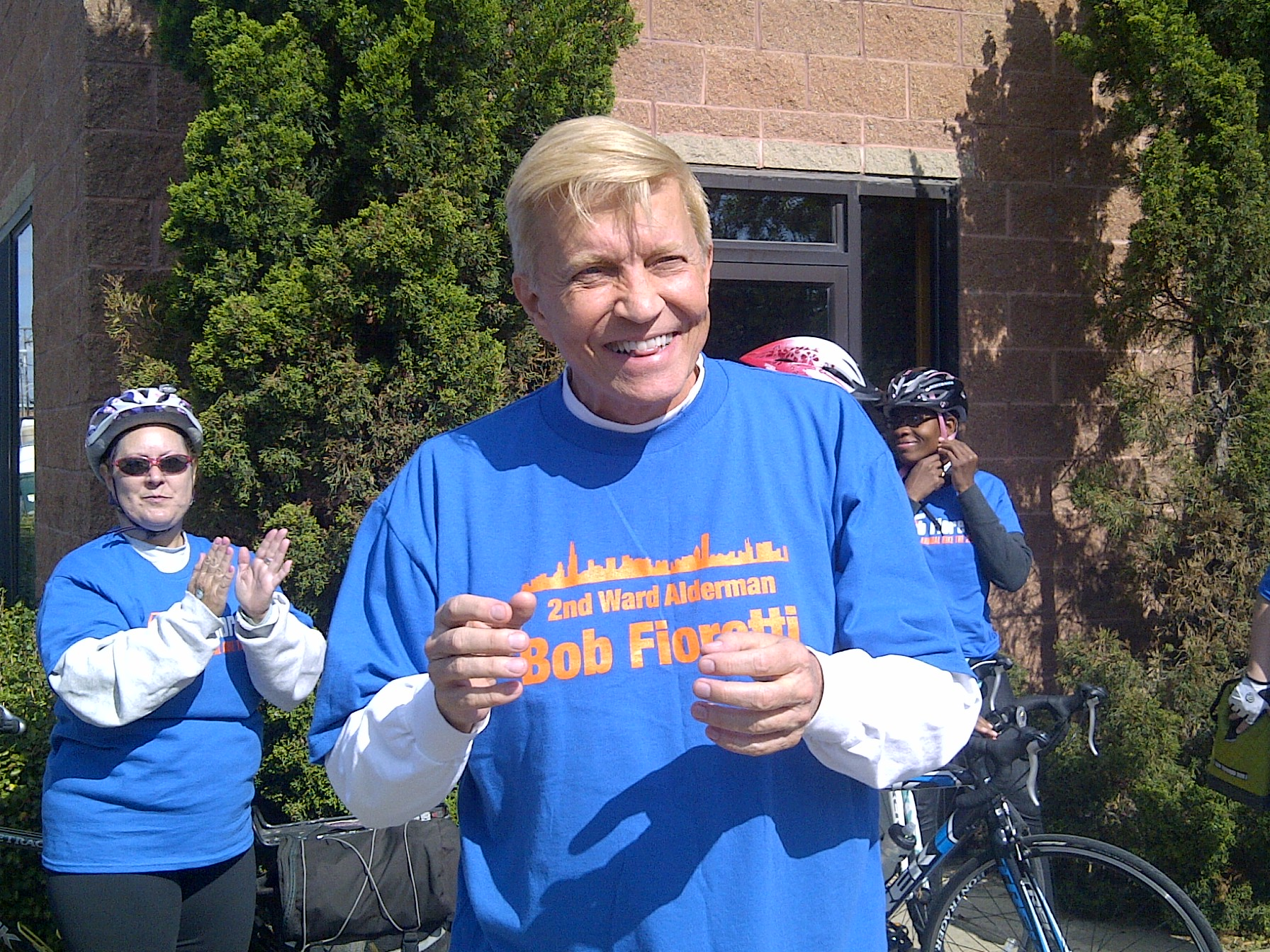
Fioretti guiding a cycling tour of his ward in September 2014

In 2007, Fioretti ran for Alderman of Chicago's 2nd ward, challenging 14-year incumbent Madeline Haithcock. He secured the most votes in the February primary and forced a run-off with Haithcock. In the run-off, Fioretti defeated Haithcock, by nearly a two-to-one margin. Fioretti took office on May 21, 2007. In 2011, Fioretti was re-elected to a second term. Following that election, Fioretti's colleagues. along with the Mayor, agreed to a re-districting map that left Fioretti with none of his original ward. Fioretti was one of only two Aldermen to so lose their ward. Fioretti subsequently chose to run for election as Mayor.

Fioretti had come into conflict with mayor Rahm Emanuel many times, including over siding with a successful resistance to Emanuel's efforts to move the water fee exemption for some nonprofits and religious groups in the city's budget and unsuccessfully opposing the licensing of rideshare companies such as Uber and Lyft.

=== Education and jobs ===
Since taking office, Fioretti has prioritized education and job creation in his legislative agenda. Fioretti has attempted to improve the Chicago Public School system, working closely with administrators to solve issues both in and out of the classroom. In 2008, Fioretti helped to create "Operation Safe Passage," an initiative designed to protect students on the way to and from school that coordinated the resources of the Chicago Police Department, the CTA, local faith-based institutions, and families. Fioretti supported the expansion of Jones College Prep High School and oversaw Roosevelt University's expansion into Chicago's South Loop. In 2011, Fioretti won the "Defender of Public Education" Award from the Chicago Teachers Union, AFT Local 1 for his efforts at modernizing and sustaining neighborhood schools.

Fioretti has facilitated the creation and preservation of jobs in Chicago. He supported the relocation of the United Airlines headquarters, bringing approximately 2,500 jobs from Elk Grove to Chicago. Fioretti also led the effort to renovate and expand the Chicago Mercantile Exchange to keep the world's largest futures and options exchange as an anchor of Chicago's financial district.

Fioretti has also led efforts to combat the problem of "food deserts" on Chicago's West Side by working to bring low-cost food retailers into previously under-served neighborhoods. Pete's Fresh Market, Target, and Costco have agreed to open new locations within the 2nd ward, providing food retailers and jobs to West Side residents.

=== Parks ===
For his efforts to improve and expand parks in the 2nd ward, Fioretti received the 2009 "Legislator of the Year" award from Friends of the Parks, a non-profit, Chicago-based park advocacy group. During his tenure as alderman, Fioretti has budgeted city resources to open several new parks in the 2nd ward.

However, he alienated parks groups when he voted to allow the Chicago Children's Museum to relocate to Grant Park. That move was later challenged in court and Mayor Daley later withdrew the plan and the museum remained at Navy Pier.

=== Council activities ===
Fioretti served on five committees in Chicago's city council: Environmental Protection & Public Utilities, Health, License & Consumer Protection, Rules & Ethics, and Special Events.

== Pursuits of higher office ==
=== Chicago mayoral candidacies ===
Fioretti twice ran for Mayor of Chicago. Fioretti had originally been considering a bid for mayor in the 2011 Chicago mayoral election, but canceled these plans after his diagnosis with throat cancer. He would later run in next two mayoral elections (2015 and 2019).

==== 2015 mayoral campaign ====
Fioretti was an unsuccessful candidate in the 2015 Chicago mayoral election.

Fioretti enjoyed support from former Chicago Bears coach Mike Ditka and withdrawn candidate Amara Enyia, as well as endorsements from the Chicago Police Sergeants Association, the Green Party of Chicago, and the Progressive Caucus of the Chicago City Council.

Fioretti ultimately placed fourth of five candidates in the initial round of the election, with 35,363 votes, equal to 7.39% of the overall vote. Having been eliminated, Fioretti endorsed Rahm Emanuel in the runoff.

==== 2019 mayoral campaign ====
On November 26, 2018, Fioretti announced his candidacy for mayor in the 2019 election to replace Rahm Emanuel. He was again unsuccessful in his pursuit of Chicago mayoralty. Fioretti placed twelfth of fourteen candidates, with 4,302 votes, equal to 0.77% of the overall vote.

=== Cook County offices ===
==== 2018 Cook County Board President campaign ====
In November 2017, he announced that he would challenge incumbent Toni Preckwinkle for the Democratic nomination for President of the Cook County Board of Commissioners. Fioretti lost to Preckwinkle in the March 20, 2018 Democratic primary.

==== 2020 Cook County State's Attorney campaign ====
Fioretti was one of several candidates challenging incumbent Cook County State's Attorney Kim Foxx in the 2020 Democratic primary. He confirmed his candidacy to the Chicago Tribune on November 22, 2019, and formally announced his candidacy on December 2, 2019. His candidacy was endorsed by Fraternal Order of Police Chicago Lodge #7. He placed fourth in the primary.

==== 2022 Cook County Board President campaign ====
Fioretti ran as the Republican nominee for President of the Cook County Board of Commissioners, once again challenging Preckwinkle, whom he lost to in the 2018 Democratic primary for the seat. Fioretti once again was defeated by Preckwinkle.

==== 2024 Cook County State's Attorney campaign ====
Fioretti is running for Cook County State's Attorney again, as the lone Republican candidate.

Fioretti ran against Democratic nominee Eileen O'Neill Burke, a former judge of the Illinois Appellate Court who vacated her judicial position in order to run for state's attorney. Burke went on to beat Fioretti by a margin of 37%. During his campaign, Fioretti received an endorsement from Jesse Jackson Sr.

=== State Senate ===
In 2016, Fioretti unsuccessfully challenged incumbent Patricia Van Pelt for the Democratic nomination for the 5th district of Illinois Senate.

=== State Attorney General ===
In October 2025, Fioretti announced his candidacy for Illinois Attorney General in the upcoming 2026 election, challenging Democratic incumbent Kwame Raoul.

== Electoral history ==
2007 Chicago 2nd ward aldermanic election
Candidates	General Election		Run-off Election	
	Votes	%	Votes	%
Bob Fioretti	3,075	27.70	6,175	65.70
Madeline L. Haithcock	2,319	20.89	3,224	34.30
David R. Askew	1,756	15.82		
Kenny Johnson	1,570	14.14		
Larry Doody	1,284	11.56		
Wallace Davis, Jr.	1,099	9.90		
Total	11,103	100	9,399	100

2011 Chicago 2nd ward aldermanic election
Candidate	Votes	%
Bob Fioretti (incumbent)	8,028	54.94
Genita C. Robinson	4,484	30.69
Melissa Callahan	666	4.56
Enrique G. Perez	648	4.44
Federico Sciammarella	623	4.26
James A. Bosco	162	1.11
Total votes	14,611	100

2015 Chicago mayoral election
Candidates	General Election		Run-off Election	
	Votes	%	Votes	%
Rahm Emanuel	218,217	45.63	332,171	56.23
Jesús "Chuy" García	160,414	33.55	258,562	43.77
Willie Wilson	50,960	10.66		
Robert W. Fioretti	35,363	7.39		
William Walls III	13,250	2.77		
Total	478,204	100	573,524	100

2018 Cook County Board President Democratic primary
Party	Candidate	Votes	%
Democratic	Toni Preckwinkle (incumbent)	444,943	60.82
Democratic	Bob Fioretti	286,675	39.18
Total votes		731,618	100

2016 Illinois State Senate 5th district Democratic primary
Party	Candidate	Votes	%
Democratic	Patricia Van Pelt (incumbent)	33,123	67.85
Democratic	Robert "Bob" Fioretti	15,696	32.15
Total votes		48,819	100

2019 Chicago mayoral election
Candidates	General Election		Run-off Election	
	Votes	%	Votes	%
Lori Lightfoot	97,667	17.54	386,039	73.70
Toni Preckwinkle	89,343	16.04	137,765	26.30
William Daley	82,294	14.78		
Willie Wilson	59,072	10.61		
Susana Mendoza	50,373	9.05		
Amara Enyia	44,589	8.00		
Jerry Joyce	40,099	7.20		
Gery Chico	34,521	6.20		
Paul Vallas	30,236	5.43		
Garry McCarthy	14,784	2.66		
La Shawn K. Ford	5,606	1.01		
Robert "Bob" Fioretti	4,302	0.77		
John Kolzar	2,349	0.42		
Neal Sales-Griffin	1,523	0.27		
Write-ins	86	0.02		
Total	556,844	100	523,804	100

2020 Cook County State’s Attorney Democratic primary
Party	Candidate	Votes	%
Democratic	Kim Foxx (incumbent)	447,974	50.19
Democratic	Bill Conway	276,341	30.96
Democratic	Donna More	122,528	13.73
Democratic	Bob Fioretti	44,794	5.02
Write-in	Others	955	0.11
Total votes		892,592	100

2022 President of the Cook County Board of Commissioners election
Party	Candidate	Votes	%
Democratic	Toni Preckwinkle (incumbent)	967,062	68.54
Republican	Bob Fioretti	399,339	28.30
Libertarian	Thea Tsatsos	44,615	3.16
Total votes		1,441,016	100

Party political offices
Preceded by Tom DeVore	Republican nominee for Attorney General of Illinois; 2026	Most recent
