= Abdelnasser Rashid =

American politician

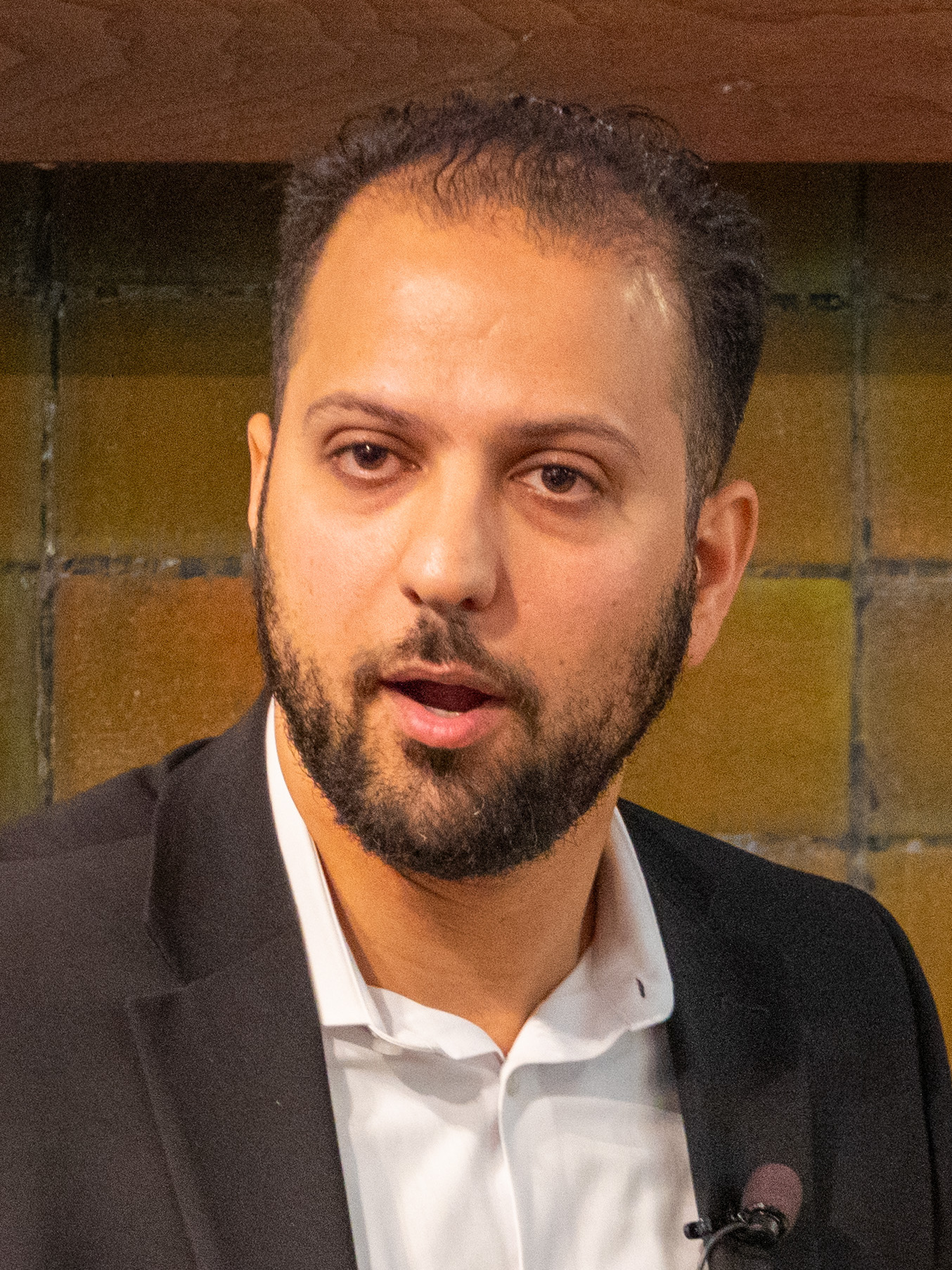
- Rashid in 2025

Member of the Illinois House of Representatives from the 21st district
- Incumbent
- Assumed office January 11, 2023
- Preceded by: Edgar Gonzalez Jr. (redistricted)

Personal details
- Born: July 24, 1989 (age 37) Chicago, Illinois, U.S.
- Party: Democratic
- Education: Harvard University (BA); University of Chicago (MBA)

Abdelnasser Rashid (born July 24, 1989) is an American politician serving as a member of the Illinois House of Representatives for the 21st district since 2023. A Democrat, Rashid defeated redistricted incumbent Michael J. Zalewski in the primary election. The district includes Chicago's Southwest Side and southwest suburbs, including all or parts of Bedford Park, Berwyn, Bridgeview, Brookfield, Cicero, Countryside, Hodgkins, Justice, La Grange, Riverside, and Summit.

Rashid is the first Palestinian-American to serve in the Illinois General Assembly and, along with Nabeela Syed, one of its first two Muslim members.

== Early life and education ==
Rashid was born in Chicago, Illinois. He holds a Bachelor of Arts from Harvard University and a Master of Business Administration in Finance and Economics from the University of Chicago's Booth School of Business.

== Career ==
Rashid worked on Chuy García's 2015 mayoral campaign and on the Bernie Sanders 2016 presidential campaign. He also served as deputy chief of staff to Cook County Clerk David Orr for two years.

In 2018, Rashid unsuccessfully ran for Cook County Commission for the 17th district, narrowly losing to Republican incumbent Sean M. Morrison by 1.14% of the vote. In 2020, he unsuccessfully ran for Cook County Board of Review. Rashid was re-elected to the Illinois House of Representatives in 2024.

Rashid has passed more than ten laws and was appointed to co-chair Illinois' AI Task Force. He received the Illinois Environmental Council's 2025 Milestone Achievement Award for his bill HB2516, which phases out cancer-linked per- and polyfluoroalkyl substances (PFAS) from consumer products.

== Electoral history ==
Illinois 21st Representative Democratic Primary, 2022
Party	Candidate	Votes	%
Democratic	Abdelnasser Rashid	4,214	52.3
Democratic	Michael Zalewski	3,838	47.7
Total votes		22,059	100.0

Illinois 21st Representative District General Election, 2022
Party	Candidate	Votes	%
Democratic	Abdelnasser Rashid	14,800	65.9
Republican	Matthew Schultz	7,644	34.1
Total votes		49,609	100.0
