= 2026 Illinois Attorney General election =

- November 3, 2026
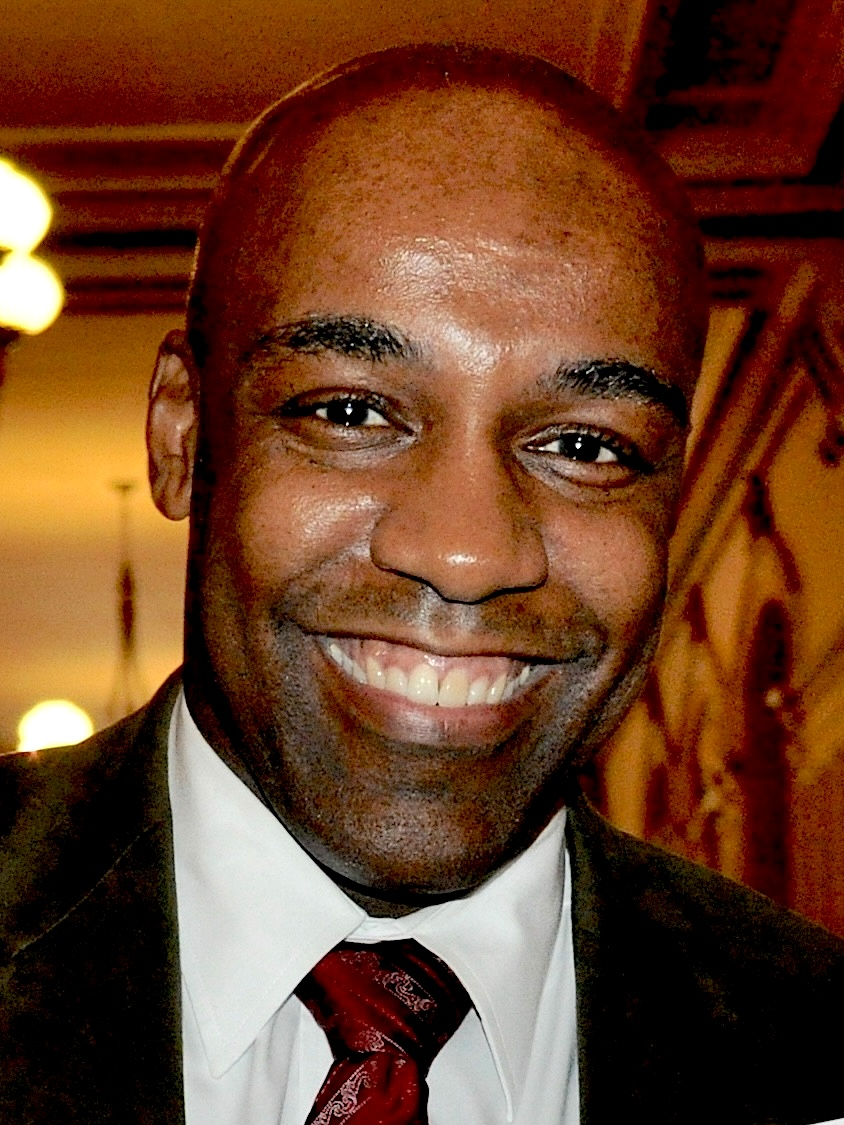

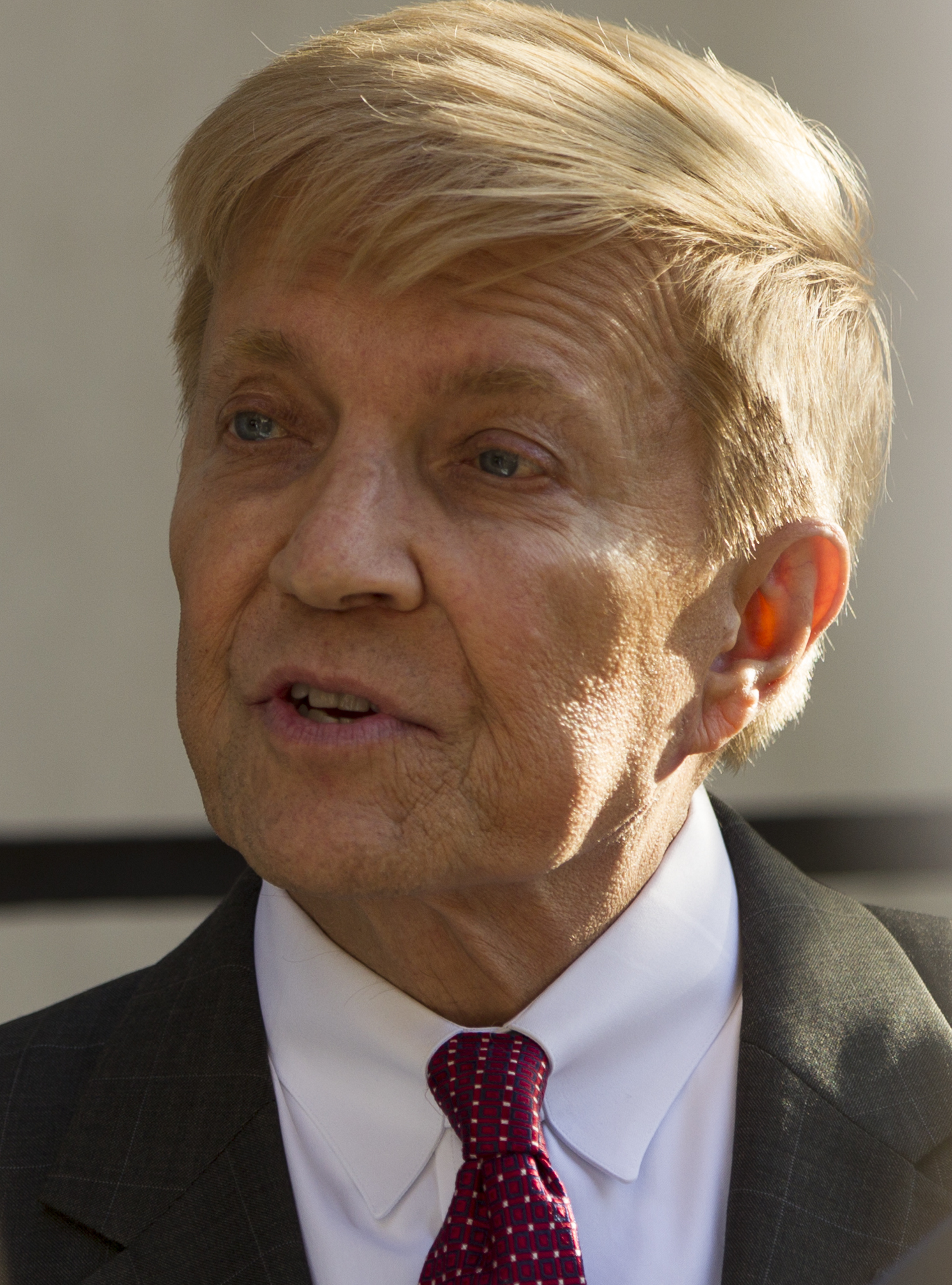
Nominee	Kwame Raoul	Bob Fioretti
Party	Democratic	Republican
Popular vote	2,506,661	1,560,740
Percentage	61.6%	38.4%
Attorney General before election
Kwame Raoul
Democratic
Elected Attorney General
Kwame Raoul
Democratic

The 2026 Illinois Attorney General election was held on November 3, 2026, to elect the Illinois Attorney General. Incumbent Democratic attorney general Kwame Raoul won re-election to a third term in office.

== Democratic primary ==
=== Candidates ===
==== Nominee ====
- Kwame Raoul, incumbent attorney general (2019–present)

=== Endorsements ===
Kwame Raoul

Labor unions

- Chicago Fraternal Order of Police
- Illinois AFL-CIO
- Illinois Fraternal Order of Police
- International Union of Operating Engineers Locals 150 and 399
- SEIU Healthcare
- SEIU Illinois State Council

Organizations

- Reproductive Freedom for All

Political parties

- Cook County Democratic Party
- New Trier Democrats

Newspapers

- The Chicago Crusader

=== Results ===
Democratic primary results
Party	Candidate	Votes	%
Democratic	Kwame Raoul (incumbent)	1,155,998	100.0
Total votes		1,155,998	100.0

== Republican primary ==
=== Candidates ===
==== Declared ====
- Bob Fioretti, former Chicago alderman from the 2nd ward (2007–2015) and perennial candidate

Not on ballot

- JoAnne Guillemette, Democratic candidate for Illinois's 1st congressional district in 2010 and Republican candidate for Illinois's 16th congressional district in 2022
- Andy Williams Jr., minister and candidate for president in 2020

==== Withdrew ====
- Joe Cervantez, former State's Attorney for Jackson County (did not file, endorsed Fioretti)

=== Results ===
Republican primary results
Party	Candidate	Votes	%
Republican	Bob Fioretti	495,600	100.0
Total votes		495,600	100.0

== General election ==
=== Predictions ===
Source	Ranking	As of
Sabato's Crystal Ball	Safe D	August 21, 2025

=== Polling ===
Poll source	Date(s) administered	Sample size (Note: Key: A – all adults RV – registered voters LV – likely voters V – unclear)	Margin of error	Kwame Raoul (D)	Bob Fioretti (R)	Other	Undecided
Public Policy Polling (Note: Poll conducted for Chicago News Weekly.)	September 30 – October 1, 2026	569 (LV)	—	52%	38%	—	11%

=== Results ===
2026 Illinois Attorney General election
Party	Candidate	Votes	%	±%
Democratic	Kwame Raoul (incumbent)			
Republican	Bob Fioretti			
Total votes			100.0	

== Notes ==
Partisan clients

== See also ==
- 2026 Illinois elections
- 2026 United States attorney general elections
- Illinois Attorney General
