= Burton Natarus =

American politician

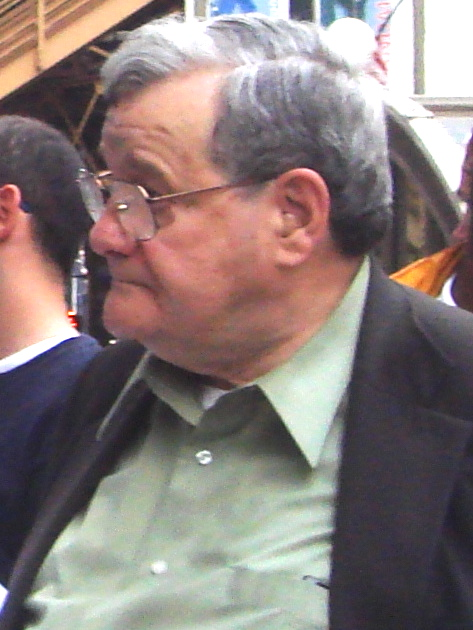
- Natarus in 2007

City of Chicago Alderman
- In office 1971–2007
- Succeeded by: Brendan Reilly
- Constituency: 42d Ward

Personal details
- Born: November 7, 1933 Wausau, Wisconsin, US
- Died: June 11, 2020 (aged 86) Chicago, Illinois, US
- Party: Democratic
- Education: University of Wisconsin; John F. Kennedy School of Government at Harvard

Burton F. "Burt" Natarus (November 7, 1933 – June 11, 2020) was Alderman of the 42nd Ward of Chicago from 1971 to 2007.

== Early life ==
Natarus was born in Wausau, Wisconsin. He graduated from University of Wisconsin in 1956 and University of Wisconsin Law School in 1960. Natarus continued his education at the John F. Kennedy School of Government at Harvard. He was admitted to the Wisconsin bar in 1960 and practiced law in Chicago. Later, he taught at Chicago's Loyola University on the subject of local government. Natarus also served in the U.S. Army and the U.S. Army Reserves, earning paratrooper's "jump wings".

== Public service ==
Natarus was active in a number of community groups: City Club of Chicago, Streeterville Organization of Active Residents, Central Michigan Association, North Dearborn Association, and River North Association.

== Aldermanic career ==
Natarus was a Democrat. Natarus was a protégé of longtime 42nd Ward Democratic Committeeman and Cook County Board President George Dunne.

Natarus was first elected Alderman of the 42nd Ward in 1971. He was re-elected eight times, serving for thirty-six years. The 42nd Ward encompasses some of Chicago's wealthiest neighborhoods, including Streeterville, the Gold Coast, the Magnificent Mile, River North, and the Loop.

Natarus was Chairman of the Traffic and Safety Committee. He also served on six other committees: Finance; Zoning; Committees, Rules and Ethics; License and Consumer Protection; Budget and Government Operations; and Housing and Real Estate. In addition, he was a member of the Chicago Plan Commission, the Central Area Planning Task Force, and the Regional Transportation Task Force.

Natarus' pushed "good government" projects that appealed to his predominantly liberal constituents, such as arts funding, park expansion, and gun control. He became known as the Council's most skilled author of legislation, and was dubbed "the Master of the Ordinance."

Natarus avoided challenging then-Mayor Richard J. Daley and the Party on issues such as corruption, favoritism, racism, and police brutality. He was a reliable vote in favor of the Mayor's budget, and of any zoning changes requested by other Aldermen. The ordinances he crafted often included language that allowed the Mayor to give tax breaks, subsidies, and sweetheart deals to favored business interests. He was consistently supportive of property developers in his ward, and pointed to the vast array of big new buildings there as his accomplishment. In turn developers donated heavily to his campaign fund.

Natarus always supported Democratic Party endorsed candidates for state and county office in Democratic primaries. This continued under Daley's successors, Bilandic and Byrne. However, after Harold Washington won the Democratic nomination for Mayor, and subsequently the Mayoralty itself, in 1983, Natarus supported Washington (who was black) in the racially charged "Council Wars" that followed. After Washington's death and eventual replacement by Richard M. Daley, Natarus was as loyal to the son as he had been to his father. When Dunne finally retired as Ward Committeeman in 2003 precinct captains selected Natarus as his replacement.

Natarus' son owns an architectural metal company that was among the vendors for the build-out of the Park Grill restaurant in Millennium Park.

In 1989, he opposed legislation championed by Daley to create a watchdog to oversee all of city government. He argued that the fact that aldermen had previously been charged with felonies, "indicates the system works as is." The ordinance later passed, but with revisions that made alderman exempted from the new inspector general's oversight.

== Defeat ==
By 2006, Natarus had developed hostile relations with some members of the press. At times he responded to criticism with vulgar language or angry harangues. He had also lost the support of important labor unions, notably the SEIU.

In 2007, Natarus sought re-election for a tenth term. Observers noted that Natarus barely campaigned, missing several events at which he was to share a podium with challenger Brendan Reilly. The SEIU and other unions backed Reilly. Natarus was defeated in the General Election of February 27 by 8.6%.

In 2007, Natarus had a red light camera installed "near his condo in an intersection that had virtually no accidents".

In 2019, the Chicago Tribune inadvertently reported Natarus as dead.

== Personal life ==
Natarus had two children, Jill, Ellen, and Michael, and one grandchild, Jacob. He died on June 5, 2020, at the age of 86.
