= Silvana Tabares =

American politician

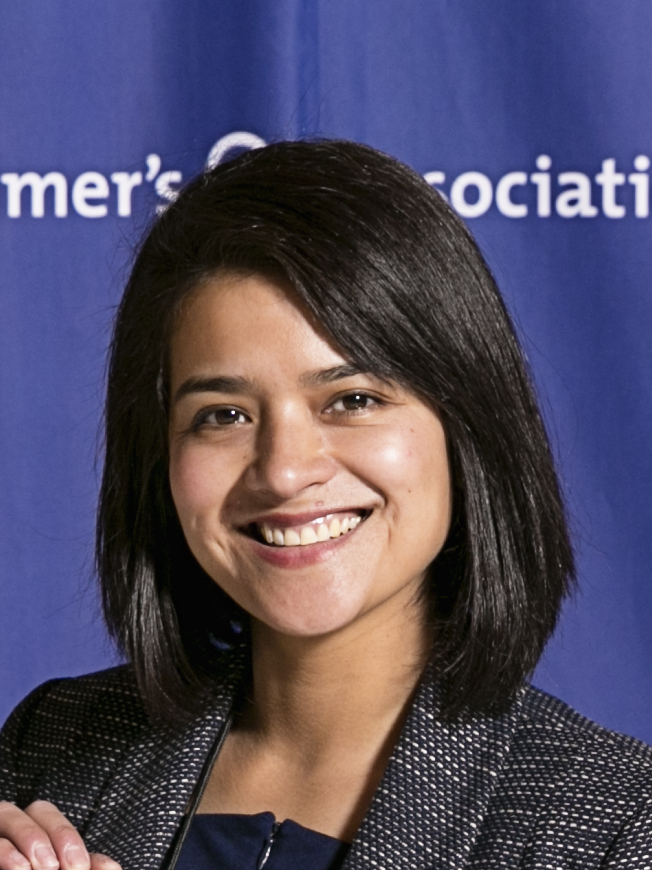
- Tabares in 2014

Member of the Chicago City Council from the 23rd ward
- Incumbent
- Assumed office June 28, 2018
- Preceded by: Mike Zalewski

Member of the Illinois House of Representatives from the 21st district
- In office January 2013 – June 2018
- Preceded by: Mike Zalewski (Redistricted)
- Succeeded by: Celina Villanueva

Personal details
- Born: January 7, 1979 (age 47)
- Party: Democratic
- Education: Columbia College Chicago (BA)

Silvana Tabares (born January 7, 1979) is a member of the Chicago City Council from the 23rd ward. Prior to her June 15, 2018, appointment to the City Council, she had served in the Illinois House of Representatives representing the 21st district since January 2013.

== State House career ==
Being sworn in in January 2013, she served in the Illinois House of Representatives representing the 21st district. Said district includes all or parts of the Chicago neighborhoods of Archer Heights, Brighton Park, Garfield Ridge, McKinley Park, South Lawndale and the Lower West Side along with the nearby suburbs of Stickney, Forest View, Lyons, Riverside, Summit and Bedford Park

During her time in the Illinois House of Representatives, she was viewed as an ally of Speaker Michael Madigan.

Celina Villanueva was appointed to succeed Tabares in the Illinois House of Representatives upon Tabares resignation to accept an appointment to the Chicago City Council.

In 2016, Tabares was a presidential elector from Illinois.

== Aldermanic career ==
Tabares was appointed by Mayor Rahm Emanuel to replace retiring 23rd Ward alderman Michael R. Zalewski on the Chicago City Council. She took office June 28, 2018.

Tabares was elected to a full term as alderman in 2019.

== See also ==
- List of Chicago alderpersons since 1923
