= Michael J. Zalewski =

American politician

Michael Zalewski

Member of the Illinois House of Representatives from the 23rd district
- In office January 9, 2013 – January 11, 2023
- Preceded by: Daniel J. Burke (redistricted)
- Succeeded by: Edgar Gonzalez Jr. (redistricted)

Member of the Illinois House of Representatives from the 21st district
- In office December 2008 – January 9, 2013
- Preceded by: Robert S. Molaro
- Succeeded by: Silvana Tabares (redistricted)

Personal details
- Born: Chicago, Illinois, U.S.
- Party: Democratic
- Spouse: Carrie
- Relatives: Michael R. Zalewski (father)
- Education: University of Illinois, Urbana-Champaign (BA); John Marshall Law School (JD)

Michael J. Zalewski is an American politician who served in the Illinois House of Representatives from December 2008 to January 2023. He represented District 23, located in the Chicago metropolitan area. He lost his bid to represent District 21 to Abdelnasser Rashid in the 2022 Democratic primary election.

His father is Michael R. Zalewski, a former Chicago city alderman.

== Electoral history ==
Illinois 21st Representative District General Election, 2008
Party	Candidate	Votes	%
Democratic	Michael J. Zalewski	27,329	68.90
Republican	Charles "Charlie" Johnson	8,872	22.37
Green	Rita Maniotis	3,464	8.73
Total votes		39,665	100.0

Illinois 21st Representative District Democratic Primary, 2010
Party	Candidate	Votes	%
Democratic	Michael J. Zalewski (incumbent)	8,978	72.32
Democratic	Terrence J. Collins	3,437	27.68
Total votes		12,415	100.0

Illinois 21st Representative District General Election, 2010
Party	Candidate	Votes	%	±%
Democratic	Michael J. Zalewski (incumbent)	21,850	100.0	+31.10%
Total votes		21,850	100.0	

Illinois 23rd Representative District General Election, 2012
Party	Candidate	Votes	%
Democratic	Michael J. Zalewski	19,513	100.0
Total votes		19,513	100.0

Illinois 23rd Representative District General Election, 2014
Party	Candidate	Votes	%
Democratic	Michael J. Zalewski (incumbent)	13,244	100.0
Total votes		13,244	100.0

Illinois 23rd Representative District General Election, 2016
Party	Candidate	Votes	%
Democratic	Michael J. Zalewski (incumbent)	25,097	100.0
Total votes		25,097	100.0

Illinois 23rd Representative District General Election, 2018
Party	Candidate	Votes	%
Democratic	Michael J. Zalewski (incumbent)	19,161	100.0
Total votes		19,161	100.0

Illinois 23rd Representative District General Election, 2020
Party	Candidate	Votes	%
Democratic	Michael J. Zalewski (incumbent)	26,817	100.0
Total votes		26,817	100.0

Illinois 21st Representative District Democratic Primary, 2022
Party	Candidate	Votes	%
Democratic	Abdelnasser Rashid	4,214	52.33
Democratic	Michael J. Zalewski	3,838	47.67
Total votes		8,052	100.0
