= 2016 Illinois judicial elections =

- November 8, 2016

The 2016 Illinois judicial elections consisted of both partisan and retention elections, including those for seven seats in the Illinois Appellate Court. Primary elections were held on March 15, 2016, and general elections were held on November 8, 2016. These elections were part of the 2016 Illinois elections.

== Illinois Appellate Court ==
Illinois Appellate Court justices hold ten-year terms.

=== 1st district (4th division) ===
A vacancy was created after the retirement of Stuart Palmer. Democrat Eileen O'Neill Burke was elected to fill it, running unopposed in both the Democratic primary and general election. This was a regular election, as Palmer's term would have expired in 2016.

==== Democratic primary ====
Illinois Appellate Court 1st district (4th division) Democratic primary
| Party | Candidate | Votes | % |
|---|---|---|---|
| Democratic | Eileen O'Neill Burke (incumbent) | 805,190 | 100 |
| Total votes | | 805,190 | 100 |

==== Republican primary ====
The Republican primary was cancelled, as no candidates filed to run.

==== General election ====
Illinois Appellate Court 1st district (4th division) election
| Party | Candidate | Votes | % |
|---|---|---|---|
| Democratic | Eileen O'Neill Burke (incumbent) | 1,038,128 | 100 |
| Total votes | | 1,038,128 | 100 |

=== 1st district (5th division) ===
Incumbent Bertina E. Lampkin, who was appointed on February 3, 2014 to fill the vacancy left after the death in office of Patrick Quinn, won reelection, running unopposed in both the Democratic primary and general election. This was a regular election, as Appeton's term would have ended in 2016.

==== Democratic primary ====
Illinois Appellate Court 1st district (5th division) Democratic primary
| Party | Candidate | Votes | % |
|---|---|---|---|
| Democratic | Bertina E. Lampkin (incumbent) | 792,641 | 100 |
| Total votes | | 792,641 | 100 |

==== Republican primary ====
The Republican primary was cancelled, as no candidates filed to run.

==== General election ====
Illinois Appellate Court 1st district (5th division) election
| Party | Candidate | Votes | % |
|---|---|---|---|
| Democratic | Bertina E. Lampkin (incumbent) | 1,507,691 | 100 |
| Total votes | | 1,507,691 | 100 |

=== 5th district (Stewart vacancy) ===
A vacancy was created by the retirement of Bruce Stewart. Republican John B. Barberis Jr. was elected to fill the seat. This was a regular election, as Stewart's term ended in 2016.

==== Democratic primary ====
Illinois Appellate Court 5th district (Stewart vacancy) Democratic primary
| Party | Candidate | Votes | % |
|---|---|---|---|
| Democratic | Brad K. Bleyer | 106,079 | 100 |
| Total votes | | 106,079 | 100 |

==== Republican primary ====
Illinois Appellate Court 5th district (Stewart vacancy) Republican primary
| Party | Candidate | Votes | % |
|---|---|---|---|
| Republican | John B. Barberis, Jr. | 139,650 | 100 |
| Total votes | | 139,650 | 100 |

==== General election ====
Illinois Appellate Court 5th district (Stewart vacancy) election
| Party | Candidate | Votes | % |
|---|---|---|---|
| Republican | John B. Barberis, Jr. | 317,117 | 55.86 |
| Democratic | Brad K. Bleyer | 250,544 | 44.14 |
| Total votes | | 567,661 | 100 |

=== 5th district (Wexstten vacancy) ===
A vacancy was created by the January 29, 2014 retirement of James M. Wexstten. Republican James R. Moore was elected to fill the seat. This was a regular election, as Wexstten's term would have ended in 2016.

==== Democratic primary ====
Illinois Appellate Court 5th district (Wexstten vacancy) Democratic primary
| Party | Candidate | Votes | % |
|---|---|---|---|
| Democratic | Jo Beth Weber | 108,055 | 100 |
| Total votes | | 108,055 | 100 |

==== Republican primary ====
Illinois Appellate Court 5th district (Wexstten vacancy) Republican primary
| Party | Candidate | Votes | % |
|---|---|---|---|
| Republican | James R. Randy Moore | 142,599 | 100 |
| Total votes | | 142,599 | 100 |

==== General election ====
Illinois Appellate Court 5th district (Wexstten vacancy) election
| Party | Candidate | Votes | % |
|---|---|---|---|
| Republican | James R. Randy Moore | 307,926 | 53.84 |
| Democratic | Joe Beth Weber | 264,041 | 46.16 |
| Total votes | | 571,967 | 100 |

=== Retention elections ===
| District | Incumbent | | | | Vote | | Cite |
| District | Party | Name | In office since | Previous years elected/retained | Yes (Retain) | No (Remove) | Cite |
|---|---|---|---|---|---|---|---|
| 1st | Democratic | Joy Cunningham | December 4, 2006 | 2006 (elected) | 1,161,051 (78.8%) | 311,541 (21.2%) | |
| 3rd | Democratic | Vicki R. Wright | December 4, 2006 | 2006 (elected) | 558,811 (79.9%) | 140,347 (20.1) | / |
| 4th | Republican | James A. Knecht | December 1, 1986 | 1986 (elected), 1996, 2006 (retained) | 403,223 (81.5%) | 91,322 (18.47) | |

== Lower courts ==
Lower courts also saw judicial elections.
