= Eileen O'Neill Burke =

American lawyer, politician and judge (born 1965)

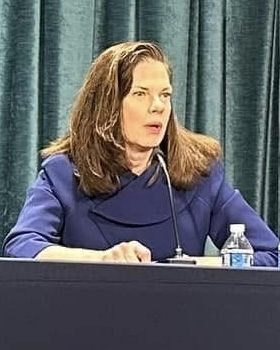
- Burke in 2025

Cook County State's Attorney
- Incumbent
- Assumed office December 2, 2024
- Preceded by: Kim Foxx

Personal details
- Born: 1965 (age 60–61) Chicago, Illinois, U.S.
- Party: Democratic
- Children: 4
- Education: University of Illinois, Urbana-Champaign (BA); Illinois Institute of Technology (JD)

Eileen O'Neill Burke (born 1965) is an American lawyer, politician, and former judge serving as the Cook County State's Attorney since her election in 2024. She was previously a justice on the Illinois First District Appellate Court and a judge on the Circuit Court of Cook County. Before that, she worked for a decade as a prosecutor and a criminal defense lawyer.

== Early life and education ==
O'Neill Burke was born and raised in Northwest Side, Chicago. She earned her undergraduate degree from the University of Illinois Urbana-Champaign and a Juris Doctor degree from Illinois Institute of Technology Chicago-Kent College of Law.

== Career ==
O'Neill Burke began her legal career as an assistant state’s attorney for Cook County, Illinois, a position she held for ten years, where she prosecuted criminal cases. Following her time as a prosecutor, she worked as a criminal defense lawyer, representing juveniles and adults in the legal system.

In 2008, O'Neill Burke was elected to the Circuit Court of Cook County, where she presided over both criminal and civil cases for eight years. She also taught civil procedure to new judges in Illinois, beginning in 2012. During the 2016 Illinois judicial elections, she was elected to the Illinois First District Appellate Court, where she reviewed more than 1,800 trial court decisions and issued over 800 written opinions. During her tenure, she served as faculty for judicial education programs, training both trial and appellate judges.

From 2022 to mid-2023, O'Neill Burke served as 51st president of the Illinois Judges Association, leading educational and community outreach initiatives.

During the 2024 Cook County, Illinois, elections, O'Neill Burke was elected Cook County State's Attorney. She narrowly defeated Clayton Harris III in the Democratic primary by fewer than 1,600 votes and won the general election with approximately 67 percent of the vote against Republican candidate Bob Fioretti. On December 2, 2024, she succeeded Kim Foxx, who chose not to run for reelection.

As State’s Attorney, O'Neill Burke stated her intention to implement stricter policies for prosecuting gun crimes and offenses involving specific firearm enhancements. She also emphasized support for restorative justice programs for non-violent offenders while addressing challenges such as wrongful convictions and strained relations between law enforcement and her office.

== Personal life ==
O'Neill Burke is married to lawyer John "JD" Burke. They have four adult children.

== Electoral history ==
2016 Illinois Appellate Court 1st district (4th division) general election
Party	Candidate	Votes	%
Democratic	Eileen O'Neill Burke (incumbent)	1,038,128	100
Total votes		1,038,128	100
