= Celina Villanueva =

American politician

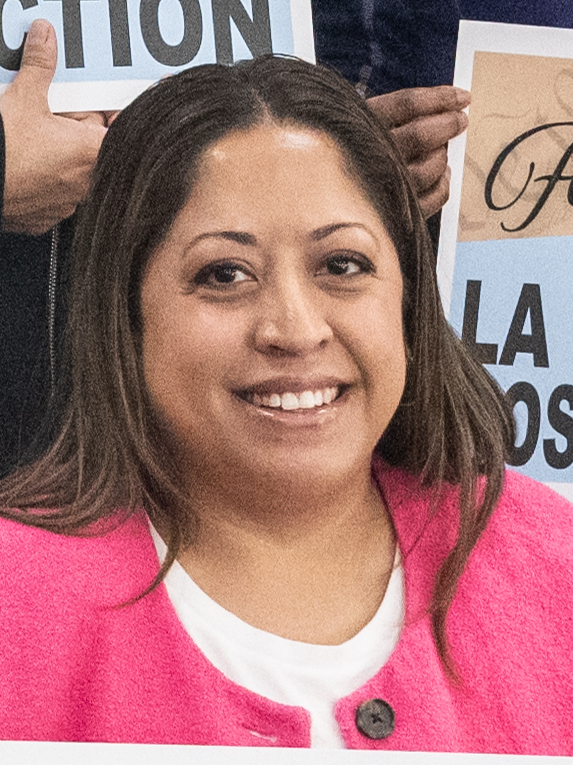
- Villanueva in 2025

Member of the Illinois Senate
- Incumbent
- Assumed office January 7, 2020
- Preceded by: Martin Sandoval
- Constituency: 11th district (2020–2023); 12th district (2023–present)

Member of the Illinois House of Representatives from the 21st district
- In office July 24, 2018 – January 7, 2020
- Preceded by: Silvana Tabares
- Succeeded by: Edgar González Jr.

Personal details
- Born: Chicago, Illinois, U.S.
- Party: Democratic
- Education: University of Illinois, Urbana-Champaign (BA)

Celina Villanueva is a Democratic member of the Illinois Senate representing the 12th district. She previously served in the Illinois House of Representatives for the 21st district from her appointment in July 2018 to her appointment to the Illinois Senate on January 7, 2020.

== Early life and career ==
Villanueva worked as a youth engagement manager at the Illinois Coalition for Immigrant and Refugee Rights. She is an alumna of the University of Illinois at Urbana–Champaign where she earned a B.A in Latina/Latino Studies with minors in African-American Studies and Spanish. She was a speaker at the 2018 Women's March in Chicago. She is considered a political ally of Cook County Commissioner Chuy García for whom she worked as an outreach director.

Villanueva was appointed to the Illinois House of Representatives on July 24, 2018, to replace Silvana Tabares, who in turn had been appointed to fill a vacancy as alderman of Chicago's 23rd Ward. The appointment was conducted by a panel of local Democratic leaders chaired by Senator Steven Landek, the Committeeman from Lyons Township. Villanueva was one of five candidates, who included: Carlos Aparicio, Chief of Staff for Cook County Commissioner Jeff Tobolski; John Chojnacki, law enforcement instructor at Calumet College of St. Joseph; Sergio Rodriguez, Mayor of Summit; and Myra Ortiz, Village Trustee in Summit.

== Political career ==
Villanueva was sworn into the Illinois House of Representatives on July 24, 2018, immediately after her appointment to fill a vacancy. That vacancy arose when sitting Rep. Silvana Tabares was appointed to fill a Chicago City Council vacancy caused by the resignation of Ald. Michael Zalewski. Villanueva won re-election unopposed in the November 2018 election.

During her first term, Villanueva was a leader in pushing for a bill that limit how much public agencies in Illinois could cooperate with U.S. Immigration and Customs Enforcement.

In November 2019, Villaneuva launched a campaign to replace resigning Illinois State Senator Martin Sandoval. On January 7, 2020, Villaneuva was appointed to become state senator of the 11th district, after Sandoval's resignation amid a corruption probe.

As of July 2022, Senator Villanueva was a member of the following Illinois Senate committees:

- Appropriations - Higher Education Committee (SAPP-SAHE)
- Appropriations - Human Services Committee (SAPP-SAHS)
- Higher Education Committee (SCHE)
- (Chairwoman of) Human Rights Committee (SHUM)
- Labor Committee (SLAB)
- (Co-chairwoman of) Labor - Special Issues Committee (SLAB-SLSI)
- Public Safety Committee (SPUB)
- Redistricting - Chicago South Committee (SRED-SRCS)
- Transportation Committee (STRN)

== Personal life ==
Villanueva is a resident of Little Village.

== Electoral history ==
Illinois 21st State House District General Election, 2018
Party	Candidate	Votes	%
Democratic	Celina Villanueva (incumbent)	15,344	100.0
Total votes		15,344	100.0
