= Robert S. Molaro =

American politician (1950–2020)

Robert Molaro

Member of the Illinois House of Representatives from the 21st district
- In office January 14, 2003 - January 14, 2009
- Succeeded by: Michael J. Zalewski

Personal details
- Born: June 29, 1950 Chicago, Illinois, U.S.
- Died: June 15, 2020 (aged 69)
- Party: Democratic
- Spouse: Barbara
- Profession: Attorney

Robert S. Molaro (June 29, 1950 – June 15, 2020) was an American politician. He served as a Democratic member of both houses of the Illinois General Assembly.

== Biography ==
He graduated from Loyola University with a B.S. in business administration and received his J.D. from John Marshall Law School. He served as a delegate to the 1988 Democratic National Convention. In 1984, he was elected the Democratic Committeeman for Chicago's 12th ward. In 1993, he was elected to the Illinois Senate. He was later elected to the Illinois House of Representatives. Upon his retirement from the state legislature on December 4, 2008, Molaro was eligible for a public pension of about $64,000 annually based on the formula for Illinois lawmakers of 85% of their last salary. Chicago Alderman Edward M. Burke hired Molaro as an expert on pensions to write a 19-page white paper on Chicago's pension funds. Molaro worked as an aide to Burke for one month, earned $12,000, and nearly doubled his pension. On June 15, 2020, Molaro died of pancreatic cancer.

== Electoral history ==
2002: (D) Robert S. Molaro: 61% (R) Randy Kantner: 39%

2004: (D) Robert S. Molaro: 59% (R) Martin J. Ryan: 41%

2006: (D) Robert S. Molaro: 70% (R) Charles Johnson: 30%

2008: Did not seek re-election
