= Martin Sandoval =

American politician (1964–2020)

Martin A. Sandoval

Member of the Illinois Senate from the 11th district
- In office January 9, 2013 – January 1, 2020
- Preceded by: Steven Landek
- Succeeded by: Celina Villanueva

Member of the Illinois Senate from the 12th district
- In office January 8, 2003 – January 9, 2013
- Preceded by: Robert Molaro
- Succeeded by: Steven Landek

Personal details
- Born: January 12, 1964 Chicago, Illinois, U.S.
- Died: December 5, 2020 (aged 56) Maywood, Illinois, U.S.
- Cause of death: COVID-19
- Party: Democratic
- Spouse: Marina Sandoval

Martin A. Sandoval (January 12, 1964 – December 5, 2020) was an American Democratic politician and senator for Illinois who admitted guilt to corruption charges in 2020. He sat in the Illinois Senate from 2003 to 2020.

== Early life ==
Sandoval was born January 12, 1964, in the Back of the Yards, a neighborhood on Chicago's Southwest Side. He graduated from Archbishop Quigley Preparatory Seminary South High School and went on to Loyola University, Chicago, where he received a bachelor's degree in psychology.

== Political career ==
By 2002, Sandoval was a commissioner of the Metropolitan Water Reclamation District of Greater Chicago; he ran for election to commissioner and to state senator at the same time.

=== Illinois Senate ===
Sandoval was elected in 2002 as state senator and was then sworn into office in 2003.

Sandoval questioned the work ethic of Governor Rod Blagojevich during the 2007 budget crisis, as Blagojevich returned to Chicago rather than staying in Springfield for the remainder of the session.

Sandoval was part of the Illinois Senate leadership. As of 2019, Sandoval was the chair of the Senate Transportation Committee and of the Special Committee on Supplier Diversity; Sub-Chairperson of the Subcommittee on Capital; and a member of the Energy and Public Utilities, Higher Education, and Licensed Activities committees and the Special Committee on Pension Investments.

After a Sandoval fundraiser held on August 16, 2019, at the Klein Creek Golf Club in DuPage County for donors who paid a minimum of $250 to attend. Photos from the event were posted on Facebook the next day showing a mock assassination of President Donald Trump. In the photo, a man wearing the Trump mask appears to grab his chest and lean back as if being shot by a man holding an ersatz assault rifle. Also posted were separate images of Sandoval standing with the man who held the gun in the contentious photo. The pictures sparked outrage online and condemnation from Illinois Governor J. B. Pritzker; Sandoval released a statement apologizing for the "unacceptable" actions of the guests at his event.

In May 2019, Sandoval introduced legislation that proposed to increase the annual registration fee for electric vehicles from $17.50 to $1,000.00, which would have raised about $2.4 billion in annual funding.

=== Corruption ===
On September 24, 2019, Sandoval's offices in the Illinois State Capitol building and his regional office in both Springfield and Cicero were raided by federal agents from the FBI and IRS. The same day two officials were seen exiting Sandoval's house to get hand trucks to take inside. Sandoval at first refused to comment on the situation. Federal agents involved in the raid were seeking a vast array of information involving construction, transportation and power company officials, lobbyists, gambling interests, a red-light camera company, and at least three suburban mayors. Agents also came to both his Cicero office and home. The initial Sandoval raid was quickly followed by federal law enforcement actions in McCook, Lyons, and Summit — all towns in the senator's district.

On November 28, 2019, in the wake of the ongoing probe, Sandoval announced he would resign from the Illinois State Senate effective January 1, 2020 and he had already resigned as chair of the State Senate's Transportation Committee in advance of his complete departure from the legislative body.

On January 28, 2020, Sandoval agreed to plead guilty to federal charges of bribery and filing a false tax return, both of which he had been charged with earlier in the week. He confirmed that he had taken more than $250,000 in bribes, dating back to at least 2016.

At the heart of the investigation was approximately $70,000 in government-supplied cash Sandoval took from a representative of red-light camera company SafeSpeed, LLC. This company was working with authorities. Sandoval agreed to act as the company's "protector" in the state senate in exchange for this cash. SafeSpeed received a portion of the money collected from traffic tickets, and Sandoval began receiving a monthly bribe after complaining that he was not receiving kickbacks on SafeSpeed's ticket revenue. He also agreed that he had accepted bribery from other people in exchange for using his Senate position, involving at least 5 other participants and with Sandoval directing at least 2 other people. Sandoval also agreed that he had falsified federal and Illinois tax returns, including claiming 2017 income of $125,905 when his income was at least $259,255, and also underreporting his income for 2012 through 2016.

As part of his plea agreement, Sandoval agreed to cooperate with federal investigations. At his plea hearing, he was released on $10,000 bond and banned from leaving the state, and was scheduled for sentencing in July. However, Sandoval would instead continue to cooperate with prosecutors, who recommended a light sentence for him. It was also noted at the time of his death in December 2020 that ComEd even admitted to a bribery scheme connected to attempts to influence Illinois Speaker of the House Mike Madigan just months after Sandoval's guilty plea, with Madigan confidant Michael McClain, former ComEd CEO Anne Pramaggiore, former ComEd executive and lobbyist John Hooker, and former lobbyist Jay Doherty all eventually being given bribery charges in November 2020. Despite this, it was never made clear if Sandavol's cooperation had contributed to this ComEd crackdown, with Sandoval never being criminally charged for anything connected to ComEd. However, it was also noted that in November 2020, the same month the four ComEd figures were criminally charged, that prosecutors had stated in a court filing that they intended to make use of Sandoval's cooperation for "at least several more months," stating that Sandoval "has been fully compliant with the conditions of his release and has provided valuable cooperation that is expected to last at least several more months."

== Personal life and death ==
Sandoval and his wife Marina had three children. He died from COVID-19 at Loyola University Medical Center on December 5, 2020, at the age of 56, during the COVID-19 pandemic in Illinois.
