= Calumet/Giles Prairie District =

Historic district of Chicago, Illinois, US

Coordinates: 41.8338°N 87.6194°W

The Calumet/Giles Prairie District is a historic district in the South Side, Chicago community area of Chicago, Illinois, United States. The district was built between 1870 and 1910 by various architects. It was designated a Chicago Landmark on July 13, 1988.

== Architecture and development ==
The district is one of the few surviving concentrations of late nineteenth- and early twentieth-century rowhouses on Chicago’s South Side. Its houses reflect the growth of the surrounding Douglas community during the 1880s and 1890s, when the area attracted successful merchants and professionals.
