= Bill Conway (politician) =

American politician

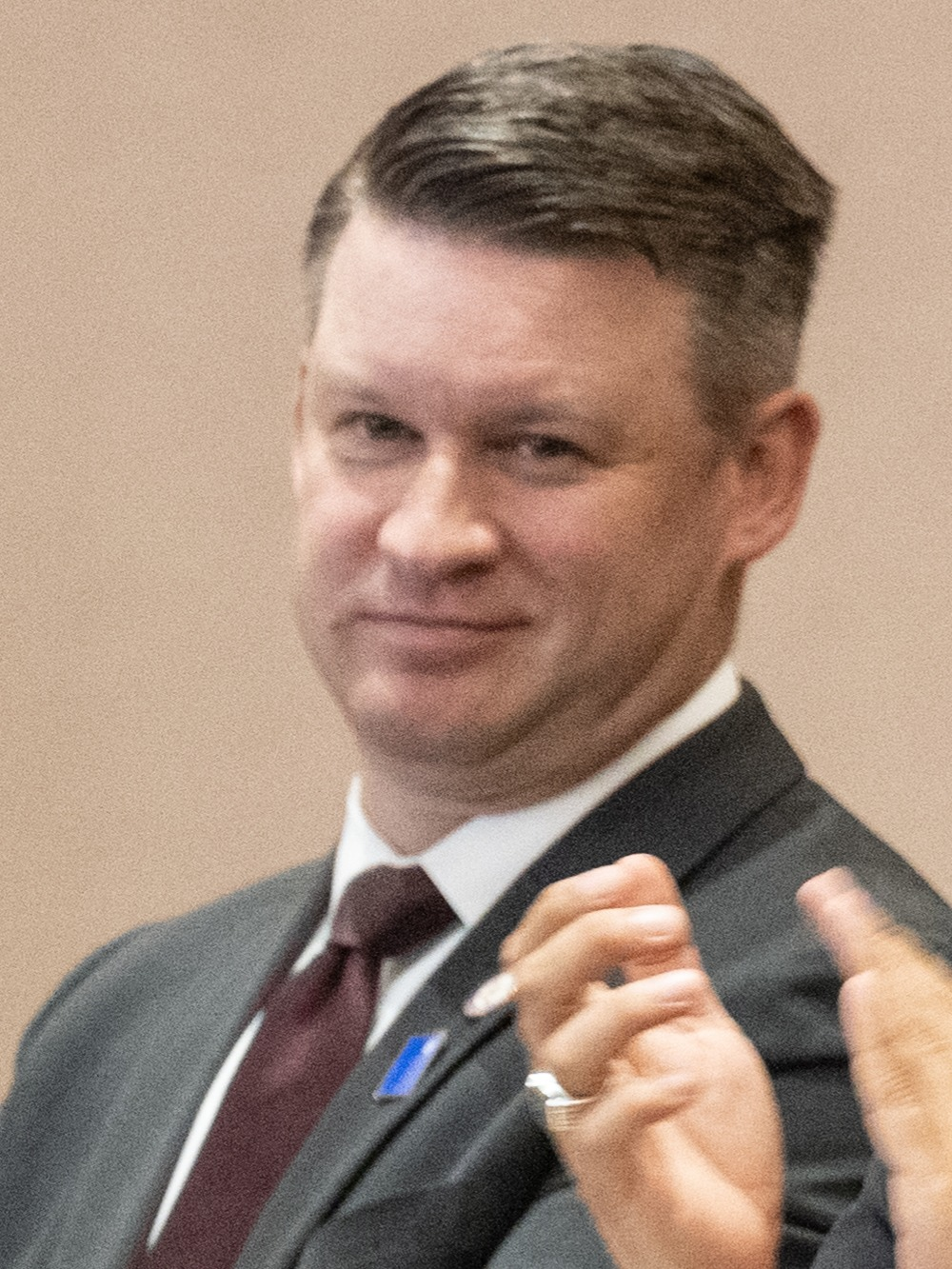
- Conway in 2023

Member of the Chicago City Council from the 34th ward
- Incumbent
- Assumed office May 15, 2023
- Preceded by: Carrie Austin

Personal details
- Born: William Elias Conway III; May 8, 1978 (age 48) Chicago, Illinois, U.S
- Party: Democratic
- Relatives: William E. Conway Jr. (father)
- Education: University of Pennsylvania (BS); Georgetown University (JD); University of Chicago (MBA)

Military service
- Branch/service: United States Navy

William Elias "Bill" Conway III (born May 8, 1978) is an American politician, attorney, businessman, and military veteran. He is the alderman for the 34th ward in the Chicago City Council, having won the 2023 election for the office. He also serves as the Democratic committeeperson for the 34th ward.

Conway previously served as an assistant state's attorney for Cook County, Illinois and currently serves as adjunct professor at DePaul University. He unsuccessfully ran for the Democratic Party's primary for Cook County state’s attorney in 2020.

== Early life and education ==
William Conway was born and raised in Chicago, Illinois, the son of Joanne Boosalis Conway and William E. Conway Jr., an American billionaire businessman and philanthropist. He attended the Latin School of Chicago, a private school in the Gold Coast neighborhood on the Near North Side. Conway entered The Wharton School, where he earned a bachelor's degree in Accounting in 2000. He received a Juris Doctor degree from Georgetown University Law Center in 2006. Conway then graduated from the University of Chicago with an MBA degree in 2013.

== Early career ==
From 2006 to 2012, Conway served as Assistant State's Attorney for Cook County State's Attorney's Officer under Richard A. Devine and Anita Alvarez, working on embezzlement cases in the public corruption office. The DePaulia notes that during his tenure "Conway prosecuted high level corruption and financial crime cases, including the police officers who embezzled one million dollars from the Chicago Sergeants Union in 2012."

Conway joined the United States Navy Reserve in May 2012 and in August 2017 began a seven-month tour at Al Udeid Air Base in Qatar, leading an intelligence team that tracked Taliban and Islamic State threats in Afghanistan. During his military career, he received an Air Force Commendation Medal, the National Defense Service Medal and the Global War on Terrorism Expeditionary Medal. Conway continues to serve in the U.S. Navy at the rank of Lieutenant Commander.

In July 2013, he joined the Investment Banking/ Diversified Industries Division of J.P. Morgan in Chicago as an investment banker. Conway left the company in 2016.

Since 2016, Conway has been serving as adjunct professor at the Department of Finance & Real Estate of DePaul University, teaching various courses on Finance and Real Estate. He also works as a venture partner and manager on several investments funds including Hyde Park Angels, Boos Brothers Investments, Luxe Bloom, LLC., Raputs, LLC. and Green Street Renewables, LLC.

== Political career ==
=== 2020 election for Cook County State's Attorney ===
In 2020, Conway ran for the Cook County State's Attorney office in Illinois, where he took 2nd place with 31% of the vote in the Democratic primary but lost to the incumbent Kim Foxx (50.19% of the vote) on March 17, 2020. Kim Foxx ultimately won the general election by defeating Republican Pat O'Brien. Conway's father contributed $500,000 to the campaign the day after his son declared his candidacy and $10.5 million in total; a week before the primary, Conway had raised $11.4 million, of which $10.5 million came from his father. Three executives of the Carlyle Group were also among his largest donors: the firm's managing director Allan Holt gave $200,000, making him the campaign's second-largest contributor, senior adviser Gregory S. Ledford gave $50,000 and board member Peter Clare gave $30,000. According to The Chicago Reporter, "the Cook County state’s attorney’s race has already become the most expensive in Cook County history, with candidates raising almost $16 million combined, which is more than double that of the 2016 primary."

Conway's opponents used the source of the money to portray him as, in the Chicago Tribune's summary, "a fake progressive whose father is trying to buy him a powerful office", pointing to the Carlyle Group's holdings in military contractors. The Tribune reported that Carlyle had also owned the for-profit nursing home chain HCR ManorCare for a decade, during which the chain accumulated allegations that it had neglected elderly patients and committed Medicare fraud before entering bankruptcy in 2018. Asked about ManorCare, Conway said it was "not something that I'm particularly familiar with" and added, "We all have relatives that we don't agree with, but I'm certainly not going to sit here and disown my own father." He said he had never worked for the Carlyle Group but that he managed some of his father's fortune, declining to say how much. Foxx said at a candidate forum that Conway had spent the campaign "introducing himself to the public in a duplicitous way", and one of her campaign's web advertisements said that "the Conway family made billions off global conflict." Conway argued that his father's money made him independent, saying, "When I'm elected, I'm not going to owe anybody anything."

South Side Weekly reported that in an interview with WLS radio Conway had described a modest upbringing by his "single" mother, although his parents remained married and jointly funded his education at the Latin School of Chicago.

In November 2019, a Conway campaign advertisement stated, "When I was in Afghanistan, I experienced the trauma of being fired upon." Asked about the claim, Conway described the incident as indirect enemy fire at Bagram Airfield, saying that a rocket alarm had sounded while he was walking to get coffee and that he had run to a bunker about 50 yards away. He said indirect fire was common at Bagram and that no decoration is awarded for it. Foxx's campaign called the matter a "troubling allegation" and said that "exaggerating one's military record is a sign of someone who puts politics above all else", while Conway's spokesman described that response as a "desperate, swiftboat style attempt to smear Bill's record".

=== 2023 election for Chicago City Council ===
In 2023, Conway was elected as an alderman on the Chicago City Council. During his election campaign, Conway addressed the crime situation in Chicago and pledged to allocate additional funds for security, suggesting an increase in the number of police officers and equipment to address crime in the city. Conway won the election with approximately 2/3 of the vote. Candidate Jim Ascot, who conceded the race, received about 33% of the votes.

== Personal life ==
He is married to Brittany Conway. They have a daughter, Bella.

== See also ==
- List of Chicago alderpersons since 1923
