= Kim Foxx =

American politician (born 1972)

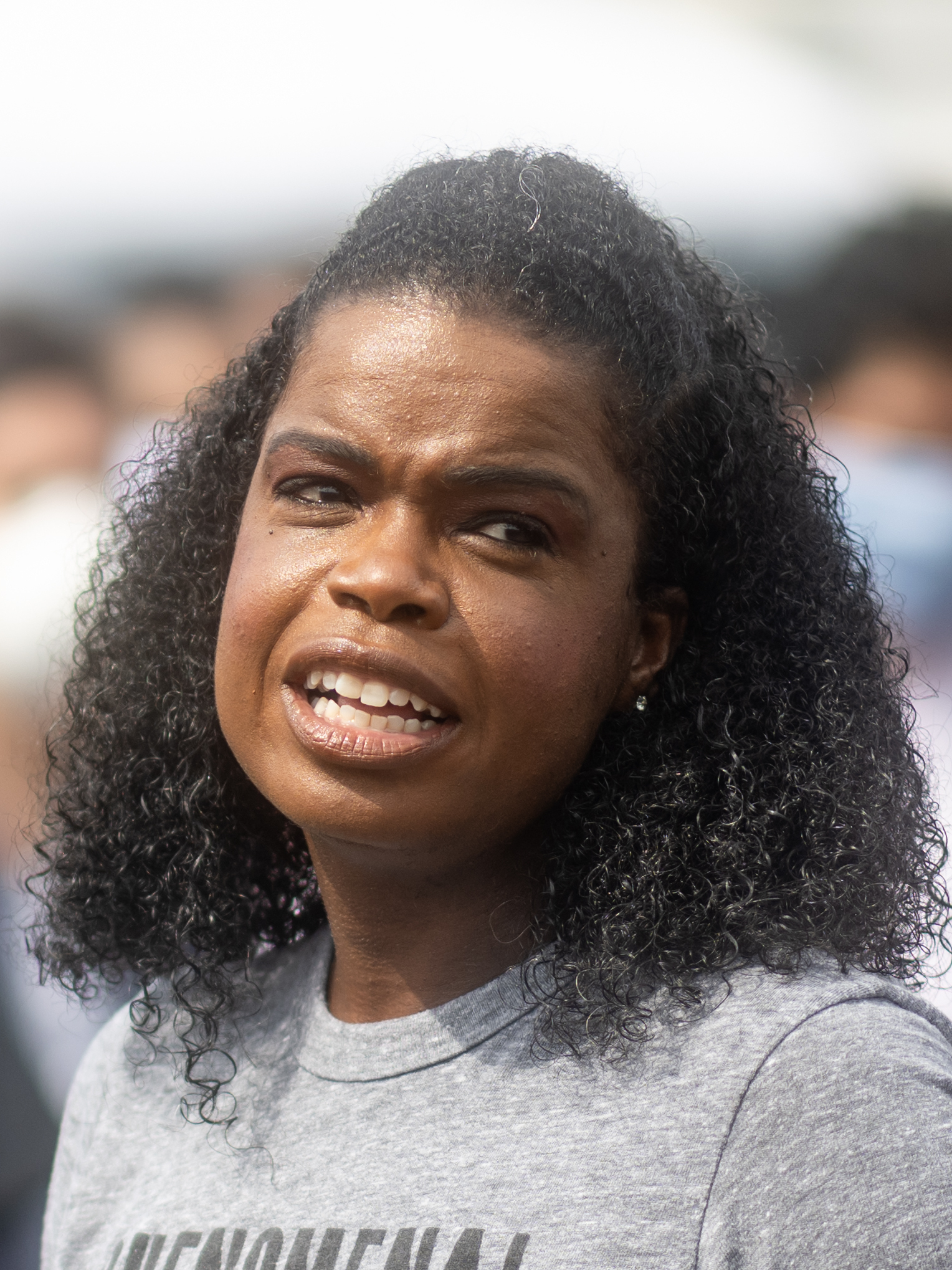
- Foxx in 2020

Cook County State's Attorney
- In office December 1, 2016 – December 1, 2024
- Preceded by: Anita Alvarez
- Succeeded by: Eileen O'Neill Burke

Personal details
- Born: April 9, 1972 (age 54) Chicago, Illinois, U.S.
- Party: Democratic
- Spouse: Kelley Foxx (m. 2001)
- Children: 4
- Education: Southern Illinois University, Carbondale (BA, JD)

Kimberly M. Foxx (née Anderson; born April 9, 1972) is an American politician who served as State's Attorney (district attorney) for Cook County, Illinois from 2016 to 2024. She managed the second largest prosecutor's office in the United States, consisting of approximately 700 attorneys and 1,100 employees. In 2016, she won the Democratic nomination for State's Attorney against incumbent Anita Alvarez and went on to win the general election. She was re-elected in 2020. In 2023, she announced that she would not run for re-election in 2024.

Foxx ran for the State's Attorney's office on a platform of criminal justice reform, and has often been termed a "reformist", "reform-minded", or "progressive" prosecutor alongside others such as Larry Krasner, Rachael Rollins, Chesa Boudin, Aramis Ayala, Kimberly Gardner, Diana Becton, and Satana Deberry. She is the second African American, after Cecil A. Partee, to hold this position.

== Early life and education ==
Foxx was born in Chicago and grew up in the Cabrini-Green Housing Project on the Near North Side. Raised by her mother and grandmother, Foxx graduated from LaSalle Language Academy in Old Town and from Lincoln Park High School in 1990. She earned a bachelor's degree in political science from Southern Illinois University, and a J.D. degree from Southern Illinois University School of Law. She is a member of the board of trustees of Adler University.

== Early career in law and government ==
After graduating from law school, Foxx worked as an assistant public guardian in the Cook County Public Guardian's Office for three years. She then worked as Assistant State's Attorney in Cook County for 12 years, joining during Richard A. Devine's tenure as State's Attorney. In this role, she worked on cases of child protection and juvenile offenders. In 2013, she was hired as deputy chief of staff for Cook County Board President Toni Preckwinkle, focusing on criminal justice issues. She was later promoted to chief of staff for Preckwinkle, and served in that role until 2016. Foxx has been described as a protege of Preckwinkle.

== Elections for Cook County State's Attorney ==
=== 2016 election ===
In September 2015, Foxx announced that she would challenge incumbent Anita Alvarez in the 2016 election for Cook County State's Attorney. She also faced a second challenger, former federal and state prosecutor Donna More. Foxx campaigned on a platform of criminal justice reform, emphasizing policies such as diverting low-level offenders to treatment programs rather than prisons, address wrongful convictions, and dealing more aggressively with police misconduct.

During the campaign, Alvarez came under scrutiny for her handling of the murder of Laquan McDonald by Chicago police officers. Foxx criticized Alvarez for her performance on the issues of police accountability and wrongful convictions.

On January 14, 2016, the Cook County Democratic Party endorsed Foxx for state's attorney, reversing its decision made in August 2015 to not endorse any candidate. She won the Democratic primary for state's attorney's race on March 15, 2016, with 58% of the vote, and went on to win the November general election with 72% of the vote.

=== 2020 election ===
Foxx announced on November 19, 2019, that she would run for re-election. She faced three competitors in the Democratic Party primary: Bill Conway, Bob Fioretti, and Donna More. Ahead of the primary, Foxx had been endorsed by several progressive organizations, labor unions, and state-wide elected officials. Her campaign's largest donors were Michael Sacks, Fred Eychaner, SEIU, Chicago Federation of Labor, and EMILY's List; a Super-PAC supporting her campaign also received a $2 million donation from George Soros. She won the primary election on March 17, 2020, with 50.19% of the vote. Relative to the 2016 election, she maintained a high level of support in the county's majority-African American neighborhoods and lost some support in white neighborhoods (especially in Chicago's northwest side and in suburban Cook County). In the November 3, 2020 general election, she defeated Republican candidate Pat O'Brien with 54.1% of the vote and was re-elected to a four-year term.

== Cook County State's Attorney (2016–2024) ==
=== Bail and pretrial detention reforms ===
In March 2017, shortly after taking office, Foxx announced that the State's Attorney's office would no longer pursue keeping certain detainees in jail because they are unable to post the bail amount of $1000. Foxx expressed support for the proposed Bail Reform Act, testifying in favor of it at the Illinois General Assembly despite opposition to the bill from the Illinois State's Attorneys' Association. The legislation passed in June 2017 and removed the requirement to post cash bail for those charged with minor crimes. That same month, Foxx's office announced that prosecutors would no longer request pretrial detention for those charged with low-level nonviolent offenses in court.

=== Transparency reforms ===
In March 2018, Foxx's office launched an open data portal and released 6 years of data on felony criminal cases. Since then, case-level data on felony intake, initiation, disposition, and sentencing, along with summary reports and dashboards, have been posted on the State's Attorney office's website.

=== Reduction in incarceration rates ===
A series of reports by The People's Lobby and Reclaim Chicago, progressive organizations who had endorsed Foxx in 2016, found that the number of sentences involving prison time in Cook County dropped 2.5% from 2016 to 2017 and 19% from 2017 to 2018.

An October 2019 report by The Marshall Project found that since taking office, Foxx "turned away more than 5,000 cases that would have been pursued by previous State's Attorney Anita Alvarez, mostly by declining to prosecute low-level shoplifting and drug offenses and by diverting more cases to alternative treatment programs." Foxx has directed her office to not prosecute shoplifting cases under $1,000 as felonies.

=== Gun violence ===
Early in her first term, Foxx established a program called the Gun Crimes Strategies Unit (GCSU), which placed specially trained prosecutors directly in police districts. In 2019, analysis by the University of Chicago Crime Lab found that charges for habitual gun offenders increased in the five districts with the GCSU program.

=== Police misconduct ===
In April 2017, Foxx announced that her office had drafted legislation proposing an amendment to the Special Prosecutor Act, which would give the statewide Office of the State Appellate Prosecutor the jurisdiction to review cases of police shootings where the State's Attorney's office decides not to prosecute. The legislation was passed in May 2017 and signed into law in August 2017.

=== Marijuana legalization and conviction expungements ===
In January 2019, Foxx announced her support for the proposed legalization of recreational marijuana use in Illinois, and helped to write the provisions of the law pertaining to past convictions. The law passed in May 2019, and later that year, Foxx's office initiated the expungement of 1,012 low-level nonviolent marijuana convictions as allowed by the new law. Foxx's office stated that it would attempt to use the maximum authority allowed by the law to overturn low-level convictions, and partnered with the nonprofit organization Code for America to develop procedures for the conviction relief process. Foxx has called conviction relief an effort to "right the wrongs of the past" and "a recommitment of our values; that a low-level marijuana conviction does not mean that someone is a threat to public safety." By 2022, the effort had led to the expungement of 15,000 marijuana convictions.

=== Wrongful convictions ===
In October 2019, as part of her budget proposal to the Cook County Board of Commissioners, Foxx proposed expanding the Conviction Integrity Unit in the State's Attorney's office by adding 10 new units. The proposed expansion was partly in response to developments that would enable the State's Attorney's office to address conviction challenges based on allegations of torture by former Chicago police commander Jon Burge.

As of February 2020, the Conviction Integrity Unit has worked with the Exoneration Project to overturn 95 convictions tied to the team of disgraced former Chicago police sergeant Ronald Watts.

=== George Floyd protests and coinciding unrest ===
In 2020, during the George Floyd protests, Foxx issued a department-wide policy to decriminalize protesting, instructing prosecutors to distinguish peaceful protestors from "individuals who intentionally cause harm or damage." The policy adopted a "presumption of dismissal" for certain low-level charges (e.g. disorderly conduct, public demonstration, unlawful gathering, curfew violation) and a "presumption against proceeding unless body-worn camera footage is available and/or where a police officer is the complainant" for more serious charges (e.g. resisting or obstructing arrest, assault, battery, aggravated battery, mob action, obstructing identification) that arose during protests. Foxx's challenger in the 2020 election, Republican candidate Pat O'Brien, criticized this policy and argued that it allowed "crime and looting to intermix with peaceful protests."

=== Jussie Smollett case ===
On February 19, 2019, Foxx announced that she had recused herself from the Jussie Smollett hate crime investigation. Smollett orchestrated a staged assault and filed a false report with the local police; Foxx's recusal, due to her "familiarity with potential witnesses in the case", prompted criticism from her predecessor Anita Alvarez. Recusing herself would have required Foxx to ask the court to appoint an outside attorney as a special prosecutor. Critics called her method of recusal insufficient, saying that because her office retained authority over the case, she maintained influence over how it was handled.

On March 26, 2019, her office dropped all charges against Smollett, which was denounced by Mayor Rahm Emanuel and Police Superintendent Eddie T. Johnson. The Chicago Police Union pushed for an investigation into Foxx's decision. Foxx was also criticized by the Illinois Prosecutors Bar Association and the National District Attorneys Association. Chicago's Fraternal Order of Police called for her resignation. Smollett was convicted in December 2021 and was sentenced in March 2022 to 150 days in county jail, but the Illinois Supreme Court overturned the conviction in November 2024.

== Personal life ==
Kim Foxx has been married to Kelley Foxx since 2001. They have four daughters.

== Election results ==
Cook County State's Attorney, 2020 general election
Party	Candidate	Votes	%
Democratic	Kim Foxx (incumbent)	1,194,299	54.21
Republican	Patrick W. "Pat" O'Brien	861,108	39.08
Libertarian	Brian Dennehy	147,769	6.71
Total votes		2,203,176	100

Cook County State's Attorney, 2020 Democratic primary election
Party	Candidate	Votes	%
Democratic	Kim Foxx (incumbent)	447,974	50.19
Democratic	Bill Conway	276,341	30.96
Democratic	Donna More	122,528	13.73
Democratic	Bob Fioretti	44,794	5.02
Write-in	Others	955	0.11
Total votes		892,592	100

Cook County State's Attorney, 2016 general election
Party	Candidate	Votes	%
Democratic	Kim Foxx	1,459,087	72.06%
Republican	Christopher E.K. Pfannkuche	565,671	27.94%
Total votes		2,024,758	100.0%

Cook County State's Attorney, 2016 Democratic primary election
Party	Candidate	Votes	%
Democratic	Kim Foxx	645,738	58.3%
Democratic	Anita Alvarez (incumbent)	317,594	28.7%
Democratic	Donna More	144,063	13.8%
Total votes		1,107,395	100.0%
