= Edgar Gonzalez Jr. =

American politician (born 1996)

Edgar González
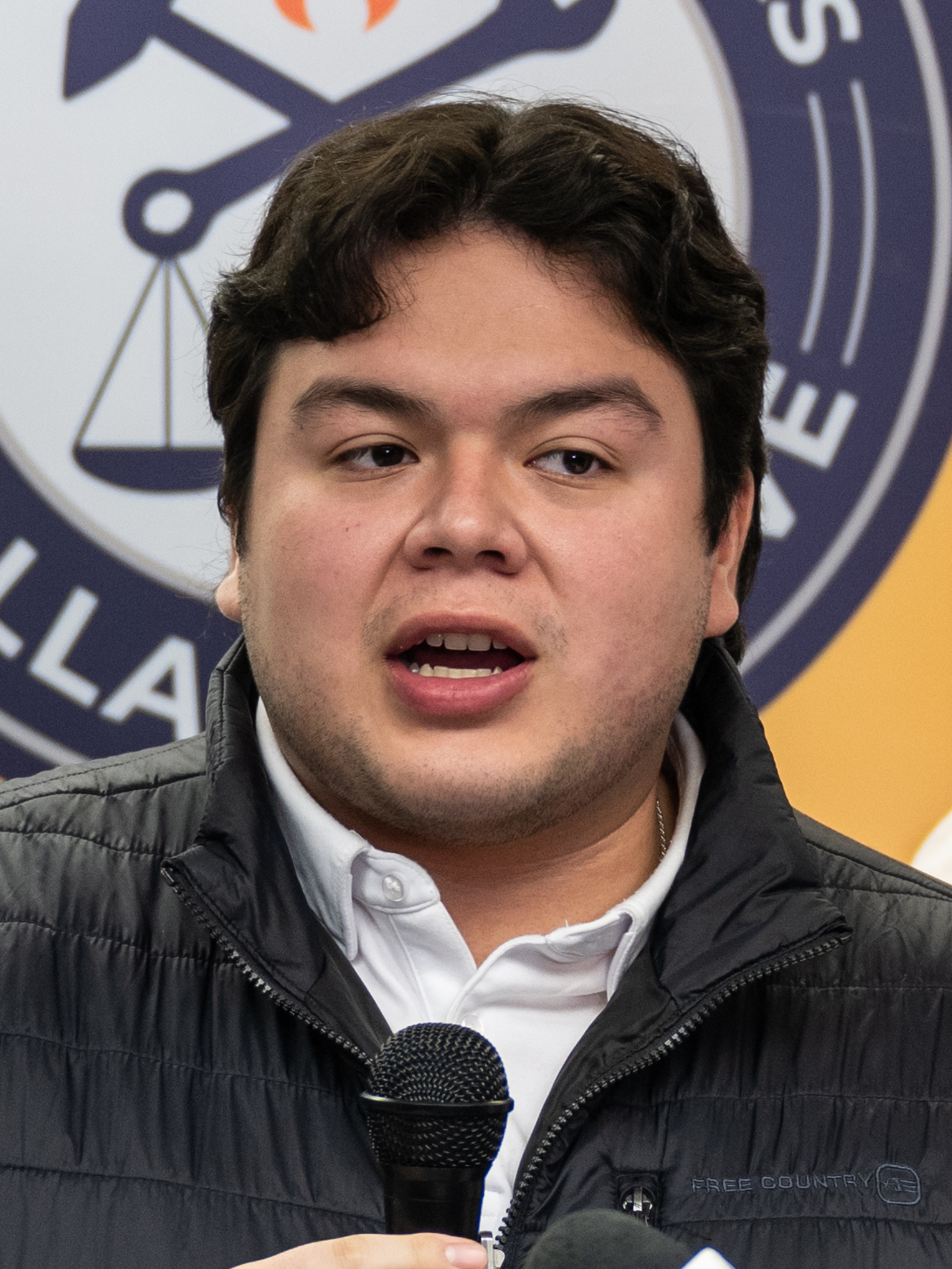
- González in 2025

Member of the Illinois House of Representatives
- Incumbent
- Assumed office January 10, 2020
- Preceded by: Celina Villanueva
- Constituency: 21st district (2020–2023); 23rd district (2023–present)

Personal details
- Born: December 25, 1996 (age 29) Chicago, Illinois, U.S.
- Party: Democratic
- Education: Harvard University (BA)

Edgar González Jr. is a Democratic member of the Illinois House of Representatives for the 23rd District. The 23rd District includes all or parts of the Chicago neighborhoods of South Lawndale, Brighton Park, and North Lawndale along with the nearby suburb of Cicero.

== Early life and education ==
Edgar Gonzalez Jr. was born and raised in the Little Village neighborhood of Chicago, Illinois, two blocks away from Cook County Jail. A son of working-class immigrants from Monterrey, Nuevo León, Mexico, his father is currently an IUOE Local 399 union member, his mother was formerly an SEIU Local 73 union member, and his sister is a current student at Columbia University.

He attended John Spry Elementary School for preschool and Maria Saucedo Scholastic Academy from kindergarten to sixth grade. He enrolled in Whitney M. Young Magnet High School's Academic Center and graduated in 2015. He went on to Harvard University, where he earned a bachelor's degree in government with a minor in economics in 2019, becoming the first in his family to graduate from college. During his time at Harvard, Gonzalez was a political cartoonist for The Harvard Crimson and a staff writer for the Harvard Political Review, as well as a tutor and translator for Harvard Student Agencies. He volunteered his time as a tutor for recent immigrant arrivals in English and subject tutoring at Chelsea High School and Malden High School, and launched a tutoring and mentoring program for at-risk Latinx youth in the Boston area with Roxbury nonprofit Sociedad Latina. On his breaks from school, he interned with Enlace Chicago his freshman summer, the MacArthur Foundation his sophomore summer, and with 22nd Ward Democratic Committeeman Michael Rodriguez (politician) his junior summer.

Upon graduation, Gonzalez began working as a constituency services liaison for Congressman Jesús "Chuy" García, specializing in casework and outreach ranging from immigration, social security, and veterans to criminal justice and education.

== Political career ==
Gonzalez was appointed to the Illinois House of Representatives on January 10, 2020, to replace Celina Villanueva, who in turn had been appointed to fill the vacancy of State Senator Martin Sandoval of Illinois's 11th State Senate District. The appointment was conducted by a panel of local Democratic leaders. At the time of his inauguration, Gonzalez was the youngest state representative in Illinois at 23 years of age. He is the youngest Latino state representative and the youngest Democratic state representative to be inaugurated in Illinois's history.

Gonzalez was the first member of the Illinois House of Representatives to publicly state he had tested positive for COVID-19 in May 2020.

=== Legislative Work ===
Gonzalez has championed increasing workplace safety standards, good-paying wages, and strengthening collective bargaining rights for workers in Illinois. In 2021, Gonzalez passed HB2521, which established that it is an unfair labor practice for an employer to threaten or retaliate against an employee for participating in a strike. After the University of Illinois at Chicago and Cook County Health used strikebreakers from COVID hotspot states without requiring them to quarantine, Gonzalez and union representatives worked together to end this decades-old tactic.

In 2023, he sponsored the Temp Worker Fairness and Safety Act, which improved conditions for day laborers and temporary workers in the state. The act focused on equal pay for equal work and end the corporate habit of "permatemping" its employees, improved training and worker safety standards, and the right to refuse strike-breaking assignments through notice in a language the worker can understand.

As of July 15, 2025, Gonzalez is a member of the following Illinois House committees:

- Cybersecurity, Data Analytics, & IT (HCDA)
- Ethics & Elections (SHEE)
- Gaming (HOGC)
- Insurance (HINS)
- Judiciary - Criminal (HJUC)
- Labor & Commerce (HLBR)
- Revenue & Finance (HREF)
- Small Business, Tech Innovation (SBTE)
- Transportation: Vehicles & Safety (HVES)

At the start of the 104th General Assembly, Speaker Emanuel "Chris" Welch named Gonzalez to serve on his leadership team as an Assistant Majority Leader and Floor Whip for the seventy-eight member Democratic caucus.

== Electoral history ==
Illinois 21st Representative District Democratic Primary, 2020
Party	Candidate	Votes	%
Democratic	Edgar Gonzalez Jr.	9,048	100.0
Total votes		9,048	100.0

Illinois 21st Representative District General Election, 2020
Party	Candidate	Votes	%
Democratic	Edgar Gonzalez Jr.	22,403	100.0
Total votes		22,403	100.0

Illinois 23rd Representative District Democratic Primary, 2022
Party	Candidate	Votes	%
Democratic	Edgar Gonzalez Jr.	2,884	100.0
Total votes		22,403	100.0

Illinois 23rd Representative District General Election, 2022
Party	Candidate	Votes	%
Democratic	Edgar Gonzalez Jr.	7,832	82.00
Republican	Lupe Castillo	1,719	18.00
Total votes		9,551	100.0

Illinois 23rd Representative District Democratic Primary, 2024
Party	Candidate	Votes	%
Democratic	Edgar Gonzalez Jr.	3,191	79.58
Democratic	Joseph Edward Mercado	819	20.42
Total votes		4,010	100.0

Illinois 23rd Representative District General Election, 2024
Party	Candidate	Votes	%
Democratic	Edgar Gonzalez Jr.	13,764	100.00
Total votes		13,764	100.00
