= Michael R. Zalewski =

American politician

Member of the Chicago City Council for the 23rd ward
- In office May 1995 – May 31, 2018
- Preceded by: James Laski
- Succeeded by: Silvana Tabares

Personal details
- Born: July 26, 1954 (age 72) Chicago, Illinois, U.S.
- Party: Democratic

Michael R. Zalewski (born July 26, 1954) was alderman of the 23rd ward of the City of Chicago from May 1995 to his retirement on May 31, 2018.

At the time of his retirement from the Chicago City Council, Zalewski served on five committees: Aviation; Budget and Government Operations; Committees, Rules and Ethics; Energy, Environmental Protection and Public Utilities; Finance; and License and Consumer Protection.

He was elected in 1995, and was considered an ally of Mayor Daley. After Mayor Richard M. Daley's September 7, 2010, announcement to not seek re-election Zalewski's name was mentioned by one local political pundit as a possible mayoral candidate in the Chicago mayoral election, 2011. He announced in April 2018 that he would retire from his position May 31, 2018, approximately one year before his term would have ended.

His son, Michael J. Zalewski, was a state representative.
