= 2019 Chicago mayoral election =

- February 26, 2019 (first round); April 2, 2019 (runoff)
- Turnout: 35.20% ▼5.78 pp (first round); 32.89% ▼2.31 pp (second round)
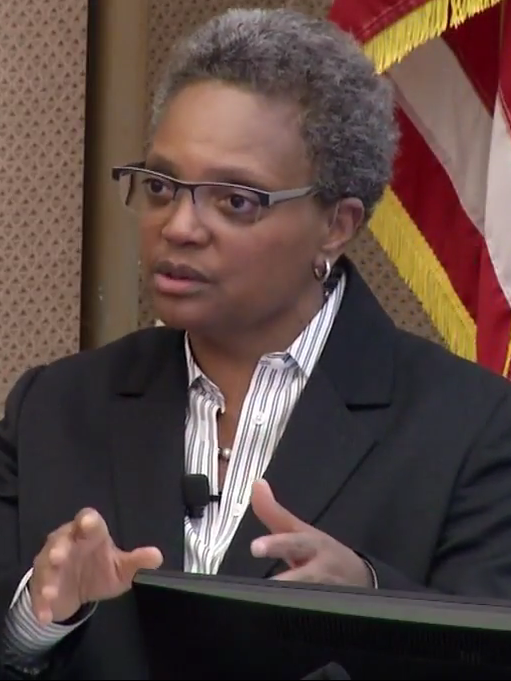

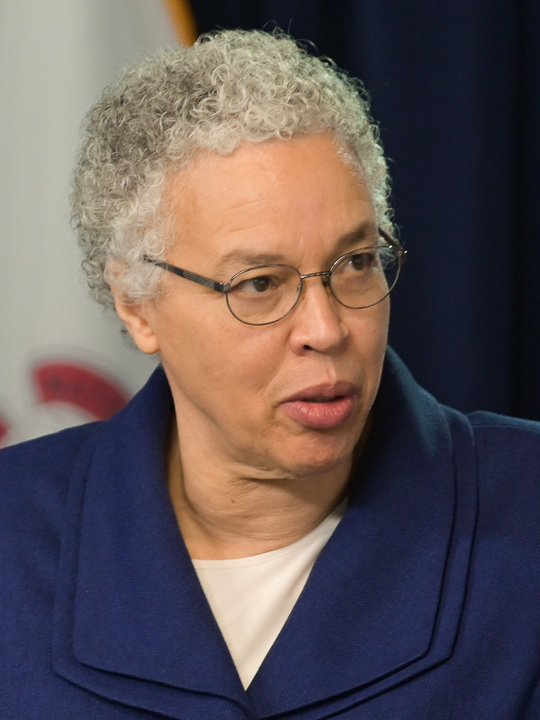

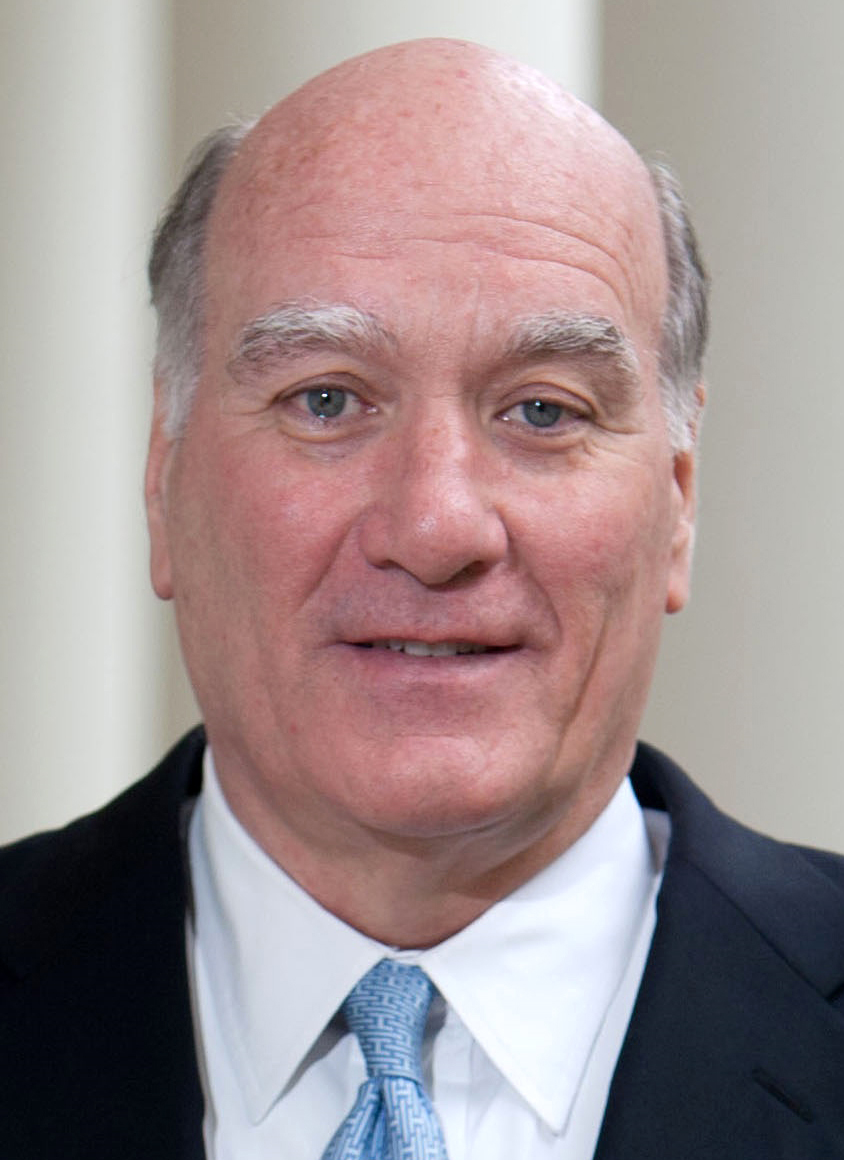

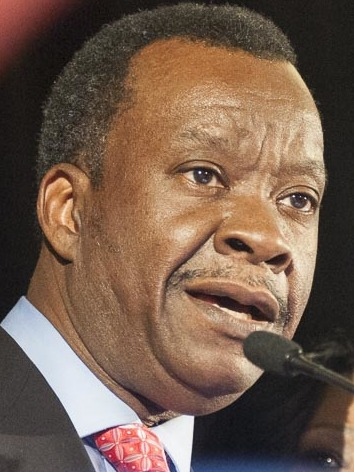

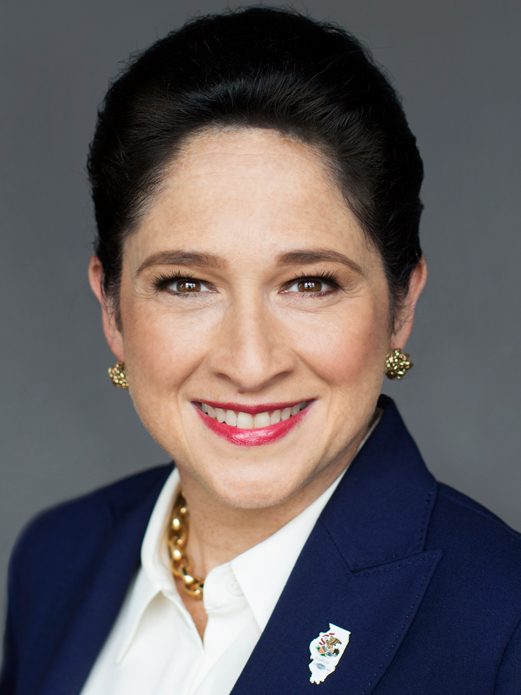

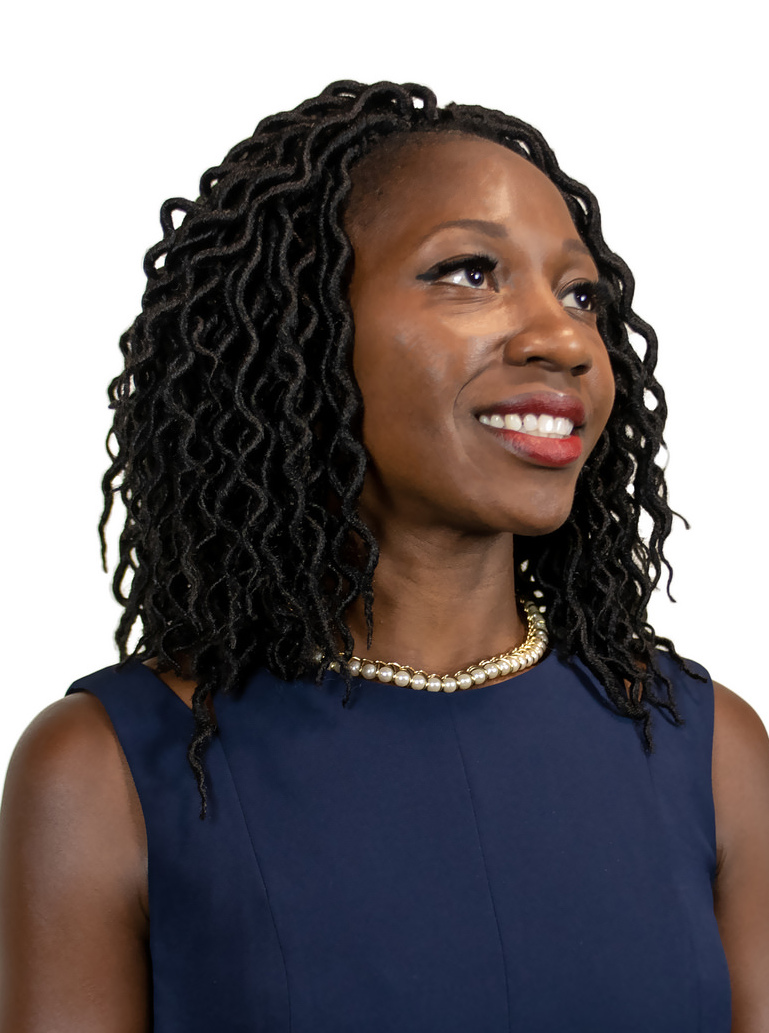

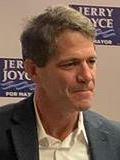

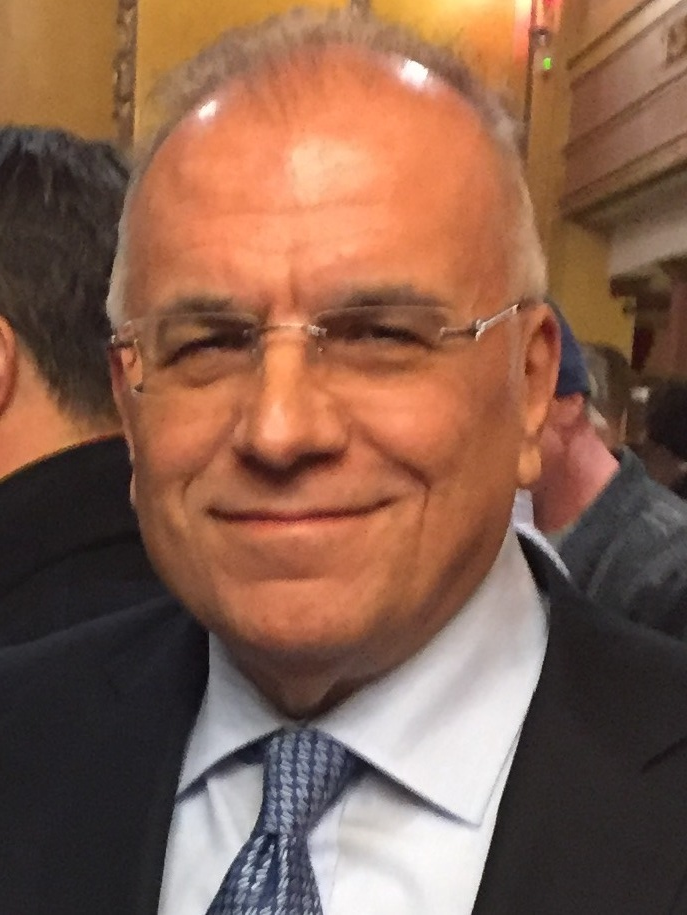

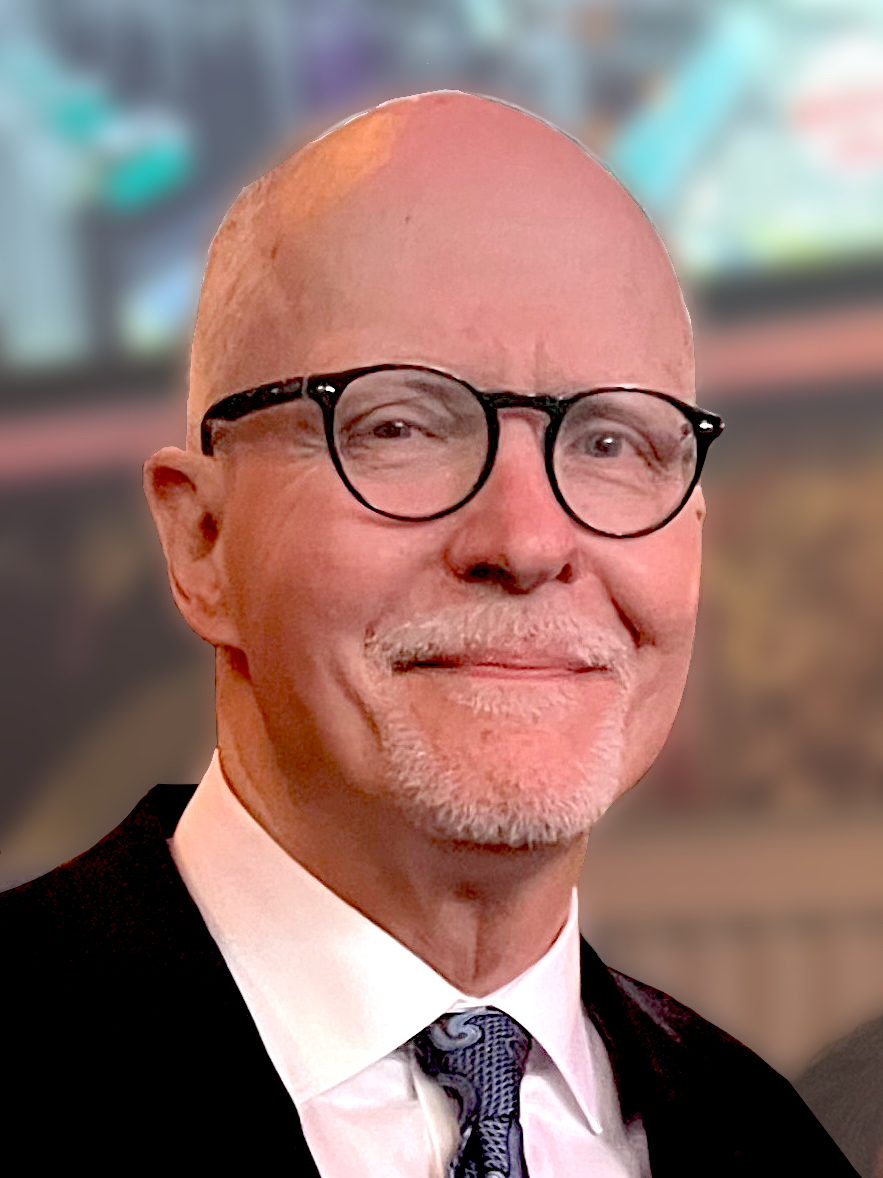
Candidate	Lori Lightfoot	Toni Preckwinkle	Bill Daley
First round	97,667; 17.54%	89,343; 16.04%	82,294; 14.78%
Runoff	386,039; 73.70%	137,765; 26.30%	Eliminated
Candidate	Willie Wilson	Susana Mendoza	Amara Enyia
First round	59,072; 10.61%	50,373; 9.05%	44,589; 8.00%
Runoff	Eliminated	Eliminated	Eliminated
Candidate	Jerry Joyce	Gery Chico	Paul Vallas
First round	40,099; 7.20%	34,521; 6.20%	30,236; 5.43%
Runoff	Eliminated	Eliminated	Eliminated
- Lightfoot: 50-60% 60-70% 70-80% 80-90% >90% Preckwinkle : 50–60% 60–70% Tie: 50%
Mayor before election
Rahm Emanuel
Elected Mayor
Lori Lightfoot

The 2019 Chicago mayoral election was held on February 26, 2019, to determine the next Mayor of the City of Chicago, Illinois. Since no candidate received a majority of votes, a runoff election was held on April 2, 2019, between the two candidates with the most votes, Lori Lightfoot and Toni Preckwinkle. Lightfoot defeated Preckwinkle in the runoff election to become mayor, and was sworn in as mayor on May 20, 2019.

The election was officially non-partisan, with its winner being elected to a four-year term. The elections were part of the 2019 Chicago elections, which included elections for City Council, City Clerk, and City Treasurer.

Incumbent Mayor Rahm Emanuel initially announced he would run for a third term but withdrew in September 2018. Emanuel was first elected in 2011 (winning in the first round with 55.19% of the vote) and re-elected in 2015 (receiving 55.7% of the vote in the runoff election).

The runoff was historic, as it assured Chicago would elect its first African-American female mayor, its second elected African-American Mayor, after Harold Washington, and its second female mayor, after Jane Byrne. Not only is Lightfoot the first African-American woman mayor in Chicago's history, but she is also the first openly LGBT person to lead Chicago. Lightfoot's election made Chicago the largest city won by an African American woman, as well as the largest by an openly LGBT person, in United States history.

== Campaign ==
=== First round ===
Incumbent mayor Rahm Emanuel declared his intent to seek re-election on October 17, 2017. One month later, Troy LaRaviere became the first opponent to declare their intent to run against Emanuel.

Later, in 2018, more opponents would declare their intent to run against Emanuel, with Garry McCarthy and Willie Wilson doing so in March, Dorothy A. Brown Cook, Ja'Mal Green, and Neal Sáles-Griffin doing so in April, Lori Lightfoot, John Kozlar, and Paul Vallas doing so in May, Matthew Rooney doing so in June, and Amara Enyia and Jerry Joyce doing so in August. By the end of the Summer of 2018, a dozen individuals had declared their candidacies.

On September 4, 2018, Emanuel announced that he would no longer be seeking re-election. Emanuel's announcement shook up the race, with many new candidates declaring their candidacies for mayor in the weeks that followed.

In late November, much of the media coverage on the race showed Toni Preckwinkle and Susana Mendoza (both of whom had entered the race after Emanuel bowed out) to be considered its two frontrunners.

The race for mayor was upended by Alderman Ed Burke's corruption scandal. Mayoral candidates Toni Preckwinkle, Susana Mendoza, Gery Chico, and Bill Daley all had connections to the disgraced alderman, and the scandal encouraged an anti-corruption and anti-machine politics sentiment among voters.

A number of issues were debated by the candidates throughout the campaign. One of the major issues was pensions, as the city's annual pensions contribution had been projected to double between 2018 and 2023. Another issue was education, where sub-issues included school closings that had taken place under the Emanuel administration and the possibility of reforming the school-board selection method. Another issue was crime. Particularly in light of cases such as the murder of Laquan McDonald, issues regarding practices by the city's law enforcement were also discussed by candidates. Another issue was the use of tax increment financing by the city. Affordable housing was another issue debated. Ethics reforms were also debated. Taxes were another issue debated, with some candidates advocating for a commuter tax and some candidates advocating for a property tax freeze.

After ballot challenges were settled, a total of fourteen candidates were included on the ballot for the first round of the election. This is the most candidates that have ever been on the ballot in the history of Chicago mayoral elections.

The first round of the election was considered highly competitive to the end, with a number of candidates shown by polls to be viable contenders to potentially advance to the run off. For example, a poll conducted February 11–13 by Mason-Dixon Polling & Research Inc. for the media outlets Telemundo/NBC 5 Chicago illustrated what the outlets described as a tight five-way race between (in alphabetical order) Chico, Daley, Lightfoot, Mendoza, and Preckwinkle. On February 24, The Wall Street Journal described the race's polling as showing six candidates with the possibility of making the runoff, with the five strongest contenders being described as (in alphabetical order) Chico, Daley, Lightfoot, Mendoza, and Preckwinkle. Also on February 24, Chicago magazine wrote that it considered six individuals to have a chance of making the runoff, with those individuals being (in alphabetical order) Chico, Daley, Lightfoot, Mendoza, Preckwinkle, and Wilson.

In the first round, Lori Lightfoot placed first and Toni Preckwinkle placed second, securing them both a spot in the runoff election.

Lightfoot's first-place finish in the first round was regarded to be an upset. She was seen as a long-shot when she first entered the race. In late-January, Lightfoot's support in publicly released polls had only ranged between 2% and 5%. Despite her low poll numbers in January, Lightfoot had persisted in her campaign, performing well in debates and running some ads on television. She won the endorsement of the Chicago Sun-Times. She also garnered new personal endorsements, including those of the Scott Waguespack, David Orr, and Robin Kelly, of whom the Chicago Sun-Times' Mark Brown would later write in exploring the contributing factors to Lightfoot's first-round victory, "none of them heavyweights but influential enough to point the way for progressive voters looking for some sign, any sign, of how to pick their way through the thicket of candidates." While Lightfoot rose to the top of some polls near the end of the race, she had peaked in support so late in the race that none of the other candidates had been focused on running negative ads against her. Lightfoot also was seen as ultimately benefiting from the Burke corruption scandal, as she was running as a "political outsider" on an anti-corruption platform. Preckwinkle's allies had also, accidentally, provided Lightfoot with free media attention on two noteworthy occasions. The first incident occurred February 18, when one of Lightfoot's press conferences was crashed by Preckwinkle ally Robert Martwick, with whom Lightfoot got into a heated exchange. The second incident where Preckwinkle's camp generated free headlines for Lightfoot was when, days before the first round of the election, her campaign manager, Scott Cisek, published a Facebook post likening Lightfoot to a Nazi, leading to his firing by the Preckwinkle campaign.

In Chicago, ethnic/racial coalitions had often played a key role in elections. As such, many of the candidates were seen as targeting different groups with their campaigns. Hispanic candidates Gery Chico and Susana Mendoza were seen as vying for the Hispanic vote. Toni Preckwinkle and Willie Wilson were seen as targeting the black vote. Bill Daley was seen as targeting the white vote. Lightfoot was seen as breaking the rules of traditional Chicago politics by not basing her candidacy on seeking the support of particular ethnic/racial groups.

=== Runoff ===
Throughout the runoff, Lightfoot led Preckwinkle in polls.

For the runoff, Lightfoot received endorsements from seven of the twelve candidates that had been eliminated in the first round (Gery Chico, Jerry Joyce, John Kozlar, Susana Mendoza, Neal Sales-Griffin, Paul Vallas, and Willie Wilson). Preckwinkle, in contrast, received no endorsements from any candidates that had been eliminated in the first round.

In what was considered a "sweep" of the city's major publications, retaining her endorsement from the Chicago Sun-Times, for the runoff, Lightfoot also received the endorsements of the Chicago Tribune and Crain's Chicago Business (both of which had endorsed Bill Daley in the first round).

Both Lightfoot and Preckwinkle positioned themselves as self-declared, "progressives". In a November 2019 retrospective, however, Edward McClelland of Chicago magazine wrote, "Lightfoot didn’t run as a progressive. She ran as a reformer, the political outsider who promised to quash the Chicago Way, as exemplified by Alderman Ed Burke and all the mayoral candidates who took his money. (Lightfoot's opponent, Toni Preckwinkle, ran as a progressive, but not a reformer.)"

In the runoff, Preckwinkle highlighted her depth of government experience and sought to emphasize a contrast with Lightfoot's lack of experience in elected office. Lightfoot criticized Preckwinkle's connections with controversial figures such as Ed Burke and Joseph Berrios.

The two candidates differed on rent control, with Preckwinkle seeking the repeal of a state law prohibiting local governments from imposing rent control, while Lightfoot did not advocate for rent control in Chicago. The candidates differed on prospective term limits, with Preckwinkle opposing them, and Lightfoot advocating limiting both mayoral tenures and City Council committee chairmanships to two terms. Preckwinkle sought to create a ban on aldermen holding outside jobs, while Lightfoot differed, instead preferring to only ban them from holding outside jobs that pose conflicts of interest with official their duties. Preckwinkle wanted the power to draw ward maps to remain in the hands of the City Council, while Lightfoot wanted a non-partisan and independent process to be created for redistricting. Preckwinkle defended retaining the practice of "aldermanic prerogative", while Lightfoot sought to bring an end to the practice. The candidates also differed on whether they would retain incumbent Superintendent of the Chicago Police Department Eddie T. Johnson, with Preckwinkle having stating that she planned to immediately dismiss Johnson of his post, while Lightfoot stated that she planned to retain him at least through the summer of 2019.

Lightfoot ultimately won a landslide victory in the runoff.

== Candidates ==
In order to be listed on the ballot, candidates were required to submit petitions between November 19 and 26.

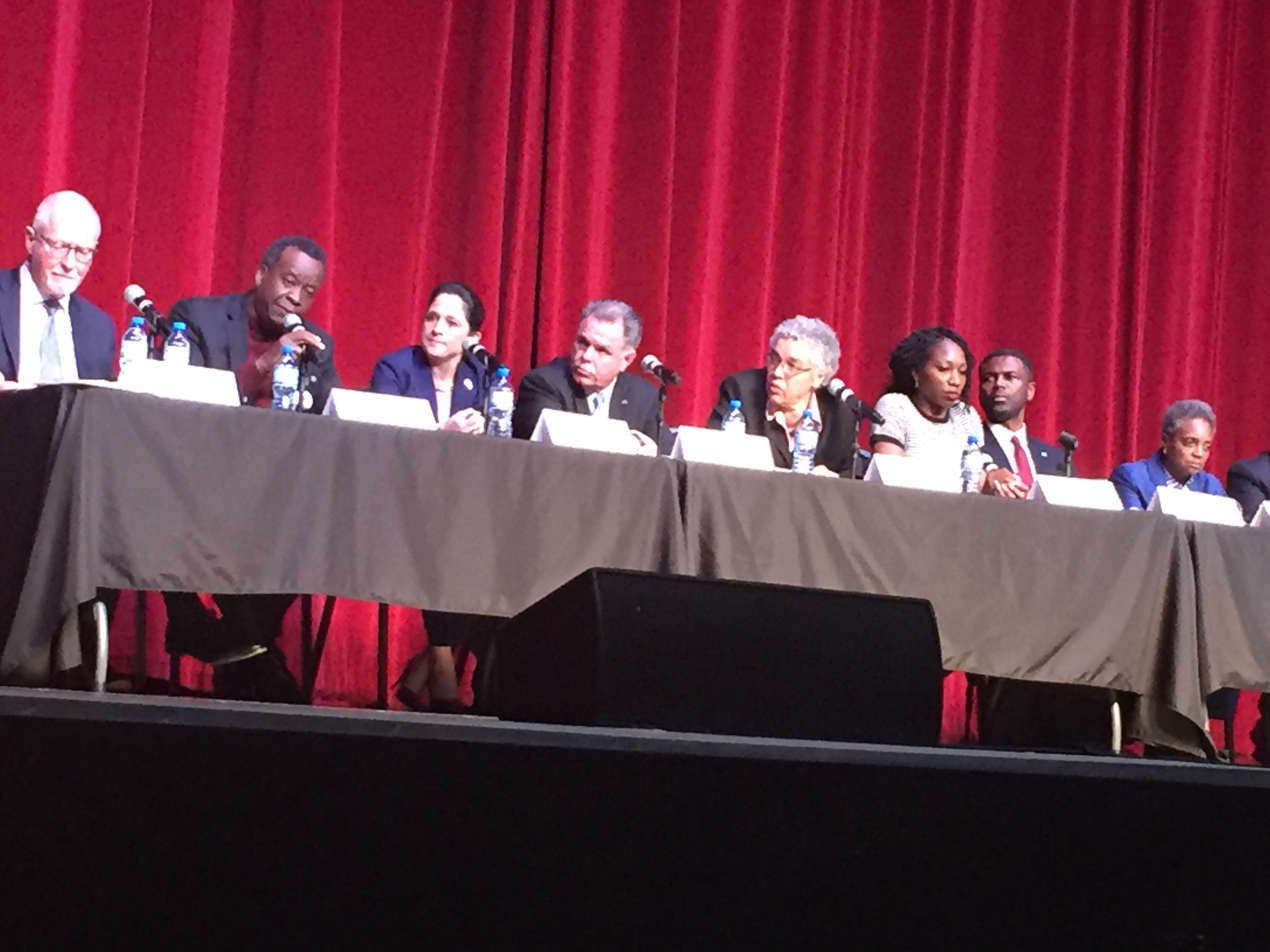
Mayoral candidates at a forum at the Copernicus Center in Chicago's Jefferson Park neighborhood, December 2018

Any certified candidate (those whose petitions had been certified by the Board of Elections) may have had their nomination papers challenged up until December 1. Those candidates with properly-filed challenges against their petitions would have their candidature subjected to hearings and procedures which would assess the validity of their petitions. If any candidate failed to file a statement of economic interests within five days of having their petition certified, then their certification would be revoked.

The deadline to file a notarized declaration of intent to be a write–in candidate was December 27, 2018. An exception to the December 27 deadline for write-in candidates to file their declaration of intent existed for circumstances in which a candidate lost their certification after the December 27 deadline due to the outcome of a challenge to their petitions (candidates in this circumstance were granted until February 19 to file a notarized declaration of intent to run as a write-in candidate).

Certified candidates (those whose petitions had been certified by the Board of Elections) were permitted to have their name removed from the ballot if they officially withdrew any time before December 20, 2018. Even if they informally withdrew by ceasing to campaign, all certified candidates that did not file to formally withdraw before the December 20 deadline would have their names listed on the ballot regardless of whether they were still active contenders. However, after December 20 candidates still may have filed to officially withdraw, an action which would have instructed the Board of Elections to deem all votes cast for the candidates as invalid when tallying votes.

Due to the time needed to complete process of reviewing nearly 200 challenges to candidate petitions in the mayoral race and other municipal elections, the start of the early voting period for the first round had been delayed to January 29 from its previously scheduled January 17 date.

The total of fourteen candidates on the February mayoral ballot is record-setting for Chicago mayoral elections.

=== Candidates who advanced to runoff ===
Candidate	Experience	Announced	Ref
The following candidates advanced to the runoff election held on April 2			
Lori Lightfoot	Former President of the Chicago Police Board 2015–2018 Chair of the Chicago Police Accountability Task Force	May 10, 2018 (Website)	
Toni Preckwinkle	President of the Cook County Board of Commissioners since 2010; Former Alderman from the 4th ward 1991–2010	September 20, 2018 (Website)	

=== Candidates eliminated in the first round ===
Candidate	Experience	Announced	Ref
The following candidates were eliminated in the first round, and did not advance to the runoff election			
Gery Chico	Chair of the Illinois State Board of Education 2011–2015; President of the Chicago Park District Board of Commissioners 2007–2010; President of the Chicago Board of Education 1995–2001	September 17, 2018 (Website)	
Bill Daley	White House Chief of Staff 2011–2012; United States Secretary of Commerce 1997–2000	September 14, 2018 (Website)	
Amara Enyia	Director of the Austin Chamber of Commerce	August 28, 2018 (Website)	
Bob Fioretti	Former Alderman from the 2nd Ward 2007–2015	November 26, 2018 (Website)	
La Shawn Ford	Member of the Illinois House of Representatives since 2007	November 12, 2018 (Website)	
Jerry Joyce	Former Assistant State's Attorney	August 29, 2018 (Website)	
John Kozlar	Candidate for Alderman from the 11th Ward in 2011 and 2015	May 30, 2018 (Website)	
Garry McCarthy	Former Superintendent of the Chicago Police Department 2011–2015	March 21, 2018 (Website)	
Susana Mendoza	Illinois Comptroller since 2016; City Clerk of Chicago 2011–2016; Member of the Illinois House of Representatives 2001–2011	November 14, 2018 (Website)	
Neal Sáles-Griffin	CEO of CodeNow	March 11, 2018 (Website)	
Paul Vallas	Former Chief Executive Officer of Chicago Public Schools 1995–2001	March 28, 2018 (Website)	
Willie Wilson	Businessman; Owner of Omar Medical Supplies	March 29, 2018 (Website)	

==== Write-in candidates ====
A full list of eligible write-ins was made available to precincts on election day.

- Rebecca Ayers
- Catherine Brown D'Tycoon, activist
- Ja'Mal Green, executive director of the Majostee Allstars Community Center and Black Lives Matter activist
- Daniel Fein
- Ryan Friedman
- Stephen Hodge
- John P. Loftus
- Richard Benedict Mayers, perennial candidate and alleged white supremacist, write-in candidate for Chicago City Clerk, Treasurer, and alderman in 2019; congressional candidate in 2000, 2002, 2008, 2016, and 2018; 1998 State House candidate; 1993 Berwyn city clerk and city treasurer candidate
- Tamara McCullough AKA Tamar Manasseh
- Robert A. Palmer
- Ziff A. Sistrunk
- Eric "Kubi" James Stewart
- Romaine Ware
- Roger L. Washington, police officer, educator at Malcolm X College, pastor, candidate for alderman in Chicago's 24th ward in 2015
- Gregory Young

=== Petitions rejected ===
The following candidates had been denied inclusion on the ballot following successful challenges to their petitions:

- Conrien Hykes Clark, octogenarian elementary school volunteer
- Dorothy A. Brown Cook, Clerk of the Circuit Court of Cook County since 2000
- Catherine Brown D'Tycoon, activist subsequently ran as write-in
- Sandra L. Mallory, former local school council president, former Chicago Public Schools security officer, candidate for alderman in Chicago's 15th ward in 2003 and 2015
- Richard Mayers, perennial candidate and alleged white supremacist, congressional candidate in 2000, 2002, 2008, 2016, and 2018; 1998 State House candidate; 1993 Berwyn city clerk and city treasurer candidate subsequently ran as write-in
- Roger L. Washington, police officer, educator at Malcolm X College, pastor, candidate for alderman in Chicago's 24th ward in 2015 subsequently ran as write-in

=== Withdrew ===
The following individuals are previously declared candidates who had terminated their candidacies. Unless otherwise indicated, these individuals did not submit petitions:

- Rahm Emanuel, incumbent Mayor of Chicago
- Ja'Mal Green (had submitted petition), executive director of the Majostee Allstars Community Center and Black Lives Matter activist subsequently ran as write-in
- William J. Kelly, radio host and perennial candidate, candidate for mayor in 2015, gubernatorial candidate in 2018, candidate for state comptroller in 2010, congressional candidate in 1994
- Troy LaRaviere, president of the Chicago Principals and Administrators Association
- Matthew Rooney
- William "Dock" Walls, perennial candidate, candidate for mayor in 2007, 2011, 2015

=== Declined ===
The following were prospective and speculative candidates that declined to run:

- Chance the Rapper, rapper, singer-songwriter, record producer
- Richard Boykin, former member of the Cook County Board of Commissioners
- Anthony Beale, Alderman from the 9th ward
- Walter Burnett Jr., Alderman from the 27th ward
- Tom Dart, Cook County Sheriff
- Arne Duncan, former U.S. Secretary of Education and former CEO of Chicago Public Schools
- Bridget Gainer, member of the Cook County Board of Commissioners
- Chuy García, Congressman from Illinois's 4th congressional district, former member of the Cook County Board of Commissioners and candidate for mayor in 2015
- Luis Gutierrez, former Congressman from Illinois's 4th congressional district
- Valerie Jarrett, former director of the White House Office of Public Engagement and Intergovernmental Affairs
- Ra Joy, executive director of CHANGE Illinois and candidate for lieutenant governor in 2018
- Raymond Lopez, alderman of the 15th Ward
- Lisa Madigan, former Attorney General of Illinois
- Proco Joe Moreno, member of the Chicago City Council from the 1st ward
- David Orr, former Cook County Clerk, former mayor of Chicago 1987–1987;
- Ricardo Muñoz, member of the Chicago City Council from the 22nd ward
- Maria Pappas, Cook County Treasurer
- Ameya Pawar, member of the Chicago City Council, and candidate for governor in 2018
- Mike Quigley, Congressman from Illinois's 5th congressional district
- Pat Quinn, candidate for Illinois Attorney General in 2018, former Governor of Illinois, former Lieutenant Governor of Illinois and former Treasurer of Illinois
- Carlos Ramirez-Rosa, Alderman for the 35th Ward (running for re-election)
- Kwame Raoul, Attorney General of Illinois, former member of the Illinois Senate
- Larry Rogers Jr., commissioner of the Cook County Board of Review
- Michael Sacks, chief executive officer of GCM Grosvenor
- Roderick Sawyer, member of the Chicago City Council and chair of the Chicago City Council Black Caucus
- Kurt Summers, City Treasurer of Chicago
- Pat Tomasulo, sportscaster, comedian
- Tom Tunney, member of the Chicago City Council from the 44th ward
- Anna M. Valencia, Chicago City Clerk
- Scott Waguespack, member of the Chicago City Council and chairman of the council's Progressive Reform Caucus
- Jesse White, Secretary of State of Illinois and former state representative

== Endorsements ==
=== First round ===
Gery Chico

Local officeholders

- Edward M. Burke, Alderman of the 14th Ward
- Raymond Lopez, Alderman of the 15th Ward
Bill Daley

Officeholders

- Howard Dean, former Chair of the Democratic National Committee and former Governor of Vermont
- Al Gore, former Vice President of the United States
- Emil Jones, former Illinois State Senate President
- Joseph P. Kennedy II, former U.S. Representative for Massachusetts' 8th congressional district
- Bobby Rush, U.S. Representative for Illinois's 1st congressional district, Chicago mayoral candidate in 1999

Individuals

- John Canning Jr., businessman
- Kenneth C. Griffin, businessman
- Ozzie Guillén, former Chicago White Sox manager who managed 2005 World Series champions
- Elzie Higginbottom, businessman

Editorial boards

- The Chicago Crusader editorial board
- Chicago Tribune editorial board
- Crain's Chicago Business editorial board

Organizations

- Plumbers Local Union 130
Amara Enyia

Officeholders

- Dorothy A. Brown, Clerk of the Circuit Court of Cook County (formerly a candidate for mayor)

Individuals

- Chance the Rapper, popular musician, activist, and Chicago native and resident
- Kanye West, popular musician, entrepreneur and fashion designer, and Chicago native
Jerry Joyce

Officeholders

- Matthew O'Shea, Chicago alderman
- Michael F. Sheahan, former Cook County Sheriff
Lori Lightfoot

Officeholders

- Robin Kelly, U.S. Representative from Illinois's 2nd congressional district
- Martin J. Oberman, former Chicago alderman
- David Orr, former Acting Mayor of Chicago and County Clerk of Cook County
- Dick Simpson, former Chicago alderman
- Scott Waguespack, Chicago alderman and chair of the City Council's Progressive Reform Caucus
- Litesa Wallace, former member of the Illinois House of Representatives and candidate for Lieutenant Governor of Illinois in 2018

Individuals

- Ra Joy, candidate for Lieutenant Governor of Illinois in 2018

Editorial boards

- Chicago Sun-Times editorial board
- The Gazette editorial board

Organizations

- Chicago Democracy for America
- Equality Illinois PAC
- Illinois Education Association Region 67
- Indivisible IL9 Andersonville-Edgewater
- LGBTQ Victory Fund
- LPAC
Garry McCarthy

Officeholders

- Rudy Giuliani, former Mayor of New York
Susana Mendoza

State officeholders

- Stacey Abrams, former member of the Georgia House of Representatives and 2018 Democratic nominee for Governor of Georgia

Individuals

- Dolores Huerta, labor activist
- Laura Ricketts, co-owner of the Chicago Cubs, board member of Lambda Legal
- Bradley Tusk, venture-capitalist

Editorial boards

- The Columbia Chronicle editorial board

Organizations

- Chicago Federation of Musicians (American Federation of Musicians)
- Illinois Nurses Association
- Latino Victory Fund
- LIUNA Chicago Laborers' District Council
  - LIUNA Great Lakes Region
- Painter's District Council #14
- UAW
- UFCW 1546
Toni Preckwinkle

U.S. Executive Branch officials

- Valerie Jarrett, former Director of the Office of Public Engagement and Intergovernmental Affairs
- Desirée Rogers, former White House Social Secretary
- Tina Tchen, Chief of Staff to First Lady Michelle Obama, Executive Director of the (Obama) White House Council on Women and Girls, former Director of Office of Public Engagement and Intergovernmental Affairs

Members of Congress

- Jan Schakowsky, U.S. Representative from Illinois's 9th congressional district

State officeholders

- Omar Aquino, member of the Illinois Senate
- Marcus C. Evans Jr., member of Illinois House
- Will Guzzardi, member of Illinois House
- Robert Peters, member of Illinois Senate
- Delia Ramirez, member of Illinois House
- Lamont Robinson, member of Illinois House
- Ram Villivalam, member of Illinois Senate

County officeholders

- Brandon Johnson, Cook County Commissioner
- Josina Morita, commissioner of the Metropolitan Water Reclamation District of Greater Chicago
- Stanley Moore, member of the Cook County Board of Commissioners and former Chicago alderman

Local officeholders

- Leslie Hairston, Chicago alderman of the 5th ward
- Sophia King, Chicago alderman of the 4th ward
- Carlos Ramirez-Rosa, Chicago alderman of the 35th ward
- Roderick Sawyer, Chicago alderman and chair of the Chicago City Council Black Caucus

Individuals

- Karen Lewis, former president of the Chicago Teachers Union
- Cecile Richards, former president of Planned Parenthood

Editorial boards

- The Chicago Maroon editorial board
- Hyde Park Herald editorial board

Organizations

- Chicago Teachers Union (AFT Local 1) and Cook County College Teachers Union (AFT Local 1600)
- Illinois Chapter of the National Association of Social Workers
- Indo-American Democratic Organization
- SEIU Healthcare Illinois
- SEIU Local 1
- SEIU Local 73
- Sierra Club Chicago
- United Food and Commercial Workers Local 881
Paul Vallas

Individuals

- Deborah Lynch, former President of the Chicago Teachers Union

Organizations

- Chicago Republican Party
Willie Wilson

Officeholders

- Richard Boykin, former member of the Cook County Board of Commissioners
- Danny K. Davis, U.S. Representative from Illinois's 7th congressional district
- Sean M. Morrison, member of the Cook County Board of Commissioners and chair of the Cook County Republican Party
- Robert Shaw, former commissioner of the Cook County Board of Review and former Chicago alderman

Organizations

- Chicago Libertarian Party
- Cook County Republican Party
- Chicago Young Republicans
- Northwest Side GOP Club

=== Runoff ===
Lori Lightfoot

Members of Congress

- Jesús "Chuy" García, U.S. Representative from Illinois's 4th congressional district, Chicago mayoral candidate in 2015
- Robin Kelly, U.S. Representative from Illinois's 2nd congressional district
- Mike Quigley, U.S. Representative from Illinois's 5th congressional district

State officeholders

- Kelly Cassidy, member of the Illinois House of Representatives
- Gery Chico, former Chair of the Illinois State Board of Education, Chicago mayoral candidate in 2011 and 2019
- Miguel del Valle, former member of Illinois Senate, former City Clerk of Chicago, Chicago mayoral candidate in 2011
- Tyrone C. Fahner, former Illinois Attorney General
- Sara Feigenholtz, member of the Illinois House of Representatives
- Susana Mendoza, Illinois Comptroller and Chicago mayoral candidate in 2019
- Gilbert Villegas, Chicago alderman from the 36th Ward and former Chief of Staff of the Illinois Capital Development Board
- Litesa Wallace, former member of the Illinois House of Representatives and candidate for Lieutenant Governor of Illinois in 2018
- Ann Williams, member of the Illinois House of Representatives

Local officeholders

- John Arena, Chicago alderman from the 45th Ward
- Anthony Beale, Chicago alderman from the 9th Ward
- George Cardenas, Alderman of the 12th Ward
- Derrick Curtis, Chicago alderman from the 18 Ward
- Deb Mell, Chicago alderman from the 33rd Ward
- Emma Mitts, Chicago alderman from the 37th Ward
- Anthony Napolitano, Chicago alderman from the 41st Ward
- Martin J. Oberman, former Chicago alderman
- David Orr, former Acting Mayor of Chicago and County Clerk of Cook County
- Matthew O'Shea, Chicago alderman from the 19th Ward
- Annise Parker, former Mayor of Houston
- Brendan Reilly, Chicago alderman from the 42nd Ward
- Nancy Rotering, mayor of Highland Park, Illinois, candidate for Illinois Attorney General in 2018 and Congress in 2016
- Dick Simpson, former Chicago alderman
- Michael Scott Jr., Alderman of the 24th Ward
- Nicholas Sposato, Alderman of the 38th Ward
- Tom Tunney, Alderman of the 44th Ward
- Paul Vallas, former CEO of Chicago Public Schools, nominee for lieutenant governor of Illinois in 2014, Chicago mayoral candidate in 2019
- Scott Waguespack, Alderman of the 32nd Ward and chair of the City Council's Progressive Reform Caucus

Individuals

- John Canning Jr., businessman
- Paul Finnegan businessman
- Ja'Mal Green, activist and Chicago mayoral candidate in 2019
- Craig Duchossois, businessman and chairman of the Duchossois Group
- Ra Joy, candidate for Lieutenant Governor of Illinois in 2018
- Jerry Joyce, former assistant State's Attorney, Chicago mayoral candidate in 2019
- John Kozlar, Chicago aldermanic candidate in 2015, Chicago mayoral candidate in 2019
- Michael Pfleger, Roman Catholic priest of the Archdiocese of Chicago and social activist
- Laura Ricketts, Chicago Cubs co-owner
- Neal Sales-Griffin, entrepreneur and Chicago mayoral candidate in 2019
- Che "Rhymefest" Smith, musician, philanthropist, and Chicago aldermanic candidate in 2011
- Gloria Steinem, Feminist activist and journalist
- Willie Wilson, businessman, Chicago mayoral candidate in 2015 and 2019, presidential candidate in 2016

Editorial boards/publishers

- Chicago Sun-Times editorial board
- Chicago Tribune editorial board
- Crain's Chicago Business editorial board
- The Gazette editorial board
- N'Digo

Organizations

- Amalgamated Transit Union Local 241
- Amalgamated Transit Union Local 308
- Chicagoland Chamber of Commerce
- Chicago Firefighters Union Local 2
- City College Contingent Labor Organizing Committee
- Democracy for America
- Equality Illinois PAC
- Gas Workers Local 18007
- Human Rights Campaign
- Illinois Education Association Region 67
- Illinois Nurses Association PAC
- Indivisible IL9 Andersonville-Edgewater
- International Brotherhood of Electrical Workers Local 9
- Iron Workers Chicago District Council
- Iron Workers Local 1
- Latino Leadership Council
- LGBTQ Victory Fund
- LIUNA Chicago Laborers' District Council
- LiUNA Local 1001
- LPAC
- Our Revolution Chicago
- Plumbers Local Union 130
- Sprinkler Fitters Local 281
- National Association of Letter Carriers Branch 11
- Teamsters Local 705
- Teamsters Local 727
- UNITE HERE Local 1
- United Steelworkers of America Local 9777
Toni Preckwinkle

U.S. Executive Branch officials

- Valerie Jarrett, former Director of the Office of Public Engagement and Intergovernmental Affairs
- Desirée Rogers, former White House Social Secretary
- Tina Tchen, Chief of Staff to First Lady Michelle Obama, Executive Director of the (Obama) White House Council on Women and Girls, former Director of Office of Public Engagement and Intergovernmental Affairs

Members of Congress

- Carol Moseley Braun, former US Senator for Illinois 1993–1999, Chicago mayoral candidate in 2011, and candidate for President in 2004
- Danny K. Davis, U.S. Representative from Illinois's 7th congressional district, Chicago mayoral candidate in 1991 and 2011
- Bobby Rush, U.S. Representative from Illinois's 1st congressional district, Chicago mayoral candidate in 1999
- Jan Schakowsky, U.S. Representative from Illinois's 9th congressional district

State officeholders

- Omar Aquino, member of the Illinois Senate
- Kam Buckner, member of the Illinois House
- Jacqueline Y. Collins, member of the Illinois Senate
- Marcus C. Evans Jr., member of Illinois House
- Will Guzzardi, member of Illinois House
- Mattie Hunter, member of the Illinois Senate
- Camille Lilly, member of the Illinois House
- Theresa Mah, member of the Illinois House
- Iris Martinez, member of the Illinois Senate
- Robert Martwick, member of the Illinois House
- Robert Peters, member of Illinois Senate
- Delia Ramirez, member of Illinois House
- Lamont Robinson, member of Illinois House
- Elgie Sims, member of the Illinois Senate
- Justin Slaughter, member of the Illinois House
- Ram Villivalam, member of Illinois Senate
- Jesse White, Illinois Secretary of State

County officeholders

- Michael Cabonargi, member of the Cook County Board of Review
- Kimberly du Buclet, member of the Metropolitan Water Reclamation District Board of Commissioners
- Dennis Deer, member of the Cook County Board of Commissioners
- Bridget Gainer, member of the Cook County Board of Commissioners
- Bill Lowry, member of the Cook County Board of Commissioners
- Josina Morita, commissioner of the Metropolitan Water Reclamation District of Greater Chicago
- Brandon Johnson, member of the Cook County Board of Commissioners
- Stanley Moore, member of the Cook County Board of Commissioners and former Chicago alderman
- Todd Stroger, former President of the Cook County Board of Commissioners

Local officeholders

- Carrie Austin, Chicago alderman from the 34th Ward
- Howard Brookins, Chicago alderman from the 21st Ward
- Walter Burnett Jr., Chicago alderman from the 27th Ward
- Patrick Daley Thompson, Chicago alderman from the 11th Ward
- Pat Dowell, Chicago alderman from the 3rd Ward
- Jason Ervin, Chicago alderman from the 28th Ward
- Leslie Hairston, Chicago alderman from the 5th Ward
- Michelle A. Harris, Chicago alderman from the 8th Ward
- Larry Huggins, former chairman of the board of Metra
- Sophia King, Chicago alderman from the 4th ward
- Greg Mathis, former judge on the 36th District Court of the State of Michigan, star of Judge Mathis
- Gregory Mitchell, Chicago alderman from the 7th Ward
- Carlos Ramirez-Rosa, Chicago alderman from the 35th Ward
- Roderick Sawyer, Chicago alderman from the 6th Ward and Chair of the Chicago City Council Black Caucus
- Chris Taliaferro, Chicago alderman from the 29th Ward

Individuals

- Chance the Rapper, popular musician, activist, and Chicago native and resident
- Elzie Higginbottom, businessman
- Karen Lewis, former president of the Chicago Teachers Union
- Cecile Richards, former president of Planned Parenthood
- John W. Rogers Jr., Obama Foundation member and co-chair of the 2009 Obama Inauguration Committee
- Howard A. Tullman, venture capitalist

Editorial boards

- Chicago Crusader editorial board
- The Chicago Maroon editorial board
- Hyde Park Herald editorial board

Organizations

- Chicago NOW
- Illinois Federation of Teachers (AFT) Chicago Teachers Union (AFT Local 1) and Cook County College Teachers Union (AFT Local 1600)
- Illinois Chapter of the National Association of Social Workers
- International Union of Operating Engineers Local 339
- Iron Workers Local 63
- ONE People's Campaign
- Painters District Council #14
- Personal PAC
- SEIU Healthcare Illinois
- SEIU Local 1 and SEIU Local 73
- Sierra Club Chicago
- Teamsters Joint Council 25 and Teamsters Local 700
- United Food and Commercial Workers Local 881

== Fundraising ==
=== First round ===
Campaign finance reports as of February 25, 2019
Candidate	Total receipts
Bill Daley	$8,746,398.81
Toni Preckwinkle	$4,621,770.23
Gery Chico	$3,043,467.45
Jerry Joyce	$2,796,317.32
Susana Mendoza	$2,788,787.02
Lori Lightfoot	$1,620,123.65
Willie Wilson	$1,619,088.16
Garry McCarthy	$1,391,426.80
Paul Vallas	$1,128,992.78
Robert Fioretti	$716,729.31
Amara Enyia	$654,771.31
Neal Sales-Griffin	$153,781.73
LaShawn Ford	$96,907.58
John Kozlar	$1,014.00

=== Runoff ===
Note that following totals include the amount raised in both rounds of the election

Campaign finance reports as of April 7, 2019
Candidate	Total receipts
Toni Preckwinkle	$7,114,662.62
Lori Lightfoot	$5,773,302.07

== Polling ==
=== First round ===
View source data.

Poll source	Date(s) administered	Sample size	Margin of error	Dorothy Brown Cook	Gery Chico	Bill Daley	Amara Enyia	Bob Fioretti	La Shawn Ford	Jerry Joyce	John Kozlar	Lori Lightfoot	Garry McCarthy	Susana Mendoza	Toni Preckwinkle	Neal Sales-Griffin	Paul Vallas	Willie Wilson	Undecided	Other
Change Research	February 22–23, 2019	706	±3.7%	–	9%	14%	4%	2%	1%	8%	0%	14%	5%	10%	14%	1%	6%	9%	–	–
L2T Research & Survey (Vallas)	February 21, 2019	8,700	–	–	–	10.16%	–	–	–	–	–	–	–	6.29%	8.64%	–	10.75%	–	64.17%	–
Joyce campaign-sponsored poll	February 14–15, 2019	–	–	–	11%	11%	–	–	–	10%	–	18%	–	11%	14%	–	–	12%	–	–
Independent poll	February 12–14, 2019	–	–	–	14%	15%	–	–	–	–	–	14%	–	10%	12%	–	–	–	–	–
Mason Dixon	February 11–13, 2019	–	±4.0%	–	9%	13%	7%	1%	1%	4%	0%	10%	3%	12%	14%	1%	2%	4%	19%	–
Tulchin Research	February 6–10, 2019	500 (LV)	±4.38	–	5%	10%	8%	–	1%	–	–	9%	5%	10%	21%	–	7%	11%	13%	–
Ogden & Fry	February 9, 2019	716	±3.74%	–	7.1%	11.9%	–	–	–	–	–	–	–	5.7%	16.1%	–	–	13.3%	25.6%	20.4%
Campaign-sponsored poll	–	–	–	–	11%	14%	7%	–	–	–	–	7%	–	7%	16%	–	–	–	–	–
Victory Research	January 26–29, 2019	801	±3.46%	–	8.4%	13.9%	2.0%	6.1%	1.1%	1.0%	0.5%	4.1%	5.1%	12.4%	11.5%	0.0%	5.6%	12.2%	16.1%	–
We Ask America	January 21–23, 2019	644	±3.5%	4̶.̶7̶%̶	9.3%	12.1%	3.1%	0.9%	1.2%	0.9%	0.6%	2.8%	3.7%	8.7%	12.7%	0.0%	4.3%	9%	–	–
David Binder Research	January 19–21, 2019	500	±4.4%	–	4%	9%	5%	–	–	–	–	5%	4%	9%	15%	–	4%	6%	34%	–
Global Strategy Group (Mendoza)	January 10–15, 2019	600	±4.0%	–	–	9%	–	–	–	–	–	–	–	11%	11%	–	–	–	–	–
David Binder Research	December 12–16, 2018	500	±4.4%	–	1%	10%	6%	–	–	–	–	5%	6%	11%	24%	–	7%	6%	19%	–
Lake Research Partners	December 11–16, 2018	600	±4.0%	4%	5%	10%	7%	1%	1%	–	–	5%	7%	12%	18%	–	6%	6%	19%	–
Tulchin Research	December 10–16, 2018	600	±4.0%	–	3%	10%	6%	–	2%	–	–	3%	8%	12%	22%	–	10%	7%	19%	–
ALG Research	December 4–9, 2018	600	–	6%	3%	9%	5%	–	–	–	–	4%	7%	16%	21%	–	6%	8%	–	–
ALG Research	December 4–9, 2018	600	–	4%	4%	12%	4%	–	–	–	–	3%	6%	20%	22%	–	–	7%	–	–
Global Strategy Group	November 8–11, 2018	–	±4.0%	–	–	16%	–	–	–	–	–	–	8%	24%	19%	–	7%	9%	–	–
Global Strategy Group	November 8–11, 2018	–	±4.0%	–	–	9%	–	–	–	–	–	–	7%	13%	15%	–	6%	8%	–	–

Early polling
Poll source	Date(s) administered	Sample size	Margin of error	Dorothy Brown Cook	Bill Daley	Rahm Emanuel	Bridget Gainer	Chuy Garcia	Luis Gutierrez	Valerie Jarrett	Jerry Joyce	Lori Lightfoot	Garry McCarthy	Susana Mendoza	Rick Munoz	Toni Preckwinkle	Kurt Summers	Paul Vallas	Willie Wilson	Other	Undecided
RABA Research	September 10, 2018		±4%	–	–	–	–	–	21%	–	–	10%	18%	–	–	16%	4%	10%	–	7%	15%
Public Policy Polling, Toni Preckwinkle (D)	September 9, 2018	600	±4.9%	–	–	–	–	–	–	–	–	–	13%	–	–	25%	–	16%	10%	–	19%
We Ask America	September 4, 2018	1,128	±3.0%	–	1.8%	–	–	3.9%	–	6.6%	3.2%	9.6%	16.8%	1.4%	1.4%	4.6%	–	10.1%	15.1%	8.7%	16.8%
Public Policy Polling	August 2018	722	±5.0%	–	–	24%	–	–	–	–	–	–	11%	–	–	–	–	10%	–	–	–
Global Strategy Group	July 22–29, 2018	600	±4.0%	6%	–	32%	1%	–	–	–	–	8%	13%	–	–	–	–	9%	8%	–	–
Lori Lightfoot (D)	July 7–9, 2018	800	±3.5%	15%	–	34%	–	–	–	–	–	3%	16%	–	–	–	–	9%	–	–	–

=== Runoff ===
View source data.

Poll source	Date(s) administered	Sample size	Margin of error	Lori Lightfoot	Toni Preckwinkle	Undecided
Temkin/Harris with Normington, Petts & Associates	March 18–20, 2019	500	±4.4%	53%	17%	29%
Jason McGrath (Lightfoot)	February 28 – March 3, 2019	799	±3.5%	59%	29%	–
FM3	February 27–28, 2019	400 (LV)	±4.9%	58%	30%	12%
Change Research	February 22–23, 2019	706	±3.7%	42%	25%	–

Ward poll(s)
The following are runoff polls limited to voters in a single ward:

Ward	Poll source	Date(s) administered	Sample size	Margin of error	Lori Lightfoot	Toni Preckwinkle	Undecided
2nd	Poll for Brian K. Hopkins aldermanic campaign	Mid-March 2019			68%	20%	–

==== Hypothetical runoff polling ====
Dorothy Brown Cook vs. Rahm Emanuel

Poll source	Date(s) administered	Sample size	Margin of error	Dorothy Brown Cook	Rahm Emanuel	Undecided
Public Policy Polling	August 2018	722	±7.0%	26%	43%	31%

Gery Chico vs. Susana Mendoza

with Gery Chico and Susana Mendoza

Poll source	Date(s) administered	Sample size	Margin of error	Gery Chico	Susana Mendoza
ALG Research	December 4–9, 2018	600	–	23%	58%

Bill Daley vs. Lori Lightfoot

Poll source	Date(s) administered	Sample size	Margin of error	Bill Daley	Lori Lightfoot	Undecided
Change Research	February 22–23, 2019	706	±3.7%	35%	40%	25%

Bill Daley vs. Susana Mendoza

Poll source	Date(s) administered	Sample size	Margin of error	Bill Daley	Susana Mendoza
ALG Research	December 4–9, 2018	600	–	29%	56%
ALG Research	December 4–9, 2018	600	–	32%	56%
Global Strategy Group	November 8–11, 2018	600	±4.0%	29%	47%
Global Strategy Group	November 8–11, 2018	600	±4.0%	21%	55%

Bill Daley vs. Toni Preckwinkle
View source data.

Poll source	Date(s) administered	Sample size	Margin of error	Bill Daley	Toni Preckwinkle	Undecided
Change Research	February 22–23, 2019	706	±3.7%	39%	32%	–
Tulchin Research	February 6–10, 2019	500 (LV)	±4.38	38%	50%	12%
We Ask America	January 10–15, 2019	644	±4.0%	40.1%	38.2%	21.7%
Tulchin Research	December 10–16, 2018	600	±4.0%	31%	49%	20%
ALG Research	December 4–9, 2018	600	–	32%	51%	
ALG Research	December 4–9, 2018	600	–	34%	50%	

Susana Mendoza v. Garry McCarthy

Poll source	Date(s) administered	Sample size	Margin of error	Susana Mendoza	Garry McCarthy	Undecided
We Ask America	January 10–15, 2019	644	±4.0%	54%	24.2%	21.7%

Susana Mendoza vs. Toni Preckwinkle
View source data.

Poll source	Date(s) administered	Sample size	Margin of error	Susana Mendoza	Toni Preckwinkle	Undecided
Tulchin Research	February 6–10, 2019	500 (LV)	±4.38	39%	46%	18%
We Ask America	January 10–15, 2019	644	±4.0%	43.5%	35.1%	21.4%
Global Strategy Group	January 10–15, 2019	600	±4.0%	43%	30%	
Tulchin Research	December 10–16, 2018	600	±4.0%	39%	42%	19%
ALG Research	December 4–9, 2018	600	–	45%	39%	
ALG Research	December 4–9, 2018	600	–	44%	44%	12%
Global Strategy Group	November 8–11, 2018	600	±4.0%	47%	35%	
Global Strategy Group	November 8–11, 2018	600	±4.0%	39%	34%	

Rahm Emanuel vs. Lori Lightfoot

Poll source	Date(s) administered	Sample size	Margin of error	Rahm Emanuel	Lori Lightfoot	Undecided
Public Policy Polling	August 2018	722		38%	33%	20%
Jason McGrath (Lightfoot)	July 7–9, 2018	800	±0%	40%	50%	–

Rahm Emanuel vs. Garry McCarthy

Poll source	Date(s) administered	Sample size	Margin of error	Rahm Emanuel	Garry McCarthy	Undecided
Public Policy Polling	August 2018	722		38%	37%	25%

Rahm Emanuel vs. Paul Vallas

Poll source	Date(s) administered	Sample size	Margin of error	Rahm Emanuel	Paul Vallas	Undecided
Public Policy Polling	August 2018	722		33%	39%	28%
Global Strategy Group	July 22–29, 2018	600	±4%	44%	37%	–

=== Other polling ===
If Rahm Emanuel were running for re-election, would you vote for him?

Poll source	Date(s) administered	Sample size	Margin of error	Yes	No	Undecided
Temkin/Harris with Normington, Petts & Associates	March 18–20, 2019	500	±4.4%	25%	63%	12%

== Results ==
=== First round ===
2019 Chicago mayoral election results (first round) Non-partisan election
Candidate	Votes	%
Lori Lightfoot	97,667	17.54
Toni Preckwinkle	89,343	16.04
William M. Daley	82,294	14.78
Willie L. Wilson	59,072	10.61
Susana A. Mendoza	50,373	9.05
Amara Enyia	44,589	8.01
Jerry Joyce	40,099	7.20
Gery Chico	34,521	6.20
Paul Vallas	30,236	5.43
Garry McCarthy	14,784	2.65
La Shawn K. Ford	5,606	1.01
Robert "Bob" Fioretti	4,302	0.77
John Kenneth Kozlar	2,349	0.42
Neal Sales-Griffin	1,523	0.27
Roger L. Washington write-in	47	0.01
Tamara McCullough AKA Tamar Manasseh write-in	11	0.00
Catherine Brown D'Tycoon write-in	7	0.00
Stephen Hodge write-in	7	0.00
Ja'Mal Green write-in	6	0.00
Daniel Fein write-in	3	0.00
Ryan Friedman write-in	2	0.00
Richard Benedict Mayers write-in	2	0.00
Robert A. Palmer write-in	1	0.00
Total votes	556,844	

==== Results by ward ====
First round results by ward

Seven candidates each had pluralities in at least one of the city's fifty wards.

- Wilson had pluralities in thirteen wards (Wards 6, 7, 9, 16, 17, 18, 20, 21, 24, 28, 29, 34, 37)
- Lightfoot had pluralities in eleven wards (Wards 1, 25, 32, 33, 35, 40, 44, 46, 47, 48, 49)
- Daley had pluralities in eight wards (Wards 2, 11, 38, 39, 42, 43, 45, 50)
- Mendoza had pluralities in seven wards (Wards 12, 14, 15, 22, 30, 31, 36)
- Preckwinkle had pluralities in six wards (Wards 3, 4, 5, 8, 26, 27)
- Joyce had pluralities in four wards (Wards 13, 19, 23, 41)
- Chico had a plurality in a single ward (Ward 10)

Of the city's eighteen wards that are predominantly black, Wilson carried a plurality of the vote in thirteen (Wards 6, 7, 9, 16, 17, 18, 20, 21, 24, 28, 29, 34, and 37) with Preckwinkle carrying a plurality of the vote in the remaining five (Wards 3, 4, 5, 8, and 27). In the combined vote of the city's predominately black wards, Wilson placed first, Preckwinkle placed second, Lightfoot placed third, Daley placed fourth, and Enyia placed fifth.

Chico Daley Joyce Lightfoot Mendoza Preckwinkle Wilson

Results by ward
Ward	Chico		Daley		Enyia		Fioretti		Ford		Joyce		Kozlar		Lightfoot		McCarthy		Mendoza		Preckwinkle		Sales-Griffin		Vallas		Wilson		Total votes	Turnout %
Ward	Votes	%	Votes	%	Votes	%	Votes	%	Votes	%	Votes	%	Votes	%	Votes	%	Votes	%	Votes	%	Votes	%	Votes	%	Votes	%	Votes	%	Total votes	Turnout %
1	637	5.12%	1,617	13.01%	1,749	14.07%	101	0.81%	78	0.63%	427	3.43%	84	0.68%	3,198	25.73%	229	1.84%	1,338	10.76%	2,020	16.25%	46	0.37%	556	4.47%	351	2.82%	12,431	33.72%
2	612	4.47%	3,871	28.27%	875	6.39%	90	0.66%	64	0.47%	522	3.81%	76	0.55%	3,088	22.55%	408	2.98%	1,014	7.40%	1,630	11.90%	58	0.42%	1,025	7.49%	361	2.64%	13,694	34.24%
3	492	3.64%	1,808	13.36%	1,290	9.53%	166	1.23%	142	1.05%	396	2.93%	44	0.33%	2,457	18.16%	177	1.31%	668	4.94%	3,097	22.88%	45	0.33%	530	3.92%	2,221	16.41%	13,533	35.90%
4	361	2.51%	1,331	9.27%	1,600	11.14%	154	1.07%	180	1.25%	258	1.80%	34	0.24%	2,865	19.95%	130	0.91%	592	4.12%	4,520	31.47%	55	0.38%	415	2.89%	1,867	13.00%	14,362	39.82%
5	247	1.85%	1,094	8.19%	1,514	11.33%	54	0.40%	144	1.08%	195	1.46%	14	0.10%	2,804	20.99%	81	0.61%	414	3.10%	4,599	34.43%	51	0.38%	346	2.59%	1,802	13.49%	13,359	42.04%
6	257	2.48%	833	8.04%	965	9.31%	59	0.57%	200	1.93%	215	2.07%	8	0.08%	1,522	14.69%	74	0.71%	278	2.68%	2,611	25.20%	27	0.26%	218	2.10%	3,095	29.87%	10,362	31.70%
7	350	3.39%	904	8.76%	1,076	10.42%	59	0.57%	152	1.47%	193	1.87%	13	0.13%	1,492	14.45%	87	0.84%	448	4.34%	2,505	24.26%	43	0.42%	255	2.47%	2,748	26.62%	10,325	32.14%
8	368	2.67%	1,280	9.28%	1,457	10.57%	75	0.54%	245	1.78%	294	2.13%	14	0.10%	2,035	14.76%	86	0.62%	434	3.15%	3,639	26.39%	51	0.37%	307	2.23%	3,504	25.41%	13,789	36.80%
9	369	3.19%	1,042	9.01%	1,078	9.32%	85	0.74%	157	1.36%	256	2.21%	11	0.10%	1,641	14.19%	87	0.75%	352	3.04%	2,638	22.82%	40	0.35%	296	2.56%	3,510	30.36%	11,562	31.86%
10	1,952	23.07%	1,073	12.68%	346	4.09%	73	0.86%	28	0.33%	644	7.61%	31	0.37%	537	6.35%	519	6.13%	1,561	18.45%	583	6.89%	14	0.17%	544	6.43%	556	6.57%	8,461	31.47%
11	726	6.88%	3,808	36.10%	681	6.46%	65	0.62%	32	0.30%	998	9.46%	275	2.61%	1,210	11.47%	541	5.13%	660	6.26%	815	7.73%	15	0.14%	483	4.58%	239	2.27%	10,548	37.27%
12	887	15.02%	983	16.64%	466	7.89%	34	0.58%	26	0.44%	444	7.52%	43	0.73%	481	8.14%	231	3.91%	1,450	24.55%	498	8.43%	19	0.32%	191	3.23%	154	2.61%	5,907	28.97%
13	1,866	14.86%	2,078	16.54%	349	2.78%	114	0.91%	20	0.16%	2,634	20.97%	52	0.41%	609	4.85%	757	6.03%	2,481	19.75%	511	4.07%	17	0.14%	786	6.26%	287	2.28%	12,561	44.30%
14	1,271	17.46%	1,148	15.77%	358	4.92%	65	0.89%	7	0.10%	1,007	13.83%	34	0.47%	372	5.11%	389	5.34%	1,799	24.71%	352	4.84%	10	0.14%	336	4.62%	131	1.80%	7,279	34.19%
15	746	14.56%	589	11.49%	361	7.04%	25	0.49%	40	0.78%	278	5.42%	19	0.37%	342	6.67%	106	2.07%	1,122	21.89%	570	11.12%	13	0.25%	141	2.75%	773	15.08%	5,125	26.99%
16	268	4.72%	583	10.27%	421	7.42%	24	0.42%	93	1.64%	123	2.17%	17	0.30%	573	10.10%	57	1.00%	495	8.72%	1,098	19.35%	9	0.16%	119	2.10%	1,794	31.62%	5,674	22.80%
17	288	3.57%	742	9.20%	682	8.46%	34	0.42%	125	1.55%	170	2.11%	9	0.11%	946	11.73%	64	0.79%	372	4.61%	1,757	21.79%	22	0.27%	196	2.43%	2,656	32.94%	8,063	27.12%
18	731	6.02%	1,324	10.91%	954	7.86%	58	0.48%	171	1.41%	900	7.42%	22	0.18%	1,559	12.85%	257	2.12%	864	7.12%	2,227	18.35%	30	0.25%	573	4.72%	2,466	20.32%	12,136	35.84%
19	1,050	4.92%	2,180	10.21%	753	3.53%	80	0.37%	80	0.37%	9,296	43.55%	52	0.24%	1,809	8.48%	396	1.86%	791	3.71%	1,724	8.08%	32	0.15%	2,023	9.48%	1,078	5.05%	21,344	56.99%
20	217	2.83%	568	7.40%	836	10.90%	40	0.52%	135	1.76%	139	1.81%	11	0.14%	1,122	14.63%	51	0.66%	352	4.59%	1,780	23.20%	19	0.25%	154	2.01%	2,247	29.29%	7,671	29.59%
21	360	2.86%	1,045	8.29%	1,186	9.41%	67	0.53%	211	1.67%	295	2.34%	11	0.09%	1,713	13.59%	78	0.62%	407	3.23%	3,049	24.19%	46	0.37%	293	2.33%	3,841	30.48%	12,602	33.48%
22	683	13.80%	634	12.81%	362	7.31%	24	0.48%	47	0.95%	373	7.53%	21	0.42%	327	6.60%	141	2.85%	1,292	26.10%	583	11.78%	7	0.14%	112	2.26%	345	6.97%	4,951	24.38%
23	1,303	14.29%	1,489	16.33%	281	3.08%	65	0.71%	19	0.21%	2,031	22.27%	60	0.66%	499	5.47%	547	6.00%	1,574	17.26%	405	4.44%	10	0.11%	609	6.68%	228	2.50%	9,120	35.35%
24	152	2.34%	535	8.23%	558	8.58%	48	0.74%	219	3.37%	114	1.75%	6	0.09%	739	11.36%	58	0.89%	268	4.12%	1,378	21.19%	12	0.18%	100	1.54%	2,316	35.61%	6,503	24.19%
25	1,026	10.43%	1,353	13.75%	1,223	12.43%	94	0.96%	56	0.57%	525	5.34%	64	0.65%	1,613	16.39%	217	2.21%	1,436	14.59%	1,376	13.98%	34	0.35%	410	4.17%	413	4.20%	9,840	33.15%
26	732	8.22%	1,128	12.67%	1,098	12.33%	51	0.57%	65	0.73%	310	3.48%	24	0.27%	1,551	17.42%	217	2.44%	1,275	14.32%	1,594	17.91%	37	0.42%	322	3.62%	498	5.59%	8,902	30.55%
27	404	3.84%	1,545	14.69%	916	8.71%	211	2.01%	189	1.80%	288	2.74%	43	0.41%	1,772	16.85%	165	1.57%	651	6.19%	2,012	19.13%	41	0.39%	376	3.57%	1,905	18.11%	10,518	28.12%
28	301	3.59%	825	9.83%	711	8.47%	120	1.43%	306	3.65%	206	2.45%	21	0.25%	1,231	14.67%	93	1.11%	377	4.49%	1,463	17.43%	24	0.29%	265	3.16%	2,449	29.18%	8,392	25.38%
29	458	4.21%	1,253	11.52%	787	7.23%	111	1.02%	587	5.40%	402	3.70%	30	0.28%	1,447	13.30%	217	1.99%	688	6.32%	1,911	17.57%	9	0.08%	415	3.81%	2,564	23.57%	10,879	30.11%
30	744	9.91%	1,064	14.17%	610	8.12%	76	1.01%	27	0.36%	400	5.33%	60	0.80%	1,154	15.37%	341	4.54%	1,545	20.57%	885	11.78%	10	0.13%	357	4.75%	237	3.16%	7,510	29.20%
31	725	11.15%	1,033	15.88%	470	7.23%	54	0.83%	23	0.35%	324	4.98%	37	0.57%	820	12.61%	285	4.38%	1,482	22.78%	708	10.88%	13	0.20%	267	4.10%	264	4.06%	6,505	26.16%
32	615	4.59%	2,449	18.26%	1,398	10.43%	100	0.75%	69	0.51%	522	3.89%	80	0.60%	3,947	29.43%	268	2.00%	1,063	7.93%	1,822	13.59%	60	0.45%	812	6.06%	205	1.53%	13,410	35.99%
33	678	6.15%	1,407	12.77%	1,215	11.03%	82	0.74%	65	0.59%	443	4.02%	42	0.38%	2,768	25.13%	293	2.66%	1,463	13.28%	1,774	16.10%	37	0.34%	529	4.80%	220	2.00%	11,016	39.90%
34	330	2.79%	1,110	9.39%	1,053	8.91%	77	0.65%	198	1.67%	331	2.80%	6	0.05%	1,623	13.73%	97	0.82%	388	3.28%	2,716	22.97%	28	0.24%	278	2.35%	3,587	30.34%	11,822	31.91%
35	538	6.71%	881	10.99%	1,069	13.34%	60	0.75%	54	0.67%	276	3.44%	31	0.39%	1,788	22.31%	195	2.43%	1,142	14.25%	1,461	18.23%	23	0.29%	294	3.67%	201	2.51%	8,013	30.91%
36	672	11.53%	947	16.25%	258	4.43%	48	0.82%	25	0.43%	492	8.44%	54	0.93%	565	9.70%	277	4.75%	1,283	22.02%	508	8.72%	5	0.09%	421	7.23%	271	4.65%	5,826	23.75%
37	196	2.53%	758	9.77%	578	7.45%	53	0.68%	613	7.90%	132	1.70%	12	0.15%	843	10.87%	71	0.92%	372	4.80%	1,416	18.25%	17	0.22%	162	2.09%	2,535	32.68%	7,758	24.50%
38	1,151	10.46%	1,901	17.27%	320	2.91%	130	1.18%	26	0.24%	1,576	14.32%	74	0.67%	1,225	11.13%	724	6.58%	1,510	13.72%	806	7.32%	18	0.16%	1,175	10.68%	370	3.36%	11,006	33.01%
39	1,046	7.81%	2,548	19.03%	637	4.76%	114	0.85%	32	0.24%	1,243	9.28%	60	0.45%	2,387	17.83%	585	4.37%	1,288	9.62%	1,527	11.40%	37	0.28%	1,476	11.02%	411	3.07%	13,391	40.62%
40	688	5.11%	1,626	12.07%	1,340	9.94%	74	0.55%	64	0.47%	692	5.14%	49	0.36%	4,027	29.88%	311	2.31%	1,154	8.56%	2,274	16.88%	30	0.22%	864	6.41%	282	2.09%	13,475	41.96%
41	1,633	9.11%	3,393	18.93%	298	1.66%	209	1.17%	17	0.09%	3,653	20.38%	74	0.41%	1,594	8.89%	1,206	6.73%	1,546	8.63%	911	5.08%	31	0.17%	2,747	15.33%	612	3.41%	17,924	48.18%
42	707	5.16%	4,412	32.23%	566	4.13%	97	0.71%	52	0.38%	551	4.02%	85	0.62%	2,868	20.95%	565	4.13%	937	6.84%	1,502	10.97%	57	0.42%	987	7.21%	304	2.22%	13,690	31.42%
43	652	4.51%	4,489	31.02%	743	5.13%	90	0.62%	49	0.34%	530	3.66%	73	0.50%	3,365	23.25%	342	2.36%	995	6.88%	1,659	11.46%	48	0.33%	1,133	7.83%	304	2.10%	14,472	40.10%
44	709	4.62%	3,187	20.76%	1,171	7.63%	100	0.65%	70	0.46%	454	2.96%	80	0.52%	4,453	29.01%	349	2.27%	1,391	9.06%	2,132	13.89%	59	0.38%	961	6.26%	236	1.54%	15,352	40.26%
45	1,266	8.46%	2,402	16.05%	624	4.17%	185	1.24%	46	0.31%	1,870	12.50%	101	0.68%	2,313	15.46%	942	6.30%	1,624	10.85%	1,455	9.72%	20	0.13%	1,529	10.22%	585	3.91%	14,962	42.62%
46	610	4.32%	2,039	14.43%	1,503	10.64%	96	0.68%	87	0.62%	392	2.77%	73	0.52%	4,163	29.46%	289	2.05%	1,254	8.87%	2,426	17.17%	45	0.32%	674	4.77%	480	3.40%	14,131	40.78%
47	820	4.18%	2,865	14.60%	1,991	10.15%	120	0.61%	87	0.44%	736	3.75%	97	0.49%	6,216	31.68%	373	1.90%	1,624	8.28%	3,159	16.10%	49	0.25%	1,190	6.07%	293	1.49%	19,620	49.55%
48	571	3.71%	1,886	12.27%	1,491	9.70%	84	0.55%	75	0.49%	637	4.14%	52	0.34%	5,056	32.89%	297	1.93%	1,037	6.75%	3,046	19.81%	36	0.23%	675	4.39%	430	2.80%	15,373	44.97%
49	469	3.77%	1,147	9.23%	1,756	14.13%	85	0.68%	78	0.63%	384	3.09%	37	0.30%	3,328	26.79%	177	1.42%	1,067	8.59%	2,918	23.49%	44	0.35%	483	3.89%	451	3.63%	12,424	42.61%
50	587	6.39%	2,087	22.72%	565	6.15%	122	1.33%	31	0.34%	528	5.75%	29	0.32%	1,610	17.53%	337	3.67%	755	8.22%	1,293	14.08%	20	0.22%	826	8.99%	395	4.30%	9,185	32.85%

=== Runoff ===
2019 Chicago mayoral election results (runoff)
Candidate	Votes	%
Lori Lightfoot	386,039	73.70%
Toni Preckwinkle	137,765	26.30%
Total votes	523,804	

==== Results by ward ====
Results by ward: Lightfoot: 54–59%; 59–64%; 64–69%; 69–74%; 74–79%; 79–84%; 84–88%

Lightfoot won all fifty of the city's wards. Additionally, Lightfoot won 2,049 of the city's 2,069 voting precincts (all but twenty), a victory for Lightfoot in more than 99.03% of precincts.

The only neighborhood to back Preckwinkle over Lightfoot was Preckwinkle's home neighborhood of Hyde Park. Preckwinkle's strongest support was in Hyde Park and its surrounding area, with Preckwinkle only managing to outperform Lightfoot in a single precinct that was located away from that part of the city.

Results by ward
Ward	Lightfoot		Preckwinkle		Total votes	Turnout %
Ward	Votes	%	Votes	%	Total votes	Turnout %
1	7,762	71.42%	3,106	28.58%	10,868	29.20%
2	10,430	80.89%	2,464	19.11%	12,894	32.09%
3	9,284	70.01%	3,977	29.99%	13,261	34.94%
4	8,663	59.72%	5,842	40.28%	14,505	39.94%
5	7,522	54.38%	6,311	45.62%	13,833	43.14%
6	7,549	66.88%	3,739	33.12%	11,288	34.31%
7	7,099	67.56%	3,409	32.44%	10,508	32.48%
8	9,327	65.99%	4,806	34.01%	14,133	37.56%
9	8,251	69.67%	3,592	30.33%	11,843	32.51%
10	5,281	81.67%	1,185	18.33%	6,466	23.93%
11	6,483	74.31%	2,241	25.69%	8,724	30.61%
12	3,061	74.35%	1,056	25.65%	4,117	20.05%
13	7,201	84.95%	1,276	15.05%	8,477	29.70%
14	3,853	81.87%	853	18.13%	4,706	21.90%
15	3,974	74.32%	1,373	25.68%	5,347	27.98%
16	4,085	69.77%	1,770	30.23%	5,855	23.39%
17	5,736	69.59%	2,507	30.41%	8,243	27.61%
18	8,439	73.38%	3,061	26.62%	11,500	33.82%
19	15,931	84.33%	2,961	15.67%	18,892	50.16%
20	5,110	65.81%	2,655	34.19%	7,765	20.56%
21	9,416	68.97%	4,237	31.03%	13,653	36.15%
22	2,820	75.20%	930	24.80%	3,750	18.40%
23	5,757	83.56%	1,133	16.44%	6,890	26.59%
24	4,576	69.49%	2,009	30.51%	6,585	24.21%
25	6,883	71.81%	2,702	28.19%	9,585	32.01%
26	4,867	66.22%	2,483	33.78%	7,350	25.05%
27	7,414	70.78%	3,061	29.22%	10,475	27.71%
28	6,004	71.81%	2,357	28.19%	8,361	25.04%
29	8,169	73.40%	2,961	26.60%	11,130	30.71%
30	5,790	73.67%	2,069	26.33%	7,859	30.33%
31	4,866	73.28%	1,774	26.72%	6,640	26.55%
32	10,027	78.91%	2,680	21.09%	12,707	33.87%
33	8,127	70.93%	3,330	29.07%	11,457	41.16%
34	8,304	68.78%	3,770	31.22%	12,074	32.41%
35	4,632	66.51%	2,332	33.49%	6,964	26.72%
36	4,557	81.96%	1,003	18.04%	5,560	22.51%
37	5,686	72.72%	2,133	27.28%	7,819	24.60%
38	8,498	83.87%	1,634	16.13%	10,132	30.25%
39	10,523	79.00%	2,798	21.00%	13,321	40.23%
40	9,954	71.55%	3,958	28.45%	13,912	43.05%
41	13,026	87.53%	1,856	12.47%	14,882	39.79%
42	11,086	84.32%	2,061	15.68%	13,147	29.95%
43	11,756	83.58%	2,309	16.42%	14,065	38.59%
44	10,904	80.47%	2,646	19.53%	13,550	35.20%
45	10,041	81.50%	2,279	18.50%	12,320	34.90%
46	10,400	73.06%	3,835	26.94%	14,235	40.69%
47	14,302	74.78%	4,824	25.22%	19,126	47.97%
48	10,452	70.27%	4,421	29.73%	14,873	43.26%
49	6,584	63.32%	3,814	36.68%	10,398	35.00%
50	5,577	71.88%	2,182	28.12%	7,759	27.57%

== Voter turnout ==
=== First round ===
Turnout in the first round of the election was 35.20%. The low turnout was attributed to poor youth turnout and a drop off in voter turnout from the 2018 midterms.

The 35.32% turnout was higher than that of the first round of the 2015 election, but was lower than that of the 2015 runoff. Turnout was lower than in the previous open race in 2011.

Turnout was reported to be lowest among the millennial age demographic, with a lower turnout among those under 35 than the previous lowest under-35 turnout in 2007.

=== Runoff ===
Runoff turnout was 32.89%.

== Portrayal in media ==
The Steve James documentary series City So Real, which premiered at the 2020 Sundance Film Festival and was later televised on National Geographic on October 28, 2020, centers on the mayoral election.

== Timeline ==
=== 2017 ===
- June: The organization Take Charge Chicago (led by former Illinois Governor Pat Quinn) begins circulating petitions to place a referendum on the November 2018 ballot which, if approved by voters, would have prohibited Chicago mayors from serving more than two consecutive terms. If approved by voters, this would have prevented incumbent mayor Rahm Emanuel from being eligible for re-election
- October 19: Rahm Emanuel declares his intention to seek re-election
- November 17: Troy LaRiviere announces candidacy

=== 2018 ===
March

- March 21: Garry McCarthy announces candidacy
- March 29: Willie Wilson announces candidacy

April

- April 19: Dorothy A. Brown Cook announces candidacy
- April 20: Ja'Mal Green announces candidacy
- April 22: Neal Sáles-Griffin announces candidacy

May

- May 2: Paul Vallas announces candidacy
- May 8: John Kozlar announces candidacy
- May 10: Lori Lightfoot announces candidacy

August

- August 6: Take Charge Chicago formally submits to the Chicago Board of Election its petition for a term-limits referendum question to be included on the November 2018 ballot
- August 24: Trudy Leong announces candidacy
- August 29: Amara Enyia and Jerry Joyce announce candidacies
- August 31: Chicago Board of Elections rules that the term-limits referendum question petitioned by Take Charge Chicago had collected a sufficient number of valid signatures to preliminary qualify for inclusion on the November 2018 ballot

September

- September 4: Rahm Emanuel withdraws
- September 11: Antoine Members and Charles Minor announce candidacies
- September 12: Chicago Board of Elections rules that the term-limits referendum question petitioned by Take Charge Chicago is ineligible for inclusion on the November 2018 ballot due to improper phrasing
- September 17: William M. Daley announces candidacy
- September 18: Gery Chico and William J. Kelly announce candidacies
- September 20: Toni Preckwinkle announces candidacy
- September 27: LaShawn Ford announces candidacy

November

- November 13: Troy LaRiviere withdraws
- November 14: Susana Mendoza announces candidacy
- November 19: First day of petition filing
  - Catherine Brown D'Tycoon, Jerry Joyce, Toni Preckwinkle, and Paul Vallas file petitions
- November 23: Conrien Hykes Clark files petition
- November 26: Final day of petition filing
  - Dorothy A. Brown Cook, Gery Chico, William M. Daley, Amara Enyia, Robert Fioretti, La Shawn K. Ford, Ja'Mal Green, John Kozlar, Lori Lightfoot, Sandra L. Mallory, Richard Mayers, Garry McCarthy, Susana Mendoza, Neal Sáles-Griffin, Roger L. Washington submit petitions
  - William J. Kelly withdraws
- November 27: William "Dock" Walls withdraws

December

- December 3: Deadline for challenges to be filed
  - Chico, Enyia, Fioretti, Joyce, Kozlar, Mallory, Preckwinkle, Vallas, and Wilson were not challenged, and were therefore certified as candidates and granted ballot status
  - Challenges were filed against the petitions of Brown Cook, Brown D'Tycoon, Daley, Ford, Green, Hykes Clark, Lightfoot, Mayers, McCarthy, Mendoza, Sáles-Griffin, and Washington.
- December 20: Daley and McCarthy are both officially granted ballot status
- December 27: Deadline to declare intent to run as a write-in candidates
  - Mendoza is officially granted ballot status
  - The petitions of Hykes Clark, Mallory, and Mayers are rejected, effectively removing these candidates' names from the ballot
  - Ja'Mal Green files to withdraw his name from the ballot and instead run as a write-in
- December 31: Ja'Mal Green withdraws

=== 2019 ===
January

- January 2:
  - Lightfoot is officially granted ballot status
  - The petitions of Brown D'Tycoon and Washington are rejected, effectively removing their names from the ballot
- January 12: Ford is officially granted ballot status
- January 22:
  - Sáles-Griffin is officially granted ballot status
  - The petition of Brown Cook is rejected, effectively removing her name from the ballot
- January 29: Early voting begins for first round of election

February

- February 26: First round of election is held

March

- March 15: Early voting begins for the runoff election

April

- April 2: Runoff election is held
