= Dorothy Brown (politician) =

American politician

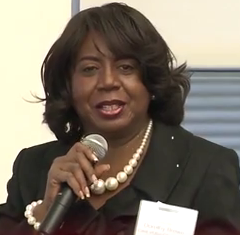
- Brown in 2015

Clerk of the Circuit Court of Cook County
- In office December 1, 2000 – December 1, 2020
- Preceded by: Aurelia Pucinski
- Succeeded by: Iris Martinez

Village Administrator of Dolton, Illinois
- In office October 2021 – December 2021
- Appointed by: Tiffany Henyard
- Succeeded by: Keith Freeman

Personal details
- Born: Dorothy Ann Brown; September 4, 1953 (age 73) Minden, Louisiana, U.S.
- Party: Democratic
- Spouse: Benton Cook (m. 2009)
- Children: 1
- Education: Southern University (BS); DePaul University (MBA); Illinois Institute of Technology (JD)

Dorothy Ann Rabb Brown Cook (born September 4, 1953) is an American lawyer and politician affiliated with the Democratic Party who served as the clerk of the Circuit Court of Cook County from 2000 through 2020.

Brown's tenure was criticized for inefficiency in the clerk's office and a failure to adequately update the office's operations with digital systems. She was also criticized for sizable use of political patronage. Her tenure was plagued by many scandals regarding her ethics. She and numerous associates have been the subjects of criminal investigations into alleged involvement in corruption schemes.

Brown was an unsuccessful candidate for mayor of Chicago in the 2007 and 2019 elections, an unsuccessful candidate for Chicago city clerk in 1999, and an unsuccessful candidate for president of the Cook County Board of Commissioners in 2010. After her tenure as clerk of courts ended, Brown spent several months as the village administrator of Dolton, Illinois.

== Early life, family, and education ==
Brown grew up in Minden, Louisiana, one of eight children. Her father worked in the laundry room of the Louisiana Army Ammunitions Plant near Minden. He also owned a cotton farm in Athens, Louisiana, where Brown and her seven siblings helped him pick and chop cotton. Brown's mother worked as a cook and a domestic.

At Webster High School, Brown was captain of the girl's varsity basketball team, and graduated in the top ten percent of her class. Brown studied at Southern University in Baton Rouge, Louisiana and graduated magna cum laude. In 1977, Brown received her license as a Certified Public Accountant (CPA). In 1981, she received her Master of Business Administration (MBA) with honors from DePaul University in Chicago. In 1996, Brown received her J.D. degree with honors from Chicago-Kent College of Law.

== Early career ==
Brown worked for Arthur Andersen and Commonwealth Edison as a certified public accountant. She also helped to start a minority public accounting firm. From 1991 to 2000, Brown worked as the general auditor for the Chicago Transit Authority (CTA).

Brown unsuccessfully ran for City treasurer of Chicago in 1999, losing to incumbent Miriam Santos by a 2.8% margin.

== Clerk of the Circuit Court of Cook County (2000–2020) ==
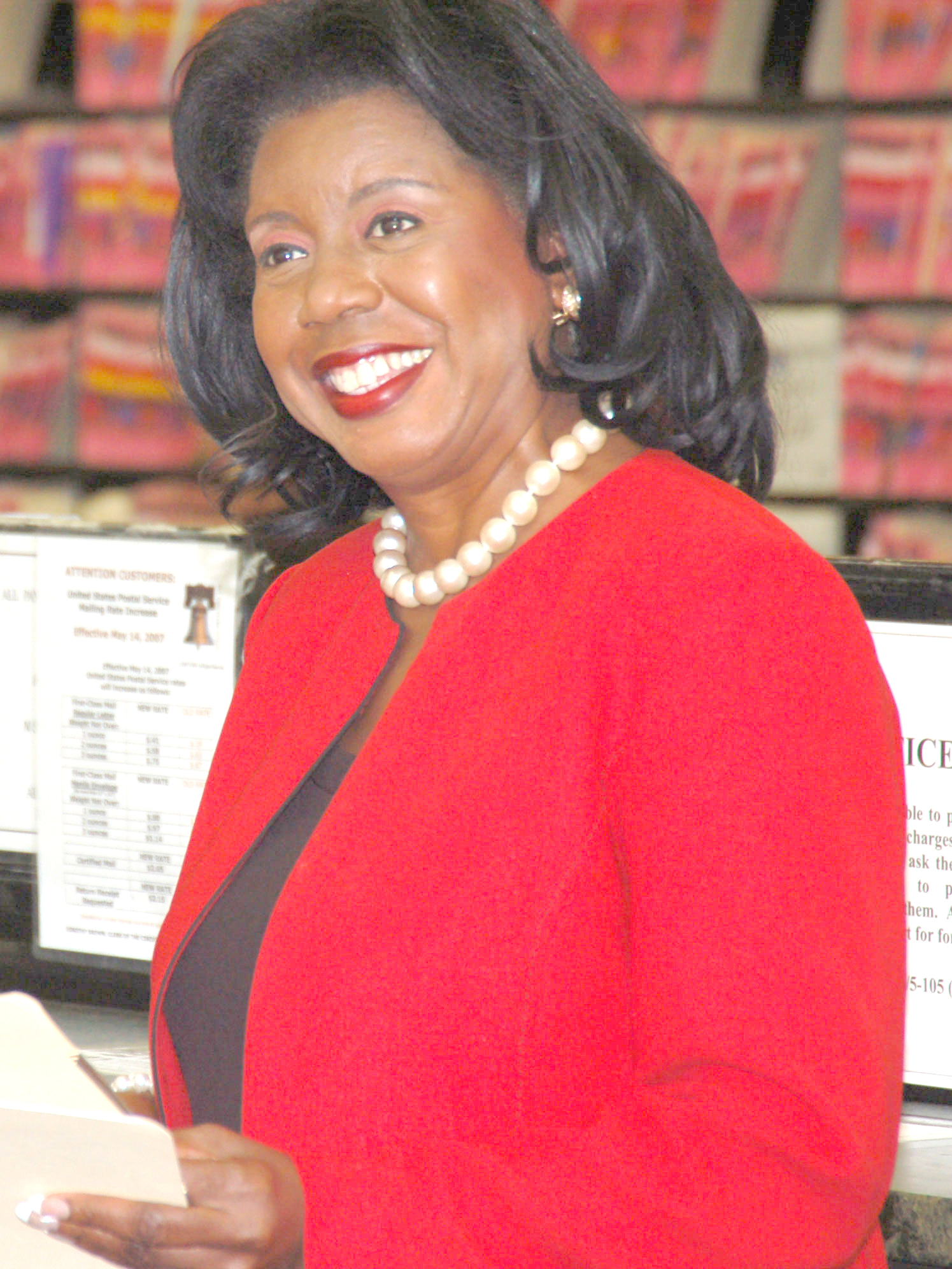
Brown in 2008

Cook County voters elected Brown as the Clerk of the Circuit Court in 2000, and reelected her four additional times. Brown served for 20 years and retired in 2020. As the official keeper of records for all judicial matters brought into one of the largest unified court systems in the world, Brown was responsible for managing an annual operating budget of more than $100 million and had a workforce of over 1,800 employees.

While Brown was initially seen as a reform-minded politician when she was elected, by 2014, Natasha Korecki of the Chicago Sun-Times wrote that over the course of her tenure Brown had come to be, "increasingly viewed as an entrenched politician who for years [has] signed off on dubious practices in her office."

=== Elections ===
In 2012, during Brown's third reelection campaign, the editorial board of the Chicago Tribune declined to endorse any candidate, citing "Brown's years of failed assurances to modernize the obsolete, paper-choked office she heads."

In August 2015, the slating committee of the Cook County Democratic Party narrowly voted to endorse Brown for reelection to a fifth term in the March 2016 primary elections. In early October 2015, the Federal Bureau of Investigation executed a search warrant at Brown's home and seized her County-issued cell phone. On October 23, 2015 the Cook County Democratic Party withdrew its endorsement of Brown and endorsed challenger Michelle A. Harris.

Both the Chicago Sun-Times and Chicago Tribune declined to endorse Brown or her opponent in the 2016 campaign. Brown went on to win both the Democratic primary and the general election, being reelected for a fifth term.

In August 2019, Brown announced that she would not seek reelection to a sixth term in 2020.

In 2018, political consultant Delmarie Cobb described Brown's dedicated political supporters as being churchgoers and a grassroot base. In 2024, journalist Gregory Pratt recalled that Brown received loyal support from "'the church ladies' –older Black women voters who worship every Sunday and gave her their backing." Pratt also observed that Brown had benefited from the lack of interest from "big-hitter" politicians in seeking the office of circuit court clerk.

=== Pursuits of other offices during tenure ===
Brown unsuccessfully ran mayor of Chicago in 2007. She was the only established political figure challenging incumbent mayor Richard M. Daley. Brown failed to attract strong enough support from the African American community to mount a true challenge to Daley, and lagged severely behind Daley in terms of campaign funds. She ultimately finished in second place out of three candidates, with 20.12% of the vote, 51 points behind Daley.

Brown ran for president of the Cook County Board of Commissioners in 2010. At one point, she led the Democratic field in at Chicago Tribune poll. However, she ultimately lost the Democratic primary to Toni Preckwinkle, placing third out of four candidates, behind Preckwinkle and Terrence J. O'Brien. Brown received 14.45% of the vote.

Despite the scandals she had faced, Brown attempted to run for mayor of Chicago in 2019, but was removed from the ballot for failing to complete the required paperwork. Following her removal from the ballot, Brown endorsed Amara Enyia for mayor. However, Enyia failed to qualify for the runoff election, which was won by Lori Lightfoot.

=== Patronage ===
Brown was characterized as running an office full of patronage hires. In 2014 the Chicago Sun-Times described the Clerk's office as "a 2,300-employee office, one of the last true bastions of political patronage in Illinois".

Beginning in August 2018, a federally-ordered monitor was appointed under to audit the hiring and employment practices of Brown's office in an effort to monitor the office's compliance with the Shakman Decrees. This federal oversight of the office's hiring and employment practices would not cease until November 2022, during the tenure of Brown's successor.

In 2015, an employee of Brown's office testified that the "going rate" for a job in Brown's office was $10,000.

=== Modernization efforts and shortcomings ===
When she first campaigned for the office in 2000, Brown promised that she would make sure that the clerk's office kept pace with new technology. However, Brown was seen as falling significantly short of this promise in her tenure. In 2014, Natasha Korecki of the Chicago Sun-Times described Brown as, "synonymous with questionable ethics and woefully outdated technology." In 2017, the editorial board of the Chicago Tribune characterized Brown as leading a, "patronage-packed office...stuck in a land that time forgot," with a, "well-earned reputation as a fortress of inefficiency." In 2024, journalist Gregory Pratt recalled,

As Cook County circuit court clerk, Brown controlled key operations for the court system, one of the most byzantine and failed structures of government in the Chicago area. Decades after computers became widespread, its digital system barely worked, and it was still using carbon paper.

Projects and services developed under Brown's leadership include: Two Electronic filing (e-filing), a Clerk of the Circuit Court mobile app: "Court Clerk Mobile Connect," an Electronic Tickets (eTickets) system, Mortgage Surplus Search, SmartForms (Online Order of Protection service), Smart Kiosks (court information terminals), and IDMS (Imaging Document Management System).

Brown was criticized by advocacy groups who alleged a failure to sufficiently modernize the court system. The court's case management system had been characterized as "archaic". In 2012, the editorial board of the Chicago Tribune criticized Brown for, "years of failed assurances to modernize the obsolete, paper-choked office she heads."

Brown numerous times failed to meet deadlines for the modernization of the court's filing system. In late-2017, Brown announced that an e-filing system that the Illinois Supreme Court had mandated be created for lawsuits and other civil cases was ready to be launched. However, a month after this, Brown called-off the launch and requested that the court allow a delay. The eventual July 2018 rollout of the electronic filing for civil cases was plagued by confusion and disorder.

A partial system update that digitized criminal courts filing was first phased-in in November 2019, but proved to be problematic. This update led to the records it made available often being incomplete and taking longer to be updated. This proved so problematic that the court itself in October 2020 ordered that Brown halt its implementation.

=== Failure to provide records and notices in timely fashion ===
For much of her tenure, Brown was criticized for failing to provide stored records that had been requested in a timely fashion.

In May 2018, The Chicago Reader detailed how the removal of documents case files to warehouses as part of the slow-moving effort to digitize documents had placed more 600 appeals cases in flux due to the unavailability of needed documents. At this time, the Illinois Appellate Defender's Office called delays in obtaining records from the Brown's office was an "ongoing problem".

In June 2020, Legal Aid Chicago filed a lawsuit accusing Brown's office of, during the COVID-19 pandemic, failing to provide domestic violence and sexual assault survivors with copies of their orders of protection immediately after they had been granted, which the office had a statutory duty to do. The lawsuit by Legal Aid Chicago further accused Brown's office of failing to transmit such orders to the Cook County Sheriff's Office in a timely fashion so that they could be entered into that office's Law Enforcement Agency Data System. The lawsuit argued that these alleged failures on the part of Brown's office endangered survivors of domestic violence and sexual assault.

Also during the pandemic, Brown received criticism for failure to mail out the notices in a timely fashion to tell individuals that their court appearances would be conducted virtually, with some notices having been mailed out after the date of the court appearances had already passed. When questioned by WGN-TV on this, Brown alleged that "unconscious racism" was at the root of both that story, and other negative stories reported on her during her tenure.

=== COVID-19 pandemic ===
Amid the COVID-19 pandemic, Brown received criticism from court clerks and the clerks' union, who argued she was not doing enough to protect them and the public amid the pandemic. Some clerks walked off the job. Brown faced lawsuits for her alleged failure to send out notices of virtual hearings in a timely fashion, and for failing to produce documents in a required timely fashion.

In November 2020, Brown was caught by WGN-TV holding a retirement party that appeared to possibly violate the city and state's 50-person limit on gatherings amid the pandemic.

=== Political fundraising controversies ===
In 2024, the editorial board of the Chicago Tribune recollected,

Given the office's lack of glamour and given our county's history, it's no surprise that the post [of Cook County clerk of courts] has been a particularly fertile source of corruption. Dorothy Brown, who held the job for two decades, was Exhibit A. Under Brown, the office was rife with improper fundraising for her campaigns.

In 2012, the Chicago Tribune published a report documenting in excess of $315,000 of political donations which Brown had accepted from employees of her office and at least $75,000 which she had accepted from relatives of employees. After winning election to a fourth term several months later, Brown promised to stop accepting campaign contributions from her employees.

In May 2006, Brown chaired the host committee for a Chicago fundraiser to support the reelection of Mayor Ray Nagin of New Orleans, Louisiana. Information technology contractor Mark St. Pierre, who had worked contracts for both the city of New Orleans and Cook County government and contributed to both Brown and Nagin's political campaigns, organized the event. Nagin was indicted on corruption charges on January 18, 2013, with the fundraiser being cited in the indictment. He was convicted in 2014.

=== Cash gifts and "Jeans Day" controversies ===
Brown accepted cash gifts on her birthday and Christmas from her employees. In 2008 Brown announced that she would no longer accept the gifts after questions arose regarding how she claimed the items.

In January 2010, the Inspector General of Cook County investigated Brown's "Jeans Day" program, in which Clerk's office employees could donate cash to the Jeans Day fund and wear casual clothing to work on a Friday. The Jeans Day fund, which grew to over $300,000, was supposed to be used to fund employee morale activities and charities. The Inspector General's report documented expenditures unrelated to charitable causes, including Chicago Bulls tickets, Six Flags Great America tickets, and employee parking reimbursements. The Inspector General's report cleared Brown's office of wrongdoing, but advised Brown provide better controls. Brown discontinued Jeans Day in August 2010.

=== Criminal investigations into Brown and associates ===
In June 2011, a contributor to Brown's political campaigns gave a commercial property at the intersection of Pulaski, Ogden and Cermak Avenues on Chicago's southwest side to Brown's husband. Two months later, the deed was transferred to The Sankofa Group, L. L. C., Brown and her husband's for-profit consulting firm, and in November 2011 The Sankofa Group sold the property for $100,000. The Cook County inspector general and by a grand jury convened by prosecutors with the Cook County State's Attorney's office opened an investigation of the land deal.

In 2014, the Chicago Sun-Times reported that the Chicago Area Project, which had employed Brown's husband, was the subject of a criminal probe by a grand jury. Ethics concerns related to conflict of interest were raised by the newspaper, which noted that signatures on documents indicated that Brown had directly involved herself in her office's the handling of the probe's subpoenas. The newspaper also alleged that Brown had been involved in securing the granting of sizable amount of money to the group from the Illinois state government.

In 2013, it was reported that a campaign donor, Naren Patel, had given Brown's husband a parcel of land for $1. Brown's name was later added to paperwork and Sankofa Group (a private entity once registered to Brown's home) ended up on the title. Brown and her husband sold the land for $100,000. Brown did not disclose the land as a gift or donation on state economic interest forms. In October 2015, the FBI executed a search warrant at Brown's home and seized her County-issued cell phone. Chicago attorney Ed Genson represented Brown at the time.

In November 2015, a federal indictment alleged that a clerk's office employee had been rehired by the Clerk's office weeks after lending $15,000 to a company controlled by Brown's husband, then lied to a federal grand jury about the incident. The employee pleaded guilty in 2016, and claimed that the "going rate" for a job in the office had been $10,000.

In 2018, a federal probe detailed accounts of alleged job-buying in Brown's office.

In March 2019, a federal indictment charged Donald Danagher with bribery, alleging a pay-for-contract scheme which involved making donations to Brown's campaign and scholarship funds in exchange for his debt collection business receiving a contract.

On April 26, 2019, a jury convicted former Brown aide Beena Patel, who had supervised approximately 500 employees in the clerk's office, of perjury concerning her federal grand jury testimony in 2015 and 2016. In November 2019, court documents evidenced that Patel's perjury had protected Brown against prosecution.

In October 2021, Donald Donagher Jr., the former chief executive officer of a debt-collection company, admitted in federal court that he had made payments to support a Women's History Month program run by Brown in an effort to reward Brown for business he believed she had directed to him.

=== Lawsuits brought against Brown ===
In late 2019, Brown's office had a class-action lawsuit brought against it alleging that it had charged illegal fees to people seeking child support enforcement.

Legal Aid Wisconsin filed a lawsuit over Brown's failure to produce documents in a timely fashion as legally required during the COVID-19 pandemic. She also faced a separate lawsuit alleging failure to send notices of virtual hearings in a timely fashion during the pandemic.

== Activities after leaving office ==
After her successor as clerk of the Circuit Court of Cook County, Iris Martinez, was critical of the shape of the office she inherited from Brown, on December 17, 2020, Brown released a three-page statement to WGN-TV which was highly critical of Martinez. Brown accused Martinez of refusing attempts she had made to assist Martinez's transition into office. Brown wrote that Martinez, "obviously does not have a plan or a clue how to run the office."

Brown's statement included comments which attacked Martinez for hiring Puerto Rican individuals to management, writing, "Iris Martinez's administration does not look the racial make-up of Cook County, but it looks like Puerto Rico". The statement accused Martinez and her staff of, "showing disrespect to the American English language, and the English-speaking staff, by only communicating in Spanish, when non-Spanish speaking staff are present."

Brown received $5,000 for consulting services to the 2021 Dolton, Illinois mayoral campaign of Tiffany Henyard. Henyard considers Brown to be her mentor. Brown then led the transition team after Heynard was elected mayor. From October 2021 until December 31, 2021, Brown served as village administrator of Dolton, having been appointed by Heynard. The hiring of Brown to the six-figure position sparked criticism from several Dolton city trustees.

== Honors ==
In 2013, Brown was an honoree awarded at the "125 Alumni of Distinction Reception" held by the Chicago-Kent College of Law. In 2021, Brown was inducted into Southern University's Black College Alumni Hall of Fame. She has received professional achievement awards from both of these alma maters. Other honors that Brown has received include the Marks of Excellence Award from the National Forum for Black Public Administrators, the Women of Achievement Award from the Anti-Defamation League, and the Justinian Society of Lawyers Humanitarian Award.

== Personal life ==
Brown is married to Benton Cook.

== Electoral history ==
1999 Chicago City Treasurer election
Party	Candidate	Votes	%
Nonpartisan	Miriam Santos (incumbent)	292,245	51.40
Nonpartisan	Dorothy A. Brown	276,202	48.60
Total votes		568,447	100

2000 Clerk of the Circuit Court of Cook County Democratic primary
Party	Candidate	Votes	%
Democratic	Dorothy A. Brown	222,906	48.54
Democratic	Patrick J. Levar	126,642	27.57
Democratic	Patricia Young	57,999	12.63
Democratic	Joe Moore	51,707	11.26
Total votes		459,254	100

2000 Clerk of the Circuit Court of Cook County election
Party	Candidate	Votes	%
Democratic	Dorothy A. Brown	1,197,773	72.94
Republican	Nancy F. Mynard	444,336	27.06
Total votes		1,642,109	100

2004 Clerk of the Circuit Court of Cook County Democratic primary
Party	Candidate	Votes	%
Democratic	Dorothy A. Brown (incumbent)	479,438	74.52
Democratic	Jerry Orbach	163,896	25.48
Total votes		643,334	100

2004 Clerk of the Circuit Court of Cook County election
Party	Candidate	Votes	%
Democratic	Dorothy A. Brown (incumbent)	1,365,285	74.06
Republican	Judith A. Kleiderman	478,222	25.94
Total votes		1,843,507	100

2007 Chicago mayoral election
Party	Candidate	Votes	%
Nonpartisan	Richard M. Daley (incumbent)	324,519	71.05
Nonpartisan	Dorothy A. Brown	91,878	20.12
Nonpartisan	William Walls	40,368	8.84
Total votes		456,765	100

2008 Clerk of the Circuit Court of Cook County Democratic primary
Party	Candidate	Votes	%
Democratic	Dorothy A. Brown (incumbent)	833,795	100.00
Total votes		833,795	100

2008 Clerk of the Circuit Court of Cook County election
Party	Candidate	Votes	%
Democratic	Dorothy A. Brown (incumbent)	1,315,731	68.29
Republican	Diane Shapiro	517,115	26.84
Green	Paloma Andrade	93,906	4.87
Total votes		1,926,752	100

2010 President of the Cook County Board of Commissioners Democratic primary
Party	Candidate	Votes	%
Democratic	Toni Preckwinkle	281,905	48.99
Democratic	Terrence J. O'Brien	131,896	22.92
Democratic	Dorothy A. Brown	83,150	14.45
Democratic	Todd H. Stroger (incumbent)	78,532	13.65
Total votes		575,483	100

2012 Clerk of the Circuit Court of Cook County Democratic primary
Party	Candidate	Votes	%
Democratic	Dorothy A. Brown (incumbent)	269,781	67.44
Democratic	Ricardo Muñoz	130,221	32.56
Total votes		400,002	100

2012 Clerk of the Circuit Court of Cook County election
Party	Candidate	Votes	%
Democratic	Dorothy A. Brown (incumbent)	1,291,499	70.44
Republican	Diane S. Shapiro	541,973	29.56
Total votes		1,833,472	100

2016 Clerk of the Circuit Court of Cook County Democratic primary
Party	Candidate	Votes	%
Democratic	Dorothy A. Brown (incumbent)	477,503	47.27
Democratic	Michelle A. Harris	307,392	30.43
Democratic	Jacob Meister	221,921	21.97
Write-in	Tio Hardiman	4	0.00
Write-in	Others	3,247	0.32
Total votes		1,010,067	100

2016 Clerk of the Circuit Court of Cook County election
Party	Candidate	Votes	%
Democratic	Dorothy A. Brown (incumbent)	1,345,696	67.22
Republican	Diane S. Shapiro	656,232	32.78
Total votes		2,001,928	100

== Publications ==
1. Brown, Dorothy (January 3, 2015). "A Year of Achievements Roll into a New Year of More Innovations in the Clerk's Office". The Chicago Defender. Archived from the original on January 21, 2015.
2. Brown, Dorothy (November 19, 2014). "eTickets remove some of the frustration of getting a traffic ticket". The Chicago Defender. Archived from the original on January 1, 2015.
