= Gilbert Villegas =

American politician (born 1970)

Gil Villegas

Member of the Chicago City Council from the 36th ward
- Incumbent
- Assumed office May 18, 2015
- Preceded by: Nicholas Sposato (redistricted)

Personal details
- Born: October 26, 1970 (age 55) Chicago, Illinois, U.S.
- Party: Democratic
- Education: Northeastern Illinois University (BA)

Military service
- Allegiance: United States
- Branch/service: United States Marine Corps
- Unit: 2nd Light Antiaircraft Missile Battalion
- Battles/wars: Gulf War

Gilbert Villegas (born October 26, 1970) is an American politician. He is a member of the Chicago City Council, serving as alderperson for the city's 36th ward. The 36th ward includes Belmont-Cragin, Galewood, Hermosa, Humboldt Park, Montclare and Portage Park. Prior to his election to the Chicago City Council, he served as chief of staff of the Illinois Capital Development Board.

== Political career ==
=== Chicago City Council ===
In 2015, Villegas was elected as the 36th ward alderman. He was reelected in 2019 and 2023. He is a member of the following committees; Aviation, Committees, Rules and Ethics, Economic, Capital and Technology Development, Health and Environmental Protection, Pedestrian and Traffic Safety, and Transportation and Public Way. He is also a member of the Chicago City Council Latino Caucus.

Villegas has served on the boards of the Democratic Municipal Officials. the National Association of Latino Elected Officials, and the National League of Cities. He was the Vice Chair of the National League of Cities 2021 Large Cities Council.

In the runoff of the 2019 Chicago mayoral election, Villegas endorsed Lori Lightfoot. During her transition, Lightfoot named Villegas to be her floor leader in the City Council as well as the economic development committee chair.

=== 2022 Congressional Election ===
In November 2021, Villegas declared his candidacy for Illinois's 3rd congressional district in the 2022 election. During the election he was accused of “misleading the public” in campaign mailers touting the congressional candidate's support for a massive affordable housing development near the Blue Line. On June 28, 2022 he was defeated by Delia Ramirez (66% to 24%) for the Democratic primary for U.S. House Illinois 3rd Congressional District.

== Electoral history ==
Chicago 36th ward aldermanic general election, 2015
Party	Candidate	Votes	%
Nonpartisan	Omar Aquino	2,124	35.61
Nonpartisan	Gilbert Villegas	1,945	32.61
Nonpartisan	Christopher M Vittorio	1,437	24.09
Nonpartisan	Alonso Zaragoza	458	7.68
Total votes		5,964	100

Chicago 36th ward aldermanic runoff election, 2015
Party	Candidate	Votes	%
Nonpartisan	Gilbert Villegas	4,594	55.68
Nonpartisan	Omar Aquino	3,656	44.32
Total votes		8,250	100

Chicago 36th ward aldermanic general election, 2019
Party	Candidate	Votes	%
Nonpartisan	Gilbert Villegas (incumbent)	5,376	99.99
Nonpartisan	Richard Benedict Mayers (write-in)	1	0.01
Total votes		5,377	100

Illinois 3rd Congressional District Democratic Primary, 2022
Party	Candidate	Votes	%
Democratic	Delia Ramirez	37,296	66.39
Democratic	Gilbert Villegas	12,990	23.12
Democratic	Iymen Chehade	3,719	6.62
Democratic	Juan Aguirre	2,175	3.87
Total votes		56,180	100.0

Chicago 36th ward aldermanic general election, 2023
Party	Candidate	Votes	%
Nonpartisan	Gilbert "Gil" Villegas (incumbent)	4,240	46.49
Nonpartisan	Leonor "Lori" Torres Whitt	2,741	30.05
Nonpartisan	David Herrera	1,466	16.07
Nonpartisan	Jacqueline "Jackie" Baez	673	7.38
Total votes		19,120	100

Chicago 36th ward aldermanic runoff election, 2023
Party	Candidate	Votes	%
Nonpartisan	Gilbert "Gil" Villegas (incumbent)	5,934	57.31
Nonpartisan	Leonor "Lori" Torres Whitt	4,421	42.69
Total votes		10,355	100

== See also ==
- List of Chicago alderpersons since 1923
