= 2007 Chicago mayoral election =

- February 27, 2007
- Turnout: 32.44% ▲0.20 pp
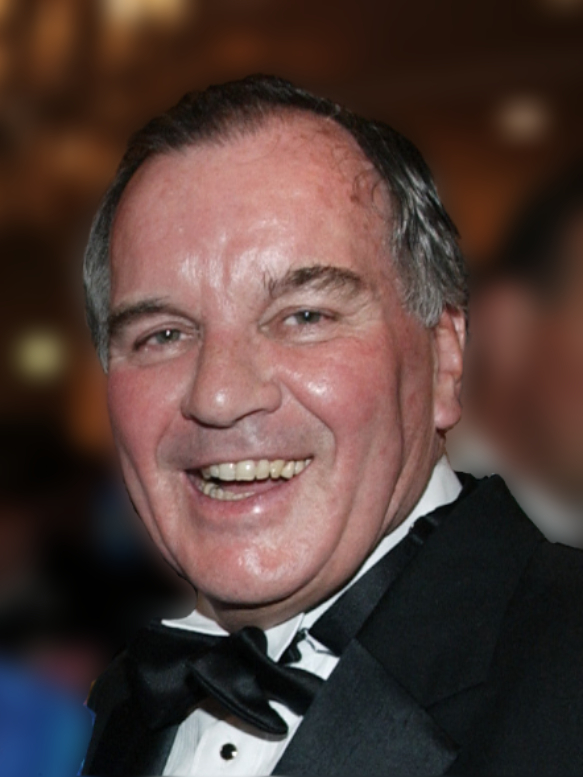

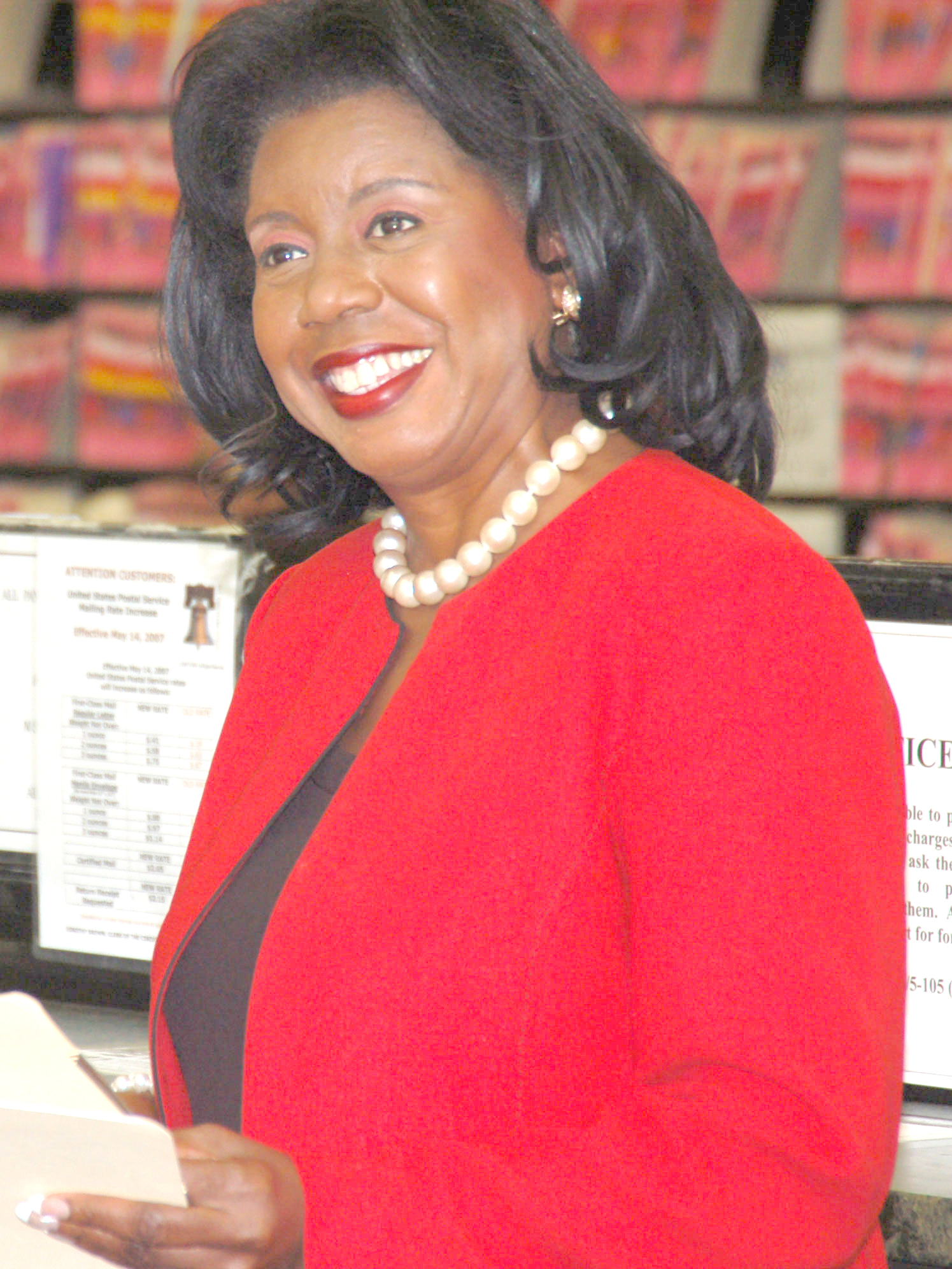

Candidate	Richard M. Daley	Dorothy Brown	William Walls
Popular vote	324,519	91,878	40,368
Percentage	71.05%	20.12%	8.84%
- Ward results Daley: 40–50% 50–60% 60–70% 70–80% 80–90% >90%
Mayor before election
Richard M. Daley
Elected Mayor
Richard M. Daley

The Chicago mayoral election of 2007 saw incumbent mayor Richard M. Daley win a landslide victory for a sixth term, garnering a 51-point margin over his closest challenger.

Daley was opposed by Cook County Circuit Court Clerk Dorothy Brown and businessman William "Dock" Walls.

== Candidates ==
- Dorothy Brown, Cook County Clerk
- Richard M. Daley, incumbent mayor
- William "Dock" Walls III, former aide to Harold Washington

=== Nominations invalid ===
The following candidates had their nominations deemed invalid by the Chicago Board of Elections, and thus were denied inclusion on the ballot:

- Thomas O'Brien
- Ziff Anthony Sistrunk
- Syron S. Smith, community activist

=== Declined ===
- Luis Gutiérrez, congressman
- Jesse Jackson Jr., congressman

== Campaign ==
Despite speculation that they might challenge Daley, congressmen Luis Gutierrez and Jesse Jackson Jr. both opted not run. Both had explored potential runs, but declared that they had opted to remain in Washington, D.C. after the Democratic Party captured control of the United States House of Representatives in the November 2006 congressional elections. Gutierrez had been exploring a 2007 bid for mayor at least as early as December 2005, when he publicly confirmed his interest in possibly running. Some analysts speculated that the true reason that both men opted against running was that they had both concluded that they lacked viable prospects of unseating Daley.

In the previous election Daley faced opponents who lacked significant campaign experience. With Brown's entry into the 2007 election, Daley was faced with an opponent with significant electoral experience. In her 2004 reelection as clerk, Brown had received just under 800,000 votes in the city of Chicago.

While both Brown and Walls were African Americans, neither were able to coalesce strong support from black voters. They also failed to enthuse much support from other groups.

While the election was nonpartisan, all three candidates were members of the Democratic Party.

Brown ran an issue-focused campaign, releasing policy papers on housing, ethics, transportation, public safety, and economic development. Some argued that, in her campaign, Brown was too light on Daley, failing to hammer him with criticism. Brown's campaign failed to garner endorsements. Walls criticized Daley's hiring practices.

Daley massively eclipsed his opponents in fundraising. Daley had nearly $6 million in funds, while Brown had less than $200,000 and Walls had less than $10,000.

Daley's fundraising advantage allowed him to run a three-week long barrage of television advertisements in advance of the election.

Daley made use of Democratic organizations in the city's wards to run his field operations.

As was the case in all of his reelection campaigns, Daley did not attend any debates.

Chicago Housing Authority head Terry Peterson resigned his position to serve as Daley's campaign manager.

=== Endorsements ===
Dorothy Brown

Organizations

- Americans for Democratic Action
- Independent Voters of Illinois-Independent Precinct Organization
Richard M. Daley

Individuals

- Luis Gutierrez, congressman
- Barack Obama, U.S. senator and candidate for the Democratic Party presidential nomination
- Bobby Rush, congressman

Newspapers

- Chicago Tribune

== Results ==
Daley won a plurality in each of Chicago's fifty wards, and obtained an absolute majority in forty-nine.

Daley even beat Brown by a broad margin in her home ward, the city's 8th ward.

Voter turnout increased slightly from the previous election, but was still the second-lowest turnout in a Chicago mayoral election. Only one-third of the city's 1.4 million registered voters participated in the election.

Mayor of Chicago 2007
Party	Candidate	Votes	%
Nonpartisan	Richard M. Daley (incumbent)	324,519	71.05
Nonpartisan	Dorothy Brown	91,878	20.12
Nonpartisan	William Walls	40,368	8.84
Write-in		22	0.00
Turnout		456,787	

=== Results by ward ===
Ward	Dorothy Brown		Richard M. Daley		William Walls, III		Total	Turnout %
Ward	Votes	%	Votes	%	Votes	%	Total	Turnout %
1	862	16.74%	3,968	77.05%	320	6.21%	5,150	18.12%
2	2,421	21.67%	7,764	69.50%	986	8.83%	11,171	33.52%
3	2,556	31.70%	4,464	55.37%	1,042	12.92%	8,062	34.89%
4	3,146	31.12%	5,355	52.97%	1,609	15.91%	10,110	35.51%
5	2,840	30.93%	4,978	54.21%	1,365	14.86%	9,183	31.66%
6	4,618	35.06%	6,370	48.36%	2,185	16.59%	13,173	35.33%
7	3,765	31.44%	6,456	53.91%	1,755	14.65%	11,976	37.38%
8	4,584	32.37%	7,178	50.68%	2,400	16.95%	14,162	37.26%
9	3,117	31.85%	5,169	52.82%	1,500	15.33%	9,786	28.79%
10	972	11.02%	7,387	83.73%	463	5.25%	8,822	33.57%
11	522	5.29%	9,104	92.32%	235	2.38%	9,861	41.91%
12	342	7.77%	3,874	88.05%	184	4.18%	4,400	33.59%
13	717	6.40%	10,164	90.66%	330	2.94%	11,211	57.04%
14	263	4.66%	5,255	93.16%	123	2.18%	5,641	48.35%
15	1,944	29.72%	3,671	56.12%	926	14.16%	6,541	24.78%
16	1,817	29.28%	3,621	58.35%	768	12.38%	6,206	26.07%
17	2,934	32.36%	4,755	52.45%	1,377	15.19%	9,066	27.39%
18	3,901	29.31%	7,638	57.39%	1,770	13.30%	13,309	38.38%
19	3,085	14.69%	16,547	78.81%	1,365	6.50%	20,997	61.28%
20	2,282	31.67%	3,842	53.32%	1,082	15.02%	7,206	30.08%
21	4,528	31.86%	7,176	50.49%	2,510	17.66%	14,214	35.29%
22	559	12.92%	3,541	81.83%	227	5.25%	4,327	29.20%
23	1,300	9.79%	11,491	86.50%	493	3.71%	13,284	46.94%
24	3,100	36.30%	4,313	50.50%	1,128	13.21%	8,541	26.59%
25	1,012	14.48%	5,606	80.22%	370	5.29%	6,988	32.75%
26	948	17.17%	4,219	76.40%	355	6.43%	5,522	23.83%
27	1,646	26.04%	4,064	64.28%	612	9.68%	6,322	22.60%
28	2,470	32.55%	4,142	54.59%	976	12.86%	7,588	25.28%
29	2,197	25.42%	5,578	64.55%	867	10.03%	8,642	37.72%
30	516	10.20%	4,311	85.20%	233	4.60%	5,060	24.61%
31	489	9.17%	4,629	86.80%	215	4.03%	5,333	26.26%
32	1,124	13.91%	6,516	80.66%	438	5.42%	8,078	24.09%
33	601	11.78%	4,266	83.63%	234	4.59%	5,101	29.33%
34	3,755	30.45%	6,632	53.78%	1,944	15.77%	12,331	31.79%
35	1,125	17.10%	5,021	76.33%	432	6.57%	6,578	28.59%
36	1,207	11.03%	9,227	84.33%	508	4.64%	10,942	39.24%
37	2,553	33.37%	4,233	55.33%	864	11.29%	7,650	26.60%
38	809	10.06%	6,889	85.71%	340	4.23%	8,038	29.72%
39	756	9.49%	6,884	86.37%	330	4.14%	7,970	33.52%
40	867	13.82%	5,082	80.99%	326	5.20%	6,275	27.68%
41	1,785	12.82%	11,516	82.68%	627	4.50%	13,928	38.52%
42	1,175	9.14%	11,084	86.25%	592	4.61%	12,851	33.16%
43	1,026	11.05%	7,797	83.98%	461	4.97%	9,284	28.19%
44	802	12.20%	5,480	83.38%	290	4.41%	6,572	20.13%
45	1,461	11.25%	10,926	84.12%	601	4.63%	12,988	42.49%
46	1,727	15.42%	8,835	78.89%	637	5.69%	11,199	37.95%
47	1,371	14.79%	7,429	80.15%	469	5.06%	9,269	31.89%
48	1,375	16.74%	6,372	77.56%	469	5.71%	8,216	29.67%
49	1,721	23.31%	5,040	68.27%	621	8.41%	7,382	34.97%
50	1,185	11.55%	8,660	84.41%	414	4.04%	10,259	42.91%

== Aftermath ==
Daley delivered a brief election night victory speech at the Chicago Hilton & Towers.

By winning the election, Daley had secured a sixth term as mayor (his fifth full four-year term, since he had first become mayor in a special election to a partial term following the death of Harold Washington). By winning his sixth mayoral election, Daley tied the record set by his father for the most Chicago mayoral election victories. During his last term, Daley surpassed his father as the longest-tenured mayor in Chicago history. This term was Daley's last, as he declined to seek reelection in 2011.

In her concession speech Brown congratulated Daley but urged residents of Chicago, "to hold this mayor accountable". She also declared that voters had, "not seen the last of Dorothy Brown". Brown would explain her loss by declaring that she believed that voters had failed to, "understand the magnitude of the crime and corruption," which had occurred under Daley's tenure. Brown was subsequently reelected as Clerk in 2008, 2012, and 2016. She ran unsuccessfully for President of the Cook County Board of Commissioners in 2010. She ran for mayor again in the 2019 election, but failed to qualify for inclusion on the ballot.

Walls ran for mayor again in 2011, 2015 and 2019.
