= Troy LaRaviere =

President of the Chicago Principals and Administrators Association
- Incumbent
- Assumed office July 2016

Personal details
- Education: University of Illinois, Urbana-Champaign

Troy A. LaRaviere is an American school administrator, educator and current president of the Chicago Principals and Administrators Association. Prior to assuming his role as President, LaRaviere served as a Chicago Public Schools (CPS) principal. He began his teacher career at CPS in 1997. LaRaviere received both a Bachelor of Science and Master of Education from the University of Illinois. LaRaviere served in the United States Navy in the late 80's. LaRaviere advocates for Progressivism, and has appeared in ads for Bernie Sanders and was a candidate for the 2019 Chicago mayoral election.
