= Larry Huggins =

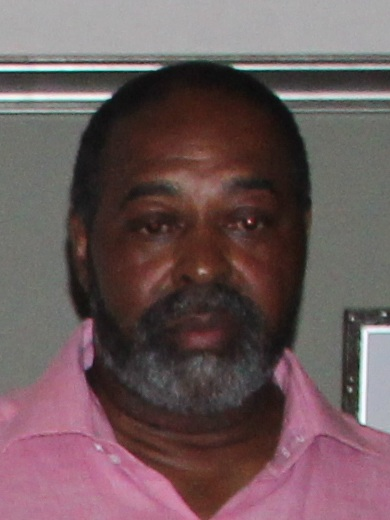
Huggins in 2012

Larry Huggins (born c. February 1950) is the president and chief executive officer of Riteway-Huggins Construction Services (formerly Riteway Construction Services Inc.) He is the former board chairman of the Chicago-area commuter rail service Metra.

== Career ==
Huggins recovered from bankruptcy in the 1970s via affirmative action for Chicago contractors. He is also and alumnus and the former principal of Englewood Technical Prep Academy. Huggins is among the contractors who built AT&T Corporate Center (now known as Franklin Center). He served as vice president of Black Contractors United in the mid-1990s. Huggins is the founder of the annual Chicago Football Classic college football game played at Soldier Field between two historically black colleges and universities. He was appointed to the board of directors of Metra by Chicago Mayor Richard M. Daley in 1997 and became acting chairman in April 2011. The board was supposed to select a permanent chairman from within its ranks by July 2011, but Huggins felt the chairmanship was a Republican position and withdrew himself from consideration. Huggins served as acting chairman until November 2, 2012 when he was replaced by Brad O'Halloran. Huggins resigned from the board in August 2013 days after O'Halloran resigned. Huggins' resignation came after conversations with Chicago Mayor Rahm Emanuel about a patronage scandal.

His company has been involved in construction at O'Hare International Airport and McCormick Place, including the $115 million no-bid contract to manage the airport's people-mover system. Riteway Construction Services Inc. was the general contractor for Cook County Hospital. His company's role with the County Hospital was controversial when Riteway missed filing its 1997 corporate annual report, leading the Illinois Secretary of State to dissolve the company on January 2, 1998 just prior to the spring 1998 groundbreaking for the $551 million, 464-bed hospital that was four years in the making.

== Personal ==
Huggins spent part of his youth in Atlanta and part of it in the Englewood community area of Chicago. His sister, Phyllis, died in 1992.
