= Natasha Korecki =

American journalist

Natasha Korecki is an American journalist with NBC News. She formerly worked as a National Correspondent with Politico. She covered the 2020 presidential campaign and Joe Biden. Korecki also covers Midwest issues for the publication. In 2019, Korecki was inducted into the hall of fame of political reporters for the University of Illinois Springfield. She has won awards including first place in Deadline Reporting from the Society of Professional Journalists, and is a Livingston Award finalist.

In 2015, she was hired by Politico to report on Illinois policy and politics. She helped launch Politico's Illinois Playbook, a daily tipsheet she authors each morning, Monday through Friday. She formerly covered politics for the Chicago Sun-Times.

In April 2016, Korecki was named the 2015 Illinois Journalist of the Year by the Department of Communications of Northern Illinois University.

Korecki, whose parents are immigrants from Argentina, led a major immigration project at the Daily Herald, involving extensive reporting in Mexico and on the United States–Mexico border.

After graduating the University of Illinois Urbana-Champaign with a bachelor degree in journalism in 1996, she worked as a reporter and legal affairs writer for the Daily Herald. Beginning in 2004, she covered federal courts for the Chicago Sun-Times. She covered high-profile trials of Rod Blagojevich, George Ryan, Tony Rezko, Conrad Black, Matthew F. Hale, and others. The "Blago" affair is covered in her 2012 book, Only in Chicago. In July 2012, she was re-assigned to cover politics, succeeding Abdon Pallasch.
