= Omar Aquino =

American politician (born 1987)

- Aquino at 2026 nurses' strike at St. Mary of the Nazarene Hospital

Member of the Illinois Senate from the 2nd district
- Incumbent
- Assumed office July 1, 2016
- Preceded by: William Delgado

Personal details
- Born: June 24, 1987 (age 39) Chicago, Illinois, U.S.
- Party: Democratic
- Education: Loyola University Chicago (BA, BS)

Omar Aquino (born June 24, 1987) is an American politician serving as a member of the Illinois Senate, representing the 2nd district. A Democrat, he was elected in the March 2016 Democratic primary and appointed to the seat effective July 1, 2016, following the retirement of William Delgado. Sworn into office at age 29, he is the youngest-ever Latino member of the Illinois State Senate and one of the youngest state senators in Illinois history. Previously, he served as an aide to Congresswoman Tammy Duckworth.

== Early life and career ==
Aquino was born and raised on the Northwest Side of Chicago. Of Puerto Rican descent, both of his parents were public workers, his mother working for the Chicago Public Schools and his father for the Chicago Department of Streets and Sanitation. Aquino graduated from Lincoln Park High School and Loyola University Chicago with both a Bachelor of Science in Criminal Justice and a Bachelor of Arts in Sociology in 2009.

== Public service ==
Aquino worked as a bilingual case manager with the Illinois Department on Aging, serving low income elderly clients in Chicago as part of the Community Care Program. He went on to serve as a Legislative Aide in the Illinois House of Representatives, and most recently as an Outreach Coordinator for Congresswoman Tammy Duckworth.

== 2015 aldermanic campaign ==
Chicago conducted redistricting following the 2010 census, and a new Latino ward was created, the 36th Ward. Aquino decided to run for this open seat in the Chicago aldermanic elections, 2015. While he received the largest number of votes in the February election, there was an April runoff between Aquino and Gilbert Villegas. Aquino lost the election to Villegas by 938 votes.

== State senator ==
Aquino announced in January 2016 he was running for the 2nd District State Senate seat that was being vacated by William Delgado. He ran with the endorsement of Delgado himself, most of the committeemen and elected officials in the district, as well as many labor and progressive groups including the Chicago Teachers Union and Service Employees International Union. He won the March 2016 primary against Noble Network of Charter Schools employee Angelica Alfaro by a 53% to 47% margin. As Delgado decided to retire from the seat early, Aquino was appointed to the seat effective July 1, 2016.

As of July 2022, Senator Aquino is a member of the following Illinois Senate committees:

- (Chairman of) Appropriations - General Services Committee (SAPP-SAGS)
- Appropriations Committee (SAPP)
- Education Committee (SESE)
- Energy and Public Utilities Committee (SENE)
- Executive Committee (SEXC)
- Executive Appointments Committee (SEXA)
- Executive - Elections Committee (SEXC-SEOE)
- (Chairman of) Executive - Procurement Committee (SEXC-SEOP)
- Higher Education Committee (SCHE)
- Human Rights Committee (SHUM)
- (Chairman of) Redistricting Committee (SRED)
- Redistricting - Chicago Northwest Committee (SRED-SRNW)
