= Capital Development Board =

State agency in Illinois, United States

Board overview
- Jurisdiction: Illinois
- Headquarters: William G. Stratton Building
- Board executive: Jim Underwood, Executive Director
- Key document: Capital Development Board Act (20 ILCS 3105)
- Website: www.illinois.gov/cdb

The Capital Development Board (CDB) is an independent agency of the U.S. state of Illinois. The CDB, as an acronym, refers both to the seven-member bipartisan board of directors and to the agency that it oversees. The members of the CDB, who are appointed by the Governor of Illinois, in turn appoint an executive director who is responsible for the day-to-day management of the agency. The agency is headquartered in the state capital of Springfield, with a second headquarters in Chicago.

== Responsibilities ==
The Capital Development Board is the construction manager for the capital projects of the state of Illinois and its public universities. It has responsibilities for the renovation and capital upkeep of the 8,771 properties owned by the state, and for the construction of new buildings if required. In addition, the CDB has been instructed from time to time by the Illinois General Assembly to lend its construction-manager skills to local public school districts for state-aided construction projects, and to local providers to build public-use facilities such as child-care centers, senior-activity centers, and public health clinics. As of 2015, over 500 Illinois elementary and secondary school districts have worked with CDB to build or rebuild their educational infrastructure.

The CDB contains a Division of Building Codes and Regulations. In two areas, plumbing and energy conservation, the state of Illinois has adopted statewide mandates for the local building codes of Illinois. In addition, the Division serves as a repository and informational clearinghouse for the county and municipal building codes adopted by local governmental ordinance throughout Illinois.
