= 2014 Illinois gubernatorial election =

- November 4, 2014
- Turnout: 48.48% ▼1.21 pp
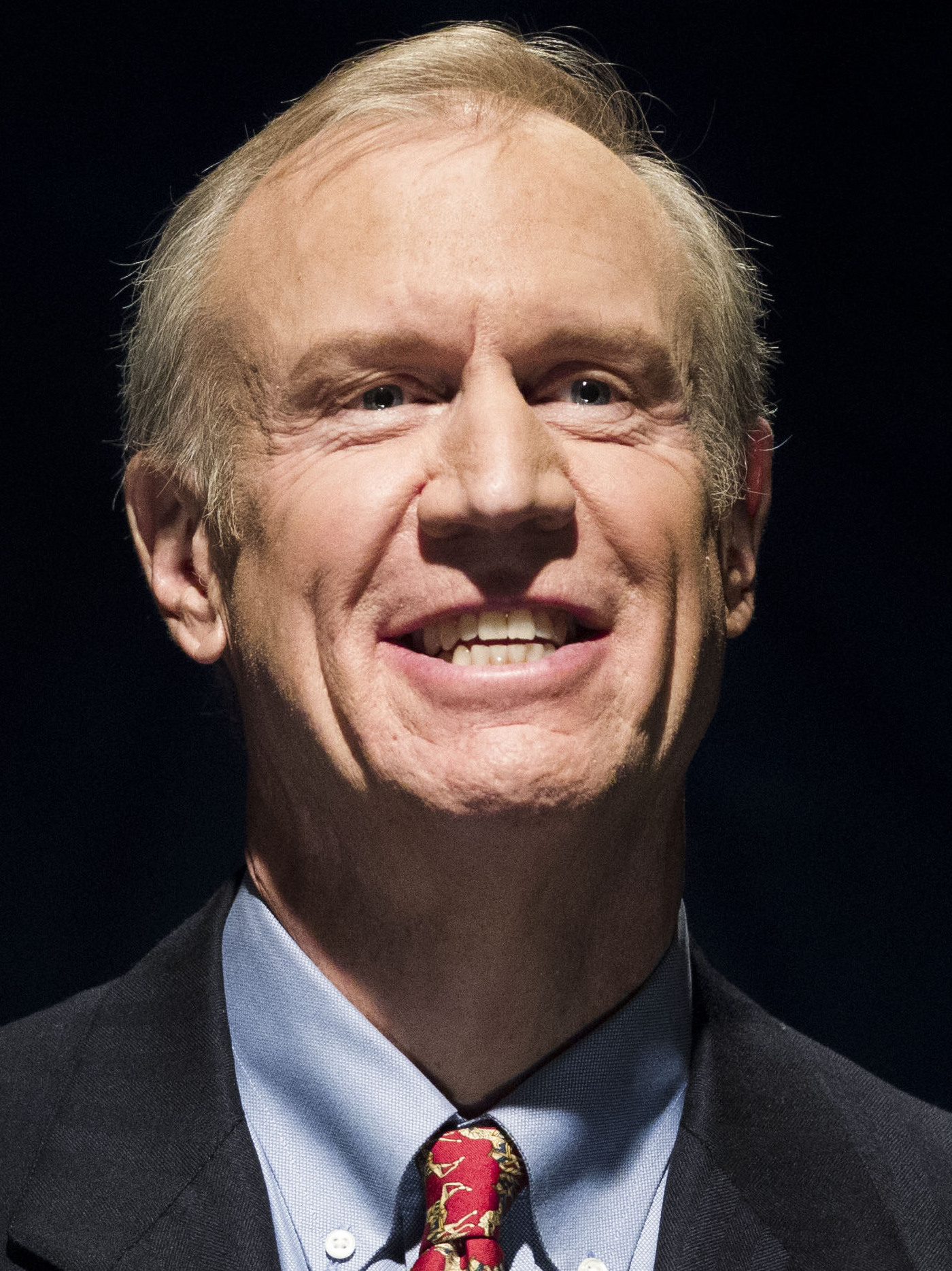

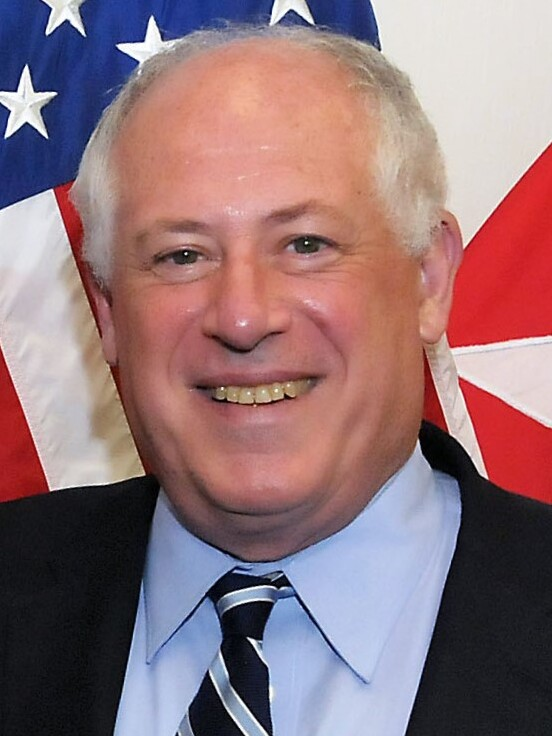
Nominee	Bruce Rauner	Pat Quinn
Party	Republican	Democratic
Running mate	Evelyn Sanguinetti	Paul Vallas
Popular vote	1,823,627	1,681,343
Percentage	50.27%	46.35%
- Rauner: 40–50% 50–60% 60–70% 70–80% 80–90% >90% Quinn: 40–50% 50–60% 60–70% 70–80% 80–90% >90% Tie: 40–50% No votes
Governor before election
Pat Quinn
Democratic
Elected Governor
Bruce Rauner
Republican

The 2014 Illinois gubernatorial election was held on November 4, 2014, to elect the governor and lieutenant governor of Illinois, concurrently with the election to Illinois's Class II U.S. Senate seat, as well as other elections to the United States Senate in other states and elections to the United States House of Representatives and various state and local elections.

Before this cycle, candidates for governor and lieutenant governor were nominated separately, and the primary winners ran on the same ticket in the general election. In 2011, the law was changed to allow candidates for governor to pick their own running mates. Incumbent Democratic Lieutenant Governor Sheila Simon did not run for reelection, instead running unsuccessfully for comptroller. She was replaced as Quinn's running mate by Paul Vallas, a former CEO of Chicago Public Schools. Rauner chose Wheaton City councilwoman Evelyn Sanguinetti as his running mate and Grimm chose Alex Cummings.

Incumbent Democratic governor Pat Quinn ran for re-election to a second full term in office. Quinn, then the lieutenant governor, assumed the office of governor on January 29, 2009, upon the impeachment and removal of Rod Blagojevich. He narrowly won a full term in 2010. Primary elections were held on March 18, 2014. Quinn won the Democratic primary, while the Republicans chose businessman Bruce Rauner and the Libertarians nominated political activist Chad Grimm.

Rauner defeated Quinn in the general election with 50.3% of the vote to Quinn's 46.4%, winning every county in the state except for Cook County, home to the city of Chicago and 40% of the state's residents. Quinn was the only incumbent Democratic governor to lose a general election in 2014 and remained the last one to do so until Nevada's Steve Sisolak in 2022. Rauner became the second Republican to be elected governor of Illinois while carrying all but one county, the other being Jim Edgar in 1994. This was the only time since 1998 that a Republican was elected Governor of Illinois.

As of 2026, this alongside the concurrent comptroller election is the only time since 2010 that Republicans won a statewide election in Illinois. This is also the most recent Illinois gubernatorial election in which the winner won a majority of counties or won by a single-digit margin. Quinn later ran for Illinois Attorney General in 2018 and lost the Democratic primary.

== Background ==
The primaries and general elections coincided with those for federal (House and Senate) and those for other state offices. The election was part of the 2014 Illinois elections.

For the primary election, turnout was 16.88%, with 1,267,028 votes cast. For the general election, turnout was 48.48%, with 3,627,690 votes cast.

== Democratic primary ==
=== Candidates ===
==== Declared ====
- Tio Hardiman, former director of CeaseFire
  - Running mate: Brunell Donald, attorney, author and motivational speaker.
- Pat Quinn, incumbent governor of Illinois
  - Running mate: Paul Vallas, former CEO of Chicago Public Schools and candidate for governor in 2002

==== Withdrew ====
- William M. Daley, former White House Chief of Staff and former United States Secretary of Commerce

==== Declined ====
- John Atkinson, businessman
- Tom Dart, Cook County Sheriff
- Alexi Giannoulias, former Illinois Treasurer and nominee for the U.S. Senate in 2010
- David H. Hoffman, member of the Illinois Reform Commission, former Chicago Inspector General and candidate for the U.S. Senate in 2010
- Daniel Hynes, former Illinois Comptroller, candidate for the U.S. Senate in 2004 and candidate for governor in 2010
- Lisa Madigan, Illinois Attorney General (running for re-election)
- Toni Preckwinkle, President of the Cook County Board of Commissioners
- Kwame Raoul, state senator

=== Endorsements ===
William Daley (withdrew)
- Michael Bloomberg, former Mayor of New York City
Pat Quinn
- Cook County Democratic Party
- Barack Obama, President of the United States
- Michelle Obama, First Lady of the United States
- Danny K. Davis, U.S. representative (IL-07)
- Luis Gutierrez, U.S. representative (IL-04)
- Chicago Tribune
- Democratic Party of Illinois
- Teamsters Joint Council
- Illinois Democratic County Chairmen's Association

=== Polling ===
Poll source	Date(s) administered	Sample size	Margin of error	Pat Quinn	Tio Hardiman	Other	Undecided
Strive Strategies	March 9, 2014	563	± 4.21%	64%	36%	—	—

Hypothetical polling

Poll source	Date(s) administered	Sample size	Margin of error	Pat Quinn	Bill Daley	Lisa Madigan	Kwame Raoul	Other	Undecided
We Ask America	August 6, 2013	1,528	± ?	27%	23%	—	13%	—	37%
We Ask America	July 19, 2013	1,394	± ?	38%	33%	—	—	—	29%
We Ask America	June 13, 2013	1,322	± 2.8%	21%	22%	32%	—	—	25%
We Ask America	June 13, 2013	1,322	± 2.8%	37%	38%	—	—	—	25%
We Ask America	June 13, 2013	1,322	± 2.8%	33%	—	44%	—	—	23%
Paul Simon Institute	January 27–February 8, 2013	310	± 5.5%	22.9%	11.9%	31.9%	—	4.8%	28.4%
We Ask America	January 30, 2013	1,255	± 3%	20%	15%	37%	—	—	18%
We Ask America	January 30, 2013	1,255	± 3%	38%	33%	—	—	—	29%
We Ask America	January 30, 2013	1,255	± 3%	26%	—	51%	—	—	23%
Public Policy Polling	November 26–28, 2012	319	± 5.5%	34%	37%	—	—	—	29%
Public Policy Polling	November 26–28, 2012	319	± 5.5%	20%	—	64%	—	—	17%

=== Results ===
County results

Democratic primary results
Party	Candidate	Votes	%
Democratic	Pat Quinn (incumbent)	321,818	71.94
Democratic	Tio Hardiman	125,500	28.06
Total votes		447,318	100.00

== Republican primary ==
By early summer 2013, the field seeking the Republican nomination was set at four candidates. Two of them, state senators Bill Brady and Kirk Dillard, had sought the nomination in 2010, with Brady edging out Dillard by 193 votes, but ultimately losing to Pat Quinn by less than 1 percent. Dan Rutherford, who was elected state treasurer in 2010 after serving as a state representative and state senator, formally entered the race on June 2.

Rauner had announced the formation of an exploratory committee in March and made his entry into the Republican field official on June 5. Despite longstanding rumors that Rauner was committed to spending $50 million on his campaign, he denied in an interview ever specifying a dollar figure.

By the date of the primary, Rauner had broken the previous record for self-funding in an Illinois gubernatorial race by putting more than $6 million of his own money into his campaign. In total, he raised more than $14 million before the primary election.

On March 18, 2014, Rauner won the Republican primary, collecting 40% of the vote, compared to 37% for State Senator Kirk Dillard.

=== Candidates ===
==== Declared ====
- Bill Brady, state senator, candidate for governor in 2006 and nominee for governor in 2010
  - Running mate: Maria Rodriguez, former Village President of Long Grove
- Kirk Dillard, state senator and candidate for governor in 2010
  - Running mate: Jil Tracy, state representative
- Bruce Rauner, businessman and former chairman of GTCR
  - Running mate: Evelyn Sanguinetti, Wheaton City Councilwoman
- Dan Rutherford, Illinois Treasurer
  - Running mate: Steve Kim, Attorney and nominee for Illinois Attorney General in 2010

==== Removed ====
- Peter Edward Jones (removed from the ballot)
  - Running mate: None

==== Declined ====
- Adam Andrzejewski, businessman and candidate for governor in 2010
- Dan Duffy, state senator
- Adam Kinzinger, U.S. representative
- Ray LaHood, former United States Secretary of Transportation and former U.S. representative
- Matt Murphy, state senator
- Dan Proft, talk radio personality and candidate for governor in 2010
- Christine Radogno, Minority Leader of the Illinois Senate
- Aaron Schock, U.S. representative
- Joe Walsh, conservative radio talk show host and former U.S. representative

=== Endorsements ===
Kirk Dillard
- Jim Edgar, former governor of Illinois
- James R. Thompson, former governor of Illinois
- Illinois Education Association
- American Federation of State and Municipal Employees' Council 31
- Illinois Federation of Teachers
- The Daily Herald
Bruce Rauner
- Dan Duffy, state senator
- Chicago Tribune
- Crain's Chicago Business
- Shaw Media
- Cook County GOP

=== Polling ===
Poll source	Date(s) administered	Sample size	Margin of error	Adam Andrzejewski	Bill Brady	Kirk Dillard	Dan Proft	Bruce Rauner	Dan Rutherford	Aaron Schock	Joe Walsh	Other	Undecided
We Ask America	March 17, 2014	1,126	± 3%	—	19%	27%	—	44%	9%	—	—	—	—
Illinois Mirror/WAS	March 16, 2014	1,162	± 3%	—	15%	26%	—	32%	5%	—	—	—	21%
We Ask America	March 11, 2014	1,235	± 2.9%	—	19%	26%	—	46%	9%	—	—	—	—
Tribune/WGN-TV	March 1–5, 2014	600	± 4%	—	18%	23%	—	36%	9%	—	—	—	13%
We Ask America	March 4, 2014	1,262	± 2.85%	—	12%	14%	—	40%	8%	—	—	—	26%
We Ask America	February 25, 2014	1,178	± 3%	—	13%	17%	—	36%	7%	—	—	—	27%
McKeon & Assoc.*	February 18–19, 2014	831	± 3.6%	—	24%	13%	—	32%	3%	—	—	—	18%
We Ask America	February 18, 2014	1,323	± ?	—	14%	13%	—	35%	8%	—	—	—	30%
Tribune/WGN-TV	February 5–8, 2014	600	± 4%	—	20%	11%	—	40%	13%	—	—	—	15%
We Ask America	January 14, 2014	1,139	± 2.9%	—	17%	9%	—	34%	15%	—	—	—	25%
Ogden & Fry	January 2014	778	± 2.5%	—	8%	6%	—	18%	10%	—	—	—	58%
We Ask America	November 26, 2013	1,233	± 2.79%	—	18%	10%	—	26%	17%	—	—	—	29%
Public Policy Polling	November 22–25, 2013	375	± 5.1%	—	17%	10%	—	24%	14%	—	—	—	36%
We Ask America	November 14, 2013	1,191	± 2.94%	—	25%	14%	—	11%	18%	—	—	—	32%
Battleground Polling	November 3–11, 2013	535	± 3.97%	—	13%	12%	—	12%	18%	—	—	—	45%
We Ask America	August 13, 2013	1,102	± ?	—	21%	10%	—	14%	17%	—	—	—	32%
We Ask America	June 20, 2013	1,310	± 2.8%	—	18%	11%	—	12%	22%	—	—	—	38%
Battleground Polling	May 20–27, 2013	400	± 4.8%	—	19%	14%	13%	5%	27%	—	—	22%	—
Paul Simon Institute	January 27–February 8, 2013	186	± 7.2%	2%	10%	3%	2%	—	10%	9%	6%	5%	53%
Public Policy Polling	November 26–28, 2012	303	± 5.6%	—	14%	12%	—	7%	19%	18%	8%	7%	15%

- * Internal poll for Bill Brady campaign

=== Results ===
County results

Republican primary results
Party	Candidate	Votes	%
Republican	Bruce Rauner	328,934	40.13
Republican	Kirk Dillard	305,120	37.22
Republican	Bill Brady	123,708	15.09
Republican	Dan Rutherford	61,848	7.55
Total votes		819,624	100.00

== Third party and Independents ==
=== Candidates ===
==== Declared ====
- Chad Grimm (Libertarian), political activist, candidate for the State House in 2012 and candidate for the Peoria City Council in 2013
  - Running mate: Alex Cummings

==== Removed from ballot ====
- Mike Oberline (Constitution)
  - Running mate: Don Stone
- Scott Summers (Green)
  - Running mate: Bob Pritchett Jr.

==== Declined ====
- Sam McCann (Independent), Republican state senator

== General election ==
=== Debates ===
- Complete video of debate, October 9, 2014 - C-SPAN
- Complete video of debate, October 20, 2014 - C-SPAN

=== Predictions ===
Source	Ranking	As of
The Cook Political Report	Tossup	November 3, 2014
Sabato's Crystal Ball	Lean D	November 3, 2014
Rothenberg Political Report	Tossup	November 3, 2014
Real Clear Politics	Tossup	November 3, 2014

=== Polling ===
Poll source	Date(s) administered	Sample size	Margin of error	Pat Quinn (D)	Bruce Rauner (R)	Chad Grimm (L)	Other	Undecided
Public Policy Polling	November 1–2, 2014	1,064	± 3%	47%	45%	3%	—	5%
Public Policy Polling	November 1–2, 2014	1,064	± 3%	48%	48%	—	—	4%
McKeon & Associates	October 28, 2014	823	± 3.9%	45%	42%	4%	—	9%
We Ask America	October 27–28, 2014	2,327	± 3%	50%	45%	6%	—	—
CBS News/NYT/YouGov	October 16–23, 2014	3,519	± 3%	45%	41%	—	1%	13%
Rasmussen Reports	October 20–22, 2014	1,000	± 3%	47%	48%	—	2%	4%
APC Research	October 16–21, 2014	800	± 3.5%	43%	45%	4%	—	7%
Southern Illinois University	September 23 – October 15, 2014	1,006 RV	± 3%	41%	39%	5%	1%	15%
Southern Illinois University	September 23 – October 15, 2014	691 LV	± 3.7%	41%	42%	3%	1%	13%
We Ask America	October 8, 2014	1,051	± 3.02%	44%	41%	7%	—	8%
University of Illinois Springfield	October 2–8, 2014	723	± 3.7%	41%	43%	—	2%	14%
We Ask America	October 6, 2014	1,097	± 3%	44%	40%	6%	—	11%
CBS News/NYT/YouGov	September 20 – October 1, 2014	3,955	± 2%	46%	43%	—	1%	10%
Communication Express	September 30, 2014	1,208	± 2.87%	37%	43%	5%	—	16%
Fabrizio Lee	September 27–29, 2014	600	± 4%	41%	39%	5%	—	15%
Rasmussen Reports	September 24–25, 2014	750	± 4%	44%	42%	—	6%	8%
Battleground Polling	September 23–24, 2014	408	± 4.8%	43%	43%	6%	—	8%
We Ask America	September 18–19, 2014	1,418	± 3%	41%	44%	6%	—	9%
Global Strategy Group	September 4–7, 2014	605	± 4%	43%	40%	5%	—	12%
APC Research	September 3–5, 2014	800	± 3.5%	48%	37%	5%	—	10%
We Ask America	September 2, 2014	1,064	± 3%	37%	46%	7%	—	10%
CBS News/NYT/YouGov	August 18 – September 2, 2014	4,363	± 3%	40%	44%	—	2%	13%
Garin Hart Yang Research Group*	August 12–14, 2014	802	± 3.5%	43%	46%	—	—	11%
We Ask America	August 5–6, 2014	1,085	± 3.12%	38%	51%	—	—	11%
Gravis Marketing	August 4–5, 2014	567	± 4%	40%	48%	—	—	12%
Rasmussen Reports	July 29–30, 2014	750	± 4%	39%	44%	—	7%	10%
We Ask America	July 28, 2014	1,087	± 2.97%	33%	47%	—	—	20%
Mellman Group^	July 27–29, 2014	600	± 5%	38%	39%	—	—	23%
Harstad Strategic Research	July 17–22, 2014	1,003	± 3.1%	42%	46%	—	3%	8%
CBS News/NYT/YouGov	July 5–24, 2014	5,298	± 2.1%	43%	46%	—	2%	8%
McKeon & Associates	July 9–10, 2014	800	± 3.9%	34%	40%	—	—	26%
Capitol Fax/We Ask America	July 8, 2014	940	± 3.2%	39%	51%	—	—	10%
We Ask America	June 10–11, 2014	1,075	± 3%	37%	47%	—	—	16%
Where America Stands	May 12, 2014	1,168	± 3%	31%	49%	1%	3%	16%
We Ask America	April 27, 2014	?	± 3.14%	44%	44%	—	—	12%
We Ask America	April 21, 2014	?	± 3.21%	38%	49%	—	—	13%
Rasmussen Reports	April 9–10, 2014	750	± 4%	40%	43%	—	6%	10%
Where America Stands	March 27, 2014	1,033	± 3%	32%	46%	1%	2%	19%
Gravis Marketing	March 21–22, 2014	806	± 3%	35%	43%	—	—	22%
We Ask America	January 30, 2014	1,354	± 2.7%	39%	47%	—	—	14%
Public Policy Polling	November 22–25, 2013	557	± 4.2%	41%	38%	—	—	21%

Hypothetical polling

With Quinn

Poll source	Date(s) administered	Sample size	Margin of error	Pat Quinn (D)	Bill Brady (R)	Undecided
We Ask America	January 30, 2014	1,354	± 2.7%	39%	48%	13%
Public Policy Polling	November 22–25, 2013	557	± 4.2%	41%	41%	18%

Poll source	Date(s) administered	Sample size	Margin of error	Pat Quinn (D)	Kirk Dillard (R)	Undecided
We Ask America	January 30, 2014	1,354	± 2.7%	37%	46%	17%
Public Policy Polling	November 22–25, 2013	557	± 4.2%	39%	39%	21%
Public Policy Polling	November 26–28, 2012	500	± 4.4%	37%	44%	19%

Poll source	Date(s) administered	Sample size	Margin of error	Pat Quinn (D)	Dan Rutherford (R)	Undecided
We Ask America	January 30, 2014	1,354	± 2.7%	37%	46%	17%
Public Policy Polling	November 22–25, 2013	557	± 4.2%	39%	41%	20%
Public Policy Polling	November 26–28, 2012	500	± 4.4%	39%	43%	18%

Poll source	Date(s) administered	Sample size	Margin of error	Pat Quinn (D)	Aaron Schock (R)	Undecided
Public Policy Polling	November 26–28, 2012	500	± 4.4%	40%	39%	21%

With Daley

Poll source	Date(s) administered	Sample size	Margin of error	Bill Daley (D)	Kirk Dillard (R)	Undecided
Public Policy Polling	November 26–28, 2012	500	± 4.4%	34%	36%	30%

Poll source	Date(s) administered	Sample size	Margin of error	Bill Daley (D)	Dan Rutherford (R)	Undecided
Public Policy Polling	November 26–28, 2012	500	± 4.4%	37%	38%	25%

Poll source	Date(s) administered	Sample size	Margin of error	Bill Daley (D)	Aaron Schock (R)	Undecided
Public Policy Polling	November 26–28, 2012	500	± 4.4%	40%	35%	25%

With Emanuel

Poll source	Date(s) administered	Sample size	Margin of error	Rahm Emanuel (D)	Dan Rutherford (R)	Undecided
Public Policy Polling	November 22–25, 2013	557	± 4.2%	40%	38%	22%

With Hynes

Poll source	Date(s) administered	Sample size	Margin of error	Daniel Hynes (D)	Dan Rutherford (R)	Undecided
Public Policy Polling	November 22–25, 2013	557	± 4.2%	34%	34%	32%

With Madigan

Poll source	Date(s) administered	Sample size	Margin of error	Lisa Madigan (D)	Kirk Dillard (R)	Undecided
Public Policy Polling	November 26–28, 2012	500	± 4.4%	46%	37%	17%

Poll source	Date(s) administered	Sample size	Margin of error	Lisa Madigan (D)	Dan Rutherford (R)	Undecided
Public Policy Polling	November 22–25, 2013	557	± 4.2%	45%	40%	15%
Public Policy Polling	November 26–28, 2012	500	± 4.4%	46%	37%	18%

Poll source	Date(s) administered	Sample size	Margin of error	Lisa Madigan (D)	Aaron Schock (R)	Undecided
Public Policy Polling	November 26–28, 2012	500	± 4.4%	46%	38%	17%

- * Internal Poll for Dick Durbin campaign
- ^ Internal Poll for Pat Quinn campaign

=== Results ===
2014 Illinois gubernatorial election
Party	Candidate	Votes	%	±%
Republican	Bruce Rauner	1,823,627	50.27%	+4.33%
Democratic	Pat Quinn (incumbent)	1,681,343	46.35%	−0.44%
Libertarian	Chad Grimm	121,534	3.35%	+2.42%
Write-in		1,186	0.03%	N/A
Total votes		3,627,690	100.00%	N/A
Republican gain from Democratic				

==== Counties that flipped from Democratic to Republican ====
- Alexander (largest city: Cairo)
- Jackson (largest city: Carbondale)
- St. Clair (largest city: Belleville)

==== By congressional district ====
Rauner won 12 of 18 districts, including four that elected Democrats.

District	Quinn	Rauner	Representative
1st	71%	27%	Bobby Rush
2nd	73%	25%	Robin Kelly
3rd	48.7%	48.8%	Dan Lipinski
4th	72%	25%	Luis Gutierrez
5th	55%	43%	Mike Quigley
6th	32%	65%	Peter Roskam
7th	81%	18%	Danny K. Davis
8th	43%	54%	Tammy Duckworth
9th	54%	44%	Jan Schakowsky
10th	43%	55%	Brad Schneider
10th	43%	55%	Robert Dold
11th	46%	52%	Bill Foster
12th	38%	56%	William Enyart
12th	38%	56%	Mike Bost
13th	38%	57%	Rodney Davis
14th	32%	65%	Randy Hultgren
15th	23%	71%	John Shimkus
16th	35%	61%	Adam Kinzinger
17th	43%	52%	Cheri Bustos
18th	28%	66%	Aaron Schock

== See also ==
- 2014 Illinois elections
- 2014 United States Senate election in Illinois
- 2014 United States gubernatorial elections
- 2014 United States elections
