= Paul Vallas =

American politician and school administrator (born 1953)

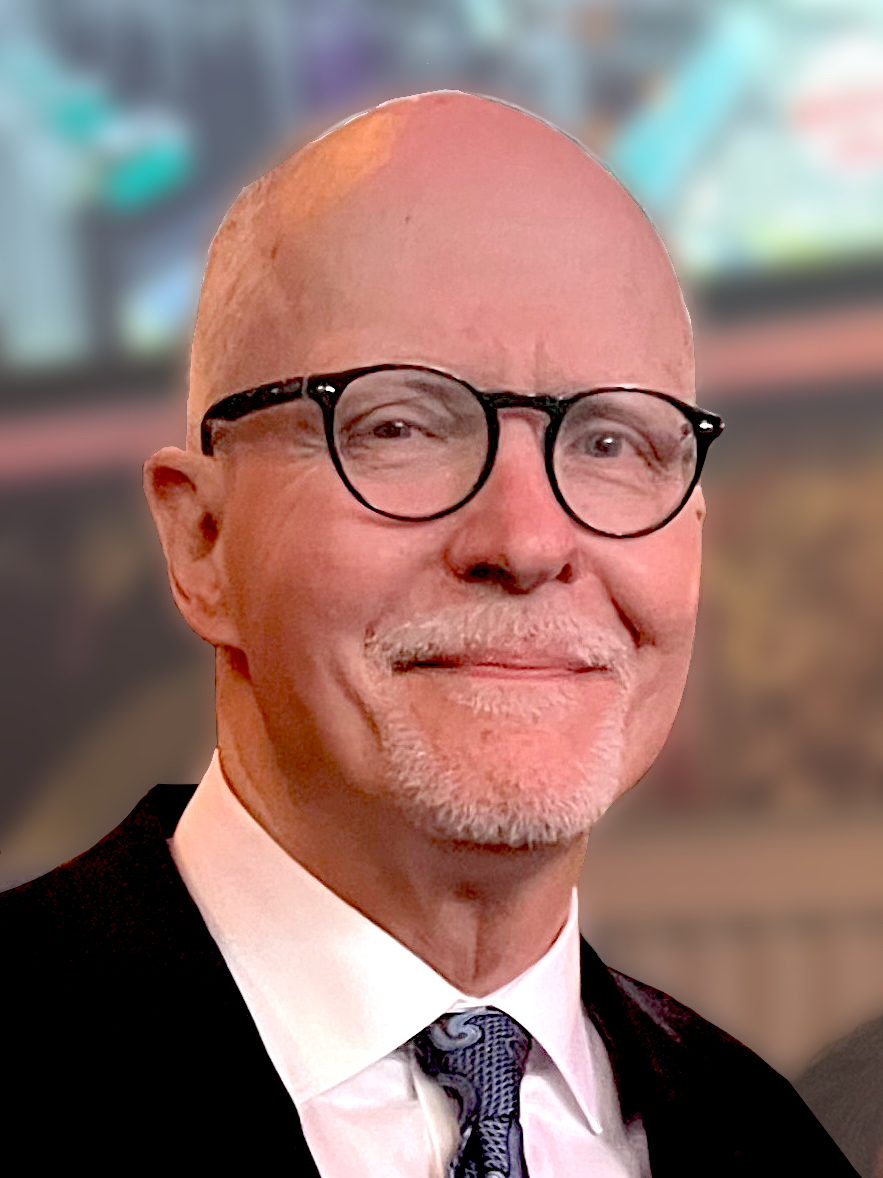
- Vallas in March 2023

Superintendent of Bridgeport Public Schools
- In office January 3, 2012 – November 8, 2013; Acting: January 3, 2012 – June 24, 2013
- Preceded by: John Ramos
- Succeeded by: Fran Rabinowitz (acting)

Superintendent of the Recovery School District of Louisiana
- In office June 2007 – May 1, 2011
- Preceded by: Robin Jarvis
- Succeeded by: John White

CEO of the School District of Philadelphia
- In office July 2002 – June 2007
- Preceded by: Phil Goldsmith
- Succeeded by: Thomas Brady (acting)

1st CEO of Chicago Public Schools
- In office July 10, 1995 – June 26, 2001
- Appointed by: Richard M. Daley
- Preceded by: Argie Johnson (superintendent)
- Succeeded by: Arne Duncan

Personal details
- Born: Paul Gust Vallas; June 10, 1953 (age 73) Chicago, Illinois, U.S.
- Party: Democratic
- Spouse: Sharon Vallas (m. 1984)
- Children: 3
- Education: Moraine Valley Community College; Western Illinois University (BA, MA)

Paul Gust Vallas Sr. (/ˈvæləs/ VAL-əs; born June 10, 1953) is a former education superintendent. He served as the superintendent of the Bridgeport Public Schools in Connecticut and the Recovery School District of Louisiana, the CEO of both the School District of Philadelphia and the Chicago Public Schools, and a budget director for the city of Chicago.

As a school superintendent, Vallas was noted for his embrace of charter schools and privatization of school programs and school management.

A member of the Democratic Party, Vallas has unsuccessfully sought elected office several times. Vallas was the runner-up in the Democratic primary of the 2002 Illinois gubernatorial election. He ran as the Democratic nominee for lieutenant governor in the 2014 Illinois gubernatorial election. Vallas was a candidate in the 2019 Chicago mayoral election. He was also most recently the runner-up in the 2023 Chicago mayoral election. After finishing first in the initial round of that election without securing a majority, Vallas faced Brandon Johnson in a runoff election and was defeated.

== Early life and career ==
The grandson of Greek immigrants, Vallas grew up in the Roseland neighborhood on Chicago's South Side. He spent his teen years living in Palos Heights. He graduated from Carl Sandburg High School and attended Moraine Valley Community College and then Western Illinois University, where he received a bachelor's degree in history and political science, a master's degree in political science, and a teaching certificate.

From 1985 until 1990, Vallas led the Illinois Economic and Fiscal Commission. From 1990 until 1993, Vallas served as Chicago's municipal budget director under Mayor Richard M. Daley.

== Superintendencies ==
Vallas served as superintendent of school districts in four United States cities. Mitch Smith of The New York Times retrospectively wrote that in these positions, Vallas "cultivated a reputation as a crisis manager and charter school supporter willing to take on hard jobs and implement sweeping changes, an approach that garnered a mix of praise and criticism". In a 2009 article in the Education Next academic journal, Dale Mezzacappa wrote of Vallas's leadership style in his Chicago and Philadelphia superintendencies "His energy level is boundless, his temper legendary, his gangly charm equally so. His style of leadership, the 'Vallas treatment,' is by now well established. Do things big, do them fast, and do them all at once."

=== CEO of Chicago Public Schools ===
Vallas served as CEO of the Chicago Public Schools (CPS) from 1995 to 2001. The position of CEO of the Chicago Public School system had been created by Mayor Richard M. Daley after he convinced the Illinois State Legislature to place CPS under mayoral control.

During his tenure at CPS, Vallas led an effort to reform the school system. President Bill Clinton cited his work for raising test scores, balancing the budget, instituting several new programs, including mandatory summer school, and after-school programs, and expanding alternative, charter, and magnet schools. Under Vallas's leadership, the use of standardized testing increased.

Vallas instated zero-tolerance discipline policies. He also expanded the number of non-neighborhood schools, which included selective enrollment high schools, charter schools, and some of the city's first public military schools. He also launched thirteen International Baccalaureate programs in the city's public high schools.

In 1995, CPS faced a projected 1999 deficit of $1.4 billion. To address that deficit, Vallas submitted a plan that he claimed would save $162 million by reducing 1,700 central office staffers, raising cash by selling 20 surplus properties, and eliminating a program, described as "elaborate", to network the district's computers. The plan also reallocated money earmarked for teacher pensions into a general operating budget. This reallocation was implemented. In later years, in tandem, a decrease in returns from the stock market and an increasing number of retirees would cause the CPS to be unable to make their full payments on time. This has been identified as an inciting incident for the subsequent $1 billion budget crisis, attributed largely to spiking pension payments in later years. $666 million in capital bonds that the district took out under Vallas's leadership are anticipated, as of 2023, to ultimately cost the city $1.5 billion when interest is factored in.

In June 2001, Vallas announced his resignation. His departure came two weeks after Gery Chico's resignation, the Chicago Board of Education's president. Both of their resignations came soon after several failing standardized testing scores eliminated the improvements to test scores that had been experienced over the previous two years. This loss of progress in test scores had angered Mayor Daley. Vallas's six-year tenure was greater than two-times the average tenure at the time for school superintendents in large U.S. cities.

Many praised Vallas's tenure, crediting him with improving the school district's performance. Martha Woodall of The Philadelphia Inquirer wrote in 2002 that, in Chicago, Vallas attained a reputation of being, a "savvy, hard-working, blunt-speaking manager who insists on doing things his own way". In a 2009 article published in the Peabody Journal of Education, Elizabeth Useem wrote that, as CEO of CPS, Vallas, "developed a reputation for being an energetic leader who could move quickly to carry out a far-reaching program of reform". Among the criticisms detractors had of Vallas's style of leadership in Chicago were characterizations of him as failing to sufficiently collaborate with community groups and showing hostility towards those who gave criticism or questioned his decisions.

=== CEO of the School District of Philadelphia ===
In July 2002, Vallas was appointed CEO of the School District of Philadelphia. His appointment occurred six months after the state took over the school district. Vallas quickly moved to propose a reform agenda modeled after the actions he took in Chicago.

As CEO, he presided over the nation's largest experiment in privatized management of schools, with the management of over 40 schools turned over to outside for-profits, nonprofits, and universities beginning in Fall 2002. A 2007 RAND study of Philadelphia's privatization found that the achievement gains in Philadelphia's privately managed schools were on average no different from district-wide gains, nor were they substantially greater than those of other low-achieving schools in the state. In particular, schools that stayed under district management but received additional resources similar to those managed by for-profit firms showed directly comparable increases in math.

Vallas converted the school district to a K–8 and 9–12 grade structure, eliminating nearly all city middle schools. Vallas oversaw a standardization of the district's curriculum. Vallas also had the district create new after school programs, as well as new Saturday school and summer school programs, which were mostly run by private companies such as The Princeton Review and Kaplan, Inc. As superintendent, Vallas also undertook a program of new school facility construction and renovation of existing facilities. Vallas's tenure saw the establishment of an increased number of privately operated disciplinary schools and alternative schools. International Baccalaureate and Advanced Placement programs were expanded.

Vallas increased the number of International Baccalaureate programs in the city and the number of military academies in the district.

There was a gradual increase in standardized testing scores during Vallas's tenure. However, 11th grade scores remained poor. There was also an increase in schools meeting the Adequate Yearly Progress standards set by No Child Left Behind. Vallas failed to decrease the district's high dropout rate.

Vallas left the job in June 2007 to take a position in Louisiana. After Vallas departed, Thomas Brady served as interim CEO until Arlene Ackerman took office as CEO. Upon Vallas's departure, Vallas was described by Philadelphia magazine as the, "most effective Philadelphia schools chief in a generation". A study published by Harvard's Kennedy School of Government concluded, "the average student at schools managed by for-profit firms learned more in math than would be expected had the schools remained under district management". However, a $73.3 million annual budget deficit had arisen towards the end of his tenure, which proved to be a source of criticism towards Vallas. Vallas's addition of a vast number of new initiatives and programs contributed to the district's budget shortfall. Vallas's five-year tenure was longer than the typical tenure length of school superintendents in U.S. cities.

=== Superintendent Recovery School District of Louisiana ===
Vallas signed a two-year contract (2007–2008) as superintendent of the Recovery School District of Louisiana. He remained head of the Recovery School District through 2011. Vallas greatly increased the system's utilization of charter schools.

=== Superintendent of Bridgeport Public Schools ===
In December 2011, Vallas was hired by the board of education for Bridgeport, Connecticut, to become the interim superintendent of Bridgeport Public Schools, effective January 1, 2012.

In June 2013, Vallas became the permanent superintendent of the Bridgeport Public Schools. In July, Connecticut Superior Court Justice Barbara Bellis ordered Vallas removed from the position after he neglected to complete mandated coursework and certification. The Connecticut Supreme Court overturned the ruling of Bellis and ordered that Vallas be reinstated.

Vallas resigned on November 8, 2013, to run for lieutenant governor of Illinois.

== Chicago State University ==
In January 2017, Governor of Illinois Bruce Rauner appointed Vallas to a vacant seat on the board of trustees of Chicago State University. Rauner's appointment of Vallas surprised some, as they had previously been political rivals. Rauner recommended that Vallas be made board chairman, despite the board having already elected a chairman months earlier. Instead, Vallas was made board secretary. Weeks after the appointment, Rauner recommended that Vallas be a crisis manager for the university. This was not done.

After the university announced its intent to hire a new interim president and create and fill the position of chief administrative officer, Rauner recommended Vallas as his choice to serve as the interim president of Chicago State University. The board allowed Vallas to apply for the two positions, but only once he stepped down from his position on their board. Objections were raised to the prospect of Vallas serving as president, with criticisms including objections to Rauner's level of involvement in choosing Vallas and other criticism opposing appointing Vallas, who is white, to lead a largely African-American university. In April, the university's board of trustees chose to appoint Rachel Lindsey as interim president, and appointed Vallas to serve as chief administrative officer. He served in the position during 2017 and 2018. In late-January 2018, after it became known that Vallas intended to leave the job to run for mayor of Chicago, the university's board dismissed him and expressed anger towards him, accusing him of using his position at the university to bolster his political prospects. Vallas had served only half the time his contract with the university specified.

== Other work in education ==
In 2002, before being appointed CEO of Philadelphia's school district, Vallas was one of several applicants seeking appointment as Illinois superintendent of education.

While working as superintendent in New Orleans, Vallas advised efforts to rebuild Haiti's school system following the 2010 earthquake in Haiti. His work in Haiti led actor Sean Penn to request that Vallas join his J/P Haitian Relief Foundation CORE's board of directors, which Vallas accepted. Vallas also worked in post-earthquake school matters in Chile. His work in Chile and Haiti ultimately lasted several years.

After the 2014 gubernatorial election, Vallas worked with the Bronner Group and the United States Department of Justice to develop a prison education program. He continued to work as a Bronner Group consultant.

Paul Vallas is the co-chair of the Advisory Board for the National Education Support Network. According to them, Vallas was the lead consultant on "a plan to create, finance and operationalize the first publicly funded school system in Haiti". On Thursday, September 9, 2021, "The Arkansas Board of Education ... gave final approval to four open-enrollment charter schools to begin operations in 2022 and 2023." Vallas was "one of the chief planners" for the Arkansas Military and First Responders Academy in Pulaski County, Arkansas. That school was proposed to the Arkansas Department of Education on March 31, 2020, by Rick W. Mills of the National Education Support Network, with a smaller enrollment size than it would eventually be planned to accept, with 800 students being enrolled as opposed to the intended cap of 600 students.

== Political career ==
=== 2002 campaign for governor of Illinois ===
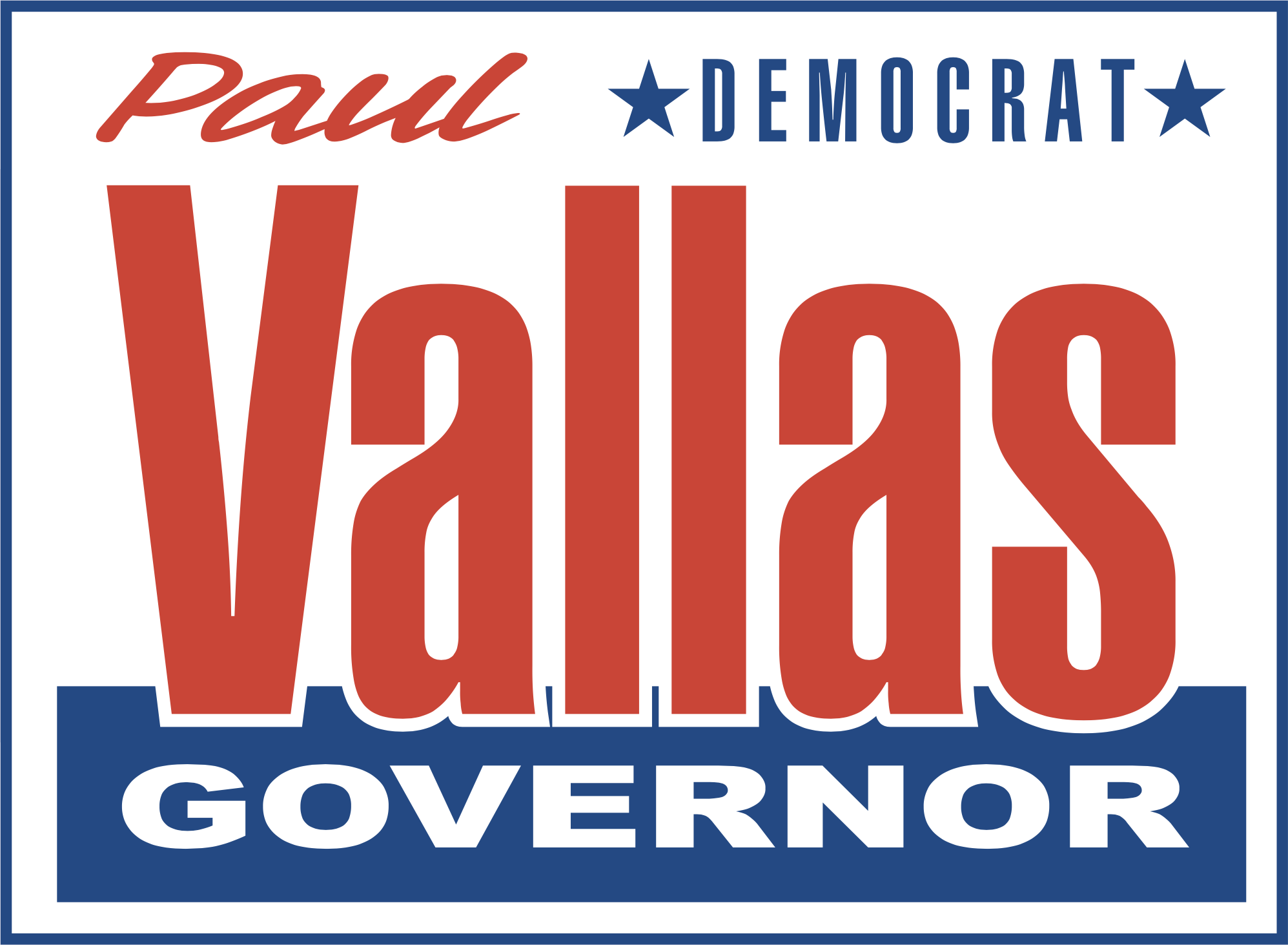
Logo of Vallas's 2002 gubernatorial campaign

Following his tenure at CPS, Vallas ran for governor of Illinois as a Democrat. Vallas placed second in the Democratic primary in March 2002, losing narrowly to then-U.S. Congressman Rod Blagojevich and finishing ahead of former state attorney general Roland Burris.

Former congressman Glenn Poshard, a conservative Democrat, campaigned on behalf of Vallas. Before launching his gubernatorial campaign, Vallas had been asked by Poshard, who had considered running himself, to run in the Democratic lieutenant gubernatorial primary as Poshard's co-endorsed candidate. Vallas wasn't interested in running for lieutenant governor. Months later, Vallas reflected on this decision by asking, "does anyone really know what the lieutenant governor does?" In addition to Poshard's support, Vallas also received the endorsements of the editorial boards of the Chicago Tribune and the St. Louis Post-Dispatch.

The general chairman of Vallas's campaign was Christopher G. Kennedy. Brendan Reilly served as the campaign's communications director.

=== 2010 prospective candidacies ===
During his tenure as superintendent in Louisiana, he floated the possibility of running for office back in Illinois, but ultimately did not pursue either race he considered. On April 28, 2008 he appeared before the City Club of Chicago and on Chicago news shows discussing a possible run for governor in 2010. In February 2009, Vallas gave an interview to Carol Marin in the Chicago Sun-Times and stated that he planned to return to Cook County, Illinois in 2009 and run as a Republican for president of the Cook County Board of Commissioners in the 2010 race. Vallas went as far as forming an exploratory committee for such a prospective candidacy. On June 11, 2009, Vallas announced that he would not be a candidate for president of the Cook County Board of Commissioners in 2010. Vallas stated that he could not "begin a political campaign while trying to finish what he started—rebuild the school system there in the aftermath of Hurricane Katrina".

=== 2014 campaign for Illinois lieutenant governor ===
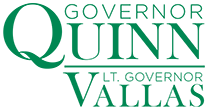
Quinn-Vallas 2014 campaign logo

In November 2013, Illinois Governor Pat Quinn tapped Vallas to be his running mate in the 2014 election after incumbent lieutenant governor Sheila Simon chose to run for comptroller instead of seeking reelection. In his announcement, Quinn praised Vallas saying "he's never been shy about fighting for education, reform and opportunities for working people". Quinn's choice of Vallas was seen as surprising by many, including U.S. Senator Dick Durbin, who nonetheless called Vallas his friend. During the campaign, Vallas played the role of the campaign's "attack dog", heavily criticizing Bruce Rauner.

Quinn and Vallas lost the election to the Republican ticket of Bruce Rauner and Evelyn Sanguinetti. During Vallas's 2023 mayoral campaign, Quinn endorsed U.S. Representative Chuy García's campaign over his campaign at first, however eventually endorsed Vallas in the run-off election.

In April 2023, at a rally for Brandon Johnson's mayoral campaign, Illinois State Representative Theresa Mah and Cook County Commissioner Josina Morita, who are both of Chinese-American ancestry and who both worked as interns for Quinn 2014's campaign, claimed to a crowd that, "every single weekend, at a campaign event or a parade, [Vallas] would confuse us", thereby alleging that Vallas had had difficulty telling the two Asian-American interns apart.

=== 2019 Chicago mayoral candidacy ===
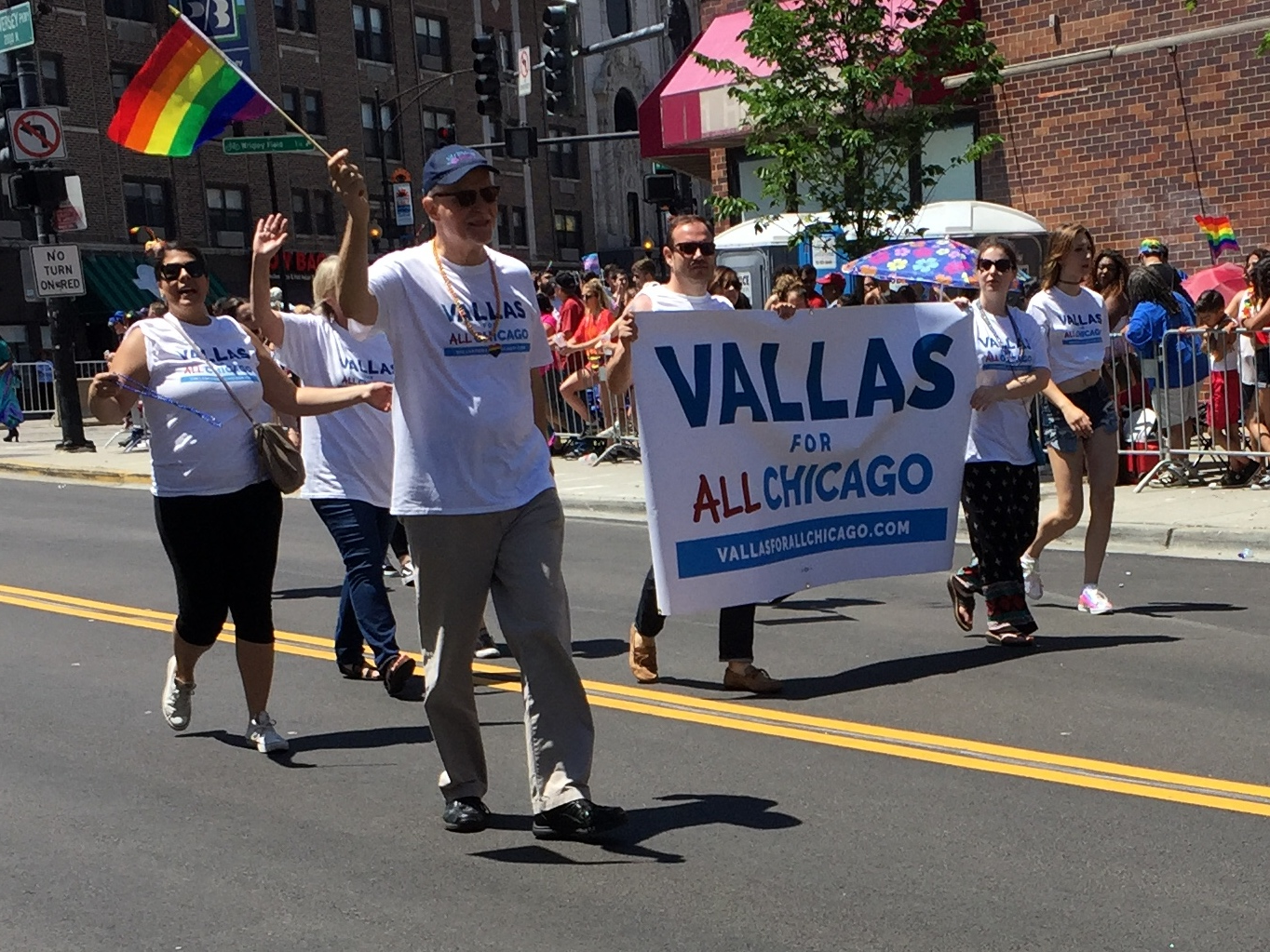
Vallas marching in the 2019 Chicago Pride Parade

In March 2018, Vallas formally filed to become a candidate in the 2019 Chicago mayoral election.

When he entered the race, Vallas was seen as a potentially strong opponent to incumbent Rahm Emanuel, seeking reelection at the time. In September, Emanuel dropped out of the race, and the field for mayor grew, with many more high-profile candidates entering the race. After Emanuel withdrew his planned candidacy, a large number of prominent political figures adjoined the field running for mayor of Chicago. Among the contenders to enter the race at this point was Gery Chico, Vallas's one-time political ally with whom he had previously overseen the Chicago Public Schools. Vallas had previously endorsed Chico for mayor in 2011. Despite this history, Vallas did not hesitate to criticize Chico as a mayoral opponent.

Vallas staked a large part of his candidacy on his record as head of Chicago Public Schools, arguing that he helped to turn around the school system and that his leadership left the system in better shape. Vallas claimed that the Chicago Public Schools were healthier under his leadership than they were in 2019. PolitiFact rated this claim as "mostly true".

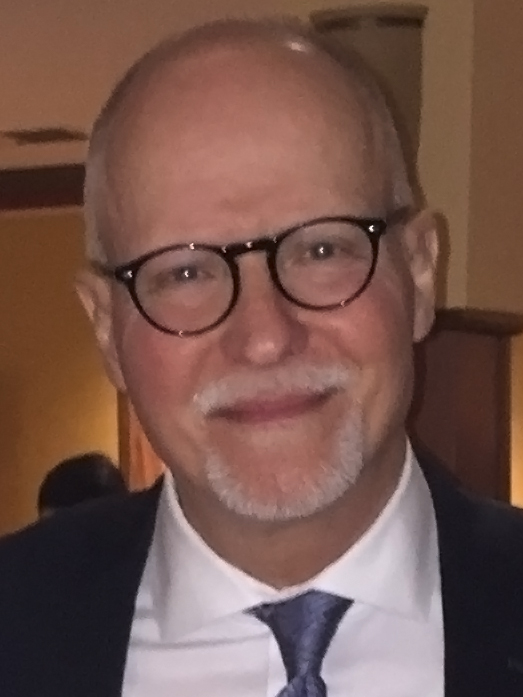
Vallas in December 2018

As a candidate, Vallas pledged to combat political corruption in Chicago's City Hall.

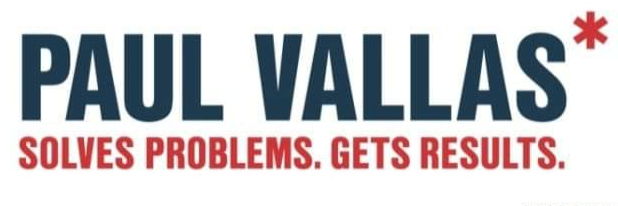
Vallas's campaign logos for his 2019 mayoral bid

Vallas was endorsed by Deborah Lynch, former president of the Chicago Teachers Union. Rocky Wirtz, chairman of the Chicago Blackhawks, was a major campaign donor to Vallas. Vallas also received a rare mayoral endorsement from the Chicago Republican Party. Chicago Republican Party Chair Chris Cleveland called Vallas the "lesser of 13 evils". Vallas welcomed the endorsement, commenting, "This is a non-partisan election and I'm running for mayor to represent all Chicagoans. I've traveled to every ward and met with every constituency. The crisis that Chicago faces affects all citizens. I thank the Republican committee for their confidence in my candidacy." Former governor Bruce Rauner, a Republican, commented in an interview that, of those running, Vallas, "might make the best mayor".

Vallas's campaign sent unsolicited text messages. The campaign employed North Carolina–based firm Link2Tek to accomplish this. In mid-January 2019, a class-action lawsuit was filed against the Vallas campaign, alleging that it had violated the Telephone Consumer Protection Act of 1991, which prohibits calling or texting a person using an automatic telephone dialing system without their consent. Vallas accused the lawsuit of being, "a dirty trick" orchestrated by the "political machine". A motion by Link2Tek's (a co-defendant in the lawsuit) to dismiss the lawsuit was denied in August 2020.

As the election came close, despite the race being highly competitive, outlets such as The Wall Street Journal and Chicago magazine did not consider Vallas among the top contenders to advance to a likely runoff election. Ultimately, in the first round of the election, Vallas placed ninth out of fourteen candidates, receiving 30,236 votes (5.43% of the votes cast). Failing to advance to the runoff, Vallas endorsed Lori Lightfoot.

=== 2023 Chicago mayoral candidacy ===
==== First round ====
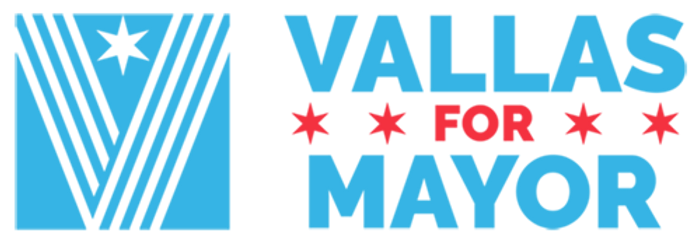
Vallas's 2023 mayoral campaign logo

Vallas (center) speaking at a mayoral candidate forum at UIC, also featuring opponents Sophia King, Kam Buckner, Lori Lightfoot, Chuy García

In June 2022, Vallas announced his candidacy for mayor again in the 2023 election, challenging incumbent Mayor Lori Lightfoot. Vallas was a critic of the Lightfoot administration over what he characterized as her lack of accountability amidst a rise in crime and violence in the city.

Vallas's campaign staff included a number of nationally prominent consultants, including Joe Trippi, who served as senior strategist and media advisor, and pollster Mark Mellman.

Vallas centered his candidacy on the issue of crime. He promised that he would extend both the length of the school day and the school year. He also pledged that he would give parents "100% choice" over what schools their children attend.

The month that he launched his campaign, Vallas appeared at a fundraising event for Awake IL, a political not-for-profit that had been criticized for its anti-LGBTQ rhetoric. In August 2022, Vallas condemned the group saying "I am a lifelong Democrat who has spent my entire adult life fighting hateful rhetorical and hateful groups." His claim of being a "lifelong Democrat" was called into question by some, who pointed to campaign contributions from prominent Republican donor Michael Keiser, and to Chicago Board of Elections records listing Vallas as having voted in the 2022 Republican Party primary election. Reporter Gregory Pratt later claimed that the Chicago Board of Elections had said that Vallas had not voted in the Republican primary and that the records that showed him as having done so were due to a "coding error".

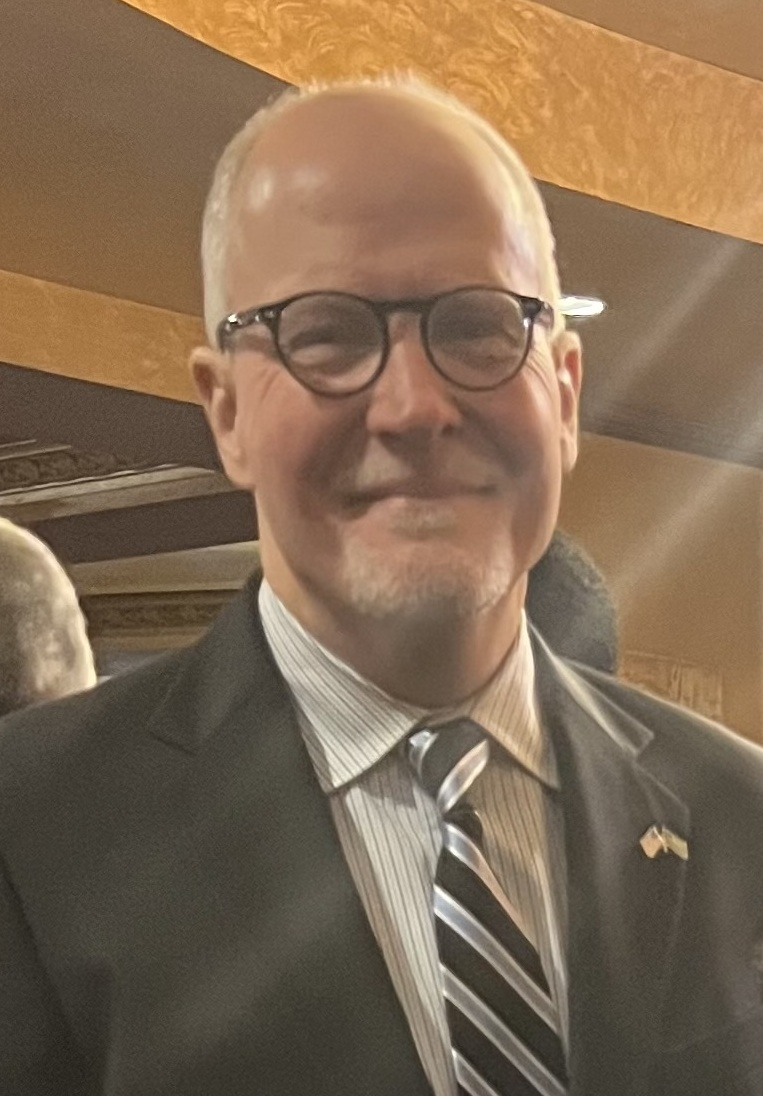
Vallas in December 2022

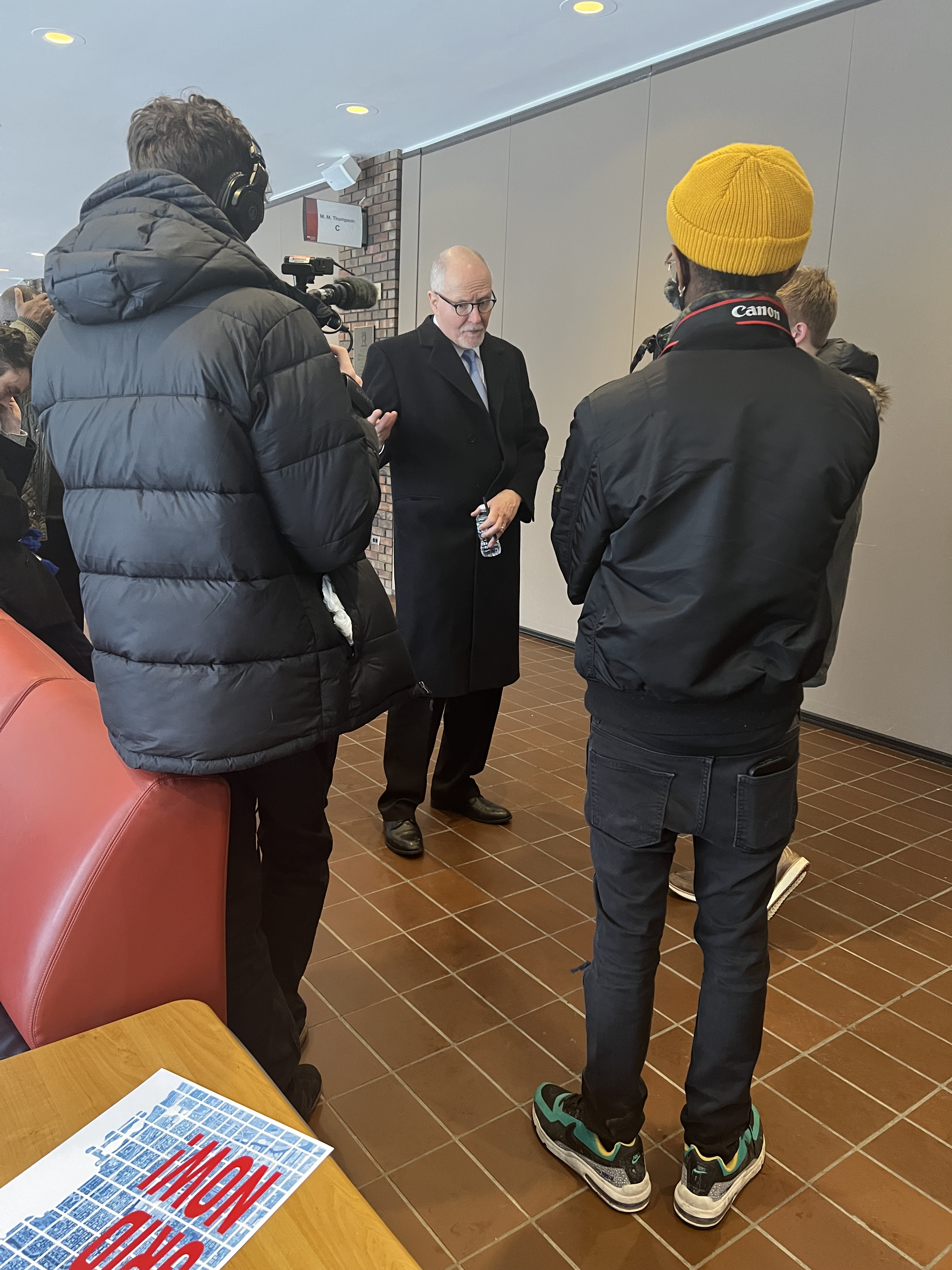
Vallas speaking to the media in January 2023

Vallas was the only white, non-Hispanic candidate on the ballot in the 2023 mayoral election. Seven of the other candidates were Black, while one was Latino. Edward Robert McClelland of Chicago magazine remarked that his being the sole White candidate meant that, unlike in the 2019 mayoral election, "[Vallas] doesn't have to share that constituency with Bill Daley, Jerry Joyce, or Garry McCarthy." McClelland also regarded Vallas to be running as a police-friendly candidate. Similarly, Justin Kaufman of Axios opined that Vallas is "the candidate most likely to court the police and firefighter vote". Vallas received the endorsement of Chicago's Fraternal Order of Police (FOP) lodge, which serves as the city's police union.

In addition to being endorsed by the Fraternal Order of Police, Vallas was also endorsed in the election's first round by International Union of Elevator Constructors Local 2 and the editorial boards of both the Chicago Tribune and The Gazette. Also endorsing Vallas were Chicago aldermen Brian K. Hopkins Anthony Napolitano, Brendan Reilly, and Tom Tunney.

Vallas was often viewed as being either a conservative or politically moderate candidate, especially when compared to other candidates in the election. Vallas also received significant campaign donations from sources considered politically conservative and aligned with the Republican Party. Vallas was criticized by opponents for holding perceived conservative political positions, in particular allegedly opposing abortion rights. Other candidates in the 2023 race pointed to a 2009 interview in which he declared himself "more of a Republican than a Democrat because, fundamentally, I oppose abortion" as well as stating that "If I were to run for office again, I would run as a Republican" and that he would "probably register as a Republican in the next primary". Nonetheless, in the same interview Vallas had described himself as "personally pro-choice". Vallas disputed the anti-abortion characterization and asserted that his words were taken out of context. Vallas pointed to past endorsements from the pro-choice groups Planned Parenthood and Personal PAC during his 2002 gubernatorial and 2014 lieutenant gubernatorial campaigns.

By early February, polls showed Vallas to be among the front-runners. Around the same time, Vallas received the endorsement of the editorial board of the Chicago Tribune. Soon after, Vallas faced allegations that his permanent residence was actually in Palos Heights, Illinois rather than Chicago after an investigative report by WTTW-TV based upon reported tax filings. This raised questions regarding Vallas's legal eligibility to hold the office of mayor of Chicago. Vallas responded that he lived in Chicago, while his wife lived in Palos Heights to care for her elderly parents. On February 23, the Chicago Tribune's news bureau released a report on an investigation of Vallas's Twitter account, showing that it had liked several tweets that "used racist language, supported controversial police tactics like 'stop-and-frisk' or insulted the mayor in personal terms". Vallas denied liking the tweets and claimed that his account had been hacked.

On February 28, 2023, Vallas won the plurality in the first round of the election, receiving 32.91% of the vote, causing a runoff election where he would face runner-up Brandon Johnson. Among the areas where Vallas saw his greatest levels of support was the city's downtown, as well as parts of the city's northwest and southwest sides that had large working-class White populations. Some analysts believe that Vallas benefited greatly from staking out a "tough-on-crime" stance amid widespread concerns among Chicagoans about crime.

==== Runoff ====
Four candidates eliminated in the first round endorsed Vallas in the runoff: businessman Willie Wilson, Alderman Roderick Sawyer, Alderman Sophia King, and activist Ja'Mal Green. In addition to the four incumbent aldermen who had endorsed Vallas ahead of the first round of the election, Vallas received the endorsements of many more incumbent aldermen (including the aforementioned King and Sawyer). A number of these came from several "pro-police" Hispanic ward aldermen.

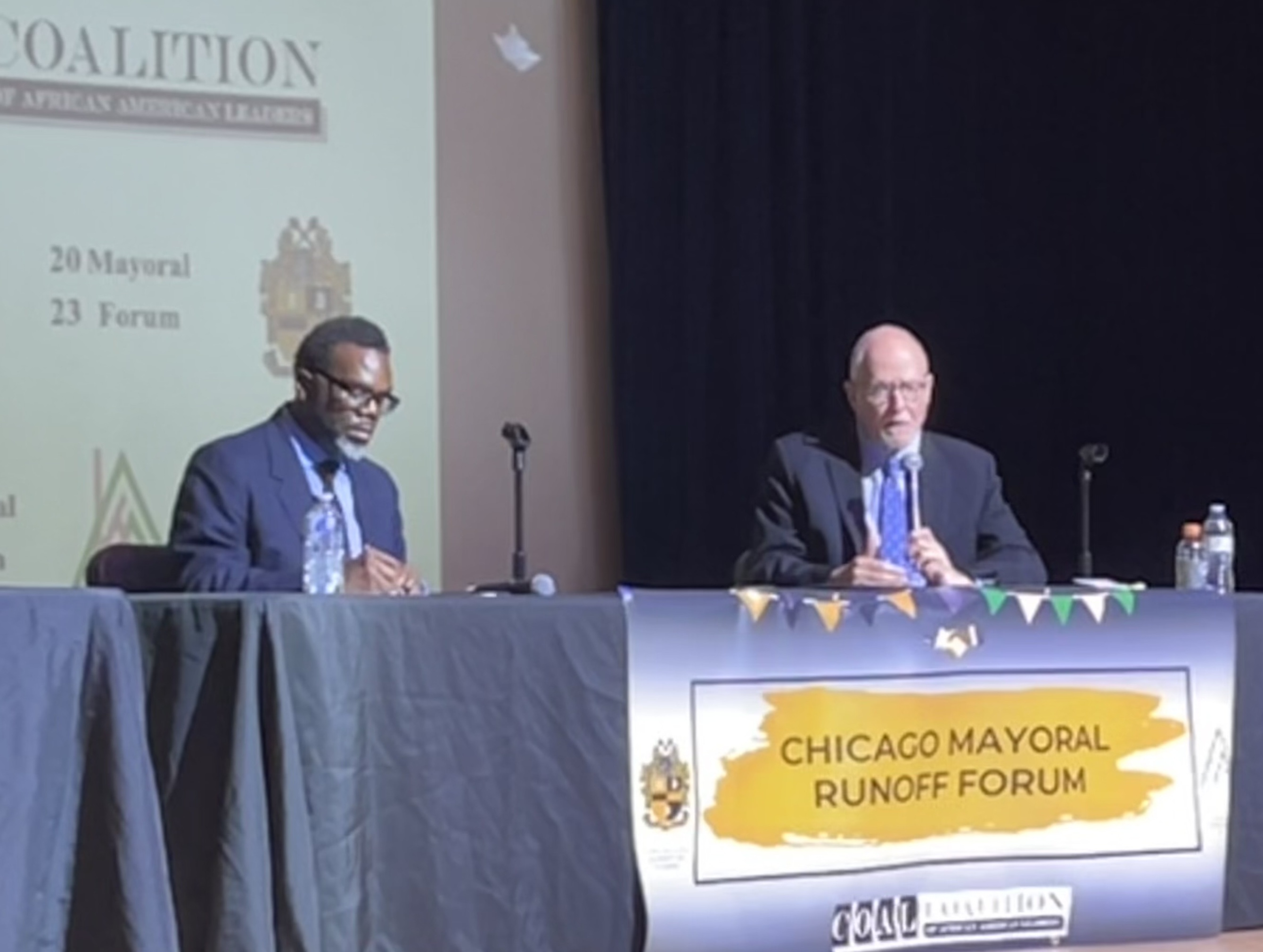
Vallas alongside Brandon Johnson at a runoff mayoral forum at Kenwood Academy in March 2023

Some individuals and unions that had endorsed Lightfoot in the first round endorsed Vallas in the runoff. These include the International Association of Bridge, Structural, Ornamental and Reinforcing Iron Workers Chicago District Council, Plumbers Local 130 (a United Association affiliate), former congressman Bobby Rush, Cook County Board of Review member and former alderman George Cardenas. and aldermen Walter Burnett Jr., Michelle A. Harris, and Emma Mitts. Vallas was also endorsed by Alderman Raymond Lopez (a first-round Willie Wilson supporter who had briefly run for mayor himself), Alderman David H. Moore (a first-round Sophia King supporter), and the International Union of Operating Engineers Local 150 (which had endorsed García in the first round).

Other unions, business associations, and organizations that endorsed Vallas in the runoff were International Brotherhood of Electrical Workers Locals 9 and 134, International Brotherhood of Teamsters JC25, International Union of Operating Engineers Local 399, Laborers' International Union of North America Chicago District Council, the Chicagoland Chamber of Commerce, the Illinois Hotel and Lodging Association, the Illinois Manufacturers' Association, and the Armenian National Committee of America. Other notable figures to endorse Vallas after he advanced to the runoff include former Illinois Secretary of State Jesse White, former president of the Illinois Senate Emil Jones, and conservative hedge fund manager Ken Griffin. Two-time mayoral candidate and former chair of the Illinois State Board of Education Gery Chico, who had worked alongside Vallas when they were leaders of the Chicago Public Schools, also endorsed him.

Chicago Fraternal Order of Police union president John Catanzara stated in an interview with The New York Times that there would be "blood in the streets" if Brandon Johnson was elected. Vallas harshly criticized the remarks as "absolutely irresponsible" and said "they have no place in this campaign."

Vallas accused Johnson of lacking "substance" and of lacking a significant political record. Vallas also campaigned on lowering crime, while characterizing Johnson as wanting to "defund the police".

Continuing the charge prominently led by Lightfoot and García in the first round of the election, Johnson characterized Vallas as a Republican masquerading as a Democrat. Johnson criticized Vallas for ties to Republican Party organizations and figures and to conservative causes. In the first runoff debate, Johnson remarked "Chicago cannot afford Republicans like Paul Vallas", pointing to 2009 remarks in which Vallas had expressed opposition to abortion rights and declared himself "more of a Republican than a Democrat". In response to this line of criticism, Vallas continued to proclaim himself a "lifelong Democrat", citing his previous 2002 gubernatorial and 2014 lieutenant gubernatorial campaigns as a Democrat. Johnson also attacked Vallas as having hurt Chicago Public Schools' finances during his tenure as CEO.

Vallas significantly out-fundraised Johnson, raising $18 million. Vallas's campaign spent almost $17 million, outspending Johnson by a ratio of nearly 2-to-1.

After Johnson was projected to have defeated him, Vallas conceded.

After the election, Vallas filed a lawsuit accusing Chimaobi Enyia (the former head of the Illinois Liquor Control Commission and brother of 2019 Chicago mayoral candidate Amara Enyia) of defrauding the campaign of $680,000. The lawsuit claimed that the campaign had given the money to Enyia for Black voter outreach efforts.

== Other activities ==
In 2020, Vallas served as an unpaid consultant to Chicago's Fraternal Order of Police police union during contract negotiations with the city of Chicago, playing a role in the negotiations. The Union's head, John Catanzara, touted Vallas's presence at negotiation with assisting the police union's bargaining.

== Political stances ==
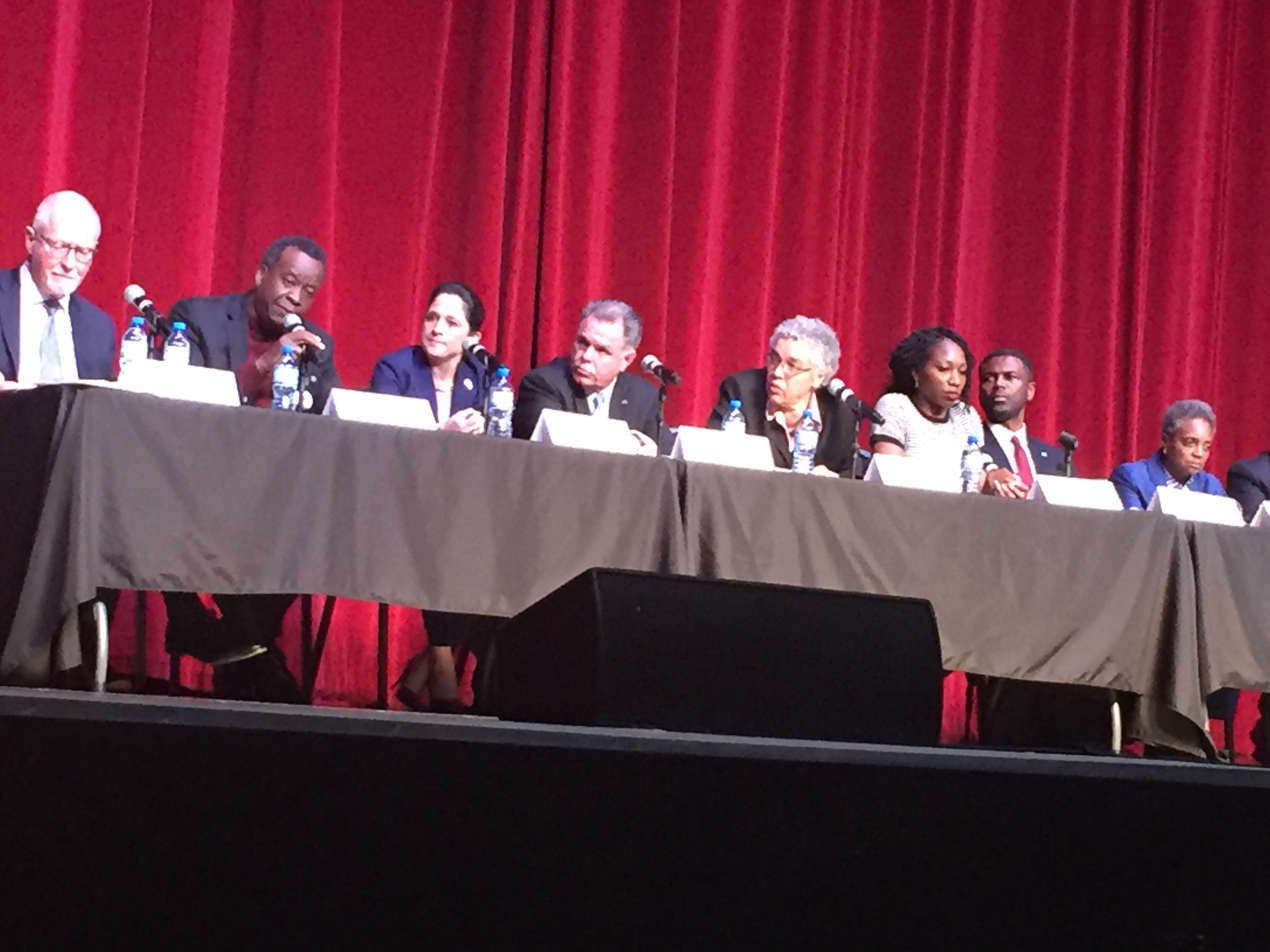
Vallas (furthest left) at a mayoral forum during the 2019 mayoral election in December 2018, also featuring (L–R) Willie Wilson, Susana Mendoza, Garry McCarthy, Toni Preckwinkle, Amara Enyia, LaShawn K. Ford, Lori Lightfoot

During his 2002 gubernatorial campaign, Vallas opposed the concealed carry of firearms and was in favor of banning semi-automatic firearms. He supported a plan by Mayor Daley to reconfigure O'Hare International Airport's runways and to add more runways to the airport. He also supported constructing a new airport in Chicago's southern suburbs. Vallas also opposed a proposed casino in Rosemont, Illinois, citing that gambling should only be permitted to advance economic development. He also opposed raising the state income tax, claiming it would be wrong amid an economic downturn.

During his 2002 gubernatorial campaign and much of his political career, Vallas has positioned himself as supportive of abortion rights. In a 2009 interview, Vallas said he opposed abortion but also declared himself to be "personally pro-choice".

During his 2002 gubernatorial campaign, Vallas opposed using public subsidies to renovate Soldier Field (a stadium in Chicago). He also opposed the proposed renovation design and was against the possible selling of naming rights for the stadium. During his 2023 mayoral campaign, Vallas stated that he believed it was too late to persuade the Chicago Bears football team to remain at Soldier Field amid plans by the Bears to build a new stadium in Arlington Heights, Illinois. He also opposed a $2.2 billion renovation of the stadium floated by Mayor Lightfoot.

In his 2023 mayoral campaign, Vallas campaigned as "tough-on-crime".

== Personal life ==
Vallas married his wife, Sharon Vallas, in 1984. They have three children, Gus, Mark, and Paul Jr. In 2018, Vallas's son Mark died as a result of opioid abuse.

In March 2022, another of Vallas's sons, Gus, who worked as a police officer for the San Antonio Police Department, was one of three officers involved in the fatal shooting of Kevin Johnson, a black man who was wanted on felony warrants and allegedly evading arrest on a bike. Gus and the two other officers were placed on administrative duty during the investigation. The news broke in February 2023 during that year's mayoral election. The Vallas campaign released a statement confirming Gus's involvement in the shooting, saying that the complete investigation found him to have not been "engaged in any violations of policy or procedure" and that he had been returned to "full duty".

== Electoral history ==
2002 Illinois gubernatorial Democratic primary
Party	Candidate	Votes	%
Democratic	Rod Blagojevich	457,197	36.50%
Democratic	Paul Vallas	431,728	34.47%
Democratic	Roland Burris	363,591	29.03%
Total votes		1,252,516	100.00%

2014 Illinois gubernatorial election
Party	Candidate	Votes	%
Republican	Bruce Rauner / Evelyn Sanguinetti	1,823,627	50.27%
Democratic	Pat Quinn (incumbent) / Paul Vallas	1,681,343	46.35%
Libertarian	Chad Grimm / Alex Cummings	121,534	3.35%
Write-in		1,186	0.03%
Total votes		3,627,690	100.00%

2019 Chicago mayoral election
Candidate	General election		Runoff election	
Candidate	Votes	%	Votes	%
Lori Lightfoot	97,667	17.54	386,039	73.70
Toni Preckwinkle	89,343	16.04	137,765	26.30
William Daley	82,294	14.78		
Willie Wilson	59,072	10.61		
Susana Mendoza	50,373	9.05		
Amara Enyia	44,589	8.00		
Jerry Joyce	40,099	7.20		
Gery Chico	34,521	6.20		
Paul Vallas	30,236	5.43		
Garry McCarthy	14,784	2.66		
La Shawn K. Ford	5,606	1.01		
Robert "Bob" Fioretti	4,302	0.77		
John Kolzar	2,349	0.42		
Neal Sales-Griffin	1,523	0.27		
Write-ins	86	0.02		
Total	556,844	100	523,804	100

2023 Chicago mayoral election
Candidate	General election		Runoff election	
Candidate	Votes	%	Votes	%
Brandon Johnson	122,093	21.63	319,481	52.16
Paul Vallas	185,743	32.90	293,033	47.84
Lori Lightfoot (incumbent)	94,890	16.81		
Chuy García	77,222	13.68		
Willie Wilson	51,567	9.13		
Ja'Mal Green	12,257	2.17		
Kam Buckner	11,092	1.96		
Sophia King	7,191	1.27		
Roderick Sawyer	2,440	0.43		
Write-ins	29	0.00		
Total	564,524	100.00	612,514	100.00

== Works authored ==
Op-eds

- "Chicago's road to financial calamity" (published October 20, 2021, in Crain's Chicago Business)
- "The city and Cook County government have surrendered their obligation to keep us safe" (published February 15, 2022, in the Chicago Tribune)
- Some fast, necessary solutions that would improve the Chicago Police Department and reduce violent crime" (published March 9, 2022, in the Chicago Tribune)
- "It will take proactive policing to defend downtown Chicago" (published March 9, 2022, in the Chicago Tribune)
- "Let's put an end to Chicago leaders' fuzzy budgeting math with a council budget office" (published March 9, 2022, in the Chicago Tribune)
- "By failing to extend the Invest in Kids Act, Illinois is moving to eradicate parental choice" (published June 2, 2023, in the Chicago Tribune)

Educational offices
Preceded by Argie Johnson as Superintendent of Chicago Public Schools	CEO of Chicago Public Schools; 1995–2001	Succeeded by Arne Duncan
Preceded by Paul R. Goldsmith as interim Chief Executive Officer	School District of Philadelphia Superintendent as Chief Executive Officer; 2002–2007	Succeeded by Arlene C. Ackerman as Chief Executive Officer
Party political offices
Preceded by Sheila Simon	Democratic nominee for Lieutenant Governor of Illinois; 2014	Succeeded by Juliana Stratton
