= 2014 United States Senate election in Illinois =

- November 4, 2014
- Turnout: 48.16%
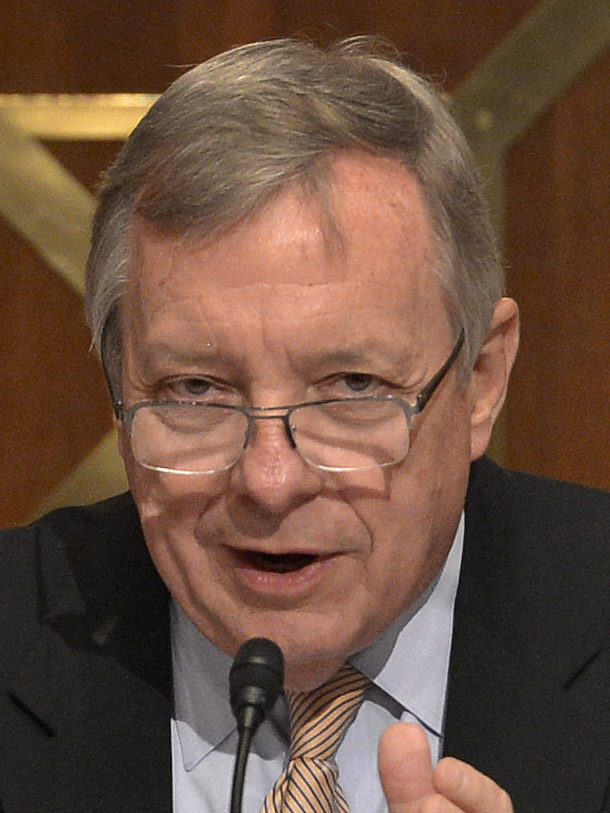

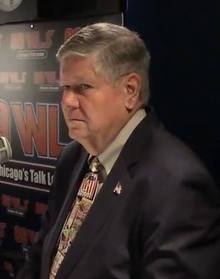
Nominee	Dick Durbin	Jim Oberweis
Party	Democratic	Republican
Popular vote	1,929,637	1,538,522
Percentage	53.55%	42.69%
- Durbin: 40–50% 50–60% 60–70% 70–80% 80–90% >90% Oberweis: 30–40% 40–50% 50–60% 60–70% 70–80% 80–90% Tie: 40–50% No data
U.S. senator before election
Dick Durbin
Democratic
Elected U.S. Senator
Dick Durbin
Democratic

The 2014 United States Senate election in Illinois took place on November 4, 2014, to elect a member of the United States Senate to represent the State of Illinois, concurrently with the election of the governor of Illinois, as well as other elections to the United States Senate in other states, elections to the United States House of Representatives, and various state and local elections.

Incumbent Democratic U.S. Senator and Senate Majority Whip Dick Durbin ran for re-election to a fourth term. He was unopposed in the Democratic primary. The Republicans nominated state senator and perennial candidate for higher office Jim Oberweis.

Durbin defeated Oberweis and Libertarian Sharon Hansen with 53.5% of the vote, the smallest vote total of any of his Senate elections.

== Background ==
Dick Durbin was first elected to the Senate in 1996, and was re-elected by increasingly larger margins in 2002 and 2008. He has served as Senate Majority Whip since 2007 and sought a fourth term in office.

For the primary election, turnout was 15.77%, with 1,183,429 votes cast. For the general election, turnout was 48.16%, with 3,603,519 votes cast.

== Democratic primary ==
=== Candidates ===
==== Declared ====
- Dick Durbin, incumbent U.S. senator

==== Results ====
Democratic primary results
Party	Candidate	Votes	%
Democratic	Dick Durbin (incumbent)	429,041	100.00%
Total votes		429,041	100.00%

== Republican primary ==
=== Candidates ===
==== Declared ====
- Jim Oberweis, state senator, candidate for the U.S. Senate in 2002 and 2004, candidate for governor in 2006, and nominee for IL-14 in 2008 special and 2008 general election
- Doug Truax, businessman

==== Removed ====
- Armen Alvarez, Multicultural Membership Development Manager of the Parent-Teacher Association (removed from the ballot)
- William Lee, blogger (removed from the ballot)

==== Declined ====
- Chad Koppie, Kane County Regional Board of Schools trustee, candidate for the U.S. Senate in 1992, 1996 and 2008 and candidate for governor in 1998
- Joe Walsh, conservative radio talk show host and former U.S. representative

=== Endorsements ===
Doug Truax

Individuals

- Newt Gingrich, former United States speaker of the House of Representatives
- Aaron Schock, U.S. representative (R-IL)
- John Shimkus, U.S. representative (R-IL)

Newspapers'

- Chicago Tribune

=== Polling ===
Poll source	Date(s) administered	Sample size	Margin of error	Jim Oberweis	Doug Truax	Other	Undecided
Market Shares Corp.	February 5–8, 2014	600	± 4%	52%	15%	2%	32%

Hypothetical polling

Poll source	Date(s) administered	Sample size	Margin of error	Chad Koppie	William Lee	Jim Oberweis	Joe Ruiz	Doug Truax	Other	Undecided
Public Policy Polling	November 22–25, 2013	375	± 5.1%	3%	4%	42%	1%	7%	—	42%

==== Results ====
Results by county Oberweis: 50–60%; 60–70%; 70–80%; Truax: 50–60%

Republican primary results
Party	Candidate	Votes	%
Republican	Jim Oberweis	423,097	56.08%
Republican	Doug Truax	331,237	43.91%
Republican	Write-in	54	<0.01%
Total votes		754,388	100.00%

== Independents and third party ==
=== Candidates ===
==== Declared ====
- Sharon Hansen (Libertarian)
- Fuji Shioura, write-in candidate (Independent)

==== Removed from the ballot ====
- Chad Koppie (Constitution)
- Omar Lopez (Green)

== General election ==
=== Fundraising ===
Campaign Finance Reports through November 24, 2014
Candidate	Raised	Spent
Dick Durbin	$10,309,888	$12,453,951
Jim Oberweis	$2,388,389	$2,416,774
Sharon Hansen	$2,420	$2,367
Source: OpenSecrets

=== Debates ===
- Complete video of debate, October 22, 2014

=== Predictions ===
Source	Ranking	As of
The Cook Political Report	Solid D	November 3, 2014
Sabato's Crystal Ball	Safe D	November 3, 2014
Rothenberg Political Report	Safe D	November 3, 2014
Real Clear Politics	Likely D	November 3, 2014

=== Polling ===
Poll source	Date(s) administered	Sample size	Margin of error	Dick Durbin (D)	Jim Oberweis (R)	Other	Undecided
We Ask America	September 24, 2013	1,434	± 2.86%	50%	39%	—	11%
Public Policy Polling	November 22–25, 2013	557	± 4.2%	51%	36%	—	12%
Rasmussen Reports	April 9–10, 2014	750	± 4%	51%	37%	3%	10%
We Ask America	June 12, 2014	1,116	± 2.93%	52%	39%	—	9%
CBS News/NYT/YouGov	July 5–24, 2014	5,324	± 2.1%	48%	41%	1%	11%
We Ask America	July 30, 2014	1,049	± 3.04%	53%	38%	—	9%
Gravis Marketing	August 4–5, 2014	567	± 4%	48%	38%	—	14%
Harper Polling*	August 25–27, 2014	1,340	± 2.68%	44%	38%	8%	10%
We Ask America	August 27, 2014	1,054	± 3.02%	48%	41%	4%	8%
CBS News/NYT/YouGov	August 18 – September 2, 2014	4,363	± 3%	50%	38%	1%	10%
We Ask America	September 4, 2014	1,014	± 3.08%	49%	39%	4%	8%
Chicago Tribune	September 3–12, 2014	800	± 3.5%	55%	32%	5%	7%
Rasmussen Reports	September 24–25, 2014	750	± 4%	51%	37%	4%	8%
CBS News/NYT/YouGov	September 20 – October 1, 2014	3,955	± 2%	51%	39%	0%	9%
We Ask America	October 7, 2014	1,086	± 2.98%	51%	38%	4%	6%
UIS Survey Research	October 2–8, 2014	723	± 3.7%	50%	35%	1%	14%
Southern Illinois University	September 23 – October 15, 2014	691 LV	± 3.7%	47%	37%	0%	12%
Southern Illinois University	September 23 – October 15, 2014	1,006 RV	± 3%	49%	32%	0%	14%
APC Research	October 16–21, 2014	800	± 3.5%	50%	36%	7%	6%
CBS News/NYT/YouGov	October 16–23, 2014	3,519	± 3%	52%	39%	1%	9%
McKeon & Associates	October 28, 2014	823	± 3.9%	49%	39%	4%	8%
Public Policy Polling	November 1–2, 2014	1,064	± 3%	51%	41%	4%	4%
Public Policy Polling	November 1–2, 2014	1,064	± 3%	52%	44%	—	4%

Hypothetical polling

Poll source	Date(s) administered	Sample size	Margin of error	Dick Durbin (D)	Bob Dold (R)	Other	Undecided
Public Policy Polling	November 26–28, 2012	500	± 4.4%	54%	33%	—	13%

Poll source	Date(s) administered	Sample size	Margin of error	Dick Durbin (D)	Patrick Hughes (R)	Other	Undecided
Public Policy Polling	November 26–28, 2012	500	± 4.4%	53%	31%	—	16%

Poll source	Date(s) administered	Sample size	Margin of error	Dick Durbin (D)	Chad Koppie (R)	Other	Undecided
Public Policy Polling	November 22–25, 2013	557	± 4.2%	52%	35%	—	13%

Poll source	Date(s) administered	Sample size	Margin of error	Dick Durbin (D)	Doug Truax (R)	Other	Undecided
Public Policy Polling	November 22–25, 2013	557	± 4.2%	51%	33%	—	16%

Poll source	Date(s) administered	Sample size	Margin of error	Dick Durbin (D)	Joe Walsh (R)	Other	Undecided
Public Policy Polling	November 26–28, 2012	500	± 4.4%	54%	29%	—	17%

Poll source	Date(s) administered	Sample size	Margin of error	Dick Durbin (D)	Generic Republican	Other	Undecided
Public Policy Polling	November 26–28, 2012	500	± 4.4%	52%	38%	—	10%

- * Internal poll for the Jim Oberweis campaign.

=== Results ===
Durbin won the election, despite winning only 14 of Illinois' 102 counties.

United States Senate election in Illinois, 2014
Party	Candidate	Votes	%	±%
Democratic	Dick Durbin (incumbent)	1,929,637	53.55%	−14.29%
Republican	Jim Oberweis	1,538,522	42.69%	+14.16%
Libertarian	Sharon Hansen	135,316	3.76%	+2.82%
Write-in		44	0.00%	N/A
Total votes		3,603,519	100.00%	N/A
Democratic hold				

==== Results by county ====
County	Dick Durbin Democratic		Jim Oberweis Republican		Various Candidates Other Parties		Margin		Total
County	#	%	#	%	#	%	#	%	Total
Adams	6,307	28.15%	15,277	68.18%	822	3.67%	-8,970	-40.03%	22,406
Alexander	1,361	58.71%	846	36.50%	111	4.79%	515	22.21%	2,318
Bond	2,001	40.65%	2,689	54.62%	233	4.73%	-688	-13.97%	4,923
Boone	5,735	37.70%	8,704	57.22%	772	5.08%	-2,969	-19.52%	15,211
Brown	476	30.18%	1,030	65.31%	71	4.50%	-554	-35.13%	1,577
Bureau	5,329	42.09%	6,798	53.69%	534	4.22%	-1,469	-11.60%	12,661
Calhoun	1,003	50.84%	904	45.82%	66	3.35%	99	5.02%	1,973
Carroll	2,161	38.92%	3,131	56.39%	260	4.68%	-970	-17.47%	5,552
Cass	1,586	42.01%	2,002	53.03%	187	4.95%	-416	-11.02%	3,775
Champaign	26,489	48.60%	25,958	47.63%	2,054	3.77%	531	0.97%	54,501
Christian	4,189	36.08%	6,896	59.40%	525	4.52%	-2,707	-23.32%	11,610
Clark	1,507	28.95%	3,437	66.02%	262	5.03%	-1,930	-37.07%	5,206
Clay	1,132	28.90%	2,587	66.05%	198	5.05%	-1,455	-37.15%	3,917
Clinton	4,657	36.79%	7,428	58.67%	575	4.54%	-2,771	-21.88%	12,660
Coles	5,625	38.08%	8,483	57.43%	662	4.48%	-2,858	-19.35%	14,770
Cook	945,635	70.94%	345,255	25.90%	42,128	3.16%	600,380	45.04%	1,333,018
Crawford	2,032	32.24%	3,922	62.23%	348	5.52%	-1,890	-29.99%	6,302
Cumberland	1,334	33.97%	2,376	60.50%	217	5.53%	-1,042	-26.53%	3,927
DeKalb	12,551	44.64%	14,096	50.14%	1,467	5.22%	-1,545	-5.50%	28,114
DeWitt	1,766	32.26%	3,437	62.78%	272	4.97%	-1,671	-30.52%	5,475
Douglas	1,897	31.65%	3,859	64.39%	237	3.95%	-1,962	-32.74%	5,993
DuPage	129,941	45.50%	144,505	50.60%	11,164	3.91%	-14,564	-5.10%	285,610
Edgar	2,395	38.38%	3,555	56.96%	291	4.66%	-1,160	-18.58%	6,241
Edwards	558	24.71%	1,608	71.21%	92	4.07%	-1,050	-46.50%	2,258
Effingham	3,493	28.64%	8,303	68.07%	401	3.29%	-4,810	-39.43%	12,197
Fayette	2,183	33.31%	4,104	62.63%	266	4.06%	-1,921	-29.32%	6,553
Ford	1,256	28.05%	3,034	67.77%	187	4.18%	-1,778	-39.72%	4,477
Franklin	5,723	45.13%	6,375	50.28%	582	4.59%	-652	-5.15%	12,680
Fulton	5,885	53.13%	4,655	42.03%	536	4.84%	1,230	11.10%	11,076
Gallatin	905	49.56%	830	45.45%	91	4.98%	75	4.11%	1,826
Greene	1,822	41.90%	2,319	53.33%	207	4.76%	-497	-11.43%	4,348
Grundy	6,982	42.33%	8,655	52.48%	856	5.19%	-1,673	-10.15%	16,493
Hamilton	1,288	41.43%	1,671	53.75%	150	4.82%	-383	-12.32%	3,109
Hancock	1,898	31.69%	3,851	64.30%	240	4.01%	-1,953	-32.61%	5,989
Hardin	581	40.15%	811	56.05%	55	3.80%	-230	-15.90%	1,447
Henderson	1,259	48.48%	1,217	46.86%	121	4.66%	42	1.62%	2,597
Henry	7,556	42.75%	9,464	53.55%	654	3.70%	-1,908	-10.80%	17,674
Iroquois	2,481	26.30%	6,548	69.40%	406	4.30%	-4,067	-43.10%	9,435
Jackson	8,534	52.65%	6,962	42.95%	714	4.40%	1,572	9.70%	16,210
Jasper	1,476	36.35%	2,377	58.55%	207	5.10%	-901	-22.20%	4,060
Jefferson	5,018	40.73%	6,738	54.69%	565	4.59%	-1,720	-13.96%	12,321
Jersey	3,176	39.85%	4,434	55.64%	359	4.50%	-1,258	-15.79%	7,969
Jo Daviess	3,220	41.72%	4,138	53.61%	361	4.68%	-918	-11.89%	7,719
Johnson	1,418	31.19%	2,924	64.31%	205	4.51%	-1,506	-33.12%	4,547
Kane	55,253	44.26%	64,014	51.28%	5,564	4.46%	-8,761	-7.02%	124,831
Kankakee	14,830	43.76%	17,434	51.45%	1,624	4.79%	-2,604	-7.69%	33,888
Kendall	13,244	41.09%	17,263	53.56%	1,723	5.35%	-4,019	-12.47%	32,230
Knox	8,240	51.19%	7,213	44.81%	644	4.00%	1,027	6.38%	16,097
Lake	95,886	49.57%	90,958	47.02%	6,606	3.41%	4,928	2.55%	193,450
LaSalle	14,950	42.29%	18,482	52.28%	1,920	5.43%	-3,532	-9.99%	35,352
Lawrence	1,456	35.56%	2,400	58.61%	239	5.84%	-944	-23.05%	4,095
Lee	4,345	38.61%	6,346	56.39%	563	5.00%	-2,001	-17.78%	11,254
Livingston	3,447	30.86%	7,236	64.78%	487	4.36%	-3,789	-33.92%	11,170
Logan	2,679	31.06%	5,588	64.79%	358	4.15%	-2,909	-33.73%	8,625
Macon	13,098	39.14%	19,063	56.96%	1,306	3.90%	-5,965	-17.82%	33,467
Macoupin	7,163	45.43%	7,811	49.54%	794	5.04%	-648	-4.11%	15,768
Madison	35,566	44.90%	40,116	50.65%	3,528	4.45%	-4,550	-5.75%	79,210
Marion	4,782	40.46%	6,476	54.80%	560	4.74%	-1,694	-14.34%	11,818
Marshall	1,525	35.87%	2,554	60.07%	173	4.07%	-1,029	-24.20%	4,252
Mason	2,474	46.81%	2,532	47.91%	279	5.28%	-58	-1.10%	5,285
Massac	1,570	36.92%	2,543	59.79%	140	3.29%	-973	-22.87%	4,253
McDonough	3,422	39.89%	4,818	56.17%	338	3.94%	-1,396	-16.28%	8,578
McHenry	35,445	37.88%	53,601	57.28%	4,532	4.84%	-18,156	-19.40%	93,578
McLean	18,967	37.57%	29,885	59.19%	1,634	3.24%	-10,918	-21.62%	50,486
Menard	1,595	32.64%	3,140	64.27%	151	3.09%	-1,545	-31.63%	4,886
Mercer	3,036	46.62%	3,165	48.60%	311	4.78%	-129	-1.98%	6,512
Monroe	4,441	35.42%	7,663	61.11%	435	3.47%	-3,222	-25.69%	12,539
Montgomery	3,422	39.05%	4,914	56.07%	428	4.88%	-1,492	-17.02%	8,764
Morgan	4,534	40.59%	6,212	55.61%	425	3.80%	-1,678	-15.02%	11,171
Moultrie	1,480	32.46%	2,884	63.26%	195	4.28%	-1,404	-30.80%	4,559
Ogle	5,611	33.00%	10,602	62.36%	789	4.64%	-4,991	-29.36%	17,002
Peoria	23,832	45.72%	26,824	51.45%	1,475	2.83%	-2,992	-5.73%	52,131
Perry	3,400	46.95%	3,592	49.61%	249	3.44%	-192	-2.66%	7,241
Piatt	2,499	35.28%	4,271	60.29%	314	4.43%	-1,772	-25.01%	7,084
Pike	2,019	35.08%	3,509	60.97%	227	3.94%	-1,490	-25.89%	5,755
Pope	537	34.40%	951	60.92%	73	4.68%	-414	-26.52%	1,561
Pulaski	1,329	51.93%	1,132	44.24%	98	3.83%	197	7.69%	2,559
Putnam	1,163	46.04%	1,232	48.77%	131	5.19%	-69	-2.73%	2,526
Randolph	5,235	46.72%	5,544	49.48%	426	3.80%	-309	-2.76%	11,205
Richland	1,466	29.71%	3,244	65.73%	225	4.56%	-1,778	-36.02%	4,935
Rock Island	24,143	53.64%	19,406	43.11%	1,461	3.25%	4,737	10.53%	45,010
Saline	3,337	43.18%	4,043	52.32%	348	4.50%	-706	-9.14%	7,728
Sangamon	31,214	43.33%	38,189	53.01%	2,638	3.66%	-6,975	-9.68%	72,041
Schuyler	1,378	42.24%	1,726	52.91%	158	4.84%	-348	-10.67%	3,262
Scott	827	38.04%	1,243	57.18%	104	4.78%	-416	-19.14%	2,174
Shelby	2,537	31.31%	5,147	63.53%	418	5.16%	-2,610	-32.22%	8,102
St. Clair	38,813	50.67%	34,877	45.53%	2,915	3.81%	3,936	5.14%	76,605
Stark	682	35.73%	1,135	59.46%	92	4.82%	-453	-23.73%	1,909
Stephenson	5,728	39.54%	8,080	55.77%	680	4.69%	-2,352	-16.23%	14,488
Tazewell	15,511	35.58%	26,574	60.96%	1,505	3.45%	-11,063	-25.38%	43,590
Union	2,761	44.91%	3,161	51.42%	226	3.68%	-400	-6.51%	6,148
Vermilion	9,112	42.12%	11,610	53.67%	910	4.21%	-2,498	-11.55%	21,632
Wabash	1,232	32.32%	2,403	63.04%	177	4.64%	-1,171	-30.72%	3,812
Warren	2,420	44.27%	2,857	52.27%	189	3.46%	-437	-8.00%	5,466
Washington	1,885	33.27%	3,532	62.34%	249	4.39%	-1,647	-29.07%	5,666
Wayne	1,289	22.45%	4,189	72.97%	263	4.58%	-2,900	-50.52%	5,741
White	2,138	36.08%	3,519	59.39%	268	4.52%	-1,381	-23.31%	5,925
Whiteside	8,517	48.47%	8,331	47.41%	723	4.11%	186	1.06%	17,571
Will	91,471	47.48%	93,138	48.35%	8,028	4.17%	-1,667	-0.87%	192,637
Williamson	7,686	37.82%	11,880	58.46%	754	3.71%	-4,194	-20.64%	20,320
Winnebago	35,436	44.94%	40,239	51.03%	3,184	4.04%	-4,803	-6.09%	78,859
Woodford	3,758	26.86%	9,838	70.32%	395	2.82%	-6,080	-43.46%	13,991
Total	1,929,637	53.55%	1,538,522	42.69%	135,360	3.76%	391,115	10.86%	3,603,519

==== Counties that flipped from Democratic to Republican ====
- Bond (largest city: Greenville)
- Bureau (largest city: Princeton)
- Cass (largest city: Beardstown)
- Christian (largest city: Taylorville)
- Clay (largest city: Flora)
- Clinton (largest city: Breese)
- Coles (largest city: Charleston)
- DeKalb (largest city: DeKalb)
- Fayette (largest city: Vandalia)
- Greene (largest city: Carrollton)
- Grundy (largest city: Morris)
- Hamilton (largest city: McLeansboro)
- Hancock (largest city: Hamilton)
- Hardin (largest city: Rosiclare)
- Jefferson (largest city: Mount Vernon)
- Jersey (largest city: Jerseyville)
- Jo Daviess (largest city: Galena)
- Kankakee (largest city: Kankakee)
- Lawrence (largest city: Lawrenceville)
- Marion (largest city: Centralia)
- Marshall (largest city: Henry)
- Mason (largest city: Havana)
- Massac (largest city: Metropolis)
- McDonough (largest city: Macomb)
- Moultrie (largest city: Sullivan)
- Piatt (largest city: Monticello)
- Pike (largest city: Pittsfield)
- Pope (largest city: Golconda)
- Randolph (largest city: Chester)
- Saline (largest city: Harrisburg)
- Schuyler (largest city: Rushville)
- Shelby (largest city: Shelbyville)
- Union (largest city: Anna)
- Vermilion (largest city: Danville)
- Warren (largest city: Monmouth)
- White (largest city: Carmi)
- Will (largest city: Joliet)
- Williamson (largest city: Marion)
- Winnebago (largest city: Rockford)
- Franklin (largest city: West Frankfort)
- Henry (largest city: Kewanee)
- LaSalle (largest city: Ottawa)
- Macon (largest city: Decatur)
- Macoupin (largest city: Carlinville)
- Montgomery (largest city: Litchfield)
- Perry (largest city: Du Quoin)
- Boone (largest city: Belvidere)
- Carroll (largest city: Savanna)
- DuPage (largest city: Aurora)
- Kane (largest city: Aurora)
- Kendall (largest village: Oswego)
- McHenry (largest city: Crystal Lake)
- McLean (largest city: Bloomington)
- Stephenson (largest city: Freeport)
- Adams (largest city: Quincy)
- Brown (largest city: Mount Sterling)
- Cumberland (largest city: Neoga)
- Crawford (largest city: Robinson)
- DeWitt (largest city: Clinton)
- Douglas (largest city: Tuscola)
- Clark (largest city: Marshall)
- Edgar (largest city: Paris)
- Effingham (largest city: Effingham)
- Ford (largest city: Paxton)
- Iroqouis (largest city: Watseka)
- Jasper (largest city: Newton)
- Lake (largest city: Waukegan)
- Livingston (largest city: Pontiac)
- Lee (largest city: Dixon)
- Logan (largest city: Lincoln)
- Madison (largest city: Granite City)
- Menard (largest city: Petersburg)
- Mercer (largest city: Aledo)
- Monroe (largest city: Waterloo)
- Morgan (largest city: Jacksonville)
- Ogle (largest city: Rochelle)
- Peoria (largest city: Peoria)
- Putnam (largest city: Hennpin)
- Richland (largest city: Olney)
- Sangamon (largest city: Springfield)
- Scott (largest city: Winchester)
- Tazewell (largest city: Pekin)
- Wabash (largest city: Mount Carmel)
- Washington (largest city: Nashville)

== See also ==
- 2014 United States Senate elections
- 2014 United States elections
- 2014 United States House of Representatives elections in Illinois
- 2014 Illinois gubernatorial election
