= John Catanzara =

American police union leader

- Born: Chicago, Illinois, U.S.
- Occupation: Union organizer
- Children: 1

John Catanzara is an American police union leader, and former member of the Chicago Police Department. Since May 2020, Catanzara has been president of Lodge 7 of the Fraternal Order of Police. He joined the Chicago Police Department in 1995 and was placed on administrative leave after filing a report against former Police Superintendent Eddie T. Johnson. Catanzara resigned from the CPD in November 2021, as his firing from the CPD appeared imminent, and announced his intention to run for mayor of Chicago.

== Early life ==
Catanzara was raised in Garfield Ridge, Chicago. His father was a truck driver and active union member. After graduating from St Rita High School, Catanzara worked as a truck driver.

== Career ==
Catanzara joined the Chicago Police Department in 1995. In 2020, Catanzara was elected as the head of the Chicago Fraternal Order of Police (FOP). Previously in 2017, Catanzara stated of Muslims: "Savages they all deserve a bullet." Later he defended the 2021 storming of the United States Capitol by Trump supporters, stating that: "They’re individuals ... They get to do what they want." Catanzara has faced numerous complaints of misconduct during his over 20-year career as a CPD officer.

He was assigned as the school officer at Hubbard High School for several years where he coached cross country and was involved with the school's Junior Reserve Officers' Training Corps program. In February 2021, Catanzara was suspended without pay from the Chicago Police Department for authoring a series of obscene and inflammatory social media posts, making false reports and being insubordinate or disrespectful to supervisors. In August 2021, he was criticized by mayor Lori Lightfoot, the Anti-Defamation League, and the American Jewish Committee for his comments comparing vaccine mandates to The Holocaust.

In October 2021, Catanzara urged union police officers to file exemptions for the city's COVID vaccine reporting mandate and hold off on reporting vaccination status while on-going discussion between F.O.P. police union and city officials continue.

In November 2021, Catanzara resigned from the CPD amid a disciplinary case against him in regard to alleged departmental rule violations, inflammatory social media posts, and creating false reports against superior officers.

Catanzara announced his candidacy for the 2023 Chicago mayoral election. After Catanzara was disqualified, he endorsed Paul Vallas. During the mayoral runoff campaign, Catanzara stated that if the other candidate Brandon Johnson won there would be "blood in the streets" and mass resignations from the police department.

In March 2023, Catanzara was reelected as union president of the Chicago FOP, with 57% of the vote.

=== Disciplinary record ===
Catanzara had been suspended 9 times for a total of 131 days during his career. He was subject of 50 civilian complaints, which put him in the 96th percentile of officers. Ten of the civilian complaints were sustained. He survived two previous attempts to fire him, before he resigned in the middle of another disciplinary action where he could potentially have lost his job.

== Personal life ==
Catanzara had a son at the age of 22. Catanzara is a supporter of Donald Trump.
