= Amara Enyia =

American strategist, politician, and community organizer

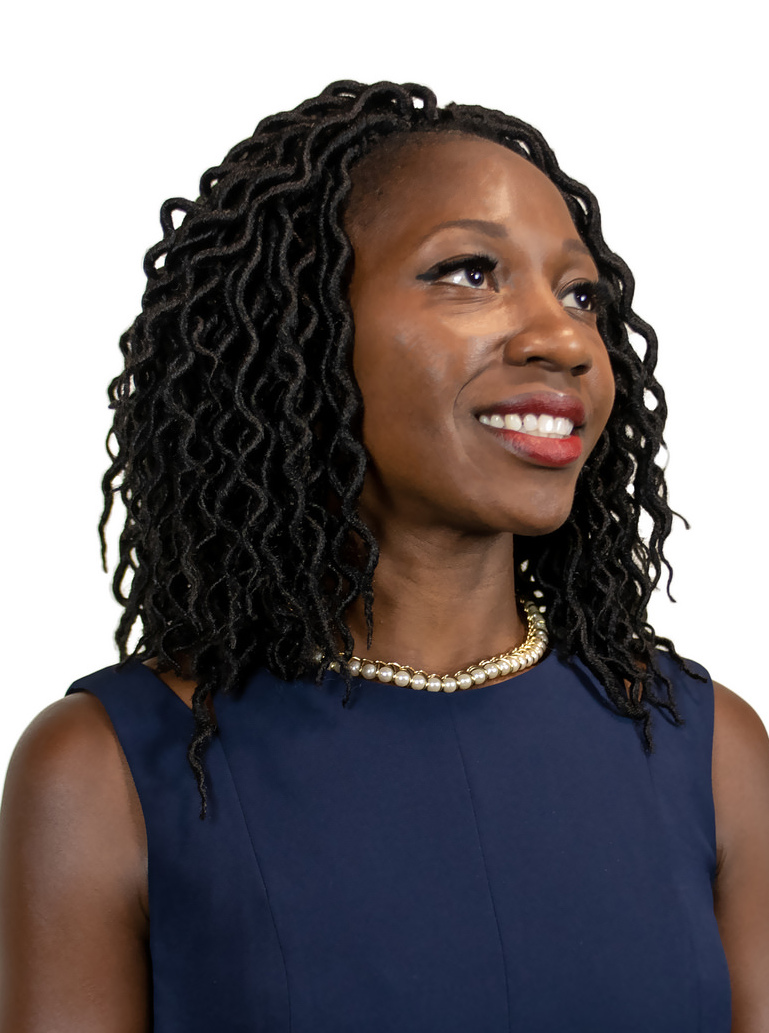
- Enyia in 2018

Personal details
- Born: Amarachuku Enyia; 1982 or 1983 (age 43–44) Baltimore, Maryland, U.S.
- Party: Democratic
- Education: University of Illinois, Urbana-Champaign (BS, MEd, JD, PhD)
- Website: Official website

Amarachuku C. "Amara" Enyia (born 1982/1983) is an American strategist, politician, community organizer, and municipal consultant. She is the policy and research coordinator for the Movement for Black Lives; the chairwoman of the International Civil Society Working Group (ICSWG) of the United Nations Permanent Forum on People of African Descent; and a senior advisor to the Institute On Race, Power and Political Economy at The New School. She has also worked as the director of Chicago's Austin Chamber of Commerce; the interim village manager of University Park, Illinois; and chief executive officer of ACE Municipal Partners, a municipal consulting firm. Enyia was a candidate for mayor of Chicago in 2015 and 2019, receiving 8% of the vote in the first round of the latter election. Enyia is regarded to be a political progressive.

== Early life and education ==
Enyia's parents were born in Nigeria and migrated to the United States in the 1970s. She was born in Baltimore, Maryland and raised in University Park, Illinois, where she attended Crete-Monee High School. Her father was a professor at Governors State University. She attended graduate school and law school at the University of Illinois at Urbana-Champaign, where she received a Master of Education in 2008, a J.D. in 2009, and a PhD in Educational Policy Studies in 2010. At the University of Illinois, Enyia worked as a reporter, development editor, and editor-in-chief for Illini Media.

== Policy work and community organizing ==
Enyia worked in the policy department of the Chicago mayor's office from 2009 until the end of Mayor Richard M. Daley's term in May 2011. In this fellowship she worked on a variety of matters, including transportation and ecumenic development.

After her fellowship in Daley's office, Enyia worked as a community organizer in Chicago's West Side. In April 2011, she was hired as the executive director of Austin Coming Together, an umbrella organization that promotes coordination and collaboration between community and nonprofit organizations in the Austin neighborhood of Chicago. She spent roughly a year in this position. During her time as executive director of Austin Coming Together, she was also part of the Community Action Councils, which assisted the Chicago Public Schools to develop an educational strategy in the city's communities. She also founded ACE Municipal Partners, a consulting firm that works with municipal officials. In 2013, Enyia began working as the director of the Austin Chamber of Commerce. She held this position until 2019, when she stepped down amid her second campaign for mayor of Chicago. Enyia also blogged about local government affairs under the pseudonym "The Municipal Maven."

Having aborted a campaign for mayor of Chicago months earlier, in September 2015, Enyia formed an exploratory committee to look at launching a possible primary election challenge to longtime incumbent Democratic congressman Danny Davis in 2016. In November 2015, she announced that would not challenge Davis and that she would instead partner with Davis to establish a new youth initiative called the "Bridge program". This program partnered local youth with elected officials and community stakeholders with expertise, with the aim of increasing youth engagement in political organizing. In late-2015, the initiative was launched in the Austin neighborhood.

Enyia was one of eight co-authors of the 2016 book Chicago Isn't Broke: Funding the City We Deserve, the main author of which was former Chicago alderman Dick Simpson. Enyia also worked as a policy director for the Chicago Principals and Administrators Association.

In May 2017, Enyia took a job as the interim village manager of University Park, Illinois. Her brief tenure as interim village manager was later reported to have been troublesome, with a dispute taking place between her and the village surrounding what her salary should be, and some village trustees criticizing her during her tenure for doing what they regarded to be an insufficient amount of work. The village's mayor Vivian Covington praised the value of Enyia's legal expertise, despite critics in the village arguing it was limited in value by the fact she was not a practicing attorney. In August 2017, her tenure ended.

In September 2017, Enyia began consulting work for Kids First Chicago, a significant school choice advocacy group. This came despite Enyia's stated political opposition to charter schools. Enyia worked as a consultant on Chris Kennedy's 2018 Illinois gubernatorial campaign. Enyia founded the Institute for Cooperative Economics and Economic Innovation social lab in 2018, for which she partnered with the organization Blue1647. However, the social lab never advanced beyond a nascent stage before Enyia abandoned it to pursue her second campaign for mayor, at which time she also left her role as Director of the Austin Chamber of Commerce.

In 2019, after her mayoral campaign, Enyia joined the board of directors of the Chicago Community Loan Fund. By 2021, Enyia had begun serving as the policy and research coordinator for the Movement for Black Lives. Enyia also has served chairwoman of the International Civil Society Working Group (ICSWG) of the United Nations Permanent Forum on People of African Descent, and served as a strategist for the Global Circle for Reparations and Healing (GCRH)., Enyia worked as a leader in residence at the Atlantic Institute and as a senior advisor to the Institute On Race, Power and Political Economy at The New School.

Amid the 2020 George Floyd protests and coinciding civil unrest, Enyia helped organize local organizations and block clubs to protect local businesses in the Austin neighborhoods from vandalism and looting. She also penned an op-ed for Injustice Watch arguing that Chicago should "defund" its police department. In March 2021, Enyia gave her endorsement to an ordinance introduced by Byron Sigcho-Lopez that would see the city of Chicago spend $180 million in federal stimulus funding on creating new sites to distribute COVID-19 vaccines and increase the staffing at the city's health department.

In July 2026, Enyia led a meeting of the International Civil Society Working Group for the Permanent Forum on People of African Descent (ICSWG-PFPAD), held in Colombia.

== Mayoral campaigns ==
=== 2015 ===
Enyia announced her candidacy for the 2015 mayoral election on February 25, 2014. Alongside Robert Shaw, who announced the same day, she was one of the first two candidates to announce that they were going to challenge incumbent mayor Rahm Emanuel. Enyia planned to run a grassroots campaign operation.

Enyia's campaign failed to register in preference polls, and as a candidate she didn't disclose many specific plans. She withdrew from the race on December 9, 2014 and endorsed Bob Fioretti the next day. Enyia dropped-out due to the fact that her candidature petitions were being challenged and her campaign lacked the resources to fight such a challenge.

=== 2019 ===
On August 28, 2018, Enyia announced that she would once again run for Chicago mayor in the 2019 election at a campaign launch event in the Bridgeport neighborhood. She expressed support for police reform, increasing budget transparency, investment in neighborhood development projects, and proposed the creation of a public bank and the use of Community Benefits Agreements for large development projects. Politically, she described herself as an independent Democrat.

On October 16, 2018, she was endorsed by Chance the Rapper, garnering significant attention for her campaign in local media and national media. Chance later donated $400,000 to her campaign.

On December 12, her campaign saw a high-profile departure, with her communications director quitting citing "troubling factors". She replaced her departing communications director with Camonghne Felix. Some ultimately characterized Enyia's campaign as disorganized.

On January 31, Dorothy Brown, whose own candidacy had ended after she was removed from the ballot due to issues with her petition, endorsed Enyia. Enyia embraced this endorsement, and praised Brown. There was speculation as to whether this endorsement would be of assistance or detriment to Enyia's candidacy. It was speculated that it might have helped Enyia by introducing her to Brown's base of support (which tended to be older African American churchgoing women), and might have elevated her to be considered more of a tip-tier candidate. It was also speculated that it could have harmed her candidacy, as Brown was a longtime officeholder with significant ethics concerns, which could have undermined Enyia's efforts to present herself as an outsider candidate seeking to upend political corruption.

Due to her 2015 campaign not filing quarterly finance reports after it was suspended, she accrued $73,540 in debt that would have to be paid for her to appear on the 2019 ballot. On October 22, 2018, Kanye West made a contribution of that exact amount to Enyia's campaign. The campaign released a statement that its debt to the Illinois State Board of Elections had been paid in full and thanking West for his "generous action".

Enyia's campaign focused much of its efforts on the youth vote. One of her efforts was a February 11 "Party to the Polls", which Enyia described as a key part of her strategy aimed at engaging college students. The rally bussed college students from seventeen Chicago-area campuses to the Richard J. Daley Center for a rally followed by early voting. It went poorly. Despite having been advertised to appear, Chance the Rapper backed out the day of the rally. Despite heavy advance advertising of the event on college campuses, only roughly forty people showed up to the rally. Ultimately, youth turnout in the election was low.

As press coverage of Enyia increased towards February, the increased scrutiny included some bad press. At the start of February, the Chicago Tribune reported that in 2018, she had failed to report a third of her income, including the $21,000 she received or her work on Chris Kennedy's gubernatorial campaign. In mid-February, the Tribune reported that she had allegedly failed to pay a former campaign spokesperson $24,000 for four-month of work. Additionally, Enyia's campaign website was criticized for claims on her website and in past media appearances that she was an Ironman competitor, despite never having competed in an Ironman-branded event.

In the preliminary election on February 26, 2019, Enyia placed sixth in a field of fourteen candidates, winning about 8% of the vote.

Enyia opted against endorsing either Lori Lightfoot or Toni Preckwinkle in the runoff, arguing that neither of the two candidates were truly "progressive".

In July 2019, Enyia's campaign was sued by 24 former campaign staffers alleging wage theft. Her campaign responded by saying that the campaign was in debt, and that it planned to continue holding fundraisers to pay off the debt and unpaid wages. Enyia and Gray were defendants in the lawsuit, along with campaign operations director Pilar Audain, field director Marcus Ferrell and treasurer and finance director DeAnna Gran. Her campaign manager, Joshua Gray, accused her of making promises to pay the staff in question, alleging that she promised them, "she could get the money from her celebrity donors who were giving her money at the time." On October 24, 2022, the Illinois Department of Labor's Law Division found that Gray had been responsible for the operations and involved in talks about expenditures.

Enyia's campaign received significant coverage in the 2020 Steve James documentary series City So Real, which centers on the mayoral election.

== Personal life ==
At the time of 2019 mayoral candidacy, Enyia was residing in the Garfield Park neighborhood in Chicago. She has five siblings, including a twin sister.

She describes herself as fluent in Igbo, Spanish, French, and Portuguese.

=== Relatives ===
In 2020, her cousin Chibuike Enyia was elected to the village board of Oak Park, Illinois.

Her brother, Chimaobi Enyia, was formerly the director of the Illinois Liquor Control Commission and formerly an aide to Illinois Governor Pat Quinn. 2023 Chicago mayoral election runner-up Paul Vallas, after his 2023 election loss, filed a lawsuit against Chimaobi Enyia for allegedly defrauding his campaign of $680,000 while working as a vendor hired for Black voter outreach.

== Bibliography ==
Enyia was one of the contributors to political scientist and former Chicago alderman Dick Simpson's 2016 book Chicago is Not Broke: Funding the City We Deserve.

Op-eds by Enyia

- Mayoral candidates need to focus on economic divide – published by Crain's Chicago Business (March 12, 2019)
- Chicago must defund—not just reform—the police – published by Injustice Watch (June 16, 2020)
- Amara Enyia: Beware 'dialogue as spectacle' in fight to transform Chicago police – published by Injustice Watch (September 15, 2020)
- A Global Commitment to Combatting Anti-Blackness: Why the World Needs a Permanent Forum on People of African Descent – published by Ms. (July 29, 2021)
- Why The Biden Administration Is Accountable For America's Bullying Past Towards Haiti – published by BET (September 25, 2021)
- "Compromising" On $3.5 Trillion Social Safety Net Bill Harms Black Communities. We Can't Let That Happen. (co-written with Maurice Mitchell) – published by Essence (October 26, 2021)
- Op-Ed: Chicago's Bitter Pill of Violence – published by Chicago Magazine (June 6, 2022)
- Op-Ed: Reparations Must Be More Than A Check – published by NewsOne (August 2, 2022)
- Looking for Tax Money in All the Wrong Places: Structural Racism at the IRS – published by Nonprofit Quarterly (April 19, 2023)

Other written works

- The Municipal Maven – blog authored by Enyia (active between April 2013 and July 2015)

== Electoral history ==
2019 Chicago mayoral election
Candidate	General election		Runoff election	
Candidate	Votes	%	Votes	%
Lori Lightfoot	97,667	17.54	386,039	73.70
Toni Preckwinkle	89,343	16.04	137,765	26.30
William Daley	82,294	14.78		
Willie Wilson	59,072	10.61		
Susana Mendoza	50,373	9.05		
Amara Enyia	44,589	8.00		
Jerry Joyce	40,099	7.20		
Gery Chico	34,521	6.20		
Paul Vallas	30,236	5.43		
Garry McCarthy	14,784	2.66		
La Shawn K. Ford	5,606	1.01		
Robert "Bob" Fioretti	4,302	0.77		
John Kolzar	2,349	0.42		
Neal Sales-Griffin	1,523	0.27		
Write-ins	86	0.02		
Total	556,844	100	523,804	100
