= Capitol Fax =

US political newsletter for Illinois politics

- "Your Illinois News Radar"
- Founder(s): Rich Miller
- Editor: Rich Miller
- Founded: 1993; 32 years ago
- Language: English
- OCLC number: 226394739
- Website: www.capitolfax.com

Capitol Fax is a daily political newsletter covering Illinois politics. It was founded in 1993 by Rich Miller.

== Background ==
Capitol Fax, Inc., based in Springfield, Illinois, was founded in 1993 by Rich Miller. Miller is the lead writer, editor and publisher of Capitol Fax. Capitol Fax media has a for-fee, subscription-based newsletter, with selected excerpts offered for free as an online magazine. Capitol Fax also has a YouTube channel. Capital Fax, Inc., according to the Illinois Secretary of State's website is actually based in Naperville, Illinois. Its president and secretary is listed as Joseph Pomaranski, a corporate consultant and financier. As of 2023, Capitol Fax seems not to have any physical presence in Springfield.

== Rich Miller ==
Miller was a columnist for the Chicago Sun-Times for 8 years before joining Crain's Chicago Business in 2014 as a columnist. The Institute of Government and Public Affairs at the University of Illinois stated that, "Miller is widely regarded as one of the most knowledgeable and connected journalists in the Illinois State Capitol. His daily intelligence from inside state government and politics influences politics and policy throughout the state."

== Reception ==
The University of Chicago Institute of Politics said Capitol Fax is "a must-read for policymakers, lobbyists and journalists in the Statehouse." The Center for State Policy and Leadership at the University of Illinois at Springfield said "Miller's readers are the legislators, staffers, lobbyists, reporters and business owners throughout Illinois who pay $500 a year to subscribe to Capitol Fax, the two-to-three page daily newsletter that’s unknown in most of the state but ubiquitous in the Statehouse."

Illinois public employees spent more than a quarter of a million dollars of public funds on Capitol Fax subscriptions between 2005 and 2013, according to an analysis of public records by the libertarian website Illinois Mirror. In 2013 total subscription expenses by Illinois public employees, Capitol Fax ranked second to the Chicago Tribune, and ahead of Crain's Chicago Business and the Chicago Sun-Times, according to the conservative website Illinois Review. Former Illinois Republican gubernatorial candidate, Adam Andrzejewski asked "Is Miller the most conflicted journalist in the country?"
