= Illinois Manufacturers' Association =

U.S. state trade organization

- Abbreviation: IMA
- Formation: September 29, 1893; 132 years ago
- Type: Trade association
- Headquarters: Oak Brook, Illinois
- President & CEO: Mark Denzler
- Vice President: Gordy Hulten
- Website: ima-net.org
- Formerly called: Illinois Manufacturers' Protective Association

The Illinois Manufacturers' Association (IMA) is a trade association for manufacturing companies in Illinois. It bills itself as "the oldest and largest statewide manufacturing trade association in the United States." Based in Oak Brook, Illinois, and founded in 1893 by businessmen opposed to legislation limiting the working hours of women, IMA has more than 4000 member companies. The association lobbies on behalf of Illinois manufacturing interests and has its own political action committee and polling organization. IMA's president and CEO is Mark Denzler. The IMA publishes a quarterly magazine, The Illinois Manufacturer.

== History ==
On September 29, 1893, Illinois manufacturers met at the Grand Pacific Hotel to organize in opposition to the Sweatshop Law of 1893 that prohibited child labor and mandated an eight-hour workday. The manufacturers formed the Illinois Manufacturers' Protective Association "for the purpose of co-operating to test the constitutionality of a recent act of the Legislature of this State limiting the hours of Female Labor." Governor Peter Altgeld had made Florence Kelley the Chief Factory Inspector for the state of Illinois. The Manufacturers' Protective Association sponsored a number of cases which led to the Illinois Supreme Court finding that Section 5 of the Act, which limited women's working weeks to 48 hours and their day to eight hours, unconstitutional in 1895. After Governor Altgeld was not re-elected in 1896 and Kelley was removed from her position, flagrant violations of the child labor provision were reported.

During the Coal Strike of 1919, the Illinois Manufacturers' Association announced a boycott against the striking coal miners, holding up orders of food, clothing and fuel for mining communities. Earlier that year, the IMA had asked the House Interstate Commerce Committee to outlaw railroad strikes or lockouts.

The Illinois Manufacturers' Association attempted to keep the Chicago labor radio station WCFL off the air in 1926 by protesting the use of Navy Pier as the station's transmitter and broadcasting site.

In 1935, the IMA opposed the Social Security Act, which it said would increase unemployment.

IMA commissioned a study by Fantus in 1975 that addressed state-by-state business climate in the United States. The study was criticized for its heavy emphasis on unions and taxes in its formulations. The IMA considered a merger with the Illinois Chamber of Commerce in 2000.

In 2010, Janice Christiansen became the first woman to become chair of the IMA Board of Directors. That year, IMA President Greg Baise was required to testify at a Bloomington trial regarding an alleged corporate conspiracy to conceal the hazards of asbestos.

In 2012, the IMA spoke out in favor of Illinois' enterprise zones and was a vocal member of the STOP Coalition, which opposed the construction of a coal power plant with pollution mitigation in Taylorville by Tenaska Energy. The association also supported plastic bag recycling.

Since 2019, the association has sponsored an annual “Makers Madness Contest,” a tournament where the Illinois public votes for its favorite product made in Illinois. Voters cast their ballots online until 16 top products are determined, then continue voting in one-to-one matchups until the winner is chosen. More than 300,000 votes were cast in the 2023 “Coolest Thing Made in Illinois” competition. The winner was the Rosenberg Moon Habitat manufactured by Ingersoll Machine Tools in Rockford, in collaboration with the Institut auf dem Rosenberg of Switzerland. The complex is designed to house two at a time on the moon. It is the world's tallest single-piece 3D printed polymer structure. A Komatzu mining truck, built in Peoria and designed to carry 400 tons, won the 2024 “Coolest Thing Made in Illinois” competition. In February 2025, the association opened entries for its sixth annual “Makers Madness” contest and invited the general Illinois public to vote for “…the coolest product made” in the state. The contest calls attention to the fact that manufacturing contributes nearly $600 billion (US) to the Illinois economy and provides more than 30% of state jobs. The winner will be announced on 12 April 2025. The contest has proved popular with Illinois residents. In March 2025, the association announced the "Top 16" winners, chosen by vote from over 250 entries.

In 2022, the IMA was awarded the Conference of State Manufacturers’ Leadership Award, presented by COSMA, the National Association of Manufacturers's official state partners. The achievements of the IMA incorporated a $7 million “Manufacturing Jobs Campaign,” focused on attracting veterans, women and communities of color (among others) to seek careers in the manufacturing sector.

=== Hall of Fame ===
In 2024, the organization initiated the Illinois Manufacturing Hall of Fame, honoring the “...people, products, and companies” that have had an impact on manufacturing in the state. Included among the first honorees is Abraham Lincoln, the first (and only) US president to be awarded a patent.

== Political influence ==
According to the IMA website, the association has influenced legislation resulting in corporate tax and sales tax breaks for its members of $300 million annually.

The association reviews bills introduced to the Illinois General Assembly and maintains a Legislative Watch List where it indicates its support or opposition to individual bills. In 2012, the IMA opposed bills that would require health insurance to cover pre-existing conditions, tie the minimum wage to the consumer price index, and provide coverage for maternity care and sick leave. The IMA also supported bills that would release employers from the obligation to pay workers compensation to employees that were discharged for cause, create an Illinois Health Benefits Exchange as part of the Patient Protection and Affordable Care Act, and amend the Employee Classification Act so that the term "employment" does not apply to truck drivers. In 2010, the IMA advocated tax exemptions for manufacturers.

IMA President Mark Denzler is an employer representative of Illinois' Workers Compensation Advisory Board and has hosted a weekly poker game in his office frequented by state legislators.

The Illinois Manufacturers' Association is a 501(c)(6) non-profit organization. It has its own political action committee called Manufacturers PAC or MPAC.

The Illinois Manufacturers' Association owns the for-profit subsidiary Xpress Professional Services, which conducts opinion polls through its polling organization, We Ask America. The firm conducts automated polls and has been described as conservative leaning and has received criticism for its methodology.

=== Opposition to military right-to-repair legislation ===
In July 2024, IMA signed a letter to members of both the House Committee on Armed Services and the Senate Committee on Armed Services opposing Section 828 of S. 4628, the National Defense Authorization Act for Fiscal Year 2025, entitled "Requirement for Contractors to Provide Reasonable Access to Repair Materials," which would require contractors doing business with the US military to agree "to provide the Department of Defense fair and reasonable access to all the repair materials, including parts, tools, and information, used by the manufacturer or provider or their authorized partners to diagnose, maintain, or repair the good or service."

== See also ==
- Ohio Manufacturers Association
