= Chuy García =

American politician (born 1956)

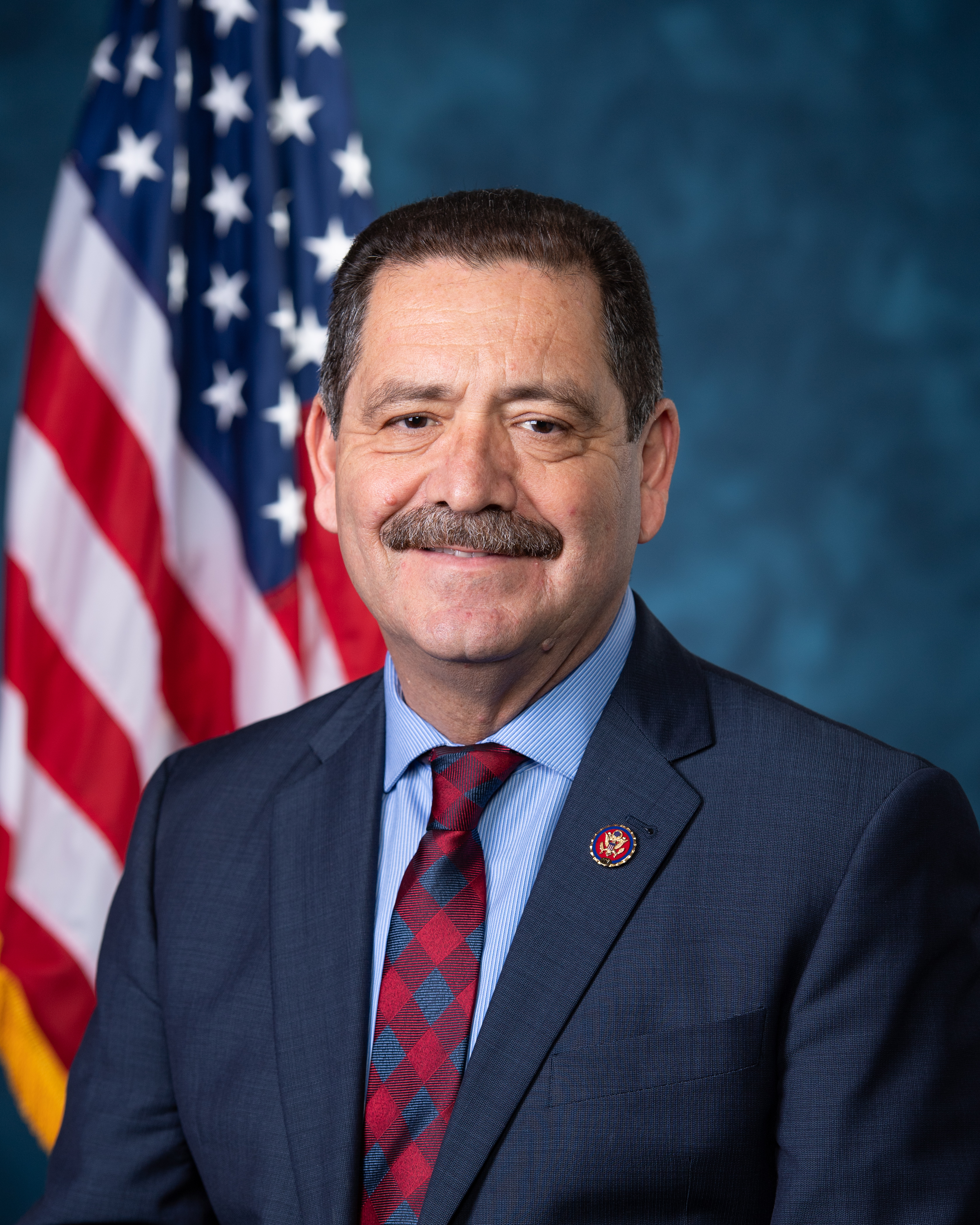
- Official portrait, 2019

Member of the U.S. House of Representatives from Illinois's 4th district
- Incumbent
- Assumed office January 3, 2019
- Preceded by: Luis Gutiérrez

Member of the Cook County Board of Commissioners from the 7th district
- In office January 3, 2011 – November 30, 2018
- Preceded by: Joseph Mario Moreno
- Succeeded by: Alma Anaya

Member of the Illinois Senate from the 1st district
- In office January 13, 1993 – January 13, 1999
- Preceded by: Howard W. Carroll
- Succeeded by: Antonio Munoz

Member of the Chicago City Council from the 22nd ward
- In office March 25, 1986 – January 1, 1993
- Preceded by: Frank Stemberk
- Succeeded by: Ricardo Muñoz

Personal details
- Born: April 12, 1956 (age 70) Durango, Mexico
- Party: Democratic
- Spouse: Evelyn García (m. 1980)
- Children: 3
- Education: University of Illinois Chicago (BA, MUP)
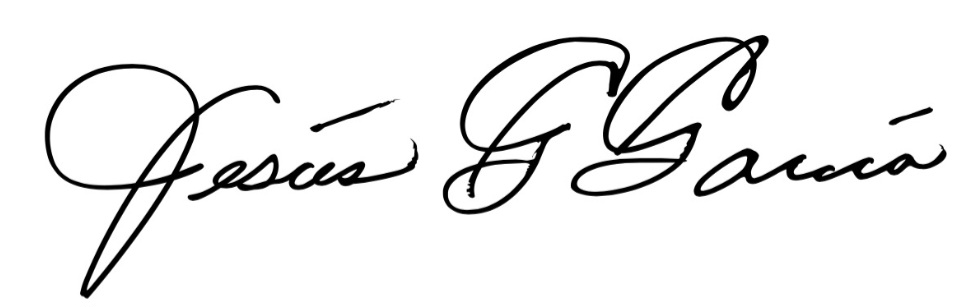
- Signature
- Website: House website Campaign website
- García's voice García honoring Jesse Jackson. Recorded July 18, 2023

Jesús G. "Chuy" García (/ˈtʃuːi/ CHOO-ee; born April 12, 1956) is an American politician serving as the U.S. representative for Illinois's 4th district since 2019. A member of the Democratic Party, he served on the Cook County Board of Commissioners, as well as in the Illinois Senate and on the Chicago City Council before his election to Congress. He was also a candidate for mayor of Chicago in 2015 and 2023. Throughout his career in Chicago and national politics, he has been described as a progressive.

García was first elected to the Chicago City Council in 1986. During his time on the city council, he was known for being a staunch ally of Mayor Harold Washington. In 1992, he became the first Mexican-American member of the Illinois State Senate. He was defeated in his reelection bid to the state senate by Antonio Munoz in the 1998 primary. In 2010, García was elected to the 7th district of the Cook County Board of Commissioners. He ran for mayor of Chicago in 2015, losing to incumbent mayor Rahm Emanuel in a runoff. In 2018, García was elected to the U.S. House of Representatives, succeeding ally Luis Gutiérrez. He ran again for mayor of Chicago in the 2023 election, challenging incumbent mayor Lori Lightfoot, but placed fourth in the first round.

On November 3, 2025, he announced he would not seek reelection in 2026. By delaying his decision until after the filing deadline, García effectively cleared the field for his chief of staff, Patty Garcia, who became the only Democrat on the ballot to succeed him. The maneuver was widely viewed as an attempt to engineer his own succession and deny voters a competitive primary, prompting criticism from local and national political figures. The House of Representatives passed a resolution condemning the move on November 18, 2025, 238–186.

== Personal life ==
García was born in Mexico in the state of Durango. His father was a farm laborer under the U.S. government's World War II-era bracero program.

García moved to the U.S. in 1965 with permanent resident status. The family settled in the Little Village neighborhood of Chicago, Illinois, where García continues to reside. He attended St. Rita High School, graduating in 1974. García became a citizen of the United States in 1977.

García worked at the Legal Assistance Foundation from 1977 to 1980 as he worked toward a B.A. in political science at the University of Illinois Chicago. He then became assistant director of the Little Village Neighborhood Housing Service, where he worked until 1984. García has a master's degree from University of Illinois Chicago in urban public planning and policy.

García and his wife, Evelyn, married in 1980. They have three children. They live in the Little Village neighborhood in South Lawndale, Chicago. In April 2023, García's daughter, Rosa, died at age 28 from undisclosed causes.

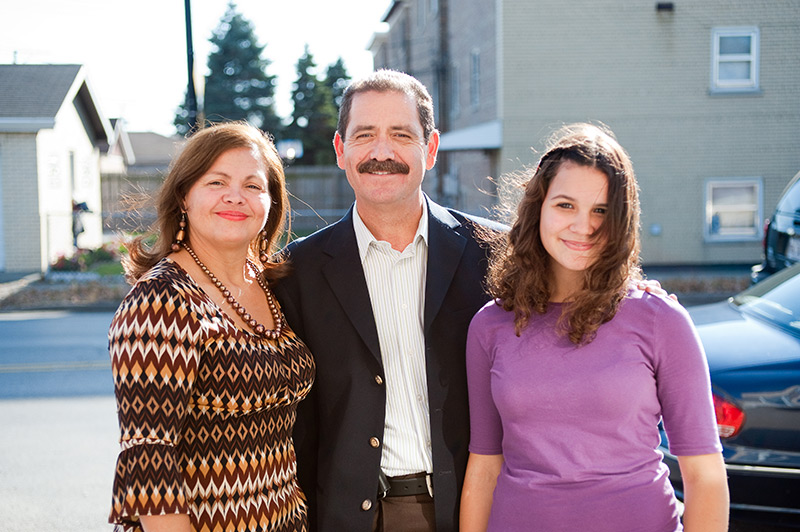
García with his family

== Early political career ==
=== Chicago City Council ===
In 1983, García was the campaign manager for labor organizer Rudy Lozano, who challenged longtime alderman Frank Stemberk of the 22nd Ward. In the February 1983 election, Lozano came 17 votes short of forcing a runoff, which his supporters contended was due to voters with Spanish surnames being purged from the rolls. Lozano was murdered in June 1983, shot to death in his home. A reputed gang member was convicted of Lozano's murder, but his supporters still contend that he was killed for his labor and political activities. In 1984, García challenged Stemberk for committeeman in the Cook County Democratic Party. Lozano's supporters rallied around him and he was endorsed by Mayor Harold Washington.

Stemberk was a supporter of alderman Edward Vrdolyak of the 10th Ward, who controlled the city council and opposed Washington's administration. The Chicago media dubbed this divide within city government the "Council Wars". With Lozano supporters taking to the race with a "religious fervor" and Washington campaigning heavily on García's behalf, he defeated Stemberk by 2,811 votes (40.62%) to 2,752 (39.77%), with activist and former labor union leader August Sallas taking 1,357 (19.61%). Unlike other committeemen and women, García used his office to provide constituent services, which helped him maintain his high-profile. Washington also appointed him deputy commissioner of the Department of Water, a post he held from 1984 to 1986.

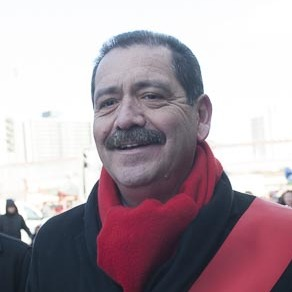
García in 2015

Meanwhile, Washington's allies had sued the city in federal court, claiming that the ward map drawn up after the 1980 Census had unfairly dispersed black and Hispanic voters. At that time, whites were about 40% of the city's population, blacks were also about 40%, and Hispanics were about 15%, but there were 33 white aldermen, only 16 black and just one Hispanic. In December 1985, as a result of a November 1985 ward remap, judge Charles Ronald Norgle Sr. of the United States District Court for the Northern District of Illinois ordered a special election for March 18, 1986, in seven wards, including the 22nd. The special elections gave Washington the opportunity to wrest control of the city council from Vrdolyak. Stemberk chose not to run for re-election and García declared his candidacy. In the nonpartisan election, García faced supermarket owner and Stemberk ally Guadalupe Martinez and beauty supply store owner Fred Yanez. Yanez emphasised his military service and Martinez called García "100 percent Communist" and criticized him for selling garbage cans, which Martinez gave away for free. García won by 3,293 votes (54.58%) to Martinez's 2,013 (33.37%) and Yanez's 727 (12.05%), carrying 26 of the 27 precincts. He was also re-elected committeeman with 53.98% of the vote, carrying 24 of the 27 precincts.

His election and the victory of two other Washington supporters meant that Vrdolyak's supporters had a one-seat majority. Six weeks later, Washington ally Luis Gutiérrez won a runoff in the 26th Ward and the council was thus evenly split between Washington and Vrdolyak supporters. As Washington had the ability to cast tie-breaking votes, Vrdolyak was stripped of his powers and the Council Wars ended. García was re-elected with 3,998 votes (53.59%) in 1987 and with 2,707 votes (52.36%) in 1991. On the council, he served on the Budget and Government Operations; Committees, Rules, Municipal Code Revision and Ethics; Economic Development; Education; Finance; License; Ports, Wharves, and Bridges; Streets and Alleys; Traffic Control and Safety committees and chaired the Aviation committee.

=== Illinois Senate ===
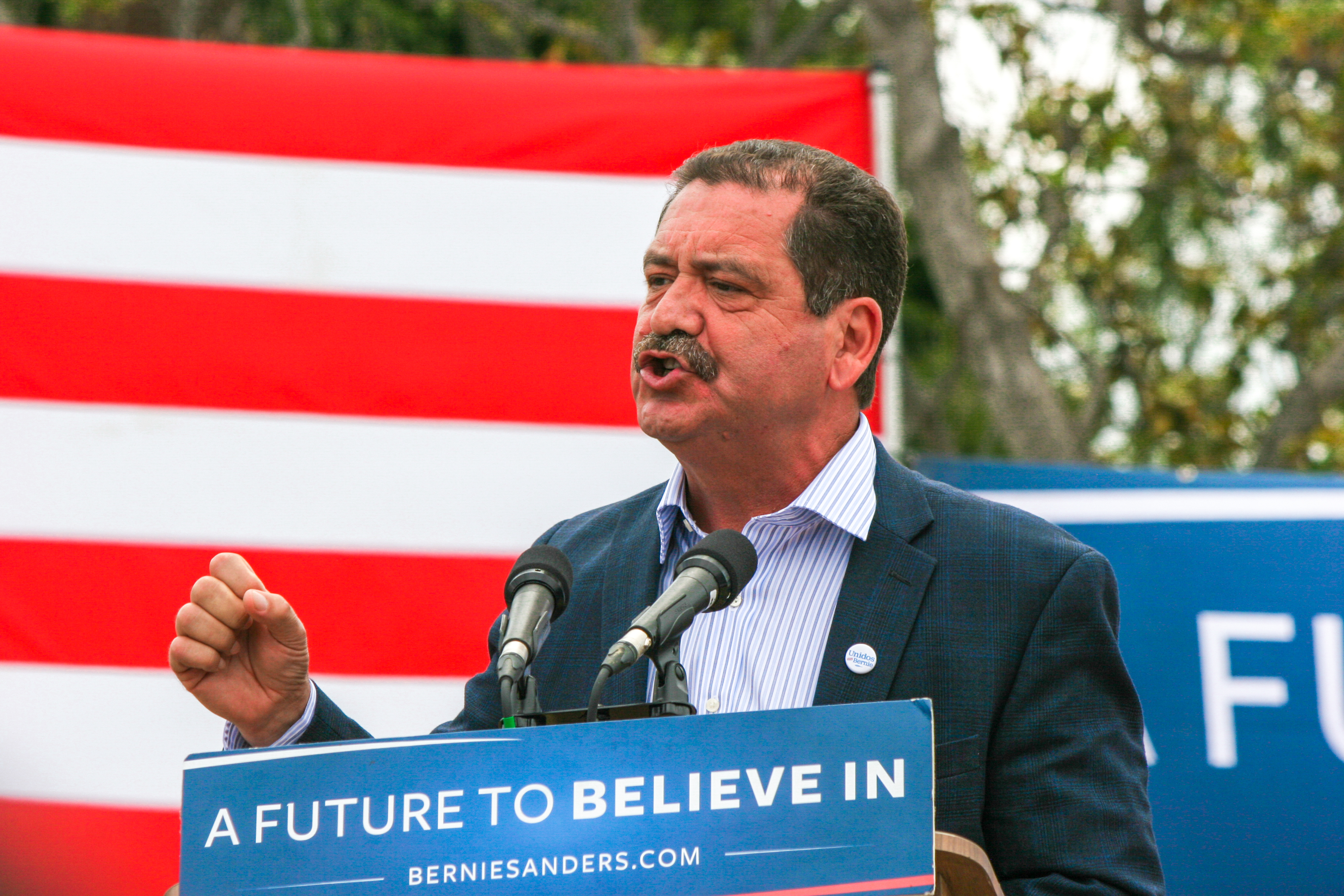
García at a Bernie Sanders rally in Los Angeles, California, May 2016

Democratic state senator Howard W. "Howie" Carroll of the 1st district of the Illinois Senate was redistricted to the 8th district, and in 1992 García ran for the Illinois Senate in the 1st district, winning the open-seat Democratic primary with 8,604 votes (52.06%) to Donald C. Smith's 6,159 (37.26%) and Gilbert G. Jimenez's 1,765 (10.68%). The primary was tantamount to election in the heavily Democratic 1st district, and in the general election, and García defeated Republican nominee Esequiel "Zeke" Iracheta, 21,314 votes (81.74%) to 4,762 (18.26%). He was Illinois's first state senator of Mexican descent. García resigned from the city council and was succeeded by his protégé Ricardo Muñoz.

In the 1996 Democratic primary, García was challenged by Alderman Juan Soliz of the 25th Ward. Soliz, who had also been elected in the March 1986 special elections, had been supported by Vrdolyak, earning him Chicago Hispanics' ire. When Soliz was elected, he called for unity among Hispanic aldermen, a plea they ignored. Soliz and García even celebrated their inaugurations by hiring separate mariachi bands to play outside the council chambers. After Soliz was replaced as chair of the Aviation Committee by García, he derided it as a "racist move", though they were both Mexican-Americans. García defeated Soliz, 6,839 votes (59.34%) to 4,686 (40.66%) and was re-elected unopposed in the general election. In office, García helped shepherd "immigrant-friendly" health care and education reforms through the legislature. He lost the 1998 Democratic primary election to Antonio Munoz, who was backed by the Hispanic Democratic Organization, Mayor Richard M. Daley's campaign group and political machine. Munoz defeated García by 6,924 votes (53.72%) to 5,964 (46.28%). Alderman Ricardo Muñoz (no relation to Antonio Munoz), talking in 2010 about his mentor's defeat, said: "Part of the rationale that I think Chuy lost in '98 was that we got sloppy and they [Munoz and the HDO] got lucky. It rained all day, and we didn't have raincoats for our guys until 11 o'clock. By that time, they were frozen stiff. So we lost the field game."

=== Political interregnum ===
After his defeat, García left office in January 1999, founded and became executive director of the Little Village Community Development Corporation. He helped grow what is now known as Enlace to 27 full-time employees, 120 part-time employees, and an annual budget of $5 million. In June 2005, he helped found the Latino Action Research Network, a PAC to help better represent the city's Latino population.

On Mother's Day 2001, García and members of the group demanded the construction of a high school promised to the community, but unfunded. Fourteen parents and grandparents organized a hunger strike. Chicago Public Schools CEO Paul Vallas initially refused to meet with the hunger strikers, but by the end of the first week, he visited their tent to negotiate terms. The hunger strike lasted 19 days and increased public pressure on the school district to fund the project.

In August 2001, then-newly appointed Chicago Public Schools CEO, Arne Duncan, reallocated funds to begin construction on the school. Community members continued to advocate for participation in designing the new school, and door-to-door parent surveys contributed to the curricular focus of each school on the campus.

=== Cook County Board of Commissioners ===
In 2010, García ran for the Cook County Board of Commissioners, challenging 7th district member and HDO candidate Joseph Mario Moreno in the Democratic primary. García defeated him, 9,602 votes (54.74%) to 7,939 (45.26%). In the general election, he defeated Green Party nominee Paloma M. Andrade, 24,612 votes (86.29%) to 3,912 (13.72%). After the election, Toni Preckwinkle appointed García Floor Leader. He was re-elected unopposed to a second term on the Board of Commissioners in the 2014 elections.

== Chicago mayoral campaigns ==
=== 2015 mayoral campaign ===
García entered the mayoral race against incumbent mayor Rahm Emanuel after being recruited by Chicago Teachers Union President Karen Lewis, a leading progressive candidate who had fallen ill and was forced to call off her own campaign. García won 34% of the vote in the February 24 primary, and Emanuel failed to win more than 50%, forcing a runoff election on April 7. The campaign received national attention, and some considered it a preview of the 2016 Democratic presidential primary. Senator Bernie Sanders endorsed García in what he called a "political revolution in Chicago." García opposed the Ashland Bus Rapid Transit plan, the Belmont flyover, and red light cameras. Emanuel won the runoff election with 55% of the vote.

=== 2019 mayoral election ===
After incumbent and formal rival Rahm Emanuel announced that he would not seek a third term in 2019, many people speculated that a high-ranking Latino politician would enter the race. Gutiérrez and García were seen as potential candidates. After Gutiérrez declined to run, he expressed his intent to draft García into the race. Sanders expressed his desire for García to "take a look for running for mayor." García ultimately did not run.

In the 2019 mayoral runoff election, García endorsed Lori Lightfoot, delivering a blow to the already faltering campaign of Lightfoot's opponent, Toni Preckwinkle. Preckwinkle, who had been García's ally on the Cook County Board of Commissioners, had declined to endorse him for mayor in 2015. Lightfoot defeated Preckwinkle in a landslide.

=== 2023 mayoral campaign ===
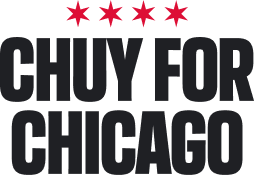
García's 2023 mayoral campaign logo

García (right) speaking during mayoral forum at University of Illinois Chicago, sitting beside opponents Paul Vallas and Lori Lightfoot

Early in 2022, García had been seen as a potential candidate to challenge Mayor Lori Lightfoot in the 2023 election. He had previously said that Lightfoot was "fac[ing] the toughest reelection challenge of any mayor in 40 years".

Before entering the race, García expressed interest in it because of Lightfoot's unpopularity and a poll that showed him leading Lightfoot 43% to 34%. On November 10, 2022, García announced his second campaign for mayor of Chicago in a press conference at Navy Pier. The date of his announcement was the 40th anniversary of García's mentor and ally Harold Washington's announcement of his 1983 mayoral candidacy. García's announcement came only two days after the 2022 U.S. House of Representatives election in which he was re-elected. Lightfoot criticized García for "abandoning Congress" when the Democratic Party was losing its majority in the House.

García was late to enter the mayoral race, the last of Lightfoot's eight challengers to announce his campaign. By the time he announced his candidacy, a number of groups that had supported his 2015 campaign, such as the Chicago Teachers Union and United Working Families, had pledged their support to Brandon Johnson's candidacy. In the months before García launched his campaign, such groups had grown impatient with his lack of a campaign announcement. García asked United Working Families to postpone making a mayoral endorsement, but due to his refusal to give them a date by which he planned to announce whether he would run, they endorsed Johnson in September 2022.

García was endorsed by former Illinois Governor Pat Quinn, former Chicago mayor and Harold Washington's vice mayor David Orr, former U.S. representative Luis Gutiérrez, U.S. representatives Jan Schakowsky and Mike Quigley, Aldermen Andre Vasquez, Michael Rodriguez, and Felix Cardona Jr., Illinois state representatives Theresa Mah and Robyn Gabel, activist Dolores Huerta, United Farm Workers, and International Union of Operating Engineers Local 150.

García was the only Latino candidate in the election. Along with Paul Vallas, who is white, García was one of only two candidates on the ballot who was not black.

García faced controversy over political donations he received from Sam Bankman-Fried and stories that allege links to illicit activities by Michael Madigan involving Commonwealth Edison. Lightfoot seized on this and ran ads against him focusing on these controversies.

As Vallas began to rise in the polls, Garcia joined Lightfoot in attacking Vallas as aligned with the Republican Party. This included accusing Vallas of being inadequately pro-choice, despite Vallas's record of claiming to be pro-choice and endorsements from Planned Parenthood and Personal PAC during his 2002 gubernatorial and 2014 lieutenant gubernatorial campaigns. Both García and Lightfoot pointed to a 2009 interview in which Vallas declared himself to be "more of a Republican than a Democrat because, fundamentally, I oppose abortion" and said that "if I were to run for office again, I would run as a Republican". But Vallas also described himself in that interview as "personally pro-choice". Another line of attack García and Lightfoot used against Vallas was criticism of his relationship with and endorsement by Chicago's police union. García cast Vallas's closeness to the FOP as indicating that there would be "no police accountability" under a Vallas mayoralty. García also derided the police union as "far right".

García also traded barbs with Brandon Johnson. Johnson said García had "abandon[ed] the progressive movement" and was no different from Lightfoot in his proposals for combating violent crime. He also said García had been absent from work on a number of issues that impacted Latino neighborhoods in the city. García characterized Johnson's tax proposals as incomplete and outside of a mayor's ability to enact. He questioned whether Johnson, a former organizer for the Chicago Teachers Union, would be able to objectively negotiate with them on behalf of the city.

Despite having once been a formidable front-runner in the election, García was defeated in the first round of the election. He placed fourth out of nine candidates, receiving 77,222 votes (13.68% of the vote). Vallas and Johnson placed first and second, respectively, and advanced to the runoff.

García placed first in only six of the city's 50 wards. All six were wards represented by Latino aldermen. In five of them, the runner-up was Vallas. One factor in García's weak performance was that turnout in Latino-majority wards of the city, voter turnout lagged behind the rest of the city. Turnout in Hispanic wards had also been low in the 2019 Chicago mayoral election. Additionally, García failed to place first in four Northwest-side Latino-majority wards in areas of the city that had given him strong support in his previous mayoral campaign, with Johnson placing first in two of those wards and Vallas placing first in the other two. García also lagged behind Johnson in other areas of the city that had supported him in 2015. On March 17, García endorsed Johnson's candidacy in the runoff election.

== U.S. House of Representatives (2019–present) ==
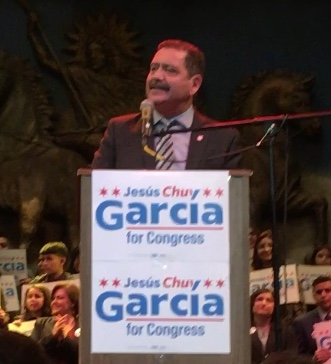
García at a congressional campaign rally in South Lawndale, Chicago, February 2018

While in congress, García has become an important power broker in Illinois politics. He was an ally of then-Illinois House Speaker Michael Madigan. García first aligned himself with Madigan years earlier, when he supported Madigan's contested 2016 reelection. In July 2022, a staffer of his published a now deleted tweet on his government account calling a critic "borderline retarded" and a "fucking dipshit".

=== Elections ===
==== 2018 ====
On November 27, 2017, six days before the deadline to file petitions to run in the 2018 election, Congressman Luis Gutiérrez pulled his petition, effectively choosing to retire at the conclusion of his 13th term. The next day, García signaled his intention to run for the open seat. During Gutiérrez's press conference, he endorsed García as his successor. Bernie Sanders also endorsed García. Politico called Gutiérrez's sudden retirement "totally abnormal" and his endorsement of García a "coronation", as the district is so heavily Democratic that the primary is the real contest and the general election is effectively a formality.

García won the Democratic nomination in March 2018 with 60% of the primary vote. He defeated financial adviser Mark Wayne Lorch in the November 6 general election with 86% of the vote.

==== 2020 ====
García ran for reelection in 2020 and was unopposed in the primary. Christopher Lasky was the only Republican to file before the filing deadline. Lasky died on December 23, 2019, but remained the only candidate on the primary ballot and won posthumously. After the primary, party leaders chose local political activist Jesus Solorio as the new Republican nominee. García won the general election with nearly 85% of the vote.

==== 2022 ====
García was re-elected to a third term, defeating Republican nominee James Falakos and Working Class Party nominee Edward Hershey.

==== 2024 ====
García was re-elected to a fourth term, defeating Republican nominee Lupe Castillo and Working Class Party nominee Edward Hershey.

==== 2026 ====
In November 2025, García announced that he would not run for reelection in 2026. He made the decision hours before the filing deadline with García's chief of staff Patty García, being the only one who filed to run for the Democratic primary. The move was described as a "machine politics" move with García's decision to retire on the eve of the filing deadline paving the way for a "handpicked" successor. The move to retire on the filing deadline was largely criticized by local and national political figures. On November 14, García was interviewed by the Chicago Sun-Times, where he mentioned his health and personal reasons as a factor in his decision to retire, while also acknowledging the criticism he had received. U.S. representative Marie Gluesenkamp Perez from Washington criticized García on the House floor and called for a congressional resolution in disapproving of García’s actions. On November 18, 2025, the House of Representatives passed Gluesenkamp Perez's resolution in a vote of 236-183. U.S. senator Andy Kim and political strategist David Axelrod supported Gluesenkamp Perez's remarks and criticized García's decision as "undemocratic" and a different form of "election denial". Still, García received notable support from colleagues. House Democratic Leader Hakeem Jeffries urged members to oppose the rebuke, calling García “a progressive champion” and “a good man” who was the “voice of the voiceless.” Rep. Alexandria Ocasio-Cortez also criticized the effort to punish him, warning that it set a dangerous precedent.

=== Tenure ===
==== Immigration ====
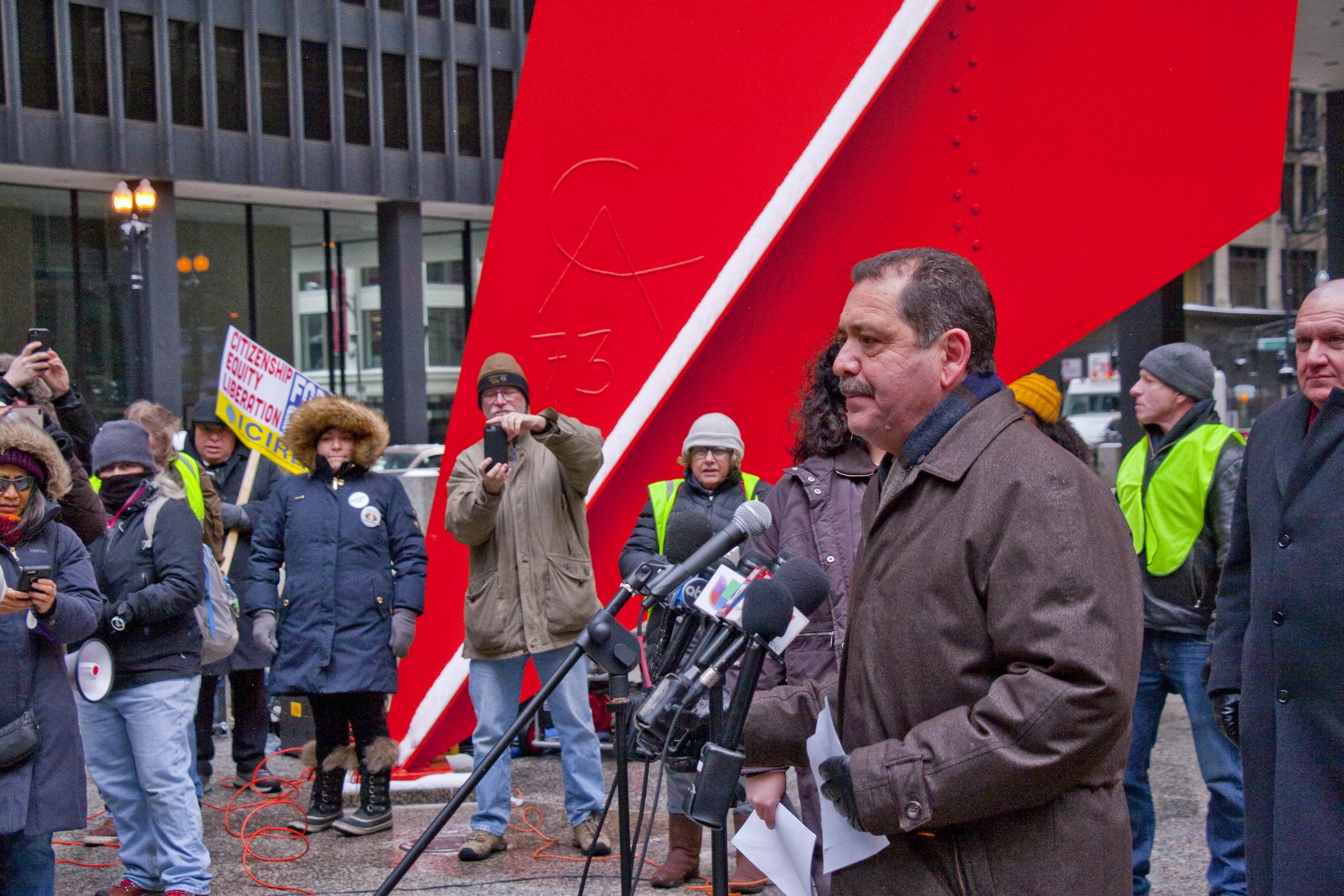
Garcia speaks against Trump's border emergency declaration, 2019

During a congressional hearing in July 2019, García asked former Immigration and Customs Enforcement acting director Thomas Homan of the Trump administration family separation policy: "how [he] can possibly allow this to happen under [his] watch, [does he] not care? Is it because these children do not look like children that are around [him]?" Right-wing commentators widely condemned García's questions; Homan called them "disgusting".

On December 10, 2019, García introduced the New Way Forward Act, an immigration reform bill.

==== Foreign policy ====
In July 2019, García voted against a House resolution condemning the Global Boycott, Divestment, and Sanctions Movement targeting Israel. The resolution passed 398–17.

In 2021, García was one of eight Democrats to vote against the funding of Israel's Iron Dome missile defense system.

In 2023, Garcia was among 56 Democrats to vote in favor of H.Con.Res. 21, which directed President Joe Biden to remove U.S. troops from Syria within 180 days.

==== 2023 debt-ceiling crisis ====
García was among the 46 Democrats who voted against final passage of the Fiscal Responsibility Act of 2023 in the House during the 2023 United States debt-ceiling crisis.

=== Committee assignments ===
For the 119th Congress:

- Committee on the Judiciary
  - Subcommittee on the Administrative State, Regulatory Reform, and Antitrust
  - Subcommittee on Immigration Integrity, Security, and Enforcement
- Committee on Transportation and Infrastructure
  - Subcommittee on Aviation
  - Subcommittee on Highways and Transit
  - Subcommittee on Railroads, Pipelines, and Hazardous Materials

=== Caucus memberships ===
- Congressional Hispanic Caucus
- Congressional LGBT Equality Caucus
- Congressional Progressive Caucus

== Political positions ==
=== Presidential politics ===
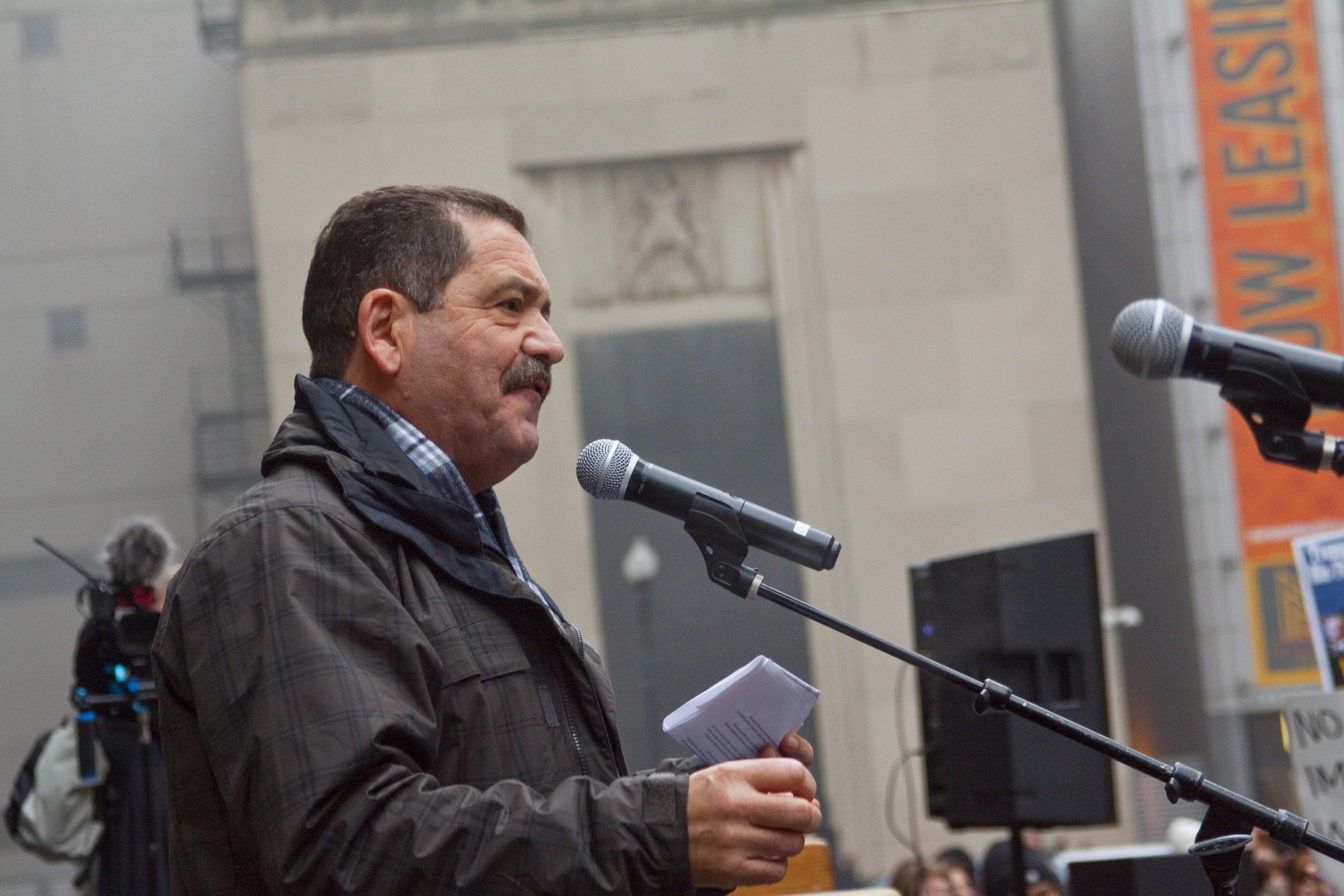
García in 2017 at a protest against Donald Trump

García endorsed Bernie Sanders for President of the United States in the 2016 election and the 2020 election. In the 2016 presidential election, García was a presidential elector from Illinois, casting a vote for Democratic nominees Hillary Clinton and Tim Kaine in the electoral college.

On July 19, 2024, García called for Joe Biden to withdraw from the 2024 United States presidential election.

== Electoral history ==
=== Illinois State Senate ===
Illinois 1st State Senate District General Election, 1992
Party	Candidate	Votes	%
Democratic	Jesús G. Garcia	21,314	81.74
Republican	Esequiel Zeke Iracheta	4,762	18.26
Total votes		26,076	100.0

Illinois 1st State Senate District General Election, 1996
Party	Candidate	Votes	%
Democratic	Jesús G. Garcia (incumbent)	21,539	100.0
Total votes		21,539	100.0

Illinois 1st State Senate District Democratic Primary, 1998
Party	Candidate	Votes	%
Democratic	Antonio "Tony" Munoz	6,924	53.72
Democratic	Jesús G. Garcia (incumbent)	5,964	46.28
Total votes		12,888	100.0

=== Cook County Board of Commissioners ===
Cook County Board 7th District Commissioner Democratic Primary, 2010
Party	Candidate	Votes	%
Democratic	Jesús G. "Chuy" García	9,602	54.74
Democratic	Joseph Mario Moreno (incumbent)	7,939	45.26
Total votes		17,541	100.0

Cook County Board 7th District Commissioner General Election, 2010
Party	Candidate	Votes	%
Democratic	Jesús G. "Chuy" García	24,612	86.29
Green	Paloma M. Andrade	3,912	13.72
Total votes		28,524	100.0

Cook County Board 7th District Commissioner General Election, 2014
Party	Candidate	Votes	%
Democratic	Jesús G. "Chuy" García (incumbent)	25,320	100.0
Total votes		25,320	100.0

=== U.S. House of Representatives ===
Illinois 4th Congressional District Democratic Primary, 2018
Party	Candidate	Votes	%
Democratic	Chuy García	49,631	66.22
Democratic	Sol A. Flores	16,398	21.88
Democratic	Richard Gonzalez	8,921	11.90
Total votes		74,950	100.0

Illinois 4th Congressional District General Election, 2018
Party	Candidate	Votes	%
Democratic	Chuy García	143,895	86.59
Republican	Mark Wayne Lorch	22,294	13.41
Total votes		166,189	100.0

Illinois's 4th congressional district, 2020
Party	Candidate	Votes	%	±%
Democratic	Chuy García (incumbent)	187,219	84.05	−2.54%
Republican	Jesus E. Solorio Jr.	35,518	15.95	+2.54%
Total votes		222,737	100.0	
Democratic hold				

Illinois's 4th congressional district, 2022
Party	Candidate	Votes	%
Democratic	Chuy García (incumbent)	91,036	68.42
Republican	James Falakos	37,352	28.07
Working Class	Edward Hershey	4,605	3.46
Write-in		54	0.041
Total votes		133,047	100.0
Democratic hold			

Illinois 4th Congressional District Democratic Primary, 2024
Party	Candidate	Votes	%
Democratic	Chuy García (incumbent)	30,433	69.62
Democratic	Raymond A. Lopez	13,286	30.38
Total votes		43,729	100.0

Illinois's 4th congressional district election, 2024
Party	Candidate	Votes	%
Democratic	Chuy García (incumbent)	139,343	67.5
Republican	Lupe Castillo	56,323	27.3
Working Class	Ed Hershey	10,704	5.2
Write-in		26	0.0
Total votes		206,396	100.0
Democratic hold			

=== Mayor of Chicago ===
2015 Chicago mayoral election
Candidate	General election		Runoff election	
Candidate	Votes	%	Votes	%
Rahm Emanuel (incumbent)	218,217	45.63	332,171	56.23
Jesus "Chuy" García	160,414	33.5	258,562	43.77
Willie Wilson	50,960	10.66		
Robert W. "Bob" Fioretti	35,363	7.39		
William "Dock" Walls, III	13,250	2.77		
Write-ins	52	0.01		
Total	478,256	100	590,733	100

2023 Chicago mayoral election
Candidate	General election		Runoff election	
Candidate	Votes	%	Votes	%
Brandon Johnson	122,093	21.63	319,481	52.16
Paul Vallas	185,743	32.90	293,033	47.84
Lori Lightfoot (incumbent)	94,890	16.81		
Chuy García	77,222	13.68		
Willie Wilson	51,567	9.13		
Ja'Mal Green	12,257	2.17		
Kam Buckner	11,092	1.96		
Sophia King	7,191	1.27		
Roderick Sawyer	2,440	0.43		
Write-ins	29	0.00		
Total	564,524	100.00	612,514	100.00

== See also ==
- List of Hispanic and Latino Americans in the United States Congress
- Mexicans in Chicago

U.S. House of Representatives
Preceded by Luis Gutiérrez	Member of the U.S. House of Representatives from Illinois's 4th congressional district 2019–present	Incumbent
U.S. order of precedence (ceremonial)
Preceded by Russ Fulcher	United States representatives by seniority 201st	Succeeded by Sylvia Garcia
