= New Way Forward =

New Way Forward may refer to:

- New Way Forward Act, United States immigration reform legislation introduced in 2019
- The New Way Forward, a working title for the Iraq War troop surge of 2007

== See also ==
- Way Forward (disambiguation)
