= Way Forward =

Way Forward may refer to:

- Conservative Way Forward, a British campaigning group within the Conservative Party
- The Way Forward, Ford Motor Company's restructuring plan made public in 2006
- WayForward, an American video game development company

== See also ==
- New Way Forward (disambiguation)
