= Joseph Mario Moreno =

American politician

Member of the Cook County Board of Commissioners from the 7th district
- In office December 1994 – December 2010
- Preceded by: district established
- Succeeded by: Chuy García

Personal details
- Political party: Democratic

Joseph Mario Moreno was Commissioner for the 7th district of Cook County, Illinois from 1994 until 2010.

== Early life ==
Moreno earned his law degree from DePaul University College of Law.

== Public service ==
Prior to his election as a commissioner, Moreno worked for the Chicago Attorney General's Office as Special Assistant to the Attorney General. He also served on the Committee on Financing for the Secretary of State's Office. Moreno ran for Mayor of Cicero in the 2001 and 2003 municipal election.

== Cook County Commissioner ==
Moreno was the chairperson for the Building Committee and vice-chair for the Labor, Tax and Revenue, and Roads and Bridges Committees. Additionally, Moreno served on 13 committees: Real Estate, Tax Delinquency, Stroger and Cermak Hospitals, Information and Automation, Environmental Control, Construction, Contract Compliance, Industrial Claims, Rules, Law Enforcement and Corrections, Health and Hospitals, Finance, and Zoning and Buildings.

Commissioners Joseph Mario Moreno, along with Roberto Maldonado, both Chicago Democrats, wanted to expand Cook County vehicle sticker tax to all vehicles in municipalities, including Chicago, where the vehicle-sticker fee recently was raised for sport-utility vehicles. All Cook County residents would have to buy a $40 vehicle sticker for each car they own under a proposal two County Board commissioners are floating to help plug a budget deficit now pegged at $238 million. He also went on record against cutting the county budget, and was in favor of raising the sales tax by 1.25% or more.

As Cook County Board Commissioner, Moreno voted multiple times to uphold a historic 2008 Cook County sales tax increase, remaining the highest in the nation. As a result, the Chicago Tribune encouraged voters to vote against him in the 2010 elections. Moreno lost his bid for re-nomination in the February 2, 2010 primary. He lost the nomination to former State Senator Jesús "Chuy" García by more than 1,600 votes. (55% to 45%)

In 2010, Moreno proposed a bill to limit and restrict the use of Twitter from federal and government meetings. The bill was defeated by the Rules & Administrative committee 5–1.

Moreno was arrested on June 28, 2012, on corruption charges. On September 2, 2014, he was sentenced to 11 years in prison.
