= Jeffery Jump =

Bus route in Chicago, Illinois

J14
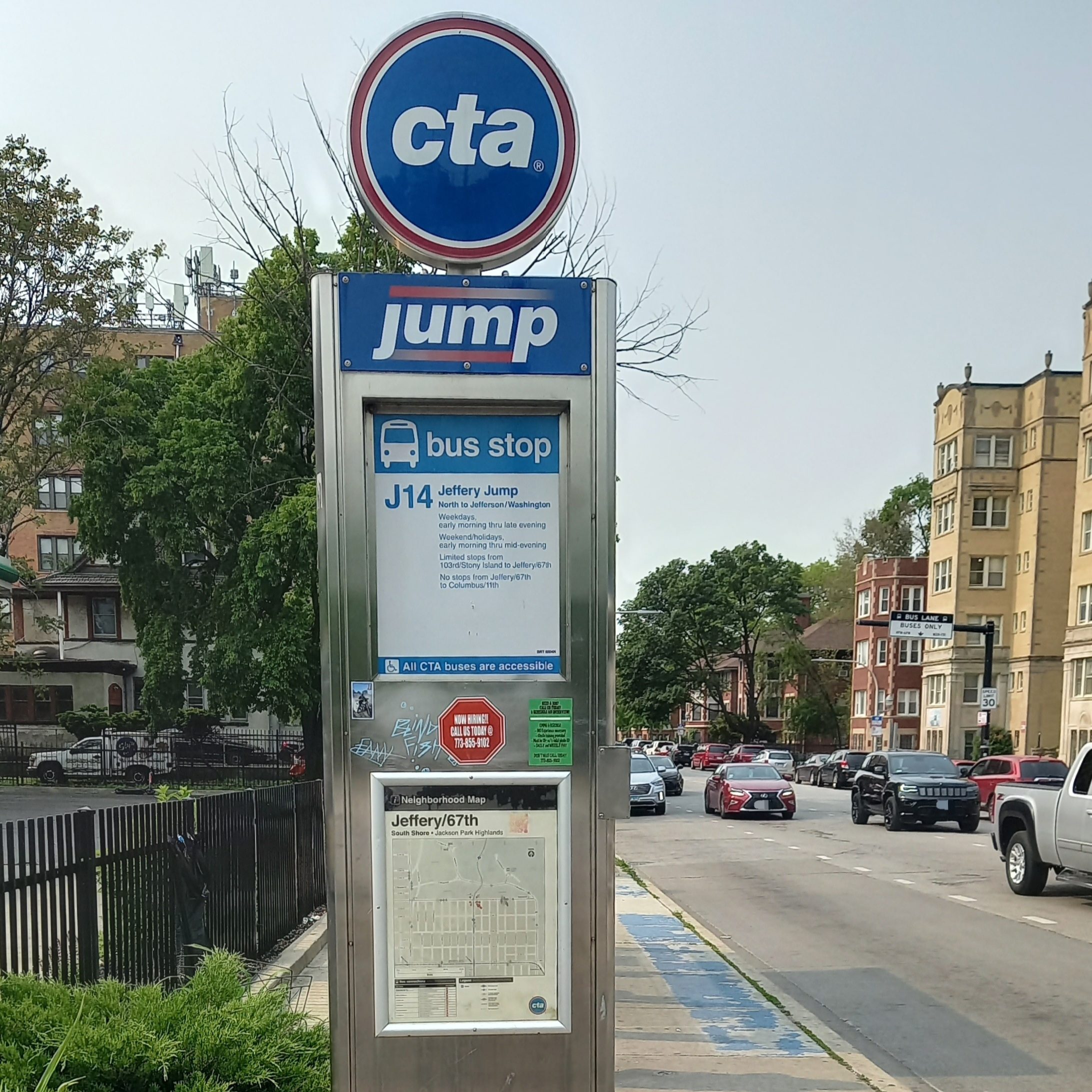
- Jeffery Jump bus stop at 67th Street

Overview
- System: CTA bus system
- Operator: Chicago Transit Authority
- Began service: J14: November 12, 2012; 13 years ago
- Predecessors: 14 Jeffery Express

Route
- Route type: Express bus service, partly bus rapid transit
- Locale: Chicago
- Start: Washington/Jefferson
- End: 103rd/Stony Island
- Other routes: 15 Jeffery Local

Service
- Frequency: 10 minutes
- Timetable: Link

The J14 Jeffery Jump (formerly 14 Jeffery Express) is an express bus service in Chicago. It is the first Chicago Transit Authority (CTA) bus route to incorporate some features of bus rapid transit, such as transit signal priority and bus lanes. Transit signal priority takes place from 71st Street to 83rd Street. The bus lanes along Jeffery Boulevard are only available from 67th Street to 83rd Street/South Chicago Avenue during rush hour. The route mostly runs concurrently with 15 Jeffery Local south of 67th Street.

== History ==
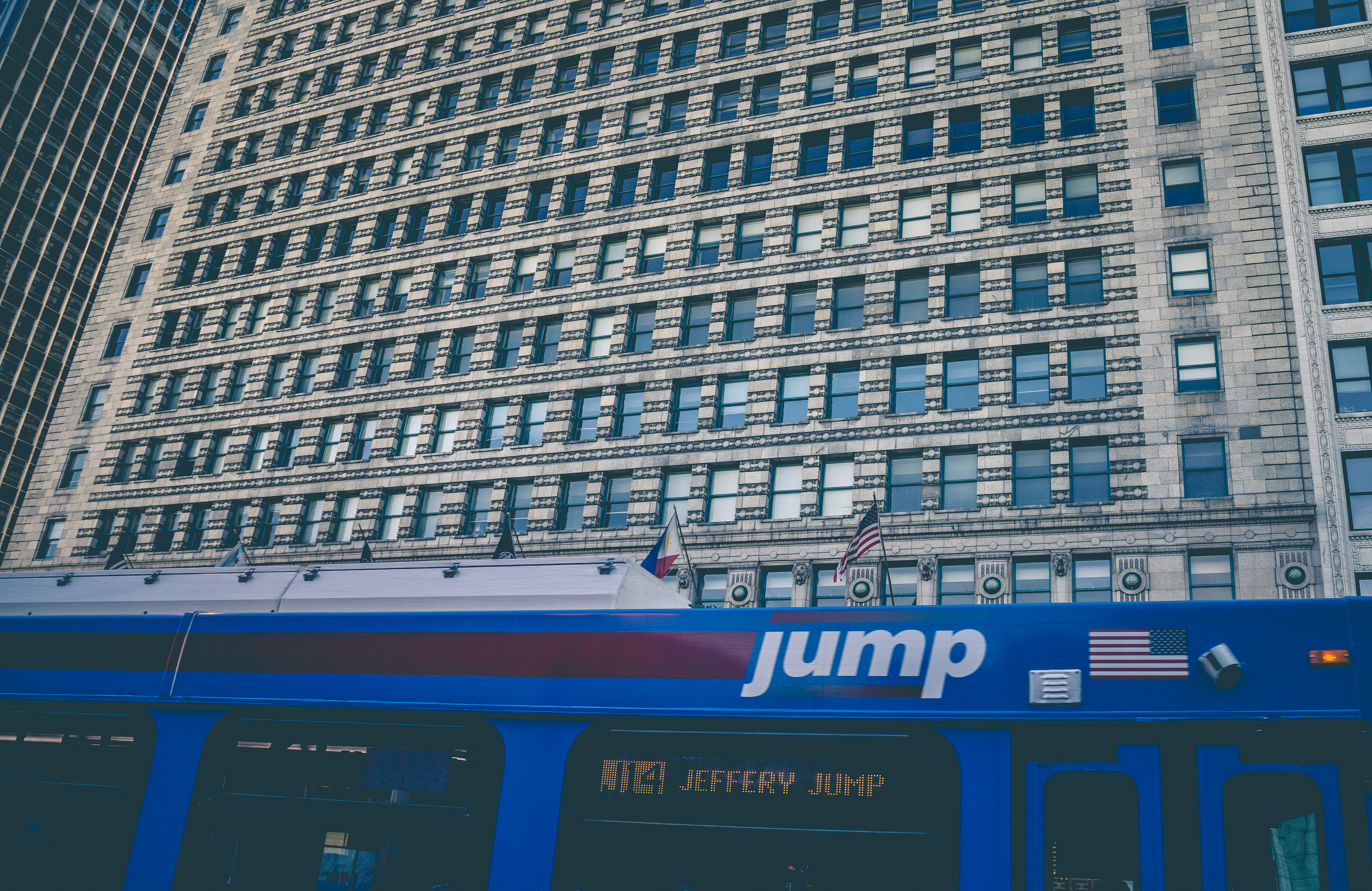
Bus livery on some J14 buses have a blue color scheme and the "jump" logo.

J14 Jeffery Jump was previously 14 Jeffery Express without bus rapid transit features.

The bus rapid transit (BRT) project along Jeffery Boulevard was planned as part of a larger proposal to add multiple BRT routes along certain bus corridors, which was advocated by the Metropolitan Planning Council.

In 2010, the CTA was awarded $11 million in federal grant to build a bus rapid transit route along Jeffery Boulevard. The route was planned to have bus lanes available only during rush hour periods, transit signal priority, and a queue jump lane at 83rd Street/South Chicago Avenue.

On September 18, 2012, a few months before operation began, the new route was branded as "Jeffery Jump" with a unique light blue color scheme associated with the route.

The Jeffery Jump began service on November 12, 2012; in 2013, transit signal priority between 71st Street and 83rd Street went into effect.

Since March 3, 2025, the Jeffery Jump is one of the first select services to receive a headway of at most 10 minutes under the Frequent Network program.

== Service ==
The bus route runs from 103rd/Stony Island (103rd Street Garage) in South Deering to Washington/Jefferson in the Near West Side, with the majority of the bus route traveling along Jeffery Boulevard, Lake Shore Drive, and the Loop Link bus lanes; buses do not stop on Lake Shore Drive. The route mostly runs concurrently with 15 Jeffery Local south of 67th Street.

=== Stations ===
Stations (SB)	Stations (NB)	Connections and notes
Washington/Jefferson		
Canal	Clinton	Metra: (at Ogilvie TC), (at Union Station)
Washington/Franklin	Madison/Franklin	
Washington/LaSalle	Madison/LaSalle	Chicago "L": Brown Orange Pink Purple (at Washington/Wells)
Washington/Clark–Dearborn	—N/a	Chicago "L": Blue (at Washington)
—N/a	Madison/Dearborn–State	Chicago "L": Blue (at Monroe and Washington), Red (at Monroe)
Washington/State	—N/a	Chicago "L": Red (at Lake), Brown Green Orange Pink Purple (at Washington/Wabash)
—N/a	Madison/Wabash	Chicago "L": Brown Green Orange Pink Purple (at Washington/Wabash)
Monroe		
Jackson		
Van Buren	—N/a	Metra/NICTD: (at Van Buren Street)
—N/a	Ida B. Wells	
Harrison	—N/a	
Michigan		
Columbus		
11th		Metra/NICTD: (at Museum Campus/11th Street)
Non-stop service via Lake Shore Drive
67th		
71st		Metra: (at Bryn Mawr)
75th		
77th		
79th		
81st		
83rd/South Chicago		
87th		
89th		
91st		
93rd		
95th		
97th		
99th/Van Vlissingen		
Paxton		
Yates		
Hoxie	Torrence	
Bensley		
Luella		
103rd/Stony Island		

== See also ==
- Ashland Bus Rapid Transit, a proposed busway project along Ashland Avenue.
- Loop Link, a second busway project completed in 2015; the J14 travels along the busway.
- Pace Pulse, a suburban bus rapid transit system operated by Pace
