= Loop Link =

Busway project in Chicago, Illinois

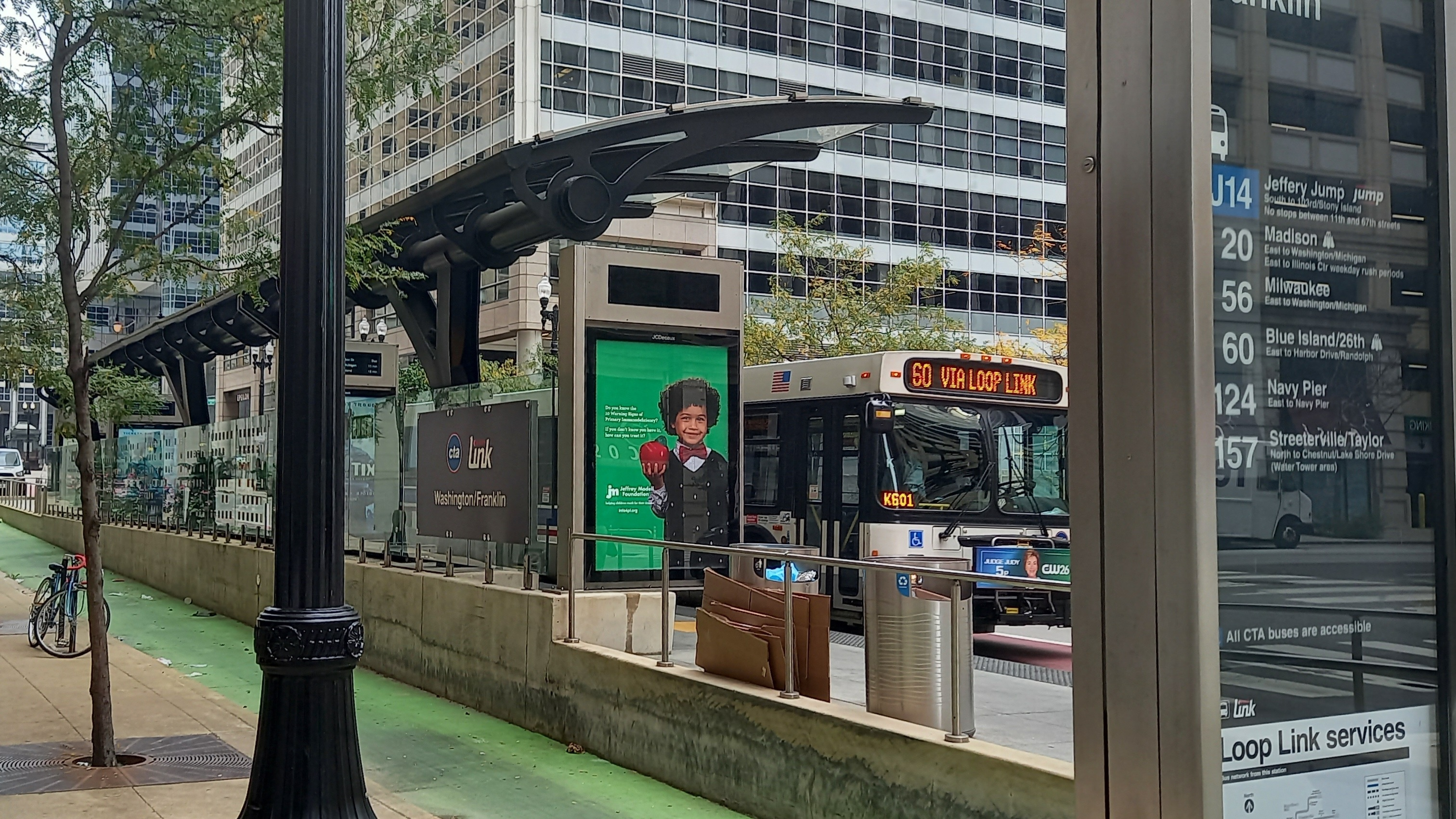
- Loop Link busway and a bus station at Washington Boulevard and Franklin Street
- Location: Chicago, Illinois, U.S.
- Proposer: Chicago Transit Authority
- Project website: www.transitchicago.com/looplink
- Status: Complete
- Type: Bus service improvement
- Start date: March 16, 2015; 11 years ago
- Completion date: December 21, 2015; 10 years ago

The Loop Link, also called the Central Loop BRT during planning, is a completed busway project in the Chicago Loop and the Near West Side, serving multiple Chicago Transit Authority bus routes that run along Canal Street, Washington Street, Madison Street, and Clinton Street.

== History ==
=== Background ===
Throughout the mid-20th century, aside from the already-opened State Street and Milwaukee–Dearborn subways, city planners had proposed a third downtown subway lines that would run east–west.

In the 1958 New Horizons project, two east–west lines were proposed: a subway line under Jackson Boulevard and an underground busway under Washington Street.

In 1968, a newer plan, the Chicago Urban Transportation District, called for an east–west downtown subway line, running from the University of Illinois Chicago campus to Grant Park primarily along Monroe Street. In addition, another subway line would parallel the lakefront from McCormick Place to the Streeterville neighborhood. Ultimately, by the late 1970s, growing project cost and insufficient funding led to the planned subway system and the project as a whole being canceled.

In 1989, the Chicago Central Area Circulator light rail project was proposed. The system would serve as far south as McCormick Place, as far west as Clinton Street (Chicago Union Station and Chicago and North Western Terminal), as far north as Streeterville, and as far east as Navy Pier. While the project gained support, it also gained opposition from certain businesses, citing disruption from the project. As a result, certain segments were realigned, leading to delays. The project was eventually canceled in 1995 due to state and federal funding being pulled.

=== Busway project ===
In the mid to late 2000s, a bus improvement project was proposed with its project limit spanning from Union Station to Navy Pier; part of the project included the addition of busways. The project received a $24.6 million grant from the Federal Transit Administration in July 2010 as well as an additional $7.3 million from the city's tax increment financing in February 2012.

In February 2013, the Chicago Department of Transportation (CDOT) and the Chicago Transit Authority (CTA) announced the addition of dedicated bus lanes as well as protected bike lanes. The agencies also announced a bus transportation center adjacent to Union Station.

The busway was originally scheduled to become operational in 2014; however, construction was delayed to 2015 and the project scope was reduced to just the east–west busways. Construction began on March 16, 2015; earlier that month, the Central Loop BRT was rebranded as Loop Link. The busway system opened on December 21, 2015.

== See also ==
- Ashland Bus Rapid Transit
- Jeffery Jump
- Pace Pulse
