= Antonio Munoz (American politician) =

American politician

Member of the Illinois Senate from the 1st district
- In office January 9, 1999 – October 21, 2022
- Preceded by: Chuy García
- Succeeded by: Javier Cervantes

Personal details
- Born: February 18, 1964 (age 62) Chicago, Illinois, U.S.
- Party: Democratic
- Spouse: Patricia Muñoz

Antonio Muñoz (born February 18, 1964) is a former Democratic member of the Illinois Senate, who represented the 1st District. The 1st district included all or parts of Garfield Ridge, Archer Heights, West Elsdon, Brighton Park, Gage Park, Chicago Lawn, New City, McKinley Park, Bridgeport, Armour Square, Lower West Side and Near South Side within Chicago.

== Early life, education and career ==
Munoz graduated from Good Shepherd Grammar School and graduated in 1982 from Quigley South, now Archbishop Quigley Preparatory Seminary. After graduation, he served in the United States Army with 82nd Airborne Division, and later attended the John F. Kennedy School of Government at Harvard University. Munoz began his career with the Chicago Police Department, later moving to Chicago City Hall. In 1990, he began working with Mayor Daley's Liquor License Commission, Local Liquor Control Section. He went on to work in the Department of Aviation, the Mayor's Office of Budget and Management, and the Law Department.

== Illinois Senate ==
Munoz unseated incumbent Democrat member of the Illinois Senate Jesús "Chuy" García in the 1998 election. Munoz was backed by the Hispanic Democratic Organization as well as Mayor Richard M. Daley's campaign. Munoz defeated García by 6,924 votes (53.72%) to 5,964 (46.28%).

Munoz was Chairman of the Transportation Committee; Vice-Chairman of Environment and Energy; and Sub-Chairman on the Subcommittee on Licensed Professionals. Additionally he served on Appropriations III; Licensed Activities; Subcommittee on Tollways; Senate Task Force on Illinois Alcoholic Beverage Laws; and the Revenue Special Issues Subcommittee. He is also co-founder and treasurer of the Latino Caucus.

Munoz helped pass a bill to grant Illinois’ children of illegal immigrants access to instate tuition levels so that they can continue their education at the state's public colleges and universities. This bill would allow students who have attended school in Illinois for at least three years and graduated from a high school in Illinois to pay in-state tuition regardless of their immigration status.

In 2006, Munoz co-sponsored a bill to expand the ability of local police agencies to use money generated by fines stemming from convictions for driving under the influence. This bill allows for a much wider use of DUI funds by law enforcement in combating alcohol-related crimes, like training and setting up check points. Before this law, the funds could only be used for purchasing equipment.

In 2018, JB Pritzker appointed Munoz to the gubernatorial transition's Restorative Justice and Safe Communities Committee.

== Personal life ==
Munoz lives in McKinley Park with his wife Patricia and their three children, Dolores, Michelle, and Tony, Jr. He serves on the Board of Directors of several community organizations including the Easter Seals, Union League Boys and Girls Club, Little Village Boys and Girls Club, and the Valentine Boys and Girls Club. He is also a member of the Harvard Club of Chicago and the Fraternal Order of Police.
