= Patty García =

American politician

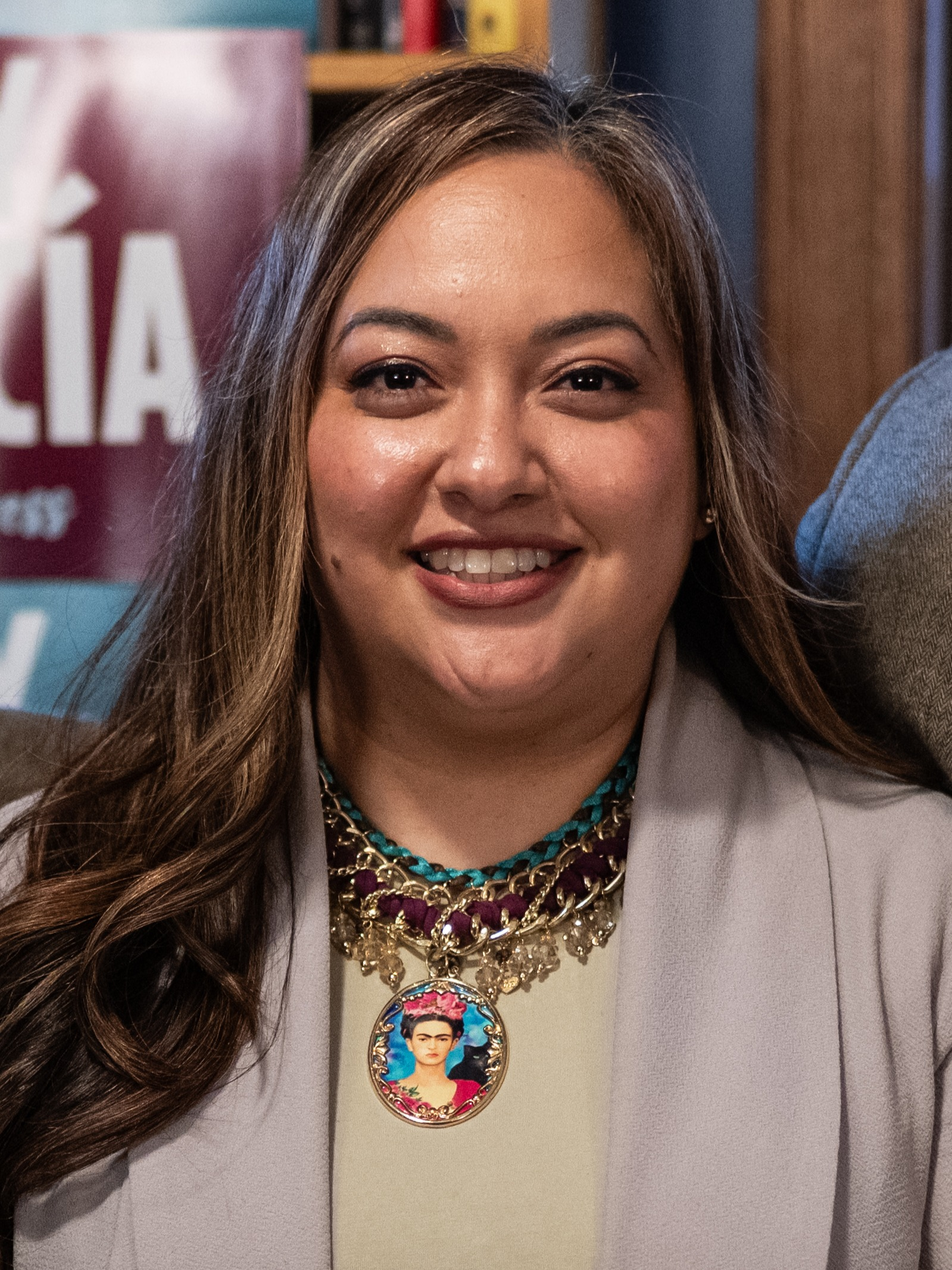
- García in 2023

Member-elect of the U.S. House of Representatives from Illinois's 4th district
- Assuming office January 3, 2027
- Succeeding: Chuy García

Personal details
- Born: 1984 or 1985 (age 40–41) Chicago, Illinois, U.S.
- Party: Democratic
- Education: University of Illinois, Urbana-Champaign (BA, MA, PhD)

Edelmira Patricia García (born 1984/1985) is an American political aide and political candidate who has served as the Chief of Staff for U.S. Representative Chuy García since 2023. She is the member-elect succeeding him after winning the 2026 United States House of Representatives elections in Illinois's 4th congressional district, though she has come under fire for a perceived undemocratic process by which she earned the nomination.

== Early life ==
Edelmira Patricia "Patty" García was born in 1984 or 1985. Garcia earned a PhD in Educational Policy Studies with a Concentration in Latino/a Studies from the University of Illinois Urbana-Champaign in 2011. She is a member of Lambda Theta Alpha.

== Career ==
She went on to serve as Deputy Director of Constituency Services for the National Association of Latino Elected and Appointed Officials Education Fund, where she trained Latino policymakers, and as Vice President of Programs and Operations for the Latino Center for Leadership Development.

She joined Congressman Chuy García's office as District Director in 2019, and then became his Chief of Staff in 2023 while simultaneously serving as District Director.

In 2025, Congressman Garcia chose not to seek re-election for the 2026 cycle, but did not announce this until after the deadline to file and collect signatures for the seat. Patty Garcia became the only person to collect successful signatures, due to her having been made aware on October 31, before the November 3rd deadline. This decision was widely called out as undemocratic and resulted in Rep. Garcia being formally reprimanded. It also resulted in three independent Democrats all seeking the seat: Chicago alder Byron Sigcho-Lopez, Mayra Macias, and Chris Getty, mayor of Lyons, Illinois.

She was announced as the Representative-elect on November 3.

U.S. House of Representatives
Preceded by Chuy García	Member of the U.S. House of Representatives from Illinois's 4th congressional district Taking office 2027	Elect
