= Cook County Board of Commissioners 7th district =

- District
- District 7th
- Current Board of Commissioners map, 7th district highlighted in red
- Country: United States
- State: Illinois
- County: Cook
- Municipalities: list: Chicago

Government
  - Type: District
  - Body: Cook County Board of Commissioners
  - Commissioner: Alma E. Anaya (D)

Cook County Board of Commissioners 7th district is a single-member electoral district for the Cook County Board of Commissioners. It is currently represented by Alma E. Anaya, a Democrat.

== History ==
The district was established in 1994, when the board transitioned from holding elections in individual districts, as opposed to the previous practice of having two multi-member districts: one for ten seats from the city of Chicago and another for seven seats from suburban Cook County at-large.

== Geography ==
=== 1994 boundaries ===
When the district was first established, the district represented parts of the southwest side of Chicago, as well as the cities of Cicero and Stickney, Illinois.

=== 2001 redistricting ===
New boundaries were adopted in August 2001, with redistricting taking place following the 2000 United States census. The district included part of the southwest side of Chicago, as well as part of the city of Cicero.

In regards to townships and equivalent jurisdictions, the district's redistricted boundaries included portions of the city of Chicago and portions of the Cicero Township.

=== 2012 redistricting ===
The district as redistricted in 2012, following the 2010 United States census, was located entirely within the city boundaries of Chicago. It was primarily located on the city's southwest side. Chicago neighborhoods which the district represented include Back of the Yards, Chinatown, Bridgeport, Brighton Park, Heart of Chicago, Little Village, Lower West Side, McKinley Park, Pilsen, West Lawn.

The district was 18.13 square miles (11,600 acres).

=== 2022 redistricting ===
The district as redistricted in 2022, following the 2020 United States census, is entirely located within the city boundaries of Chicago, covering portions of the city's West Side and South Side.

== Politics ==
The district has only ever been represented by Democratic commissioners. The district has been strong Democratic in its Cook County Board of Commissioner elections.

== Demographics ==
The district's population is, and has always been, heavily Hispanic.

== List of commissioners representing the district ==
Commissioner	Party	Years	Electoral history
Joseph Mario Moreno	Democratic	December 1994–December 2010	Elected in 1994, 1998, 2002, 2006; lost reelection in 2010
Jesús "Chuy" García	Democratic	December 2010–December 2018	Elected in 2010 and 2014
Alma E. Anaya	Democratic	December 2018–present	Elected in 2018 and 2022

== Election results ==
Cook County Board of Commissioners 7th district general elections
Year	Winning candidate	Party	Vote (pct)	Opponent	Party	Vote (pct)
1994	Joseph Mario Moreno	Democratic				
1998	Joseph Mario Moreno	Democratic	25,587 (84.27%)	Alberto Alva	Republican	4,962 (15.73%)
2002	Joseph Mario Moreno	Democratic	26,491 (83.13%)	Juan Moreno	Republican	5,377 (16.87%)
2006	Joseph Mario Moreno	Democratic	29,779 (100%)			
2010	Jesus G. Garcia	Democratic	24,820 (86.26%)	Juan Moreno	Green	3,952 (13.74%)
2014	Jesus G. Garcia	Democratic	25,320 (100%)			
2018	Alma E. Anaya	Democratic	41,759 (100%)			
2022	Alma E. Anaya	Democratic	29,480 (100%)			
