= Ashland Bus Rapid Transit =

Planned service by the Chicago Transit Authority

Ashland BRT

Overview
- System: Chicago Transit Authority (CTA)
- Status: Proposed

Route
- Route type: Transitway
- Locale: Chicago
- Start: Irving Park Road
- End: 95th Street
- Length: 16 mi
- Stations: 35

The Ashland Bus Rapid Transit is one of the planned bus rapid transit corridors in Chicago. The service will run on Ashland Avenue from Irving Park Road to 95th Street, a distance of approximately 17 miles.

The route would serve various destinations including the Illinois Medical District, the University of Illinois Chicago, Malcolm X College, and the United Center. It would also provide a connection to seven Chicago Transit Authority subway/elevated rail stations.

Buses would operate using an exclusive lane in the center of the street, with bus platforms located in the median. The service would also utilize features such as transit signal priority and pre-paid fares. CTA estimates that bus speeds on the Ashland BRT would be up to 83% faster than the existing local route.

== History ==
Planning and public engagement were conducted throughout 2012 and 2013. The project's Environmental Assessment was released in November 2013, finding no significant impacts.

The project has generated some opposition due to concerns about impacts on automobile traffic and left-turn restrictions. The CTA responded by agreeing to consider restoring some of the left turns. Despite these concessions, opponents were still not impressed, citing reduced car lanes and the project's "high price tag". The project as a whole was eventually stalled due to oppositions from motorists, especially from the Fulton Market Association.

The project would advance in three phases, with the first phase running 5.5 miles from Cortland Street to 31st Street.

== See also ==
- Jeffery Jump
- Loop Link
