= New Way Forward Act =

US immigration reform legislation

Legislative history
- Introduced in the Senate as H.R. 5383 by Jesús "Chuy" García (D–IL) on December 10, 2019

The New Way Forward Act (H.R. 5383) is a proposed legislation introduced in the U.S. Senate and House on December 10, 2019 by Chuy García. It proposes a broad restructuring of federal immigration enforcement law by reducing reliance on detention and criminal enforcement, narrowing deportation triggers tied to criminal conduct, and shifting more decision-making authority to immigration courts.

The bill would repeal 8 U.S.C. §§ 1325 and 1326, decriminalizing unauthorized border crossings and reentry while keeping immigration violations as civil matters handled through deportation proceedings. It would expand immigration judges’ discretion to grant relief, including in cases involving individuals with criminal records. It also changes detention policy by eliminating mandatory detention in most cases, creating a presumption of release, and phasing out the use of private immigration detention facilities.

The bill would eliminate low-level drug offenses as grounds for deportation and require that qualifying criminal convictions carry a prison sentence of at least five years to serve as the basis for a removal order. It would also authorize immigration judges to decline to issue a deportation order on humanitarian grounds, including in cases involving immigrants with criminal convictions.

The bill was reintroduced in the 117th Congress in 2021 (H.R. 536).

== Background ==
The bill's supporters have introduced a bill roughly divided into seven parts.

- The bill aims to close private prisons or private detention centers for immigrants beginning three years after the bill's possible enactment.
- The Department of Homeland Security officials including Immigrations and Customs Enforcement (ICE) would be prohibited from using national origin, race, ethnicity, or fluency in English when interrogating immigrants.
- Redefines the categories of "serious crimes" which currently bar immigrants from qualifying for asylum. Only felonies with a jail sentence of at least five years would be prohibited from applying for asylum.
- Repeals or limits laws which limits the discretion immigration judges', instead allowing the immigration judge an exercise of discretion suitable in pursuit of humanitarian purposes, assuring family unity, or when it is in the public interest.
- There would be a prohibition on the involvement of state/local law enforcement involvement in the apprehension, investigation, transport, or detention of undocumented immigrants.
- Illegal border crossing would be enforced under civil rather than criminal law procedures.

== Reception ==
=== Support ===
The bill had 45 cosponsors in the 117th Congress, including Alexandria Ocasio-Cortez, Karen Bass, Ilhan Omar, and Pramila Jayapal.

- Raúl Grijalva (AZ-03)
- Nanette Barragán (CA-44)
- Karen Bass (CA-37)
- Tony Cárdenas (CA-29)
- Judy Chu (CA-27)
- Lou Correa (CA-46)
- Mark DeSaulnier (CA-11)
- Jimmy Gomez (CA-34)
- Barbara Lee (CA-13)
- Ted Lieu (CA-33)
- Alan Lowenthal (CA-47)
- Grace Napolitano (CA-32)
- Mark Takano (CA-41)
- Juan Vargas (CA-51)
- Eleanor Holmes Norton (DC-AL)
- Hank Johnson (GA-04)
- Nikema Williams (GA-05)
- Michael San Nicolas (GU-AL)
- Danny K. Davis (IL-07)
- Marie Newman (IL-03)
- Mike Quigley (IL-05)
- Bobby Rush (IL-01)
- Jan Schakowsky (IL-09)
- Jim McGovern (MA-02)
- Ayanna Pressley (MA-07)
- Rashida Tlaib (MI-13)
- Betty McCollum (MN-04)
- Ilhan Omar (MN-05)
- Cori Bush (MO-01)
- Bonnie Watson Coleman (NJ-12)
- Jamaal Bowman (NY-16)
- Yvette Clarke (NY-09)
- Adriano Espaillat (NY-13)
- Mondaire Jones (NY-17)
- Gregory Meeks (NY-05)
- Grace Meng (NY-06)
- Alexandria Ocasio-Cortez (NY-14)
- Ritchie Torres (NY-15)
- Nydia Velázquez (NY-07)
- Earl Blumenauer (OR-03)
- Veronica Escobar (TX-16)
- Sylvia Garcia (TX-29)
- Sheila Jackson Lee (TX-18)
- Pramila Jayapal (WA-07)
- Mark Pocan (WI-02)

The bill has also received support from over 145 advocacy organizations and community representatives.

=== Opposition ===
The bill has received strong opposition from the Republican Party on claims that it would increase crime and weaken the country. The bill would remove low-level drug crimes as deportable offenses and would require that certain criminal convictions come with a prison sentence of at least five years.
